= 2016 Northern Pride RLFC season =

Coordinates: 16°55′49″S 145°46′2″E

Northern Pride
Club information
- Full name: Northern Pride Rugby League Football Club
- Nickname: The Pride
- Colours: Black, teal and gold
- Founded: 2007
- Website: northernpride.com.au

Current details
- Ground: Barlow Park, Cairns (seating 1,700, standing 15,000)
- CEO: Rod Jensen (2015–2016)
- Coach: Joe O'Callaghan (2015–2016)
- Captain: Ryan Ghietti (2016–2018)
- Competition: Intrust Super Cup
- 2016: 8th
Home colours

Away colours

Records
- Premierships: 2 (2010, 2014)
- Runners-up: 1 (2009)
- Minor premierships: 3 (2013, 2014, 2024)

2016 was the ninth competitive season for the Sea Swift Northern Pride Rugby League Football Club based in Cairns, Queensland, Australia. They were one of 14 clubs that played in the twenty-first season of Queensland's top rugby league competition, QRL's Intrust Super Cup, with each team playing 12 home games and 11 away games over 25 weeks between March and August.

Five experienced players retired at the end of the 2015 season: Alex Starmer, Semi Tadulala and Sam Obst along with co-captains Brett Anderson and Jason Roos retired, and Hezron Murgha retired from the Cowboys and signed with the Blackhawks. Between them they had played almost 700 QCup games. The new squad for 2016 was much younger, with an average age of 21, the youngest squad the Pride ever had. The new captain was Ryan Ghietti, who had represented Italy at the 2013 Rugby League World Cup, had played 96 QCup games, and had joined the Pride from Redcliffe Dolphins in 2011. Jack Svendsen was vice-captain, with Luke George filling the role during pre-season trials. A new senior leadership group was selected with the captain and vice-captains joined by Justin Castellaro and Tom Hancock.

At the start of the season there was talk of offering a contract to Shaun Nona, the Tully player who made 25 appearances for the Pride in 2014 before heading to the Melbourne Storm. Nona eventually signed with Mackay Cutters, but then reneged and went to the Intrust Super Premiership NSW Illawarra Cutters, who were coached by former Pride coach Jason Demetriou.

Bob Fowler stood down as Chairman, a position he had held since 2009. He was replaced by interim chairman Terry Mackenroth, who had been Deputy Premier of Queensland and a former director of Queensland Rugby League and the Australian Rugby League. Mackenroth restructured the club's corporate governance and changed the Pride from an incorporated association to a company limited by guarantee, which was one of the requirements of the NRL's elite pathways.

One of the changes suggested was to rename the Northern Pride. The introduction of the Townsville Blackhawks into the competition last year led some Board members to suggest the Pride should be rebranded to reflect the Cairns and Far North Queensland region. The idea was soon shouted down by players and fans.

In order to try and boost crowd numbers, home games were moved from Saturday evenings, to 3:00pm Sunday afternoons, in what the CEO thought was a more family friendly time slot.

In an effort the generate income (the Pride being one of only five QCup teams that are not supported by gambling revenue from a leagues club), the Pride offered businesses the opportunity to sponsor an individual player's jersey for $6,500. The concept had been introduced in the NRL, but was a first for the Intrust Super Cup.

The QRL reduced the number of interchanges this year, following the NRL, dropping interchanges from ten to eight per game. The Pride suffered from a raft of injuries at the end of last season, and so this year they introduced a 'High Performance Unit' made up of doctors, physios, dieticians and coaches who worked with the players to curb injuries and ensure player peaked at the right times. The club introduced GPS tracking for players to monitor workloads.

The Pride took one of their home games, Round 11 against Burleigh Bears up onto the Atherton Tablelands to Atherton Showground, and Country Week, Round 20 against Redcliffe Dolphins was played at Ravenshoe.

Although the Pride had some good wins, 48-0 against Tweed Heads in Round 6, and beat five of the top seven sides, consistency and defence were troublesome for the young side. The Pride won just 11 of their 23 matches and finished in eighth place, their worst season to date. For the first time they lost more home games than they won, and for the second time in their history they missed out on playing in the finals.

At the end of the season, coach Joe O'Callaghan resigned to take up an assistant coaching position at Wynnum-Manly. The players became increasingly unhappy with their options for next year, with some claiming they were offered reduced deals. Several players signed to other clubs. After the final round of the season, the board sacked CEO Rod Jensen. Former Pride player, Chey Bird, was appointed interim CEO.

== 2016 Season - Sea Swift Northern Pride ==
- Competition: Intrust Super Cup
- Sponsor: Sea Swift

=== Staff ===
==== Coaches/Trainers ====
- Coach: Joe O'Callaghan.
- Assistant coach (defence): Shane O'Flanagan
- Assistant coach (attack): Leon Hallie
- Mal Meninga Cup U-18s coaches: Benjamin Fielding, Robbie O'Kane, Bevan Walker
- Cyril Connell Cup U-16s coach:
- Head trainer (Positional/CDRL Allocation Players): Darren Ferricks
- Head first aid officer: Deb Gallop
- Medical (Away crew): Max Conroy
- Welfare officer: Michael White
- Mascot: Barlow the Lion (Peter Spooner)

==== High Performance Unit ====
- Club Sports Science Consultant: Dr Stephen Bird
- High Performance Manager: Matt Di Salvo
- Strength and conditioning Coach: Scott Sudale
- Assistant Strength and Conditioning Coach: Peter Nash
- Rehab Coordinator: Megan Harding
- Physiotherapist: Tim Lowcock
- Sports Dietician: Mitchell Smith
- Mental Edge Coach: Robert Gronbeck

==== Captains ====
- Ryan Ghietti
- Tom Hancock (Trial Match)
- Vice-captain: Luke George
- Vice-captain: Jack Svendsen
- Senior leadership group: Ryan Ghietti, Luke George, Justin Castellaro, Jack Svendsen, Tom Hancock.

=== Managers ===
- Administration Manager: Kerri Neil
- Team manager: Alan Marsh
- Assistant manager (Home): Kev Anderson
- Assistant manager (Away): Murray Stalley
- Chief executive: Rod Jensen.
- Chairman: Terry Mackenroth.
- Board of Directors: Tony Williamson (sponsorship), Colin Moore (CDRL chairman), Ian Lydiard (CDJRL president), Troy McGuane, (Cairns Post sales manager), Gail Andrejic (finance), Stephen Tillett, Rob White (football), Eleanor Scott (government).

== Squad ==
The Pride used just 27 players this season. Fourteen players from last year signed with the club again, and three of the Cowboys allocation players from last year were assigned to the Pride again this year. Ten new players made their debut this season; eight were new signings (Akeripa Tia-Kilifi, Ben Reuter, Brayden Torpy, Khan Ahwang and Rajan Opetaia-Halls, with Colin Wilkie, Fred Koraba and Greg Miglio signed to the Club via the Pride's CDRL Portability Program), and two were new Cowboys allocation players (Coen Hess* and Shaun Hudson*).

Ryan Ghietti (c) – HK
Jack Svendsen (vc) – PR
Aidan Day
Akeripa Tia-Kilife – WG, CE
Ben Reuter – SR
Brayden Torpy – HB
Colin Wilkie – SR
David Murphy – PR
Denzel King – HB
Frederick Koraba
Greg Miglio – CE

Jared Allen – FE
Jordan Biondi-Odo – FE
Justin Castellaro – CE
Keelan White
Khan Ahwang – FB, CE
Linc Port – FB, CE
Luke George (vc) – WG
Rajan Opetaia-Halls – WG, CE
Sheldon Powe-Hobbs – LK, SR
Tom Hancock – SR
Vaipuna Tia Kilifi – SR

North Queensland Cowboys allocation

Ben Spina* – PR, LK
Coen Hess* – PR
Javid Bowen* – CE
Patrick Kaufusi* – PR
Shaun Hudson* – CE

Allocated but did not play for the Pride in 2016:
Antonio Winterstein
Lachlan Coote
Scott Bolton

=== 2016 player gains ===
Player	From League	From Club
Brayden Torpy	NRL Under-20s	Gold Coast Titans
Akeripa Tia Kilifi	NRL Under-20s	North Queensland Cowboys
Rajan Opetaia-Halls	Intrust Super Cup	Central Queensland Capras
Khan Ahwang	Intrust Super Cup	Burleigh Bears
Ben Reuter	CDRL	Innisfail Leprechauns.
Colin Wilkie	CDRL	Innisfail Leprechauns
Frederick Koraba	CDRL	Innisfail Leprechauns
Greg Miglio	CDRL	Tully Tigers

=== Pride Portability Program ===
Player	League	Club
Ned Blackman	CDRL	Atherton Rooster
Ben Schell	CDRL	Brothers Cairns
Luke La Rosa	CDRL	Brothers Cairns
Broski Emery-Hunia	CDRL	Brothers Cairns
Daniel Tatipata	CDRL	Edmonton Storm
Jared Verney	CDRL	Ivanhoe Knights
Sam Pau	CDRL	Kangaroos
Patrick Lewis	CDRL	Kangaroos
Ian King	CDRL	Mareeba Gladiators
Shaun Bowen	CDRL	Mossman-Port Douglas Sharks
Jack Brock	CDRL	Southern Suburbs
Aidan Day	CDRL	Southern Suburbs
Menmuny Murgha	CDRL	Yarrabah Seahawks

=== Player losses after 2015 season ===
Player	To League	To Club
Graham Clark	NRL Telstra Premiership	Canterbury Bulldogs
Codey Kennedy	Intrust Super Cup	Tweed Heads Seagulls
Regan Verney	Intrust Super Cup	Mackay Cutters
Brett Anderson	retired.	
Jason Roos	retired.	
Alex Starmer	retired.	
Semi Tadulala	retired.	
Sam Obst	retired.	
Maddie Oosen	released.	
Dean McGilvray	released.	
Jared Verney	uncontracted.	
PJ Webb	released (personal reasons).	
Nathan Wales	released (to go traveling).	
Travis Peeters	released (work commitments).	
Bradley Stephen	released (work commitments).	
Brent Oosen	released (work commitments).	

==== Cowboys no longer allocated to the Pride ====
Player	To League	To Club
Cameron King*	NRL Telstra Premiership	Parramatta Eels
Hezron Murgha*	Intrust Super Cup	Townsville Blackhawks
Lachlan Coote*		North Queensland Cowboys
Matthew Wright*		North Queensland Cowboys

=== 2016 season launch ===
- Cairns Induction Day: 31 October 2015.
- Pre-season training: 2 November 2015.
- Pre-season boot camp: 23-24 January 2016, Etty Bay Surf Life Saving Club and Callendar Park, Innisfail.
- 2016 Corporate Launch:
- 2016 ISC Season Launch: Friday, 4 March 2016 at the Treasury Casino's Hotel Courtyard, Brisbane, hosted by Channel 9 commentators Scott Sattler and Peter Psaltis, guests heard from QRL Managing Director Robert Moore, Chairman Peter Betros and Intrust Super CEO Brendan O'Farrell.

==== 2016 player awards ====
28 August 2016, Brothers World of Entertainment, Manunda

- Sea Swift Northern Pride Player of the Year: David Murphy
- Sea Swift Players' Player: Sheldon Powe-Hobbs
- Sea Swift Members' Player of the year: Sheldon Powe-Hobbs
- Sea Swift Most improved player: Jared Allen
- Sea Swift Best Back: Justin Castellaro
- Sea Swift Best Forward: Tom Hancock
- John O'Brien Perpetual Club Person of the Year: Gordon Greaves (photographer)

==== 2016 player records ====
- Most Games: Khan Ahwang (23), Ryan Ghietti (23), Linc Port (23).
- Most Tries: Khan Ahwang (13)
- Most Points: Khan Ahwang (206)

==== 2016 representative players ====
(Italy) Ryan Ghietti
(Italy) Jordan Biondi-Odo
(Italy) Justin Castellaro
(Italy) Colin Wilkie

Played for Italy Azzurri in the 2017 Rugby League World Cup qualification

==== 2016 Queensland Residents team ====
Linc Port
Jack Svendsen
David Murphy

==== Northern Pride Life Memberships ====
The first life memberships were awarded at a pre-game luncheon, Round 22, 7 August 2016, Barlow Park.

- John O'Brien AM
- John Moore
- Bob Fowler

==== Sponsors ====
- Naming rights sponsor: Sea Swift
- Jersey sponsor: Sea Swift, Castlemaine XXXX, Emu Sportswear.
- Sponsorship of individual players available from $6,500
- Sleeve sponsor: Rivers Insurance Brokers & LJ Hooker
- Shorts sponsor: Cairns Regional Council, Intrust Super
- Playing strip manufacturer: EMU Sportswear
- Other sponsors: Brothers World of Entertainment; Calanna Pharmacy; BDO; James Cook University; CDRL; hm Health Management; Queensland Country Credit Union; Phoenix Dynamic Sports Entertainment; Cairns Colonial Club Resort; First Response; ASN; Cairns Sports Performance Clinic; Kennards Hire; Proarch Podiatry; Brilliant Technologies; Cairns Total Physio; Queensland Country Health Fund; Pacific Toyota; Ransom Specialty Coffee Roasters; Cairns Hardware; Visual Imaging; Devenish Law.
- Media partners: Sea FM; WIN Television; Cairns Post.

=== Jerseys ===
2016 primary Jersey

2016 alternative Jersey

=== Trial matches ===
Round	Opponent	Score	Date	Venue
Trial 1	Townsville Blackhawks	10 – 22	Saturday, 6 February 2016	Jack Manski Oval, Townsville
Trial 2	CDRL Indigenous All Stars	42 – 22	Friday, 12 February 2016	Stan Williams Park, Cairns
Edmonton Super 9s	CDRL Edmonton Storm	43 – 7	Weekend 13-14 February 2016	Barlow Park, Cairns
Trial 3	NYC NQ Cowboys U-20s	20 – 18	Saturday 20 February 2016	Vico Oval, Cairns

Pre-season Trial 1
Saturday
6 February 2016
19:00 AEST (UTC+10)

Townsville Blackhawks	22 – 10	Northern Pride
Tries: Niemoeller 2 Minoga 1 Parker-Walshe 1 Goals: Parker-Walshe 3 (3 from 4)	Half-time: 12 – 10	Tries: 1 Greg Miglio; 1 Luke George Goals: 1 Khan Ahwang (1 from 2)

Jack Manski Oval
(Golf Links Drive, Kirwan, QLD)
Player of the Match: Tom Hancock

Sea Swift Northern Pride: 1. Khan Ahwang – FB 2. Menmuny Murgha – WG 3. Justin Castellaro – CE 4. Greg Miglio – CE 5. Luke George – WG 6. Jared Allen – FE 7. Brayden Torpy – HB 8. Jack Svendsen – PR 9. Ryan Ghietti (c) – HK 10. David Murphy – PR 11. Vaipuna Tia-Kilifi – SR 12. Lachlan Parmenter – SR 13. Tom Hancock – LK
Unlimited Interchange: 14. Denzel King, 15. Ben Reuter, 16. Ben Schell, 17. Akeripa Tia-Kilifi, 18. Rajan Opetaia-Halls, 19. Keelan White, 20. Fred Koraba.
Unavailable: Jordan Biondi-Odo (ankle), Menmuny Murgha (fractured jaw), Akeripa Tia Kilifi (ankle), Sheldon Powe-Hobbs & Linc Port (selected to play for the North Queensland Cowboys trial match against the Brisbane Broncos in Bundaberg).
Townsville and District Mendi Blackhawks: 1. Jonathon Reuben, 2. Lenny Magey, 3. Connor Carey, 4. Delouise Hoeter, 5. Samsen O'Neill, 6. Sam Foster, 7. Michael Parker-Walshe, 8. Daniel Beasley, 9. Anthony Mitchell, 10. Corey Jensen, 11. Lorenzo Ma'afu, 12. Noel Underwood, 13. Glenn Hall.
Interchange: 14. Nathan Norford, 15. Andrew Niemoeller, 16. Willie Minoga, 17. Temone Power.
Coach: Kristian Woolf

Pre-season Trial 2
Friday
12 February 2016
19:30 AEST (UTC+10)

Northern Pride	42 – 22	CDRL Indigenous All Stars
Tries: Denzel King 1 Linc Port 1 Luke George 1 Jared Allen 2 Ben Reuter 1 Shawn Bowen 1 Keelan White 1 Goals: Brayden Torpy 5 (5 from 8)		Tries: 1. 2. 3. 4. Goals: 3 from 4

Stan Williams Park
(Manunda, QLD)

Sea Swift Northern Pride: 1. Linc Port – FB 2. Shawn Bowen – WG 3. Greg Miglio – CE 4. Akeripa Tia-Kilifi – CE 5. Luke George – WG 6. Jared Allen – FE 7. Brayden Torpy – HB 8. Ben Schell – PR 9. Denzel King – HK 10. David Murphy – PR 11. Col Wilkie – SR 12. Tom Hancock (c) – SR 13. Ben Reuter – LK
Unlimited Interchange: 14. Keelan White, 15. Lachlan Parmenter, 16. Rajan Opetaia-Halls, 17. Ian King, 18. Corey Child (U-20s), 19. Aiden Lee (U-20s), 20. Jared Burton (U-20s).
Unavailable: Jordan Biondi-Odo (ankle), Justin Castellaro (rib), Menmuny Murgha (fractured jaw), Sheldon Powe-Hobbs (selected to play for the Cowboys.
* = North Queensland Cowboys allocation (No Cowboys players allocated for this match).
CDRL Indigenous All Stars: 1. Septimus Ambrym (Yarrabah Seahawks), 2. Tim Savage (Tully Tigers), 3. Sam Bann (Yarrabah Seahawks), 4. Rikki Sutherland (Southern Suburbs), 5. Cephas Chinfat (Southern Suburbs), 6. James Doolah (Cairns Brothers), 7. Charlie Murgha (Yarrabah Seahawks), 8. Dave Oui (Mossman-Port Douglas Sharks), 9. Eddie Daniel (Mossman-Port Douglas Sharks), 10. Dan Sagigi (Innisfail Leprechauns), 11. Joel Marama (Mossman-Port Douglas Sharks), 12. Brent Oosen (Southern Suburbs), 13. Jordan Ketchell (Tully Tigers).
Interchange: 14. Rob Amber (Mossman-Port Douglas Sharks), 15. Milton Mossman (Yarrabah Seahawks), 16. Kyle Kris (Innisfail Leprechauns), 17. Brayden Grogan (Ivanhoes), 18. Daryl Lightning (Mossman-Port Douglas Sharks), 19. Boshay Satrick (Southern Suburbs), 20. Jubei Doi (Cairns Kangaroos).
Coach: Ty Williams (Innisfail Leprechauns), Assistant coaches: Brenton Bowen and Michael White.

Edmonton Super 9s Carnival

Grand Final
Weekend
13–14 February 2016

Northern Pride	43 – 7	CDRL Edmonton Storm
Tries: Ryan Ghietti 1 Khan Awahng 1 Shawn Bowen 1 Bonus tries: Ryan Ghietti 1 Vaipuna Tia-Kilifi 2 Ned Blackman 1 Drop kick conversion: Khan Ahwang 3 (3 from 3); Fred Korobe 2 (2 from 3); Shawn Bowen 1 (1 from 1)		Tries: Bonus tries: 1 Murgha Drop kick conversions: 1 (1 from 1)

Barlow Park
(Severin Street, Parramatta Park, QLD)

The Edmonton Super 9s Carnival was held over two days.
Day 1:

Home	Score	Away	Saturday 13 February
Northern Pride	15 – 0	Burdekin Roosters	Game 4, 3:30pm
Northern Pride	30 – 5	Edmonton Lightning	Game 7, 4:30pm
Northern Pride	17 – 21	Brothers Cairns	Game 10, 5:30pm
Northern Pride	Pride won	Yarrabah Seahawks	Game 15, 7:10pm

Day 2:

Home	Score	Away	Sunday 14 February
Northern Pride	39 – 0	Edmonton Lightning	Quarter-final, 10:00am
Northern Pride	25 – 4	Brothers Cairns	Semi-final, 12:30pm
Northern Pride	43 – 7	Edmonton Storm	Grand-final, 2:15pm

Sea Swift Northern Pride Super 9s: 2. Khan Ahwang, 3. Shawn Bowen, 6. Jared Allen, 7. Ned Blackman, 8. Jack Svendsen (vc), 9. Ryan Ghietti (c), 10. Rajan Opetaia-Halls, 15. Ben Reuter. 11. Fred Koraba.
Unlimited Interchange: 4. Matthew Musumeci (U-20s), 5. Jack Willis (U-20s), 12. Vaipuna Tia-Kilifi, 13. Jacob Wallace (U-20s), 14. Whyatt Barnes (U-20s), 16. Patrick Lewis.
Coaches: Leon Hallie and Darren Ferricks.
- Note: The winning team received $3,000.

Pre-season Trial 3
Saturday
20 February 2016
16:00 AEST (UTC+10)

Northern Pride	20 – 18	NYC NQ Cowboys U-20s
Tries: Ben Spina* 1 Javid Bowen* 1 Denzel King 1 Sheldon Powe-Hobbs 1 Goals: Khan Ahwang 2 (2 from 4)	Quarter-time: 0 – 6 Half-time: 14 – 6 Three-quarter time: 20 – 12.	Tries: 1 Kalyn Ponga; 1 Coen Hess*; 1 Jake Clifford* Goals: 1 Number 12 (1 from 1); 1 Jake Clifford* (1 from 1)

Vico Oval
(Irene Street, Mooroobool, QLD)

Sea Swift Northern Pride: 1. Linc Port – FB 2. Khan Ahwang – WG 3. Javid Bowen* – CE 4. Shaun Hudson* – CE 5. Luke George – WG 6. Jared Allen – FE 7. Brayden Torpy – HB 8. David Murphy – PR 9. Ryan Ghietti (c) – HK 10. Patrick Kaufusi* – PR 11. Vaipuna Tia-Kilifi – SR 12. Jack Svendsen – SR 13. Ben Spina* – LK
Unlimited Interchange: 14. Denzel King, 15. Sheldon Powe-Hobbs,

16. Tom Hancock, 17. Col Wiilkie, 18. Akeripa Tia-Kilife.

Unavailable: Jordan Biondi-Odo (ankle), Justin Castellaro (rib), Menmuny Murgha (fractured jaw).
Rested: Fred Korabe, Rajan Opetaia-Halls.
* = Cowboys allocation (4 players allocated for this match).
Cowboys NYC U-20s squad: 11. Coen Hess* (c), Cooper Bambling (vc), Brandon Smith (vc), 1. Kalyn Ponga, 19. Jake Clifford, Nick Lui-Toso, Ross Bella, Nick Brown, Jacob Burke, Michael Carroll, Ty Carucci, Reuben Cotter, Mitch Dunn, Rhein Frank, Kaleb Fuimaono, Gideon Gela-Mosby, Cody Grills, Marshall Hudson, Marcus Jensen, Trey Kemp, Jordan Kenworthy, Jack Lote, Cody Maughan, Emry Pere, Jesse Pomare-Anderson, Bacho Salam, Nathan Traill, Enari Tuala, Tahanui Tutavake, Kurt Wiltshire.
Coach: Aaron Payne.

=== Intrust Super Cup matches ===
ROUND 1: Intrust Super Cup 2016 – Zaidee's Rainbow Foundation Round

Sunday
6 March 2016
12:40 AEST (UTC+10)

Sunshine Coast Falcons	25 – 24	Northern Pride
Tries: Ryley Jacks 1 Matt Grieve 2 Curtis Scott* 1 Nelson Asofa-Solomona 1 Goals: Pat Hollis (2 from 5) 2 Field goal: Ryley Jacks 1	Half-time: 10 – 24; Penalties: 5 – 6 QRL Report	Tries: 1 Jared Allen; 1 Linc Port; 1 Shaun Hudson*; 1 Jack Svendsen; Goals: 4 Khan Ahwang (4 from 4)

Sunshine Coast Stadium
(Sportsmans Parade, Bokarina, Kawana Waters, QLD)
Referee: Christopher Butler & Tyson Brough.
Interchange Official: Bruce McGill.
Touch Judges: Alexander Mallory & Andrew Wareham.
Player of the Match: Ben Hampton*.

Sea Swift Northern Pride: 1. Linc Port – FB 2. Khan Ahwang – WG 3. Javid Bowen* – CE 4. Shaun Hudson* – CE 5. Luke George – WG 6. Jared Allen – FE 7. Brayden Torpy – HB 8. David Murphy – PR 9. Ryan Ghietti (c) – HK 10. Patrick Kaufusi* – PR 11. Vaipuna Tia Kilifi – SR 12. Jack Svendsen (vc) – SR 13. Ben Spina* – LK
Interchange: 14. Denzel King, 15. Tom Hancock, 16. Sheldon Powe-Hobbs, 17. Akeripa Tia Kilifi.
* = Cowboys allocation (4 players allocated for this match).
Unavailable: Jordan Biondi-Odo (ankle), Justin Castellaro (rib), Menmuny Murgha (fractured jaw).
Sunshine Coast Falcons: 1. Eddie Tautali, 2. Tony Tumusa*, 3. Curtis Scott*, 4. Matt Grieve, 5. Rowan Klein, 6. Alex Bishop, 7. Ryley Jacks, 15. Tui Kamikamica, 9. Nafe Seluini, 10. Nelson Asofa-Solomona, 11. Pat Hollis, 12. Joe Stimson*, 13. Troy Giess (c). Ben Hampton*
Interchange: 14. Robbie Ward, 16. Callum Klein, 17. Jacob Samoa, 18. Martin Cordwell, 21. Ryan Hansen.
* = Melbourne Storm allocation (3 players allocated for this match).
Coach: Craig Ingebrigtsen.
- Note: This match was broadcast at live on Channel 9 with Matthew Thompson, Scott Sattler and Peter Psaltis as the commentary team.
  This was the Pride debut for Khan Ahwang, Brayden Torpy and Akeripa Tia-Kilifi (Pride Players 121, 123 & 124), and North Queensland Cowboys allocation player Shaun Hudson* (Pride Player 122).

Position	Round 1 – 2016	P	W	D	L	B	For	Against	Diff	Pts
8	Northern Pride	1	0	0	1	0	24	25	-1	0

ROUND 2: Intrust Super Cup 2016

Sunday
13 March 2016
15:00 AEST (UTC+10)

Northern Pride	44 – 24	Mackay Cutters
Tries: Linc Port 3 Javid Bowen* 3 Khan Ahwang 1 Braydon Torpy 1 Goals: Khan Ahwang (6 from 8) 6	Half-time: 28 – 12; Penalties: 11 – 10; QRL Report	Tries: 1 Matthew Wright; 1Josh Chudleigh; 1 Braden Hamlin-Uele; 1 Johnny Faletagoa'i; Goals: 4 Liam Taylor (4 from 4)

Barlow Park
(Severin Street, Parramatta Park, QLD)
Referee: Tim Rutherford
Interchange Official: Pietro Narducci
Touch Judges: Kane Schwartz & Liam Kennedy

Sea Swift Northern Pride: 1. Linc Port – FB 2. Khan Ahwang – WG 3. Javid Bowen* – CE 18. Justin Castellaro – CE 5. Luke George – WG 6. Jared Allen – FE 7. Brayden Torpy – HB 8. David Murphy – PR 9. Ryan Ghietti (c) – HK 10. Patrick Kaufusi* – PR 11. Vaipuna Tia-Kilifi – SR 12. Jack Svendsen (vc) – SR 13. Ben Spina* – LK
Interchange: 14. Denzel King, 15. Tom Hancock, 16. Sheldon Powe-Hobbs, 17. Akeripa Tia-Kilifi.
* = Cowboys allocation (3 players allocated for this match).
Unavailable: Jordan Biondi-Odo (ankle), Menmuny Murgha (fractured jaw).
Pride Out: Shaun Hudson* (centre).
Pride In: Justin Castellaro (centre).
Mackay Cutters: 1. Liam Taylor, 2. Jordan Pereira, 3. Johnny Faletagoa'i, 4. Matthew Wright, 5. Jack Creith, 6. Howard Brown, 7. Delayne Ashby, 8. Brad Lupi, 9. Josh Chudleigh, 10. Braden Hamlin-Uele, 11. Brenden Treston, 12. Patrick Mago*, 13. Steve Rapira.
Interchange: 14. Jacob Pottinger, 15 Joss Boyton, 16. Andrew Davey, 17. Alex Farrell, 18. Ryan Kinlyside.
Coach: David Simpson.
* = Cowboys allocation (4 players allocated for this match).

Position	Round 2 – 2016	P	W	D	L	B	For	Against	Diff	Pts
4	Northern Pride	2	1	0	1	0	68	49	+19	2

ROUND 3: Intrust Super Cup 2016

Saturday
19 March 2016
15:00 AEST (UTC+10)

Norths Devils	28 – 20	Northern Pride
Tries: Michael Lucas 1 Maeli Seve 1 Brett Greinke 1 Trae Clark 1 David Faamita 1 Goals: Todd Murphy (3 from 5) 3 Penalty Goals: Todd Murphy (4 from 6) 4	Half-time: 20 – 6 Penalties: 8 – 5 QRL Report	Tries: 1 Linc Port; 1 Khan Ahwang; 1 Vaipuna Tia-Kalifi; 1 Luke George Goals: 2 Khan Ahwang (2 from 4)

Albert Bishop Park
(Hedley Avenue, Nundah QLD)
Referee: Nicholas Morel.
Interchange Official: Bruce McGill.
Touch Judges: Marcus Schooth & Benjamin Watts.

Sea Swift Northern Pride: 1. Linc Port – FB 2. Khan Ahwang – WG 3. Javid Bowen* – CE 4. Shaun Hudson* – CE 5. Luke George – WG 6. Jared Allen – FE 7. Brayden Torpy – HB 8. David Murphy – PR 9. Ryan Ghietti (c) – HK 10. Patrick Kaufusi* – PR 11. Vaipuna Tia-Kilifi – SR 12. Jack Svendsen (vc) – SR 13. Ben Spina* – LK
Interchange: 14. Denzel King, 15. Tom Hancock, 16. Sheldon Powe-Hobbs, 17. Akeripa Tia-Kilifi.
* = Cowboys allocation (4 players allocated for this match).
Unavailable: Menmuny Murgha (fractured jaw).
Pride Out: Justin Castellaro (centre).
Pride In: Shaun Hudson* (centre).
Norths Devils: 1. Trae Clark, 2. Michael Lucas, 3. David Faamita, 4. Jarryd Dodd, 5. Maeli Seve, 6. Billy Brittain (c), 7. Todd Murphy, 8. Francis Molo, 9. Jayden Berrell, 10. Brett Greinke, 11. Tristan Lumley, 12. Matiu Love-Henry, 13. Jai Arrow.19.
Interchange: 14. William McNee, 15. Rhett Webster, 16. Hemi Mullen, 18. Billy Solah, 19. Rez Phillips, 20. Dylan Smith.
Coach: Mark Gliddon.
- Note: The Queensland Rugby League official site shows the wrong scores for this match, see: QRL Report (Incorrect score).

Position	Round 3 – 2016	P	W	D	L	B	For	Against	Diff	Pts
9	Northern Pride	3	1	0	2	0	88	77	+11	2

ROUND 4: Intrust Super Cup 2016

Round 4
25–28 March 2016, Easter

Northern Pride	BYE

Position	Round 4 – 2016	P	W	D	L	B	For	Against	Diff	Pts
9	Northern Pride	3	1	0	2	1	88	77	+11	4

ROUND 5: Intrust Super Cup 2016

Saturday
2 April 2016
17:00 AEST (UTC+10)

Ipswich Jets	24 – 26	Northern Pride
Tries: Rory Humphreys 1 Carlin Anderson 1 Marmin Barba 1 Sebastian Pandia 1 Dane Phillips 1 Goals: Haydan Lipp (2 from 5) 2	Half-time: 18 – 18; Penalties: 6 – 7 QRL Report	Tries: 1 Ryan Ghietti; 1Jack Svendsen; 1 Khan Ahwang; 1 Colin Wilkie Goals: 4 Khan Ahwang (4 from 4); Penalty Goal: 1 Khan Ahwang

North Ipswich Reserve
(Ipswich, QLD)
Referee: Tim Rutherford.
Interchange Official: Shaun Macdonald.
Touch Judges: Marcus Schooth & Rodney Spain.

Sea Swift Northern Pride: 1. Linc Port – FB 2. Khan Ahwang – WG 3. Shaun Hudson* – CE 4. Justin Castellaro – CE 5. Luke George – WG 6. Jared Allen – FE 7. Brayden Torpy – HB 8. David Murphy – PR 9. Ryan Ghietti (c) – HK 10. Patrick Kaufusi* – PR 11. Vaipuna Tia-Kilifi – SR 12. Jack Svendsen – SR 13. Ben Spina* – LK
Interchange: 14. Denzel King, 15. Tom Hancock, 16. Rajan Opetaia-Halls, 19. Colin Wilkie.
* = Cowboys allocation (3 players allocated for this match).
Unavailable: Javid Bowen* (selected to debut for North Queensland Cowboys against St. George Illawarra Dragons; Menmuny Murgha (fractured jaw); Sheldon Powe-Hobbs.
Pride Out: Javid Bowen* (centre), Sheldon Powe-Hobbs (bench), Akeripa Tia-Kilifi (bench).
Pride In: Justin Castellaro (centre), Rajan Opetaia-Halls (bench), Colin Wilkie (bench).
Ipswich Jets: 1. Carlin Anderson, 2. Marmin Barba, 3. Rory Humphreys, 4. Nemani Valekapa, 5. Richard Pandia, 6. Haydan Lipp, 7. Dane Phillips (c), 8. Joshua Seage, 9. Landon Hayes, 10. Nathaniel Neale, 11. Samuel Martin, 12. David Fa'alogo, 13. Fakahoko Teutau.
Interchange: 14. Sebastian Pandia, 15. Jesse Roberts, 16. Billy McConnachie, 17. Michael Purcell.
Coaches: Ben Walker and Shane Walker.
- Note: This was Ryan Ghietti's 100th Intrust Super Cup game for the Pride. Ghieti became the eighth Pride player to reach 100 games after Jason Roos (165 games), Brett Anderson (128), Ben Spina* (122), Alex Starmer (120), Ben Laity (117), Hezron Murgha (103) and Joel Riethmuller (100).
  This was the Pride debut for Colin Wilkie and Rajan Opetaia-Halls (Pride Players 125 & 126). Wilkie last played QCup nine years ago for the North Queensland Young Guns.

Position	Round 5 – 2016	P	W	D	L	B	For	Against	Diff	Pts
6	Northern Pride	4	2	0	2	1	114	101	+13	6

ROUND 6: Intrust Super Cup 2016

Sunday
10 April 2016
15:00 AEST (UTC+10)

Northern Pride	48 – 0	Tweed Heads Seagulls
Tries: Brayden Torpy 1 Luke George 2 Tom Hancock 2 Link Port 1 Shaun Hudson* 1 Patrick Kaufusi* 1 Goals: Khan Ahwang (8 from 8) 8	Half-time: 30 – 0 Penalties: 10 – 5 QRL Report	Tries: Goals:

Barlow Park
(Severin Street, Parramatta Park, QLD)
Referee: Nicholas Pelgrave.
Interchange Official: Pietro Narducci.
Touch Judges: Kurt Igesund & Stephen Kanowski.

Sea Swift Northern Pride: 1. Linc Port – FB 2. Khan Ahwang – WG 3. Shaun Hudson* – CE 4. Justin Castellaro – CE 5. Luke George – WG 6. Jared Allen – FE 7. Brayden Torpy – HB 8. David Murphy – PR 9. Ryan Ghietti (c) – HK 10. Patrick Kaufusi* – PR 11. Vaipuna Tia-Kilifi – SR 12. Jack Svendsen – SR 13. Ben Spina* – LK
Interchange: 14. Denzel King, 15. Tom Hancock, 16. Sheldon Powe-Hobbs, 18. Colin Wilkie.
* = Cowboys allocation (3 players allocated for this match).
Unavailable: Javid Bowen* (selected for North Queensland Cowboys.
Pride Out: Rajan Opetaia-Halls (bench).
Pride In: Sheldon Powe-Hobbs (bench).
Tweed Heads Seagulls: 1. Shannon Walker, 2. Leva Li, 3. James Wood, 4. Shaun Carney, 5. Nathanael Barnes, 6. Samuel Irwin, 7. Karl Lawton, 8. William Bugden, 9. Sam Meskell (c), 10. Mitchell Sharp, 11. Cory Blair, 12. Matthew Robinson, 13. Sam Saville (c).
Interchange: 15. Blake Anderson, 16. Dane Clarke, 17. Jackson Clarke, 18. Tevita Folau.
Coach: Aaron Zimmerle.

Position	Round 6 – 2016	P	W	D	L	B	For	Against	Diff	Pts
5	Northern Pride	5	3	0	2	1	162	101	+61	8

ROUND 7: Intrust Super Cup 2016

Sunday
17 April 2016
15:00 AEST (UTC+10)

Northern Pride	30 – 16	Easts Tigers
Tries: Khan Ahwang 2 Javid Bowen* 2 Tom Hancock 1 Goals: Khan Ahwang (4 from 5) 4 Penalty Goal; Khan Ahwang 1	Half-time: 10 – 10; Penalties: 11 – 5 QRL Report	Tries: 1 Ayden Lee; 1 Whetu Austin; 1 Brentt Warr; Goals: 2 Billy Walters (2 from 3)

Barlow Park
(Severin Street, Parramatta Park, QLD)
Referee: Christopher Anderson.
Interchange Official: Pietro Narducci.
Touch Judges: Alexander Mallory & Peter Mackinnon.

Sea Swift Northern Pride: 1. Linc Port – FB 2. Khan Ahwang – WG 3. Javid Bowen* – CE 4. Shaun Hudson* – CE 5. Justin Castellaro – WG 6. Jared Allen – FE 7. Brayden Torpy – HB 8. David Murphy – PR 9. Ryan Ghietti (c) – HK 10. Ben Spina* – PR 11. Vaipuna Tia-Kilifi – SR 12. Jack Svendsen – SR 13. Tom Hancock – LK
Interchange: 14. Jordan Biondi-Odo, 15. Colin Wilkie, 16. Sheldon Powe-Hobbs, 17. Akeripa Tia-Kilifi.
* = Cowboys allocation (3 players allocated for this match).
Pride Out: Luke George (wing), Patrick Kaufusi* (front row), Denzel King (bench).
Pride In: Javid Bowen* (centre), Jordan Biondi-Odo (bench), Akeripa Tia-Kilifi (bench).
Changes: Justin Castellaro (centre to wing), Ben Spina* (lock to front row), Tom Hancock (bench to lock).
Easts Tigers: 1. Guy Hamilton, 2. Suliasi Vunivalu, 3. Jamie Anderson, 4. Luke Lavelle, 17. Whetu Austin, 6. Billy Walters, 7. Brentt Warr, 8. Matt White, 9. Chris Ostwald, 10. Matthew Zgrajewski, 11. Ayden Lee , 12. Dane Hogan (c), 13. Dean Britt.
Interchange: 14. Francis Tualau, 15. Liam McDonald, 16. Christian Welch, 18. Foisa Peni.
Coach: Scott Sipple.

Position	Round 7 – 2016	P	W	D	L	B	For	Against	Diff	Pts
3	Northern Pride	6	4	0	2	1	192	117	+75	10

ROUND 8: Intrust Super Cup 2016 – ANZAC Round

Sunday
24 April 2016
16:00 AEST (UTC+10)

Townsville Blackhawks	26 – 13	Northern Pride
Tries: Jonathon Reuben 2 Brenden Santi 1 Kyle Laybutt 1 Nathan Norford 1 Goals: Kyle Laybutt (3 from 5) 3	Half-time: 8 – 13; Penalties: 5 – 8 QRL Report	Tries: 1 Jared Allen; 1 Jack Svendsen Goals: 2 Khan Ahwang (2 from 2); Field Goal: 1 Brayden Torpy

Jack Manski Oval
(Golf Links Drive, Kirwan, QLD)
Referee: Jarrod Cole.
Interchange Official: Shane Culling.
Touch Judges: Anthony Spittles & Zachary Schembi.

Sea Swift Northern Pride: 1. Linc Port – FB 2. Khan Ahwang – WG 3. Javid Bowen* – CE 4. Shaun Hudson* – CE 5. Justin Castellaro – WG 6. Jared Allen – FE 7. Brayden Torpy – HB 8. David Murphy – PR 9. Ryan Ghietti (c) – HK 10. Ben Spina* – PR 11. Vaipuna Tia-Kilifi – SR 12. Jack Svendsen – SR 13. Tom Hancock – LK
Interchange: 14. Denzel King, 15. Colin Wilkie, 16. Sheldon Powe-Hobbs, 17. Frederick Koraba.
* = Cowboys allocation (3 players allocated for this match).
Unavailable: Patrick Kaufusi* (selected to debut for North Queensland Cowboys, Ben Spina*.
Pride Out: Jordan Biondi-Odo (bench), Akeripa Tia-Kilifi (bench).
Pride In: Denzel King (bench), Frederick Koraba (bench).
Townsville Blackhawks: 1. Jahrome Hughes, 2. Jonathon Reuben, 3. Moses Pangai, 4. Hezron Murgha, 5. Samsen O'Neill, 6. Kyle Laybutt, 7. Michael Parker-Walshe, 8. Glenn Hall (c), 9. Anthony Mitchell (c), 10. Corey Jensen, 11. Noel Underwood, 12. Rhyse Martin, 13. David Munro.
Interchange: 14. Nathan Norford 15. Lona Kaifoto, 16. Willie Minoga, 17. Brenden Santi.
Coach: Kristian Woolf.
- Note: This was the Pride debut for Frederick Koraba (Pride Player 127).

Position	Round 8 – 2016	P	W	D	L	B	For	Against	Diff	Pts
4	Northern Pride	7	4	0	3	1	205	143	+62	10

ROUND 9: Intrust Super Cup 2016

Sunday
1 May 2016
15:00 AEST (UTC+10)

Northern Pride	6 – 34	Wynnum Manly Seagulls
Tries: Javid Bowen* 1 Goals: Khan Ahwang (1 from 1) 1	Half-time: 6 – 16; Penalties: 9 – 3 QRL Report	Tries: 1 Peter Gubb; 1 Mitchell Moore; 1 Patrick Templeman; 1 Mitchell Buckett; 1 Greg Eden; 1 Mitchell Cronin; Goals: 5 Patrick Templeman (5 from 6)

Barlow Park
(Severin Street, Parramatta Park, QLD)
Referee: Nicholas Morel
Interchange Official: Pietro Narducci
Touch Judges: Kane Schwartz & Peter Mackinnon

Sea Swift Northern Pride: 1. Linc Port – FB 2. Khan Ahwang – WG 3. Javid Bowen* – CE 4. Shaun Hudson* – CE 5. Justin Castellaro – WG 6. Jared Allen – FE 7. Brayden Torpy – HB 8. David Murphy – PR 9. Ryan Ghietti (c) – HK 10. Ben Spina* – PR 11. Vaipuna Tia-Kilifi – SR 12. Jack Svendsen – SR 13. Tom Hancock – LK
Interchange: 14. Denzel King, 15. Colin Wilkie, 16. Sheldon Powe-Hobbs, 17. Frederick Koraba.
* = Cowboys allocation (3 players allocated for this match).
Unavailable: Patrick Kaufusi* (selected for North Queensland Cowboys.
Pride Out: Ben Spina* (front row), Denzel King (bench).
Pride In: Jordan Biondi-Odo (bench), Rajan Opetaia-Halls (bench).
Changes: Sheldon Powe-Hobbs (bench to front row).
Wynnum-Manly Seagulls: 1. Greg Eden, 2. Peter Gubb, 3. Mitchell Cronin, 4. Mitchell Buckett, 5. Daniel Ogden, 6. Patrick Templeman (c), 7. Matthew Smith, 8. Magnus Stromquist, 9. Mitchell Moore, 10. Benjamin Shea, 11. Alex Barr, 12. Jon Grieve, 13. Aaron Rockley.
Interchange: 14. Alehana Mara, 15. Nicholas Harrold, 16. Stephen Coombe, 17. Salesi Funaki.
Coach: Jon Buchanan.

Position	Round 9 – 2016	P	W	D	L	B	For	Against	Diff	Pts
6	Northern Pride	8	4	0	4	1	211	177	+34	10

ROUND 10: Intrust Super Cup 2016 – Indigenous Appreciation Round

Sunday
15 May 2016
13:40 AEST (UTC+10)

Northern Pride	20 – 16	Redcliffe Dolphins
Tries: Javid Bowen* 2 Ryan Ghietti 1 Khan Ahwang 1 Goals: Khan Ahwang (2 from 4) 2	Half-time: 16 – 6 Penalties: 3 – 4 QRL Report	Tries: 1 Anthony Cherrington; 2 Samuel Anderson Goals: 2 Darren Nicholls (2 from 3)

Barlow Park
(Severin Street, Parramatta Park, QLD)
Referee: Christopher Anderson, Nicholas Pelgrave.
Interchange Official: Pietro Narducci.
Touch Judges: Kane Schwartz & Peter Mackinnon.

Sea Swift Northern Pride: 1. Linc Port – FB 2. Khan Ahwang – WG 3. Javid Bowen* – CE 4. Shaun Hudson* – CE 5. Justin Castellaro – WG 6. Jared Allen – FE 7. Brayden Torpy – HB 8. Sheldon Powe-Hobbs – PR 9. Ryan Ghietti (c) – HK 10. Ben Spina* – PR 11. Vaipuna Tia-Kilifi – SR 12. Tom Hancock – SR 13. Jack Svendsen – LK
Interchange: 14. Jordan Biondi-Odo, 15. Colin Wilkie, 16. David Murphy, 17. Luke George.
* = Cowboys allocation (3 players allocated for this match).
Unavailable: Patrick Kaufusi* (selected for North Queensland Cowboys.
Pride Out: Rajan Opetaia-Halls (bench), Frederick Koraba (bench).
Pride In: Ben Spina* (front row), Luke George (bench).
Changes: David Murphy (front row to bench), Jack Svendsen (second row to lock), Tom Hancock (lock to second row)
Redcliffe Dolphins: 1. Luke Capewell, 2. Jonus Pearson, 3. Jack Ahearn, 4. Daniel Randall, 5. Thomas Opacic, 6. Zach Strasser, 7. Darren Nicholls, 8. Samuel Anderson (c), 9. Shane Pumipi, 10. Rulon Nutira, 11. Anthony Cherrington, 12. Johnnie Fox, 13. Christopher Gesch.
Interchange: 14. Christian Hazard, 15. Tyson Andrews, 16. Charlie Faingaa, 22. Joseph Bradley.
Coach: Adam Mogg.
- Note: This match was shown live on Channel 9 with Matthew Thompson, Scott Sattler and Peter Psaltis as the commentary team.

Position	Round 10 – 2016	P	W	D	L	B	For	Against	Diff	Pts
6	Northern Pride	9	5	0	4	1	231	193	+38	12

ROUND 11: Intrust Super Cup 2016

Saturday
21 May 2016
19:00 AEST (UTC+10)

Northern Pride	14 – 24	Burleigh Bears
Tries: Justin Castellaro 1 Luke George 1 Khan Ahwang 1 Goals: Khan Ahwang (1 from 3) 1	Half-time: 0 – 14; Penalties: 10 – 8 QRL Report	Tries: 1 Hayden Schwass; 1 Kurtis Rowe; 1 Waka Wanahi; 1 Oliver Regan; Goals: 3 Jamal Fogarty (3 from 4); Penalty Goal: 1 Jamal Fogarty

Roosters Stadium Atherton
(Atherton Showgrounds, Louise Street, Atherton, QLD)
Referee: Michael Gordon
Interchange Official: Pietro Narducci
Touch Judges: Kurt Igesund & Peter Mackinnon

Sea Swift Northern Pride: 1. Linc Port – FB 2. Khan Ahwang – WG 3. Javid Bowen* – CE 4. Shaun Hudson* – CE 5. Justin Castellaro – WG 6. Jared Allen – FE 7. Brayden Torpy – HB 8. Sheldon Powe-Hobbs – PR 9. Ryan Ghietti (c) – HK 10. Ben Spina* – PR 11. Vaipuna Tia-Kilifi – SR 12. Tom Hancock – SR 13. Jack Svendsen – LK
Interchange: 14. Jordan Biondi-Odo, 15. Colin Wilkie, 16. David Murphy, 17. Luke George.
* = Cowboys allocation (3 players allocated for this match).
Unavailable: Patrick Kaufusi* (selected for North Queensland Cowboys.
Changes: None, same squad as last week.
Burleigh Bears: 1. Kurtis Rowe, 2. Waka Wanahi, 3. Sami Sauiluma, 4. Connor Broadhurst, 5. Oliver Regan, 6. Cameron Cullen, 7. Jamal Fogarty (c), 8. Luke Page, 9. Patrick Politoni, 10. Paterika Vaivai, 11. Louis Fanene, 12. Hayden Schwass, 13. Jeffrey Lynch.
Interchange: 14. Thomas Rowles, 15. Nathaniel Peteru, 16. Joshua Ailaomai, 17. Lachlan Burr.
Coach: Jim Lenihan.

Position	Round 11 – 2016	P	W	D	L	B	For	Against	Diff	Pts
6	Northern Pride	11	5	0	5	1	245	217	+28	12

ROUND 12: Intrust Super Cup 2016

Sunday
29 May 2016
15:00 AEST (UTC+10)

Northern Pride	18 – 24	Souths Logan Magpies
Tries: Jared Allen 1 Linc Port 1 Khan Ahwang 1 Goals: Khan Ahwang (3 from 3) 3	Half-time: 6 – 12; Penalties: 3 – 1 QRL Report	Tries: 1 Luke Archer; 1 Marion Seve; 1 Scott Doyle; 1 George Fai; Goals: 3 Scott Doyle (3 from 4); Penalty Goal: 1 Scott Doyle

Barlow Park
(Severin Street, Parramatta Park, QLD)
Referee: Clayton Sharpe.
Interchange Official: Pietro Narducci.
Touch Judges: Kurt Igesund & Peter Mackinnon.

Sea Swift Northern Pride: 1. Linc Port – FB 2. Khan Ahwang – WG 3. Justin Castellaro – CE 4. Shaun Hudson* – CE 5. Luke George – WG 6. Jared Allen – FE 7. Brayden Torpy – HB 8. Sheldon Powe-Hobbs – PR 9. Ryan Ghietti (c) – HK 10. Ben Spina* – PR 11. Vaipuna Tia-Kilifi – SR 12. Tom Hancock – SR 13. Jack Svendsen – LK
Interchange: 14. Jordan Biondi-Odo, 15. Colin Wilkie, 16. David Murphy, 17. Rajan Opetaia-Halls.
* = Cowboys allocation (3 players allocated for this match).
Unavailable: Patrick Kaufusi* and Javid Bowen* (selected to play for North Queensland Cowboys)
Pride Out: Javid Bowen* (centre).
Pride In: Rajan Opetaia-Halls (bench).
Changes: Justin Castellaro (wing to centre), Luke George (bench to wing).
Souths Logan Magpies: 1. Jack Joass, 2. Cameron Booth, 3. Scott Doyle, 4. Marion Seve, 5. Luke Archer, 6. Phillip Dennis (c), 7. Samuel Scarlett, 8. Aotealofa Tuimavave, 9. Travis Waddell, 10. Andrew Edwards, 11. Leon Panapa, 12. Daniel Tamou, 13. Joseph Boyce.
Interchange: 14. Jack Anderson, 16. George Fai, 17. Daniel Russell, 18. Bradley Frith, 20. Taeao Kepu.
Unavailable: Herman Ese'ese.
Coach: Josh Hannay.
- Note: Jack Svendsen was placed on report for a shoulder charge.
  Ben Spina* suffered an ankle injury.

Position	Round 12 – 2016	P	W	D	L	B	For	Against	Diff	Pts
7	Northern Pride	12	5	0	6	1	263	241	+22	12

ROUND 13: Intrust Super Cup 2016

Saturday
4 June 2016
19:30 PNG Pacific Time (UTC+10)

Papua New Guinea Hunters	22 – 6	Northern Pride
Tries: Adam Korave 1 Philimon Kimisive 1 Thompson Teteh 1 Wartovo Puara 1 Goals: Noel Zeming (3 from 4) 3	Half-time: 6 – 6 Penalties: 5 – 6 QRL Report	Tries: 1 Sheldon Powe-Hobbs Goals: 1 Khan Ahwang (1 from 1)

Sir John Guise Stadium
(Port Moresby, PNG)
Referee: Jarrod Cole.
Interchange Official: Daniele Gicliotti.
Touch Judges: Dan Munroe & Joshua Kersevani.

Sea Swift Northern Pride: 1. Linc Port – FB 2. Khan Ahwang – WG 3. Javid Bowen* – CE 4. Shaun Hudson* – CE 5. Justin Castellaro – WG 19. Ryan Ghietti (c) – FE 7. Brayden Torpy – HB 8. Sheldon Powe-Hobbs – PR 9. Jordan Biondi-Odo – HK 10. Ben Spina* – PR 11. Colin Wilkie – SR 12. Tom Hancock – SR 13. Rajan Opetaia-Halls – LK
Interchange: 14. Jared Allen, 15. Vaipuna Tia-Kilifi, 16. David Murphy, 17. Luke George.
* = Cowboys allocation (3 players allocated for this match).
Unavailable: Jack Svendsen (one week ban for a shoulder charge), Patrick Kaufusi*.
Pride Out: Jack Svendsen (lock).
Pride In: Javid Bowen* (centre).
Changes: Justin Castellaro (centre to wing), Luke George (wing to bench), Jared Allen (five-eighth to bench), Ryan Ghietti (c) (hooker to five-eighth), Vaipuna Tia Kilifi (second row to bench), Jordan Biondi-Odo (bench to hooker), Colin Wilkie (bench to second row), Rajan Opetaia-Halls (bench to lock).
PNG Hunters: 1. Oti Tony (Bland Abavu), 2. Justin Olam, 3. Noel Zeming (c), 4. Thompson Teteh, 5. Philimon Kimisive, 6. Ase Boas, 7. Watson Boas, 8. Henry Noki, 9. Wartovo Puara, 10. Esau Siune, 11. Ishamel Baikawa, 12. Adam Korave, (c) 13. Tuvi Lepan.
Interchange: 14. Warren Glare, 15 Benjamin Hetra, 16. Enock Maki, 17. Nickson Borana, 18. Brandy Peter, 19. Atte Bina, 20. Butler Morris.
Coach: Michael Marum.

Position	Round 13 – 2016	P	W	D	L	B	For	Against	Diff	Pts
7	Northern Pride	12	5	0	7	1	269	263	+6	12

ROUND 14: Intrust Super Cup 2016

Sunday 12
June 2016
15:00 AEST (UTC+10)

Northern Pride	32 – 12	Sunshine Coast Falcons
Tries: Justin Castellaro 2 Khan Ahwang 1 Colin Wilkie 1 Shaun Hudson* 1 Goals: Khan Ahwang (5 from 5) 5 Penalty Goal: Khan Ahwang 1	Half-time: 18 – 0 Penalties: 4 – 14; QRL Report	Tries: 1 Ryley Jacks; 1 Mark Nicholls Goals: 2 Tony Tumusa (2 from 2)

Barlow Park
(Severin Street, Parramatta Park, QLD)
Referee: Nicholas Morel.
Interchange Official: Pietro Narducci.
Touch Judges: Kane Schwartz & Peter Mackinnon.

Sea Swift Northern Pride: 1. Linc Port – FB 2. Khan Ahwang – WG 3. Javid Bowen* – CE 4. Shaun Hudson* – CE 5. Justin Castellaro – WG 6. Ryan Ghietti (c) – FE 7. Brayden Torpy – HB 8. Ben Spina* – PR 9. Jordan Biondi-Odo – HK 10. Patrick Kaufusi* – PR 11. Coen Hess* – SR 12. Tom Hancock – SR 13. Colin Wilkie – LK
Interchange: 14. Jared Allen, 15. Sheldon Powe-Hobbs, 16. David Murphy, 17. Vaipuna Tia-Kilifi.
* = Cowboys allocation (3 players allocated for this match).
Out: Rajan Opetaia-Halls (lock), Luke George (bench).
In: Patrick Kaufusi* (front row), Coen Hess* (second row).
Changes: Sheldon Powe-Hobbs (front row to bench), Colin Wilkie (second row to lock).
Sunshine Coast Falcons: 1. Eddie Tautali, 2. Tony Tumusa, 3. Curtis Scott, 4. Richard Kennar, 5. Rowan Klein, 6. Alex Bishop, 7. Ryley Jacks, 18. Erevonu Kamikamica, 9. Jake Turpin, 10. Martin Cordwell, 11. Joe Stimson, 12. Mark Nicholls, 13. Troy Giess (c).
Interchange: 14. Nafe Seluini, 15. Jake Thompson, 16. Thomas Geraghty, 17. Jye Ballinger, 19. Callum Klein.
Coach: Craig Ingebrigtsen.
- Note: This was the Pride debut for North Queensland Cowboys allocation player Coen Hess* (Pride Player 128).

Position	Round 14 – 2016	P	W	D	L	B	For	Against	Diff	Pts
7	Northern Pride	13	6	0	7	1	301	275	+26	14

ROUND 15: Intrust Super Cup 2016

Saturday
18 June 2016
18:00 AEST (UTC+10)

Mackay Cutters	18 – 22	Northern Pride
Tries: Blake Atherton 1 Jack Crieth 1 Joss Boyton 1 Goals: Liam Taylor (3 from 3) 3	Half-time: 12 – 0 Penalties: 8 – 5 QRL Report	Tries: 2 Ryan Ghietti; 1 Colin Wilkie; 1 Javid Bowen*; Goals: 3 Khan Ahwang (3 from 4)

Virgin Australia Stadium
(Bridge Road, South Mackay, QLD)
Referee: Clayton Sharpe.
Interchange Official: Kevin Valentine.
Touch Judges: Kurt Sheater & Christian Strang.

Sea Swift Northern Pride: 1. Linc Port – FB 2. Khan Ahwang – WG 3. Javid Bowen* – CE 4. Shaun Hudson* – CE 5. Justin Castellaro – WG 6. Ryan Ghietti (c) – FE 7. Brayden Torpy – HB 8. Ben Spina* – PR 9. Jordan Biondi-Odo – HK 10. Patrick Kaufusi* – PR 11. Coen Hess* – SR 12. Rajan Opetaia-Halls – SR 13. Vaipuna Tia-Kilifi – LK
Interchange: 14. Jared Allen, 15. Sheldon Powe-Hobbs, 16. David Murphy, 17. Colin Wilkie.
* = Cowboys allocation (4 players allocated for this match).
Pride Out: Tom Hancock (second row).
Pride In: Rajan Opetaia-Halls (second row).
Changes: Colin Wilkie (lock to bench), Vaipuna Tia Kilifi (bench to lock).
Mackay Cutters: 1. Liam Taylor, 2. Jordan Pereira, 4. Jack Crieth, 18. Tautau Moga, 5. Blake Atherton, 6. Cooper Bambling, 7. Delayne Ashby, 8. Ryan Kinlyside, 9. Joshua Chudleigh, 10. Braden Uele, 11. Andrew Davey, 12. Brenden Treston, 13. Isaac Richardson.
Interchange: 14. Jacob Pottinger, 15. Dalton Phillips, 16. Joss Boyton, 17. Wiremu Weepu.
Coach: Jim Wilson.

Position	Round 15 – 2016	P	W	D	L	B	For	Against	Diff	Pts
7	Northern Pride	14	7	0	7	1	323	293	+30	16

ROUND 16: Intrust Super Cup 2016

Saturday
25 June 2016
17:00 AEST (UTC+10)

Easts Tigers	26 – 24	Northern Pride
Tries: Matthew Zgrajewski 1 Javarn White 1 Brentt Warr 1 Leon Ellia-Niukore 1 Goals: Brodie Croft (4 from 4) 4 Penalty Goal: Brodie Croft 1	Half-time: 20 – 12; Penalties: 1 – 3 QRL Report	Tries: 1 Sheldon Powe-Hobbs; 1 Justin Castellaro; 1 Ryan Ghietti; 1 Linc Port; Goals: 4 Khan Ahwang (4 from 4)

Suzuki Stadium
(Stones Corner, Brisbane, QLD)
Referee: Clayton Sharpe.
Interchange Official: Matthew Sosimenko.
Touch Judges: Marcus Schooth & Benjamin Watts.

Sea Swift Northern Pride: 1. Linc Port – FB 2. Khan Ahwang – WG 3. Javid Bowen* – CE 4. Shaun Hudson* – CE 5. Justin Castellaro – WG 9. Ryan Ghietti (c) – FE 7. Brayden Torpy – HB 8. Ben Spina* – PR 6. Jordan Biondi-Odo – HK 17. Rajan Opetaia-Halls – PR 11. Coen Hess* – SR 12. Benjamin Reuter – SR 16. David Murphy – LK
Interchange: 13. Vaipuna Tia-Kilifi, 14. Jared Allen, 15. Sheldon Powe-Hobbs, 18. Keelan White.
* = Cowboys allocation (3 players allocated for this match).
Pride Out: Patrick Kaufusi* (front row), Colin Wilkie (bench).
Pride In: Benjamin Reuter (second row), Keelan White (bench).
Changes: Rajan Opetaia-Halls (second row to front row), Vaipuna Tia Kilifi (lock to bench), David Murphy (bench to lock).
Easts Tigers: 1. Javarn White, 2. Dane Chang, 3. Shane Neumann, 4. Jamie Anderson, 5. Leon Ellia-Niukore, 6. Brentt Warr, 7. Brodie Croft, 8. Francis Tualau, 9. Tom Butterfield, 10. Shane Gillham, 11. Jake Foster, 12. Dane Hogan, 13. John Puna.
Interchange: 14. Matthew Zgrajewski, 15. Mathew Pitman, 16. Guy Hamilton, 17. Slade Griffin, 18. Jacob Paul, 19. Sam Bielefeld.
Coach: Scott Sipple.
- Note: This was the Pride debut for Ben Reuter. He was not allocated a player number, but should have been Pride Player 129.

Position	Round 16 – 2016	P	W	D	L	B	For	Against	Diff	Pts
7	Northern Pride	15	7	0	8	1	347	319	+28	16

ROUND 17: Intrust Super Cup 2016

2–3 July 2016.

Northern Pride	BYE

Position	Round 17 – 2016	P	W	D	L	B	For	Against	Diff	Pts
6	Northern Pride	15	7	0	8	2	347	319	+28	18

ROUND 18: Intrust Super Cup 2016

Sunday
10 July 2016
15:00 AEST (UTC+10)

Northern Pride	10 – 30	Ipswich Jets
Tries: Vaipuna Tia-Kilifi 1 Linc Port 1 Goals: Khan Ahwang (1 from 2) 1	Half-time: 6 – 14; Penalties: 6 – 5 QRL Report	Tries: 2 Richard Pandia; 1 Mikaere Beattie; 1 Liam Capewell; 1 Ben White; Goals: 3 Wesley Conlon; 1 Mikaere Beattie; Penalty Goal: 1 Wesley Conlon

Barlow Park
(Severin Street, Parramatta Park, QLD)
Referee: Tim Rutherford.
Interchange Official: Pietro Narducci.
Touch Judges: Kurt Igesund & Peter Mackinnon.

Sea Swift Northern Pride: 1. Linc Port – FB 2. Khan Ahwang – WG 3. Greg Miglio – CE 4. Shaun Hudson* – CE 5. Justin Castellaro – WG 9. Ryan Ghietti (c) – FE 7. Brayden Torpy – HB 8. David Murphy – PR 6. Jordan Biondi-Odo – HK 10. Sheldon Powe-Hobbs – PR 11. Tom Hancock – SR 12. Vaipuna Tia-Kilifi – SR 13. Colin Wilkie – LK
Interchange: 14. Jared Allen, 15. Rajan Opetaia-Halls, 16. Luke George, 17. Benjamin Reuter.
* = Cowboys allocation (1 player allocated for this match).
Pride Out: Javid Bowen* (centre), Ben Spina* (front row), Coen Hess* (second row), Keelan White (bench).
Pride In: Greg Miglio (centre), Tom Hancock (second row), Colin Wilkie (lock), Luke George (bench).
Changes: Rajan Opetaia-Halls (front row to bench), Benjamin Reuter (second row to bench), David Murphy (lock to front row), Vaipuna Tia Kilifi (bench to second row), Sheldon Powe-Hobbs (bench to front row)
Ipswich Jets: 1. Wesley Conlon, 18. Michael Purcell, 3. Ben White, 4. Nemani Valekapa, 5. Richard Pandia, 14. Christopher Ash, 7. Dane Phillips, 22. Tyson Lofipo, 9. Mikaere Beattie, 16. Billy McConnachie, 21. Jesse Roberts, 11. Samuel Martin, 10. Nathaniel Neale.
Interchange: 6. Haydan Lipp, 8. David Fa'alogo, 12. Liam Capewell, 13. Fakahoko Teutau, 15. Sebastian Pandia.
Coaches: Ben Walker and Shane Walker.
- Note: This was the Pride debut for Greg Miglio (Pride Player 139).

Position	Round 18 – 2016	P	W	D	L	B	For	Against	Diff	Pts
6	Northern Pride	16	7	0	9	2	357	349	+8	18

ROUND 19: Intrust Super Cup 2016 – Men of League / Foundation Round

Saturday
16 July 2016
18:00 AEST (UTC+10)

Wynnum Manly Seagulls	28 – 8	Northern Pride
Tries: Nicholas Harrold 1 Patrick Templeman 1 Daniel Ogden 1 Alex Barr 1 Goals: Matt Seamark (4 from 4) 4 Penalty Goals: Matt Seamark 1 Patrick Templeman 1	Half-time: 22 – 0 Penalties: 10 – 8 QRL Report	Tries: 1 Luke George; 1 Khan Ahwang Goals: 0 Khan Ahwang (0 from 2)

BMD Kougari Oval
(Manly West, Brisbane, QLD)
Referee: Liam Kennedy.
Interchange Official: Matthew Sosimenko.
Touch Judges: Andrew Wareham & Peter Anderson.

Sea Swift Northern Pride: 1. Linc Port – FB 2. Khan Ahwang – WG 3. Justin Castellaro – CE 4. Shaun Hudson* – CE 5. Luke George – WG 9. Ryan Ghietti (c) – FE 7. Brayden Torpy – HB 10. Sheldon Powe-Hobbs – PR 6. Jordan Biondi-Odo – HK 15. Rajan Opetaia-Halls – PR 11. Tom Hancock – SR 12. Vaipuna Tia Kilifi – SR 13. Ben Spina* – LK
Interchange: 8. David Murphy, 14. Jared Allen, 16. Aidan Day, 17. Colin Wilkie.
* = Cowboys allocation (3 players allocated for this match).
Pride Out: Greg Miglio (centre), Benjamin Reuter (bench).
Pride In: Ben Spina* (lock), Aidan Day (bench).
Changes: Justin Castellaro (wing to centre), David Murphy (front row to bench), Colin Wilkie (lock to bench), Rajan Opetaia-Halls (bench to front row), Luke George (bench to wing).
Wynnum Manly Seagulls: 1. Daniel Ogden, 2. Peter Gubb, 3. Mitchell Cronin, 4. Mitchell Buckett, 19. Hayden Crowley, 6. Patrick Templeman, 7. Matt Seamark, 8. Magnus Stromquist, 9. Alehana Mara, 10. Aaron Rockley, 11. A. Tuimavave-Gerrard, 12. Alex Barr, 13. Nicholas Harrold.
Interchange: 14. Mitchell Moore, 15. Tim Natusch, 16. Salesi Funaki, 17. Stephen Coombe.
Coach: Jon Buchanan.

Position	Round 19 – 2016	P	W	D	L	B	For	Against	Diff	Pts
10	Northern Pride	17	17	7	0	2	365	377	-12	18

ROUND 20: Intrust Super Cup 2016 – Country Week

Sunday
24 July 2016
14:00 AEST (UTC+10)

Redcliffe Dolphins	36 – 6	Northern Pride
Tries: Jack Ahearn 1 Josh Beehag 1 Zach Strasser 1 Dan Randall 1 Jonus Pearson 1 Harley Aiono 1 Goals: Darren Nicholls (5 from 6) 5 Penalty Goal: Darren Nicholls 1	Half-time: 12 – 6 Penalties: 4 – 6 QRL Report	Tries: 1 Justin Castellaro Goals: 1 Khan Ahwang (1 from 1)

Ravenshoe Junior Football Grounds
(Cemetery Road, Ravenshoe, Atherton Tablelands. QLD)
Referee: Clayton Sharpe.
Interchange Official: Pietro Narducci.
Touch Judges: Kane Schwartz & Peter Mackinnon.

Sea Swift Northern Pride: 1. Linc Port – FB 2. Khan Ahwang – WG 3. Justin Castellaro – CE 4. Shaun Hudson* – CE 5. Luke George – WG 6. Jordan Biondi-Odo – FE 7. Brayden Torpy – HB 10. Patrick Kaufusi* – PR 9. Ryan Ghietti (c) – HK 16. David Murphy – PR 11. Coen Hess* – SR 17. Colin Wilkie – SR 8. Ben Spina* – LK
Interchange: 13. Tom Hancock, 14. Jared Allen, 15. Sheldon Powe-Hobbs, 19. Aiden Day.
* = Cowboys allocation (3 players allocated for this match).
Pride Out: Rajan Opetaia-Halls (front row), Vaipuna Tia Kilifi (second row).
Pride In: Patrick Kaufusi* (front row), Coen Hess* (second row).
Changes: Ryan Ghietti (c) (five-eighth to hooker), Jordan Biondi-Odo (hooker to five-eighth), Sheldon Powe-Hobbs (front row to bench), Tom Hancock (second row to bench), David Murphy (bench to front row), Colin Wilkie (bench to second row).
Redcliffe Dolphins: 1. Josh Beehag, 2. Jonus Pearson, 3. Jack Ahearn, 4. Dan Randall, 5. Curtis Johnston, 6. Zach Strasser, 7. Darren Nicholls, 8. Samuel Anderson (c), 9. Shane Pumipi, 10. Charlie Faingaa, 11. Harley Aiono, 12. Daniel Bridge, 13. Christopher Gesch.
Interchange: 14. Christian Hazard, 15. Brandon Lee, 16. Taylor Brown, 17. Johnnie Fox.
Coach: Adam Mogg.

Position	Round 20 – 2016	P	W	D	L	B	For	Against	Diff	Pts
10	Northern Pride	18	7	0	11	2	371	413	-42	18

ROUND 21: Intrust Super Cup 2016

Saturday
30 July 2016
16:00 AEST (UTC+10)

Burleigh Bears	24 – 25	Northern Pride
Tries: Hayden Schwass 1 Kurtis Rowe 1 Jamal Fogarty 1 Jeff Lynch 1 Josh Ailaomai 1 Goals: Jamal Fogarty (2 from 5) 2	Half-time: 18 – 6 Penalties: 5 – 4 QRL Report	Tries: 1 Shaun Hudson*; 1 Coen Hess*; 1 Colin Wilkie; 1 Luke George Goals: 4 Khan Ahwang (4 from 4); Field Goal: 1 Jordon Biondi-Odo

Pizzey Park
(Miami, Gold Coast, QLD)
Referee: Michael Gordon.
Interchange Official: Gavin Adams.
Touch Judges: Damian Brady & Jarrod Cole.

Sea Swift Northern Pride: 1. Linc Port – FB 2. Khan Ahwang – WG 3. Justin Castellaro – CE 4. Shaun Hudson* – CE 5. Luke George – WG 6. Jordan Biondi-Odo – FE 7. Jared Allen – HB 8. Ben Spina* – PR 9. Ryan Ghietti (c) – HK 10. Patrick Kaufusi* – PR 11. Coen Hess* – SR 12. Jack Svendsen – SR 13. Tom Hancock – LK
Interchange: 14. Colin Wilkie, 15. Sheldon Powe-Hobbs, 16. David Murphy, 17. Vaipuna Tia Kilifi.
* = Cowboys allocation (3 players allocated for this match).
Pride Out: Brayden Torpy (halfback), Aidan Day (bench).
Pride In: Jack Svendsen (second row), Vaipuna Tia Kilifi (bench).
Changes: David Murphy (front row to bench), Colin Wilkie (second row to bench), Ben Spina* (lock to front row), Tom Hancock (bench to lock), Jared Allen (bench to halfback).
Burleigh Bears: 1. Kurtis Rowe, 2. Waka Wanahi, 3. Sami Sauiluma, 4. Connor Broadhurst, 5. Olly Regan, 6. Daniel Schwass, 7. Jamal Fogarty, 8. Luke Page, 9. Pat Politini, 18. Nathaniel Peteru, 11. Jamie Dowling, 12. Hayden Schwass, 15. Lachlan Burr.
Interchange: 10. Paterika Vaivai, 13. Jeff Lynch, 16. Josh Ailaomai, 17. Louis Fanene.
Coach: Jim Lenihan.

Position	Round 21 – 2016	P	W	D	L	B	For	Against	Diff	Pts
10	Northern Pride	19	8	0	11	2	396	437	-41	20

ROUND 22: Intrust Super Cup 2016 – Women in League Round

Sunday
7 August 2016
15:00 AEST (UTC+10)

Northern Pride	20 – 22	Townsville Blackhawks
Tries: Greg Miglio 2 Justin Castellaro 1 Jack Svendsen 1 Goals: Khan Ahwang 2 (2 from 4)	Half-time: 14 – 16; Penalties: 7 – 6 QRL Report	Tries: 1 Delouise Hoeter; 1 Moses Pangai; 1 Rhyse Martin; 1 Kyle Laybutt; 1 Anthony Mitchell; Goals: 1 Matt Bowen

Barlow Park
(Severin Street, Parramatta Park, QLD)
Referee: Tim Rutherford.
Interchange Official: Pietro Narducci.
Touch Judges: Kurt Igesund & Kane Schwartz.

Sea Swift Northern Pride: 1. Linc Port – FB 2. Khan Ahwang – WG 3. Justin Castellaro – CE 4. Shaun Hudson* – CE 5. Greg Miglio – WG 6. Jordan Biondi-Odo – FE 7. Jared Allen – HB 8. Ben Spina* – PR 9. Ryan Ghietti (c) – HK 10. Patrick Kaufusi* – PR 11. Coen Hess* – SR 12. Jack Svendsen – SR 13. Tom Hancock – LK
Interchange: 14. Colin Wilkie, 15. Sheldon Powe-Hobbs, 16. Aidan Day, 17. Vaipuna Tia-Kilifi.
* = Cowboys allocation (4 players allocated for this match).
Pride Out: Luke George (wing), David Murphy (bench).
Pride In: Greg Miglio (wing), Aidan Day (bench).
Townsville and District Mendi Blackhawks: 1. Matt Bowen, 2. Samsen O'Neill, 3. Moses Pangai, 4. Delouise Hoeter, 5. Conor Carey, 6. Jahrome Hughes, 7. M. Parker-Walshe, 8. Brenden Santi, 9. Anthony Mitchell, 10. Corey Jensen, 11. Lona Kaifoto, 12. Rhyse Martin, 13. Lorenzo Maafu.
Interchange: 14. Sam Foster, 15. Andrew Niemoeller, 16. Willie Minoga, 17. David Munro, Kyle Laybutt
Coach: Kristian Woolf.

Position	Round 22 – 2016	P	W	D	L	B	For	Against	Diff	Pts
10	Northern Pride	20	8	0	12	2	416	459	-43	20

ROUND 23: Intrust Super Cup 2016

Sunday
14 August 2016
14:00 AEST (UTC+10)

Tweed Heads Seagulls	4 – 30	Northern Pride
Tries: Jacob Garland 1 Goals: 0	Half-time: 0 – 12; Penalties: 13 – 11; QRL Report	Tries: 1 Khan Ahwang (16'); 2 Tom Hancock (24' & 56'); 1 Jordon Biondi-Odo (41'); 1 Jack Svendsen (45'); Goals: 5 Khan Ahwang (5 from 5)

Piggabeen Sports Complex
(Caramar Drive, Tweed Heads West, NSW)
Referee: Liam Kennedy.
Interchange Official: Gavin Adams.
Touch Referees: Alexander Mallory & Rodney Spain.

Sea Swift Northern Pride: 1. Linc Port – FB 2. Khan Ahwang – WG 3. Justin Castellaro – CE 4. Shaun Hudson* – CE 5. Luke George – WG 6. Jordan Biondi-Odo – FE 7. Jared Allen – HB 8. Ben Spina* – PR 9. Ryan Ghietti (c) – HK 10. Sheldon Powe-Hobbs – PR 11. Vaipuna Tia-Kilifi – SR 12. Jack Svendsen – SR 13. Tom Hancock – LK
Interchange: 14. Colin Wilkie, 15. David Murphy, 16. Aidan Day, 17. Benjamin Reuter.
* = Cowboys allocation (2 players allocated for this match).
Pride Out: Greg Miglio (wing), Patrick Kaufusi* (front row), Coen Hess* (second row).
Pride In: Luke George (wing), David Murphy (bench), Benjamin Reuter (bench).
Changes: Sheldon Powe-Hobbs (bench to front row), Vaipuna Tia Kilifi (bench to second row).
Tweed Heads Seagulls: 1. William Zillman, 2. Nathanael Barnes, 3. Leva Li, 4. Timothy Cassidy, 5. Jacob Garland, 6. Samuel Irwin, 7. Michael Burgess, 8. Ethan Price, 9. Sam Meskell (c), 10. William Bugden, 11. Matthew Robinson, 12. Cory Blair, 13. Leivaha Pulu.
Interchange: 14. Doug Hewitt, 15. Josh Coyle, 16. Shawn Anderson, 18. Oshae Tuiasau.
Coach: Aaron Zimmerle.

Position	Round 23 – 2016	P	W	D	L	B	For	Against	Diff	Pts
10	Northern Pride	23	9	0	12	2	446	463	-17	22

ROUND 24: Intrust Super Cup 2016

Sunday
21 August 2016
15:00 AEST (UTC+10)

Northern Pride	40 – 16	Papua New Guinea Hunters
Tries: Sheldon Powe-Hobbs 1 Tom Hancock 1 Javid Bowen* 1 Khan Ahwang 1 Jared Allen 1 Linc Port 1 Justin Castellaro 1 Goals: Khan Ahwang (5 from 7) 5 Penalty Goals: Khan Ahwang 1	Half-time: 26 – 10; Penalties: 9 – 3 QRL Report	Tries: 1 Esau Siune; 1 Timothy Lomai; 1 Butler Morris Goals: 2 Noel Zeming (2 from 3)

Barlow Park
(Severin Street, Parramatta Park, QLD)
Referee: Jarrod Cole.
Interchange Official: Pietro Narducci.
Touch Judges: Kurt Igesund & Peter Mackinnon.

Sea Swift Northern Pride: 1. Linc Port – FB 2. Khan Ahwang – WG 3. Justin Castellaro – CE 4. Javid Bowen* – CE 5. Luke George – WG 6. Jordan Biondi-Odo – FE 7. Jared Allen – HB 8. David Murphy – PR 9. Ryan Ghietti (c) – HK 10. Sheldon Powe-Hobbs – PR 11. Vaipuna Tia-Kilifi – SR 12. Tom Hancock – SR 13. Jack Svendsen – LK
Interchange: 14. Colin Wilkie, 15. Rajan Opetaia-Halls, 16. Aidan Day, 17. Benjamin Reuter.
* = Cowboys allocation (1 player allocated for this match).
Pride Out: Shaun Hudson* (centre), Ben Spina* (front row).
Pride In: Javid Bowen* (centre), Rajan Opetaia-Halls (bench).
Changes: Jack Svendsen (second row to lock), Tom Hancock (lock to second row), David Murphy (bench to front row).
PNG Hunters: 1. Stargroth Amean, 2. Butler Morris, 3. Noel Zeming, 4. Edward Goma, 5. Philimon Kimisive, 6. Ase Boas, 7. Watson Boas, 8. Enock Maki, 9. Warren Glare, 10. Esau Siune, 11. Timothy Lomai, 12. Ishamel Baikawa, 13. Brandy Peter.
Interchange: 14. Gahuna Silas, 15. Adam Korave, 16. Benjamin Hetra, 17. Nickson Borana.
Coach: Michael Marum.

Position	Round 24 – 2016	P	W	D	L	B	For	Against	Diff	Pts
8	Northern Pride	24	10	0	12	2	486	479	+7	24

ROUND 25: Intrust Super Cup 2016 – Turn To Me Round

Saturday
27 August 2016
18:00 AEST (UTC+10)

CQ Capras	16 – 30	Northern Pride
Tries: Junior Kirisome 1 Brandon Manase 1 Chanel Seigafo 1 Goals: 0	Half-time: 0 – 12; Penalties: 6 – 6 QRL Report	Tries: 2 Linc Port; 1 Khan Ahwang; 1 Sheldon Powe-Hobbs; 1 Colin Wilkie; Goals: 5 Khan Ahwang (5 from 5)

Browne Park
(Wandal, Rockhampton, QLD)
Referee: Nicholas Pelgrave.
Interchange Official: Lachlan Wells.
Touch Judges: Cameron Shearer & Shannon Bellette.

Sea Swift Northern Pride: 1. Linc Port – FB 2. Khan Ahwang – WG 3. Javid Bowen* – CE 4. Shaun Hudson* – CE 5. Justin Castellaro – WG 6. Jordan Biondi-Odo – FE 7. Jared Allen – HB 8. Ben Spina* – PR 9. Ryan Ghietti (c) – HK 10. Sheldon Powe-Hobbs – PR 11. Vaipuna Tia-Kilifi – SR 12. Tom Hancock – SR 13. Jack Svendsen – LK
Interchange: 14. Colin Wilkie, 15. Benjamin Reuter, 16. Aidan Day, 17. Rajan Opetaia-Halls.
* = Cowboys allocation (3 players allocated for this match).
Pride Out: Luke George (wing), David Murphy (front row).
Pride In: Shaun Hudson* (centre), Ben Spina* (front row).
Changes: Justin Castellaro (centre to wing).
CQ Capras: 1. Reece Baker, 2. Chanel Seigafo, 4. Justin Tavae, 3. Brandon Manase, 5. Junior Kirisome, 6. Maipele Morseau, 7. Matt Minto, 8. Gavin Hiscox, 14. Charles Bouzinac, 10. Jack Kavanagh, 11. Vic Halfpenny, 12. Guy Williams, 13. Samson Graham.
Interchange: 9. Joshua Mitchell, 15. Aleki Falepaini, 16. William Cullen, 19. Jake Ainsworth, 20. Ayden Cooper, 22. John Filipo.
Coach: Kim Williams.
- Note: Severasl players left the club at the end of the season, including: Linc Port, Vaipuna Tia-Kilifi, Rajan Opetaia-Halls, David Murphy, Brayden Torpy and Greg Miglio.
  This was the last game for coach Joe O' Callaghan who completed his two-year contract. Next season he will be replaced by Ty Williams.
  Khan Ahwang was the highest point scorer in the regular season with 204 points.

Position	Round 25 – 2016	P	W	D	L	B	For	Against	Diff	Pts
8	Northern Pride	23	11	0	12	2	516	495	+21	26

=== 2016 Ladder ===
	Team	Pld	W	D	L	B	PF	PA	PD	Pts
1	Redcliffe Dolphins	23	18	0	5	2	728	345	+383	40
2	Burleigh Bears	23	17	1	5	2	680	497	+183	39
3	Townsville Blackhawks	23	16	1	6	2	694	403	+291	37
4	Papua New Guinea Hunters	23	15	0	8	2	541	421	+120	34
5	Sunshine Coast Falcons	23	12	1	10	2	501	462	+39	29
6	Easts Tigers	23	11	2	10	2	563	520	+43	28
7	Souths Logan Magpies	23	11	2	10	2	587	590	-3	28
8	Northern Pride	23	11	0	12	2	516	495	+21	26
9	Ipswich Jets	23	11	0	12	2	562	555	+7	26
10	Wynnum Manly Seagulls	23	10	0	13	2	547	561	-14	24
11	Norths Devils	23	8	1	14	2	532	686	-154	21
12	CQ Capras	23	6	1	16	2	440	756	-316	17
13	Tweed Heads Seagulls	23	6	0	17	2	393	728	-335	16
14	Mackay Cutters	23	4	1	18	2	468	733	-265	13

==== Northern Pride (regular season 2016) ====
- Win = 11 (6 of 12 home games, 5 of 11 away games)
- Loss = 12 (7 of 12 home games, 5 of 11 away games)

Round	1	2	3	4	5	6	7	8	9	10	11	12	13	14	15	16	17	18	19	20	21	22	23	24	25
Result	L	W	L	B	W	W	W	L	L	W	L	L	L	W	W	L	B	L	L	L	W	L	W	W	W
Ground	A	H	A	B	A	H	H	A	H	H	H	H	A	H	A	A	B	H	A	A	A	H	A	H	A

Source: https://web.archive.org/web/20120916041305/http://www.qrl.com.au/
A = Away; H = Home; B = Bye; W = Win; D = Draw; L = Loss; P = Postpone

== 2016 Northern Pride players ==
Pride player	Appearances	Tries	Goals	Field goals	Pts
Aidan Day	6	0	0	0	0
Akeripa Tia-Kilifi	4	0	0	0	0
Benjamin Reuter	5	0	0	0	0
Brayden Torpy	18	2	0	1	9
Colin Wilkie	19	5	0	0	20
David Murphy	21	0	0	0	0
Denzel King	7	0	0	0	0
Frederick Koraba	2	0	0	0	0
Greg Miglio	2	2	0	0	8
Jack Svendsen	16	5	0	0	20
Jared Allen	23	4	0	0	16
Jordan Biondi-Odo	16	1	0	1	5
Justin Castellaro	21	7	0	0	28
Keelan White	1	0	0	0	0
Khan Ahwang	23	13	77	0	206
Linc Port	23	12	0	0	48
Luke George	15	6	0	0	24
Rajan Opetaia-Halls	9	0	0	0	0
Ryan Ghietti	23	6	0	0	24
Sheldon Powe-Hobbs	22	6	0	0	24
Tom Hancock	21	4	0	0	16
Vaipuna Tia Kilifi	21	2	0	0	8

=== North Queensland Cowboys who played for the Pride in 2016 ===
Cowboys player	Appearances	Tries	Goals	Field goals	Pts
Ben Spina*	21	0	0	0	0
Coen Hess*	6	0	0	0	0
Javid Bowen*	14	10	0	0	40
Patrick Kaufusi*	10	1	0	0	4
Shaun Hudson*	21	4	0	0	16

=== North Queensland Cowboys who played for the Northern Pride in 2015 ===
Cowboys players	2014 Appearances
1	0
2	0
3	0
4	0
5	0
6	0
7	0
8	0

== Televised games ==
=== Channel Nine ===
In August 2012 as part of the historic $1 billion five-year broadcasting agreement with Nine and Fox Sports, the Australian Rugby League Commission confirmed that Intrust Super Cup matches would be televised by Channel 9 until 2018. One match a week is shown live across Queensland at 2.00pm (AEST) on Sunday afternoons on Channel 9 (or GEM), on WIN Television (RTQ) in regional areas and on Imparja Television in remote areas. The match is also broadcast in Papua New Guinea on Kundu 2 TV. The 2015 commentary team is Peter Psaltis, Scott Sattler and Mathew Thompson.

In 2016 the Pride appeared in two televised games:

- Round 1: Northern Pride lost to Sunshine Coast Falcons 25-24 at Sunshine Coast Stadium, Sunshine Coast (Zaidee's Rainbow Foundation Round).
- Round 19: Northern Pride beat Redcliffe Dolphins 20-16 at Barlow Park, Cairns (Indigenous Appreciation Round).
