= Esther (disambiguation) =

Esther is the eponymous heroine of the Book of Esther.

Esther may also refer to:

== People ==
- Esther (given name), a feminine given name
- List of people with given name Esther or Ester
- Esther (surname)

== Places ==
- Esther, Missouri, the former name of Park Hills, Missouri, a city
- Esther, Alberta, an unincorporated community
- Esther, Louisiana, an unincorporated community
- Esther Township, Polk County, Minnesota, a township
- Estherville, Iowa, a city
  - Estherville Township, Emmet County, Iowa
- Esther Mountain
- Esther Park, Kempton Park, a suburb of Kempton Park, Gauteng
- Esther Harbour, a harbor on the coast of King George Island, South Shetland Islands
- Esther Island (Alaska), an island

== Media ==
=== Literature ===
- Book of Esther, one of the books of the Hebrew Bible
- Esther (play), a play by Jean Racine (1689)
- Esther (novel), a novel by Henry Adams (1884)
- Esther, a novel by Rosa Nouchette Carey (c. 1907)
- Esther, a character in the novel Ben-Hur: A Tale of the Christ
- Esther Lyon, a character in the novel Felix Holt, the Radical
- Esther Van Gobseck, a character in the novel Splendeurs et misères des courtisanes

=== Film, TV, and gaming ===
- Esther (1916 film), a silent film
- Esther (1986 film), an Israeli film
- Esther (1999 film), a television film starring Louise Lombard and F. Murray Abraham
- Esther, the lead character from The Book of Esther (2013 film)
- Esther (TV series), a British talk show
- Esther, the main character from the film Orphan (2009) and Orphan: First Kill, the latter of which was previously titled Esther.
- Esther, a character from the video game Dear Esther
- Esther Anderson (Sanford and Son), a character from the television series Sanford and Son
- Esther Blanchett, a major character in the anime Trinity Blood
- Esther Bloom, a character from the soap opera Hollyoaks
- Esther Clavin, a character from the sitcom Cheers
- Esther Drummond, a character from the television programme Torchwood
- Esther Greenwood, the protagonist in Sylvia Plath's semi-autobiographical novel, The Bell Jar
- Esther Hayes, a character from the soap opera Coronation Street
- Esther Samuels, a character from the soap opera Shortland Street
- Esther Valentine, a character from the soap opera The Young and the Restless
- Esther Winchester, an anthropomorphic cowgirl boss character from the video game, Cuphead

=== Music ===
- Esther, an opera by Nicolaus Adam Strungk (1680)
- Esther (Handel), an oratorio by George Frideric Handel (1718)
- Esther (Meyerowitz opera), 1956
- Esther (Weisgall opera), an opera composed by Hugo Weisgall (c. 1993)
- Little Esther (album), a jazz piano album by Horace Parlan
- "Esther", a song by Sara Groves from the album The Other Side of Something
- Esther, the Beautiful Queen, sometimes referred to as Esther, a cantata by William Batchelder Bradbury (1856)
- Esther, a song by American jam band Phish

=== Other media ===
- Esther (Millais painting), an 1865 painting by Millais
- Queen Esther (painting), an 1878 painting by Edwin Long
- Mural called Xola located in Tribeca (Manhattan), inspired by Esther Mahlangu, detailing intricate designs of the Ndebele tribe in South Africa

== Science and technology ==
- Hypagyrtis esther, a species of moth
- Olivella esther, a species of sea snail
- Geckobia estherae, a species of gecko parasite
- Hurricane Esther, a 1961 hurricane that affected the East Coast of the United States
- Tropical Storm Esther (1957)
- Cyclone Esther (1983)
- 622 Esther, a main-belt asteroid
- Esther (C5J), a CPU core used in the low-power VIA C7 CPU

== Other uses ==
- Fast of Esther, a fast observed on Purim eve
- Esther Martinez Native American Languages Preservation Act (2006)
- Lady Esther, a trademark of a cosmetic manufacturing company
- Esther (1794 ship)
- Project Esther, from The Heritage Foundation

== See also ==
- Ester (disambiguation)
- Hadassah (disambiguation)
- Queen Esther (disambiguation)
