= Esther (given name) =

Female given name

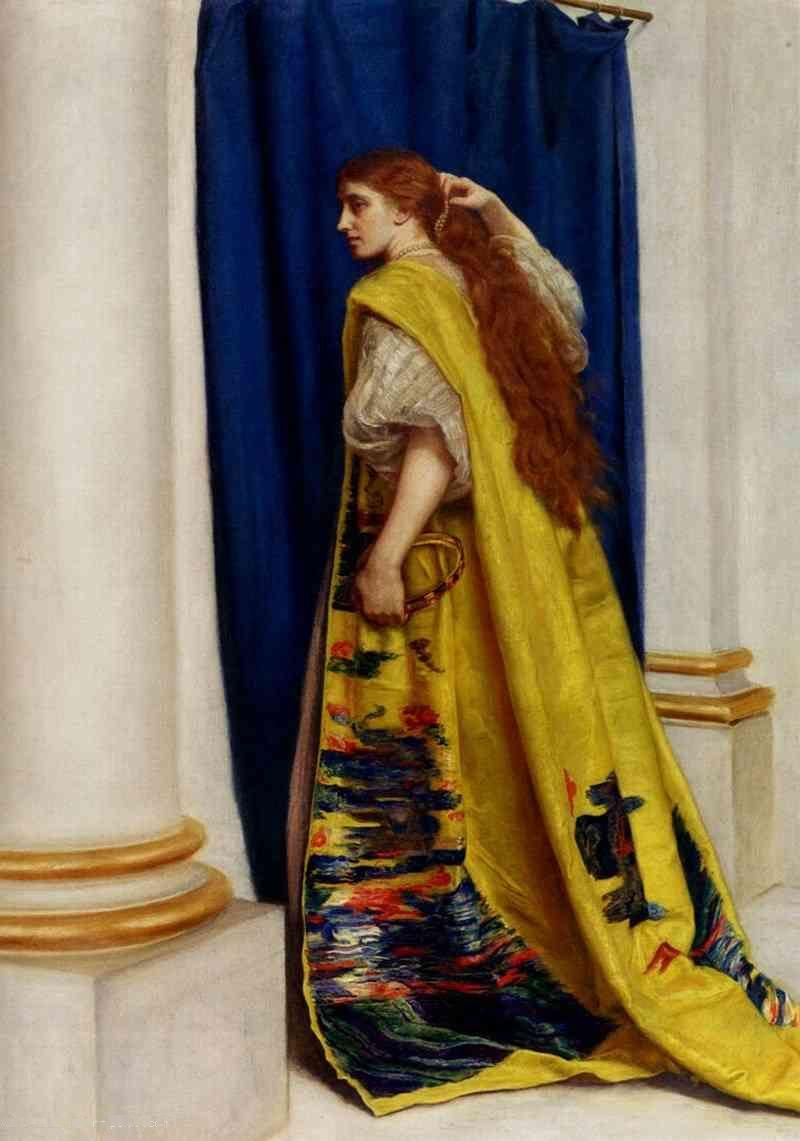
- The Biblical Queen Esther depicted in a portrait by John Everett Millais.
- Gender: Female

Origin
- Origin: Babylonian/Persian
- Meaning: "Star"

Other names
- Related names: Estee, Estella, Estelle, Esti, Estrella, Hadassah, Hester, Stella

Esther is a Persian name meaning star.

According to the Hebrew Bible, queen Esther was born with the name הֲדַסָּה Hadassah ("Myrtle"). Her name was changed to Persian name Esther to hide her identity upon becoming queen of Persia. The three letter root of Esther in Hebrew is s-t-r (סתר), "hide, conceal". The passive infinitive is (לְהִסָּ֫תֶר), "to be hidden".

The name can be derived from the Old Persian stāra (NPer. ستاره setāra, meaning "star") although some scholars identify Esther with the name of the Babylonian goddess of love Ishtar, given its association with the planet Venus (in its role as the Morning Star and the Evening star; see also the Star of Ishtar).

== History of usage ==
The name Esther was in use by the late Second Temple period, though it is only sparsely attested in the surviving historical record. Among the early occurrences is the inscription of Claudia Aster, which appears to preserve a Latinized form of the Hebrew name, borne in this case by a Jerusalem-born woman who was enslaved, probably following the destruction of Jerusalem during the First Jewish Revolt, and later died in southern Italy. Additional parallels, such as Avilia Aster Iudea from Sétif and another inscription from Rome, likewise point to the name's usage among Jews in the diaspora during the Roman period.

Esther first occurs as a given name in Europe and the British Isles at the time of the Reformation prior to which the occurrence of Biblical names – unless borne by saints – was unusual. The modified form, Hester, has seemingly co-existed with the original Esther throughout the name's usage in the English-speaking world, where despite a theoretic slight difference in pronunciation, Esther and Hester were long largely – perhaps totally – interchangeable, with it being routine for a woman cited as Esther in one document to be elsewhere documented as Hester. One example of this is Esther Johnson, the "Stella" of Jonathan Swift, whose baptismal record identifies her as Hester but who always signed herself Esther. Similarly, Swift wrote letters to his "Vanessa": Esther Vanhomrigh, in which Swift sometimes wrote her first name in the respective address as Esther and sometimes as Hester. The interchangeable usage of Esther and Hester had essentially been phased out by 1900, with Esther retaining a high usage (especially in North America), whereas the usage of Hester has shown a progressive decline.

The 9 September 1893 birth of Esther Cleveland, daughter of US president Grover Cleveland, was heavily publicized as the first birth of a presidential child in the White House; the press announcements of her name stated it meant "star". The 1891 birth of Cleveland's first daughter, also Biblically named Ruth, had caused a media sensation and boosted Ruth into the top ten of American girl's names, and while the public endorsement of Esther as the choice of name for Cleveland's second daughter was more muted, Esther did reach its all-time zenith of US popularity soon after Esther Cleveland's birth, being ranked as the #27 most popular name for American girls for the year 1896.

Esther has been a well-used name for baby girls born in New York City. It has also increased in usage along with other Biblical names for babies born during the COVID-19 pandemic by parents seeking comfort in their religious faith.

== International variants ==
- Essi (Finnish)
- Essie (English)
- Esta (English)
- Ester
- Estera
- Εσθήρ (Greek)
- Eszter (Hungarian)
- Ettie (English)
- Etty (English)
- Hester (English)
- אֶסְתֵּר (Esther), the Hebrew and Israeli version of the name. Also Esti and Eti.
- Јестира (Jestira) (Serbian)
- Эсфирь (Esfir, Esphyr) (Russian)
- Eistir (Irish)

== See also ==
- List of people with given name Esther or Ester
- Esther (disambiguation)
- Ester (disambiguation)
- Queen Esther (disambiguation)
