= Ester (disambiguation) =

An ester is a functional group in organic chemistry; specifically a chemical compound derived from an acid in which at least one hydroxyl group is replaced by alkoxy group.

Ester may also refer to:

== Food additives and chemistry ==
- Ester C, ascorbyl palmitate, used as an antioxidant food additive
- Ester gum, or Ester of wood rosin, a food additive used as an emulsifier and stabiliser
- Ester pyrolysis, a vacuum pyrolysis reaction

== Geography ==
- Ester, Alaska, a town
  - Ester Camp Historic District, Alaska
- Ester Mountains in Germany
- Ester (Castro Daire), parish in Castro Daire, Portugal

== People ==
- Variant of Esther (given name)
- List of people with given name Esther or Ester
- Ester (surname)

== Music ==
=== Classical ===
- Ester (Stradella), an Italian oratorio by Alessandro Stradella
- Ester, an Italian oratorio by Carlo Arrigoni Vienna 1737–38
- Ester, an Italian oratorio by Carl Ditters von Dittersdorf
- Ester, a Hebrew-language oratorio by C. G. Lidarti

=== Popular ===
- Ester, an album by Trailer Trash Tracys 2012

== Other uses ==
- Typhoon Ester (disambiguation)

== See also ==
- Esther (disambiguation)
- Eter
- Hadassah (disambiguation)
