= Hessy =

Hessy or Hessie is a given name or nickname. It is the name of:

- Hessie (1936–2017), Cuban-French textile artist
- Hessie Donahue (1874–1961), American matron and stunt boxer
- Hessy Helfman (1855–1882), Russian revolutionary and assassin
- Paul Hester (1959–2005), also known as Hessie, Australian musician and television personality
- Esther Frances How (1848–1915), also known as Hessie How, Canadian schoolteacher
- Hessy Doris Lloyd (1891–1968), English-American actress
- Hessy Levinsons Taft (1934–2026), Jewish child model for Nazi propaganda
- Qatar diplomatic crisis (2017-2021)

== See also ==
- Ezaart, a township in Belgium that includes the former town of Hessie
- Hessey, surname
- Hester, a related name and nickname
