= Ester (surname) =

Ester may be a surname. Notable people with the surname include:

- Laura Ester (1990), Spanish female water polo goalkeeper
- Martin Ester, Canadian-German computer scientist
- Odette Ester (1915–2010), French resistance fighter and anarchist activist
- Pauline Ester, French singer born Sabrina Ocon in 1963
- Peter Ester (1953–2022), Dutch sociologist and politician
- Sofia Ester (born 1978), Portuguese author

== See also ==
- Ester (disambiguation)
- Esther (surname)
