= Castellaro (surname) =

Castellaro is an Italian surname. Notable people with the surname include:

- Juana Castellaro (born 2005), Argentine field hockey player
- Justin Castellaro (born 1990), Italian-Australian rugby league footballer
