= Esther (surname) =

Esther may be a surname. Notable people with the surname include:

- Achille Esther (born 2002), Seychellois footballer
- Colin Esther (born 1989), a Seychellois footballer
- Joy Esther (born 1984) is a French–Spanish actress and singer
- Elizabeth Esther, American Christian author and blogger
- Nodjigoto Tokinon Esther, Chadian football referee
- Frédéric Esther (born 1972), a French boxer

== See also ==
- Esther (disambiguation)
- Ester (surname)
