= Esta (given name) =

Esta is a feminine given name which may refer to:

- Esta Charkham (born 1949), British television and film producer and casting director
- Esta Henry (1883–1963), eccentric Scottish antiques dealer
- Esta Nambayo (born 1968), Ugandan lawyer and judge
- Esther Esta Nesbitt (1918–1975), American illustrator, xerox artist, filmmaker, and educator
- Esta Soler (born 1947), American social activist
- Esta Spalding, American author, screenwriter and poet
- Esta Sterneck, Austrian molecular biologist
- Esta TerBlanche (born 1973), South African actress

== See also ==
- Esther (given name)
