= Etty =

Etty, Ettie or Etti is a feminine given name, often a short version of Esther. It is also a surname. It may refer to the following people:

== Given name ==
- Etti Ankri (born 1963), Israeli singer-songwriter
- Etty Darwin (1843–1927), editor for her father Charles Darwin
- Etty Fraser (1931–2018), Brazilian actress
- Etty Glazer, kidnapped South African woman
- Ettie Mae Greene (1877–1992), an American supercentenarian
- Ettie Grenfell, Baroness Desborough (1867–1952), British society hostess
- Etty Hadiwati Arief (1957–2025), Indonesian author
- Etty Hillesum (1914–1943), Dutch diarist
- Etty Lau Farrell (born 1974), American rock singer
- Etti Plesch (1914–2003), Austrian countess, Hungarian countess, huntress, racehorse owner and socialite
- Ettie Rout (1877–1936), Tasmanian-born New Zealander noted for fighting sexually transmitted diseases among World War I soldiers
- Ettie Steinberg (1914–1942), one of the few Jewish Irish Holocaust victims
- Etty Tantri (born 1975), Indonesian badminton player

== Surname ==
- Eda-Ines Etti (born 1981), Estonian singer
- John Etty (born 1927), English rugby league footballer
- William Etty (1787–1849), English painter
- William Etty (architect) (c. 1675–1734), English architect and craftsman

== See also ==
- Etty Bay, in Queensland, Australia
