= Estera =

Estera is a feminine give name, a form of Esther.

Notable people with the name include:

- Estera or Esterka, mistress of Casimir III the Great
- Estera Dobre, amateur Romanian wrestler
- Suzi Estera Pancenkov or Suzi P, Swedish pop and hip hop singer
- Estera Sheps, birth name of Esther Wertheimer (1926–2016), Canadian sculptor and educator
