= Hester =

Hester is both a female given name and a surname. As a given name Hester is a variant of Esther. In Ireland, particularly County Mayo, the surname Hester is found as an Anglicized form of the Gaelic Ó hOistir descendant of Oistir, who was likely an early 13th century immigrant from Tuscany.

== Given name ==
- Hester Adrian, Baroness Adrian (1899–1966), British mental health worker
- Hester Bateman (bap. 1708–1794), English silversmith
- Hester A. Benedict (1838–1921), American poet and writer
- Hester Biddle (c. 1629–97), English Quaker writer
- Hester "Hetty" Burr (c. 1796–1862), American abolitionist
- Hester Chapone (1727–1801), British author
- Hester A. Davis (1930–2014), American archaeologist
- Hester Dowden (1868–1949), Irish spiritualist medium
- Hester Dunn (born 1940), Northern Irish former loyalist activist and writer
- Hester Maria Elphinstone, Viscountess Keith (1764–1857), British literary correspondent and intellectual
- Hester Goodsell (born 1984), British rower
- Hester Grenville, 1st Countess Temple (c. 1690–1752), English noblewoman
- Hester Jane Haskins (fl. 1860–75), American madam, procuress, and underworld figure
- Hester Kaplan, American author
- Hester Maclean (1859–1932), New Zealand nurse, editor and writer
- Maria Hester Park (1760–1813), British composer, pianist, and singer
- Hester Parnall (1868–1939), English brewer and businesswoman
- Hester Pitt, Countess of Chatham (1720–1803), wife of William Pitt (the Elder), 1st Earl of Chatham, who was Prime Minister of Great Britain from 1766 to 1768
- Lady Hester Pulter (1605–1678), British writer
- Catherine Hester Ralfe (c. 1831–1912), New Zealand dressmaker, teacher, storekeeper, housekeeper and diarist
- Hester Dorsey Richardson (1862–1933), American author
- Hester Santlow (c. 1690–1773), British dancer and actress
- Hester Shaw (midwife) (c. 1580 – 1660), English midwife and pamphleteer
- Lady Hester Stanhope (1776–1839), British socialite, adventurer and traveler
- Hester Thrale (1741–1821), British diarist, author, and patron of the arts
- Hester van Eeghen (1958–2021), Dutch designer
- Hester Veltman-Kamp (born 1973), Dutch politician
- Hester Wagstaff (1892–1953), English illustrator, author and jeweller

== Surname ==
- Bart Hester (born 1977), American politician
- Benny Hester (born 1948), American music artist and songwriter
- Betty Hester (1923–1998), American correspondent
- Carolyn Hester (born 1937), American folk singer and songwriter
- Dave Hester, star of A&E TV's Storage Wars
- Devin Hester (born 1982), American football player
- Drew Hester (born 1969), American percussionist and record producer
- Eric Hester (born 1974), American composer
- Frank Hester (born 1966), British businessman
- Hugh B. Hester (1895–1983), American army officer
- Jack W. Hester (1929–1999), American politician
- Jacob Hester (born 1985), American football player
- James McNaughton Hester (1924–2014), American educator
- Jessie Hester (born 1963), American football player
- Joan Hester (1932–2019), American politician
- John Hester (born 1983), American baseball player
- Joy Hester (1920–1960), Australian artist
- Katie Fry Hester (born 1974), American politician from Maryland
- Laurel Hester (1956–2006), American police officer and advocate of rights of domestic partners
- Leigh Ann Hester (born 1982), American soldier and Silver Star recipient
- Lawrence L. Hester (1891–1973), American politician from South Carolina
- Lex Hester (1935–2000), American public administrator
- Marc Hester (born 1985), Danish professional bicycle racer
- Michael Hester (born 1972), Australian-born New Zealand association football referee
- Paul Hester (1959–2005), Australian musician
- Paul V. Hester (born 1947), American Air Force officer
- Phil Hester (comics) (born 1966), comic book artist and writer
- Phillip Doyce Hester (1955–2013), former chief technology officer of Advanced Micro Devices
- Randolph T. Hester American professor, sociologist, and landscape architect
- Ray Hester (1949–1977), American football player
- Rita Hester (d. 1998), transgender African American murder victim
- Sandra Hester, American activist and former television host
- Stephen Hester (born 1960), CEO of RSA Insurance Group
- Treyvon Hester (born 1992), American football player
- Wallace Hester (1866–1942), British caricaturist for Vanity Fair
- William Hester, also known as Slew Hester (1912–1993), American tennis official

== Fictional characters ==
- Hester Argyle, a character in Agatha Christie's novel Ordeal by Innocence
- Hester Latterly, main character of Anne Perry's Monk detective series
- Hester Prynne, main character of Nathaniel Hawthorne's The Scarlet Letter
- The Character and Death of Mrs. Hester Ann Rogers, a 1794 Methodist tract
- Hester Shaw, a character from Philip Reeve's Mortal Engines Quartet
- Hester Ulrich, a character from the 2015 American horror comedy television series, Scream Queens.
- Hester Crane, mother of Frasier Crane of Cheers and Frasier television shows.
- Hester, the daemon companion of Lee Scoresby in Philip Pullman's His Dark Materials series.
- Hester Sherwood, one of the four characters from the Australian 2002 play Wicked Sisters by Alma De Groen.
- Hester, the daughter of the witch from Hansel and Gretel in School for Good and Evil

== See also ==
- Hessy, a related name and nickname
