= Jan Meyerowitz =

German-American composer and writer (1913–1998)

- Born: Hans-Hermann Meyerowitz; 23 April 1913; Breslau, Germany
- Died: 15 December 1998 (aged 85); Colmar, France
- Occupations: Composer, writer
- Years active: 1951–1998
- Spouse: Marguerite Fricker
- Awards: Guggenheim Fellowship

Jan Meyerowitz (23 April 1913 – 15 December 1998) was a German–American composer and writer.

== Life ==
Meyerowitz was born Hans-Hermann Meyerowitz in Breslau (today Wrocław), the son of a manufacturer. From 1927, he studied in Berlin with Walter Gmeindl and Alexander von Zemlinsky. In 1933, he was forced to leave Germany because he was Jewish and continue his education in Rome with Ottorino Respighi, Alfredo Casella and the conductor Bernardino Molinari. In 1938, he moved to Belgium and in 1939 to the South of France, where he made contact with the French Resistance. His future wife, the singer Marguerite Fricker, helped him in Marseille to survive the Nazi occupation of France.

In 1946 Meyerowitz emigrated to the U.S. and became an assistant to Boris Goldovsky, director of the opera program at Tanglewood. In 1951 he became an American citizen. Meyerowitz taught at Brooklyn College (1956–1962) and at the City College of New York. In 1956 Meyerowitz was awarded the first of two Guggenheim Fellowships. After his retirement, he returned to France where he died in Colmar.

== Selected works ==
=== Compositions ===
==== Stage works ====
- Simoon (1949). Opera in one act. Libretto: Peter John Stephens (after August Strindberg). Premiere 2 August 1949 Tanglewood / Massachusetts
- The Barrier (Die Schranke or The Mulatto, Il Mulatto; 1949). Opera in 2 acts. Libretto: Langston Hughes. Premiere 18 January 1950 New York (Columbia University)
- Emily Dickinson (earlier: Eastward in Eden; 1951). opera in 4 acts. Libretto: Dorothy Gardner. Premiere 16 November 1951 Detroit)
  - 2. acts as separate pieces: The Meeting. Premiere 16. September 1955 Falmouth / Massachusetts
- Bad Boys in School (1952). opera-farce in one act. Libretto: Jan Meyerowitz (after Johann Nestroy). Premiere 17 August 1953 Tanglewood / Massachusetts
- Esther (1957–60). Opera in one act. Libretto: Langston Hughes. Premiere 4 August 1960 Tanglewood / Massachusetts
- Godfather Death (1960/61). Chamber opera in 3 acts. Libretto: Peter John Stephens. Premiere 1 June 1961 New York
- Die Winterballade oder Die Doppelgängerin (1966/67). Opera in 3 acts. Libretto: Jan Meyerowitz (after Gerhart Hauptmann). Premiere 29 January 1967 Staatsoper Hannover; Conductor: Reinhard Petersen

==== Vocal compositions ====
- The Five Foolish Virgins. Cantata
- The Story of Ruth for coloratura and piano
- Missa Rachel Plorans (1954). mass for choir a cappella
- The Glory Around His Head (1955). Easter cantata for middle voices, 4-voice mixed choir and piano. Libretto: Langston Hughes
- How Godly Is the House of God for 4-voice mixed choir and piano. Libretto: Langston Hughes
- Emily Dickinson Cantata. Libretto: Dorothy Gardner
- New Plymouth Cantata for soloist, 4-voice mixed choir and piano. Libretto: Dorothy Gardner
- Hérodiade. Text: Stéphane Mallarmé
- Arvit Shir hadash l'shabbat (Ein neues Lied für den Sabbat). premiere 1962 New York (Park Avenue Synagogue; Cantor: David Putterman)
- Hebrew Service (1962)
- Fünf Geistliche Lieder (1963) for bass and orchestra (2.2.2.2 – 4.2.3.1 – harp – timpani, percussion – strings)
- Other cantatas, songs and song cycles with lyrics E. E. Cummings, Robert Herrick, John Keats, Arthur Rimbaud and others

==== Orchestral works ====
- Midrash Esther (1954). symphony. premiere 1957 New York (New York Philharmonic, Conductor: Dimitri Mitropoulos)
- Flemish Overture (1959) for orchestra (3.3.3.3 – 4.3.3.1 – harp – percussion – strings)
- Oboe Concert (1962; orchestra: 2.0.2.2 – 4.2.2.0 – harp – timpani, percussion – strings)
- Flute Concert
- Four Movements for Wind Symphony (1974)
- Four Romantic Pieces for Concert Band (1978)
- Three Comments on War for concert band (1964)

==== Chamber music ====
- String Quartet (1936–55)
- Sonata for violine and violoncello
- Short Suite for brass (3.3.2.1)

=== Writings ===
- Arnold Schönberg. Berlin (Colloquium) 1967 (Köpfe des 20. Jahrhunderts, vol. 47)
- Der echte jüdische Witz. Berlin (Colloquium) 1971. re-issue: Berlin (arani) 1997. ISBN 3-7605-8669-4
