= Essi =

Essi is a Finnish first name.

Essi is an abbreviation from Persian name Esther, which means star. As of May 2010, the name Essi has been given to 6507 people, one of whom was a man.

== Famous Essis ==
- Essi Hellstén, Suomen Neito -competition winner 2007
- Essi Luttinen, singer
- Essi Pöysti, Miss Finland 2009
- Essi Renvall, sculptor
- Essi Sainio, football player
- Essi Valta, book writer
- Essi Wuorela, singer
- Essi Vanhala, Ringette player
- Essi, Original SoundCloud Artist
