= Elizabeth Esther =

American Christian author and blogger

Elizabeth Esther is an American Christian author and blogger. She writes about her experiences of growing up in, and then leaving, Christian fundamentalism. Esther grew up in a fundamentalist Christian group known as the Assembly. She and her husband left the church after confronting her grandfather, and the founder of the church, about allegations of abuse. She later joined the Catholic Church.

== Work ==
Esther's first book, Girl at the End of the World (2014), is a memoir about her life growing up in The Assembly, which she considered a fundamentalist cult. Lehman, reviewing the book in Feminist Collections, called it a "dramatically chilling tale," which "is told evenly and without melodrama." Stewart, in Library Journal, writes that fans of Esther's blog will already be familiar with much of the book's story, but writes that "This memoir may bring comfort to those who desire to leave their own churches and provides a fascinating glimpse into this understudied sect of Christianity."

Esther's book, Spiritual Sobriety (2016), deals with "religious addiction" and Publishers Weekly wrote that "Those afflicted with similar behaviors and obsessions will find hope in Esther's journey."

Washington Post journalist Sarah Pulliam Bailey described Esther as part of a "recent crop of popular female bloggers willing to push theological boundaries".

== Selected bibliography ==
- Girl at the End of the World: My Escape from Fundamentalism in Search of Faith with a Future, Convergent Books, 2014-03-18. ISBN 978-0307731876
- Spiritual Sobriety: Stumbling Back To Faith When Good Religion Goes Bad, Convergent Books, 2016-04-19, ISBN 978-0307731890
- I'm Kimmy Schmidt, Minus the 'Unbreakable', article by Elizabeth Esther in Christianity Today: http://www.christianitytoday.com/women/2015/march/im-kimmy-schmidt-minus-unbreakable.html
