= Eter =

Eter (Georgian: ეთერ) is a Georgian feminine given name. Notable people with the name include:

- Eter Astemirova (born 1943), Georgian engineer and politician
- Eter Tataraidze (born 1956), Georgian poet folklorist and philologist
