= Ryan Ghietti =

Australian rugby league player (1989–2026)

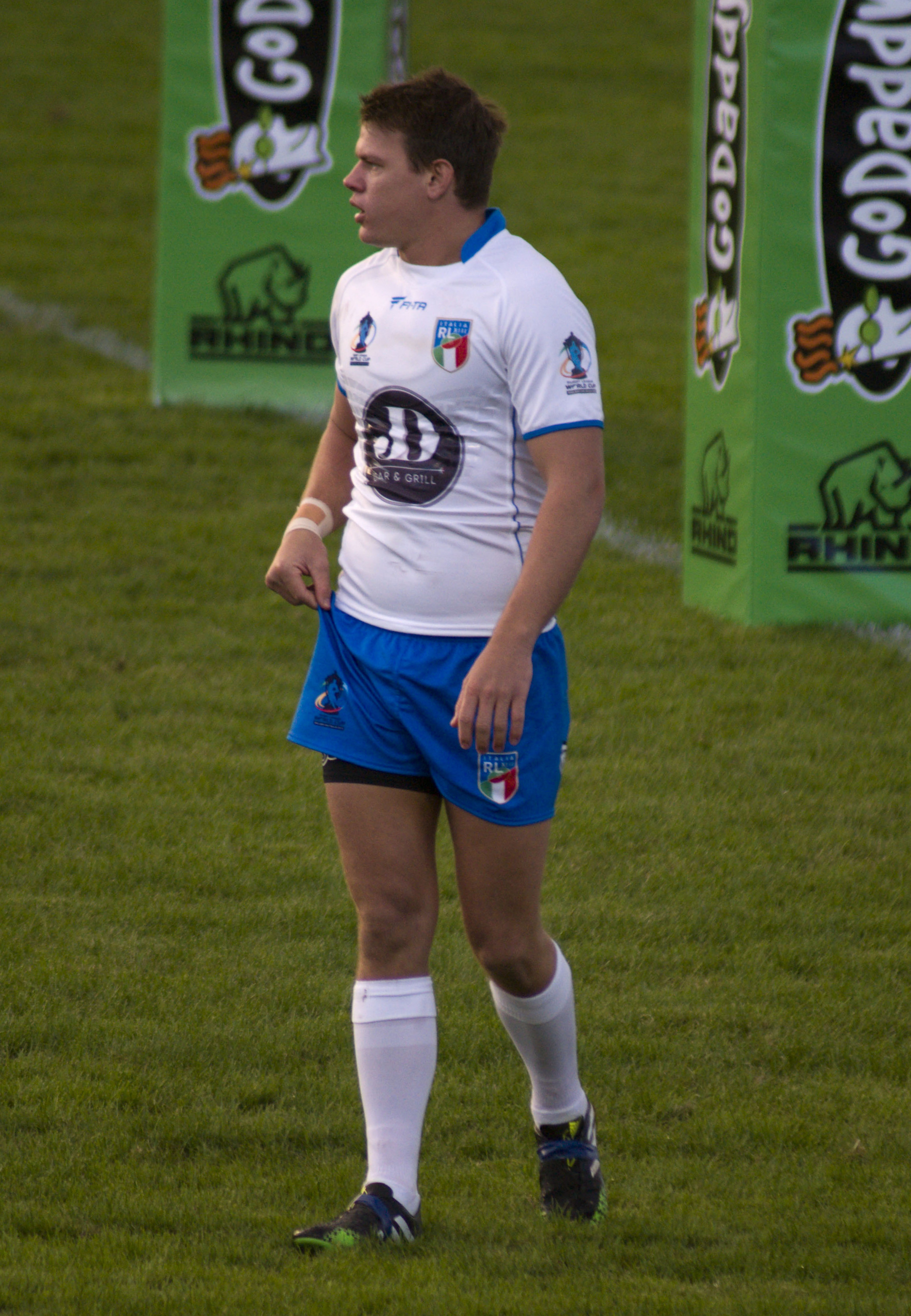
- Ghietti in 2013

Personal information
- Born: 22 July 1989 Innisfail, Queensland, Australia
- Died: 8 November 2026 (aged 37) Victoria, Australia

Playing information
- Height: 180 cm (5 ft 11 in)
- Weight: 89 kg (14 st 0 lb)
- Position: Halfback, Five-eighth, Hooker
Representative
Years	Team	Pld	T	G	FG	P
2011–16	Italy	12	3	0	1	13
- Source: As of 8 October 2017

Ryan Ghietti (22 July 1989 – 8 November 2026) was an Australian rugby league footballer who played in the halves or as a hooker for the Northern Pride in the Queensland Cup. Born in Australia, Ghietti represented the Italian national team, most notably as a member of their 2013 and 2017 World Cup squads.

== Early life ==
Ghietti was born in Innisfail, Queensland, Australia, on 22 July 1989.

He played junior rugby league for the Innisfail Brothers. He was of Italian descent.

== Playing career ==
Ghietti represented Italy in the 2013 World Cup qualifying tournament in 2011, the 2013 World Cup, and the 2017 World Cup qualifying tournament in 2016. He was named captain of the Northern Pride for the 2016 season.

He played for the Redcliffe Dolphins in 2009 and then joined the Northern Pride in 2011.

== Personal life and death ==
Ghietti's father, Les, died from cancer in March 2015.

Ghietti died on 8 November 2026, at the age of 37, from a medical event while holidaying in Victoria.
