= Richard Pandia =

PNG international rugby league footballer

Personal information
- Born: 27 April 1994 (age 31) Papua New Guinea
- Height: 176 cm (5 ft 9 1/2 in)
- Weight: 84 kg (13 st 3 lb; 185 lb)

Playing information
- Position: Fullback, Wing, Centre
Representative
Years	Team	Pld	T	G	FG	P
2017	Papua New Guinea	1	0	0	0	0
- Source: As of 26 February 2026

Richard Pandia (born 4 May 1994) is a Papua New Guinean professional rugby league footballer playing for the Ipswich Jets rugby league club and he is the younger brother of team mate and former PNG Kumuls Sebastian Pandia, and is currently the second highest try-scorer in the Intrust Super Cup. He was in the Papua New Guinea Kumuls team that played the Cook Islands at Campbelltown, Sydney on 6 May 2017.

Pandia earned his Bachelor of Business degree from Griffith University.
