= Hessey =

Hessey is a surname. Notable people with the surname include:

- James Hessey (1814–1892), British cleric and headmaster
- James Hessey (publisher) (1785–1870), English publisher
- Sean Hessey (born 1978), English football player and manager

== See also ==
- Ron Hassey (born 1953), American baseball player
