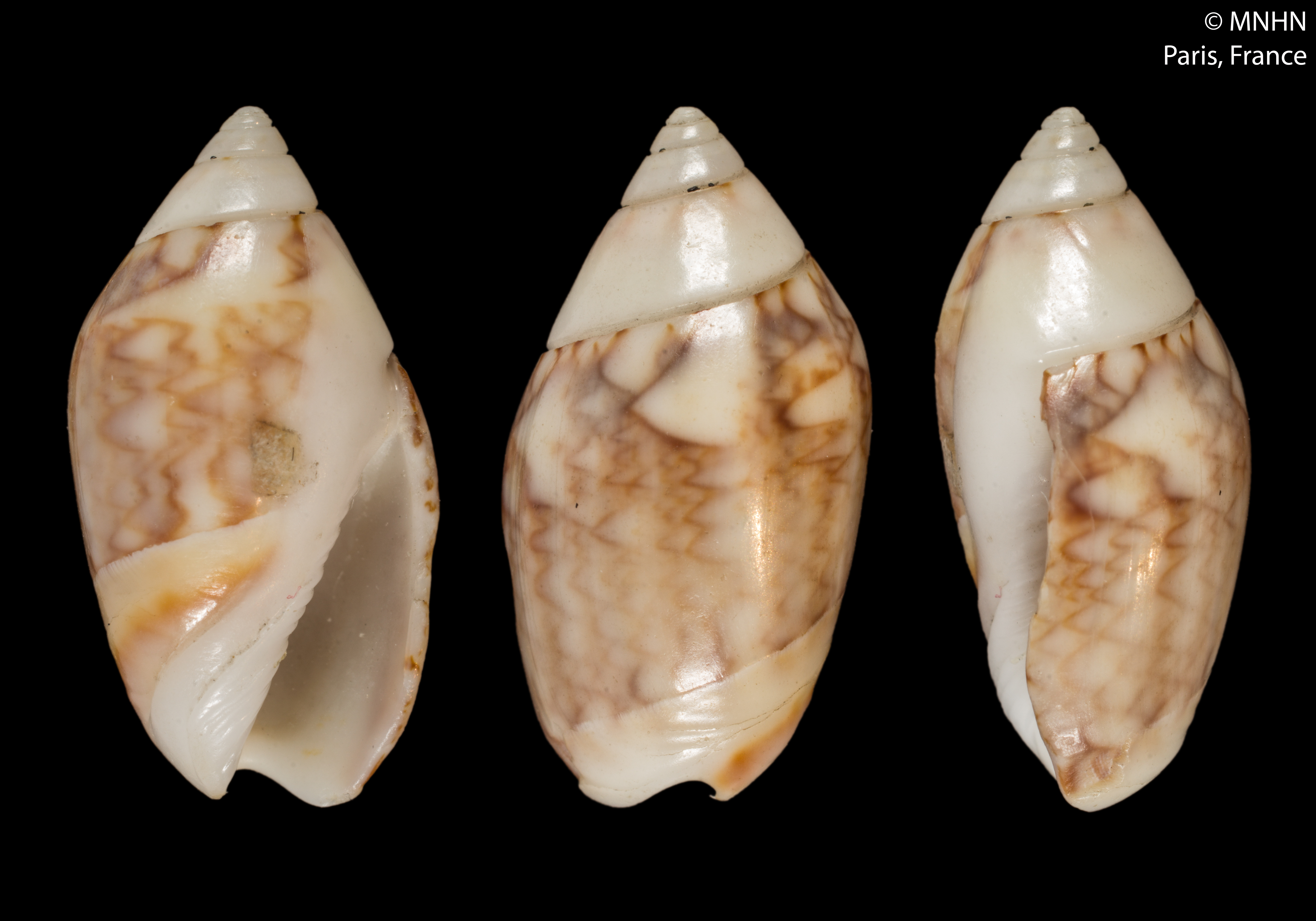
- Shell of Olivella esther (syntype at MNHN, Paris)

Scientific classification
- Kingdom: Animalia
- Phylum: Mollusca
- Class: Gastropoda
- Subclass: Caenogastropoda
- Order: Neogastropoda
- Family: Olividae
- Genus: Olivella
- Species: O. esther

Binomial name
- Olivella esther (Duclos, 1835)

Synonyms
- Oliva columba Duclos, 1835; Oliva esther Duclos, 1835 (original combination); Olivella columba (Duclos, 1835)

= Olivella esther =

Species of gastropod

Olivella esther is a species of small sea snail, marine gastropod mollusk in the subfamily Olivellinae, in the family Olividae, the olives. Species in the genus Olivella are commonly called dwarf olives.

== Description ==
The shell has a maximum length of 16mm and a maximum width of 7mm. The color is often a yellowish off white base with brown markings and a brown band.
