= Sheldon Powe-Hobbs =

Scotland international rugby league footballer

Personal information
- Born: 2 January 1992 (age 34) Cairns, Queensland, Australia
- Height: 189 cm (6 ft 2 in)
- Weight: 100 kg (15 st 10 lb)

Playing information
- Position: Prop, Second-row
Club
Years	Team	Pld	T	G	FG	P
	Northern Pride
Representative
Years	Team	Pld	T	G	FG	P
2016	Scotland	1	0	0	0	0
- Source: As of 28 October 2016

Sheldon Powe-Hobbs (born 2 January 1992) is a Scotland international rugby league footballer who plays as a prop or second-row for the Northern Pride club in the Queensland Cup.

== Background ==
Powe-Hobbs was born in Cairns, Queensland, Australia.

== Playing career ==
Powe-Hobbs is a Scotland international. He made his representative début for Scotland against Australia in the opening match of the 2016 Rugby League Four Nations.
