= Esta Sterneck =

Austrian molecular biologist

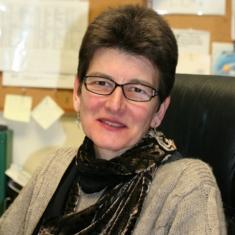
- Born: G. Esta Sterneck
- Education: Heidelberg University (PhD)
- Scientific career
- Fields: Molecular biology, cancer research
- Workplaces: National Cancer Institute
- Thesis: Mechanismus der Aktivierung von cMGF-Produktion durch Kinasen in Transformierten Myeloiden Zellen (1991)

Esta Sterneck is an Austrian molecular biologist researching the functions of the C/EBPδ][CEBPD transcription factor as tumor suppressor as well as tumor promoter in breast epithelial cells and cells of the tumor microenvironment. She is a senior investigator and head of the molecular mechanisms in development section at the National Cancer Institute.

== Education ==
Esta Sterneck trained at the European Molecular Biology Laboratory and the Center for Molecular Biology Heidelberg University before completing a Ph.D. at Heidelberg University. Her thesis work investigated oncogene cooperation in leukemia cells and revealed their coordinate induction of an essential autocrine growth factor. Her 1991 thesis was titled, Mechanismus der Aktivierung von cMGF-Produktion durch Kinasen in Transformierten Myeloiden Zellen.

During her postdoctoral training at the Advanced BioScience Laboratories-Basic Research Program in Frederick, Maryland. Sterneck began to study the functions of CCAAT-enhancer-binding proteins (C/EBP) transcription factors, including their roles in normal mammary gland development, through genetically engineered mice.

== Career and research ==
Sterneck began her independent research with an NCI-Scholar grant before being recruited as a principal investigator to the National Cancer Institute (NCI) in 2003. She is a senior investigator and head of the molecular mechanisms in development section.

Sterneck's research investigates signaling pathways with emphasis on pro-inflammatory molecules in breast epithelial cells and cells of the tumor microenvironment. She studies cell signaling pathways that regulate mammary gland development and tumorigenesis.

== Awards and honors ==
In 2013, Sterneck received the NIH Merit Award and the NCI Outstanding Mentor Award.
