= Ester (Castro Daire) =

- Civil parish
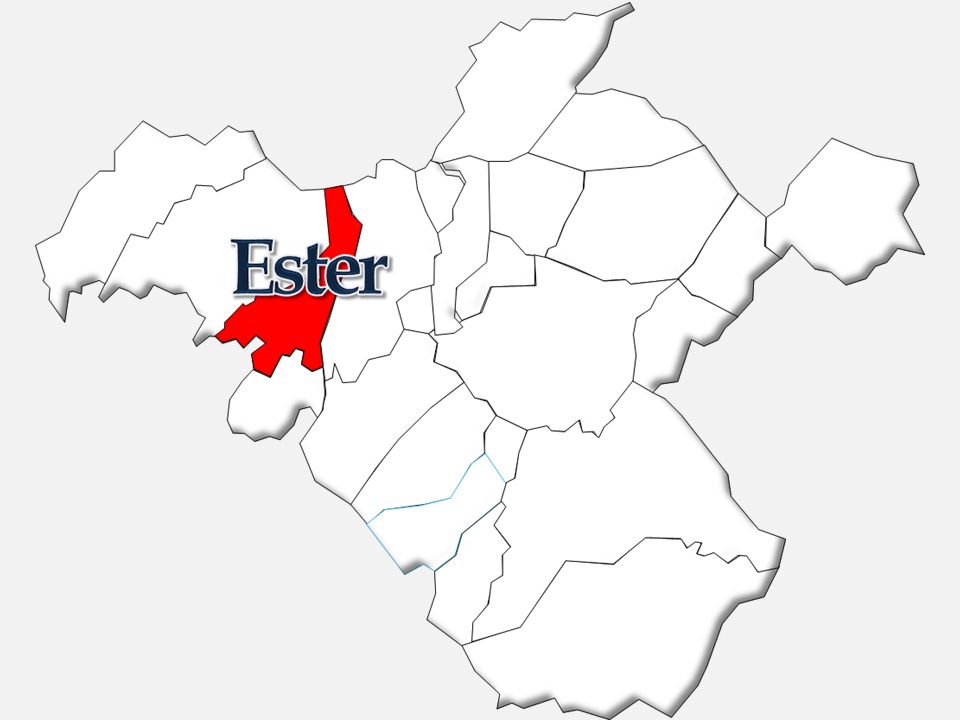
- Coordinates: 40°54′55″N 8°1′29″W
- Country: Portugal
- Region: Centro
- Intermunic. comm.: Viseu Dão Lafões
- District: Viseu
- Municipality: Castro Daire
- Disbanded: 2013

Area
  - Total: 11.5 km^{2} (4.4 sq mi)

Population (2011)
  - Total: 220
  - Density: 19/km^{2} (50/sq mi)
- Time zone: UTC+00:00 (WET)
  - Summer (DST): UTC+01:00 (WEST)
- Patron: Saint Peter

Ester is a former civil parish in the municipality of Castro Daire in the district of Viseu, Portugal. In 2013, the parish merged into the new parish Parada de Ester e Ester. It has 11.5 km^{2} and had 220 inhabitants in the 2011 census.
