= Odette Kervorcʻh =

- Born: 15 July 1915; Bouguenais
- Died: 11 March 2010 (aged 94); La Chapelle-sur-Erdre

Odette Kervorc’h (1915–2010), also known as Odette Ester, was a French resistance fighter and anarchist activist. During World War II, she joined the Vengeance network. After the end of the Nazi occupation, she became involved in the relief association for Spanish deportees in the USSR and in Confédération nationale du travail (CNT), the main French anarchist union.

== Biography ==
Odette Lucienne Marie Kervorc’h, of Breton origin, was born in Bouguenais on 15 July 1915. From a very young age, she became an anti-clerical, anarchist, and feminist, opposing the traditional roles assigned to women in her society. She had a daughter with a trade unionist named Jean-Marie Beilvert, who was then her husband, but she later divorced and moved to Paris.

During World War II, she joined the Vengeance network, "[rejecting] all patriotic rhetoric". She later met another anarchist resistance fighter, Josep Ester Borras, a deportee to Mauthausen, whom she married. Together, they significantly organized the activities of the Spanish Federation of Deportees and Political Internees (FEDIP), of which Borras was one of the founders. The organization aimed to provide support to anti-Stalinist Spanish deportees in the USSR, including socialists, anarchists, and trotskyists. During a campaign organized in 1947 for the FEDIP, she met Georges Altman and became his assistant at the Franc-Tireur newspaper.

She was elected to the editorial board of Combat syndicaliste, where she published several articles. Additionally, Kervorc’h was involved in activities supporting clandestine individuals, particularly anarchists going into hiding.

Kervorc’h left Paris after Borras retired, and in 1974, they moved together to Saint-Christol-lès-Alès in the Gard. There, she became a member of the Cremation Society.

She died in La Chapelle-sur-Erdre on 11 March 2010.
