= Esther (Meyerowitz opera) =

Opera by Jan Meyerowitz

Esther is a 1956 English-language opera by Jan Meyerowitz to a libretto by Langston Hughes based on the biblical story in the Book of Esther. The opera was premiered at the Festival of Contemporary Arts at the University of Illinois at Urbana–Champaign.
