= Hessie Donahue =

American matron and stunt boxer

Hessie Donahue (1874–1961) was an American matron and stunt boxer, the first person to knock out John L. Sullivan.

She married Charles Converse, owner of a boxing school in Worcester, Massachusetts.

In 1892, Converse was invited to join Sullivan in an exhibition tour of theatres. Donahue went along and was asked to spar with Sullivan in a vaudeville act. The idea was that when the champion had dealt with all comers, he would announce that he had been challenged by a woman.

With the crowd buzzing, Donahue would step into the ring, wearing a blouse, bloomers and boxing gloves. She would then spar with Sullivan until the curtain came down.

But one night in Arkansas, this act got out of hand. Sullivan accidentally punched Donahue in the face and she countered with a full right to his jaw that dropped him unconscious to the floor for a full minute. The crowd loved it and the punch was kept as part of the act.

In 1956, she appeared on I've Got a Secret, where she won when the panelists failed to guess the secret. She was also crowned Boston's May Queen in that year.

== Personal life ==
Donahue was married and widowed four times.

She died in 1961.
