= Esfir =

Esfir or Esphyr (Russian: Эсфирь is a Russian-language feminine given name, a form of the given name Esther. Notable people with the name include:

- Esfir Buranova, Soviet writer, screenwriter, playwright, and journalist
- Esfir Dolzhenko, birth name of Svetlana Krachevskaya (born 1944), Soviet athlete
- Esfir Shub (1894–1959), Soviet filmmaker
- Esphyr Slobodkina, Russian-born American artist, author, and illustrator
- Esfir Tobak (1908–2004), Soviet film editor
