= Sofia Ester =

Portuguese writer

Sofia Ester was born in 1978 in Lisbon. Her first book, Adozinda, was published in 1995. Sofia Ester finished writing this book in 1993. The book Adozinda is about the adventures of a sixteen-year-old sorceress who lives in Portugal, in the present time. Because, most of the time, her parents work abroad, Adozinda is alone at home. She has to cope with teenagers’ everyday problems, and try to solve them has best has she can.

== Written works ==
Ester wrote two more books about Adozinda:

- Adozinda e Zulmiro – A magia da adolescência
- Adozinda – A Faculdade de Ciências Ocultas

Ester also wrote the book Carta de Amor a Luís de Camões.

== Sources ==
- António Garcia Barreto, Dicionário de Literatura Infantil Portuguesa, page 185, Campo das Letras, ISBN 972-610-333-9.
