= Queen Esther =

Queen Esther may refer to:

- Esther, a biblical character
  - Queen Esther (painting), an 1878 portrait of Esther by Edwin Long
- Esther Montour (c. 1720–?), Iroquois woman of northeastern Pennsylvania
- Queen Esther Marrow (born 1941), American soul and gospel singer
- Queen Esther (artist), American musician, performer, writer and vocalist
- Queen Esther, a 2025 novel by John Irving
