= Etty Bay =

Bay in Queensland, Australia

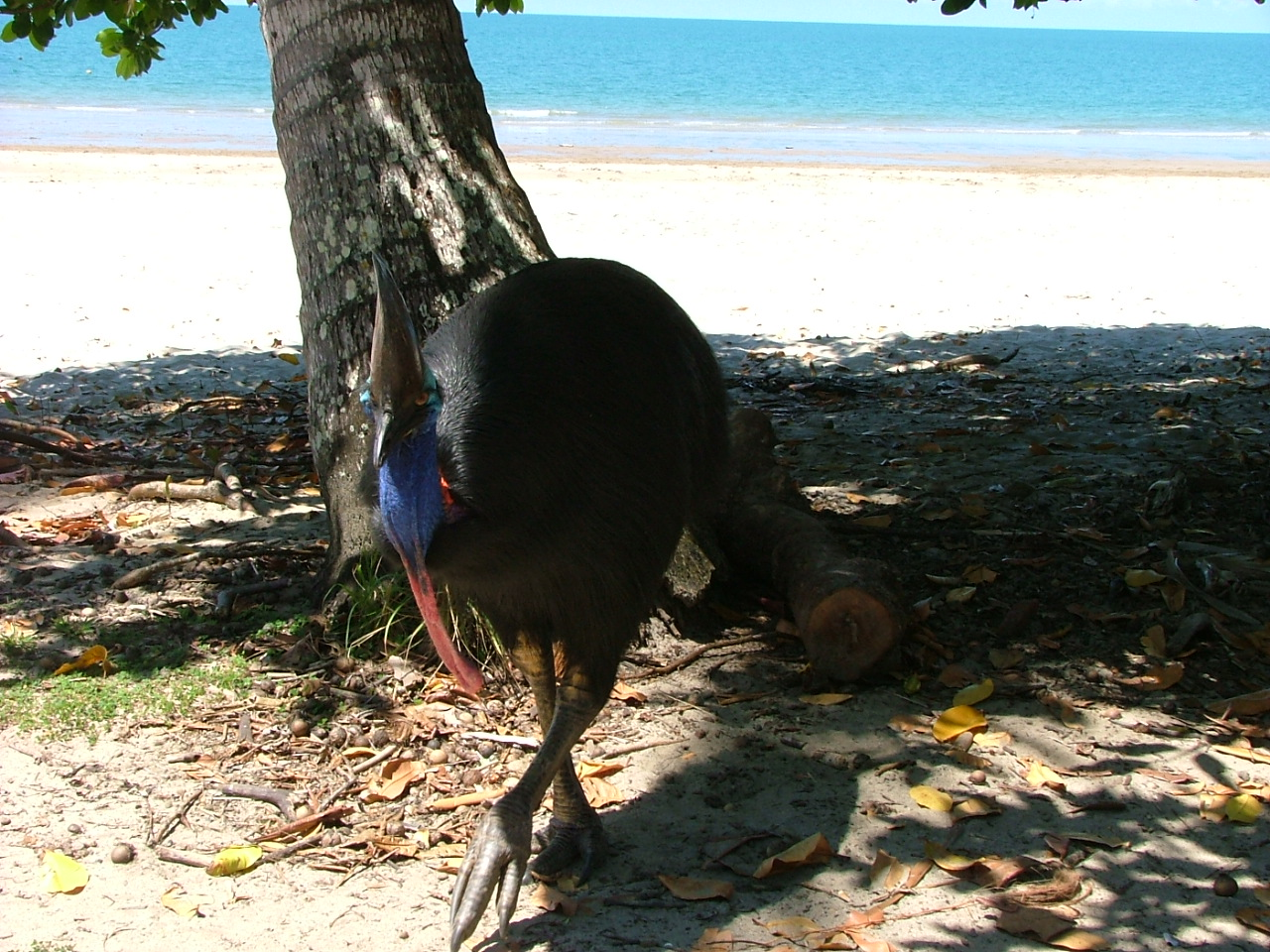
- Australia's largest flightless bird, the cassowary, on the beach at Etty Bay

- Location within Queensland
- Coordinates: 17°33′28.05″S 146°5′25.31″E
- Ocean/sea sources: Pacific Ocean
- Basin countries: Australia

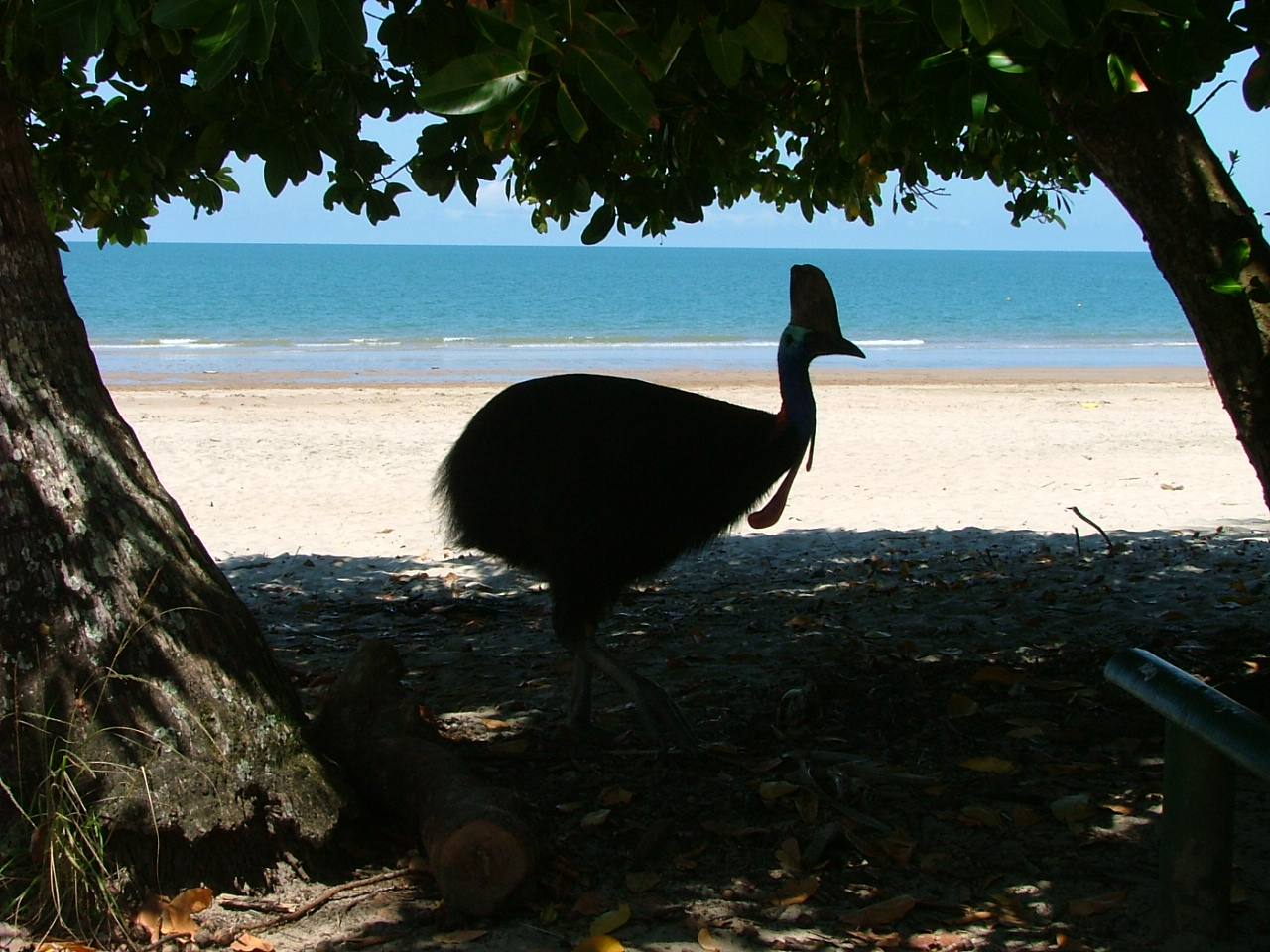
Bird in the shadows

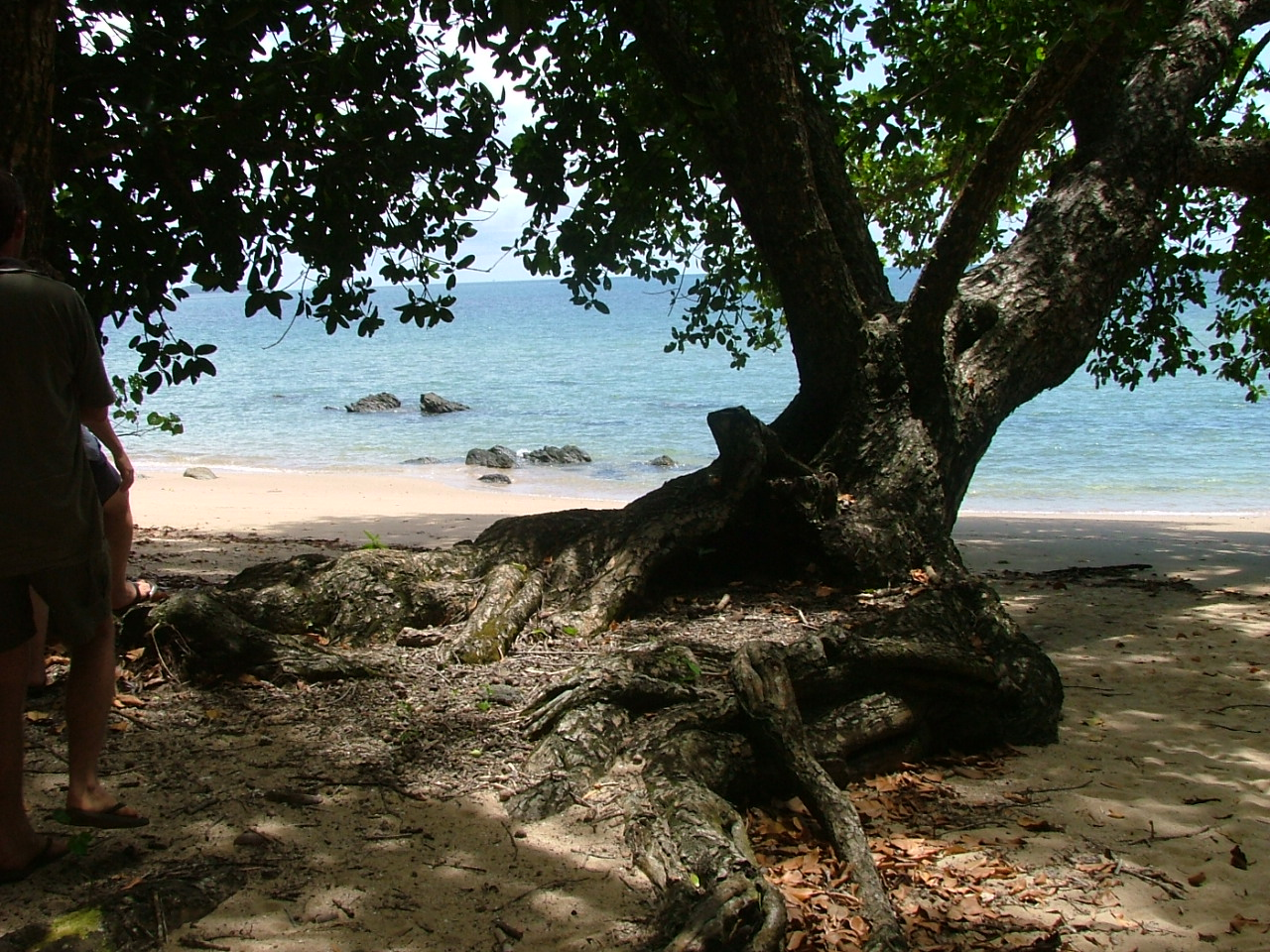
Picnic spot in the shade

Etty Bay is a relatively sheltered bay in Far North Queensland with a 700 metres (2,300 ft) long beach in the far north of the Australian state of Queensland. The beach is 15 kilometres (9.3 mi) by road from the township of Innisfail, 20 minutes drive from Paronella Park and 7 kilometres (4.3 mi) from the Bruce Highway. The final kilometre of the route is a scenic drive climbing 100 metres (330 ft) over the Moresby Range before descending into a picturesque bay. The Bay has a Surf Lifesaving Club and a small caravan park.

== Beach ==
The beach is a popular recreational area for surfing, swimming, sailing, boating and fishing. Etty Bay is known as one of North Queensland's most scenic beaches. The caravan park is on the beachfront and serves meals. The bay has sufficient amenities for day visitors. There are shaded picnic spots with electric BBQs on and near the beach. The Etty Bay beach is enclosed by rainforest that has a wide variety of wildlife and is suited to bushwalking.

The beach is backed by a narrow tree shaded reserve, then to a steep forested slope rising up to 250 metres (270 yd) behind the beach. The Surf Lifesaving Club, shop and toilets sit behind the middle of the beach. The beach is fine grain white sand. At high tide it is less than 50 metres (55 yd) wide and at low tide over 100 metres (110 yd) is exposed. Waves average 0.5 metres (1.6 ft) and spill across a shallow bar. There are rocks on either end of the beach. A stinger net is located in front of the Surf Lifesaving Club.

== Wildlife ==
Etty Bay is known as the bay where you can see the endangered cassowary walking on the beach. The southern cassowary and chicks frequent the beach, wet tropic rainforest and caravan park. They are Australia's largest flightless bird and can be dangerous. Saltwater crocodiles are sometimes seen in the waters near the bay. Monitor lizards are also sometimes seen.

== Swimming ==
The Surf Lifesaving Club was founded in 1935. The beach has a stinger net installed for safe swimming during the stinger season from November through to May. This is a relatively safe beach with a usually shallow surf. Sometimes strong breezes build bigger waves which increase the surf and can produce a rip. It is best to stay in the centre of the beach in the stinger net area. The potential hazards are crocodiles, Box Jellyfish and the deadly Irukandji jellyfish.

== Fishing ==
Owing to the low beach slope it is best to fish at high tide and from the rocks at either end of the bay. Fish caught are barramundi, coral trout, mackerel, swallow-tail dart, flathead, bream, mangrove jack, whiting, small sharks and rays. Soft plastic and popper lures yield big fish, but bait such as squid and prawn also provide good results.
