= Justin Castellaro =

Australian rugby league footballer (born 1990)

Personal information
- Born: 7 September 1990 (age 34); Ingham, Queensland, Australia

Playing information
- Height: 188 cm (6 ft 2 in)
- Weight: 92 kg (14 st 7 lb)
- Position: Wing, Centre
Representative
| Years | Team | Pld | T | G | FG | P |
|---|---|---|---|---|---|---|
| 2016–17 | Italy | 5 | 4 | 0 | 0 | 16 |

Justin Castellaro (born 7 September 1990) is an Australian rugby league footballer who represented Italy at the 2017 World Cup. He played for the Northern Pride in the Intrust Super Cup. He primarily played on the wing or centre.

== Background ==
Castellaro was born in Ingham, Queensland, Australia. He is of Italian descent.

Castellaro played his junior rugby league for the Herbert River Crushers.

== Playing career ==
In 2012, Castellaro joined the Northern Pride from the Herbert River Crushers. In 2014, he scored a hat-trick in the opening match of the season, but suffered an ACL injury in July that caused him to miss the rest of the year. He was named vice-captain of their Intrust Super Cup side in 2017. Castellaro retired after the 2018 season.

=== International ===
In 2016, he represented Italy in the 2017 Rugby League World Cup qualifiers. He played three games, scoring three tries, which included two against Russia in the European play-off game.

In 2017, he was named in Italy's 2017 Rugby League World Cup squad. Castellaro scored Italy's first try in their 36-12 loss to Ireland and played in their 46-0 win against the United States.
