= Hadassah =

Hadassah (Hebrew: הֲדַסָּה) means myrtle. It is given as the Hebrew name of Esther in the Book of Esther.

Hadassah may also refer to:

- Hadassah (dancer) (1909–1992), Jerusalem-born American dancer and choreographer
- Hadassah Froman, Israeli peace activist
- Hadassah Lieberman (born 1948), wife of US Senator Joe Lieberman
- Hadassah Rosensaft (1912–1997), Polish Holocaust survivor
- Hadassah Women's Zionist Organization of America, a United States Jewish women's organization
  - Hadassah Magazine, a magazine published by Hadassah
  - Hadassah Medical Center, a medical center in Israel funded by Hadassah
- Hadassah (typeface) or Hadassah Friedlaender, a typeface for Hebrew
- Hadassah: One Night with the King, a novel based upon the Biblical Book of Esther

== See also ==
- Book of Esther
- Hadass
