= 2015 Northern Pride RLFC season =

Coordinates: 16°55′49″S 145°46′2″E

Northern Pride
Club information
- Full name: Northern Pride Rugby League Football Club
- Nickname: The Pride
- Colours: Black, teal and gold
- Founded: 2007
- Website: northernpride.com.au

Current details
- Ground: Barlow Park, Cairns (seating 1,700, standing 15,000)
- CEO: Rod Jensen (2015–2016)
- Coach: Joe O'Callaghan (2015–2016)
- Captain: Brett Anderson & Jason Roos (2014–2015)
- Competition: Intrust Super Cup
- 2015: 6th
Home colours

Away colours

Records
- Premierships: 2 (2010, 2014)
- Runners-up: 1 (2009)
- Minor premierships: 3 (2013, 2014, 2024)

2015 was the eighth competitive season for the Cairns based Sea Swift Northern Pride Rugby League Football Club. They were one of 14 clubs that played in the twentieth season of Queensland's top rugby league competition, QRL's Intrust Super Cup, with each team playing 11 home games and 12 away games over 25 weeks between March and August.

This season the competition expanded to 14 teams with the inclusion of the Townsville Blackhawks. The Blackhawks became the third feeder club to the North Queensland Cowboys, sharing the Cowboy's player allocation with the Pride and Mackay Cutters.

The Pride appointed a new coach after Jason Demetriou moved to the Cowboys. Demetriou had signed a two-year extension with the Pride, making him one of the highest paid coaches in the Intrust Cup, but he decided to take the role in Townsville working with David Furner and John Cartwright as assistant coaches under Paul Green. Pride assistant coach Joe O'Callaghan was promoted to head coach. O'Callaghan had been coach to numerous Academy sides, including the U-20s Central Comets (2007–2008), U-20s Tweed Heads Seagulls (2009), and U-20s Easts Tigers (2012), and had been the Pride's assistant coach for two seasons.

Former Pride player Rod Jensen was appointed Chief Executive, replacing Brock Schaefer who left to take up a senior administrative role at NRL premiers South Sydney. 'Rocket' Rod had previously played wing and centre for the Adelaide Rams, Canberra Raiders and North Queensland Cowboys in the NRL Telstra Premiership, and for the Huddersfield Giants in the English Super League. He joined the Pride in their second season in 2009, and although he retired at the end of the year, he changed his mind and rejoined the club again halfway through the 2010 season, scoring a try in the 2010 Grand Final. Jensen played for the Pride for two more season, before moving to the CDRL Mareeba Gladiators.

The Pride defended their 2014 premiership under new coach Joe O'Callaghan. The team suffered substantial player losses as a result of their successful 2014 season with four players contracted to the NRL Telstra Premiership, two of the North Queensland Cowboys allocated players moving to the Townsville Blackhawks, and Joel Riethmuller retiring.

The club arranged some high-profile trial matches, beating newcomers Townsville Blackhawks, before travelling to Sydney to meet the 2014 NRL Telstra Premiers, South Sydney in the Return to Redfern annual match. Although the Rabbitohs rested some of their star players, the Pride held them to a 20-all draw. The following week the Rabbitohs travelled to England for the World Club Challenge where they beat Super League premiers St Helens R.F.C. 39-0. The Pride returned home to play against QCup heavyweights PNG Hunters. This trail was arranged at the last minute and was something of a consolation for the Pride, who were not scheduled to play the Hunters at home this season. Last year's home game against the Hunters attracted a record crowd, earning the club around $50,000 in gate receipts and sponsorship.

In the regular season the Pride got off to a poor start, losing the first four rounds. Round 1 was a grand final rematch against Easts Tigers, with the Tigers coming out victorious this time. Round 2 was cancelled due to Cyclone Nathan. Round 3 was against newcomers, the Blackhawks, who the Pride had beaten in a pre-season trial. The Blackhawks came to Cairns with three Cowboys players who had played for the Pride last year, and Dan Beasley, who had signed to play for the Pride, then reneged and showed up as the Blackhawks captain. The Blackhawks won 52-10, the Pride's biggest ever home loss and third biggest defeat of all time.

The Pride went on to win 14 games, climbing into the top eight by Round 9. They finished in sixth place, but were eliminated in the first week of the finals, losing 26–54 to the Ipswich Jets, who would go on to win the Grand Final against the new Townsville side.

== 2015 Season - Sea Swift Northern Pride ==
- Competition: Intrust Super Cup
- Sponsor: Sea Swift

=== Staff ===
==== Coaches/Trainers ====
- Coach: Joe O'Callaghan.
- Assistant coach: Shane O'Flanagan
- Mal Meninga Cup U-18s coach: Dave Scott
- Cyril Connell Cup U-16s coach:
- Trainer: Peter Nash
- Assistant trainer: Deb Gallop.
- Physiotherapist: Tim Laycock
- Head conditioner and high performance manager: Ben Fielding
- Strength and rehab coordinator: Matthew Di Salvo
- Assistant strength and rehab coordinator: Megan Harding

==== Captains ====
- Co-Captains: Brett Anderson & Jason Roos.
- Vice-Captain: Ben Jeffries
- Sheldon Powe-Hobbs (c) (Pre-season trial)
- Jordan Biondi-Odo (c) (Pre-season trial)
- Senior leadership group: Brett Anderson, Jason Roos, Alex Starmer, Ryan Ghietti, Sam Obst.

==== Managers ====
- Team manager: Alan Marsh
- Administration Manager: Kerri Neil
- Mascot: Barlow the Lion (Peter Spooner)
- Chief executive: Rod Jensen
- Senior consultant: Denis Keeffe
- Chairman: Bob Fowler
- Board of Directors: Tony Williamson (sponsorship), John Moore, Rob White (football), Stephen Tillett (community), Fred White (government), Anthony Mirotsos (legal), Gail Andrejic (finance).

== 2015 squad ==
The Pride used 32 players this season. Sixteen players from last year signed with the club again, and four of the Cowboys' allocation players from last season were assigned to the Pride again this year. Twelve new players made their debut this season; eleven were new signings (Bradley Stephen, Codey Kennedy, David Murphy, Dean Mcgilvray, Denzel King, Graham Clark, Keelan White, Luke George, Nathan Wales, Regan Verney and Vaipuna Tia-Kilifi), and one was a new Cowboys allocation player (Lachlan Coote*). Hezron Murgha signed to the Cowboys, but was allocated to the Pride and made 19 appearances in QCup this season.

Brett Anderson (co-captain)
Jason Roos (co-captain)
Alex Starmer
Bradley Stephen
Brent Oosen
Codey Kennedy
David Murphy
Dean McGilvray
Denzel King
Graham Clark
Jack Svendsen
Jordan Biondi-Odo
Justin Castellaro

Keelan White
Linc Port
Luke George
Nathan Wales
PJ Webb
Patrick Kaufusi
Regan Verney
Ryan Ghietti
Sam Obst
Semi Tadulala
Sheldon Powe-Hobbs
Tom Hancock
Vaipuna Tia Kilifi

Trial

Eddie Daniel
Jared Allen
Jared Verney
Menmuny Murgha
Maddie Oosen
Sam Pau
Travis Peeters
Broski Emery Hunia (Cairns Brothers)
Lachlan Parmenter (Cairns Brothers)
Peter Tognolini (Cairns Brothers)
Nathan Curcio (Atherton Roosters)
Jayden Gil
Joseph Forrester
Josh Mene
Jamie Kerwick

North Queensland Cowboys allocation

Ben Spina*
Cameron King*
Hezron Murgha*
Javid Bowen*
Lachlan Coote*
Scott Bolton*

Trial match:
James Tamou

Allocated but did not play for the Pride in 2015:
Antonio Winterstein
Kyle McConnell

Allocated to Pride but played for the Blackhawks:
Dan Beasley

=== 2015 player gains ===
Player	From League	From Club	Notes
Luke George	English RL Super League	Bradford Bulls	
Vaipuna Tia-Kilifi	NRL Telstra Premiership	Penrith Panthers	
Denzel King	NRL Under-20s	Canterbury Bulldogs	
David Murphy	NRL Under-20s	Canterbury Bulldogs	
Sam Pau	NRL Under-20s	North Queensland Cowboys	
Graham Clark	Intrust Super Cup	Wynnum Manly Seagulls	
Regan Verney	CDRL	Tully Tigers	
Jared Verney	CDRL	Tully Tigers	
Dean McGilvray	CDRL	Atherton Roosters	
Eddie Daniel	CDRL	Cairns Brothers	
Bradley Stephen	CDRL	Cairns Kangaroos	
Travis Peeters	CDRL	Cairns Kangaroos	
Nathan Wales	CDRL	Edmonton Storm	
Codey Kennedy	CDRL	Ivanhoes Knioghts	
Patrick Kaufusi	NRL Telstra Premiership	North Queensland Cowboys	
Ben Jeffries	English RL Super League	Bradford Bulls	Played trial matches, but then left the Pride before the regular season.

=== Player losses after 2014 season ===
The Pride suffered substantial player losses at the end of the successful 2014 season with four players being contracted to the NRL Telstra Premiership, two of the North Queensland Cowboys allocated players moving to the Townsville Blackhawks, and Joel Riethmuller retiring. In addition, coach J.D. resigned to take up a position as assistant coach at the Cowboys.

Player	To League	To Club
Shaun Nona	NRL Telstra Premiership	Melbourne Storm
Blake Leary	NRL Telstra Premiership	Manly-Warringah Sea Eagles
Ben Spina	NRL Telstra Premiership	North Queensland Cowboys
Davin Crampton	NRL Telstra Premiership	Gold Coast Titans
Tyrone McCarthy	English RL Super League	Hull Kingston Rovers
Latu Fifita	English RL Kingstone Press Championship	Workington Town

==== Cowboys no longer allocated to the Pride ====
Player	To League	To Club
Ricky Thorby*	allocated to	ISC Townsville Blackhawks
Kyle Feldt*	allocated to	ISC Townsville Blackhawks
Robert Lui*	allocated to	ISC Townsville Blackhawks
Matthew Wright*	allocated to	ISC Mackay Cutters
Joel Riethmuller*	Retired	

=== 2015 season launch ===
- Cairns Induction Day: 22 November 2014
- Pre-season training: 24 November 2014
- Corporate launch: 20 February 2015, Barlow Park, with Cowboys coach Paul Green and players Matt Scott and Gavin Cooper.

==== 2015 player awards ====
30 September 2015, Brothers World of Entertainment, Manunda

- Sea Swift Northern Pride Player of the Year: Jack Svendsen
- Sea Swift Players' Player: Sheldon Powe-Hobbs
- Sea Swift Members Player of the Year: Sam Obst
- Sea Swift Most improved player: Tom Hancock
- Sea Swift Best Back: Linc Port
- Sea Swift Best Forward: Graham Clark
- John O'Brien Perpetual Club Person of the Year: Jacqui Clarkson

==== 2015 player records ====
- Most Games: Jason Roos (24), Linc Port (24), Sam Obst (24).
- Most Tries: Linc Port (24)
- Most Points: Linc Port (118)
- QRL leading try scorers (2015): Linc Port, 3rd place, (24 tries), Luke George, joint 9th place, (16 tries).

==== 2015 Queensland Residents team ====
Ben Spina (c)
Patrick Kaufusi
Javid Bowen
Hezron Murgha

==== Players signed to first-tier teams ====
Player	To League	To Club
Graham Clark	NRL Telstra Premiership	Canterbury Bulldogs

==== 2015 Sponsors ====
- Naming rights sponsor: Sea Swift
- Jersey sponsor (back of jersey): Sea Swift, Brothers Leagues Club Cairns, Emu Sportswear
- Sleeve sponsor:
- Shorts sponsor: Brothers Leagues Club Cairns, Cairns Regional Council, Fuller Sports, Intrust Super, Cairns Hardware, EMU Sportswear.
- Shirt manufacturer: EMU Sportswear.
- Other sponsors: Castlemaine XXXX; Pacific Toyota; Cairns District Rugby League; Calanna Pharmacy; Tropic Wings; GATA Plastering; All Seasons Cairns Colonial Club; Cairns Plan Printing; Yalumba Winery.
- Media partners: Sea FM; WIN Television; Cairns Post.

=== 2015 Jerseys ===
2015 primary Jersey

2015 alternative Jersey

=== Trial Matches ===
Round	Opponent	Score	Date	Venue
Intra-Club Trial	Northern Pride	? – ?	Saturday, 6 February 2015	West Barlow Park, Cairns
Trial 1	CDRL Indigenous All Stars	38 – 14	Friday, 12 February 2015	Stan Williams Park, Cairns
Trial 2	South Sydney Rabbitohs	20 – 20	Saturday 14 February 2015	Redfern Oval, Sydney
Trial 3	NYC NQ Cowboys U-20s	20 – 30	Sunday 21 February 2015	Barlow Park, Cairns
Trial 4	PNG Hunters	24 – 46	Saturday 27 February 2015	Barlow Park, Cairns

Intra-Club Trial
Saturday
31 January 2015
08:30 AEST (UTC+10)

Northern Pride 'A'	v	Northern Pride 'B'
	Pride Report

West Barlow Park
(Severin Street, Parramatta Park, QLD)
Referee: CDRL referee

- Note: The West Barlow Park hit-out saw the Pride squad split into two teams. The match was adjudicated by a CDRL referee and was played over four-quarters. New coach Joe O'Callaghan got an idea of how his squad will handle the ISC Cup heat. Veteran prop Alex Starmer was given 60 minutes in a promising sign his recovery from last year's hamstring tear. Jared Verney (rolled ankle) and Graham Clark (knee) were the only players to suffer slight injuries. Jordan Biondi-Odo's excellent form makes for an interesting selection conundrum, with experienced five-eight Ben Jeffries suddenly facing a renewed push for the five-eighth role in Round 1. "This is Jordan's third preseason with us and he's been going very well", O'Callaghan said. "He knows there is a really good opportunity in the halves now with us not getting any Cowboys allocations for those positions.

Pre-season Trial 1
Saturday
7 February 2015
18:00 AEST (UTC+10)

Northern Pride	38 – 14	Townsville Blackhawks
Tries: Sam Pau 1 Ben Jeffries 1 Keelan White 1 Denzel King 1 Menmuny Murgha 1 Dean McGilvray 1 Eddie Daniel 1 Goals: Jordan Biondi-Odo (5 from 6) 5 Ben Jeffries (0 from 1) 0	Pride Preview; Pride Report; Cairns Post Report; Blackhawks Report	Tries: 1 Tyler Smith; 1 Jack Kelleher; 1 Mitchell Seri Goals: 1 Mitchell Seri (1 from 2); 0 Rhyse Matsen (0 from 1)

Stan Williams Park
(Behan St, Manunda, Cairns, QLD)
Referee: Michael Gordon
Touch judges: Peter MacKinnon, Evan Bayliss

Sea Swift Northern Pride: 1. Linc Port – FB 2. Menmuny Murgha – WG 3. Dean McGilvray – CE 4. Codey Kennedy – CE 5. Sam Pau – WG 6. Jordan Biondi Odo – FE 7. Ben Jeffries (vc) – HB 8. Travis Peeters – PR 9. Denzel King – HK 10. Sheldon Powe-Hobbs (c) – PR 11. Graham Clark – SR 12. Jack Svendsen – SR 13. Tom Hancock – LK
Unlimited Interchange: 14. Maddie Oosen, 15. Brent Oosen, 16. Nathan Wales, 17. Bradley Stephen, 18. Eddie Daniel, 19. Keelan White, 20. PJ Webb, 21. David Murphy, 22. Lachlan Parmenter, 23. Alex Starmer.
* = Cowboys allocation.
Unavailable: Justin Castellaro (ankle).
Rested: Brett Anderson, Sam Obst, Jason Roos, Semi Tadulala, Ryan Ghietti, Vaipuna Tia Kilifi, Luke George.
Townsville & District Mendi Blackhawks: 1. Jonathon Reuben, 2. Lenny Magey, 3. Samsen O'Neill, 4. Daniel Pickering, 5. Taylor Welch, 6. Nathaniel Bowman, 7. Mitchell Seri, 8. Tyler Smith, 9. Colin Wilkie, 10. Joe Mua, 11. Jack Kelleher, 12. Corey Jensen, 13. Dennis Tomarchio.
Interchange: 14. Jake McManus, 15. Adam Shaw, 16. Lona Kaifoto, 17. Temone Power, 18. Rhyse Matsen, 19. Matt Martel, 20. TBA, 21. Lestor Hero, 22. Troy O'Neil, 23. Malcom Congoo, 24. Ben Henaway,
Coach: Kristian Woolf.
Rested: Dan Beasley, Neville Costigan, Zach Daly, Jahrome Hughes, Tom Humble, Lorenzo Ma'afu, Lenny Magey, Rhyse Martin, Chris McLean, Anthony Mitchell, Nathan Norford, Samsen O'Neill, Mosese Pangai, Michael Parker-Walshe, Ricky Thorby, Wayne Ulugia.
- Note: The Pride took a youthful squad into the opening trial match. Ben Jeffries and Alex Starmer were given some match time early in the game, with forward Jack Svendsen and backline speed machine Linc Port also getting a chance to cement positions. Senior players were rested. The game was played in torrential rain which resulted in wet, muddy conditions.
  First-quarter: 10-6, Half-time: 14-10, Three quarter time: 20-10.

Kelleher's try on YouTube
Smith's try on YouTube
Seri's try on YouTube
Pau's try on YouTube
Jeffries's try on YouTube
White's try on YouTube
King's try on YouTube
Murgha's try on YouTube
McGilvray's try on YouTube
Daniel's try on YouTube

Return to Redfern match

Pre-season Trial 2
Saturday
14 February 2015
18:00 AEDT (UTC+11)

South Sydney Rabbitohs	20 – 20	Northern Pride
Tries: Setefano Taukafa 1 Sam Manuleleua 1 Eden Syme 1 Jordie Hedges 1 Goals: Jordie Hedges (2 from 4) 2	Rabbitohs Preview; Cairns Post Preview; Cairns Post Preview; Cairns Post Preview; Cairns Post Preview; SMH Report; NRL Report; Cairns Post Report	Tries: 2 Semi Tadulala; 1 Brett Anderson; 1 Luke George Goals: 1 Jordan Biondi-Odo (1 from 2); 1 Jared Verney (1 from 2)

Rabbitohs High Performance Centre
(Redfern Oval, Redfern, Sydney, NSW)
Attendance: c. 2000
Referee: Alan Shortall
In Goal Ref: Rickey McFarlane
Assistant Referee: Matt Noyen

Sea Swift Northern Pride: 1. Linc Port – FB 20. Jared Verney – WG 3. Brett Anderson (c) – CE 2. Luke George – CE 5. Semi Tadulala – WG 6. Ben Jeffries – FE 7. Sam Obst – HB 8. Sheldon Powe-Hobbs – PR 9. Jason Roos (c) – HK 10. Jack Svendsen – PR 11. Graham Clark – SR 12. Vaipuna Tia-Kilifi – SR 13. Tom Hancock – LK
Unlimited Interchange: 14. Ryan Ghietti, 15. Travis Peeters, 16. Nathan Wales, 17. Jordan Biondi-Odo, 18. David Murphy, 19. Keelan White, 21. Denzel King, 22. PJ Webb.
* = Cowboys allocation
Unavailable: Justin Castellaro (ankle), Alex Starmer (hamstring), Dean McGilvray (stomach virus).
South Sydney Rabbitohs: 1. Damon Goolagong, 2. Setefano Taukafa, 3. Aaron Gray, 4. Darren Millard, 5. Sam Manuleleua, 6. Liam Coleman, 7. Jordie Hedges, 8. Tom Burgess, 9. Scott Sorensen, 10. P J Los'e, 11. Glenn Stewart, 12. John Sutton (c), 13. Ben Lowe.
Interchange: 14. Wartovo Puara, 15. John Olive, 16. Cheyne Whitelaw, 17. Angus Crichton, 18. Tom Hughes, 19. Thompson Teteh, 20. Jack Gosiewski, 22. Clayton Williams, 23. Brock Gray, 24. Niko Roberts, 25. Aaron Booth, 26. Eden Syme, 27. Tulsa Saumamao.
Coach: Michael Maguire.
Unavailable: Greg Inglis and Chris Grevsmuhl selected for the Indigenous All Stars, Dylan Walker selected for the NRL All Stars.
Rested: Kirisome Auva'a, George Burgess, Luke Burgess, Jason Clark, Bryson Goodwin, Tim Grant, Alex Johnston, Luke Keary, Issac Luke, Sione Masima, Cameron McInnes, Chris McQueen, Joel Reddy, Adam Reynolds, David Tyrrell.
- Note: The Return to Redfern match is a celebration at the Rabbitohs traditional home ground. The 2015 Return to Redfern match was originally scheduled to be played against the Canterbury-Bankstown Bulldogs, however due to the Rabbitohs qualifying for the World Club Challenge against Super League champions St. Helens, the Return to Redfern match for 2015 was played against the Pride and the match against the Bulldogs was postponed until 2016.
  Quarter time: 0-4, Half-time 4-8; Three quarter-time 8-14.
  Sin Bin: John Sutton (c).

Pre-season Trial 3
Saturday
21 February 2015
17:00 AEST (UTC+10)

Northern Pride	20 – 30	NYC NQ Cowboys U-20s
Tries: Hezron Murgha* 2 Linc Port 1 Brett Anderson 1 Goals: Javid Bowen* (2 from 4) 2	Cowboys Preview; Cairns Post Preview; Pride Preview; Cairns Post Report	Tries: 2 Akeripa Tia Kilifi; 1 Yamba Bowie; 1 Gideon Gela-Mosby; 1 Sam Smith; Goals: 2 Cooper Bambling (2 from 3); 1 Kyle Laybutt (1 from 2); Penalty Goal: 1 Cooper Bambling

Barlow Park
(Severin Street, Parramatta Park, QLD)
Referee: Tim Rutherford, David Penna.
Touch judges: Evan Bayliss, Peter MacKinnon.

Sea Swift Northern Pride: 1. Linc Port – FB 2. Javid Bowen* – WG 3. Brett Anderson (c) – CE 4. Hezron Murgha* – CE 5. Luke George – WG 6. Ben Jeffries – FE 7. Sam Obst – HB 8. Sheldon Powe-Hobbs – PR 9. Jason Roos (c) – HK 10. Ben Spina* – PR 11. Vaipuna Tia-Kilifi – SR 12. Jack Svendsen – SR 13. Tom Hancock – LK
Unlimited Interchange: 14. Cameron King*, 15. Brent Oosen, 16. PJ Webb, 17. Patrick Kaufusi, 18. Jordan Biondi-Odo, 19. Ryan Ghietti.
* = Cowboys allocation.
Unavailable: Justin Castellaro (ankle), Alex Starmer (hamstring), Graham Clark (rib).
North Queensland Cowboys U-20s: 1. Yamba Bowie, 2. Gideon Gela-Mosby, 3. Akeripa Tia Kilifi, 4. Conor Carey, 5. Scott Schulte, 6. Ty Carucci, 7. Cooper Bambling, 8. Viliame Kikau, 9. Brandon Smith, 10. Braden Uele, 11. Coen Hess, 12. Bill Cullen, 13. Kieran Quabba.
Interchange: 14. Cyrus Timo-Latu, 15. David Munro, 16. Andrew Niemoeller, 17. Jordan Kenworthy, 18. Ross Bella, 19. Kyle Laybutt, 20. Sam Smith, 21. Nick Brown, 22. Trey Kemp.
Coach: Todd Payten.
- Note: Match was played as the curtain raiser to the NRL 'Cairns Key Real Estate Challenge' pre-season trial match between North Queensland Cowboys and Gold Coast Titans.
  Half-time 12-24.

Inaugural 'Total Food Network Challenge'

Pre-season Trial 4
Friday
27 February 2015
19:00 AEST (UTC+10)

Northern Pride	24 – 46	PNG Hunters
Tries: Vaipuna Tia Kalifi 1 Bradley Stephen 2 Nathan Wales 1 Goals: Jordan Biondi-Odo (4 from 4) 4	Cairns Post Preview; Cairns Post Preview; Cairns Post Preview; PNG Loop Report; Pride Report; Livestream	Tries: 1 Adam Korave; 2 David Lapua; 1 Ase Boas; 1 Jayjay Garrison; 1 Israel Eliab; 1 Stargroth Amean; 1 Thompson Teteh; Goals: 6 Roger Laka (6 from 8)

Barlow Park
(Severin Street, Parramatta Park, QLD)
Referee: Clayton Sharpe.
Touch judges: Peter MacKinnon, Evan Bayliss.

Sea Swift Northern Pride: 1. Jared Verney – FB 2. Sam Pau – WG 3. Dean McGilvray – CE 4. Bradley Stephen – CE 5. Menmuny Murgha – WG 6. Eddie Daniel – FE 7. Jordan Biondi-Odo (c) – HB 8. James Tamou – PR 9. Denzel King – HK 10. Travis Peeters – PR 11. Brent Oosen – SR 12. PJ Webb – SR 13. Keelan White – LK
Unlimited Interchange: 14. Maddie Oosen, 15. Codey Kennedy, 16. Lachlan Parmenter, 17. Vaipuna Tia Kilifi, 18. Nathan Wales, 19. Bill Cullen, 20. Broski Emery, 21. Jamie Kerwick.
* = Cowboys allocation
Unavailable: Justin Castellaro (ankle), Alex Starmer (hamstring), Graham Clark (rib).
Coach: Shane O'Flanagan.
SP PNG Hunters: 1. Stargroth Amean, 2. Bland Abau, 3. Lawrence Tu'u, 4. Kato Ottio, 5. David Lapua, 6. Israel Eliab, 7. Roger Laka, 8. Enock Maki, 9. Warren Glare, 10. Henry Wan, 11.Willie Minoga, 12. Brandy Peter, 13. Adam Korave.
Interchange: 14. John Ragi, 15. Thompson Teteh, 16. Esau Siune, 17. Jayjay Garrison, 18. Ase Boas, 19. Atte Bina Wabo, 20. Nickson Borana, 23. Wartovo Puara.
Coach: Michael Marum
- Note: This additional trial match was organised at the last minute after the trial match between the Ipswich Jets and PNG Hunters, scheduled to be played at Ipswich on Saturday 21 February 2015, was cancelled due to Cyclone Marcia.
  The game was the inaugural 'Total Food Network Challenge', sponsored by Total Food Network.
  Half-time 6-16.

=== Intrust Super Cup matches ===
ROUND 1: Intrust Super Cup 2015

Sunday
8 March 2015
13:40 AEST (UTC+10)

Easts Tigers	20 – 12	Northern Pride
Tries: Mahe Fonua (32') 1 Shane Neumann (37') 1 Donald Malone (44') 1 Tom Butterfield (54') 1 Goals: Shaun Nona 2 (2 from 4)	Half-time: 10 – 6 Penalties: 8 – 11; Sin Bin: Joel Romelo (20'); Joel Romelo (65'); Jack Svendsen (20'): ----- QRL Report; Cairns Post Preview; Cairns Post Preview; Cairns Post Report; QRL Report; QRL Highlights	Tries: 1 Ben Spina* (26'); 1 Patrick Kaufusi (66') Goals: 2 Jordan Biondi-Ono (2 from 2)

Tap Out Energy Stadium
(Stones Corner, Brisbane, QLD)
Referee: Chris Anderson

Sea Swift Northern Pride: 1. Lachlan Coote* – FB 2. Linc Port – WG 3. – CE 4. Hezron Murgha* – CE 5. Javid Bowen* – WG 6. Jordan Biondi-Odo – FE 7. Sam Obst – HB 8. Jack Svendsen – PR 9. Jason Roos (c) – HK 10. Ben Spina* – PR 11. Vaipuna Tia-Kilifi – SR 12. Graham Clark – SR 13. Tom Hancock – LK
Interchange: 14. Cameron King*, 15. Ryan Ghietti, 16. Sheldon Powe-Hobbs, 17. Patrick Kaufusi.
* = North Queensland Cowboys allocation (6 players allocated for this match)
Unavailable: Justin Castellaro (ankle), Alex Starmer (hamstring), Luke George (hamstring), Ben Jeffries (unavailable), Brett Anderson (thumb).
Easts Tigers: 1. Cameron Munster*, 2. Donald Malone, 3. Shane Neumann, 4. Mahe Fonua*, 5. Richie Kennar, 6. Shaun Nona*, 7. Joel Romelo, 8. Matthew Zgrajewski, 9. Tommy Butterfield, 10. Christian Welch*, 11. Dane Hogan (c), 12. Jake Foster, 13. Troy Giess.
Interchange: 14. Liam McDonald, 15. Francis Tualau, 16. Foisa Peni, 17. Dean Britt*, 18. Liam Tyson.
* = Melbourne Storm allocation (5 players allocated for this match)
Coach: Craig Ingebrigtsen.
- Note: This first round game was a 2014 Grand Final rematch.
  It was broadcast live on GEM with Matthew Thompson, Scott Sattler and Peter Psaltis as the commentary team.
  Sin bin: Joel Romelo (twice), Jack Svendsen.
  This was the Pride debut for Vaipuna Tia-Kilifi and Graham Clark (Pride Players 110 & 111) and North Queensland Cowboys allocation player Lachlan Coote* (Pride Player 109).

Position	Round 1 – 2015	P	W	D	L	B	For	Against	Diff	Pts
11	Northern Pride	1	0	0	1	0	12	20	-8	0

ROUND 2: Intrust Super Cup 2015

Saturday
14 March 2015
17:30 AEST (UTC+10)

Northern Pride	POSTPONED	Sunshine Coast Falcons
	Cairns Post Preview; Pride Preview; Pride cancellation notice

Barlow Park
(Severin Street, Parramatta Park, QLD)
Referee: Nick Pelgrave
Touch judges: Peter MacKinnon, Evan Bayliss

- Note: This match was postponed to a later date as a result of Cyclone Nathan.

Position	Round 2 – 2015	P	W	D	L	B	For	Against	Diff	Pts
12	Northern Pride	1	0	0	1	0	12	20	-8	0

ROUND 3: Intrust Super Cup 2015

Sunday
22 March 2015
13:40 AEST (UTC+10)

Northern Pride	10 – 52	Townsville Blackhawks
Tries: Luke George 1 Linc Port 1 Goals: Jordan Biondi-Odo 0 (0 from 1); Javid Bowen* 1 (1 from 1)	Half-time: 4 – 30; Penalties: 10 – 7 QRL Report; Cairns Post Report	Tries: 2 Santo; 2 Reuben; 1 Thompson; 1 Pangai; 1 McLean; 1 Hughes; 1 Hall; 1 Tom Humble; Goals: 1 Tom Humble (1 from 4); 5 Lui (5 from 6)

Barlow Park
(Severin Street, Parramatta Park, QLD)
Referee: Michael Gordon

Sea Swift Northern Pride: 1. Linc Port – FB 2. Semi Tadulala – WG 3. Javid Bowen* – CE 4. Hezron Murgha* – CE 5. Luke George – WG 6. Jordan Biondi-Odo – FE 7. Sam Obst – HB 8. Jack Svendsen – PR 9. Jason Roos (c) – HK 10. Patrick Kaufusi – PR 11. Ben Spina* – SR 12. Graham Clark – SR 13. Tom Hancock – LK
Interchange: 14. Cameron King*, 15. Ryan Ghietti, 16. Sheldon Powe-Hobbs, 17. Nathan Wales.
* = Cowboys allocation (4 players allocated for this match)
Unavailable: Justin Castellaro (ankle), Alex Starmer (hamstring), Ben Jeffries (unavailable), Brett Anderson (fractured thumb), Vaipuna Tia Kalifi (ankle).
Pride Out: Lachlan Coote* (fullback), Vaipuna Tia Kilifi (second row).
Pride In: Luke George (wing), Nathan Wales (bench).
Changes: Linc Port (wing to fullback), Semi Tadulala (centre to wing), Javid Bowen (wing to centre), Ben Spina* (front row to second row), Patrick Kaufusi (bench to front row).
Townsville & District Mendi Blackhawks: 1. Jahrome Hughes, 2. Zac Santo*, 3. Tom Humble, 4. Mosese Pangai, 5. Jonathan Reuben, 6. Robert Lui*, 7. Michael Parker-Walshe, 8. Ricky Thorby*, 9. Anthony Mitchell, 10. Daniel Beasley (c), 11. Glenn Hall*, 12. Rhyse Martin, 13. Neville Costigan.
Interchange: 14. Ray Thompson*, 15. Lorenzo Ma'afu, 16. Chris McLean, 17. Corey Jensen.
* = Cowboys allocation (4 players allocated for this match)
Coach: Kristian Woolf.
- Note: This match was scheduled to be broadcast live on Channel 9, but because there was the possibility that the game would be moved from Cairns to either Innisfail or Tully, or postponed due to Cyclone Nathan, the match between Tweed Heads Seagulls and Norths Devils was shown instead.
  Dan Beasley had signed a contract to play for the Pride this season, but he reneged and decided to stay in Townsville and play for the Blackhawks.
  Several of the Blackhawks' Cowboy allocations, (Robert Lui, Ray Thompson and Ricky Thorby), had been Pride allocations last year and had played in the Grand Final.
  This was the Pride debut for Luke George and Nathan Wales (Pride Players 112 & 113).

Position	Round 3 – 2015	P	W	D	L	B	For	Against	Diff	Pts
14	Northern Pride	2	0	0	2	0	22	72	-50	0

ROUND 4: Intrust Super Cup 2015

Saturday
28 March 2015
16:00 AEST (UTC+10)

Burleigh Bears	18 – 10	Northern Pride
Tries: Chadburn 1 Jacks 1 Sharp 1 Goals: Chadburn 3 (3 from 3)	Half-time: 12 – 6 Penalties: 2 – 8 QRL Report	Tries: 1 Luke George; 1 Semi Tadulala Goals: 1 Cameron King* (1 from 2)

Pizzey Park
(Miami, Gold Coast, QLD)
Referee: Tyson Brough

Sea Swift Northern Pride: 1. Hezron Murgha* – FB 2. Linc Port – WG 3. Brett Anderson (co-captain) – CE 4. Luke George – CE 5. Semi Tadulala – WG 6. Ryan Ghietti – FE 7. Sam Obst – HB 8. Jack Svendsen – PR 9. Jason Roos (co-captain) – HK 10. Patrick Kaufusi – PR 11. Ben Spina* – SR 12. Graham Clark – SR 13. Tom Hancock – LK
Interchange: 14. Cameron King*, 15. Nathan Wales, 16. Sheldon Powe-Hobbs, 17. David Murphy.
* = Cowboys allocation (4 players allocated for this match)
Unavailable: Justin Castellaro (ankle), Alex Starmer (hamstring), Ben Jeffries (unavailable), Vaipuna Tia Kalifi (ankle), Javid Bowen* (named for the match but then selected to play for the Cowboys.
Pride Out: Javid Bowen (centre), Jordan Biondi-Odo (five-eighth)
Pride In: Brett Anderson (centre), David Murphy (bench)
Changes: Linc Port (fullback to wing), Hezron Murgha (centre to fullback), Luke George (wing to centre), Ryan Ghietti (bench to five-eighth)
I Love Coffee Burleigh Bears: 1. Tyler Chadburn, 2. Kevin Gordon, 3. Jamie Dowling, 4. Connor Broadhurst, 5. Dimitri Pelo, 6. Todd Seymour, 7. Ryley Jacks, 8. Mark Ioane, 9. Nafe Seluini, 10. Pele Peletelese, 11. Lachlan Burr, 12. Jason Chan, 13. Darren Griffiths (c).
Interchange: 14. Tom Rowles, 15. Louis Fanene, 16. Josh Ailaomai, 19. Mitch Sharp.
* = Gold Coast Titans allocation (? players allocated for this match)
Coach: Jim Lenihan
- Note: This was the Pride debut for David Murphy (Pride Player 114).

Position	Round 4 – 2015	P	W	D	L	B	For	Against	Diff	Pts
14	Northern Pride	3	0	0	3	0	32	90	-58	0

ROUND 5: Intrust Super Cup 2015

Saturday
4 April 2015
17:00 AEST (UTC+10)

Ipswich Jets	26 – 22	Northern Pride
Tries: Barba 2 Valekapa 1 McGrady 1 Seage 1 Goals: Barba 3 (3 from 5)	Half-time: 26 – 22; Penalties: 3 – 7 QRL Report	Tries: 1 Hezron Murgha*; 1 Luke George; 2 Javid Bowen*; 1 Linc Port; Goals: 1 Cameron King* (1 from 2); 0 Javid Bowen* (0 from 3)

North Ipswich Reserve
(Ipswich, QLD)
Referee: Michael Gordon

Sea Swift Northern Pride: 1. Hezron Murgha* – FB 2. Linc Port – WG 3. Semi Tadulala – CE 4. Luke George – CE 5. Javid Bowen* – WG 6. Ryan Ghietti – FE 7. Sam Obst – HB 8. Ben Spina* – PR 9. Jason Roos (c) – HK 10. Patrick Kaufusi – PR 11. Vaipuna Tia Kalifi – SR 12. Graham Clark – SR 13. Tom Hancock – LK
Interchange: 14. Cameron King*, 15. Jack Svendsen, 16. Sheldon Powe-Hobbs, 17. David Murphy.
* = Cowboys allocation (5 players allocated for this match).
Unavailable: Justin Castellaro (ankle), Alex Starmer (hamstring), Ben Jeffries (unavailable), Brett Anderson.
Pride Out: Brett Anderson (centre), Nathan Wales (bench).
Pride In: Javid Bowen* (wing), Vaipuna Tia Kilifi (second row).
Changes: Semi Tadulala (wing to centre), Jack Svendsen (front row to bench), Ben Spina* (second row to front row).
Ipswich Jets: 1. Carlin Anderson, 2. Marmin Barba, 3. Chris Walker, 4. Nemani Valekapa, 5. Brandon McGrady, 6. Josh Cleeland, 7. Dane Phillips, 8. Josh Seage, 9. Matt Parcell, 10. Rod Griffin, 11. Sam Martin, 12. Kurt Capewell, 13. Keiron Lander (c).
Interchange: 14. Troy O'Sullivan, 15. Kurtis Lingwoodock, 16. Billy McConnachie, 17. Liam Capewell, 18. Gerico Cecil.
* = Brisbane Broncos allocation (? players allocated for this match)
Coach: Ben Walker and Shane Walker

Position	Round 5 – 2015	P	W	D	L	B	For	Against	Diff	Pts
14	Northern Pride	4	0	0	4	0	54	116	-62	0

ROUND 6: Intrust Super Cup 2015

Saturday
11 April 2015
17:30 AEST (UTC+10)

Northern Pride	18 – 16	Redcliffe Dolphins
Tries: Linc Port 3 Graham Clark 1 Goals: Cameron King* 1 (1 from 3); Javid Bowen* 0 (0 from 1)	Half-time: 0 – 12; Penalties: 7 – 2 QRL Report	Tries: 1 Opacic; 1 Pumipi; 1 Benjamin; Goals: 2 Capewell (2 from 3)

Barlow Park
(Severin Street, Parramatta Park, QLD)
Referee: Tim Rutherford

Sea Swift Northern Pride: 1. Hezron Murgha* – FB 2. Linc Port – WG 3. Javid Bowen* – CE 4. Luke George – CE 5. Codey Kennedy – WG 6. Ryan Ghietti – FE 7. Sam Obst – HB 8. Jack Svendsen – PR 9. Jason Roos (c) – HK 10. Patrick Kaufusi – PR 11. Vaipuna Tia Kalifi – SR 12. Graham Clark – SR 13. Brent Oosen – LK
Interchange: 14. Cameron King*, 15. Tom Hancock, 16. Sheldon Powe-Hobbs, 17. David Murphy.
* = Cowboys allocation (4 players allocated for this match)
Unavailable: Justin Castellaro (ankle), Alex Starmer (hamstring), Brett Anderson, Ben Spina* (named for the match but then selected to play for the Cowboys.
Pride Out: Semi Tadulala (centre), Ben Spina* (front row).
Pride In: Codey Kennedy (wing), Brent Oosen (lock).
Changes: Javid Bowen (wing to centre), Tom Hancock (lock to bench), Jack Svendsen (bench to front row).
Redcliffe Dolphins: 1. Joe Bond, 2. Oliver Regan, 3. Tristan Lumley, 4. Aaron Whitchurch, 5. Tom Opacic, 6. Evander Cummins, 7. Luke Capewell (c), 8. Charlie Faingaa, 21. Shane Pumipi, 10. Jon Green, 11. Josh Benjamin, 12. Harley Aiono, 13. Trent Richardson.
Interchange: 14. Darcy Etrich, 15. Tom Geraghty, 16. Anthony Cherrington, 17. Reggie Saunders.
* = Brisbane Broncos allocation (x players allocated for this match).
Coach: Troy Lindsay.
- Note: This was the Pride debut for Codey Kennedy (Pride Player 115).

Position	Round 6 – 2015	P	W	D	L	B	For	Against	Diff	Pts
14	Northern Pride	5	1	0	4	0	72	132	-60	2

ROUND 7: Intrust Super Cup 2015

Saturday
18 April 2015
17:30 AEST (UTC+10)

Northern Pride	42 – 10	Norths Devils
Tries: Javid Bowen* 3 Linc Port 1 Semi Tadulala 1 Sam Obst 1 Jack Svendsen 1 David Murphy 1 Goals: Hezron Murgha* 4 (4 from 5); Cameron King* 1 (1 from 2); Ben Spina* 0 (0 from 1)	Half-time: 14 – 10; Penalties: 7 – 4 QRL Report	Tries: 1 Pollock; 1 Greinke Goals: 1 Pollock (1 from 2)

Barlow Park
(Severin Street, Parramatta Park, QLD)
Referee: Chris Anderson

Sea Swift Northern Pride: 1. Hezron Murgha* – FB 2. Linc Port – WG 3. Javid Bowen* – CE 4. Dean McGilvray – CE 5. Semi Tadulala – WG 6. Ryan Ghietti – FE 7. Sam Obst – HB 8. Jack Svendsen – PR 9. Jason Roos (c) – HK 10. Patrick Kaufusi – PR 11. Vaipuna Tia Kalifi – SR 12. Graham Clark – SR 13. Ben Spina* – LK
Interchange: 14. Cameron King*, 15. Tom Hancock, 16. Sheldon Powe-Hobbs, 17. David Murphy.
* = Cowboys allocation (5 players allocated for this match).
Unavailable: Justin Castellaro (ankle), Alex Starmer (hamstring), Brett Anderson (hand), Luke George (elbow), Codey Kennedy (hip flexor).
Pride Out: Luke George (centre), Codey Kennedy (wing), Brent Oosen (lock).
Pride In: Dean McGilvray (centre), Semi Tadulala (wing), Ben Spina* (lock).
Norths Devils: 1. Luke Pollock, 2. Steve Elliott, 3. Dylan Galloway, 4. Kainga Turner, 5. Rogan Dean, 6. Sam Foster, 7. Sean Yorston, 8. Richard Tuala, 9. Krys Freeman, 10. Francis Molo, 11. Rhett Webster, 12. Brett Greinke (c), 13. Todd Lowrie.
Interchange: 14. Byron Creighton, 15. Max Seumanutafa, 16. Matt Mizzi, 17. Josh Afoa.
* = Brisbane Broncos allocation (x players allocated for this match).
Coach: Mark Gliddon.
- Note: This was the Pride debut for Dean McGilvray (Pride Player 116).

Position	Round 7 – 2015	P	W	D	L	B	For	Against	Diff	Pts
9	Northern Pride	6	2	0	4	0	114	142	-28	4

ROUND 8: Intrust Super Cup 2015

Sunday
26 April 2015
12:30 AEST (UTC+10)

Northern Pride	36 – 18	Souths Logan Magpies
Tries: Linc Port 3 Vaipuna Tia Kalifi 1 Ben Spina* 1 Ryan Ghietti 1 Dean McGilvray 1 Goals: Hezron Murgha* 4 (4 from 7)	Half-time: 16 – 6 Penalties: 3 – 10; QRL Report	Tries: 1 Tuimavave; 2 Doyle Goals: 3 Doyle (3 from 3)

Barlow Park
(Severin Street, Parramatta Park, QLD)
Referee: Nick Morel
Player of the Match: Javid Bowen*

Sea Swift Northern Pride: 1. Hezron Murgha* – FB 2. Linc Port – WG 3. Javid Bowen* – CE 4. Dean McGilvray – CE 5. Semi Tadulala – WG 6. Ryan Ghietti – FE 7. Sam Obst – HB 8. Jack Svendsen – PR 9. Jason Roos (c) – HK 10. Patrick Kaufusi – PR 11. Vaipuna Tia Kalifi – SR 12. Graham Clark – SR 13. Ben Spina* – LK
Interchange: 14. Cameron King*, 15. Tom Hancock, 16. Sheldon Powe-Hobbs, 17. David Murphy.
* = Cowboys allocation (5 players allocated for this match)
Unavailable: Justin Castellaro (ankle), Alex Starmer (hamstring), Brett Anderson (hand), Luke George (elbow), Codey Kennedy (hip flexor).
Souths Logan Magpies: 1. Josh Damen, 20. Ramon Filipine, 3. Dallas Anderson, 4. Tim Brooks, 5. Matt Trnka, 6. Jack Joass, 7. Oliver Olds, 8. Sam Gardel, 9. Travis Waddell, 10. Andrew Edwards, 11. Scott Doyle, 12. Dan Tamou, 13. Joe Boyce.
Interchange: 14. Herschel Gideon, 15. Phil Dennis (c), 16. Graham Levu, 17. Aotealofa Tuimavave.
* = Brisbane Broncos allocation (? players allocated for this match)
Coach: Josh Hannay.
- Note: Delayed telecast broadcast at 1.40 pm on Channel 9 with Matthew Thompson, Scott Sattler and Peter Psaltis as the commentary team.
  Half-time Pride 16-6 Magpies.
  After the match the Queensland Residents side was named which included Pride players Hezron Murgha*, Javid Bowen*, Ben Spina* and Patrick Kaufusi.
  This match was played as the curtain-raiser for the NRL Round 8 match between South Sydney Rabbitohs and Canberra Raiders, which the Raiders won 22-30.

Position	Round 8 – 2015	P	W	D	L	B	For	Against	Diff	Pts
9	Northern Pride	7	3	0	4	0	150	160	-10	6

DELAYED ROUND 2: Intrust Super Cup 2015

Sunday
3 May 2015
14:00 AEST (UTC+10)

Northern Pride	30 – 10	Sunshine Coast Falcons
Tries: Luke George 2 Cameron King* 1 Bradley Stephen 2 Tom Hancock 1 Goals: Cameron King* 3 (3 from 3); Linc Port 2 (2 from 3)	Half-time: 24 – 0 Penalties: 4 – 7 QRL Report	Tries: 1 Tonumaipea; 1 Robinson Goals: 0 Doherty (0 from 1); 1 Robinson (1 from 1)

Barlow Park
(Severin Street, Parramatta Park, QLD)
Referee: Clayton Sharpe

Sea Swift Northern Pride: 1. Linc Port – FB 2. Bradley Stephen – WG 3. Luke George – CE 4. Dean McGilvray – CE 5. Semi Tadulala – WG 6. Ryan Ghietti – FE 7. Sam Obst – HB 8. Jack Svendsen – PR 9. Jason Roos (c) – HK 10. Sheldon Powe-Hobbs – PR 11. Vaipuna Tia Kalifi – SR 12. Graham Clark – SR 13. Tom Hancock – LK
Interchange: 14. Cameron King*, 16. Alex Starmer, 17. David Murphy, 18. Regan Verney,
* = Cowboys allocation (1 player allocated for this match)
Unavailable: Brett Anderson (hand); Codey Kennedy (hip flexor); Hezron Murgha*, Javid Bowen*, Ben Spina* and Patrick Kaufusi (selected for the Queensland Residents side).
Pride Out: Hezron Murgha (fullback), Javid Bowen (centre), Patrick Kaufusi (front row), Ben Spina* (lock).
Pride In: Bradley Stephen (wing), Luke George (centre), Alex Starmer (bench), Regan Verney (bench).
Changes: Linc Port (wing to fullback), Tom Hancock (bench to lock), Sheldon Powe-Hobbs (bench to front row).
Sunshine Coast Falcons: 1. Sam Young, 2. Callum Klein, 3. Hymel Hunt*, 4. Travis Robinson*, 5. Young Tonumaipea, 6. Billy Kitt, 7. Brett Doherty, 8. Tom Learoyd-Lahrs*, 9. Billy Brittain*, 10. Ryan Hansen, 11. Rueben Baillie, 12. Jake Samoa, 13. Johnny Vuetibau.
Interchange: 14. Jay William Lobwein, 15. James Ackerman, 16. Jon Platt, 17. Jordan Ryan, 18. Jye Ballinger.
* = Melbourne Storm allocation (4 players allocated for this match)
Coach: Glen Dreger.
- Note: This match was due to be played on Saturday 14 April at 5.30 pm but was delayed due to Cyclone Nathan.
  This was the Pride debut for Bradley Stephen and Regan Verney (Pride Players 117 & 118).

Position	Round 2 – 2015	P	W	D	L	B	For	Against	Diff	Pts
9	Northern Pride	8	4	0	4	0	184	170	+14	8

ROUND 9: Intrust Super Cup 2015

Sunday
10 May 2015
14:30 PNG Pacific Time (UTC+10)

Papua New Guinea Hunters	36 – 16	Northern Pride
Tries: Wera 2 Zeming 1 Boas 1 Puara 1 Ottio 1 Minoga 1 Goals: Zeming 3 Bland Tony 1	Half-time: 10 – 10; Penalties: 4 – 5 QRL Report	Tries: 2 Luke George; 1 Patrick Kaufusi Goals: 2 Javid Bowen*

Kalabond Oval
(Kokopo, East New Britain Province, PNG)
Referee: Michael Gordon

Sea Swift Northern Pride: 1. Linc Port – FB 2. Semi Tadulala – WG 3. Javid Bowen* – CE 4. Dean McGilvray – CE 5. Luke George – WG 6. Ryan Ghietti – FE 7. Sam Obst – HB 8. Jack Svendsen – PR 9. Jason Roos (c) – HK 10. Patrick Kaufusi – PR 11. Vaipuna Tia Kalifi – SR 12. Regan Verney – SR 13. David Murphy – LK
Interchange: 14. Cameron King*, 15. Tom Hancock, 16. Sheldon Powe-Hobbs, 17. Alex Starmer.
* = Cowboys allocation (3 players allocated for this match)
Unavailable: Brett Anderson (hand), Codey Kennedy (hip flexor), Graham Clark (birth of first child), Bradley Stephen (passport issues), Hezron Murgha* (personal reasons), Ben Spina* (selected for the North Queensland Cowboys).
Pride Out: Bradley Stephen (wing), Graham Clark (second row).
Pride In: Javid Bowen (centre), Patrick Kaufusi (front row).
Changes: Luke George (centre to wing), Sheldon Powe-Hobbs (front row to bench), Tom Hancock (lock to bench), David Murphy (bench to lock), Regan Verney (bench to second row)
PNG Hunters: 1. Stargroth Amean, 2. Bland Abavu, 3. Noel Zeming, 4. Thompson Teteh, 5. Adex Wera, 6. Israel Eliab (c), 7. Ase Boas, 8. Henry Noki, 9. Wartovo Puara, 10. Esau Siune, 11. Kato Ottio, 12. Brandy Peter, 13. Adam Korave.
Interchange: 14. Roger Laka, 15. Lawrence Tu'u, 16. Willie Minoga, 17. Timothy Lomai, 18. Atte Bina, 19. Edward Goma, 20. David Lapua.
Coach: Michael Marum.

Position	Round 9 – 2015	P	W	D	L	B	For	Against	Diff	Pts
8	Northern Pride	9	4	0	5	0	200	206	-6	8

ROUND 10: Intrust Super Cup 2015

Round 10
16–17 May 2015

Northern Pride	Bye	Bye

Venue:
Bye

Note:

Position	Round 10 – 2015	P	W	D	L	B	For	Against	Diff	Pts
7	Northern Pride	10	4	0	5	1	200	206	-6	10

ROUND 11: Intrust Super Cup 2015

Saturday
23 May 2015
17:00 AEST (UTC+10)

Wynnum Manly Seagulls	20 – 21	Northern Pride
Tries: Ogden 1 Eden 1 Frei 1 Goals: Seamark 3 Penalty Goal: Seamark 1 Field Goal:	Half-time: 8 – 14; Penalties: 8 – 5 QRL Report	Tries: 1 Luke George; 1 Bradley Stephen; 1 Sam Obst; 1 Tom Hancock; Goals: 2 Hezron Murgha* (2 from 4); Penalty Goal: Field Goal; 1 Ryan Ghietti

BMD Kougari Oval
(Manly West, Brisbane, QLD)
Referee: Nick Morel
Player of the Match: Sam Obst

Sea Swift Northern Pride: 1. Hezron Murgha* – FB 2. Linc Port – WG 3. Brett Anderson (co-captain) – CE 4. Luke George – CE 6. Ryan Ghietti – WG 7. Sam Obst – FE 8. Jack Svendsen – HB 9. Jason Roos (co-captain) – PR 10. David Murphy – HK 11. Vaipuna Tia Kalifi – PR 12. Graham Clark – SR 13. Tom Hancock – SR 14. Denzel King – LK
Interchange: 15. Regan Verney, 16. Sheldon Powe-Hobbs, 19. Bradley Stephen, 20. Patrick Kaufusi.
* = Cowboys allocation (3 players allocated for this match)
Unavailable: Ben Spina*, Javid Bowen* and Cameron King* (selected for the North Queensland Cowboys).
Pride Out: Semi Tadulala (wing), Javid Bowen* (centre), Dean McGilvray (centre), Cameron King* (bench), Alex Starmer (bench).
Pride In: Hezron Murgha (fullback), Brett Anderson (centre), Graham Clark (second row), Denzel King (lock), Bradley Stephen (bench).
Changes: Linc Port (fullback to wing), Luke George (wing to centre), Ryan Ghietti (five-eighth to wing), Sam Obst (halfback to five-eighth), Jack Svendsen (front row to halfback), Jason Roos (hooker to front row), Patrick Kaufusi (front row to bench), Vaipuna Tia Kilifi (second row to front row), Regan Verney (second row to bench), David Murphy (lock to hooker), Tom Hancock (bench to second row).
Wynnum Manly Seagulls: 1. Daniel Ogden, 2. Peter Gubb, 3. Matthew Grieve, 4. Mitchell Buckett, 5. Greg Eden, 6. Patrick Templeman, 7. Matthew Seamark, 8. Ben Shea, 9. Alehana Mara, 10. Tim Natusch (c), 11. Aaron Rockley, 12. Brendon Gibb, 13. Mitchell Frei.
Interchange: 14. John Te Reo, 15. Jon Grieve, 16. Tanu Wulf, 17. Olsi Krasniqi.
* = Brisbane Broncos allocation (x players allocated for this match).
Coach: Jon Buchanan.
- Note: This was the Pride debut for Denzel King (Pride Player 119).

Position	Round 11 – 2015	P	W	D	L	B	For	Against	Diff	Pts
7	Northern Pride	11	5	0	5	1	221	226	-5	12

ROUND 12: Intrust Super Cup 2015 – XXXX Rivalry Round

Sunday
31 May 2015
14:00 AEST (UTC+10)

Northern Pride	10 – 12	Mackay Cutters
Tries: Luke George 1 Jason Roos 1 Goals: Javid Bowen* 1 (1 from 3)	Half-time: 4 – 6 Penalties: 5 – 6 QRL Report	Tries: 2 Pereira Goals: 2 Taylor (2 from 2)

Barlow Park
(Severin Street, Parramatta Park, QLD)
Referee: Tim Rutherford

Sea Swift Northern Pride: 1. Hezron Murgha* – FB 2. Linc Port – WG 3. Brett Anderson (co-captain) – CE 4. Javid Bowen* – CE 5. Luke George – WG 6. Ryan Ghietti – FE 7. Sam Obst – HB 8. Jack Svendsen – PR 9. Jason Roos (co-captain) – HK 10. David Murphy – PR 11. Vaipuna Tia Kalifi – SR 12. Graham Clark – SR 13. Tom Hancock – LK
Interchange: 14. Cameron King*, 16. Sheldon Powe-Hobbs, 21. Ben Spina*, 22. Patrick Kaufusi.
* = Cowboys allocation (3 players allocated for this match)
Unavailable: Semi Tadulala (hamstring).
Pride Out: Denzel King (lock), Regan Verney (bench), Bradley Stephen (bench).
Pride In: Javid Bowen* (centre), Cameron King* (bench), Ben Spina* (bench).
Changes: Luke George (centre to wing), Ryan Ghietti (wing to five-eighth), Sam Obst (five-eighth to halfback), Jack Svendsen (halfback to front row), Jason Roos (front row to hooker), David Murphy (hooker to front row), Vaipuna Tia Kilifi (front row to second row), Tom Hancock (second row to lock)
Mackay Cutters: 1. Sam Clune, 2. Jordan Pereira, 3. Tyson Martin, 4. Justin Tavae, 5. Zack Walker, 6. Cameron Cullen, 7. Liam Taylor, 8. Brad Lupi, 9. Michael Sio, 10. Chris Gesch (c), 11. Brenden Treston, 12. Josh Osborne, 13. Aleki Falepaini.
Interchange: 14. Josh Chudleigh*, 16. Joss Boyton, 17. Rory Kostjasyn, 18. Ryan Kinlyside.
* = North Queensland Cowboys allocation (? players allocated for this match).
Coach: Kim Williams.

Position	Round 12 – 2015	P	W	D	L	B	For	Against	Diff	Pts
8	Northern Pride	12	5	6	0	1	231	238	-7	10

ROUND 13: Intrust Super Cup 2015

Saturday
6 June 2015
17:30 AEST (UTC+10)

Northern Pride	24 – 18	Tweed Heads Seagulls
Tries: Graham Clark 2 Javid Bowen* 1 Linc Port 2 Goals: Linc Port 2 (2 from 5); Penalty Goals: Linc Port 0 (0 from 1)	Half-time: 10 – 18; Penalties: 4 – 4 QRL Report	Tries: 2 Anderson; 1 Robinson Goals: 3 Fogarty (3 from 3)

Barlow Park
(Severin Street, Parramatta Park, QLD)
Referee: Clayton Sharpe

Sea Swift Northern Pride: 1. Hezron Murgha* – FB 2. Linc Port – WG 3. Brett Anderson (co-captain) – CE 4. Javid Bowen* – CE 5. Luke George – WG 6. Ryan Ghietti – FE 7. Sam Obst – HB 8. Jack Svendsen – PR 9. Jason Roos (co-captain) – HK 10. Patrick Kaufusi – PR 11. Vaipuna Tia Kalifi – SR 12. Graham Clark – SR 13. Ben Spina* – LK
Interchange: 14. Cameron King*, 15. Tom Hancock, 16. Sheldon Powe-Hobbs, 17. Dave Murphy.
* = Cowboys allocation (5 players allocated for this match)
Unavailable: Semi Tadulala (hamstring).
David Murphy (front row to bench), Tom Hancock (lock to bench), Ben Spina* (bench to lock), Patrick Kaufusi (bench to front row)*.
Tweed Heads Seagulls: 1. Shaun Carney, 2. Nathanael Barnes, 3. Leva Li, 5. Kalifa Faifai-Loa, 6. Ricardo Parata, 7. Jamal Fogarty, 8. Damian Sironen (c), 9. Sam Meskell, 10. Oliver Percy, 11. Matt Robinson, 12. Dane Clarke, 13. Sam Saville, 14. Blake Anderson.
Interchange: 15. Mark Offerdahl, 16. Matt White, 17. Will Bugden, 18. Etham Price. (Davin Crampton ruled out at the last minute due to a knee injury).
* = Gold Coast Titans allocation (? players allocated for this match)
Coach: Aaron Zimmerle

Position	Round 13 – 2015	P	W	D	L	B	For	Against	Diff	Pts
7	Northern Pride	13	6	0	6	1	255	256	-1	14

ROUND 14: Intrust Super Cup 2015

Sunday
14 June 2015
14:00 AEST (UTC+10)

Sunshine Coast Falcons	6 – 28	Northern Pride
Tries: Vunivalu 1 Goals: Oakes 1 (1 from 1)	Half-time: 0 – 8 Penalties: 6 – 9 QRL Report	Tries: 2 Linc Port; 2 Brett Anderson; 1 Luke George; 1 Semi Tadulala; Goals: 2 Linc Port (2 from 6)

Stockland Park
(Sportsmans Parade, Bokarina, Kawana Waters, QLD)
Referee: Tim Rutherford

Sea Swift Northern Pride: 1. Hezron Murgha* – FB 2. Linc Port – WG 3. Brett Anderson (co-captain) – CE 4. Luke George – CE 5. Semi Tadulala – WG 6. Ryan Ghietti – FE 7. Sam Obst – HB 9. Jason Roos (co-captain) – PR 10. Patrick Kaufusi – HK 11. Vaipuna Tia Kalifi – PR 12. Regan Verney – SR 13. Ben Spina* – SR 14. Cameron King* – LK
Interchange: 15. Tom Hancock, 16. Sheldon Powe-Hobbs, 17. David Murphy, 18. Alex Starmer.
* = Cowboys allocation (3 players allocated for this match)
Unavailable: Graham Clark (ankle), Javid Bowen* (dislocated shoulder)
Pride Out: Javid Bowen (centre), Jack Svendsen (front row), Graham Clark (second row)
Pride In: Semi Tadulala (wing), Regan Verney (second row), Alex Starmer (bench)
Changes: Luke George (wing to centre), Jason Roos (hooker to front row), Patrick Kaufusi (front row to hooker), Vaipuna Tia Kilifi (second row to front row), Ben Spina* (lock to second row), Cameron King* (bench to lock)
Sunshine Coast Falcons: 1. Sam Wright, 2. Sam Young, 3. Rueben Baillie, 4. Travis Robinson, 5. Suliasi Vunivalu, 6. David Oakes, 7. Jake Turpin 8. James Ackerman, 9. Jay Lobwein, 10. Ryan Hansen, 11. Jye Ballinger, 12. Jake Samoa, 13. Tom Murphy (c).
Interchange: 14. Brett Doherty, 15. Johnny Vuetiba'u 16. Mboya Adams, 18. Sam Sotogi.
* = Melbourne Storm allocation (x players allocated for this match)
Coach: Glen Dreger.

Position	Round 14 – 2015	P	W	D	L	B	For	Against	Diff	Pts
7	Northern Pride	14	7	0	6	1	283	262	+21	16

ROUND 15: Intrust Super Cup 2015

Saturday
20 June 2015
17:00 AEST (UTC+10)

Townsville Blackhawks	42 – 24	Northern Pride
Tries: Santo 3 Parker-Walshe 2 Hughes 1 Pangai 1 Goals: Tom Humble 4 Jensen 1	Half-time: 32 – 6 Penalties: 9 – 7 QRL Report	Tries: 1 Hezron Murgha*; 1 Brett Anderson; 1 Luke George; 1 Vaipuna Tia Kilifi; Goals: 4 Linc Port (4 from 4)

Jack Manski Oval
(Golf Links Drive, Kirwan, QLD)
Referee: Nick Morel

Sea Swift Northern Pride: 1. Hezron Murgha* – FB 2. Linc Port – WG 3. Brett Anderson (co-captain) – CE 4. Luke George – CE 5. Semi Tadulala – WG 6. Ryan Ghietti – FE 7. Sam Obst – HB 8. Jack Svendsen – PR 9. Jason Roos (co-captain) – HK 10. Patrick Kaufusi – PR 11. Vaipuna Tia Kalifi – SR 12. Graham Clark – SR 13. Ben Spina* – LK
Interchange: 15. Tom Hancock, 16. Sheldon Powe-Hobbs, 17. David Murphy, 18. Denzel King.
* = Cowboys allocation (4 players allocated for this match)
Pride Out: Regan Verney (second row), Cameron King* (lock), Alex Starmer (bench).
Pride In: Jack Svendsen (front row), Graham Clark (second row), Denzel King (bench).
Changes: Jason Roos (front row to hooker), Patrick Kaufusi (hooker to front row), Vaipuna Tia Kilifi (front row to second row), Ben Spina* (second row to lock).
Townsville Blackhawks: 1. Jahrome Hughes 2. Zac Santo 3. Noel Underwood 4. Kyle Feldt 5. Jonathan Reuben 6. Robert Lui 7. Michael Parker-Walshe 8. Lorenzo Ma'afu 9. Anthony Mitchell 10. Daniel Beasley (c) 11. Glenn Hall 12. Rhyse Martin 13. Neville Costigan.
Interchange: 14. Tom Humble, 15. Corey Jensen, 16. Kelepi Tanginoa, 17. Jack Kelleher.
* = North Queensland Cowboys allocation (? players allocated for this match)
Coach: Kristian Woolf.

Position	Round 15 – 2015	P	W	D	L	B	For	Against	Diff	Pts
8	Northern Pride	15	7	0	7	1	307	304	+3	14

ROUND 16: Intrust Super Cup 2015

Saturday
27 June 2015
17:30 AEST (UTC+10)

Northern Pride	20 – 14	Ipswich Jets
Tries: Vaipuna Tia Kilifi 2 Linc Port 1 Goals: Justin Castellaro 3 (3 from 3); Penalty Goals; Justin Castellaro 1	Half-time: 18 – 0 Penalties: 8 – 4 QRL Report	Tries: 1 Carlin Anderson; 1 McGrady; Goals: 2 Carlin Anderson (2 from 2)

Barlow Park
(Severin Street, Parramatta Park, QLD)
Referee: Michael Gordon

Sea Swift Northern Pride: 1. Hezron Murgha* – FB 2. Linc Port – WG 3. Brett Anderson (co-captain) – CE 4. Justin Castellaro – CE 5. Luke George – WG 6. Ryan Ghietti – FE 7. Sam Obst – HB 8. Jack Svendsen – PR 9. Jason Roos (co-captain) – HK 10. Scott Bolton* – PR 11. Vaipuna Tia Kalifi – SR 12. Graham Clark – SR 14. Keelan White – LK
Interchange: 15. Tom Hancock, 16. Sheldon Powe-Hobbs, 17. Alex Starmer, 20. David Murphy.
* = Cowboys allocation (2 players allocated for this match).
Unavailable: Ben Spina* (rib), Ryan Ghietti (shoulder), Regan Verney (fractured eye socket), Sam Pau (broken leg), Cameron King* and Patrick Kaufusi selected for the North Queensland Cowboys.
Pride Out: Semi Tadulala (wing), Patrick Kaufusi (front row), Ben Spina* (lock), Denzel King (bench).
Pride In: Justin Castellaro (centre), Scott Bolton* (front row), Keelan White (lock), Alex Starmer (bench).
Changes: Luke George (centre to wing).
Ipswich Jets: 1. Carlin Anderson, 2. Marmin Barba, 3. Chris Walker, 4. Nemani Valekapa, 5. Brandon McGrady, 6. Josh Cleeland, 7. Dane Phillips, 8. Josh Seage, 9. Landon Hayes, 10. Rod Griffin, 11. Sam Martin, 12. Kurt Capewell, 13. Keiron Lander (c).
Interchange: 14. Fakahoko Teutau, 15. Kurtis Lingwoodock, 16. Billy McConnachie, 17. Gerico Cecil.
* = Brisbane Broncos allocation (? players allocated for this match).
Coach: Ben Walker and Shane Walker.

Position	Round 16 – 2015	P	W	D	L	B	For	Against	Diff	Pts
7	Northern Pride	16	8	0	7	1	327	318	+9	18

ROUND 17: Intrust Super Cup 2015

Saturday
4 July 2015
17:30 AEST (UTC+10)

Northern Pride	24 – 12	Easts Tigers
Tries: Linc Port 1 Justin Castellaro 1 Luke George 1 Keelan White 1 Goals: Justin Castellaro 4 (4 from 4)	Half-time: 10 – 0 Penalties: 6 – 3 QRL Report	Tries: 2 Kai Goals: 2 Nona (2 from 2)

Barlow Park
(Severin Street, Parramatta Park, QLD)
Referee: Chris Anderson

Sea Swift Northern Pride: 2. Linc Port – FB 3. Brett Anderson (co-captain) – WG 4. Justin Castellaro – CE 5. Luke George – CE 6. Ryan Ghietti – WG 9. Jason Roos (co-captain) – FE 10. Sheldon Powe-Hobbs – HB 11. David Murphy – PR 12. Graham Clark – HK 13. Tom Hancock – PR 14. Sam Obst – SR 15. PJ Webb – SR 16. Keelan White – LK
Interchange: 17. Brent Oosen, 18. Semi Tadulala, 19. Cameron King*, 20. Jack Svensden.
* = Cowboys allocation (1 player allocated for this match)
Unavailable: Ben Spina* (rib), Regan Verney (fractured eye socket), Sam Pau (broken leg), Vaipuna Tia Kalifi and Patrick Kaufusi selected for the North Queensland Cowboys).
Pride Out: Hezron Murgha (fullback), Scott Bolton* (front row), Vaipuna Tia Kilifi (second row), Alex Starmer (bench).
Pride In: PJ Webb (second row), Brent Oosen (bench), Semi Tadulala (bench), Cameron King (bench)
Changes: Linc Port (wing to fullback), Brett Anderson (centre to wing), Luke George (wing to centre), Ryan Ghietti (five-eighth to wing), Sam Obst (halfback to second row), Jack Svendsen (front row to bench), Jason Roos (hooker to five-eighth), Graham Clark (second row to hooker), Tom Hancock (bench to front row), Sheldon Powe-Hobbs (bench to halfback), David Murphy (bench to front row)
Easts Tigers: 1. Donald Malone, 2. Maeli Seve, 3. Whetu Austin, 4. Michael Kai, 5. Brandon Downey, 6. Shaun Nona, 19. Brentt Warr, 8. Foisa Peni, 9. Tommy Butterfield, 10. Liam McDonald, 11. Dane Hogan (c), 12. Jake Foster, 13. Troy Giess.
Interchange: 14. Mathew Pitman, 15. Matthew Zgrajewski, 16. Brenton Horwood, 17. Billy Walters.
* = Melbourne Storm allocation (? players allocated for this match).
Coach: Craig Ingebrigtsen
- Note: This was the Pride debut for Keelan White (Pride Player 120).

Position	Round 17 – 2015	P	W	D	L	B	For	Against	Diff	Pts
8	Northern Pride	17	9	0	7	1	x	x	+x	20

ROUND 18: Intrust Super Cup 2015

Saturday
11 July 2015
17:00 AEST (UTC+10)

Souths Logan Magpies	17 – 8	Northern Pride
Tries: Brooks 1 Jacks 1 Waddell 1 Goals: Joass 2 (2 from 3); Field Goals: Waddell 1	Half-time: 10 – 4 Penalties: 3 – 2 QRL Report	Tries: 1 Brett Anderson; 1 Justin Castellaro Goals: 0 from 2 Field Goals:

Tully Showgrounds
(Butler Street, Tully, QLD)
Referee: Jarrod Cole

Sea Swift Northern Pride: 1. Hezron Murgha* – FB 2. Linc Port – WG 3. Brett Anderson (co-captain) – CE 4. Justin Castellaro – CE 5. Luke George – WG 6. Ryan Ghietti – FE 7. Sam Obst – HB 8. Jack Svendsen – PR 9. Jason Roos (co-captain) – HK 10. Patrick Kaufusi – PR 11. PJ Webb – SR 12. Graham Clark – SR 13. Tom Hancock – LK
Interchange: 14. Cameron King*, 16. Sheldon Powe-Hobbs, 17. David Murphy, 20. Alex Starmer.
* = Cowboys allocation (3 players allocated for this match)
Unavailable: Ben Spina* (rib), Regan Verney (fractured eye socket), Sam Pau (broken leg), Vaipuna Tia Kalifi.
Pride Out: Keelan White (lock), Brent Oosen (bench), Semi Tadulala (bench).
Pride In: Hezron Murgha (fullback), Patrick Kaufusi (front row), Alex Starmer (bench).
Changes: Linc Port (fullback to wing), Brett Anderson (wing to centre), Luke George (centre to wing), Ryan Ghietti (wing to five-eighth), Jason Roos (five-eighth to hooker), Sheldon Powe-Hobbs (halfback to bench), David Murphy (front row to bench), Graham Clark (hooker to second row), Tom Hancock (front row to lock), Sam Obst (second row to halfback), Jack Svendsen (bench to front row).
Souths Logan Magpies: 1. Brandon Khuu, 2. Josh Damen, 3. Dallas Anderson, 4. Scott Doyle, 5. Tim Brooks, 6. Jack Joass, 7. Rhys Jacks, 8. Tikiko Noke, 9. Travis Waddell, 10. Andrew Edwards, 11. Joe Boyce, 12. Dan Tamou, 13. Phil Dennis (c).
Interchange: 14. Jack Anderson, 15. Ben Thorburn, 16. Sam Gardel, 17. Leon Panapa, 18. Ken Levu.
* = Brisbane Broncos allocation (? players allocated for this match).
Coach: Josh Hannay.

Position	Round 18 – 2015	P	W	D	L	B	For	Against	Diff	Pts
7	Northern Pride	18	9	0	8	1	359	347	+12	20

ROUND 19: Intrust Super Cup 2015

Sunday
19 July 2015
15:00 AEST (UTC+10)

Tweed Heads Seagulls	12 – 24	Northern Pride
Tries: Anderson 1 Srama 1 Goals: Anderson 2	Half-time: 6 – 14; Penalties: 8 – 7 QRL Report	Tries: 2 Vaipuna Tia Kilifi; 1 Linc Port; 1Javid Bowen*; 1 Sam Obst; Goals: 1 Justin Castellaro; 1 Javid Bowen*

Piggabeen Sports Complex
(Caramar Drive, Tweed Heads West, NSW)
Referee: Liam Kennedy.

Sea Swift Northern Pride: 1. Hezron Murgha* – FB 2. Linc Port – WG 3. Brett Anderson (co-captain) – CE 4. Justin Castellaro – CE 5. Javid Bowen* – WG 6. Ryan Ghietti – FE 7. Sam Obst – HB 8. Jack Svendsen – PR 9. Jason Roos (co-captain) – HK 10. Ben Spina* – PR 11. Vaipuna Tia Kilifi – SR 12. Graham Clark – SR 13. David Murphy – LK
Interchange: 14. Cameron King*, 15. Tom Hancock, 16. Sheldon Powe-Hobbs, 20. Patrick Kaufusi.
* = Cowboys allocation (4 players allocated for this match).
Unavailable: Regan Verney (fractured eye socket), Sam Pau (broken leg), Alex Starmer (shoulder), Cameron King* and Patrick Kaufusi selected for the North Queensland Cowboys).
Pride Out: Luke George (wing), PJ Webb (second row), Alex Starmer (bench).
Pride In: Javid Bowen* (wing), Ben Spina* (front row), Vaipuna Tia Kilifi (second row).
Changes: Patrick Kaufusi (front row to bench), Tom Hancock (lock to bench), David Murphy (bench to lock).
Tweed Heads Seagulls: 1. Ali Grant, 2. Nathanael Barnes, 3. James Wood (c), 4. Kalifa Faifai-Loa, 5. Leva Li, 6. Shaun Carney, 7. Karl Lawton, 8. Matt White, 9. Sam Meskell, 10. Oliver Percy, 11. Matt Robinson, 12. Blake Anderson, 13. Sam Saville.
Interchange: 14. Ricardo Parata, 15. Dane Clarke, 16. Will Bugden, 17. Ethan Price.
* = Gold Coast Titans allocation (? players allocated for this match).
Coach: Aaron Zimmerle.

Position	Round 19 – 2015	P	W	D	L	B	For	Against	Diff	Pts
7	Northern Pride	19	10	0	8	1	383	359	+24	22

ROUND 20: Intrust Super Cup 2015

25–26 July 2015

Northern Pride	BYE

Position	Round 20 – 2015	P	W	D	L	B	For	Against	Diff	Pts
7	Northern Pride	20	10	0	8	2	383	359	+24	24

ROUND 21: Intrust Super Cup 2015

Saturday
1 August 2015
17:30 AEST (UTC+10)

Northern Pride	16 – 4	Burleigh Bears
Tries: Hezron Murgha* 1 Linc Port 1 Brett Anderson 1 Goals: Justin Castellaro 2 (2 from 4)	Half-time: 6 – 2 Penalties: 4 – 9 QRL Report	Tries: Goals: Penalty Goals: 2 Walters

Barlow Park
(Severin Street, Parramatta Park, QLD)
Referee: Chris Anderson

Sea Swift Northern Pride: 1. Hezron Murgha* – FB 2. Linc Port – WG 3. Brett Anderson (co-captain) – CE 4. Justin Castellaro – CE 5. Javid Bowen* – WG 6. Ryan Ghietti – FE 7. Sam Obst – HB 8. Jack Svendsen – PR 9. Jason Roos (co-captain) – HK 10. Patrick Kaufusi – PR 11. Vaipuna Tia Kilifi – SR 12. Graham Clark – SR 13. Ben Spina* – LK
Interchange: 14. Cameron King*, 15. Tom Hancock, 16. Sheldon Powe-Hobbs, 17. David Murphy.
* = Cowboys allocation (5 players allocated for this match).
Unavailable: Regan Verney (fractured eye socket), Sam Pau (broken leg), Alex Starmer (shoulder).
Changes: Ben Spina* (front row to lock), David Murphy (lock to bench), Patrick Kaufusi (bench to front row).
Burleigh Bears: 1. Talor Walters, 2. Connor Broadhurst, 3. Jamie Dowling, 4. Tyron Haynes, 5. Dimitri Pelo, 6. Christian Hazard, 7. Ryley Jacks, 8. Nathaniel Peteru, 9. Kierran Moseley, 10. David Hala, 11. Louie Fanene, 12. Sam Swift, 13. Darren Griffiths (c).
Interchange: 14. Tom Rowles, 15. Ayden Lee, 16. Mitch Sharp, 17. Josh Ailaomai.
* = Gold Coast Titans allocation (? players allocated for this match).
Coach: Jim Lenihan.
- Note: This was Hezron Murgha's 100th game for the Pride.

Position	Round 21 – 2015	P	W	D	L	B	For	Against	Diff	Pts
6	Northern Pride	21	11	0	8	2	399	363	+36	26

ROUND 22: Intrust Super Cup 2015

Saturday
8 August 2015
18:00 AEST (UTC+10)

Mackay Cutters	22 – 26	Northern Pride
Tries: Clune 1 Pereira 1 Jones 1 Taylor 1 Goals: Taylor 2 Rawhiti 1	Half-time: 6 – 14; Penalties: 6 – 8 QRL Report	Tries: 2 Javid Bowen*; 2 Luke George; 1 Sam Obst Goals: 3 Javid Bowen* (3 from 5)

Virgin Australia Stadium
(Bridge Road, South Mackay, QLD)
Referee: v

Sea Swift Northern Pride: 1. Linc Port – FB 2. Javid Bowen* – WG 3. Brett Anderson (co-captain) – CE 4. Semi Tadulala – CE 5. Luke George – WG 6. Ryan Ghietti – FE 7. Sam Obst – HB 8. Jack Svendsen – PR 9. Jason Roos (co-captain) – HK 10. Patrick Kaufusi – PR 11. David Murphy – SR 12. Graham Clark – SR 13. Ben Spina* – LK
Interchange: 14. Keelan White, 15. Tom Hancock, 16. Sheldon Powe-Hobbs, 17. Brent Oosen.
* = Cowboys allocation (3 players allocated for this match).
Unavailable: Regan Verney (fractured eye socket), Sam Pau (broken leg), Cameron King* (knee operation), Vaipuna Tia Kilifi (two match ban for reckless high tackle), Travis Peeters, Denzel King (jaw), Alex Starmer (shoulder).
Pride Out: Hezron Murgha (fullback), Justin Castellaro (centre), Vaipuna Tia Kilifi (second row), Cameron King (bench).
Pride In: Semi Tadulala (centre), Luke George (wing), Keelan White (bench), Brent Oosen (bench).
Changes: Linc Port (wing to fullback), David Murphy (bench to second row).
Mackay Cutters: Mackay Cutters: 1. Sam Clune, 2. Blake Atherton, 3. Ben Jones, 4. Justin Tavae, 5. Buchanan Rawhiti, 6. Cameron Cullen, 7. Liam Taylor, 8. Brad Lupi, 9. Josh Chudleigh, 20. Pulou Vaituutuu, 11. Brenden Treston, 13. Chris Gesch (c), 10. Steve Rapira.
Interchange: 12. Tyson Martin, 15. Joss Boyton, 18. Ryan Kinlyside, 14. Aleki Falepaini, 16. Mitch Day.
* = North Queensland Cowboys allocation (? players allocated for this match)
Coach: Kim Williams.

Position	Round 22 – 2015	P	W	D	L	B	For	Against	Diff	Pts
6	Northern Pride	22	12	0	8	2	425	385	+40	28

ROUND 23: Intrust Super Cup 2015 – Country Week

Sunday
16 August 2015
14:00 AEST (UTC+10)

Redcliffe Dolphins	34 – 26	Northern Pride
Tries: Beehag 2 Johnston 2 Brady 1 Green 1 Goals: Capewell 5 (5 from 6)	Half-time: 10 – 16; Penalties: 7 – 5 QRL Report	Tries: 3 Sam Obst; 1 Linc Port; 1 Jordan Biondi-Odo Goals: 2 Jordan Biondi-Odo; 1 Linc Port

Billy Slater Oval
(Callendar Park, Innisfail, QLD)
Referee: Jarrod Cole

Sea Swift Northern Pride: 1. Hezron Murgha* – FB 2. Linc Port – WG 3. Brett Anderson (co-captain) – CE 4. Justin Castellaro – CE 18. Luke George – WG 6. Ryan Ghietti – FE 7. Sam Obst – HB 8. Jack Svendsen – PR 9. Jason Roos (co-captain) – HK 10. Patrick Kaufusi – PR 11. Tom Hancock – SR 12. Graham Clark – SR 13. Ben Spina* – LK
Interchange: 15. Brent Oosen, 16. Sheldon Powe-Hobbs, 17. David Murphy, 19. Jordan Biondi-Odo.
* = Cowboys allocation (4 players allocated for this match).
Unavailable: Regan Verney (fractured eye socket), Sam Pau (broken leg), Cameron King* (knee operation), Vaipuna Tia Kilifi (two match ban for reckless high tackle), Travis Peeters, Denzel King (jaw), Alex Starmer (shoulder).
Pride Out: Javid Bowen (wing), Semi Tadulala (centre), Keelan White (bench).
Pride In: Hezron Murgha (fullback), Justin Castellaro (centre), Jordan Biondi-Odo (bench).
Changes: Linc Port (fullback to wing), David Murphy (second row to bench), Tom Hancock (bench to second row).
Redcliffe Dolphins: 1. Marlon Doak, 2. Josh Beehag, 3. Tom Opacic, 4. Aaron Whitchurch, 5. Curtis Johnston, 6. John Brady, 7. Luke Capewell (c), 8. Charlie Faingaa, 9. Darcy Etrich, 10. Jon Green, 11. Nick Ritter, 12. Harley Aiono, 13. Tyson Cleal.
Interchange: 14. Shane Pumipi, 15. Joe Bradley, 16. Tom Geraghty 19. Taylor Brown.
* = Brisbane Broncos allocation (? players allocated for this match).
Coach: Troy Lindsay.

Position	Round 23 – 2015	P	W	D	L	B	For	Against	Diff	Pts
6	Northern Pride	23	12	0	9	2	451	419	+32	28

ROUND 24: Intrust Super Cup 2015

Sunday
23 August 2015
14:00 AEST (UTC+10)

Norths Devils	10 – 26	Northern Pride
Tries: Lucas1; Dean 1 Goals: Tyson 1 (1 from 2)	Half-time: 4 – 6 Penalties: 7 – 9 QRL Report	Tries: 2 Linc Port; 1 Justin Castellaro; 1 Sam Obst; 1 Vaipuna Tia Kilifi; 1 Tom Hancock; Goals: 1 Justin Castellaro (1 from 6)

Yusia Ginau Oval
(Bamaga, Cape York, QLD)
Referee: Liam Kennedy

Sea Swift Northern Pride: 1. Linc Port – FB 2. Luke George – WG 3. Brett Anderson (co-captain) – CE 4. Justin Castellaro – CE 22. Javid Bowen* – WG 6. Ryan Ghietti – FE 7. Sam Obst – HB 8. Jack Svendsen – PR 9. Jason Roos (co-captain) – HK 10. Patrick Kaufusi – PR 11. Vaipuna Tia Kilifi – SR 12. Graham Clark – SR 13. Brent Oosen – LK
Interchange: 14. Jordan Biondi-Odo, 15. Tom Hancock, 16. Sheldon Powe-Hobbs, 17. David Murphy.
* = Cowboys allocation (2 players allocated for this match).
Unavailable: Hezron Murgha* (one match ban for lifting tackle), Regan Verney (fractured eye socket), Sam Pau (broken leg), Cameron King* (knee operation), Travis Peeters, Denzel King (jaw), Alex Starmer (shoulder), Ben Spina* (named for the team and then selected to play for the North Queensland Cowboys.
Pride Out: Hezron Murgha (fullback), Ben Spina* (lock).
Pride In: Javid Bowen* (wing), Vaipuna Tia Kilifi (second row).
Changes: Linc Port (wing to fullback), Tom Hancock (second row to bench), Brent Oosen (bench to lock).
Norths Devils: 1. Luke Pollock, 2. Michael Lucas, 3. Joel Bailey, 4. Ryan Millard, 5. Rogan Dean, 6. Dan Murphy, 7. Liam Tyson, 8. Matt Mizzi, 9. Byron Creighton, 10. Billy Solah, 11. Kristian Wanka, 12. Brett Greinke, (c) 13. Krys Freeman.
Interchange: 14. Will McNee, 16. Rhett Webster, 20. Dylan Smith, 17. Josh Afoa.
* = Brisbane Broncos allocation (? players allocated for this match)
Coach: Mark Gliddon.

Position	Round 24 – 2015	P	W	D	L	B	For	Against	Diff	Pts
6	Northern Pride	24	13	0	9	2	477	429	+48	30

ROUND 25: Intrust Super Cup 2015

Saturday
29 August 2015
17:30 AEST (UTC+10)

Northern Pride	46 – 18	CQ Capras
Tries: Linc Port 4 Luke George 2 Vaipuna Tia Kilifi 1 Tom Hancock 1 Jordan Biondi-Odo 1 Goals: Javid Bowen* 5 (5 from 9)	Half-time: 42 – 6 Penalties: 5 – 4 QRL Report	Tries: 1 Ainsworth; 1 Randall; 1 Smith Goals: 2 Allen; 1 Webster

Barlow Park
(Severin Street, Parramatta Park, QLD)
Referee: Jarrod Cole

Sea Swift Northern Pride: 1. Linc Port – FB 5. Luke George – WG 3. Brett Anderson (co-captain) – CE 4. Javid Bowen* – CE 22. Semi Tadulala – WG 20. Ryan Ghietti – FE 7. Sam Obst – HB 14. Jordon Biondi-Odo – PR 9. Jason Roos (co-captain) – HK 10. Patrick Kaufusi – PR 11. Vaipuna Tia Kilifi – SR 12. Graham Clark – SR 13. Tom Hancock – LK
Interchange: 15. Brent Oosen, 16. Sheldon Powe-Hobbs, 17. David Murphy, 18. Keelan White.
* = Cowboys allocation (2 players allocated for this match).
Unavailable: Regan Verney (fractured eye socket), Sam Pau (broken leg), Cameron King* (knee operation), Travis Peeters, Denzel King (jaw), Alex Starmer (shoulder).
Pride Out: Justin Castellaro (centre), Jack Svendsen (front row).
Pride In: Semi Tadulala (wing), Keelan White (bench).
Changes: Javid Bowen (wing to centre), Jason Roos (hooker to front row), Patrick Kaufusi (front row to hooker), Vaipuna Tia Kilifi (second row to front row), Brent Oosen (lock to bench), Jordan Biondi-Odo (bench to lock), Tom Hancock (bench to second row)
CQ Capras: 1. Reece Baker, 2. Jake Ainsworth, 3. Dan Randall, 4. Sam Smith, 5. Tarrant Mariner, 6. Matt Minto, 7. Mark Johnstone, 8. Gerard Tema, 9. Ian Webster, 10. Gavin Hiscox, 11. Tyson White, 12. Rajan Opetaia-Halls, 13. Guy Williams (c).
Interchange: 14. Corbyn Kilday, 15. Nathan Young, 16. Josh Johnston, 17. Josh Mitchell, 18. Dean Allen.
* = Brisbane Broncos allocation (? players allocated for this match).
Coach: Lionel Harbin.

Position	Round 25 – 2015	P	W	D	L	B	For	Against	Diff	Pts
6	Northern Pride	25	14	0	9	2	523	447	+76	32

=== 2015 ladder ===
	Team	Pld	W	D	L	B	PF	PA	PD	Pts
1	Townsville Blackhawks	25	19	3	1	2	870	363	+507	43
2	Papua New Guinea Hunters	25	18	3	2	2	718	487	+231	42
3	Ipswich Jets	25	16	7	0	2	700	502	+198	36
4	Wynnum Manly Seagulls	25	16	7	0	2	623	440	+183	36'
5	Easts Tigers	25	13	8	2	2	632	428	+204	32
6	Northern Pride	25	14	9	0	2	523	447	+76	32
7	Redcliffe Dolphins	25	10	12	1	2	671	574	+97	25
8	Mackay Cutters	25	10	12	1	2	547	497	+50	25
9	Burleigh Bears	25	10	13	0	2	401	674	-273	24
10	Tweed Heads Seagulls	25	9	13	1	2	510	585	-75	23
11	Sunshine Coast Falcons	25	7	15	1	2	452	599	-147	19
12	Souths Logan Magpies	25	7	15	1	2	506	664	-158	19
13	Norths Devils	25	5	16	2	2	420	727	-324	16
14	Central Queensland Capras	25	1	22	0	2	330	882	-552	6

==== Northern Pride (regular season 2015) ====
- Win = 14 (9 of 11 home games, 5 of 12 away games)
- Loss = 9 (2 of 11 home games, 7 of 12 away games)

Round	1	2	3	4	5	6	7	8	9	10	11	12	13	14	15	16	17	18	19	20	21	22	23	24	25	26
Result	L	P	L	L	L	W	W	W	W	L	B	W	L	W	W	L	W	W	L	W	B	W	W	L	W	W
Ground	A	P	H	A	A	H	H	H	H	A	B	A	H	H	A	A	H	H	A	A	B	H	A	A	A	H

Source: https://web.archive.org/web/20120916041305/http://www.qrl.com.au/
A = Away; H = Home; B = Bye; W = Win; D = Draw; L = Loss; P = Postpone

== Finals Series ==
The Queensland Cup reverted to a six-team finals format in 2015.

Elimination Finals
3	Ipswich	54
6	Northern Pride	26
4	Wynnum Manly	24
5	Easts	32

Major / Minor Semi-finals
1	Townsville	26
2	PNG Hunters	12
3	Ipswich	44
5	Easts	18

Preliminary Final
2	PNG Hunters	12
3	Ipswich	28

Grand Final
1	Townsville	20
3	Ipswich	32

Finals Week 1 – First Elimination Semi-final

Sunday
6 September 2015
13:35 AEST (UTC+10)

Ipswich Jets	54 – 26	Northern Pride
Tries: Carlin Anderson 2 Matt Parcell 2 Marmin Barba 1 Josh Cleeland 1 Dane Phillips 1 Keiron Lander 1 Billy McConnachie 1 Goals: Carlin Anderson 9	Half-time: 24 – 16; Penalties: 2 – 6	Tries: 3 Brett Anderson; 1 Javid Bowen*; 1 Ben Spina* Goals: 3 Justin Castellaro (3 from 5)

North Ipswich Reserve
(Ipswich, QLD)
Referee: Peter Gough.

Sea Swift Northern Pride: 1. Linc Port – FB 2. Hezron Murgha* – WG 3. Brett Anderson (c) – CE 4. Justin Castellaro – CE 18. Javid Bowen* – WG 20. Ryan Ghietti – FE

7. Sam Obst – HB 8. Jack Svendsen – PR 9. Jason Roos (c) – HK 10. Patrick Kaufusi – PR 11. Vaipuna Tia Kilifi – SR 12. Graham Clark – SR 13. Tom Hancock – LK

Interchange: 14. Jordon Biondi-Odo, 16. Sheldon Powe-Hobbs, 17. David Murphy, 22. Ben Spina*.
* = Cowboys allocation (4 players allocated for this match)
Unavailable: Regan Verney (fractured eye socket), Sam Pau (broken leg), Cameron King* (knee operation), Travis Peeters, Denzel King (jaw), Alex Starmer (shoulder).
Pride Out: Semi Tadulala (wing), Luke George (wing), Brent Oosen (bench), Keelan White (bench)
Pride In: Hezron Murgha (wing), Justin Castellaro (centre), Jack Svendsen (front row), Ben Spina* (bench)
Changes: Javid Bowen (centre to wing), Jason Roos (front row to hooker), Patrick Kaufusi (hooker to front row), Vaipuna Tia Kilifi (front row to second row), Tom Hancock (second row to lock), Jordan Biondi-Odo (lock to bench)
Ipswich Jets: 1. Carlin Anderson, 2. Marmin Barba, 3. Richard Pandia, 4. Nemani Valekapa, 5. Brendon McGrady, 6. Josh Cleeland, 7. Dane Phillips, 8. Josh Seage, 9. Matt Parcell, 10. Rod Griffin, 11. Fakahoko Teutau, 12. Kurt Capewell, 13. Keiron Lander (c).
Interchange: 15. Kurtis Lingwoodock, 16. Billy McConnachie, 17. Liam Capewell, 22. Sam Martin.
Coach: Ben Walker and Shane Walker
* = Brisbane Broncos allocation (x players allocated for this match)
- Note: First Elimination Semi-final: 3rd place Ipswich Jets v 6th place Pride.
  This match was broadcast live on Channel 9 with Matthew Thompson, Scott Sattler and Peter Psaltis as the commentary team.

== 2015 Northern Pride players ==
Pride player	Appearances	Tries	Goals	Field goals	Pts
Alex Starmer	5	0	0	0	0
Bradley Stephen	2	3	0	0	12
Brent Oosen	6	0	0	0	0
Brett Anderson	16	8	0	0	32
Codey Kennedy	1	0	0	0	0
Dave Murphy	22	1	0	0	4
Dean McGilvray	4	1	0	0	4
Denzel King	2	0	0	0	0
Graham Clark	22	3	0	0	12
Jack Svendsen	22	1	0	0	4
Jason Roos	24	1	0	0	4
Jordon Biondi-Odo	6	2	4	0	16
Justin Castellaro	8	3	15	0	42
Keelan White	4	1	0	0	4
Linc Port	24	23	11	0	114
Luke George	18	16	0	0	64
Nathan Wales	2	0	0	0	0
PJ Webb	2	0	0	0	0
Patrick Kaufusi	21	2	0	0	8
Regan Verney	4	0	0	0	0
Ryan Ghietti	24	1	0	1	5
Sam Obst	24	8	0	0	32
Semi Tadulala	12	3	0	0	12
Sheldon Powe-Hobbs	24	0	0	0	0
Tom Hancock	24	4	0	0	16
Vaipuna Tia-Kilifi	18	8	0	0	32

=== North Queensland Cowboys who played for the Pride in 2015 ===
Cowboys player	Appearances	Tries	Goals	Field goals	Pts
Ben Spina*	15	3	0	0	12
Cameron King*	16	1	7	0	18
Hezron Murgha*	19	3	10	0	32
Javid Bowen*	15	10	13	0	66
Lachlan Coote*	1	0	0	0	0
Scott Bolton*	1	0	0	0	0

== 2015 Televised Games ==
=== Channel Nine ===
In August 2012 as part of the historic $1 billion five-year broadcasting agreement with Nine and Fox Sports, the Australian Rugby League Commission confirmed that Intrust Super Cup matches would be televised by Channel 9 until 2018. One match a week is shown live across Queensland at 2.00pm (AEST) on Sunday afternoons on Channel 9 (or GEM), on WIN Television (RTQ) in regional areas and on Imparja Television in remote areas. The match is also broadcast in Papua New Guinea on Kundu 2 TV. The 2015 commentary team was Peter Psaltis, Scott Sattler and Mathew Thompson.

In 2015 the Pride appeared in three televised games:

- Round 1: Northern Pride lost to Easts Tigers 20-12 at Tap Out Energy Stadium, Stones Corner, Brisbane. This match was shown on the Nine Network's GEM channel because the ICC World Cup Cricket match between Australia and Sri Lanka was on Channel Nine.
- Round 8: Northern Pride beat Souths Logan Magpies 36-18 (Played at 12.30 pm, telecast delayed to 1.30 pm) from Barlow Park, Cairns. This Round was originally scheduled as the Wynnum Manly Seagulls v Norths Devils game.
- First Elimination Semi-final: Northern Pride lost to Ipswich Jets 54-26 at North Ipswich Reserve, Ipswich.

The Round 3 match against the Townsville Blackhawks from Barlow Park, Cairns was scheduled to be broadcast, but Channel Nine was concerned about the impacts of Cyclone Nathan and so the match between Tweed Heads Seagulls and Norths Devils was shown instead.
