= 2014 PNG Hunters season =

- Queensland Cup rank: 6th

Team information
- CEO: Brad Tassell
- Coach: Michael Marum
- Captain: Israel Eliab
- Stadium: Kalabond Oval
2015 →

The 2014 Intrust Super Cup was the PNG Hunters first season in the Queensland Cup.

== Season summary ==
On 12 December 2013 head coach Michael Marum announced a 25-man squad for the Hunters' inaugural season. included were Israel Eliab, Roger Laka, Enoch Maki, Mark Mexico, Joe Bruno and Sebastian Pandia who were all members of the Kumuls squad that competed at the 2013 Rugby League World Cup. The squad was impacted when Mark Mexico signed with the Cronulla Sharks in Australia.

The Hunters won their debut match away at Redcliffe Dolphins 24-18 with captain Israel Eliab scoring the club's first ever try, and by the end of the season having lost only twice at home, missed out on the end of season play-offs by just 1 point finishing 6th. Garry Lo finished as the competition's leading try scorer with 24, while Roger Laka was ever present. The club used only 23 players during the whole season.

=== 2014 squad ===
PNG Hunters
First team squad		Coaching staff
Adex Wera – FB, WG; Garry Lo – WG; Thompson Teteh – CE; Israel Eliab – CE; George Benson – WG; Noel Zeming – SO; Roger Laka – HB; Enoch Maki – PR; Wartovo Puara – HK; Willie Minoga – PR; Sebastian Pandia – SR; Lawrence Tu'u – SR	Mark Mexico – SR; Noel Joel – PR; Timothy Lomai – PR; Brandy Peter – SO; Adam Korave – WG; Edward Goma – SR; Dion Aiye – HB; Esau Siune – PR; David Loko – LK; Jason Tali – CE; Joe Bruno – SR	Head coach: Michael Marum; Assistant coaches: Nigel Hukula; Solomon Kuliniasi; Legend: (c) Captain(s); (vc) Vice-captain(s); Updated: 12 December 2013; Source(s):

== Squad movement ==
=== Losses ===
Player	Signed to	Until end of	Notes
Mark Mexico	Cronulla Sharks	2014	
Jason Tali	Gateshead Thunder	2015	
Garry Lo	Gateshead Thunder	2015	
