= Wilf George =

Trinidadian rugby league footballer

Personal information
- Full name: Wilfred George
- Born: 24 January 1960 (age 65) Trinidad and Tobago

Playing information
- Position: Wing
Club
Years	Team	Pld	T	G	FG	P
1981–85	Huddersfield	73	32	0	0	110
1985–86	Widnes	22	6	0	0	24
1986–91	Halifax	138+3	75	0	0	300
1992	Batley	5	1	0	0	4
	Total	241	114	0	0	438
- Relatives: Luke George (son)

Wilfred "Wilf" George (born 24 January 1960) is a former professional rugby league footballer who played in the 1980s and 1990s. He played at club level for Huddersfield, Widnes, Halifax, and Batley, as a wing.

== Playing career ==
=== Early career ===
George was born in Trinidad and Tobago, and was raised in Huddersfield. He made his debut for Huddersfield in April 1981. He was signed by Widnes in 1985 for a fee of around £18,500.

=== Halifax ===
George was signed by Halifax in February 1986 for a fee of £13,000. He played 10 games for Halifax in the remainder of the 1985–86 season, scoring two tries, the second being in the last League game of the season against Featherstone Rovers on Sunday 20 April 1986, when a 13-13 draw at Thrum Hall clinched the Championship.

George played left wing and scored the first try of the match in Halifax's 19-18 victory over St. Helens in the 1987 Challenge Cup Final during the 1986–87 season at Wembley Stadium, London on Saturday 2 May 1987.

George played left wing in Halifax's 12-24 defeat by Wigan in the 1989–90 Regal Trophy Final during the 1989–90 season at Headingley, Leeds on Saturday 13 January 1990.

== Post-playing career ==
After retiring from playing, George became a referee at amateur level. He has been a member of the Rugby Football League's disciplinary committee since 1997.

== Personal life ==
Wilf George is the father of the rugby league footballers; Marcus George, and Luke George.
