= Patrick Kaufusi =

Tonga international rugby league footballer

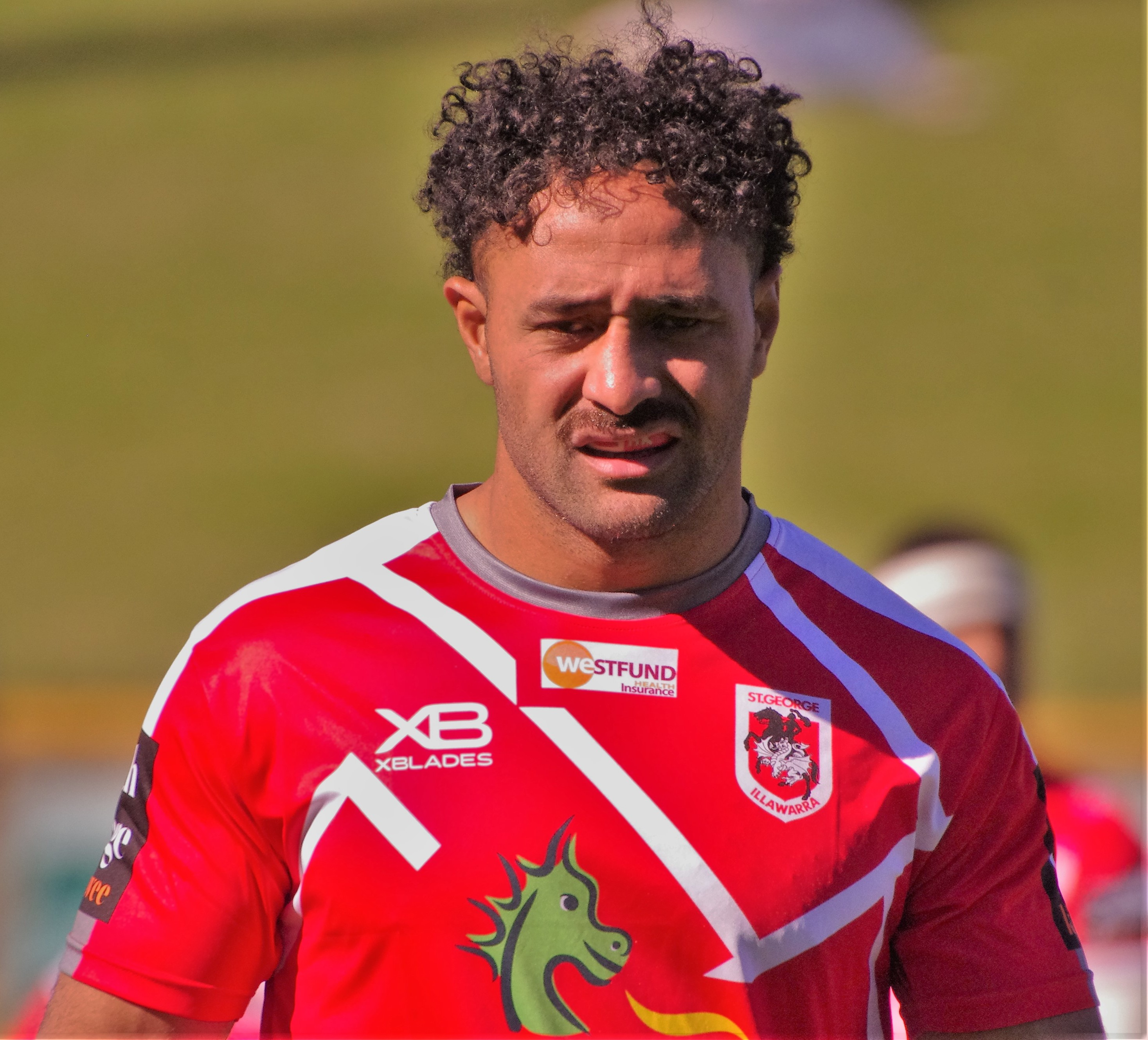

Personal information
- Born: 18 February 1994 (age 32) Auckland, New Zealand
- Height: 188 cm (6 ft 2 in)
- Weight: 103 kg (16 st 3 lb)

Playing information
- Position: Prop
Club
Years	Team	Pld	T	G	FG	P
2015–17	North Qld Cowboys	22	0	0	0	0
2018–19	Melbourne Storm	3	0	0	0	0
2019	St. George Illawarra	6	0	0	0	0
	Total	31	0	0	0	0
Representative
Years	Team	Pld	T	G	FG	P
2015–18	Queensland Residents	2	0	0	0	0
2016–17	Tonga	2	0	0	0	0
- Source: As of 6 January 2024
- Education: Shalom Catholic College, Bundaberg
- Relatives: Antonio Kaufusi (brother); Felise Kaufusi (brother)

Patrick Kaufusi (born 18 February 1994) is a former Tonga international rugby league footballer who last played as a prop for the Townsville Blackhawks in the Intrust Super Cup.

He previously played for the North Queensland Cowboys, Melbourne Storm and the St George Illawarra Dragons in the NRL.

== Background ==
Kaufusi was born in Auckland, New Zealand, and is of Tongan descent. He moved to Australia at a young age and was educated at Shalom Catholic College, Bundaberg.

Patrick played his junior rugby league for the Bundaberg Brothers, before being signed by the North Queensland Cowboys.

== Early career ==
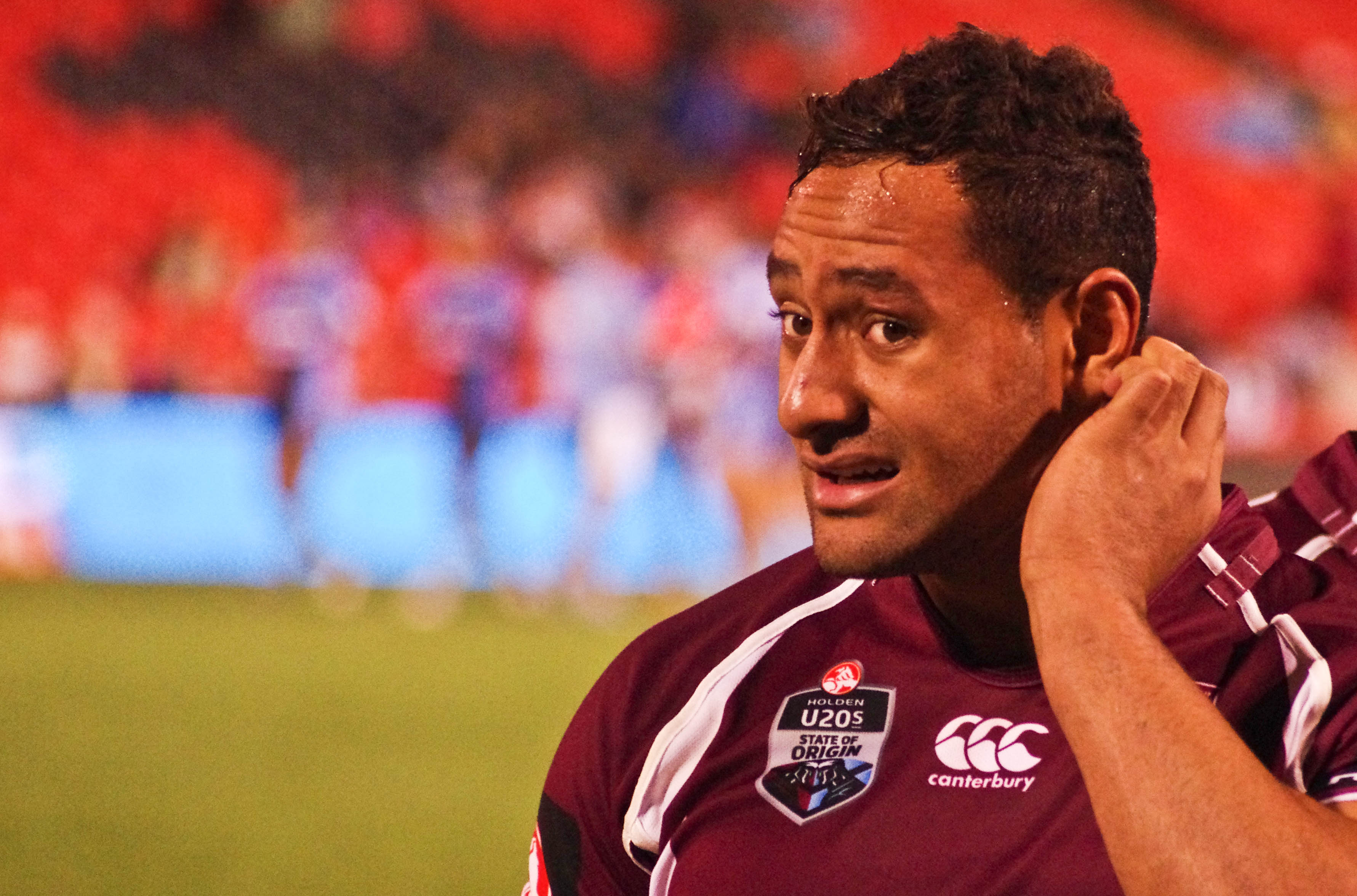
Kaufusi playing for the Queensland Under 20s side in 2013

From 2012 to 2014, Kaufusi played for the North Queensland Cowboys' NYC team. On 20 April 2013, he played for the Queensland Under-20s team against the New South Wales Under-20s team. On 3 October 2013, he re-signed with the Cowboys on a 3-year contract. In September 2014, Kaufusi was named in the Junior Kangaroos train-on squad.

In 2015, he moved on to the Cowboys' Queensland Cup team, Northern Pride RLFC.

== Playing career ==
=== 2015 ===
In Round 16 of the 2015 NRL season, Kaufusi made his NRL debut for the Cowboys against the Cronulla-Sutherland Sharks.

=== 2016 ===
In Round 7 of the 2016 NRL season, Kaufusi played his second NRL game, coming off the bench in the Cowboys' 44-18 win over the South Sydney Rabbitohs. On 7 May, he made his international debut for Tonga against Samoa in the 2016 Polynesian Cup.

Kaufusi played 12 games for the Cowboys in 2016, coming off the interchange bench in all 12.

=== 2017 ===
Kaufusi started the 2017 NRL season coming off the bench for the Cowboys. After starting prop and co-captain Matthew Scott tore his anterior cruciate ligament (ACL) in Round 2, Kaufusi moved into the starting line-up for the first time. In Round 3, he started his first NRL game, a 30-8 loss to the Manly Sea Eagles. On 6 May, he represented Tonga in the 2017 Pacific Test against Fiji. He broke his foot in the fixture, which ruled him out for the rest of the season.

On 1 September, Melbourne Storm head coach Craig Bellamy confirmed that Kaufusi would join the club in 2018.

=== 2018 ===
In Round 16 of the 2018 NRL season, Kaufusi made his Melbourne Storm debut against the Sydney Roosters at Adelaide Oval. Patrick became the third Kaufusi to play for the Melbourne Storm, after his brothers Antonio and Felise.

=== 2019 ===
Kaufusi made a total of 6 appearances for St George in the 2019 NRL season as the club finished second last on the table. In November 2019, it was announced that Kaufusi had been released by the club.

=== 2020-21 ===
On 6 February, Kaufusi signed a one-year deal with the Townsville Blackhawks. On 19 February, the Blackhawks announced that Kaufusi had ruptured his achilles tendon in training, ruling him out for five to six months. In March 2021, Kaufusi finally played his first game for Townsville.

=== 2024 ===
On 21 October 2024, Kaufusi announced his retirement from rugby league.

== Statistics ==
=== NRL ===
Season	Team	Matches	T	G	GK %	F/G	Pts
2015	North Queensland	1	0	0	–	0	0
2016	North Queensland	12	0	0	–	0	0
2017	North Queensland	9	0	0	–	0	0
2018	Melbourne	2	0	0	–	0	0
2019	Melbourne	1	0	0	–	0	0
2019	St George Illawarra	6	0	0	–	0	0
Career totals		31	0	0	—	0	0

=== International ===
Season	Team	Matches	T	G	GK %	F/G	Pts
2016	Tonga	1	0	0	—	0	0
2017	Tonga	1	0	0	—	0	0
Career totals		2	0	0	—	0	0

== Personal life ==
Kaufusi is the younger brother of former Australian and Queensland representative Antonio and current Dolphins (NRL) player Felise.
