= Timothy Lomai =

PNG international rugby league footballer

Personal information
- Born: 16 September 1992 (age 32); Papua New Guinea

Playing information
- Position: Second-row, Lock
Club
Years	Team	Pld	T	G	FG	P
2015–16	PNG Hunters	32	3	0	0	12
Representative
Years	Team	Pld	T	G	FG	P
2014	PNG Prime Minister's XIII	1	0	0	0	0
2014–16	Papua New Guinea	2	0	0	0	0
- As of 10 November 2023

Timothy Lomai is a former professional rugby league footballer who played for the PNG Hunters in the Queensland Cup and has represented Papua New Guinea Kumuls during the Pacific Rugby League International Test. He played for east tigers in Queensland cup. He’s also a PNG kickboxing champion and had a few professional fight representing Papua New Guinea, both locally and abroad. He's now currently signed with Hay Magpies RFL in NSW group 20 league. He had coached Magpies for a season and also and currently residing in Hay shire.
