= Luke George =

English rugby league footballer

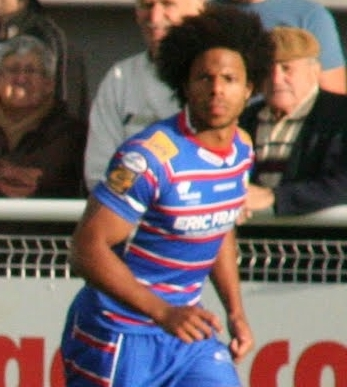

Personal information
- Full name: Luke George
- Born: 30 October 1987 (age 38) Huddersfield, England
- Height: 6 ft 1 in (1.85 m)
- Weight: 14 st 13 lb (95 kg)

Playing information
- Position: Wing, Centre, Second-row
Club
Years	Team	Pld	T	G	FG	P
2007–11	Wakefield Trinity Wildcats	44	25	0	0	100
2012–13	Huddersfield Giants	32	20	0	0	80
2013(loan)	→ Hull Kingston Rovers	4	2	0	0	8
2014	Bradford Bulls	12	4	0	0	16
	Total	92	51	0	0	204
- Source: As of 15 September 2014
- Father: Wilf George

Luke George (born 30 October 1987) is an English professional rugby league footballer who plays for the Central Queensland Capras in the Queensland Cup. Luke George's usual position is centre and he can play on the wing.

== Huddersfield Giants ==
Luke is already popular at Huddersfield. On his home début in his hometown, he scored a hat-trick resulting in the Giants merchandise teams selling 'Luke George wigs'.

== Bradford Bulls ==
Mid-way through the 2013 season the Bradford Bulls announced that they had signed George for the 2014 and 2015 seasons by signing him on a 2 Year Deal.

2014

George missed the pre-season games against Hull FC, Dewsbury Rams and Castleford Tigers due to injury.

He missed Round 1 due to injury. He featured in Round 2 (Wakefield Trinity Wildcats) to Round 3 (London Broncos). George was injured for Round 4. He featured in Round 5 (Huddersfield Giants). Luke was injured for Round 6–7. Luke featured in Round 12 (St. Helens) to Round 13 (Huddersfield Giants) then in Round 15 (Wakefield Trinity Wildcats) to Round 17 (Hull Kingston Rovers). Luke featured in Round 21 (Huddersfield Giants) then in Round 25 (Castleford Tigers). George played in Round 5 (Catalans Dragons) to the Quarter Final (Warrington Wolves) of the Challenge Cup. He scored against Wakefield Trinity Wildcats (1 try), Warrington Wolves (1 try) and Huddersfield Giants (2 tries).

Season	Appearances	Tries	Goals	F/G	Points
2014 Bradford Bulls	12	4	0	0	16
Total	12	4	0	0	16

== Genealogical Information ==
Luke George is the son of the rugby league footballer Wilf George, and the younger brother of the rugby league footballer Marcus George. He is of Trinidadian descent through his father.
