= Mark Mexico =

PNG international rugby league footballer

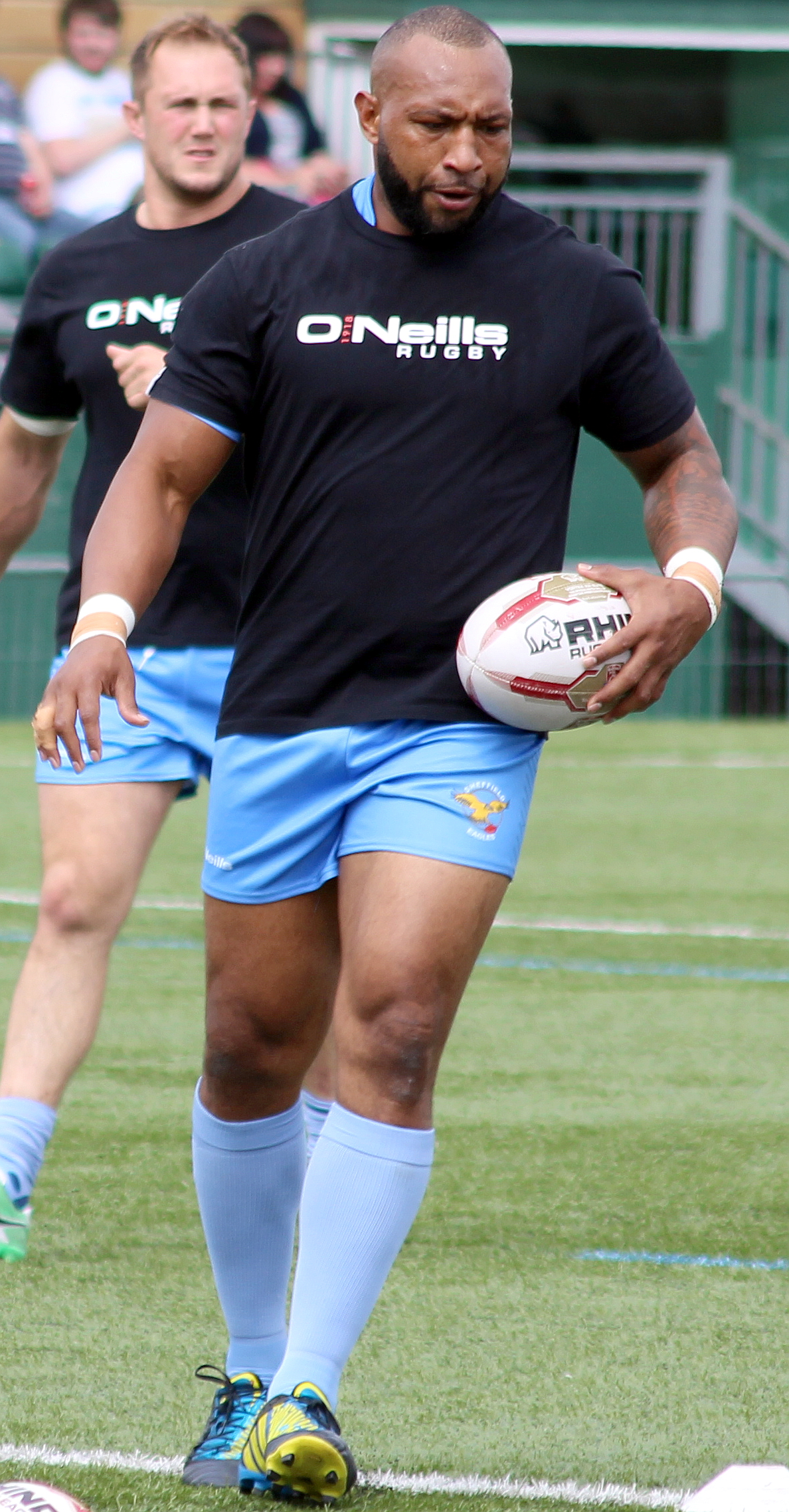

Personal information
- Born: 21 May 1989 (age 37) Lae, Papua New Guinea
- Height: 183 cm (6 ft 0 in)
- Weight: 106 kg (16 st 10 lb)

Playing information
- Position: Prop
Club
| Years | Team | Pld | T | G | FG | P |
|---|---|---|---|---|---|---|
| 2015–16 | Newcastle Thunder | 17 | 2 | 0 | 0 | 8 |
| 2016–17 | Sheffield Eagles | 58 | 6 | 0 | 0 | 28 |
| | Total | 75 | 8 | 0 | 0 | 36 |
Representative
| Years | Team | Pld | T | G | FG | P |
| 2012–14 | PNG Prime Minister's XIII | 3 | 0 | 0 | 0 | 0 |
| 2013–14 | Papua New Guinea | 4 | 0 | 0 | 0 | 0 |
- Source: As of 9 November 2023

Mark Mexico (born 21 May 1989) is a Papua New Guinean professional rugby league footballer who last played for the Sheffield Eagles in the Kingstone Press Championship as a prop forward.

== Playing career ==
=== Early career ===
Born in Lae, Papua New Guinea, Mexico played his junior football for Lae school Boys(Bungandi secondary school), local team Kamkumung Crushers before joining Intercity team the Lae Bombers, Enga Mioks, Master Mark City Rangers, Snax Tigers and Rabaul Gurias in the Papua New Guinea National Rugby League.

In 2013, Mexico had a short stint with Redcliffe Dolphins in the Intrust Super Cup. Afterwards, in 2014 Mexico joined the Papua New Guinea Hunters for their inaugural season in the Queensland Cup.

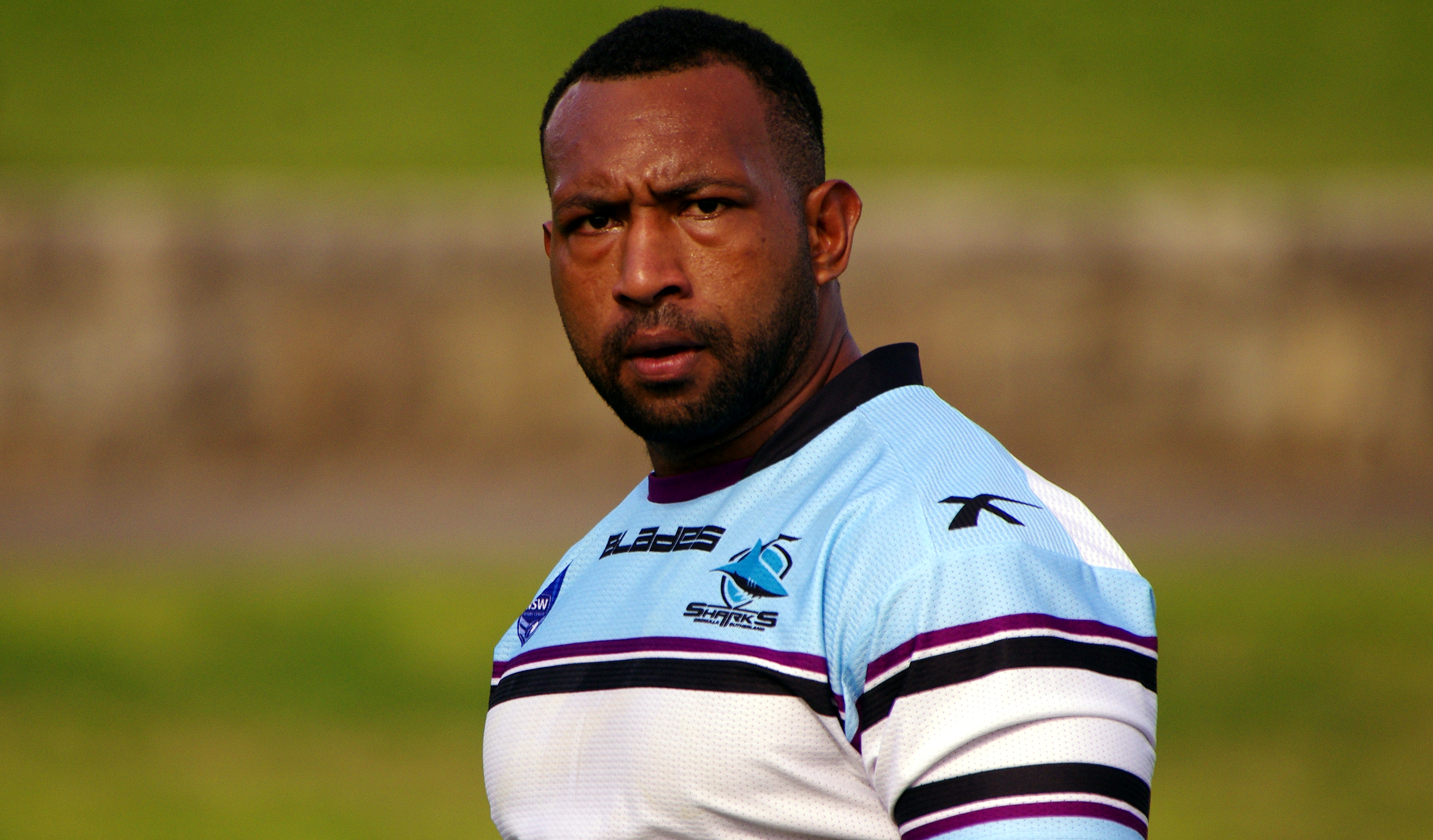
Mexico playing for the Cronulla-Sutherland Sharks

=== New South Wales Cup ===
In April 2014, after being strongly linked with the Manly-Warringah Sea Eagles, Mexico signed a 1-year contract with the Cronulla-Sutherland Sharks effective immediately.

=== Newcastle Thunder ===
In 2015, Mexico made the switch to Newcastle Thunder in the English League 1.

=== Sheffield Eagles ===
After playing a total of 17 games, scoring twice, the Papua New Guinean went on to sign a two-year contract with Sheffield Eagles in the league above. Mexico is very popular with the Eagles fans and is currently in the second year of the two, with more than 50 games played and 7 tries under his belt. In the 2017 Championship Shield, Mexico was ruled out of an away game in France at Toulouse XIII because of a 'passport irregularity'. In November 2017 it was announced that Mexico would not be signing a renewed contract with the Eagles for the 2018 season.

=== Representative career ===
In 2005, Mexico played for the PNGRFL Junior Kumuls, School Boys Rugby League World Cup in Moscow at under-16 level. Two years later, Mexico played for the PNGRFL Resident Kumuls against Cairns Northern Pride and then Test Match against Toa Samoa. The next year, Mexico was selected to train in the squad for the PNGRFL Kumuls, in preparation for the Rugby League World Cup in Australia.

In 2010, Mexico was selected to train with the PNGRFL Kumuls squad for the Four Nations, again in Australia. Having played a year for the Emerging Kumuls, in 2012 Mexico played for the PNGRFL Kumuls against Fiji. He also played for the PNGRFL Prime Ministers XIII against the Australia Prime Minister's XIII. He played in this game in 2014 as well. In 2013, Mexico played for the PNGRFL Residents Kumuls against the South Sydney Rabbitohs. He also played for the PNGRFL Prime Minister's XIII against the Australia Prime Minister's XIII.

In October 2013, Mexico was selected in the Papua New Guinean squad for the 2013 Rugby League World Cup, this time in England. Mexico was noted for his hard and aggressive style of play in his three games during this World Cup, but made no contribution to the scoring in any of the games.
