= List of storms named Nathan =

The name Nathan has been used for two tropical cyclones in the Western Pacific Ocean and two in the Australian region.

Western Pacific Ocean:

- Tropical Storm Nathan (1990) (T9004, 05W, Akang), entered the China Sea
- Tropical Storm Nathan (1993) (T9306, 10W), crossed Japan

Australian region:

- Cyclone Nathan (1998), approached the Queensland coast
- Cyclone Nathan (2015), hit the Arnhem Land
