= Nickson Borana =

Papua New Guinean rugby league footballer

Personal information
- Full name: Nickson Borana Ugaia
- Born: 30 January 1996 (age 29); Lae, Morobe Province, Papua New Guinea
- Height: 1.81 m (5 ft 11 in)
- Weight: 96 kg (15 st 2 lb)

Playing information
- Position: Second-row
Club
Years	Team	Pld	T	G	FG	P
2018	Villeneuve XIII RLLG	18	8	0	0	32

Nickson Borana (born 30 January 1996) is a Papua New Guinean rugby league player who plays for Villeneuve XIII RLLG in the Elite One Championship He plays as a second-row.

== Career ==
Borana previously played for the Papua New Guinea Hunters in the Queensland Cup.
