= Nathaniel Bowman =

American settler (1608–1682)

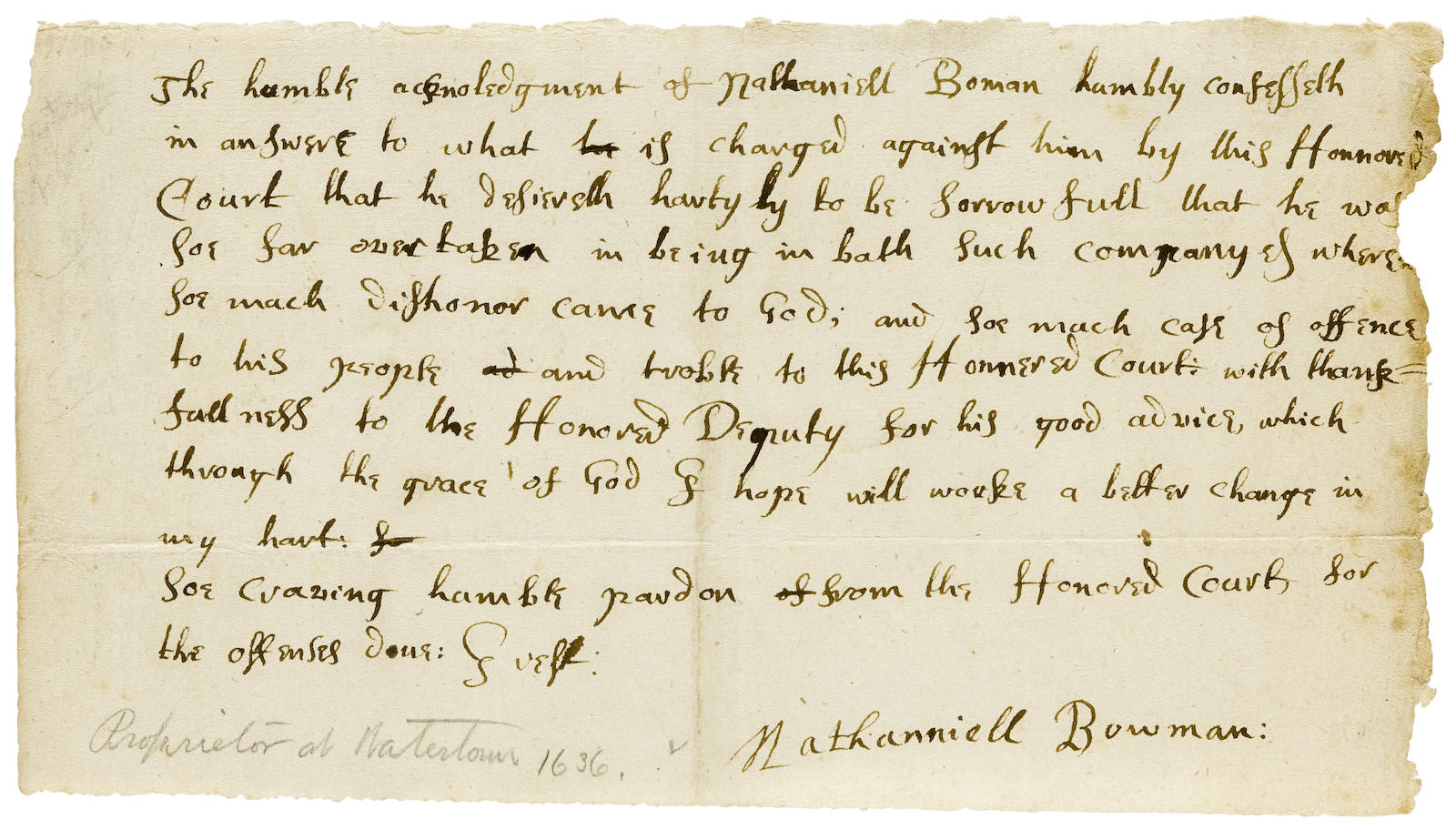
- Born: 1608; Leek, England
- Died: January 26, 1682 (aged 73–74); Cambridge Farms Parish
- Spouse: Anne Beresford
- Children: Francis Bowman
- Parent(s): John Bowman, Ann Beresford

Nathaniel Bowman (1608–1682) was the first Bowman immigrant to be among the earliest settlers of the Massachusetts Bay Colony. He had the rank of gentlemen in the public records, indicating that he came from some distinguished English stock. On October 19, 1630, he applied to the general court, but his name doesn't appear on the list of applicants granted the oath of Freeman. He was one of the original proprietors of Watertown, Massachusetts. Around 1650, he removed to the Parish of Cambridge Farms (Lexington) where many of his descendants have lived.

== See also ==
- Thirteen Colonies
- Richard Saltonstall (1586–1661), led the settlement of Watertown in 1630
- New England Confederation (1643–1684)
- New World
