= Cameron King =

Australian rugby league footballer

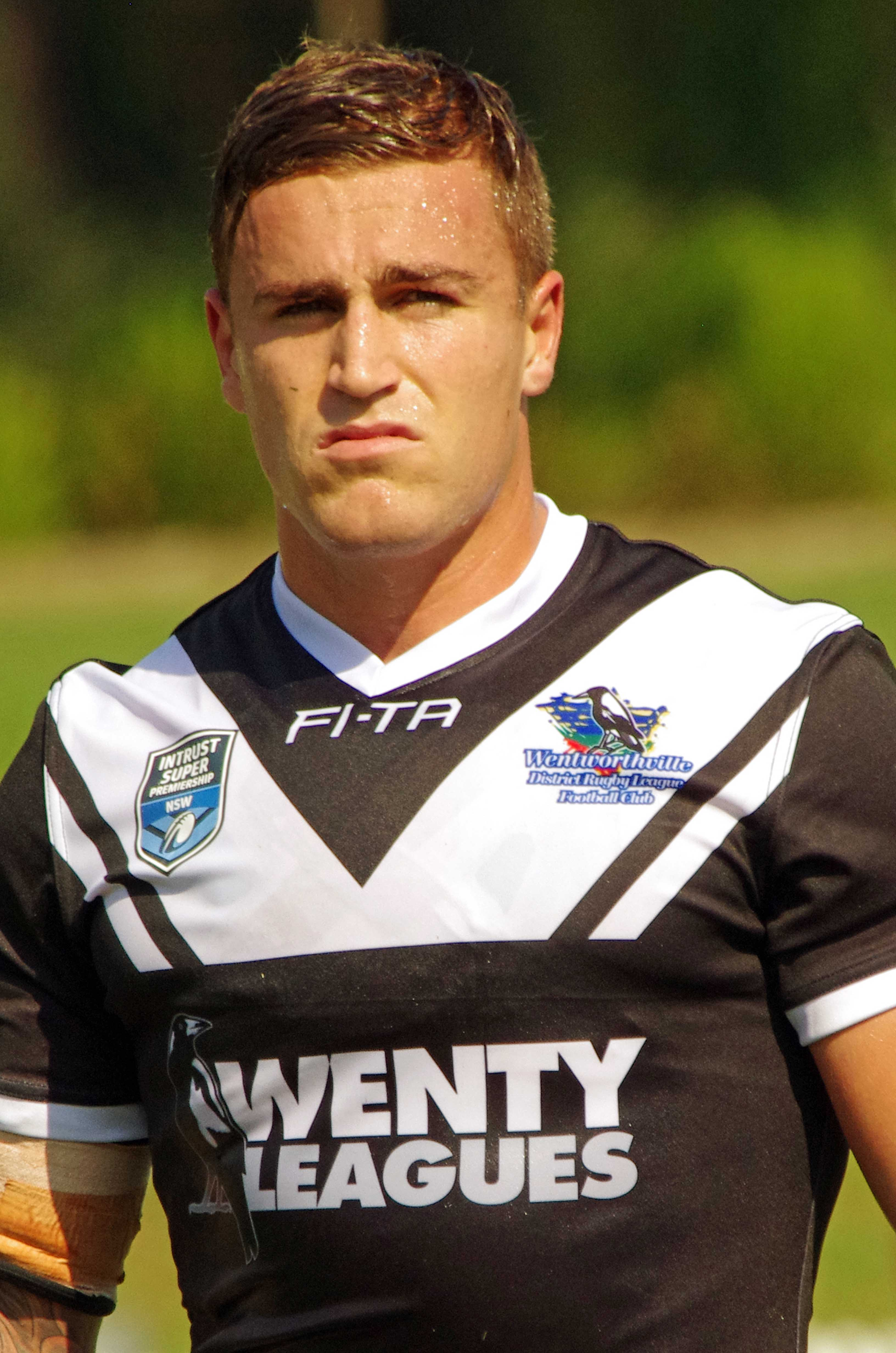

Personal information
- Born: 17 September 1991 (age 35) Wagga Wagga, New South Wales, Australia
- Height: 178 cm (5 ft 10 in)
- Weight: 90 kg (14 st 2 lb)

Playing information
- Position: Hooker
Club
Years	Team	Pld	T	G	FG	P
2010–13	St. George Illawarra	17	0	1	0	2
2014–15	North Qld Cowboys	4	0	0	0	0
2016–18	Parramatta Eels	22	0	0	0	0
2019	Featherstone Rovers	28	18	3	0	78
	Total	71	18	4	0	80
- Source: As of 9 March 2021
- Relatives: Greg Alexander (brother-in-law)

Cameron King (born 17 September 1991) is an Australian former professional rugby league footballer who played as a hooker in the 2010s.

He made his debut for the St. George Illawarra Dragons in the NRL in 2010 with whom he won the 2011 World Club Challenge. He also played for the North Queensland Cowboys and the Parramatta Eels as well as Featherstone Rovers in the Betfred Championship.

== Background ==
King was born in Wagga Wagga, New South Wales, Australia.

== Early life ==
King's junior rugby league football clubs were the Wagga Kangaroos, Queanbeyan Blues and Hurstville United.

After moving to Sydney in 2005, he began playing in the St. George Junior Rugby League Football Competition for Hurstville United Junior Rugby League Football Club.

He attended and graduated from Endeavour Sports High School in Taren Point, New South Wales, where he captained the senior team and received the Endeavour Sports High School 'Player of the Year Award' in 2009.

== Playing career ==
=== 2008 ===
King was a member of the St. George Dragons S. G. Ball Cup team in 2008. He debuted in round 1 against Parramatta Eels at Cabramatta Sports Ground on 16 February 2008.

King's form resulted in him becoming a member of the St. George Illawarra Dragons under-20's Toyota Cup team in 2008. He debuted in round 19 against Melbourne Storm at Olympic Park Stadium on 21 July 2008.

=== 2009 ===
While attending Endeavour Sports High School in 2009 and playing for them in ARL Schoolboy Cup, King captained the Australian Schoolboys team which beat the Great Britain Community Lions team on two occasions with the scores of 66–0 and 66–18. King was named the most valuable player in each match and went on to win "Man of the Series" as well as the Great Britain Community Lions coaches award.

That same year he also captained the New South Wales under-18s side which beat Queensland's under-18s 26–6. In an interview with The Leader after winning, he said that he, "actually learnt to hate Queensland."

In July, he represented NSWCHS (NSW Combined High Schools) in the under-18's division. He won the 'man of the match' in one game and was named MVP for the series.

In December, he won the Val Lembit Memorial Trophy for the most outstanding sportsman in NSW, awarded by the Combined High Schools. He also received the 'DAU Medal', a medal in recognition of an individual, who has made the most outstanding on and off field contribution to the rugby league program at Endeavour Sports High School.

Brad Kelly, a teacher at the school, said "2009 was a pretty stellar year for him, he has probably achieved more this year than any other student who has gone through our rugby league program."

=== 2010 ===
King made his first grade debut against South Sydney at Jubilee Oval in round 26 on 5 September 2010. St. George Illawarra defeated Souths 38–24 and won the J. J. Giltinan Shield in front of a sell-out crowd of 18,274 people.

King was selected to play for the 2010 Junior Kangaroos against the Junior Kiwis. The match was held at Westpac Stadium Wellington on 23 October. Australia won 24–16. King scored 1 try and kicked 2 goals. He then played in the second game of the series at Rotorua International Stadium on 31 October 2010. King converted two tries, scoring a total of 4 points. Australia lost 20–36.

=== 2011 ===
On 13 January, King was named in the "Blues in waiting" squad. A three-day camp from 21–23 January at Homebush was coordinated by coach Ricky Stuart for players who he believed had potential to feature in future New South Wales Origin teams. He was earmarked by The Daily Telegraph as a future NRL superstar in an article that also featured Dragons Toyota Cup teammates, Beau Henry and Kalifa Faifai-Loa.

King was given the opportunity to start at hooker for the annual Charity Shield match, against South Sydney, that was held at Stadium Australia on 13 February 2011, due to the absence of hooker Dean Young to injury and with Nathan Fien filling in at five eighth for Jamie Soward who was on representative duty for the annual All Stars Match.

On 22 February 2011, it was confirmed that King had re-signed with St. George for a further two years. In an interview with The Leader upon re-signing, King said "I'm happy here...It's a good club to be at and I didn't feel the need to look anywhere else."

King was selected to play in the 2011 World Club Challenge on 27 February 2011 at DW Stadium against the 2010 Super League premiers, Wigan. He came off the bench and in the 55th minute managed to dummy his marker from a metre out of the try line before barging over to score his first try for the Red V and one that would prove to be the game winner. St. George went on to win the game 21–15 in front of 24,268 fans. He left the field shortly after scoring his try when he ruptured his pectoral muscle trying to tackle New Zealand Warriors fullback Sam Tomkins.

On 5 August 2011, King made a successful comeback from the injury sustained during the World Cup Challenge by coming off the bench with a strong 50-minute performance in St. George's under-20s 28–0 win against Wests Tigers at the Sydney Football Stadium in round 22. He went on to play the last 5 games of the season.

On 16 October 2011, King played for the Junior Kangaroos against the Junior Kiwis, at Ausgrid Stadium.

=== 2012 ===
In an article by Fox Sports, King was mentioned as a "rookie to watch" and a contender for the 2012 NRL rookie of the year award.

On 11 March 2012, the day after St. George Illawarra player Beau Scott had signed with the Newcastle Knights, it was reported by the media that ex Dragons coach Wayne Bennett was also attempting to poach King to Newcastle. As Wayne Bennett got off the Newcastle team bus at Shark Park before the Newcastle side were due to play Cronulla, an irate Saints fan let him know what she thought of his poaching of Beau Scott and speculation that rookie hooker Cameron King may also be Newcastle-bound. "Don't you take Cameron King off us," the woman screamed as she poked her finger in Bennett's face. "You've taken Beau Scott and Darius Boyd and all those others, but don't you take Cameron King."

On 12 April 2012, it was confirmed that King had re-signed with the St. George club for a further two years which would have seen him stay at the club until at least the end of the 2014 season. Upon re-signing, King said "It's good. I'm really happy. I didn't really want to leave and I'm happy to be here for another two years,’’ he said. ‘'It was the best thing for me and my family at the moment. I've got a lot of family in Sydney and to move anywhere else would have been hard." "I'm really excited to have re-signed with the Dragons. We are a very proud club, I really enjoy being here and they have been great to me. We have a lot of young talented guys coming through the ranks and a great group of established senior players. I believe the club has a big future and I want to be a part of it."

On 4 July 2012, King along with teammates David Gower, Michael Lett and Jack Stockwell played for the NSW Cup Representative side against the Queensland Residents at Suncorp Stadium. The match was a curtain raiser to the 2012 State of Origin game III decider.

=== 2013 ===
On 25 September 2013, King signed with the North Queensland Cowboys. At the time King Said "The Cowboys have given me the chance to play some more regular NRL and an additional year so I am looking forward to this and am thankful to the Dragons to allow me the chance to take up this opportunity."

=== 2014 ===
King started his career for the North Queensland side by playing in their reserve grade feeder team Northern Pride RLFC in the Queensland Cup.

Cameron debuted for North Queensland in their round 9 win over arch-rivals the Brisbane Broncos.

In the round 10 match against the Sydney Roosters, while attempting to make a tackle, King ruptured the anterior cruciate ligament (ACL) in his left-knee four-minutes from full-time. "King's been a turning point for us," said teammate Brent Tate, "so it's really disappointing."

=== 2015 ===
On 13 August 2015, King signed a one-year contract with the Parramatta Eels starting in 2016.

=== 2016 ===
In February, King was a member of the Eels Auckland Nines squad that triumphed over the New Zealand Warriors 22–4 to win their maiden Auckland 9's title. Parramatta were later stripped of the Auckland Nines title and, due to salary cap restraints, King was forced to play outside the NRL squad for the remainder of the season with reserve grade team Wentworthville Magpies.

In November, it was announced by the Parramatta club that King was re-signed for a further year.

In an interview with the Daily Telegraph in December, King thanked his friendship to former NRL player Kyle Stanley for his career and the help he was given during every injury set-back. "He was just so inspirational,’’ King said. "We have been best mates since we were 15 and I have never met a tougher man. What I was going through was nothing compared to what he had copped and he really put it into perspective.'’ "He will be on the field with me every game I ever play,’’ King said. "I have made a promise to write his name on my wrist every time I take the field.'’

=== 2017 ===
King was named at hooker to make his NRL debut for Parramatta in their round 17 clash with arch-rivals the Canterbury-Bankstown Bulldogs. King re-signed with Parramatta until the end of the 2018 season King played a total of 11 games for Parramatta in the 2017 NRL season as the club finished fourth on the table. King played in both finals matches as Parramatta suffered a shock loss in the elimination final against North Queensland.

=== 2018 ===
King started the 2018 season as first choice hooker ahead of Kaysa Pritchard. In Round 2 against Manly, King suffered a serious concussion and was stretchered from the field. King returned to the starting lineup for the following week against Cronulla but following a 14–4 defeat he was one of the players dropped to reserve grade by coach Brad Arthur. After spending 2 months in reserve grade, King was recalled back into The Parramatta side for their round 11 game against The New Zealand Warriors. King finished 2018 with 11 appearances for Parramatta as the club finished last on the table and claimed its 14th wooden spoon. On 13 September, King announced via his Instagram page that he would be leaving Parramatta after being released by the club.

On 14 November, King took to Twitter in a desperate attempt to find a new club to play for in 2019. King posted "Cameron King, Hooker, 90 kg, All round good guy, Enjoys hard work and winning, looking for a club, please RETWEET to raise awareness".

=== 2019 and 2020 ===
On 9 January, King signed a 1-year deal to join English side Featherstone Rovers.

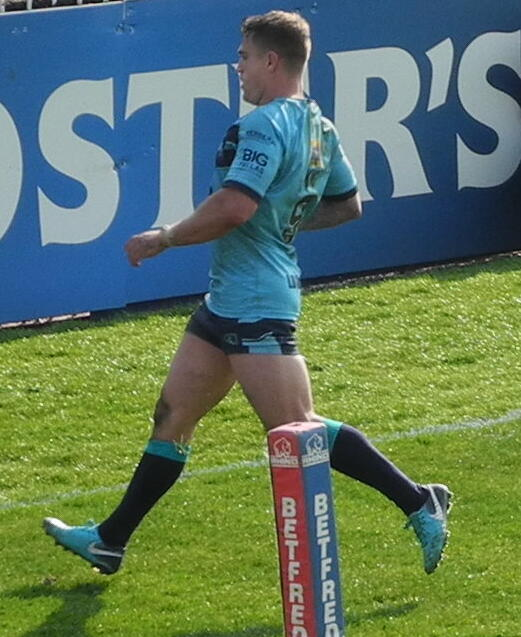
King playing for Featherstone in 2019

On 5 October, King played for Featherstone in the Million Pound Game which they lost 24–6 against the Toronto Wolfpack.

On 29 October 2019, it was revealed that King had been released by Featherstone. King spoke to the media saying "Things are probably taking a little longer than I'd hoped, But I do have options back in the UK and in Australia. It's good to get back home and be talking to people and figure out what I want to do. I've been around friends and family and had a mental break from footy, but I've been assessing the options for next year, whether that be the Championship again, stepping up to Super League or coming back to Australia".

On 2 December 2019, King signed a contract to join Cronulla-Sutherland for the 2020 NRL season.

In February 2020, King was taken from the field during Cronulla's trial game against Canterbury-Bankstown with a suspected knee injury. It was later revealed that King had suffered a season ending ACL injury. King posted on Twitter saying "It's still sinking in that my season is over. It's been hard to accept what's happened and I'd be lying if I said I'm ok. I'm taking things 1 day at a time and determined to not let this defeat me physically or mentally. Thank you all for the support".

On 15 October 2020, King announced his retirement from the NRL.

== Personal life ==
King's brother-in-law is former international Greg Alexander, who is married to King's oldest sister Tanya.

His father, Stephen King played lower grades at the Penrith Panthers in the 1970s. He later went on to play in country towns Wellington, Coonamble, Condobolin, Mudgee before taking up a captain/coaching role for Brothers and Turvey Park in the local Wagga Rugby League Competition Group 9 Rugby League and Group 13 Rugby League respectively.

== Statistics ==
=== NRL ===
Statistics are correct as at 2019 season

Season	Team	Matches	T	G	GK %	F/G	Pts
2010	St George Illawarra Dragons	1	0	0	—	0	0
2012	St George Illawarra Dragons	5	0	0	—	0	0
2013	St George Illawarra Dragons	11	0	1	100.0	0	2
2014	North Queensland Cowboys	2	0	0	—	0	0
2015	North Queensland Cowboys	2	0	0	—	0	0
2016	Parramatta Eels	0	0	0	—	0	0
2017	Parramatta Eels	11	0	0	—	0	0
2018	Parramatta Eels	11	0	0	—	0	0
2019	Featherstone	28	18	3			78
Career totals		71	18	4	100.0	0	80

== Achievements and career highlights ==
- 2008

S. G. Ball Cup Debut: – Round 1, St. George Dragons v Parramatta Eels at Cabramatta Sports Ground, 16 February 2008

NYC Debut: – Round 19, St. George Illawarra Dragons v Melbourne Storm at Olympic Park Stadium, 21 July 2008

- 2009

Australian Schoolboys Team captain

ARL Schoolboy Cup Member

New South Wales Under-18s Captain

New South Wales CHS Under-18s Captain

- 2010

First Grade Debut: – Round 26, St. George Illawarra Dragons v South Sydney Rabbitohs at Jubilee Oval, 5 September 2010

Minor Premiership won

Australian Junior Kangaroos member

- 2011

Charity Shield victory

World Club Challenge victory

Australian Junior Kangaroos member

- 2012

Charity Shield victory

New South Wales Cup Debut: – Round 1, Illawarra Cutters v Cronulla-Sutherland Sharks at WIN Stadium, Wollongong, 3 March 2012

New South Wales Cup Origin Representative

- 2014

Queensland Cup Debut: – Round 1, Northern Pride v Mackay Cutters

North Queensland Cowboys Debut: – Round 9, North Queensland Cowboys v Brisbane Broncos at Willows Sports Complex, 9 May 2014

- 2016

NRL Auckland Nines victory

2016 Geoff Gerard NSW Cup Coaches' Award

- 2017

Parramatta Eels Debut: – Round 17, Parramatta Eels v Canterbury-Bankstown Bulldogs at Stadium Australia, 29 June 2017.

- 2018

Ray Price NRL Community Award
