= Roger Laka =

PNG international rugby league footballer

Personal information
- Born: 23 March 1988 (age 38)

Playing information
- Position: Scrum-half
Club
Years	Team	Pld	T	G	FG	P
2015	PNG Hunters
Representative
Years	Team	Pld	T	G	FG	P
2013–14	PNG Prime Minister's XIII	2	0	0	0	0
2013	Papua New Guinea	1	1	0	0	4
- Source: Roger Laka rugbyleagueproject.org As of 9 November 2023

Roger Laka is a Papua New Guinean rugby league footballer who plays as a scrum-half for the Enga Mioks in PNG.

== Playing career ==
Laka was a member of the Papua New Guinea squad for the 2013 World Cup. He scored a try in a warm-up match against Scotland, but did not feature in the tournament itself.
