= 2013 Northern Pride RLFC season =

Coordinates: 16°55′49″S 145°46′2″E

Northern Pride
Club information
- Full name: Northern Pride Rugby League Football Club
- Nickname: The Pride
- Colours: Black, teal and gold
- Founded: 2007
- Website: northernpride.com.au

Current details
- Ground: Barlow Park, Cairns (seating 1,700, standing 15,000)
- CEO: Chris Sheppard, Brock Schaefer (2013-2014)
- Coach: Jason Demetriou (2013-2014)
- Captain: Ty Williams (2011-2013)
- Competition: Intrust Super Cup
- 2013: 1st
Home colours

Away colours

Records
- Premierships: 2 (2010, 2014)
- Runners-up: 1 (2009)
- Minor premierships: 3 (2013, 2014, 2024)

2013 was the sixth competitive season for the Skill360 Northern Pride Rugby League Football Club based in Cairns, Queensland, Australia. They were one of 12 clubs that played in the eighteenth season of Queensland's top rugby league competition, QRL's Intrust Super Cup, with each team playing 11 home games and 11 away games over 24 weeks between March and August.

New coach Jason Demetriou was appointed on a two-year deal, replacing last year's coach, David Maiden (2010-2012), who was now QRL's Cairns-based Region Co-ordinator. Demetriou had played for Newtown Jets in the Metropolitan Cup, before moving to England where he played centre, lock, second-row and five-eighth for Lancashire Lynx, Rochdale Hornets, Widnes Vikings, and Keighley Cougars, was captain for Wakefield Trinity Wildcats, and an international, having represented Canada in the 2000 Rugby League Emerging Nations World Championship, and Greece in 2007. He was coach for the Keighley Cougars (2011-2012), before moving home to Australia to take up the job with the Pride. In his first season in Cairns he was awarded the 'Men of League' Coach of the Year.

The Pride moved their administration from Jones Park, Mann Street, to 'Northern Pride HQ', Moore House at Barlow Park, and the team spent more time training at West Barlow Park.

The Pride played three pre-season trial matches. The first was the opening match to the North Queensland Cowboys v St George Illawarra Dragons trial match, which attracted a crowd of over 12,000. The game against the winners of the 2012 Digicel Cup, East New Britain Province side Agmark Rabaul Gurias, attracted a crowd of several thousand enthusiastic PNG ex-pats. The third trial saw a full-strength Pride squad with six Cowboys beat local rivals Mackay Cutters 40-12. Two weeks later in Round 1 the Pride beat the Cutters 44-12.

The Round 4 away game against Tweed Heads Seagulls was relocated to Billy Slater Oval, Callendar Park, Innisfail with funding provided by Cassowary Coast Regional Council. Country Week (Round 20), was played at Jilara Oval, Yarrabah, effectively giving the Pride two extra home games this season.

Except for Round 2 and Round 9, the Pride were on the top of the ladder every week, finishing in first place at the end of the regular season with 17 wins to claim their first Minor Premiership. Despite their winning form this season, the Pride lost both the Major Semi-Final (to Easts Tigers) and the Preliminary Final (to Mackay Cutters), missing out on a Grand Final appearance. The Cutters went on to defeat the Tigers in the Grand Final.

At the end of the season Captain Ty Williams retired.

Northern Pride 2013 ISC video highlights (10 Videos).

== 2013 Season - Skill360 Northern Pride ==
- Competition: Intrust Super Cup
- Sponsor: Skill360

=== Staff ===
==== Coaches/Trainers ====
- Coach: Jason Demetriou
- Assistant coach: Ben Rauter
- Assistant coach: Joe O'Callaghan
- Mal Meninga Cup U-18s coach: Cameron 'Spilla' Miller
- Cyril Connell Cup U-16s coach: Paul Callaghan
- Strength and conditioning coach: Patrick Ranasinghe
- Trainer: Deb Gallop
- Physiotherapist: Tim Laycock

==== Captains ====
- Ty Williams
- Brett Anderson (Rounds 9, 15 & 24)
- Jason Roos (Round 16)

==== Managers ====
- Operations manager: Sheron McDougall
- Team manager: Rob White
- Club captain:
- Business development manager: Brock Schaefer
- 'Take Pride' Program Manager: Chey Bird
- Accounts Manager: Lauren Dowling
- Chief executive: Chris Sheppard then Brock Schaefer.
  (Shep resigned in April 2013, and was replaced the following month by Northern Pride business development manager, Brock Schaefer).
- Chairman: Bob Fowler
- Board of Directors: Craig Meiklejohn, Bob Fowler, Anthony Mirotsos, Bill Phillips, David Smith.

== 2013 Squad ==
The Pride used 32 players this season. Fourteen players from last year signed with the club again, and six of the Cowboys allocation players from last year were assigned to the Pride again this year. Twelve new players made their debut this season; eight were new signings (Aiden Smith, Jordan Biondi-Odo, Mervyn Walker, Nick Dorante, Sam Obst, Semi Tadulala, Steve Snitch and Tom Hancock), and four were new Cowboys allocation players (Felise Kaufusi*, Kyle Feldt*, Ray Thompson* and Scott Moore*). Although Ethan Lowe was signed by the Cowboys, he was allocated to the Pride and made 20 appearances in QCup this season.

Ty Williams (c).
Aidan Smith.
Alex Starmer.
Ben Laity.
Ben Spina.
Brent Oosen.
Brett Anderson.
Brian Murgha
Davin Crampton.
Hezron Murgha.
Jamie Frizzo.
Jason Roos.
Jordan Biondi-Odo.

Jordan Tighe
Justin Castellaro (Italy) .
Maddie Oosen.
Mervyn Walker
Nick Dorante.
Noel Underwood.
Rickki Sutherland.
Ryan Ghietti (Italy) .
Sam Obst.
Semi Tadulala (Fiji)
Shaun Nona.
Steve Snitch (England) .
Tom Hancock.

Trial

Dylan Taylor
Zac Parter

Pride U-18 Squad
Bradley Stephen
Josateki Murray
Pete Tognolini

North Queensland Cowboys allocation

Blake Leary*
Ethan Lowe*
Felise Kaufusi* (New Zealand)
Joel Riethmuller* (Italy)
Kyle Feldt*
Ray Thompson*
Ricky Thorby*
Robert Lui*
Scott Bolton*
Scott Moore*
Wayne Ulugia* (New Zealand)

Allocated but did not play for the Pride in 2013:
Matthew Bowen
Ashley Graham
Dallas Johnson
Tariq Sims
James Tamou

=== 2013 player gains ===
Player	From League	From Club
Steve Snitch	English RFL Super League	Castleford Tigers
Sam Obst	English RFL Championship 1	Keighley Cougars
Semi Tadulala	English RFL Championship 1	Keighley Cougars
Jordan Tighe	NRL U-20s	Gold Coast Titans
Nick Dorante	NRL U-20s	North Queensland Cowboys
Tom Hancock	NRL U-20s	North Queensland Cowboys
Mervyn Walker	Intrust Super Cup	Ipswich Jets
Aidan Smith	Auckland Rugby League	Northcote Tigers
Brian Murgha	CDRL	Edmonton Storm
Jordan Biondi-Odo	CDRL	Innisfail Brothers

=== Player losses after 2012 season ===
Player	To League	To Club
Ethan Lowe	NRL Telstra Premiership	North Queensland Cowboys
Saia Makisi	Intrust Super Cup	Wynnum Manly Seagulls
Rod Jensen	CDRL	Mareeba Gladiators
Chey Bird	Retired	
Brenton Bowen	Retired	
Mark Dalle Cort	Retired	
Luke Harlen	Retired	(knee injury)
Ben Fitzpatrick	Released	
Mitchell Seri	Released	
Scott Gibson	Released	

==== Cowboys no longer allocated to the Pride ====
Player	To League	To Club
Cory Paterson*	Super League	Hull Kingston Rovers
James Segeyaro*	NRL Telstra Premiership	Penrith Panthers
Kalifa Faifai Loa*	NRL Telstra Premiership	North Queensland Cowboys
Luke Harlen*	Retired	(knee injury)

=== 2013 season launch ===
- Pre-Season Training: 5 November 2012.
- Pre Season Boot Camp: Lake Tinaroo, Atherton Tablelands - Friday 18-Sunday 20 January 2013.
- DonateLife Week fund-raiser: Touch football match against Lotus Glen prison inmates, 27 February 2013.
- Season Launch: Thursday, 14 March 2013. 7.00pm at Mount Sheridan Plaza.

==== 2013 player awards ====
Sunday 1 September 2013, Brothers World of Entertainment, Manunda

- Skill360 Australia Northern Pride Player of the Year: Davin Crampton.
- Sea Swift Players' Player: Hezron Murgha
- Sea Swift Members' Player of the Year: Hezron Murgha
- Sea Swift Most improved player: Shaun Nona
- Sea Swift Best Back: Sam Obst
- Sea Swift Best Forward: Ethan Lowe*
- John O'Brien Perpetual Club Person of the Year: Cameron Penny
- XXXX People's Choice Award: Hezron Murgha
- Men of League Coach of the Year: Jason Demetriou
- Intrust Super Cup Leading Try Scorer: Davin Crampton.

==== 2013 player records ====
- Most Games: Ben Spina (24).
- Most Tries: Davin Crampton (19).
- Most Points: Shaun Nona (88).

==== 2013 representative players ====
Ryan Ghietti played for Italy Azzurri in the 2013 Rugby League World Cup

==== 2013 Queensland Residents team ====
Blake Leary
Hezron Murgha

==== Players signed to first-tier teams ====
Player	To League	To Club
Hezron Murgha	NRL Telstra Premiership	North Queensland Cowboys
Noel Underwood	NRL Telstra Premiership	Newcastle Knights
Steve Snitch	English RFL Betfred Championship	Doncaster RLFC

==== 2013 Jerseys ====
2013 primary Jersey

2013 alternative Jersey

=== Trial matches ===
Pre-season Trial 1
Saturday
16 February 2013
17:30 AEST (UTC+10)

Northern Pride	20 – 18	NYC NQ Cowboys U-20s
Tries: Hezron Murgha 2 Semi Tadulala 1 Brett Anderson 1 Goals: Ethan Lowe* 2	Cairns Post Report; Cowboys Report	Tries: 1 Jack Kelleher; 1 Javid Bowen; 1 Corey Jensen; Goals: 3 Javid Bowen

Barlow Park
(Severin Street, Parramatta Park, QLD)
Attendance: 12,036

Skill360 Northern Pride: 1. Hezron Murgha – FB 2. Semi Tadulala – WG 3. Brett Anderson – CE 4. Davin Crampton – CE 5. Justin Castellaro – WG 6. Shaun Nona – FE 7. Sam Obst – HB 8. Alex Starmer – PR 9. Ryan Ghietti – HK 10. Nick Dorante – PR 11. Blake Leary* – SR 12. Tom Hancock – SR 13. Ethan Lowe* – LK
Unlimited Interchange: 14. 14. Brian Murgha, 15. Aiden Smith, 16. Felise Kaufusi*, 17. Jordon Tighe, 18. Rickki Sutherland, 19. Ben Laity, 20. Brent Oosen.
* = Cowboys allocation
Unavailable: Ty Williams, Jason Roos (knee), Noel Underwood (knee), Ben Spina (selected to play for the North Queensland Cowboys).
North Queensland Cowboys: 1 Zac Santo, 2 Zac Mackay, 3 Javid Bowen, 4 Samsen O'Neill, 5 Len Magey, 6 Alex Grant, 7 Sam Foster, 8 Damon Tauroa-Rauhihi, 9 Jayden Hodges, 10 Patrick Kaufusi, 11 Jack Kelleher, 12 Jack Svendsen, 13 Chris Grevsmuhl.
Interchange: 14 Jorden White, 15 P J Webb, 16 Jack Rycen, 17 Sean Young, 18 Andrew Asi-Hunt Niemoller, 19 Kunro Kalo, 20 Brady Williams, 21 Mitchell Grimes, 22 Corey Jensen.
- Note: This game was played as the opening match to the 'Sea Swift Cairns Challenge' North Queensland Cowboys v St George Illawarra Dragons trial match, which started at 7.30pm. The Cowboys won 28–22. The Pride players that were not selected for this game joined the U-18s squad and played against the CDRL Mareeba Gladiators.

Pre-season Trial 2
Saturday
23 February 2013
18:30 AEST (UTC+10)

Northern Pride	22 – 29	Agmark Rabaul Gurias
Tries: Hezron Murgha 1 Davin Crampton 1 Sam Pau 1 Aidan Smith 1 Goals: Shaun Nona 2 (2 from 3); Brian Murgha 1 (1 from 1)	Pride Preview; Pride Report; Cairns Post Report	Tries: 2 Ase Boas; 1 Simon; 1 Nelson Daplen; 1 Dion Aiye; 1 Albert Patak; Goals: 1 Jacky Marcus (1 from 5); Ase Boas 1 (1 from 1); Field goal: 1 Ase Boas

Barlow Park
(Severin Street, Parramatta Park, QLD)
Attendance: Several thousand
Player of the Match: Ase Boas (Gurias)

Skill360 Northern Pride: 1. Hezron Murgha – FB 2. Semi Tadulala – WG 3. Brett Anderson – CE 4. Ty Williams (c) – CE 5. Davin Crampton – WG 6. Shaun Nona – FE 7. Sam Obst – HB 8. Ben Laity – PR 9. Ryan Ghietti – HK 10. Nick Dorante – PR 11. Brent Oosen – SR 12. Steve Snitch – SR 13. Ben Spina – LK
Unlimited Interchange: 14. Mervyn Walker, 17. Tom Hancock, 18. Alex Starmer, 21. Aidan Smith, 22. Jordan Tighe, 23. Zac Parter, 24. Bradley Stephen, 25. Justin Castellaro, 26. Jordan Biondi-Odo, 27. Brian Murgha, 28. Sam Pau, 29. Josateki Murray (U-18s), 30. Pete Tognolini.
* = Cowboys allocation
Unavailable: Noel Underwood (knee), Jason Roos (knee)
Agmark Rabaul Gurias: 1. Albert Patak, 2. Chris Jerry, 3. Francis Paniu, 4. Jacky Marcus, 5. Boas Ruru, 6. Dion Aiye, 7. Ase Boas, 8. Junior Pangogo, 9. Wartovo Puara Jr, 10. Daniel Pai, 11. Emmanuel John, 12. Hobert Hondole, 13. Kot Kerowa.
Interchange: 14. Eliab Pauria, 15. Nelson Daplen 16. Sakisa Kabange.
- Note: The Agmark Rabaul Gurias are from Kokopo, the capital of East New Britain in Papua New Guinea. They are the 2012 Premiers of the PNG League Championship, the Digimark Cup. The Gurias entered the PNG Championship in 1990 (the championship has been variously called the PNG Intercity Rugby League Competition, the SP Cup, the bemobile Cup and the Digimark Cup). Their first success came in 1999 when they were runners up, then 2000 (runners up), 2001 (premiers), 2002 (runners up), 2003 (premiers), 2005 (premiers), 2007 (runners up), 2009 (premiers), 2011 (runners up), 2012 (premiers).
  This game was broadcast live in East New Britain on local FM radio NBC ENB.

Pre-season Trial 3
Saturday
2 March 2013
18:00 AEST (UTC+10)

Northern Pride	40 – 12	Mackay Cutters
Tries: Hezron Murgha 1 Semi Tadulala 3 Ryan Ghietti 1 Ethan Lowe* 1 Davin Crampton 1 Kyle Feldt* 1 Goals: Kyle Feldt* 2 Shaun Nona 1 Ethan Lowe* 1	Pride Preview; Cairns Post Preview; Pride Report; Townsville Bulletin Report	Tries: 1 Kane Linnett; 1 Delane Edward Goals: 2 Liam Taylor

Burdekin Football Fields
(Ayr, QLD)

Skill360 Northern Pride: 1. Hezron Murgha – FB 2. Wayne Ulugia* – WG 3. Brett Anderson – CE 4. Ty Williams (c) – CE 5. Semi Tadulala – WG 6. Shaun Nona – FE 7. Ryan Ghietti – HB 8. Nick Dorante – PR 9. Sam Obst – HK 10. Felise Kaufusi* – PR 11. Ethan Lowe* – SR 12. Steve Snitch – SR 13. Blake Leary* – LK
Interchange: 14. Brian Murgha, 15. Kyle Feldt*, 16. Aidan Smith, 17. Ben Spina, 18. Alex Starmer, 19. Ricky Thorby*, 20. Davin Crampton.
* = Cowboys allocation
Unavailable: Noel Underwood (knee), Jason Roos (knee)
Mackay Cutters: 1. Liam Taylor, 2. Michael Comerford, 3. Curtis Rona, 4. Michael Koko, 5. Tyson Muscat, 6. Dave Petersen, 7. Delane Edwards, 8. Sam Hoare, 9. Andy Gay, 10. Joel Clinton, 11. Tyson Martin, 12. Jake Cooley, 13. Matt Constantinou.
Interchange: 14. David Milne, 15. Merv Williamson, 16. Sam Miles, 17. Tyson Andrews, 18. Jason Schirnack, 19. Karl Davies, 20. Chris Gesch, 21. Dean Webster, 22. Pulou Vaittuutuu.
- Note: Several Pride players played in the CDRL competition on 9–10 March. Justin Castellaro (Brothers), Steve Snitch (Edmonton), Jordan Biondi-Odo (Innisfail), Jordan Tighe and Mervyn Walker (Mareeba), Rickki Sutherland and Brent Oosen (Suburbs), Aidan Smith (Mossman), Noel Underwood (Yarrabah).

=== Intrust Super Cup matches ===
ROUND 1: Intrust Super Cup 2013 - Queensland Country Health Fund Cup

Saturday
16 March 2013
18:30 AEST (UTC+10)

Northern Pride	44 – 12	Mackay Cutters
Tries: Davin Crampton 2 Hezron Murgha 2 Blake Leary* 2 Sam Obst 1 Brett Anderson 1 Goals: Shaun Nona 6 (6 from 6); Ethan Lowe* (0 from 2) 0	Cairns Post Preview; Pride Report; QRL Video; Press Conference	Tries: 1 David Milne; 1 Jardine Bobongie Goals: 2 Liam Taylor (2 from 2)

Barlow Park
(Severin Street, Parramatta Park, QLD)
Referee: Tim Rutherford

Skill360 Northern Pride 1. Hezron Murgha – FB 2. Davin Crampton – WG 3. Brett Anderson – CE 4. Ty Williams (c) – CE 5. Semi Tadulala – WG 6. Shaun Nona – FE 7. Robert Lui* – HB 8. Alex Starmer – PR 9. Sam Obst – HK 10. Ricky Thorby* – PR 11. Ethan Lowe* – SR 12. Blake Leary* – SR 13. Joel Riethmuller* – LK
Interchange: 14. Aidan Smith, 15. Scott Bolton*, 16. Ben Spina, 17. Steve Snitch.
* = Cowboys allocation
Unavailable: Noel Underwood (knee), Jason Roos (knee), Ben Laity (calf).
Mackay Cutters: 1. Liam Taylor, 2. Bureta Faraimo, 3. Curtis Rona*, 4. Michael Koko, 5. Michael Comerford, 6. Dave Petersen, 7. Matt Minto, 8. Sam Hoare*, 9. Anthony Mitchell, 10. Joel Clinton, 11. Tyson Martin, 12. Chris Grevsmuhl, 13. Jardine Bobongie.
Interchange: 14. Alex Elisala, 15. Tyson Andrews, 16. Pulou Vaituutuu, 17. Jake Cooley, 5. David Milne
Coach: Kim Williams.
- Note: First round local derby between the Pride and the Mackay Cutters.
  This was the Pride debut for Semi Tadulala, Sam Obst, Aiden Smith and Steve Snitch (Pride Players 085-088).

Position	Round 1 - 2013	P	W	D	L	B	For	Against	Diff	Pts
1	Northern Pride	1	1	0	0	0	44	12	+32	2

ROUND 2: Intrust Super Cup 2013

Sunday
24 March 2013
14:00 AEST (UTC+10)

Burleigh Bears	22 – 24	Northern Pride
Tries: Danny Kerr 1 Tyler Chadburn 1 James Stuart 1 Jordan Atkins* 1 Goals: Danny Kerr (3 from 4) 3	Pride Preview; Cairns Post Preview; Pride Report; QRL Photos	Tries: 1Robert Lui*; 1 Kyle Feldt*; 1Ben Spina; 1 Hezron Murgha; Goals: 4 Shaun Nona (4 from 4)

Pizzey Park
(Miami, Gold Coast, QLD)
Referee: Clayton Sharpe.
Player of the Match: Channel 9/XXXX Man of the Match: Ben Spina

Skill360 Northern Pride: 1. Hezron Murgha – FB 2. Wayne Ulugia* – WG 22. Kyle Feldt* – CE 4. Ty Williams (c) – CE 5. Semi Tadulala – WG 6. Shaun Nona – FE 7. Robert Lui* – HB 8. Alex Starmer – PR 9. Sam Obst – HK 15. Ricky Thorby* – PR 11. Steve Snitch – SR 12. Ethan Lowe* – SR 13. Ben Spina – LK
Interchange: 10. Felise Kaufusi*, 12. Davin Crampton, 14. Ryan Ghietti, 21. Aidan Smith.
* = Cowboys allocation
Unavailable: Noel Underwood (knee), Joel Riethmuller* (hamstring), Brett Anderson (hip), Jason Roos (knee), Ben Laity (calf).
Burleigh Bears: 1. Anthony Don*, 2. Jordan Atkins*, 3. Jamie Dowling*, 4. James Stuart, 5. Steve Michaels*, 6. Jordan Rankin*, 7. Danny Kerr, 8. Pele Peletelese, 9. Sam Meskell, 10. Luke Page, 11. Darren Griffiths (c), 12. Shane Gray*, 13. Tyron Haynes.
Interchange: 14. Sam Irwin, 15. Mark Ioane*, 16. Lee Mitchell, 17. Louis Fanene, 6. Tyler Chadburn.
* = Gold Coast Titans allocation.
Coach: Carl Briggs.
- Note: Broadcast live on Channel 9 with Matthew Thompson, Scott Sattler and Adrian Vowles as the commentary team.
  This was the Pride debut for North Queensland Cowboys allocation players Kyle Feldt* and Felise Kaufusi* (Pride Players 089 & 090).

Position	Round 2 - 2013	P	W	D	L	B	For	Against	Diff	Pts
2	Northern Pride	2	2	0	0	0	68	34	+34	2

ROUND 3: Intrust Super Cup 2013

Saturday
30 March 2013
18:30 AEST (UTC+10)

Northern Pride	50 – 16	Souths Logan Magpies
Tries: Ty Williams 2 Ben Spina 1 Ricky Thorby* 1 Robert Lui* 1 Hezron Murgha 1 Davin Crampton 1 Brett Anderson 1 Wayne Ulugia* 1 Goals: Shaun Nona (7 from 9) 7	Cairns Post Preview; Cairns Post Report; Cairns Post Report; Press Conference; QRL Video	Tries: 1 Dallas Anderson; 1 Nick Doyle; 1 Chris Faust Goals: 2 Nick Doyle (2 from 3)

Barlow Park
(Severin Street, Parramatta Park, QLD)
Referee: Clayton Sharpe

Skill360 Northern Pride: 1. Hezron Murgha – FB 2. Wayne Ulugia* – WG 22. Kyle Feldt* – CE 4. Ty Williams (c) – CE 5. Brett Anderson – WG 6. Shaun Nona – FE 7. Robert Lui* – HB 8. Alex Starmer – PR 9. Sam Obst – HK 10. Ricky Thorby* – PR 11. Joel Riethmuller* – SR 12. Steve Snitch – SR 13. Ben Spina – LK
Interchange: 14. Ryan Ghietti, 15. Ben Laity, 16. Felise Kaufusi*, 17. Davin Crampton.
* = Cowboys allocation
Unavailable: Noel Underwood (knee), Jason Roos (knee).
Souths Logan Magpies: 1. Ben Henaway, 2. Dallas Anderson, 3. Nick Doyle, 4. David Faamita, 5. Luke Archer, 6. Phil Dennis (c), 7. Rhys Jacks, 8. Matt Pitman, 9. Ben Cronin, 10. Andrew Edwards, 11. Chris Faust, 12. Tulson Caird, 13. Rez Phillips.
Interchange: 14. Ben Thorburn, 15. Darcy Wright, 16. Sam Gardel, 17. Zac Lemburg.
Coach: Mark Beaumont.

Position	Round 3 - 2013	P	W	D	L	B	For	Against	Diff	Pts
1	Northern Pride	3	3	0	0	0	118	50	+68	6

ROUND 4: Intrust Super Cup 2013

Saturday
6 April 2013
19:00 AEST (UTC+10)

Tweed Heads Seagulls	24 – 14	Northern Pride
Tries: Beau Henry1; Shaun Carney 1 Chris Binge 1 Marmin Barba 1 Goals: Beau Henry (4 from 4) 4	Cairns Post Preview; Cairns Post Preview; Cairns Post Report; Northern Rivers Echo Report; QRL Video	Tries: 1 Ty Williams; 1 Sam Obst; 1 Brett Anderson Goals: 0 Ethan Lowe* (0 from 1); 1 Shaun Nona (1 from 2)

Billy Slater Oval
(Callendar Park, Innisfail, QLD.)
Referee: Rob Gallacher

Skill360 Northern Pride: 1. Hezron Murgha – FB 2. Semi Tadulala – WG 3. Brett Anderson – CE 4. Ty Williams (c) – CE 5. Wayne Ulugia* – WG 6. Shaun Nona – FE 7. Scott Moore* – HB 8. Alex Starmer – PR 9. Sam Obst – HK 10. Felise Kaufusi* – PR 11. Ethan Lowe* – SR 12. Ben Spina – SR 13. Joel Riethmuller* – LK
Interchange: 14. Ryan Ghietti, 15. Ben Laity, 16. 16. Noel Underwood, 17. Blake Leary*.
* = Cowboys allocation
Unavailable: Jason Roos (knee).
Tweed Heads Seagulls: 1. Shaun Carney, 2. Ali Hijazi, 3. James Wood (c), 4. Brad Lees, 5. Tom Merritt, 6. Chris Binge, 7. Beau Henry, 8. Aaron Cannings, 9. Matt King (c), 10. Jake Leary, 11. Mark Minichiello, 12. Tom Kingston, 13. Cory Blair.
Interchange: 14. Marmin Barba, 15. Tim Maccan, 16. Ayden Lee, 17. Kingi Akauola, 18. Sam Ross.
Coach: Aaron Zimmerle.
- Note: This was Ryan Ghietti's 50th Queensland Cup game, having played for Redcliffe Dolphins and the Pride.
  On the Friday afternoon before the game, the Pride ran family activities at Callendar Park, and then had the Captain's Run, followed by a special 'Evening With The Pride' footy function at Innisfail Brothers Leagues Club, with special guests former NRL stars Aaron Payne and Shaun Timmins. Tickets were $30.
  This was the Pride debut for North Queensland Cowboys allocation player Scott Moore* (Pride Player 091).

Position	Round 4 - 2013	P	W	D	L	B	For	Against	Diff	Pts
1	Northern Pride	4	3	0	1	0	132	74	+58	6

ROUND 5: Intrust Super Cup 2013

Sunday
14 April 2013
14:30 AEST (UTC+10)

Sunshine Coast Sea Eagles	6 – 48	Northern Pride
Tries: Justin Otto 1 Goals: Dale Middleton 1	Pride Preview; Cairns Post Report rleague.com Report; Sunshine Coast Daily Report; QRL Video	Tries: 1 Ty Williams; 1 Ethan Lowe*; 1 Hezron Murgha; 1 Mervyn Walker; 2 Davin Crampton; 1 Sam Obst; 1 Ryan Ghietti; Goals: 8 Kyle Feldt* (8 from 8)

Stockland Park
(Sportsmans Parade, Bokarina, Kawana Waters, QLD)
Referee: Chris Anderson

Skill360 Northern Pride: 1. Hezron Murgha – FB 2. Kyle Feldt* – WG 3. Brett Anderson – CE 4. Ty Williams (c) – CE 5. Wayne Ulugia* – WG 6. Ryan Ghietti – FE 7. Sam Obst – HB 8. Ricky Thorby* – PR 9. Scott Moore* – HK 10. Felise Kaufusi* – PR 11. Ethan Lowe* – SR 12. Davin Crampton – SR 13. Ben Spina – LK
Interchange: 14. Mervyn Walker, 15. Aidan Smith, 16. Steve Snitch, 17. Noel Underwood.
* = Cowboys allocation
Unavailable: Jason Roos (knee).
Sunshine Coast Sea Eagles: 1. Kyle Van Klaveren, 2. Dale Middleton, 3. Rowan Klein, 4. Jye Ballinger, 5. Tye Ingebrigtsen, 6. Callum Klein (c), 7. Justin Otto, 8. Martin Cordwell, 9. Jay Lobwein, 10. Ryan Hansen, 11. Kristian Wanka, 12. Sam Bernstrom, 13. Peter Gallen.
Interchange: 14. Jordan Meads, 15. Brendan Adams, 16. Brenton Stonier, 17. Mitchell McMahon.
Coach: Dave Cordwell.
- Note: This was the Pride debut for Mervyn Walker (Pride Player 092).

Position	Round 5 - 2013	P	W	D	L	B	For	Against	Diff	Pts
1	Northern Pride	5	4	0	1	0	180	80	+100	8

ROUND 6: Intrust Super Cup 2013

Saturday
20 April 2013
15:00 AEST (UTC+10)

Ipswich Jets	22 – 20	Northern Pride
Tries: Keiron Lander 1 Donald Malone 1 Sam Martin 1 Kurtis Lingwoodock. 1 Goals: Donald Malone (3 from 4) 3	Pride Preview; Cairns Post Preview; Cairns Post Report; QRL Report; QRL Video; QRL Photos	Tries: 1 Ethan Lowe*; 1 Wayne Ulugia*; 1 Davin Crampton; 1 Ricky Thorby*; Goals: 2 Ethan Lowe* (2 from 4)

North Ipswich Reserve
(Ipswich, QLD)
Referee: Robert Gallacher

Skill360 Northern Pride: 1. Hezron Murgha – FB 2. Wayne Ulugia* – WG 3. Brett Anderson – CE 4. Ty Williams (c) – CE 5. Semi Tadulala – WG 6. Ben Laity – FE 7. Sam Obst – HB 8. Ricky Thorby* – PR 9. Scott Moore* – HK 10. Felise Kaufusi* – PR 11. Ethan Lowe* – SR 12. Davin Crampton – SR 13. Ben Spina – LK
Interchange: 14. Ray Thompson*, 15. Aidan Smith, 16. Steve Snitch, 17. Alex Starmer.
* = Cowboys allocation
Unavailable: Kyle Feldt* (ribs).
Ipswich Jets: 1. Javarn White, 2. Nemani Valekapa, 3. Donald Malone, 4. Tu'u Maori, 5. Jarrod McInally, 6. Dane Phillips, 7. Ian Lacey, 8. Tyson Lofipo, 9. Matt Parcell, 10. Rowan Winterfield, 11. Nathaniel Neale, 12. Sam Martin, 13. Keiron Lander.
Interchange: 14. Jacob Ling, 15. Rod Griffin, 16. Matt Parcell, 17. Kurtis Lingwoodock.
Coaches: Ben Walker and Shane Walker
- Note: This was the Pride debut for North Queensland Cowboys allocation player Ray Thompson* (Pride Player 093).

Position	Round 6 - 2013	P	W	D	L	B	For	Against	Diff	Pts
1	Northern Pride	6	4	0	2	0	200	102	+98	8

ROUND 7: Intrust Super Cup 2013

27–28 April 2013

Northern Pride	BYE

Position	Round 7 - 2013	P	W	D	L	B	For	Against	Diff	Pts
1	Northern Pride	6	4	0	2	1	200	102	+98	10

ROUND 8: Intrust Super Cup 2013

Saturday
4 May 2013
18:30 AEST (UTC+10)

Northern Pride	19 – 0	Redcliffe Dolphins
Tries: Sam Obst 1 Semi Tadulala 1 Scott Bolton* 1 Goals: Shaun Nona (2 from 3) 2 Penalty Goals: Shaun Nona 1 Field Goal: Ryan Ghietti 1	Cairns Post Preview; Cairns Post Preview; Cairns Post Report; Cairns Post Report; Pride TV; Press Conference; QRL Video	Tries: Goals: Penalty Goals: Field Goal:

Barlow Park
(Severin Street, Parramatta Park, QLD)
Referee: Chris Anderson

Skill360 Northern Pride: 1. Hezron Murgha – FB 2. Wayne Ulugia* – WG 3. Brett Anderson – CE 4. Ty Williams (c) – CE 5. Semi Tadulala – WG 6. Sam Obst – FE 7. Ryan Ghietti – HB 8. Ricky Thorby* – PR 9. Shaun Nona – HK 10. Alex Starmer – PR 11. Ethan Lowe* – SR 12. Blake Leary* – SR 13. Ben Spina – LK
Interchange: 14. Davin Crampton, 15. Scott Bolton*, 16. Noel Underwood, 17. Brent Oosen.
* = Cowboys allocation
Unavailable: Aidan Smith (suspended), Nick Dorante (broken hand), Jason Roos (knee).
Redcliffe Dolphins: 1. Joe Bond, 2. Delroy Berryman, 3. Aaron Whitchurch, 4. Paul Ivan, 5. Denan Kemp, 6. Zach Strasser, 7. Luke Capewell, 8. Isaak Ah Mau, 9. Tom Murphy, 10. Petero Civoniceva (c), 11. Troy Giess, 12. Sarafu Fatiaki, 13. Jake Marketo.
Interchange: 14. Tui Samoa, 15. Joe Bradley, 16. Alex Simpson, 17. Jacob Mayer, 18. James Ackerman.
Coach: John Dixon.

Position	Round 8 - 2013	P	W	D	L	B	For	Against	Diff	Pts
1	Northern Pride	7	5	0	2	1	219	102	+117	12

ROUND 9: Intrust Super Cup 2013 - Sea Swift Challenge

Saturday
11 May 2013
18:00 AEST (UTC+10)

CQ Capras	24 – 22	Northern Pride
Tries: Russell Webber 1 Dean Blackman 1 Josh Benjamin 1 Simon Gregory 1 Goals: Ian Webster (4 from 4) 4	Cairns Post Preview; Pride Preview; Central Telegraph Report; Cairns Post Report; QRL Report; QRL Video	Tries: 1 Wayne Ulugia*; 1 Brett Anderson; 1 Ethan Lowe*; 1 Blake Leary*; Goals: 3 Kyle Feldt* (3 from 4)

Marley Browne Oval
(Gladstone, QLD)
Referee: Tim Rutherford

Skill360 Northern Pride: 1. Hezron Murgha – FB 2. Wayne Ulugia* – WG 3. Brett Anderson (c) – CE 4. Kyle Feldt* – CE 5. Semi Tadulala – WG 6. Shaun Nona – FE 7. Ryan Ghietti – HB 8. Ricky Thorby* – PR 9. Sam Obst – HK 10. Alex Starmer – PR 11. Ethan Lowe* – SR 12. Blake Leary* – SR 13. Ben Spina – LK
Interchange: 14. Felise Kaufusi*, 15. Davin Crampton, 16. Brent Oosen, 17. Noel Underwood.
* = Cowboys allocation
Unavailable: Ty Williams (Quad), Aidan Smith (suspended), Nick Dorante (broken hand), Jason Roos (knee).
Central Queensland Capras: 1. Cameron Munster, 2. Jackson McEwan, 3. Russell Webber, 4. Josh Benjamin, 5. Marco Delapena, 6. Ian Webster, 7. Dean Blackman, 8. Arlin Paki, 9. Darcy Etrich, 10. Alan Rothery, 11. Simon Gregory, 12. Brent Williams, 13. Gavin Hiscox (c).
Interchange: 14. Jonathan Tavinor, 15. Reggie Saunders, 16. John Clayton, 17. Fletcher Jarrett, 18. Nathan Young, 19. Mitch Ireland.
Coach: Jason Hetherington.
- Note: This match was the inaugural Sea Swift Challenge. It was the Pride's third loss and they slipped to joint second place on the ladder with Wynnum Manly Seagulls and Souths Logan Magpies, one point behind the Mackay Cutters.

Position	Round 9 - 2013	P	W	D	L	B	For	Against	Diff	Pts
2	Northern Pride	8	5	0	3	1	241	126	+115	12

ROUND 10: Intrust Super Cup 2013

Sunday
19 May 2013
14:00 AEST (UTC+10)

Wynnum Manly Seagulls	6 – 20	Northern Pride
Tries: Peter Gubb 1 Goals: Matt Seamark 1 Penalty Goals:	Cairns Post Preview; Pride Report; QRL Report; QRL Video; QRL Photos	Tries: 2 Hezron Murgha; 1 Kyle Feldt*; Goals: 3 Kyle Feldt* (3 from 3); Penalty Goal: 1 Kyle Feldt*

BMD Kougari Oval
(Manly West, Brisbane, QLD)
Referee: Liam Nicholls

Skill360 Northern Pride: 1. Hezron Murgha – FB 2. Davin Crampton – WG 3. Ty Williams (c) – CE 4. Kyle Feldt* – CE 5. Semi Tadulala – WG 6. Shaun Nona – FE 7. Scott Moore* – HB 8. Ricky Thorby* – PR 9. Sam Obst – HK 10. Alex Starmer – PR 11. Ethan Lowe* – SR 12. Blake Leary* – SR 13. Ben Spina – LK
Interchange: 14. Jason Roos, 15. Noel Underwood, 16. Steve Snitch, 21. Aidan Smith.
* = Cowboys allocation.
Unavailable: Brett Anderson (cork).
Wynnum Manly Seagulls: 1. Jeriah Goodrich, 2. Peter Gubb, 3. Matt Grieve, 4. Jason Moon, 5. Nathanael Barnes, 6. Nathan Norford, 7. Matt Seamark, 8. Ben Shea, 9. Jake Granville, 10. Tim Natusch, 11. Tanu Wulf, 12. John Te Reo, 13. Luke Dalziel-Don (c).
Interchange: 14. Andrew Clayton, 15. Mitchell Dodds, 16. Billy Solah, 17. Saia Makisi.
Coach: Jon Buchanan.

Position	Round 10 - 2013	P	W	D	L	B	For	Against	Diff	Pts
1	Northern Pride	9	6	0	3	1	261	132	+129	14

ROUND 11: Intrust Super Cup 2013

Saturday
25 May 2013
18:30 AEST (UTC+10)

Northern Pride	30 – 10	Norths Devils
Tries: Ethan Lowe* 1 Hezron Murgha 1 Kyle Feldt* 1 Wayne Ulugia* 1 Ty Williams 1 Goals: Kyle Feldt* (5 from 5) 5	Cairns Post Report; QRL Report; Pride TV	Tries: 1 Jharal Yow Yeh; Daniel Ogden Goals: 1 Luke Samoa (1 from 2)

Barlow Park
(Severin Street, Parramatta Park, QLD)
Referee: Peter Gough

Skill360 Northern Pride: 1. Hezron Murgha – FB 2. Wayne Ulugia* – WG 3. Ty Williams (c) – CE 18. Kyle Feldt* – CE 5. Semi Tadulala – WG 6. Shaun Nona – FE 7. Sam Obst – HB 8. Davin Crampton – PR 9. Felise Kaufusi* – HK 10. Alex Starmer – PR 11. Ethan Lowe* – SR 12. Ben Spina – SR 13. Joel Riethmuller* – LK
Interchange: 14. Jason Roos, 15. Blake Leary*, 16. Steve Snitch, 21. Aidan Smith.
* = Cowboys allocation.
Unavailable: Brett Anderson (cork).
Norths Devils: 1. Daniel Ogden, 2. Dylan Galloway, 3. Luke Samoa, 4. Jharal Yow Yeh, 5. Tristan Lumley, 6. Matty Smith (c), 7. Angus Cameron, 8. Mark Vaiao, 9. Ben Sullivan, 10. James Geurtjens, 11. Nathan Lowrie, 12. Brendon Gibb, 13. Dan Beasley.
Interchange: 14. Krys Freeman, 15. Pat McPherson, 16. Jamie Muller, 17. Chris McLean, 18. James Sharkie.
Coach: Andrew Wynyard.
- Note: This was Jason Roos' 100th game for the Pride.

Position	Round 11 - 2013	P	W	D	L	B	For	Against	Diff	Pts
1	Northern Pride	10	7	0	3	1	291	142	+149	16

ROUND 12: Intrust Super Cup 2013

Sunday
2 June 2013
14:00 AEST (UTC+10)

Easts Tigers	8 – 24	Northern Pride
Tries: Junior Sa'u 1 Grant Giess 1 Goals: 0 ?? (0 from 2); Penalty Goal:	Cairns Post Preview; Pride Report; Pride Report; QRL Photos; Pride TV	Tries: 1 Wayne Ulugia*; 1 Kyle Feldt*; 2 Davin Crampton; Goals: 4 Kyle Feldt* (4 from 5)

Langlands Park
(Stones Corner, Brisbane, QLD)
Referee: Gavin Morris
Player of the Match: Channel 9/XXXX Man of the Match: Ben Spina

Skill360 Northern Pride: 1. Hezron Murgha – FB 2. Wayne Ulugia* – WG 3. Ty Williams (c) – CE 18. Kyle Feldt* – CE 5. Semi Tadulala – WG 6. Shaun Nona – FE 7. Sam Obst – HB 8. Alex Starmer – PR 9. Scott Moore* – HK 10. Felise Kaufusi* – PR 11. Davin Crampton – SR 12. Ben Spina – SR 13. Noel Underwood – LK
Interchange: 14. Jason Roos, 16. Steve Snitch, 20. Nick Dorante, 21. Aidan Smith.
* = Cowboys allocation.
Unavailable: Brett Anderson (cork).
Easts Tigers: 1. Hughie Stanley, 2. Eddie Tautali, 3. Junior Sa'u, 4. Shane Neumann, 5. Ryan Pooley, 6. Cody Walker, 7. Ben Hampton, 8. Steve Thorpe (c), 9. Tom Butterfield, 10. Mitch Garbutt, 11. Tim Glasby, 12. Kenny Bromwich, 13. Dane Hogan.
Interchange: 14. Matt Zgrajewski, 15. Brett Zgrajewski, 16. Adam Marr, 17. Grant Giess.
Coach: Craig Ingebrigtsen.
- Note: Broadcast live on Channel 9 with Matthew Thompson, Scott Sattler and Adrian Vowles as the commentary team.
  This was the Pride debut for Nick Dorante (Pride Player 094).

Position	Round 12 - 2013	P	W	D	L	B	For	Against	Diff	Pts
1	Northern Pride	11	8	0	3	1	315	150	+165	18

ROUND 13: Intrust Super Cup 2013

Saturday
8 June 2013
18:30 AEST (UTC+10)

Northern Pride	32 – 4	Tweed Heads Seagulls
Tries: Joel Riethmuller* 1 Brett Anderson 1 Scott Moore* 1 Hezron Murgha 1 Wayne Ulugia* 1 Davin Crampton 1 Goals: Kyle Feldt* (4 from 6) 4	Pride Preview; Cairns Post Report; QRL Report; Ballina Advocate Report; Pride TV	Tries: 1 Brandon Downey Goals: ?? (0 from 1)

Barlow Park
(Severin Street, Parramatta Park, QLD)
Referee: Robert Gallacher.

Skill360 Northern Pride: 1. Hezron Murgha – FB 2. Wayne Ulugia* – WG 3. Ty Williams (c) – CE 18. Kyle Feldt* – CE 5. Brett Anderson – WG 6. Shaun Nona – FE 7. Sam Obst – HB 8. Alex Starmer – PR 9. Scott Moore* – HK 10. Felise Kaufusi* – PR 11. Ethan Lowe* – SR 12. Ben Spina – SR 13. Joel Riethmuller* – LK
Interchange: 14. Jason Roos, 15. Noel Underwood, 16. Steve Snitch, 17. Davin Crampton.
* = Cowboys allocation.
Tweed Heads Seagulls: 1. Shaun Carney, 2. Brad Lees, 3. James Wood (c), 4. Matt Hundy, 5. Tom Merritt, 6. Michael Burgess, 7. Tim Maccan, 8. Josh Coyle, 9.Matt King (c), 10. Jake Leary, 11. Cory Blair, 12. Tom Kingston, 13. Chris Binge.
Interchange: 14. Marmin Barba, 15. Ayden Lee, 16. Aaron Cannings, 17. Sam Ross, Brandon Downey.
Coach: Aaron Zimmerle.

Position	Round 13 - 2013	P	W	D	L	B	For	Against	Diff	Pts
1	Northern Pride	12	9	0	3	1	347	154	+193	20

ROUND 14: Intrust Super Cup 2013

Sunday
16 June 2013
12:30 AEST (UTC+10)

Northern Pride	44 – 12	Ipswich Jets
Tries: Brett Anderson 3 Sam Obst 1 Hezron Murgha 2 Kyle Feldt* 1 Alex Starmer 1 Goals: Kyle Feldt* (6 from 8) 6 Penalty Goal:	Ipswich Reporter Preview; QRL Report; Queensland Times Report; QRL Video	Tries: 1 Jarrod McInally; 1 Donald Malone Goals: 1 Donald Malone (1 from 2); Penalty Goal: 1 Donald Malone

Barlow Park
(Severin Street, Parramatta Park, QLD)
Attendance: 16,182
Referee: Chris Butler

Skill360 Northern Pride: 1. Hezron Murgha – FB 2. Wayne Ulugia* – WG 3. Ty Williams (c) – CE 4. Brett Anderson – CE 5. Kyle Feldt* – WG 6. Shaun Nona – FE 7. Sam Obst – HB 8. Alex Starmer – PR 9. Scott Moore* – HK 10. Felise Kaufusi* – PR 11. Ethan Lowe* – SR 12. Davin Crampton – SR 13. Joel Riethmuller* – LK
Interchange: 14. Jason Roos, 15. Noel Underwood, 16. Ben Spina, 17. Steve Snitch.
* = Cowboys allocation.
Ipswich Jets: 1. Javarn White, 2. Troy O'Sullivan, 3. Donald Malone, 4. Brendon Marshall, 5. Tautalatasi Tasi, 6. Keiron Lander (c), 7. Ian Lacey, 8. Tyson Lofipo, 9. Matt Parcell, 10. Rowan Winterfield, 11. Nathaniel Neale, 12. Kurtis Lingwoodock, 13. Liam Capewell.
Interchange: 14. Jacob Ling, 15. Rod Griffin, 16. Slade King, 17. Michael Fisher, Jarrod McInally.
Coach: Ben Walker and Shane Walker.
- Note: This match was the top of the table QRL clash between the Pride (1st) and the Jets (2nd). It was played as the opener to the NRL Round 14 match between South Sydney Rabbitohs and the Gold Coast Titans, which the Rabbitohs won 30 – 24.

Position	Round 14 - 2013	P	W	D	L	B	For	Against	Diff	Pts
1	Northern Pride	13	10	0	3	1	391	166	+225	22

ROUND 15: Intrust Super Cup 2013

Sunday
23 June 2013
15:00 AEST (UTC+10)

Redcliffe Dolphins	16 – 32	Northern Pride
Tries: Zach Strasser 1 Liam Georgetown 1 Joe Bond 1 Goals: Liam Georgetown (2 from 3) 2	Pride Preview; Cairns Post Preview; Pride Report; QRL Video	Tries: 1 Shaun Nona; 2 Davin Crampton; 2 Hezron Murgha; 1 Brett Anderson; Goals: 4 Kyle Feldt* (4 from 5)

Dolphin Oval
(Klingner Road, Redcliffe, QLD)
Referee: Brett Suttor
Player of the Match: Channel 9/XXXX Man of the Match: Joel Riethmuller*

Skill360 Northern Pride: 1. Hezron Murgha – FB 18. Kyle Feldt* – WG 3. Davin Crampton – CE 4. Brett Anderson (c) – CE 5. Semi Tadulala – WG 6. Shaun Nona – FE 7. Sam Obst – HB 8. Alex Starmer – PR 9. Scott Moore* – HK 10. Felise Kaufusi* – PR 11. Ethan Lowe – SR 22. Blake Leary* – SR 13. Joel Riethmuller* – LK
Interchange: 14. Jason Roos, 16. Ben Spina, 17. Steve Snitch, 18. ?
* = Cowboys allocation
Unavailable: Ty Williams (fluid on knee).
Redcliffe Dolphins: 1. Joe Bond, 2. Delroy Berryman, 3. Marty Hatfield, 4. Paul Ivan, 5. Liam Georgetown, 6. Zach Strasser, 7. Maurice Kennedy, 8. Alex Simpson, 9. Chris Fox, 10. Petero Civoniceva (c), 11. Jake Marketo, 12. Sarafu Fatiaki, 13. Tom Murphy.
Interchange: 14. Tui Samoa, 15. Joe Bradley, 16. Tom Geraghty, 17. Jacob Mayer.

Coach: John Dixon

- Note: Broadcast live on Channel 9 with Matthew Thompson, Scott Sattler and Adrian Vowles as the commentary team.

Position	Round 15 - 2013	P	W	D	L	B	For	Against	Diff	Pts
1	Northern Pride	14	11	0	3	1	427	182	+245	24

ROUND 16: Intrust Super Cup 2013

Saturday
29 June 2013
18:30 AEST (UTC+10)

Northern Pride	38 – 12	CQ Capras
Tries: Davin Crampton 2 Ricky Thorby* 1 Ethan Lowe* 2 Semi Tadulala 1 Joel Riethmuller* 1 Goals: Shaun Nona (5 from 7) 5	Rockhampton Bulletin Preview; Cairns Post Report; Pride TV; QRL Video	Tries: 1 Josh Benjamin; 1 John Clayton Goals: 2 Brent Crisp (2 from 2)

Barlow Park
(Severin Street, Parramatta Park, QLD)
Referee: Nick Morel

Skill360 Northern Pride: 1. Hezron Murgha – FB 2. Wayne Ulugia* – WG 3. Davin Crampton – CE 4. Brett Anderson – CE 5. Semi Tadulala – WG 6. Shaun Nona – FE 7. Sam Obst – HB 8. Alex Starmer – PR 9. Jason Roos (c) – HK 10. Felise Kaufusi* – PR 11. Ethan Lowe* – SR 22. Blake Leary* – SR 13. Joel Riethmuller* – LK
Interchange: 14. Ryan Ghietti, 15. Ben Spina, 17. Ricky Thorby*, 21. Nick Dorante.
* = Cowboys allocation
Unavailable: Ty Williams (fluid on knee).
Central Queensland Capras: 1. Cameron Munster, 2. Anthony Flores, 3. Russell Webber, 4. Josh Benjamin, 5. Marco Delapena, 6. Brent Crisp, 7. Dean Blackman, 8. John Clayton, 9. Ian Webster, 10. Alan Rothery, 11. Simon Gregory, 12. Brent Williams, 13. Gavin Hiscox (c).
Interchange: 14. Darcy Etrich, 15. Sam Pierce, 16. Mick Esdale, 17. Guy Williams.
Coach: Jason Hetherington

Position	Round 16 - 2013	P	W	D	L	B	For	Against	Diff	Pts
1	Northern Pride	15	12	0	3	1	465	194	+271	26

ROUND 17: Intrust Super Cup 2013 - XXXX Men of League Rivalry Round

Sunday
7 July 2013
12:30 AEST (UTC+10)

Mackay Cutters	26 – 16	Northern Pride
Tries: Bureta Faraimo 1 Liam Taylor 1 Anthony Mitchell 1 Michael Morgan 1 Sam Hoare* 1 Goals: Liam Taylor 2 Kalifa Faifai Loa 1	Cairns Post Preview; Cutters Preview; Daily Mercury Preview; Cairns Post Report; QRL Report; QRL Photos; QRL Video	Tries: 1 Shaun Nona; 1 Ben Spina; 1 Joel Riethmuller* Goals: 2 Kyle Feldt* (2 from 3)

Virgin Australia Stadium
(Bridge Road, South Mackay, QLD)
Attendance: 6,700
Referee: Chris Butler
Player of the Match: Channel 9/XXXX Man of the Match: Anthony Mitchell

Skill360 Northern Pride: 1. Brent Oosen – FB 2. Wayne Ulugia* – WG 3. Ty Williams (c) – CE 4. Brett Anderson – CE 5. Semi Tadulala – WG 6. Shaun Nona – FE 7. Sam Obst – HB 8. Ben Spina – PR 9. Scott Moore* – HK 10. Felise Kaufusi* – PR 11. Ethan Lowe* – SR 12. Noel Underwood – SR 13. Joel Riethmuller* – LK
Interchange: 14. Jason Roos. 15. Davin Crampton. 16. Alex Starmer. 17. Aidan Smith, 18 Kyle Feldt*. – WG (One player to be omitted).
* = Cowboys allocation
Unavailable: Hezron Murgha (hamstring).
Mackay Cutters: 1. Liam Taylor, 2. Bureta Faraimo, 3. Curtis Rona*, 4. Kalifa Faifai Loa*, 5. David Milne, 6. Dan Murphy, 7. Matt Minto, 8. Sam Hoare*, 9. Anthony Mitchell, 10. Tyson Andrews, 11. Tyson Martin, 12. Chris Gesch, 13. Jardine Bobongie.
Interchange: 15. Dave Petersen, 16. Jason Schirnack, 17. Chris Grevsmuhl, 18. Dean Webster, 19. Karl Davies, Michael Morgan.
Coach: Kim Williams.
- Note: XXXX Men of League Rivalry Round.
  This match was played as the opener to the NRL Round 17 match between Canterbury Bankstown Bulldogs and the Newcastle Knights, which the Knights won 18–12.
  The Pride v Cutters match was broadcast on Channel 9 at 2.00pm (delayed telecast) with Matthew Thompson, Scott Sattler and Adrian Vowles as the commentary team.

Position	Round 17 - 2013	P	W	D	L	B	For	Against	Diff	Pts
1	Northern Pride	16	12	0	4	1	481	220	+261	26

ROUND 18: Intrust Super Cup 2013

Sunday
21 June 2013
15:00 AEST (UTC+10)

Norths Devils	6 – 38	Northern Pride
Tries: Namila Davui 1 Goals: Angus Cameron (1 from 1) 1	Pride Preview; Pride Report; QRL Video	Tries: 2 Semi Tadulala; 1 Kyle Feldt*; 3 Blake Leary*; 1 Davin Crampton; Goals: 5 Kyle Feldt* (5 from 7)

Albert Bishop Park
(Hedley Avenue, Nundah QLD)
Referee: Michael Wise
Player of the Match: Channel 9/XXXX:
Sam Obst

Skill360 Northern Pride: 1. Hezron Murgha – FB 18. Kyle Feldt* – WG 3. Ty Williams (c) – CE 4. Brett Anderson – CE 5. Semi Tadulala – WG 6. Robert Lui* – FE 7. Sam Obst – HB 8. Alex Starmer – PR 9. Scott Moore* – HK 10. Aidan Smith – PR 11. Noel Underwood – SR 12. Blake Leary* – SR 13. Davin Crampton – LK
Interchange: 14. Jason Roos, 15. Ben Spina, 16. Felise Kaufusi*, 17. Ryan Ghietti.
* = Cowboys allocation.
Norths Devils: 1. Daniel Ogden, 2. Dylan Galloway, 3. Luke Samoa, 4. Namila Davui, 5. Tristan Lumley, 6. Matty Smith (c), 7. Angus Cameron, 8. Nathan Cleaver, 9. Kurt Baptiste, 10. Mark Vaiao, 11. James Sharkie, 12. Brendan Gibb, 13. Pat McPherson.
Interchange: 14. Krys Freeman, 15. James Geurtjens, 16. Shaun Maloney, 17. Troyden Watene
Coach: Andrew Wynyard
- Note: Broadcast live on Channel 9 with Matthew Thompson, Scott Sattler and Adrian Vowles as the commentary team.

Position	Round 18 - 2013	P	W	D	L	B	For	Against	Diff	Pts
1	Northern Pride	17	13	0	4	1	519	226	+293	28

ROUND 19: Intrust Super Cup 2013

Saturday
27 July 2013
18:30 AEST (UTC+10)

Northern Pride	50 – 16	Sunshine Coast Sea Eagles
Tries: Wayne Ulugia* 2 Kyle Feldt* 1 Davin Crampton 1 Semi Tadulala 3 Aidan Smith 1 Brett Anderson 1 Goals: Kyle Feldt* (7 from 9) 7	Cairns Post Preview; Pride Preview; Cairns Post Report; Pride TV; QRL Video	Tries: 1 Rowan Klein; 1 Eli Wickham; 1 Callum Klein Goals: 2 Ryan Hansen (2 from 3)

Barlow Park
(Severin Street, Parramatta Park, QLD)
Referee: Nick Morel

Skill360 Northern Pride: 2. Wayne Ulugia* – FB 18. Kyle Feldt* – WG 3. Ty Williams (c) – CE 4. Brett Anderson – CE 5. Semi Tadulala – WG 6. Robert Lui* – FE 7. Sam Obst – HB 22. Ethan Lowe* – PR 9. Scott Moore* – HK 15. Ben Spina – PR 11. Noel Underwood – SR 12. Blake Leary* – SR 13. Davin Crampton – LK
Interchange: 14. Jason Roos, 10. Aidan Smith, 20. Brent Oosen, 17. Ryan Ghietti.
* = Cowboys allocation.
Unavailable: Alex Starmer (ribs), Ben Laity, Steve Snitch, Felise Kaufusi* (ankle), Hezron Murgha.
Sunshine Coast Sea Eagles: 1. Kyle Van Klaveren, 2. Rowan Klein, 3. Jye Ballinger, 4. Callum Klein (c), 5. Dale Middleton, 6. Eli Wickham, 7. Justin Otto, 8. Martin Cordwell, 9. Jay Lobwein, 10. Ryan Hansen, 11. Jacob Samoa, 12. Kristian Wanka, 13. Mboya Adams.
Interchange: 14. Brenton Stonier, 15. Steve Tunnicliffe, 16. Sam Bernstrom, 17. Zac Litherland.
Coach: Dave Cordwell.
- Note: This was Ryan Ghietti's 50th appearance for the Pride (and 56th ISC game overall).

Position	Round 19 - 2013	P	W	D	L	B	For	Against	Diff	Pts
1	Northern Pride	18	14	0	4	1	569	242	+327	30

ROUND 20: Intrust Super Cup 2013 - Country Week

Sunday
4 August 2013
14:30 AEST (UTC+10)

Souths Logan Magpies	0 – 42	Northern Pride
Tries: Goals:	QRL Preview; Cairns Post Preview; Cairns Post Preview; Pride Report; QRL Video	Tries: 1 Hezron Murgha; 1 Davin Crampton; 1 Brett Anderson; 1 Ty Williams; 1 Semi Tadulala; 1 Ethan Lowe*; 1 Blake Leary*; 1 Ryan Ghietti; Goals: 5 Shaun Nona (5 from 8)

Jilara Oval
(Yarrabah, QLD)
Referee: Michael Gordon

Skill360 Northern Pride: 1. Hezron Murgha – FB 2. Wayne Ulugia* – WG 3. Ty Williams (c) – CE 4. Brett Anderson – CE 5. Semi Tadulala – WG 6. Robert Lui* – FE 7. Sam Obst – HB 8. Ricky Thorby* – PR 9. Jason Roos – HK 10. Ben Spina – PR 11. Ethan Lowe* – SR 12. Noel Underwood – SR 13. Blake Leary* – LK
Interchange: 14. Ryan Ghietti, 15. Aidan Smith, 16. Davin Crampton, 17. Felise Kaufusi*. 18 Brent Oosen. (One player to be omitted).
* = Cowboys allocation
Unavailable: Alex Starmer (ribs).
Souths Logan Magpies: 1. Ben Falcone, 2. Ramon Filipine, 3. Nick Doyle, 4. Josh Damen, 5. Luke Archer, 6. Ben Cronin, 7. Rhys Jacks, 8. Mat Pitman, 9. Travis Waddell, 10. Andrew Edwards, 11. Chris Faust, 12. Tulson Caird, 13. Phil Dennis (c).
Interchange: 14. Ben Thorburn, 15. Rez Phillips, 16. Sam Gardel, 17. Zac Lemburg.
Coach: Mark Beaumont.

Position	Round 20 - 2013	P	W	D	L	B	For	Against	Diff	Pts
1	Northern Pride	19	15	0	4	1	611	242	+369	32

ROUND 21: Intrust Super Cup 2013

10–11 August 2013

Northern Pride	BYE

Position	Round 21 - 2013	P	W	D	L	B	For	Against	Diff	Pts
1	Northern Pride	19	15	0	4	2	611	242	+369	34

ROUND 22: Intrust Super Cup 2013

Sunday
18 August 2013
14:10 AEST (UTC+10)

Northern Pride	44 – 12	Burleigh Bears
Tries: Semi Tadulala 3 Ethan Lowe* 1 Justin Castellaro 1 Davin Crampton 1 Felise Kaufusi* 1 Wayne Ulugia* 1 Goals: Shaun Nona (6 from 8) 6	Pride Preview; Pride Preview; Pride Preview; JD on Bay FM; Cairns Post Report; QRL Report; QRL Video	Tries: 1 Steve Michaels*; 1 Anthony Don* Goals: 2 Jordan Rankin* (2 from 2)

Barlow Park
(Severin Street, Parramatta Park, QLD)
Referee: Michael Gordon
Player of the Match: Channel 9/XXXX Man of the Match: Justin Castellaro

Skill360 Northern Pride: 2. Wayne Ulugia* – FB 19. Justin Castellaro – WG 3. Ty Williams (c) – CE 4. Brett Anderson – CE 5. Semi Tadulala – WG 6. Shaun Nona – FE 7. Sam Obst – HB 22. Ben Spina – PR 9. Scott Moore* – HK 10. Felise Kaufusi* – PR 12. Blake Leary* – SR 15. Brent Oosen – SR 13. Davin Crampton – LK
Interchange: 8. Scott Bolton*, 14. Jason Roos, 11. Ethan Lowe*, 16. Steve Snitch.
* = Cowboys allocation.
Unavailable: Alex Starmer (ribs), Noel Underwood, Hezron Murgha (knee).
Burleigh Bears: 1. Jordan Rankin*, 2. Steve Michaels*, 3. Jordan Atkins*, 4. Jamie Anderson, 5. Dan Kerr, 6. Tyler Chadburn, 7. Todd Seymour, 8. Luke Page, 9. Sam Meskell, 10. Shane Gray*, 11. Brendan Hoare, 12. Tyron Haynes, 13. Darren Griffiths (c).
Interchange: 14. Tommy Gordon, 15. Jamie Judge, 16. Louis Fanene, 17. Nick Harrold, Anthony Don*.
* = Gold Coast Titans allocation.
Coach: Carl Briggs.
- Note: Broadcast live on Channel 9 with Matthew Thompson, Scott Sattler and Adrian Vowles as the commentary team.
  This was Brett Anderson's 100th game in the QRL.
  This Round 22 win secured the minor-premiership for the Northern Pride with 36 points at the top of the table.
  This was the Pride debut for Jordan Biondi-Odo (Pride Player 095).

Position	Round 22 - 2013	P	W	D	L	B	For	Against	Diff	Pts
1	Northern Pride	20	16	0	4	2	655	254	+401	36

ROUND 23: Intrust Super Cup 2013

Saturday
24 August 2013
18:30 AEST (UTC+10)

Northern Pride	36 – 16	Easts Tigers
Tries: Justin Castellaro 1 Ty Williams 1 Semi Tadulala 1 Blake Leary* 1 Davin Crampton 1 Steve Snitch 1 Goals: Justin Castellaro (6 from 6) 6	Tigers Report; Cairns Post Report; QRL Report; Pride TV; QRL Video	Tries: 2 Maeli Seve; 1 Leon Panapa Goals: 2 Cody Walker (2 from 3)

Barlow Park
(Severin Street, Parramatta Park, QLD)
Referee: Chris Anderson

Skill360 Northern Pride: 1. Jordan Biondi-Odo – FB 19. Justin Castellaro – WG 3. Ty Williams (c) – CE 4. Brett Anderson – CE 5. Semi Tadulala – WG 17. Felise Kaufusi* – FE 7. Sam Obst – HB 8. Alex Starmer – PR 9. Scott Moore* – HK 10. Aidan Smith – PR 11. Blake Leary* – SR 12. Davin Crampton – SR 13. Ben Spina – LK
Interchange: 14. Jason Roos, 15. Steve Snitch, 18. Ryan Ghietti, 20. Brent Oosen.
* = Cowboys allocation.
Unavailable: Hezron Murgha (knee), Noel Underwood.
Easts Tigers: 1. Jack Joass, 2. Ryan Pooley, 3. Jacob Paul, 4. Shane Neumann, 5. Maeli Seve, 6. Cody Walker, 7. Ben Hampton, 8. Steven Thorpe (c), 9. Tom Butterfield, 10. Mitch Garbutt, 11. Dane Hogan, 12. Tim Glasby, 13. Matthew Zgrajewski.
Interchange: 14. Brett Zgrajewski, 15. Liufau Hala, 16. Leon Panapa, 17. Grant Giess.
Coach: Craig Ingebrigtsen.
- Note: This was the Pride debut for Tom Hancock (Pride Player 96).

Position	Round 23 - 2013	P	W	D	L	B	For	Against	Diff	Pts
1	Northern Pride	22	17	0	4	2	687	271	+/-416	38

ROUND 24 Intrust Super Cup 2013

Saturday
31 August 2013
18:30 AEST (UTC+10)

Northern Pride	16 – 26	Wynnum Manly Seagulls
Tries: Semi Tadulala 1 Blake Leary* 1 Ben Spina 1 Goals: Shaun Nona (2 from 3) 2 Penalty Goal:	Pride Preview; QRL Report; Pride Report; Pride TV; QRL Video	Tries: 1 Jason Moon; 2 Jake Granville; 1 Tim Natusch; Goals: 4 Matt Seamark (4 from 4); Penalty Goal: 1 Matt Seamark

Barlow Park
(Severin Street, Parramatta Park, QLD)
Referee: Chris Anderson.

Skill360 Northern Pride: 1. Jordan Biondi-Odo – FB 2. Justin Castellaro – WG 3. Davin Crampton – CE 4. Brett Anderson (c) – CE 5. Semi Tadulala – WG 19. Shaun Nona – FE 7. Ryan Ghietti – HB 8. Alex Starmer – PR 9. Scott Moore* – HK 10. Aidan Smith – PR 11. Ethan Lowe* – SR 12. Steve Snitch – SR 13. Blake Leary* – LK
Interchange: 14. Jason Roos, 15. Ben Spina, 16. Brent Oosen, 17. Tom Hancock.
* = Cowboys allocation.
Unavailable: Hezron Murgha (knee), Ty Williams (quad), Sam Obst.
Wynnum-Manly Seagulls: 1. Corey Norman, 2. Peter Gubb, 3. Matt Grieve, 4. Jason Moon, 5. Nathanael Barnes, 6. Jacob Fauid, 7. Matt Seamark, 8. Ben Shea, 9. Jake Granville, 10. Tim Natusch, 11. Tanu Wulf, 12. John Te Reo, 13. Luke Dalziel-Don (c).
Interchange: 14. Junior Togia, 15. Andrew Clayton, 16. Saia Makisi, 17. Graham Clark.
Coach: Jon Buchanan.
- Note: If the Pride had conceded 14 points or less, it would have been a new ISC record for the best defense in a season. However, the Pride conceded 26 points and the record remained with the Redcliffe Dolphins.

Position	Round 24 - 2013	P	W	D	L	B	For	Against	Diff	Pts
1	Northern Pride	22	17	0	5	2	703	296	+/-407	38

=== 2013 Ladder ===
2013 Queensland Cup season
	Team	Pld	W	D	L	B	PF	PA	PD	Pts
1	Northern Pride	22	17	0	5	2	703	296	+407	38
2	Mackay Cutters	22	14	2	6	2	577	483	+94	34
3	Easts Tigers	22	13	0	9	2	628	371	+257	30
4	Wynnum Manly Seagulls	22	13	0	9	2	521	452	+69	30
5	Ipswich Jets	22	12	1	9	2	494	520	-26	29
6	Norths Devils	22	11	2	9	2	507	571	-64	28
7	Redcliffe Dolphins	18	10	3	9	2	537	413	+124	27
8	Tweed Heads Seagulls	22	11	1	10	2	458	494	-36	27
9	Souths Logan Magpies	22	11	0	11	2	415	554	-139	26
10	Central Capras	22	7	1	14	2	462	569	-107	19
11	Burleigh Bears	22	5	2	15	2	434	548	-114	16
12	Sunshine Coast Sea Eagles	22	2	0	20	2	325	790	-465	8

Source: qrl.com

==== Northern Pride (regular season 2013) ====
- Win = 17 (9 of 11 home games, 8 of 11 away games)
- Loss = 5 (2 of 11 home games, 3 of 11 away games)

Round	1	2	3	4	5	6	7	8	9	10	11	12	13	14	15	16	17	18	19	20	21	22	23	24
Result	W	W	W	L	W	L	B	W	L	W	W	W	W	W	W	L	W	W	W	W	B	W	W	L
Ground	H	A	H	A	A	A	B	H	A	A	H	A	H	H	A	H	A	A	H	A	B	H	H	H

Source: https://web.archive.org/web/20120916041305/http://www.qrl.com.au/
A = Away; H = Home; B = Bye; W = Win; D = Draw; L = Loss

== Finals Series ==
Qualifying / Elimination Finals
2	Mackay	18
3	Easts	31
4	Wynnum Manly	6
5	Ipswich	33

Major / Minor Semi-finals
1	Northern Pride	16
Easts	29
Mackay	27
Ipswich	16

Preliminary Final
Northern Pride	6
Mackay	20

Grand Final
Easts	20
Mackay	27

Finals Week 2 - Major Semi-Final

Sunday
15 September 2013
13:35 AEST (UTC+10)

Northern Pride	16 – 29	Easts Tigers
Tries: Semi Tadulala 1 Davin Crampton 1 Kyle Feldt* 1 Goals: Ethan Lowe* 2 (2 from 3)	Cairns Post Preview; Cairns Post Preview; Pride Preview; Pride Preview; Pride Report; QRL Video	Tries: 1 Maeli Seve; 1 Cody Walker; 1 Matthew Zgrajewski; 1 Shane Neumann; 1 Tim Glasby; Goals: 4 Cody Walker (4 from 5); Field Goals: 1 Walker

Barlow Park
(Severin Street, Parramatta Park, QLD)
Referee: Chris Anderson

Skill360 Northern Pride: 1. Davin Crampton – FB 2. Kyle Feldt* – WG 3. Ty Williams (c) – CE 4. Brett Anderson – CE 5. Semi Tadulala – WG 6. Ryan Ghietti – FE 7. Sam Obst – HB 8. Alex Starmer – PR 9. Scott Moore* – HK 10. Felise Kaufusi* – PR 11. Blake Leary* – SR 12. Ethan Lowe* – SR 13. Ben Spina – LK
Interchange: 14. Jason Roos, 16. Steve Snitch, 20. Ricky Thorby*, 22. Noel Underwood.
* = Cowboys allocation.
Unavailable: Hezron Murgha.
Easts Tigers: 1. Jack Joass, 2. Maeli Seve, 3. Junior Sa'u, 4. Shane Neumann, 5. Mahe Fonua, 6. Cody Walker, 7. Ben Hampton, 8. Steven Thorpe (c), 9. Tom Butterfield, 10. Mitch Garbutt, 11. Matthew Zgrajewski, 12. Tim Glasby, 13. Leon Panapa.
Interchange: 14. Adam Marr, 15. Liufau Hala, 16. Isaac Kaufmann, 17. Grant Giess.
Coach: Craig Ingebrigtsen.
- Note: This was Ty Williams last home game after he announced his retirement at the end of the 2013 season.
  Broadcast live on Channel 9 with Matthew Thompson, Scott Sattler and Adrian Vowles as the commentary team.

Finals Week 3 - Preliminary Final

Sunday
22 September 2013
14:00 AEST (UTC+10)

Northern Pride	6 – 20	Mackay Cutters
Tries: Semi Tadulala 1 Goals: Shaun Nona 1 (1 from 1)	Cairns Post Preview; Cairns Post Preview; Townsville Bulletin Preview; Townsville Bulletin Preview; QRL Preview; Cairns Post Report	Tries: 1 Liam Taylor; 1 Bureta Faraimo; 1 Kalifa Faifai Loa; 1 Jason Taumalolo; Goals: 2 Liam Taylor

Langlands Park
(Stones Corner, Brisbane, QLD)
Referee: Clayton Sharpe
Player of the Match: Jason Taumalolo

Skill360 Northern Pride: 1. Wayne Ulugia* – FB 2. Justin Castellaro – WG 3. Ty Williams (c) – CE 4. Brett Anderson – CE 5. Semi Tadulala – WG 6. Shaun Nona – FE 7. Sam Obst – HB 8. Alex Starmer – PR 9. Jason Roos – HK 10. Aidan Smith – PR 11. Blake Leary* – SR 12. Davin Crampton – SR 13. Ben Spina – LK
Interchange: 15. Noel Underwood, 16. Steve Snitch, 17. Felise Kaufusi*, 18. Ethan Lowe*.
* = Cowboys allocation.
Unavailable: Hezron Murgha, Kyle Feldt* (ankle).
Mackay Cutters: 1. Liam Taylor, 2. Bureta Faraimo, 3. Michael Koko, 4. Kalifa Faifai Loa, 5. David Milne, 6. Dan Murphy, 7. Matt Minto, 8. Tyson Andrews, 9. Anthony Mitchell, 10. Sam Hoare, 11. Dean Webster, 12. Chris Gesch, 13. Jardine Bobongie (c).
Interchange: 15. Michael Morgan, 16. Kelvin Nielsen, 17. Jason Taumalolo, 18. Karl Davies, 19. Matt Constantinou, 20. Pulou Vaituutuu.
Coach: Kim Williams.
- Note: Broadcast live on Channel 9 with Matthew Thompson, Scott Sattler and Adrian Vowles as the commentary team.

== 2013 Northern Pride players ==
Pride player	Appearances	Tries	Goals	Field goals	Pts
Aidan Smith	14	1	0	0	4
Alex Starmer	20	1	0	0	4
Ben Laity	3	0	0	0	0
Ben Spina	24	4	0	0	16
Brent Oosen	8	0	0	0	0
Brett Anderson)	20	11	0	0	44
Davin Crampton	23	19	0	0	76
Hezron Murgha	17	14	0	0	56
Jason Roos	16	0	0	0	0
Jordan Biondi-Odo	2	0	0	0	0
Justin Castellaro	4	2	6	0	20
Mervyn Walker	1	1	0	0	4
Nick Dorante	2	0	0	0	0
Noel Underwood	14	0	0	0	0
Ryan Ghietti	13	2	0	1	9
Sam Obst	23	5	0	0	20
Semi Tadulala	20	15	0	0	60
Shaun Nona	17	2	40	0	88
Steve Snitch	16	1	0	0	4
Tom Hancock	1	0	0	0	0
Ty Williams	20	7	0	0	28

=== North Queensland Cowboys who played for the Pride in 2013 ===
Cowboys player	Appearances	Tries	Goals	Field goals	Pts
Blake Leary*	16	9	0	0	36
Ethan Lowe*	20	8	4	0	40
Felise Kaufusi*	19	1	0	0	4
Joel Riethmuller*	9	3	0	0	12
Kyle Feldt*	13	8	52	0	136
Ray Thompson*	1	0	0	0	0
Ricky Thorby*	11	3	0	0	12
Robert Lui*	6	2	0	0	8
Scott Bolton*	3	1	0	0	4
Scott Moore*	15	1	0	0	4
Wayne Ulugia*	17	9	0	0	36

== 2013 Televised Games ==
=== Channel Nine ===
In August 2012 as part of the historic $1 billion five-year broadcasting agreement with Nine and Fox Sports, the Australian Rugby League Commission confirmed that Intrust Super Cup matches would continue to be televised by Channel 9 until 2018. One match a week will be shown live across Queensland at 2.00pm (AEST) on Sunday afternoons on Channel 9, WIN Television (RTQ), in remote areas on Imparja Television and in Papua New Guinea on Kundu 2 TV. The 2013 commentary team was Peter Psaltis, Paul Green, Matthew Thompson, Scott Sattler and Adrian Vowles.

In 2013 the Pride appeared in eight televised games:

- Round 2: Northern Pride beat Burleigh Bears 24-22 at Pizzey Park, Miami, Gold Coast.
- Round 12: Northern Pride beat Easts Tigers 24-8 at Langlands Park, Stones Corner, Brisbane.
- Round 15: Northern Pride beat Redcliffe Dolphins 36-16 at Dolphin Oval, Redcliffe.
- Round 17: Northern Pride lost to Mackay Cutters 26-16 (played at 12:30pm, and telecast delayed to 2.00pm) from Virgin Australia Stadium, Mackay.
- Round 18: Northern Pride beat Norths Devils 38-6 at Bishop Park, Nundah.
- 6: Northern Pride beat Burleigh Bears 44-12 at Barlow Park, Cairns.
- Major Semi-Final: Northern Pride lost to Easts Tigers 16-29 at Barlow Park, Cairns.
- Preliminary Final: Northern Pride lost to Mackay Cutters 6-20 at Langlands Park, Stones Corner, Brisbane.

=== Live Streaming ===
In 2013, all matches (including pre-season trials but excluding matches broadcast live by Channel Nine) were streamed live through the Pride website, with access granted exclusively to Pride members. Video production was by Studio Productions and the commentary team was WIN TV's Adam Jackson and Pride U-18s coach, Cameron 'Spilla' Miller.
