= Sayf El Arab =

American-bred Thoroughbred racehorse

- Sire: Drone
- Grandsire: Sir Gaylord
- Dam: Make Plans
- Damsire: Go Marching
- Sex: Stallion
- Foaled: 12 February 1980
- Country: United States
- Colour: Bay
- Breeder: Walter Ferrell
- Owner: Moufid Dabaghi; Mrs P L Yong
- Trainer: Bill O'Gorman
- Record: 21: 4-4-1

Major wins
- King's Stand Stakes (1983); Quail Stakes (1984)

Awards
- Timeform rating 110 (1982), 127 (1983), 120 (1984)

Sayf El Arab (12 February 1980 – after 1998) was an American-bred, British-trained Thoroughbred racehorse and sire. A specialist sprinter he won four of his twenty-one races in a track career which lasted from April 1982 until August 2014. After being bought cheaply as a yearling he showed promising form as a juvenile in 1982 as he won two of his seven races. In the following year he was well beaten in his first three starts but then recorded an upset victory in the King's Stand Stakes at Royal Ascot. In 1984, he won once in seven races and finished third in his attempt to repeat his win in the King's Stand. He was retired to stud at the end of the year and had moderate success as a breeding stallion.

== Background ==
Sayf El Arab was a "small, attractive" bay horse with no white markings bred in Kentucky by Walter Ferrell. As a yearling he was consigned to the Keeneland sales in September 1981 and was bought for $37,000 by Fred Purman. The colt entered the ownership of Moufid Dabaghi and was sent to England where he entered training with Bill O'Gorman at Newmarket, Suffolk.

Sayf El Arab was sired by Drone, a Kentucky-bred stallion who was undefeated in four races in a brief track career before retiring to stud after a career-ending injury. He sired several other major winners including Lets Don't Fight (Arlington Futurity) but was best known as the broodmare sire of the Kentucky Derby winners Charismatic and Grindstone. Sayf El Arab's dam Make Plans showed little racing ability but became a successful broodmare, producing several other winners including the Palace House Stakes winner Monde Bleu. She was a granddaughter of Our Patrice, a half-sister of the Brooklyn Handicap winner Palestinian.

== Racing career ==
=== 1982: two-year-old season ===
After finishing fourth on his racecourse debut over five furlongs Sayf El Arab recorded his first success when odds-on favourite for a minor race over the same distance at Newmarket Racecourse in May. He was then stepped up in class for the National Stakes in June and finished second of the five runners, beaten a head by Krayyan. He was later found to have sustained minor fracture to his cannon bone which affected his form for the rest of the season. After being beaten in his next two starts over six furlongs, Sayf El Arab was dropped back in trip for the five furlong Highflyer Stakes at Thirsk Racecourse in September. Equipped with blinkers for the first time he won by a length from Jonacris, who was carrying twelve pounds more. He ended the season bay finishing fourth in a race over five furlongs.

=== 1983: three-year-old season ===
Sayf El Arab's form in the spring of 1983 was undistinguished although his trainer pointed out that he was not suited to the prevailing soft ground: he finished unplaced in the Quail Stakes at Kempton Park in April, the Palace House Stakes at Newmarket and the Prix de Saint-Georges at Longchamp Racecourse in May. The colt raced much firmer ground conditions and was re-fitted with blinkers when he was stepped up to Group One class for the first time for the King's Stand Stakes at Royal Ascot. Ridden by the lightweight Myrddin "Taffy" Thomas he started a 33/1 outsider whilst his stablemate On Stage was made the 11/4 favourite in a sixteen-runner field. The other runners included Fearless Lad, Soba (Stewards' Cup), Salieri (Mill Reef Stakes), Kind Music (Prix du Gros Chêne), Krayyan, Jonacris, Touch Boy (Portland Handicap), Chellaston Park (runner-up in 1982) and Prince Reymo (Windsor Castle Stakes). Sayf El Arab started quickly, took an early lead and never looked in any danger of defeat and drew away in the final furlong to win by three lengths from Soba with On Stage in third place. He was the longest-priced winner of the race since Squander Bug in 1948 and enabled Bill O'Gorman to emulate his father Paddy who had trained the winner in 1958 and 1963.

After an absence of well over two months, Sayf El Arab was tried over six furlongs in the Haydock Sprint Cup but after going well for most of the way he tired in the closing stages and finished fifth of the six runners behind Habibti. Five days later he returned to the minimum distance for the Scarbrough Stakes at Doncaster Racecourse and finished fifth behind Soba. He ended his season in the Prix de l'Abbaye at Longchamp on 2 October in which he started a 30/1 outsider and ran accordingly, finishing sixth of seven behind Habibti.

=== 1984: four-year-old season ===
After running unplaced on his first run of 1984, Sayf El Arab won the Quail Stakes at Kempton in April by a length from El Gazebo, recording his first and only victory over six furlongs. He was then matched against Habibti in the Leisure Stakes at Lingfield Park in early June and was beaten a length into second place by the filly. At Royal Ascot two weeks later the blinkers were re-applied as the colt attempted to repeat his 1983 success in the King's Stand Stakes. After setting a "scorching" pace in the early running he was overtaken but held on to finish third behind Habibti and Anita's Prince. In July he was sent to Ireland for the Phoenix Sprint Stakes at Phoenix Park Racecourse and dead-heated for second place behind the three-year-old filly Princess Tracy. In his two remaining races he finished a close-up fifth behind Celestial Dancer in the Prix de Meautry at Deauville Racecourse and then ran poorly when unplaced behind the Irish mare Committed in the William Hill Sprint Championship at York Racecourse in August.

== Assessment and awards ==
In 1982, the independent Timeform organisation gave Sayf El Arab a rating of 110, 23 pounds inferior to their top two-year-old Diesis, and commented that he appeared "barely to stay 6f". In the British Free Handicap he was more highly regarded, being placed fourteen pounds behind Diesis with a weight of 119 pounds. In the following year he was rated 127 by Timeform, nine pounds behind their best sprinter Habibti whilst in the official International Classification he was rated eleven pound inferior to the top-rated three-year-old Shareef Dancer. In their annual Racehorses of 1983 described him as a horse capable of winning more good races but one who could not be relied upon to reproduce his best form. His Timeform rating dropped to 120 in 1984, placing him eleven pounds below their best sprinter Chief Singer.

== Stud record ==
After his retirement from racing, Sayf El Arab began his career as a breeding stallion at the Woodditton Stud in Newmarket where he stood at an initial fee of £4,000. He sired two horses who won Group race winners in Italy namely Flaming Sword and Manoftheyear, both of whom won the Group Three Premio Primi Passi. He sired numerous other winners including El Yasaf (Listed race winner), Vintage Only (second in the Gimcrack Stakes), China Castle (winner of 26 races) and Nineacres (14 wins). He spent his later stud career in Italy where his last recorded foal was born in 1999.

== Pedigree ==
Pedigree of Sayf El Arab (USA), bay stallion, 1980
Sire Drone (USA) 1966	Sir Gaylord (USA); 1959	Turn-To	Royal Charger
Sire Drone (USA) 1966	Sir Gaylord (USA); 1959	Turn-To	Source Sucree
Sire Drone (USA) 1966	Sir Gaylord (USA); 1959	Somethingroyal	Princequillo
Sire Drone (USA) 1966	Sir Gaylord (USA); 1959	Somethingroyal	Imperatrice
Sire Drone (USA) 1966	Cap and Bells (USA); 1958	Tom Fool	Menow
Sire Drone (USA) 1966	Cap and Bells (USA); 1958	Tom Fool	Gaga
Sire Drone (USA) 1966	Cap and Bells (USA); 1958	Ghanzi	Mahmoud
Sire Drone (USA) 1966	Cap and Bells (USA); 1958	Ghanzi	Sun Miss
Dam Make Plans (USA) 1971	Go Marching (USA); 1965	Princequillo	Prince Rose
Dam Make Plans (USA) 1971	Go Marching (USA); 1965	Princequillo	Cosquilla
Dam Make Plans (USA) 1971	Go Marching (USA); 1965	Leallah	Nasrullah
Dam Make Plans (USA) 1971	Go Marching (USA); 1965	Leallah	Lea Lark
Dam Make Plans (USA) 1971	Sister Antoine (USA); 1957	Royal Serenade	Royal Charger
Dam Make Plans (USA) 1971	Sister Antoine (USA); 1957	Royal Serenade	Pasquinade
Dam Make Plans (USA) 1971	Sister Antoine (USA); 1957	Our Patrice	Bull Lea
Dam Make Plans (USA) 1971	Sister Antoine (USA); 1957	Our Patrice	Dolly Whisk (Family:4-r)

- Sayf El Arab was inbred 3 × 4 to Princequillo, meaning that this stallion appears in both the third and the fourth generations of her pedigree. He was also inbred 4 × 4 to Royal Charger.
