= Second Set (horse) =

Irish-bred Thoroughbred racehorse

- Sire: Alzao
- Grandsire: Lyphard
- Dam: Merriment
- Damsire: Go Marching
- Sex: Stallion
- Foaled: 28 April 1988
- Country: Ireland
- Colour: Bay
- Breeder: J P and M Mangan
- Owner: Richard L. Duchossois
- Trainer: Luca Cumani; David L MacLean
- Record: 16: 3-2-2
- Earnings: £219,672

Major wins
- Sussex Stakes (1991)

Second Set (28 April 1988 – 22 February 2008) was an Irish-bred British-trained Thoroughbred racehorse and sire. Unraced as a two-year-old he won two minor races in the spring of 1991 and then recorded his biggest success when winning the Group One Sussex Stakes in July. He showed high-class form without winning as a four-year-old but his form deteriorated when he raced without success in North America. He retired from racing to become a breeding stallion and spent most of his stud career in Germany. He had limited success as a sire of winners and died in 2008 at the age of twenty.

== Background ==
Second Set was a bay horse with a white star and two white socks bred in Ireland by J. P. and M. Mangan. He was sired by Alzao, a son of Lyphard who never won above Group Three level, but became a successful breeding stallion, his progeny including Maraahel (Hardwicke Stakes), Shahtoush and Alborada. Second Set's dam Merriment was a descendant of The Oaks winner Pennycomequick, making her a distant relative of the Kentucky Derby winner Pensive.

The colt was acquired by the American businessman Richard L. Duchossois and sent into training with Luca Cumani at the Bedford House stable in Newmarket, Suffolk. He was ridden in all of his European races by Frankie Dettori.

== Racing career ==
=== 1991: three-year-old season ===
Second Set made a successful racecourse debut in a seven furlong maiden race at Newmarket Racecourse on 4 May 1991, leading from the start and winning by three and a half lengths from the Dick Hern-trained Claret. Three weeks later he started 8/13 favorite for the Sydney Sandon Stakes at Haydock Park. Dettori again sent the colt into the lead from start and won by two and a half lengths from Claret, with Arokat finishing last of the three runners.

Second Set was moved up sharply in class to contest the Group One St James's Palace Stakes at Royal Ascot on 18 June and started the 4/1 third favourite behind Marju and the French-trained Acteur Francais. After being restrained by Dettori in the early stages he stayed on well in the straight and finished second, a head behind the winner Marju. On 31 July, Second Set was matched against older horses for the first time in the Sussex Stakes at Goodwood Racecourse. The filly Shadayid was made favourite ahead of Mystiko, with Second Set next in the betting on 5/1. The other runners included Priolo, Star of Gdansk (third in The Derby), Green Line Express (runner-up in the race for the last two years) and Sikeston (a multiple Group One winner in Italy). After turning into the straight in fourth place, Second Set took the lead two furlongs from the finish and stayed on well to win by one and a half lengths and a short head from Shadayid and Priolo.

In September, Second Set started 3/1 favourite for the Queen Elizabeth II Stakes at Ascot, but finished fourth of the nine runners behind Selkirk, Kooyonga and Shadayid. On his final appearance of the season, the colt was sent to Churchill Downs to contest the Breeders' Cup Mile on 2 November, but made no impact, finishing twelfth of the fourteen runners behind Opening Verse.

=== 1992: four-year-old season ===
Second Set raced five times as a four-year-old in 1992 without winning but ran well in several major races. On his first race of the season he was beaten a head by Lahib in the Queen Anne Stakes at Royal Ascot when conceding six pounds to the winner and then finished third, beaten less than a length, behind Marling and Selkirk in the Sussex Stakes. He was then moved up in distance for the Arlington Million on 6 September and finished unplaced behind the Frenc-trained five-year-old Dear Doctor. On his return to Europe in autumn he finished fifth behind Lahib in the Queen Elizabeth II Stakes and third to Selkirk in the Challenge Stakes.

=== 1993: five-year-old season ===
In 1993 Second Set was transferred to race in the United States where he was trained by David MacLean. He failed to recapture his European form and ran unplaced in all five of his starts. He ended his career by finishing fifth in an allowance race at Arlington in July.

== Stud record ==
Second Set was retired from racing and returned to Europe to become a breeding stallion. He stood at the Castle Hyde Stud in Ireland for a season before moving to Germany in 1995 where he was based at Gestut Zoppenbroich. He was not a success at stud, with the best of his offspring being the German Group Three winners Areias (Badener Sprint-Cup), Willingly (Fürstenberg-Rennen). He developed severe pneumonia and was euthanized on 22 February 2008.

== Pedigree ==
Pedigree of Second Set (IRE), bay stallion, 1988
Sire Alzao (USA) 1980	Lyphard (USA); 1969	Northern Dancer	Nearctic
Sire Alzao (USA) 1980	Lyphard (USA); 1969	Northern Dancer	Natalma
Sire Alzao (USA) 1980	Lyphard (USA); 1969	Goofed	Court Martial
Sire Alzao (USA) 1980	Lyphard (USA); 1969	Goofed	Barra
Sire Alzao (USA) 1980	Lady Rebecca (GB); 1971	Sir Ivor	Sir Gaylord
Sire Alzao (USA) 1980	Lady Rebecca (GB); 1971	Sir Ivor	Attica
Sire Alzao (USA) 1980	Lady Rebecca (GB); 1971	Pocahontas	Roman
Sire Alzao (USA) 1980	Lady Rebecca (GB); 1971	Pocahontas	How
Dam Merriment (USA) 1975	Go Marching (USA); 1965	Princequillo	Prince Rose
Dam Merriment (USA) 1975	Go Marching (USA); 1965	Princequillo	Cosquilla
Dam Merriment (USA) 1975	Go Marching (USA); 1965	Leallah	Nasrullah
Dam Merriment (USA) 1975	Go Marching (USA); 1965	Leallah	Lea Lark
Dam Merriment (USA) 1975	Tiddlywinks (USA); 1963	Court Martial	Fair Trial
Dam Merriment (USA) 1975	Tiddlywinks (USA); 1963	Court Martial	Instantaneous
Dam Merriment (USA) 1975	Tiddlywinks (USA); 1963	Banri an Oir	Royal Charger
Dam Merriment (USA) 1975	Tiddlywinks (USA); 1963	Banri an Oir	Golden Penny (Family: 1-p)
