= Fearless Lad =

British-bred Thoroughbred racehorse

- Sire: Import
- Grandsire: Porto Bello
- Dam: No Fear
- Damsire: Quayside
- Sex: Stallion
- Foaled: 10 March 1979
- Country: United Kingdom
- Colour: Chestnut
- Breeder: G Soulsby
- Owner: G Soulsby
- Trainer: Dick Peacock
- Record: 17: 6-3-1

Major wins
- Doncaster Stakes (1981); King's Stand Stakes (1982); Temple Stakes (1983)

Awards
- Timeform rating 112 (1981), 126 (1982, 1983)

Fearless Lad (10 March 1979 – June 2006) was a British Thoroughbred racehorse and sire. Trained throughout his racing career in Yorkshire, he showed considerable promise as a juvenile in 1981, winning two of his four races including the Doncaster Stakes. In the following year he emerged as a top-class sprinter, recording his biggest win in the Group One King's Stand Stakes and finishing second in the Prix de l'Abbaye. He was almost as good as a four-year-old when he won the Temple Stakes. He was retired from racing at the end of the year and stood as a breeding stallion in Britain and South Africa but had no success as a sire of winners.

== Background ==
Fearless Lad was a "big, strong" chestnut horse with a broad white blaze and two long white socks on his near-side legs bred in England by his owner G Soulsby. He was trained throughout his racing career by Dick Peacock at Middleham in North Yorkshire. He was one of the best horses sired by Import, a sprinter who won the Stewards' Cup in 1975 and the Wokingham Stakes in 1976. His other offspring included the steeplechaser Young Hustler who won the RSA Chase and finished third in the Cheltenham Gold Cup. Fearless Lad's dam No Fear showed little ability in three seasons of racing, winning one minor race from fifteen starts. She was distantly descended from the influential French broodmare Saint Astra, whose other descendants have included Makybe Diva, Canford Cliffs and Soviet Star.

== Racing career ==
=== 1981: two-year-old season ===
After finishing unplaced on his racecourse debut Fearless Lad won the Highflyer Stakes over five furlongs at Thirsk Racecourse in September, beating Lavender Dance by two lengths. After finishing second on his next start he carried top weight in the Doncaster Stakes over five furlongs at Doncaster Racecourse in October and won by half a length from Special Pleasure.

=== 1982: three-year-old season ===
Fearless Lad showed moderate form in the early part of 1982, finishing unplaced behind Jester in the Duke of York Stakes in May and fourth to Crofthall at Thirsk Racecourse two weeks later. He then won a minor race over five furlongs at Beverley Racecourse in early June, accelerating clear of his rivals in the closing stages to win by five lengths from Special Pleasure. On 18 June Fearless Lad was moved up to Group One class for the King's Stand Stakes over five furlongs at Royal Ascot in which he was ridden by Eddie Hide. He started at odds of 10/1 in a fourteen-runner field which included Jester (the 9/4 favourite), Crofthall, Cajun, Lightning Label (winner of the Palace House Stakes) and Peterhof (Flying Childers Stakes) and Lucky Hunter (runner-up in the Middle Park Stakes). After tracking the leader Tina's Pet in the early stages Fearless Lad took the lead inside the final furlong and accelerated away from his rivals to win by two lengths and one length from the fillies Chellaston Park and Blue Singh.

On his next appearance at Goodwood Racecourse he sweated up badly before the King George Stakes and ran poorly, finishing unplaced behind Tina's Pet. He failed to recover his form in his two remaining British races that season, finishing sixth behind Sharpo in the William Hill Sprint Championship at York in August and third behind Indian King and Great Eastern in the Haydock Sprint Cup in September. For his final appearance of the year, the colt was sent to France for the Prix de l'Abbaye over 1000 metres at Longchamp Racecourse on 3 October. Starting at odds of 12/1 he raced in fourth place before battling on in the closing stages to finish second to Sharpo, beaten a length behind the five-year-old winner at level weights.

=== 1983: four-year-old season ===
Fearless Lad began his third campaign in the Field Marshal Stakes over five furlongs at Haydock Park in April and won easily from Chellaston Park despite looking less than fully fit. In the Palace House Stakes at Newmarket Racecourse in early May he ran "splendidly" to finish second to the three-year-old On Stage, conceding twelve pounds more than weight-for-age to his younger opponent. Four weeks later Fearless Lad 5/4 favourite for the Temple Stakes at Sandown Park in which he was ridden by Lester Piggott. Chellaston Park was again in opposition but the best of his opponents appeared to be Brondesbury (Norfolk Stakes), Vorvados (Duke of York Stakes) and Sweet Monday (Mill Reef Stakes, Abernant Stakes). After looking outpaced in the early stages as Brondesbury set a very fast pace, but began to make rapid progress along the inside rail in the last quarter mile. He gained the advantage in the closing stages and won by a neck from Boy Trumpeter.

At Royal Ascot Fearless Lad attempted to repeat his 1982 success in the King's Stand Stakes and started second favourite behind On Stage. With Hide back in the saddle he finished fifth behind the front-running Sayf El Arab after being slightly hampered in the closing stages. He was then moved up to six furlongs for the July Cup at Newmarket but after sweating up badly before the race he ran disappointingly and finished unplaced behind Habibti. The horse then suffered a series of minor training problems and did not race again.

== Assessment ==
In 1981 the independent Timeform organisation gave Fearless Lad a rating of 112, 20 pounds inferior to their best two-year-old Wind and Wuthering. In the official International Classification he was given a rating of 75, thirteen pounds behind the top-rated European two-year-old Green Forest. In the following year he was rated 126 by Timeform, four pounds behind their best sprinter Sharpo and described him in their annual Racehorses of 1982 as "the best three-year-old sprinter of the season". He was again rated 126 by Timeform in 1983, placing him ten pounds behind the champion sprinter Habibti. In the International Classification he was rated the best older male in Britain over sprint distances.

== Stud record ==
As a breeding stallion Fearless Lad had no success in Europe and was later exported to South Africa where he made little impact. He reportedly died in June 2006 at the age of 27.

== Pedigree ==
Pedigree of Fearless Lad (GB), chestnut stallion, 1979
| Sire Import (GB) 1971 | Porto Bello (GB); 1965 | Floribunda | Princely Gift |
| Sire Import (GB) 1971 | Porto Bello (GB); 1965 | Floribunda | Astrentia |
| Sire Import (GB) 1971 | Porto Bello (GB); 1965 | Street Song | Le Lavandou |
| Sire Import (GB) 1971 | Porto Bello (GB); 1965 | Street Song | Theme Song |
| Sire Import (GB) 1971 | Immortelle (GB); 1960 | Never Say Die | Nasrullah |
| Sire Import (GB) 1971 | Immortelle (GB); 1960 | Never Say Die | Singing Grass |
| Sire Import (GB) 1971 | Immortelle (GB); 1960 | Thunder | Hyperion |
| Sire Import (GB) 1971 | Immortelle (GB); 1960 | Thunder | Chenille |
| Dam No Fear (GB) 1973 | Quayside (GB); 1967 | London Gazette | Panaslipper |
| Dam No Fear (GB) 1973 | Quayside (GB); 1967 | London Gazette | Court Circular |
| Dam No Fear (GB) 1973 | Quayside (GB); 1967 | Wong | Maharaj Kumar |
| Dam No Fear (GB) 1973 | Quayside (GB); 1967 | Wong | Blue Lake |
| Dam No Fear (GB) 1973 | My Plucky Lady (GB); 1963 | Cash and Courage | Rockefella |
| Dam No Fear (GB) 1973 | My Plucky Lady (GB); 1963 | Cash and Courage | Daring Miss |
| Dam No Fear (GB) 1973 | My Plucky Lady (GB); 1963 | Blue Robe | Blue Peter |
| Dam No Fear (GB) 1973 | My Plucky Lady (GB); 1963 | Blue Robe | Mary Phyllis (Family: 9-f) |
