= Doncaster Stakes =

Flat horse race in Britain

Doncaster Stakes
2026
Bengal Tiger	Hi Corbett Court	Crystal Queen

Previous years
2025
Lam Yai	Figjam	Spanish Waltz
2024
La Bellota	Diego Ventura	Bounty
2023
Ballymount Boy	Alaskan Gold	Moswaat
2022
Legend Of Xanadu	Aesop's Fables	Wodao
2021
Flaming Rib	Deodar	Mohi

2020-2011
2020
Lipizzaner	Just Frank	Zamaani
2018
San Donato	Barbill	Breath Of Air
2017
Speak In Colours	Mutaaqeb	Staxton
2016
Rosie Briar	Tomily	Nuclear Power
2015
Dhahmaan	Above N Beyond	Unilit
2014
Code Red	Portamento	Rosie's Premiere
2013
Night Of Thunder	Aeolus	Stubbs
2012
Invincible Warrior	Emell	Taayel
2011
Gusto	Chunky Diamond	Miss Lahar

2010-2001
2010
Earl Of Leitrim	Night Carnation	Galtymore Lad
2009
Layla's Hero	Singeur	Citrus Star
2008
Imperial Guest	Enderby Spirit	Absent Pleasure
2007
Floristry	Fateh Field	Nacho Libre
2006
Hinton Admiral	Resplendent Alpha	Lady Lily
2005
Manston	Jeremy	The Wild Swan
2004
Andronikos	Harvest Warrior	Joseph Henry
2003
Nero's Return	Mac Love	Moonlight Man
2002
Miguel Cervantes	Ikan	Michelle Ma Belle
2001
Falcon Hill	Donegal Shore	Pic Up Sticks

2000-1991
2000
Shaard	Down To The Woods	Piccolo Player
1999
Halland Park Girl	Seven No Trumps	Amethyst
1998
Two Clubs	Perugino Bay	Miss Universe
1997
Ikhteyaar	Special Treat	Deterrent
1996
Elegant Warning	Open Credit	Omaha City
1995
Thrilling Day	Resounder	Greek Icon
1994
Painted Madam	Bahith	Leap For Joy
1993
Ultimo Imperatore	Multi National	Great Deeds
1992
Ansellman	Fyfield Flyer	Surprise Offer
1991
Tamim	Echo-Logical	Artistic Reef

1990-1988
1990
Snowy Owl	Futuh	Dale Hill Daisy
1988
Eloquent Minister	Lugana Beach	Akid

The Doncaster Stakes is a Listed flat horse race in Great Britain open to horses aged two years only. It is run at Doncaster over a distance of 6 furlongs and 2 yards (1,209 metres), and it is scheduled to take place each year in October. Prior to 1993 it was run over 5 furlongs. A notable earlier winner in 1979 was Moorestyle, ridden by Lester Piggott, who went on to be Horse of the Year in 1980.

== Winners ==
Year	Winner	Jockey	Trainer	Time
1976	La Ville De Rire	Joe Mercer	Bill Watts	1:05.26
1977	Hackbridge (Note: Fast Colour finished first, but was disqualified for interference at the furlong marker.)	Pat Eddery	Tommy Gosling	1:02.88
1978	Touch Boy	Peter Madden	Ray Peacock	1:00.73
1979	Moorestyle	Lester Piggott	Robert Armstrong	1:01.45
1980	Shark Song	Lester Piggott	Jeremy Hindley	1:02.90
1981	Fearless Lad	John Lowe	Ray Peacock	1:02.40
1982	Boy Trumpeter	Geoff Baxter	Bruce Hobbs	1:03.42
1983	Meis El-Reem	Steve Cauthen	M Albina	1:00.73
1984	Provideo	Tony Ives	Bill O'Gorman	1:03.91
1985	Wanton	Willie Carson	William Hastings-Bass	1:00.79
1986	La Petite Noblesse	John Reid	Derek Haydn Jones	1:01.04
1987	Infanta Real	Walter Swinburn	Michael Stoute	1:01.31
1988	Eloquent Minister	Stephen Craine	Tommy Stack	1:00.83
1989	Course closed due to subsidence
1990	Snowy Owl	Walter Swinburn	Michael Stoute	1:02.23
1991	Tamim	Richard Hills	Harry Thomson Jones	0:59.70
1992	Ansellman	Cash Asmussen	Mick Haynes	1:01.18
1993	Ultimo Imperatore	Lester Piggott	John Dunlop	1:14.04
1994	Painted Madam	Brent Thomson	Barry Hills	1:16.58
1995	Thrilling Day	David Harrison	Neil Graham	1:21.81
1996	Elegant Warning	Richard Hills	Barry Hills	1:13.57
1997	Ikhteyaar	Richard Hills	Robert Armstrong	1:13.85
1998	Two Clubs	Martin Dwyer	Julie Cecil	1:17.80
1999	Halland Park Girl	Dane O'Neill	Richard Hannon Sr.	1:17.39
2000	Shaard	Willie Supple	Barry Hills	1:17.21
2001	Falcon Hill	Kevin Darley	Mark Johnston	1:18.30
2002	Miguel Cervantes	Kevin Darley	Aidan O'Brien	1:20.10
2003	Nero's Return	Keith Dalgleish	Mark Johnston	1:12.32
2004	Andronikos	Kieren Fallon	Paul Cole	1:15.82
2005	Manston	Kevin Darley	Brian Meehan	1:16.98
2006 (Note: The 2006 running took place at Lingfield Park on an artificial surface)	Hinton Admiral	Jean-Pierre Guillambert	Mark Johnston	1:11.14
2007	Floristry	Jamie Spencer	Michael Stoute	1:12.41
2008	Imperial Guest	Tony Culhane	George Margarson	1:13.60
2009	Layla's Hero	Eddie Ahern	David Nicholls	1:14.21
2010	Earl Of Leitrim	Shane Kelly	Brian Meehan	1:11.79
2011	Gusto	Dane O'Neill	Richard Hannon Sr.	1:11.21
2012	Invincible Warrior	Kieren Fallon	Brian Meehan	1:14.78
2013	Night Of Thunder	Richard Hughes	Richard Hannon Sr.	1:16.91
2014	Code Red	Martin Dwyer	William Muir	1:17.17
2015	Dhahmaan	Frankie Dettori	Marco Botti	1:16.06
2016	Rosie Briar	Rob Hornby	Andrew Balding	1:11.53
2017	Speak In Colours	Andrea Atzeni	Marco Botti	1:14.09
2018	San Donato	Andrea Atzeni	Roger Varian	1:11.69
2019	Abandoned due to waterlogging
2020	Lipizzaner	Ryan Moore	Aidan O'Brien	1:15.45
2021	Flaming Rib	Pierre-Louis Jamin	Tom Dascombe	1:15.60
2022	Legend Of Xanadu	Connor Beasley	Mick Channon	1:16.89
2023	Ballymount Boy	James Doyle	Adrian Keatley	1:16.83
2024	La Bellota	Oisin Murphy	John Ryan	1:15.46
2025	Lam Yai	Shane Gray	Karl Burke	1:16.84
2026	Bengal Tiger	Ryan Moore	Aidan O'Brien	1:15.68

== See also ==
- Horse racing in Great Britain
- List of British flat horse races
