= King Charles III Stakes (Great Britain) =

Flat horse race in Britain

- Class: Group 1
- Location: Ascot Racecourse; Ascot, England
- Inaugurated: 1860
- Race type: Flat / Thoroughbred
- Website: Ascot

Race information
- Distance: 5f (1,006 metres)
- Surface: Turf
- Track: Straight
- Qualification: Three-years-old and up
- Weight: 9 st 1 lb (3yo); 9 st 7 lb (4yo+); Allowances; 3 lb for fillies and mares
- Purse: £725,750 (2025); 1st: £411,573
- Bonuses: see Global Sprint Challenge

King's Stand Stakes
2026
Mission Central	Rayevka	Overpass

Previous years
2025
American Affair	Frost At Dawn	Regional
2024
Asfoora	Regional	Big Evs
2023
Bradsell	Highfield Princess	Annaf
2022
Nature Strip	Twilight Calls	Acklam Express
2021
Oxted	Arecibo	Extravagant Kid

2020-2011
2020
Battaash	Equilateral	Liberty Beach
2019
Blue Point	Battaash	Soldier's Call
2018
Blue Point	Battaash	Mabs Cross
2017
Lady Aurelia	Profitable	Marsha
2016
Profitable	Cotai Glory	Goken
2015
Goldream	Medicean Man	Muthmir
2014
Sole Power	Stepper Point	Hot Streak
2013
Sole Power	Shea Shea	Pearl Secret
2012
Little Bridge	Bated Breath	Sole Power
2011
Prohibit	Star Witness	Sweet Sanette

2010–2001
2010
Equiano	Markab	Borderlescott
2009
Scenic Blast	Fleeting Spirit	Anglezarke
2008
Equiano	Takeover Target	Fleeting Spirit
2007
Miss Andretti	Dandy Man	Magnus
2006
Takeover Target	Benbaun	Pivotal Point
2005
Chineur	Boogie Street	Moss Vale
2004
The Tatling	Cape Of Good Hope	Frizzante
2003
Choisir	Acclamation	Oasis Dream
2002
Dominica	Continent	Kyllachy
2001
Cassandra Go	Misty Eyed	Funny Valentine

2000–1991
2000
Nuclear Debate	Agnes World	Bertolini
1999
Mitcham	Flanders	Sainte Marine
1998
Bolshoi	Lochangel	Lord Kintyre
1997
Don't Worry Me	Titus Livius	Hever Golf Rose
1996
Pivotal	Mind Games	Almaty
1995
Piccolo	Struggler	Mind Games
1994
Lochsong	Blyton Lad	West Man
1993
Elbio	Wolfhound	Paris House
1992
Sheikh Albadou	Mr Brooks	Elbio
1991
Elbio	Irish Shoal	Archway

1990–1988
1990
Dayjur	Ron's Victory	Lugana Beach
1989
Indian Ridge	Tigani	Gallic League
1988
Chilibang	Governor General	Ever Sharp

The King Charles III Stakes (formerly the King's Stand Stakes) is a Group 1 flat horse race in Great Britain open to horses aged three years or older. It is run at Ascot over a distance of 5 furlongs (1,006 metres), and it is scheduled to take place each year in June.

== History ==
The event was created as a result of bad weather at Royal Ascot in 1860. Heavy rain made it impossible to run the Royal Stand Plate over its usual distance of 2 miles, so it was shortened to 5 furlongs on the only raceable part of the course. The amended version was called the Queen's Stand Plate, and it subsequently became the most important sprint at the Royal meeting. For a period it was open to horses aged two or older. It was renamed the King's Stand Stakes following the death of Queen Victoria and the accession of King Edward VII in 1901.

The present system of race grading was introduced in 1971, and the King's Stand Stakes was given Group 1 status in 1973. It was downgraded to Group 2 level in 1988.

The King's Stand Stakes became part of a new international race series, the Global Sprint Challenge, in 2005. It consequently featured a number of high-quality contenders from overseas, and it regained Group 1 status in 2008. It is now the fourth leg of the series, preceded by the KrisFlyer International Sprint and followed by the Golden Jubilee Stakes.

It was renamed King Charles III Stakes in 2023 to mark the King‘s 75th birthday. The race is currently held on the opening day of the Royal Ascot meeting.

== Records ==
Most successful horse (2 wins):

- Woolsthorpe – 1895, 1897
- Kilcock – 1898, 1899
- Sundridge – 1903, 1904
- Foresight – 1908, 1909
- Hornet's Beauty – 1911, 1913
- Diadem – 1919, 1920
- Golden Boss – 1923, 1924
- Gold Bridge – 1933, 1934
- Elbio – 1991, 1993
- Equiano – 2008, 2010
- Sole Power – 2013, 2014
- Blue Point – 2018, 2019

Leading jockey (7 wins):

- Lester Piggott – Right Boy (1957), Majority Rule (1963), Swing Easy (1971), Abergwaun (1973), Godswalk (1977), Solinus (1978), Never So Bold (1985)

Leading trainer (5 wins):

- Vincent O'Brien – Cassarate (1962), Abergwaun (1973), Godswalk (1977), Solinus (1978), Bluebird (1987)

Leading owner (4 wins):

- Jack Joel – Sundridge (1903, 1904), Nice Prospect (1927), Tag End (1929)

== Winners since 1900 ==
Year	Winner	Age	Jockey	Trainer	Owner	Time
1900	Eager	6	Mornington Cannon	Peter Gilpin	Mr L Neumann	
1901	Elizabeth M	3	Lester Reiff	John Huggins	Mr W C Whitney	
1902	Zanoni	7	Herbert Jones	Eugene Leigh	Mr H J King	1:15.60
1903	Sundridge	5	Mornington Cannon	Charles Morton	Jack Joel	
1904	Sundridge	6	Mornington Cannon	Charles Morton	Jack Joel	
1905	Delaunay	4	Otto Madden	Peter Gilpin	Peter Gilpin	
1906	Thrush	4	Herbert Randall	Edward Robson	Captain J Orr-Ewing	
1907	Camp Fire II	7	Danny Maher	Reg Day	Mr A Bailey	
1908	Foresight	5	Billy Higgs	Withington	Lord Fitzwilliam	1:03.80
1909	Foresight	6	Billy Higgs	Costello	Lord Fitzwilliam	
1910	Spanish Prince	3	Herbert Randall	Carter	Mr Nickall	
1911	Hornet's Beauty	3	Skeets Martin	Philip Peebles	Sir W Cooke	
1912	Great Surprise	4	Danny Maher	William Yapp	Mr H Rhodes	
1913	Hornet's Beauty	5	Skeets Martin	Felix Leach	Sir W Cooke	
1914	Adular	4	Nathan Spear	Jim Butters	Baron G Springer	
1915-18	No race					
1919	Diadem	5	Steve Donoghue	George Lambton	Baron d'Abernon	
1920	Diadem	6	Steve Donoghue	George Lambton	Baron d'Abernon	
1921	Tetratema	4	Bernard Carslake	Atty Persse	Dermot McCalmont	1:01.80
1922	King Sol	8	Steve Donoghue	Ossie Bell	Mr J C Galstaun	1:02.80
1923	Golden Boss	3	Charlie Elliott	Sam h Darling	Mr A K Macomber	
1924	Golden Boss	4	Frank O'Neill	Sam Darling	Mr A K Macomber	1:03.80
1925	Diomedes	3	Jack Leach	Harvey Leader	Mr S W Beer	1:02.00
1926	Highborn II	3	Garner	Ossie Bell	M E Esmond	1:07.40
1927	Nice Prospect	4	Bernard Carslake	Charles Peck	Jack Joel	1:02.60
1928	Chichester Cross	4	Charlie Smirke	Howard	Mr C Howard	1:02.80
1929	Tag End	5	Harry Wragg	Charles Peck	Jack Joel	1:03.80
1930	Oak Ridge	8	Harry Beasley	Len Cundell	Mr F H Cundell	1:03.80
1931	Stingo	4	Harry Wragg	P Lowe	Mr D M Gant	1:03.40
1932	Lemnarchus	4	Gordon Richards	Fred Darling	Lord Ellesmere	1:01.00
1933	Gold Bridge	4	Harry Beasley	Major Vanda Beatty	Mr A K Macomber	1:02.20
1934	Gold Bridge	5	Charlie Elliott	Major Vanda Beatty	Lord Beatty	1:04.00
1935	Shalfleet	4	Henri Jelliss	Harvey Leader	Harvey Leader	1:04.00
1936	Sweet Polly	4	Gordon Richards	Len Cundell	Mrs L W S Long	1:03.00
1937	Ticca Gari	3	A Dupuit	Frank Butters	Prince Aly Khan	1:01.60
1938	Foray	4	Rufus Beasley	Cecil Boyd-Rochfort	Mr M Field	1:01.60
1939	Mickey The Greek	5	Harry Wragg	Henry Leach	N Frieze	1:04.00
1940-45	No race					
1946	Vilmorin	3	Cliff Richards	Joseph Lawson	J Read	1:02.80
1947	Greek Justice	3	Gordon Richards	Fred Darling	J A Dewar	1:02.20
1948	Squander Bug	5	Bill Rickaby	M Collins	Mrs E P Moss	1:04.60
1949	Abernant	3	Gordon Richards	Noel Murless	Reginald Macdonald-Buchanan	1:02.00
1950	Tangle	3	Eph Smith	William Payne Sr.	Lady Baron	1:02.00
1951	Stephen Paul	3	Neville Sellwood	Atty Persse	J Olding	1:03.20
1952	Easter Bride	3	Ted Fordyce	Tom Rimell	W J Rimell	1:03.60
1953	Fairy Flax	4	Scobie Breasley	Joseph Lawson	R S Clark	1:04.80
1954	Golden Lion	3	Brian Swift	Cyril Mitchell	W T Barrett	1:04.40
1955	Pappa Fourway	3	Harry Carr	Bill Dutton	Mrs E Goldson	1:02.87
1956	Palariva	3	Roger Poincelet	Alec Head	Aga Khan III	1:01.80
1957	Right Boy	3	Lester Piggott	Bill Dutton	Geoffrey Gilbert	1:04.26
1958	Drum Beat	5	Scobie Breasley	William O'Gorman	J S Gerber	1:02.38
1959	Chris	3	Joe Sime	Billy Nevett	H F Hartley	1:00.82
1960	Sound Track	3	Scobie Breasley	A S O'Brien	Lady Hemphill	1:01.36
1961	Silver Tor	3	Geoff Lewis	Brud Fetherstonhaugh	Stanhope Joel	1:01.40
1962	Cassarate	3	Neville Sellwood	Vincent O'Brien	Countess Margit Batthyany	1:03.02
1963	Majority Rule	3	Lester Piggott	William O'Gorman	J Muldoon	1:04.26
1964	Abandoned due to waterlogging					
1965	Goldhill	4	Jimmy Etherington	Peter Easterby	R G Johnson	1:04.08
1966	Roughlyn	5	George Cadwaladr	Doug Francis	J D Pickering	1:04.20
1967	Be Friendly	3	Scobie Breasley	Cyril Mitchell	Peter O'Sullevan	1:04.38
1968	D'Urberville	3	Joe Mercer	Jeremy Tree	Jock Whitney	1:02.12
1969	Song	3	Joe Mercer	Derrick Candy	Bryan P Jenks	1:03.84
1970	Amber Rama	3	Yves Saint-Martin	François Mathet	Arpad Plesch	0:59.30
1971	Swing Easy	3	Lester Piggott	Jeremy Tree	Jock Whitney	1:09.20
1972	Sweet Revenge	5	Geoff Lewis	Atty Corbett	Mrs B Attenborough	1:01.90
1973	Abergwaun	5	Lester Piggott	Vincent O'Brien	Charles St George	1:02.70
1974	Bay Express	3	Brian Taylor	Peter Nelson	P Miller	0:59.91
1975	Flirting Around	4	Yves Saint-Martin	Robert Carver	A Hausmann	1:00.39
1976	Lochnager	4	Edward Hide	Mick Easterby	Charles Spence	1:02.30
1977	Godswalk	3	Lester Piggott	Vincent O'Brien	Robert Sangster	1:02.20
1978	Solinus	3	Lester Piggott	Vincent O'Brien	Danny Schwartz	1:02.61
1979	Double Form	4	John Reid	Fulke Johnson Houghton	Baroness H. Thyssen	1:01.03
1980	African Song	3	Pat Eddery	Paul Kelleway	Geoffrey Kaye	1:02.30
1981	Marwell	3	Walter Swinburn	Michael Stoute	Sir Edmund Loder	1:00.40
1982	Fearless Lad	3	Edward Hide	Dick Peacock	G. Soulsby	1:01.40
1983	Sayf El Arab	3	Taffy Thomas	Bill O'Gorman	Moufid F. Dabaghi	1:00.10
1984	Habibti	4	Willie Carson	John Dunlop	Mohamed Mutawa	1:01.70
1985	Never So Bold	5	Lester Piggott	Robert Armstrong	Edward Kessly	1:01.70
1986	Last Tycoon	3	Cash Asmussen	Robert Collet	Richard C. Strauss	0:59.28
1987	Bluebird	3	Cash Asmussen	Vincent O'Brien	Robert Sangster	1:05.25
1988	Chilibang	4	Willie Carson	John Dunlop	Janice Heinz	1:00.61
1989	Indian Ridge	4	Steve Cauthen	David Elsworth	Anne Coughlan	1:01.36
1990	Dayjur	3	Willie Carson	Dick Hern	Hamdan Al Maktoum	1:01.96
1991	Elbio	4	Steve Cauthen	Peter Makin	Brian Brackpool	1:01.40
1992	Sheikh Albadou	4	Walter Swinburn	Alex Scott	Hilal Salem	1:00.50
1993	Elbio	6	Walter Swinburn	Peter Makin	Brian Brackpool	1:03.08
1994	Lochsong	6	Frankie Dettori	Ian Balding	Jeff Smith	1:00.73
1995	Piccolo	4	Richard Hughes	Mick Channon	John White & Partners	0:59.67
1996	Pivotal	3	George Duffield	Sir Mark Prescott	Cheveley Park Stud	0:59.49
1997	Don't Worry Me	5	Olivier Peslier	Guy Henrot	Jean-François Gribomont	1:01.95
1998	Bolshoi	6	Carl Lowther	Jack Berry	David & Trish Brown	1:01.16
1999	Mitcham	3	Richard Quinn	Terry Mills	Terry Mills	1:00.58
2000	Nuclear Debate	5	Gérald Mossé	John Hammond	Bob Chester	1:01.13
2001	Cassandra Go	5	Michael Roberts	Geoff Wragg	Trevor Stewart	1:00.49
2002	Dominica	3	Martin Dwyer	Marcus Tregoning	Bobby & Helen Kennard	1:00.89
2003	Choisir	4	Johnny Murtagh	Paul Perry	Terry Wallace & Partners	0:59.68
2004	The Tatling	7	Darryll Holland	Milton Bradley	Dab Hand Racing	1:00.16
2005 (Note: The 2005 running took place at York)	Chineur	4	Christophe Lemaire	Mikel Delzangles	Marquesa de Moratalla	0:57.55
2006	Takeover Target	7	Jay Ford	Joe Janiak	Joe & Ben Janiak	0:59.79
2007	Miss Andretti	6	Craig Newitt	Lee Freedman	Buckley / Mueller / Guenzi	0:57.44
2008	Equiano	3	Olivier Peslier	Mauricio Delcher Sánchez	James Acheson	0:59.35
2009	Scenic Blast	5	Steven Arnold	Daniel Morton	Elio Galante & Partners	0:59.54
2010	Equiano	5	Michael Hills	Barry Hills	James Acheson	0:59.00
2011	Prohibit	6	Jim Crowley	Robert Cowell	Dasmal / Rix / Barr et al.	0:59.50
2012	Little Bridge	6	Zac Purton	Danny Shum	Ko Kam Piu	0:59.69
2013	Sole Power	6	Johnny Murtagh	Edward Lynam	Mrs S. Power	0:58.88
2014	Sole Power	7	Richard Hughes	Edward Lynam	Mrs S. Power	0:58.95
2015	Goldream	6	Martin Harley	Robert Cowell	J Sargeant & J Morley	0:59.11
2016	Profitable	4	Adam Kirby	Clive Cox	Alan Spence	1:02.69
2017	Lady Aurelia	3	John Velazquez	Wesley Ward	Stonestreet Stables, Bolton & Leidel	0:57.45
2018	Blue Point	4	William Buick	Charlie Appleby	Godolphin	0:58.14
2019	Blue Point	5	James Doyle	Charlie Appleby	Godolphin	0:58.53
2020	Battaash	6	Jim Crowley	Charles Hills	Hamdan Al Maktoum	0:58.64
2021	Oxted	5	Cieren Fallon	Roger Teal	Piper, Hirschfeld, Fish & Collins	0:59.03
2022	Nature Strip	7	James McDonald	Chris Waller	R A E Lyons, P D Harrison Et Al	0:58.25
2023	Bradsell	3	Hollie Doyle	Archie Watson	Victorious Racing	1:00.91
2024	Asfoora	5	Oisin Murphy	Henry Dwyer	Noor Elaine Farm Pty Ltd	0:58.60
2025	American Affair	5	Paul Mulrennan	Jim Goldie	Barraston Racing & J S Goldie	0:59.64
2026	Mission Central	3	Ryan Moore	Aidan O'Brien	Tabor / Magnier / Smith / Westerberg / Brant	0:58.72

== Earlier winners ==
- 1860: Queen of the Vale
- 1861: Buckstone
- 1862: Shillelagh
- 1863: Umpire
- 1864: Le Bearnais
- 1865: Saccharometer
- 1866: Hippia
- 1867: Cecrops
- 1868: Xi
- 1869: Gertrude
- 1870: King of the Forest
- 1871: Chopette
- 1872: Bertram
- 1873: Prince Charlie
- 1874: Blenheim
- 1875: Tangible
- 1876: Lowlander
- 1877: Springfield
- 1878: Lollypop
- 1879: Hackthorpe
- 1880: Charibert
- 1881: Ishmael
- 1882: Eastern Empress
- 1883: Prince William
- 1884: Geheimniss
- 1885: Glen Albyn
- 1886: Financier
- 1887: Crowberry
- 1888: Noble Chieftain
- 1889: Formidable
- 1890: Bumptious
- 1891: Lady Caroline
- 1892: Lady Lena
- 1893: Prince Hampton
- 1894: Best Man
- 1895: Woolsthorpe
- 1896: Wishard
- 1897: Woolsthorpe
- 1898: Kilcock
- 1899: Kilcock

== See also ==
- Horse racing in Great Britain
- List of British flat horse races
