= Taffy Thomas (jockey) =

Welsh jockey (c.1945–2022)

Myrddin Lloyd "Taffy" Thomas (c. 1945 – 12 January 2022) was a Welsh jockey who competed in Flat racing.

== Life and career ==
Thomas was born in Caernarfon and began his career as a jockey in 1961. He rode 878 winners before retiring from race riding in 1990 and was particularly noted as a "lightweight" jockey who could ride horses carrying low weights in handicap races. In 1977 he won the Singapore Gold Cup on a horse called Sir Toby. His biggest wins came in the Vernons Sprint Cup in 1978 and the King's Stand Stakes in 1983. He died on 12 January 2022, at the age of 76.

== Major wins ==
- King's Stand Stakes - Sayf El Arab (1983)
- Phoenix Stakes - Swan Princess (1980)
