= Leallah =

American-bred Thoroughbred racehorse

- Sire: Nasrullah
- Grandsire: Nearco
- Dam: Lea Lark
- Damsire: Bull Lea
- Sex: Filly
- Foaled: 1954
- Country: United States
- Colour: Bay
- Breeder: Charlton Clay
- Owner: Charlton Clay
- Trainer: MacKenzie Miller
- Record: 20: 10-2-2
- Earnings: US$152,784

Major wins
- Alcibiades Stakes (1956); Lassie Stakes; Astoria Stakes (1956); Colleen Stakes (1956); Falls City Handicap (1957)

Honours
- DRF & TSD American Champion Two-Year-Old Filly (1956)

Leallah (foaled February 7, 1954 in Kentucky) was an American Thoroughbred racehorse won seven of her eight starts in her first year of racing and was voted the 1956 American Champion Two-Year-Old Filly by Daily Racing Form and Turf & Sports Digest.

== Racing career ==
=== 1956: two-year-old season ===
Leallah was conditioned for racing by future U.S. Racing Hall of Fame inductee MacKenzie Miller. She made her racing debut on June 12, 1956, with a win under Eddie Arcaro at Belmont Park in Elmont, New York. She and Arcaro won another non-stakes race a week later on the same track, then went to Monmouth Park Racetrack in Oceanport, New Jersey, where she equaled the track record for five furlongs with a time of one minute, four seconds flat in winning the Colleen Stakes. After winning the July 7th Lassie Stakes under Bill Hartack at Chicago's Arlington Park, Leallah then came back to Long Island, New York and won the Astoria Stakes at Jamaica Race Course. Reporting on the race, the July 19, 1956 edition of the New York Times wrote that "Leallah's reputation as the "wonder filly" of the season grew at the Jamaica race track yesterday."

On August 14, 1956, on a very muddy track for the Princess Pat Stakes at Washington Park Racetrack in Chicago, Leallah lost for the only time during her two-year-old season when she slogged home fourth to winner Splendored. Leallah was scheduled to run in late August in the Spinaway Stakes at Saratoga Race Course, but after heavy rains resulted in a sloppy track, her trainer made the decision not to run. She then won a non-stakes sprint at Belmont Park in late September before closing out her 1956 campaign with her seventh win in the October 13 Alcibiades Stakes at Keeneland Race Course in Lexington, Kentucky.

Leallah was voted the Champion two-year-old filly by the New York Morning Telegraph / Daily Racing Form and the Turf and Sport Digest. The rival Thoroughbred Racing Association award was won by Romanita.

=== 1957: three-year-old season ===
Although at age three in 1957, Leallah did not match her 1956 performances, during the latter part of the year she returned to top form. On October 10, she set a track record at Keeneland Race Course of 1:09 flat for six furlongs on dirt. and on November 3, she won the important Falls City Handicap at Churchill Downs.

== Broodmare ==
Leallah's impeccable breeding and on-track performances made her a very valuable broodmare. She was retired after her three-year-old campaign to stand at her olwners Marchmont Farm on Winchester Road near Paris, Kentucky. Bred to important stallions such as Round Table, Swaps, Sir Ivor, Vaguely Noble, Herbager, her best foal to race was Go Marching by Princequillo who was sold to Warner L. Jones, Jr. as an unnamed two-year-old colt in a May 1967 Fasig-Tipton sale at Belmont Park for a record $210,000.

== Pedigree ==
Pedigree of Leallah
Sire Nasrullah	Nearco	Pharos	Phalaris
Sire Nasrullah	Nearco	Pharos	Scapa Flow
Sire Nasrullah	Nearco	Nogara	Havresac
Sire Nasrullah	Nearco	Nogara	Catnip
Sire Nasrullah	Mumtaz Begum	Blenheim	Blandford
Sire Nasrullah	Mumtaz Begum	Blenheim	Malva
Sire Nasrullah	Mumtaz Begum	Mumtaz Mahal	The Tetrarch
Sire Nasrullah	Mumtaz Begum	Mumtaz Mahal	Lady Josephine
Dam Lea Lark	Bull Lea	Bull Dog	Teddy
Dam Lea Lark	Bull Lea	Bull Dog	Plucky Liege
Dam Lea Lark	Bull Lea	Rose Leaves	Ballot
Dam Lea Lark	Bull Lea	Rose Leaves	Colonial
Dam Lea Lark	Colosseum	Ariel	Eternal
Dam Lea Lark	Colosseum	Ariel	Adana
Dam Lea Lark	Colosseum	Arena	St. James
Dam Lea Lark	Colosseum	Arena	Oval
