= Wayne Ulugia =

New Zealand rugby league footballer

Personal information
- Born: 8 May 1992 (age 33); Auckland, New Zealand

Playing information
- Height: 180 cm (5 ft 11 in)
- Weight: 93 kg (14 st 9 lb)
- Position: Fullback, Wing, Centre
Club
Years	Team	Pld	T	G	FG	P
2013	North Qld Cowboys	4	6	0	0	24
2014	Hull Kingston Rovers	3	1	0	0	4
	Total	7	7	0	0	28

Wayne Ulugia (born 8 May 1992) is a New Zealand former professional rugby league footballer. He previously played for the North Queensland Cowboys in the National Rugby League and Hull Kingston Rovers in the Super League. He primarily plays fullback, wing and centre.

== Background ==
Born in Auckland, New Zealand, Ulugia played his junior football for the Papakura Sea Eagles before moving to Townsville, Queensland to play for the Burdekin Roosters.

At the end of 2006, Ulugia was signed by the North Queensland Cowboys. He played for the Cowboys' NYC team from 2009 to 2012.

== Playing career ==
On 31 August 2012, Ulugia re-signed with the North Queensland club on a two-year contract.

In round 24 of the 2013 NRL season, Ulugia made his NRL début for North Queensland against the Newcastle Knights. He scored two tries on debut.

On 30 January 2014, the North Queensland club sacked Ulugia due to breaches of their club code of conduct.

In April 2014, Ulugia signed a two-year contract with Hull Kingston Rovers of the Super League starting effective immediately.

On 30 June 2014, Hull Kingston Rovers sacked Ulugia due to 'repeated breaches of club discipline.' In November 2014, the Townsville Blackhawks announced they signed Ulugia along with nine other players for their 2015 roster. In 2015, Ulugia was playing for Norths in the Townsville and District Rugby League Competition.

== Representative career ==
In 2007, Ulugia played for the Australian Schoolboys U15's team.

In 2009, Ulugia played for the Queensland and Australian Schoolboys teams.

In 2011, Ulugia played for the Junior Kiwis.

In 2013, Ulugia was named in the Samoan 2013 Rugby League World Cup training squad.
