= Scott Moore (rugby league) =

Former England international rugby league footballer

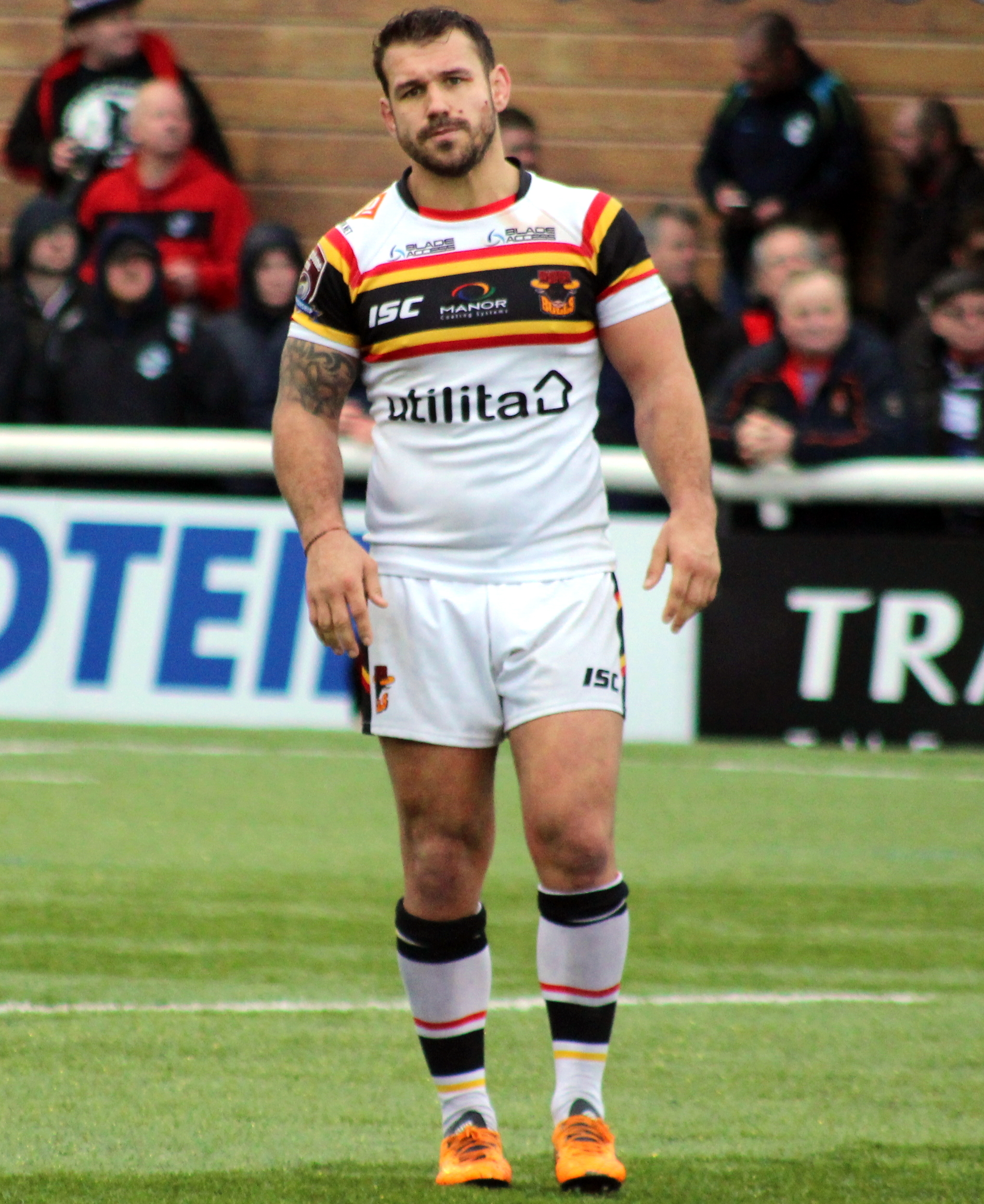

Personal information
- Born: 23 January 1988 (age 38) St Helens, Merseyside, England

Playing information
- Height: 5 ft 10 in (178 cm)
- Weight: 14 st 11 lb (94 kg)
- Position: Hooker, Scrum-half, Stand-off
Club
Years	Team	Pld	T	G	FG	P
2004–11	St Helens	73	9	0	0	36
2008(loan)	→ Castleford Tigers	16	1	0	0	4
2009(loan)	→ Huddersfield Giants	28	9	0	0	36
2012	Widnes Vikings	6	0	0	0	0
2012	Huddersfield Giants	13	1	0	0	4
2013	North Qld Cowboys	6	0	0	0	0
2014	London Broncos	27	2	0	0	8
2015	Castleford Tigers	14	1	0	0	4
2015(loan)	→ Wakefield Trinity Wildcats	3	1	0	0	0
2016	Wakefield Trinity	15	0	0	0	0
2017	Bradford Bulls	25	3	0	0	12
2019	Rochdale Hornets	15	1	0	0	4
2019	Swinton Lions	0	0	0	0	0
	Total	241	28	0	0	108
Representative
Years	Team	Pld	T	G	FG	P
2009	England	2	0	0	0	0

Scott Moore (born 23 January 1988) is an English former rugby league footballer who played as a hooker.

He played in the Super League for St Helens, Huddersfield Giants, London Broncos and Castleford Tigers, and in the National Rugby League (NRL) for the North Queensland Cowboys. Moore finished his playing career with Rochdale Hornets and Swinton Lions in the Championship.

== Playing career ==
=== Club career ===
Moore was the youngest ever Super League player when he made his debut for Saints at the JJB Stadium aged only 16.

Moore spent 2008 on loan at Castleford.

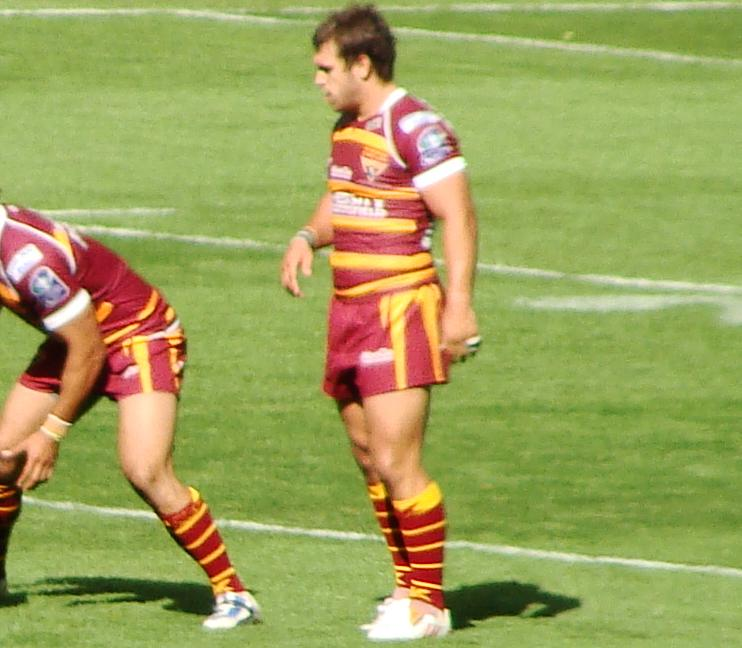
Moore playing for Huddersfield

He spent 2009 on loan at Huddersfield whilst playing hooker. In 2009, Moore was named in the Super League team of the year at Hooker.

Moore returned to St Helens for the start of the 2010 season. Moore played in the 2011 Super League Grand Final defeat against Leeds at Old Trafford.

On 11 October 2011, it was announced that Moore has signed a three-year deal commencing in 2012 with English Super League side Widnes. On Friday 17 February 2012, Widnes Vikings announced they had suspended Moore, Hep Cahill and Simon Finnigan for an unspecified breach of club discipline, so missing the match against Salford City Reds on Sunday 19 February 2012. On 12 April 2012, Moore was sacked by Widnes for a further breach of discipline.

On 17 April 2012, Scott signed for Huddersfield until the end of the season.

In early November 2012 it was announced that Moore had signed a two-year-contract with the North Queensland Cowboys.

In mid January 2014, the London Broncos announced they signed Moore for the 2014 season where he was their starting hooker.

Following the Broncos relegation from Super League he signed a deal with the Castleford from the 2015 season.

Moore was loaned to Wakefield Trinity Wildcats in 2015, with Paul McShane going in the opposite direction.

He later signed a permanent deal for the 2016 season with Wakefield Trinity.

Moore signed for Bradford on a four-game trial. This turned into a year full time deal. However at the end of the season Moore was released.

On 19 June 2019 it was reported that he had signed for Swinton in the RFL Championship in a swap deal with Kyle Shelford

=== International career ===
Moore made his test début for England in 2009, playing two games.

== Personal life ==
On 6 March 2018 Moore was jailed for 23 months at Bolton Crown Court for dangerous driving and assaulting three police officers.
