= Shane Neumann =

Australian rugby league footballer

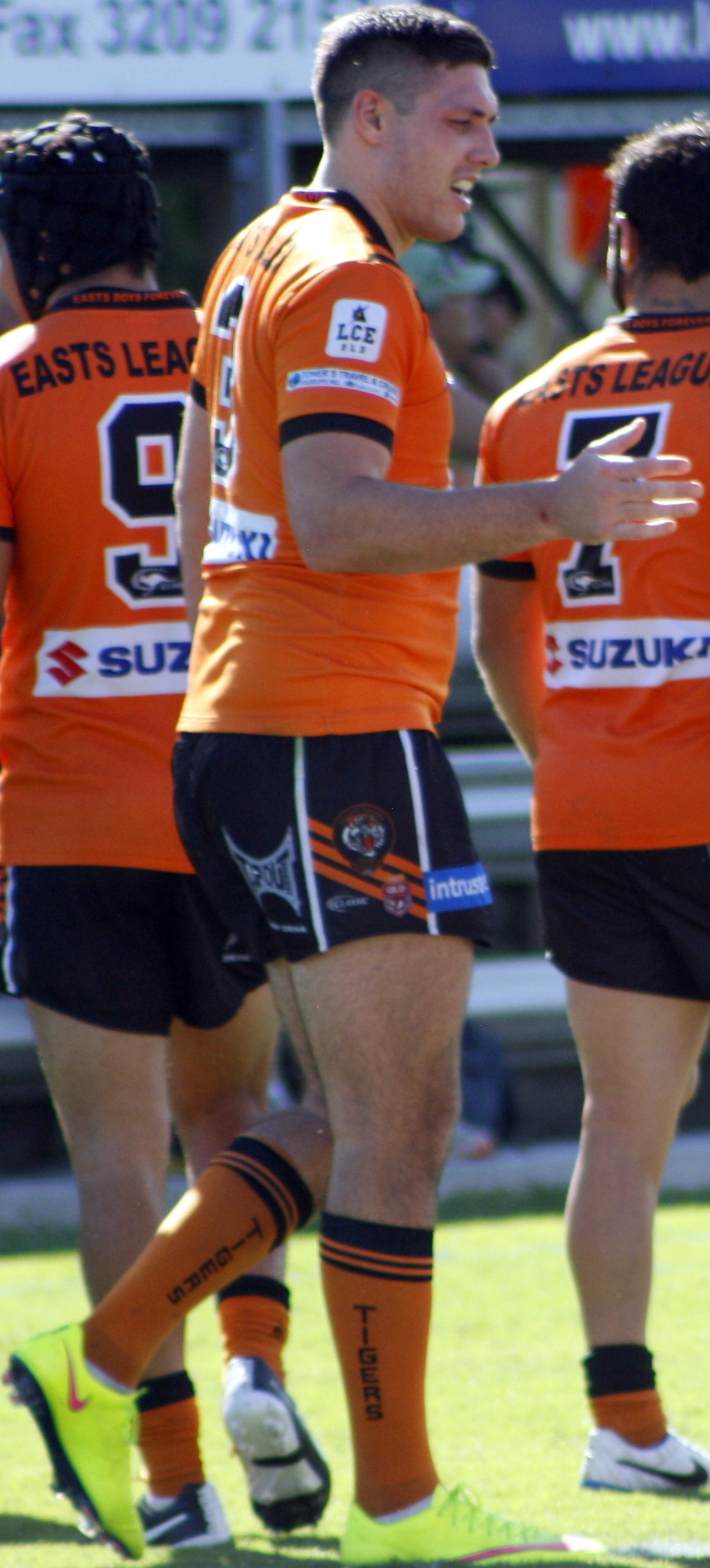

Personal information
- Full name: Shane Neumann
- Born: 11 July 1987 (age 39) Brisbane, Queensland, Australia
- Height: 181 cm (5 ft 11 in)
- Weight: 93 kg (14 st 9 lb)

Playing information
- Position: Centre, Wing
Club
Years	Team	Pld	T	G	FG	P
2007–09	Manly Warringah	7	1	0	0	4
2010	Canterbury-Bankstown	6	2	0	0	8
	Total	13	3	0	0	12
- Source: As of 17 January 2019

Shane Neumann born 11 July 1987 in Brisbane, Queensland, Australia is a former professional rugby league footballer who played for Canterbury-Bankstown and the Manly-Warringah in the National Rugby League. Neumann played in the centres and could also play on the wing.

== Playing career ==
Neumann made his first grade debut for Manly in Round 10 2007 against Brisbane. Neumann played 3 seasons for Manly but did not feature in the 2008 premiership winning team. In 2010, Neumann joined Canterbury and made 6 appearances for the club. In 2011, Neumann signed with Melbourne but made no appearances for the club before being released.
