= Shane Gray =

Philippines international rugby league footballer

Personal information
- Born: 3 September 1990 (age 34); Newcastle, New South Wales, Australia
- Height: 192 cm (6 ft 4 in)
- Weight: 102 kg (16 st 1 lb)

Playing information
- Position: Second-row, Prop, Centre
Club
Years	Team	Pld	T	G	FG	P
2013	Gold Coast Titans	1	0	0	0	0
Representative
Years	Team	Pld	T	G	FG	P
2018–	Philippines		0	0	0	0
- Source: Rugby League Project As of 20 February 2021

Shane Gray (born 3 September 1990) is an Australian professional rugby league footballer. He plays at second-row, prop and centre and previously played for the Gold Coast Titans in the National Rugby League.

== Background ==
Born in Newcastle, New South Wales, Gray played his junior rugby league for the South Newcastle Lions in the Newcastle Rugby League, before being signed by the Newcastle Knights.

== Playing career ==
In 2008, Gray played for the Newcastle Knights' NYC team.

In 2008, Gray signed a two-year contract with the Manly-Warringah Sea Eagles starting in 2009. He played for Manly's NYC team in 2009.

In June 2009, Gray tested positive to clenbuterol, a banned substance. He argued that the substance was found in an asthma medication he was prescribed but chose not to contest the two-year ban. He returned to Newcastle to play for South Newcastle again before joining the Burleigh Bears in the Queensland Cup.

In 2012, Gray was named in the Philippines national rugby league team squad to take on Thailand but pulled out due to family commitments.

After drawing the attention of Gold Coast Titans coach John Cartwright, Gray signed a one-year contract with the Gold Coast club starting in 2013.

In round 12 of the 2013 NRL season, Gray made his NRL debut for the Gold Coast against the North Queensland Cowboys.

At the end of 2013, Gray was released by the Gold Coast.
