= Go Marching =

American-bred Thoroughbred racehorse

- Sire: Princequillo
- Grandsire: Prince Rose
- Dam: Leallah
- Damsire: Nasrullah
- Sex: Stallion
- Foaled: 1965
- Country: United States
- Colour: Bay
- Breeder: Charlton Clay
- Owner: Warner L. Jones Jr. (syndicate)
- Trainer: Horatio Luro
- Record: 20: 10-6-0
- Earnings: US$129,886

Major wins
- Bernard Baruch Handicap (1968); Canadian Turf Handicap (1969); Brandywine Turf Handicap (1969); Appleton Handicap (1969)

Go Marching (1965 – August 10, 1994) was an American Thoroughbred racehorse who was sired by the outstanding Champion sire Princequillo and out of the Champion racemare, Leallah. Bred by Charlton Clay at his Marchmont Farm near Paris, Kentucky, Go Marching was sold to Warner L. Jones Jr. as an unnamed two-year-old colt in a May 1967 Fasig-Tipton sale at Belmont Park for a record price of $210,000.

== Race career ==
Trained by U.S. Racing Hall of Fame inductee, Horatio Luro, at age three Go Marching won the first race of his career on March 7, 1968, at Florida's Gulfstream Park when he ran on turf for the first time. He went on to win the Bernard Baruch Handicap at Saratoga Race Course in Saratoga Springs, New York and then had his best year at age four in 1969 when his wins included the Canadian Turf Handicap and the Appleton Handicap at Gulfstream Park.

== Breeding career ==
Go Marching stood for his owner in Kentucky until age eleven. He was then sent to a breeding farm in France where he remained until age fourteen after which he was purchased by breeders who brought him to stand in Japan where he died on August 10, 1994. Overall, Go Marching met with modest success as a sire.

== Pedigree ==
Pedigree of Go Marching
Sire Princequillo	Prince Rose	Rose Prince	Prince Palatine
Sire Princequillo	Prince Rose	Rose Prince	Eglantine
Sire Princequillo	Prince Rose	Indolence	Gay Crusader
Sire Princequillo	Prince Rose	Indolence	Barrier
Sire Princequillo	Cosquilla	Papyrus	Tracery
Sire Princequillo	Cosquilla	Papyrus	Miss Matty
Sire Princequillo	Cosquilla	Quick Thought	White Eagle
Sire Princequillo	Cosquilla	Quick Thought	Mindful
Dam Leallah	Nasrullah	Nearco	Pharos
Dam Leallah	Nasrullah	Nearco	Nogara
Dam Leallah	Nasrullah	Mumtaz Begum	Blenheim
Dam Leallah	Nasrullah	Mumtaz Begum	Mumtaz Mahal
Dam Leallah	Lea Lark	Bull Lea	Bull Dog
Dam Leallah	Lea Lark	Bull Lea	Rose Leaves
Dam Leallah	Lea Lark	Colosseum	Ariel
Dam Leallah	Lea Lark	Colosseum	Arena
