= 2014 Northern Pride RLFC season =

Coordinates: 16°55′49″S 145°46′2″E

Northern Pride
Club information
- Full name: Northern Pride Rugby League Football Club
- Nickname: The Pride
- Colours: Black, teal and gold
- Founded: 2007
- Website: northernpride.com.au

Current details
- Ground: Barlow Park, Cairns (seating 1,700, standing 15,000)
- CEO: Brock Schaefer (2013–2014)
- Coach: Jason Demetriou (2013–2014)
- Captain: Brett Anderson & Jason Roos (2014–2015)
- Competition: Intrust Super Cup
- 2014: 1st
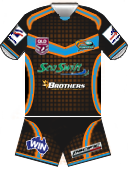
Home colours

Away colours

Records
- Premierships: 2 (2010, 2014)
- Runners-up: 1 (2009)
- Minor premierships: 3 (2013, 2014, 2024)

2014 was the seventh competitive season for the Cairns based Sea Swift Northern Pride Rugby League Football Club. They were one of 13 clubs that played in the nineteenth season of Queensland's top rugby league competition, QRL's Intrust Super Cup, with each team playing 12 home games and 12 away games over 26 weeks between March and August.

This season the competition expanded to the 13 teams with the inclusion of the PNG Hunters. The Hunters first game was a pre-season trial against the Pride in Cairns. The Sunshine Coast Sea Eagles returned to their original name (Sunshine Coast Falcons) and black and gold colour scheme now that their association with the Manly Warringah Sea Eagles had ended, and Souths Logan Magpies became the first QCup team to take advantage of a new rule permitting unselected players from NSW NRL clubs to be play for ISC teams under a secondary affiliation when they linked with the Canberra Raiders.

The Pride gained a new naming rights sponsor, Sea Swift, a north Australian shipping company wholly owned by the Queensland Government Insurance Fund. The Pride made several changes to the game-day experience after surveying their 1,500 members and talking to the local NBL side, the Cairns Taipans. Annual memberships were offered for $110, entry prices were reduced, catering at the ground was cheaper, allocated seating for members was reinstated, there was a big screen showing the game action with replays, a bouncy castle for kids, fireworks, pyrotechnics, Pride Wildcat cheer leaders from Awesome Cheerleading Cairns, and a new mascot, 'Barlow the lion'. Barlow Park was called 'The Jungle'. Average crowds for the year was 2,300, with 4,390 people watching the Round 18 clash against the Hunters, a ground record for a QCup match.

Based on the success of last year's Round 4 match, when the Tweed Heads Seagulls home game was moved to Innisfail with financial assistance from Cassowary Coast Regional Council, this year the Round 6 Norths Devils home game was moved to Innisfail with assistance from Innisfail Brothers Rugby League Football Club. The QCup match preceded a CDRL local game with a Pride connection between the KGC Innisfail Leprechauns captain-coached by Ty Williams and Cairns Brothers captain-coached by Chey Bird. This was the fifth time the Pride had played a QCup match in a regional area (2011 Round 20 in Bamaga, 2012 Round 17 Country Week in Mt Isa, 2013 Round 4 in Innisfail and Round 20 Country Week in Yarrabah.)

The Pride won 20 games out of 24 in the regular season, finishing on top of the ladder as minor-premiers for the second time in their history. They played Easts Tigers four times this year, twice in the regular season, and, twice in the finals series. In the regular season the Pride's Round 7 home match against the Tigers was postponed due to Cyclone Ita. They beat the Tigers 44-20 in the Round 16 away match at Langlands Park, then lost to the Tigers 4-16 three weeks later in the postponed Round 7 match which was played at Davies Park Mareeba. The Pride had several young players in this game, having lost five experienced players and the coach to representative duties. The Pride got a bye in week one of the finals while the Tigers defeated Wynnum Manly. The major semi-final saw the Pride beat the Tigers 8-7 in a tight game. The victory earned the Pride another week off, while the Tigers eliminated Wynnum Manly in the Preliminary Final, setting up a rematch against the Pride in the Grand Final. This was played at Suncorp Stadium in front of a crowd of 7,135, with the Pride winning convincingly 36–4, their second premiership.

The Pride went on to beat the Penrith Panthers in the first NRL State Championship at ANZ Stadium. Javid Bowen was named Man of the Match.

This season the Pride finalised a 12-month governance review led by chief executive Brock Schaefer, chairman Bob Fowler and consultant Andrew Griffiths, which recommended a new skills-driven board with specific portfolios of sponsorship, football, government, community, legal, financial and a chairman. A new board was appointed in May 2014.

== 2014 Season - Sea Swift Northern Pride ==
- Competition: Intrust Super Cup
- Sponsor: Sea Swift

=== Staff ===
==== Coaches/Trainers ====
- Coach: Jason Demetriou
- Assistant coach: Joe O'Callaghan
- Mal Meninga Cup U-18s coach: Chey Bird (JCU Academy), Cameron 'Spilla' Miller
- Cyril Connell Cup U-16s coach: Shane O'Flanagan (JCU Academy) – won their first Grand Final in 2014.
- Strength and conditioning coach: Patrick Ranasinghe
- Physiotherapist: Tim Laycock
- Trainer: Deb Gallop

==== Captains ====
- Co-Captains: Brett Anderson & Jason Roos.

==== Managers ====
- Team manager: Rob White
- Club captain:
- Development Officer: Blake Leary
- Administration Manager: Kerri Neil
- 'Take Pride' Program Manager: Rod Jensen
- Mascot: Barlow the Lion (Peter Spooner)
- Chief executive: Brock Schaefer
- Chairman: Bob Fowler
- Board of Directors: Re/Max Cairns owner Tony Williamson (sponsorship), Moore Developments director John Moore, Families and Responsibilities Commission registrar Rob White (football), Sergeant Stephen Tillett (community), Sea Swift chief executive Fred White (government), Omega lawyers principal Anthony Mirotsos (legal), NQEA financial controller Gail Andrejic (finance).

== 2014 Squad ==
The Pride used 33 players this season. Sixteen players from last year signed with the club again, and five of the Cowboys allocation players from last year were assigned to the Pride again this year. Twelve new players made their debut this season; eight were new signings (Ben Jeffries, Jack Svendsen, Jared Allen, Latu Fifita, Linc Port, Menmuny Murgha, PJ Webb and Tyrone McCarthy), and four were new Cowboys allocation players (Cameron King*, Javid Bowen*, Matthew Wright* and Patrick Kaufusi*). Blake Leary was released by the Cowboys and signed with the Pride.

Brett Anderson (co-captain)
Jason Roos (co-captain)
Alex Starmer.
Blake Leary
Ben Jeffries
Ben Spina.
Brent Oosen
Davin Crampton
Hezron Murgha
Jack Svendsen
Jared Allen
Jordan Biondi-Odo

Justin Castellaro (Italy)
Latu Fifita (Tonga)
Linc Port
Menmuny Murgha
PJ Webb
Ryan Ghietti (Italy)
Sam Obst
Semi Tadulala (Fiji)
Shaun Nona
Sheldon Powe-Hobbs (Scotland)
Tom Hancock
Tyrone McCarthy (Republic of Ireland)

Trial

Josh Mene
Aidan Smith
Keelan White
Jayden Gil
Taha Tutavake
Trey Kemp
Noel Underwood

North Queensland Cowboys allocation

Cameron King*
Ethan Lowe*
Javid Bowen*
Joel Riethmuller*
Kyle Feldt*
Matthew Wright* (Samoa)
Patrick Kafusi* (Tonga)
Ricky Thorby* (New Zealand)
Robert Lui*
Scott Bolton*

Allocated but did not play for the Pride in 2014:
Lachlan Coote
Ray Thompson*

=== 2014 player gains ===
Player	From League	From Club	Notes
Latu Fifita	Knock-On Effect NSW Cup	North Sydney Bears	
Linc Port	Intrust Super Cup	Norths Devils	
Blake Leary	NRL Telstra Premiership	North Queensland Cowboys	
Jack Svendsen	NRL U-20s	North Queensland Cowboys	
Sheldon Powe Hobbs	NRL U-20s	Melbourne Storm	
Tyrone McCarthy	English RFL Super League	Warrington Wolves	
Trent Barnard	CDRL	Ivanhoes Knights	
Pete Tognolini	CDRL	Brothers Cairns	

=== Player losses after 2013 season ===
Player	To League	To Club
Ty Williams (c)	Retired to CDRL	Captain-coach CDRL Innisfail Leprachauns
Hezron Murgha	NRL Telstra Premiership	North Queensland Cowboys
Noel Underwood	NSW Cup	Newcastle Knights
Steve Snitch	English RFL Betfred Championship	Doncaster RLFC
Nick Dorante	Intrust Super Cup	Redcliffe Dolphins
Jordan Tighe	Intrust Super Cup	Ipswich Jets
Ben Laity	Retired	
Aiden Smith	Resigned	

==== Cowboys no longer allocated to the Pride ====
Player	To League	To Club
Scott Moore*	English RFL Super League	London Broncos
Wayne Ulugia*	English RFL Super League	Hull Kingston Rovers
Felise Kaufusi	Intrust Super Cup	Easts Tigers

=== 2014 season launch ===
- Cairns induction day: 16 November 2013.
- Pre-season training: 18 November 2013.
- Pre-Season Boot Camp: Lake Tinaroo, Atherton Tablelands, 21–23 February 2014, and training with the Atherton Roosters at Atherton Stadium.
- 2014 Season Launch: ?

==== 2014 player awards ====
8 October 2014, Brothers World of Entertainment, Manunda

- Sea Swift Northern Pride Player of the Year: Ben Spina
- Sea Swift Players' Player: Blake Leary
- Sea Swift Members' Player of the Year: Sam Obst
- Sea Swift Most improved player: Sheldon Powe-Hobbs
- Sea Swift Best Back: Sam Obst
- Sea Swift Best Forward: Tyrone McCarthy
- John O'Brien Perpetual Club Person of the Year: Pat Bailey (CDRL)

==== 2014 player records ====
- Most Games: Sam Obst (27), Tyrone McCarthy (27)..
- Most Tries: Davin Crampton (17).
- Most Points: Shaun Nona (206).

==== 2014 Queensland Residents team ====
Blake Leary
Davin Crampton
Shaun Nona
Ben Spina
Javid Bowen.

==== Players signed to first-tier teams ====
Player	To League	To Club
Shaun Nona	NRL Telstra Premiership	Melbourne Storm
Blake Leary	NRL Telstra Premiership	Manly Warringah Sea Eagles
Ben Spina	NRL Telstra Premiership	North Queensland Cowboys
Davin Crampton	NRL Telstra Premiership	Gold Coast Titans
Tyrone McCarthy	English RFL Super League	Hull Kingston Rovers
Latu Fifita	English RFL Kingstone Press Championship	Workington Town

==== 2014 Sponsors ====
- Naming rights sponsor: Sea Swift
- Jersey sponsor (back of jersey): Sea Swift, Brothers Leagues Club, Emu Sportswear.
- Sleeve sponsor: Skytrans
- Finals Series sleeve sponsor: Rivers Insurance Brokers
- Shorts sponsor: Brothers Leagues Club, Cairns Regional Council, Fuller Sports, Intrust Super, Cairns Hardware, EMU Sportswear.
- Shirt manufacturer: EMU Sportswear.
- Other sponsors: Castlemaine XXXX; Pacific Toyota; Cairns District Rugby League; Calanna Pharmacy; Tropic Wings; GATA Plastering; All Seasons Cairns Colonial Club; Cairns Plan Printing; Yalumba Winery.
- Media partners: Sea FM; WIN Television; Cairns Post.

=== 2014 Jerseys ===
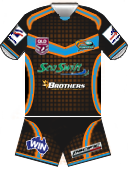
2014 primary Jersey

2014 alternative Jersey

=== Trial Matches ===
Pre-season Trial 1
Saturday
1 February 2014
16:00 AEST (UTC+10)

Northern Pride	24 – 20	NYC NQ Cowboys U-20s
Tries:<r />Jaseon Roos 1 Jared Allen 1 Menmuny Murgha 1 Alex Starmer 1 Goals: Justin Castellaro (4 from 4) 4	Pride Preview; Cowboys Preview; Pride Report; Cowboys Report; Pride photos YouTube	Tries: 1 Schulte; 1 Solari; 1 Munro; 1 Grant; Goals: 2 Jensen (2 from 4)

Stan Williams Park
(Behan St, Manunda, Cairns, QLD)

Sea Swift Northern Pride: 1. Jordan Biondi-Odo – FB 2. Josh Mene – WG 3. Brett Anderson (c) – CE 4. Justin Castellaro – CE 5. Semi Tadulala – WG 6. Jared Allen – FE 7. Ryan Ghietti – HB 8. Alex Starmer – PR 9. Jason Roos (c) – HK 10. Aidan Smith – PR 11. Sheldon Powe-Hobbs – SR 12. Tom Hancock – SR 13. Keelan White – LK
Unlimited Interchange: 14. Jayden Gil, 15. Taha Tutavake, 16. Brent Oosen, 17. Latu Fifita, 18. Trey Kemp, 19. Menmuny Murgha.
* = Cowboys allocation
Unavailable: Davin Crampton and Noel Underwood (both selected to play for the First Nation Goannas at Hunter Stadium on 8 February against Newcastle Knights).
NYC U20s North Queensland Cowboys: 1. Alex Grant, 2. Kurt Perry, 3. Hayden Crowley, 4. Scott Schulte, 5. Jonico Hardwick, 6. Aaron Solari, 7. James Redman, 8. David Munro, 9. Chris Law, 10. Jack Brock, 11. Bill Cullen, 12. Corey Jensen, 13. Kieran Quabba.
Interchange: 14. Sam Pau, 15. Dan Clarke, 16. Michael Barclay, 17. Ben Mathiou, 18. Andrew Niemoeller, 19. Yamba Bowie, 20. Bill Kikau.

Pre-season Trial 2
Sunday
9 February 2014
17:30 AEST (UTC+10)

Northern Pride	18 – 26	PNG Hunters
Tries: Semi Tadulala 1 Justin Castellaro 1 Tyrone McCarthy 1 Blake Leary 1 Goals: Shaun Nona (1 from 4) 1	Cairns Post Preview; Cairns Post Preview; Cairns Post Report; Cairns Post Photos; YouTube 1 YouTube 2	Tries: 1 Israel Eliab 2; 1 Thompson Teteh; 2 Adex Wera Goals: 3 Roger Laka (3 from 5)

Barlow Park
(Severin Street, Parramatta Park, QLD)
Referee: Peter Gough

Sea Swift Northern Pride: 1. Jordan Biondi-Odo – FB 2. Josh Mene – WG 3. Brett Anderson (c) – CE 4. Justin Castellaro – CE 5. Semi Tadulala – WG 6. Shaun Nona – FE 7. Ryan Ghietti – HB 8. Alex Starmer – PR 9. Jason Roos (c) – HK 10. Aidan Smith – PR 11. Blake Leary – SR 12. Tyrone McCarthy – SR 13. Ben Spina – LK
Unlimited Interchange: 14. Keelan White, 15. Tom Hancock, 16. Brent Oosen, 19. Menmuny Murgha, 20. Jack Svendsen, 21. Latu Fifita, 22. Sheldon Powe-Hobbs.
* = Cowboys allocation.
Unavailable: Davin Crampton and Noel Underwood (both selected to play for the 'First Nation Goannas' at Hunter Stadium on 8 February against Newcastle Knights), Sam Obst (minor injury), Jared Allen (minor injury).
SP PNG Hunters: Adex Wera, Albert Patak, Adam Korave, Brandy Peter, David Loko, Edward Goma, Esau Siune, Garry Lo, George Benson, Gonzela Urakusie, Israel Eliab (c), Joe Bruno, Lawrence Tu'u, Noel Joel, Noel Zemming, Roger Laka, Sebastian Pandia, Thompson Teteh, Biuku (Tiger) Emere, Timothy Lomai, Wartovo Puara, William Minoga.
Coach: Michael Marum.

Pre-season Trial 3
Saturday
15 February 2014
17:00 AEST (UTC+10)

Northern Pride	22 – 20	Mackay Cutters
Tries: Justin Castellaro 1 Davin Crampton 1 Ben Spina 1 Blake Leary 1 Goals: Shaun Nona (3 from 4) 3	Cairns Post Preview; Daily Mercury Preview; Cowboys Preview; Pride Report; Cowboys Report; Gladstone Observer Report	Tries: 1 Hayden Crockett; 1 Chris Ulugia; 1 James Uhatafe; 1 Josh Benjamin; Goals: 1 John Asiata; 1 Liam Taylor

Townsville Centrals ASA RLFC Oval
(Anne St, Aitkenvale, Townsville, QLD)
Referee: Liam Kennedy.

Sea Swift Northern Pride: 1. Matthew Wright* – FB 2. Menmuny Murgha – WG 3. Justin Castellaro – CE 4. Davin Crampton – CE 5. Semi Tadulala – WG 6. Shaun Nona – FE 7. Sam Obst – HB 8. Alex Starmer – PR 9. Jason Roos (c) – HK 10. Scott Bolton* – PR 11. Blake Leary – SR 12. Tyrone McCarthy – SR 13. Ben Spina – LK
Unlimited Interchange: 14. Cameron King*, 15. Ethan Lowe*, 16. Ricky Thorby*, 17. Patrick Kaufusi*, 18. Tom Hancock, 19. Jared Allen, 20. Noel Underwood.
* = Cowboys allocation.
Unavailable: Javid Bowen* and Kyle Feldt* selected to play for the North Queensland Cowboys at the NRL Auckland Nines.
Absolute Enterprises Mackay Cutters: Liam Taylor, Chris Ulugia, Josh Benjamin, Michael Koko, Aaron Fairweather, Dan Murphy, Tom Rouse, Sam Hoare, Dave Petersen, Karl Davies, Dean Webster, Chris Gesch, Jason Schirnack, Doug Hewitt, Aleki Falipaini, Ashton Sims, Hayden Crockett, Glenn Hall, John Asiata, Dan Beasley, Mitch Day, James Uhatafe, Justin Tavae, Ryan Kinleyside, Rohan Ahern, Pulou Vaituutuu.

=== Intrust Super Cup matches ===
ROUND 1: Intrust Super Cup 2014

Saturday
1 March 2014
17:30 AEST (UTC+10)

Northern Pride	36 – 0	Sunshine Coast Falcons
Tries: Justin Castellaro 3 Cameron King* 1 Davin Crampton 1 Tyrone McCarthy 1 Ricky Thorby* 1 Goals: Shaun Nona (4 from 7) 4	Half-time:12 – 0 QRL Report; Pride Preview; Logan Reporter; Cairns Post Preview; Cairns Post Preview; Cairn Post Report; Sunshine Coast Daily Review; QRL Video	Tries: Goals:

Barlow Park
(Severin Street, Parramatta Park, QLD)
Attendance: 2,492
Referee: Michael Gordon

Sea Swift Northern Pride: 1. Matthew Wright* – FB 2. Justin Castellaro – WG 3. Brett Anderson (c) – CE 4. Davin Crampton – CE 5. Javid Bowen* – WG 6. Shaun Nona – FE 7. Sam Obst – HB 20. Alex Starmer – PR 9. Jason Roos (c) – HK 10. Ricky Thorby* – PR 11. Ethan Lowe* – SR 12. Tyrone McCarthy – SR 13. Ben Spina – LK
Interchange: 14. Cameron King*, 15. Blake Leary, 21. Latu Fifita, 17. Brent Oosen.
* = Cowboys allocation.
Unavailable: Lachlan Coote* (ACL injury at NRL Auckland Nines), Patrick Kaufusi* (pectoral), Hezron Murgha (knee), Aidan Smith (resigned to work in the mines in WA), Noel Underwood (signed with Newcastle Knights to play NSW Cup). Smith and Underwood were replaced by Brent Oosen and Jack Svendsen.
SC Falcons: 1. Kyle Van Klaveren 2. Samuel Wright 3. Callum Klein 4. Rowan Klein 5. Dale Middleton 6. Brett Doherty 7. David Oakes 8. Mitch Ebdon 9. Jay Lobwein 10. Ryan Hansen (c) 11. Rueben Baillie 12. Jacob Samoa 13. Kristian Wanka.
Interchange: 14. Kai Busiko 15. Brenton Stonier 16. Beau Walker 18. Dalton Harry 17. Travis Long.
Coach: Ivan Henjak
- Note: This was the Pride debut for Tyrone McCarthy and Latu Fifita (Pride Players 099 & 101), and North Queensland Cowboys allocation players Matthew Wright*, Javid Bowen* and Cameron King* (Pride Players 097, 098 & 100).

Position	Round 1 – 2014	P	W	D	L	B	For	Against	Diff	Pts
1	Northern Pride	1	1	1	0	0	0	36	0	2

ROUND 2: Intrust Super Cup 2014

Saturday
8 March 2014
18:00 AEST (UTC+10)

CQ Capras	26 – 38	Northern Pride
Tries: Rhys Williams 2 Marlon Doak 1 Marco Delapena 1 Sam Pierce 1 Goals: Theeran Pearson 3 Penalty Goal:	QRL Report; Cairns Post Preview; Pride report QRL Report	Tries: 2 Shaun Nona; 2 Cameron King*; 1 Davin Crampton; 1 Ben Spina; Goals: 6 Shaun Nona (6 from 6); Penalty Goal: 1 Shaun Nona

Browne Park
(Wandal, Rockhampton, QLD)
Referee: Rob Gallacher

Sea Swift Northern Pride: 1. Jordan Biondi-Odo – FB 2. Justin Castellaro – WG 3. Brett Anderson (c) – CE 4. Davin Crampton – CE 5. Semi Tadulala – WG 6. Shaun Nona – FE 7. Sam Obst – HB 20. Alex Starmer – PR 9. Cameron King* – HK 10. Ricky Thorby* – PR 11. Ethan Lowe* – SR 12. Tyrone McCarthy – SR 13. Ben Spina – LK
Interchange: 14. Jason Roos (c) 15. Blake Leary, 21. Latu Fifita, 17. Brent Oosen.
* = Cowboys allocation.
Unavailable: Aidan Smith (resigned), Noel Underwood (signed with Newcastle Knights NSW Cup side), Lachlan Coote* (ACL injury at NRL Auckland Nines), Matthew Wright* (hand laceration).
CQ Capras: 1. Marlon Doak, 2. Mitch Zornig, 3. Marco Delapena, 4. Smith Samau, 5. Rhys Williams, 6. Mark Johnstone, 7. Theeran Pearson, 8. Arlin Paki, 9. Reece Baker, 10. Sebastien Martins, 11. Andrew Dale, 12. Guy Williams (c), 13. Peter Gallen.
Interchange: 14. Grant Rogers, 15. Brent Williams, 16. Sam Pierce, 17. John Clayton, 18. Liam Pickersgill, 19. Ha'ofanga Rabakewa, 20. Hayden Buckman, 21. Matt Mizzi, 22. Ian Webster.
Coach: Jason Hetherington.

Position	Round 2 – 2014	P	W	D	L	B	For	Against	Diff	Pts
1	Northern Pride	2	2	0	0	0	74	26	48	4

ROUND 3: Intrust Super Cup 2014

Saturday
15 March 2014
17:30 AEST (UTC+10)

Northern Pride	20 – 12	Redcliffe Dolphins
Tries: Justin Castellaro 1 Jack Svendsen 1 Jason Roos 1 Goals: Shaun Nona (3 from 3) 3 Penalty Goal: Shaun Nona 1	QRL Report; QRL Preview; Cairns Post Report; Cairns Post Report; QRL Video; Dolphin TV	Tries: 1 James Ackerman; 1 Aaron Whitchurch Goals: 2 Adrian Davis (2 from 2); Penalty Goal:

Barlow Park
(Severin Street, Parramatta Park, QLD)
Referee: Chris Anderson.

Sea Swift Northern Pride: 1. Matthew Wright* – FB 2. Justin Castellaro – WG 3. Brett Anderson (c) – CE 4. Davin Crampton – CE 5. Javid Bowen* – WG 6. Shaun Nona – FE 7. Sam Obst – HB 20. Alex Starmer – PR 9. Cameron King* – HK 10. Jack Svendsen – PR 11. Blake Leary – SR 12. Ethan Lowe* – SR 13. Ben Spina – LK
Interchange: 14. Jason Roos (c) 15. Tyrone McCarthy, 16. Joel Riethmuller*, 21. Latu Fifita.
Interchange: 14. Jason Roos (co-captain), 15. Tyrone McCarthy, 16. Joel Riethmuller*, 21. Latu Fifita.
* = Cowboys allocation
Unavailable: Semi Tadulala (pectoral injury), Patrick Kaufusi* (pectoral), Hezron Murgha (knee).
Redcliffe Dolphins: 1. Stewart Mills, 2. Monikura Tikinau, 3. Aaron Whitchurch, 4. Marty Hatfield (c), 5. Brett Coutts, 6. Zach Strasser, 7. Adrian Davis, 8. Jon Green (c), 9. Cameron Cullen, 10. James Ackerman, 11. Sarafu Fatiaki, 12. Jake Marketo, 13 Tom Geraghty.
Interchange: 14. Tui Samoa, 15. Joe Bradley, 16. Taylor Brown, 17. David Hala.
Coach: Troy Lindsay

Position	Round 3 – 2014	P	W	D	L	B	For	Against	Diff	Pts
1	Northern Pride	3	3	0	0	0	94	38	+56	6

ROUND 4: Intrust Super Cup 2014

Saturday
22 March 2014
14:30 PNG Pacific Time (UTC+10)

PNG Hunters	18 – 34	Northern Pride
Tries: Garry Lo1; George Benson 1 David Loko 1 Goals: Noel Zemming (3 from 3) 3	QRL Report; QRL Preview; Pride Preview; Radio Australia; PNG Edge Report; Cairns Post Report; QRL Report; QRL Video; KVG Kumul Video	Tries: 1 Justin Castellaro; 2 Tyrone McCarthy; 1 Davin Crampton; 1 Javid Bowen*; 1 Shaun Nona; Goals: 5 Shaun Nona (5 from 6)

Kalabond Oval
(Kokopo, East New Britain Province, PNG)
Referee: Tim Rutherford.

Sea Swift Northern Pride: 1. Matthew Wright* – FB 2. Justin Castellaro – WG 3. Brett Anderson (c) – CE 4. Davin Crampton – CE 5. Javid Bowen* – WG 6. Shaun Nona – FE 7. Sam Obst – HB 20. Alex Starmer – PR 9. Jason Roos (c) – HK 10. Jack Svendsen – PR 11. Blake Leary – SR 12. Ethan Lowe* – SR 13. Ben Spina – LK
Interchange: 14. Ryan Ghietti, 15. Tyrone McCarthy, 21. Joel Riethmuller*, 18. Sheldon Powe-Hobbs.
* = Cowboys allocation
Unavailable: Semi Tadulala (pectoral injury), Cameron King* (knee), Ricky Thorby* (knee), Patrick Kaufusi* (pectoral), Murgha (knee).
SP PNG Hunters: 1. Adex Wera, 2. Garry Lo, 3. Thompson Teteh, 4. Albert Patak, 5. George Benson, 6. Israel Eliab (c), 7. Noel Zemming, 8. Joe Bruno, 9. Wartovo Puara, 10. Gonzela Urakusie, 11. David Loko, 12. Brandy Peter, 13. Sebastian Pandia.
Interchange: 14. Tiger Emere, 15. Willie Minoga, 16. Lawrence Tu'u, 17. Mark Mexico, 18. Edward Goma.
Coach: Michael Marum
- Note: This was the Pride's first overseas QCup game.
  This was Alex Starmer's 100th game for the Pride. He became the third Pride player to reach the 100 game milestone for the club, after Jason Roos (118 matches so far) and Ben Laity (117 matches so far).

Position	Round 4 – 2014	P	W	D	L	B	For	Against	Diff	Pts
1	Northern Pride	4	4	0	0	0	128	56	+72	8

ROUND 5: Intrust Super Cup 2014

29–30 March 2014

Northern Pride	BYE
	Cairns Post Review

Position	Round 5 – 2014	P	W	D	L	B	For	Against	Diff	Pts
1	Northern Pride	4	4	0	0	1	128	56	+72	10

ROUND 6: Intrust Super Cup 2014

Saturday
5 April 2014
17:00 AEST (UTC+10)

Norths Devils	22 – 24	Northern Pride
Tries: James Sharkie 1 Rogan Dean 2 Dylan Galloway 1 Goals: Todd Murphy (3 from 4) 3 Penalty Goals:	Half-time: 16 – 6 QRL Report; Cairns Post Preview; Cairns Post Preview; QRL Report; Cairns Post Report; QRL Video; YouTube	Tries: 2 Brett Anderson; 1 Blake Leary; 1 Ben Spina; Goals: 3 Shaun Nona (3 from 4); Penalty Goals: 1 Shaun Nona (1 from 2)

Billy Slater Oval
(Callendar Park, Innisfail, QLD)
Attendance: 2,500
Referee: Peter Gough

Sea Swift Northern Pride: 20. Kyle Feldt* – FB 2. Justin Castellaro – WG 3. Brett Anderson (c) – CE 4. Davin Crampton – CE 5. Javid Bowen* – WG 6. Shaun Nona – FE 7. Sam Obst – HB 22. Ricky Thorby* – PR 9. Jason Roos (c) – HK 10. Alex Starmer – PR 11. Ethan Lowe* – SR 12. Tyrone McCarthy – SR 13. Ben Spina – LK
Interchange: 14. Ryan Ghietti, 15. Blake Leary, 16. Jack Svendsen, 17. Sheldon Powe-Hobbs.
* = Cowboys allocation.
Unavailable: Semi Tadulala (pectoral injury), Cameron King* (knee), Patrick Kaufusi* (pectoral), Hezron Murgha (knee).
Norths Devils: 1. Shaun Carney, 2. Rogan Dean, 3. Tristan Lumley, 4. Dylan Galloway, 5. Kainga Turner, 6. Todd Murphy, 7. Sam Foster, 8. Jamie Muller, 9. Krys Freeman, 10. Jared Blanke, 11. Chris Faust, 12. Brendon Gibb (c), 13. James Sharkie.
Interchange: 14. Byron Creighton, 15. Patrick McPherson, 16. James Geurtjens, 18. Dean Sheppard, 19. Brad McKee, 20. Zach Koitka.
Coach: Mark Gliddon.
- Note: This Devils home game was relocated to Innisfail with financial assistance from Innisfail Brothers Leagues Club.

Position	Round 6 – 2014	P	W	D	L	B	For	Against	Diff	Pts
1	Northern Pride	5	5	0	0	1	152	78	+74	12

ROUND 7: Intrust Super Cup 2014

Saturday
12 April 2014
17:30 AEST (UTC+10)

Northern Pride	POSTPONED	Easts Tigers
	Cairns Post Preview; Cairns Post Preview; Cairns Post Notice

Barlow Park
(Severin Street, Parramatta Park, QLD)

Sea Swift Northern Pride: POSTPONED - 1. Javid Bowen* – FB 2. Justin Castellaro – WG 3. Brett Anderson (c) – CE 4. Davin Crampton – CE 5. Kyle Feldt* – WG 6. Shaun Nona – FE 7. Sam Obst – HB 8. Jack Svendsen – PR 9. Jason Roos (c) – HK 10. Alex Starmer – PR 11. Ethan Lowe* – SR

12. Tyrone McCarthy – SR 13. Ben Spina – LK

Interchange: 14. Ryan Ghietti, 15. Blake Leary, 16. Ricky Thorby*, 17. Sheldon Powe-Hobbs, 21. Latu Fifita. (One to be omitted).
* = Cowboys allocation.
Unavailable: Semi Tadulala (pectoral injury), Cameron King* (knee), Patrick Kaufusi* (pectoral), Hezron Murgha (knee).
Easts Tigers: POSTPONED - 1. Eddie Tautali, 2. Jarrod McInally, 3. Shane Neumann, 4. Hymel Hunt, 5. Richie Kennar, 6. Cody Walker, 7. Liam Tyson, 8. Steven Thorpe (c), 9. Tom Butterfield, 10. Felise Kaufusi, 11. Dane Hogan, 12. Troy Giess, 13. Jacob Ling.
Interchange: 14. Liam McDonald, 15. George Rose, 16. Foisa Peni, 17. Joel Romelo.
Coach: Craig Ingebrigtsen.
- Note: Match postponed by QRL due to Cyclone Ita.
  QRL Competitions Manager Jamie O'Connor said "Although there was high anticipation for this match, Mother Nature has had other plans. Cyclone Ita is bearing down on the region and the decision was made to postpone the match until July 6. These decisions are never easy, we always try to consider all options with the safety and welfare of the clubs our first priority. One of those alternatives was bringing the Northern Pride to Brisbane this weekend, however we felt that it was more important for the players and coaching staff to remain with their families. The match will now be played on Sunday, July 6 at Barlow Park in Cairns, a bye round for all other clubs due to the annual Residents match between Queensland and New South Wales on July 9.

Position	Round 7 – 2014	P	W	D	L	B	For	Against	Diff	Pts
2	Northern Pride	5	5	0	0	1	152	78	+74	12

ROUND 8: Intrust Super Cup 2014

Saturday
19 April 2014
17:00 AEST (UTC+10)

Ipswich Jets	24 – 18	Northern Pride
Tries: Brendon Marshall 2 Javarn White 1 Sam Martin 1 Goals: Wes Conlon (4 from 4) 4	Half-time: 0 – 18; QRL Report; Cairns Post Preview; Cairns Post Preview; Cairns Post Preview; Sunshine Coast Daily Preview; Cairns Post Report; Cairns Post Report; Cairns Post Report; Sunshine Coast Daily Report	Tries: 1 Jason Roos; 1 Ethan Lowe*; 1 Cameron King*; Goals: 3 Shaun Nona (3 from 3)

North Ipswich Reserve
(Ipswich, QLD)

Sea Swift Northern Pride: 1. Javid Bowen* – FB 2. Justin Castellaro – WG 3. Brett Anderson (c) – CE 4. Davin Crampton – CE 5. Menmuny Murgha – WG 6. Shaun Nona – FE 7. Sam Obst – HB 20. Ricky Thorby* – PR 9. Jason Roos (c) – HK 10. Alex Starmer – PR 11. Ethan Lowe* – SR 12. Tyrone McCarthy – SR 13. Ben Spina – LK
Interchange: 14. Cameron King*, 15. Blake Leary, 16. Jack Svendsen, 17. Sheldon Powe-Hobbs.
* = Cowboys allocation.
Unavailable: Semi Tadulala (pectoral injury), Patrick Kaufusi* (pectoral), Hezron Murgha (knee), Kyle Feldt* (called up to play for the Cowboys).
Ipswich Jets: 1. Javarn White, 2. Kurt Capewell, 3. Nemani Valekapa, 4. Brendon Marshall, 5. Tautalatasi Tasi, 6. Josh Cleeland, 7. Dane Phillips, 8. Kurtis Lingwoodock, 9. Troy O'Sullivan, 10. Rod Griffin, 11. Josh Seage, 12. Sam Martin, 13. Keiron Lander (c).
Interchange: 14. Tariki Peneha, 17. Marmin Barba, 19. Wes Conlon, 22. Matt Parcell.
Coach: Shane Walker and Ben Walker.
- Note: The Pride had only played one game in the last three weeks because of the Bye and Postponed game.
  The Pride were 18-0 at half-time, but surrendered their lead in the second half to lose their first game of the year.
  This was the Pride debut for Jack Svendsen (Pride Player 102), and Menmuny Murgha, who came off injured with a head knock and could not remember much of the match (Pride Player 105).
  The game was called live on Phoenix Radio, Ipswich's only community based radio station.

Position	Round 8 – 2014	P	W	D	L	B	For	Against	Diff	Pts
2	Northern Pride	6	5	0	1	1	170	102	+68	12

ROUND 9: Intrust Super Cup 2014

Saturday
26 April 2014
17:30 AEST (UTC+10)

Northern Pride	24 – 22	Souths Logan Magpies
Tries: Javid Bowen* 2 Robert Lui* 1 Kyle Feldt* 1 Goals: Kyle Feldt* (4 from 4) 4	Half-time: 6 – 12; QRL Report; Cairns Post Preview; Cairns Post Preview; Cairns Post Report; Cairns Post Report	Tries: 1 Rhys Jacks; 1 Andrew Edwards; 1 Jack Ahearn; 1 Leon Panapa; Goals: 3 Jordan Rapana (3 from 4)

Barlow Park
(Severin Street, Parramatta Park, QLD)
Referee: Rob Gallacher

Sea Swift Northern Pride: 1. Jordan Biondi-Odo – FB 22. Kyle Feldt* – WG 3. Javid Bowen* – CE 4. Davin Crampton – CE 18. Semi Tadulala – WG 19. Robert Lui* – FE 7. Sam Obst – HB 20. Ricky Thorby* – PR 9. Jason Roos (c) – HK 10. Alex Starmer – PR 21. Latu Fifita – SR 12. Tyrone McCarthy – SR 13. Ben Spina – LK
Interchange: 14. Cameron King*, 15. Blake Leary, 16. Jack Svendsen, 17. Sheldon Powe-Hobbs.
* = Cowboys allocation.
Unavailable: Patrick Kaufusi* (pectoral), Hezron Murgha (knee), Brett Anderson (ill).
Souths Logan Magpies: 1. Luke Archer, 2. Ramon Filipine, 3. Max Dudley, 4. Grant Cooke, 5. Jordan Rapana, 6. Jack Ahearn, 7. Rhys Jacks, 8. Zac Lemberg, 9. Kurt Baptiste, 10. Andrew Edwards, 11. Shane Duck, 12. Darcy Wright, 13. Phil Dennis (c).
Interchange: 14. Mitch Cronin, 15. Leon Panapa, 16. Rez Phillips, 17. Johnny Vuetibau, 18. Steve Liki.
Coach: Josh Hannay.
- Note: This was the Pride's 150th QCup game (won 98, drawn 3, lost 49).

Position	Round 9 – 2014	P	W	D	L	B	For	Against	Diff	Pts
1	Northern Pride	7	6	0	1	1	194	124	+70	14

ROUND 10: Intrust Super Cup 2014 – XXXX Rivalry Round (Queensland Country Health Fund Cup)

Saturday
3 May 2014
17:30 AEST (UTC+10)

Northern Pride	22 – 18	Mackay Cutters
Tries: Ben Spina 1 Ethan Lowe* 1 Jason Roos 1 Blake Leary 1 Goals: Kyle Feldt* (3 from 4) 3	Half-time: 10 – 4 Sin Bin: Davin Crampton ----- QRL Report; Cairns Post Preview; QRL Report; Cairns Post Report	Tries: 2 John Asiata; 1 Zac Santo; 1 Liam Taylor Goals: 1 Liam Taylor (1 from 4)

Barlow Park
(Severin Street, Parramatta Park, QLD)
Referee: Jarrod Cole

Sea Swift Northern Pride: 1. Davin Crampton – FB 2. Semi Tadulala – WG 3. Brett Anderson (c) – CE 4. Javid Bowen* – CE 5. Kyle Feldt* – WG 6. Robert Lui* – FE 7. Sam Obst – HB 20. Ricky Thorby* – PR 9. Jason Roos (c) – HK 10. Alex Starmer – PR 11. Ethan Lowe* – SR 12. Tyrone McCarthy – SR 13. Ben Spina – LK
Interchange: 14. Cameron King*, 15. Blake Leary, 16. Joel Riethmuller*, 21. Latu Fifita.
* = Cowboys allocation.
Unavailable: Patrick Kaufusi* (pectoral), Hezron Murgha (knee).
Absolute Enterprises Mackay Cutters: 1. Zac Santo, 2. Liam Taylor, 3. Tyson Martin (c), 4. Josh Benjamin, 5. James Uhatafe, 6. Brent Warr, 7. Tom Rouse, 8. Sam Hoare, 9. Anthony Mitchell, 10. Karl Davies, 11. John Asiata, 12. Chris Gesch, 13. Kelvin Nielsen.
Interchange: 14. Aleki Falepaini, 15. Rohan Ahern, 16. Ryan Kinlyside, 17. Mitch Day, 18. Dave Petersen, 19. Doug Hewitt, 20. Andy Gay.
Coach: Kim Williams.
- Note: The QCup match was played after the Cyril Connell Challenge Grand Final (1.45pm) and Mal Meninga Cup Grand Final (2:55pm) – the first time Academy Grand Finals had been held at Barlow Park. The Pride U-16s were the Club's first Academy side to make a Grand Final, and they beat the Townsville Stingers 14-12.

Position	Round 10 – 2014	P	W	D	L	B	For	Against	Diff	Pts
1	Northern Pride	8	7	0	1	1	216	142	+74	16

ROUND 11: Intrust Super Cup 2014

Sunday
11 May 2014
14:00 AEST (UTC+10)

Tweed Heads Seagulls	29 – 26	Northern Pride
Tries: Kalifa Faifai Loa 3 Tom Merritt 1 Cory Blair 1 Goals: Blake Anderson 4 Field Goal: Michael Burgess 1	QRL Report; Cairns Post Preview; Cairns Post Preview; Cairns Post Preview; Cairns Post Preview; Pride Report; QRL Video; QRL Report	Tries: 2 Semi Tadulala; 1 Davin Crampton; 1 Kyle Feldt*; 1 Ben Spina; Goals: 3 Kyle Feldt*; Field Goal:

Piggabeen Sports Complex
(Caramar Drive, Tweed Heads West, NSW)
Referee: Chris Anderson
Player of the Match: Kalifa Faifai Loa.

Sea Swift Northern Pride: 1. Davin Crampton – FB 22. Semi Tadulala – WG 3. Brett Anderson (c) – CE 4. Jared Allen – CE 5. Kyle Feldt* – WG 6. Shaun Nona – FE 7. Sam Obst – HB 20. Ricky Thorby* – PR 14. Justin Castellaro – HK 10. Alex Starmer – PR 11. Jack Svendsen – SR 12. Tyrone McCarthy – SR 13. Ben Spina – LK
Interchange: 14. Ryan Ghietti, 15. Blake Leary, 16. Joel Riethmuller*, 17. Sheldon Powe-Hobbs.
* = Cowboys allocation
Unavailable: Patrick Kaufusi* (pectoral), Javid Bowen*, Hezron Murgha (knee), Jason Roos.
Tweed Heads Seagulls: 1. Jamal Fogarty, 2. Kalifa Faifai Loa, 3. Luke Dumas, 4. Blake Anderson, 5. Tom Merritt, 6. Sam Irwin, 7. Michael Burgess, 8. Damian Sironen, 9. Matt King (c), 10. Pele Peletelese, 11. Cody Nelson, 12. Cory Blair, 13. Tom Kingston.
Interchange: 14. Matt Srama, 15. Sam Saville, 16. Chris Piper, 17. Reg Saunders, 18. Caleb Binge.
Coach: Aaron Zimmerle.
- Note: Broadcast live on Channel 9 with Matthew Thompson, Scott Sattler and Adrian Vowles as the commentary team.
  This was the Pride debut for Jared Allen (Pride Player 103).

Position	Round 11 – 2014	P	W	D	L	B	For	Against	Diff	Pts
3	Northern Pride	9	7	0	2	1	242	171	+71	16

ROUND 12: Intrust Super Cup 2014

Saturday
17 May 2014
17:30 AEST (UTC+10)

Northern Pride	26 – 10	Burleigh Bears
Tries: Hezron Murgha 1 Javid Bowen* 1 Blake Leary 1 Jason Roos 1 Goals: Shaun Nona (4 from 4) 4 Penalty Goal: Shaun Nona 1	Half-time: 8 – 10; QRL Report; Cairns Post Preview; Cairns Post Preview; Cairns Post Preview; QRL Video	Tries: 1 Brad Tighe; 1 Zac Mackay Goals: 1 Zac Mackay (1 from 2); Penalty Goal:

Barlow Park
(Severin Street, Parramatta Park, QLD)
Referee: Tim Rutherford

Sea Swift Northern Pride: 1. Hezron Murgha – FB 5. Kyle Feldt* – WG 3. Brett Anderson (c) – CE 4. Javid Bowen* – CE 22. Semi Tadulala – WG 6. Shaun Nona – FE 19. Ryan Ghietti – HB 8. Ben Spina – PR 9. Sam Obst (c) – HK 20. Ricky Thorby* – PR 11. Blake Leary – SR 12. Tyrone McCarthy – SR 13. Davin Crampton – LK
Interchange: 14. Jason Roos, 15. Joel Riethmuller*, 16. Sheldon Powe-Hobbs, 17. Alex Starmer.
* = Cowboys allocation.
Unavailable: Robert Lui*, Matthew Wright* and Ethan Lowe* playing for North Queensland Cowboys, Latu Fifita (knee).
Burleigh Bears: 1. Henare Wells, 2. Brad Tighe, 3. Steve Michaels, 4. Corbin Kiernan, 5. Zac Mackay, 6. Matt Beddow, 7. Ryley Jacks, 8. Mark Ioane, 9. Matt Keating, 10. Matt Bell, 11. James Dunley, 12. Kyle McConnell, 13. Darren Griffiths (c).
Interchange: 14. Nafe Seluini, 15. Siuatonga Likiliki, 16. Chris Kitching, 17. Nick Harrold, 18. Jesse Malcolm.
Coach: Jimmy Lenihan.
- Note: Hezron Murgha's return from knee injury suffered in July last year when playing for the North Queensland Cowboys.

Position	Round 12 – 2014	P	W	D	L	B	For	Against	Diff	Pts
1	Northern Pride	10	8	0	2	1	268	181	+87	18

ROUND 13: Intrust Super Cup 2014

Saturday
24 May 2014
17:30 AEST (UTC+10)

Northern Pride	36 – 24	Wynnum Manly Seagulls
Tries: Justin Castellaro 2 Shaun Nona 1 Jason Roos 1 Blake Leary 1 Tyrone McCarthy 1 Davin Crampton 1 Goals: Shaun Nona (4 from 7) 4 Field Goal: Shaun Nona (0 from 1)	Half-time: 30 – 6 QRL Report; Cairns Post Preview; Cairns Post Report; Cairns Post Report; Cairns Post Report; QRL Video	Tries: 1 Jordan Kahu; 1 Ben Cronin; 1 Matt Grieve; 1 Dylan Smith Goals: 4 Matt Seamark (4 from 4); Field Goal:

Barlow Park
(Severin Street, Parramatta Park, QLD)

Sea Swift Northern Pride: 1. Hezron Murgha – FB 20. Justin Castellaro – WG 3. Brett Anderson (c) – CE 4. Javid Bowen* – CE 5. Semi Tadulala – WG 6. Shaun Nona – FE 7. Sam Obst – HB 8. Ben Spina – PR 9. Jason Roos (c) – HK 10. Alex Starmer – PR 11. Blake Leary – SR 12. Tyrone McCarthy – SR 13. Davin Crampton – LK
Interchange: 14. Ryan Ghietti, 15. Jack Svendsen, 16. Sheldon Powe-Hobbs, 18. Tom Hancock.
* = Cowboys allocation.
Unavailable: The only Cowboys player available was Javid Bowen*. All the Cowboys allocation played in Townsville as Thurston, Tata, Tamou and Scott were selected for Origin I.
Wynnum Manly Seagulls: 1. Jeriah Goodrich, 2. Peter Gubb, 3. Matt Grieve, 4. Mitchell Buckett, 5. Jordan Kahu, 6. Ben Cronin, 7. Matt Seamark, 8. Ben Shea, 9. Mitchell Moore, 10. Tim Natusch (c), 11. Graham Clark, 12. John Te Reo, 13. Mitchell Frei.
Interchange: 14. Jon Grieve, 15. Stephen Coombe, 16. Tanu Wulf, 17. Dylan Smith.
Coach: Jon Buchanan.
- Note: This was Brett Anderson's 100th game for the Pride, and Blake Leary's 50th game for the Pride.

Position	Round 13 – 2014	P	W	D	L	B	For	Against	Diff	Pts
1	Northern Pride	11	9	0	2	1	304	205	+99	20

ROUND 14: Intrust Super Cup 2014

Sunday
1 June 2014
14:00 AEST (UTC+10)

Redcliffe Dolphins	22 – 24	Northern Pride
Tries: Oliver Regan 2 Liam Georgetown 1 Jon Green 1 Goals: Adrian Davis (3 from 4) 3	Half-time: 6 – 18. QRL Report; Cairns Post Preview; Cairns Post Report; Dolphin TV	Tries: 2 Davin Crampton; 1 Joel Riethmuller*; 1 Ben Spina; Goals: 4 Shaun Nona (4 from 4)

Dolphin Oval
(Klingner Road, Redcliffe, QLD)
Referee: Peter Gough

Sea Swift Northern Pride: 1. Hezron Murgha – FB 2. Justin Castellaro – WG 3. Brett Anderson (c) – CE 4. Javid Bowen* – CE 20. Semi Tadulala – WG 6. Shaun Nona – FE 7. Sam Obst – HB 8. Ben Spina – PR 9. Jason Roos (c) – HK 10. Alex Starmer – PR 11. Blake Leary – SR 12. Tyrone McCarthy – SR 16. Sheldon Powe-Hobbs – LK
Interchange: 13. Davin Crampton, 14. Ryan Ghietti, 17. Joel Riethmuller*, 21. Ricky Thorby*.
* = Cowboys allocation.
Redcliffe Dolphins: 1. Paul Byrnes, 2. Oliver Regan, 3. Aaron Whitchurch, 4. Marty Hatfield (c), 5. Liam Georgetown, 6. Zach Strasser, 7. Adrian Davis, 8. Martin Cordwell, 9. Cameron Cullen, 10. Jon Green (c), 11. Sarafu Fatiaki, 12. Joe Bradley, 13. James Ackerman.
Interchange: 14. Tom Rowles, 16. Tom Geraghty, 17. Caleb Hoffman.
Coach: Troy Lindsay.
- Note: Semi Tadulala's 100th QCup game, having played for the Pride, Townsville, Wests and North. Tadulala's first QCup game was in 1998, and he is the second oldest player in the competition (after the Dolphin's Petero Civoniceva).

Position	Round 14 – 2014	P	W	D	L	B	For	Against	Diff	Pts
1	Northern Pride	12	10	0	2	1	328	227	+101	22

ROUND 15: Intrust Super Cup 2014

Saturday
7 June 2014
18:00 AEST (UTC+10)

Sunshine Coast Falcons	14 – 15	Northern Pride
Tries: Brett Doherty 2 Goals: Ryan Hansen (2 from 2) 2 Penalty Goal: Ryan Hansen 1 Field Goal:	QRL Report; Pride Preview; Cairns Post Report; QRL Video	Tries: 1 Javid Bowen*; 1 Blake Leary; 1 Tyrone McCarthy; Goals: 1 Shaun Nona (1 from 3); Penalty Goal: Field Goal: 1 Sam Obst

Stockland Park
(Sportsmans Parade, Bokarina, Kawana Waters, QLD)
Referee: Brett Suttor

Sea Swift Northern Pride: 1. Hezron Murgha – FB 20. Kyle Feldt* – WG 3. Justin Castellaro – CE 4. Javid Bowen* – CE 5. Semi Tadulala – WG 6. Shaun Nona – FE 7. Sam Obst – HB 8. Ben Spina – PR 9. Jason Roos (c) – HK 21. Ricky Thorby* – PR 11. Blake Leary – SR 12. Jack Svendsen – SR 13. Davin Crampton – LK
Interchange: 14. Ryan Ghietti, 15. Tyrone McCarthy, 16. Sheldon Powe-Hobbs, 17. Joel Riethmuller*.
* = Cowboys allocation.
SC Falcons: 1. Callum Klein, 2. Joe Meninga, 3. Rowan Klein, 4. Rueben Baillie, 5. Kyle Van Klaveren, 6. Brett Doherty, 7. David Oakes, 8. Mboya Adams, 9. Jay Lobwein, 10. Ryan Hansen (c), 11. Jaz Nahu-Main, 12. Jacob Samoa, 13. Tom Murphy.
Interchange: 14. James Leavai, 15. Matt Gilliman, 16. Denman Ah-You, 17. Matthew Saunima'a.
Coach: Glen Dreger.

Position	Round 15 – 2014	P	W	D	L	B	For	Against	Diff	Pts
1	Northern Pride	13	11	0	2	1	343	241	+102	24

ROUND 16: Intrust Super Cup 2014

Sunday
15 June 2014
14:00 AEST (UTC+10)

Easts Tigers	20 – 44	Northern Pride
Tries: Jarrod McInally 3 Donald Malone 1 Goals: Donald Malone (2 from 3) 2	Half-time: 0 – 22. QRL Report; Cairns Post Preview; Cairns Post Preview; Cairns Post Report	Tries: 2 Davin Crampton; 1 Robert Lui*; 1 Jack Svendsen; 2 Blake Leary; 1Brett Anderson; 1 Kyle Feldt*; Goals: 6 Shaun Nona (6 from 8)

Langlands Park
(Stones Corner, Brisbane, QLD)
Referee: Peter Gough.

Sea Swift Northern Pride: 1. Hezron Murgha – FB 18. Robert Lui* – WG 3. Brett Anderson (c) – CE 4. Javid Bowen* – CE 22. Kyle Feldt* – WG 6. Shaun Nona – FE 7. Sam Obst – HB 8. Ben Spina – PR 9. Jason Roos (c) – HK 10. Alex Starmer – PR 11. Blake Leary – SR 12. Tyrone McCarthy – SR 13. Davin Crampton – LK
Interchange: 14. Jack Svendsen, 15. Sheldon Powe-Hobbs, 16. Joel Riethmuller*, 20. Ricky Thorby*.
* = Cowboys allocation.
Easts Tigers: 1. Eddie Tautali, 2. Dane Chang, 3. Shane Neumann, 4. Donald Malone, 5. Jarrod McInally, 6. Jacob Fauid, 7. Grant Giess, 8. Steven Thorpe (c), 9. Tom Butterfield, 10. Matthew Zgrajewski, 11. Dane Hogan, 12. Troy Giess, 13. Jacob Ling.
Interchange: 14. Liam McDonald, 15. Christian Welch, 16. Foisa Peni, 17. Liam Tyson.
Coach: Craig Ingebrigtsen.
- Note: Broadcast live on Channel 9 with Matthew Thompson, Scott Sattler and Adrian Vowles as the commentary team.

Position	Round 16 – 2014	P	W	D	L	B	For	Against	Diff	Pts
1	Northern Pride	14	12	0	2	1	387	261	+126	26

ROUND 17: Intrust Super Cup 2014

Saturday
21 June 2014
17:30 AEST (UTC+10)

Northern Pride	42 – 4	CQ Capras
Tries: Javid Bowen* 2 Sam Obst 2 Kyle Feldt* 1 Jason Roos 1 Tyrone McCarthy 1 Goals: Shaun Nona (6 from 7) 6 Penalty Goal: Kyle Feldt* 1	Half-time: 12 – 4 QRL Report; Cairns Post Preview; Pride Report; Cairns Post Report	Tries: 1 Gavin Hiscox Goals: Rhys Williams (0 from 1); Penalty Goal:

Barlow Park
(Severin Street, Parramatta Park, QLD)
Referee: Nick Morel.

Sea Swift Northern Pride: 1. Hezron Murgha – FB 5. Javid Bowen* – WG 4. Davin Crampton – CE 21. Latu Fifita – CE 22. Kyle Feldt* – WG 6. Shaun Nona – FE 7. Sam Obst – HB 8. Ben Spina – PR 9. Jason Roos (c) – HK 10. Alex Starmer – PR 11. Blake Leary – SR 12. Tyrone McCarthy – SR 13. Joel Riethmuller* – LK
Interchange: 14. Ryan Ghietti, 15. Jack Svendsen, 16. Sheldon Powe-Hobbs, 17. Semi Tadulala.
* = Cowboys allocation.
Unavailable: Brett Anderson.
CQ Capras: 1. Reece Baker, 2. Hayden Buckman, 3. Hughie Stanley, 4. Smith Samau, 5. Rhys Williams, 6. Mark Johnstone, 7. Marlon Doak, 8. Andrew Dale, 9. Theeran Pearson, 10. Peter Gallen, 11. John Clayton, 12. Guy Williams, 13. Gavin Hiscox (c).
Interchange: 14. Tom McKenzie, 15. Joel Marama, 17. Sam Madden, 18. Tyson White.
Coach: Jason Hetherington.

Position	Round 17 – 2014	P	W	D	L	B	For	Against	Diff	Pts
1	Northern Pride	15	13	0	2	1	429	265	+164	28

ROUND 18: Intrust Super Cup 2014

Sunday
29 June 2014
14:10 AEST (UTC+10)

Northern Pride	36 – 18	Papua New Guinea Hunters
Tries: Blake Leary 2 Hezron Murgha 1 Kyle Feldt* 1 Javid Bowen* 1 Shaun Nona 1 Tyrone McCarthy 1 Goals: Shaun Nona (4 from 7) 4	Half-time: 18 – 6 QRL Report; Cairns Post Preview; Cairns Post Preview; Cairns Post Preview; Cairns Post Preview; Cairns Post Report; QRL Video; KVG Kumul Video	Tries: 4 Garry Lo Goals: 1 Noel Zemming (1 from 4)

Barlow Park
(Severin Street, Parramatta Park, QLD)
Attendance: 4,390 (Record home crowd)
Referee: Michael Wise

Sea Swift Northern Pride: 1. Hezron Murgha – FB 22. Kyle Feldt* – WG 3. Davin Crampton – CE 4. Javid Bowen* – CE 5. Semi Tadulala – WG 6. Shaun Nona – FE 7. Sam Obst – HB 8. Ben Spina – PR 9. Jason Roos (c) – HK 10. Alex Starmer – PR 11. Blake Leary – SR 12. Tyrone McCarthy – SR 13. Jack Svendsen – LK
Interchange: 14. Ryan Ghietti, 15. Ricky Thorby*, 16. Sheldon Powe-Hobbs, 21. Latu Fifita.
* = Cowboys allocation.
Unavailable: Brett Anderson.
SP PNG Hunters: 1. Adex Wera, 2. Garry Lo, 3. Noel Zemming, 4. Israel Eliab (c), 5. Edward Goma, 6. Dion Aiye, 7. Roger Laka, 8. Willie Minoga, 9. Wartovo Puara Jr, 10. Esau Siune, 11. George Benson, 12. David Loko, 13. Adam Korave.
Interchange: 14. Lawrence Tu'u, 15. Buiku Tiger Emere, 16. Sebastian Pandia, 17. Jason Tali, 18. Brandy Peter.
Coach: Michael Marum.
- Note: Match broadcast live on Channel 9 with Matthew Thompson, Scott Sattler and Adrian Vowles as the commentary team.

Position	Round 18 – 2014	P	W	D	L	B	For	Against	Diff	Pts
1	Northern Pride	16	14	0	2	1	465	283	+182	30

DELAYED ROUND 7: Intrust Super Cup 2014

Saturday
5 July 2014
17:30 AEST (UTC+10)

Northern Pride	4 – 16	Easts Tigers
Tries: Brett Anderson 1 Goals: Kyle Feldt (0 from 1) 0	Half-time: 4 – 16; Sin bin: Kyle Feldt*; Joel Romelo ----- QRL Report; QRL Preview; Pride Report; Cairns Post Report; QRL Report; QRL Video	Tries: 3 Marika Koroibete; Goals: 2 Donald Malone (2 from 3)

Davies Park
(Mareeba, QLD)
Referee: Chris Anderson

Sea Swift Northern Pride: 1. Hezron Murgha – FB 22. Kyle Feldt* – WG 3. Justin Castellaro – CE 4. Brett Anderson (c) – CE 5. Semi Tadulala – WG 6. Ryan Ghietti – FE 7. Sam Obst – HB 9. Jason Roos (c) – HK 10. Alex Starmer – PR 18. Menmuny Murgha11 – PR 21. Latu Fifita – SR 12. Tyrone McCarthy – SR 13. Tom Hancock – LK
Interchange: 14. Jordon Biondi-Odo, 15. Jack Svendsen, 16. Sheldon Powe-Hobbs, 17. PJ Webb.
* = Cowboys allocation.
Unavailable: Javid Bowen*, Davin Crampton, Shaun Nona, Blake Leary selected for Queensland Residents (plus Jason Demetriou as Residents' coach). Ben Spina selected to play for the North Queensland Cowboys.
Easts Tigers: 1. Cameron Munster, 2. Eddie Tautali, 3. Jarrod McInally, 4. Donald Malone, 5. Marika Koroibete, 6. Jacob Fauid, 7. Liam Tyson, 8. Steven Thorpe (c), 9. Tom Butterfield, 10. Kenny Bromwich, 11. Tim Glasby, 12. Troy Giess, 13. Jacob Ling.
Interchange: 14. Liam McDonald, 15. Foisa Peni, 16. Matthew Zgrajewski, 17. Joel Romelo.
Coach: Craig Ingebrigtsen.
- Note: This Round 7 match was due to be played on Saturday, 12 April 2014 at 5.30pm, but was postponed due to Cyclone Ita.
  This was the Pride debut for PJ Webb (Pride Player 104).

Position	Round 7 – 2014	P	W	D	L	B	For	Against	Diff	Pts
1	Northern Pride	17	14	0	3	1	469	299	+170	30

ROUND 19: Intrust Super Cup 2014

12–13 July 2014

Northern Pride	BYE

Position	Round 19 – 2014	P	W	D	L	B	For	Against	Diff	Pts
1	Northern Pride	17	14	0	3	2	469	299	+170	32

ROUND 20: Intrust Super Cup 2014

Sunday
20 July 2014
14:00 AEST (UTC+10)

Northern Pride	52 – 18	Norths Devils
Tries: Blake Leary 2 Tyrone McCarthy 2 Davin Crampton 1 Shaun Nona 1 Ben Spina 1 Kyle Feldt* 1 Ricky Thorby* 1 Goals: Shaun Nona (8 from 9) 8	QRL Report; Cairns Post Preview; Cairns Post Preview; Cairns Post Report; QRL Report; QRL Video	Tries: 3 Shaun Carney 3 Goals: 3 Darren Nicholls (3 from 3)

Barlow Park
(Severin Street, Parramatta Park, QLD)
Referee: Tim Rutherford

Sea Swift Northern Pride: 1. Hezron Murgha – FB 2. Javid Bowen* – WG 3. Brett Anderson (c) – CE 22. Kyle Feldt* – CE 5. Semi Tadulala – WG 6. Shaun Nona – FE 7. Sam Obst – HB 8. Ben Spina – PR 9. Jason Roos (c) – HK 10. Alex Starmer – PR 11. Blake Leary – SR 12. Tyrone McCarthy – SR 13. Davin Crampton – LK
Interchange: 14. Ryan Ghietti 16. Sheldon Powe-Hobbs 20. Ricky Thorby* 21. Latu Fifita
* = Cowboys allocation.
Unavailable: Jack Svendsen (knee), Justin Castellaro (leg).
Norths Devils: 1. Shaun Carney, 2. Michael Lucas, 3. Joel Bailey, 4. Tristan Lumley, 5. Kainga Turner, 6. Todd Murphy, 7. Darren Nicholls, 8. Mark Vaiao, 9. Krys Freeman, 10. Brendon Gibb (c), 11. Chris Faust, 12. Jai Ingram, 13. James Sharkie.
Interchange: 14. Sam Foster, 16. Troyden Watene, 15. Josh Jaggle, 18. Byron Creighton.
Coach: Mark Gliddon.

Position	Round 20 – 2014	P	W	D	L	B	For	Against	Diff	Pts
1	Northern Pride	18	15	0	3	2	521	317	+204	34

ROUND 21: Intrust Super Cup 2014

Sunday
27 July 2014
15:00 AEST (UTC+10)

Wynnum Manly Seagulls	20 – 28	Northern Pride
Tries: Mitchell Buckett 2 Peter Gubb 1 Chris McLean 1 Goals: Matt Seamark (2 from 4) 2 Penalty Goal:	QRL Report; Cairns Post Preview; Cairns Post Preview	Tries: 1 Javid Bowen*; 2 Kyle Feldt*; 1 Hezron Murgha; 2 Sheldon Powe-Hobbs; Goals: 1 Shaun Nona (1 from 6); Penalty Goal: 1 Shaun Nona (1 from 1)

BMD Kougari Oval
(Manly West, Brisbane, QLD)
Referee: Clayton Sharpe.

Sea Swift Northern Pride: 1. Hezron Murgha – FB 2. Javid Bowen* – WG 19. Linc Port – CE 22. Kyle Feldt* – CE 5. Semi Tadulala – WG 6. Shaun Nona – FE 7. Sam Obst – HB 8. Ben Spina – PR 9. Jason Roos (c) – HK 10. Alex Starmer – PR 11. Blake Leary – SR 12. Tyrone McCarthy – SR 13. Davin Crampton – LK
Interchange: 14. Ryan Ghietti, 16. Sheldon Powe-Hobbs, 17. Tom Hancock, 21. Latu Fifita.
* = Cowboys allocation.
Unavailable: Brett Anderson (hamstring), Jack Svendsen (knee), Justin Castellaro (leg).
Wynnum-Manly Seagulls: 1. Daniel Ogden, 2. Peter Gubb, 3. Matt Grieve, 4. Mitchell Buckett, 5. Benaiah Bowie, 6. Ben Cronin, 7. Matt Seamark, 8. Tanu Wulf, 9. Alehana Mara, 10. Timothy Natusch (c), 11. Jon Grieve, 12. Graham Clark, 13. Mitchell Frei.
Interchange: 14. John Te Reo, 15. Stephen Coombe, 16. Chris Mclean, 17. Dylan Smith.
Coach: Jon Buchanan.
- Note: This was the Pride debut for Linc Port (Pride Player 106).

Position	Round 21 – 2014	P	W	D	L	B	For	Against	Diff	Pts
1	Northern Pride	19	16	0	3	2	549	337	+212	36

ROUND 22: Intrust Super Cup 2014

Sunday
3 August 2014
12:30 AEST (UTC+10)

Northern Pride	22 – 18	Tweed Heads Seagulls
Tries: Davin Crampton 2 Linc Port 1 Sam Obst 1 Goals: Shaun Nona (3 from 4) 3	Half-time: 18 – 6 Sin Bin: Jason Roos; Matt King ----- QRL Report; Pride Preview; NRL Preview; Pride Report; QRL Video	Tries: 1 Cory Blair; 1 Ayden Lee; 1 Damian Sironen; Goals: 3 Jamal Fogarty (3 from 3)

Barlow Park
(Severin Street, Parramatta Park, QLD)
Attendance: 11,750
Referee: Clayton Sharpe

Sea Swift Northern Pride: 19. Ben Jeffries – FB 2. Linc Port – WG 3. Javid Bowen* – CE 22. Kyle Feldt* – CE 5. Semi Tadulala – WG 6. Shaun Nona – FE 7. Sam Obst – HB 8. Ben Spina – PR 9. Jason Roos (c) – HK 10. Alex Starmer – PR 11. Blake Leary – SR 12. Tyrone McCarthy – SR 13. Davin Crampton – LK
Interchange: 15. Jack Svendsen, 16. Sheldon Powe-Hobbs, 17. Tom Hancock, 20. Ethan Lowe*.
* = Cowboys allocation
Unavailable: Brett Anderson (hamstring), Hezron Murgha (hamstring), Latu Fifita (head knock), Ryan Ghietti, Justin Castellaro (leg).
Tweed Heads Seagulls: 1. Jamal Fogarty, 2. Blake Anderson, 3. Luke Dumas, 4. James Wood (c), 5. Tom Merritt, 6. Sam Irwin, 7. Michael Burgess, 8. Pele Peletelese, 9. Matt King (c), 10. Damian Sironen, 11. Cory Blair, 12. Tom Kingston, 13. Sam Saville.
Interchange: 14. Ricardo Parata, 15. Trent Richardson, 16. Lee, 17. Reg Saunders, 18. Caleb Binge.
Coach: Aaron Zimmerle
- Note: This match was played as the opener to the NRL Round 21 match between South Sydney Rabbitohs and Newcastle Knights and broadcast on Channel 9 (delayed telecast 2.00 pm) with Matthew Thompson, Scott Sattler and Adrian Vowles as the commentary team.
  Injuries: Alex Starmer (ankle), Javid Bowen* (ribs), Ben Jeffries (arm).
  This was the Pride debut for Ben Jeffries (Pride Player 107).

Position	Round 22 – 2014	P	W	D	L	B	For	Against	Diff	Pts
1	Northern Pride	20	17	0	3	2	571	355	+216	38

ROUND 23: Intrust Super Cup 2014 – Country Week

Saturday
9 August 2014
19:00 AEST (UTC+10)

Souths Logan Magpies	8 – 30	Northern Pride
Tries: Patrick Mago 1 Goals: Patrick Mago (1 from 1) 1 Penalty Goal: Patrick Mago 1	Half-time: 8 – 8 QRL Report; Cairns Post Preview	Tries: 2 Kyle Feldt*; 1 Linc Port; 1 Brett Anderson; 1 Davin Crampton; 1 Sam Obst; Goals: 3 Kyle Feldt* (3 from 3); 0 Shaun Nona (0 from 3); Penalty Goal:

Davies Park
(Mareeba QLD)
Referee: Liam Kennedy

Sea Swift Northern Pride: 1. Hezron Murgha – FB 2. Linc Port – WG 3. Brett Anderson (c) – CE 22. Kyle Feldt* – CE 5. Semi Tadulala – WG 6. Shaun Nona – FE 7. Sam Obst – HB 20. Ricky Thorby* – PR 9. Jason Roos (c) – HK 10. Joel Riethmuller* – PR 11. Ethan Lowe* – SR 12. Tyrone McCarthy – SR 13. Davin Crampton – LK
Interchange: 14. Ryan Ghietti, 15. Jack Svendsen, 16. Sheldon Powe-Hobbs, 17. Tom Hancock.
* = Cowboys allocation.
Unavailable: Alex Starmer (ankle), Javid Bowen* (ribs), Ben Jeffries (arm), Justin Castellaro (leg).
Souths Logan Magpies: 1. Ihaka Watene, 2. Luke Archer, 3. Dallas Anderson, 4. Tim Brooks, 5. Ramon Filipine, 6. Phil Dennis (c), 7. Ben Jackson, 8. Luke Page, 9. Mitch Cronin, 10. Andrew Edwards, 11. Darcy Wright, 12. Patrick Mago, 13. Luke Bateman.
Interchange: 14. Herschel Gideon, 15. Leon Panapa, 16. Rez Phillips, 17. Zac Lemberg.
Coach: Josh Hannay.
- Note: Pride won this match to secure the Minor-Premiership for the second time in two years.
  The Pride join Redcliffe Dolphins (1999–2000), Burleigh Bears (2003–2004) and Souths Logan (2009–2010), as the only successive Minor-Premiers.
  Coach Jason Demetriou became just the second QCup coach – after Rick Stone with the Bears in 2003–2004 – to claim back-to-back Minor-Premierships.
  This was the Pride's second game at Mareeba this year, and the seventh game played in a regional town in FNQ (Bamaga, Mt Isa, Yarrabah, 2 x Innisfail and 2 x Mareeba).

Position	Round 23 – 2014	P	W	D	L	B	For	Against	Diff	Pts
1	Northern Pride	21	18	0	3	2	601	363	+238	40

ROUND 24: Intrust Super Cup 2014

Saturday
16 August 2014
18:00 AEST (UTC+10)

Mackay Cutters	16 – 18	Northern Pride
Tries: Santo 1 Liam Taylor 1 Mitch Day 1 Goals; Liam Taylor (2 from 3) 2	QRL Report; Cairns Post Report; QRL Video	Tries: 1 Kyle Feldt*; 1 Latu Fifita; 1 Davin Crampton; Goals: 3 Shaun Nona (3 from 3)

Virgin Australia Stadium
(Bridge Road, South Mackay, QLD)
Referee: Chris Anderson

Sea Swift Northern Pride: 1. Hezron Murgha – FB 2. Linc Port – WG 3. Brett Anderson (c) – CE 22. Kyle Feldt* – CE 5. Semi Tadulala – WG 6. Shaun Nona – FE 7. Sam Obst – HB 21. Latu Fifita – PR 9. Jason Roos (c) – HK 10. Jack Svendsen – PR 11. Blake Leary – SR 12. Tyrone McCarthy – SR 13. Tom Hancock – LK
Interchange: 14. Ryan Ghietti, 15. Davin Crampton, 16. Sheldon Powe-Hobbs, 17. Ricky Thorby*.
* = Cowboys allocation.
Unavailable: Alex Starmer (ankle), Javid Bowen* (ribs), Ben Jeffries (arm), Ben Spina (hand), Justin Castellaro (leg).
Absolute Enterprises Mackay Cutters: 1. Zac Santo, 2. Liam Taylor (c), 3. Chris Ulugia, 4. Curtis Rona, 5. Justin Tavae, 6. Doug Hewitt, 7. Brentt Warr, 8. Dan Beasley, 9. Anthony Mitchell, 10. Karl Davies, 11. Kelvin Nielsen, 12. Chris Gesch, 13. Mitch Day.
Interchange: 15. Aleki Falepaini, 16. Josh Osborne, 17. Nico Mataia, 18. Dave Petersen, 19. Pulou Vaituutuu, 20. Ryan Kinlyside.
Coach: Kim Williams.

Position	Round 24 – 2014	P	W	D	L	B	For	Against	Diff	Pts
1	Northern Pride	22	19	0	3	2	619	379	+240	42

ROUND 25: Intrust Super Cup 2014

Saturday
23 August 2014
17:30 AEST (UTC+10)

Northern Pride	30 – 6	Ipswich Jets
Tries: Hezron Murgha 1 Jason Roos 1 Blake Leary 1 Davin Crampton 1 Javid Bowen* 1 Goals: Shaun Nona (5 from 5) 5	QRL Report; Cairns Post Preview; Cairns Post Preview; Cairns Post Report; Cairns Post Report; QRL Video	Tries: 1 Nemani Valekapa Goals: 1 Wes Conlon (1 from 1)

Barlow Park
(Severin Street, Parramatta Park, QLD)
Referee: Clayton Sharpe

Sea Swift Northern Pride: 1. Hezron Murgha – FB 18. Javid Bowen* – WG 3. Brett Anderson (c) – CE 22. Ethan Lowe* – CE 5. Semi Tadulala – WG 6. Shaun Nona – FE 7. Sam Obst – HB 8. Ricky Thorby* – PR 9. Jason Roos (c) – HK 10. Jack Svendsen – PR 11. Blake Leary – SR 12. Tyrone McCarthy – SR 13. Davin Crampton – LK
Interchange: 14. Ryan Ghietti, 15. Tom Hancock, 16. Patrick Kaufusi*, 17. Sheldon Powe-Hobbs.
* = Cowboys allocation.
Unavailable: Alex Starmer (ankle), Ben Jeffries (arm), Ben Spina (hand), Justin Castellaro (leg).
Ipswich Jets: 1. Javarn White, 2. Kurt Capewell, 3. Nemani Valekapa, 4. Brendon Marshall, 5. Carlin Anderson, 6. Josh Cleeland, 7. Dane Phillips, 8. Kurtis Lingwoodock, 9. Troy O`Sullivan, 10. Rod Griffin, 11. Joshua Seage, 12. Sam Martin, 13. Keiron Lander (c).
Interchange: 14. Billy McConnachie, 18. Marmin Barba, 19. Wes Conlon, 22. Matt Parcell.
Coach: Ben Walker and Shane Walker.
- Note: This victory meant the Pride had beaten all twelve QCup sides this season.
  This was the Pride debut for North Queensland Cowboys allocation player Patrick Kaufusi* (Pride Player 108).

Position	Round 25 – 2014	P	W	D	L	B	For	Against	Diff	Pts
1	Northern Pride	23	20	0	3	2	649	385	+264	44

ROUND 26: Intrust Super Cup 2014 – Turn to Me Round

Sunday
31 August 2014
14:00 AEST (UTC+10)

Burleigh Bears	29 – 28	Northern Pride
Tries: Henare Wells 1 Francis Veukiso 1 Jared Te'o 1 Daniel Schwass 1 Khan Ahwang 1 Goals: Khan Ahwang (4 from 5) 4 Field Goal; Khan Ahwang 1	QRL Report; Cairns Post Preview; Cairns Post Report; QRL Video	Tries: 1 Brett Anderson; 1 Davin Crampton; 1 Shaun Nona; 1 Jason Roos; 1 Jack Svendsen; Goals: 4 Shaun Nona (4 from 5); Field Goal

UAA Park
(Miami, Gold Coast, QLD)
Referee: Michael Gordon

Sea Swift Northern Pride: 1. Hezron Murgha – FB 2. Javid Bowen* – WG 3. Brett Anderson (c) – CE 22. Davin Crampton – CE 5. Semi Tadulala – WG 6. Shaun Nona – FE 7. Sam Obst – HB 20. Ricky Thorby* – PR 9. Jason Roos (c) – HK 10. Jack Svendsen – PR 11. Blake Leary – SR 12. Tyrone McCarthy – SR 13. Patrick Kaufusi* – LK
Interchange: 15. Tom Hancock, 16. Sheldon Powe-Hobbs, 21. Latu Fifita, 22. Ethan Lowe*.
* = Cowboys allocation.
Unavailable: Alex Starmer (ankle), Ben Spina (hand), Justin Castellaro (leg).
Burleigh Bears: 1. Henare Wells, 2. Corbin Kiernan, 3. Dimitri Pelo, 21. Francis Veukiso, 5. Jared Te'o, 6. Daniel Schwass, 7. Tyler Chadburn, 8. Chris Kitching, 9. Nafe Seluini, 10. Matt Bell, 11. Shane Gray, 12. Louis Fanene, 13. Darren Griffiths (c).
Interchange: 15. Jamie Anderson, 16. Jake Hughes, 17. Tim Wolens, 18. Khan Ahwang.
Coach: Jim Lenihan.

Position	Round 26 – 2014	P	W	D	L	B	For	Against	Diff	Pts
1	Northern Pride	24	20	0	4	2	677	414	+263	44

=== 2014 ladder ===
	Team	Pld	W	D	L	B	PF	PA	PD	Pts
1	Northern Pride	24	20	0	4	2	677	414	263	44
2	Wynnum Manly Seagulls	24	17	0	7	2	690	400	290	38
3	Easts Tigers	24	16	1	7	2	667	409	258	37
4	Tweed Heads Seagulls	24	15	1	8	2	617	511	106	35
5	Ipswich Jets	24	15	0	9	2	642	514	128	34
6	Papua New Guinea Hunters	24	14	1	9	2	648	557	91	33
7	Burleigh Bears	24	11	1	12	2	549	599	-50	27
8	Norths Devils	24	11	0	13	2	572	544	28	26
9	Mackay Cutters	24	11	0	13	2	472	546	-74	26
10	Souths Logan Magpies	24	10	0	14	2	535	620	-85	24
11	Redcliffe Dolphins	24	8	1	15	2	566	617	-51	21
12	Central Queensland Capras	24	4	1	19	2	415	773	-358	13
13	Sunshine Coast Falcons	24	1	0	23	2	230	776	-546	6

==== Northern Pride (regular season 2014) ====
- Win = 20 (11 of 12 home games, 9 of 12 away games)
- Loss = 4 (1 of 12 home games, 3 of 12 away games)

Round	1	2	3	4	5	6	7	8	9	10	11	12	13	14	15	16	17	18	19	20	21	22	23	24	25	26	27
Result	W	W	W	W	B	W	P	L	W	W	L	W	W	W	W	W	W	W	L	B	W	W	W	W	W	W	L
Ground	H	A	H	A	B	A	P	A	H	H	A	H	H	A	A	A	H	H	H	B	H	A	H	A	A	H	A

Source: https://web.archive.org/web/20120916041305/http://www.qrl.com.au/
A = Away; H = Home; B = Bye; W = Win; D = Draw; L = Loss; P = Postpone

== Finals Series ==
Qualifying / Elimination Finals
2	Wynnum Manly	12
3	Easts	18
4	Tweed Heads	10
5	Ipswich	28

Major / Minor Semi-finals
1	Northern Pride	8
Easts	7
Wynnum Manly	34
Ipswich	22

Preliminary Final
Easts	30
Wynnum Manly	12

Grand Final
Northern Pride	36
Easts	4

Finals Week 2 – Major Semi-Final

Saturday
13 September 2014
17:30 AEST (UTC+10)

Northern Pride	8 – 7	Easts Tigers
Tries: Brett Anderson 1 Goals: Shaun Nona (1 from 1) 1 Field Goal: Penalty Goals: Shaun Nona (1 from 1) 1	Half-time: 6 – 7 Cairns Post Preview; Cairns Post Report; Cairns Post Report; Cairns Post Report	Tries: 1 Shane Neumann; Goals: 1 Liam Tyson (1 from 1); Field Goal: 1 Cody Walker; Penalty Goals:

Barlow Park
(Severin Street, Parramatta Park, QLD)

Sea Swift Northern Pride: 1. Hezron Murgha – FB 2. Javid Bowen* – WG 3. Brett Anderson (c) – CE 4. Davin Crampton – CE 5. Semi Tadulala – WG 6. Shaun Nona – FE 7. Sam Obst – HB 8. Ricky Thorby* – PR 9. Jason Roos (c) – HK 10. Jack Svendsen – PR 11. Blake Leary – SR 12. Tyrone McCarthy – SR 18. Ben Spina – LK
Interchange: 14. Ryan Ghietti, 15. Sheldon Powe-Hobbs, 16. Ethan Lowe*, 17. Joel Riethmuller*.
* = Cowboys allocation.
Unavailable: Alex Starmer (ankle), Ben Jeffries (arm).
Easts Tigers: 1. Cameron Munster, 2. Jarrod McInally, 3. Shane Neumann, 4. Hymel Hunt, 5. Richie Kennar, 6. Liam Tyson, 7. Cody Walker, 8. Steven Thorpe (c), 9. Tommy Butterfield, 10. Mitchell Garbutt, 11. Kenny Bromwich, 12. Troy Giess, 13. Jacob Ling.
Interchange: 14. Liam McDonald, 15. Felise Kaufusi, 16. Donald Malone, 17. Joel Romelo.
Coach: Craig Ingebrigtsen.
- Note: Ben Spina was placed on report for a dangerous throw.
  Sam Obst and Shaun Nona's 50th QCup games.

=== Grand Final ===
Finals Week 4 – Grand Final

Sunday
28 September 2014
15:55 AEST (UTC+10)

Northern Pride	36 – 4	Easts Tigers
Tries: Javid Bowen 2 Brett Anderson 1 Davin Crampton 1 Kyle Feldt 1 Ryan Ghietti 1 Goals: Shaun Nona (6 from 6) 6	1st: 18 – 0; 2nd: 18 – 4 ----- Sin Bin: Ricky Thorby*; Ethan Lowe*; Joel Riethmuller; Kenny Bromwich; Steve Thorpe ----- Courier-Mail Report; Cairns Post Preview; Cairns Post Preview; Cairns Post Preview; Cairns Post Preview; Cairns Post Preview; News Ltd Report; Cairns Post Report; NRL Report; Duncan Hall Man of the Match; Video	Tries: 1 Jarrod McInally Goals: 0 from 1

Suncorp Stadium
(Milton, Brisbane, QLD)
Attendance: 7,135
Referee: Clayton Sharpe.
Player of the Match:
Duncan Hall Man of the Match: Shaun Nona.

Sea Swift Northern Pride: 1. Hezron Murgha – FB 2. Javid Bowen* – WG 3. Brett Anderson (c) – CE 20. Kyle Feldt* – CE 5. Semi Tadulala – WG 6. Shaun Nona – FE 7. Sam Obst – HB 8. Ricky Thorby* – PR 9. Jason Roos (c) – HK 10. Ethan Lowe* – PR 11. Blake Leary – SR 12. Tyrone McCarthy – SR 13. Ben Spina – LK
Interchange: 4. Davin Crampton, 14. Ryan Ghietti 15. Sheldon Powe-Hobbs 16. Joel Riethmuller*.
* = Cowboys allocation
Unavailable: Alex Starmer (ankle).
Easts Tigers: 1. Cameron Munster, 2. Jarrod McInally, 3. Shane Neumann, 4. Donald Malone, 5. Richie Kennar, 6. Liam Tyson, 7. Cody Walker, 8. Steven Thorpe (c), 9. Tom Butterfield, 10. Mitch Garbutt, 11. Dane Hogan, 12. Troy Giess, 13. Jacob Ling.
Interchange: 14. Liam McDonald, 15. Felise Kaufusi, 16. Matthew Zgrajewski, 17. Kenny Bromwich, 18. Hymel Hunt.
Coach: Craig Ingebrigtsen
- Note: Broadcast live on Channel 9 with Matthew Thompson, Scott Sattler and Adrian Vowles as the commentary team.
  Judiciary: Ricky Thorby* sin bin and charged with striking. Ethan Lowe* sin bin and charged with high contact. Joel Riethmuller* charged with dangerous contact. Kenny Bromwich sin bin. Steve Thorpe sin bin.

Northern Pride	Position	Easts Tigers
Hezron Murgha	FB	Cameron Munster
Javid Bowen	WG	Jarrod McInally
Brett Anderson (c)	CE	Shane Neumann
Kyle Feldt	CE	Hymel Hunt
Semi Tadulala	WG	Richie Kennar
Shaun Nona	FE	Liam Tyson
Sam Obst	HB	Cody Walker
Ricky Thorby	PR	Felise Kaufusi
Jason Roos (c)	HK	Tom Butterfield
Ethan Lowe	PR	Matthew Zgrajewski
Blake Leary	SR	Dane Hogan
Tyrone McCarthy	SR	Troy Giess
Ben Spina	LK	Kenny Bromwich
Davin Crampton	Bench	Donald Malone
Ryan Ghietti	Bench	Steven Thorpe (c)
Sheldon Powe-Hobbs	Bench	Mitch Garbutt
Joel Riethmuller	Bench	Liam McDonald
Jason Demetriou	Coach	Craig Ingebrigtsen

The Northern Pride dominated the regular season, winning 16 games as they won their second consecutive minor premiership. They defeated Easts 8–7 in the major semi final to qualify for their third Grand Final. Easts, who finished third, defeated Wynnum Manly in the first week of the finals before their one-point loss to the Pride. A week later, they again faced Wynnum Manly, winning 30–12 to qualify for their second consecutive Grand Final and their fourth overall.

==== First half ====
The Northern Pride opened the scoring in the 15th minute when centre Kyle Feldt crossed after a set play to the right. They added another try five minutes later when Hezron Murgha sent Javid Bowen over with a short ball. They went into the half time break with an 18–0 lead after Davin Crampton scored next to the posts in the 35th minute.

==== Second half ====
The Pride started the second half as they ended the first, when Shaun Nona caught his own rebounded kick and found his captain Brett Anderson, who scored in the corner. The lead jumped to 30 in the 51st minute when Ryan Ghietti scored thanks to a Blake Leary line break. After 65 minutes, the Tigers finally got on the scoreboard after winger Jarrod McInally scored a consolation try. The Pride wrapped up the win with their sixth try of the game, after Bowen crossed out wide for his second in the 79th minute. Shaun Nona converted to bring the final score to 36–4, the biggest winning margin in a Queensland Cup Grand Final (as of 2019). Nona was awarded the Duncan Hall Medal for man of the match.

North Queensland Cowboys-contracted Pride players Kyle Feldt and Ethan Lowe would go onto to play in the Cowboys' 2015 NRL Grand Final win over the Brisbane Broncos, while Pride head coach Jason Demetriou joined the Cowboys as an assistant coach in 2015 and was on the coaching staff for the Grand Final win.

== NRL State Championship ==
2014 NRL State Championship
Penrith Panthers	Northern Pride
28	32
1	2	Total
16	12	28
16	16	32
- Date: 5 October 2014
- Stadium: ANZ Stadium
- Location: Sydney

Broadcast partners
- Broadcasters: Nine Network

Penrith Panthers (NSW) v Northern Pride (QLD).

Penrith were minor premiers in the New South Wales Cup, with only four losses out of 21 games this season. They won all their matches in the finals series, defeating the Newcastle Knights 48–12 in the Grand Final.

The Pride were minor premiers in the Queensland Cup, with only four losses games out of 24 this season. They also won all their matches in the finals series, beating Easts Tigers 36–4 in the Grand Final.

Former Brisbane Broncos and Queensland State of Origin player Justin Hodges had endorsed the Northern Pride in a Cairns Post article before the match, stating, "They may be a Cowboys feeder team but everyone knows they are a Cairns team and a Queensland team. They are a strong side and are a classy side that is coached very well. They have been the benchmark of the Queensland competition for years so I know they'll go well. There is only them and the Broncos U-20s from up here playing on grand final day. So I reckon everyone in Queensland will be cheering them on."

Inaugural NRL State Championship

Sunday
5 October 2014
14:55 AEST (UTC+10)
15:55 AEDT (UTC+11)

Northern Pride,	32 – 28	Penrith Panthers,
Tries: Blake Leary 1 Javid Bowen* 3 Semi Tadulala 1 Tyrone McCarthy 1 Goals: Nona (1 from 3) 1 Javid Bowen* (2 from 3) 2 Penalty Goal: Shaun Nona (1 from 1) 1	Half-time: 16 – 16; Cairn Post Preview; Cairns Post Preview; Courier Mail Preview; Courier Mail Preview; Courier Mail Preview; Courier Mail Preview; NRL Preview; Panthers Report; QRL Report; Cairns Post Report; QRL Video; NZAUTV Video; RugbyLeague TV	Tries: 1 Luke Capewell; 1 Eto Nabuli; 1 Waqa Blake; 1 Kierran Moseley; 1 Kieren Moss; Goals: 4 Wes Naiqama (4 from 5); Penalty Goal: 0

ANZ Stadium
(Sydney Olympic Park, Sydney NSW)
Referee: Adam Cassidy
Touch Judges: Liam Nichols and Clayton Sharpe
Video Referees: Steve Chiddy and Henry Perenara
Player of the Match: Javid Bowen*

Sea Swift Northern Pride: 1. Hezron Murgha – FB 2. Javid Bowen* – WG 3. Brett Anderson (c) – CE 4. Davin Crampton – CE 5. Semi Tadulala – WG 6. Shaun Nona – FE 7. Sam Obst – HB 8. Ricky Thorby* – PR 9. Jason Roos (c) – HK 10. Ethan Lowe* – PR 11. Blake Leary – SR 12. Tyrone McCarthy – SR 13. Ben Spina – LK
Interchange: 14. Ryan Ghietti, 15. Sheldon Powe-Hobbs, 17. Jack Svendsen, 18. Tom Hancock, 21. Patrick Kaufusi*. (One to be omitted).
* = Cowboys allocation
Unavailable: Alex Starmer (ankle), Justin Castellaro (leg), Joel Riethmuller* (suspension), Kyle Feldt* (personal reasons).
Penrith Panthers: 1. Kieren Moss, 2. Eto Nabuli, 3. Waqa Blake, 4. Kevin Naiqama, 5. Wes Naiqama, 6. Luke Capewell, 7. Tom Humble, 8. Sam Anderson, 9. Kevin Kingston (c), 10. Reagan Campbell-Gillard, 11. Ben Murdoch-Masila, 12. Nathan Smith, 13. Ryan Simpkins.
Interchange: 14. Vaipuna Tia Kilifi, 15. Kierran Moseley, 16. Leilani Latu, 17. Andy Saunders.
Coach: Garth Brennan
Note: This match was played as the curtain raiser to the NRL grand final.
Broadcast live on Channel 9 with Matthew Thompson, Scott Sattler and Adrian Vowles as the commentary team.

== 2014 Northern Pride players ==
Pride player	Appearances	Tries	Goals	Field goals	Pts
Alex Starmer	19	0	0	0	0
Ben Jeffries	1	0	0	0	0
Ben Spina	22	6	0	0	24
Blake Leary	25	12	0	0	48
Brent Oosen	2	0	0	0	0
Brett Anderson	21	8	0	0	32
Davin Crampton	26	17	0	0	68
Hezron Murgha	17	4	0	0	16
Jack Svendsen	19	3	0	0	12
Jared Allen	1	0	0	0	0
Jason Roos	26	0	0	0	0
Jordon Biondi-Odo	3	0	0	0	0
Justin Castellaro	11	7	0	0	28
Latu Fifita	12	1	0	0	4
Linc Port	4	1	0	0	4
Menmuny Murgha	2	0	0	0	0
PJ Webb	1	0	0	0	0
Ryan Ghietti	18	1	0	0	4
Sam Obst	27	4	0	1	17
Semi Tadulala	21	2	0	0	8
Shaun Nona	24	7	89	0	206
Sheldon Powe-Hobbs	23	2	0	0	8
Tom Hancock	9	0	0	0	0
Tyrone McCarthy	27	9	0	0	36

=== North Queensland Cowboys who played for the Pride in 2013 ===
Cowboys player	Appearances	Tries	Goals	Field goals	Pts
Cameron King*	6	4	0	0	16
Ethan Lowe*	14	2	0	0	8
Javid Bowen*	22	12	0	0	48
Joel Riethmuller*	12	1	0	0	4
Kyle Feldt*	16	12	14	0	76
Matthew Wright*	3	0	0	0	0
Patrick Kaufusi*	2	0	0	0	0
Ricky Thorby*	20	2	0	0	8
Robert Lui*	3	2	0	0	8

== 2014 Televised Games ==
=== Channel Nine ===
In August 2012 as part of the historic $1 billion five-year broadcasting agreement with Nine and Fox Sports, the Australian Rugby League Commission confirmed that Intrust Super Cup matches would be televised by Channel 9 until 2018. One match a week was shown live across Queensland at 2.00pm (AEST) on Sunday afternoons on Channel 9 (or GEM), on WIN Television (RTQ) in regional areas and on Imparja Television in remote areas. The match was also broadcast in Papua New Guinea on Kundu 2 TV. The 2014 commentary team was Peter Psaltis, Scott Sattler and Mathew Thompson.

In 2014 the Pride appeared in five televised games

- Round 11: Northern Pride lost to Tweed Heads Seagulls 26-29 at Piggabeen Sports Complex, Tweed Heads West.
- Round 16: Northern Pride beat Easts Tigers 44-20 at Langlands Park, Stones Corner, Brisbane.
- Round 18: Northern Pride beat SP PNG Hunters 36-18 at Barlow Park, Cairns.
- Round 22: Northern Pride beat Tweed Heads Seagulls 22-18 (played at 12.30 pm and delayed telecast at 2.00 pm) from Barlow Park, Cairns.
- Grand Final: Northern Pride beat Easts Tigers at Suncorp Stadium, Brisbane.

The inaugural NRL State Championship was shown nationally on the Nine Network with Matthew Thompson, Scott Sattler and Adrian Vowles as the commentary team. The game was immediately followed by the NRL Telstra Premiership grand final between Souths and the Bulldogs. commentary team.

- 1: Northern Pride won the inaugural NRL State Championship 32-28: Sunday, 5 October 2014 against Penrith Panthers 2.30 pm from ANZ Stadium, Sydney.

=== Live Streaming ===
From Round 1 2012 the Pride began live streaming their home games free to members via their website ($5 for non-members). From Round 5 2012 away games were streamed through the website as well (Free to members, $5 to non-members). In 2013, all matches (including pre-season trials but excluding matches broadcast live by Channel Nine) were streamed live through the Pride website, with access granted exclusively to Pride members. Video production was by Studio Productions and the commentary team was Adam Jackson and Northern Pride Under-18s coach, Cameron 'Spiller' Miller.
