= David Fifita =

David Fifita may refer to:

- David Fifita (rugby league, born 1989)
- David Fifita (rugby league, born 2000)
