= Sam Obst =

Australian rugby league footballer

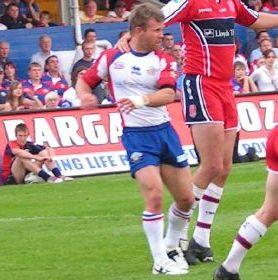

Personal information
- Full name: Sam Obst
- Born: 26 November 1980 (age 45) Australia
- Height: 170 cm (5 ft 7 in)
- Weight: 79 kg (12 st 6 lb)

Playing information
- Position: Hooker, Stand-off, Scrum-half
Club
Years	Team	Pld	T	G	FG	P
2001–02	Sydney Roosters	7	0	0	0	0
2004	Whitehaven	25	18	0	4	80
2005–11	Wakefield Trinity Wildcats	137	59	7	0	250
2011	Hull F.C.	25	9	0	0	36
2012	Keighley Cougars	24	10	0	1	41
	Total	218	96	7	5	407
- Source: As of 1 November 2023

Sam Obst (born 26 November 1980) is a former professional rugby league footballer who last played for Australian Queensland Cup club Northern Pride. Obst was equally at home playing at scrum-half and at hooker. Obst originated from the rugby league stronghold of Redcliffe and attended Southern Cross Catholic College.

== Whitehaven ==
Obst joined Whitehaven in 2004 and was voted National League One Player of the Year for 2004. He went on to join Wakefield Trinity Wildcats.

== Wakefield Trinity Wildcats ==
The Australian had an excellent season with the Wakefield club, especially during the latter half of 2006 under John Kear. He later re-signed with Wakefield Trinity Wildcats for another two years to keep him as a player there till 2009. He later signed a new two-year deal by head coach John Kear, and has accepted, keeping him at the club until 2011. In 2008 and 2009, Obst received the club's man of steel (best player for club).

== Hull F.C. ==
In 2011, Obst signed a two-year deal with Super League club Hull F.C. The deal is completed for an undisclosed fee as part of the rescue plan for Wakefield Trinity Wildcats.

== Keighley Cougars ==
On 1 December 2011 it was announced that Obst had signed a 12-month deal with Co-operative Championship club Keighley Cougars. Obst followed in his father's (Tony Obst played for Keighley in the 1970s) footsteps and re-joined two of his former teammates in Michael Korkidas and cougars player-coach Jason Demetriou.

== Northern Pride ==
In 2013 Obst played for the Cairns based Intrust Super Cup team, the Northern Pride. In 2014, Obst was part of Northern Pride's Queensland Cup winning side. Obst played in the inaugural NRL State Championship final for the Northern Pride as they defeated Penrith 32–28. He played with the club up until the end of the 2015 season. In 2017 he returned to the Pride as assistant coach, a role he still holds (2024).
