= Blake Leary =

Australian rugby league footballer

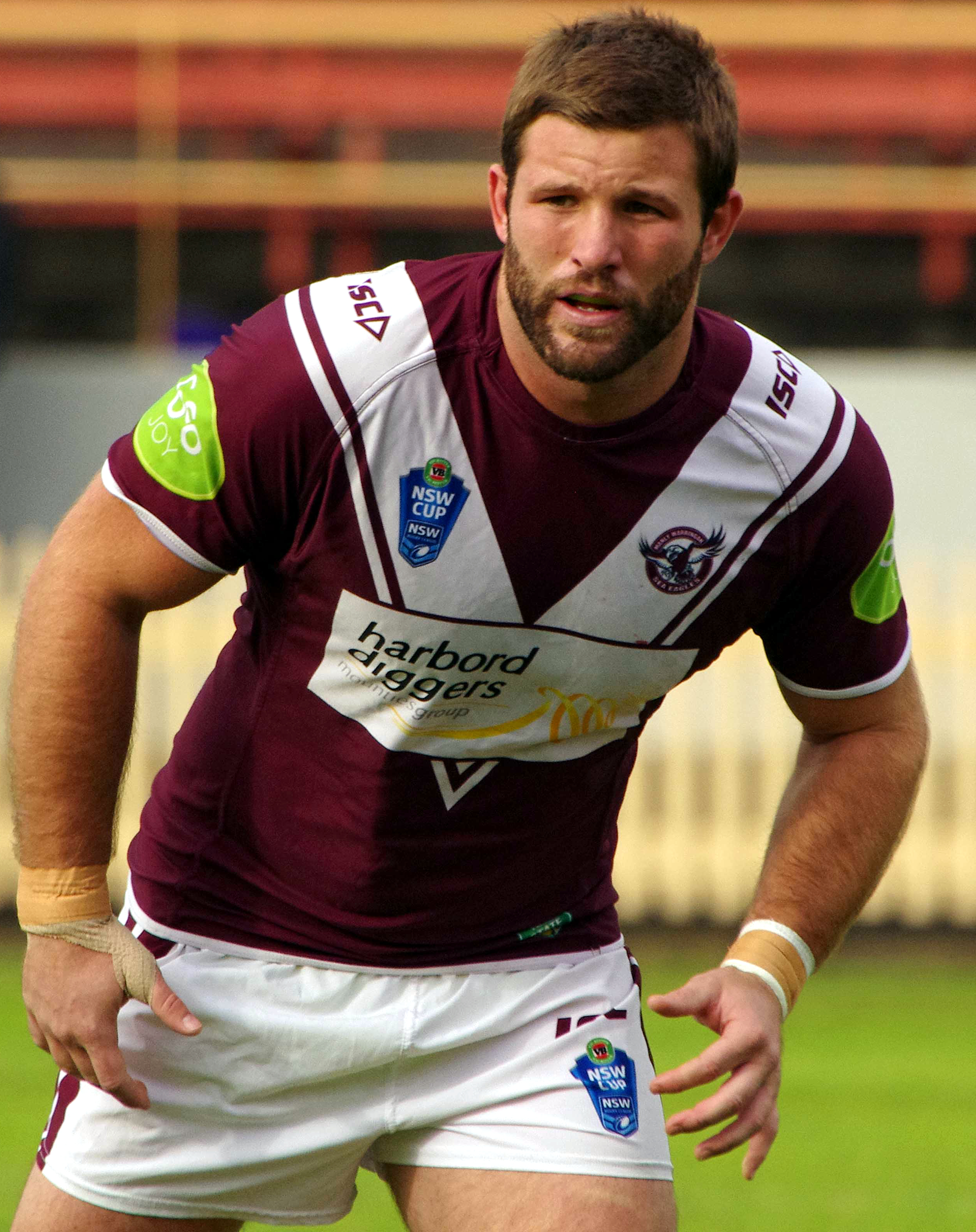

Personal information
- Born: 4 December 1990 (age 34); Mona Vale, New South Wales, Australia
- Height: 180 cm (5 ft 11 in)
- Weight: 97 kg (15 st 4 lb)

Playing information
- Position: Lock, Second-row, Hooker
Club
Years	Team	Pld	T	G	FG	P
2012–14	North Qld Cowboys	2	0	0	0	0
2015–16	Manly Sea Eagles	27	1	0	0	4
2017	North Qld Cowboys	3	0	0	0	0
2019–21	Lézignan Sangliers	7	2	0	0	8
2021	New York Freedom	0	0	0	0	0
	Total	39	3	0	0	12
Representative
Years	Team	Pld	T	G	FG	P
2014–18	Queensland Residents	3	1	0	0	4
- Source: As of 6 January 2024

Blake Leary (born 4 December 1990) is an Australian professional rugby league footballer who plays as a lock, second-row forward and hooker for the New York Freedom in the North American Rugby League.

He previously played for Manly-Warringah and the North Queensland Cowboys over two separate spells in the NRL. He also played for the Lézignan Sangliers in the Elite One Championship.

== Background ==
Lear was born in Mona Vale, New South Wales, Australia and moved to the Gold Coast, Queensland at the age of one.

He played his junior football for the Nerang Roosters and attended Keebra Park State High School, before being signed by the Melbourne Storm in 2009. As a youngster, Leary played for the Queensland Under 18s team.

== Playing career ==
In 2009 and 2010, Leary played for the Melbourne Storm's NYC team, scoring 17 tries, 5 goals and 1 field goal in 26 games. He captained the team in 2010.

In 2011, Leary joined the North Queensland Cowboys, playing for their Queensland Cup team, Northern Pride RLFC. Shortly after being suspended in 2011, Leary injured his knee, requiring a knee reconstruction and missed the rest of the season. In 2012, he recovered from his knee reconstruction to train with the Cowboys first-grade squad.

In round 25 of the 2012 NRL season, Leary made his NRL debut for North Queensland against the Newcastle Knights.

At the beginning of 2014, Leary was released by the North Queensland outfit. In July 2014, Leary played for the Queensland Residents team. At the end of the season the forward started in the second row for the Pride's Queensland Cup & NRL State Championship titles. On 1 October 2014, Leary signed a two-year contract with the Manly Warringah Sea Eagles starting in 2015.

On 14 November 2016, Leary returned to North Queensland, signing with the Townsville Blackhawks after two seasons with Manly. Over the 2017 pre-season, Leary trained with his former club, the North Queensland Cowboys. He scored a try in North Queensland's 11-10 trial win over the Sydney Roosters but did not earn an NRL contract with the club.

In round 6 of the 2017 NRL season, Leary was recalled by North Queensland side, coming off the bench against the Wests Tigers. He would play three games for the Townsville based club in 2017, starting at hooker in two of those games. In 2018, Leary returned to the Gold Coast, joining the Burleigh Bears in the Intrust Super Cup in Queensland, the Burleigh club took the title in 2019.

=== NY Freedom ===
On 23 May 2021, it was announced on the NY Freedom Instagram social media account that Leary had signed for the New York Freedom to play in their inaugural 2021 season in the North American Rugby League.

== Statistics ==
=== NRL ===
Season	Team	Matches	T	G	GK %	F/G	Pts
2012	North Queensland Cowboys	1	0	0	–	0	0
2013	North Queensland Cowboys	1	0	0	–	0	0
2015	Manly Warringah Sea Eagles	13	1	0	–	0	4
2016	Manly Warringah Sea Eagles	14	0	0	–	0	0
2017	North Queensland Cowboys	3	0	0	–	0	0
Career totals		32	1	0	—	0	4
