= Steve Thorpe =

Australian rugby league footballer (born 1989)

Personal information
- Full name: Steven Thorpe
- Born: 26 September 1989 (age 37) Australia
- Height: 6 ft 3 in (1.91 m)
- Weight: 16 st 9 lb (106 kg)

Playing information
- Position: Prop
Club
Years	Team	Pld	T	G	FG	P
2015–16	Sheffield Eagles	54	6	0	0	24
- Source: As of 6 October 2016

Steve Thorpe (born 26 September 1989) is an Australian professional rugby league footballer who plays for the Easts Tigers in the Intrust Super Cup. He plays as a prop.

== Background ==
Thorpe was born in Australia.

== Career ==
Thorpe has previously played for the Sheffield Eagles in the Kingstone Press Championship. He was Sheffield’s captain. Thorpe was the Eagles player of the year in 2015. He suffered a broken leg against the Widnes Vikings, ending his 2015 season.

He has also played for the Queensland Rugby League competition. Thorpe was the captain of the Easts Tigers. Prior to his return to Australia Thorpe played 106 games for Easts, including the 2013 and 2014 Intrust Super Cup Grand Finals.
