= David Fifita (rugby league, born 1989) =

Tonga international rugby league footballer

Dave Fifita
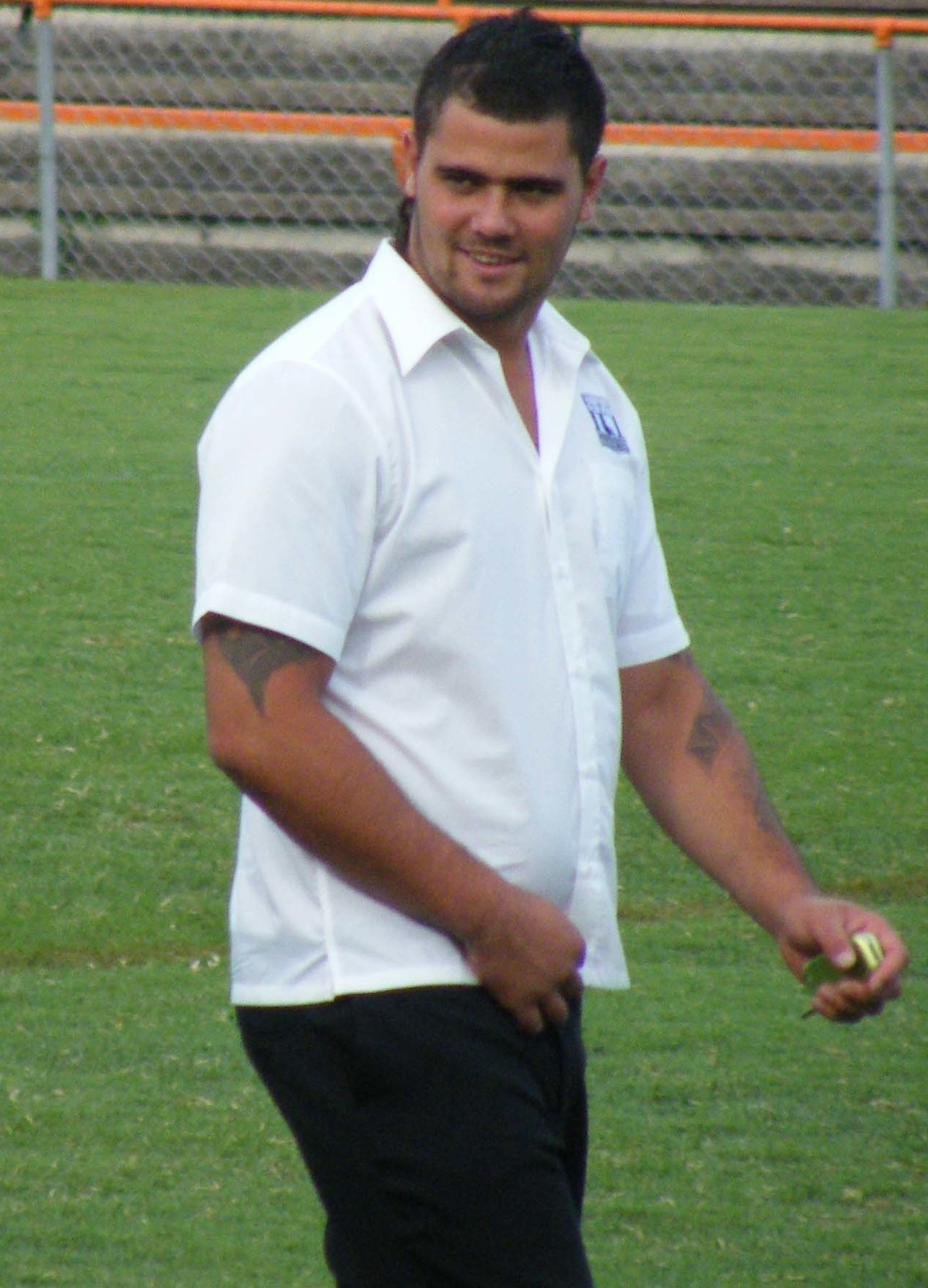

Personal information
- Full name: David Fifita
- Born: 28 June 1989 (age 37) Blacktown, New South Wales, Australia
- Height: 6 ft 4 in (1.94 m)
- Weight: 18 st 13 lb (120 kg)

Playing information
- Position: Prop
Club
Years	Team	Pld	T	G	FG	P
2012–13	Lézignan Sangliers
2014–16	Cronulla Sharks	19	0	0	0	0
2016–22	Wakefield Trinity	141	28	3	0	116
2017(loan)	→ Dewsbury Rams	1	0	0	0	0
2022–2022	→ Crigglestone AllBlacks	1	0	0	0	0
2023	Wakefield Trinity	12	0	0	0	0
	Total	174	28	3	0	116
Representative
Years	Team	Pld	T	G	FG	P
2015–16	Tonga	3	0	0	0	0
2015	Indigenous All Stars	1	0	0	0	0
2022	Combined Nations All Stars	1	0	0	0	0
- Source: As of 30 May 2023
- Education: Blacktown Boys High School; Patrician Brothers' College, Blacktown
- Relatives: Latu Fifita (brother); Andrew Fifita (brother); David Fifita (cousin); Solomon Haumono (uncle)

David Fifita (Tongan: Tēvita Fifita) (born 28 June 1989) is a Tonga international rugby league footballer who plays as a prop for The Entrance Tigers in the Central Coast League in NSW, Australia.

He previously played for the Lezignan Sangliers in the Elite One Championship and the Cronulla-Sutherland Sharks in the NRL. He has spent time on loan from Wakefield at the Dewsbury Rams in the Championship.

== Background ==
He was born in Blacktown, New South Wales, Australia.

He attended Patrician Brothers' College, Blacktown and Blacktown Boys High School.

Fifita is of Indigenous Australian and Tongan descent and played his junior rugby league for St Patricks Blacktown and Doonside Roos, before being signed by the Wests Tigers.

Fifita is the twin brother of fellow Cronulla-Sutherland Sharks player Andrew Fifita, and cousin of Gold Coast Titans player David Fifita He is not related to John Fifita, a former St George Dragons player. Fifita's elder brother Latu Fifita plays for Workington Town in the Kingstone Press Championship.

== Playing career ==
=== Early career ===
In 2009, Fifita played for the Wests Tigers' NYC team In 2010, he played for Tonga alongside his brother. In 2011, he moved on to the Tigers' New South Wales Cup teams, Balmain Ryde-Eastwood Tigers and Western Suburbs Magpies. At the end of 2012, he joined the Lézignan Sangliers in the Elite One Championship.

In June 2013, after finishing his season with Lézignan, he attracted the interest of NRL clubs, Cronulla-Sutherland Sharks and Melbourne Storm.

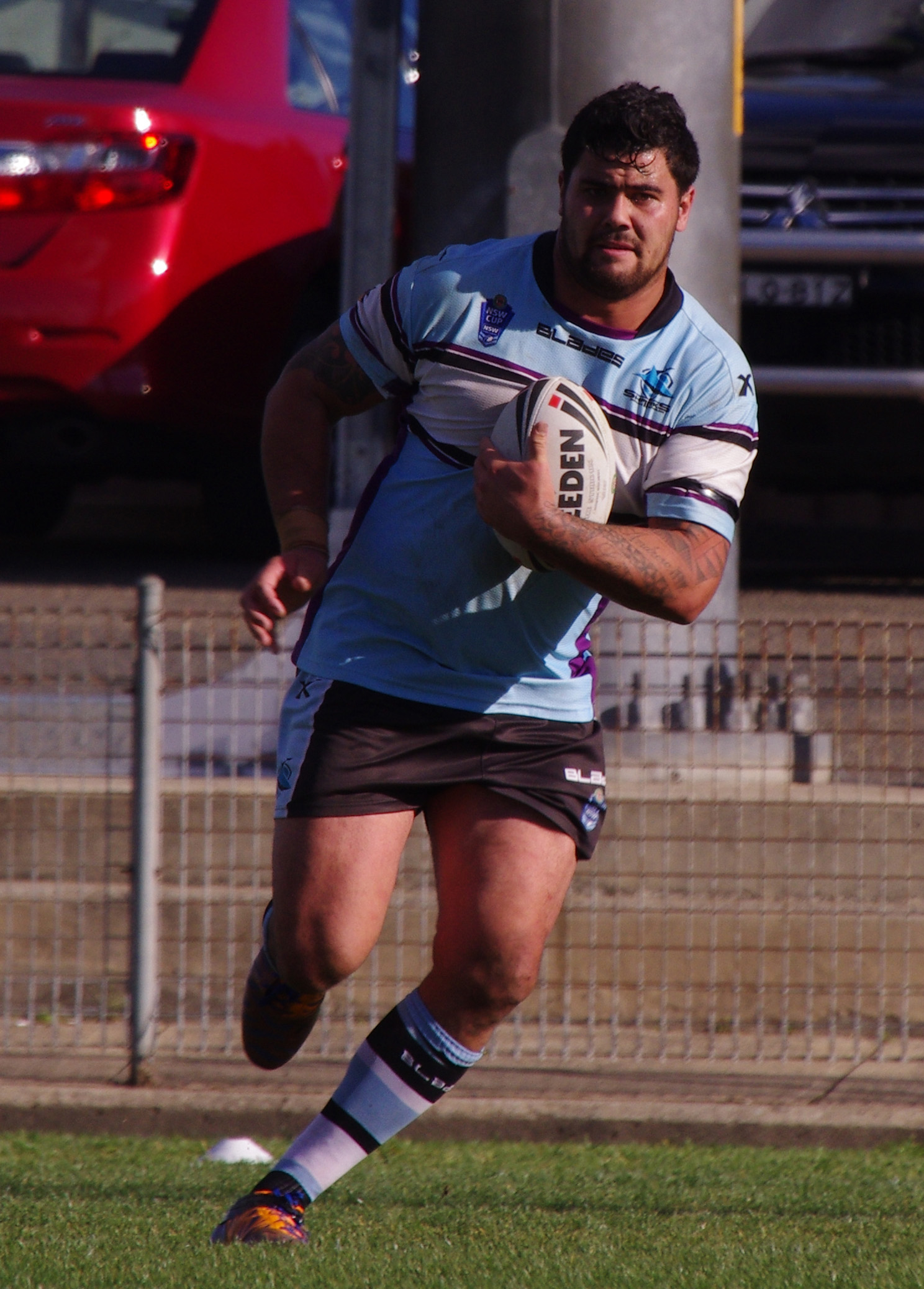
Fifita playing for the Sharks in 2013

He eventually signed a contract with the Sharks for the rest of the 2013 NRL season, the club where his twin brother Andrew played. After playing 6 games for the Sharks in the NSW Cup, he re-signed with them for 2014.

Fifita was a member of the 2013 NSW Cup premiership side which defeated Windsor Wolves 38-6 in the grand final.

=== 2014 ===
In Round 2 of the 2014 NRL season, Fifita made his NRL début for Cronulla-Sutherland against the Canterbury-Bankstown Bulldogs. On 17 July 2014, he re-signed with Cronulla-Sutherland on a two-year contract.

=== 2015 ===
On 13 February 2015, Fifita played for the Indigenous All Stars against the NRL All Stars in the 2015 All Stars match. In October, Fifita was selected in Tonga's 48-man train-on squad for the Asia-Pacific Qualifier for the 2017 Rugby League World Cup. He would go on to make the final 18-man squad where he would be named the 18th man and would fill in for any late injuries, suspensions or tactical changes. He would go on to play in that match, in what was only his second appearance for Tonga, after filling in for Leilani Latu.

=== 2016 ===
On 7 May, Fifita played for Tonga against Samoa in the 2016 Polynesian Cup. On 10 June, after gaining a release from Cronulla-Sutherland, he joined Wakefield Trinity in the Super League on a one-year contract, with an option for a second year, effective immediately. Fifita turned into a big fans favourite at Wakefield Trinity due to his physical dominance in the middle of the park.

=== 2017 ===
Fifita made 21 appearances for Wakefield Trinity in the 2017 Super League season where the club shocked many by finishing fifth on the table.

=== 2018 ===
In the 2018 Super League season, Fifita made 17 appearances for Wakefield as the club finished 7th on the table.

=== 2019 ===
Fifita played 22 games for Wakefield in the 2019 Super League season where the club finished ninth on the table.

=== 2020 ===
On 28 August, Fifita was stood down by Wakefield after he refused to wear a GPS tracking device for coronavirus protocols. Fifita played only nine games for Wakefield in the 2020 Super League season as the club finished second bottom.

=== 2021 ===
Fifita played 25 games for Wakefield Trinity in the 2021 Super League season which saw the club finish in 10th place.

=== 2022 ===
In round 18 of the 2022 Super League season, Fifita scored a try and was later sent to the sin bin during Wakefield's 38-26 loss against Toulouse Olympique at Magic Weekend. After seven seasons at Wakefield Trinity, Fifita announced that he would be departing the club at the end of the year. Fifita's final game for Wakefield was a 16-14 loss against Huddersfield.

After leaving Wakefield he joined The Entrance Tigers in the Central Coast Division Rugby League.

=== 2023 ===
In May, it was announced that Fifita would come out of semi-retirement to play for Wakefield Trinity after the club had lost its opening 13 matches. Fifita made his return in the clubs Magic Weekend loss against Leigh in round 14. In round 15, Fifita played in Wakefield's 24-14 upset victory over Leeds to end a 14-game losing streak. Fifita played a total of 12 matches for Wakefield Trinity in the Super League XXVIII season as the club finished bottom of the table and were relegated to the RFL Championship which ended their 24-year stay in the top flight.
