= Ricky Thorby =

New Zealand rugby league footballer

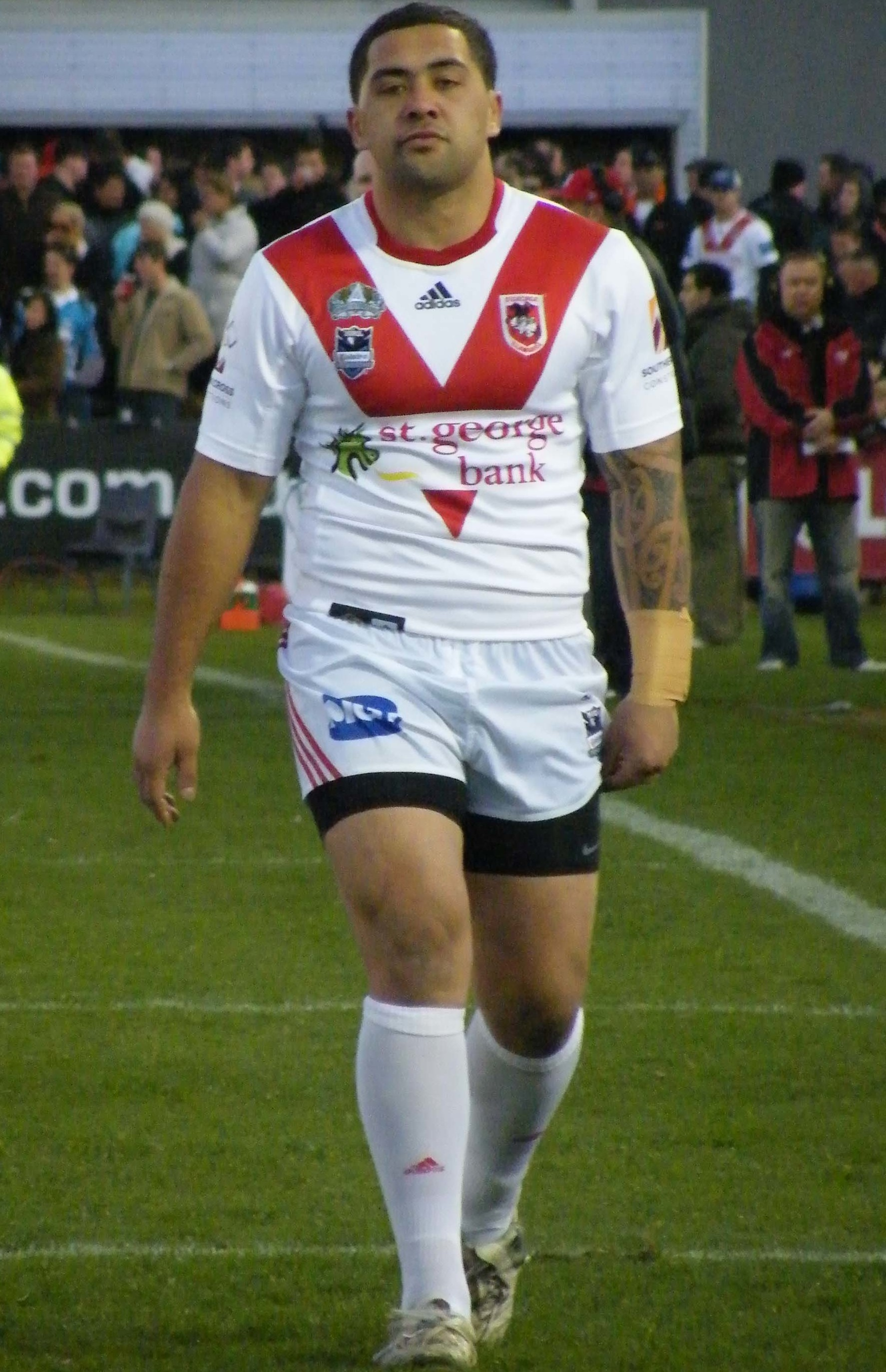

Personal information
- Full name: Ricky Thorby
- Born: 2 October 1985 (age 39); Palmerston North, New Zealand

Playing information
- Height: 181 cm (5 ft 11 in)
- Weight: 101 kg (15 st 13 lb)
- Position: Prop, Second-row
Club
Years	Team	Pld	T	G	FG	P
2007–10	St. George Illawarra	21	0	0	0	0
2011–14	North Qld Cowboys	24	0	0	0	0
	Total	45	0	0	0	0

Ricky Thorby (born 2 October 1985) is a New Zealand former professional rugby league footballer who last played for the North Queensland Cowboys in the National Rugby League. He previously played for the St. George Illawarra Dragons.

His positions of choice were as a second-row or as a Prop.

== Background ==
Thorby was born in New Zealand.

== Playing career ==
His junior club was the Foxton Rebels and he later played for the Central Falcons in the Bartercard Cup. He also played for the Innisfail Leprechauns in the C.D.R.L.

Thorby made his first grade debut for St George against Brisbane in round 12 2007. Thorby mainly played for St George Illawarra's feeder club (the Shellharbour Dragons) as a Prop.

After playing over 20 games for St George over four seasons, Thorby signed a two-year contract with the North Queensland Cowboys in order to receive more game time.

Thorby was named in North Queensland's round 2 and 6 sides in 2011 but was ruled out of both clashes due to injury, which happened to be an injury effected first season in the prop's first season with the Townsville club. Thorby was only available for the club for only half the season in 2011, playing well for feeder club Northern Pride after injuries plagued his season.

In 2012 Thorby was a stand-out in North Queensland's pre-season and trials and was rewarded with an 18th man spot in the club's round 4 clash against the Cronulla-Sutherland Sharks.

Thorby made his first appearance for North Queensland's round 5 game against the Canberra Raiders, he replaced Co-Captain Matthew Scott and ran for an impressive 94 metres off the bench.

In round 8 2012, Thorby was rewarded with player of the match award with The anzac teddy for his strong carries. In this game Thorby made 119 metres from just 10 runs.

Thorby had been one of the most improved players in the 2012 NRL season and had been described a human bowling ball. In his side's round 10 away victory over Newcastle he suffered rib cartlidge damage during his first hit-up of the game, he bravely toughed the game out, playing on for 26 minutes after the injury occurred.

Thorby came off contract with North Queensland at the end of the 2012 NRL season but was resigned until the end of 2014. Thorby's final match in first grade was a 42-12 loss against Canberra in round 11 2014.

In 2016 Thorby joined the Norths Devils A grade team for the TDRL season.

== Personal life ==
Thorby is married to Kirrily Hardy and the pair have two young children together.

After coming off contract with the NRL Thorby had plans to retire and join the Police force but those plans were halted by previous driving indiscretions.
