= Latu Fifita =

Tonga international rugby league footballer

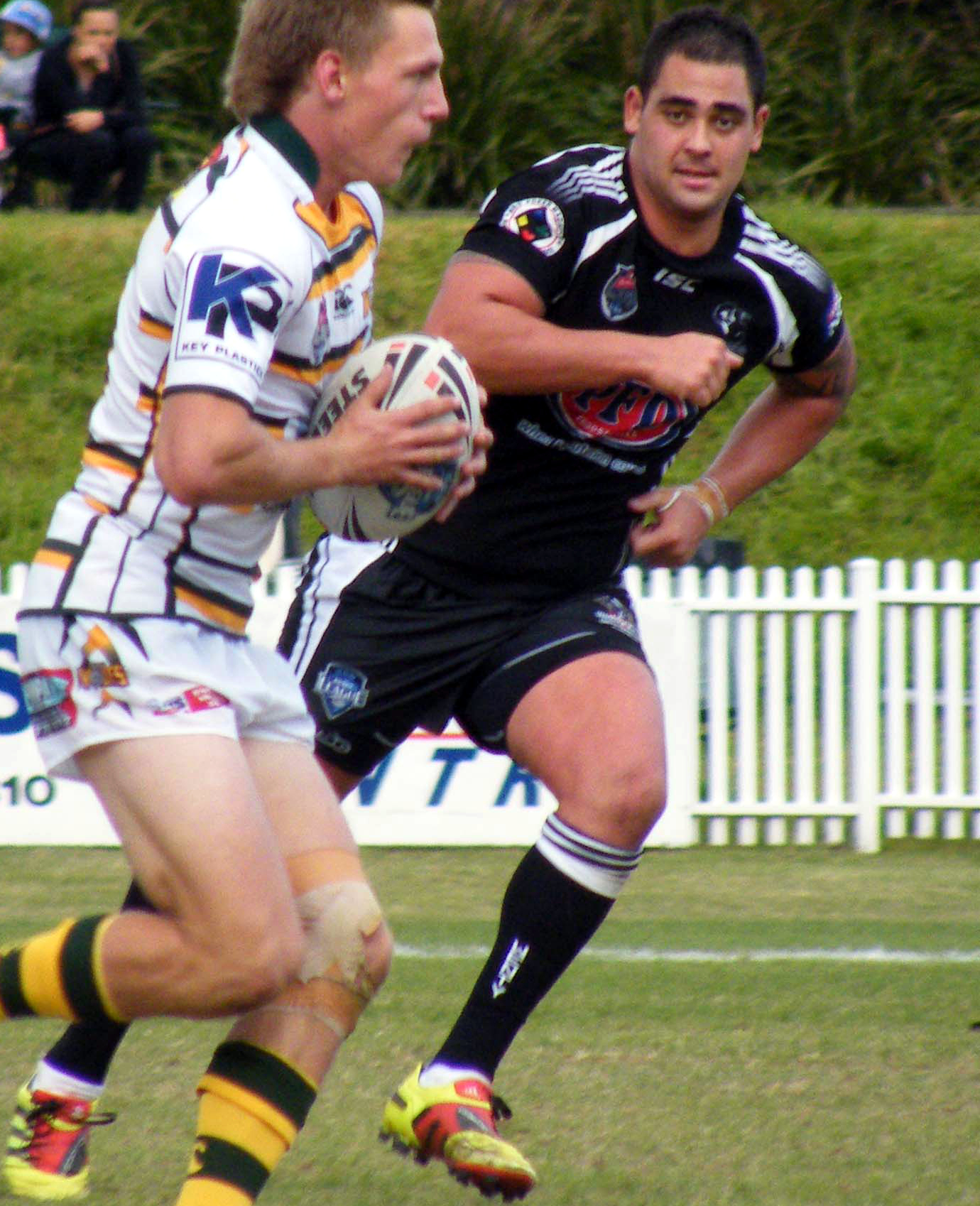

Personal information
- Full name: Latu Fifita
- Born: 29 October 1987 (age 39)
- Height: 1.90 m (6 ft 3 in)
- Weight: 120 kg (18 st 13 lb)

Playing information
- Position: Prop
Club
Years	Team	Pld	T	G	FG	P
2015–16	Workington Town	11	1	0	0	4
Representative
Years	Team	Pld	T	G	FG	P
	Tonga
- Source: As of 26 January 2021
- Relatives: Andrew Fifita (brother); David Fifita (brother); David Fifita (cousin); Solomon Haumono (uncle)

Latu Fifita (born 29 October 1987) is a professional rugby league footballer of Indigenous Australian and Tongan descent who most recently played professionally for Workington Town in the Kingstone Press Championship. He plays as a prop and can also play as a loose-forward.

Fifita is a Tongan international. He is a Balmain Tigers junior and has previously played for the North Sydney Bears and the Northern Pride.

Latu Fifita is the elder brother of twins Andrew Fifita and David Fifita.
