= David Fifita (rugby league, born 2000) =

Professional rugby league footballer

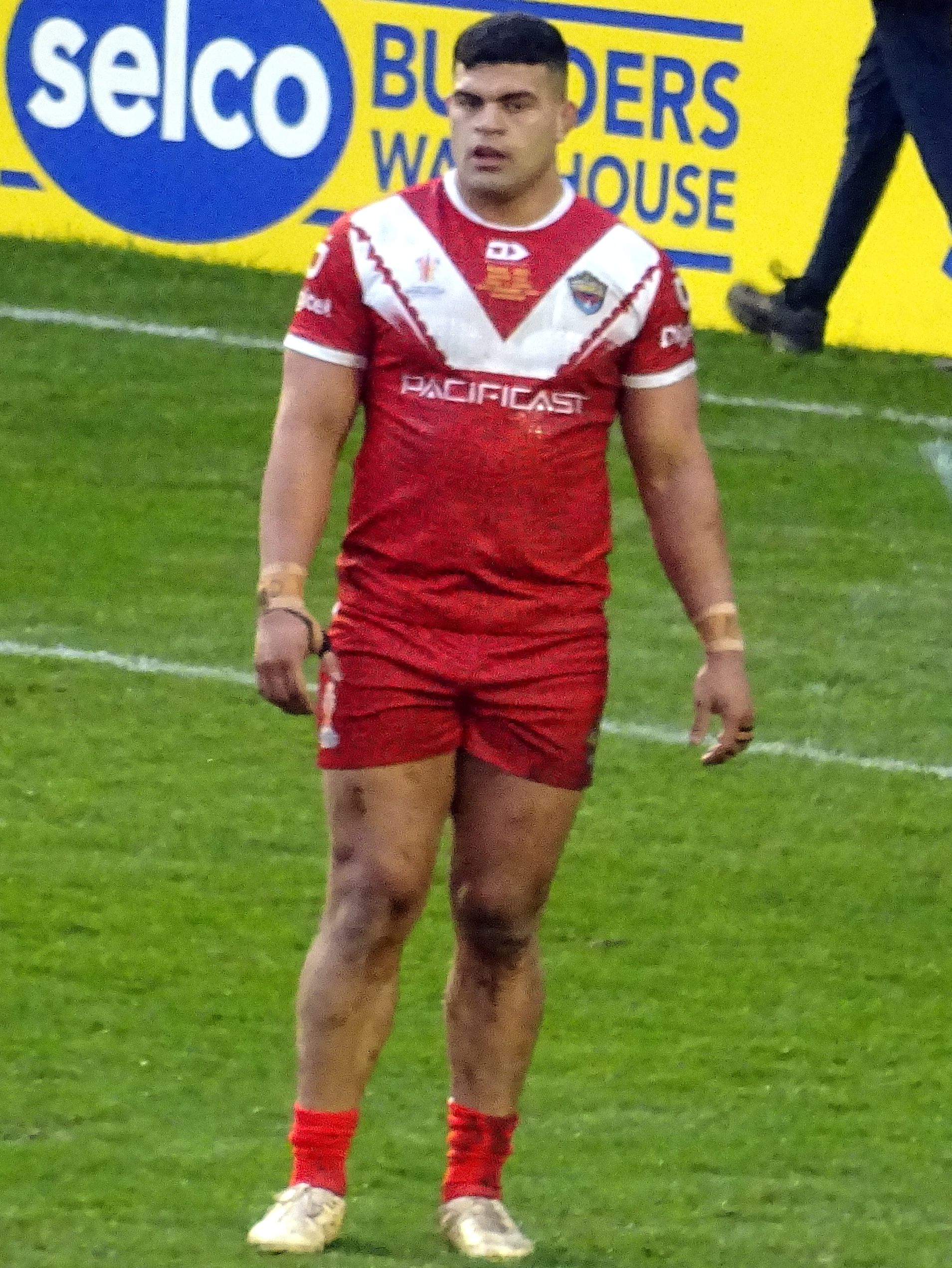

Personal information
- Full name: David Fifita Jnr
- Born: 25 February 2000 (age 26) Brisbane, Queensland, Australia
- Height: 186 cm (6 ft 1 in)
- Weight: 115 kg (18 st 2 lb)

Playing information
- Position: Second-row
Club
Years	Team	Pld	T	G	FG	P
2018–20	Brisbane Broncos	44	13	0	0	52
2021–25	Gold Coast Titans	90	37	0	0	148
2026–	South Sydney	17	6	0	0	24
	Total	151	56	0	0	224
Representative
Years	Team	Pld	T	G	FG	P
2019–22	Indigenous All Stars	4	1	0	0	4
2019–23	Queensland	8	1	0	0	4
2019–26	Prime Minister's XIII	2	1	0	0	4
2019	Australia 9s	4	2	0	0	8
2022	Tonga	4	1	0	0	4
2026–	Australia	1	0	0	0	0
- Source: As of 18 November 2026
- Education: Keebra Park State High School
- Relatives: Tesi Niu (cousin); Latu Fifita (cousin); Andrew Fifita (cousin); David Fifita (cousin); Solomon Haumono (uncle)

David Tuiono Fifita (born 25 February 2000) is a professional rugby league footballer who plays as a second-rower for the South Sydney Rabbitohs in the NRL. He has played for both Tonga and Australia at international level.

He previously played for the Brisbane Broncos and the Gold Coast Titans in the National Rugby League and has played for the Indigenous All Stars, Queensland and the Prime Minister's XIII at representative level.

== Early life ==
Fifita was born in Brisbane, Queensland, Australia, and is of Torres Strait Islander (Badu) descent on his mother's side and Tongan descent on his father's side.

Fifita was educated at Keebra Park State High School and his playing style had been compared to former Bronco Ben Te'o. NRL commentator Andrew Voss rated Fifita as the best young schoolboy forward he has seen in over 20 years of calling the GIO Schoolboy Cup.

== Playing career ==
=== Early career ===
Fifita played his junior rugby league for Souths Acacia Ridge. In 2015, he was 18th man for the Queensland Under-16 rugby league team, despite being a year younger. He then competed at the ASSRL U15s Tournament, playing for Queensland U15s Schoolboys Maroons team. He was selected for the Australian U15s Schoolboys Merit team. In 2016, he was once again selected for the Queensland Under-16 rugby league team at lock and captained the side. He was part of the Keebra Park side, which also featured Payne Haas, that narrowly lost to Westfields Sports High School in the GIO Schoolboy Cup Final. In 2017, Fifita competed at the ASSRL U18s Tournament, playing for Queensland U18s Schoolboys team. He was chosen for the Australian U18s Schoolboys team, which toured New Zealand. Later in the year, he captained Keebra Park in the GIO Schoolboy Cup Final against Westfields Sports High School, which Keebra Park won.

=== 2018 ===
On 13 February 2018, extended his contract with the Brisbane Broncos to the end of the 2020 NRL season. Fifita started by the year by playing in the Queensland Cup for the Souths Logan Magpies. In Round 16 of the 2018 NRL season, Fifita made his NRL debut for the Brisbane Broncos against the Canberra Raiders, becoming the first player born in the 2000s to make his NRL debut. Fifita played 47 minutes off the interchange bench during the 26-22 comeback win at Suncorp Stadium and coach Wayne Bennett commented on his impressive debut, "I liked it because he played mistake free and that is all you can ask", "He was good and never let anybody down, He did a really good job for us." In Round 23 against the South Sydney Rabbitohs, Fifita scored his first NRL career try in Brisbane's 38–18 win at Suncorp Stadium. Fifita finished his promising NRL debut year with him playing in 11 matches and scoring 2 tries for Brisbane in the 2018 NRL season. On 17 December 2018, Fifita was selected in the 15-man emerging Queensland squad.

=== 2019 ===
On 15 February 2019, Fifita represented the Indigenous All Stars against the New Zealand Māori All Stars team, playing off the interchange bench and scoring a try in the 34–14 win at AAMI Park. After having some solid performances leading up to the 2019 State of Origin series, Fifita earned selection in the Queensland Maroons squad. Fifita made history as he was the first player born in the 2000s to play Origin, Queensland Coach Kevin Walters commenting about his selection, "I rang him and told him he had made the Queensland under 18 team," Walters said on Monday. "He said, 'No, I am too old for that, "I said, 'Well you better come and play Origin then.'"

On 30 September, Fifita was named on the bench for the Australia PM XIII side. On 7 October 2019, Fifita was named at second row for the U23 Junior Australian side.

=== 2020 ===
On 27 April, it was revealed that Fifita would be ruled out from playing indefinitely after undergoing knee surgery. On July 25, it was announced that Fifita had signed a record three-year deal, worth over $3 million with the Gold Coast.

Fifita played nine games for Brisbane in the 2020 NRL season as the club finished last on the table for the first time ever in their history. Brisbane only managed to win only three games for the entire year out of a possible 20 matches.

=== 2021 ===
In round 5 of the 2021 NRL season, he scored a hat-trick in the Gold Coast's 42-16 victory over Newcastle.

In round 7 against South Sydney, he scored his second hat-trick of the year in a 30-40 loss.

On 11 May, Fifita was suspended for two matches after being found guilty of a careless high tackle during the club's round 9 victory over Wests Tigers.

Fifita played for Queensland in the first two games of the 2021 State of Origin series before being suspended for game 3.

=== 2022 ===
Following the Gold Coast's round 8 loss to Penrith, it was revealed that Fifita had suffered a grade 2 MCL sprain and would miss four matches. He played a total of 18 games as the Gold Coast finished 13th on the table.

=== 2023 ===
Fifita played in all three games of the 2023 State of Origin series for Queensland as they won the shield 2-1. On 11 August, Fifita re-signed with the Gold Coast side until the end of the 2026 NRL season. Fifita played a total of 22 matches for the Gold Coast in the 2023 NRL season and scored eight tries as the club finished 14th on the table.

=== 2024 ===
On 9 May, it was announced that Fifita had not taken up his option for a contract extension at the Gold Coast and would leave the club following the conclusion of the 2024 NRL season. On the same day, it was announced he would join the Sydney Roosters on a multi-year deal. On 15 May, less than a week after announcing that he was joining the Sydney Roosters, Fifita announced that he had enacted the clause in his contract and decided to stay with the Gold Coast Titans until the end of 2026. In the wake of Fifita backflipping on his deal with the Sydney Roosters, Nick Politis spoke to the media stating “It is hard to understand,” Politis told the Daily Telegraph. "He approached us. And did the same with Penrith. After coming Sydney to meet with Roosters coach Trent Robinson and the rest of the coaching staff, it's hard to understand how he can display and create uncertainty. We’ve decided withdraw our offer". Fifita made 20 appearances for the Gold Coast throughout the 2024 NRL season as the club finished 14th on the table.

=== 2025 ===
Ahead of the Gold Coast's round 9 match against Canterbury, Fifita was left out of the starting 17 by head coach Des Hasler after Fifita reportedly had a disagreement with Hasler about switching to the left edge of attack. On 7 May, Fifita was ruled out indefinitely with an ankle injury. Fifita returned to the Gold Coast side for their round 19 match against Brisbane. In August, it was announced that Fifita would miss the rest of the 2025 NRL season with injury. On 29 October, the South Sydney Rabbitohs announced the signing of Fifita on a two-year deal.

=== 2026 ===
In round 1 of the 2026 NRL season, Fifita made his club debut for South Sydney in their 40-30 victory over the Dolphins. Fifita played 17 games for South Sydney in the 2026 NRL season as the club finished 6th on the table and qualified for the finals. He played in South Sydney's upset elimination final loss to Newcastle.

He captained the Prime Minister's XIII on 3 October 2026 in the 10-60 win over PNG Prime Minister's XIII in Port Moresby.

He made his Australia international début in the 2026 Rugby League World Cup 36-22 win over Fiji on 25 October 2026.

== Statistics ==
Year	Team	Games	Tries	Pts
2018	Brisbane Broncos	11	2	8
2019	Brisbane Broncos	24	7	28
2020	Brisbane Broncos	9	4	16
2021	Gold Coast Titans	22	17	68
2022	Gold Coast Titans	18	7	28
2023	Gold Coast Titans	22	8	32
2024	Gold Coast Titans	20	4	16
2025	Gold Coast Titans	8	1	4
2026	South Sydney Rabbitohs	17	6	24
2027	South Sydney Rabbitohs			
	Totals	151	56	224

== Honours ==
Representative

- Rugby League World Cup Champion: 2026

== Controversies ==
On 9 November 2019, Fifita was arrested in Bali after an alleged altercation with a bouncer at a nightclub called La Favela. On 11 November, Fifita was released from jail after the bouncer who was allegedly assaulted accepted Fifita's apology. After Fifita left the prison, he spoke to the media saying "I want to thank everyone involved and obviously, the police. I will make a further statement later in the week".

Brisbane Broncos CEO Paul White spoke to the media saying "I don't know too many 19-year-old men ... of his background, who have had an experience like that, I know, having a policing background, that being in a cell is not a great experience, and being in one in a foreign country was pretty confronting. He'll learn a big lesson".

On 27 December 2020, Fifita was arrested on the Gold Coast, but later released without charge after trespassing following a night of drinking. It was reported that Fifita was invited back to the room of an unidentified female but went to the wrong room at the address, where other people called the police.

In February 2021, the NRL reopened its investigation into the trespassing situation as it was revealed that the Titans had, in breach of salary cap rules, made a payment to the family where Fifita had trespassed. In June 2021, Fifita was fined $20,000 by the league for breaching their alcohol code of conduct and bringing the game into disrepute. This again was related to the December 2020 trespassing incident.

On 31 December 2022, it was reported that Fifita had been involved in a verbal altercation with Brisbane player Reece Walsh at a Gold Coast nightclub. It was alleged that the pair had to be separated by security staff.
