= Sea Swift =

Australian shipping company

Coordinates: 16°56′48″S 145°46′13″E

Sea Swift Pty Ltd
- Type: Private
- Industry: Shipping industry
- Founded: 1987
- Founder: Sid Faithfull
- Headquarters: Cairns, Australia
- Area served: Northern Australia, including Far North Queensland, Torres Strait, Northern Territory, and Tiwi Islands
- Services: Cargo freight services, project charter, fuel, maritime logistical support
- Number of employees: 520+
- Divisions: Project Logistics, Sea Freight, Engineering, General Cargo
- Website: www.seaswift.com.au

Sea Swift is a north Australian shipping company. The company operates in Northern Australia, mainly servicing remote, coastal, and regional communities in Far North Queensland and the Northern Territory. The company provides cargo and freight, engineering and maritime logistical support, and bulk fuel deliveries, operating linehaul vessels and landing craft vessels, in addition to barges, tugs and landing craft.

== History ==
Sea Swift started in 1987 when founder Sid Faithfull identified an opportunity to service Gulf of Carpentaria fishing fleets by mothershipping from Karumba. Over the next 25 years, Sea Swift grew to become Australia's largest privately owned shipping company, operating regular freight, and project logistics from its Cairns headquarters to communities throughout Far North Queensland. Expanding to a fleet of purpose-built vessels (including linehauls, landing craft, and tug and barge), nine depots, and over 520 staff across all depots in Queensland and the Northern Territory. Today, Sea Swift continues to service remote communities along Cape York Peninsula and in the Gulf of Carpentaria, as well as the Torres Strait Islands, including Horn Island, Thursday Island and the Outer Torres Strait Islands islands.

In early 2013, through the acquisition of Tiwi Barge, Sea Swift commenced an operation in the Northern Territory. The initial two-vessel and 15-person operation servicing four destinations has grown to become a nine-vessel, 144-person, three-depot operation servicing 25 destinations across the Territory.

Now, Sea Swift services thousands of people in remote communities every week. The company operates 365 days a year regardless of the often challenging weather conditions experienced in the Far North. Many communities in the Torres Strait would be almost completely isolated from essential goods and services if Sea Swift did not deliver to them. Sea Swift service most locations in the Torres Strait, including Saibai Island, 16 km from the coast of Papua New Guinea.

== Services ==
Sea Swift provides several different services for remote, regional and coastal areas of Northern Australia:

- Project Logistics and Charter – barge/tug and landing craft operations and crewed (or bare boat) vessel chartering.
- Sea Freight and General Cargo – scheduled cargo, fuel and freight services accommodating regional break bulk, bulk fuel and container freight requirements.
- Bulk Fuel – Sea Swift is the region's leader in bulk fuel transport and reliable transport of fuels and oils from private business to large-scale industries in Northern Australia. Their customer base includes fuel-stations, mines, remote service stations, local councils and retail outlets.

Sea Swift's Project Logistics unit has seen jobs completed domestically to destinations including Gladstone, the Torres Strait Islands - both inner islands and the Outer Torres Strait Islands (OTSI), Mornington Island, Lizard Island, Palm Island, Darwin, Gove, Tiwi Islands, Arnhem Land, Groote Eylandt and many others. Clients serviced include large government departments and influential national stakeholders in the food, essential services, and mining industries, amongst others.

== Depot Locations ==
- Cairns (QLD head office)
- Horn Island
- Thursday Island
- Badu
- Seisia/Bamaga
- Weipa
- Darwin (NT head office)
- Gove
- Groote Eylandt

== Vessels ==
Sea Swift has a range of purpose-built and strategically designed vessels to service Northern Australia. The following vessels are currently within Sea Swift's fleet.

=== Linehaul Vessels ===
- MV Newcastle Bay – General cargo
- MV WARRENDER – General cargo
- MV Territorian – General cargo

=== Landing craft ===
- Albatross Bay
- Arnhem Trader
- Bhagwan Mover
- Biquele Bay
- Cygnet
- Fourcroy
- Malu Chief
- Malu Explorer
- Malu Titan
- Malu Trojan
- Malu Warrior
- Punsand Bay
- Tiwi Islander

=== Tugs ===
- Cossack
- King River
- Norman River
- Staaten River

=== Barges ===
- SSB1802
- SSB1803
