= September 2009 in sports =

<<	September 2009					>>
Su	Mo	Tu	We	Th	Fr	Sa
		1	2	3	4	5
6	7	8	9	10	11	12
13	14	15	16	17	18	19
20	21	22	23	24	25	26
27	28	29	30
Sports

This list shows notable sports-related deaths, events, and notable outcomes that occurred in September of 2009.

== Deaths in September ==
- 22: Bruce McPhee
- 16: Myles Brand
- 14: Darren Sutherland
- 12: Jack Kramer

== Current sporting seasons ==
=== American football 2009 ===
- NFL
- NCAA Division I FBS

=== Auto racing 2009 ===
- Formula One
- Sprint Cup
- IRL IndyCar Series
- World Rally Championship
- Formula Two
- Nationwide Series
- Camping World Truck Series
- WTTC
- V8 Supercar
- American Le Mans
- Superleague Formula
- Rolex Sports Car Series
- FIA GT Championship
- Formula Three
- World Series by Renault
- Deutsche Tourenwagen Masters
- Super GT

=== Baseball 2009 ===
- Major League Baseball
- Nippon Professional Baseball

=== Basketball 2009 ===
- WNBA (Playoffs)
- Euroleague
- Philippine collegiate:
  - NCAA
  - UAAP (Playoffs)

=== Canadian football 2009 ===
- Canadian Football League

=== Football (soccer) 2009 ===
National teams competitions

- 2010 FIFA World Cup Qualifying

International clubs competitions

- UEFA (Europe) Champions League
- Europa League
- AFC (Asia) Champions League
- CAF (Africa) Champions League
- CONCACAF (North & Central America) Champions League

Domestic (national) competitions

- Argentina
- Australia
- Brazil
- England
- France
- Germany
- Italy
- Japan
- Norway
- Russia
- Scotland
- Spain
- Major League Soccer (USA & Canada)

=== Golf 2009 ===
- European Tour
- PGA Tour
- LPGA Tour
- Champions Tour

=== Motorcycle racing 2009 ===
- Superbike World Championship
- Supersport racing

=== Rugby league 2009 ===
- Super League
- NRL

=== Rugby union 2009 ===
- English Premiership
- Celtic League
- Top 14
- Currie Cup
- Air New Zealand Cup

== Days of the month ==
=== September 30, 2009 (Wednesday) ===
==== Baseball ====
- Major League Baseball: (teams in **bold** clinch division title, teams in italics clinch wild card berth)
  - American League:
    - Detroit Tigers 7, Minnesota Twins 2
      - The Tigers lead by 3 games over the Twins in the race for the Central Division title with 4 games remaining.
  - National League:
    - **Philadelphia Phillies** 10, Houston Astros 3
    - Florida Marlins 5, Atlanta Braves 4
      - The Phillies clinch the East Division title for the 3rd straight season.
    - San Diego Padres 5, Los Angeles Dodgers 0
    - Colorado Rockies 10, Milwaukee Brewers 6
      - The Dodgers, already assured of a playoff berth, fail to clinch the West Division title, while the Rockies' win puts them 4 games ahead of the Braves for the wild card berth.

==== Cricket ====
- ICC Champions Trophy in South Africa: (teams in **bold** advance to the semifinals)
  - Group A:
    - **Pakistan** 205/6 (50 ov); **Australia** 206/8 (50 ov) at Centurion. **Australia win by 2 wickets.**
    - West Indies 129 (36 ov); India 130/3 (32.1 ov) at Johannesburg. **India win by 7 wickets.**
      - Final standings: Australia 5 points, Pakistan 4, India 3, West Indies 0.

==== Football (soccer) ====
- U-20 World Cup in Egypt: (teams in **bold** advance to the round of 16)
  - Group E:
    - Australia 0–3 Costa Rica
    - **Brazil** 0–0 **Czech Republic**
      - Standings: Brazil, Czech Republic 4 points, Costa Rica 3, Australia 0.
  - Group F:
    - Hungary 4–0 South Africa
    - **United Arab Emirates** 1–0 Honduras
      - Standings: United Arab Emirates 4 points, Honduras, Hungary 3, South Africa 1.
- UEFA Champions League group stage, Matchday 2:
  - Group A:
    - Bayern Munich (Germany) 0–0 (Italy) Juventus
    - Bordeaux (France) 1–0 (Israel) Maccabi Haifa
      - Standings: Bayern Munich, Bordeaux 4 points, Juventus 2, Maccabi Haifa 0.
  - Group B:
    - Manchester United (England) 2–1 (Germany) Wolfsburg
    - CSKA Moscow (Russia) 2–1 (Turkey) Beşiktaş
      - Standings: Manchester United 6 points, Wolfsburg, CSKA Moscow 3, Beşiktaş 0.
  - Group C:
    - Milan (Italy) 0–1 (Switzerland) Zürich
    - Real Madrid (Spain) 3–0 (France) Marseille
      - Standings: Real Madrid 6 points, Zürich, Milan 3, Marseille 0.
  - Group D:
    - APOEL (Cyprus) 0–1 (England) Chelsea
    - Porto (Portugal) 2–0 (Spain) Atlético Madrid
      - Standings: Chelsea 6 points, Porto 3, APOEL, Atlético Madrid 1.
- Copa Sudamericana Round of 16, second leg: (first leg score in parentheses)
  - Vitória (Brazil) 1–1 (1–4) (Uruguay) **River Plate**. River Plate win 5–2 on aggregate.
  - Cienciano (Peru) 0–2 (0–3) (Argentina) **San Lorenzo**. San Lorenzo win 5–0 on aggregate.
  - **Universidad de Chile** 1–0 (1–1) (Brazil) Internacional. Universidad de Chile win 2–1 on aggregate.
  - Emelec (Ecuador) 2–1 (0–2) (Brazil) **Botafogo**. Botafogo win 3–2 on aggregate.
- AFC Champions League Quarter Finals, second leg: (first leg score in parentheses)
  - **Pohang Steelers** (South Korea) 4–1(ET) (1–3) (Uzbekistan) Bunyodkor. Pohang Steelers win 5–4 on aggregate.
  - **Nagoya Grampus** (Japan) 3–1 (1–2) (Japan) Kawasaki Frontale. Nagoya Grampus win 4–3 on aggregate.
  - FC Seoul (South Korea) 1–1 (2–3) (Qatar) **Umm-Salal**. Umm-Salal win 4–3 on aggregate.
  - **Al-Ittihad** (Saudi Arabia) 4–0 (1–1) (Uzbekistan) Pakhtakor Tashkent. Al-Ittihad win 5–1 on aggregate.
- CONCACAF Champions League Group Stage, round 5: (teams in **bold** advance to the quarterfinals)
  - Group A:
    - Houston Dynamo (United States) 0–1 (Mexico) **Pachuca**
      - Standings: Pachuca 12 points, Árabe Unido 10, Houston Dynamo 7, Isidro Metapán 0.
  - Group B:
    - D.C. United (United States) 5–1 (Trinidad and Tobago) San Juan Jabloteh
      - Standings: Toluca 12 points (4 matches), D.C. United 9 (5), Marathón 6 (4), San Juan Jabloteh 0 (5).
  - Group D:
    - **UNAM** (Mexico) 2–1 (Trinidad and Tobago) W Connection
    - Real España (Honduras) 2–0 (Guatemala) Comunicaciones
      - Standings: UNAM 13 points, Communicaciones, Real España 6, W Connection 4.
- Friendly international matches:
  - Argentina 2–0 Ghana
  - Mexico 1–2 Colombia

==== Volleyball ====
- European Women's Championship in Poland: (teams in **bold** advance to the semifinals)
  - Pool E in Łódź:
    - Bulgaria 3–1 Spain
    - Russia 1–3 Poland
    - Belgium 0–3 **Netherlands**
      - Standings: Netherlands 8 points, Russia, Poland 7, Bulgaria 6, Belgium, Spain 4.
  - Pool F in Katowice:
    - Czech Republic 0–3 **Italy**
    - Serbia 2–3 Germany
    - Azerbaijan 1–3 Turkey
      - Standings: Italy 8 points, Germany 7, Serbia, Turkey 6, Czech Republic 5, Azerbaijan 4.
- Asian Men's Championship in Manila, Philippines: (teams in **bold** advance to the second round)
  - Pool A:
    - Chinese Taipei 0–3 Kazakhstan
      - Standings (2 matches): Kazakhstan 4 points, Myanmar, Chinese Taipei 3, Philippines 2.
  - Pool B:
    - India 3–0 Thailand
      - Standings: **Japan (Heian period)**, **Indonesia** 4 points (2 matches), India 4 (3), Thailand 3 (3).
  - Pool C:
    - **Iran** 3–0 Vietnam
    - Sri Lanka 0–3 **China**
      - Standings: China 7 points (4 matches), Iran 6 (3), Sri Lanka, Vietnam 4 (3), Hong Kong 3 (3).
  - Pool D:
    - South Korea 3–1 Australia
    - Qatar 0–3 Lebanon
      - Standings: Australia 7 points (4 matches), South Korea 6 (3), Lebanon 5 (3), Qatar, Maldives 3 (3).
- South American Women's Championship in Porto Alegre, Brazil:
  - Pool A:
    - Uruguay 0–3 Argentina
    - Brazil 3–0 Paraguay
      - Standings: Brazil, Argentina 2 points, Uruguay, Paraguay 1.
  - Pool B:
    - Venezuela 1–3 Colombia
    - Peru 3–0 Chile
      - Standings: Peru, Colombia 2 points, Venezuela, Chile 1.
- African Men's Championship in Tétouan, Morocco: (teams in **bold** advance to the semifinals)
  - Group A:
    - South Africa 0–3 **Cameroon**
      - Standings: Cameroon 5 points (3 matches), Morocco 4 (2), Libya 3 (2), South Africa 3 (3).
  - Group B:
    - Algeria 3–0 Botswana
    - **Egypt** 3–1 Tunisia
      - Standings: Egypt 8 points (4 matches), Algeria, Tunisia 5 (3), Botswana, Gabon 3 (3).

=== September 29, 2009 (Tuesday) ===
==== Baseball ====
- Major League Baseball:
  - The Boston Red Sox clinch the American League wild card thanks to the Texas Rangers' 5–2 loss to the Los Angeles Angels of Anaheim, who will be the Red Sox opponents in the Division Series.

==== Basketball ====
- WNBA Finals:
  - Game 1 at Phoenix: (W1) Phoenix Mercury 120, (E1) Indiana Fever 116 (OT). **Mercury lead the best-of-5 series 1–0.**
    - The WNBA Finals go off to a flying start with the highest-scoring game in the league's history.
- Euroleague:
  - First preliminary round, game 1:
    - Charleroi (Belgium) 55–53 (France) Orléans
    - Ventspils (Latvia) 78–73 (Italy) Benetton Treviso
    - Le Mans (France) 61–60 (Germany) ALBA Berlin
    - Aris Salonica (Greece) 69–67 (Greece) Maroussi

==== Cricket ====
- ICC Champions Trophy in South Africa: (teams in **bold** advance to the semifinals)
  - Group B:
    - **England** 146 (43.1 ov); **New Zealand** 147/6 (27.1 ov) at Johannesburg. **New Zealand win by 4 wickets**.
      - Final standings: New Zealand, England 4 points, Sri Lanka, South Africa 2.

==== Football (soccer) ====
- U-20 World Cup in Egypt: (teams in **bold** advance to the round of 16)
  - Group C:
    - South Korea 1–1 **Germany**
    - United States 4–1 Cameroon
      - Standings: Germany 4 points, USA, Cameroon 3, South Korea 1.
  - Group D:
    - **Uruguay** 3–0 Uzbekistan
    - **Ghana** 4–0 England
      - Standings: Ghana, Uruguay 6 points, Uzbekistan, England 0.
- UEFA Champions League group stage, Matchday 2:
  - Group E:
    - Fiorentina (Italy) 2–0 (England) Liverpool
    - Debrecen (Hungary) 0–4 (France) Lyon
      - Standings: Lyon 6 points, Fiorentina, Liverpool 3, Debrecen 0.
  - Group F:
    - Rubin Kazan (Russia) 1–1 (Italy) Internazionale
    - Barcelona (Spain) 2–0 (Ukraine) Dynamo Kyiv
      - Standings: Barcelona 4 points, Dynamo Kyiv 3, Inter 2, Rubin Kazan 1.
  - Group G:
    - Unirea Urziceni (Romania) 1–1 (Germany) Stuttgart
    - Rangers (Scotland) 1–4 (Spain) Sevilla
      - Standings: Sevilla 6 points, Stuttgart 2, Unirea Urziceni, Rangers 1.
  - Group H:
    - Arsenal (England) 2–0 (Greece) Olympiacos
    - AZ (Netherlands) 1–1 (Belgium) Standard Liège
      - Standings: Arsenal 6 points, Olympiacos 3, Standard Liège, Arizona 1.
- CONCACAF Champions League Group Stage, round 5: (teams in **bold** advance to the quarterfinals)
  - Group A:
    - Árabe Unido (Panama) 6–0 (El Salvador) Isidro Metapán
      - Standings: Árabe Unido 10 points (5 matches), Pachuca 9 (4), Houston Dynamo 7 (4), Isidro Metapán 0 (5).
  - Group C:
    - Columbus Crew (United States) 1–1 (Costa Rica) Saprissa
    - **Cruz Azul** (Mexico) 2–0 Puerto Rico Islanders
      - Standings: Cruz Azul 13 points, Columbus Crew 7, Saprissa 5, Puerto Rico Islanders 2.

==== Ice hockey ====
- Victoria Cup in Zürich, Switzerland:
  - ZSC Lions 2–1 Chicago Blackhawks

==== Volleyball ====
- European Women's Championship in Poland:
  - Pool E in Łódź:
    - Spain 1–3 Russia
    - Netherlands 3–0 Bulgaria
    - Poland 3–1 Belgium
      - Standings: Netherlands, Russia 6 points, Poland 5, Bulgaria 4, Belgium, Spain 3.
  - Pool F in Katowice:
    - Italy 3–0 Azerbaijan
    - Germany 3–0 Czech Republic
    - Turkey 3–1 Serbia
      - Standings: Italy 6 points, Serbia, Germany 5, Turkey, Czech Republic 4, Azerbaijan 3.
- Asian Men's Championship in Manila, Philippines: (teams in **bold** advance to the second round)
  - Pool A:
    - Kazakhstan 3–0 Philippines
  - Pool B:
    - Thailand 0–3 **Japan**
      - **Indonesia** also advance to the second round.
  - Pool C:
    - China 2–3 Iran
    - Vietnam 3–0 Hong Kong
  - Pool D:
    - Australia 3–1 Qatar
    - Lebanon 3–0 Maldives
- African Men's Championship in Tétouan, Morocco:
  - Group A:
    - Libya 3–1 South Africa
  - Group B:
    - Egypt 3–0 Botswana
    - Algeria 3–0 Gabon

=== September 28, 2009 (Monday) ===
==== American football ====
- NFL Monday Night Football week 3:
  - Dallas Cowboys 21, Carolina Panthers 7
    - The Cowboys get their first win at their new stadium.

==== Baseball ====
- Major League Baseball:
  - The Los Angeles Angels of Anaheim clinch the American League West division title with an 11–0 win over the Texas Rangers, who are 6 games behind the Boston Red Sox in the race for wild card berth.

==== Cricket ====
- ICC Champions Trophy in South Africa: (teams in **bold** advance to the semifinals)
  - Group A:
    - Australia 234/4 (42.3 ov) v India at Centurion. **No result**.
      - Standings: **Pakistan** 4 points, Australia 3, India 1, West Indies 0.

==== Football (soccer) ====
- U-20 World Cup in Egypt: (teams in **bold** advance to the round of 16)
  - Group A:
    - Italy 2–1 Trinidad and Tobago
    - Egypt 1–2 Paraguay
      - Standings: Italy, Paraguay 4 points, Egypt 3, Trinidad and Tobago 0.
  - Group B:
    - Nigeria 0–2 **Spain**
    - Tahiti 0–8 **Venezuela**
      - Standings: Spain, Venezuela 6 points, Nigeria, Tahiti 0.

==== Volleyball ====
- Asian Men's Championship in Manila, Philippines:
  - Pool A:
    - Chinese Taipei 3–2 Myanmar
  - Pool B:
    - Indonesia 3–0 Thailand
    - Japan 3–1 India
  - Pool C:
    - Iran 3–1 Sri Lanka
    - Hong Kong 0–3 China
  - Pool D:
    - Qatar 2–3 South Korea
    - Maldives 0–3 Australia
- African Men's Championship in Tétouan, Morocco:
  - Group A:
    - Morocco 3–2 Cameroon
  - Group B:
    - Gabon 0–3 Tunisia
    - Egypt 3–1 Algeria

=== September 27, 2009 (Sunday) ===
==== American football ====
- NFL week 3 (teams at 3–0 in **bold**):
  - Detroit Lions 19, Washington Redskins 14
    - The Lions end their 19-game losing streak despite Jason Campbell passing for 327 yards and two touchdowns.
  - Green Bay Packers 36, St. Louis Rams 17
  - **Minnesota Vikings** 27, San Francisco 49ers 24
    - Brett Favre throws for 301 yards and two TDs, including the game-winner to Greg Lewis with 12 seconds left.
  - New England Patriots 26, Atlanta Falcons 10
  - **New York Jets** 24, Tennessee Titans 17
  - Philadelphia Eagles 34, Kansas City Chiefs 14
    - Kevin Kolb throws for 327 yards and two touchdowns to lead the Eagles, while Michael Vick makes his return to the NFL after 18 months in prison.
  - **New York Giants** 24, Tampa Bay Buccaneers 0
    - The Giants defense allows only 86 total yards.
  - **Baltimore Ravens** 34, Cleveland Browns 3
    - Joe Flacco throws for 342 yards and a touchdown while the Ravens defense allows only 186 yards.
  - Jacksonville Jaguars 31, Houston Texans 24
    - Maurice Jones-Drew runs for 119 yards and three TDs to lead the Jags, while Matt Schaub throws for 300 yards and three TDs in a losing effort.
  - **New Orleans Saints** 27, Buffalo Bills 7
  - Chicago Bears 25, Seattle Seahawks 19
  - San Diego Chargers 23, Miami Dolphins 13
  - Cincinnati Bengals 23, Pittsburgh Steelers 20
    - Carson Palmer brings the Bengals back from a 20–9 fourth quarter deficit with two TD passes, including the game-winner to Andre Caldwell with 14 seconds left.
  - **Denver Broncos** 23, Oakland Raiders 3
    - The Broncos defense allows only 137 total yards.
  - Sunday Night Football: **Indianapolis Colts** 31, Arizona Cardinals 10
    - Peyton Manning's 379 yards and four TDs passing trumps Kurt Warner's 332 yards and one touchdown.

==== Auto racing ====
- Formula One:
  - Singapore Grand Prix in Singapore:
    - (1) Lewis Hamilton (GBR) (McLaren–Mercedes) 1:56:06.337 (2) Timo Glock (GER) (Toyota) +9.634 (3) Fernando Alonso (ESP) (Renault) +16.624
      - Drivers' standings (after 14 of 17 races): (1) Jenson Button (GBR) (Brawn-Mercedes) 84 points (2) Rubens Barrichello (BRA) (Brawn-Mercedes) 69 (3) Sebastian Vettel (GER) (Red Bull-Renault) 59
      - Constructors' standings: (1) Brawn-Mercedes 153 (2) Red Bull-Renault 110.5 (3) Ferrari 62
- Chase for the Sprint Cup:
  - AAA 400 in Dover, Delaware:
    - (1) Jimmie Johnson (California) (Chevrolet, Hendrick Motorsports) (2) Mark Martin (Arkansas) (Chevrolet, Hendrick Motorsports) (3) Matt Kenseth (Wisconsin) (Ford, Roush Fenway Racing)
      - Drivers' standings (with 8 races remaining): (1) Martin 5400 points (2) Johnson 5390 (3) Juan Pablo Montoya (Colombia) (Chevrolet, Earnhardt Ganassi Racing) 5335

==== Badminton ====
- BWF Super Series:
  - Japan Super Series in Tokyo: (seeding in parentheses)
    - Men's singles final: Bao Chunlai (CHN) bt Taufik Hidayat (INA) (4) 21–15, 21–12
    - Women's singles final: Wang Yihan (CHN) (4) bt Wang Xin (CHN) 21–8, 21–9
    - Men's doubles final: Markis Kido/Hendra Setiawan (INA) (1) bt Yonathan Suryatama Dasuki/Rian Sukmawan (INA) 21–19, 24–22
    - Women's doubles final: Ma Jin/Wang Xiaoli (CHN) (5) bt Miyuki Maeda/Satoko Suetsuna (JPN) (7) 21–19, 21–18
    - Mixed doubles final: Songphon Anugritayawon/Kunchala Voravichitchaikul (THA) bt Joachim Fischer Nielsen/Christinna Pedersen (DEN) (6) 13–21, 21–16, 22–20

==== Baseball ====
- World Cup in Italy:
  - Final: (gold) **United States** 10–5 (silver) Cuba
    - United States win the title for the fourth time.
- Major League Baseball:
  - The New York Yankees, already secured in the postseason, clinch the American League East division title and the League's best record with a 4–2 win over the Boston Red Sox.

==== Basketball ====
- Americas Championship for Women in Cuiabá, Brazil:
  - Seventh place game: **Venezuela** 87–82 (OT) Dominican Republic
  - Fifth place game: **Puerto Rico** 61–49 Chile
  - Third place game: Cuba 49–59 (OT) (bronze) **Canada**
    - Canada outscore Cuba 11–1 in overtime and qualify for the 2010 World Championship.
  - Final: (gold) **Brazil** 71–48 (silver) Argentina
    - Brazil win the title for the 4th time.

==== Cricket ====
- ICC Champions Trophy in South Africa: (teams in **bold** advance to the semifinals)
  - Group B:
    - New Zealand 315/7 (50 ov); Sri Lanka 277 (46.4 ov) at Johannesburg. **New Zealand win by 38 runs**.
    - **England** 323/8 (50 ov); South Africa 301/9 (50 ov, Graeme Smith 141) at Centurion. **England win by 22 runs**.
      - Standings: England 4 points (2 matches), Sri Lanka 2 (3), New Zealand 2 (2), South Africa 2 (3).

==== Cycling ====
- Road World Championships in Mendrisio, Switzerland:
  - Road race:
    - Men Elite, 262.2 km: (gold) Cadel Evans (AUS) 6h 56' 26" (silver) Alexandr Kolobnev (RUS) + 27" (bronze) Joaquim Rodríguez (ESP) + 27"
      - Evans is the first Australian winner in the World Championships road race.

==== Football (soccer) ====
- U-20 World Cup in Egypt:
  - Group E:
    - Brazil 5–0 Costa Rica
    - Czech Republic 2–1 Australia
  - Group F:
    - United Arab Emirates 2–2 South Africa
    - Honduras 3–0 Hungary

==== Golf ====
- PGA Tour:
  - FedEx Cup Playoffs:
    - The Tour Championship in Atlanta:
      - Tournament winner: Phil Mickelson (USA) 271 (−9)
      - FedEx Cup winner: Tiger Woods' second-place finish in Atlanta is enough to secure the season title.
- European Tour:
  - Vivendi Trophy with Seve Ballesteros in Saint-Nom-la-Bretèche, France:
    - Great Britain & Ireland 16½–11½ Continental Europe
      - Team Great Britain & Ireland win for the fifth successive time, the last three by the same score.
- LPGA Tour:
  - CVS/pharmacy LPGA Challenge in Blackhawk, California:
    - Winner: Sophie Gustafson (SWE) 269 (−19)

==== Motorcycle racing ====
- Superbike:
  - Imola Superbike World Championship round in Imola, Italy:
    - Race 1: (1) Noriyuki Haga (JPN) (Ducati) 38:32.199 (2) Max Biaggi (ITA) (Aprilia) +2.074 (3) Michel Fabrizio (ITA) (Ducati) +2.190
    - Race 2: (1) Fabrizio 38:23.143 (2) Haga +3.592 (3) Marco Simoncelli (ITA) (Aprilia) +6.510
      - Riders' standings (after 12 of 14 rounds): (1) Haga 391 points (2) Ben Spies (USA) (Yamaha) 388 (3) Fabrizio 330
      - Manufacturers' standings: (1) Ducati 489 points (2) Yamaha 431 (3) Honda 368

==== Squash ====
- Women's World Open in Amsterdam, Netherlands:
  - Final: (1) Nicol David (MAS) bt (2) Natalie Grinham (NED) 3–11, 11–6, 11–3, 11–2
    - David wins the title for the fourth time, while Grinham is runner-up for the fourth time.

==== Tennis ====
- ATP World Tour:
  - BCR Open Romania in Bucharest, Romania:
    - Final: Albert Montañés (ESP) (5) bt Juan Mónaco (ARG) (3) 7–6 (2), 7–6 (6)
      - Montañés wins his second title of the year and third of his career.
  - Open de Moselle in Metz, France:
    - Final: Gaël Monfils (FRA) (1) bt Philipp Kohlschreiber (GER) (2) 7–6 (1), 3–6, 6–2
      - Monfils wins his second title and first in four years.
- WTA Tour:
  - Hansol Korea Open in Seoul, South Korea:
    - Final: Kimiko Date (JPN) bt Anabel Medina Garrigues (ESP) (2) 6–3, 6–3
      - Date, who will celebrate her 39th birthday tomorrow, becomes the second-oldest player in the Open era to win a singles title on the WTA Tour, after Billie Jean King, who won the Edgbaston Cup at Birmingham in 1983 aged 39 and seven months. This is her first title since 1996 and the eighth of her career.
  - Tashkent Open in Tashkent, Uzbekistan:
    - Final: Shahar Pe'er (ISR) (2) bt Akgul Amanmuradova (UZB) 6–3, 6–4
      - Pe'er wins her second tournament in two weeks and the fifth of her career.

==== Volleyball ====
- NORCECA Women's Championship in Bayamón, Puerto Rico:
  - Seventh Place Match: Trinidad and Tobago 0–3 **Costa Rica**
  - Fifth place Match: Mexico 0–3 **Canada**
  - Bronze medal match: United States 2–3 (bronze) **Cuba**
  - Final: (gold) **Dominican Republic** 3–2 (silver) Puerto Rico
    - The Dominican Republic win the title for the first time, and qualify for the World Grand Champions Cup.
- European Women's Championship in Poland: (teams in **bold** advance to the second round)
  - Group A in Łódź:
    - **Poland** 0–3 **Netherlands**
    - Croatia 2–3 **Spain**
      - Final standings: Netherlands 6 points, Poland 5, Spain 4, Croatia 3.
  - Group B in Wrocław:
    - France 1–3 **Italy**
    - **Germany** 3–2 **Turkey**
      - Final standings: Italy 6 points, Germany 5, Turkey 4, France 3.
  - Group C in Bydgoszcz:
    - Belarus 1–3 **Bulgaria**
    - **Russia** 3–2 **Belgium**
      - Final standings: Russia 6 points, Bulgaria 5, Belgium 4, Belarus 3.
  - Group D in Katowice:
    - **Serbia** 3–0 Slovakia
    - **Czech Republic** 3–2 **Azerbaijan**
      - Final standings: Serbia 6 points, Azerbaijan, Czech Republic, Slovakia 4.
- Asian Men's Championship in Manila, Philippines:
  - Pool A:
    - Myanmar 3–2 Philippines
  - Pool B:
    - India 1–3 Indonesia
  - Pool C:
    - Sri Lanka 3–0 Hong Kong
    - China 3–0 Vietnam
  - Pool D:
    - Maldives 0–3 South Korea
    - Australia 3–1 Lebanon
- African Men's Championship in Tétouan, Morocco:
  - Group A:
    - Morocco 3–0 South Africa
    - Libya 2–3 Cameroon
  - Group B:
    - Egypt 3–0 Gabon
    - Botswana 0–3 Tunisia

==== Wrestling ====
- World Championships in Herning, Denmark:
  - Men's Greco-Roman:
    - 66 kg: (gold) Farid Mansurov (AZE) (silver) Manuchar Tskhadaia (GEO) (bronze) Ambako Vakhadze (RUS) & Pedro Isaac (CUB)
    - 74 kg: (gold) Selçuk Çebi (TUR) (silver) Mark Madsen (DEN) (bronze) Aliaksandr Kikiniou (BLR) & Farshad Alizadeh (IRI)
    - 120 kg: (gold) Mijaín López (CUB) (silver) Dremiel Byers (USA) (bronze) Jalmar Sjöberg (SWE) & Rıza Kayaalp (TUR)

=== September 26, 2009 (Saturday) ===
==== American football ====
- NCAA:
  - AP Top 10: (unbeaten teams in **bold**)
    - (1) **Florida** 41, Kentucky 7
      - The Gators' win is marred by a concussion to quarterback Tim Tebow.
    - (2) **Texas** 64, UTEP 7
    - (3) **Alabama** 35, Arkansas 7
    - **Iowa** 21, (5) Penn State 10
    - Oregon 42, (6) California 3
    - (7) **LSU** 30, Mississippi State 26
    - (8) **Boise State** 49, Bowling Green 14
    - (11) Virginia Tech 31, (9) Miami 7
  - Other games:
    - **South Florida** 17, (18) Florida State 7
    - Georgia Tech 24, (22) North Carolina 7
    - Stanford 34, (24) Washington 14
    - (25) Nebraska 55, Louisiana–Lafayette 0
      - The Cornhuskers celebrate their 300th straight home sellout with a blowout win.
  - Other remaining unbeaten teams (rankings in parentheses):
    - (14) Cincinnati, (15) TCU, (17) Houston, (20) Kansas, (23) Michigan, Auburn, Missouri, Texas A&M, Wisconsin

==== Australian rules football ====
- AFL finals series:
  - Grand Final at the MCG, Melbourne:
    - St Kilda 9.14 (68)–12.8 (80) **Geelong**
      - The Cats rally from 7 points down and outscore their opponents 22–3 in the final quarter to win the title for the second time in 3 years and the eighth in their history.

==== Auto racing ====
- Nationwide Series:
  - Dover 200 in Dover, Delaware:
    - (1) Clint Bowyer (Kansas) (Chevrolet, Richard Childress Racing) (2) Mike Bliss (Oregon) (Toyota, CJM Racing) (3) Brad Keselowski (Michigan) (Chevrolet, JR Motorsports)

==== Baseball ====
- Major League Baseball:
  - The Los Angeles Dodgers clinch a playoff berth with an 8–4 win over the Pittsburgh Pirates.
  - The St. Louis Cardinals clinch the National League Central division title with a 6–3 win over the Colorado Rockies.
- World Cup in Italy:
  - Bronze medal game: (bronze) **Canada** 6–2 Puerto Rico
  - 5th place game: **Australia** 4–1 Netherlands
  - 7th place game: **Venezuela** 6–3 Chinese Taipei

==== Basketball ====
- WNBA Playoffs:
  - Eastern Conference Finals:
    - Game 3 at Indianapolis: (1) Indiana Fever 72, (3) Detroit Shock 67. **Fever win the best-of-3 series 2–1**.
  - Western Conference Finals:
    - Game 3 at Phoenix: (1) Phoenix Mercury 85, (3) Los Angeles Sparks 74. **Mercury win the best-of-3 series 2–1**.
- Americas Championship for Women in Cuiabá, Brazil:
  - Semifinals: (winners qualify for 2010 World Championship)
    - **Brazil** 79–59 Cuba
    - **Argentina** 63–53 Canada
  - Classification 5–8:
    - **Puerto Rico** 74–53 Venezuela
    - **Chile** 72–58 Dominican Republic

==== Cricket ====
- ICC Champions Trophy in South Africa:
  - Group A:
    - Australia 275/8 (50 ov); West Indies 225 (46.5 ov) at Johannesburg. **Australia win by 50 runs**.
    - Pakistan 302/9 (50 ov, Shoaib Malik 128); India 248 (44.5 ov) at Centurion. **Pakistan win by 54 runs**.
      - Standings: Pakistan 4 points (2 matches), Australia 2 (1), India 0 (1), West Indies 0 (2).

==== Cycling ====
- Road World Championships in Mendrisio, Switzerland:
  - Road race:
    - Women, 124.2 km: (gold) Tatiana Guderzo (ITA) 3h 33' 25" (silver) Marianne Vos (NED) + 19" (bronze) Noemi Cantele (ITA) + 19"
    - Men U23, 179.4 km: (gold) Romain Sicard (FRA) 4h 41' 54" (silver) Carlos Alberto Betancur (COL) + 27" (bronze) Egor Silin (RUS) + 27"

==== Football (soccer) ====
- U-20 World Cup in Egypt:
  - Group C:
    - United States 0–3 Germany
    - Cameroon 2–0 South Korea
  - Group D:
    - Ghana 2–1 Uzbekistan
    - England 0–1 Uruguay

==== Rugby league ====
- NRL Finals Series:
  - Preliminary final 2 in Melbourne:
    - **Melbourne Storm** 40–10 Brisbane Broncos
      - The Storm reach the Grand final for the fourth successive year.
- Super League play-offs:
  - Preliminary semi-final 2:
    - Hull Kingston Rovers 10–30 **Wigan Warriors**
      - The Warriors advance to the qualifying semifinals to play either Leeds Rhinos or St. Helens.

==== Volleyball ====
- NORCECA Women's Championship in Bayamón, Puerto Rico:
  - Classification 5/8:
    - Trinidad and Tobago 0–3 **Mexico**
    - Costa Rica 0–3 **Canada**
  - Semifinals:
    - **Dominican Republic** 3–2 United States
    - Cuba 2–3 **Puerto Rico**
      - Both matches are decided 21–19 in the fifth set.
- European Women's Championship in Poland: (teams in **bold** advance to the second round)
  - Group A in Łódź:
    - **Poland** 3–0 Croatia
    - Spain 0–3 **Netherlands**
      - Standings: Netherlands, Poland 4 points, Spain, Croatia 2.
  - Group B in Wrocław:
    - **Italy** 3–0 Turkey
    - Germany 3–1 France
      - Standings: Italy 4 points, Turkey, Germany 3, France 2.
  - Group C in Bydgoszcz:
    - Bulgaria 3–2 Belgium
    - **Russia** 3–0 Belarus
      - Standings: Russia 4 points, Belgium, Bulgaria 3, Belarus 2.
  - Group D in Katowice:
    - Slovakia 2–3 Azerbaijan
    - Czech Republic 0–3 **Serbia**
      - Standings: Serbia 4 points, Slovakia, Azerbaijan 3, Czech Republic 2.

==== Wrestling ====
- World Championships in Herning, Denmark:
  - Men's Greco-Roman:
    - 60 kg: (gold) Islambek Albiev (RUS) (silver) Dilshod Aripov (UZB) (bronze) Nurbakyt Tengizbayev (KAZ) & Vitaliy Rahimov (AZE)
    - 84 kg: (gold) Nazmi Avluca (TUR) (silver) Mélonin Noumonvi (FRA) (bronze) Habibollah Akhlaghi (IRI) & Pablo Shorey (CUB)
    - 96 kg: (gold) Balázs Kiss (HUN) (silver) Jimmy Lidberg (SWE) (bronze) Amir Ali-Akbari (IRI) & Aslanbek Khushtov (RUS)

=== September 25, 2009 (Friday) ===
==== Basketball ====
- WNBA Playoffs:
  - Eastern Conference Finals:
    - Game 2 at Indianapolis: (1) Indiana Fever 79, (3) Detroit Shock 75. **Best-of-3 series tied 1–1.**
  - Western Conference Finals:
    - Game 2 at Phoenix: (3) Los Angeles Sparks 87, (1) Phoenix Mercury 76. **Best-of-3 series tied 1–1.**
- Americas Championship for Women in Cuiabá, Brazil: (teams in **bold** advance to the semifinals)
  - Group A:
    - Puerto Rico 83–44 Dominican Republic
    - **Canada** 45–61 **Brazil**
      - Final standings: Brazil 6 points, Canada 5, Puerto Rico 4, Dominican Republic 3.
  - Group B:
    - Chile 77–69 Venezuela
    - **Argentina** 85–81 **Cuba**
      - Final standings: Argentina 6 points, Cuba 5, Chile 4, Venezuela 3.

==== Cricket ====
- ICC Champions Trophy in South Africa:
  - Group B:
    - Sri Lanka 212 (47.3 overs); England 213/4 (45 overs) at Johannesburg. **England win by 6 wickets**.
      - Standings: England 2 points (1 match), Sri Lanka, South Africa 2 (2), New Zealand 0 (1).

==== Football (soccer) ====
- U-20 World Cup in Egypt:
  - Group A:
    - Paraguay 0–0 Italy
  - Group B:
    - Nigeria 0–1 Venezuela
    - Spain 8–0 Tahiti

==== Rugby league ====
- NRL Finals Series:
  - Preliminary final 1 in Sydney:
    - Bulldogs 12–22 **Parramatta Eels**
      - The Eels advance to the grand final for the first time since 2001 and will attempt to win the title after 23-years break.
- Super League play-offs:
  - Preliminary semi-final 1:
    - Huddersfield Giants 6–16 **Catalans Dragons**
      - The Dragons advance to the Qualifying Semifinals to play either Leeds Rhinos or St. Helens.

==== Volleyball ====
- NORCECA Women's Championship in Bayamón, Puerto Rico:
  - Quarterfinals:
    - **United States** 3–1 Canada
    - **Puerto Rico** 3–0 Mexico
- European Women's Championship in Poland:
  - Group A in Łódź:
    - Netherlands 3–0 Croatia
    - Spain 2–3 Poland
  - Group B in Wrocław:
    - Turkey 3–0 France
    - Italy 3–0 Germany
  - Group C in Bydgoszcz:
    - Belgium 3–1 Belarus
    - Bulgaria 0–3 Russia
  - Group D in Katowice:
    - Azerbaijan 0–3 Serbia
    - Slovakia 3–2 Czech Republic

==== Wrestling ====
- World Championships in Herning, Denmark:
  - Women:
    - 67 kg: (gold) Martine Dugrenier (CAN) (silver) Yulia Bartnovskaia (RUS) (bronze) Ifeoma Iheanacho (NGR) & Badrakhyn Odonchimeg (MGL)
    - 72 kg: (gold) Qin Xiaoqing (CHN) (silver) Ochirbatyn Burmaa (MGL) (bronze) Maider Unda (ESP) & Stanka Zlateva (BUL)
  - Men's Greco-Roman:
    - 55 kg: (gold) Hamid Sourian (IRI) (silver) Roman Amoyan (ARM) (bronze) Håkan Nyblom (DEN) & Rovshan Bayramov (AZE)

=== September 24, 2009 (Thursday) ===
==== American football ====
- NCAA AP Top 10:
  - South Carolina 16, (4) Mississippi 10

==== Basketball ====
- Asian Championship for Women in Chennai, India: (top three teams qualify for 2010 World Championship)
  - Final: (silver) South Korea 71–91 (gold) China
  - Bronze medal game: (bronze) Japan 72–57 Chinese Taipei
- Americas Championship for Women in Cuiabá, Brazil: (teams in **bold** advance to the semifinals)
  - Group A:
    - **Canada** 70–57 Puerto Rico
    - **Brazil** 121–62 Dominican Republic
      - Standings: Brazil, Canada 4 points, Puerto Rico, Dominican Republic 2
  - Group B:
    - **Argentina** 62–57 Chile
    - **Cuba** 95–55 Venezuela
      - Standings: Cuba, Argentina 4 points, Chile, Venezuela 2.

==== Cricket ====
- ICC Champions Trophy in South Africa:
  - Group B:
    - New Zealand 214 (47.5 overs); South Africa 217/5 (41.1 overs) at Centurion. **South Africa win by 5 wickets**.

==== Cycling ====
- Road World Championships in Mendrisio, Switzerland:
  - Individual time trials:
    - Men Elite, 49.8 km: (gold) Fabian Cancellara (SUI) 57' 55.74" (silver) Gustav Larsson (SWE) + 1' 27.13" (bronze) Tony Martin (GER) + 2' 30.18"

==== Football (soccer) ====
- U-20 World Cup in Egypt:
  - Group A:
    - Egypt 4–1 Trinidad and Tobago
- Copa Sudamericana Round of 16, first leg:
  - Cerro Porteño (Paraguay) 2–0 (Brazil) Goiás
  - San Lorenzo (Argentina) 3–0 (Peru) Cienciano
  - LDU Quito (Ecuador) 4–0 (Argentina) Lanús
- AFC Champions League Quarter Finals, first leg:
  - Pakhtakor Tashkent (Uzbekistan) 1–1 (Saudi Arabia) Al-Ittihad
- CONCACAF Champions League Group Stage, round 4:
  - Group B:
    - D.C. United (United States) 3–0 (Honduras) Marathón
      - Standings: Toluca 12 points, D.C. United, Marathón 6, San Juan Jabloteh 0.
  - Group D:
    - UNAM (Mexico) 4–0 (Honduras) Real España
      - Standings: UNAM 10 points, Comunicaciones 6, W Connection 4, Real España 3.

==== Snooker ====
- Premier League Snooker – League phase in Southampton:
  - Neil Robertson (AUS) 1–5 Stephen Hendry (SCO)
  - John Higgins (SCO) 3–3 Marco Fu (HKG)
    - Standings: John Higgins 3 points; Ronnie O'Sullivan, Neil Robertson, Judd Trump, Stephen Hendry 2; Marco Fu 1; Shaun Murphy 0.

==== Volleyball ====
- NORCECA Women's Championship in Bayamón, Puerto Rico: (teams in **bold** advance to the semifinals, teams in italics advance to the quarterfinals)
  - Group A:
    - Canada 3–0 Trinidad and Tobago
    - Puerto Rico 1–3 **Dominican Republic**
      - Final standings: Dominican Republic 6 points, Puerto Rico 5, Canada 4, Trinidad&Tobago 3.
  - Group B:
    - **Cuba** 3–0 Mexico
    - United States 3–0 Costa Rica
      - Final standings: Cuba 6 points, USA 5, Mexico 4, Costa Rica 3.

==== Wrestling ====
- World Championships in Herning, Denmark:
  - Women:
    - 55 kg: (gold) Saori Yoshida (JPN) (silver) Sona Ahmedli (AZE) (bronze) Alena Filipava (BLR) & Tonya Verbeek (CAN)
    - 59 kg: (gold) Yuliya Ratkevich (AZE) (silver) Agata Pietrzyk (POL) (bronze) Marianna Sastin (HUN) & Ganna Vasylenko (UKR)
    - 63 kg: (gold) Mio Nishimaki (JPN) (silver) Lubov Volosova (RUS) (bronze) Yelena Shalygina (KAZ) & Justine Bouchard (CAN)

=== September 23, 2009 (Wednesday) ===
==== Baseball ====
- Major League Baseball:
  - Bobby Cox announces his retirement as manager of the Atlanta Braves at the end of the 2010 season. (AP via Google News)

==== Basketball ====
- WNBA Playoffs:
  - Eastern Conference Finals:
    - Game 1 at Auburn Hills, Michigan: (3) Detroit Shock 72, (1) Indiana Fever 56. **Shock lead best-of-3 series 1–0.**
  - Western Conference Finals:
    - Game 1 at Los Angeles: (1) Phoenix Mercury 103, (3) Los Angeles Sparks 94. **Mercury lead best-of-3 series 1–0.**
- NBA news:
  - Russian oligarch Mikhail Prokhorov announces a deal to purchase the New Jersey Nets and provide half of the funding for the team's planned new arena in Brooklyn. If approved by three-fourths of the league's other owners, he will become the first non-North American owner of an NBA team. (AP via ESPN)
- Asian Championship for Women in Chennai, India:
  - Semifinals: (winners qualify for 2010 World Championship)
    - **South Korea** 101–57 Japan
    - **China** 70–59 Chinese Taipei
- Americas Championship for Women in Cuiabá, Brazil:
  - Group A:
    - Dominican Republic 37–103 Canada
    - Puerto Rico 34–78 Brazil
  - Group B:
    - Chile 60–94 Cuba
    - Venezuela 65–87 Argentina

==== Cricket ====
- ICC Champions Trophy in South Africa:
  - Group A:
    - West Indies 133 (34.3 ov); Pakistan 134/5 (30.3 ov) at Johannesburg. **Pakistan win by 5 wickets**

==== Cycling ====
- Road World Championships in Mendrisio, Switzerland:
  - Individual time trials:
    - Men Under 23, 33.2 km: (gold) Jack Bobridge (AUS) 40' 44.79" (silver) Nelson Oliveira (POR) + 18.73" (bronze) Patrick Gretsch (GER) + 27.66"
    - Women, 26.8 km: (gold) Kristin Armstrong (USA) 35' 26.09" (silver) Noemi Cantele (ITA) + 55.01" (bronze) Linda Melanie Villumsen (DEN) + 58.25"
      - Armstrong, the reigning Olympic champion, wins the rainbow jersey for the second time.

==== Football (soccer) ====
- Copa Sudamericana Round of 16, first leg:
  - Vélez Sarsfield (Argentina) 3–2 (Chile) Unión Española
  - Alianza Atlético (Peru) 2–2 (Brazil) Fluminense
  - Internacional (Brazil) 1–1 Universidad de Chile
  - Botafogo (Brazil) 2–0 (Ecuador) Emelec
- AFC Champions League Quarter Finals, first leg:
  - Kawasaki Frontale (Japan) 2–1 (Japan) Nagoya Grampus
  - Bunyodkor (Uzbekistan) 3–1 (South Korea) Pohang Steelers
  - Umm-Salal (Qatar) 3–2 (South Korea) FC Seoul
- CONCACAF Champions League Group Stage, round 4:
  - Group B:
    - Toluca (Mexico) 3–0 (Trinidad and Tobago) San Juan Jabloteh
      - Standings: Toluca 12 points (4 matches), Marathón 6 (3), D.C. United 3 (3), San Juan Jabloteh 0 (4).
  - Group C:
    - Columbus Crew (United States) 0–2 (Mexico) Cruz Azul
      - Standings: Cruz Azul 10 points, Columbus Crew 6, C.D. Saprissa 4, Puerto Rico Islanders 2.
  - Group D:
    - Comunicaciones (Guatemala) 0–3 (Trinidad and Tobago) W Connection
      - Standings: UNAM 7 points (3 games), Comunicaciones 6 (4), W Connection 4 (4), Real España 3 (3).

==== Volleyball ====
- NORCECA Women's Championship in Bayamón, Puerto Rico: (teams in italics secure at least quarterfinal berths)
  - Group A:
    - Dominican Republic 3–0 Trinidad and Tobago
    - Canada 0–3 Puerto Rico
      - Standings: Dominican Republic, Puerto Rico 4 points, Canada, Trinidad&Tobago 2.
  - Group B:
    - Costa Rica 1–3 Mexico
    - United States 2–3 Cuba
      - Standings: Cuba 4 points, USA, Mexico 3, Costa Rica 2.

==== Wrestling ====
- World Championships in Herning, Denmark:
  - Men's freestyle:
    - 74 kg: (gold) Denis Tsargush (RUS) (silver) Chamsulvara Chamsulvarayev (AZE) (bronze) Ramesh Kumar (IND) & Sadegh Goudarzi (IRI)
  - Women:
    - 48 kg: (gold) Mariya Stadnik (AZE) (silver) Larisa Oorzhak (RUS) (bronze) So Sim-Hyang (PRK) & Lyudmyla Balushka (UKR)
    - 51 kg: (gold) Sofia Mattsson (SWE) (silver) Han Kum-Ok (PRK) (bronze) Oleksandra Kohut (UKR) & Yuri Kai (JPN)

=== September 22, 2009 (Tuesday) ===
==== Baseball ====
- Major League Baseball:
  - New York Yankees 6, Los Angeles Angels 5
  - Oakland Athletics 9, Texas Rangers 1
    - The Yankees become the first team to clinch a playoff berth.

==== Cricket ====
- ICC Champions Trophy in South Africa:
  - Group B:
    - Sri Lanka 319/8 (50 ov, Tillakaratne Dilshan 106); South Africa 206/7 (37.4/37.4 ov) at Centurion. **Sri Lanka win by 55 runs (D/L method)**

==== Football (soccer) ====
- Copa Sudamericana Round of 16, first leg:
  - River Plate (Uruguay) 4–1 (Brazil) Vitória
- CONCACAF Champions League Group Stage, round 4:
  - Group A:
    - Houston Dynamo (United States) 5–1 (Panama) Árabe Unido
    - Isidro Metapán (El Salvador) 0–4 (Mexico) Pachuca
      - Standings: Pachuca 9 points, Houston Dynamo, Árabe Unido 7, Isidro Metapán 0.
  - Group C:
    - Puerto Rico Islanders 1–1 (Costa Rica) Saprissa

==== Tennis ====
- Former world number 1 player Justine Henin announces that she is ending her year-long retirement from the sport. (AP via ESPN)

==== Volleyball ====
- NORCECA Women's Championship in Bayamón, Puerto Rico:
  - Group A:
    - Canada 0–3 Dominican Republic
    - Puerto Rico 3–0 Trinidad and Tobago
  - Group B:
    - United States 3–0 Mexico
    - Cuba 3–1 Costa Rica

==== Wrestling ====
- World Championships in Herning, Denmark:
  - Men's freestyle:
    - 60 kg: (gold) Besik Kudukhov (RUS) (silver) Zelimkhan Huseynov (AZE) (bronze) Dilshod Mansurov (UZB) & Vasyl Fedoryshyn (UKR)
    - 84 kg: (gold) Zaurbek Sokhiev (UZB) (silver) Jacob Herbert (USA) (bronze) Ibragim Aldatov (UKR) & Sharif Sharifov (AZE)
    - 120 kg: (gold) Beylal Makhov (RUS) (silver) Fardin Masoumi (IRI) (bronze) Ioannis Arzoumanidis (GRE) & Tervel Dlagnev (USA)

=== September 21, 2009 (Monday) ===
==== American football ====
- NFL Monday Night Football week 2:
  - Indianapolis Colts 27, Miami Dolphins 23
    - The Colts go to 2–0, with Peyton Manning throwing for 303 yards and two touchdowns, including the game-winner to Pierre Garçon with 3:18 left.

==== Auto racing ====
- The Fédération Internationale de l'Automobile gives a two-year suspended ban to the Renault F1 team for ordering Nelson Piquet Jr. to deliberately crash his vehicle during the 2008 Singapore Grand Prix. Renault F1 will pay for the investigation, and has sacked team principal Flavio Briatore, who has been banned from the sport by FIA.

==== Basketball ====
- WNBA Playoffs:
  - Western Conference first round:
    - Game 3: (1) Phoenix Mercury 100, (4) San Antonio Silver Stars 92 in Phoenix. Mercury win best-of-3 series 2–1.

==== Wrestling ====
- World Championships in Herning, Denmark:
  - Men's freestyle:
    - 55 kg: (gold) Yang Kyong-Il (PRK) (silver) Sezar Akgül (TUR) (bronze) Rizvan Gadzhiev (BLR) & Viktor Lebedev (RUS)
    - 66 kg: (gold) Mehdi Taghavi (IRI) (silver) Rasul Djukayev (RUS) (bronze) Tatsuhiro Yonemitsu (JPN) & Leonid Spiridonov (KAZ)
    - 96 kg: (gold) Khadjimourat Gatsalov (RUS) (silver) Khetag Gazyumov (AZE) (bronze) Serhat Balcı (TUR) & Georgi Gogshelidze (GEO)

=== September 20, 2009 (Sunday) ===
==== American football ====
- NFL week 2: (teams in **bold** have 2–0 record)
  - **Atlanta Falcons** 28, Carolina Panthers 20
    - Matt Ryan's three passing touchdowns trump Jake Delhomme's 308 yards through the air.
  - **Minnesota Vikings** 27, Detroit Lions 13
    - Brett Favre makes his 271st consecutive regular-season start, breaking the previous record of former Vikings great Jim Marshall.
  - Cincinnati Bengals 31, Green Bay Packers 24
  - Houston Texans 34, Tennessee Titans 31
    - Matt Schaub leads the Texans with 357 yards passing for four touchdowns.
  - Oakland Raiders 13, Kansas City Chiefs 10
  - **New York Jets** 16, New England Patriots 9
  - **New Orleans Saints** 48, Philadelphia Eagles 22
    - Drew Brees throws for 311 yards and three TDs to lead the Saints. Kevin Kolb, starting for the injured Donovan McNabb, throws for 391 yards in a losing effort.
  - Washington Redskins 9, St. Louis Rams 7
  - Arizona Cardinals 31, Jacksonville Jaguars 17
    - The Cardinals' Kurt Warner sets a new NFL record for completion percentage in a game, going 24-for-26.
  - Buffalo Bills 33, Tampa Bay Buccaneers 20
  - Chicago Bears 17, Pittsburgh Steelers 14
  - **Denver Broncos** 27, Cleveland Browns 6
  - **Baltimore Ravens** 31, San Diego Chargers 26
  - **San Francisco 49ers** 23, Seattle Seahawks 10
  - Sunday Night Football: **New York Giants** 33, Dallas Cowboys 31
    - The Giants spoil the Cowboys' regular-season debut at their new stadium, with Lawrence Tynes kicking a 37-yard field goal as time expires.

==== Athletics ====
- Berlin Marathon:
  - Men: (1) Haile Gebrselassie (ETH) 2hr 6min 8sec (2) Francis Kiprop (KEN) 2:07:04 (3) Negari Terfa (ETH) 2:07:41
    - Gebrselassie wins the race for the fourth straight year.
  - Women: (1) Atsede Habtamu Besuye (ETH) 2:24:47 (2) Silvia Skvortsova (RUS) 2:26:24 (3) Mamitu Daska (ETH) 2:26:38

==== Auto racing ====
- Chase for the Sprint Cup:
  - Sylvania 300 in Loudon, New Hampshire:
    - (1) Mark Martin (Arkansas) (Chevrolet, Hendrick Motorsports) (2) Denny Hamlin (Virginia) (Toyota, Joe Gibbs Racing) (3) Juan Pablo Montoya (Colombia) (Chevrolet, Earnhardt Ganassi Racing)
      - Drivers' standings (with 9 races remaining): (1) Martin 5230 points (2) Jimmie Johnson (California) 5195 (Chevrolet, Hendrick Motorsports) (3) Hamlin 5195

==== Badminton ====
- BWF Super Series:
  - China Masters Super Series in Changzhou: (seeding in parentheses)
    - Men's singles: Lin Dan (CHN) (4) bt Boonsak Ponsana (THA) (7) 21–17, 21–17
    - Women's singles: Wang Shixian (CHN) bt Wang Lin (CHN) (2) 21–14, 14–21, 21–14
    - Men's doubles: Guo Zhendong/Xu Chen (CHN) (7) bt Cai Yun/Fu Haifeng (CHN) (2) walkover
    - Women's doubles: Du Jing/Yu Yang (CHN) (3) bt Cheng Shu/Zhao Yunlei (CHN) (1) 21–15, 21–15
    - Mixed doubles: Tao Jiaming/Wang Xiaoli (CHN) bt Xie Zhongbo/Zhang Yawen (CHN) (3) 13–21, 21–19, 8–4 (ret)

==== Basketball ====
- EuroBasket in Katowice, Poland: (the top six teams plus the host Turkey qualify for 2010 World Championship)
  - 5th place game: France 69–62 Croatia
  - 7th place game: Turkey 66–89 Russia
  - Bronze medal game: (bronze) Greece 57–56 Slovenia
  - Final: (gold) Spain 85–63 (silver) Serbia
    - Spain win their first ever European title after losing in six previous finals.
- WNBA Playoffs:
  - Western Conference first round:
    - Game 3: (3) Los Angeles Sparks 75, (2) Seattle Storm 64 in Seattle. Sparks win best-of-3 series 2–1.

==== Cricket ====
- Australia in England:
  - 7th ODI in Chester-le-Street:
    - Australia 176 (45.5 ov, Graeme Swann 5/28); England 177/6 (40 ov). **England win by 4 wickets. Australia win the 7-match series 6–1.**

==== Cycling ====
- Vuelta a España:
  - Stage 21 – Rivas-Vaciamadrid to Madrid, 110 km: (1) André Greipel (GER) (Team Columbia–HTC) 3h 11' 55" (2) Daniele Bennati (ITA) (Liquigas) s.t. (3) Borut Božič (SLO) (Vacansoleil) s.t.
    - Greipel wins his fourth stage and the points classification.
  - Final general classification: (1) Alejandro Valverde (ESP) (Caisse d'Epargne) 87h 22' 37" (2) Samuel Sánchez (ESP) (Euskaltel–Euskadi) + 55" (3) Cadel Evans (AUS) (Silence–Lotto) + 1' 32"

==== Football (soccer) ====
- CAF Champions League group stage, round 6: (teams in **bold** advance to the semifinals)
  - Group B:
    - Monomotapa United (Zimbabwe) 2–1 (Nigeria) **Heartland**
    - **TP Mazembe** (Democratic Republic of the Congo) 1–0 (Tunisia) Étoile du Sahel
      - Final standings: TP Mazembe 12 points, Heartland 10, Étoile du Sahel 7, Monomotapa United 6.
      - Semifinal matchups: TP Mazembe vs Al-Hilal, Kano Pillars vs Heartland

==== Gaelic football ====
- All-Ireland SFC Final in Dublin:
  - Cork 1-09 (12) – 0–16 (16) **Kerry** (RTÉ) (The Irish Times)
    - Kerry win their 36th All-Ireland SFC title. Tadhg Kennelly becomes the first player to collect winner's medals in both the Senior Football Championship and the Australian Football League, having previously won the AFL premiership with Sydney Swans in 2005.

==== Golf ====
- European Tour:
  - Bank Austria GolfOpen in Oberwaltersdorf, Austria:
    - Winner: Rafael Cabrera-Bello (ESP) 264 (−20)
      - Cabrera-Bello ties a European Tour record with a final-round 60 and edges out Benn Barham (ENG) by one shot.
- LPGA Tour:
  - Samsung World Championship in La Jolla, California:
    - Winner: Na Yeon Choi (KOR) 272 (−16)
      - Choi wins her first LPGA Tour title by one shot over Ai Miyazato (JPN).

==== Professional wrestling ====
- Total Nonstop Action Wrestling (TNA) held their fifth annual No Surrender pay-per-view event.
  - Sarita and Taylor Wilde defeated The Beautiful People (Madison Rayne and Velvet Sky) to become the first TNA Knockout Tag Team Champions
  - ODB defeated Cody Deaner to win the vacant TNA Women's Knockout Championship
  - A.J. Styles defeated the previous champion, Kurt Angle, Sting, Matt Morgan, and Hernandez to win the TNA World Heavyweight Championship.

==== Rugby league ====
- Super League playoffs:
  - Elimination Play Off 2 in Wigan
    - Wigan Warriors 18–12 Castleford Tigers
      - Wigan will play at Hull Kingston Rovers in the preliminary semifinal; Castleford is eliminated.

==== Table tennis ====
- European Championships in Stuttgart, Germany:
  - Men's singles: Michael Maze (DEN) bt Werner Schlager (AUT) 4–1
  - Men's doubles: Timo Boll/Christian Süß (GER) bt Wang Zeng Yi/Lucjan Blasczyk (POL) 4–2
  - Women's singles: Wu Jiaduo (GER) bt Margaryta Pesotska (UKR) 4–0
  - Women's doubles: Elizabeta Samara/Daniela Dodean (ROU) bt Nikoleta Stefanova/Tan Wenling (ITA) 4–0

==== Tennis ====
- Davis Cup:
  - World Group semifinals, day 3:
    - Croatia 1–4 **Czech Republic** in Poreč
      - Jan Hájek (CZE) bt Roko Karanušić (CRO) 7–6(4), 6–4
      - Lovro Zovko (CRO) bt Lukáš Dlouhý (CZE) 6–3, 6–4
    - **Spain** 4–1 Israel in Murcia
      - David Ferrer (ESP) bt Andy Ram (ISR) 6–3, 6–1
      - Harel Levy (ISR) bt Feliciano López (ESP) 7–5, 6–2
  - World Group play-offs, day 3: (winners will play in 2010 Davis Cup World Group, losers will play in Zonal groups)
    - **Chile** 3–2 Austria in Rancagua
      - Jürgen Melzer (AUT) bt Paul Capdeville (CHI) 7–6(2), 4–6, 6–2, 5–7, 6–4
      - Nicolás Massú (CHI) bt Stefan Koubek (AUT) 6–4, 4–6, 6–4, 7–6(6)
        - Chile retain their place in the World Group, while Austria are relegated to Zonal Group 1 after six years in the top division.
    - **Belgium** 3–2 Ukraine in Charleroi
      - Sergiy Stakhovsky (UKR) bt Xavier Malisse (BEL) 6–3, 3–6, 0–6, 6–1, 6–3
      - Steve Darcis (BEL) bt Sergey Bubka (UKR) 6–2, 6–1, 6–0
        - Belgium advance back to the World Group after one-year absence, and deny Ukraine their first ever opportunity to reach the top level.
    - Brazil 2–3 **Ecuador** in Porto Alegre
      - Nicolás Lapentti (ECU) bt Marcos Daniel (BRA) 6–4, 6–4, 1–6, 2–6, 8–6
      - Thomaz Bellucci (BRA) bt Julio César Campozano (ECU) 6–2, 6–4
        - Ecuador win sixth successive tie and reach the World Group for the first time since 2001, while Brazil lose in the play-offs for the fourth straight year.
    - Netherlands 1–4 **France** in Maastricht
      - Jo-Wilfried Tsonga (FRA) bt Thiemo de Bakker (NED) 7–6(5), 6–2, 3–6, 7–6(4)
      - Jérémy Chardy (FRA) bt Jesse Huta Galung (NED) 6–3, 6–2
        - France remain in the World Group for the 12th straight year, while Netherlands are relegated to Zonal Group 1 after one year in the top flight.
    - South Africa 1–4 **India** in Johannesburg
      - Somdev Devvarman (IND) bt Rik de Voest (RSA) 3–6, 6–7(3), 7–6(5), 6–2, 6–4
      - Yuki Bhambri (IND) bt Izak van der Merwe (RSA) 3–6, 6–3, 6–4
        - India advance to the World Group for the first time since 1998, and deny South Africa, that won 10 consecutive ties before this one, from doing exactly the same.
    - **Serbia** 5–0 Uzbekistan in Belgrade
      - Viktor Troicki (SRB) bt Murad Inoyatov (UZB) 4–6, 6–4, 6–3
      - Ilija Bozoljac (SRB) bt Vaja Uzakov (UZB) 6–1, 6–4
        - Serbia stay in the World Group for the third straight year, while Uzbekistan fail to advance to the top level for the first time.
    - **Sweden** 3–2 Romania in Helsingborg
      - Robin Söderling (SWE) bt Victor Hănescu (ROU) 7–5, 6–1, 6–0
      - Marius Copil (ROU) bt Andreas Vinciguerra (SWE) 4–6 retired
        - Sweden retain their World Group status for the tenth successive year, while Romania are relegated to Zonal Group 1 for the first time since 2002.
    - Italy 2–3 **Switzerland** in Genoa
      - Roger Federer (SUI) bt Potito Starace (ITA) 6–3, 6–0, 6–4
        - Federer extends his winning streak in Davis Cup singles matches to 12, and keeps Switzerland in the World Group; Italy's absence from the World Group is extended to 10 years.
      - Fabio Fognini (ITA) bt Michael Lammer (SUI) 7–5, 7–6(4)
- WTA Tour:
  - Guangzhou International Women's Open in Guangzhou, China:
    - Final: **Shahar Pe'er** (ISR) (5) bt Alberta Brianti (ITA) (8) 6–3, 6–4
      - Pe'er wins her first title in three years and her fourth WTA Tour title overall. Brianti reach her first WTA Tour final.
  - Bell Challenge in Quebec City, Canada:
    - Final: **Melinda Czink** (HUN) (5) vs. Lucie Šafářová (CZE) (4) 4–6, 6–3, 7–5
      - Czink wins her first WTA Tour title.

=== September 19, 2009 (Saturday) ===
==== American football ====
- NCAA
  - AP Top 10:
    - (1) Florida 23, Tennessee 13
    - (2) Texas 34, Texas Tech 24
    - Washington 16, (3) USC 13
      - The Huskies, winless last season, stun the Trojans in Seattle, with Erik Folk kicking a winning 22-yard field goal with 3 seconds left.
    - (4) Alabama 53, North Texas 7
    - (5) Mississippi 52, Southeastern Louisiana 6
    - (5) Penn State 31, Temple 6
    - Florida State 54, (7) Brigham Young 28
    - (8) California 35, Minnesota 21
      - Jahvid Best runs for 131 yards and all five of the Bears' touchdowns.
    - (9) LSU 31, Louisiana–Lafayette 3
  - Other games:
    - (13) Virginia Tech 16, (19) Nebraska 15
      - Tyrod Taylor's 11-yard TD pass to Dyrell Roberts with 21 seconds left gives the Hokies the home win.
    - Oregon 31, (18) Utah 24

==== Australian rules football ====
- AFL finals series:
  - Preliminary final 2 at the MCG, Melbourne:
    - **Geelong** 17.18 (120)–6.11 (47) Collingwood
      - Geelong, after outscoring their opponents 71–9 in the second half, will play against St Kilda in the Grand Final on September 26.

==== Auto racing ====
- IndyCar Series:
  - Indy Japan 300 in Motegi, Japan:
    - (1) Scott Dixon (NZL) (Chip Ganassi Racing) (2) Dario Franchitti (GBR) (Chip Ganassi Racing) (3) Graham Rahal (USA) (Newman/Haas/Lanigan Racing)
      - Drivers' standings (after 16 of 17 races): (1) Dixon 570 points (2) Franchitti 565 (3) Ryan Briscoe (AUS) (Penske Racing) 562

==== Basketball ====
- EuroBasket in Katowice, Poland:
  - Classification 5–8: (winners qualify for 2010 World Championship)
    - **France** 80–68 Turkey
    - Russia 69–76 **Croatia**
  - Semifinals:
    - **Spain** 82–64 Greece
      - Spain advance to the final for the seventh time.
    - **Serbia** 96–92 (OT) Slovenia
      - Serbia advance to the final for the fourth time, the first since 2001.
- WNBA Playoffs:
  - Eastern Conference first round:
    - Game 2: (1) Indiana Fever 81, (4) Washington Mystics 74 (OT) in Indianapolis. Fever win best-of-3 series 2–0.
  - Western Conference first round:
    - Game 2: (1) Phoenix Mercury 106, (4) San Antonio Silver Stars 78 in Phoenix. Best-of-3 series tied 1–1.

==== Boxing ====
- Floyd Mayweather Jr. vs. Juan Manuel Márquez card at Las Vegas:
  - Floyd Mayweather Jr. (USA) def. Juan Manuel Márquez (MEX) via unanimous decision.
    - Mayweather comes back from a 21-month retirement to extend his unbeaten record to 40–0 and retain the WBC and The Ring welterweight titles.
  - Chris John (INA) def. Rocky Juarez (USA) via unanimous decision to retain the WBA featherweight title.
  - Michael Katsidis (AUS) def. Vicente Escobedo (USA) via split decision in a lightweight bout.
  - Cornelius Lock (USA) knocked out Orlando Cruz (PUR) in the fifth round in a featherweight bout.
  - Erislandy Lara (CUB) knocked out Jose Varela (USA) in the first round in a junior middleweight bout.

==== Cycling ====
- Vuelta a España:
  - Stage 20 – Toledo, 26 km (ITT): (1) David Millar (GBR) (Garmin–Slipstream) 35' 53" (2) Samuel Sánchez (ESP) (Euskaltel–Euskadi) + 5" (3) Cadel Evans (AUS) (Silence–Lotto) + 9"
  - General classification: (1) Alejandro Valverde (ESP) (Caisse d'Epargne) 84h 10' 32" (2) Sánchez + 55" (3) Evans + 1' 32"

==== Football (soccer) ====
- CAF Champions League group stage, round 6: (teams in **bold** advance to the semifinals)
  - Group A:
    - ZESCO United (Zambia) 2–0 (Sudan) **Al-Hilal**
    - Al-Merreikh (Sudan) 1–1 (Nigeria) **Kano Pillars**
      - Final standings: Kano Pillars 11 points, Al-Hilal 10, ZESCO United 8, Al-Merreikh 3.

==== Rugby league ====
- NRL Finals Series:
  - Semifinal in Brisbane: (winner advances to preliminary final, loser eliminated)
    - **Brisbane Broncos** 24–10 St George Illawarra Dragons
- Super League playoffs:
  - Qualifying Play Off 2 in St. Helens:
    - **St. Helens** 15–2 Huddersfield Giants
      - The Saints advance to the qualifying semi-finals.
  - Elimination Playoff 1 in Wakefield:
    - Wakefield Trinity Wildcats 16–25 **Catalans Dragons**
      - The Dragons will play against Huddersfield in the preliminary semi-finals; the Wildcats are eliminated.

==== Rugby union ====
- Tri Nations Series:
  - New Zealand 33–6 Australia in Wellington
    - Final standings: South Africa 21 points, New Zealand 13, Australia 7.

==== Tennis ====
- Davis Cup:
  - World Group semifinals, day 2:
    - Croatia 0–3 **Czech Republic** in Poreč
      - Tomáš Berdych/Radek Štěpánek (CZE) Roko Karanušić/Lovro Zovko (CRO) 6–1, 6–3, 6–4
        - The Czech Republic advance to the final for the third time overall and the first as a separate state, with their previous final appearance being in 1980 as Czechoslovakia.
    - **Spain** 3–0 Israel in Murcia
      - Feliciano López/Tommy Robredo (ESP) bt Jonathan Erlich/Andy Ram (ISR) 7–6(6), 6–7(7), 6–4, 6–2
        - Defending champions Spain reach the final for the second straight year and the seventh time in their history, five of them are in the last decade. Spain's win over Israel is their 17th straight home victory.
  - World Group play-offs, day 2: (winners will play in 2010 Davis Cup World Group, losers will play in Zonal groups)
    - Chile 2–1 Austria in Rancagua
      - Julian Knowle/Jürgen Melzer (AUT) bt Paul Capdeville/Nicolás Massú (CHI) 6–2, 6–4, 6–3
    - Belgium 2–1 Ukraine in Charleroi
      - Sergey Bubka/Sergiy Stakhovsky (UKR) bt Olivier Rochus/Xavier Malisse (BEL) 7–6 (5), 3–6, 6–4, 7–6 (7)
    - Brazil 1–2 Ecuador in Porto Alegre
      - Giovanni Lapentti/Nicolás Lapentti (ECU) bt Marcelo Melo/André Sá (BRA) 3–6, 6–3, 6–4, 4–6, 6–4
    - Netherlands 1–2 France in Maastricht
      - Jo-Wilfried Tsonga/Michaël Llodra (FRA) bt Thiemo de Bakker/Igor Sijsling (NED) 6–3, 3–6, 7–6 (2), 6–4
    - South Africa 1–2 India in Johannesburg
      - Jeff Coetzee/Wesley Moodie (RSA) bt Mahesh Bhupathi/Rohan Bopanna (IND) 6–3, 3–6, 4–0 – Retired
    - **Serbia** 3–0 Uzbekistan in Belgrade
      - Janko Tipsarević/Nenad Zimonjić (SRB) bt Farrukh Dustov/Denis Istomin (UZB) 6–2, 6–3, 6–2
    - Sweden 2–1 Romania in Helsingborg
      - Robert Lindstedt/Robin Söderling (SWE) bt Victor Hănescu/Horia Tecău (ROM) 6–1, 7–6 (7), 7–6 (5)
    - Italy 1–2 Switzerland in Genoa
      - Simone Bolelli/Potito Starace (ITA) bt Marco Chiudinelli/Stanislas Wawrinka (SUI) 6–2, 6–4, 7–6(3)

=== September 18, 2009 (Friday) ===
==== American football ====
- NCAA AP Top 10:
  - Milk Can: (10) Boise State 51, Fresno State 34

==== Australian rules football ====
- AFL finals series:
  - Preliminary final 1 at the MCG, Melbourne:
    - **St Kilda** 9.6 (60)–7.11 (53) Western Bulldogs

==== Basketball ====
- EuroBasket in Katowice, Poland: (winners qualify for 2010 World Championship)
  - Quarterfinals:
    - Turkey 74–76 (OT) **Greece**
    - **Slovenia** 67–65 Croatia
      - Slovenia advance to the semifinals for the first time.
- WNBA Playoffs:
  - Eastern Conference first round:
    - Game 2: (3) Detroit Shock 94, (2) Atlanta Dream 79 in Duluth, Georgia. Shock win best-of-3 series 2–0
  - Western Conference first round:
    - Game 2: (2) Seattle Storm 75, (3) Los Angeles Sparks 74 in Seattle. Best-of-3 series tied 1–1.

==== Cycling ====
- Vuelta a España:
  - Stage 19 – Ávila to La Granja de San Ildefonso, 175 km: (1) Juan José Cobo (ESP) (Fuji–Servetto) 4h 37' 35" (2) Alejandro Valverde (ESP) (Caisse d'Epargne) + 2" (3) Cadel Evans (AUS) (Silence–Lotto) s.t.
  - General classification: (1) Valverde 83h 34' 03" (2) Samuel Sánchez (ESP) (Euskaltel–Euskadi) + 1' 26" (3) Ivan Basso (ITA) (Liquigas) + 1' 45"

==== Rugby league ====
- NRL Finals Series:
  - Semifinal in Sydney: (winner advances to preliminary final, loser eliminated)
    - **Parramatta Eels** 27–2 Gold Coast Titans
- Super League playoffs:
  - Qualifying Play Off 1 in Leeds:
    - **Leeds Rhinos** 44–8 Hull Kingston Rovers
      - The Rhinos, two-time defending champions and this season's league leaders, will now receive their choice of opponent in the qualifying semi-finals in two weeks' time.

==== Tennis ====
- Davis Cup:
  - World Group semifinals, day 1:
    - Croatia 0–2 Czech Republic in Poreč
      - Radek Štěpánek (CZE) bt Ivo Karlović (CRO) 6–7 (5), 7–6 (5), 7–6 (5), 6–7 (2), 16–14
        - Štěpánek saves 5 match points and overcomes a world record of 78 aces by Karlović, to win after 82 games – equalling the Davis cup record since the introduction of the tie-break, and 5 hours 59 minutes – the fourth longest match in Davis Cup history.
      - Tomáš Berdych (CZE) bt Marin Čilić (CRO) 6–3, 6–3, 3–6, 4–6, 6–3
    - Spain 2–0 Israel in Murcia
      - David Ferrer (ESP) bt Harel Levy (ISR) 6–1, 6–4, 6–3
      - Juan Carlos Ferrero (ESP) bt Dudi Sela (ISR) 6–4, 6–2, 6–0
  - World Group play-offs, day 1:
    - Chile 2–0 Austria in Rancagua
      - Nicolás Massú (CHI) bt Jürgen Melzer (AUT) 4–6, 6–4, 6–4, 6–3
      - Paul Capdeville (CHI) bt Stefan Koubek (AUT) 6–4, 6–4, 3–6, 1–6, 6–4
    - Belgium 2–0 Ukraine in Charleroi
      - Christophe Rochus (BEL) bt Illya Marchenko (UKR) 6–3, 6–4, 3–6, 6–2
      - Steve Darcis (BEL) bt Sergiy Stakhovsky (UKR) 6–2, 6–3, 6–4
    - Brazil 1–1 Ecuador in Porto Alegre
      - Marcos Daniel (BRA) bt Giovanni Lapentti (ECU) 7–6 (3), 3–6, 7–6 (4), 6–2
      - Nicolás Lapentti (ECU) bt Thomaz Bellucci (BRA) 7–6 (2), 6–4, 7–5
    - Netherlands 1–1 France in Maastricht
      - Thiemo de Bakker (NED) bt Gaël Monfils (FRA) 6–3, 5–7, 6–3, 6–4
      - Jo-Wilfried Tsonga (FRA) bt Jesse Huta Galung (NED) 7–6 (2), 6–2, 7–6 (3)
    - South Africa 0–2 India in Johannesburg
      - Somdev Devvarman (IND) bt Izak van der Merwe (RSA) 7–6 (5), 6–3, 6–4
      - Rohan Bopanna (IND) bt Rik de Voest (RSA) 2–6, 6–4, 6–2, 6–4
    - Serbia 2–0 Uzbekistan in Belgrade
      - Janko Tipsarević (SRB) bt Denis Istomin (UZB) 6–2, 5–7, 6–1, 6–4
      - Viktor Troicki (SRB) bt Farrukh Dustov (UZB) 6–4, 3–6, 6–3, 4–6, 6–2
    - Sweden 1–1 Romania in Helsingborg
      - Victor Hănescu (ROM) bt Andreas Vinciguerra (SWE) 7–6 (5), 7–6 (10) – retired
      - Robin Söderling (SWE) bt Victor Crivoi (ROM) 6–2, 6–1, 7–5
    - Italy 0–2 Switzerland in Genoa
      - Stanislas Wawrinka (SUI) bt Andreas Seppi (ITA) 6–4, 6–1, 6–2
      - Roger Federer (SUI) bt Simone Bolelli (ITA) 6–3, 6–4, 6–1

=== September 17, 2009 (Thursday) ===
==== American football ====
- NCAA AP Top 25:
  - (20) Miami 33, (14) Georgia Tech 17

==== Basketball ====
- EuroBasket in Katowice, Poland: (winners qualify for 2010 World Championship)
  - Quarterfinals:
    - Russia 68–79 **Serbia**
    - France 66–86 **Spain**
- WNBA Playoffs:
  - Eastern Conference first round:
    - Game 1: (1) Indiana Fever 88, (4) Washington Mystics 79 in College Park, Maryland. Fever lead best-of-3 series 1–0.
  - Western Conference first round:
    - Game 1: (4) San Antonio Silver Stars 92, (1) Phoenix Mercury 91 in San Antonio. Silver Stars lead best-of-3 series 1–0.

==== Cricket ====
- Australia in England:
  - 6th ODI in Nottingham:
    - Australia 296/8 (50 ov, Tim Paine 111); England 185 (41.0 ov). **Australia win by 111 runs. Australia lead the 7-match series 6–0.**

==== Cycling ====
- Vuelta a España:
  - Stage 18 – Talavera de la Reina to Ávila, 175 km: (1) Philip Deignan (IRL) (Cervélo TestTeam) 4h 19' 14" (2) Roman Kreuziger (CZE) (Liquigas) + 3" (3) Jakob Fuglsang (DEN) (Team Saxo Bank) + 16"
  - General classification: (1) Alejandro Valverde (ESP) (Caisse d'Epargne) 78h 56' 42" (2) Robert Gesink (NED) (Rabobank) + 32' (3) Samuel Sánchez (ESP) (Euskaltel–Euskadi) + 1' 10"

==== Football (soccer) ====
- UEFA Europa League group stage, Matchday 1:
  - Group A:
    - Ajax (Netherlands) 0–0 (Romania) Timişoara
    - Dinamo Zagreb (Croatia) 0–2 (Belgium) Anderlecht
  - Group B:
    - Lille (France) 1–1 (Spain) Valencia
    - Genoa (Italy) 2–0 (Czech Republic) Slavia Prague
  - Group C:
    - Hapoel Tel Aviv (Israel) 2–1 (Scotland) Celtic
    - Rapid Wien (Austria) 3–0 (Germany) Hamburg
  - Group D:
    - Hertha BSC (Germany) 1–1 (Latvia) Ventspils
    - Heerenveen (Netherlands) 2–3 (Portugal) Sporting CP
  - Group E:
    - CSKA Sofia (Bulgaria) 1–1 (England) Fulham
    - Basel (Switzerland) 2–0 (Italy) Roma
  - Group F:
    - Panathinaikos (Greece) 1–3 (Turkey) Galatasaray
    - Sturm Graz (Austria) 0–1 (Romania) Dinamo București
  - Group G:
    - Lazio (Italy) 1–2 (Austria) Red Bull Salzburg
    - Villarreal (Spain) 1–0 (Bulgaria) Levski Sofia
  - Group H:
    - Steaua București (Romania) 0–0 (Moldova) Sheriff Tiraspol
    - Fenerbahçe (Turkey) 1–2 (Netherlands) Twente
  - Group I:
    - Benfica (Portugal) 2–0 (Belarus) BATE Borisov
    - Everton (England) 4–0 (Greece) AEK Athens
  - Group J:
    - Club Brugge (Belgium) 1–4 (Ukraine) Shakhtar Donetsk
    - Partizan (Serbia) 2–3 (France) Toulouse
  - Group K:
    - Sparta Prague (Czech Republic) 2–2 (Netherlands) PSV Eindhoven
    - CFR Cluj (Romania) 2–0 (Denmark) Copenhagen
  - Group L:
    - Athletic Bilbao (Spain) 3–0 Austria Wien
    - Nacional (Portugal) 2–3 (Germany) Werder Bremen
- Copa Sudamericana First Stage, second leg: (first leg score in parentheses)
  - **Lanús** (Argentina) 1–0 (2–1) (Argentina) River Plate. Lanús win 3–1 on aggregate.
- CONCACAF Champions League Group Stage, round 3:
  - Group B:
    - Toluca (Mexico) 7–0 (Honduras) Marathón
      - Standings: Toluca 9 points, Marathón 6, D.C. United 3, San Juan Jabloteh 0.
  - Group D:
    - Comunicaciones (Guatemala) 2–0 (Honduras) Real España
      - Standings: UNAM 7 points, Comunicaciones 6, Real España 3, W Connection 1.

==== Snooker ====
- Premier League Snooker – League phase in Great Malvern:
  - Shaun Murphy (ENG) 2–4 John Higgins (SCO)
  - Stephen Hendry (SCO) 2–4 Judd Trump (ENG)
    - Standings: Ronnie O'Sullivan, Neil Robertson, Judd Trump, John Higgins 2 points; Stephen Hendry, Marco Fu, Shaun Murphy 0.

=== September 16, 2009 (Wednesday) ===
==== Basketball ====
- EuroBasket in Poland: (teams in **bold** advance to the quarterfinals)
  - Group F in Łódź:
    - Lithuania 79–89 **Serbia**
    - Poland 68–90 **Spain**
    - **Turkey** 67–69 **Slovenia**
      - Final standings: Slovenia, Turkey 9 points, Serbia, Spain 8, Poland 6, Lithuania 5.
- WNBA Playoffs:
  - Eastern Conference first round:
    - Game 1: (3) Detroit Shock 94, (2) Atlanta Dream 89 in Auburn Hills, Michigan. Shock lead best-of-3 series 1–0.
  - Western Conference first round:
    - Game 1: (3) Los Angeles Sparks 70, (2) Seattle Storm 63 in Los Angeles. Sparks lead best-of-3 series 1–0.

==== Cycling ====
- Vuelta a España:
  - Stage 17 – Ciudad Real to Talavera de la Reina, 175 km: (1) Anthony Roux (FRA) (Française des Jeux) 4h 28' 14" (2) William Bonnet (FRA) (Bbox Bouygues Telecom) + 0" (3) André Greipel (GER) (Team Columbia–HTC) + 0"
  - General classification: (1) Alejandro Valverde (ESP) (Caisse d'Epargne) 74h 27' 48" (2) Robert Gesink (NED) (Rabobank) + 31' (3) Samuel Sánchez (ESP) (Euskaltel–Euskadi) + 1' 10"

==== Football (soccer) ====
- UEFA Champions League group stage, Matchday 1:
  - Group E:
    - Liverpool (England) 1–0 (Hungary) Debrecen
    - Lyon (France) 1–0 (Italy) Fiorentina
  - Group F:
    - Internazionale (Italy) 0–0 (Spain) Barcelona
    - Dynamo Kyiv (Ukraine) 3–1 (Russia) Rubin Kazan
  - Group G:
    - Stuttgart (Germany) 1–1 (Scotland) Rangers
    - Sevilla (Spain) 2–0 (Romania) Unirea Urziceni
  - Group H:
    - Olympiacos (Greece) 1–0 (Netherlands) AZ
    - Standard Liège (Belgium) 2–3 (England) Arsenal
- Copa Sudamericana First Stage, second leg: (first leg score in parentheses)
  - **Goiás** (Brazil) 1–1 (1–1) (Brazil) Atlético Mineiro. 2–2 on aggregate, Goiás win 6–5 on penalty shootout.
  - **Botafogo** (Brazil) 3–2 (0–0) (Brazil) Atlético Paranaense. Botafogo win 3–2 on aggregate.
  - **Vélez Sarsfield** (Argentina) 1–0 (1–1) (Argentina) Boca Juniors. Vélez Sarsfield win 2–1 on aggregate.
- CONCACAF Champions League Group Stage, round 3:
  - Group A:
    - Pachuca (Mexico) 2–0 (United States) Houston Dynamo
      - Standings: Árabe Unido 7 points, Pachuca 6, Houston Dynamo 4, Isidro Metapán 0.
  - Group C:
    - Saprissa (Costa Rica) 0–1 (United States) Columbus Crew
      - Standings: Cruz Azul 7 points, Columbus Crew 6, Saprissa 3, Puerto Rico Islanders 1.
  - Group D:
    - W Connection (Trinidad and Tobago) 2–2 (Mexico) UNAM
      - Standings: UNAM 7 points, Comunicaciones, Real España 3 (2 matches), W Connection 1.

=== September 15, 2009 (Tuesday) ===
==== Basketball ====
- EuroBasket in Poland: (teams in **bold** advance to the quarterfinals)
  - Group E in Bydgoszcz:
    - **Russia** 71–69 North Macedonia
    - **France** 71–69 **Greece**
    - Germany 68–70 **Croatia**
      - Final standings: France 10 points, Russia, Greece 8, Croatia 7, Germany, Macedonia 6.

==== Cricket ====
- Australia in England:
  - 5th ODI in Nottingham:
    - England 299 (50 ov); Australia 302/6 (48.2 ov, Ricky Ponting 126). **Australia win by 4 wickets. Australia lead the 7-match series 5–0**.

==== Cycling ====
- Vuelta a España:
  - Stage 16 – Córdoba to Puertollano, 170 km: (1) André Greipel (GER) (Team Columbia–HTC) 4h 50' 44" (2) William Bonnet (FRA) (Bbox Bouygues Telecom) + 0" (3) Daniele Bennati (ITA) (Liquigas) + 0"
    - Greipel wins his third stage of this Vuelta and takes the lead in the points classification.
  - General classification: (1) Alejandro Valverde (ESP) (Caisse d'Epargne) 69h 59' 34" (2) Robert Gesink (NED) (Rabobank) + 31' (3) Samuel Sánchez (ESP) (Euskaltel–Euskadi) + 1' 10"

==== Football (soccer) ====
- UEFA Champions League group stage, Matchday 1:
  - Group A:
    - Juventus (Italy) 1–1 (France) Bordeaux
    - Maccabi Haifa (Israel) 0–3 (Germany) Bayern Munich
  - Group B:
    - Wolfsburg (Germany) 3–1 (Russia) CSKA Moscow
    - Beşiktaş (Turkey) 0–1 (England) Manchester United
  - Group C:
    - Zürich (Switzerland) 2–5 (Spain) Real Madrid
    - Marseille (France) 1–2 (Italy) Milan
  - Group D:
    - Chelsea (England) 1–0 (Portugal) Porto
    - Atlético Madrid (Spain) 0–0 (Cyprus) APOEL
- Copa Sudamericana First Stage, second leg: (first leg score in parentheses)
  - **San Lorenzo** (Argentina) 1–0 (1–2) (Argentina) Tigre. 2–2 on aggregate, San Lorenzo win on away goals rule.
  - Deportivo Anzoátegui (Venezuela) 1–2 (0–0) (Peru) **Alianza Atlético**. Alianza Atlético win 2–1 on aggregate.
- CONCACAF Champions League Group Stage, round 3:
  - Group A:
    - Isidro Metapán (El Salvador) 0–1 (Panama) Árabe Unido
  - Group B:
    - San Juan Jabloteh (Trinidad and Tobago) 0–1 (United States) D.C. United
  - Group C:
    - Puerto Rico Islanders 3–3 (Mexico) Cruz Azul

=== September 14, 2009 (Monday) ===
==== American football ====
- NFL Monday Night Football week 1:
  - New England Patriots 25, Buffalo Bills 24
    - Tom Brady throws for 378 yards and brings the Pats back from a late 24–13 deficit, connecting with Benjamin Watson on two touchdown passes in the final 2:10.
  - San Diego Chargers 24, Oakland Raiders 20
    - After the Raiders take a late lead, Philip Rivers leads the Chargers on a 79-yard drive, capped off by a 5-yard TD run from Darren Sproles with 18 seconds left.

==== Basketball ====
- EuroBasket in Poland: (teams in **bold** advance to the quarterfinals)
  - Group F in Łódź:
    - Spain 84–70 Lithuania
      - Lithuania fails to reach the top 8 for only the second time in 10 championships.
    - **Slovenia** 76–60 Poland
    - **Serbia** 64–69 (OT) **Turkey**
      - Turkey shutout Serbia 5–0 in overtime.
      - Standings (after 4 games): Turkey 8 points, Slovenia 7, Serbia, Spain 6, Poland 5, Lithuania 4.

==== Cricket ====
- Tri-series in Sri Lanka:
  - Final in Colombo:
    - India 319/5 (50 ov, Sachin Tendulkar 138); Sri Lanka 273 (46.4 ov). **India win by 46 runs**.

==== Cycling ====
- Vuelta a España:
  - Stage 15 – Jaén to Córdoba, 168 km: (1) Lars Boom (NED) (Rabobank) 4h 12' 56" (2) David Herrero (ESP) (Xacobeo–Galicia) + 1' 36" (3) Dominik Roels (GER) (Team Milram) + 1' 44"
  - General classification: (1) Alejandro Valverde (ESP) (Caisse d'Epargne) 65h 08' 50" (2) Robert Gesink (NED) (Rabobank) + 31' (3) Samuel Sánchez (ESP) (Euskaltel–Euskadi) + 1' 10"

==== Rugby union ====
- SANZAR, the organising body of the Tri Nations and Super 14 competitions, announces that Argentina has provisionally been invited to join an expanded Tri Nations effective in 2012. (International Rugby Board)

==== Tennis ====
- US Open, day 15: (seeding in parentheses)
  - Men's singles, final:
    - **Juan Martín del Potro (ARG)** [6] def. Roger Federer (SUI) [1] 3–6, 7–6(5), 4–6, 7–6(4), 6–2
      - Del Potro wins his first Grand Slam tournament and stops Federer's streak of US Open titles at five. Del Potro also becomes the second Argentine to win the US Open men's singles after Guillermo Vilas in 1977, and the first ever South American to win a Grand Slam men's event on a hard court. His win also stops a streak of 21 Grand Slam men's titles won by European players since fellow Argentine Gastón Gaudio won the 2004 French Open.
  - Women's doubles, final:
    - **Serena Williams (USA) / Venus Williams (USA)** [4] def. Cara Black (ZIM) / Liezel Huber (USA) [1] 6–2, 6–2
      - The Williams sisters win their second US Open doubles title and their tenth Grand Slam tournament.

=== September 13, 2009 (Sunday) ===
==== American football ====
- NFL week 1:
  - Atlanta Falcons 19, Miami Dolphins 7
  - Baltimore Ravens 38, Kansas City Chiefs 24
    - Joe Flacco throws for 307 yards and three touchdowns.
  - Philadelphia Eagles 38, Carolina Panthers 10
    - The Eagles win with defense, forcing seven Panthers turnovers, five of them by quarterback Jake Delhomme, but lose Donovan McNabb to a broken rib.
  - Indianapolis Colts 14, Jacksonville Jaguars 12
  - Dallas Cowboys 34, Tampa Bay Buccaneers 21
    - Tony Romo throws for 353 yards and three touchdowns.
  - New Orleans Saints 45, Detroit Lions 27
    - Drew Brees throws for 358 yards and six TDs to lead the Saints.
  - New York Jets 24, Houston Texans 7
  - Minnesota Vikings 34, Cleveland Browns 20
    - Brett Favre wins in his Vikings debut, led by Adrian Peterson, who runs for 180 yards and three TDs.
  - Denver Broncos 12, Cincinnati Bengals 7
    - Brandon Stokley catches a tipped desperation pass from Kyle Orton and completes an 87-yard touchdown play with 11 seconds left to give the Broncos the win.
  - San Francisco 49ers 20, Arizona Cardinals 16
  - New York Giants 23, Washington Redskins 17
    - After missing the entire 2008 season to injury, Osi Umenyiora scores on a fumble recovery to help lead the Giants.
  - Seattle Seahawks 28, St. Louis Rams 0
  - Green Bay Packers 21, Chicago Bears 15
    - Aaron Rodgers connects with Greg Jennings for a 50-yard TD pass with 1:11 left for the win. Rodgers' counterpart, Jay Cutler, is intercepted four times. The Bears also lose Brian Urlacher for the season with a dislocated wrist.

==== Athletics ====
- World Athletics Final in Thessaloniki, Greece:
  - Men:
    - 200 m: (gold) Usain Bolt (JAM) 19.68 (CR)
    - 1500 m: (gold) William Biwott Tanui (KEN) 3:35.04
    - 5000 m: (gold) Imane Merga (ETH) 13:29.75
    - 3000 m steeplechase: (gold) Ezekiel Kemboi (KEN) 8:04.38
    - 110 m hurdles: (gold) Ryan Brathwaite (BAR) 13.16
    - Pole vault: (gold) Maksym Mazuryk (UKR) 5.70
    - Long jump: (gold) Fabrice Lapierre (AUS) 8.33 (wind 2.4)
    - Hammer: (gold) Primož Kozmus (SLO) 79.80
    - Javelin: (gold) Andreas Thorkildsen (NOR) 87.75
  - Women:
    - 100 m: (gold) Carmelita Jeter (USA) 10.67 (CR)
    - 400 m: (gold) Sanya Richards (USA) 49.95
    - 800 m: (gold) Anna Willard (USA) 2:00.20
    - 3000 m: (gold) Meseret Defar (ETH) 8:30.15 (WL)
    - 400 m hurdles: (gold) Melaine Walker (JAM) 53.36 (CR)
    - High jump: (gold) Blanka Vlašić (CRO) 2.04 (CR)
    - Triple jump: (gold) Mabel Gay (CUB) 14.62
    - Shot put: (gold) Valerie Vili (NZL) 21.07 (CR)
    - Discus: (gold) Yarelis Barrios (CUB) 65.86 (CR)

==== Auto racing ====
- Formula One:
  - Italian Grand Prix at Monza:
    - (1) Rubens Barichello (BRA) (Brawn–Mercedes) 1:16:21.706 (2) Jenson Button (GBR) (Brawn-Mercedes) +2.872 (3) Kimi Räikkönen (FIN) (Ferrari) +30.664
      - Drivers' standings (after 13 of 17 races): (1) Button 80 points (2) Barrichello 66 (3) Sebastian Vettel (GER) (Red Bull–Renault) 54
      - Constructors' standings: (1) Brawn-Mercedes 146 (2) Red Bull-Renault 105.5 (3) Ferrari 62
- V8 Supercars:
  - L&H 500 in Phillip Island, Victoria:
    - Round 17: (1) Will Davison (AUS) & Garth Tander (AUS) (Holden Commodore) (2) Jamie Whincup (AUS) & Craig Lowndes (AUS) (Ford Falcon) (3) Steven Richards (NZL) & Mark Winterbottom (AUS) (Ford Falcon)

==== Basketball ====
- EuroBasket in Poland: (teams in **bold** advance to the quarterfinals)
  - Group E in Bydgoszcz:
    - North Macedonia 86–75 Germany
    - **Greece** 65–68 Russia
    - Croatia 79–87 **France**
      - Standings (after 4 games): France 8 points, Greece 7, Russia 6, Macedonia, Croatia, Germany 5.

==== Camogie ====
- All-Ireland Championship Final in Dublin:
  - Cork 0–15–0-07 Kilkenny
    - Cork win the title for a second consecutive time.

==== Cycling ====
- Vuelta a España:
  - Stage 14 – Granada to La Pandera, 157 km: (1) Damiano Cunego (ITA) (Lampre–NGC) 4h 04' 23" (2) Jakob Fuglsang (DEN) (Team Saxo Bank) + 2' 23" (3) Samuel Sánchez (ESP) (Euskaltel–Euskadi) + 3' 08"
  - General classification: (1) Alejandro Valverde (ESP) (Caisse d'Epargne) 60h 30' 53" (2) Robert Gesink (NED) (Rabobank) + 31' (3) Sánchez + 1' 10"

==== Football (soccer) ====
- CAF Champions League group stage, round 5: (teams in **bold** advance to the semifinals)
  - Group A:
    - **Kano Pillars** (Nigeria) 3–2 (Zambia) ZESCO United
      - Standings: **Al-Hilal**, Kano Pillars 10 points, ZESCO United 5, Al-Merreikh 2.

==== Golf ====
- PGA Tour:
  - FedEx Cup Playoffs:
    - BMW Championship in Lemont, Illinois:
      - Winner: Tiger Woods (USA) 265 (−19)
        - After firing a course-record 62 on Saturday, Woods cruises to his sixth tour win of the year by eight shots.
- European Tour:
  - Mercedes-Benz Championship in Pulheim, Germany:
    - Winner: James Kingston (RSA) 275 (−13)^{PO}
      - Kingston wins his second European Tour title and 15th professional tournament.
- LPGA Tour:
  - P&G Beauty NW Arkansas Championship in Rogers, Arkansas:
    - Winner: Jiyai Shin (KOR) 275 (−9)^{PO}
      - Shin wins her third LPGA title of the year in a playoff over Angela Stanford (USA) and Sun Young Yoo (KOR).
- Walker Cup Match in Ardmore, Pennsylvania
  - **Team USA** (United States) 16½–9½ (United Kingdom) (Republic of Ireland) Team Great Britain & Ireland
    - Team USA wins the Cup for the third consecutive time.

==== Gymnastics ====
- Rhythmic Gymnastics World Championships in Ise, Mie, Japan:
  - Groups 5 Hoops: (gold) Russia (silver) Italy (bronze) Belarus
  - Groups 3 Ribbons + 2 Ropes: (gold) Italy (silver) Belarus (bronze) Russia

==== Rugby league ====
- NRL Finals Series:
  - Qualifying Finals:
    - St George Illawarra Dragons 12–25 **Parramatta Eels**
  - Eliminated from Finals Series: Manly-Warringah Sea Eagles, Newcastle Knights

==== Snooker ====
- Shanghai Masters, final: (seeding in parentheses)
  - **Ronnie O'Sullivan (ENG)** (3) def. Liang Wenbo (CHN) 10–5

==== Tennis ====
- US Open, day 14: (seeding in parentheses)
  - Men's singles, semifinals:
    - Roger Federer (SUI) [1] def. Novak Djokovic (SRB) [4] 7–6 (3), 7–5, 7–5
    - Juan Martín del Potro (ARG) [6] def. Rafael Nadal (ESP) [3] 6–2, 6–2, 6–2
  - Women's singles, final:
    - **Kim Clijsters (BEL)** [WC] def. Caroline Wozniacki (DEN) [9] 7–5, 6–3
      - Clijsters caps her comeback from a two-year retirement by becoming the first unseeded woman to win the US Open and the first mother to win a Grand Slam event since Evonne Goolagong won Wimbledon in 1980.
  - Men's doubles, final:
    - **Lukáš Dlouhý (CZE) / Leander Paes (IND)** [4] def. Mahesh Bhupathi (IND) / Mark Knowles (BAH) [3] 3–6, 6–3, 6–2
      - Dlouhý and Paes win their second Grand Slam doubles title as a team, and Paes wins his second US Open and sixth Grand Slam title.

==== Volleyball ====
- European Men's Championship in İzmir, Turkey:
  - Bronze medal match: (bronze) Bulgaria 3–0 Russia
  - Final: (gold) Poland 3–1 (silver) France
    - Poland win the title for the first time.
- Asian Women's Championship in Hanoi, Vietnam:
  - Bronze medal match: South Korea 0–3 (bronze) Japan
  - Final: (silver) China 1–3 (gold) Thailand
    - Thailand win the title for the first time.
- Final Four Women's Cup in Lima, Peru:
  - Bronze medal match: (bronze) Dominican Republic 3–0 Peru
  - Final: (gold) Brazil 3–1 (silver) United States

=== September 12, 2009 (Saturday) ===
==== American football ====
- NCAA
  - AP Top 10:
    - (1) Florida 56, Troy 6
    - (2) Texas 41, Wyoming 10
    - (3) USC 18, (8) Ohio State 15
    - (4) Alabama 40, Florida International 14
    - Houston 45, (5) Oklahoma State 35
    - (7) Penn State 28, Syracuse 7
    - (9) Brigham Young 54, Tulane 3
    - (10) California 59, Eastern Washington 7
  - Other games:
    - Michigan 38, (18) Notre Dame 34
    - Akron 41, Morgan State 0
      - The Zips make a winning debut at their new InfoCision Stadium.
    - Minnesota 20, Air Force 13
      - The Gophers do the same at their new TCF Bank Stadium.
- NFL news:
  - Prosecutors in San Diego dismiss battery and false imprisonment charges made against San Diego Chargers linebacker Shawne Merriman by reality television personality Tila Tequila. (AP via ESPN)

==== Athletics ====
- World Athletics Final in Thessaloniki, Greece:
  - Men:
    - 100 m: (gold) Tyson Gay (USA) 9.88
    - 400 m: (gold) LaShawn Merritt (USA) 44.93
    - 800 m: (gold) David Rudisha (KEN) 1:44.85 CR
    - 3000 m: (gold) Kenenisa Bekele (ETH) 8:03.79
    - 400 m hurdles: (gold) Kerron Clement (USA) 48.11
    - High jump: (gold) Yaroslav Rybakov (RUS) 2.34
    - Triple jump: (gold) Arnie David Giralt (CUB) 17.45
    - Shot put: (gold) Christian Cantwell (USA) 22.07 CR
    - Discus: (gold) Virgilijus Alekna (LTU) 67.63
  - Women:
    - 200 m: (gold) Allyson Felix (USA) 22.29
    - 1500 m: (gold) Nancy Lagat (KEN) 4:13.63
    - 5000 m: (gold) Meseret Defar (ETH) 15:25.43
    - 3000 m steeplechase: (gold) Ruth Bosibori (KEN) 9:13.43 CR
    - 100 m hurdles: (gold) Brigitte Foster-Hylton (JAM) 12.58
    - Pole vault: (gold) Yelena Isinbayeva (RUS) 4.80
    - Long jump: (gold) Brittney Reese (USA) 7.08 CR
    - Hammer: (gold) Betty Heidler (GER) 72.03
    - Javelin: (gold) Mariya Abakumova (RUS) 64.60

==== Australian rules football ====
- AFL finals series:
  - Semifinal 1 at the MCG, Melbourne:
    - **Collingwood** 12.11 (83)–11.12 (78) Adelaide

==== Auto racing ====
- Sprint Cup Series:
  - Chevy Rock & Roll 400 in Richmond, Virginia:
    - (1) Denny Hamlin (Virginia) (Toyota, Joe Gibbs Racing) (2) Kurt Busch (Nevada) (Dodge, Penske Championship Racing) (3) Jeff Gordon (California) (Chevrolet, Hendrick Motorsports)
    - Drivers qualifying for the Chase for the Sprint Cup — points through 26 races, followed by points entering the Chase in parentheses

1. Tony Stewart (Indiana) (Chevrolet, Stewart Haas Racing) — 3806 (5030)
2. Gordon — 3627 (5010)
3. Jimmie Johnson (California) (Chevrolet, Hendrick Motorsports) — 3534 (5030)
4. Hamlin — 3491 (5020)
5. Kurt Busch — 3322 (5010)
6. Mark Martin (Arkansas) (Chevrolet, Hendrick Motorsports) — 3291 (5040)
7. Kasey Kahne (Washington (state)) (Dodge, Richard Petty Motorsports) — 3280 (5020)
8. Carl Edwards (Missouri) (Ford, Roush Fenway Racing) — 3280 (5000)
9. Ryan Newman (Indiana) (Chevrolet, Stewart Haas Racing) — 3272 (5000)
10. Juan Pablo Montoya (Colombia) (Chevrolet, Earnhardt Ganassi Racing) — 3251 (5000)
11. Greg Biffle (Washington (state)) (Ford, Roush Fenway Racing) — 3249 (5000)
12. Brian Vickers (North Carolina) (Toyota, Red Bull Racing Team) — 3203 (5010)

Kurt Busch's brother Kyle Busch, tied with Martin for the most wins this season with four, falls eight points shy of a spot in the Chase.

==== Basketball ====
- EuroBasket in Poland: (teams in **bold** advance to the quarterfinals)
  - Group F in Łódź:
    - **Turkey** 63–60 Spain
    - Poland 72–77 Serbia
    - Lithuania 58–81 Slovenia
      - Standings (after 3 games): Turkey 6 points, Slovenia, Serbia 5, Spain, Poland 4, Lithuania 3.

==== Boxing ====
- World Amateur Championships in Milan, Italy, finals:
  - Light-flyweight (−48 kg):
    - Purevdorj Serdamba (MGL) bt David Ayrapetyan (RUS) 10–5
  - Flyweight (−51 kg):
    - McWilliams Arroyo (PUR) bt Nyambayar Tugstsogt (MGL) 18–2
  - Bantamweight (−54 kg):
    - Detelin Dalakliev (BUL) bt Eduard Abzalimov (RUS) 5–3
  - Featherweight (−57 kg):
    - Vasyl Lomachenko (UKR) bt Sergey Vodopiyanov (RUS) 12–1
  - Lightweight (−60 kg):
    - Domenico Valentino (ITA) bt Jose Pedraza (PUR) 9–4
  - Light-welterweight (−64 kg):
    - Roniel Iglesias (CUB) bt Frankie Gomez (USA) 8–2
  - Welterweight (−69 kg):
    - Jack Culcay-Keth (GER) bt Andrey Zamkovoy (RUS) 7–4
  - Middleweight (−75 kg):
    - Abbos Atoev (UZB) bt Andranik Hakobyan (ARM) 9–0
  - Light-heavyweight (−81 kg):
    - Artur Beterbiev (RUS) bt Elshod Rasulov (UZB) 13–10
  - Heavyweight (−91 kg):
    - Egor Mekhontsev (RUS) bt Osmai Acosta (CUB) 12–2
  - Super-heavyweight (+91 kg):
    - Roberto Cammarelle (ITA) bt Roman Kapitonenko (UKR) 10–5

==== Cricket ====
- Australia in England:
  - 4th ODI at Lord's, London:
    - England 220 (46.3 ov); Australia 221/3 (43.4 ov). **Australia win by 7 wickets and take an unassailable 4–0 lead in the 7-match series.**
- Tri-series in Sri Lanka:
  - Sri Lanka 307/6 (50 ov); India 168 (37.2 ov) in Colombo. **Sri Lanka win by 139 runs.**
    - Final standings: Sri Lanka 10 points, India 4, New Zealand 0.

==== Cycling ====
- Vuelta a España:
  - Stage 13 – Berja to Sierra Nevada, 175 km: (1) David Moncoutié (FRA) (Cofidis) 5h 09' 22" (2) Ezequiel Mosquera (ESP) (Xacobeo–Galicia) + 52" (3) Alejandro Valverde (ESP) (Caisse d'Epargne) + 1' 16"
  - General classification: (1) Valverde 56h 23' 08" (2) Robert Gesink (NED) (Rabobank) + 27" (3) Ivan Basso (ITA) (Liquigas) + 1' 02"

==== Football (soccer) ====
- CAF Champions League group stage, round 5: (teams in **bold** advance to the semifinals)
  - Group B:
    - **Heartland** (Nigeria) 2–0 (Democratic Republic of the Congo) TP Mazembe
    - Étoile du Sahel (Tunisia) 2–0 (Zimbabwe) Monomotapa United
      - Standings: Heartland 10 points, TP Mazembe 9, Étoile du Sahel 7, Monomotapa United 3.

==== Gymnastics ====
- Rhythmic Gymnastics World Championships in Ise, Mie, Japan:
  - Groups All-Around: (gold) Italy (silver) Belarus (bronze) Russia

==== Horse racing ====
- English Triple Crown:
  - St. Leger Stakes in Doncaster:
    - Winner: Mastery (jockey: Ted Durcan, trainer: Saeed bin Suroor)

==== Rugby league ====
- NRL Finals Series:
  - Qualifying Finals:
    - Gold Coast Titans 32–40 **Brisbane Broncos**
    - **Bulldogs** 26–12 Newcastle Knights

==== Rugby union ====
- Tri Nations Series:
  - New Zealand 29–32 South Africa in Hamilton
    - Standings: **South Africa** 21 points (6 matches), New Zealand 9 (5), Australia 7 (5)
    - The Springboks claim their third Tri Nations crown and their first since 2004.

==== Snooker ====
- Shanghai Masters, semi-finals: (seeding in parentheses)
  - Liang Wenbo (CHN) def. Shaun Murphy (ENG) (5) 6–5
  - Ronnie O'Sullivan (ENG) (3) def. John Higgins (SCO) [2] 6–1

==== Tennis ====
- US Open, day 13: (seeding in parentheses)
  - Men's singles, quarterfinals:
    - Rafael Nadal (ESP) [3] def. Fernando González (CHI) [11] 7–6(4), 7–6(2), 6–0
  - Women's singles, semifinals:
    - Kim Clijsters (BEL) def. Serena Williams (USA) [2] 6–4, 7–5
      - Williams is given a code violation penalty at match point for yelling at a lineswoman.
    - Caroline Wozniacki (DEN) [9] def. Yanina Wickmayer (BEL) 6–3, 6–3
  - Men's doubles – Finals:
    - Lukáš Dlouhý (CZE) / Leander Paes (IND) [4] vs. Mahesh Bhupathi (IND) / Mark Knowles (BAH) [3] Cancelled

==== Volleyball ====
- European Men's Championship in İzmir, Turkey:
  - Semifinals:
    - **Poland** 3–0 Bulgaria
    - Russia 2–3 **France**
- Asian Women's Championship in Hanoi, Vietnam:
  - Semifinals:
    - **China** 3–1 South Korea
    - Japan 1–3 **Thailand**
- Final Four Women's Cup in Lima, Peru:
  - Semifinals:
    - Brazil 3–0 Peru
    - Dominican Republic 1–3 United States

=== September 11, 2009 (Friday) ===
==== Australian rules football ====
- AFL finals series:
  - Semifinal 2 at the MCG, Melbourne:
    - **Western Bulldogs** 16.11 (107)–8.8 (56) Brisbane Lions

==== Auto racing ====
- Nationwide Series:
  - Virginia 529 College Savings 250 in Richmond, Virginia:
    - (1) Carl Edwards (Missouri) (Ford, Roush Fenway Racing) (2) Kevin Harvick (California) (Chevrolet, Kevin Harvick Incorporated) (3) Kyle Busch (Nevada) (Toyota, Joe Gibbs Racing)

==== Basketball ====
- EuroBasket in Poland: (teams in **bold** advance to the quarterfinals)
  - Group E in Bydgoszcz:
    - Russia 62–59 Croatia
    - Germany 76–84 **Greece**
    - **France** 83–57 North Macedonia
      - Standings (after 3 games): Greece, France 6 points, Russia, Germany, Croatia 4, Macedonia 3.
- Five new members are inducted to the Hall of Fame:
  - Players: John Stockton, David Robinson, Michael Jordan
  - Coaches: C. Vivian Stringer, Jerry Sloan

==== Boxing ====
- World Amateur Championships in Milan, Italy, semifinals:
  - Light-flyweight (−48 kg):
    - Purevdorj Serdamba (MGL) bt Li Jiazhao (CHN) 11–7
    - David Ayrapetyan (RUS) bt Shin Jong-Hun (KOR) 9–1
  - Flyweight (−51 kg):
    - McWilliams Arroyo (PUR) bt Ronny Beblik (GER) 9–7
    - Nyambayar Tugstsogt (MGL) bt Misha Aloyan (RUS) 8–7
  - Bantamweight (−54 kg):
    - Detelin Dalakliev (BUL) bt Yankiel León (CUB) 5–0
    - Eduard Abzalimov (RUS) bt John-Joe Nevin (IRL) 5–4
  - Featherweight (−57 kg):
    - Vasyl Lomachenko (UKR) bt Óscar Valdez (MEX) 12–1
    - Sergey Vodopiyanov (RUS) bt Bahodirjon Sultonov (UZB) 7–5
  - Lightweight (−60 kg):
    - Domenico Valentino (ITA) bt Koba Pkhakadze (GEO) 15–2
    - Jose Pedraza (PUR) bt Albert Selimov (RUS) 9–5
  - Light-welterweight (−64 kg):
    - Roniel Iglesias (CUB) bt Uranchimeg Munkh (MGL) 6–4
    - Frankie Gomez (USA) bt Gyula Kate (HUN) 8–7
  - Welterweight (−69 kg):
    - Jack Culcay-Keth (GER) bt Botirjon Makhmudov (UZB) 6–4
    - Andrey Zamkovoy (RUS) bt Serik Sapiyev (KAZ) 16–10
  - Middleweight (−75 kg):
    - Abbos Atoev (UZB) bt Vijender Singh (IND) 7–3
    - Andranik Hakobyan (ARM) bt Alfonso Blanco (VEN) 4–3
  - Light-heavyweight (−81 kg):
    - Artur Beterbiev (RUS) bt Jose Larduet (CUB) 10–6
    - Elshod Rasulov (UZB) bt Abdelkader Bouhenia (FRA) 8–4
  - Heavyweight (−91 kg):
    - Osmai Acosta (CUB) bt John M'Bumba (FRA) 9–2
    - Egor Mekhontsev (RUS) bt Oleksandr Usyk (UKR) 14–10
  - Super-heavyweight (+91 kg):
    - Roberto Cammarelle (ITA) bt Viktar Zuyeu (BLR) retired
    - Roman Kapitonenko (UKR) bt Zhang Zhilei (CHN) 5–2

==== Cricket ====
- Tri-series in Sri Lanka:
  - New Zealand 155 (46.3 ov); India 156/4 (40.3 ov) in Colombo. **India win by 6 wickets** .
    - Standings: Sri Lanka 5 points, India 4, New Zealand 0.
    - Sri Lanka and India advance to the final.

==== Cycling ====
- Vuelta a España:
  - Stage 12 – Almería to Alto de Velefique, 174 km: (1) Ryder Hesjedal (CAN) (Garmin–Slipstream) 5h 34' 31" (2) David García (ESP) (Xacobeo–Galicia) + 1" (3) Robert Gesink (NED) (Rabobank) + 6"
  - General classification: (1) Alejandro Valverde (ESP) (Caisse d'Epargne) 51h 12' 38" (2) Cadel Evans (AUS) (Silence–Lotto) + 7" (3) Gesink + 18"

==== Football (soccer) ====
- CAF Champions League group stage, round 5:
  - Group A:
    - Al-Hilal (Sudan) 3–1 (Sudan) Al-Merreikh
      - Standings: Al-Hilal 10 points (5 matches), Kano Pillars 7 (4), ZESCO United 5 (4), Al-Merreikh 2 (5).

==== Gymnastics ====
- Rhythmic Gymnastics World Championships in Ise, Mie, Japan:
  - Individual All-Around: (gold) Evgenia Kanaeva (RUS) (silver) Daria Kondakova (RUS) (bronze) Anna Bessonova (UKR)
    - Kanaeva wins six gold medals.

==== Rugby league ====
- NRL Finals Series:
  - Qualifying Final:
    - **Melbourne Storm** 40–12 Manly-Warringah Sea Eagles

==== Snooker ====
- Shanghai Masters, quarter-finals: (seeding in parentheses)
  - Liang Wenbo (CHN) def. Ricky Walden (ENG) (1) 5–3
  - Shaun Murphy (ENG) (5) def. Ken Doherty (IRL) 5–0
  - Ronnie O'Sullivan (ENG) (3) def. Ding Junhui (CHN) [14] 5–3
  - John Higgins (SCO) (2) def. Ryan Day (WAL) [7] 5–1

==== Tennis ====
- US Open, day 12: (seeding in parentheses)
  - Women's singles, semifinals:
    - Kim Clijsters (BEL) vs. Serena Williams (USA) [2] Cancelled
    - Yanina Wickmayer (BEL) vs. Caroline Wozniacki (DEN) [9] Cancelled
  - Men's singles, quarterfinals:
    - Fernando González (CHI) [11] vs. Rafael Nadal (ESP) [3] 6–7(4), 6–6 (2–3) Suspended
  - Men's doubles – Finals:
    - Lukáš Dlouhý (CZE)/Leander Paes (IND) [4] vs. Mahesh Bhupathi (IND)/Mark Knowles (BAH) [3] Cancelled

==== Volleyball ====
- Asian Women's Championship in Hanoi, Vietnam:
  - Quarterfinals:
    - **China** 3–0 Chinese Taipei
    - **South Korea** 3–0 Vietnam
    - **Japan** 3–0 Iran
    - Kazakhstan 1–3 **Thailand**
- Final Four Women's Cup in Lima, Peru:
  - Preliminary round:
    - United States 0–3 Dominican Republic
    - Brazil 3–0 Peru
      - Standings: Brazil 6 points, Dominican Republic 5, USA 4, Peru 3.

=== September 10, 2009 (Thursday) ===
==== American football ====
- NFL week 1:
  - Pittsburgh Steelers 13, Tennessee Titans 10 (OT)

==== Football (soccer) ====
- Women's Euro in Finland:
  - Final: England 2–6 **Germany**
    - Germany win the title for the fifth consecutive time and seventh overall.

==== Gymnastics ====
- Rhythmic Gymnastics World Championships in Ise, Mie, Japan:
  - Individual Ball: (gold) Evgenia Kanaeva (RUS) (silver) Aliya Garayeva (AZE) (bronze) Anna Bessonova (UKR)
  - Individual Ribbon: (gold) Evgenia Kanaeva (RUS) (silver) Anna Bessonova (UKR) (bronze) Silviya Miteva (BUL)
  - Team All-Around: (gold) Russia (Evgenia Kanaeva, Daria Kondakova, Daria Dmitrieva, Olga Kapranova) (silver) Belarus (Melitina Staniouta, Svetlana Rudalova, Liubou Charkashyna) (bronze) Azerbaijan (Zeynab Javadli, Anna Gurbanova, Aliya Garayeva)

==== Snooker ====
- Shanghai Masters, last 16: (seeding in parentheses)
  - Ding Junhui (CHN) (14) def. Stuart Bingham (ENG) 5–2
  - John Higgins (SCO) (2) def. Mark Williams (WAL) 5–1
  - Shaun Murphy (ENG) (5) def. Jamie Cope (ENG) 5–0
  - Ken Doherty (IRL) def. Barry Hawkins (ENG) 5–4
  - Ronnie O'Sullivan (ENG) (3) def. Marco Fu (HKG) (9) 5–2
  - Ricky Walden (ENG) (1) def. Stephen Hendry (SCO) (11) 5–1
  - Liang Wenbo (CHN) def. Ali Carter (ENG) (6) 5–0
  - Ryan Day (WAL) (7) def. Matthew Stevens (WAL) 5–1

==== Tennis ====
- US Open, day 11: (seeding in parentheses)
  - Men's singles, quarterfinals:
    - Juan Martín del Potro (ARG) [6] def. Marin Čilić (CRO) [16] 4–6, 6–3, 6–2, 6–1
    - Fernando González (CHI) [11] vs. Rafael Nadal (ESP) [3] 6–7(4), 6–6 (2–3) Suspended
  - Mixed doubles, final:
    - Carly Gullickson (USA) / Travis Parrott (USA) def. Cara Black (ZIM)/Leander Paes (IND) [2] 6–2, 6–4
      - Gullickson and Parrott both win their first Grand Slam title.

==== Volleyball ====
- European Men's Championship in İzmir and İstanbul, Turkey: (teams in **bold** advance to the semifinals)
  - Pool E in Izmir:
    - Germany 3–1 Slovakia
    - **France** 3–1 Spain
    - **Poland** 3–0 Greece
      - Standings: Poland 10 points, France 9, Germany 8, Greece 7, Spain 6, Slovakia 5.
  - Pool F in Istanbul:
    - **Russia** 3–0 **Bulgaria**
    - Finland 0–3 Italy
    - Netherlands 1–3 Serbia
      - Standings: Russia 10 points, Bulgaria 9, Serbia 8, Netherlands 7, Italy 6, Finland 5.
- Asian Women's Championship in Hanoi, Vietnam:
  - Pool E:
    - Iran 0–3 Kazakhstan
    - Vietnam 0–3 China
      - Standings: China 6 points, Kazakhstan 5, Vietnam 4, Iran 3.
  - Pool F:
    - Chinese Taipei 0–3 Thailand
    - Japan 3–1 South Korea
      - Standings: Japan 6 points, Korea 5, Thailand 4, Chinese Taipei 3.
- Final Four Women's Cup in Lima, Peru:
  - Preliminary round:
    - Brazil 3–0 Dominican Republic
    - United States 3–1 Peru
      - Standings: Brazil 4 points, Dominican Republic, USA 3, Peru 2.

==== Windsurfing ====
- Neil Pryde RS:X World Championships in Weymouth and Portland, England:
  - Men: (gold) Nick Dempsey (GBR) 24.0 points (silver) Nimrod Mashiah (ISR) 42.0 (bronze) Dorian van Rijsselberge (NED) 46.0
  - Women: (gold) Marina Alabau (ESP) 28.0 points (silver) Blanca Manchon (ESP) 36.0 (bronze) Charline Picon (FRA) 44.0

=== September 9, 2009 (Wednesday) ===
==== Basketball ====
- EuroBasket in Poland: (teams in **bold** advance to the second round)
  - Group A in Poznań:
    - **Macedonia** 71–81 **Croatia**
    - Israel 80–106 **Greece**
      - Standings: Greece 6 points, Croatia 5, Macedonia 4, Israel 3.
      - Israel is eliminated in the first round for the first time since 1993, and fails to win any game for the first time ever.
  - Group B in Gdańsk:
    - **Russia** 64–69 **France**
    - **Germany** 62–68 Latvia
      - Standings: France 6 points, Russia, Germany, Latvia 4.
  - Group C in Warsaw:
    - **Spain** 90–84 (OT) **Slovenia**
    - Great Britain 59–77 **Serbia**
      - Standings: Slovenia, Serbia, Spain 5 points, Great Britain 3.
  - Group D in Wrocław:
    - **Poland** 69–87 **Turkey**
    - **Lithuania** 84–69 Bulgaria
      - Standings: Turkey 6 points, Poland 5, Lithuania 4, Bulgaria 3.

==== Cricket ====
- Australia in England:
  - 3rd ODI in Southampton:
    - England 228/9 (50 ov); Australia 230/4 (48.3 ov, Cameron White 105). **Australia win by 6 wickets. Australia lead the 7-match series 3–0**.

==== Cycling ====
- Vuelta a España:
  - Stage 11 – Murcia to Caravaca de la Cruz, 191 km: (1) Tyler Farrar (USA) (Garmin–Slipstream) 5h 11' 10" (2) Philippe Gilbert (BEL) (Silence–Lotto) + 0" (3) Marco Marcato (ITA) (Vacansoleil) + 0"
  - General classification: (1) Alejandro Valverde (ESP) (Caisse d'Epargne) 45h 37' 51" (2) Cadel Evans (AUS) (Silence–Lotto) + 7" (3) Robert Gesink (NED) (Rabobank) + 36"

==== Football (soccer) ====
- 2010 FIFA World Cup qualification: (teams in **bold** qualify for 2010 FIFA World Cup, teams in italics secure playoff berths)
  - Europe:
    - Group 1:
      - Malta 0–1 Sweden
      - Albania 1–1 Denmark
      - Hungary 0–1 Portugal
        - Standings: Denmark 18 points, Sweden 15, Portugal, Hungary 13.
    - Group 2:
      - Israel 7–0 Luxembourg
      - Latvia 2–2 Switzerland
      - Moldova 1–1 Greece
        - Standings: Switzerland 17 points, Greece, Latvia 14, Israel 12.
    - Group 3:
      - Czech Republic 7–0 San Marino
      - Northern Ireland 0–2 Slovakia
      - Slovenia 3–0 Poland
        - Standings: Slovakia 19 points (8 matches), Slovenia 14 (8), Northern Ireland 14 (9), Czech Republic 12 (8), Poland 11 (8).
    - Group 4:
      - Liechtenstein 1–1 Finland
      - Wales 1–3 Russia
      - Germany 4–0 Azerbaijan
        - Standings: Germany 22 points, Russia 21, Finland 14.
    - Group 5:
      - Bosnia and Herzegovina 1–1 Turkey
      - Armenia 2–1 Belgium
      - **Spain** 3–0 Estonia
        - Standings: Spain 24 points, Bosnia-Herzegovina 16, Turkey 12.
    - Group 6:
      - **England** 5–1 Croatia
      - Andorra 1–3 Kazakhstan
      - Belarus 0–0 Ukraine
        - Standings: England 24 points, Croatia 17, Ukraine 15.
    - Group 7:
      - Faroe Islands 2–1 Lithuania
      - Romania 1–1 Austria
      - Serbia 1–1 France
        - Standings: Serbia 19 points, France 15, Austria 11, Lithuania, Romania 9.
    - Group 8:
      - Montenegro 1–1 Cyprus
      - Italy 2–0 Bulgaria
        - Standings: Italy 20 points, Ireland 16, Bulgaria 11.
    - Group 9:
      - Norway 2–1 Macedonia
      - Scotland 0–1 **Netherlands**
        - Final standings: Netherlands 24 points, Norway, Scotland 10.
  - South America round 16:
    - Bolivia 1–3 Ecuador
    - Uruguay 3–1 Colombia
    - **Paraguay** 1–0 Argentina
    - Venezuela 3–1 Peru
    - **Brazil** 4–2 Chile
      - Standings: Brazil 33 points, Paraguay 30, Chile 27, Ecuador 23, Argentina 22, Uruguay, Venezuela 21, Colombia 20.
  - Africa third round:
    - Group A:
      - Cameroon 2–1 Gabon
        - Standings: Cameroon 7 points, Gabon 6, Togo 5, Morocco 3.
  - North & Central America fourth round, matchday 8:
    - Trinidad and Tobago 0–1 United States
    - El Salvador 1–0 Costa Rica
    - Mexico 1–0 Honduras
      - Standings: USA 16 points, Mexico 15, Honduras 13, Costa Rica 12, El Salvador 8, Trinidad and Tobago 5.
  - Asia fifth round, second leg: (first leg score in parentheses)
    - Saudi Arabia 2–2 (0–0) Bahrain. 2–2 on aggregate, Bahrain win on away goals.
      - Bahrain will play against New Zealand in Inter-confederation Playoffs.

==== Snooker ====
- Shanghai Masters, last 32: (seeding in parentheses)
  - Ding Junhui (CHN) (14) def. Stephen Lee (ENG) 5–2
  - Shaun Murphy (ENG) (5) def. Michael Holt (ENG) 5–1
  - Ali Carter (ENG) (6) def. Tian Pengfei (CHN) 5–3
  - Jamie Cope (ENG) def. Joe Perry (ENG) (13) 5–4
  - Ronnie O'Sullivan (ENG) (3) def. Graeme Dott (SCO) 5–0
  - Barry Hawkins (ENG) walkover Stephen Maguire (SCO) (4)
  - Matthew Stevens (WAL) def. Mark Allen (NIR) (12) 5–2
  - Mark Williams (WAL) (16) def. Joe Swail (NIR) 5–3

==== Tennis ====
- US Open, day 10: (seeding in parentheses)
  - Men's singles, quarterfinals:
    - Novak Djokovic (SRB) [4] def. Fernando Verdasco (ESP) [10] 7–6 (2), 1–6, 7–5, 6–2
    - Roger Federer (SUI) [1] def. Robin Söderling (SWE) [12] 6–0, 6–3, 6–7(6), 7–6(6)
  - Women's singles, quarterfinals:
    - Yanina Wickmayer (BEL) def. Kateryna Bondarenko (UKR) 7–5, 6–4
    - Caroline Wozniacki (DEN) [9] def. Melanie Oudin (USA) 6–2, 6–2

==== Volleyball ====
- European Men's Championship in İzmir and İstanbul, Turkey: (teams in **bold** advance to the semifinals)
  - Pool E in Izmir:
    - Spain 1–3 Germany
    - Slovakia 2–3 **Poland**
    - Greece 1–3 France
      - Standings: Poland 8 points, France 7, Germany, Greece 6, Spain 5, Slovakia 4.
  - Pool F in Istanbul:
    - Italy 0–3 **Russia**
    - **Bulgaria** 3–1 Netherlands
    - Serbia 3–0 Finland
      - Standings: Russia, Bulgaria 8 points, Serbia, Netherlands 6, Italy, Finland 4.
- Asian Women's Championship in Hanoi, Vietnam:
  - Pool E:
    - China 3–0 Iran
    - Vietnam 1–3 Kazakhstan
      - Standings: China 4 points, Vietnam, Kazakhstan 3, Iran 2.
  - Pool F:
    - Japan 3–0 Thailand
    - South Korea 3–0 Chinese Taipei
      - Standings: Japan, Korea 4 points, Thailand, Chinese Taipei 2.
- Final Four Women's Cup in Lima, Peru:
  - Preliminary round:
    - Brazil 3–2 United States
    - Dominican Republic 3–0 Peru
      - Standings: Dominican Republic, Brazil 2 points, USA, Peru 1.

=== September 8, 2009 (Tuesday) ===
==== Basketball ====
- EuroBasket in Poland: (All times CET, teams in **bold** advance to the second round)
  - Group A in Poznań:
    - Israel 79–82 **Macedonia**
    - **Greece** 76–68 **Croatia**
  - Group B in Gdańsk:
    - Germany 76–73 Russia
    - Latvia 51–60 **France**
  - Group C in Warsaw:
    - **Slovenia** 80–69 Serbia
    - Spain 84–76 Great Britain
  - Group D in Wrocław:
    - Lithuania 75–86 **Poland**
    - Bulgaria 66–94 **Turkey**

==== Cricket ====
- Tri-series in Sri Lanka:
  - Sri Lanka 216/7 (50 ov, Thilan Samaraweera 104); New Zealand 119 (36.1 ov) in Colombo. **Sri Lanka win by 97 runs**.

==== Cycling ====
- Vuelta a España:
  - Stage 10 – Alicante to Murcia, 186 km: (1) Simon Gerrans (AUS) (Cervélo TestTeam) 3h 56' 19" (2) Ryder Hesjedal (CAN) (Garmin–Slipstream) + 0" (3) Jakob Fuglsang (DEN) (Tinkoff) + 0"
  - General classification: (1) Alejandro Valverde (ESP) (Caisse d'Epargne) 40h 26' 41" (2) Cadel Evans (AUS) (Silence–Lotto) + 7" (3) Robert Gesink (NED) (Rabobank) + 36"

==== Gymnastics ====
- Rhythmic Gymnastics World Championships in Ise, Mie, Japan:
  - Individual Rope: (gold) Evgenia Kanaeva (RUS) (silver) Daria Kondakova (RUS) (bronze) Anna Bessonova (UKR)
  - Individual Hoop: (gold) Evgenia Kanaeva (RUS) (silver) Daria Kondakova (RUS) (bronze) Melitina Staniouta (BLR)

==== Snooker ====
- Shanghai Masters, last 32: (seeding in parentheses)
  - Ricky Walden (ENG) (1) def. Mark King (ENG) 5–1
  - Stephen Hendry (SCO) (11) def. Marcus Campbell (SCO) 5–4
  - Marco Fu (HKG) (9) def. Nigel Bond (ENG) 5–4
  - Ryan Day (WAL) (7) def. Li Yan 5–3
  - Liang Wenbo (CHN) def. Peter Ebdon (ENG) (15) 5–1
  - Ken Doherty (IRL) def. Neil Robertson (AUS) (10) 5–4
  - Stuart Bingham (ENG) def. Mark Selby (ENG) (8) 5–3
  - John Higgins (SCO) (2) def. Matthew Selt (ENG) 5–2

==== Tennis ====
- US Open, day 9: (seeding in parentheses)
  - Men's singles, fourth round:
    - Marin Čilić (CRO) [16] def. Andy Murray (GBR) [2] 7–5, 6–2, 6–2
    - Rafael Nadal (ESP) [3] def. Gaël Monfils (FRA) [13] 6–7(3), 6–3, 6–1, 6–3
    - Juan Martín del Potro (ARG) [6] def. Juan Carlos Ferrero (ESP) [24] 6–3, 6–3, 6–3
    - Fernando González (CHI) [11] def. Jo-Wilfried Tsonga (FRA) [7] 3–6, 6–3, 7–6(3), 6–4
  - Women's singles, quarterfinals:
    - Serena Williams (USA) [2] def. Flavia Pennetta (ITA) [10] 6–4, 6–3
    - Kim Clijsters (BEL) def. Li Na (CHN) [18] 6–2, 6–4

==== Volleyball ====
- European Men's Championship in İzmir and İstanbul, Turkey:
  - Pool E in Izmir:
    - Germany 3–1 Greece
    - Poland 3–2 Spain
    - France 3–1 Slovakia
      - Standings: Poland 6 points, France, Greece 5, Germany, Spain 4, Slovakia 3.
  - Pool F in Istanbul:
    - Russia 3–1 Serbia
    - Netherlands 3–1 Italy
    - Finland 0–3 Bulgaria
      - Standings: Bulgaria, Russia 6 points, Netherlands 5, Serbia 4, Italy, Finland 3.

=== September 7, 2009 (Monday) ===
==== American college football ====
- NCAA AP Top 25:
  - Miami 38, (18) Florida State 34

==== Basketball ====
- EuroBasket in Poland:
  - Group A in Poznań:
    - Macedonia 54–86 Greece
    - Croatia 86–79 Israel
  - Group B in Gdańsk:
    - Russia 81–68 Latvia
    - France 70–65 Germany
  - Group C in Warsaw:
    - Great Britain 59–72 Slovenia
    - Serbia 66–57 Spain
  - Group D in Wrocław:
    - Poland 90–78 Bulgaria
    - Turkey 84–76 Lithuania

==== Cycling ====
- Vuelta a España:
  - Stage 9 – Alcoy to Xorret de Catí, 186 km: (1) Gustavo César (ESP) (Xacobeo–Galicia) 5h 21' 04" (2) Marco Marzano (ITA) (Lampre–NGC) + 21" (3) Alejandro Valverde (ESP) (Caisse d'Epargne) + 40"
  - General classification: (1) Valverde 36h 26' 40" (2) Cadel Evans (AUS) (Silence–Lotto) + 7" (3) Robert Gesink (NED) (Rabobank) + 36"

==== Football (soccer) ====
- Women's Euro in Finland:
  - Semi-final: Germany 3–1 Norway
    - Defending champion Germany advance to the final for the fifth straight time.

==== Golf ====
- PGA Tour:
  - FedEx Cup Playoffs:
    - Deutsche Bank Championship in Norton, Massachusetts:
      - Winner: Steve Stricker (USA) 267 (−17)

==== Snooker ====
- Shanghai Masters, Wildcard round:
  - Marcus Campbell (SCO) def. Tang Jun (CHN) 5–1
  - Tian Pengfei (CHN) def. Andrew Higginson (ENG) 5–1
  - Ken Doherty (IRL) def. Aditya Mehta (IND) 5–0
  - Graeme Dott (SCO) def. Mohammed Shehab (UAE) 5–3
  - Nigel Bond (ENG) def. Yu Delu (CHN) 5–4
  - Li Yan (CHN) def. Gerard Greene (NIR) 5–4
  - Matthew Selt (ENG) def. Shi Hanqing (CHN) 5–0

==== Tennis ====
- US Open, day 8: (seeding in parentheses)
  - Men's singles, fourth round:
    - Roger Federer (SUI) [1] def. Tommy Robredo (ESP) [14] 7–5, 6–2, 6–2
    - Novak Djokovic (SRB) [4] def. Radek Štěpánek (CZE) [15] 6–1, 6–3, 6–3
    - Fernando Verdasco (ESP) [10] def. John Isner (USA) 4–6, 6–4, 6–4, 6–4
    - Robin Söderling (SWE) [12] def. Nikolay Davydenko (RUS) [8] 7–5, 3–6, 6–2 Ret.
      - For the first time in the Open Era, no American man advances to the quarterfinals of the US Open.
  - Women's singles, fourth round:
    - Caroline Wozniacki (DEN) [9] def. Svetlana Kuznetsova (RUS) [6] 2–6 7–6(5) 7–6(3)
    - Melanie Oudin (USA) def. Nadia Petrova (RUS) [13] 1–6, 7–6(2), 6–3
    - Kateryna Bondarenko (UKR) def. Gisela Dulko (ARG) 6–0, 6–0
    - Yanina Wickmayer (BEL) def. Petra Kvitová (CZE) 4–6, 6–4, 7–5

==== Volleyball ====
- Asian Women's Championship in Hanoi, Vietnam: (teams in **bold** advance to the second round)
  - Pool A:
    - **Iran** 3–1 Australia
    - Sri Lanka 0–3 **Vietnam**
      - Standings: Vietnam 6 points, Iran 5, Australia 4, Sri Lanka 3.
  - Pool B:
    - **Chinese Taipei** 3–0 Uzbekistan
      - Standings: **Japan (Heian period)** 4 points, Chinese Taipei 3, Uzbekistan 2.
  - Pool C:
    - **China** 3–0 Hong Kong
      - Standings: China 4 points, **Kazakhstan** 3, Hong Kong 2.
  - Pool D:
    - Indonesia 0–3 **Thailand**
    - **South Korea** 3–0 India
      - Standings: South Korea 6 points, Thailand 5, India 4, Indonesia 3.

=== September 6, 2009 (Sunday) ===
==== American college football ====
- NCAA AP Top 10:
  - (8) Mississippi 45, Memphis 14

==== Australian rules football ====
- AFL finals series
  - Qualifying Final 1 in Melbourne:
    - **St Kilda** 12.8 (80)–7.10 (52) Collingwood

==== Auto racing ====
- Sprint Cup Series:
  - Pep Boys Auto 500 in Hampton, Georgia:
    - (1) Kasey Kahne (Washington (state)) (Dodge, Richard Petty Motorsports) (2) Kevin Harvick (California) (Chevrolet, Richard Childress Racing) (3) Juan Pablo Montoya (Colombia) (Chevrolet, Earnhardt Ganassi Racing)
      - Drivers' standings (after 25 of 26 races leading to the Chase for the Sprint Cup): (1) Tony Stewart (Indiana) 3694 points (Chevrolet, Stewart Haas Racing (2) Jeff Gordon (California) 3457 (Chevrolet, Hendrick Motorsports) (3) Jimmie Johnson (California) 3404 (Chevrolet, Hendrick Motorsports)
      - Denny Hamlin (Virginia) becomes the fourth driver to secure his spot in the Chase.
- World Rally Championship:
  - Rally Australia:

==== Basketball ====
- Americas Championship in San Juan, Puerto Rico:
  - 3rd place: Canada 73–88 (bronze) Argentina
  - Final: (gold) Brazil 61–60 (silver) Puerto Rico

==== Cricket ====
- Australia in England:
  - 2nd ODI at Lord's, London:
    - Australia 249/8 (50 overs); England 210 (46.1 overs). **Australia win by 39 runs. Australia lead the 7-match series 2–0**.

==== Cue sports ====
- World Cup of Pool in Quezon City, Philippines:
  - Semifinals:
    - (5) Francisco Bustamante/Efren Reyes (PHI) def. (9) Fu Jianbo/Li Hewen (CHN) 9–8
    - (3) Thorsten Hohmann/Ralf Souquet (GER) def. (2) Ronato Alcano/Dennis Orcollo (PHI) 9–6
  - Final:
    - Bustamante/Reyes def. Hohmann/Souquet 11–9

==== Cycling ====
- Vuelta a España:
  - Stage 8 – Alzira to Alto de Aitana, 206 km: (1) Damiano Cunego (ITA) (Lampre–NGC) 6h 04' 54" (2) David Moncoutié (FRA) (Cofidis) + 33" (3) Robert Gesink (NED) (Rabobank) + 36"
  - General classification: (1) Cadel Evans (AUS) (Silence–Lotto) 31h 05' 02" (2) Alejandro Valverde (ESP) (Caisse d'Epargne) + 2" (3) Samuel Sánchez (ESP) (Euskaltel–Euskadi) + 8"
- Mountain Bike World Championships in Canberra, Australia:
  - Downhill men: (gold) Steve Peat (GBR) 2:30.33 (silver) Greg Minnaar (RSA) + 0.05 (bronze) Michael Hannah (AUS) + 0.69
  - Downhill women: (gold) Emmeline Ragot (FRA) 2:50.05 (silver) Tracy Moseley (GBR) + 2.49 (bronze) Kathleen Pruitt (USA) + 4.84

==== Football (soccer) ====
- 2010 FIFA World Cup qualification: (teams in **bold** qualify for 2010 FIFA World Cup)
  - Africa third round, matchday 4:
    - Group A:
      - Togo 1–1 Morocco
        - Standings: Gabon 6 points (3 matches), Togo 5, Cameroon 4 (3), Morocco 3.
    - Group B:
      - Mozambique 1–0 Kenya
      - Nigeria 2–2 Tunisia
        - Standings: Tunisia 8 points, Nigeria 6, Mozambique 4, Kenya 3.
    - Group C:
      - Algeria 1–0 Zambia
        - Standings: Algeria 10 points, Egypt 7, Zambia 4, Rwanda 1.
    - Group D:
      - Benin 1–1 Mali
      - **Ghana** 2–0 Sudan
        - Standings: Ghana 12 points, Mali 5, Benin 4, Sudan 1.
- Women's Euro in Finland:
  - Semi-final: England 2–1 (ET) Netherlands
    - England advance to the final for the first time since 1984.

==== Golf ====
- European Tour:
  - Omega European Masters in Crans-Montana, Switzerland:
    - Winner: Alexander Norén (SWE) 264 (−20)
- LPGA Tour:
  - Canadian Women's Open in Priddis Greens, Alberta, Canada:
    - Winner: Suzann Pettersen (NOR) 269 (−15)

==== Hurling ====
- All-Ireland Championship Final in Dublin:
  - Kilkenny 2–22–0–23 Tipperary
    - Kilkenny win the title for the fourth consecutive time, a feat only achieved previously by Cork in 1941–44.

==== Motorcycle racing ====
- Moto GP:
  - San Marino Grand Prix in Misano:
    - (1) Valentino Rossi (ITA) (Yamaha) 44:32.882 (2) Jorge Lorenzo (ESP) (Yamaha) +2.416 (3) Dani Pedrosa (ESP) (Honda) +12.400
      - Riders' standings (after 13 of 17 races): (1) Rossi 237 points (2) Lorenzo 207 (3) Pedrosa 157
      - Manufacturers' standings: (1) Yamaha 305 points (2) Honda 220 (3) Ducati 191
- Superbike:
  - Nürburgring Superbike World Championship round in Nürburg, Germany:
    - Race 1: (1) Ben Spies (USA) (Yamaha) 39:04.818 (2) Noriyuki Haga (JPN) (Ducati) +3.850 (3) Carlos Checa (ESP) (Honda) +6.990
    - Race 2: (1) Jonathan Rea (GBR) (Honda) 39:01.561 (2) Spies +0.786 (3) Checa +4.993
      - Riders' standings (after 11 of 14 rounds): (1) Spies 364 points (2) Haga 346 (3) Michel Fabrizio (ITA) (Ducati) 286
      - Manufacturers' standings: (1) Ducati 383 points (2) Yamaha 337 (3) Honda 273

==== Tennis ====
- US Open, day 7: (seeding in parentheses)
  - Men's singles, third round:
    - Rafael Nadal (ESP) [3] def. Nicolás Almagro (ESP) [32] 7–5, 6–4, 6–4
    - Taylor Dent (USA) def. Andy Murray (GBR) [2] 6–3, 6–2, 6–2
    - Juan Carlos Ferrero (ESP) [24] def. Gilles Simon (FRA) [9] 1–6, 6–4, 7–6 (7/5), 1–0, retired
    - Juan Martín del Potro (ARG) [6] def. Daniel Köllerer (AUT) 6–1, 3–6, 6–3, 6–3
    - Jo-Wilfried Tsonga (FRA) [7] defs. Julien Benneteau (FRA) 7–6(4), 6–2, 6–4
  - Women's singles, fourth round:
    - Serena Williams (USA) [2] def. Daniela Hantuchová (SVK) [22] 6–2, 6–0
    - Kim Clijsters (BEL) def. Venus Williams (USA) [3] 6–0, 0–6, 6–4
    - Flavia Pennetta (ITA) [10] def. Vera Zvonareva (RUS) [7] 3–6, 7–6 (6), 6–0
      - Pennetta saves 6 match points in the second set.
    - Li Na (CHN) [18] def. Francesca Schiavone (ITA) [26] 6–2, 6–3

==== Volleyball ====
- European Men's Championship in İzmir and İstanbul, Turkey: (teams in **bold** advance to the second round)
  - Pool A in Izmir:
    - Turkey 0–3 **France**
      - Standings: **Poland** 6 points, France 5, **Germany** 4, Turkey 3.
  - Pool B in Istanbul:
    - **Russia** 3–0 **Finland**
      - Standings: Russia 6 points, **Netherlands** 5, Finland 4, Estonia 3.
  - Pool C in Izmir:
    - Slovenia 1–3 **Greece**
    - **Slovakia** 2–3 **Spain**
      - Standings: Greece 6 points, Spain 5, Slovakia 4, Slovenia 3.
  - Pool D in Istanbul:
    - **Serbia** 3–1 **Italy**
    - Czech Republic 1–3 **Bulgaria**
      - Standings: Bulgaria 6 points, Serbia 5, Italy 4, Czech Republic 3.
- Asian Women's Championship in Hanoi, Vietnam: (teams in **bold** advance to the second round)
  - Pool A:
    - Australia 3–0 Sri Lanka
    - **Vietnam** 3–0 Iran
  - Pool B:
    - Uzbekistan 0–3 **Japan**
  - Pool C:
    - Hong Kong 0–3 **Kazakhstan**
  - Pool D:
    - India 3–2 Indonesia
    - Thailand 2–3 South Korea

=== September 5, 2009 (Saturday) ===
==== American college football ====
- NCAA AP Top 10:
  - (1) Florida 62, Charleston Southern 3
  - (2) Texas 59, Louisiana–Monroe 20
  - (20) Brigham Young 14, (3) Oklahoma 13
    - The Sooners' quarterback, 2008 Heisman Trophy winner Sam Bradford, has a sprained right (throwing) shoulder and is expected to miss 2 to 4 weeks.
  - (4) USC 56, San Jose State 3
  - (5) Alabama 34, (7) Virginia Tech 24
  - (6) Ohio State 31, Navy 27
  - (9) Penn State 31, Akron 7
  - (9) Oklahoma State 24, (13) Georgia 10

==== Australian rules football ====
- AFL finals series:
  - Qualifying Final 2 in Melbourne:
    - **Geelong** 14.12 (96) – 12.10 (82) Western Bulldogs
  - Elimination Final 2 in Brisbane:
    - **Brisbane Lions** 16.15 (111) – 15.14 (104) Carlton

==== Auto racing ====
- Nationwide Series:
  - Degree Men V12 300 in Hampton, Georgia:
    - (1) Kevin Harvick (California) (Chevrolet, Kevin Harvick Incorporated) (2) Kyle Busch (Nevada) (Toyota, Joe Gibbs Racing) (3) Dale Earnhardt Jr. (North Carolina) (Chevrolet, JR Motorsports)

==== Basketball ====
- Americas Championship in San Juan, Puerto Rico:
  - Semifinals:
    - Brazil 73–65 Canada
    - Puerto Rico 85–80 Argentina

==== Cue sports ====
- World Cup of Pool in Quezon City, Philippines:
  - Quarterfinals:
    - (9) Fu Jianbo/Li Hewen (CHN) def. (1) Rodney Morris/Shane Van Boening (USA) 9–5
    - (5) Francisco Bustamante/Efren Reyes (PHI) def. (4) Darren Appleton/Imran Majid (ENG) 9–1
    - (3) Thorsten Hohmann/Ralf Souquet (GER) def. (6) Niels Feijen/Nick van den Berg (NED) 9–7
    - (2) Ronato Alcano/Dennis Orcollo (PHI) def. (10) Radosław Babica/Mateusz Śniegocki (POL) 9–5

==== Cycling ====
- Vuelta a España:
  - Stage 7 – Valencia, 30 km (ITT): (1) Fabian Cancellara (SUI) (Team Saxo Bank) 36' 41" (2) David Millar (GBR) (Garmin–Slipstream) + 32" (3) Bert Grabsch (GER) (Team Columbia–HTC) + 36"
  - General classification: (1) Cancellara 24h 58' 12" (2) Tom Boonen (BEL) (Quick-Step) + 51" (3) David Herrero (ESP) (Xacobeo–Galicia) + 59"
- Mountain Bike World Championships in Canberra, Australia:
  - Cross-country men: (gold) Nino Schurter (SUI) 2h 04' 39" (silver) Julien Absalon (FRA) + 3" (bronze) Florian Vogel (SUI) + 58"
  - Cross-country women: (gold) Irina Kalentieva (RUS) 1h 43' 20" (silver) Lene Byberg (NOR) + 13" (bronze) Willow Koerber (USA) + 52"

==== Football (soccer) ====
- 2010 FIFA World Cup qualification: (teams in **bold** qualify for 2010 FIFA World Cup)
  - Europe:
    - Group 1:
      - Denmark 1–1 Portugal
      - Hungary 1–2 Sweden
        - Standings (after 7 matches): Denmark 17 points, Hungary 13, Sweden 12, Portugal 10.
    - Group 2:
      - Moldova 0–0 Luxembourg
      - Switzerland 2–0 Greece
      - Israel 0–1 Latvia
        - Standings (after 7 matches): Switzerland 16 points, Greece, Latvia 13.
    - Group 3:
      - Slovakia 2–2 Czech Republic
      - Poland 1–1 Northern Ireland
        - Standings (after 7 matches): Slovakia 16 points, Northern Ireland 14 (8 matches), Poland, Slovenia 11.
    - Group 4:
      - Russia 3–0 Liechtenstein
      - Azerbaijan 1–2 Finland
        - Standings (after 7 matches): Germany 19 points, Russia 18, Finland 13.
    - Group 5:
      - Armenia 0–2 Bosnia and Herzegovina
      - Turkey 4–2 Estonia
      - Spain 5–0 Belgium
        - Standings (after 7 matches): Spain 21 points, Bosnia-Herzegovina 15, Turkey 11.
    - Group 6:
      - Ukraine 5–0 Andorra
      - Croatia 1–0 Belarus
        - Standings (after 7 matches): England 21 points, Croatia 17 (8 matches), Ukraine 14.
    - Group 7:
      - Austria 3–1 Faroe Islands
      - France 1–1 Romania
        - Standings (after 7 matches): Serbia 18 points, France 14, Austria 10.
    - Group 8:
      - Bulgaria 4–1 Montenegro
      - Cyprus 1–2 Republic of Ireland
      - Georgia 0–2 Italy
        - Standings (after 7 matches): Italy 17 points, Ireland 16 (8 matches), Bulgaria 11.
    - Group 9:
      - Scotland 2–0 Macedonia
      - Iceland 1–1 Norway
        - Standings (after 7 matches, one match remaining): **Netherlands** 21 points, Scotland 10, Norway, Macedonia 7.
  - South America round 15:
    - Peru 1–0 Uruguay
    - Colombia 2–0 Ecuador
    - Paraguay 1–0 Bolivia
    - Argentina 1–3 **Brazil**
    - Chile 2–2 Venezuela
      - Standings: Brazil 30 points, Chile, Paraguay 27, Argentina 22, Colombia, Ecuador 20, Uruguay, Venezuela 18.
  - Africa third round, matchday 4:
    - Group A:
      - Gabon 0–2 Cameroon
        - Standings (after 3 matches): Gabon 6 points, Cameroon, Togo 4, Morocco 2.
    - Group C:
      - Rwanda 0–1 Egypt
        - Standings: Algeria 7 points (3 matches), Egypt 7 (4), Zambia 4 (3), Rwanda 1 (4).
    - Group E:
      - Malawi 2–1 Guinea
      - Ivory Coast 5–0 Burkina Faso
        - Standings (after 4 matches): Côte d'Ivoire 12 points, Burkina Faso 6, Guinea, Malawi 3.
        - Côte d'Ivoire all but mathematically qualify for 2010 FIFA World Cup.
  - North & Central America fourth round, matchday 7:
    - United States 2–1 El Salvador
    - Honduras 4–1 Trinidad and Tobago
    - Costa Rica 0–3 Mexico
      - Standings: Honduras, United States 13 points, Mexico, Costa Rica 12, El Salvador, Trinidad and Tobago 5.
  - Asia fifth round, first leg:
    - Bahrain 0–0 Saudi Arabia
- Friendly international matches:
  - Netherlands 3–0 Japan
  - South Korea 3–1 Australia
  - England 2–1 Slovenia
  - Germany 2–0 South Africa

==== Rugby union ====
- Tri Nations Series:
  - Australia 21–6 South Africa in Brisbane
    - Australia win their first match of the tournament and South Africa suffer their first loss.
    - Standings: South Africa 17 points (5 matches), New Zealand 8 (4), Australia 7 (5).

==== Tennis ====
- US Open, day 6: (seeding in parentheses)
  - Men's singles, third round:
    - Roger Federer (SUI) [1] def. Lleyton Hewitt (AUS) [31] 4–6, 6–3, 7–5, 6–4
    - Novak Djokovic (SRB) [4] def. Jesse Witten (USA) 6–7(2), 6–3, 7–6(2), 6–4
    - John Isner (USA) def. Andy Roddick (USA) [5] 7–6(3), 6–3, 3–6, 5–7, 7–6(5)
    - Nikolay Davydenko (RUS) [8] def. Marco Chiudinelli (SUI) 6–4, 7–5, 7–5
    - Fernando Verdasco (ESP) [10] def. Tommy Haas (GER) [20] 3–6, 7–5, 7–6(8), 1–6, 6–4
  - Women's singles, third round:
    - Petra Kvitová (CZE) def. Dinara Safina (RUS) [1] 6–4, 2–6, 7–6(5)
    - Svetlana Kuznetsova (RUS) [6] def. Shahar Pe'er (ISR) 7–5, 6–1
    - Caroline Wozniacki (DEN) [9] def. Sorana Cîrstea (ROU) [24] 6–3, 6–2

==== Volleyball ====
- European Men's Championship in İzmir and İstanbul, Turkey: (teams in **bold** advance to the second round)
  - Pool A in Izmir:
    - France 3–1 Germany
    - Turkey 0–3 **Poland**
      - Standings: Poland 6 points (3 matches), Germany 4 (3), France 3 (2), Turkey 2 (2).
  - Pool B in Istanbul:
    - **Russia** 3–2 **Netherlands**
    - **Finland** 3–0 Estonia
      - Standings: Netherlands 5 points (3 matches), Russia 4 (2), Finland 3 (2), Estonia 3 (3).
  - Pool C in Izmir:
    - **Slovakia** 2–3 **Greece**
      - Standings (after 2 matches): Greece 4 points, Slovakia, Spain 3, Slovenia 2.
  - Pool D in Istanbul:
    - Czech Republic 0–3 Italy
      - Standings (after 2 matches): **Bulgaria** 4 points, **Serbia**, Italy 3, Czech Republic 2.
- Asian Women's Championship in Hanoi, Vietnam:
  - Pool A:
    - Iran 3–0 Sri Lanka
    - Vietnam 3–0 Australia
  - Pool B:
    - Japan 3–0 Chinese Taipei
  - Pool C:
    - China 3–0 Kazakhstan
  - Pool D:
    - Indonesia 0–3 South Korea
    - India 0–3 Thailand

=== September 4, 2009 (Friday) ===
==== Athletics ====
- Golden League:
  - Memorial Van Damme in Brussels, Belgium: (GL indicates Golden League event, athletes in **bold** share the US$1 million jackpot)
    - Men:
      - 100 Metres GL: (gold) Asafa Powell (JAM) 9.90
      - 200 Metres: (gold) Usain Bolt (JAM) 19.57
      - 400 Metres GL: (gold) Jeremy Wariner (USA) 44.94
      - 800 Metres: (gold) David Rudisha (KEN) 1:45.80
      - 5000 Metres GL: (gold) **Kenenisa Bekele** (ETH) 12:55.33
      - 3000 Metres Steeplechase: (gold) Paul Kipsiele Koech (KEN) 8:04.05
      - 110 Metres Hurdles GL: (gold) Ryan Brathwaite (BAR) 13.30
      - Javelin Throw GL: (gold) Tero Pitkämäki (FIN) 86.23
      - 4x1500 Metres Relay: (gold) Kenya 14:36.23 WR
    - Women:
      - 100 Metres GL: (gold) Carmelita Jeter (USA) 10.88
      - 400 Metres GL: (gold) **Sanya Richards** (USA) 48.83
      - 800 Metres: (gold) Anna Willard (USA) 1:59.14
      - 2000 Metres: (gold) Gelete Burika (ETH) 5:30.19
      - 100 Metres Hurdles GL: (gold) Brigitte Foster-Hylton (JAM) 12.48
      - High Jump GL: (gold) Blanka Vlašić (CRO) 2.00
      - Pole Vault GL: (gold) **Elena Isinbaeva** (RUS) 4.70
      - Triple Jump: (gold) Yamilé Aldama (SUD) 14.27

==== Australian rules football ====
- AFL finals series
  - Elimination Final 1 in West Lakes, South Australia
    - **Adelaide** 26.10 (166)–10.10 (70) Essendon

==== Basketball ====
- Americas Championship in San Juan, Puerto Rico: (teams in **bold** advance to the semifinals and qualify for 2010 World Championship)
  - Quarter Final Round:
    - Panama 67–74 Mexico
    - **Argentina** 73–66 Uruguay
    - Dominican Republic 76–80 **Canada**
    - **Brazil** 82–86 **Puerto Rico**
      - Final standings: Brazil, Puerto Rico, Argentina 13 points; Canada, Dominican Republic 10; Uruguay 9; Mexico, Panama 8.

==== Cricket ====
- Australia in England:
  - 1st ODI at The Oval, London:
    - Australia 260/5 (50 ov); England 256/8 (50.0 ov). **Australia win by 4 runs. Australia lead the 7-match series 1–0**.
- New Zealand in Sri Lanka:
  - 2nd T20I in Colombo:
    - New Zealand 170/4 (20/20 ov); Sri Lanka 148/8 (20.0/20 ov). **New Zealand win by 22 runs. New Zealand win the 2-match series 2–0**.

==== Cycling ====
- Vuelta a España:
  - Stage 6 – Xàtiva, 186 km: (1) Borut Božič (SLO) (Vacansoleil) 4h 40' 50" (2) Tyler Farrar (USA) (Garmin–Slipstream) + 0" (3) Daniele Bennati (ITA) (Liquigas) + 0"
  - General classification: (1) André Greipel (GER) (Team Columbia–HTC) 24h 21' 13" (2) Tom Boonen (BEL) (Quick-Step) + 6" (3) Bennati + 9"
- Mountain Bike World Championships in Canberra, Australia:
  - Four-cross men: (gold) Jared Graves (AUS) (silver) Romain Saladini (FRA) (bronze) Jakub Riha (CZE)
  - Four-cross women: (gold) Caroline Buchanan (AUS) (silver) Jill Kintner (USA) (bronze) Melissa Buhl (USA)

==== Football (soccer) ====
- Women's Euro in Finland:
  - Quarter-finals:
    - Germany 2–1 Italy
    - Sweden 1–3 Norway

==== Tennis ====
- US Open, day 5: (seeding in parentheses)
  - Men's singles, second round:
    - Andy Murray (GBR) [2] def. Paul Capdeville (CHI) 6–2, 3–6, 6–0, 6–2
    - Rafael Nadal (ESP) [3] def. Nicolas Kiefer (GER) 6–0, 3–6, 6–3, 6–4
    - Juan Martín del Potro (ARG) [6] def. Jürgen Melzer (AUT) 7–6(6), 6–3, 6–3
    - Jo-Wilfried Tsonga (FRA) [7] def. Jarkko Nieminen (FIN) 7–5, 6–3, 6–4
    - Gilles Simon (FRA) [9] def. Thomaz Bellucci (BRA) 6–3, 6–2, 6–4
  - Women's singles, third round:
    - Serena Williams (USA) [2] def. María José Martínez Sánchez (ESP) 6–3, 7–5
    - Venus Williams (USA) [3] def. Magdaléna Rybáriková (SVK) 6–2, 7–5
    - Vera Zvonareva (RUS) [7] def. Elena Vesnina (RUS) [31] 6–2, 6–4
    - Francesca Schiavone (ITA) [26] def. Victoria Azarenka (BLR) [8] 4–6, 6–2, 6–2
    - Flavia Pennetta (ITA) [10] def. Aleksandra Wozniak (CAN) 6–1, 6–1

==== Volleyball ====
- European Men's Championship in İzmir and İstanbul, Turkey: (teams in **bold** advance to the second round)
  - Pool A in Izmir:
    - **Poland** 3–1 Germany
  - Pool B in Istanbul:
    - **Netherlands** 3–1 Estonia
  - Pool C in Izmir:
    - Greece 3–0 Spain
    - Slovenia 0–3 Slovakia
  - Pool D in Istanbul:
    - Serbia 3–0 Czech Republic
    - Italy 0–3 **Bulgaria**

=== September 3, 2009 (Thursday) ===
==== American football ====
- College football:
  - NCAA AP Top 25:
    - (14) Boise State 19, (16) Oregon 8
      - The Broncos' win on their famous blue turf is marred by a post-game incident which saw Oregon running back LeGarrette Blount punch Boise State linebacker/defensive end Byron Hout and attempt to go into the stands to confront heckling fans.
- NFL news:
  - NFL commissioner Roger Goodell rules that Philadelphia Eagles quarterback Michael Vick will be eligible to play in week 3 of the regular season. (ESPN)

==== Basketball ====
- Americas Championship in San Juan, Puerto Rico: (teams in **bold** advance to the semifinals and qualify for 2010 World Championship)
  - Quarter Final Round:
    - Canada 97–65 Panama
    - Mexico 73–86 Dominican Republic
    - Uruguay 62–82 **Brazil**
    - **Puerto Rico** 78–80 **Argentina**
      - Standings (after 6 games): Brazil 12 points, Argentina, Puerto Rico 11, Dominican Republic 9, Uruguay, Canada 8, Panama 7, Mexico 6.

==== Cycling ====
- Vuelta a España:
  - Stage 5 – Tarragona to Vinaròs, 174 km: (1) André Greipel (GER) (Team Columbia–HTC) 4h 27' 54" (2) Tom Boonen (BEL) (Quick-Step) + 0" (3) Daniele Bennati (ITA) (Liquigas) + 0"
  - General classification: (1) Greipel 19h 40' 23" (2) Boonen + 6" (3) Fabian Cancellara (SWI) (Team Saxo Bank) + 9"

==== Football (soccer) ====
- Women's Euro in Finland:
  - Quarter-finals:
    - Finland 2–3 England
    - Netherlands 0–0 (ET) France. Netherlands win 5–4 in penalty shootout
- News:
  - English Premier League football club Chelsea F.C. is banned from registering players on transfer during their next two transfer windows by FIFA for inducing Gaël Kakuta to illegally break his contract with French Ligue 1 club RC Lens in 2007. They will be unable to transfer players in until January 2011.
    - Chelsea F.C. must pay restitution to RC Lens of €130,000 (£113,000) for Kakuta's breach of contract.
    - Kakuta himself is suspended from playing at any level by FIFA for four months, and fined €780,000 (£680,000).
    - Chelsea captain John Terry states the club will appeal the ban and fines.
  - Following the successful claim by RC Lens, French Ligue 2 club Le Havre AC announces they are considering filing a complaint with FIFA against Manchester United F.C. over their signing of Le Havre academy player Paul Pogba. Pogba's signing has not yet been approved by FIFA.

==== Snooker ====
- Premier League Snooker – League phase, in Penrith, Cumbria
  - Neil Robertson (AUS) 4–2 Judd Trump (ENG)
  - Ronnie O'Sullivan (ENG) 4–2 Marco Fu (HKG)
    - Standings: Ronnie O'Sullivan, Neil Robertson 2 points; Judd Trump, John Higgins, Stephen Hendry, Marco Fu, Shaun Murphy 0.

==== Tennis ====
- US Open, day 4: (seeding in parentheses)
  - Men's singles, second round:
    - Novak Djokovic (SRB) [4] def. Carsten Ball (AUS) 6–3, 6–4, 6–4
    - Andy Roddick (USA) [5] def. Marc Gicquel (FRA) 6–1, 6–4, 6–4
    - Nikolay Davydenko (RUS) [8] def. Jan Hernych (CZE) 6–4, 6–1, 6–2
    - Fernando Verdasco (ESP) [10] def. Florent Serra (FRA) 6–3, 6–0, 6–3
  - Women's singles, second round:
    - Dinara Safina (RUS) [1] def. Kristina Barrois (GER) 6–7(5), 6–2, 6–3
    - Melanie Oudin (USA) def. Elena Dementieva (RUS) [4] 5–7, 6–4, 6–3
    - Yaroslava Shvedova (KAZ) def. Jelena Janković (SRB) [5] 6–3, 6–7(4), 7–6(6)
    - Svetlana Kuznetsova (RUS) [6] def. Anastasija Sevastova (LAT) 6–4, 6–2
    - Caroline Wozniacki (DEN) [9] def. Petra Martić (CRO) 6–1, 6–0

==== Volleyball ====
- European Men's Championship in İzmir and İstanbul, Turkey:
  - Pool A in Izmir:
    - Poland 3–1 France
    - Germany 3–2 Turkey
  - Pool B in Istanbul:
    - Estonia 1–3 Russia
    - Netherlands 3–2 Finland
  - Pool C in Izmir:
    - Spain 3–0 Slovenia
  - Pool D in Istanbul:
    - Bulgaria 3–2 Serbia

=== September 2, 2009 (Wednesday) ===
==== Basketball ====
- Americas Championship in San Juan, Puerto Rico (teams in **bold** advance to the semifinals and qualify for 2010 World Championship)
  - Quarter Final Round:
    - **Brazil** 68–59 Canada
    - Panama 83–77 Uruguay
    - Argentina 77–65 Mexico
    - Dominican Republic 76–85 **Puerto Rico**
      - Standings after 5 games: Puerto Rico, Brazil 10 points; Argentina 9; Dominican Republic, Uruguay 7; Canada, Panama 6; Mexico 5.

==== Cricket ====
- New Zealand in Sri Lanka:
  - 1st T20I in Colombo:
    - New Zealand 141/8 (20.0/20 ov); Sri Lanka 138/9 (20.0/20 ov). **New Zealand win by 3 runs. New Zealand lead the 2-match series 1–0**.

==== Football (soccer) ====
- Copa Sudamericana First Stage, first leg:
  - Atlético Paranaense (Brazil) 0–0 (Brazil) Botafogo
- US Open Cup Final in Washington, D.C.:
  - **Seattle Sounders FC** 2–1 D.C. United

==== Tennis ====
- US Open, day 3: (seeding in parentheses)
  - Men's singles, first round:
    - Rafael Nadal (ESP) [3] def. Richard Gasquet (FRA) 6–2, 6–2, 6–3
    - Juan Martín del Potro (ARG) [6] def. Juan Mónaco (ARG) 6–3, 6–3, 6–1
    - Gilles Simon (FRA) [9] def. Daniel Gimeno Traver (ESP) 6–4, 7–6(3), 6–3
  - Men's singles, second round:
    - Roger Federer (SUI) [1] def. Simon Greul (GER) 6–3, 7–5, 7–5
  - Women's singles, second round:
    - Serena Williams (USA) [2] def. Melinda Czink (HUN) 6–1, 6–1
    - Venus Williams (USA) [3] def. Bethanie Mattek-Sands (USA) 6–4, 6–2
    - Vera Zvonareva (RUS) [7] def. Anna Chakvetadze (RUS) 3–6, 6–1, 6–1
    - Victoria Azarenka (BLR) [8] def. Barbora Záhlavová-Strýcová (CZE) 6–2, 6–1
    - Flavia Pennetta (ITA) [10] def. Sania Mirza (IND) 6–0 6–0

=== September 1, 2009 (Tuesday) ===
==== Basketball ====
- Americas Championship in San Juan, Puerto Rico:
  - Quarter Final Round:
    - Uruguay 74–80 Dominican Republic
    - Canada 51–67 Argentina
    - Mexico 61–92 Brazil
    - Puerto Rico 79–51 Panama
      - Standings (4 games): Puerto Rico, Brazil 8 points, Argentina 7, Dominican Republic, Uruguay 6, Canada 5, Panama, Mexico 4.

==== Cycling ====
- Vuelta a España:
  - Stage 4 – Venlo (Netherlands) to Liège (Belgium), 224 km: (1) André Greipel (GER) (Team Columbia–HTC) 5h 43' 05" (2) Wouter Weylandt (BEL) (Quick-Step) + 0" (3) Bert Grabsch (GER) (Team Columbia–HTC) + 0"
  - General Classification: (1) Fabian Cancellara (SUI) (Team Saxo Bank) 15h 12' 38" (2) Tom Boonen (BEL) (Quick-Step) + 9" (3) Bert Grabsch (GER) (Team Columbia–HTC) + 11"

==== Cricket ====
- Australia in England:
  - 2nd Twenty20 in Manchester:
    - **Match abandoned without a ball bowled. 2-match series drawn 0–0**.
- Afghanistan in Netherlands:
  - 2nd ODI in Amstelveen:
    - Netherlands 231/7 (50 ov); Afghanistan 232/4 (46.4 ov, Mohammad Shehzad 110). **Afghanistan win by 6 wickets. 2-match series drawn 1–1.**

==== Tennis ====
- US Open, day 2: (seeding in parentheses)
  - Men's singles, first round:
    - Andy Murray (GBR) [2] def. Ernests Gulbis (LAT) 7–5, 6–3, 7–5
    - Novak Djokovic (SRB) [4] def. Ivan Ljubičić (CRO) 6–3, 6–1, 6–3
    - Jo-Wilfried Tsonga (FRA) [7] def. Chase Buchanan (USA) 6–0, 6–2, 6–1
    - Fernando Verdasco (ESP) [10] def. Benjamin Becker (GER) 7–5 6–4 7–5
  - Women's singles, first round:
    - Dinara Safina (RUS) [1] def. Olivia Rogowska (AUS) 6–7(5) 6–2 6–4
    - Elena Dementieva (RUS) [4] def. Camille Pin (FRA) 6–1, 6–2
    - Jelena Janković (SRB) [5] def. Roberta Vinci (ITA) 6–2, 6–3
    - Svetlana Kuznetsova (RUS) [6] def. Julia Görges (GER) 6–3, 6–2
    - Caroline Wozniacki (DEN) [9] def. Galina Voskoboeva (KAZ) 6–4, 6–0
