= October 2009 in sports =

<<	October 2009					>>
Su	Mo	Tu	We	Th	Fr	Sa
				1	2	3
4	5	6	7	8	9	10
11	12	13	14	15	16	17
18	19	20	21	22	23	24
25	26	27	28	29	30	31
Science; Sports

This list shows notable sports-related deaths, events, and notable outcomes that occurred in October of 2009.

== Deaths in October ==
- 24: Bill Chadwick
- 20: Yuri Ryazanov

== Current sporting seasons ==
=== American football 2009 ===
- NFL
- NCAA Division I FBS

=== Auto racing 2009 ===
- Formula One
- Sprint Cup (Chase)
- Formula Two
- Nationwide Series
- Camping World Truck Series
- WTTC
- V8 Supercar
- Superleague Formula
- Super GT

=== Baseball 2009 ===
- Major League Baseball
- Nippon Professional Baseball

=== Basketball 2009 ===
- NBA
- Euroleague
- Eurocup
- ASEAN Basketball League
- Australia
- France
- Germany
- Greece
- Iran
- Israel
- Italy
- Philippines
  - Philippine Cup
- Russia
- Spain
- Turkey

=== Canadian football 2009 ===
- Canadian Football League

=== Football (soccer) 2009 ===
National teams competitions

- 2010 FIFA World Cup Qualifying
- 2011 FIFA Women's World Cup qualification (UEFA)

International clubs competitions

- UEFA (Europe) Champions League
- Europa League
- UEFA Women's Champions League
- Copa Sudamericana
- AFC (Asia) Champions League
- AFC Cup
- CAF (Africa) Champions League
- CAF Confederation Cup
- CONCACAF (North & Central America) Champions League

Domestic (national) competitions

- Argentina
- Australia
- Brazil
- England
- France
- Germany
- Iran
- Italy
- Japan
- Norway
- Russia
- Scotland
- Spain
- Major League Soccer (USA & Canada)
  - Playoffs

=== Golf 2009 ===
- European Tour
- PGA Tour
- LPGA Tour
- Champions Tour

=== Ice hockey 2009 ===
- National Hockey League

=== Motorcycle racing 2009 ===
- Moto GP

=== Rugby league 2009 ===
- Four Nations
- European Cup
- Pacific Cup

=== Rugby union 2009 ===
- Heineken Cup
- European Challenge Cup
- English Premiership
- Celtic League
- Top 14
- Currie Cup
- Air New Zealand Cup

=== Winter sports ===
- Alpine Skiing World Cup
- Grand Prix of Figure Skating

== Days of the month ==
=== October 31, 2009 (Saturday) ===
==== American football ====
- NCAA:
  - BCS Top 10 (unbeaten teams in **bold**):
    - Florida vs. Georgia Football Classic in Jacksonville, Florida: (1) **Florida** 41, Georgia 17
    - (3) **Texas** 41, (14) Oklahoma State 14
    - (4) **Iowa** 42, Indiana 24
    - (10) Oregon 47, (5) USC 20
    - (6) **TCU** 41, UNLV 0
    - (7) **Boise State** 45, San Jose State 7
    - (8) **Cincinnati** 28, Syracuse 7
    - (9) LSU 42, Tulane 0
    - Idle: (2) **Alabama**
  - Other games:
    - Tennessee 31, (22) South Carolina 13
    - Auburn 33, (25) Mississippi 20

==== Baseball ====
- Major League Baseball postseason:
  - World Series:
    - Game 3: New York Yankees 8, Philadelphia Phillies 5. **Yankees lead best-of-7 series 2–1.**
- Nippon Professional Baseball postseason:
  - Japan Series:
    - Game 1, Yomiuri Giants 4, Hokkaido Nippon-Ham Fighters 3. **Giants lead best-of-7 series 1–0.**

==== Canadian football ====
- Canadian Interuniversity Sport (CIS Top Ten rankings in parentheses):
  - Ontario University Athletics quarterfinals:
    - (5) Western Ontario Mustangs 37, Guelph Gryphons 16
      - Western advances to play the Wilfrid Laurier Golden Hawks next week in one OUA semifinal on the back of Mustangs QB Michael Faulds' performance.
    - (10) McMaster Marauders 27, (7) Ottawa Gee-Gees 15
      - Though McMaster is the first team in OUA history to have a road playoff game despite a 6–2 regular season record (due to a four-way tie for second at 6–2), the Marauders earn a trip to Queen's University to play the Gaels next week.

==== Cricket ====
- Australia in India:
  - 3rd ODI in Delhi:
    - Australia 229/5 (50 ov); India 230/4 (48.2 ov). **India win by 6 wickets, lead the 7-match series 2–1.**
- Zimbabwe in Bangladesh:
  - 3rd ODI in Mirpur:
    - Zimbabwe 196 (41.1 ov); Bangladesh 198/6 (40.4 ov). **Bangladesh win by 4 wickets, lead the 5-match series 2–1.**

==== Figure skating ====
- ISU Grand Prix:
  - Cup of China in Beijing, China: (skaters in **bold** qualify for the Grand Prix Final)
    - Ladies: (gold) Akiko Suzuki (JPN) 176.66 (silver) Kiira Korpi (FIN) 163.27 (bronze) Joannie Rochette (CAN) 163.18
    - Men: (gold) **Nobunari Oda** (JPN) 239.58 (silver) Evan Lysacek (USA) 232.17 (bronze) Sergei Voronov (RUS) 220.39
    - Pairs: (gold) Xue Shen/Hongbo Zhao (CHN) 200.97 (silver) Zhang Dan/Zhang Hao (CHN) 186.49 (bronze) Tatiana Volosozhar/Stanislav Morozov (UKR) 170.79
    - Ice Dancing: (gold) Tanith Belbin/Benjamin Agosto (USA) 194.51 (silver) Jana Khokhlova/Sergei Novitski (RUS) 180.57 (bronze) Federica Faiella/Massimo Scali (ITA) 179.92

==== Football (soccer) ====
- U-17 World Cup in Nigeria: (teams in **bold** advance to the round of 16)
  - Group C:
    - Gambia 2–2 **Colombia**
    - Netherlands 0–1 **Iran**
      - Final standings: Iran 7 points, Colombia 5, Netherlands 3, Gambia 1.
  - Group D:
    - **Burkina Faso** 4–1 Costa Rica
    - **New Zealand** 1–1 **Turkey**
      - Final standings: Turkey 7 points, Burkina Faso 4, New Zealand 3, Costa Rica 1.
- (Finland) Finnish Cup Final in Helsinki:
  - Tampere United 1–2 Inter Turku
    - Inter Turku win the Cup for the first time.
- (United States) MLS Cup Playoffs:
  - Conference semifinals, first leg:
    - Real Salt Lake 1, Columbus Crew 0

==== Golf ====
- PGA Tour:
  - The Viking Classic in Madison, Mississippi is canceled because of unplayable course conditions, making it the first PGA Tour event to be called off due to weather since 1996. Nearly 2 inches (5 cm) of overnight rain compounded the problems on a course that had already received nearly 20 inches (50 cm) of rain in the previous six weeks.

==== Rugby league ====
- Four Nations:
  - Round 2:
    - England 16–26 Australia
    - France 12–62 New Zealand
      - Standings: New Zealand, Australia 3 points, England 2, France 0.
- Pacific Cup:
  - Third place Playoff in Port Moresby:
    - (bronze) Fiji 26–16 Tonga

==== Rugby union ====
- End of year tests:
  - Australia 19–32 New Zealand in Tokyo
    - The All Blacks complete a 4–0 sweep in the Bledisloe Cup series and retain the Cup for the seventh straight year.
- Currie Cup Final in Pretoria:
  - **Blue Bulls** 36–24 Free State Cheetahs
- Air New Zealand Cup Finals:
  - Semifinal 2 in Wellington:
    - **Wellington** 34–21 Southland
- Heartland Championship:
  - Meads Cup Final in Christchurch:
    - Mid Canterbury 13–34 **Wanganui**
  - Lochore Cup Final in Greymouth:
    - West Coast 13–21 **North Otago**

==== Tennis ====
- WTA Tour:
  - WTA Tour Championships in Doha, Qatar:
    - Semifinals:
      - (2) Serena Williams (USA) def. (4) Caroline Wozniacki (DEN) 6–4 0–1 (retired)
      - (7) Venus Williams (USA) def. (8) Jelena Janković (SRB) 5–7 6–3 6–4

=== October 30, 2009 (Friday) ===
==== American football ====
- NCAA BCS Top 25
  - South Florida 30, (21) West Virginia 19

==== Figure skating ====
- ISU Grand Prix:
  - Cup of China in Beijing, China:
    - Ladies – Short Program: (1) Mirai Nagasu (USA) 62.20 (2) Kiira Korpi (FIN) 61.20 (3) Carolina Kostner (ITA) 61.12
    - Men – Short Program: (1) Nobunari Oda (JPN) 83.35 (2) Sergei Voronov (RUS) 81.40 (3) Evan Lysacek (USA) 80.80
    - Pairs – Short Program: (1) Shen Xue/Zhao Hongbo (CHN) 72.28 (2) Tatiana Volosozhar/Stanislav Morozov (UKR) 62.98 (3) Lubov Iliushechkina/Nodari Maisuradze (RUS) 62.54
      - This is the first competition for Shen and Zhao since they won the 2007 World Championships.
    - Ice Dancing – after Compulsory and Original Dance: (1) Tanith Belbin/Benjamin Agosto (USA) 98.66 (2) Jana Khokhlova/Sergei Novitski (RUS) 92.78 (3) Federica Faiella/Massimo Scali (ITA) 89.96

==== Football (soccer) ====
- U-17 World Cup in Nigeria: (teams in **bold** advance to the round of 16)
  - Group A:
    - Germany 3–1 Honduras
    - **Argentina** 1–2 **Nigeria**
      - Final standings: Nigeria 7 points, Argentina 6, Germany 4, Honduras 0.
  - Group B:
    - Japan 0–2 **Mexico**
    - **Switzerland** 1–0 Brazil
      - Final standings: Switzerland 9 points, Mexico 6, Brazil 3, Japan 0.

==== Rugby union ====
- Air New Zealand Cup Finals:
  - Semifinal 1 in Christchurch:
    - **Canterbury** 20–3 Hawke's Bay

==== Tennis ====
- WTA Tour:
  - WTA Tour Championships in Doha, Qatar: (players in **bold** advance to the semifinals)
    - White Group:
      - (8) **Jelena Janković** (SRB) def. (4) **Caroline Wozniacki** (DEN) 6–2 6–2
      - Agnieszka Radwańska (POL) def. (6) Victoria Azarenka (BLR) 4–6 7–5 4–1 (retired)
        - Final standings: Janković, Wozniacki 2 wins, Radwańska, Azarenka 1 win.
    - Maroon Group:
      - (3) Svetlana Kuznetsova (RUS) def. (5) Elena Dementieva (RUS) 6–3 6–2
        - Final standings: **Serena Williams** 3 wins, **Venus Williams**, Kuznetsova, Dementieva 1 win.

=== October 29, 2009 (Thursday) ===
==== American football ====
- NCAA BCS Top 25
  - North Carolina 20, (13) Virginia Tech 17
    - The Tar Heels spring the upset in Blacksburg with Casey Barth's 21-yard field goal as time expires.

==== Baseball ====
- Major League Baseball postseason:
  - World Series:
    - Game 2: New York Yankees 3, Philadelphia Phillies 1. **Best-of-7 series tied 1–1.**

==== Basketball ====
- Euroleague:
  - Regular Season Game 2: (unbeaten teams in **bold**)
    - Group A:
      - **Montepaschi Siena** (Italy) 84–64 (Lithuania) Žalgiris
      - **Regal FC Barcelona** (Spain) 81–59 (Croatia) Cibona
    - Group B:
      - Efes Pilsen (Turkey) 77–67 (Serbia) Partizan
      - Orléans (France) 62–69 (Lithuania) **Lietuvos Rytas**
    - Group C:
      - Caja Laboral Baskonia (Spain) 86–81 (Israel) Maccabi Tel Aviv
      - Union Olimpija Ljubljana (Slovenia) 75–81 (Greece) Maroussi
    - Group D:
      - **Panathinaikos** (Greece) 101–66 (Russia) Khimki

==== Cricket ====
- Zimbabwe in Bangladesh:
  - 2nd ODI in Mirpur:
    - Zimbabwe 219 (47.2 ov); Bangladesh 221/3 (29.3 ov, Shakib Al Hasan 105*). **Bangladesh win by 7 wickets. 5-match series level 1–1**.

==== Football (soccer) ====
- U-17 World Cup in Nigeria: (teams in **bold** advance to the round of 16)
  - Group D:
    - **Turkey** 4–1 Costa Rica
      - Standings: Turkey 6 points, New Zealand 2, Burkina Faso, Costa Rica 1.
  - Group E:
    - United States 1–0 Malawi
    - United Arab Emirates 1–3 **Spain**
      - Standings: Spain 6 points, UAE, USA 3, Malawi 0.
  - Group F:
    - **Italy** 2–1 (South Korea) Korea Republic
    - Uruguay 2–0 Algeria
      - Standings: Italy 6 points, Korea, Uruguay 3, Algeria 0.
- 2011 FIFA Women's World Cup qualification (UEFA):
  - Group 2: Netherlands 13–1 Macedonia
    - Standings: Norway 6 points (2 matches), Netherlands, Slovakia 3 (2), Belarus 3 (1).
  - Group 3: Scotland 3–1 Georgia
    - Standings: Denmark 7 points (3 matches), Scotland 6 (2), Greece 3 (3).
  - Group 4: Bosnia and Herzegovina 0–4 Poland
    - Standings: Poland 9 points (4 matches), Hungary 7 (3), Romania 4 (3), Ukraine 3 (2).
  - Group 5: Austria 0–1 Spain
    - Standings: Spain 9 points (3 matches), England 3 (1).
  - Group 6: Kazakhstan 1–2 Republic of Ireland
    - Standings: Russia 6 points (2 matches), Switzerland 6 (3), Ireland 6 (4), Israel 3 (2).
- Women's international friendly:
  - Germany 0–1 United States in Augsburg
- (United States) MLS Cup Playoffs:
  - Conference semifinals, first leg:
    - Seattle Sounders FC 0, Houston Dynamo 0

==== Snooker ====
- Premier League Snooker – League phase in Preston, Lancashire:
  - John Higgins 4–2 Neil Robertson
  - Shaun Murphy 3–3 Stephen Hendry
    - Standings: Ronnie O'Sullivan, John Higgins 6 points; Stephen Hendry 5; Judd Trump 4; Neil Robertson, Shaun Murphy 3; Marco Fu 1.

==== Tennis ====
- WTA Tour:
  - WTA Tour Championships in Doha, Qatar: (players in **bold** advance to the semifinals)
    - White Group:
      - (4) Caroline Wozniacki (DEN) def. (ALT) Vera Zvonareva (RUS) 6–0 6–7(3) 6–4
    - Maroon Group:
      - (2) **Serena Williams** (USA) def. (5) Elena Dementieva (RUS) 6–2 6–4
      - (7) Venus Williams (USA) def. (3) Svetlana Kuznetsova (RUS) 6–2 6–7(3) 6–4

=== October 28, 2009 (Wednesday) ===
==== Baseball ====
- Major League Baseball postseason:
  - World Series:
    - Game 1: Philadelphia Phillies 6, New York Yankees 1. **Phillies lead best-of-7 series 1–0.**
      - Two home runs from Chase Utley stake the Phils to a lead, and Cliff Lee throws a 10-strikeout, no-walk complete game without giving up an earned run, a feat never before accomplished in the World Series.

==== Basketball ====
- Euroleague:
  - Regular Season Game 2: (unbeaten teams in **bold**)
    - Group A:
      - ASVEL Villeurbanne (France) 76–78 (OT) (Turkey) Fenerbahçe Ülker
    - Group B:
      - **Unicaja Málaga** (Spain) 86–68 (Greece) Olympiacos
    - Group C:
      - CSKA Moscow (Russia) 69–72 (Italy) **Lottomatica Roma**
    - Group D:
      - EWE Baskets Oldenburg (Germany) 70–79 (Italy) Armani Jeans Milano
      - Real Madrid (Spain) 94–72 (Poland) Asseco Prokom Gdynia

==== Cricket ====
- Australia in India:
  - 2nd ODI in Nagpur:
    - India 354/7 (50 ov, Mahendra Singh Dhoni 124); Australia 255 (48.3 ov). **India win by 99 runs. 7-match series level 1–1.**

==== Football (soccer) ====
- U-17 World Cup in Nigeria: (teams in **bold** advance to the round of 16)
  - Group C:
    - Netherlands 2–1 Gambia
    - Iran 0–0 Colombia
      - Standings: Iran, Colombia 4 points, Netherlands 3, Gambia 0.
  - Group D:
    - New Zealand 1–1 Burkina Faso
    - Turkey 0–0 Costa Rica suspended after 21 minutes.
      - Standings: Turkey 3 points (1 match), New Zealand 2 (2), Costa Rica 1 (1), Burkina Faso 1 (2).
- AFC Champions League Semi-finals, second leg: (first leg score in parentheses)
  - Nagoya Grampus (Japan) 1–2 (2–6) (Saudi Arabia) **Al-Ittihad**. Al-Ittihad win 8–3 on aggregate.
  - Umm-Salal (Qatar) 1–2 (0–2) (South Korea) **Pohang Steelers**. Pohang Steelers win 4–1 on aggregate.
- 2011 FIFA Women's World Cup qualification (UEFA):
  - Group 1:
    - France 12–0 Estonia
      - Sandrine Soubeyrand becomes the most-capped French player, man or woman, with 143 matches.
    - Northern Ireland 0–1 Iceland
      - Standings: France 9 points (3 matches), Iceland 9 (4), Northern Ireland 3 (2).
  - Group 2: Norway 1–0 Slovakia
    - Standings: Norway 6 points (2 matches), Slovakia 3 (2), Belarus 3 (1).
  - Group 3: Bulgaria 0–0 Denmark
    - Standings: Denmark 7 points (3 matches), Scotland 3 (1), Greece 3 (3).
  - Group 4: Hungary 1–1 Romania
    - Standings: Hungary 7 points (3 matches), Poland 6 (3), Romania 4 (3), Ukraine 3 (2).
  - Group 6: Israel 1–2 Switzerland
    - Standings: Russia 6 points (2 matches), Switzerland 6 (3), Israel 3 (2), Ireland 3 (3).
  - Group 7:
    - Armenia 1–5 Slovenia
    - Portugal 0–1 Finland
      - Standings: Italy, Finland 9 points (3 matches), Slovenia 3 (3).
  - Group 8:
    - Azerbaijan 2–1 Wales
    - Belgium 1–4 Sweden
      - Standings: Sweden 9 points (3 matches), Czech Republic, Azerbaijan 3 (2), Belgium 3 (3), Wales 3 (4).

==== Shooting ====
- World Cup Final (rifle and pistol) in Wuxi, China:
  - Women's 10 metre air pistol:
  - Men's 10 metre air pistol:
  - Men's 50 metre rifle three positions:

==== Tennis ====
- WTA Tour:
  - WTA Tour Championships in Doha, Qatar:
    - White Group:
      - (4) Caroline Wozniacki (DEN) def. (6) Victoria Azarenka (BLR) 1–6 6–4 7–5
      - (8) Jelena Janković (SRB) def. (1) Dinara Safina (RUS) 1–1 retired
        - Safina withdraws from the tournament due to a serious back injury, and will be replaced by Vera Zvonareva. Safina's withdrawal means that Serena Williams will finish the 2009 season as the WTA's #1-ranked player.
    - Maroon Group:
      - (2) Serena Williams (USA) def. (7) Venus Williams (USA) 5–7 6–4 7–6(4)
- Other news:
  - In excerpts from his upcoming autobiography published by The Times and Sports Illustrated, former great Andre Agassi admits to having used methamphetamine in 1997 and lying to the Association of Tennis Professionals to avoid a suspension after testing positive for the drug in the same year. (AP via ESPN)

=== October 27, 2009 (Tuesday) ===
==== Basketball ====
- NBA season opening day:
  - Boston Celtics 95, Cleveland Cavaliers 89
  - Washington Wizards 102, Dallas Mavericks 91
  - Portland Trail Blazers 96, Houston Rockets 87
  - Los Angeles Lakers 99, Los Angeles Clippers 92

==== Cricket ====
- Zimbabwe in Bangladesh:
  - 1st ODI in Mirpur:
    - Bangladesh 186 (46.5 ov); Zimbabwe 189/5 (34.4 ov). **Zimbabwe win by 5 wickets, lead the 5-match series 1–0**.

==== Football (soccer) ====
- U-17 World Cup in Nigeria: (teams in **bold** advance to the round of 16)
  - Group A:
    - **Argentina** 2–1 Germany
    - Nigeria 1–0 Honduras
      - Standings: Argentina 6 points, Nigeria 4, Germany 1, Honduras 0.
  - Group B:
    - **Switzerland** 4–3 Japan
    - Brazil 0–1 Mexico
      - Standings: Switzerland 6 points, Brazil, Mexico 3, Japan 0.

==== Shooting ====
- World Cup Final (rifle and pistol) in Wuxi, China:
  - Men's 50 metre rifle prone:
  - Women's 50 metre rifle three positions:
  - Women's 25 metre pistol:

==== Tennis ====
- WTA Tour:
  - WTA Tour Championships in Doha, Qatar:
    - White Group:
      - (6) Victoria Azarenka (BLR) def. (8) Jelena Janković (SRB) 6–2, 6–3
    - Maroon Group:
      - (5) Elena Dementieva (RUS) def. (7) Venus Williams (USA) 3–6, 7–6(6), 6–2
      - (2) Serena Williams (USA) def. (3) Svetlana Kuznetsova (RUS) 7–6(6), 7–5

=== October 26, 2009 (Monday) ===
==== American football ====
- NFL Week 7:
  - Monday Night Football: Philadelphia Eagles 27, Washington Redskins 17

==== Football (soccer) ====
- U-17 World Cup in Nigeria:
  - Group E:
    - United Arab Emirates 2–0 Malawi
    - Spain 2–1 United States
  - Group F:
    - Uruguay 1–3 South Korea
    - Algeria 0–1 Italy

==== Shooting ====
- World Cup Final (rifle and pistol) in Wuxi, China:
  - Women's 10 metre air rifle: (gold) Wu Liuxi (CHN) 503.5 (400 **EWR**) (silver) Yin Wen (CHN) 503.0 (399) (bronze) Lioubov Galkina (RUS) 500.0 (399)
  - Men's 10 metre air rifle: (gold) Zhu Qinan (CHN) 701.7 (598) (silver) Péter Sidi (HUN) 700.5 (599) (bronze) Henri Häkkinen (FIN) 698.6 (595)
  - Men's 50 metre pistol: (gold) Jin Jong-oh (KOR) 671.8 (575) (silver) João Costa (POR) 658.5 (564) (bronze) Pavol Kopp (SVK) 656.6 (560)
  - Men's 25 metre rapid fire pistol: (gold) Aleksey Klimov (RUS) 783.6 (582) (silver) Christian Reitz (GER) 780.9 (583) (bronze) Teruyoshi Akiyama (JPN) 779.1 (580)

=== October 25, 2009 (Sunday) ===
==== American football ====
- NFL Week 7 (unbeaten teams in **bold**):
  - NFL International Series in London: New England Patriots 35, Tampa Bay Buccaneers 7
  - **Indianapolis Colts** 42, St. Louis Rams 6
  - San Diego Chargers 37, Kansas City Chiefs 7
  - Green Bay Packers 31, Cleveland Browns 3
  - Houston Texans 24, San Francisco 49ers 21
  - Pittsburgh Steelers 27, Minnesota Vikings 17
    - The Steelers return a fumble and a Brett Favre interception for touchdowns to hand the Vikings their first loss.
  - Buffalo Bills 20, Carolina Panthers 9
  - New York Jets 38, Oakland Raiders 0
  - Dallas Cowboys 37, Atlanta Falcons 21
  - Cincinnati Bengals 45, Chicago Bears 10
  - **New Orleans Saints** 46, Miami Dolphins 34
    - The Saints rally from a 21-point deficit in the second quarter to score their sixth straight win.
  - Sunday Night Football: Arizona Cardinals 24, New York Giants 17
  - Bye week: Baltimore Ravens, **Denver Broncos**, Detroit Lions, Jacksonville Jaguars, Seattle Seahawks, Tennessee Titans

==== Alpine skiing ====
- World Cup:
  - Men's GS in Sölden, Austria:
    - (gold) Didier Cuche (SUI) 2:21.45 (silver) Ted Ligety (USA) 2:22.05 (bronze) Carlo Janka (SUI) 2:22.40

==== Auto racing ====
- Chase for the Sprint Cup:
  - TUMS Fast Relief 500 in Ridgeway, Virginia: (1) Denny Hamlin (Toyota, Joe Gibbs Racing) (2) Jimmie Johnson (California) (Chevrolet, Hendrick Motorsports) (3) Juan Pablo Montoya (Colombia) (Chevrolet, Earnhardt Ganassi Racing)
    - Drivers' standings (with 4 races remaining): (1) Johnson 6098 points (2) Mark Martin (Arkansas) (Chevrolet, Hendrick Motorsports) 5980 (−118) (3) Jeff Gordon (California) (Chevrolet, Hendrick Motorsports) 5948 (−150)
- V8 Supercars:
  - V8 Supercar Challenge in Surfers Paradise, Queensland:
    - Race 20: (1) Mark Winterbottom (AUS) (Ford Falcon) (2) Garth Tander (AUS) (Holden Commodore) (3) James Courtney (AUS) (Ford Falcon)
      - Drivers' standings (after 20 of 26 races): (1) Jamie Whincup (AUS) (Ford Falcon) 2604 points (2) Will Davison (AUS) (Holden Commodore) 2572 (3) Tander 2315
- World Rally Championship:
  - Rally of Great Britain: (1) Sébastien Loeb (FRA) (Citroën C4 WRC) 3:16:25.4 (2) Mikko Hirvonen (FIN) (Ford Focus RS WRC 09) +1:06.1 (3) Dani Sordo (ESP) (Citroën C4 WRC) +1:07.1
    - Final drivers' standings: (1) Loeb 93 points (2) Hirvonen 92 (3) Sordo 64
      - Loeb wins his sixth straight championship title.
    - Final manufacturers' standings: (1) Citroën Total 167 (2) BP Ford 140 (3) Stobart M-Sport 80

==== Badminton ====
- BWF Super Series:
  - Denmark Super Series in Odense:
    - Women's doubles: Pan Pan/Zhang Yawen (CHN) [6] def. Kamilla Rytter Juhl/Lena Frier Kristiansen (DEN) [2] 22–20 18–21 21–12
    - Women's singles: Tine Rasmussen (DEN) [2] def. Wang Yihan (CHN) [1] 21–18 19–21 21–14
    - Mixed doubles: Joachim Fischer Nielsen/Christinna Pedersen (DEN) [2] def. Anthony Clark/Donna Kellogg (ENG) [7] 21–16 25–27 21–17
    - Men's doubles: Koo Kien Keat/Tan Boon Heong (MAS) [2] def. Mathias Boe/Carsten Mogensen (DEN) [3] 20–22 21–14 21–17
    - Men's singles: Simon Santoso (INA) [5] def. Marc Zwiebler (GER) 21–14 21–6

==== Baseball ====
- Major League Baseball postseason:
  - ALCS:
    - Game 6: New York Yankees 5, Los Angeles Angels of Anaheim 2. **Yankees win best-of-7 series 4–2.**

==== Cricket ====
- Australia in India:
  - 1st ODI in Vadodara:
    - Australia 292/8 (50 ov); India 288/8 (50.0 ov). **Australia win by 4 runs, lead the 7-match series 1–0**

==== Football (soccer) ====
- U-17 World Cup in Nigeria:
  - Group C:
    - Iran 2–0 Gambia
    - Colombia 2–1 Netherlands
  - Group D:
    - Turkey 1–0 Burkina Faso
    - Costa Rica 1–1 New Zealand
- 2011 FIFA Women's World Cup qualification (UEFA):
  - Group 2: Macedonia 1–6 Belarus
    - Standings: Slovakia, Belarus, Norway 3 points (1 match).
  - Group 4: Ukraine 7–0 Bosnia and Herzegovina
    - Standings: Hungary 6 points (2 matches), Poland 6 (3), Ukraine, Romania 3 (2).
  - Group 5: England 8–0 Malta
    - Standings: Spain 6 points (2 matches), England 3 (1).
  - Group 6: Russia 3–0 Republic of Ireland
    - Standings: Russia 6 points (2 matches), Switzerland 3 (2), Israel 3 (1), Ireland 3 (3).
  - Group 8: Czech Republic 2–1 Wales
    - Standings: Sweden 6 points (2 matches), Belgium 3 (2), Wales 3 (3), Czech Republic 3 (2).

==== Golf ====
- PGA Tour:
  - Fall Series:
    - Frys.com Open in Scottsdale, Arizona:
      - Winner: Troy Matteson (USA) 262 (−18) PO
        - Matteson beats fellow Americans Rickie Fowler and Jamie Lovemark on the second playoff hole to win his second PGA Tour title, after the 2006 Frys.com Open, an event now known as the Justin Timberlake Shriners Hospitals for Children Open. Earlier in the tournament he sets a 36-hole PGA Tour record of 122 with consecutive rounds of 61.
- European Tour:
  - Castelló Masters Costa Azahar in Castellón, Spain:
    - Winner: Michael Jonzon (SWE) 264 (−20)
      - Jonzon collects his second European Tour win, and first since 1997.

==== Motorcycle racing ====
- Moto GP:
  - Malaysian Grand Prix in Sepang: (1) Casey Stoner (AUS) (Ducati) 47:24.834 (2) Dani Pedrosa (ESP) (Honda) +14.666 (3) Valentino Rossi (ITA) (Yamaha) +19.385
    - Riders' standings (after 16 of 17 races): (1) Rossi 286 points (2) Jorge Lorenzo (ESP) (Yamaha) 245 (3) Stoner 220
      - Rossi secures his ninth championship title.
    - Manufacturers' standings: (1) Yamaha 366 (2) Honda 272 (3) Ducati 261
- Superbike:
  - Portimão Superbike World Championship round in Portimão, Portugal:
    - Race 1: (1) Ben Spies (USA) (Yamaha YZF-R1) 38:15.390 (2) Jonathan Rea (GBR) (Honda CBR1000RR) +1.697 (3) Max Biaggi (ITA) (Aprilia RSV 4) +2.113
    - Race 2: (1) Michel Fabrizio (ITA) (Ducati 1198) 38'19.654 (2) Noriyuki Haga (JPN) (Ducati 1198) 38'20.849 (3) Rea 38'21.148
      - Final riders' standings: (1) Spies 462 points (2) Haga 456 (3) Fabrizio 382
      - Final manufacturers' standings: (1) Ducati 572 (2) Yamaha 505 (3) Honda 431

==== Rugby league ====
- European Cup:
  - Group 2:
    - Serbia 8–88 Wales
      - Standings: Ireland, Wales 2 points (1 match), Serbia 0 (2).
- Pacific Cup:
  - Round robin match in Port Moresby:
    - Papua New Guinea 44–14 Tonga

==== Tennis ====
- ATP World Tour:
  - If Stockholm Open in Stockholm, Sweden:
    - Final: Marcos Baghdatis (CYP) def. Olivier Rochus (BEL) 6–1, 7–5
      - Baghdatis wins his first title of the year and third of his career.
  - Kremlin Cup in Moscow, Russia:
    - Final: Mikhail Youzhny (RUS) (3) def. Janko Tipsarević (SRB) (6) 6–7(5), 6–0, 6–4
      - Youzhny wins his first title of the year, and the fifth of his career.
- WTA Tour:
  - Kremlin Cup in Moscow, Russia:
    - Final: Francesca Schiavone (ITA) (8) def. Olga Govortsova (BLR) 6–3, 6–0
      - Schiavone wins her first title of the year, and the second of her career.
  - BGL Luxembourg Open in Luxembourg City, Luxembourg:
    - Final: Timea Bacsinszky (SUI) def. Sabine Lisicki (GER) (6) 6–2, 7–5
      - Bacsinszky wins the first title of her career.

=== October 24, 2009 (Saturday) ===
==== American football ====
- NCAA:
  - BCS Top 10 (unbeaten teams in **bold**):
    - (1) **Florida** 29, Mississippi State 19
    - "Third Saturday in October": (2) **Alabama** 12, Tennessee 10
      - Terrence Kody blocks Daniel Lincoln's 44-yard field-goal attempt as time expires to maintain the Crimson Tide's unbeaten record.
    - (3) **Texas** 41, Missouri 7
    - (4) **Boise State** 54, Hawaiʻi 9
    - The Keg of Nails: (5) **Cincinnati** 41, Louisville 10
    - (6) **Iowa** 15, Michigan State 13
      - Ricky Stanzi connects with Marvin McNutt on a 7-yard touchdown pass on the game's final play to keep the Hawkeyes unbeaten.
    - (7) USC 42, Oregon State 36
    - (8) **TCU** 38, (16) Brigham Young 7
    - (9) LSU 31, Auburn 10
    - Clemson 40, (10) Miami 37 (OT)
  - Other games:
    - Oklahoma 35, (25) Kansas 13

==== Alpine skiing ====
- World Cup:
  - Women's GS in Sölden, Austria: (gold) Tanja Poutiainen (FIN) 2:24.96 (silver) Kathrin Zettel (AUT) 2:24.97 (bronze) Denise Karbon (ITA) 2:25.28

==== Auto racing ====
- Nationwide Series:
  - Kroger On Track for the Cure 250 in Millington, Tennessee:
    - (1) Brad Keselowski (Michigan) (Chevrolet, JR Motorsports) (2) Kyle Busch (Nevada) (Toyota, Joe Gibbs Racing) (3) Jason Leffler (California) (Toyota, Braun Racing)
      - Standings (with 3 races remaining): (1) Busch 5004 points (2) Carl Edwards (Missouri) (Ford, Roush Fenway Racing) 4809 (3) Keselowski 4732
- V8 Supercars:
  - V8 Supercar Challenge in Surfers Paradise, Queensland:
    - Race 19: (1) Garth Tander (AUS) (Holden Commodore) (2) Mark Winterbottom (AUS) (Ford Falcon) (3) Will Davison (AUS) (Holden Commodore)
      - Drivers' standings (after 19 of 26 races): (1) Jamie Whincup (AUS) (Ford Falcon) 2553 points (2) Davison 2512 (3) Tander 2181

==== Baseball ====
- Major League Baseball postseason:
  - ALCS:
    - Game 6, Los Angeles Angels of Anaheim at New York Yankees, postponed (rain). **Yankees lead best-of-7 series 3–2.**
- Nippon Professional Baseball postseason:
  - Pacific League Climax Series, second stage:
    - Game 4, Hokkaido Nippon-Ham Fighters 9, Tohoku Rakuten Golden Eagles 4. **Fighters win best-of-7 series 4–1.**
  - Central League Climax Series, second stage:
    - Game 4, Yomiuri Giants 8, Chunichi Dragons 2. **Giants win best-of-7 series 4–1.**

==== Basketball ====
- Philippine NCAA in Quezon City:
  - Seniors' Finals: San Sebastian Stags 76, San Beda Red Lions 61, **San Sebastian win best-of-3 series 2–0**
    - San Sebastian clinch their twelfth NCAA championship, ending San Beda's 3-year championship run.

==== Figure skating ====
- ISU Grand Prix:
  - Rostelecom Cup in Moscow, Russia:
    - Men: (gold) Evgeni Plushenko (RUS) 240.65 (silver) Takahiko Kozuka (JPN) 215.13 (bronze) Artem Borodulin (RUS) 201.55
      - Plushenko wins his first competition since he won the gold medal at the 2006 Olympics.
    - Pairs: (gold) Pang Qing/Tong Jian (CHN) 191.33 (silver) Yuko Kavaguti/Alexander Smirnov (RUS) 180.14 (bronze) Keauna McLaughlin/Rockne Brubaker (USA) 160.55
    - Ice dance: (gold) Meryl Davis/Charlie White (USA) 201.10 (silver) Anna Cappelini/Luca Lanotte (ITA) 168.57 (bronze) Ekaterina Rubleva/Ivan Shefer (RUS) 163.32
    - Ladies: (gold) Miki Ando (JPN) 171.93 (silver) Ashley Wagner (USA) 163.97 (bronze) Alena Leonova (RUS) 160.06

==== Football (soccer) ====
- U-17 World Cup in Nigeria:
  - Group A:
    - Nigeria 3–3 Germany
    - Honduras 0–1 Argentina
  - Group B:
    - Brazil 3–2 Japan
    - Mexico 0–2 Switzerland
- 2011 FIFA Women's World Cup qualification (UEFA):
  - Group 1:
    - Croatia 0–1 Northern Ireland
    - France 2–0 Iceland
      - Standings: France 6 points (2 matches), Iceland 6 (3), Northern Ireland 3 (1).
  - Group 2: Norway 3–0 Netherlands
  - Group 3:
    - Denmark 15–0 Georgia
    - Greece 0–1 Scotland
      - Standings: Denmark 6 points (2 matches), Scotland 3 (1), Greece 3 (3).
  - Group 4: Poland 2–0 Romania
  - Group 5: Spain 2–0 Austria
  - Group 6: Israel 1–0 Kazakhstan
  - Group 7:
    - Armenia 0–8 Italy
    - Slovenia 0–3 Finland
      - Standings: Italy 9 points (3 matches), Finland 6 (2).
  - Group 8: Azerbaijan 0–3 Sweden

==== Rugby league ====
- European Cup:
  - Group 1:
    - Lebanon 86–0 Italy
      - Standings: Scotland, Lebanon 2 points (1 match), Italy 0 (2).
- Four Nations:
  - Round 1:
    - New Zealand 20–20 Australia
- Pacific Cup:
  - Round robin match in Port Moresby:
    - Fiji 22–24 Cook Islands

=== October 23, 2009 (Friday) ===
==== Baseball ====
- Nippon Professional Baseball postseason:
  - Pacific League Climax Series, second stage:
    - Game 3, Tohoku Rakuten Golden Eagles 3, Hokkaido Nippon-Ham Fighters 2. **Fighters lead best-of-7 series 3–1.**
  - Central League Climax Series, second stage:
    - Game 3, Yomiuri Giants 5, Chunichi Dragons 4. **Giants lead best-of-7 series 3–1.**

==== Basketball ====
- The NBA's officials approve a new collective bargaining agreement with the league, ending a month-long lockout days before the start of the regular season on Tuesday. (AP via ESPN)

==== Figure skating ====
- ISU Grand Prix:
  - Rostelecom Cup in Moscow, Russia:
    - Men's short program: (1) Evgeni Plushenko (RUS) 82.25 (2) Takahiko Kozuka (JPN) 75.50 (3) Johnny Weir (USA) 72.57
      - This is Plushenko's first ISU competition since he won the gold medal at the 2006 Olympics.
    - Pairs' short program: (1) Pang Qing/Tong Jian (CHN) 65.40 (2) Yuko Kavaguti/Alexander Smirnov (RUS) 61.62 (3) Keauna McLaughlin/Rockne Brubaker (USA) 61.34
    - Ladies' short program: (1) Júlia Sebestyén (HUN) 57.94 (2) Alissa Czisny (USA) 57.64 (3) Miki Ando (JPN) 57.18
    - Ice dance (after original dance): (1) Meryl Davis/Charlie White (USA) 100.08 (2) Anna Cappelini/Luca Lanotte (ITA) 85.31 (3) Ekaterina Rubleva/Ivan Shefer (RUS) 81.25

==== Rugby league ====
- Four Nations:
  - Round 1:
    - England 34–12 France

=== October 22, 2009 (Thursday) ===
==== Baseball ====
- Major League Baseball postseason:
  - ALCS:
    - Game 5: Los Angeles Angels of Anaheim 7, New York Yankees 6. **Yankees lead best-of-7 series 3–2.**
      - The Angels blow a 4–0 lead in the top of the seventh inning, giving up 6 runs, but come back with 3 in the bottom of the inning and stay alive in the series.
- Nippon Professional Baseball postseason:
  - Pacific League Climax Series, second stage:
    - Game 2: Hokkaido Nippon-Ham Fighters 3, Tohoku Rakuten Golden Eagles 1. **Fighters lead best-of-7 series 3–0**.
  - Central League Climax Series, second stage:
    - Game 2: Yomiuri Giants 6, Chunichi Dragons 4. **Giants lead best-of-7 series 2–1.**

==== Basketball ====
- Euroleague:
  - Regular Season Game 1:
    - Group B:
      - Lietuvos Rytas (Lithuania) 77–70 (Turkey) Efes Pilsen
      - Partizan (Serbia) 64–72 (Spain) Unicaja Málaga
    - Group C:
      - Lottomatica Roma (Italy) 77–65 (Spain) Caja Laboral Baskonia
    - Group D:
      - Khimki (Russia) 84–81 (Spain) Real Madrid (OT)
      - Armani Jeans Milano (Italy) 67–75 (Greece) Panathinaikos

==== Football (soccer) ====
- UEFA Europa League group stage, Matchday 3:
  - Group A:
    - Timişoara (Romania) 0–0 (Belgium) Anderlecht
    - Ajax (Netherlands) 2–1 (Croatia) Dinamo Zagreb
  - Group B:
    - Valencia (Spain) 1–1 (Czech Republic) Slavia Prague
    - Lille (France) 3–0 (Italy) Genoa
  - Group C:
    - Celtic (Scotland) 0–1 (Germany) Hamburg
    - Hapoel Tel Aviv (Israel) 5–1 (Austria) Rapid Wien
  - Group D:
    - Ventspils (Latvia) 1–2 (Portugal) Sporting CP
    - Hertha BSC (Germany) 0–1 (Netherlands) Heerenveen
  - Group E:
    - Fulham (England) 1–1 (Italy) Roma
    - CSKA Sofia (Bulgaria) 0–2 (Switzerland) Basel
  - Group F:
    - Galatasaray (Turkey) 4–1 (Romania) Dinamo București
    - Panathinaikos (Greece) 1–0 (Austria) Sturm Graz
  - Group G:
    - Red Bull Salzburg (Austria) 1–0 (Bulgaria) Levski Sofia
    - Lazio (Italy) 2–1 (Spain) Villarreal
  - Group H:
    - Sheriff Tiraspol (Moldova) 2–0 (Netherlands) Twente
    - Steaua București (Romania) 0–1 (Turkey) Fenerbahçe
  - Group I:
    - BATE Borisov (Belarus) 2–1 (Greece) AEK Athens
    - Benfica (Portugal) 5–0 (England) Everton
  - Group J:
    - Shakhtar Donetsk (Ukraine) 4–0 (France) Toulouse
    - Club Brugge (Belgium) 2–0 (Serbia) Partizan
  - Group K:
    - PSV Eindhoven (Netherlands) 1–0 (Denmark) Copenhagen
    - Sparta Prague (Czech Republic) 2–0 (Romania) CFR Cluj
  - Group L:
    - Austria Wien 2–2 (Germany) Werder Bremen
    - Athletic Bilbao (Spain) 2–1 (Portugal) Nacional
- Copa Sudamericana Quarterfinals, first leg:
  - Fluminense (Brazil) 2–2 Universidad de Chile
- CONCACAF Champions League Group Stage, round 6: (teams in **bold** advance to the quarterfinals)
  - Group B:
    - San Juan Jabloteh (Trinidad and Tobago) 2–4 (Honduras) **Marathón**
      - Final standings: **Toluca** 13 points, Marathón 12, D.C. United 10, San Juan Jabloteh 0.
  - Group D:
    - **Comunicaciones** (Guatemala) 2–1 (Mexico) **UNAM**
      - Final standings: UNAM 13 points, Comunicaciones 9, W Connection 7, Real España 6.

==== Snooker ====
- Premier League Snooker – League phase in Grimsby, Lincolnshire:
  - Ronnie O'Sullivan (ENG) 3–3 Stephen Hendry (SCO)
  - Shaun Murphy (ENG) 5–1 Marco Fu (HKG)
    - Standings: Ronnie O'Sullivan 6 points; John Higgins, Stephen Hendry, Judd Trump 4; Neil Robertson 3; Shaun Murphy 2; Marco Fu 1.

=== October 21, 2009 (Wednesday) ===
==== Baseball ====
- Major League Baseball postseason:
  - NLCS:
    - Game 5: Philadelphia Phillies 10, Los Angeles Dodgers 4. **Phillies win best-of-7 series 4–1.**
      - Jayson Werth's 3-run homer in the 1st inning sets the Phillies on their way to claim the National League title for the second straight year.
- Nippon Professional Baseball postseason:
  - Pacific League Climax Series, second stage:
    - Game 1, Hokkaido Nippon-Ham Fighters 9, Tohoku Rakuten Golden Eagles 8. **Fighters lead best-of-7 series 2–0**.
      - The Fighters rally from 8–4 down in the bottom of the 9th inning.
  - Central League Climax Series, second stage:
    - Game 1, Chunichi Dragons 7, Yomiuri Giants 2. **Best-of-7 series tied 1–1.**

==== Basketball ====
- Euroleague:
  - Regular Season Game 1:
    - Group A:
      - Cibona (Croatia) 40–85 (Italy) Montepaschi Siena
        - Cibona set a record for fewest points by a home team in the Euroleague.
      - Žalgiris (Lithuania) 71–52 (France) ASVEL Villeurbanne
      - Fenerbahçe Ülker (Turkey) 59–82 (Spain) Regal FC Barcelona
    - Group B:
      - Olympiacos (Greece) 94–72 (France) Orléans
    - Group C:
      - Maroussi (Greece) 65–66 (Russia) CSKA Moscow
    - Group D:
      - Asseco Prokom Gdynia (Poland) 81–87 (Germany) EWE Baskets Oldenburg

==== Football (soccer) ====
- UEFA Champions League group stage, Matchday 3:
  - Group A:
    - Bordeaux (France) 2–1 (Germany) Bayern Munich
    - Juventus (Italy) 1–0 (Israel) Maccabi Haifa
      - Standings: Bordeaux 7 points, Juventus 5, Bayern Munich 4, Maccabi Haifa 0.
  - Group B:
    - CSKA Moscow (Russia) 0–1 (England) Manchester United
    - Wolfsburg (Germany) 0–0 (Turkey) Beşiktaş
      - Standings: Manchester United 9 points, Wolfsburg 4, CSKA Moscow 3, Beşiktaş 1.
  - Group C:
    - Real Madrid (Spain) 2–3 (Italy) Milan
    - Zürich (Switzerland) 0–1 (France) Marseille
      - Standings: Milan, Real Madrid 6 points, Marseille, Zürich 3.
  - Group D:
    - Porto (Portugal) 2–1 (Cyprus) APOEL
    - Chelsea (England) 4–0 (Spain) Atlético Madrid
      - Standings: Chelsea 9 points, Porto 6, APOEL, Atlético Madrid 1.
- Copa Sudamericana Quarterfinals, first leg:
  - Cerro Porteño (Paraguay) 2–1 (Brazil) Botafogo
  - River Plate (Uruguay) 0–1 (Argentina) San Lorenzo
- AFC Champions League Semi-finals, first leg:
  - Al-Ittihad (Saudi Arabia) 6–2 (Japan) Nagoya Grampus
  - Pohang Steelers (South Korea) 2–0 (Qatar) Umm-Salal
- AFC Cup Semi-finals, second leg: (first leg score in parentheses)
  - South China (Hong Kong) 0–1 (1–2) **Al-Kuwait**. Al-Kuwait win 3–1 on aggregate.
  - **Al-Karamah** (Syria) 3–0 (1–2) (Vietnam) Bình Dương. Al-Karamah win 4–2 on aggregate.
- CONCACAF Champions League Group Stage, round 6: (teams in **bold** advance to the quarterfinals)
  - Group A:
    - **Pachuca** (Mexico) 2–0 (Panama) **Árabe Unido**
    - Isidro Metapán (El Salvador) 3–2 (United States) Houston Dynamo
      - Final standings: Pachuca 15 points, Árabe Unido 10, Houston Dynamo 7, Isidro Metapán 3.
  - Group D:
    - W Connection (Trinidad and Tobago) 3–2 (Honduras) Real España
      - Standings: **UNAM** 13 points (5 matches), W Connection 7 (6), Communicaciones 6 (5), Real España 6 (6).
- 2011 FIFA Women's World Cup qualification (UEFA):
  - Group 3: Bulgaria 0–1 Greece

=== October 20, 2009 (Tuesday) ===
==== Baseball ====
- Major League Baseball postseason:
  - ALCS:
    - Game 4: New York Yankees 10, Los Angeles Angels of Anaheim 1. **Yankees lead best-of-7 series 3–1.**

==== Basketball ====
- The WNBA announces that the Detroit Shock, which won three WNBA titles, most recently in 2008, has been purchased by a group of investors in Tulsa, Oklahoma, and will be moved to that city for the 2010 season. The new team name has not yet been announced, but former University of Tulsa and Arkansas head coach Nolan Richardson has been named head coach and general manager. (AP via ESPN)

==== Football (soccer) ====
- UEFA Champions League group stage, Matchday 3:
  - Group E:
    - Debrecen (Hungary) 3–4 (Italy) Fiorentina
    - Liverpool (England) 1–2 (France) Lyon
      - Standings: Lyon 9 points, Fiorentina 6, Liverpool 3, Debrecen 0.
  - Group F:
    - Barcelona (Spain) 1–2 (Russia) Rubin Kazan
    - Internazionale (Italy) 2–2 (Ukraine) Dynamo Kyiv
      - Standings: Barcelona, Dynamo Kyiv, Rubin Kazan 4 points, Inter 3.
  - Group G:
    - Rangers (Scotland) 1–4 (Romania) Unirea Urziceni
    - Stuttgart (Germany) 1–3 (Spain) Sevilla
      - Standings: Sevilla 9 points, Unirea Urziceni 4, Stuttgart 2, Rangers 1.
  - Group H:
    - AZ (Netherlands) 1–1 (England) Arsenal
    - Olympiacos (Greece) 2–1 (Belgium) Standard Liège
      - Standings: Arsenal 7 points, Olympiacos 6, AZ 2, Standard Liège 1.
- Copa Sudamericana Quarterfinals, first leg:
  - Vélez Sarsfield (Argentina) 1–1 (Ecuador) LDU Quito
- CONCACAF Champions League Group Stage, round 6: (teams in **bold** advance to the quarterfinals)
  - Group B:
    - **Toluca** (Mexico) 1–1 (United States) D.C. United
      - Standings: Toluca 13 points (6 matches), D.C. United 10 (6), Marathón 9 (5), San Juan Jabloteh 0 (5).
  - Group C:
    - Puerto Rico Islanders 1–1 (United States) **Columbus Crew**
    - Saprissa (Costa Rica) 1–2 (Mexico) **Cruz Azul**
      - Final standings: Cruz Azul 16 points, Columbus Crew 8, Saprissa 5, Puerto Rico Islanders 3.

=== October 19, 2009 (Monday) ===
==== American football ====
- NFL Monday Night Football Week 6 (unbeaten team in **bold**):
  - **Denver Broncos** 34, San Diego Chargers 23
    - Eddie Royal becomes the first Bronco and 11th NFL player overall to return a kickoff and a punt for touchdowns in the same game.

==== Baseball ====
- Major League Baseball postseason:
  - ALCS:
    - Game 3, Los Angeles Angels of Anaheim 5, New York Yankees 4, 11 innings. **Yankees lead best-of-7 series 2–1.**
  - NLCS:
    - Game 4: Philadelphia Phillies 5, Los Angeles Dodgers 4. **Phillies lead best-of-7 series 3–1.**
      - Jimmy Rollins' walk-off two-run double puts the Phils one win away from the World Series.
- Nippon Professional Baseball postseason:
  - Central League Climax Series, first stage:
    - Game 3, Chunichi Dragons 7, Tokyo Yakult Swallows 4. **Dragons win best-of-3 series 2–1.**

=== October 18, 2009 (Sunday) ===
==== American football ====
- NFL Week 6 (unbeaten teams in **bold**):
  - Carolina Panthers 28, Tampa Bay Buccaneers 21
    - The Bucs remain winless on the season.
  - Houston Texans 28, Cincinnati Bengals 17
  - Green Bay Packers 26, Detroit Lions 0
  - Kansas City Chiefs 14, Washington Redskins 6
    - The Chiefs pick up their first win of the season.
  - Pittsburgh Steelers 27, Cleveland Browns 14
    - Ben Roethlisberger becomes the second quarterback this season to throw for 400 yards.
  - Jacksonville Jaguars 23, St. Louis Rams 20 (OT)
    - Josh Scobee's field goal keeps the Rams winless.
  - **Minnesota Vikings** 33, Baltimore Ravens 31
  - **New Orleans Saints** 48, New York Giants 27
    - The Saints win the battle of unbeatens, with Drew Brees throwing for four touchdowns.
  - Arizona Cardinals 27, Seattle Seahawks 3
    - Cardinals QB Kurt Warner ties Dan Marino's record as the fastest to 30,000 career passing yards, reaching the milestone in his 114th NFL game.
  - Oakland Raiders 13, Philadelphia Eagles 9
  - New England Patriots 59, Tennessee Titans 0
    - The Patriots tie for the largest margin of victory in any game since the AFL–NFL merger in 1970, and set franchise records for points and total yards (619). Quarterback Tom Brady throws six TD passes, five of them in the second quarter to set a new NFL record for TD passes in a quarter. The winless Titans suffer their largest defeat in franchise history.
  - Buffalo Bills 16, New York Jets 13 (OT)
  - Sunday Night Football Atlanta Falcons 21, Chicago Bears 14
  - Bye week: Dallas Cowboys, **Indianapolis Colts**, Miami Dolphins, San Francisco 49ers
- NCAA College Football:
  - UConn cornerback Jasper Howard is murdered, age 20, in a stabbing at the University of Connecticut Student Union, just hours after UConn's game against Louisville.

==== Auto racing ====
- Formula One:
  - Brazilian Grand Prix in São Paulo:
    - (1) Mark Webber (AUS) (Red Bull–Renault) 1:32:23.081 (2) Robert Kubica (POL) (BMW Sauber) +7.626 (3) Lewis Hamilton (GBR) (McLaren–Mercedes) +18.944
      - Drivers' Championship standings (after 16 of 17 races): (1) Jenson Button (GBR) (Brawn–Mercedes) 89 points (2) Sebastian Vettel (GER) (Red Bull-Renault) 74 (3) Rubens Barrichello (BRA) (Brawn-Mercedes) 72
        - Button secures the title with one race remaining.
      - Constructors' Championship standings: (1) Brawn-Mercedes 161 points (2) Red Bull-Renault 135.5 (3) McLaren-Mercedes 71

==== Baseball ====
- Major League Baseball postseason:
  - NLCS:
    - Game 3, Philadelphia Phillies 11, Los Angeles Dodgers 0. **Phillies lead best-of-7 series 2–1.**
- Nippon Professional Baseball postseason:
  - Central League Climax Series, first stage:
    - Game 2, Chunichi Dragons 3, Tokyo Yakult Swallows 2. **Best-of-3 series tied 1–1.**

==== Basketball ====
- Africa Championship for Women in Antananarivo, Madagascar:
  - Seventh place match: **Cameroon** 66–61 Madagascar
  - Fifth place match: **Nigeria** 67–57 Mozambique
  - Bronze medal match: Ivory Coast 57–76 (bronze) **Angola**
  - Final: (gold) **Senegal** 72–57 (silver) Mali
    - Senegal win the title for the tenth time.

==== Cricket ====
- Kenya in Zimbabwe:
  - 5th ODI in Harare:
    - Zimbabwe 329/3 (50 ov, Hamilton Masakadza 178*); Kenya 187 (39.3 ov). **Zimbabwe win by 142 runs and win the 5-match series 4–1.**

==== Football (soccer) ====
- CAF Champions League semifinals, second leg: (first leg score in parentheses)
  - **TP Mazembe** (Democratic Republic of the Congo) 0–2 (5–2) (Sudan) Al-Hilal. TP Mazembe win 5–4 on aggregate.
- CAF Confederation Cup Semifinals, second leg: (first leg score in parentheses)
  - **Stade Malien** (Mali) 4–2 (2–2) (Egypt) ENPPI. Stade Malien win 6–4 on aggregate.
- Women's Copa Libertadores in Santos and Guarujá, Brazil:
  - Bronze medal match: (bronze) **Formas Íntimas** (Colombia) 2–0 (Chile) Everton
  - Final: (gold) **Santos (Brazil)** 9–0 (silver) (Paraguay) Universidad Autónoma

==== Golf ====
- PGA Tour:
  - Fall Series:
    - Justin Timberlake Shriners Hospitals for Children Open in Las Vegas:
      - Winner: Martin Laird (SCO) 265 (−19) PO
        - Laird wins his first PGA Tour title in a three-way playoff, eliminating Chad Campbell (USA) on the second playoff hole and George McNeill (USA) on the third.
- European Tour:
  - Portugal Masters in Vilamoura, Portugal:
    - Winner: Lee Westwood (ENG) 265 (−23)
      - Westwood collects his first professional win in over two years, a period in which he had 26 top-10 finishes. He also takes the lead in the Race to Dubai and will rise to the top 5 in the Official World Golf Rankings.

==== Gymnastics ====
- World Artistic Gymnastics Championships in London, Great Britain:
  - Men's Vault: (gold) Marian Drăgulescu (ROU) 16.575 (silver) Flavius Koczi (ROU) 16.337 (bronze) Anton Golotsutskov (RUS) 16.287
  - Women's Balance Beam: (gold) Deng Linlin (CHN) 15.000 (silver) Lauren Mitchell (AUS) 14.875 (bronze) Ivana Hong (USA) 14.550
  - Men's Parallel Bars: (gold) Wang Guanyin (CHN) 15.950 (silver) Feng Zhe (CHN) 15.775 (bronze) Kazuhito Tanaka (JPN) 15.500
  - Women's Floor Exercise: (gold) Elizabeth Tweddle (GBR) 14.650 (silver) Lauren Mitchell (AUS) 14.550 (bronze) Sui Lu (CHN) 14.300
  - Men's Horizontal Bar: (gold) Zou Kai (CHN) 16.150 (silver) Epke Zonderland (NED) 15.825 (bronze) Igor Cassina (ITA) 15.625

==== Motorcycle racing ====
- Moto GP:
  - Australian Grand Prix in Phillip Island: (1) Casey Stoner (AUS) (Ducati) 40:56.651 (2) Valentino Rossi (ITA) (Yamaha) +1.935 (3) Dani Pedrosa (ESP) (Honda) +22.618
    - Riders' standings (after 15 of 17 races): (1) Rossi 270 points (2) Jorge Lorenzo (ESP) (Yamaha) 232 (3) Stoner 195
    - Manufacturers' standings: (1) Yamaha 350 (2) Honda 252 (3) Ducati 236

==== Rugby league ====
- European Cup:
  - Group 2:
    - Ireland 82–0 Serbia

==== Rugby union ====
- Heineken Cup pool stage, matchday 2:
  - Pool 3: Ospreys (Wales) 25–24 (France) Clermont Auvergne
    - Standings: Leicester Tigers 8 points, Clermont, Ospreys 6, Viadana 0.
  - Pool 4: Bath (England) 27–29 (France) Stade Français
    - Standings: Stade Français 9 points, Ulster 5, Edinburgh 4, Bath 1.
- Amlin Challenge Cup pool stage, matchday 2:
  - Pool 1: Leeds (England) 37–13 (Italy) Overmach Parma
    - Standings: Bourgoin 8 points, Leeds, București Oaks 5, Parma 0.
  - Pool 5: Falcons (England) 45–3 (France) Albi
    - Standings: Falcons 10 points, Montauban 8, Padova 1, Albi 0.

==== Snooker ====
- World Series of Snooker, Tournament in Prague, Czech Republic
  - Semi-finals:
    - Graeme Dott (SCO) def. Stephen Maguire (SCO) 5–1
    - Jimmy White (ENG) def. John Higgins (SCO) 5–1
  - Final
    - Jimmy White (ENG) def. Graeme Dott (SCO) 5–3

==== Taekwondo ====
- World Championships in Copenhagen, Denmark:
  - Men's 74 kg: (gold) Kim Joon-Tae (KOR) (silver) Maxime Potvin (CAN) (bronze) Mark López (USA) & Mokdad Ounis (GER)
  - Women's 62 kg: (gold) Lim Su-Jeong (KOR) (silver) Zhang Hua (CHN) (bronze) Estefanía Hernández (ESP) & Chonnapas Premwaew (THA)
  - Women's +73 kg: (gold) Rosana Simón (ESP) (silver) Liu Rui (CHN) (bronze) Jo Seol (KOR) & Natália Falavigna (BRA)

==== Tennis ====
- ATP World Tour:
  - Shanghai Masters in Shanghai, China:
    - Final: (6) **Nikolay Davydenko** (RUS) def. (1) Rafael Nadal (ESP) 7–6 (3), 6–3
      - Davydenko wins his fourth title of the year and the 18th of his career. He also wins his third Masters title and improves his perfect record in Masters finals to 3–0.
- WTA Tour:
  - Generali Ladies Linz in Linz, Austria:
    - Final: (3) **Yanina Wickmayer** (BEL) def. Petra Kvitová (CZE) 6–3, 6–4
      - Wickmayer wins her second title of the year and career.
  - HP Open in Osaka, Japan:
    - Final: (3) **Samantha Stosur** (AUS) def. (4) Francesca Schiavone (ITA) 7–5, 6–1
      - Stosur wins her first WTA Tour title after losing five previous finals.

=== October 17, 2009 (Saturday) ===
==== Auto racing ====
- Chase for the Sprint Cup:
  - NASCAR Banking 500 Only from Bank of America in Concord, North Carolina
    - (1) Jimmie Johnson (California) (Chevrolet, Hendrick Motorsports) (2) Matt Kenseth (Wisconsin) (Ford, Roush Fenway Racing) (3) Kasey Kahne (Washington (state)) (Dodge, Richard Petty Motorsports)
      - Drivers' standings (with 5 races remaining): (1) Johnson 5923 points (2) Mark Martin (Arkansas) (Chevrolet, Hendrick Motorsports) 5833 (3) Jeff Gordon (California) (Chevrolet, Hendrick Motorsports) 5788

==== American football ====
- NCAA:
  - AP Top 10 (unbeaten teams in **bold**):
    - (1) **Florida** 23, Arkansas 20
    - (2) **Alabama** 20, (22) South Carolina 6
    - Red River Rivalry in Dallas: (3) **Texas** 16, (20) Oklahoma 13
      - For the second time this season, Sooners quarterback Sam Bradford suffers an injury to his right (throwing) shoulder.
    - (19) Georgia Tech 28, (4) Virginia Tech 23
    - Jeweled Shillelagh: (6) USC 34, (25) Notre Dame 27
      - The Trojans win the game for the eighth straight time.
    - Purdue 26, (7) Ohio State 18
    - (9) Miami 27, UCF 7
    - Played earlier this week: (5) **Boise State**, (8) **Cincinnati**
    - Idle this week: (10) LSU
  - Other games:
    - Texas Tech 31, (15) Nebraska 10
    - Colorado 34, (17) Kansas 30
  - Other remaining unbeaten teams (rankings in parentheses):
    - (11) Iowa, (12) TCU

==== Baseball ====
- Major League Baseball postseason:
  - ALCS:
    - Game 2: New York Yankees 4, Los Angeles Angels of Anaheim 3 (13 innings). **Yankees lead best-of-7 series 2–0.**
- Nippon Professional Baseball postseason:
  - Pacific League Climax Series, first stage:
    - Game 2: Tohoku Rakuten Golden Eagles 4, Fukuoka SoftBank Hawks 1. **Golden Eagles win best-of-3 series 2–0.**
  - Central League Climax Series, first stage:
    - Game 1: Tokyo Yakult Swallows 3, Chunichi Dragons 2. **Swallows lead best-of-3 series 1–0.**

==== Basketball ====
- Africa Championship for Women in Antananarivo, Madagascar:
  - Classification 5–8:
    - **Nigeria** 62–51 Cameroon
    - Madagascar 66–73 **Mozambique**
  - Semifinals: (winners qualify for 2010 World Championship)
    - **Senegal** 75–54 Ivory Coast
    - **Mali** 70–60 (OT) Angola

==== Cricket ====
- Kenya in Zimbabwe:
  - 4th ODI in Harare:
    - Kenya 270/8 (50 ov); Zimbabwe 271/4 (48.0 ov). **Zimbabwe win by 6 wickets, and lead the 5-match series 3–1**.

==== Figure skating ====
- ISU Grand Prix:
  - Trophée Eric Bompard in Paris, France:
    - Men: (gold) Nobunari Oda (JPN) 242.53 (silver) Tomáš Verner (CZE) 229.96 (bronze) Adam Rippon (USA) 219.96
    - Pairs: (gold) Maria Mukhortova/Maxim Trankov (RUS) 192.93 (silver) Jessica Dubé/Bryce Davison (CAN) 180.97 (bronze) Aliona Savchenko/Robin Szolkowy (GER) 174.42
    - Ladies: (gold) Kim Yuna (KOR) 210.03 (silver) Mao Asada (JPN) 173.99 (bronze) Yukari Nakano (JPN) 165.70
    - Ice dance: (gold) Tessa Virtue/Scott Moir (CAN) 197.71 (silver) Nathalie Péchalat/Fabian Bourzat (FRA) 181.64 (bronze) Sinead Kerr/John Kerr (GBR) 177.11

==== Gymnastics ====
- World Artistic Gymnastics Championships in London, Great Britain:
  - Men's Floor Exercise: (gold) Marian Drăgulescu (ROM) 15.700 (silver) Zou Kai (CHN) 15.675 (bronze) Alexander Shatilov (ISR) 15.575
  - Women's Vault: (gold) Kayla Williams (USA) 15.087 (silver) Ariella Kaeslin (SUI) 14.525 (bronze) Youna Dufournet (FRA) 14.450
  - Men's Pommel Horse: (gold) Zhang Hongtao (CHN) 16.200 (silver) Krisztián Berki (HUN) 16.075 (bronze) Prashanth Sellathurai (AUS) 15.400
  - Women's Uneven Bars: (gold) He Kexin (CHN) 16.000 (silver) Koko Tsurumi (JPN) 14.875 (bronze) Ana Porgras (ROM) & Rebecca Bross (USA) 14.675
  - Men's Rings: (gold) Yang Mingyong (CHN) 15.675 (silver) Yordan Yovchev (BUL) 15.575 (bronze) Oleksandr Vorobiov (UKR) 15.550

==== Rugby league ====
- European Cup:
  - Group 1:
    - Italy 0–104 Scotland
- Pacific Cup:
  - Qualifying in Cairns:
    - Samoa 20–22 Cook Islands

==== Rugby union ====
- Heineken Cup pool stage, matchday 2:
  - Pool 1: Munster (Ireland) 41–10 (Italy) Benetton Treviso
    - Standings: Munster 6 points, Perpignan 5, Northampton, Treviso 4.
  - Pool 2: Biarritz (France) 42–15 (England) Gloucester
    - Standings: Biarritz 9 points, Dragons 5, Gloucester 4, Glasgow Warriors 1.
  - Pool 3: Viadana (Italy) 11–46 (England) Leicester Tigers
  - Pool 4: Edinburgh (Scotland) 17–13 (Ireland) Ulster
  - Pool 5: Harlequins (England) 19–23 (France) Toulouse
    - Standings: Toulouse 9 points, Cardiff Blues 5, Sale 4, Harlequins 1.
  - Pool 6:
    - London Irish (England) 25–27 (Wales) Scarlets
    - Brive (France) 13–36 (Ireland) Leinster
      - Standings: Scarlets 8 points, Leinster, London Irish 5, Brive 0.
- Amlin Challenge Cup pool stage, matchday 2:
  - Pool 1: București Oaks (Romania) 19–21 (France) Bourgoin
  - Pool 2: Olympus Madrid (Spain) 5–38 (England) Worcester
    - Standings: Connacht 9 points, Worcester 6, Montpellier 5, Olympus Madrid 0.
  - Pool 3: Rovigo (Italy) 11–76 (France) Castres
    - Standings: Toulon 8 points, Castres, Saracens 5, Rovigo 0.
  - Pool 4:
    - Rugby Roma (Italy) 0–57 (England) Wasps
    - Racing Métro (France) 16–20 (France) Bayonne
      - Standings: Bayonne, Wasps 9 points, Racing Métro 2, Roma 0.
- Currie Cup semifinals:
  - Sharks 21–23 Free State Cheetahs
  - Western Province 19–21 Blue Bulls

==== Snooker ====
- World Series of Snooker, Tournament in Prague, Czech Republic
  - Quarter-finals:
    - Stephen Maguire (SCO) def. Kryštof Michal (CZE) 5–0
    - Graeme Dott (SCO) def. Osip Zusmanovic (CZE) 5–0
    - John Higgins (SCO) def. Lukáš Křenek (CZE) 5–1
    - Jimmy White (ENG) def. Sishuo Wang (CZE) 5–0

==== Taekwondo ====
- World Championships in Copenhagen, Denmark:
  - Men's 54 kg: (gold) Choi Yeon-Ho (KOR) (silver) Mahmood Haidari (AFG) (bronze) Chutchawal Khawlaor (THA) & Meisam Bagheri (IRI)
  - Men's 87 kg: (gold) Bahri Tanrıkulu (TUR) (silver) Carlo Molfetta (ITA) (bronze) Vanja Babić (SRB) & Yousef Karami (IRI)
  - Women's 46 kg: (gold) Park Hyo-Ji (KOR) (silver) Zoraida Santiago (PUR) (bronze) Buttree Puedpong (THA) & Yvette Yong (CAN)
  - Women's 73 kg: (gold) Hang Yingying (CHN) (silver) Lee In-Jong (KOR) (bronze) Furkan Asena Aydın (TUR) & Anastasia Baryshnikova (RUS)

==== Volleyball ====
- NORCECA Men's Championship in Bayamón, Puerto Rico:
  - Seventh place match: **Barbados** 3–1 Panama
  - Fifth place match: **Mexico** 3–2 Dominican Republic
  - Bronze medal match: Canada 2–3 (bronze) **Puerto Rico**
  - Final: (gold) **Cuba** 3–1 (silver) United States
    - Cuba win the title for the 14th time, and qualify for the World Grand Champions Cup.

=== October 16, 2009 (Friday) ===
==== Auto racing ====
- Nationwide Series:
  - Dollar General 300 in Concord, North Carolina
    - (1) Kyle Busch (Nevada) (Toyota, Joe Gibbs Racing) (2) Mike Bliss (Oregon) (Toyota, CJM Racing) (3) Dave Blaney (Ohio) (Toyota, NEMCO Motorsports)

==== Baseball ====
- Major League Baseball postseason:
  - ALCS:
    - Game 1, New York Yankees 4, Los Angeles Angels of Anaheim 1. **Yankees lead best-of-7 series 1–0**.
  - NLCS:
    - Game 2, Los Angeles Dodgers 2, Philadelphia Phillies 1. **Best-of-7 series tied 1–1.**
- Nippon Professional Baseball postseason:
  - Pacific League Climax Series, first stage:
    - Game 1, Tohoku Rakuten Golden Eagles 11, Fukuoka SoftBank Hawks 4. **Golden Eagles lead best-of-3 series 1–0.**

==== Basketball ====
- Africa Championship for Women in Antananarivo, Madagascar:
  - Quarterfinals:
    - **Senegal** 89–45 Nigeria
    - **Ivory Coast** 55–44 Cameroon
    - **Mali** 80–46 Madagascar
    - Mozambique 36–68 **Angola**

==== Figure skating ====
- ISU Grand Prix:
  - Trophée Eric Bompard in Paris, France:
    - Men's short program: (1) Tomáš Verner (CZE) 81.00 (2) Nobunari Oda (JPN) 79.20 (3) Adam Rippon (USA) 75.82
    - Pairs' short program: (1) Aliona Savchenko/Robin Szolkowy (GER) 72.98 (2) Maria Mukhortova/Maxim Trankov (RUS) 66.88 (3) Jessica Dubé/Bryce Davison (CAN) 64.54
    - Ladies' short program: (1) Kim Yuna (KOR) 76.08 (2) Yukari Nakano (JPN) 59.64 (3) Mao Asada (JPN) 58.96
    - Ice dance after original dance: (1) Tessa Virtue/Scott Moir (CAN) 100.32 (2) Nathalie Péchalat/Fabian Bourzat (FRA) 91.87 (3) Sinead Kerr/John Kerr (GBR) 90.86

==== Football (soccer) ====
- U-20 World Cup in Egypt:
  - Bronze medal match: (bronze) **Hungary** 1–1 (2–0 pen.) Costa Rica
  - Final: (silver) Brazil 0–0 (3–4 pen.) (gold) **Ghana**
    - Ghana win the title for the first time.
- CAF Confederation Cup Semifinals, second leg: (first leg score in parentheses)
  - **ES Sétif** (Algeria) 1–0 (1–1) (Nigeria) Bayelsa United. ES Sétif win 2–1 on aggregate.
- Women's Copa Libertadores in São Paulo, Brazil:
  - Semifinals:
    - **Santos** (Brazil) 5–0 (Colombia) Formas Íntimas
    - **Universidad Autónoma** (Paraguay) 1–0 (Chile) Everton

==== Gymnastics ====
- World Artistic Gymnastics Championships in London, Great Britain:
  - Women's All-around Final: (gold) Bridget Sloan (USA) 57.825 points (silver) Rebecca Bross (USA) 57.775 (bronze) Koko Tsurumi (JPN) 57.175

==== Rugby union ====
- Heineken Cup pool stage, matchday 2:
  - Pool 1: Perpignan (France) 29–13 (England) Northampton Saints
  - Pool 2: Newport Gwent Dragons (Wales) 22–14 (Scotland) Glasgow Warriors
  - Pool 5: Sale Sharks (England) 27–26 (Wales) Cardiff Blues
- Amlin Challenge Cup pool stage, matchday 2:
  - Pool 2: Montpellier (France) 19–22 (Ireland) Connacht
  - Pool 5: Montauban (France) 27–10 (Italy) Petrarca Padova

==== Taekwondo ====
- World Championships in Copenhagen, Denmark:
  - Men's 63 kg: (gold) Yeom Hyo-Seob (KOR) (silver) Reza Naderian (IRI) (bronze) Javier Marrón (ESP) & Cem Uluğnuyan (TUR)
  - Men's 68 kg: (gold) Mohammad Bagheri (IRI) (silver) Idulio Islas (MEX) (bronze) Servet Tazegül (TUR) & Balla Dièye (SEN)
  - Women's 53 kg: (gold) Danielle Pelham (USA) (silver) Sarita Phongsri (THA) (bronze) Kwon Eun-Kyung (KOR) & Euda Carías (GUA)

==== Volleyball ====
- NORCECA Men's Championship in Bayamón, Puerto Rico:
  - Classification 5–8:
    - Barbados 1–3 Mexico
    - Panama 0–3 Dominican Republic
  - Semifinals:
    - Cuba 3–0 Canada
    - United States 3–0 Puerto Rico

=== October 15, 2009 (Thursday) ===
==== American football ====
- NCAA:
  - AP Top 10 (unbeaten team in **bold**):
    - (8) **Cincinnati** 34, (21) South Florida 17

==== Baseball ====
- Major League Baseball postseason:
  - NLCS:
    - Game 1: Philadelphia Phillies 8, Los Angeles Dodgers 6. **Phillies lead series 1–0.**

==== Basketball ====
- Euroleague:
  - Regular Season Game 1:
    - Group C:
      - Maccabi Tel Aviv (Israel) 85–65 (Slovenia) Union Olimpija Ljubljana

==== Cricket ====
- Kenya in Zimbabwe:
  - 3rd ODI in Harare:
    - Kenya 266/9 (50 ov); Zimbabwe 246 (49.5 ov). **Kenya win by 20 runs. Zimbabwe lead the 5-match series 2–1**

==== Gymnastics ====
- World Artistic Gymnastics Championships in London, Great Britain:
  - Men's All-around Final: (gold) Kōhei Uchimura (JPN) 91.500 points (silver) Daniel Keatings 88.925 (GBR) (bronze) Yury Ryazanov (RUS) 88.400

==== Rugby union ====
- Amlin Challenge Cup pool stage, matchday 2:
  - Pool 3: Toulon (France) 31–23 (England) Saracens

==== Snooker ====
- Premier League Snooker – League phase in Aberdeen:
  - Ronnie O'Sullivan (ENG) 4–2 Shaun Murphy (ENG)
  - John Higgins (SCO) 3–3 Stephen Hendry (SCO)
    - Standings: Ronnie O'Sullivan 5 points; John Higgins, Judd Trump 4; Stephen Hendry, Neil Robertson 3; Marco Fu 1; Shaun Murphy 0.

==== Taekwondo ====
- World Championships in Copenhagen, Denmark:
  - Men's 58 kg: (gold) Joel Gonzalez (ESP) (silver) Damián Villa (MEX) (bronze) Hasan Rezaï (AFG) & Mauro Crismanich (ARG)
  - Women's 49 kg: (gold) Brigitte Yagüe (ESP) (silver) Anna Soboleva (RUS) (bronze) Wu Jingyu (CHN) & Yasmina Aziez (FRA)
  - Women's 57 kg: (gold) Hou Yu (CHN) (silver) Veronica Calabrese (ITA) (bronze) Andrea Rica (ESP) & Tseng Pei-Hua (TPE)

==== Volleyball ====
- NORCECA Men's Championship in Bayamón, Puerto Rico:
  - Quarterfinals:
    - Canada 3–2 Dominican Republic
    - Puerto Rico 3–0 Mexico

=== October 14, 2009 (Wednesday) ===
==== American football ====
- NCAA:
  - AP Top 10 (unbeaten team in **bold**):
    - (5) **Boise State** 28, Tulsa 21

==== Basketball ====
- Africa Championship for Women in Antananarivo, Madagascar: (teams in **bold** advance to the quarterfinals)
  - Group A:
    - **Madagascar** 59–71 **Mozambique**
    - **Senegal** 107–19 Mauritius
    - South Africa 50–64 **Cameroon**
      - Final standings: Senegal 10 points, Mozambique 9, Cameroon 8, Madagascar 7, South Africa 6, Mauritius 5.
  - Group B:
    - **Mali** 66–38 Tunisia
    - **Angola** 60–45 **Nigeria**
    - Rwanda 60–64 **Ivory Coast**
      - Final standings: Mali, Côte d'Ivoire, Angola 9 points, Nigeria 7, Tunisia 6, Rwanda 5.

==== Football (soccer) ====
- 2010 FIFA World Cup qualification: (teams in **bold** qualify for 2010 FIFA World Cup, teams in italics advance to the play-offs)
  - UEFA:
    - Group 1:
      - Sweden 4–1 Albania
      - Portugal 4–0 Malta
      - **Denmark** 0–1 Hungary
        - Final standings: Denmark 21 points, Portugal 19, Sweden 18, Hungary 16.
    - Group 2:
      - Latvia 3–2 Moldova
      - Greece 2–1 Luxembourg
      - **Switzerland** 0–0 Israel
        - Final standings: Switzerland 21 points, Greece 20, Latvia 17, Israel 16.
    - Group 3:
      - Czech Republic 0–0 Northern Ireland
      - San Marino 0–3 Slovenia
      - Poland 0–1 **Slovakia**
        - Slovakia qualify for the World Cup for the first time thanks to Seweryn Gancarczyk's own goal in the 3rd minute.
        - Final standings: Slovakia 22 points, Slovenia 20, Czech Republic 16, Northern Ireland 15.
    - Group 4:
      - Azerbaijan 1–1 Russia
      - **Germany** 1–1 Finland
      - Liechtenstein 0–2 Wales
        - Final standings: Germany 26 points, Russia 22, Finland 18.
    - Group 5:
      - Bosnia and Herzegovina 2–5 **Spain**
      - Estonia 2–0 Belgium
      - Turkey 2–0 Armenia
        - Final standings: Spain 30 points, Bosnia and Herzegovina 19, Turkey 15.
    - Group 6:
      - Kazakhstan 1–2 Croatia
      - Andorra 0–6 Ukraine
      - **England** 3–0 Belarus
        - Final standings: England 27 points, Ukraine 21, Croatia 20.
    - Group 7:
      - Lithuania 2–1 **Serbia**
      - Romania 3–1 Faroe Islands
      - France 3–1 Austria
        - Final standings: Serbia 22 points, France 21, Austria 14.
    - Group 8:
      - **Italy** 3–2 Cyprus
      - Republic of Ireland 0–0 Montenegro
      - Bulgaria 6–2 Georgia
        - Final standings: Italy 24 points, Ireland 18, Bulgaria 14.
  - CONMEBOL round 18:
    - Peru 1–0 Bolivia
    - **Brazil** 0–0 Venezuela
    - **Chile** 1–0 Ecuador
    - Uruguay 0–1 **Argentina**
    - **Paraguay** 0–2 Colombia
      - Final standings: Brazil 34 points, Chile, Paraguay 33, Argentina 28, Uruguay 24, Ecuador, Colombia 23, Venezuela 22, Bolivia 15, Peru 13.
  - CONCACAF fourth round, matchday 10:
    - El Salvador 0–1 **Honduras**
    - Trinidad and Tobago 2–2 **Mexico**
    - **United States** 2–2 Costa Rica
      - Jonathan Bornstein's goal in injury time for USA sends Honduras to the World Cup for the first time since 1982 and Costa Rica to a playoff series against Uruguay.
      - Final standings: United States 20 points, Mexico 19, Honduras 16 (goal difference +6), Costa Rica 16 (GD 0), El Salvador 8, Trinidad & Tobago 6.
- Women's Copa Libertadores in Santos and Guarujá, Brazil:
  - Group 2:
    - **Universidad Autónoma** (Paraguay) 4–3 (Uruguay) Rampla Juniors
    - San Lorenzo (Argentina) 1–6 (Colombia) **Formas Íntimas**
      - Final standings: Universidad Autónoma 12 points, Formas Íntimas 9, (Ecuador) Deportivo Quito & San Lorenzo 4, Rampla Juniors 0.

==== Taekwondo ====
- World Championships in Copenhagen, Denmark:
  - Men's 80 kg: (gold) Steven López (USA) (silver) Nicolás García (ESP) (bronze) Rashad Ahmadov (AZE) & Sébastien Michaud (CAN)
  - Men's +87 kg: (gold) Daba Modibo Keita (MLI) (silver) Nam Yun-Bae (KOR) (bronze) Hossein Tajik (IRI) & Arman Chilmanov (KAZ)
  - Women's 67 kg: (gold) Gwladys Épangue (FRA) (silver) Taimí Castellanos (CUB) (bronze) Sandra Šarić (CRO) & Nikolina Kursar (NOR)

==== Volleyball ====
- NORCECA Men's Championship in Bayamón, Puerto Rico: (teams in **bold** advance to the semifinals, teams in italics advance to the quarterfinals)
  - Group A:
    - Dominican Republic 3–0 Barbados
    - Puerto Rico 0–3 **Cuba**
      - Final standings: Cuba 6 points, Puerto Rico 5, Dominican Republic 4, Barbados 3.
  - Group B:
    - Mexico 3–0 Panama
    - **United States** 3–1 Canada
      - Final standings: USA 6 points, Canada 5, Mexico 4, Panama 3.

=== October 13, 2009 (Tuesday) ===
==== Basketball ====
- Africa Championship for Women in Antananarivo, Madagascar: (teams in **bold** advance to the quarterfinals)
  - Group A:
    - Madagascar 39–90 **Senegal**
    - South Africa 47–54 **Mozambique**
    - Cameroon 108–36 Mauritius
      - Standings: Senegal 8 points, Mozambique 7, Cameroon, Madagascar 6, South Africa 5, Mauritius 4.
  - Group B:
    - **Mali** 63–51 **Angola**
    - Rwanda 53–59 Tunisia
    - **Ivory Coast** 44–41 **Nigeria**
      - Standings: Mali, Côte d'Ivoire, Angola 7 points, Nigeria 6, Tunisia 5, Rwanda 4.

==== Cricket ====
- Kenya in Zimbabwe:
  - 2nd ODI in Harare:
    - Zimbabwe 263/7 (50 ov); Kenya 177 (44.5 ov). **Zimbabwe win by 86 runs, lead 5-match series 2–0.**

==== Football (soccer) ====
- U-20 World Cup in Egypt:
  - Semifinals:
    - **Ghana** 3–2 Hungary
      - Ghana advance to the final for the 3rd time.
    - **Brazil** 1–0 Costa Rica
      - Brazil advance to the final for the 7th time.
- Women's Copa Libertadores in Santos and Guarujá, Brazil: (teams in **bold** advance to the semifinals)
  - Group 1:
    - Caracas (Venezuela) 2–2 (Bolivia) EnForma Santa Cruz
    - **Santos** (Brazil) 3–1 (Chile) **Everton**
      - Final standings: Santos 12 points, Everton 7, (Peru) White Star 6, Caracas 2, EnForma Santa Cruz 1.
- U.S. national team and FC Sochaux-Montbéliard forward Charlie Davies suffers several broken bones and a lacerated bladder in a car accident near Washington, D.C. that kills a fellow passenger. (AP via Yahoo)

==== Volleyball ====
- NORCECA Men's Championship in Bayamón, Puerto Rico: (teams in italics advance to the quarterfinals)
  - Group A:
    - Barbados 0–3 Cuba
    - Dominican Republic 0–3 Puerto Rico
      - Standings: Cuba, Puerto Rico 4 points, Dominican Republic, Barbados 2.
  - Group B:
    - Mexico 1–3 Canada
    - Panama 0–3 United States
      - Standings: USA, Canada 4 points, Mexico, Panama 2.

=== October 12, 2009 (Monday) ===
==== American football ====
- NFL Monday Night Football Week 5:
  - Miami Dolphins 31, New York Jets 27
    - A wild fourth quarter that saw five lead changes is capped off by Ronnie Brown's 2-yard run for the winning touchdown with 6 seconds left.

==== Baseball ====
- Major League Baseball postseason:
  - NLDS:
    - Game 4: Philadelphia Phillies 5, Colorado Rockies 4. **Phillies win best-of-5 series 3–1.**
      - With the Phillies 4–2 down and two out in the top of the 9th inning, Ryan Howard hits a 2-run double to even the score, and Jayson Werth singles to bring Howard home for the winning run.

==== Cricket ====
- Kenya in Zimbabwe:
  - 1st ODI in Harare:
    - Zimbabwe 313/4 (50 ov, Hamilton Masakadza 156); Kenya 222 (49.5 ov). **Zimbabwe win by 91 runs, lead 5-match series 1–0.**

==== Football (soccer) ====
- Women's Copa Libertadores in Santos and Guarujá, Brazil: (teams in **bold** advance to the semifinals)
  - Group 2:
    - Rampla Juniors (Uruguay) 0–4 (Ecuador) Deportivo Quito
    - Universidad Autónoma (Paraguay) 4–0 (Argentina) San Lorenzo
      - Standings: Universidad Autónoma 9 points (3 games), Formas Íntimas 6 (3), San Lorenzo 4 (3), Deportivo Quito 4 (4), Rampla Juniors 0 (3).

==== Futsal ====
- Confederations Cup in Libya:
  - Libya 0–1 Iran
    - Final standings: (gold) Iran 12 points, (silver) Uruguay 6, (bronze) Libya 6, Guatemala 4, Solomon Islands 1.

==== Volleyball ====
- NORCECA Men's Championship in Bayamón, Puerto Rico:
  - Group A:
    - Cuba 3–0 Dominican Republic
    - Puerto Rico 3–0 Barbados
  - Group B:
    - United States 3–0 Mexico
    - Canada 3–0 Panama

=== October 11, 2009 (Sunday) ===
==== American football ====
- NFL Week 5 (unbeaten teams in **bold**):
  - **Minnesota Vikings** 38, St. Louis Rams 10
  - **New York Giants** 44, Oakland Raiders 7
    - Eli Manning, starting despite plantar fasciitis, becomes the 34th quarterback in NFL history to post a perfect passer rating.
  - Cincinnati Bengals 17, Baltimore Ravens 14
    - Carson Palmer connects with Andre Caldwell on the winning 20-yard touchdown pass with 27 seconds left.
  - Pittsburgh Steelers 28, Detroit Lions 20
  - Carolina Panthers 20, Washington Redskins 17
  - Cleveland Browns 6, Buffalo Bills 3
    - The Browns pick up their first win of the year, thanks to a Billy Cundiff field goal with 26 seconds left.
  - Philadelphia Eagles 33, Tampa Bay Buccaneers 14
  - Dallas Cowboys 26, Kansas City Chiefs 20 (OT)
    - Miles Austin, substituting for the injured Roy Williams, gains 250 of Tony Romo's 351 passing yards, including the game-winning TD.
  - Seattle Seahawks 41, Jacksonville Jaguars 0
  - Atlanta Falcons 45, San Francisco 49ers 10
  - Arizona Cardinals 28, Houston Texans 21
    - The Cardinals preserve the win with a goal-line stand in the final minute.
  - **Denver Broncos** 20, New England Patriots 17 (OT)
    - Matt Prater's 41-yard field goal keeps the Broncos unbeaten.
  - Sunday Night Football: **Indianapolis Colts** 31, Tennessee Titans 9
    - Peyton Manning becomes only the third quarterback, after Steve Young and Kurt Warner, to throw for 300 or more yards in each of the season's first five games.
  - Bye week: Chicago Bears, Green Bay Packers, **New Orleans Saints**, San Diego Chargers

==== Athletics ====
- Chicago Marathon:
  - Men: (gold) Samuel Wanjiru (KEN) 2:05:41
  - Women: (gold) Liliya Shobukhova (RUS) 2:25:56

==== Auto racing ====
- Chase for the Sprint Cup:
  - Pepsi 500 in Fontana, California:
    - (1) Jimmie Johnson (California) (Chevrolet, Hendrick Motorsports) (2) Jeff Gordon (California) (Chevrolet, Hendrick Motorsports) (3) Juan Pablo Montoya (Colombia) (Chevrolet, Earnhardt Ganassi Racing)
      - Drivers' standings (with 6 races remaining): (1) Johnson 5728 points (2) Mark Martin (Arkansas) (Chevrolet, Hendrick Motorsports) 5716 (3) Montoya 5670
- V8 Supercars:
  - Supercheap Auto Bathurst 1000 in Bathurst, New South Wales:
    - Race 18: (1) Will Davison (AUS) & Garth Tander (AUS) (Holden Commodore) (2) Jason Richards (NZL) & Cameron McConville (AUS) (Holden Commodore) (3) Lee Holdsworth (AUS) & Michael Caruso (AUS) (Holden Commodore)
      - Drivers' standings (after 18 of 26 races): (1) Jamie Whincup (AUS) (Ford Falcon) 2475 points (2) Davison 2382 (3) Tander 2037

==== Baseball ====
- Major League Baseball postseason (all times EDT):
  - ALDS:
    - Game 3: Los Angeles Angels of Anaheim 7, Boston Red Sox 6. **Angels win best-of-5 series 3–0.**
      - The Angels, trailing 6–4 with two out in the top of the 9th inning, explode for three runs, capped off by Vladimir Guerrero's two-run single, and close out the Bosox for the series sweep.
    - Game 3: New York Yankees 4, Minnesota Twins 1. **Yankees win best-of-5 series 3–0.**
  - NLDS:
    - Game 3: Philadelphia Phillies 6, Colorado Rockies 5. **Phillies lead best-of-5 series 2–1.**

==== Basketball ====
- Euroleague:
  - Second preliminary round, game 2: (first leg score in parentheses)
    - ALBA Berlin (Germany) 75–70 (70–79) (Greece) **Maroussi**. Maroussi win 149–145 on aggregate.
- Africa Championship for Women in Antananarivo, Madagascar: (teams in **bold** advance to the quarterfinals)
  - Group A:
    - South Africa 73–101 Madagascar
    - Cameroon 39–68 **Senegal**
    - Mauritius 31–121 Mozambique
      - Standings: Senegal 6 points, Mozambique, Madagascar 5, Cameroon, South Africa 4, Mauritius 3.
  - Group B:
    - Rwanda 48–72 Mali
    - Ivory Coast 55–65 **Angola**
    - Nigeria 65–49 Tunisia
      - Standings: Angola 6 points, Côte d'Ivoire, Mali, Nigeria 5, Tunisia, Rwanda 3.

==== Football (soccer) ====
- 2010 FIFA World Cup qualification: (teams in **bold** qualify for 2010 FIFA World Cup, teams in italics qualify for 2010 African Cup of Nations)
  - CONMEBOL round 17:
    - Bolivia 2–1 **Brazil**
      - Standings: Brazil, **Paraguay** 33 points, **Chile** 30, Argentina 25, Uruguay 24, Ecuador 23.
  - CAF third round, matchday 5:
    - Group B:
      - Nigeria 1–0 Mozambique
      - Tunisia 1–0 Kenya
        - Standings: Tunisia 11 points, Nigeria 9, Mozambique 4, Kenya 3.
    - Group C:
      - Algeria 3–1 Rwanda
        - Standings: Algeria 13 points, Egypt 10, Zambia 4, Rwanda 1.
    - Group D:
      - Benin 1–0 **Ghana**
      - Mali 1–0 Sudan
        - Standings: Ghana 12 points, Mali 8, Benin 7, Sudan 1.
    - Group E:
      - Guinea 1–2 Burkina Faso
        - Standings: **Côte d'Ivoire** 13 points, Burkina Faso 9, Malawi 4, Guinea 3.

==== Futsal ====
- Confederations Cup in Libya:
  - Uruguay 3–4 Guatemala
    - Standings: Iran 9 points (3 matches), Uruguay 6 (4), Libya 6 (3), Guatemala 4 (4), Solomon Islands 1 (4).

==== Golf ====
- PGA Tour:
  - Presidents Cup in San Francisco, day 4
    - Singles matches:
      - Hunter Mahan (USA) defeats Camilo Villegas (International Team) 2&1
      - Stewart Cink (USA) defeats Adam Scott (Int) 4&3
      - Mike Weir (Int) and Justin Leonard (USA) halved
      - Anthony Kim (USA) defeats Robert Allenby (Int) 5&3
      - Geoff Ogilvy (Int) defeats Steve Stricker (USA) 2&1
      - Sean O'Hair (USA) defeats Ernie Els (Int) 6&4
      - Ryo Ishikawa (Int) defeats Kenny Perry (USA) 2&1
      - Tim Clark (Int) defeats Zach Johnson (USA) 4&3
      - Tiger Woods (USA) defeats Y.E. Yang (Int) 6&5
      - Vijay Singh (Int) and Lucas Glover (USA) halved
      - Phil Mickelson (USA) defeats Retief Goosen (Int) 2&1
      - Ángel Cabrera (Int) defeats Jim Furyk (USA) 4&3
    - Final score: **U.S. Team** 19½–14½ International Team
      - The United States win the Cup for the third straight time.
- European Tour:
  - Madrid Masters in Madrid, Spain:
    - Winner: Ross McGowan (ENG) 263 (−25)
      - After shooting 60 on Saturday, McGowan eases to a three-shot win over Mikko Ilonen (FIN) for his first European Tour title.

==== Rugby union ====
- Heineken Cup pool stage, matchday 1:
  - Pool 3: Leicester Tigers (England) 32–32 (Wales) Ospreys
  - Pool 5: Toulouse (France) 36–17 (England) Sale Sharks
- Amlin Challenge Cup pool stage, matchday 1:
  - Pool 3: Saracens (England) 36–12 (Italy) Rovigo
  - Pool 4: London Wasps (England) 18–13 (France) Racing Métro

==== Snooker ====
- Grand Prix in Glasgow, Scotland, final: (seeding in parentheses)
  - Neil Robertson (AUS) (9) def. Ding Junhui (CHN) (13) 9–4

==== Tennis ====
- ATP World Tour:
  - China Open in Beijing, China:
    - Final: Novak Djokovic (SRB) def. Marin Čilić (CRO), 6–2, 7–6(4)
      - Djokovic wins his 3rd title of the year and 14th of his career.
  - Rakuten Japan Open in Tokyo, Japan:
    - Final: Jo-Wilfried Tsonga (FRA) def. Mikhail Youzhny (RUS), 6–3, 6–3
      - Tsonga wins his 3rd title of the year and 5th of his career.
- WTA Tour:
  - China Open in Beijing, China:
    - Final: Svetlana Kuznetsova (RUS) def. Agnieszka Radwańska (POL), 6–2, 6–4
      - Kuznetsova wins her 3rd title of the year and 12th of her career.

=== October 10, 2009 (Saturday) ===
==== American football ====
- NCAA:
  - AP Top 10 (unbeaten teams in **bold**):
    - (1) **Florida** 13, (4) LSU 3
    - (2) **Texas** 38, Colorado 14
    - (3) **Alabama** 22, (20) Mississippi 3
    - (5) Virginia Tech 48, Boston College 14
    - (9) Ohio State 31, Wisconsin 13
    - (10) **TCU** 20, Air Force 17
    - Idle: (6) **Boise State**, (8) **Cincinnati**
  - Other games:
    - Arkansas 44, (17) Auburn 23
  - Other remaining unbeaten teams (rankings in parentheses):
    - (12) Iowa, (16) Kansas, (23) South Florida (idle)

==== Auto racing ====
- IndyCar Series:
  - Firestone Indy 300 in Homestead, Florida:
    - (1) Dario Franchitti (GBR) (Chip Ganassi Racing) (2) Ryan Briscoe (AUS) (Penske Racing) (3) Scott Dixon (NZL) (Chip Ganassi Racing)
      - Franchitti, who needed to win the race to claim the season title, takes advantage of the first caution-free race in the history of the series, and passes Briscoe with seven laps to go after he had to pit for fuel and holds on for the victory.
  - Final drivers' standings: (1) Franchitti 616 points (2) Dixon 605 (3) Briscoe 604
- Nationwide Series:
  - Copart 300 in Fontana, California:
    - (1) Joey Logano (Connecticut) (Toyota, Joe Gibbs Racing) (2) Brian Vickers (North Carolina) (Toyota, Braun Racing) (3) Carl Edwards (Missouri) (Ford, Roush Fenway Racing)

==== Baseball ====
- Major League Baseball postseason:
  - NLDS:
    - Game 3, Los Angeles Dodgers 5, St. Louis Cardinals 1. **Dodgers win best-of-5 series 3–0.**
    - Game 3, Philadelphia Phillies at Colorado Rockies, postponed (ice). **Best-of-5 series tied 1–1.**

==== Basketball ====
- Africa Championship for Women in Antananarivo, Madagascar:
  - Group A:
    - Mauritius 29–70 South Africa
    - Madagascar 39–67 Cameroon
    - Mozambique 37–73 Senegal
  - Group B:
    - Mali 52–62 Ivory Coast
    - Nigeria 79–49 Rwanda
    - Tunisia 56–62 Angola

==== Cricket ====
- ICC Intercontinental Cup in Kwekwe, day 4:
  - Kenya 333 & 254; Zimbabwe XI 352 & 238/5 (62.5 ov, Vusi Sibanda 116 *). **Zimbabwe XI win by 5 wickets**.
    - Standings: Scotland 29 points (2 matches), Kenya 23 (3), Zimbabwe XI, Afghanistan 23 (2), Netherlands 15 (2), Ireland 12 (2), Canada 3 (3).

==== Football (soccer) ====
- 2010 FIFA World Cup qualification: (teams in **bold** qualify for 2010 FIFA World Cup, teams in italics secure at least a play-off berth)
  - UEFA:
    - Group 1:
      - **Denmark** 1–0 Sweden
      - Portugal 3–0 Hungary
        - Standings: Denmark 21 points, Portugal 16, Sweden 15, Hungary 13.
    - Group 2:
      - Luxembourg 0–3 Switzerland
      - Greece 5–2 Latvia
      - Israel 3–1 Moldova
        - Standings: Switzerland 20 points, Greece 17, Israel 15, Latvia 14.
    - Group 3:
      - Slovakia 0–2 Slovenia
      - Czech Republic 2–0 Poland
        - Standings: Slovakia 19 points, Slovenia 17, Czech Republic 15, Northern Ireland 14.
    - Group 4:
      - Finland 2–1 Wales
      - Russia 0–1 **Germany**
      - Liechtenstein 0–2 Azerbaijan
        - Standings: Germany 25 points, Russia 21, Finland 17.
    - Group 5:
      - Armenia 1–2 **Spain**
      - Estonia 0–2 Bosnia and Herzegovina
      - Belgium 2–0 Turkey
        - Standings: Spain 27 points, Bosnia and Herzegovina 19, Turkey 12.
    - Group 6:
      - Belarus 4–0 Kazakhstan
      - Ukraine 1–0 **England**
        - Standings: England 24 points, Ukraine 18, Croatia 17.
    - Group 7:
      - Austria 2–1 Lithuania
      - **Serbia** 5–0 Romania
      - France 5–0 Faroe Islands
        - Standings: Serbia 22 points, France 18, Austria 14.
    - Group 8:
      - Cyprus 4–1 Bulgaria
      - Montenegro 2–1 Georgia
      - Republic of Ireland 2–2 **Italy**
        - Standings: Italy 21 points, Ireland 17, Bulgaria 11.
  - CONMEBOL round 17:
    - Colombia 2–4 **Chile**
    - Venezuela 1–2 **Paraguay**
    - Ecuador 1–2 Uruguay
    - Argentina 2–1 Peru
      - Standings: Brazil 33 points (16 matches), Paraguay 33 (17), Chile 30 (17), Argentina 25 (17), Uruguay 24 (17), Ecuador 23 (17), Venezuela 21 (17), Colombia 20 (17).
  - CAF third round, matchday 5:
    - Group A:
      - Cameroon 3–0 Togo
      - Gabon 3–1 Morocco
        - Standings: Cameroon 10 points, Gabon 9, Togo 5, Morocco 3.
    - Group C:
      - Zambia 0–1 Egypt
        - Standings: Algeria 10 points (4 matches), Egypt 10 (5), Zambia 4 (5), Rwanda 1 (4).
    - Group E:
      - Malawi 1–1 **Ivory Coast**
        - Standings: Côte d'Ivoire 13 points (5 matches), Burkina Faso 6 (4), Malawi 4 (5), Guinea 3 (4).
  - CONCACAF fourth round, matchday 9:
    - **Mexico** 4–1 El Salvador
    - Costa Rica 4–0 Trinidad and Tobago
    - Honduras 2–3 **United States**
      - Standings: United States 19 points, Mexico 18, Costa Rica 15, Honduras 13, El Salvador 8, Trinidad & Tobago 5.
  - OFC / AFC Intercontinental Playoffs, first leg:
    - Bahrain 0–0 New Zealand
- U-20 World Cup in Egypt:
  - Quarterfinals:
    - **Brazil** 2–1 (ET) Germany
    - United Arab Emirates 1–2 (ET) **Costa Rica**
- CAF Champions League semifinals, second leg: (first leg score in parentheses)
  - Kano Pillars (Nigeria) 0–1 (0–4) (Nigeria) **Heartland**. Heartland win 5–0 on aggregate.
- Women's Copa Libertadores in Santos and Guarujá, Brazil:
  - Group 1:
    - EnForma Santa Cruz (Bolivia) 2–4 (Peru) White Star
    - Santos (Brazil) 11–0 (Venezuela) Caracas
      - Standings: Santos 9 points (3), Everton 7 (3), White Star 6 (4), Caracas 1 (3), EnForma Santa Cruz 0 (3).
  - Group 2:
    - Deportivo Quito (Ecuador) 1–4 (Paraguay) Universidad Autónoma
    - Formas Íntimas (Colombia) 5–0 (Uruguay) Rampla Juniors
      - Standings: Formas Íntimas 6 points (3 matches), Universidad Autónoma 6 (2), San Lorenzo 4 (2) Deportivo Quito 1 (3), Rampla Juniors 0 (2).

==== Futsal ====
- Confederations Cup in Libya:
  - Solomon Islands 0–6 Iran
  - Libya 2–3 Uruguay
    - Standings: Iran 9 points (3 matches), Uruguay, Libya 6 (3), Guatemala 1 (3), Solomon Islands 1 (4).

==== Golf ====
- PGA Tour:
  - Presidents Cup in San Francisco, day 3:
    - Morning foursomes:
      - Phil Mickelson/Sean O'Hair (USA) defeat Retief Goosen/Camilo Villegas (International Team) 5&3
      - Jim Furyk/Justin Leonard (USA) defeat Ernie Els/Adam Scott (Int) 4&2
      - Robert Allenby/Vijay Singh (Int) and Stewart Cink/Hunter Mahan (USA) halved
      - Steve Stricker/Tiger Woods (USA) defeat Tim Clark/Mike Weir (Int) 1 up
      - Ryo Ishikawa/Y.E. Yang (Int) defeat Zach Johnson/Kenny Perry (USA) 3&2
    - Score after morning session: U.S. Team 10–7 International Team
    - Afternoon four-balls:
      - Jim Furyk/Anthony Kim (USA) defeat Ángel Cabrera/Adam Scott (International Team) 2 up
      - Robert Allenby/Geoff Ogilvy (Int) defeat Stewart Cink/Lucas Glover (USA) 2&1
      - Ernie Els/Mike Weir (Int) defeat Zach Johnson/Justin Leonard (USA) 5&3
      - Steve Stricker/Tiger Woods (USA) defeat Ryo Ishikawa/Y.E. Yang (Int) 4&2
      - Tim Clark/Vijay Singh (Int) and Phil Mickelson/Sean O'Hair (USA) halved
    - Score: U.S. Team 12½–9½ International Team

==== Rugby league ====
- Super League Grand Final at Old Trafford:
  - Leeds Rhinos 18–10 St. Helens
    - Leeds become the first club to claim three consecutive Super League titles.

==== Rugby union ====
- Heineken Cup pool stage, matchday 1:
  - Pool 1:
    - Benetton Treviso (Italy) 9–8 (France) Perpignan
    - Northampton Saints (England) 31–27 (Ireland) Munster
  - Pool 2: Glasgow Warriors (Scotland) 18–22 (France) Biarritz
  - Pool 3: Clermont Auvergne (France) 36–18 (Italy) Viadana
  - Pool 4: Stade Français (France) 31–7 (Scotland) Edinburgh
  - Pool 5: Cardiff Blues (Wales) 20–6 (England) Harlequins
  - Pool 6: Scarlets (Wales) 24–12 (France) Brive
- Amlin Challenge Cup pool stage, matchday 1:
  - Pool 1: București Oaks (Romania) 21–9 (Italy) Overmach Parma
  - Pool 5: Petrarca Padova (Italy) 27–29 (England) Newcastle Falcons

==== Snooker ====
- Grand Prix in Glasgow, Scotland, semi-finals: (seeding in parentheses)
  - Neil Robertson (AUS) (9) def. John Higgins (SCO) (1) 6–5
  - Ding Junhui (CHN) (13) def. Mark Williams (WAL) (15) 6–1

=== October 9, 2009 (Friday) ===
==== Baseball ====
- Major League Baseball postseason:
  - ALDS:
    - Game 2: New York Yankees 4, Minnesota Twins 3 (11 innings). **Yankees lead best-of-5 series 2–0.**
      - Alex Rodriguez ties the game with a two-run homer in the 9th inning, and Mark Teixeira ends it with a walk-off homer.
    - Game 2: Los Angeles Angels of Anaheim 4, Boston Red Sox 1. **Angels lead best-of-5 series 2–0.**

==== Basketball ====
- WNBA Finals:
  - Game 5 at Phoenix: (W1) Phoenix Mercury 94, (E1) Indiana Fever 86. **Mercury win series 3–2.**
    - League MVP Diana Taurasi leads the Mercury to their second title in three years with 26 points, with Cappie Pondexter adding 24. Taurasi is also named Finals MVP.
- Euroleague:
  - Second preliminary round, game 2: (first leg score in parentheses)
    - **Orléans** (France) 80–82 (82–73) (Italy) Benetton Treviso. Orléans win 162–155 on aggregate.
- Africa Championship for Women in Antananarivo, Madagascar:
  - Group A:
    - Mozambique 55–48 Cameroon
    - Senegal 75–34 South Africa
    - Mauritius 42–86 Madagascar
  - Group B:
    - Angola 66–54 Rwanda
    - Tunisia 50–62 Ivory Coast
    - Nigeria 37–41 Mali

==== Cricket ====
- ICC Intercontinental Cup in Kwekwe, day 3:
  - Kenya 333 & 254 (74.3 ov); Zimbabwe XI 352 (103.5 ov, Vusi Sibanda 209). Zimbabwe require 236 runs with 10 wickets remaining.

==== Football (soccer) ====
- U-20 World Cup in Egypt:
  - Quarterfinals:
    - South Korea 2–3 Ghana
    - Italy 2–3 (ET) Hungary

==== Futsal ====
- Confederations Cup in Libya:
  - Iran 4–2 Uruguay
  - Solomon Islands 6–6 Guatemala
    - Standings: Iran, Libya 6 points (2 matches), Uruguay 3 (2), Guatemala, Solomon Islands 1 (3).

==== Golf ====
- PGA Tour:
  - Presidents Cup in San Francisco, day 2:
    - Four-balls:
      - Phil Mickelson/Justin Leonard (USA) defeat Retief Goosen/Adam Scott (International Team) 3 & 2
      - Ernie Els/Mike Weir (Int) defeat Jim Furyk/Anthony Kim (USA) 2 up
      - Ryo Ishikawa/Y.E. Yang (Int) defeat Kenny Perry/Sean O'Hair (USA) 4 & 3
      - Vijay Singh/Tim Clark (Int) defeat Lucas Glover/Stewart Cink (USA) 1 up
      - Zach Johnson/Hunter Mahan (USA) defeat Robert Allenby/Camilo Villegas (Int) 2 & 1
      - Tiger Woods/Steve Stricker (USA) defeat Geoff Ogilvy/Ángel Cabrera (Int) 5 & 3
    - Score: U.S. Team 6½–5½ International Team

==== Olympic Games ====
- The International Olympic Committee, following the previous recommendation of its executive board, votes to add golf and rugby union (specifically rugby sevens) to the Olympic program for the 2016 Games in Rio de Janeiro. (AP via ESPN)

==== Rugby union ====
- Heineken Cup pool stage, matchday 1:
  - Pool 2: Gloucester (England) 19–17 (Wales) Newport Gwent Dragons
  - Pool 4: Ulster (Ireland) 26–12 (England) Bath
  - Pool 6: Leinster (Ireland) 9–12 (England) London Irish
- Amlin Challenge Cup pool stage, matchday 1:
  - Pool 1: Bourgoin (France) 29–19 (England) Leeds Carnegie
  - Pool 2: Connacht (Ireland) 46–6 (Spain) Olympus Madrid
  - Pool 3: Castres Olympique (France) 17–33 (France) Toulon
  - Pool 4: Bayonne (France) 61–3 (Italy) Rugby Roma
  - Pool 5: Albi (France) 7–17 (France) Montauban

==== Snooker ====
- Grand Prix in Glasgow, Scotland, quarter-finals: (seeding in parentheses)
  - John Higgins (SCO) (1) def. Mark Allen (NIR) (11) 5–1
  - Neil Robertson (AUS) (9) def. Joe Perry (ENG) (12) 5–1
  - Ding Junhui (CHN) (13) def. Peter Ebdon (ENG) (14) 5–2
  - Mark Williams (WAL) (15) def. Robert Milkins (ENG) 5–2

=== October 8, 2009 (Thursday) ===
==== American football ====
- NCAA:
  - AP Top 25:
    - (21) Nebraska 27, (24) Missouri 12

==== Baseball ====
- Major League Baseball postseason:
  - ALDS:
    - Game 1: Los Angeles Angels of Anaheim 5, Boston Red Sox 0. **Angels lead best-of-5 series 1–0.**
  - NLDS:
    - Game 2: Colorado Rockies 5, Philadelphia Phillies 4. **Best-of-5 series tied 1–1.**
    - Game 2, Los Angeles Dodgers 3, St. Louis Cardinals 2. **Dodgers lead best-of-5 series 2–0.**
      - The Dodgers rally from 2–1 down with 2 outs and no one on base in the 9th inning, starting with a Matt Holliday error that extends the inning.

==== Basketball ====
- UAAP at Quezon City:
  - Men's Finals: Ateneo Blue Eagles 71, UE Red Warriors 58, **Ateneo win best-of-3 series 2–1**
    - Ateneo clinch their second consecutive, fifth UAAP and nineteenth men's championship, and extend UE's title drought to 25 years.
  - Juniors' Finals: Ateneo Blue Eaglets 61, De La Salle Junior Archers 56, **Ateneo win best-of-3 series 2–1**
    - Ateneo win their second consecutive, fifteenth UAAP and 24th juniors' championship, preventing La Salle from their "alternating" championship reigns with Ateneo.
- Winner Cup Final in Jerusalem:
  - Hapoel Jerusalem 86–80 Maccabi Tel Aviv

==== Cricket ====
- ICC Intercontinental Cup in Kwekwe, day 2:
  - Kenya 333 (92.3 ov); Zimbabwe XI 320/7 (91.0 ov, Vusi Sibanda 174*). Zimbabwe XI trail by 13 runs with 3 wickets remaining in the 1st innings.

==== Fencing ====
- World Championships in Antalya, Turkey:
  - Men's Team Sabre: (gold) Romania (Rareș Dumitrescu, Florin Zalomir, Tiberiu Dolniceanu, Cosmin Hănceanu) (silver) Italy (Aldo Montano, Luigi Tarantino, Diego Occhiuzzi, Giampiero Pastore) (bronze) Hungary (Tamás Decsi, Nikolász Iliász, Balázs Lontay, Áron Szilágyi)
  - Women's Team Épée: (gold) Italy (Francesca Quondamcarlo, Cristiana Cascioli, Bianca Del Carretto, Nathalie Moellhausen) (silver) Poland (Danuta Dmowska-Andrzejuk, Małgorzata Bereza, Magdalena Piekarska, Ewa Nelip) (bronze) Germany (Imke Duplitzer, Britta Heidemann, Marijana Markovic, Monika Sozanska)

==== Football (soccer) ====
- Women's Copa Libertadores in Santos and Guarujá, Brazil:
  - Group 1:
    - White Star (Peru) 1–0 (Venezuela) Caracas
    - Everton (Chile) 5–0 (Bolivia) EnForma Santa Cruz
      - Standings: Everton 7 points (3 matches), Santos 6 (2), White Star 3 (3), Caracas 1 (2), EnForma Santa Cruz 0 (2).

==== Futsal ====
- Confederations Cup in Libya:
  - Libya 3–2 Guatemala
    - Standings: Libya 6 points (2 matches), Uruguay, Iran 3 (1), Guatemala, Solomon Islands 0 (2).

==== Golf ====
- PGA Tour:
  - Presidents Cup in San Francisco, day 1:
    - Foursomes:
      - Phil Mickelson/Anthony Kim (USA) defeat Mike Weir/Tim Clark (International Team) 3&2
      - Adam Scott/Ernie Els (Int) defeat Hunter Mahan/Sean O'Hair (USA) 2&1
      - Vijay Singh/Robert Allenby (Int) defeat Lucas Glover/Stewart Cink (USA) 1 up
      - Kenny Perry/Zach Johnson (USA) defeat Ángel Cabrera/Camilo Villegas (Int) 2 up
      - Tiger Woods/Steve Stricker (USA) defeat Geoff Ogilvy/Ryo Ishikawa (Int) 6&4
      - Retief Goosen/Y.E. Yang (Int) and Jim Furyk/Justin Leonard (USA) halved
    - Score: U.S. Team 3½–2½ International Team

==== Rugby union ====
- Amlin Challenge Cup pool stage, matchday 1:
  - Pool 2: Worcester Warriors (England) 17–22 (France) Montpellier

==== Snooker ====
- Grand Prix in Glasgow, Scotland, round 2: (seeding in parentheses)
  - Mark Williams (WAL) (15) def. Stephen Hendry (SCO) (10) 5–2
  - Peter Ebdon (ENG) (14) def. Mark Davis (ENG) 5–3
  - Ding Junhui (CHN) (13) def. Stephen Maguire (SCO) (3) 5–1
  - Robert Milkins (ENG) def. Mark King (ENG) (16) 5–1

==== Volleyball ====
- Women's African Championship in Batna, Algeria:
  - Cameroon 3–0 Morocco
  - Tunisia 3–0 Senegal
  - Algeria 3–0 Botswana
    - Final standings: Algeria 10 points, Tunisia 9, Cameroon 8, Senegal 7, Botswana 6, Morocco 5.
    - Algeria win the title for the first time.

=== October 7, 2009 (Wednesday) ===
==== Baseball ====
- Major League Baseball postseason:
  - ALDS:
    - Game 1: New York Yankees 7, Minnesota Twins 2. **Yankees lead best-of-5 series 1–0.**
  - NLDS:
    - Game 1: Philadelphia Phillies 5, Colorado Rockies 1. **Phillies lead best-of-5 series 1–0.**
    - Game 1: Los Angeles Dodgers 5, St. Louis Cardinals 3. **Dodgers lead best-of-5 series 1–0.**

==== Basketball ====
- WNBA Finals:
  - Game 4 at Indianapolis: (W1) Phoenix Mercury 90, (E1) Indiana Fever 77. **Best-of-5 series tied 2–2.**

==== Cricket ====
- ICC Intercontinental Cup in Kwekwe, day 1:
  - Kenya 327/9 (91.0 ov) v Zimbabwe XI

==== Fencing ====
- World Championships in Antalya, Turkey:
  - Men's Team Épée: (gold) France (Jérôme Jeannet, Ulrich Robeiri, Jean-Michel Lucenay, Gauthier Grumier) (silver) Hungary (Péter Somfai, András Rédli, Géza Imre, Gábor Boczkó) (bronze) Poland Krzysztof Mikołajczak, Tomasz Motyka, Radosław Zawrotniak, Adam Wiercioch
  - Women's Team Foil: (gold) Italy (Valentina Vezzali, Margherita Granbassi, Arianna Errigo, Elisa Di Francisca) (silver) Russia (Aida Shanaeva, Larisa Korobeynikova, Yuliya Biryukova, Kamilla Gafurzianova) (bronze) Germany (Maria Bartkowski, Katja Wächter, Anja Schache, Carolin Golubytskyi)

==== Football (soccer) ====
- U-20 World Cup in Egypt:
  - Round of 16:
    - **Brazil** 3–1 Uruguay
    - Venezuela 1–2 **United Arab Emirates**
    - **Germany** 3–2 Nigeria
- UEFA Women's Champions League Round of 32, second leg: (first leg score in parentheses)
  - **Montpellier** (France) 3–1 (0–0) (Belgium) Standard Liège. Montpellier win 3–1 on aggregate.
  - **Neulengbach** (Austria) 0–1 (3–1) (Poland) Unia Racibórz. Neulengbach win 3–2 on aggregate.
  - Valur (Iceland) 1–2 (1–4) (Italy) **Torres**. Torres win 6–2 on aggregate.
  - **Umeå** (Sweden) 6–0 (5–0) (Ukraine) Zhilstroy-1. Umeå win 11–0 on aggregate.
  - **Brøndby** (Denmark) 1–1 (2–1) (Netherlands) AZ. Brøndby win 3–2 on aggregate.
  - **Sparta Praha** (Czech Republic) 2–0 (0–1) (Kazakhstan) Alma. Sparta Praha win 2–1 on aggregate.
  - **Lyon** (France) 5–0 (1–0) (Serbia) Mašinac Niš. Lyon win 6–0 on aggregate.
  - **Duisburg** (Germany) 6–3 (5–1) (Belarus) Universitet Vitebsk. Duisburg win 11–4 on aggregate.
  - **Rossiyanka** (Russia) 2–1 (3–1) (Spain) Rayo Vallecano. Rossiyanka win 5–2 on aggregate.
  - **Bayern Munich** (Germany) 4–2 (5–0) (Hungary) Viktória. Bayern Munich win 9–2 on aggregate.
  - **Zvezda 2005 Perm** (Russia) 5–0 (3–0) (Bosnia and Herzegovina) ZNK-SFK 2000. Zvezda 2005 Perm win 8–0 on aggregate.
  - **Turbine Potsdam** (Germany) 8–0 (8–1) (Finland) Honka. Turbine Potsdam win 16–1 on aggregate.
  - **Arsenal** (England) 9–0 (9–0) (Greece) PAOK. Arsenal win 18–0 on aggregate.
  - Everton (England) 2–0 (0–3) (Norway) **Røa IL**. Røa IL win 3–2 on aggregate.
  - **Linköping** (Sweden) 3–0 (2–0) (Switzerland) Zürich. Linköping win 5–0 on aggregate.
  - Bardolino (Italy) 2–1 (0–4) (Denmark) **Fortuna Hjørring**. Fortuna Hjørring win 5–2 on aggregate.
- Women's Copa Libertadores in Santos and Guarujá, Brazil:
  - Group 2:
    - Deportivo Quito (Ecuador) 1–5 (Colombia) Formas Íntimas
    - Rampla Juniors (Uruguay) 2–5 (Argentina) San Lorenzo
      - Standings: San Lorenzo 4 points (2 matches), Formas Íntimas 3 (2), Universidad Autónoma 3 (1), Deportivo Quito 1 (2), Rampla Juniors 0 (2).

==== Futsal ====
- Confederations Cup in Libya:
  - Iran 4–2 Guatemala
  - Solomon Islands 1–11 Uruguay

==== Snooker ====
- Grand Prix in Glasgow, Scotland, round 2: (seeding in parentheses)
  - John Higgins (SCO) (1) def. Ronnie O'Sullivan (ENG) (2) 5–4
  - Mark Allen (NIR) (11) def. Jamie Cope (ENG) 5–3
  - Neil Robertson (AUS) (9) def. Ken Doherty (IRL) 5–2
  - Joe Perry (ENG) (12) def. Barry Pinches (ENG) 5–2

==== Volleyball ====
- Women's African Championship in Batna, Algeria:
  - Senegal 3–1 Morocco
  - Cameroon 3–1 Botswana
  - Algeria 3–0 Tunisia
    - Standings: Algeria 8 points, Tunisia 7, Cameroon, Senegal 6, Botswana 5, Morocco 4.

=== October 6, 2009 (Tuesday) ===
==== Baseball ====
- Major League Baseball:
  - American League Central Division one-game playoff:
    - Minnesota Twins 6, Detroit Tigers 5 (12 innings)
      - Alexi Casilla hits a single in the 12th and drives in Carlos Gómez with the winning run, in the last regular season game at the Metrodome. The Twins become the first team in MLB history to rally from 3 games down with 4 left, and will next play the New York Yankees in the Division Series, starting on Wednesday at Yankee Stadium.
  - Other news:
    - MLB owners unanimously approve the sale of the Chicago Cubs from the Tribune Company to the family of Joe Ricketts, with his son Thomas S. Ricketts having day-to-day control. (AP via ESPN)

==== Basketball ====
- Euroleague:
  - Second preliminary round, game 1:
    - Benetton Treviso (Italy) 73–82 (France) Orléans
    - Maroussi (Greece) 79–70 (Germany) ALBA Berlin

==== Fencing ====
- World Championships in Antalya, Turkey:
  - Men's Team Foil: (gold) Italy (Andrea Baldini, Andrea Cassarà, Stefano Barrera, Simone Vanni) (silver) Germany (Peter Joppich, Benjamin Kleibrink, André Weßels, Sebastian Bachmann) (bronze) Russia (Aleksandr Stukalin, Artem Sedov, Renal Ganeyev, Aleksey Khovanskiy)
  - Women's Team Sabre: (gold) Ukraine (Olha Kharlan, Olena Khomrova, Olha Zhovnir, Halyna Pundyk) (silver) France (Cécilia Berder, Léonore Perrus, Carole Vergne, Solenne Mary) (bronze) China (Bao Yingying, Li Fei, Ni Hong, Chen Xiaodong)

==== Football (soccer) ====
- U-20 World Cup in Egypt:
  - Round of 16:
    - **Ghana** 2–1 (ET) South Africa
    - Egypt 0–2 **Costa Rica**
    - **Hungary** 2–2 (4–3 pen.) Czech Republic
- Women's Copa Libertadores in Santos and Guarujá, Brazil:
  - Group 1:
    - White Star (Peru) 1–4 (Chile) Everton
    - Santos (Brazil) 12–0 (Bolivia) EnForma Santa Cruz
      - Standings: Santos 6 points (2 matches), Everton 4 (2), Caracas 1 (1), White Star 0 (2), EnForma Santa Cruz 0 (1).
- Francophone Games in Beirut, Lebanon:
  - Final: (silver) Ivory Coast 0–0 (3–5 pen.) (gold) **Congo**

==== Futsal ====
- Confederations Cup in Libya:
  - Libya 6–5 Solomon Islands

==== Snooker ====
- Grand Prix in Glasgow, Scotland, round 1: (seeding in parentheses)
  - Ronnie O'Sullivan (ENG) (2) def. Jamie Burnett (SCO) 5–3
  - Mark Williams (WAL) (15) def. Stuart Bingham (ENG) 5–0
  - Stephen Maguire (SCO) (3) def. Nigel Bond (ENG) 5–3
  - Mark King (ENG) (16) def. Ricky Walden (ENG) 5–4

=== October 5, 2009 (Monday) ===
==== American football ====
- NFL Monday Night Football Week 4 (unbeaten team in **bold**):
  - **Minnesota Vikings** 30, Green Bay Packers 23
    - In his first game against his longtime team, Brett Favre throws for three touchdowns, while the Vikings sack his counterpart Aaron Rodgers eight times.

==== Cricket ====
- ICC Champions Trophy in South Africa:
  - Final at Centurion:
    - New Zealand 200/9 (50 ov); Australia 206/4 (45.2 ov, Shane Watson 105*). **Australia win by 6 wickets**.
      - Australia retain the Trophy and become the first team to win it twice.

==== Fencing ====
- World Championships in Antalya, Turkey:
  - Men's Sabre: (gold) Nicolas Limbach (GER) (silver) Rareș Dumitrescu (ROU) (bronze) Tamás Decsi (HUN) & Luigi Tarantino (ITA)
  - Women's Épée: (gold) Lyubov Shutova (RUS) (silver) Sherraine Schalm (CAN) (bronze) Sonja Tol (NED) & Anfisa Pochkalova (UKR)

==== Football (soccer) ====
- U-20 World Cup in Egypt:
  - Round of 16:
    - Spain 1–3 **Italy**
    - Paraguay 0–3 **South Korea**
- Women's Copa Libertadores in Santos and Guarujá, Brazil:
  - Group 2:
    - Universidad Autónoma (Paraguay) 3–2 (Colombia) Formas Íntimas
    - San Lorenzo (Argentina) 1–1 (Ecuador) Deportivo Quito
- Francophone Games in Beirut, Lebanon:
  - Bronze medal match: (bronze) **Morocco** 3–1 Canada

==== Golf ====
- PGA Tour:
  - Fall Series:
    - Turning Stone Resort Championship in Verona, New York:
      - Winner: Matt Kuchar (USA) 271 (−17) PO
        - Kuchar defeats Vaughn Taylor (USA) on the sixth playoff hole and wins on tour for the first time since 2002.
- European Tour:
  - Alfred Dunhill Links Championship in Scotland:
    - Winner: Simon Dyson (ENG) 268 (−20)

==== Snooker ====
- Grand Prix in Glasgow, Scotland, round 1: (seeding in parentheses)
  - Stephen Hendry (SCO) (10) def. Matthew Selt (ENG) 5–2
  - Peter Ebdon (ENG) (14) def. Liang Wenbo (CHN) 5–2
  - Barry Pinches (ENG) def. Shaun Murphy (ENG) (4) 5–4
  - Mark Allen (NIR) (11) def. Ian McCulloch (ENG) 5–3

==== Volleyball ====
- Asian Men's Championship in Manila, Philippines:
  - Seventh place match: **Australia** 3–0 Chinese Taipei
  - Fifth place match: **Kazakhstan** 3–1 Indonesia
  - Bronze medal match: (bronze) **South Korea** 3–1 China
  - Final: (silver) Iran 1–3 (gold) **Japan**
    - Japan win the title for the seventh time. Iran qualify for the World Grand Champions Cup as Asia representative because Japan has already qualified as host.
- Women's African Championship in Batna, Algeria:
  - Tunisia 3–0 Botswana
  - Cameroon 3–0 Senegal
  - Algeria 3–0 Morocco
    - Standings: Tunisia, Algeria 6 points, Cameroon, Botswana, Senegal 4, Morocco 3.

=== October 4, 2009 (Sunday) ===
==== American football ====
- NFL Week 4 (unbeaten teams in **bold**):
  - Washington Redskins 16, Tampa Bay Buccaneers 13
  - **Indianapolis Colts** 34, Seattle Seahawks 17
    - Peyton Manning leads the Colts to 4–0, throwing for 353 yards and two touchdowns.
  - Jacksonville Jaguars 37, Tennessee Titans 17
    - David Garrard throws for 323 yards and three TDs for the Jags.
  - Chicago Bears 48, Detroit Lions 24
  - **New York Giants** 27, Kansas City Chiefs 16
  - Houston Texans 29, Oakland Raiders 6
  - New England Patriots 27, Baltimore Ravens 21
  - Cincinnati Bengals 23, Cleveland Browns 20 (OT)
    - Shayne Graham's 31-yard field goal with 7 seconds left in overtime sends the Bengals to 3–1.
  - Miami Dolphins 38, Buffalo Bills 10
  - **New Orleans Saints** 24, New York Jets 10
    - The Saints go to 4–0 for the first time since 1993 with defense, scoring TDs off a Mark Sanchez interception and a fumble recovery.
  - San Francisco 49ers 35, St. Louis Rams 0
    - The Niners score three defensive TDs.
  - **Denver Broncos** 17, Dallas Cowboys 10
    - Champ Bailey breaks up a potential tying TD pass with 1 second left to keep the Broncos unbeaten.
  - Sunday Night Football: Pittsburgh Steelers 38, San Diego Chargers 28
    - The Steelers are led by Ben Roethlisberger with 333 yards and two TDs passing and Rashard Mendenhall's 165 yards and two TDs rushing.
  - Bye week: Arizona Cardinals, Atlanta Falcons, Carolina Panthers, Philadelphia Eagles

==== Auto racing ====
- Formula One:
  - Japanese Grand Prix in Suzuka:
    - (1) Sebastian Vettel (GER) (Red Bull–Renault) 1:28:20.443 (2) Jarno Trulli (ITA) (Toyota) +4.877 (3) Lewis Hamilton (GBR) (McLaren–Mercedes) +6.472
      - Drivers' standings (after 15 of 17 races): (1) Jenson Button (GBR) (Brawn-Mercedes) 85 points (2) Rubens Barrichello (BRA) (Brawn-Mercedes) 71 (3) Vettel 69
      - Constructors' standings: (1) Brawn-Mercedes 156 (2) Red Bull-Renault 120.5 (3) Ferrari 67
- Chase for the Sprint Cup:
  - Price Chopper 400 in Kansas City, Kansas:
    - (1) Tony Stewart (Indiana) (Chevrolet, Stewart Haas Racing) (2) Jeff Gordon (California) (Chevrolet, Hendrick Motorsports) (3) Greg Biffle (Washington (state)) (Ford, Roush Fenway Racing)
      - Drivers' standings (with 7 races remaining): (1) Mark Martin (Arkansas) (Chevrolet, Hendrick Motorsports) 5551 points (2) Jimmie Johnson (California) (Chevrolet, Hendrick Motorsports) 5533 (3) Juan Pablo Montoya (Colombia) (Chevrolet, Earnhardt Ganassi Racing) 5500
- World Rally Championship:
  - Rally Catalunya:
    - (1) Sébastien Loeb (FRA) (Citroën C4 WRC) 3:22:14.7 (2) Dani Sordo (ESP) (Citroën C4 WRC) +12.0 (3) Mikko Hirvonen (FIN) (Ford Focus RS WRC 09) +54.1
      - Drivers' championship (after 11 of 12 races): (1) Hirvonen 84 points (2) Loeb 83 (3) Sordo 58
      - Manufacturers' championship: (1) Citroën Total 151 points (2) BP Ford Abu Dhabi 130 (3) Stobart VK M-Sport Ford 73

==== Baseball ====
- Major League Baseball Final day of regular season: (teams in italics tie for division title)
  - American League:
    - Detroit Tigers 5, Chicago White Sox 3
    - Minnesota Twins 13, Kansas City Royals 4
      - The Tigers and Twins finish in a tie for the Central Division title. They will play a one-game playoff on October 6 at the Metrodome, which will be the last regular-season game there. The Twins become the first team in MLB history to play a one-game playoff two straight years.
    - Alex Rodriguez sets an AL record for RBI in an inning with 7, hitting two homers, one of them a grand slam, in the sixth inning of the New York Yankees' 10–2 win over the Tampa Bay Rays. With his second homer, Rodriguez becomes the first player in MLB history to hit 30 HRs and 100 RBIs in 13 seasons.

==== Basketball ====
- WNBA Finals:
  - Game 3 at Indianapolis: (E1) Indiana Fever 86, (W1) Phoenix Mercury 85. **Fever lead best-of-5 series 2–1.**

==== Fencing ====
- World Championships in Antalya, Turkey:
  - Men's Épée: (gold) Anton Avdeev (RUS) (silver) Matteo Tagliariol (ITA) (bronze) Jose Luis Abajo (ESP) & Jérôme Jeannet (FRA)
  - Women's Foil: (gold) Aida Shanaeva (RUS) (silver) Jeon Hee Sook (KOR) (bronze) Arianna Errigo (ITA) & Elisa Di Francisca (ITA)

==== Football (soccer) ====
- CAF Champions League semifinals, first leg:
  - Heartland (Nigeria) 4–0 (Nigeria) Kano Pillars
  - Al-Hilal (Sudan) 2–5 (Democratic Republic of the Congo) TP Mazembe
- Women's Copa Libertadores in Santos and Guarujá, Brazil:
  - Group 1: Caracas (Venezuela) 0–0 (Chile) Everton

==== Golf ====
- Senior majors:
  - Constellation Energy Senior Players Championship in Timonium, Maryland:
    - (1) Jay Haas (USA) 267 (−13) (2) Tom Watson (USA) 268 (−12) (3) Loren Roberts & Mark Wiebe (both United States) 273 (−7)
      - Haas' final-round 64 enables him to chase down Watson for his third senior major.
- PGA Tour:
  - Fall Series:
    - Turning Stone Resort Championship in Verona, New York:
      - Tied for lead: Matt Kuchar & Vaughn Taylor (both United States) 271 (−17); playoff called off after two holes due to darkness and will resume Monday
- European Tour:
  - Alfred Dunhill Links Championship in Scotland:
    - Play was called off on Saturday due to gale-force winds at all three courses hosting the event. The third round was played today, and the final round will be played at St Andrews on Monday.
- LPGA Tour:
  - Navistar LPGA Classic in Prattville, Alabama:
    - Winner: Lorena Ochoa (MEX) 270 (−18)

==== Horse racing ====
- Prix de l'Arc de Triomphe in Paris
  - Winner: Sea the Stars (jockey: Michael Kinane, trainer: John Oxx)
    - Sea the Stars becomes the first horse ever to win the 2,000 Guineas, Epsom Derby, and the Arc.

==== Motorcycle racing ====
- Moto GP:
  - Portuguese Grand Prix in Estoril
    - (1) Jorge Lorenzo (ESP) (Yamaha) 45:35.522 (2) Casey Stoner (AUS) (Ducati) +6.294 (3) Dani Pedrosa (ESP) (Honda) +9.889
      - Drivers' standings (after 14 of 17 races): (1) Valentino Rossi (ITA) (Yamaha) 250 points (2) Lorenzo 232 (3) Pedrosa 175
      - Manufacturers' standings: (1) Yamaha 330 (2) Honda 236 (3) Ducati 211
- Superbike:
  - Magny-Cours Superbike World Championship round in Magny-Cours, France
    - Race 1: (1) Ben Spies (USA) (Yamaha) 37:57.110 (2) Noriyuki Haga (JPN) (Ducati) +0.181 (3) Max Biaggi (ITA) (Aprilia) +5.009
    - Race 2: (1) Haga 38:00.282 (2) Biaggi +1.480 (3) Jonathan Rea (GBR) (Honda) +6.024
      - Riders' standings (after 13 of 14 rounds): (1) Haga 436 points (2) Spies 426 (3) Michel Fabrizio (ITA) (Ducati) 346
      - Manufacturers' standings: (1) Ducati 534 points (2) Yamaha 469 (3) Honda 395

==== Rugby league ====
- NRL Finals Series:
  - Grand Final in Sydney:
    - Parramatta Eels 16–23 **Melbourne Storm**
      - The Storm win the premiership for the third time.

==== Snooker ====
- Grand Prix in Glasgow, Scotland, round 1: (seeding in parentheses)
  - Robert Milkins (ENG) def. Ali Carter (ENG) (5) 5–1
  - Ding Junhui (CHN) (13) def. Matthew Stevens (WAL) 5–4
  - Jamie Cope (ENG) def. Ryan Day (WAL) (6) 5–3
  - Neil Robertson (AUS) (9) def. Gerard Greene (NIR) 5–3

==== Tennis ====
- ATP World Tour:
  - PTT Thailand Open in Bangkok, Thailand:
    - Final: Gilles Simon (FRA) def. Viktor Troicki (SRB) 7–5, 6–3
      - Simon wins his first title of the year and 6th of his career.
  - Malaysian Open in Kuala Lumpur, Malaysia:
    - Final: Nikolay Davydenko (RUS) def. Fernando Verdasco (ESP) 6–4, 7–5
      - Davydenko wins his third title of the year and 17th of his career.

==== Volleyball ====
- European Women's Championship in Poland:
  - Bronze medal match: (bronze) **Poland** 3–0 Germany
  - Final: (silver) Netherlands 0–3 (gold) **Italy**
    - Italy win the title for the second straight time and qualify for the World Grand Champions Cup.
- Asian Men's Championship in Manila, Philippines:
  - Semifinals:
    - **Iran** 3–2 South Korea
    - **Japan** 3–2 China
  - Classification 5th–8th:
    - **Kazakhstan** 3–2 Australia
    - **Indonesia** 3–2 Chinese Taipei
- South American Women's Championship in Porto Alegre, Brazil:
  - Bronze medal match: Colombia 1–3 (bronze) **Peru**
  - Final: (gold) **Brazil** 3–0 (silver) Argentina
    - Brazil win the title for the eighth straight time and 16th overall, and qualify for the World Grand Champions Cup.
- African Men's Championship in Tétouan, Morocco:
  - Seventh place match: Botswana 2–3 South Africa
  - Fifth place match: Libya 1–3 Tunisia
  - Bronze medal match: (bronze) **Cameroon** 3–1 Morocco
  - Final: (silver) Algeria 0–3 (gold) **Egypt**
    - Egypt win the title for the third successive time and fifth overall, and qualify for the World Grand Champions Cup.
- Women's African Championship in Batna, Algeria:
  - Cameroon 1–3 Tunisia
  - Morocco 0–3 Botswana
  - Algeria 3–0 Senegal

=== October 3, 2009 (Saturday) ===
==== American football ====
- NCAA:
  - AP Top 10 (unbeaten teams in **bold**):
    - (3) **Alabama** 38, Kentucky 20
    - (4) **LSU** 20, (18) Georgia 13
    - (5) **Boise State** 34, UC Davis 16
    - (6) Virginia Tech 34, Duke 26
    - (7) USC 30, (24) California 3
    - (17) Miami (FL) 21, (8) Oklahoma 20
    - (9) Ohio State 33, Indiana 14
    - Victory Bell: (10) **Cincinnati** 37, Miami (OH) 13
    - Idle: (1) **Florida**, (2) **Texas**
  - Other games:
    - UTEP 58, (12) Houston 41
    - Paul Bunyan Trophy: Michigan State 26, (22) Michigan 20 (OT)
  - Other remaining unbeaten teams (rankings in parentheses):
    - (11) TCU, (13) Iowa, (18) Kansas (idle), Auburn, Missouri (idle), South Florida, Wisconsin

==== Auto racing ====
- Nationwide Series:
  - Kansas Lottery 300 in Kansas City, Kansas:
    - (1) Joey Logano (Connecticut) (Toyota, Joe Gibbs Racing) (2) Kyle Busch (Nevada) (Toyota, Joe Gibbs Racing) (3) Brad Keselowski (Michigan) (Chevrolet, JR Motorsports)

==== Baseball ====
- Major League Baseball (teams in **bold** have clinched division title, teams in italics have clinched a wild card berth):
  - American League:
    - Minnesota Twins 5, Kansas City Royals 4
    - Chicago White Sox 5, Detroit Tigers 1
      - The Twins move into a tie with the Tigers for the Central Division title with one game remaining.
  - National League:
    - Milwaukee Brewers 5, **St. Louis Cardinals** 4
    - Florida Marlins 4, **Philadelphia Phillies** 3
    - **Los Angeles Dodgers** 5, Colorado Rockies 0
      - The National League's postseason matchups are decided. The Dodgers secure the West Division title and the NL's best record with their win, and have home advantage in the NLCS if they get there. The Cards' loss gives the Phillies the #2 seed in the NL playoffs. The Division Series will pit the Dodgers against the Cardinals and the Phils against the Rockies.
  - Other news:
    - Two teams, one in each league, fire their general managers. The Toronto Blue Jays fire J. P. Ricciardi after eight seasons, and the San Diego Padres ax Kevin Towers, who had been the longest-tenured GM in the majors at 14 seasons. (Ricciardi – AP via ESPN) (Towers – ESPN)

==== Cricket ====
- ICC Champions Trophy in South Africa:
  - 2nd Semi-final at Johannesburg:
    - Pakistan 233/9 (50 ov), New Zealand 234/5 (47.5 ov). **New Zealand win by 5 wickets.**
      - The Black Caps advance to the final against Australia on October 5.

==== Fencing ====
- World Championships in Antalya, Turkey:
  - Men's Foil: (gold) Andrea Baldini (ITA) (silver) Zhu Jun (CHN) (bronze) Peter Joppich (GER) & Artem Sedov (RUS)
  - Women's Sabre: (gold) Mariel Zagunis (USA) (silver) Olga Kharlan (UKR) (bronze) Carole Vergne (FRA) & Orsolya Nagy (HUN)

==== Football (soccer) ====
- U-20 World Cup in Egypt: (teams in **bold** advance to the round of 16)
  - Group E:
    - **Costa Rica** 2–3 **Czech Republic**
    - Australia 1–3 **Brazil**
      - Final standings: Brazil, Czech Republic 7 points, Costa Rica 3, Australia 0.
      - Costa Rica advance as one of the best four 3rd place teams, and eliminate the United States.
  - Group F:
    - **Hungary** 2–0 **United Arab Emirates**
    - **South Africa** 2–0 Honduras
      - Final standings: Hungary 6 points, United Arab Emirates, South Africa 4, Honduras 3.
- CAF Confederation Cup Semifinals, first leg:
  - Bayelsa United (Nigeria) 1–1 (Algeria) ES Sétif
  - ENPPI (Egypt) 2–2 (Mali) Stade Malien
- Women's Copa Libertadores in Santos and Guarujá, Brazil:
  - Group 1: Santos (Brazil) 3–1 (Peru) White Star

==== Rugby league ====
- Super League play-offs:
  - Qualifying Semi-final 2:
    - **St. Helens** 14–10 Wigan Warriors
      - The Saints advance to the Grand Final for the fourth successive time to play the Leeds Rhinos.

==== Snooker ====
- Grand Prix in Glasgow, Scotland, round 1: (seeding in parentheses)
  - John Higgins (SCO) (1) def. Mark Joyce (ENG) 5–1
  - Mark Davis (ENG) def. Marco Fu (HKG) (8) 5–4
  - Ken Doherty (IRL) def. Mark Selby (ENG) (7) 5–3
  - Joe Perry (ENG) (12) def. Marcus Campbell (SCO) 5–2

==== Tennis ====
- WTA Tour:
  - Toray Pan Pacific Open in Tokyo, Japan:
    - Final: Maria Sharapova (RUS) def. Jelena Janković (SRB) 5–2, Ret.
      - Sharapova wins her 20th career title and her first since April 2008.

==== Volleyball ====
- European Women's Championship in Poland:
  - Semifinals:
    - **Netherlands** 3–1 Poland
    - **Italy** 3–1 Germany
- Asian Men's Championship in Manila, Philippines: (teams in **bold** advance to the semifinals)
  - Pool E:
    - Chinese Taipei 1–3 **China**
    - Kazakhstan 1–3 **Iran**
      - Final standings: Iran 6 points, China 5, Kazakhstan 4, Chinese Taipei 3.
  - Pool F:
    - Indonesia 3–2 Australia
    - **Japan** 3–0 **South Korea**
      - Final standings: Japan 6 points, South Korea 5, Indonesia 4, Australia 3.
- South American Women's Championship in Porto Alegre, Brazil:
  - Semifinals:
    - **Brazil** 3–0 Colombia
    - Peru 1–3 **Argentina**
  - Fifth place match: **Uruguay** 3–2 Venezuela
  - Seventh place match: Paraguay 0–3 **Chile**
- African Men's Championship in Tétouan, Morocco:
  - Semifinals:
    - Cameroon 2–3 **Algeria**
    - **Egypt** 3–0 Morocco
  - Classification 5th–8th:
    - **Libya** 3–2 Botswana
    - **Tunisia** 3–0 South Africa
- Women's African Championship in Batna, Algeria:
  - Senegal 3–1 Botswana
  - Tunisia 3–0 Morocco
  - Algeria 3–1 Cameroon

=== October 2, 2009 (Friday) ===
==== Baseball ====
- Major League Baseball (teams in **bold** have clinched division title, teams in italics have clinched at least a wild card berth):
  - American League:
    - Chicago White Sox 8, Detroit Tigers 0
    - Minnesota Twins 10, Kansas City Royals 7
      - The Twins pull to within 1 game of the Tigers in the Central Division race, with 2 games left.
  - National League:
    - Colorado Rockies 4, Los Angeles Dodgers 3
      - The Rockies stay alive in the West Division race, but still must beat the Dodgers in both of their remaining games to win the title.
    - Florida Marlins 7, **Philadelphia Phillies** 2
    - Milwaukee Brewers 12, **St. Louis Cardinals** 6
      - The Cards are now out of the race for the NL's best record, but remain in the hunt for home advantage in the Division Series, 1 game behind the Phils.

==== Basketball ====
- Euroleague:
  - First preliminary round, game 2: (first leg score in parentheses)
    - **Orléans** (France) 81–56 (53–55) (Belgium) Charleroi. Orléans win 134–111 on aggregate.
    - **Benetton Treviso** (Italy) 88–76 (73–78) (Latvia) Ventspils. Benetton Treviso win 161–154 on aggregate.
    - **ALBA Berlin** (Germany) 77–62 (60–61) (France) Le Mans. ALBA Berlin win 137–123 on aggregate.
    - **Maroussi** (Greece) 89–60 (67–69) (Greece) Aris Salonica. Maroussi win 156–129 on aggregate.

==== Cricket ====
- ICC Champions Trophy in South Africa:
  - 1st Semi-final at Centurion:
    - England 257 (47.4 ov); Australia 258/1 (41.5 ov, Shane Watson 136*, Ricky Ponting 111*). **Australia win by 9 wickets**.
      - Australia will play either New Zealand or Pakistan in the final on October 5.

==== Football (soccer) ====
- U-20 World Cup in Egypt: (teams in **bold** advance to the round of 16)
  - Group C:
    - **Germany** 3–0 Cameroon
    - **South Korea** 3–0 United States
      - Final standings: Germany 7 points, South Korea 4, United States, Cameroon 3.
  - Group D:
    - **Uruguay** 2–2 **Ghana**
    - Uzbekistan 1–1 England
      - Final standings: Ghana, Uruguay 7 points, Uzbekistan, England 1.
      - As a result of the score in Uzbekistan–England match, Nigeria advance as one of four best 3rd place teams.

==== Olympic Games ====
- Rio de Janeiro is elected as the host city of 2016 Summer Olympics by the IOC session in Copenhagen, and becomes the first ever city in South America to stage the Olympic Games. Rio de Janeiro beat Madrid by 66 votes to 32 in the third round of voting, after Chicago and Tokyo were eliminated in earlier rounds.

==== Rugby league ====
- Super League play-offs:
  - Qualifying Semi-final 1:
    - **Leeds Rhinos** 27–20 Catalans Dragons
      - 2-times defending champions Leeds Rhinos advance to the Grand Final for the third straight year.

==== Volleyball ====
- Asian Men's Championship in Manila, Philippines: (teams in **bold** advance to the semifinals)
  - Pool E:
    - Kazakhstan 0–3 China
    - Iran 3–1 Chinese Taipei
      - Standings: Iran 4 points, China, Kazakhstan 3, Chinese Taipei 2.
  - Pool F:
    - **Japan** 3–0 Australia
    - **South Korea** 3–0 Indonesia
      - Standings: Japan, South Korea 4 points, Australia, Indonesia 2.
- South American Women's Championship in Porto Alegre, Brazil: (teams in **bold** advance to the semifinals)
  - Pool A:
    - Uruguay 3–1 Paraguay
    - **Brazil** 3–0 **Argentina**
      - Final standings: Brazil 6 points, Argentina 5, Uruguay 4, Paraguay 3.
  - Pool B:
    - **Colombia** 3–0 Chile
    - **Peru** 3–0 Venezuela
      - Final standings: Peru 6 points, Colombia 5, Venezuela 4, Chile 3.

=== October 1, 2009 (Thursday) ===
==== Baseball ====
- Major League Baseball (teams in **bold** have clinched division title, teams in italics have clinched at least a wild card berth):
  - American League:
    - Minnesota Twins 8, Detroit Tigers 3
      - The Twins stay alive in the Central Division race, while the Tigers' magic number remains at 2.
  - National League:
    - Colorado Rockies 9, Milwaukee Brewers 2
      - The Rockies clinch at least a wild card berth and draw within 2 games of the idle Los Angeles Dodgers in the West Division.
    - Houston Astros 5, **Philadelphia Phillies** 3
    - **St. Louis Cardinals** 13, Cincinnati Reds 0
      - Starting pitcher Chris Carpenter hits a grand slam and drives in six runs in addition to picking up the win. The Cards are now 2 games behind the Dodgers and 1 game behind the Phillies in the race for the League's best record.

==== Basketball ====
- WNBA Finals:
  - Game 2 at Phoenix: (E1) Indiana Fever 93, (W1) Phoenix Mercury 84. **Best-of-5 series tied 1–1.**

==== Football (soccer) ====
- U-20 World Cup in Egypt: (teams in **bold** advance to the round of 16)
  - Group A:
    - Trinidad and Tobago 0–0 **Paraguay**
    - **Italy** 2–4 **Egypt**
      - Final standings: Egypt 6 points, Paraguay 5, Italy 4, Trinidad and Tobago 1.
  - Group B:
    - **Venezuela** 0–3 **Spain**
    - Tahiti 0–5 Nigeria
      - Standings: Spain 9 points, Venezuela 6, Nigeria 3, Tahiti 0.
      - Tahiti concede 21 goals in their 3 matches.
- UEFA Europa League group stage, Matchday 2:
  - Group A:
    - Anderlecht (Belgium) 1–1 (Netherlands) Ajax
    - Timişoara (Romania) 0–3 (Croatia) Dinamo Zagreb
  - Group B:
    - Slavia Prague (Czech Republic) 1–5 (France) Lille
    - Valencia (Spain) 3–2 (Italy) Genoa
  - Group C:
    - Hamburg (Germany) 4–2 (Israel) Hapoel Tel Aviv
    - Celtic (Scotland) 1–1 (Austria) Rapid Wien
  - Group D:
    - Sporting CP (Portugal) 1–0 (Germany) Hertha BSC
    - Ventspils (Latvia) 0–0 (Netherlands) Heerenveen
  - Group E:
    - Roma (Italy) 2–0 (Bulgaria) CSKA Sofia
    - Fulham (England) 1–0 (Switzerland) Basel
  - Group F:
    - Dinamo București (Romania) 0–1 (Greece) Panathinaikos
    - Galatasaray (Turkey) 1–1 (Austria) Sturm Graz
  - Group G:
    - Levski Sofia (Bulgaria) 0–4 (Italy) Lazio
    - Red Bull Salzburg (Austria) 2–0 (Spain) Villarreal
  - Group H:
    - Twente (Netherlands) 0–0 (Romania) Steaua București
    - Sheriff Tiraspol (Moldova) 0–1 (Turkey) Fenerbahçe
  - Group I:
    - AEK Athens (Greece) 1–0 (Portugal) Benfica
    - BATE Borisov (Belarus) 1–2 (England) Everton
  - Group J:
    - Toulouse (France) 2–2 (Belgium) Club Brugge
    - Shakhtar Donetsk (Ukraine) 4–1 (Serbia) Partizan
  - Group K:
    - Copenhagen (Denmark) 1–0 (Czech Republic) Sparta Prague
    - PSV Eindhoven (Netherlands) 1–0 (Romania) CFR Cluj
  - Group L:
    - Werder Bremen (Germany) 3–1 (Spain) Athletic Bilbao
    - Austria Wien 1–1 (Portugal) Nacional
- Copa Sudamericana Round of 16, second leg: (first leg score in parentheses)
  - Goiás (Brazil) 3–1 (0–2) (Paraguay) **Cerro Porteño**. 3–3 on aggregate, Cerro Porteño advance on away goals.
  - Lanús (Argentina) 1–1 (0–4) (Ecuador) **LDU Quito**. LDU Quito win 5–1 on aggregate.
  - Unión Española (Chile) 2–2 (2–3) (Argentina) **Vélez Sarsfield**. Vélez Sarsfield win 5–4 on aggregate.
  - **Fluminense** (Brazil) 4–1 (2–2) (Peru) Alianza Atlético. Fluminense win 6–3 on aggregate.
- CONCACAF Champions League Group Stage, round 5: (teams in **bold** advance to the quarterfinals)
  - Group B:
    - Marathón (Honduras) 2–0 (Mexico) Toluca
      - Standings: Toluca 12 points, D.C. United, Marathón 9, San Juan Jabloteh 0.

==== Ice hockey ====
- National Hockey League season opening games:
  - Washington Capitals 4, Boston Bruins 1
    - Two-time defending Hart Trophy winner Alex Ovechkin starts the season with two goals and an assist.
  - Montreal Canadiens 4, Toronto Maple Leafs 3 (OT)
  - Calgary Flames 5, Vancouver Canucks 3
  - Colorado Avalanche 5, San Jose Sharks 2
    - The Avs retire the number of Joe Sakic before the game and cruise to an easy win.

==== Snooker ====
- Premier League Snooker – League phase in Colchester, Essex:
  - Marco Fu (HKG) 2–4 Judd Trump (ENG)
  - Ronnie O'Sullivan (ENG) 3–3 Neil Robertson (AUS)
    - Standings: Judd Trump 4 points; John Higgins, Ronnie O'Sullivan, Neil Robertson 3; Stephen Hendry 2; Marco Fu 1; Shaun Murphy 0.

==== Volleyball ====
- European Women's Championship in Poland: (teams in **bold** advance to the semifinals)
  - Pool E in Łódź:
    - Spain 3–2 Belgium
    - **Netherlands** 3–2 Russia
    - **Poland** 3–1 Bulgaria
      - Final standings: Netherlands 10 points, Poland 9, Russia 8, Bulgaria 7, Spain 6, Belgium 5.
  - Pool F in Katowice:
    - **Italy** 3–0 Serbia
    - **Germany** 3–0 Azerbaijan
    - Turkey 3–0 Czech Republic
      - Final standings: Italy 10 points, Germany 9, Turkey 8, Serbia 7, Czech Republic 6, Azerbaijan 5.
- Asian Men's Championship in Manila, Philippines: (teams in **bold** advance to the second round)
  - Pool A:
    - **Kazakhstan** 3–1 Myanmar
    - Philippines 1–3 **Chinese Taipei**
      - Final standings: Kazakhstan 6 points, Chinese Taipei 5, Myanmar 4, Philippines 3.
  - Pool B:
    - **Indonesia** 0–3 **Japan**
      - Final standings: Japan 6 points, Indonesia 5, India 4, Thailand 3.
  - Pool C:
    - Vietnam 3–0 Sri Lanka
    - Hong Kong 0–3 **Iran**
      - Final standings: Iran 8 points, **China** 7, Vietnam 6, Sri Lanka 5, Hong Kong 4.
  - Pool D:
    - Lebanon 0–3 **South Korea**
    - Maldives 1–3 Qatar
      - Final standings: South Korea 8 points, **Australia** 7, Lebanon 6, Qatar 5, Maldives 4.
- South American Women's Championship in Porto Alegre, Brazil: (teams in **bold** advance to the semifinals)
  - Pool A:
    - **Argentina** 3–0 Paraguay
    - **Brazil** 3–0 Uruguay
      - Standings: Brazil, Argentina 4 points, Uruguay, Paraguay 2.
  - Pool B:
    - Venezuela 3–0 Chile
    - Peru 3–1 Colombia
      - Standings: Peru 4 points, Venezuela, Colombia 3, Chile 2.
- African Men's Championship in Tétouan, Morocco: (teams in **bold** advance to the semifinals)
  - Group A:
    - Libya 3–2 Morocco
      - Final standings: **Cameroon**, Morocco, Libya 5 points, South Africa 3.
  - Group B:
    - Botswana 3–0 Gabon
    - Tunisia 0–3 **Algeria**
      - Final standings: **Egypt** 8 points, Algeria 7, Tunisia 6, Botswana 5, Gabon 4.
