= 2009 St Helens R.F.C. season =

← 2008	2010 →

St. Helens entered their 137th year in 2009, and were in contention for of rugby league's Super League and Carnegie Challenge Cup competitions.

== 2009 season ==
=== Super League XIV ===
==== Round 1 ====
Saints came back from a 14-nil deficit early in the second half to beat Warrington Wolves 26-14.

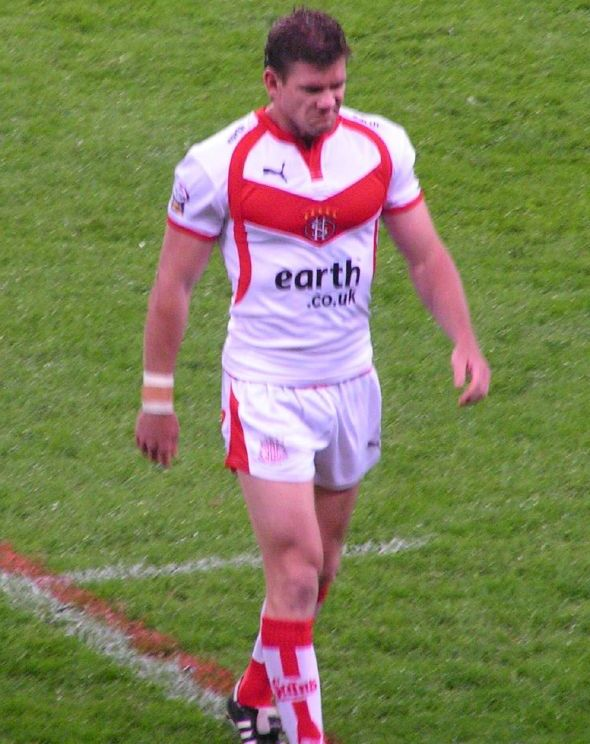
Matt Gidley scored twice against Warrington.

==== Round 2 ====
Saints turned over the much improved from last season Huddersfield Giants 23-6.

==== Round 3 ====
Hull Kingston Rovers inflicted Saints' first defeat of the season, with Michael Dobson scoring a late penalty goal to give the Robins a 20-19 win.

==== Round 4 ====
Saints scraped past newly promoted Crusaders in the lowest scoring game in the Super League; Tom Armstrong scoring the only try in a 4-nil win.

==== Round 5 ====
Saints brushed aside the Salford City Reds by 38 points to 12.

==== Round 6 ====
Saints edged a heated epic with Leeds Rhinos - winning 26-18 at Knowsley Road.

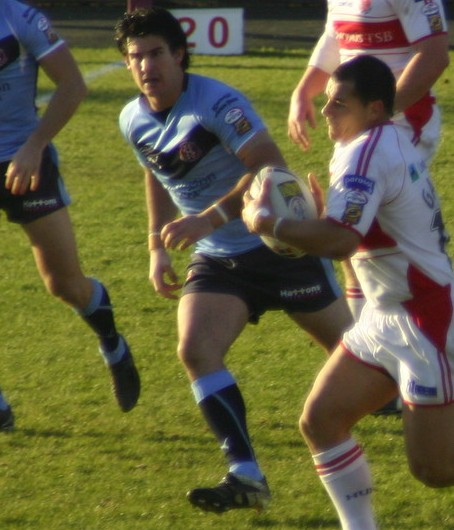
Chris Flannery was man-of-the-match against Leeds.

==== Round 7 ====
Saints hammered Wakefield Trinity Wildcats by 42-18. The Wildcats are in mourning for reserve player Leon Walker, who died in a reserve game.

==== Round 8 ====
Saints scraped past a fired up Wigan Warriors outfit, winning 19-12 after being 6-nil and 12-6 down.

==== Round 9 ====
Saints bounced Hull F.C. in the second game of the Easter period by 44-22.

==== Round 10 ====
Saints became the first team in Super League XIV to surpass 60 points, winning 68-22 at Castleford. Tony Puletua scored 4 tries but the game is halted for 30 minutes as Joe Westerman suffered a serious head injury.

==== Round 11 ====
Saints suffered only their second defeat of the season as Bradford come back to win 34-30.

==== Round 12 ====
Saints produced arguably their worst display of the campaign, losing 38-18 to arch rivals Wigan at the Magic Weekend.

==== Round 13 ====
Saints defeated Catalans Dragons for the second time in a week, by coming back from 22-10 down to win 32-28 to move them back to the top of the table.

==== Round 14 ====
Saints survived a second-half rally from Harlequins RL to win 22-12.

==== Round 15 ====
Saints eased past the challenge of Hull FC, winning 30-6.

==== Round 16 ====
Saints thrashed Castleford for a second time this season in a 50 points to 10 success.

==== Round 17 ====
Saints set a new record of 16 consecutive away wins in Super League after cantering to a 44-18 success over Bradford Bulls.

==== Round 18 ====
Saints shut out the Celtic Crusaders for a second time in the season - in a 30-0 win.

==== Round 19 ====
Saints lost their fourth game of the season in a shock 20-10 loss to Salford.

==== Round 20 ====
Saints beat neighbours Warrington for the second time in the league, in another fantastic game, this time by a margin of 40-26.

==== Round 21 ====
Despite outscoring their opponents Wakefield by 5 tries to four, Saints crash to their second defeat in three games, losing 22-20.

==== Round 22 ====
Saints bounce back from two defeats in three games with a convincing 44-24 win at Harlequins to take them back to two points clear at the top of the table.

==== Round 23 ====
Saints edge a third game of the season against Wigan, with Kyle Eastmond scoring a late try to secure a 10-6 victory.

==== Round 24 ====
Saints lost their third game in six as they crashed to a 26-10 loss at Hull KR.

==== Round 25 ====
Another below-par performance saw Saints scrape past a youthful Huddersfield outfit by 12 points to 10, after being 10 points down.

==== Round 26 ====
In a much improved performance, Saints were edged out by bitter rivals Leeds 18-10 in a third superb encounter of the season to all but end their hopes of a fifth consecutive League Leader's Shield.

==== Round 27 ====
Saints were beaten by Catalans in the last game of the regular season to finish second in the league ladder behind Leeds.

=== Challenge Cup 2009 ===
==== Round 4 ====
Saints edged past a second epic in two weeks against Leeds in a bruising encounter - pulling through 22-18.

==== Round 5 ====
Saints thrashe Catalans Dragons 42-8 to reach the Quarter Finals.

==== Quarter-Finals ====
Saints trounced a spirited Gateshead Thunder side 66-6 to advance to a record ninth consecutive Semi-Final.

==== Semi-Finals ====
Despite a Francis Meli hat-trick of tries, the holders Saints were beaten 24-14 by Huddersfield.

=== Play-Off Series ===
==== Week 1 ====
Saints beat Huddersfield in Week One to progress to the qualifying round in a 15-2 success.

==== Week 3 ====
Saints reached a fourth consecutive Super League Grand Final after beating Wigan in a thrilling 14-10 win. They will take on Leeds for a third consecutive time at Old Trafford.

==== Super League Grand Final ====
Saints lost the grand final to Leeds Rhinos 18-10, this being the third consecutive Grand Final they lose to Leeds.

=== Upcoming Fixture(s) ===
Saints will round off their Super League XIV campaign against Leeds Rhinos at the 2009 Super League Grand Final.

=== News ===
It has been announced that, for the 2010 Super League Season, Saints have signed New Zealand World Cup winning centre Iosia Soliola from the Sydney City Roosters on a three-year deal. Additionally, Scrum-half Sean Long will be leaving Knowsley Road after a 12-year stint. He is joining Hull F.C. on a two-year contract. Lee Gilmour is also on his way out of St Helens. The second-row has agreed a two-year deal with Huddersfield Giants for the 2010 season. Young half-back Matty Smith will join Salford City Reds for the 2010 season in a loan agreement. Prop-forward Jason Cayless will be leaving Saints too after 4 seasons with the club owing to a shoulder injury. He will return to Australia. Hull Kingston Rovers prop Nick Fozzard will re-join Saints after being released from the final year of his Rovers contract.

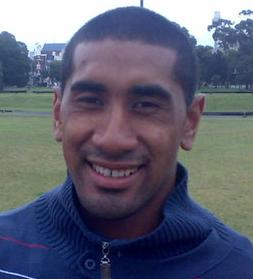
Iosia Soliola will be on board at the GPW next season.

=== Current squad ===
No.	Position	Player

== 2009 transfers ==
=== Acquisitions ===
Acquisitions
Player	Signed from	When Signed
Tony Puletua	Penrith Panthers	October 2008
Iosia Soliola	Sydney City Roosters (for 2010 season)	May 2009
Nick Fozzard	Hull Kingston Rovers (for 2010 season)	September 2009

=== Losses ===
Losses
Player	Signed for	When left
Paul Sculthorpe	Retired	October 2008
Mike Bennett	Retired	October 2008
Willie Talau	Salford City Reds	October 2008
Dean McGilvray	Salford City Reds	October 2008
Nick Fozzard	Hull Kingston Rovers	October 2008
Steve Tyrer	Crusaders (loan)	June 2009
Matty Smith	Crusaders (loan)	October 2008
Sam Thompson	Blackbrook ARLFC	Contract terminated and player returned to amateur football
Scott Moore	Huddersfield Giants (loan)	October 2008
Sean Long	Hull F.C. (for 2010 season)	June 2009
Lee Gilmour	Huddersfield Giants (for 2010 season)	July 2009

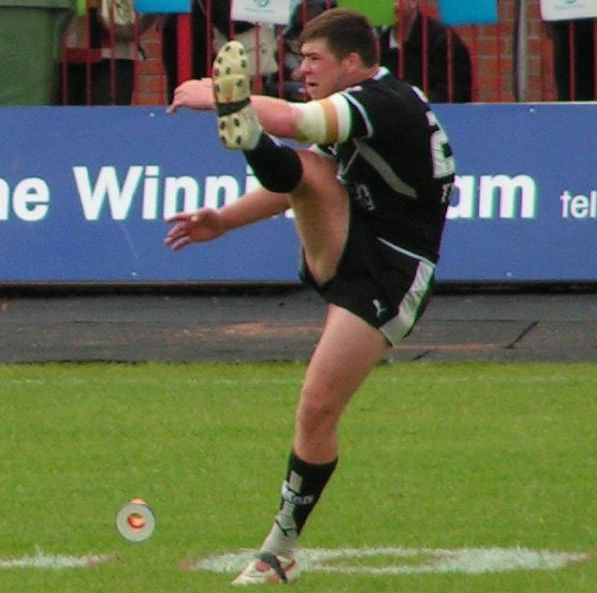
Steve Tyrer was loaned to Crusaders for the 2009 season.

== Fixtures and results ==
Competition	Round	Opponent	Result	Score	Home/away	Venue	Attendance	Date
Friendly	N/A	Widnes Vikings	Loss	26–28	Home	GPW Recruitment Stadium	4,128	27/12/2008
Friendly	N/A	Wakefield Trinity Wildcats	Win	26–22	Home	GPW Recruitment Stadium	3,549	18/01/2009
Friendly	N/A	Widnes Vikings	Win	54–6	Away	Stobart Stadium Halton	2,562	01/02/2009
Super League XIV	1	Warrington Wolves	Win	26-14	Home	GPW Recruitment Stadium	17,009	13/02/2009
Super League XIV	2	Huddersfield Giants	Win	6-23	Away	Galpharm Stadium	11,338	22/02/2009
Super League XIV	3	Hull Kingston Rovers	Loss	19-20	Home	GPW Recruitment Stadium	11,830	27/02/2009
Super League XIV	4	Crusaders	Win	0-4	Away	Brewery Field	6,351	07/03/2009
Super League XIV	5	Salford City Reds	Win	38-12	Home	GPW Recruitment Stadium	9,723	13/03/2009
Super League XIV	6	Leeds Rhinos	Win	26-18	Home	GPW Recruitment Stadium	13,966	20/03/2009
Super League XIV	7	Wakefield Trinity Wildcats	Win	18-42	Away	Belle Vue	6,038	29/03/2009
Challenge Cup 2009	4	Leeds Rhinos	Win	18-22	Away	Headingley Stadium	17,689	05/04/2009
Super League XIV	8	Wigan Warriors	Win	12-19	Away	JJB Stadium	22,232	09/04/2009
Super League XIV	9	Hull F.C.	Win	44-22	Home	GPW Recruitment Stadium	13,684	13/04/2009
Super League XIV	10	Castleford Tigers	Win	22-68	Away	The Jungle	8,003	19/04/2009
Super League XIV	11	Bradford Bulls	Loss	30-34	Home	GPW Recruitment Stadium	11,039	24/04/2009
Super League XIV	12	Wigan Warriors	Loss	38-18	Neutral	Murrayfield Stadium	29,687	02/05/2009
Challenge Cup 2009	5	Catalans Dragons	Win	42-8	Home	GPW Recruitment Stadium	7,176	10/05/2009
Super League XIV	13	Catalans Dragons	Win	28-32	Away	Stade Gilbert Brutus	9,065	16/05/2009
Super League XIV	14	Harlequins RL	Win	22-12	Home	GPW Recruitment Stadium	9,359	22/05/2009
Challenge Cup 2009	QF	Gateshead Thunder	Win	6-66	Away	Gateshead International Stadium	4,325	30/05/2009
Super League XIV	15	Hull FC	Win	6-30	Away	KC Stadium	12,009	05/06/2009
Super League XIV	16	Castleford Tigers	Win	50-10	Home	GPW Recruitment Stadium	9,680	12/06/2009
Super League XIV	17	Bradford Bulls	Win	18-44	Away	Grattan Stadium	10,599	21/06/2009
Super League XIV	18	Celtic Crusaders	Win	30-0	Home	GPW Recruitment Stadium	8,684	26/06/2009
Super League XIV	19	Salford City Reds	Loss	20-10	Away	The Willows	4,808	03/07/2009
Super League XIV	20	Warrington Wolves	Win	26-40	Away	Halliwell Jones Stadium	12,075	11/07/2009
Super League XIV	21	Wakefield Trinity Wildcats	Loss	20-22	Home	GPW Recruitment Stadium	8,651	17/07/2009
Super League XIV	22	Harlequins RL	Win	24-42	Away	Twickenham Stoop Stadium	4,258	25/07/2009
Super League XIV	23	Wigan Warriors	Win	10-6	Home	GPW Recruitment Stadium	15,563	31/07/2009
Challenge Cup 2009	SF	Huddersfield Giants	Loss	14-24	Neutral	Halliwell Jones Stadium	10,638	09/08/2009
Super League XIV	24	Hull Kingston Rovers	Loss	26-10	Away	New Craven Park	8,976	16/08/2009
Super League XIV	25	Huddersfield Giants	Win	12-10	Home	GPW Recruitment Stadium	8,708	21/08/2009
Super League XIV	26	Leeds Rhinos	Loss	18-10	Away	Headingley Carnegie	19,997	04/09/2009
Super League XIV	27	Catalans Dragons	Loss	12-24	Home	GPW Recruitment Stadium	8,268	11/09/2009
Super League XIV Play-offs	Qualifier	Huddersfield Giants	Win	15-2	Home	GPW Recruitment Stadium	6,157	19/09/2009
Super League XIV Play-offs	Semi-final	Wigan Warriors	Win	14-10	Home	GPW Recruitment Stadium	13,087	10/10/2009
Super League Grand Final	Final	Leeds Rhinos	Loss	18-10	Neutral	Old Trafford	63,259	17/10/2009

== League table ==
Pos	Team	Pld	W	D	L	PF	PA	PD	Pts	Qualification
1	Leeds Rhinos (L, C)	27	21	0	6	805	453	+352	42	Play-offs
2	St Helens	27	19	0	8	733	466	+267	38	Play-offs
3	Huddersfield Giants	27	18	0	9	690	416	+274	36	Play-offs
4	Hull Kingston Rovers	27	17	1	9	650	516	+134	35	Play-offs
5	Wakefield Trinity Wildcats	27	16	0	11	685	609	+76	32	Play-offs
6	Wigan Warriors	27	15	0	12	659	551	+108	30	Play-offs
7	Castleford Tigers	27	14	0	13	645	702	−57	28	Play-offs
8	Catalans Dragons	27	13	0	14	613	660	−47	26	Play-offs
9	Bradford Bulls	27	12	1	14	653	668	−15	25	
10	Warrington Wolves	27	12	0	15	649	705	−56	24	
11	Harlequins	27	11	0	16	591	691	−100	22	
12	Hull F.C.	27	10	0	17	502	623	−121	20	
13	Salford City Reds	27	7	0	20	456	754	−298	14	
14	Celtic Crusaders	27	3	0	24	357	874	−517	6	

Source: Rugby League Project
Rules for classification: 1) Points; 2) Points difference; 3) Number of points scored;
(C) Champions; (L) League Leaders' Shield Winners

== 2009 Squad ==
As of 29 July 2009:

Number	Nationality	Player name	Position	Weight (kg)	Height (m)	D.O.B.	Previous club
1	(England)	Paul Wellens (VC)	FB	96	1.85	27/02/80	St Helens Academy
2	(England)	Ade Gardner	W	94	1.88	26/06/83	Barrow Border Raiders
3	(Australia)	Matthew Gidley	C	94	1.86	01/07/77	Newcastle Knights
4			C				
5	(Samoa) (New Zealand) ^{1}	Francis Meli	W	100	1.88	27/04/79	New Zealand Warriors
6	(England) (Jamaica) ^{2}	Leon Pryce	SO	98	1.91	09/10/81	Bradford Bulls
7	(England)	Sean Long (VC)	SH	85	1.75	24/09/76	Widnes Vikings
8	(New Zealand)	Jason Cayless	PR	106	1.93	15/01/80	Sydney Roosters
9	(Wales)	Keiron Cunningham (C)	HK	102	1.75	28/10/76	St Helens Academy
10	(England)	James Graham	PR	106	1.88	10/09/85	St Helens Academy
11	(Scotland)	Lee Gilmour	SR	99	1.88	13/03/78	Bradford Bulls
12	(England)	Jon Wilkin	SR	97	1.85	01/11/83	Hull Kingston Rovers
13	(Australia)	Chris Flannery	LF	100	1.86	05/06/80	Sydney Roosters
14	(England)	James Roby	HK	87	1.78	22/11/85	St Helens Academy
15	(Wales)	Bryn Hargreaves	PR	103	1.83	14/11/85	Wigan Warriors
16	(Samoa) (New Zealand) ^{1}	Tony Puletua	SR	110	1.92	25/06/78	Penrith Panthers
17	(England)	Paul Clough	SR	98	1.83	27/09/87	St Helens Academy
18	(England)	Kyle Eastmond	SH	75	1.67	17/07/89	St Helens Academy
19	(England)	Chris Dean	C	86	1.80	17/01/88	St Helens Academy
20	(England)	Gareth Frodsham	PR	100	1.89	18/12/89	St Helens Academy
21	(England)	Gary Wheeler	SO	87	1.79	30/09/89	St Helens Academy
22	(England)	Sean Magenniss	SR	91	1.82	02/12/89	St Helens Academy
23	(England) (Samoa) ^{3}	Maurie Fa'asavalu	PR	105	1.91	12/01/80	Samoan Rugby Union
24	(England)	Andrew Dixon	LF	94	1.83	28/02/90	St Helens Academy
25	(England)	Jamie Foster	C	85	1.87	27/07/90	St Helens Academy
26	(England)	Andy Yates	PR	98	1.86	23/02/90	St Helens Academy
27	(England)	Jamie Ellis	SH	85	1.79	04/10/89	St Helens Academy
28	(England)	Matty Ashurst	SR	90	1.86	01/11/89	St Helens Academy
29	(England)	Tom Armstrong	W	92	1.90	12/09/89	St Helens Academy
30	(England)	Jonny Lomax	FB	82	1.77	04/09/90	St Helens Academy
31	(England)	Jacob Emmitt	PR	102	1.86	04/10/88	St Helens Academy
32	(England)	Paul Johnson	C	88	1.87	13/03/88	St Helens Academy

^{1 - Meli and Puletua won caps for New Zealand before switching to Samoa}

^{2 - Pryce is of Jamaican origin}

^{3 - Fa'asavalu switched his allegiance to England under the residency rule}
