= 2010 St Helens R.F.C. season =

- Super League XV Rank: 2nd
- Play-off result: Runners Up
- Challenge Cup: Semi-finals
- 2010 record: Wins: 23; draws: 0; losses: 8
- Points scored: For: 946; against: 547

Team information
- Chairman: Eamonn McManus
- Head coach: Mick Potter
- Captain: Keiron Cunningham
- Stadium: GPW Recruitment Stadium
- Avg. attendance: 13,273
- High attendance: 17,500 (Warrington Wolves, 19 March 2010) (Wigan Warriors, 4 April 2010)

Top scorers
- Tries: Francis Meli (21)
- Goals: Kyle Eastmond (63)
- Points: Kyle Eastmond (188)
Home colours
← 2009	List of seasons	2011 →

St. Helens entered their 136th year in rugby in 2010, their 115th in rugby league, and were in contention for the Super League, in its 15th Season, and the 109th Challenge Cup.

== League table ==
Pos	Team	Pld	W	D	L	PF	PA	PD	Pts	Qualification
1	Wigan Warriors (L, C)	27	22	0	5	922	411	+511	44	Play-offs
2	St Helens	27	20	0	7	946	547	+399	40	Play-offs
3	Warrington Wolves	27	20	0	7	885	488	+397	40	Play-offs
4	Leeds Rhinos	27	17	1	9	725	561	+164	35	Play-offs
5	Huddersfield Giants	27	16	1	10	758	439	+319	33	Play-offs
6	Hull F.C.	27	16	0	11	569	584	−15	32	Play-offs
7	Hull Kingston Rovers	27	14	1	12	653	632	+21	29	Play-offs
8	Celtic Crusaders	27	12	0	15	547	732	−185	24	Play-offs
9	Castleford Tigers	27	11	0	16	648	766	−118	22	
10	Bradford Bulls	27	9	1	17	528	728	−200	19	
11	Wakefield Trinity Wildcats	27	9	0	18	539	741	−202	18	
12	Salford City Reds	27	8	0	19	448	857	−409	16	
13	Harlequins	27	7	0	20	494	838	−344	14	
14	Catalans Dragons	27	6	0	21	409	747	−338	12	

Source: Rugby League Project
Rules for classification: 1) Points; 2) Points difference; 3) Number of points scored;
(C) Champions; (L) League Leaders' Shield Winners

== Colours ==
St Helens stuck with tradition in selecting their home kit for 2010, with a white and red "vee" jersey, similar to the one worn by stars like Alex Murphy and Tom van Vollenhoven in the 1960s. The away kit was a striking, new colour combination never before seen by the Knowsley Road faithful, a sharp blue jersey with a white "vee" and red trim within the "vee". St Helens also launched a commemorative heritage strip that celebrates St Helens' 110th and final season at Knowsley Road.

Home

Heritage

== Pre-season ==
St Helens offset the loss of Jason Cayless, Lee Gilmour and Sean Long with the signings of prop forward Nick Fozzard (returning to the club after a year at Hull Kingston Rovers), centre Iosia Soliola from Sydney Roosters and hooker Scott Moore returning from loan spells at Castleford Tigers in 2008 and Huddersfield Giants in 2009. The club also promoted youngsters Jack Bradbury, a centre, and stand-off Lee Gaskell. Matty Smith and Steve Tyrer are again let out on loan, this time both players leaving for Salford City Reds for the season, whilst Chris Dean was "dual-registered" with Widnes Vikings. St Helens saw no coaching change despite finishing trophy-less for the first time in 4 years and some fans calling for the sacking of head coach Mick Potter. The club's pre-season went well, defeating Widnes and Halifax convincingly before the Under 21s fell to a 44–0 loss to Keighley Cougars.

== 2010 results and fixtures ==
=== Friendlies ===
==== Sunday 27 December ====
St Helens vs. Wigan Warriors (off due to icy pitch)

==== Tuesday 19 January (Karalius Cup) ====
Widnes Vikings 26-42 St Helens

==== Friday 22 January (Mike Bennett Testimonial match) ====
St Helens 38-18 Halifax

==== Sunday 24 January ====
St Helens (Under 21s) 0-44 Keighley Cougars

=== Super League XV ===
==== Round 1 ====
St Helens vs Hull

Preview:
The game will see former talismanic scrum-half and captain Sean Long return to Knowsley Road with his new side Hull; ironically as captain. The St Helens squad sees Francis Meli absent as the big Kiwi and Samoa wing is in his native Samoa on compassionate grounds. His place is likely to be taken by Gary Wheeler or Jonny Lomax. Elsewhere, Saints are at full strength, with no place available for second-rows Matty Ashurst or Andy Dixon or prop Gareth Frodsham in the initial 19-man squad.

St Helens 12-32 Hull

St Helens' season got off to the worst possible start with a crushing loss to Hull at a foggy Knowsley Road. Despite a strong start, making good yardage and showing signs of the Saints flair of the Millward and Anderson eras, Saints failed to execute throughout and their defence proved leaky with Willie Manu cantering over in the 25th minute. Epalahame Lauaki barged over 12 minutes after brushing off Leon Pryce, following more shocking defence from the five-time champions, and Hull continued to press after half-time, with Sean Long returning to haunt his former employers in a man-of-the-match performance, and Tom Briscoe adding scores to make the game safe with a 26–0 scoreline. Saints hit back through quick-fire tires from Matt Gidley and Chris Flannery, but again, the finishing touch was found lacking in vital areas, meaning they could not pull off a comeback of old. Kirk Yeaman competed the win in the 75th minute after latching on to a Craig Fitzgibbon hack-on. No doubt, St Helens must improve on their basics should they want to trouble Leeds and usual pace-setters in the top four.

Saturday 6 February 2010

St. Helens
Tries: Matt Gidley 63'
Chris Flannery 69'

Goals: Kyle Eastmond (2/2)

12–32
(Report)

Hull F.C.
Tries: Willie Manu 25'
Epalahame Lauaki 37'
Sean Long 46'
Tom Briscoe 57'
Kirk Yeaman 75'

Goals: Danny Tickle (4/4)
Craig Fitzgibbon (2/2)

Knowsley Road, St Helens, Merseyside
Attendance: 12,142
Referee: Ben Thaler

==== Round 2 ====
Bradford Bulls vs St Helens

Preview:
The game sees St Helens' big winger Francis Meli return to the initial 19-man squad for the round 2 game at the Odsal Stadium. second-row Matty Ashurst also comes back into contention for Saints. They take the places of centre Iosia Soliola who is out for three to four weeks with an ankle problem and wing Ade Gardner who has and intercostal muscle injury and is out of contention for six to eight weeks. Talismanic hooker and skipper Keiron Cunningham was due to earn his 500th cap in the professional game but missed the fixture due to a family bereavement.

Bradford Bulls 6-38 St Helens

St Helens got back to winning ways after the week previous' crushing loss to Hull with a resounding win at Bradford. Saints started the game well, with Jon Wilkin opening the scoring in the 12th minute. From this St Helens kicked on, Kyle Eastmond kicking a penalty before full-back Paul Wellens scored two of his eventual four tries before the half-hour mark. Saints continued the pressure after the half-time break with Eastmond intercepting and going 80 metres in the 48th minute. Bradford applied the pressure for fifteen minutes, but a mixture of awesome defence and poor decision making from the Bulls meant Saints kept them at nil. Wellens added his third and fourth in the 65th and 71st minutes before Bradford responded through a Matt Orford try and goal; a scant consolation score in the final moments of the game. A mention must go to Leon Pryce who had a hand in no less than 3 of his sides tries against his former employers. St Helens look to be back to their destructive best, and this win may relieve the pressure on under-fire coach Mick Potter.

Sunday 14 February 2010

Bradford
Tries: Matt Orford 79'

Goals: Matt Orford (1/1)

6–38
(Report)

St. Helens
Tries: Jon Wilkin 12'
Paul Wellens 19', 28', 65', 71'
Kyle Eastmond 48'

Goals: Kyle Eastmond (7/7)

Odsal Stadium, Bradford, West Yorkshire
Attendance: 10,165
Referee: Phil Bentham

Catalans Dragons vs St Helens

Preview:
St Helens will be looking to build upon last week's first win of the season at Bradford. However, they do not boast a healthy record at the Stade Gilbert Brutus, winning only twice over four seasons. Andy Dixon earns a recall, whilst Jack Bradbury could make his St Helens début in the game after being named in his maiden 19-man squad. Chris Flannery misses out on the game through a shoulder injury, and he joins Iosia Soliola (ankle) and Ade Gardner (rib cartilage) on the injury list. Keiron Cunningham does not travel due to a family bereavement, as he still awaits his 500th game at professional level.

Catalans Dragons 12-42 St Helens

St Helens got back-to-back wins after a comfortable win over the Dragons in Perpignan. However, it was the Dragons who got the better of the opening exchanges, with Setaimata Sa and Chris Walker going over inside the first ten minutes. Neither scores were converted, but Catalans had an 8–0 lead. However, on the 15 minute mark, Saints found their cutting edge and began to tick, with young winger Jonny Lomax latching on to an inch-perfect Paul Wellens chip. Despite James Graham being off the field with suspected concussion and Jonny Lomax being caught by a dangerous tackle by Olivier Elima which resulted in the French captain's sending off, St Helens pressed on and it was Lomax, who shrugged off the shot from Elima to cut inside his opposing winger to score a brilliant try. Kyle Eastmond scored a goal from the touchline for a 10-8 St Helens lead, and with the extra man advantage, it was looking ominous for the Dragons. Francis Meli got his first of the season after a fine kick form the in-form Leon Pryce, and shortly after, Matt Gidley cut back inside his winger to finish a fine move for the first of his two tries of the evening. Half-time – 8–18 to Saints. The second-half continued in a similar guise, with Maurie Fa'asavalu scoring a trade-mark, barnstorming try under the posts. Eastmond was next to score, Gidley cutting through the defence and flicking the ball back on the inside to Eastmond who sped 30 meters for a fine try. Meli then crossed for his second, finishing well a break from Matty Ashurst. Gidley then got his brace, with a trademark, show and go on the outside to score. That was the end of the St Helens scoring, but by no means the end of the action, with Bryn Hargreaves and Scott Moore involved in a brawl with the Catalans forwards. Walker got his second with five minutes remaining, but the win was in the bag by the hour mark.

Saturday 20 February 2010

Catalans Dragons
Tries: Setaimata Sa 2'
Chris Walker 9', 75'

Goals: William Barthau (0/3)

12–42
(Report)

St. Helens
Tries: Jonny Lomax 15', 24'
Francis Meli 29', 51'
Matt Gidley 35', 59'
Maurie Fa'asavalu 44'
Kyle Eastmond 48'

Goals: Kyle Eastmond (5/8)

Stade Aimé Giral, Perpignan, Pyrénées-Orientales, France
Attendance: 7,825
Referee: Steve Ganson

==== Round 4 ====
St Helens vs Wakefield Trinity Wildcats

Preview:
The game will St Helens' talismanic skipper Keiron Cunningham return to the fold to make his 500th appearance in professional rugby, following the sudden death of his mother, Annie. However, winger Ade Gardner and centre Sia Soliola still miss out through rib and ankle injuries respectively. Also, second rowers Jon Wilkin and Chris Flannery will both miss the game with shoulder problems, therefore meaning Matty Ashurst will deputise for his first appearance of 2010.

St Helens 22-16 Wakefield Trinity Wildcats

St Helens made it three consecutive wins with a hard-fought if scrappy win over the in-form Wakefield. Despite a strong, assured start from the Drednaughts with tries from Daryl Millard and young Dale Morton inside the first ten minutes, St Helens finally got going and got onto the scoreboard on 27 minutes with Jonny Lomax notching his third in four games. They continued to apply the pressure in the second half with scores from Kyle Eastmond, Francis Meli and Keiron Cunningham scoring on this landmark game for the hooker. Wakefield applied pressure late on with Millard getting his second, but St Helens held on for the win.

==== Round 6 ====
St Helens 37 Crusaders 30

== 2010 transfers ==
=== Acquisitions ===
Acquisitions
Player	Signed from	When Signed
Scott Moore	Huddersfield Giants (return from loan spell)	October 2009
Iosia Soliola	Sydney Roosters	May 2009
Nick Fozzard	Hull Kingston Rovers	September 2009
Jack Bradbury	Promoted from reserves	November 2009
Lee Gaskell	Promoted from reserves	November 2009

Mid-season signings for 2011
Player	Signed from	When Signed
Josh Perry	Manly-Warringah Sea Eagles	June 2010
Michael Shenton	Castleford Tigers	August 2010
Louie McCarthy-Scarsbrook	Harlequins RL	September 2010

=== Losses ===
Losses
Player	Signed for	When left
Sean Long	Hull F.C.	February 2009
Lee Gilmour	Huddersfield Giants	August 2009
Steve Tyrer	Salford City Reds (loan)	November 2009
Matty Smith	Salford City Reds (loan)	November 2009
Jason Cayless	Wests Tigers	October 2009
Chris Dean	Widnes Vikings (dual registration)	December 2009
Jacob Emmitt	Leigh Centurions (dual registration)	February 2010

Mid-season losses for 2011
Player	Signed for	When left
Maurie Fa'asavalu	Harlequin F.C.	July 2010
Matty Smith	Salford City Reds	July 2010
Bryn Hargreaves	Bradford Bulls	September 2010
Steve Tyrer	Widnes Vikings	September 2010
Nick Fozzard	Castleford Tigers	September 2010
Jacob Emmitt	Castleford Tigers	September 2010

== 2010 squad ==
2010 St Helens RLFC season
First team squad			Coaching staff
1 Paul Wellens (vc) – FB; 2 Ade Gardner – WG; 3 Matt Gidley – CE; 4 Sia Soliola – CE, SR; 5 Francis Meli – WG; 6 Leon Pryce – SO, CE; 7 Kyle Eastmond – SH; 8 Nick Fozzard – PR; 9 Keiron Cunningham (c) – HK; 10 James Graham – PR; 11 Tony Puletua – SR, PR; 12 Jon Wilkin – SR; 13 Chris Flannery – LF	14 James Roby – HK; 15 Bryn Hargreaves – PR; 16 Scott Moore – HK; 17 Paul Clough – SR; 18 Matty Ashurst – SR; 19 Chris Dean – CE; 20 Gareth Frodsham – PR; 21 Gary Wheeler – SO, CE; 22 Andrew Dixon – LF; 23 Maurie Fa'asavalu – PR	24 Jonny Lomax – FB, SO, CE; 25 Jacob Emmitt – PR; 26 Tom Armstrong – WG; 27 Jamie Ellis – SH; 28 Shaun Magennis – SR; 29 Andy Yates – PR; 30 Jamie Foster – CE; 31 Jack Bradbury – CE; 32 Lee Gaskell – SO; 33 Paul Johnson – CE; 34 Matty Smith – SH, SO	Head coach: Michael Potter; Assistant coaches: Kieron Purtill; Matt Viljoen; Legend: (c) Captain(s); (vc) Vice-captain(s); Updated: 11 December 2009; Source(s): St Helens 1st team squad,
