= 2009 Super League season results =

Rugby league competition results

2009 Super League season results details the regular season and play-off match results of Super League XIV.

== Regular season ==
=== Round 1 ===
- The first full round of the season, two games (one each from rounds 3 and 17) having been played the weekend before.
- Bradford and Hull KR played out the first draw of the season at the Grattan Stadium.

Home	Score	Away	Match Information
Home	Score	Away	Date and Time	Venue	Referee	Attendance
Hull FC	18 – 10	Wigan Warriors	13 February, 20:00 GMT	KC Stadium	Phil Bentham	14,573
Leeds Rhinos	18 – 4	Wakefield Trinity Wildcats	13 February, 20:00 GMT	Headingley Carnegie Stadium	Steve Ganson	15,643
St. Helens	26 – 14	Warrington Wolves	13 February, 20:00 GMT	GPW Recruitment Stadium	Ian Smith	17,009
Catalans Dragons	8 – 30	Huddersfield Giants	14 February, 17:00 GMT	Stade Gilbert Brutus	Gareth Hewer	7,520
Salford City Reds	28 – 16	Crusaders	14 February, 19:30 GMT	The Willows	Thierry Alibert	4,026
Bradford Bulls	13 – 13	Hull Kingston Rovers	15 February, 15:00 GMT	Grattan Stadium	Ben Thaler	12,141
Castleford Tigers	8 – 12	Harlequins RL	15 February, 15:30 GMT	The Jungle	Jamie Leahy	7,049
Source: "Super League XIV 2009 - Round 1". Rugby League Project. Retrieved on 2009-05-23.

=== Round 2 ===
- The fixture between Harlequins and Bradford will be played at another time during the course of the season. It was originally scheduled to be played before Round 1 to accommodate a friendly with Manly-Warringah Sea Eagles on Round 2 weekend but was postponed because a frozen pitch at The Twickenham Stoop. The match was rearranged for 8 August, to coincide with the semifinal stage of the 2009 Challenge Cup, in which both sides were knocked-out in Round 4.
- Leeds maintained their 100% winning start to the season with a hard-fought victory over Hull KR.
- Wigan fell to Castleford in their third successive loss - their worst start to a season in 24 years, and their worst ever start in the Super League.

Home	Score	Away	Match Information
Home	Score	Away	Date and Time	Venue	Referee	Attendance
Hull Kingston Rovers	10 – 19	Leeds Rhinos	20 February, 20:00 GMT	Craven Park	Phil Bentham	8,623
Wigan Warriors	22 – 28	Castleford Tigers	20 February, 20:00 GMT	JJB Stadium	Steve Ganson	12,079
Celtic Crusaders	20 – 28	Hull FC	21 February, 18:00 GMT	Brewery Field	Jamie Leahy	5,272
Warrington Wolves	20 – 40	Catalans Dragons	21 February, 18:00 GMT	Halliwell Jones Stadium	Jason Robinson	7,947
Huddersfield Giants	6 – 23	St Helens RLFC	22 February, 15:00 GMT	Galpharm Stadium	Thierry Alibert	11,338
Wakefield Trinity Wildcats	29 – 10	Salford City Reds	22 February, 15:30 GMT	Belle Vue	Ian Smith	6,578
Harlequins RL	18 – 42	Bradford Bulls	8 August, 15:00 BST	Twickenham Stoop	Ian Smith	3,112
Source: "Super League XIV 2009 - Round 2". Rugby League Project. Retrieved on 2009-05-23.

=== Round 3 ===
- The Leeds vs Celtic fixture was the first fixture of the season, played before Round 1 in order to accommodate Leeds Rhinos' World Club Challenge fixture against Manly-Warringah Sea Eagles during the Round 3 weekend. Leeds started the defence of their Super League title with a victory over the Crusaders, who were making their Super League début.
- Hull KR became the first team to win a match by a single point in the 2009 season.
- Nineteen-year-old Shaun Ainscough picked up Wigan's Man of the Match award for his second match in-a-row.
- Castleford became the first team of the season to score 50 points or more .

Home	Score	Away	Match Information
Home	Score	Away	Date and Time	Venue	Referee	Attendance
Leeds Rhinos	28 – 6	Celtic Crusaders	6 February, 20:00 GMT	Headingley Carnegie Stadium	Ben Thaler	14,827
Bradford Bulls	12 – 16	Huddersfield Giants	27 February, 20:00 GMT	Grattan Stadium	Steve Ganson	10,186
Hull FC	28 – 12	Catalans Dragons	27 February, 20:00 GMT	KC Stadium	Ben Thaler	12,482
St Helens RLFC	19 – 20	Hull Kingston Rovers	27 February, 20:00 GMT	GPW Recruitment Stadium	Ian Smith	11,830
Wakefield Trinity Wildcats	48 – 22	Warrington Wolves	27 February, 20:00 GMT	Belle Vue	Phil Bentham	5,169
Harlequins RL	18 – 24	Wigan Warriors	28 February, 17:30 GMT	Twickenham Stoop	Thierry Alibert	3,883
Castleford Tigers	52 – 16	Salford City Reds	28 February, 18:00 GMT	The Jungle	Gareth Hewer	7,052
Source: "Super League XIV 2009 - Round 3". Rugby League Project. Retrieved on 2009-05-23.

=== Round 4 ===
- Celtic and St Helens take part in the lowest-scoring match in Super League history, and the first to be 0-0 at half-time.
- Hull FC and Leeds both continue their unbeaten start to the season, while Celtic and Warrington fail to register their first points, despite running St Helens and Leeds (respectively) close.
- Bradford hooker Wayne Godwin suffers a broken leg in the match against Wigan.

Home	Score	Away	Match Information
Home	Score	Away	Date and Time	Venue	Referee	Attendance
Huddersfield Giants	20 – 24	Hull FC	6 March, 20:00 GMT	Galpharm Stadium	Ian Smith	10,459
Salford City Reds	18 – 48	Harlequins RL	6 March, 20:00 GMT	The Willows	Jamie Leahy	3,367
Wigan Warriors	44 – 10	Bradford Bulls	7 March, 17:30 GMT	JJB Stadium	Ben Thaler	12,588
Catalans Dragons	22 – 24	Castleford Tigers	7 March, 18:00 GMT	Stade Gilbert Brutus	Richard Silverwood	8,150
Celtic Crusaders	0 – 4	St Helens RLFC	7 March, 18:00 GMT	Brewery Field	Phil Bentham	6,351
Hull Kingston Rovers	31 – 18	Wakefield Trinity Wildcats	8 March, 15:00 GMT	Craven Park	Thierry Alibert	9,038
Warrington Wolves	14 – 20	Leeds Rhinos	8 March, 15:00 GMT	Halliwell Jones Stadium	Steve Ganson	9,863
Source: "Super League XIV 2009 - Round 4". Rugby League Project. Retrieved on 2009-05-23.

=== Round 5 ===
- Hull FC and Leeds both extend their winning start to 5 wins from 5 games, while at the other end of the table, Celtic and Warrington both continue their losing streak, and have now lost all of their first 5 games of the season.

Home	Score	Away	Match Information
Home	Score	Away	Date and Time	Venue	Referee	Attendance
Leeds Rhinos	34 – 10	Wigan Warriors	13 March, 20:00 GMT	Headingley Carnegie Stadium	Ian Smith	17,677
St Helens RLFC	38 – 12	Salford City Reds	13 March, 20:00 GMT	GPW Recruitment Stadium	Richard Silverwood	9,723
Harlequins RL	60 – 8	Warrington Wolves	14 March, 15:00 GMT	Twickenham Stoop	Thierry Alibert	3,206
Castleford Tigers	24 – 26	Huddersfield Giants	14 March, 18:00 GMT	The Jungle	Steve Ganson	6,572
Hull Kingston Rovers	48 – 18	Celtic Crusaders	15 March, 15:00 GMT	Craven Park	Ben Thaler	8,046
Bradford Bulls	24 – 36	Hull FC	15 March, 15:00 GMT	Grattan Stadium	Phil Bentham	11,327
Wakefield Trinity Wildcats	30 – 10	Catalans Dragons	15 March, 15:30 GMT	Belle Vue	James Child	4,807
Source: "Super League XIV 2009 - Round 5". Rugby League Project. Retrieved on 2009-05-23.

=== Round 6 ===
- Hull FC and Leeds both lose, breaking the two remaining 100% season records.
- Warrington win their first game of the season.
- The Celtic vs Wakefield match was postponed 40 minutes before the scheduled kick-off due to "unforeseen circumstances". Later, it was announced that one of Wakefield's players, Leon Walker, had collapsed and died during their reserves match earlier in the day, and this was the reason for the postponement. The match was rearranged to coincide with the quarterfinal stage of the 2009 Challenge Cup, in which both sides had already been knocked-out.

Home	Score	Away	Match Information
Home	Score	Away	Date and Time	Venue	Referee	Attendance
Hull FC	18 – 19	Castleford Tigers	20 March, 20:00 GMT	KC Stadium	Thierry Alibert	14,028
St Helens RLFC	26 – 18	Leeds Rhinos	20 March, 20:00 GMT	GPW Recruitment Stadium	Phil Bentham	13,966
Salford City Reds	12 – 38	Wigan Warriors	20 March, 20:00 GMT	The Willows	Gareth Hewer	7,016
Catalans Dragons	24 – 30	Bradford Bulls	21 March, 17:00 GMT	Stade Gilbert Brutus	Ian Smith	7,620
Huddersfield Giants	46 – 6	Harlequins RL	22 March, 15:00 GMT	Galpharm Stadium	Ben Thaler	6,356
Warrington Wolves	24 – 12	Hull Kingston Rovers	22 March, 15:00 GMT	Halliwell Jones Stadium	Richard Silverwood	8,457
Celtic Crusaders	6 – 50	Wakefield Trinity Wildcats	30 May, 19:00 BST	Brewery Field	Ben Thaler	2,089
Source: "Super League XIV 2009 - Round 6". Rugby League Project. Retrieved on 2009-05-23.

=== Round 7 ===
- A minute's silence was held before each match this round in memory of Leon Walker.

Home	Score	Away	Match Information
Home	Score	Away	Date and Time	Venue	Referee	Attendance
Leeds Rhinos	42 – 14	Catalans Dragons	27 March, 20:00 GMT	Headingley Carnegie Stadium	Ben Thaler	13,425
Wakefield Trinity Wildcats	18 – 42	St Helens RLFC	27 March, 20:00 GMT	Belle Vue	Thierry Alibert	6,038
Wigan Warriors	8 – 22	Huddersfield Giants	27 March, 20:00 GMT	JJB Stadium	Phil Bentham	11,670
Harlequins RL	22 – 12	Hull FC	28 March, 18:00 GMT	Twickenham Stoop	Richard Silverwood	3,593
Hull Kingston Rovers	48 – 12	Salford City Reds	29 March, 15:00 BST	Craven Park	Steve Ganson	8,104
Warrington Wolves	27 – 22	Celtic Crusaders	29 March, 15:00 BST	Halliwell Jones Stadium	Ian Smith	7,854
Castleford Tigers	28 – 26	Bradford Bulls	29 March, 15:30 BST	The Jungle	Gareth Hewer	9,185
Source: "Super League XIV 2009 - Round 7". Rugby League Project. Retrieved on 2009-05-23.

=== Round 8 ===
- This round saw the traditional Easter derbies, with Wigan taking on St Helens, Leeds travelling to Bradford, Castleford hosting Wakefield, and both Hull clubs meeting at the KC Stadium.
- Bradford win their first home game of the season, with Leeds being denied two tries from the video referee.

Home	Score	Away	Match Information
Home	Score	Away	Date and Time	Venue	Referee	Attendance
Wigan Warriors	12 – 19	St Helens RLFC	9 April, 20:00 BST	JJB Stadium	Ben Thaler	22,332
Harlequins RL	24 – 28	Catalans Dragons	9 April, 20:00 BST	Twickenham Stoop	Thierry Alibert	2,539
Hull FC	14 – 18	Hull Kingston Rovers	10 April, 13:00 BST	KC Stadium	Steve Ganson	22,337
Salford City Reds	18 – 16	Warrington Wolves	10 April, 15:00 BST	The Willows	Jamie Leahy	6,150
Huddersfield Giants	30 – 10	Celtic Crusaders	10 April, 19:30 BST	Galpharm Stadium	Richard Silverwood	6,407
Bradford Bulls	10 – 6	Leeds Rhinos	10 April, 20:00 BST	Grattan Stadium	Ian Smith	14,554
Castleford Tigers	6 – 35	Wakefield Trinity Wildcats	10 April, 20:00 BST	The Jungle	Phil Bentham	10,155
Source: "Super League XIV 2009 - Round 8". Rugby League Project. Retrieved on 2009-05-23.

=== Round 9 ===
- The Easter Monday fixtures.

Home	Score	Away	Match Information
Home	Score	Away	Date and Time	Venue	Referee	Attendance
Hull Kingston Rovers	8 – 30	Huddersfield Giants	13 April, 14:00 BST	Craven Park	Ben Thaler	8,731
Celtic Crusaders	18 – 40	Harlequins RL	13 April, 15:00 BST	Brewery Field	Ian Smith	3,009
Leeds Rhinos	20 – 30	Salford City Reds	13 April, 15:00 BST	Headingley Carnegie Stadium	James Child	14,381
St Helens RLFC	44 – 22	Hull FC	13 April, 15:00 BST	GPW Recruitment Stadium	Thierry Alibert	13,684
Warrington Wolves	6 – 28	Castleford Tigers	13 April, 15:00 BST	Halliwell Jones Stadium	Steve Ganson	8,202
Wakefield Trinity Wildcats	24 – 22	Bradford Bulls	13 April, 15:30 BST	Belle Vue	Richard Silverwood	6,516
Catalans Dragons	40 – 24	Wigan Warriors	13 April, 17:20 BST	Stade Gilbert Brutus	Phil Bentham	9,490
Source: "Super League XIV 2009 - Round 9". Rugby League Project. Retrieved on 2009-05-23.

=== Round 10 ===
- Chris Hicks claims a hat-trick and scores 30 points in a 22–58 defeat of Bradford at the Grattan Stadium.
- St Helens become the first team to score 60 points or more in a single game, against Castleford.
- Huddersfield's six-win run comes to an end against Super League champions, Leeds. On the other hand, Hull FC extend their losing run to six with a loss to Wakefield.

Home	Score	Away	Match Information
Home	Score	Away	Date and Time	Venue	Referee	Attendance
Bradford Bulls	22 – 58	Warrington Wolves	17 April, 20:00 BST	Grattan Stadium	Thierry Alibert	8,643
Hull FC	14 – 21	Wakefield Trinity Wildcats	17 April, 20:00 BST	KC Stadium	Gareth Hewer	11,975
Catalans Dragons	38 – 6	Salford City Reds	18 April, 17:30 BST	Stade Gilbert Brutus	Ben Thaler	8,327
Huddersfield Giants	6 – 34	Leeds Rhinos	18 April, 18:00 BST	Galpharm Stadium	Richard Silverwood	11,593
Harlequins RL	12 – 32	Hull Kingston Rovers	19 April, 15:00 BST	Twickenham Stoop	Phil Bentham	3,492
Wigan Warriors	44 – 10	Celtic Crusaders	19 April, 15:00 BST	JJB Stadium	Steve Ganson	12,371
Castleford Tigers	22 – 68	St Helens RLFC	19 April, 15:30 BST	The Jungle	Ian Smith	8,003
Source: "Super League XIV 2009 - Round 10". Rugby League Project. Retrieved on 2009-05-23.

=== Round 11 ===
- For the first time in over a year, since round 10 of Super League XIII, both St Helens and Leeds lose in the same round.
- The top four teams in the league before this round; St Helens, Leeds, Huddersfield and Wakefield, all lose their fixtures.
- Shaun Ainscough scores 4 tries against Wakefield, while Chris Hicks scores a hat-trick for the second successive weekend, this time against Huddersfield.

Home	Score	Away	Match Information
Home	Score	Away	Date and Time	Venue	Referee	Attendance
Leeds Rhinos	4 – 21	Harlequins RL	24 April, 20:00 BST	Headingley Carnegie Stadium	Steve Ganson	13,912
St Helens RLFC	30 – 34	Bradford Bulls	24 April, 20:00 BST	GPW Recruitment Stadium	Richard Silverwood	14,000
Salford City Reds	14 – 18	Hull FC	25 April, 18:00 BST	The Willows	Jamie Leahy	4,165
Celtic Crusaders	22 – 34	Castleford Tigers	26 April, 15:00 BST	Brewery Field	Thierry Alibert	2,857
Hull Kingston Rovers	44 – 10	Catalans Dragons	26 April, 15:00 BST	Craven Park	Ian Smith	8,115
Warrington Wolves	40 – 18	Huddersfield Giants	26 April, 15:00 BST	Halliwell Jones Stadium	Phil Bentham	8,007
Wakefield Trinity Wildcats	26 – 40	Wigan Warriors	26 April, 15:30 BST	Belle Vue	Ben Thaler	5,521
Source: "Super League XIV 2009 - Round 11". Rugby League Project. Retrieved on 2009-05-23.

=== Round 12 ===
- The Magic Weekend fixtures, held over the May Day bank holiday weekend at Murrayfield Stadium in Edinburgh.
- The event attracts an aggregate attendance of approximately 60,000 attendees over the two days. Over 6,000 of these were estimated to be Scottish.
- Paul Sykes scores a hat-trick to deliver Bradford their fourth win of the season.

Home	Score	Away	Match Information
Home	Score	Away	Date and Time	Venue	Referee	Attendance
Salford City Reds	16 – 24	Harlequins RL	2 May, 15:00 BST	Murrayfield Stadium	Gareth Hewer	29,627*
Wakefield Trinity Wildcats	16 – 32	Bradford Bulls	2 May, 17:00 BST	Murrayfield Stadium	Ian Smith	29,627*
Wigan Warriors	38 – 18	St Helens RLFC	2 May, 19:00 BST	Murrayfield Stadium	Steve Ganson	29,627*
Huddersfield Giants	40 – 16	Celtic Crusaders	3 May, 12:30 BST	Murrayfield Stadium	Ben Thaler	30,122*
Hull FC	24 – 16	Castleford Tigers	3 May, 14:45 BST	Murrayfield Stadium	Phil Bentham	30,122*
Catalans Dragons	16 – 36	Leeds Rhinos	3 May, 17:00 BST	Murrayfield Stadium	Thierry Alibert	30,122*
Warrington Wolves	28 – 36	Hull Kingston Rovers	3 May, 19:00 BST	Murrayfield Stadium	Richard Silverwood	30,122*
Source: "Super League XIV 2009 - Round 12". Rugby League Project. Retrieved on 2009-05-23.

* The attendances displayed are total aggregate attendances for each of the two days.

=== Round 13 ===
- Celtic win their first ever Super League match, ending an 11-match losing sequence.
- Following their win on the Friday night, Hull KR take top position in the league briefly, until St Helens regain top spot on Saturday evening.
- Leeds beat Castleford with the last kick of the match, a penalty conceded on 79:57 and converted after the hooter sounded.

Home	Score	Away	Match Information
Home	Score	Away	Date and Time	Venue	Referee	Attendance
Castleford Tigers	22 – 24	Leeds Rhinos	15 May, 20:00 BST	The Jungle	Ian Smith	8,082
Wigan Warriors	12 – 20	Hull Kingston Rovers	15 May, 20:00 BST	JJB Stadium	Richard Silverwood	13,415
Hull FC	16 – 18	Warrington Wolves	16 May, 18:00 BST	KC Stadium	Steve Ganson	10,997
Catalans Dragons	28 – 32	St Helens RLFC	16 May, 18:15 BST	Stade Gilbert Brutus	Phil Bentham	9,065
Huddersfield Giants	4 – 24	Salford City Reds	17 May, 15:00 BST	Galpharm Stadium	Thierry Alibert	6,903
Harlequins RL	24 – 17	Wakefield Trinity Wildcats	17 May, 15:00 BST	Twickenham Stoop	Ben Thaler	3,612
Bradford Bulls	24 – 30	Celtic Crusaders	17 May, 15:00 BST	Grattan Stadium	James Child	7,602

=== Round 14 ===
- Hull KR record their sixth win in a row, after a home victory to Castleford, who have failed to win a game during regular time in four matches.
- Bradford lose to both of Super League XIV's newly promoted sides, Celtic and Salford respectively, in successive weeks.
- Wigan's defeat at Warrington means they have never won at the Halliwell Jones Stadium in a professional match to date since the stadium's opening in 2004.
- In the first ever Super League match not to feature an English side, Celtic's hapless form at home continues with a defeat to Catalans, bringing their Brewery Field 2009 record to five defeats out of five.
- David Hodgson claims a hat-trick and Huddersfield score ten tries as Wakefield lose five matches in a row, this being their worst defeat since Round 24 of Super League X in terms of defeat margin.
- Keith Senior scores twice in his 300th match for Leeds, who comfortably beat Hull FC at Headingley.

Home	Score	Away	Match Information
Home	Score	Away	Date and Time	Venue	Referee	Attendance
Hull Kingston Rovers	16 – 6	Castleford Tigers	22 May, 20:00 BST	Craven Park	Gareth Hewer	8,104
St Helens RLFC	22 – 12	Harlequins RL	22 May, 20:00 BST	GPW Recruitment Stadium	Steve Ganson	9,359
Salford City Reds	18 – 10	Bradford Bulls	22 May, 20:00 BST	The Willows	Phil Bentham	4,383
Warrington Wolves	16 – 8	Wigan Warriors	22 May, 20:00 BST	Halliwell Jones Stadium	Ben Thaler	10,718
Celtic Crusaders	18 – 30	Catalans Dragons	23 May, 18:00 BST	Brewery Field	Richard Silverwood	2,927
Wakefield Trinity Wildcats	6 – 54	Huddersfield Giants	24 May, 15:30 BST	Belle Vue	Phil Bentham	5,037
Leeds Rhinos	46 – 16	Hull FC	26 May, 20:00 BST	Headingley Carnegie Stadium	Thierry Alibert	15,929

=== Round 15 ===
- Catalans record only their second ever win against Leeds, thanks to a try awarded by the video referee after the full eighty minutes had elapsed.
- Warrington extend their winning streak to five after defeating Castleford.
- Wigan claim their second home win over Salford in as many weekends, following their victory in the Challenge Cup seven days earlier.
- Hull FC's home form continues to decline, after a defeat to St Helens means they have lost all of their last six matches at the KC Stadium.

Home	Score	Away	Match Information
Home	Score	Away	Date and Time	Venue	Referee	Attendance
Huddersfield Giants	22 – 6	Hull Kingston Rovers	5 June, 20:00 BST	Galpharm Stadium	Richard Silverwood	6,346
Wigan Warriors	34 – 18	Salford City Reds	5 June, 20:00 BST	The Willows	Ian Smith	11,550
Hull FC	6 – 30	St Helens RLFC	5 June, 20:00 BST	KC Stadium	Phil Bentham	12,009
Harlequins RL	26 – 6	Celtic Crusaders	6 June, 15:00 BST	Twickenham Stoop	Jamie Leahy	2,245
Catalans Dragons	32 – 30	Leeds Rhinos	6 June, 17:15 BST	Stade Gilbert Brutus	Steve Ganson	7,913
Castleford Tigers	18 – 34	Warrington Wolves	6 June, 17:45 BST	The Jungle	Ben Thaler	5,628
Bradford Bulls	36 – 22	Wakefield Trinity Wildcats	7 June, 15:00 BST	Grattan Stadium	Thierry Alibert	8,387

=== Round 16 ===
- A test match between France and England is played in Paris over this weekend. Players on international duty miss their respective club's matches. Due to the test, and because ten Catalans players were selected for France, the round's fixture between Catalans and Salford was rearranged for 7 August.
- Craig Stapleton is sent off for using foul and abusive language in Salford's match against Catalans.
- Castleford drop out of the play-off places on points difference after a heavy defeat to St Helens.
- The first Super League home win at Brewery Field comes with defeat of Wigan.
- For the fiftieth year in a row, Huddersfield fail to win at Headingley. Leeds leapfrog Hull KR for second place.

Home	Score	Away	Match Information
Home	Score	Away	Date and Time	Venue	Referee	Attendance
Hull Kingston Rovers	10 – 40	Harlequins RL	12 June, 20:00 BST	Craven Park	Phil Bentham	7,874
St Helens RLFC	50 – 10	Castleford Tigers	12 June, 20:00 BST	GPW Recruitment Stadium	Ian Smith	9,680
Wakefield Trinity Wildcats	37 – 22	Hull FC	13 June, 18:00 BST	Belle Vue	Ben Thaler	4,721
Celtic Crusaders	22 – 16	Wigan Warriors	13 June, 18:00 BST	Brewery Field	Steve Ganson	5,253
Warrington Wolves	10 – 21	Bradford Bulls	14 June, 15:00 BST	Halliwell Jones Stadium	Richard Silverwood	9,606
Leeds Rhinos	20 – 12	Huddersfield Giants	14 June, 15:00 BST	Headingley Carnegie Stadium	Thierry Alibert	14,934
Salford City Reds	16 – 18	Catalans Dragons	7 August, 20:00 BST	The Willows	Phil Bentham	3,475

=== Round 17 ===
"Perpignan has a population of a little over 100,000 but there are three million inhabitants in Barcelona which is a two hours drive at the moment and will become much closer when the high-speed link is completed."

— Christophe Levy, Catalans Dragons general manager
- Catalans' home match against the Warrington was rearranged to take place in Spain, at the Estadi Olímpic Lluís Companys, the venue for the 1992 Summer Olympics. The aim was to spread the sport of rugby league into Catalonia, in what the Catalans' general manager described as the club's "Magic Weekend". Over 15,000 advance tickets were sold.
- The Wigan vs Wakefield fixture was played before Round 1, due to maintenance work at the JJB Stadium during the month of June in anticipation of the upcoming Premier League season, in which Wigan Athletic F.C. play in sharing the same stadium. Both clubs had a week's break over this round's weekend as a result.

Home	Score	Away	Match Information
Home	Score	Away	Date and Time	Venue	Referee	Attendance
Wigan Warriors	6 – 12	Wakefield Trinity Wildcats	8 February, 15:00 GMT	JJB Stadium	Ian Smith	14,377
Huddersfield Giants	6 – 13	Castleford Tigers	19 June, 20:00 BST	Galpharm Stadium	Steve Ganson	6,010
Hull FC	14 – 12	Salford City Reds	19 June, 20:00 BST	KC Stadium	Phil Bentham	11,218
Celtic Crusaders	18 – 32	Hull Kingston Rovers	20 June, 18:00 BST	Brewery Field	James Child	3,015
Harlequins RL	14 – 48	Leeds Rhinos	20 June, 18:00 BST	Twickenham Stoop	Ian Smith	4,378
Catalans Dragons	12 – 24	Warrington Wolves	20 June, 18:00 BST	Estadi Olímpic Lluís Companys	Thierry Alibert	18,150
Bradford Bulls	18 – 44	St Helens RLFC	21 June, 15:00 BST	Grattan Stadium	Ben Thaler	10,599
Source: "Super League XIV 2009 - Round 17". Rugby League Project. Retrieved on 2009-05-23.

=== Round 18 ===
Home	Score	Away	Match Information
Home	Score	Away	Date and Time	Venue	Referee	Attendance
Leeds Rhinos	33 – 20	Bradford Bulls	26 June, 20:00 BST	Headingley Carnegie Stadium	Phil Bentham	17,824
St Helens RLFC	30 – 0	Celtic Crusaders	26 June, 20:00 BST	GPW Recruitment Stadium	Gareth Hewer	8,684
Salford City Reds	10 – 34	Huddersfield Giants	26 June, 20:00 BST	The Willows	Ben Thaler	3,721
Castleford Tigers	20 – 22	Catalans Dragons	27 June, 18:00 BST	The Jungle	Ian Smith	5,508
Warrington Wolves	24 – 12	Hull FC	28 June, 15:00 BST	Halliwell Jones Stadium	Steve Ganson	9,170
Wakefield Trinity Wildcats	20 – 18	Harlequins RL	28 June, 15:30 BST	Belle Vue	Richard Silverwood	5,079
Hull Kingston Rovers	28 – 36	Wigan Warriors	28 June, 18:15 BST	Craven Park	Thierry Alibert	9,007

=== Round 19 ===
- David Howell of Harlequins becomes the first player of the season to be sent off, in Quins' match against Wigan at the JJB.
- Keith Senior, who holds the record for most Super League appearances, plays and scores in his 500th professional match.
- Jean-Philippe Baile picks up a hat-trick for Catalans as Hull KR lose their third game in a row and consequently drop to fourth in the table.

Home	Score	Away	Match Information
Home	Score	Away	Date and Time	Venue	Referee	Attendance
Salford City Reds	20 – 10	St Helens RLFC	3 July, 20:00 BST	The Willows	James Child	4,808
Wigan Warriors	40 – 12	Harlequins RL	3 July, 20:00 BST	JJB Stadium	Steve Ganson	14,977
Hull FC	30 – 43	Leeds Rhinos	4 July, 17:00 BST	KC Stadium	Ian Smith	11,780
Celtic Crusaders	6 – 22	Warrington Wolves	4 July, 18:00 BST	Brewery Field	Thierry Alibert	3,231
Catalans Dragons	23 – 12	Hull Kingston Rovers	4 July, 20:00 BST	Stade Gilbert Brutus	Richard Silverwod	9,073
Bradford Bulls	38 – 40	Castleford Tigers	5 July, 15:00 BST	Grattan Stadium	Ben Thaler	8,971
Huddersfield Giants	30 – 14	Wakefield Trinity Wildcats	5 July, 15:00 BST	Galpharm Stadium	Phil Bentham	7,486

=== Round 20 ===
Home	Score	Away	Match Information
Home	Score	Away	Date and Time	Venue	Referee	Attendance
Wigan Warriors	24 – 22	Catalans Dragons	10 July, 20:00 BST	JJB Stadium	Ben Thaler	11,543
Wakefield Trinity Wildcats	30 – 32	Leeds Rhinos	10 July, 20:00 BST	Belle Vue	Steve Ganson	6,425
Harlequins RL	16 – 32	Huddersfield Giants	11 July, 15:00 BST	Twickenham Stoop	Thierry Alibert	3,916
Warrington Wolves	26 – 40	St Helens RLFC	11 July, 18:00 BST	Halliwell Jones Stadium	Richard Silverwood	12,075
Celtic Crusaders	25 – 12	Salford City Reds	11 July, 18:00 BST	Brewery Field	Phil Bentham	3,009
Hull Kingston Rovers	32 – 12	Bradford Bulls	12 July, 15:00 BST	Craven Park	Ian Smith	8,206
Castleford Tigers	40 – 18	Hull FC	12 July, 15:30 BST	The Jungle	Jamie Leahy	8,297

=== Round 21 ===
- With normal kicker Kyle Eastmond out due to mumps, Paul Wellens misses all six of his attempts at goal in a game St Helens lose.
- Leeds come from behind against Hull KR, to end the round level on points with league leaders St Helens.
- Hull FC bounce back from three straight defeats with a win against Celtic at home.
- Six Catalans players score tries as Harlequins suffer their fifth successive defeat.

Home	Score	Away	Match Information
Home	Score	Away	Date and Time	Venue	Referee	Attendance
Hull FC	22 – 6	Celtic Crusaders	17 July, 20:00 BST	KC Stadium	James Child	10,397
Leeds Rhinos	24 – 14	Hull Kingston Rovers	17 July, 20:00 BST	Headingley Carnegie Stadium	Ben Thaler	16,192
St Helens RLFC	20 – 22	Wakefield Trinity Wildcats	17 July, 20:00 BST	GPW Recruitment Stadium	Thierry Alibert	8,651
Salford City Reds	12 – 18	Castleford Tigers	17 July, 20:00 BST	The Willows	Gareth Hewer	3,487
Bradford Bulls	14 – 20	Wigan Warriors	19 July, 15:00 BST	Grattan Stadium	Richard Silverwood	9,487
Huddersfield Giants	28 – 10	Warrington Wolves	19 July, 15:00 BST	Galpharm Stadium	Ian Smith	7,107
Catalans Dragons	38 – 16	Harlequins RL	19 July, 17:30 BST	Stade Gilbert Brutus	Steve Ganson	8,324

=== Round 22 ===
- Harlequins drop out of the play-offs for the first time all season, and because of their defeat to St Helens, only five teams remain with a positive points difference.
- Steve Menzies of Bradford becomes the first Super League player to contract swine flu.
- In the last match at the JJB Stadium before its name change on 1 August over 20,000 attendees see Wigan defeat Leeds, the tenth such attendance in the stadium's Super League history.

Home	Score	Away	Match Information
Home	Score	Away	Date and Time	Venue	Referee	Attendance
Wigan Warriors	28 – 10	Leeds Rhinos	24 July, 20:00 BST	JJB Stadium	Phil Bentham	20,295
Harlequins RL	24 – 44	St Helens RLFC	25 July, 15:00 BST	Twickenham Stoop	James Child	4,258
Hull Kingston Rovers	24 – 18	Hull FC	25 July, 18:00 BST	Craven Park	Richard Silverwood	9,450
Celtic Crusaders	12 – 34	Bradford Bulls	25 July, 18:00 BST	Brewery Field	Thierry Alibert	3,089
Warrington Wolves	62 – 20	Salford City Reds	26 July, 15:00 BST	Halliwell Jones Stadium	Ben Thaler	8,906
Huddersfield Giants	36 – 12	Catalans Dragons	26 July, 15:00 BST	Galpharm Stadium	Phil Bentham	5,823
Wakefield Trinity Wildcats	12 – 20	Castleford Tigers	26 July, 15:00 BST	Belle Vue	Ian Smith	8,371

=== Round 23 ===
- For the sixth consecutive year, Wigan fail to win at Knowsley Road.
- Hull FC become the second team to be 'nilled' this season, as Celtic get 'nilled' for the third time.

Home	Score	Away	Match Information
Home	Score	Away	Date and Time	Venue	Referee	Attendance
St Helens RLFC	10 – 6	Wigan Warriors	31 July, 20:00 BST	GPW Recruitment Stadium	Ben Thaler	15,563
Salford City Reds	24 – 30	Wakefield Trinity Wildcats	31 July, 20:00 BST	The Willows	James Child	3,151
Hull FC	0 – 24	Huddersfield Giants	31 July, 20:00 BST	KC Stadium	Steve Ganson	11,191
Leeds Rhinos	24 – 22	Warrington Wolves	1 August, 18:30 BST	Headingley Carnegie Stadium	Ian Smith	13,386
Catalans Dragons	34 – 0	Celtic Crusaders	1 August, 20:00 BST	Stade Gilbert Brutus	Richard Silverwood	6,874
Castleford Tigers	28 – 46	Hull Kingston Rovers	2 August, 12:00 BST	The Jungle	Thierry Alibert	8,709
Bradford Bulls	14 – 22	Harlequins RL	2 August, 15:00 BST	Grattan Stadium	Phil Bentham	7,813

=== Round 24 ===
- Leeds become the first team to score 70 or more points in a match this season.
- Wigan beat Warrington in the first game since the JJB Stadium was renamed as the DW Stadium.
- Danny Brough is sent off for dissent, having already been sin-binned earlier in the match, during Wakefield's defeat of Celtic.

Home	Score	Away	Match Information
Home	Score	Away	Date and Time	Venue	Referee	Attendance
Leeds Rhinos	76 – 12	Castleford Tigers	14 August, 20:00 BST	Headingley Carnegie Stadium	Ben Thaler	16,931
Wigan Warriors	36 – 16	Warrington Wolves	14 August, 20:00 BST	DW Stadium	Richard Silverwood	13,452
Harlequins RL	22 – 26	Salford City Reds	15 August, 15:00 BST	Twickenham Stoop	Thierry Alibert	2,612
Catalans Dragons	18 – 6	Hull FC	15 August, 20:15 BST	Stade de la Méditerranée	Ian Smith	9,800
Hull Kingston Rovers	26 – 10	St Helens RLFC	16 August, 15:00 BST	Craven Park	Steve Ganson	8,976
Wakefield Trinity Wildcats	46 – 12	Celtic Crusaders	16 August, 15:30 BST	Belle Vue	James Child	7,893
Huddersfield Giants	18 – 28	Bradford Bulls	16 August, 19:00 BST	Galpharm Stadium	Phil Bentham	7,982

=== Round 25 ===
Home	Score	Away	Match Information
Home	Score	Away	Date and Time	Venue	Referee	Attendance
Hull FC	26 – 6	Harlequins RL	21 August, 20:00 BST	KC Stadium	Phil Bentham	15,592
St Helens RLFC	12 – 10	Huddersfield Giants	21 August, 20:00 BST	GPW Recruitment Stadium	Ian Smith	8,708
Salford City Reds	10 – 14	Hull Kingston Rovers	21 August, 20:00 BST	The Willows	Jamie Leahy	4,224
Warrington Wolves	28 – 40	Wakefield Trinity Wildcats	21 August, 20:00 BST	Halliwell Jones Stadium	Ben Thaler	8,681
Celtic Crusaders	0 – 68	Leeds Rhinos	22 August, 18:00 BST	Brewery Field	Thierry Alibert	5,597
Bradford Bulls	42 – 18	Catalans Dragons	23 August, 15:00 BST	Grattan Stadium	Richard Silverwood	7,919
Castleford Tigers	26 – 29	Wigan Warriors	23 August, 19:00 BST	The Jungle	Steve Ganson	6,574

=== Round 26 ===
- In an ill-tempered affair, Leeds pull ahead of St Helens on points at the top of the table with only one round of the regular season remaining.
- Wigan's win over Hull FC guarantees them a home tie in the first weekend of the play-offs (as they are now sure to finish 5th or 6th in the table), while Hull FC now have no chance of making the play-offs.
- Clint Newton scores a hat-trick in a win that maintains Hull KR's 3rd spot, and leaves Warrington struggling to qualify for the play-offs.
- Like Wigan, Wakefield's win guarantees them 5th or 6th spot, and a home tie in the first round of the play-offs.
- Huddersfield keep up the pressure on Hull KR with a win over Celtic.
- After a sub-standard season, Bradford keep their play-off hopes alive with a win over Salford.
- Castleford guarantee themselves a place in the play-offs, at the expense of Harlequins, who now look unlikely to qualify.

Home	Score	Away	Match Information
Home	Score	Away	Date and Time	Venue	Referee	Attendance
Leeds Rhinos	18 – 10	St Helens RLFC	4 September, 20:00 BST	Headingley Carnegie Stadium	Phil Bentham	19,997
Wigan Warriors	34 – 22	Hull FC	4 September, 20:00 BST	DW Stadium	Ben Thaler	12,491
Hull Kingston Rovers	40 – 16	Warrington Wolves	5 September, 17:30 BST	Craven Park	Richard Silverwood	8,579
Catalans Dragons	20 – 34	Wakefield Trinity Wildcats	5 September, 17:45 BST	Stade Gilbert Brutus	Ian Smith	8,755
Celtic Crusaders	16 – 42	Huddersfield Giants	5 September, 18:00 BST	Brewery Field	Steve Ganson	1,988
Bradford Bulls	44 – 18	Salford City Reds	6 September, 15:00 BST	Grattan Stadium	James Child	8,167
Harlequins RL	0 – 48	Castleford Tigers	6 September, 15:00 BST	Twickenham Stoop	Thierry Alibert	3,824

=== Round 27 ===
- Leeds secure the League Leaders' Shield for the first time since 2004 with a close victory over Salford.
- Catalans secure a play-off position by beating St Helens.
- Despite winning their fifth game in a row, Bradford fail to make the play-offs.
- Huddersfield beat Wigan to secure 3rd place in the final table.
- Castleford's victory over Celtic guarantees them 7th place in the table.

Home	Score	Away	Match Information
Home	Score	Away	Date and Time	Venue	Referee	Attendance
Hull FC	18 – 21	Bradford Bulls	11 September, 20:00 BST	KC Stadium	Richard Silverwood	10,412
St Helens RLFC	12 – 24	Catalans Dragons	11 September, 20:00 BST	GPW Recruitment Stadium	Ben Thaler	8,268
Salford City Reds	24 – 30	Leeds Rhinos	11 September, 20:00 BST	The Willows	Thierry Alibert	6,101
Wakefield Trinity Wildcats	24 – 10	Hull Kingston Rovers	12 September, 18:00 BST	Belle Vue	Steve Ganson	6,328
Huddersfield Giants	48 – 16	Wigan Warriors	13 September, 15:00 BST	Galpharm Stadium	Ian Smith	8,988
Warrington Wolves	44 – 34	Harlequins RL	13 September, 15:00 BST	Halliwell Jones Stadium	Phil Bentham	10,387
Castleford Tigers	35 – 22	Celtic Crusaders	13 September, 15:30 BST	The Jungle	James Child	6,547

== Final table ==
Pos	Team	Pld	W	D	L	PF	PA	PD	Pts	Qualification
1	Leeds Rhinos (L, C)	27	21	0	6	805	453	+352	42	Play-offs
2	St Helens	27	19	0	8	733	466	+267	38	Play-offs
3	Huddersfield Giants	27	18	0	9	690	416	+274	36	Play-offs
4	Hull Kingston Rovers	27	17	1	9	650	516	+134	35	Play-offs
5	Wakefield Trinity Wildcats	27	16	0	11	685	609	+76	32	Play-offs
6	Wigan Warriors	27	15	0	12	659	551	+108	30	Play-offs
7	Castleford Tigers	27	14	0	13	645	702	−57	28	Play-offs
8	Catalans Dragons	27	13	0	14	613	660	−47	26	Play-offs
9	Bradford Bulls	27	12	1	14	653	668	−15	25	
10	Warrington Wolves	27	12	0	15	649	705	−56	24	
11	Harlequins	27	11	0	16	591	691	−100	22	
12	Hull F.C.	27	10	0	17	502	623	−121	20	
13	Salford City Reds	27	7	0	20	456	754	−298	14	
14	Celtic Crusaders	27	3	0	24	357	874	−517	6	

Source: Rugby League Project
Rules for classification: 1) Points; 2) Points difference; 3) Number of points scored;
(C) Champions; (L) League Leaders' Shield Winners

== Progression table ==
- Green cells indicate teams in play-off places at the end of the round. An underlined number indicates the team finished first in the table in that round.
- Note: Table is in round-by-round format, and does not necessarily follow chronological order. Rearranged fixtures are treated as though they were played on their respective rounds' weekends. Rearranged fixtures:
  - Harlequins RL vs Bradford Bulls, Round 2
  - Leeds Rhinos vs Celtic Crusaders, Round 3
  - Celtic Crusaders vs Wakefield Trinity Wildcats, Round 6
  - Wigan Warriors vs Wakefield Trinity Wildcats, Round 17

	Team	Round																										
	Team	1	2	3	4	5	6	7	8	9	10	11	12	13	14	15	16	17	18	19	20	21	22	23	24	25	26	27
1	St. Helens	2	4	4	6	8	10	12	14	16	18	18	18	20	22	24	26	28	30									
2	Leeds	2	4	6	8	10	10	12	12	12	14	14	16	18	20	20	22	24	26									
3	Hull Kingston Rovers	1	1	3	5	7	7	9	11	11	13	15	17	19	21	21	21	23	23									
4	Huddersfield	2	2	4	4	6	8	10	12	14	14	14	16	16	18	20	20	20	22									
5	Harlequins RL	2		2*	4*	6*	6*	8*	8*	10*	10*	12*	14*	16*	16*	18*	20*	20*	20*									
6	Wakefield Trinity	0	2	4	4	6	8	8	10	12	14	14	14	14	14	14	16	18	20									
7	Warrington	0	0	0	0	0	2	4	4	4	6	8	8	10	12	14	14	16	18									
8	Wigan	0	0	2	4	4	6	6	6	6	8	10	12	12	12	14	14	14	16									
9	Hull FC	2	4	6	8	10	10	10	10	10	10	12	14	14	14	14	14	16	16									
10	Castleford	0	2	4	6	6	8	10	10	12	12	14	14	14	14	14	14	16	16									
11	Catalans Dragons	0	2	2	2	2	2	2	4	6	8	8	8	8	10	12		12*	14*									
12	Bradford	1		1*	1*	1*	3*	3*	5*	5*	5*	7*	9*	9*	9*	11*	13*	13*	13*									
13	Salford	2	2	2	2	2	2	2	4	6	6	6	6	8	10	10		10*	10*									
14	Crusaders	0	0	0	0	0	0	0	0	0	0	0	0	2	2	2	4	4	4									

*: Indicates team has a game in-hand due to a postponed match

== Play-offs ==
The 2009 Super League play-offs took place in September and October 2009. They decided which two teams contested the Grand Final.

=== Format ===
Super League has used a play-off system since Super League III in 1998. When introduced, 5 teams qualified for the play-offs, which was subsequently expanded to 6 teams in 2002. For the first time, eight teams will compete in the play-offs in 2009.

Following the final round of matches, all eight play-off teams will be decided. The 2009 play-offs see the introduction of a system where the winning team from week one with the highest League placing will be allowed to select their opponents for week three. Except this choosing opportunity, the new format follows the play-off system of the Australian Football League.

Super League XIV play-offs bracket

Qualifying/Elimination playoffs
1	Leeds Rhinos	44
4	Hull Kingston Rovers	8
5	Wigan Warriors	18
8	Castleford Tigers	12
6	Wakefield Trinity Wildcats	16
7	Catalans Dragons	25
2	St. Helens	15
3	Huddersfield Giants	2

Preliminary semifinals
Hull Kingston Rovers	16
Wigan Warriors	30
Catalans Dragons	16
Huddersfield Giants	6

Qualifying semifinals
Leeds selected Catalans
Leeds Rhinos	27
Catalans Dragons	20
St. Helens	14
Wigan Warriors	10

Grand Final
10 October, Old Trafford
Leeds Rhinos	18
St. Helens	10

Week 1. Qualifying/Elimination play-offs: Fixtures decided by regular reason finishing positions. Higher ranked teams play lower ranked teams. Higher ranked teams receive home ground advantage.
Week 2. Preliminary semi-finals: Fixtures decided by regular season finishing positions. Higher ranked teams play lower ranked teams. Higher ranked teams receive home ground advantage.
Week 3. Qualifying semi-finals: Winners of Qualifying play-offs play winners of Qualifying semi-finals. Fixtures decided by club call. Winners of Qualifying play-offs receive home ground advantage.

=== Qualifying and Elimination Finals ===
Home	Score	Away	Match Information
Home	Score	Away	Date and Time	Venue	Referee	Attendance
Leeds Rhinos	44 – 8	Hull Kingston Rovers	18 September, 20:00 BST	Headingley Carnegie Stadium	Steve Ganson	11,220
St. Helens	15 – 2	Huddersfield Giants	19 September, 18:00 BST	GPW Recruitment Stadium	Richard Silverwood	6,157
Wakefield Trinity Wildcats	16 – 25	Catalans Dragons	19 September, 20:00 BST	Belle Vue	Phil Bentham	4,008
Wigan Warriors	18 – 12	Castleford Tigers	20 September, 19:00 BST	DW Stadium	Ian Smith	8,689
Eliminated: Wakefield, Castleford

- Chev Walker suffers a compound fracture of his leg as Leeds beat Hull KR, to progress to the Qualifying Semi-Finals.
- St Helens and Leeds progressed directly to week three.

=== Preliminary Semi-Finals ===
Home	Score	Away	Match Information
Home	Score	Away	Date and Time	Venue	Referee	Attendance
Huddersfield Giants	6 – 16	Catalans Dragons	25 September, 20:00 BST	Galpharm Stadium	S Ganson	4,263
Hull Kingston Rovers	10 – 30	Wigan Warriors	26 September, 17:30 BST	Craven Park	R Silverwood	8,162
Eliminated: Huddersfield, Hull KR

=== Semi-finals ===
Home	Score	Away	Match Information
Home	Score	Away	Date and Time	Venue	Referee	Attendance
Leeds Rhinos	27 – 20	Catalans Dragons	2 October, 20:00 BST	Headingley Carnegie Stadium	Richard Silverwood	13,409
St. Helens	14 – 10	Wigan Warriors	3 October, 17:30 BST	GPW Recruitment Stadium	Steve Ganson	13,087
Eliminated: Catalans, Wigan

- Under the rules of the Super League play-off system, Leeds were awarded a "club call", which allowed them to decide which of the winners from the Preliminary Semi-Finals they played.
- Leeds choose to play Catalans Dragons.

=== Grand final ===
Club 1	Score	Club 2	Match Information
Club 1	Score	Club 2	Date and Time	Venue	Referee	Attendance
Leeds Rhinos	18 – 10	St. Helens	10 October, 18:05 BST	Old Trafford, Manchester	Steve Ganson	63,259

- As winners of the 2009 Grand Final, Leeds contested the 2010 World Club Challenge against the Melbourne Storm, winners of the 2009 NRL Grand Final.

== See also ==
- Super League XIV
- Super League play-offs
