= Jack Bradbury (rugby league) =

English rugby league footballer

Personal information
- Full name: Jack Bradbury
- Born: 4 November 1990 (age 35) Oldham, England
- Height: 6 ft 0 in (183 cm)
- Weight: 14 st 7 lb (92 kg)

Playing information
- Position: Centre
Club
Years	Team	Pld	T	G	FG	P
2009–10	St. Helens	0	0	0	0	0
2011	Oldham RLFC	9	3	0	0	12
	Total	9	3	0	0	12
- Source: As of 7 July 2021

Jack Bradbury (born 4 November 1990 in Oldham, England) is an English professional rugby league footballer. Primarily a centre, he signed for the St Helens Academy team after playing youth and amateur football for the Saddleworth Rangers. He represented Lancashire Under-15's team and England Under-16's team during his youth years with the Saddleworth Rangers. In 2010, he left St Helens to join Oldham on a one-year deal. In February 2011, Bradbury scored two tries for Oldham in their 28-22 win over Hunslet in the Northern Rail Cup.
