= 2009 Super League season =

British rugby league season

Super League XIV
- League: Super League
- Duration: 27 Rounds
- Teams: 14
- Highest attendance: 22,337; Hull F.C. vs Hull Kingston Rovers (10 April)
- Lowest attendance: 1,988; Celtic Crusaders vs Huddersfield Giants (5 Sep)
- Total attendance: 1,799,413 ▲ (average 8,864)
- Broadcast partners: Sky Sports; Nine Network

2009 Season
- Champions: Leeds Rhinos; 4th Super League title 7th British title
- League Leaders: Leeds Rhinos
- Man of Steel: (Australia) Brett Hodgson
- Top point-scorer: (Republic of Ireland) Pat Richards (252)
- Top try-scorer: (England) Ryan Hall(29)

The Engage Super League XIV was the official name for the 2009 season of Super League. Fourteen teams competed over 27 rounds (including the Magic Weekend at Murrayfield Stadium) after which, the highest finishing teams entered the play-offs to compete for a place in the Grand Final and a chance to win the Super League Trophy. The previous Top six play-offs were extended to eight teams.

Salford City Reds and Crusaders join the twelve teams from Super League XIII, following the implementation of a licensing system. Additionally, it was the Crusaders' first ever Super League season. The Catalans Dragons played at least one game in Barcelona, Spain, to try to expand their fan base in Catalonia region.

The season officially kicked off on 6 February, with a Leeds Rhinos defeat of the Celtic Crusaders. It came to a conclusion with Leeds Rhinos beating St. Helens in the Super League Grand Final on 10 October.

== Teams ==
Super League XIV saw the introduction of a licensed Super League. Under this new system, promotion and relegation between Super League and National League One was abolished, and 14 teams were granted licences subject to certain criteria. All twelve teams from Super League XIII were given places, as well as former Super League team Salford City Reds and Crusaders, for whom it was their début season in top-flight European rugby league.

Geographically, the vast majority of teams in Super League are based in the north of England, four teams – Warrington, St. Helens, Salford and Wigan – to the west of the Pennines in Cheshire, Greater Manchester and Merseyside, and seven teams to the east in Yorkshire – Huddersfield, Bradford, Wakefield Trinity, Leeds, Castleford, Hull F.C. and Hull Kingston Rovers. Catalans Dragons are the only team outside of the United Kingdom, Crusaders are the only team in Wales, and Harlequins are the only team to be based in a capital city (London).

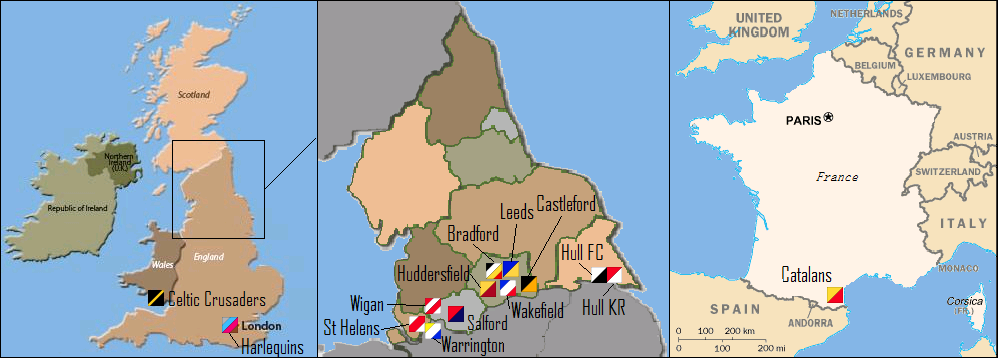
The locations of the teams that will contest Super League XIV.

Team	Stadium	Capacity	City/Area
Bradford Bulls (2009 season)	Grattan Stadium, Odsal	27,000	Bradford, West Yorkshire
Castleford Tigers (2009 season)	The Jungle	11,750	Castleford, West Yorkshire
Catalans Dragons (2009 season)	Stade Gilbert Brutus	10,000	Perpignan, Pyrénées-Orientales, France
Crusaders (2009 season)	Brewery Field	12,000	Bridgend, Glamorgan, Wales
Harlequins (2009 season)	Twickenham Stoop	12,700	Twickenham, London
Huddersfield Giants (2009 season)	Galpharm Stadium	24,544	Huddersfield, West Yorkshire
Hull F.C. (2009 season)	Kingston Communications Stadium	25,404	Kingston upon Hull, East Riding of Yorkshire
Hull Kingston Rovers (2009 season)	"New" Craven Park	9,471	Kingston upon Hull, East Riding of Yorkshire
Leeds Rhinos (2009 season)	Headingley Carnegie Stadium	22,250	Leeds, West Yorkshire
Salford City Reds (2009 season)	The Willows	11,363	Salford, Greater Manchester
St Helens R.F.C. (2009 season)	The GPW Recruitment Stadium	17,500	St Helens, Merseyside
Wakefield Trinity Wildcats (2009 season)	Belle Vue	12,600	Wakefield, West Yorkshire
Warrington Wolves (2009 season)	Halliwell Jones Stadium	14,206	Warrington, Cheshire
Wigan Warriors (2009 season)	DW Stadium	25,138	Wigan, Greater Manchester

Reigning champions	Promoted via licence

== Rule changes ==
Changes to the play-off system:

- This season an eight-team play-off system was introduced to replace the previous six-team system.
- One feature of this system, known as "Club Call", is that the highest ranked team from the regular season table winning a match in the first week of the play-offs will be able to select their opponents for their next game in Week Three. This selection opportunity is only possible for teams finishing in the top three during the regular season to achieve.

== Table ==
Pos	Team	Pld	W	D	L	PF	PA	PD	Pts	Qualification
1	Leeds Rhinos (L, C)	27	21	0	6	805	453	+352	42	Play-offs
2	St Helens	27	19	0	8	733	466	+267	38	Play-offs
3	Huddersfield Giants	27	18	0	9	690	416	+274	36	Play-offs
4	Hull Kingston Rovers	27	17	1	9	650	516	+134	35	Play-offs
5	Wakefield Trinity Wildcats	27	16	0	11	685	609	+76	32	Play-offs
6	Wigan Warriors	27	15	0	12	659	551	+108	30	Play-offs
7	Castleford Tigers	27	14	0	13	645	702	−57	28	Play-offs
8	Catalans Dragons	27	13	0	14	613	660	−47	26	Play-offs
9	Bradford Bulls	27	12	1	14	653	668	−15	25	
10	Warrington Wolves	27	12	0	15	649	705	−56	24	
11	Harlequins	27	11	0	16	591	691	−100	22	
12	Hull F.C.	27	10	0	17	502	623	−121	20	
13	Salford City Reds	27	7	0	20	456	754	−298	14	
14	Celtic Crusaders	27	3	0	24	357	874	−517	6	

Source: Rugby League Project
Rules for classification: 1) Points; 2) Points difference; 3) Number of points scored;
(C) Champions; (L) League Leaders' Shield Winners

== Play-offs ==
The play-offs commence following the conclusion of 27 round regular season and involve the eight sides finishing highest. The play-offs open on Friday 18 September, with the Week 1 fixtures being completed over the weekend.

A media conference is scheduled for Sunday 27 September following the conclusion of Week 2's preliminary semi-finals the day before. During the conference the highest ranked winning team from the qualifying play-offs in Week 1 will in announce which team they have chosen to play in Week 3, the next week.

The play-offs will conclude with the 2009 Super League Grand Final on 10 October.

Qualifying/Elimination playoffs
1	Leeds Rhinos	44
4	Hull Kingston Rovers	8
5	Wigan Warriors	18
8	Castleford Tigers	12
6	Wakefield Trinity Wildcats	16
7	Catalans Dragons	25
2	St. Helens	15
3	Huddersfield Giants	2

Preliminary semifinals
Hull Kingston Rovers	16
Wigan Warriors	30
Catalans Dragons	16
Huddersfield Giants	6

Qualifying semifinals
Leeds selected Catalans
Leeds Rhinos	27
Catalans Dragons	20
St. Helens	14
Wigan Warriors	10

Grand Final
10 October, Old Trafford
Leeds Rhinos	18
St. Helens	10

Week 1. Qualifying/Elimination play-offs: Fixtures decided by regular reason finishing positions. Higher ranked teams play lower ranked teams. Higher ranked teams receive home ground advantage.
Week 2. Preliminary semi-finals: Fixtures decided by regular season finishing positions. Higher ranked teams play lower ranked teams. Higher ranked teams receive home ground advantage.
Week 3. Qualifying semi-finals: Winners of Qualifying play-offs play winners of Qualifying semi-finals. Fixtures decided by club call. Winners of Qualifying play-offs receive home ground advantage.

== Club statistics ==
FLP	Team	PTS	TRS	GLS	DGLS	MET	CAR	TACK	OFFL	ATKI	RFDH	TACKB	MTAC	CBRE	FOTW	KIGP	MGLS	MITAC	ERR	PEN	RCAR	YCAR
1	Leeds	849	148	127	3	38007	5536	8111	386	273	874	846	1042	199	8	506	32	32	338	215	0	3
2	St Helens	748	142	88	4	40624	5800	8708	291	297	750	904	1088	182	6	504	56	56	371	169	0	1
3	Wigan	707	130	93	1	38164	5402	8595	397	299	823	850	1191	173	4	555	47	48	347	190	0	5
4	Wakefield	701	118	112	5	35625	5191	8038	244	393	931	724	1014	143	1	581	34	35	296	198	1	2
5	Huddersfield	698	121	107	0	37761	5428	9282	361	324	944	728	936	169	5	573	23	26	373	238	0	3
6	Hull KR	674	118	100	2	37954	5469	9063	198	332	793	703	1234	140	9	630	30	33	351	172	0	2
7	Catalans	658	120	88	2	36555	5175	8627	248	276	750	617	909	138	7	524	40	40	355	253	0	1
8	Castleford	657	117	93	3	36128	5457	7786	283	357	910	742	983	148	3	537	37	38	325	206	0	4
9	Bradford	653	111	103	3	35109	5299	7957	365	280	762	743	1019	148	3	460	32	32	360	201	0	3
10	Warrington	649	118	88	1	36355	5069	7855	325	280	706	752	1115	153	2	472	37	38	367	173	0	1
11	Harlequins	591	102	91	1	35590	5350	8618	294	315	808	679	1025	126	4	549	20	22	319	171	1	1
12	Hull	502	86	79	0	35322	5139	8137	359	336	772	738	972	119	4	556	22	24	302	140	0	1
13	Salford	460	80	70	0	30972	4849	8827	320	258	638	575	861	98	7	571	19	19	269	223	1	4
14	Celtic Crusaders	357	63	52	1	30222	5001	8397	311	249	747	511	962	94	0	554	16	17	340	204	0	3

Source: superleague.co.uk.

== Notable moments ==
- Friday 6 February - The season kicks off at Headingley, with the defending champions Leeds Rhinos taking on Super League newcomers Crusaders. Leeds eventually win the game 28–6.
- Sunday 15 February - The first draw of the season is played out at the Grattan Stadium, as Bradford Bulls and Hull Kingston Rovers draw 13-13.
- Friday 27 February - The first game in the season to be decided by a single point is won by Hull Kingston Rovers, who beat St. Helens 19 – 20 away from home.
- Saturday 7 March - St. Helens win 4–0 at Crusaders RL in the lowest scoring match in the Super League history.
- Friday 20 March - Hull FC and Leeds both lose, breaking the two remaining 100% records in the league.
- Sunday 22 March - Wakefield's match away at Celtic is postponed due to the death of Leon Walker in the corresponding reserves fixture earlier in the day.
- Sunday 19 April - St Helens become the first team to score 60 points or more in a single game, against Castleford.
- Friday 24-Sunday 26 April - The top four teams in the league before this round; St Helens, Leeds, Huddersfield and Wakefield, all lose their fixtures.
- Sunday 26 April - Chris Hicks scores a hat-trick for the second successive weekend, this time against Huddersfield.
- Saturday 2-Sunday 3 May - The Magic Weekend fixtures, held over the May Day bank holiday weekend at Murrayfield Stadium in Edinburgh attract an aggregate attendance of approximately 60,000 attendees over the two days. Over 6,000 of these were estimated to be Scottish.
- Sunday 17 May - Celtic beat Bradford to win their first ever Super League match, ending an 11-match losing sequence.
- Saturday 23 May - Celtic host Catalans in the first ever Super League match not to feature an English side.
- Saturday 20 June - Catalans Dragons host the first Super League game to take place in Spain, at the Estadi Olímpic Lluís Companys, the venue for the 1992 Summer Olympics.
- Friday 3 July - David Howell of Harlequins becomes the first player of the season to be sent off, in Quins' match against Wigan at the JJB.
- Saturday 4 July - Keith Senior, who holds the record for most Super League appearances, plays and scores in his 500th professional match.

== Awards ==
Awards were presented for outstanding contributions and efforts to players and clubs:

- Man of Steel: Brett Hodgson (Huddersfield Giants)
- Coach of the year: Nathan Brown (Huddersfield Giants)
- Engage Super League club of the year: Huddersfield Giants
- Young player of the year: Sam Tomkins (Wigan Warriors)
- Carnegie community player of the year: Lee Radford (Hull FC)
- Frontline Fairplay Index winners: Hull FC
- Metre-maker: James Graham (St Helens), 4,752 metres
- Hit Man: Malcolm Alker (Salford City Reds), 981 tackles
- Mike Gregory Spirit of Rugby League Award: Steve Prescott

== Disciplinary record ==
The following table lists all incidents that were reviewed by the Rugby Football League during Super League XIV, which were later deemed "guilty" and resulted in disciplinary action. The offenses were graded, depending on severity, in alphabetical order, "A" being less severe than "B".

Name of Player	Rnd	Offense	Grade	Suspension	Fine	Source
Chev Walker	1	Striking	C	1 match	£300	Report
Michael McIlorum	2	Dangerous throw	C	1 match	£200	Report
Jamal Fakir	2	High tackle	C	1 match	£300	Report
Ben Westwood	2	High tackle	D	5 matches	£300	Report
Maurie Fa'asavalu	4	"Chicken wing"	C	1 match	£300	Report
Keith Mason	7	Striking	C	None	£300	Report
Ian Sibbitt	10	High tackle	C	1 match	£300	Report
Darrell Griffin	17	Grapple tackle	C	None	£300	Report
Jamal Fakir	17	High tackle	C	2 matches	£300	Report

== Operational rules ==
Salary cap:

- For the 2009 season, Super League clubs agreed to operate within a £1.7 million salary cap for their 25 first tier players.

The 'club trained player rule' entered its second year and made a planned adjustment:

- Clubs would be required to include a minimum of six players, an increase from five players, who have come through their academy or are under 21 years old in their 25-player first team squads. Clubs were required to have eleven United Kingdom-trained players, an increase from ten, and no more than eight overseas-trained players, a decrease from ten.

== Media ==
=== Television ===
2009 was the first of a new three-year broadcasting agreement between the RFL and BSkyB for Sky Sports to screen matches exclusively live within the United Kingdom. The deal for the 2009, 2010 and 2011 season was worth in excess of £50 million, with media speculation that each Super League club would receive £0.9-£1.2 million in 2009.

Sky Sports' continued coverage in the UK sees two live matches broadcast each week - one on Friday Night at 7:30pm and another at 6pm on Saturdays. Regular commentators are Eddie Hemmings and Mike Stephenson with summarisers including Phil Clarke, Barrie McDermott and Terry O'Connor. Highlights are shown on Boots N' All which is shown on Sky Sports and is rebroadcast on the Internet.

BBC Sport broadcast a highlights programme called the Super League Show, usually presented by Harry Gration. The BBC have elected to broadcast this only to the North West, Yorkshire & North Midlands, North East & Cumbria, and East Yorkshire & Lincolnshire regions on a Sunday. A national repeat is broadcast overnight during the week, the BBC Director of Sport, Richard Moseley, commented that this move was in response to the growing popularity and awareness of the sport, and the large number of requests from people who want to watch it elsewhere in the UK. End of season play-offs are shown across the whole country in a highlights package. Super League Show is available for streaming or downloaded using the BBC iPlayer in the UK.

Orange Sport TV in France shows every Catalans Dragons home match live and also some other matches which are broadcast in the UK live on Sky.

Internationally Super League is shown live on Showtime Sports (Middle East), Sky Sport (New Zealand), NTV+ (Russia), SportKlub (Eastern Europe) and Setanta Sports (USA and Canada) show Super League matches live or delayed each week.

2009 was the first of a three-year deal in which the Nine Network in Australia will show up to 70 live games from Super League over the season.

=== Radio ===
Super League XIV is covered extensively by BBC Local Radio:

- BBC Radio Manchester cover Wigan, Salford and Warrington.
- BBC Radio Humberside cover Hull KR and Hull FC.
- BBC Radio Leeds cover Bradford, Leeds, Castleford, Wakefield and Huddersfield.
- BBC Radio Merseyside (AM/DAB only) cover St Helens and Warrington.

The competition is also covered on commercial radio coverage:

- BCB 106.6 (Bradford Community Broadcasting) cover Bradford Bulls home and away.
- Radio Aire cover Leeds Rhinos.
- KCFM Hull cover Hull KR and Hull.
- Radio Marseillette covers every Catalans Dragons Home Match (in French).
- Radio France Bleu Roussillon covers every Catalans Dragons Away Match (in French).
- Yorkshire Radio cover all Yorkshire clubs and have one commentary per round which is not covered by either BBC or SKY.

All Super League commentaries on any station are available via the particular stations on-line streaming.

=== Internet ===
ESPN360 has worldwide broadband rights.

Starting from Thursday 9 April 2009, all of the matches shown on Sky Sports will also be available live online via Livestation everywhere in the world excluding the US, Puerto Rico, UK, Ireland, France, Monaco, Australia and New Zealand. List of Super League games available on Livestation.com

In the United Kingdom, BBC London 94.9, BBC Radio Wales and Radio Warrington cover Harlequins, Celtic Crusaders (home games) and Warrington (home games) respectively.
