= Mike Bennett (rugby league) =

England international rugby league footballer

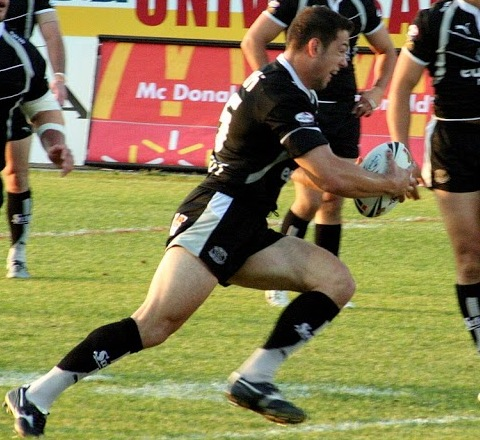

Personal information
- Full name: Michael Bennett
- Born: 9 May 1980 (age 45) Warrington, Cheshire, England

Playing information
- Height: 6 ft 1 in (1.85 m)
- Weight: 15 st 8 lb (99 kg)
- Position: Second-row
Club
| Years | Team | Pld | T | G | FG | P |
|---|---|---|---|---|---|---|
| 2000–08 | St Helens | 160 | 16 | 0 | 0 | 64 |
Representative
| Years | Team | Pld | T | G | FG | P |
| 2005 | England | 1 | 0 | 0 | 0 | 0 |

Mike Bennett is an English former professional rugby league footballer who played as a second-row forward for St Helens in the Super League.

== Playing career ==
Bennett played for St Helens as a second-row forward, scoring a try in their 2002 Super League Grand Final victory against the Bradford Bulls. St Helens reached the 2006 Super League Grand final to be contested against Hull FC, and Bennett played from the interchange bench in Saints' 26–4 victory. In 2005, Bennett represented England, coming off the bench in a 22–12 victory against France. As 2006 Super League champions, St. Helens faced 2006 NRL Premiers the Brisbane Broncos in the 2007 World Club Challenge. Bennett played as a second-row in the Saints' 18–14 victory.

Bennett announced on 1 September 2008 that he would retire at the end of the 2008 season due to injury.
