= Shaun Magennis =

English rugby league footballer

Personal information
- Full name: Shaun Magennis
- Born: 2 December 1989 (age 36) St Helens, Merseyside, England

Playing information
- Height: 6 ft 0 in (1.83 m)
- Weight: 15 st 13 lb (101 kg)
- Position: Second-row, Loose forward
Club
Years	Team	Pld	T	G	FG	P
2010–12	St. Helens	33	4	0	0	16

Shaun Magennis (born 2 December 1989) is an English former professional rugby league footballer who played in the 2010s for St. Helens as a second-row or Loose forward. Magennis signed for St Helens from local amateur club Blackbrook Royals.

== Background ==
Shaun Magennis was born in St Helens, Merseyside, England.

== Playing career ==
In 2012, Magennis was forced to retire due to injuries. He made 33 appearances for the club, scoring four tries.
