= 2009 Super League Grand Final =

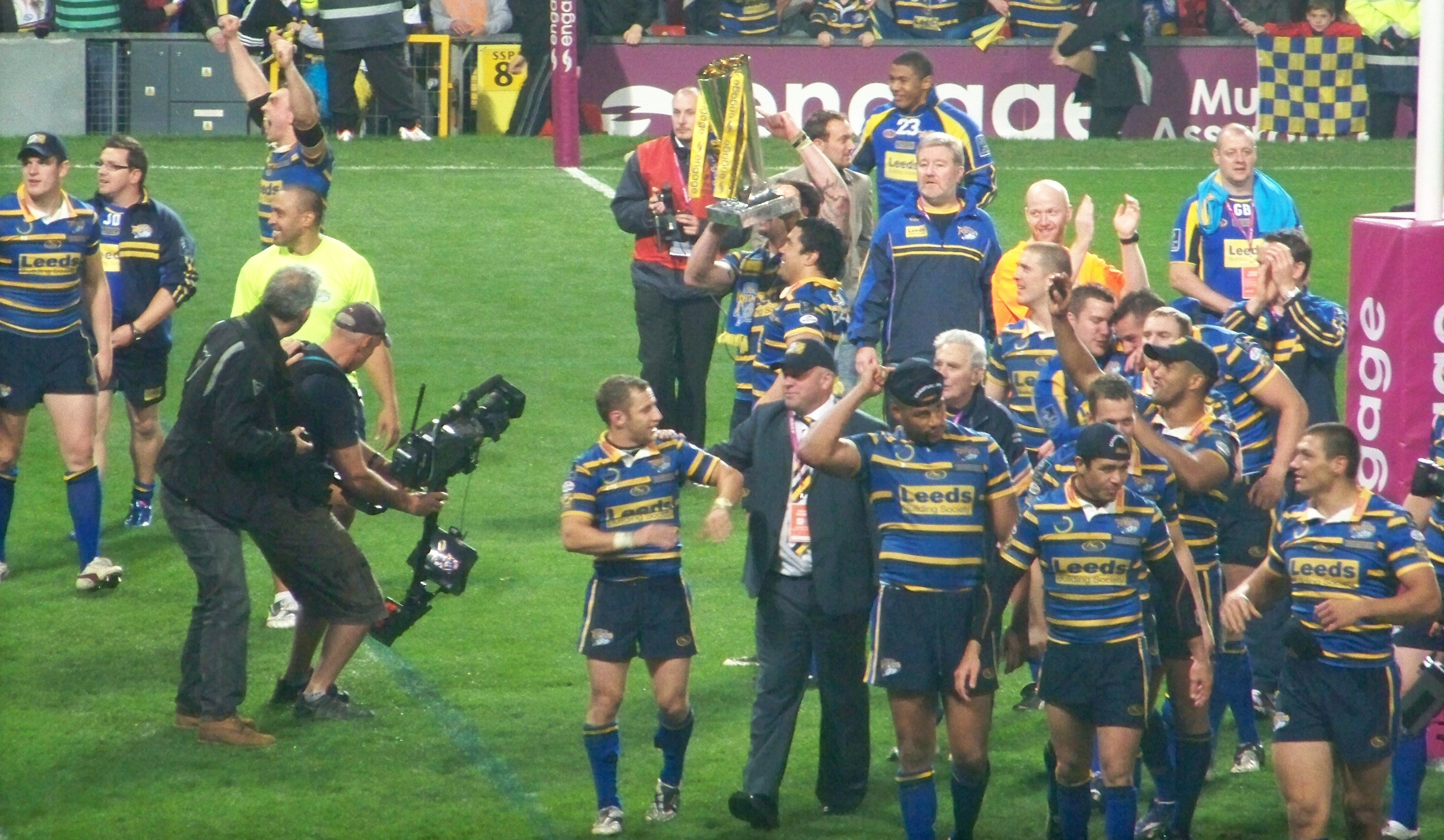
- Leeds Rhinos victory parade at Old Trafford
Leeds Rhinos	St. Helens
18	10
	1	2	Total
LEE	8	10	18
ST H	8	2	10
- Date: 10 October 2009
- Stadium: Old Trafford
- Location: (England) Manchester
- Harry Sunderland Trophy: (England) Kevin Sinfield ( Leeds Rhinos)
- Headliners: The Wombats
- Referee: Steve Ganson
- Attendance: 63,259

Broadcast partners
- Broadcasters: Sky Sports
- Commentators: Eddie Hemmings; Mike Stephenson; Phil Clarke; Terry O'Connor; Barrie McDermott

The 2009 Super League Grand Final was the 12th official grand final and conclusive and championship-deciding match of the Super League XIV season. It was held on Saturday 10 October 2009, at Old Trafford, Manchester, and was contested by defending champions and 2009 League Leaders Leeds Rhinos, and the team they had faced in the grand final for the past two years, St. Helens.

The 2009 decider, contested by the sides finishing 1st and 2nd in the competition, was a very close contest, played at a furious pace from end to end with the lead changing several times and rarely being more than a single point. Every ruling on try-scoring situations was given by the video referee, with some allowed and some disallowed, including a few very close and controversial calls. Leeds Rhinos were eventual victors, winning the match 18 to 10. They became the first side in Super League history to be champions in three successive years.

== Background ==
#	Team	Pld	W	D	L	PF	PA	PD	Pts
1	Leeds Rhinos	27	21	0	6	805	453	+352	42
2	St. Helens	27	19	0	8	733	466	+267	38

=== Route to the Final ===
==== Leeds Rhinos ====
Round	Opposition	Score
Qualifying Play-Off	Hull Kingston Rovers (H)	44-8
Qualifying Semi-Final	Catalans Dragons (H)	27-20
Key: (H) = Home venue; (A) = Away venue; (N) = Neutral venue.

==== St Helens ====
Round	Opposition	Score
Qualifying Play-Off	Huddersfield Giants (H)	15-2
Qualifying Semi-Final	Wigan Warriors (H)	14-10
Key: (H) = Home venue; (A) = Away venue; (N) = Neutral venue.

== Match details ==
It was the third consecutive year that these two teams faced each other in the Super League Grand Final. Both sides were at full strength.

Pre-match entertainment was provided by The Wombats, an indie rock band from Liverpool. The band performed songs from their album, A Guide to Love, Loss & Desperation. All Angels, a classical and pop group, performed, with Yorkshire Co-op Brass Band, the Grand Final anthem, Jerusalem.

10 October 2009
18:05 UTC+1

Leeds Rhinos	18 - 10	St. Helens
Tries: Matt Diskin; Lee Smith (2); Goals: Kevin Sinfield; Drops: Kevin Sinfield; Rob Burrow	Report	Tries: Kyle Eastmond; Goals: Kyle Eastmond (3)

Old Trafford, Manchester
Attendance: 63,259
Referee: Steve Ganson
Player of the Match: Kevin Sinfield

Leeds Rhinos		Position	St Helens	
1	(Australia) Brent Webb	FB	1	(England) Paul Wellens
2	(Australia) Scott Donald	WG	2	(England) Ade Gardner
3	(England) Lee Smith	CE	3	(Australia) Matthew Gidley
4	(England) Keith Senior	CE	18	(England) Kyle Eastmond
5	(England) Ryan Hall	WG	5	(Samoa) Francis Meli
6	(England) Danny McGuire	SO	6	(England) Leon Pryce
7	(England) Rob Burrow	SH	7	(England) Sean Long
8	(New Zealand) Kylie Leuluai	PR	10	(England) James Graham
14	(England) Matt Diskin	HK	9	(Wales) Keiron Cunningham (c)
10	(England) Jamie Peacock	PR	16	(New Zealand) Tony Puletua
11	(England) Jamie Jones-Buchanan	SR	13	(England) Chris Flannery
18	(England) Carl Ablett	SR	12	(England) Jon Wilkin
13	(England) Kevin Sinfield (c)	LF	11	(England) Lee Gilmour
12	(New Zealand) Ali Lauitiiti	Int.	14	(England) James Roby
16	(England) Ryan Bailey	Int.	15	(England) Bryn Hargreaves
17	(England) Ian Kirke	Int.	17	(England) Paul Clough
19	(England) Luke Burgess	Int	23	(Samoa) Maurie Fa'asavalu
	(New Zealand) Brian McClennan	Coach		(Australia) Mick Potter

=== First Half ===
St Helens kicked off and after thirteen minutes of end-to-end football they were thirty metres out from Leeds' goal-line when Jon Wilkin chip-kicked the ball ahead for Kyle Eastmond to regather, crossing the line then running back infield to improve the field position for the kick before grounding it. Video referee Phil Bentham only gave the four points after checking that there was no knock-on in the regather and Grand Final débutante Eastmond converted his own try to give the Saints a 6 nil lead. In the twenty-sixth minute, St. Helens were again down in Leeds' half when Sean Long put up a bomb and as the ball came down the Rhinos defence was ruled to have interfered with the attacking Saints players, drawing a penalty. The decision to take the two points was made and the goal was kicked by Eastmond, pushing St. Helens' lead out to 8 nil. A few minutes later Leeds had managed to get to the other end of the field and were on the attack when Matt Diskin dived over the line from dummy half, reaching out through the defenders to put the ball down. The video referee was again called on to make the ruling and gave the try. Kevin Sinfield's conversion attempt hit the upright so the score was 8 - 4 in favour of St. Helens with less than ten minutes of the first half remaining. In the thirty-seventh minute the Rhinos were again in an attacking position when Danny McGuire got the ball out to the right and chipped it ahead in goal where the St. Helens defence failed to secure it and Lee Smith came through to touch it down. Sinfield again missed the conversion so the scores remained level at 8 all and did not change before the half-time siren.

=== 2nd half ===
Leeds kicked off and the ball went over the line after touching the arm of St. Helens' winger Ade Gardner. This gave a scrum feed to the Rhinos in an attacking position and when Sinfield got the ball close to the uprights he kicked a drop goal, putting Leeds in front for the first time in the match at 9 - 8. Just on forty-five minutes St. Helens centre Matt Gidley made a break and sent his winger Ade Gardner racing down the sideline to try to score in the corner. But after video analysis it was shown that the Leeds defenders coming across had forced him into touch before he grounded the ball. In the 58th minute St. Helens were again down at Leeds' end of the field when they got a penalty for a high shot on Sean Long from Rob Burrow. Saints opted to take the two points and Kyle Eastmond performed his third successful kick in a row, giving his side a one-point lead at 10-9. About seven minutes later Leeds were right down on St. Helens' goal line when Keiron Cunningham, in an attempt to slow things down, knocked the ball out of a Rhinos player's arms as he got up to play it, giving away a penalty. Sinfield's kick from right in front was never going to miss, so the one-point lead was with Leeds once again at 11-10, now with just over fifteen minutes remaining. At the sixty-eight-minute mark, St. Helens were on the attack and moved the ball out to Eastmond's wing where he dived over in the corner. Again the video referee was called on to check whether the St. Helens winger was taken into touch before scoring and he was, a desperate tackle by Sinfield pushing Eastmond's body into the corner post. Back at the other end of the field, Saints' goal-line defence was forced to absorb mounting pressure as Leeds attacked repeatedly, eventually penetrating when a chip kick from McGuire on the last tackle was chased and picked up by Lee Smith who touched down in the seventy-third minute. Once more the video referee's decision was requested, this time to check whether the scorer was on-side. Despite Smith appearing to be slightly in front of McGuire when the ball left his boot, the benefit of the doubt was given and the try was awarded.

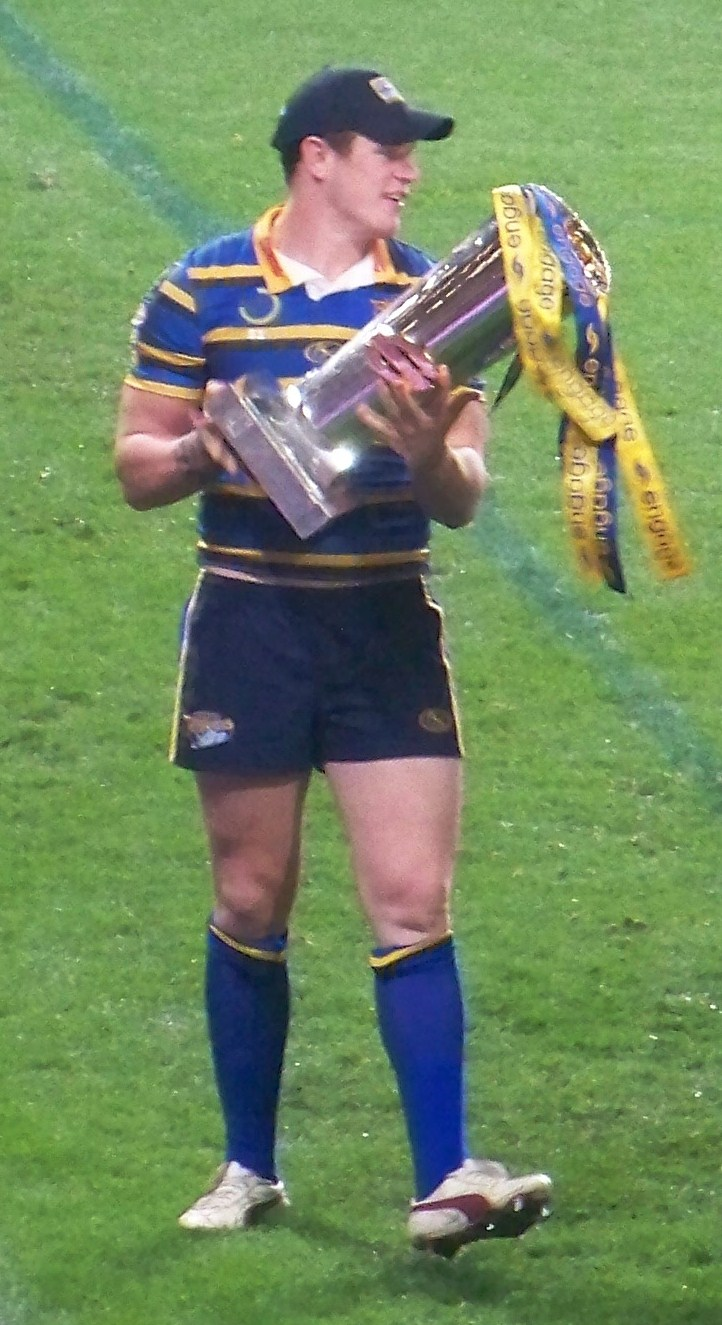
Luke Burgess with the cup following the game.

The extras were kicked from straight in front by Sinfield, so the score was 17-10 in favour of Leeds with under seven minutes of play remaining. Just on the seventy-eight-minute mark the ball went to Rob Burrow for a drop goal attempt which he kicked successfully, putting the score at 18-10, which it would remain until the full-time siren.

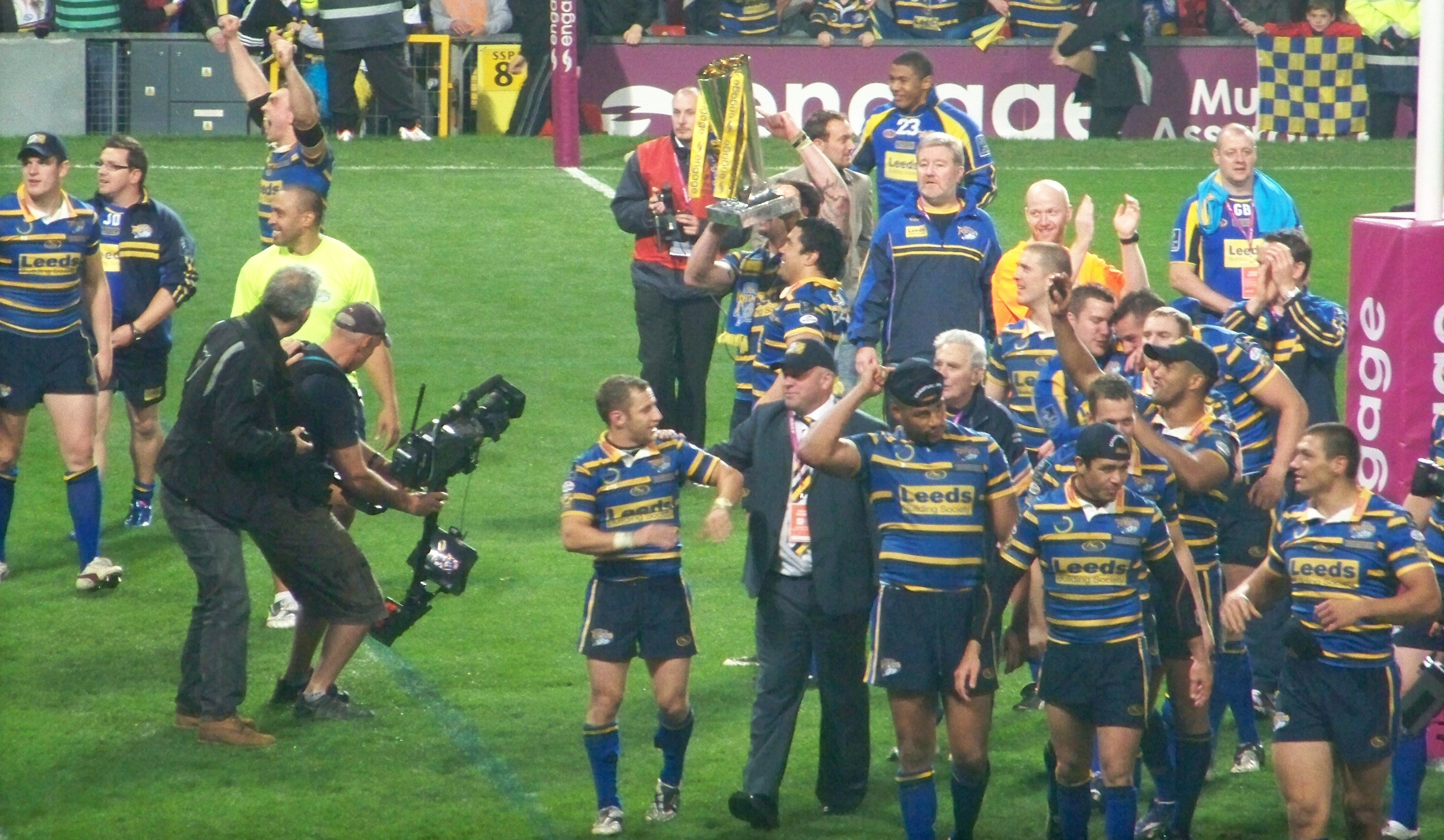
Leeds Rhinos celebrate their victory.

It was the Rhinos' two-try hero, Lee Smith's final game for Leeds before moving to rugby union. Leeds' forward Kevin Sinfield was awarded the Harry Sunderland Trophy as man-of-the-match.

The following day over 8,000 fans were at Headingley Carnegie Stadium to celebrate the victorious Leeds players' homecoming.

== Telecast details ==
The Grand Final was shown in 30 countries worldwide with a potential audience of over 100 million people. In addition to a live broadcast in the United Kingdom by primary broadcast partner Sky Sports, the game was also shown live in the United States, the Middle East, Russia, Romania, Poland and New Zealand. France, Australia, Papua New Guinea, Serbia, Croatia, Slovenia and Spain saw the match in a delayed telecast. BBC Sport showed an hour-long programme of extended highlights.

== 2010 World Club Challenge ==
Having won the grand final, the Leeds Rhinos had earned the right to play against the 2009 NRL grand final-winners, the Melbourne Storm in the 2010 World Club Challenge.
