= Maurie Fa'asavalu =

GB & England international rugby league and Samoa international rugby union footballer

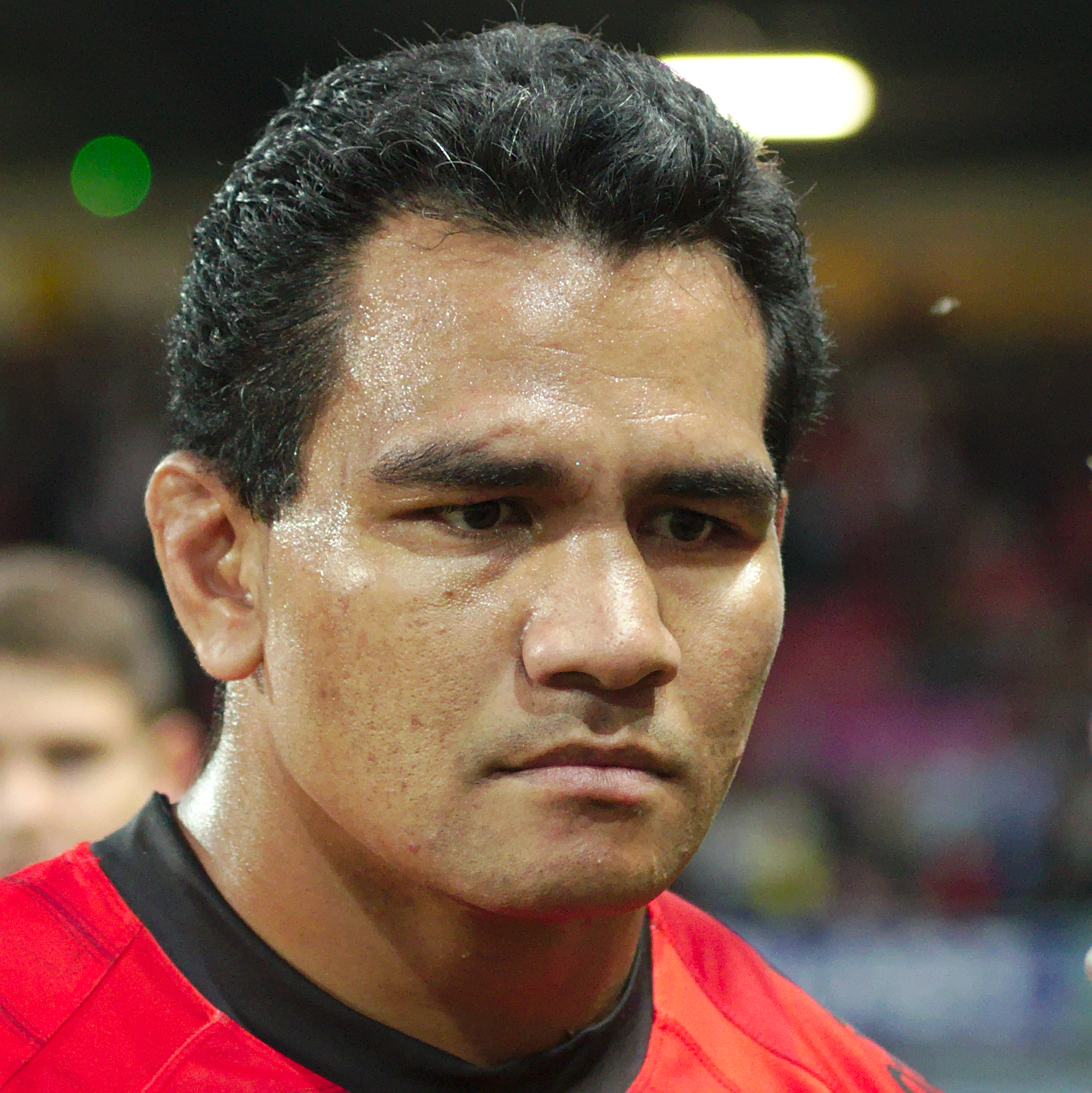
- Full name: Maurie Fa'asavalu
- Born: 12 January 1980 (age 46) Motoʻotua, Western Samoa
- Height: 1.91 m (6 ft 3 in)
- Weight: 112 kg (17 st 9 lb)

Rugby union career
- Position: Flanker
Senior career
Years	Team	Apps	(Points)
–	Taula Apia RU		
2010–14	Harlequins	85	(25)
2014–18	Oyonnax	62	(20)
–	West Park St Helens		
International career
Years	Team	Apps	(Points)
2002–17	Samoa	28	(10)
- Rugby league career

Playing information
- Position: Prop
Club
Years	Team	Pld	T	G	FG	P
2003–10	St Helens	164	39	0	0	156
Representative
Years	Team	Pld	T	G	FG	P
2007	Great Britain	2	1	0	0	4
2008–09	England	3	1	0	0	4

Maurie Fa'asavalu (born 12 January 1980) is a former professional rugby union and rugby league footballer who played in the 2000s and 2010s. He has played representative level rugby union (RU) for Samoa, and at club level for Taula Apia Rugby Union, Harlequins and Oyonnax, and representative level rugby league (RL) for Great Britain and England, and at club level for St. Helens. He was selected for the Great Britain national rugby league team squad in 2007, after living in England for 4 years. He returned to rugby union in October 2010, having signed for Harlequins for the 2010–11 English Premiership season. He then transferred to Oyonnax in France. More recently he has joined West Park St Helens as player/ coach.

== Rugby union career ==
Fa'asavalu played for Samoa at the 2003 Rugby World Cup.

He was signed by the then St. Helens coach Ian Millward in the winter of 2003 after a series of outstanding performances playing at flanker for Samoa in the 2003 Rugby World Cup. On his return to rugby union, he also featured in the 2011 Rugby World Cup.

Harlequins managed to lure the Great Britain (RL), and Samoan (RU) international back to rugby union. "A player of Maurie's talent and ability will be a great asset to Quins," said Quins' Director of Rugby Conor O'Shea, "I have no doubt that he will be able to make an immediate impact on returning to union. He will bring experience and a new dimension to our options and is exactly the type of person we want at this club." He started for Harlequins in their 2011–12 English Premiership Final victory over Leicester Tigers.

On 4 April 2014, Maurie signed for French side Oyonnax who compete in the Top 14 on a two-year contract.

On 4 Oct 2021 it was reported that he had turned out for West Park St Helens in their local derby win over Liverpool St Helens. As of 2024, he was still at the club as a coach.

== Rugby league career ==
=== St Helens ===
Fa'asavalu made his début on 13 March 2004 against Leeds Rhinos in a 24 – 14 victory at Knowsley Road. Fa'asavalu took some time to adjust to rugby league, but developed into an important part of the St. Helens squad in 2006. He was however used primarily as an impact player, starting most games from the interchange bench. Fas'asavalu was unlucky not to receive the Lance Todd Trophy for his performance in the 2006 Challenge Cup Final victory, where he scored a try in the 2006 and his performance against Huddersfield Giants earned widespread praise. St. Helens fans were treated to Fa'asavalu's victory dance in both the 2006 Challenge Cup Final and the Grand Final for 2006's Super League XI. His block busting runs and inimitable try celebrations saw him develop a real following on the terraces at Knowsley Road. In total he scored 10 tries in 28 games during the 2006 season. St Helens reached the 2006 Super League Grand final to be contested against Hull FC, and Fa'asavalu played from the interchange bench in Saints' 26–4 victory. This was followed by 9 tries in 30 games in the 2007 season. He played in 2007's Super League XIII Grand Final, 2008's Super League XIII Grand Final, and 2009's Super League XIV Grand Final defeats all against the Leeds Rhinos.

He played in the 2009 Super League Grand Final defeat by the Leeds Rhinos at Old Trafford.

He missed a major part of the 2010 season after being injured. His last game for St. Helens was in the home victory over Leeds Rhinos.

=== International ===
On 27 October 2007, Fa'asavalu scored on his début for Great Britain against New Zealand in Huddersfield, helping the British team to a 20–14 victory. Five minutes after he came on as a substitute in the 18th minute, Fa'asavalu used his great stature to break through 3 New Zealand players to score the try.

Fa'asavalu was selected for the England squad to compete in the 2008 Rugby League World Cup tournament in Australia. Group A's first match against Papua New Guinea he played from the interchange bench in England's victory. He played 3 games for the England team in the World Cup, in the process breaking his hand in the defeat against Australia.
