= Chris Flannery (rugby league) =

Australian rugby league footballer and administrator

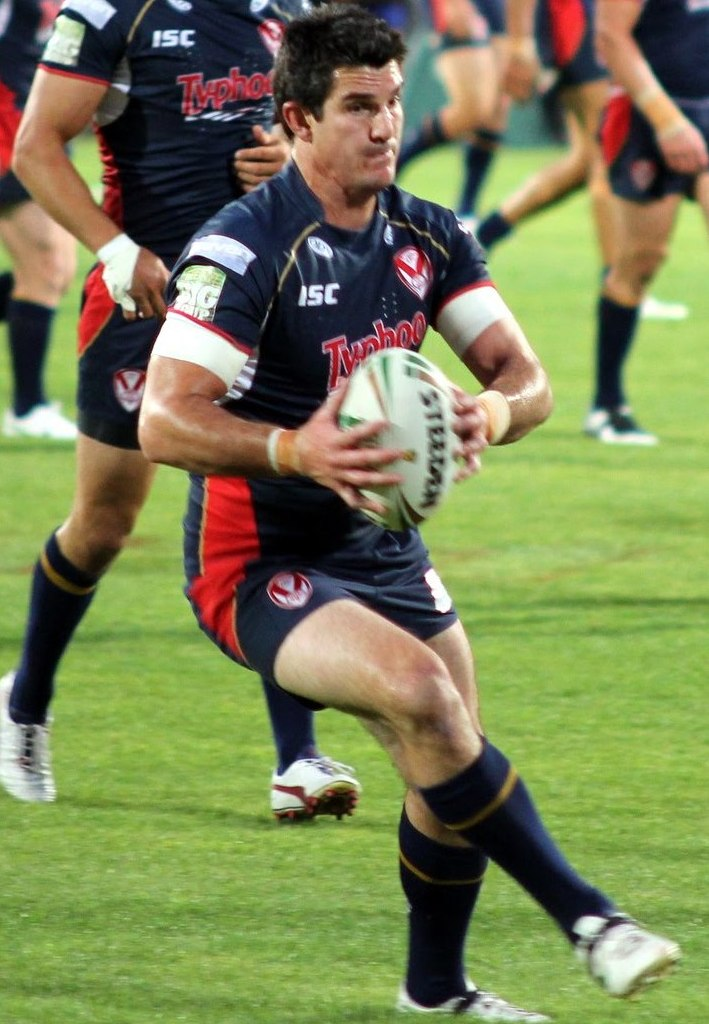

Personal information
- Full name: Christopher Flannery
- Born: 5 June 1980 (age 46) Cowra, New South Wales, Australia

Playing information
- Height: 186 cm (6 ft 1 in)
- Weight: 100 kg (15 st 10 lb)
- Position: Lock, Second-row, Centre, Five-eighth
Club
Years	Team	Pld	T	G	FG	P
2000–06	Sydney Roosters	126	38	0	0	152
2007–12	St Helens	138	42	0	0	168
	Total	264	80	0	0	320
Representative
Years	Team	Pld	T	G	FG	P
2002–06	Queensland	10	0	0	0	0

Chris Flannery (born 5 June 1980) is an Australian former professional rugby league footballer who played in the 2000s and 2010s.

A Queensland State of Origin representative forward, he played his club football in the National Rugby League for the Sydney Roosters, with whom he won the 2002 NRL Premiership, and in the Super League for St. Helens, with whom he won the 2008 Challenge Cup.

Flannery's usual position was lock although he also played as a second-row, stand-off or centre. After retiring Flannery administered the Sunshine Coast Falcons of the Queensland Cup.

== Background ==
Born in Cowra, New South Wales, Flannery's family moved to the Sunshine Coast, Queensland when he was 10, where he played his junior rugby league for the Kawana Dolphins.

== Playing career ==
=== National Rugby League ===
Flannery made his National Rugby League début for the Sydney Roosters in Round 14 of the 2000 NRL season against the Wests Tigers at Campbelltown Stadium on 7 May. He was first selected to play for Queensland in Game II of the 2002 State of Origin series at ANZ Stadium in Brisbane on 5 June. Queensland won 26–18.

Flannery played for the Roosters from the interchange bench in their 2002 NRL grand final victory over the New Zealand Warriors, scoring a try. Having won the 2002 NRL Premiership, the Roosters traveled to England to play the 2003 World Club Challenge against Super League champions, St. Helens. Flannery played at centre in Sydney's victory. He again played from the interchange bench for the Roosters in the 2003 NRL grand final which was lost to the Penrith Panthers.

Flannery played for Queensland in all three matches of the 2004 State of Origin series. He played for the Roosters at lock forward in their 2004 NRL grand final loss to cross-Sydney rivals, Canterbury-Bankstown.

=== Super League ===
In 2007, Flannery signed for St. Helens on a three-and-a-half-year deal. Flannery was brought in as a direct replacement for fellow Australian Jason Hooper who had to retire following problems with his shoulder. Flannery described himself as a hard worker and strong in defence. "I also like to add a bit to the ball playing by taking it up at first or second receiver. I also like to run good lines into holes." He commenced his Knowsley Road career in July, 2007, after recovering from a broken leg. He played in the 2008 Super League Grand Final defeat by the Leeds Rhinos.

He played in the 2009 Super League Grand Final defeat by the Leeds Rhinos at Old Trafford.

== Post-playing ==
After returning to Australia, Flannery became chief executive of Queensland Cup team the Sunshine Coast Falcons. Flannery was inducted into the Sunshine Coast Sports Hall of Fame in 2023.
