= Paul Wellens =

English rugby league coach (born 1980)

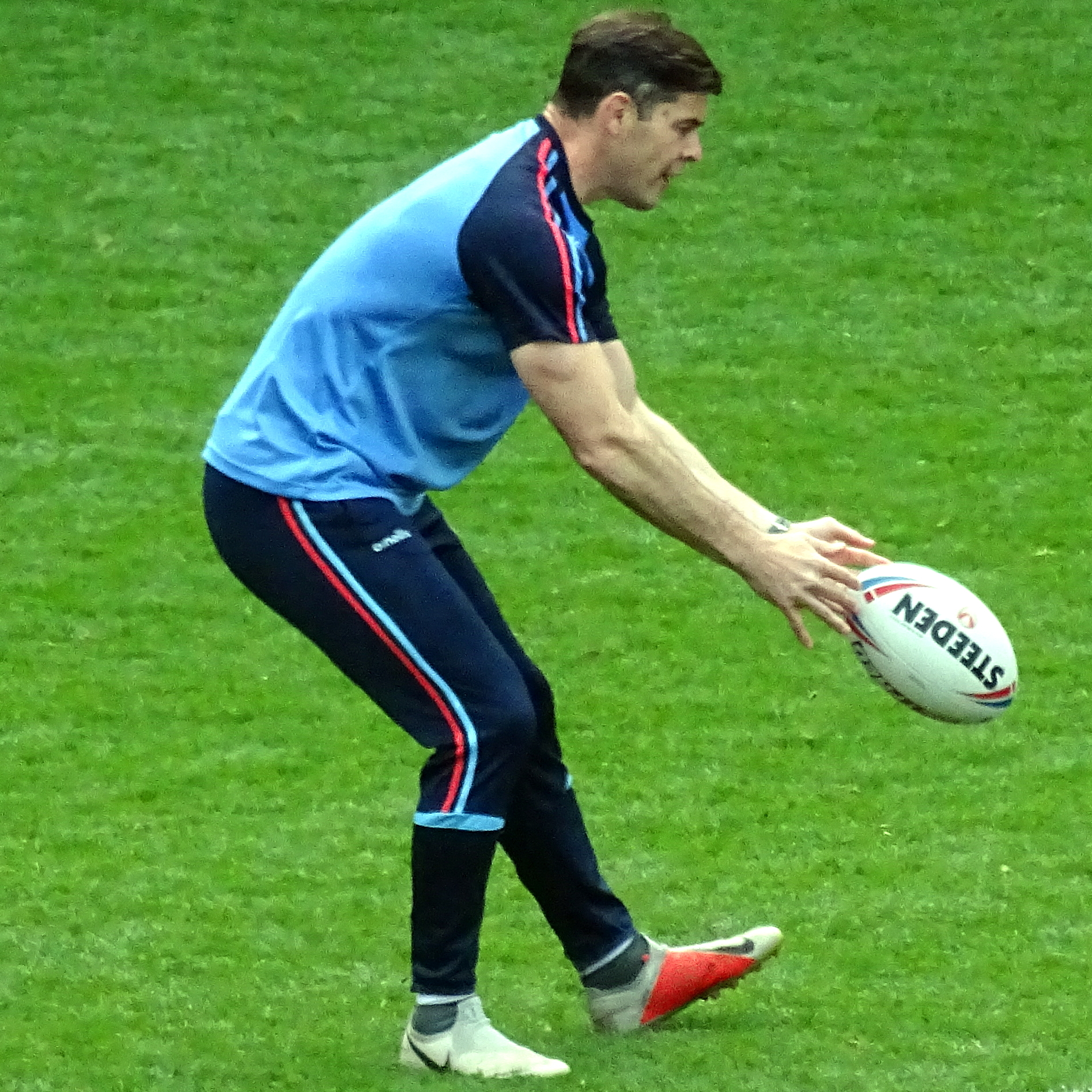

Personal information
- Full name: Paul Simon Wellens
- Born: 27 February 1980 (age 46) St Helens, Merseyside, England
- Height: 6 ft 0 in (1.83 m)
- Weight: 14 st 9 lb (93 kg)

Playing information
- Position: Fullback
Club
| Years | Team | Pld | T | G | FG | P |
|---|---|---|---|---|---|---|
| 1998–15 | St Helens | 499 | 231 | 40 | 1 | 1,005 |
Representative
| Years | Team | Pld | T | G | FG | P |
| 2000–08 | England | 11 | 4 | 0 | 0 | 16 |
| 2001–07 | Great Britain | 20 | 3 | 1 | 0 | 14 |
| 2001–03 | Lancashire | 4 | 3 | 0 | 0 | 12 |

Coaching information
Club
| Years | Team | Gms | W | D | L | W% |
| 2023–25 | St Helens | 95 | 60 | 0 | 35 | 63 |
- Source: As of 9 October 2025

Paul Simon Wellens (born 27 February 1980) is an English professional former rugby league coach who was the head coach of St Helens in the Super League and a former professional rugby league footballer. He is assistant coach of North Queensland Cowboys in the NRL.

A Great Britain and England international fullback, he played his entire career with St Helens, with whom he won several Super League championships and Challenge Cup titles. Wellens also became only the third player to have won the Lance Todd Trophy, Harry Sunderland Trophy and the Man of Steel Award.

== Early life ==
Born in St Helens, Wellens was educated by the De La Salle Christian Brothers, along with his twin sister Claire who as of 2018 is a Drama teacher at De La Salle.

=== Playing career ===
Wellens joined the St. Helens ranks and made his Super League début in the 1999's Super League IV. Success quickly followed and Wellens soon secured his place in perhaps St. Helens strongest era. Wellens became renowned for his all round game, excelling particularly at taking catches. An England call-up followed and with fullback Kris Radlinski already established at international level, Wellens displayed his versatility with spells on the wing and at centre. A call-up for Great Britain ensued, and he made a handful of appearances before being contentiously left out by then coach David Waite, who felt Wellens' form had dipped during this period. Wellens played for St. Helens from the interchange bench in their 1999 Super League Grand Final victory over Bradford Bulls.

==== 2000s ====
Having won the 1999 Championship, St Helens contested in the 2000 World Club Challenge against National Rugby League Premiers the Melbourne Storm, with Wellens playing at hooker in the loss. Wellens played for St Helens at fullback in their 2000 Super League Grand Final victory over Wigan, and in their 2001 World Club Challenge victory against the Brisbane Broncos.

Wellens played for St Helens at fullback in their 2002 Super League Grand Final victory against Bradford Bulls but was forced to leave the field after just two minutes with a broken cheekbone, which ruled him out of Great Britain's international series against New Zealand the following month. With a point to prove, Wellens became one of Super League's most notable performers and made the number 1 jersey his own at international level. His attitude and aptitude to the game earned him a reputation as a model professional. As one of the quieter members of a squad littered with big names and personalities, it was all the more creditable that Wellens earned St Helens player of the season award in 2004 to underline his value at Knowsley Road, establishing himself as one of the fans' favourites. Wellens was selected in the Great Britain team to compete in the end of season 2004 Rugby League Tri-Nations tournament. He played a starring role at fullback where they defeated World champions Australia in game 5 24-12, In the final against Australia he played at fullback in the Lions' 44–4 loss.

In the 2006 season which would see St Helens collect all three major honours at domestic level, Wellens' own form was rewarded with the Rugby League Writers' Association player of the year, Super League players' player of the year and the prestigious Man of Steel Award. Wellens played for St Helens at fullback in their 2006 Challenge Cup Final victory against Huddersfield. He was also awarded the Harry Sunderland Trophy as man of the match against Hull F.C. in 2006's Super League XI Grand Final. As 2006 Super League champions, St Helens faced 2006 NRL Premiers Brisbane Broncos in the 2007 World Club Challenge. Wellens played at fullback in the Saints' 18–14 victory.

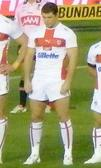
Wellens representing England at the 2008 Rugby League World Cup.

In 2007 Wellens continued his form, but added another dimension to his game by becoming one of the league's top try scorers. This was highlighted in the Millennium Magic weekend victory against rivals Wigan, in which Wellens scored four tries. He was named in the end of season Super League Dream Team for the third season running. He also became joint winner of the Lance Todd Trophy award in the 2007 Carnegie Challenge Cup Final against the Catalans Dragons at Wembley Stadium, sharing the prize with Leon Pryce. In the 2008 Challenge Cup Final, Wellens retained the Lance Todd Trophy award.

Wellens was selected for the England squad to compete in the 2008 Rugby League World Cup in Australia. In Group A's first match against Papua New Guinea he played at fullback in England's victory.

In January 2009, Wellens played in his own testimonial match against Wakefield Trinity.

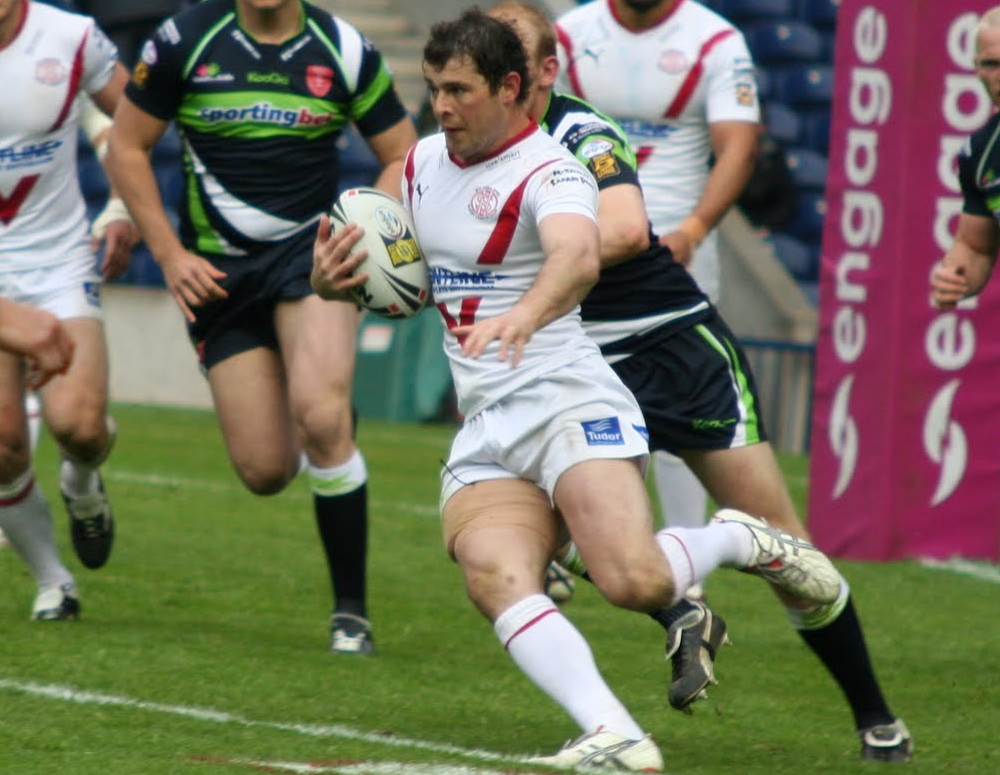
Wellens playing for St Helens in 2010

He played in the 2009 Super League Grand Final defeat by the Leeds Rhinos at Old Trafford.

==== 2010s ====
In 2011, Wellens was named joint captain of St. Helens alongside James Graham. He took over as sole captain following Graham's departure to Canterbury Bulldogs.

He played in the 2011 Super League Grand Final defeat by the Leeds Rhinos at Old Trafford.

In 2014, Wellens made history by scoring the 1,000th point in his career. St Helens reached the 2014 Super League Grand Final, and Wellens captained them from fullback in what was a record-equalling 10th grand final appearance. Saints defeated Wigan Warriors 14–6 to win their first Super League title in 8 years, with Wellens lifting the trophy.

Following a failure to recover from a long-standing hip injury, Wellens announced his retirement from playing on 24 June 2015. In total he played 495 times for St Helens, in the process winning five Super League titles, five Challenge Cup winners medals, two World Club Challenges, the Man of Steel Award, the Lance Todd Trophy, the Harry Sunderland Trophy, and was named in the Super League Dream Team on four occasions.

== Coaching career ==
=== St Helens ===
On 18 February 2023, Wellens coached St Helens to their shock 13-12 victory over Penrith Panthers in the 2023 World Club Challenge. In his first full season in charge, Wellens guided St Helens to a third placed finish on the table. The club lost their semi-final match against the Catalans Dragons on the full-time siren which ended their four-year reign as champions. Wellens second season in charge of St Helens was a disappointing one with the club finishing sixth on the table, their lowest finish in the Super League era. During the season, the club also lost five games in a row. It was the first time since the Super League era began that the club had lost five consecutive games in the league. St Helens were eliminated in the playoffs against Warrington in golden point extra-time. In the 2025 Super League season, Wellens guided St Helens to fifth on the table. Wellens took St Helens to one game from the grand final before they were defeated by Hull Kingston Rovers 20-12. His contract was not renewed at the conclusion of his third year of coaching St Helens, confirmed in a club statement on 9 October 2025.

=== North Queensland Cowboys and England assistants ===
On 2 November 2025, Wellens had taken a role of assistant coach at NRL side North Queensland Cowboys

Wellens was also appointed as England assistant coach in 2026 under new head coach Brian McDermott.
