= 2018 Toronto Wolfpack season =

- Championship Rank: 1st
- Play-off result: Runners Up
- Challenge Cup: 6th Round
- 2018 record: Wins: 27; draws: 1; losses: 6
- Points scored: For: 1086; against: 580

Team information
- CEO: (Canada) Eric Perez
- Head Coach: (England) Paul Rowley
- Captain: (Australia) Josh McCrone
- Stadium: Lamport Stadium
- Avg. attendance: 6,908
- Agg. attendance: 96,714
- High attendance: 9,266 (vs. London Broncos)

Top scorers
- Tries: (Republic of Ireland) Liam Kay (26)
- Goals: (Scotland) Ryan Brierley (82)
- Points: (Scotland) Ryan Brierley (214)
← 2017	List of seasons	2019 →

This article details the Toronto Wolfpack's rugby league football club's 2018 season. This is the Wolfpack's 2nd season in their history and 1st season in the Championship after the Wolfpack dominated the 2017 League 1 season and earned promotion to 2018 Rugby League Championship.

== Season review ==
=== September 2017 ===
After winning the 2017 League 1 season and promotion to the Championship, Toronto immediately sought to improve their squad as they announced that centre Tom Armstrong had signed from Super League side Widnes Vikings. Warrington Wolves prop forward Ashton Sims signed for the Wolfpack on a 2-year deal. Albanian prop Olsi Krasniqi was the next to sign from Salford Red Devils along with Australian prop David Taylor from Canberra Raiders and NRL halfback Josh McCrone from St George Illawarra Dragons.

=== October 2017 ===
October started with Toronto paying £130,000 for the services of loose forward Joe Westerman from Warrington Wolves on a three-year deal. Following this, the Wolfpack acquired hooker Andy Ackers from Championship side London Broncos on a two-year deal. During this month it was revealed that the club would be releasing props Steve Crossley, Tom Dempsey and Shaun Pick whilst halfback Rhys Jacks and hooker Sean Penkywicz would also be released.

=== November 2017 ===
The fixtures for the 2018 season were released and it was revealed that Toronto would travel to relegated Leigh Centurions for the first game of the season, the Wolfpack will play their first 11 games away from home before they host Halifax RLFC on April 28. Toronto would also face Leigh during the annual Summer Bash as the headline match. Club captain, Craig Hall, becomes another departing Wolfpack player, leaving on personal terms for family reasons. The Wolfpack also announced a ground breaking Transatlantic Challenge which would see them face the Bradford Bulls in a pre-season match in 2018 and 2019, with the 2018 fixture being played at Odsal Stadium on 26 January and the 2019 fixture likely to be played in Canada or the United States to promote the sport. Furthermore, Toronto agreed to change their UK base from Brighouse Rangers to Manchester Metropolitan University in order to take advantage of better facilities.

=== December 2017 ===
December started with the announcement that the Wolfpack would kick off the Magic Weekend in 2018 by playing against Toulouse Olympique in order to promote the international teams within the sport and also promote the RFL Championship to a wider audience. It was also revealed that Toronto had signed forward Cory Paterson on a two-year deal from relegated Leigh Centurions. Furthermore, the Wolfpack also signed forward Sam Hopkins and winger Adam Higson on a one-year deals from Leigh.

=== January 2018 ===
It was revealed that prop forward Dan Fleming wanted to remain close to home due to the birth of his first child and approached coach Paul Rowley to be released, this was granted and he signed a two-year deal with Championship side Halifax RLFC. Toronto announced that prop forwards Fuifui Moimoi, David Taylor and Ryan Bailey left the club by mutual agreement whilst on a pre-season camp to Portugal. The Wolfpack revealed that newcomer Josh McCrone would captain the side for the 2018 season whilst ex Warrington Wolves prop Ashton Sims would be the club's vice captain. During a press conference for League 1 side Bradford Bulls it was announced that the Wolfpack had entered a dual registration deal with the Bulls. The Wolfpack signed young centre Nick Rawsthorne from Hull F.C. on a two-year deal and also prop forward Jack Buchanan from Widnes Vikings on a one-year deal. In their only pre-season friendly, the Wolfpack comfortably beat Bradford 34–0 with Liam Kay scoring two tries and Quentin Laulu-Togaga'e, Cory Paterson, Blake Wallace and Joe Westerman also scoring tries. Ryan Brierley took over the kicking duties and kicked five from six attempts.

=== February 2018 ===
Life in the Championship started well for the Wolfpack as they beat fellow promotions contenders Leigh Centurions 34–12. Former Leigh player Liam Kay scored a hat trick whilst Ryan Brierley, Cory Paterson and Adam Sidlow also scored tries with Brierley rounding things off with five conversions. Following the opening day victory Toronto announced the signing of Australian centre Jake Butler-Fleming from League 1 side York City Knights. A tough trip to Barrow Raiders saw the Wolfpack grind out a hard fought 8–8 draw in bad conditions, second row Andrew Dixon and centre Nick Rawsthorne both scored tries. Following this Toronto beat Championship stalwarts Halifax R.L.F.C. 20–8, superstar prop Ashton Sims made his debut in this match. Winger Adam Higson scored his first two tries for the club with Greg Worthington and Rawsthorne also crossing the line for a try each whilst Brierley kicked two goals. Toronto bolstered their pack by signing retired player Reni Maitua on a two-year deal. Round 4 found Wolfpack with a 47–16 loss to top of the league London Broncos which gave the Wolfpack their biggest loss so far, Dixon and Richard Whiting scoring tries whilst Liam Kay continued his try scoring form with a try. Brierley converted two goals.

=== March 2018 ===
March found Wolfpack at the top of the Championship thanks to the wins over Easter against Featherstone Rovers 24–16. Game against Swinton Lions was their highest scored so far 52–12. Wolfpack strengthen their squad by signing Salford Red Devil's Fullback Gareth O'Brien and NRL's Canterbury Bulldogs Centre Chase Stanley . Impact of the signing was evident during the game against Batley Bulldogs 26–18 where O'Brien scored his first hat-trick for Wolfpack. Stanley made his first try for the team week later against Dewsbury Rams 23–12.

=== April 2018 ===
Despite being plagued with injuries, Easter Monday win against Toulouse Olympique 24–22 followed by two more with Batley Bulldogs 26–18, Dewsbury Rams 23–12 continued Wolfpack dominance at the top of the table. NRL's Manly Sea Eagles Darcy Lussick signing 3 year contract was a much needed addition to the Wolfpack. As Lamport stadium undergoes renovations, first home game was played in London against Halifax RLFC and won by Wolfpack 42-10.

=== May 2018 ===
Prior their first home game of the season Wolfpack has signed Scottish international and Warrington Wolves Full-back Matty Russell. With Lamport Stadium under maintenance, Canadian opener was played at Fletcher's Fields. Game against Swinton Lions was a decisive win for the Toronto Wolfpack 62–14. Clash with Super League's Warrington Wolves ended up in defeat 66-10 thus ending Wolfpack run for Challenge Cup 2018, while game against Toulouse Olimpique at Dacia Magic Weekend found team winning 43–30 with debut try for Matty Russell and 7th hat-trick for the Wolfpack by Liam Kay. With 25 points they continued to lead Championship Table. Last away game was played during Summer Bash 2018 with Toronto Wolfpack winning 28–26 against Leigh Centurions.

=== June 2018 ===
Month of June found Wolfpack undefeated on their home grounds. Game against London Broncos, the only team Wolfpack lost to in the beginning of the season was a sound 32-12 victory. Gareth O'Brien started as a kicker against Dewsbury Rams and continued through the month with games against Barrow Raiders and Leigh Centurions, rivalry between Wolfpack and the former continues as Wolfpack won all three clashes.

=== July 2018 ===
After the game against Sheffield Eagles (a 68–4 win), Toronto Wolfpack secured the Betfred Championship League Leaders Shield 2018. The Wolfpack had their first home defeat during the regular season against Featherstone Rovers (12–30).

== Competitions ==
Win Draw Loss

=== Pre-season friendlies ===
Date	Home	Score	Away	Venue	Tries	Goals	Attendance
26 January	Bradford Bulls	0-34	Toronto Wolfpack	Odsal Stadium	Kay (2), Laulu-Togaga'e, Paterson, Wallace, Westerman	Brierley 5/6	2,461

=== Challenge Cup ===
Date	Rnd	Home	Score	Away	Venue	Tries	Goals	Attendance
16 March	4th	Kells ARLFC	6-56	Toronto Wolfpack	The Recreation Ground	Kay (3), Rawsthorne (2), Ackers, Brierley, Laulu-Togaga'e, Pownall, Wallace	Brierley 8/10	1,000
22 April	5th	Barrow Raiders	12-16	Toronto Wolfpack	Craven Park	Beswick, O'Brien, Rawsthorne	Brierley 2/3	1,100
13 May	6th	Warrington Wolves	66-10	Toronto Wolfpack	Halliwell Jones Stadium	Higson, Kay	Brierley 1/3	6,507

=== Championship ===
==== Table ====
===== Championship =====
Pos	Team	Pld	W	D	L	PF	PA	PD	Pts	Qualification
1	Toronto Wolfpack	23	20	1	2	866	374	+492	41	The Qualifiers
2	London Broncos	23	16	1	6	907	423	+484	33	The Qualifiers
3	Toulouse Olympique	23	16	1	6	900	438	+462	33	The Qualifiers
4	Halifax	23	16	1	6	643	416	+227	33	The Qualifiers
5	Featherstone Rovers	23	16	0	7	819	420	+399	32	Championship Shield
6	Leigh Centurions	23	16	0	7	849	508	+341	32	Championship Shield
7	Batley Bulldogs	23	8	0	15	523	703	−180	16	Championship Shield
8	Sheffield Eagles	23	7	0	16	437	843	−406	14	Championship Shield
9	Dewsbury Rams	23	6	1	16	424	746	−322	13	Championship Shield
10	Barrow Raiders	23	5	3	15	382	816	−434	13	Championship Shield
11	Swinton Lions	23	3	2	18	402	866	−464	8	Championship Shield
12	Rochdale Hornets	23	4	0	19	327	926	−599	8	Championship Shield

===== Qualifiers =====
Pos	Team	Pld	W	D	L	PF	PA	PD	Pts	Qualification
1	Salford Red Devils	7	5	0	2	218	75	+143	10	Super League XXIV
2	Leeds Rhinos	7	5	0	2	216	137	+79	10	Super League XXIV
3	Hull KR	7	5	0	2	197	162	+35	10	Super League XXIV
4	Toronto Wolfpack	7	5	0	2	136	118	+18	10	Million Pound Game
5	London Broncos (P)	7	4	0	3	161	164	−3	8	Million Pound Game
6	Toulouse Olympique	7	3	0	4	156	190	−34	6	2019 Championship
7	Widnes Vikings (R)	7	1	0	6	92	173	−81	2	2019 Championship
8	Halifax	7	0	0	7	68	225	−157	0	2019 Championship

(P) Promoted; (R) Relegated

==== Results ====
Date	Rnd	Home	Score	Away	Venue	Tries	Goals	Attendance
4 February	1	Leigh Centurions	12-34	Toronto Wolfpack	Leigh Sports Village	Kay (3), Brierley, Paterson, Sidlow	Brierley 5/7	5,452
11 February	2	Barrow Raiders	8-8	Toronto Wolfpack	Craven Park	Dixon, Rawsthorne	Brierley 0/2	1,266
18 February	3	Halifax	6-20	Toronto Wolfpack	Shay Stadium	Higson (2), Rawsthorne, Worthington	Brierley 2/5	2,036
25 February	4	London Broncos	47-16	Toronto Wolfpack	Trailfinders Sports Ground	Dixon, Kay, Whiting	Brierley 2/3	1,205
4 March	5	Swinton Lions	12-52	Toronto Wolfpack	Heywood Road	Brierley (2), Butler-Fleming (2), Wallace (2), Ackers, Laulu-Togaga'e, Pownall	Brierley 8/9	701
11 March	6	Sheffield Eagles	10-44	Toronto Wolfpack	Olympic Legacy Park	Pownall (2), Whiting (2), Kay, Rawsthorne, Sidlow, Wallace	Brierley 6/8	863
23 March	7	Rochdale Hornets	17-18	Toronto Wolfpack	Spotland Stadium	Kay, Maitua, McCrone	Brierley 3/4	504
30 March	8	Featherstone Rovers	16-24	Toronto Wolfpack	Post Office Road	Brierley (2), Whiting (2)	Brierley 4/6	3,131
2 April	9	Toulouse Olympique	22-24	Toronto Wolfpack	Stade Ernest-Argelès	Rawsthorne (2), Ackers, Kay, Pownall	Brierley 2/5	3,513
8 April	10	Batley Bulldogs	18-26	Toronto Wolfpack	Mount Pleasant	O'Brien (3), Bussey, McCrone	Brierley 3/5	1,151
15 April	11	Dewsbury Rams	12-23	Toronto Wolfpack	Crown Flatt	Higson (2), Brierley, Maitua, Stanley	Brierley 1/6, Brierley 1 DG	932
28 April	12	Toronto Wolfpack	42-10	Halifax	New River Stadium	Kay (2), Ackers, Beswick, Brierley, Lussick, Paterson	Brierley 7/7	1,656
5 May	13	Toronto Wolfpack	62-14	Swinton Lions	Fletcher's Fields	Kay (3), O'Brien (2), Dixon, Higson, Krasniqi, Rawsthorne, Sidlow, Stanley, Wallace	Brierley 7/12	2,917
19 May	14	Toronto Wolfpack	43-30	Toulouse Olympique	St James' Park	Kay (3), Brierley, Dixon, Hopkins, Russell, Stanley	Brierley 5/8, Brierley 1 DG	38,881 (Note: Aggregate number of visitors at the first day of Magic Weekend)
26 May	15	Toronto Wolfpack	28-26	Leigh Centurions	Bloomfield Road	Krasniqi, McCrone, O'Brien, Paterson, Rawsthorne	Brierley 4/5	7,877
9 June	16	Toronto Wolfpack	32-12	London Broncos	Lamport Stadium	Paterson (2), Brierley, Kay, McCrone	Brierley 6/7	7,384
16 June	17	Toronto Wolfpack	64-12	Dewsbury Rams	Lamport Stadium	O'Brien (2), Ackers, Buchanan, Kay, Lussick, Paterson, Rawsthorne, Russell, Stanley, Wallace	O'Brien 10/11	5,937
23 June	18	Toronto Wolfpack	64-0	Barrow Raiders	Lamport Stadium	Kay (2), Rawsthorne (2), Wallace (2), Ackers, Beswick, O'Brien, Paterson, Russell, Sidlow	O'Brien 8/12	5,287
30 June	19	Toronto Wolfpack	46-28	Leigh Centurions	Lamport Stadium	Wallace (3), Ackers (2), Russell (2), Kay	O'Brien 7/9	6,844
7 July	20	Toronto Wolfpack	68-4	Sheffield Eagles	Lamport Stadium	Higson (2), Stanley (2), Beswick, Brierley, Dixon, Kay, O'Brien, Rawsthorne, Wallace, Whiting	O'Brien 10/12	6,329
14 July	21	Toronto Wolfpack	64-18	Batley Bulldogs	Lamport Stadium	Wallace (3), Ackers (2), Beswick, Brierley, Higson, Paterson, Rawsthorne, Stanley, Worthington	O'Brien 4/6, Brierley 4/6	6,088
21 July	22	Toronto Wolfpack	52-10	Rochdale Hornets	Lamport Stadium	Wheeler (2), Ackers, Buchanan, Hopkins, Kay, Paterson, Sidlow, Stanley, Whiting	O'Brien 6/10	7,144
28 July	23	Toronto Wolfpack	12-30	Featherstone Rovers	Lamport Stadium	Sidlow, Sims	Brierley 2/2	8,217

==== Super 8s ====
Date	Rnd	Home	Score	Away	Venue	Tries	Goals	Attendance
12 August	24	Halifax	0-14	Toronto Wolfpack	Shay Stadium	Ackers, Dixon	O'Brien 3/3	1,768
18 August	25	Toronto Wolfpack	22-28	Hull KR	Lamport Stadium	Dixon (2), Rawsthorne	O'Brien 5/5	7,540
1 September	26	Toronto Wolfpack	34-22	London Broncos	Lamport Stadium	Caton-Brown, McCrone, O'Brien, Stanley, Wallace	O'Brien 6/6	7,557
8 September	27	Salford Red Devils	28-16	Toronto Wolfpack	AJ Bell Stadium	Ackers, Russell, Sidlow	O’Brien 2/3	2,509
15 September	28	Toronto Wolfpack	13-12	Toulouse Olympique	Lamport Stadium	Caton-Brown, Rawsthorne, Stanley	O'Brien 0/3, O'Brien 1 DG	7,923
22 September	29	Toronto Wolfpack	20-12	Widnes Vikings	Lamport Stadium	Paterson, Russell, Wallace	O'Brien 4/5	8,281
28 September	30	Leeds Rhinos	16-17	Toronto Wolfpack	Headingley	Paterson, Rawsthorne, Russell	O'Brien 2/4, O'Brien 1 DG	11,565

==== Million Pound Game ====
Date	Rnd	Home	Score	Away	Venue	Tries	Goals	Attendance
7 October	MPG	Toronto Wolfpack	2-4	London Broncos	Lamport Stadium		O'Brien 1/1	9,266

== Squad statistics ==
Statistics include Championship, Challenge Cup and Super 8s matches, as of 9 October 2018.

No	Player	Position	Age	Apps	Tries	Goals	DG	Points
1	Quentin Laulu-Togaga'e	Fullback	34	9	2	0	0	8
2	Jonathan Pownall	Wing	27	8	5	0	0	20
3	Greg Worthington	Centre	28	18	2	0	0	8
4	Gary Wheeler	Stand-off	28	10	2	0	0	8
5	Liam Kay	Wing	27	23	23	0	0	92
6	Josh McCrone	Halfback	31	28	5	0	0	20
7	Ryan Brierley	Scrum-half	26	23	12	82	2	214
8	Jack Buchanan	Prop	26	26	1	0	0	4
9	Bob Beswick	Hooker	34	23	3	0	0	12
10	Ashton Sims	Prop	33	26	1	0	0	4
11	Andrew Dixon	Second-row	28	27	8	0	0	32
12	Joe Westerman	Lock	29	6	0	0	0	0
13	Jack Bussey	Loose forward	26	16	1	0	0	4
14	Andy Ackers	Hooker	25	29	11	0	0	44
15	Adam Sidlow	Prop	31	35	6	0	0	24
16	Reni Maitua	Second-row	36	8	2	0	0	8
17	Blake Wallace	Stand-off	26	22	14	0	0	56
18	James Laithwaite	Second-row	27	2	0	0	0	0
19	Adam Higson	Wing	31	11	9	0	0	36
20	Tom Armstrong	Centre	29	0	0	0	0	0
21	Olsi Krasniqi	Prop	26	16	2	0	0	8
22	Richard Whiting	Second-row	34	21	7	0	0	28
23	Nick Rawsthorne	Centre	23	18	15	0	0	60
24	Cory Paterson	Lock	31	15	9	0	0	36
25	Jake Butler-Fleming	Centre	26	1	2	0	0	8
26	Ryan Burroughs	Wing	27	0	0	0	0	0
27	Quinn Ngawati	Centre	19	1	0	0	0	0
28	Sam Hopkins	Prop	28	19	2	0	0	8
29	Jacob Emmitt	Prop	30	26	0	0	0	0
30	Matty Russell	Fullback	24	10	6	0	0	24
31	Gareth O'Brien	Fullback	26	20	9	68	2	170
32	Darcy Lussick	Prop	28	15	1	0	0	4
33	Chase Stanley	Centre	28	16	9	0	0	36
34	Mason Caton-Brown	Wing	25	7	2	0	0	8

=== Transfers ===
==== In ====
Nat	Name	Position	Signed from	Date
(England)	Tom Armstrong	Centre	Widnes Vikings	August 2017
(Fiji)	Ashton Sims	Prop	Warrington Wolves	September 2017
(Albania)	Olsi Krasniqi	Prop	Salford Red Devils	September 2017
(Australia)	David Taylor	Prop	Canberra Raiders	September 2017
(Australia)	Josh McCrone	Scrum half	St George Illawarra Dragons	September 2017
(England)	Joe Westerman	Loose forward	Warrington Wolves	October 2017
(England)	Andy Ackers	Hooker	London Broncos	October 2017
(Australia)	Cory Paterson	Second row	Leigh Centurions	December 2017
(Wales)	Sam Hopkins	Prop	Leigh Centurions	December 2017
(England)	Adam Higson	Wing	Leigh Centurions	December 2017
(England)	Nick Rawsthorne	Centre	Hull F.C.	January 2018
(Australia)	Jack Buchanan	Prop	Widnes Vikings	January 2018
(Australia)	Jake Butler-Fleming	Centre	York City Knights	February 2018
(Australia)	Reni Maitua	Second row	Retirement	February 2018
(England)	Gareth O'Brien	Fullback	Salford Red Devils	March 2018
(New Zealand)	Chase Stanley	Centre	Canterbury Bulldogs	March 2018
(Australia)	Darcy Lussick	Forward	Manly Sea Eagles	April 2018
(Scotland)	Matty Russell	Fullback	Warrington Wolves	May 2018
(England)	Mason Caton-Brown	Wing	Wakefield Trinity	July 2018

==== Out ====
Nat	Name	Position	Club signed	Date
(England)	Steve Crossley	Prop	Bradford Bulls	October 2017
(Canada)	Tom Dempsey	Prop	Released	October 2017
(Canada)	Rhys Jacks	Scrum half	Released	October 2017
(United States)	Joe Eichner	Second row	Australia	October 2017
(Wales)	Sean Penkywicz	Hooker	Workington Town	October 2017
(England)	Shaun Pick	Prop	Sheffield Eagles	October 2017
(England)	Craig Hall	Centre	Leigh Centurions	November 2017
(England)	Dan Fleming	Prop	Halifax RLFC	January 2018
(Australia)	David Taylor	Prop	Sacked	January 2018
(Tonga)	Fuifui Moimoi	Prop	Sacked	January 2018
(England)	Ryan Bailey	Prop	Sacked	January 2018
(England)	Joe Westerman	Loose forward	Hull F.C.	April 2018
(Samoa)	Quentin Laulu-Togaga'e	Fullback	Halifax RLFC	April 2018
(England)	Tom Armstrong	Centre	Released	April 2018
(Australia)	Reni Maitua	Second row	Retirement	April 2018

== Milestones ==
- Round 1: Josh McCrone, Jack Buchanan, Joe Westerman, Andy Ackers, Adam Higson, Nick Rawsthorne, Cory Paterson and Sam Hopkins made their debut for the Wolfpack.
- Round 1: Liam Kay scored his 4th hat-trick for the Wolfpack.
- Round 1: Cory Paterson scored his 1st try for the Wolfpack.
- Round 1: Ryan Brierley kicked his 1st goal for the Wolfpack.
- Round 2: Olsi Krasniqi made his debut for the Wolfpack.
- Round 3: Ashton Sims made his debut for the Wolfpack.
- Round 3: Adam Higson scored his 1st try for the Wolfpack.
- Round 5: Jake Butler-Fleming and Reni Maitua made their debut for the Wolfpack.
- Round 5: Jake Butler-Fleming scored his 1st try for the Wolfpack.
- Round 6: Ryan Brierley reached 100 points for the Wolfpack.
- CCR4: Liam Kay scored his 5th hat-trick for the Wolfpack.
- Round 7: Gareth O'Brien made his debut for the Wolfpack.
- Round 7: Reni Maitua and Josh McCrone scored their 1st try for the Wolfpack.
- Round 8: Chase Stanley made his debut for the Wolfpack.
- Round 10: Gareth O'Brien scored his 1st try for the Wolfpack.
- Round 10: Gareth O'Brien scored his 1st hat-trick for the Wolfpack.
- Round 11: Chase Stanley scored his 1st try for the Wolfpack.
- Round 11: Ryan Brierley kicked his 1st drop goal for the Wolfpack.
- CCR5: Darcy Lussick made his debut for the Wolfpack.
- Round 12: Darcy Lussick scored his 1st try for the Wolfpack.
- Round 13: Olsi Krasniqi scored his 1st try for the Wolfpack.
- Round 13: Liam Kay scored his 6th hat-trick for the Wolfpack.
- Round 13: Ryan Brierley reached 200 points for the Wolfpack.
- Round 14: Matty Russell made his debut for the Wolfpack.
- Round 14: Sam Hopkins and Matty Russell scored their 1st try for the Wolfpack.
- Round 14: Liam Kay scored his 7th hat-trick for the Wolfpack.
- Round 17: Jack Buchanan scored his 1st try for the Wolfpack.
- Round 17: Gareth O'Brien kicked his 1st goal for the Wolfpack.
- Round 18: Liam Kay scored his 50th try and reached 200 points for the Wolfpack.
- Round 18: Blake Wallace scored his 25th try and reached 100 points for the Wolfpack.
- Round 19: Blake Wallace scored his 3rd hat-trick for the Wolfpack.
- Round 21: Blake Wallace scored his 4th hat-trick for the Wolfpack.
- Round 21: Ryan Brierley scored his 25th try for the Wolfpack.
- Round 23: Ashton Sims scored his 1st try for the Wolfpack.
- Qualifier 2: Mason Caton-Brown made his debut for the Wolfpack.
- Qualifier 2: Adam Sidlow made his 50th appearance for the Wolfpack.
- Qualifier 3: Mason Caton-Brown scored his 1st try for the Wolfpack.
- Qualifier 5: Gareth O'Brien kicked his 1st drop goal for the Wolfpack.
