= 2011 St Helens R.F.C. season =

- Super League XIV Rank: 3rd
- Play-off result: -
- Challenge Cup: Fourth round
- 2011 record: Wins: 8; draws: 2; losses: 3
- Points scored: For: 376; against: 250

Team information
- Chairman: Eamonn McManus
- Head coach: Royce Simmons
- Captain: Paul Wellens and James Graham
- Stadium: Stobart Stadium
- Avg. attendance: -
- High attendance: -

Top scorers
- Tries: Jamie Foster (25)
- Goals: Jamie Foster (151)
- Points: Jamie Foster (402)
Home colours
← 2010	List of seasons	2012 →

The 2011 St Helens R.F.C. season was the club's 137th in their history; their 116th in rugby league. They were in contention for the Super League title (with this also being their 16th consecutive year in Super League) as well as the 110th edition of the Challenge Cup and, as announced in May 2011, the new Rugby League 9s tournament, to take place across June. The 2011 season was also the clubs' first since unofficially rebranding as Saints RL, following on from their move away from their home of 120 years, Knowsley Road, to relocate to Widnes, Cheshire and the Halton Stadium, which they shared with Widnes Vikings. This was Australian Royce Simmons first year as head coach of the club, taking over from fellow Australian Mick Potter, who had two years in charge. The position of club captain at St Helens was shared by Paul Wellens and James Graham, following the retirement of club legend Keiron Cunningham at the end of the 2010 season. They began their season by taking on bitter rivals Wigan Warriors at the Magic Weekend, in a rerun of their defeat at the 2010 Super League Grand Final, a game that ended in a 16–16 draw.

== Pre-season ==
St Helens ended 2010 with yet another Grand Final defeat, their fourth in a row, to bitter rivals Wigan. It was evident that the personnel at the club, combined with the suitability of Mick Potter's position had become surplus to requirements at St Helens, and widespread changes took place. Potter announced mid-2010 that he would be leaving for Bradford Bulls, his replacement, Royce Simmons; someone who had worked under Tim Sheens for many years at Wests Tigers and with the Australian national side. The very fact that St Helens had been, in many fans' eyes 'reduced' to looking for assistant coaches in the NRL drew a little bit of criticism, but overall, the feeling was positive over Simmons' appointment. The coach would not be the only change either. Club legend Keiron Cunningham retired from playing at the age of 33, after 16 years of paying first team rugby for St Helens, with centre Matt Gidley doing likewise, and returning to Australia. A number of others were to leave too; a combination of age and not being good enough for squad selection under Simmons costing the St Helens careers of 12 of the 2010 squad, most notably, arguably, Maurie Fa'asavalu, who switched codes with Harlequins. The influx was far fewer than the outgoing numbers during the transfer period, with only three names coming into the squad for 2011 from other clubs; these being prop Josh Perry, England centre Michael Shenton, and fellow England cap and prop Louie McCarthy-Scarsbrook, from Manly-Warringah Sea Eagles, Castleford Tigers and Harlequins respectively. There were also four new faces in the first team by means of the reserve and academy system at St Helens. Pre-season fixtures announced included a game against Huddersfield Giants at the Halton Stadium on 29 January and the Karalius Cup game against Widnes, again at the Stobart, on the 23rd.

== Sponsors ==
St Helens are sponsored in the main by Medicash, after previously being sponsored by both Frontline and the Liverpool-based health care company on the home and away jerseys respectively. However, Medicash took over compete sponsorship of both the away and home strips for 2011. The jerseys themselves will are manufactured by ISC, after 7 years with Puma. St Helens also welcomed Alexandra Business Park and Ruskin Leisure Park as partners for the 2011 season.

Below is a list of St Helens sponsors and partners for 2011:

2011 St Helens RLFC sponsors
Capacity	Name
Kit manufacturer	ISC
Stadium sponsors	Stobart
Home jersey front sponsor	Medicash
Shorts sponsor	Tudor North West
Back panel sponsor	Hattons Solicitors
Collar sponsor	Live'smart
Front panel sponsors	Alexandra Business Park
Arm sponsor	James Edward Land Rover
Arm sponsor	Knowsley Safari Park
Overseas travel partners	Emirates
Travel partners	Arriva
Travel partners	Hattons Travel
Website partners	EMS Internet
Stadium partners	Science in Sport
Stadium partners	Macmillan Cancer Support
Stadium partners	Playing for Success
Stadium partners	Ruskin Leisure Limited
Ball providers	Steeden
League partners	engage Mutual

== 2011 transfers ==
=== In ===
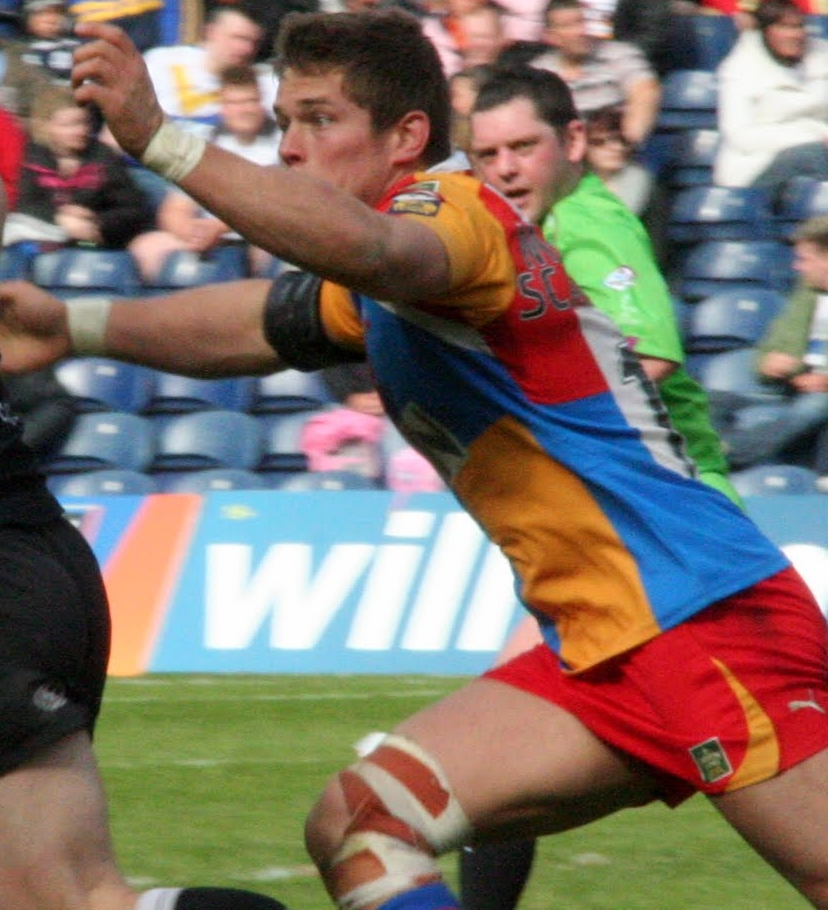
Louie McCarthy-Scarsbrook in action for Harlequins in 2010

In
Player	Signed from	When signed
Josh Perry	Manly-Warringah Sea Eagles	August 2010
Louie McCarthy-Scarsbrook	Harlequins RL	September 2010
Michael Shenton	Castleford Tigers	October 2010
Carl Forster	Promoted from Academy	November 2010
Scott Hale	Promoted from Academy	November 2010
Thomas Makinson	Promoted from Academy	November 2010
Nathan Ashe	Promoted from Academy	November 2010
Josh Jones	Promoted from Academy	April 2011
Joe Greenwood	Promoted from Academy	April 2011
Warren Thompson	Promoted from Academy	April 2011
Jordan Hand	Promoted from Academy	May 2011

Mid-season signings for 2012
Player	Signed from	When Signed
Lance Hohaia	New Zealand Warriors	April 2011
Anthony Laffranchi	Gold Coast Titans	May 2011
Mark Flanagan	Wests Tigers	July 2011

=== Out ===
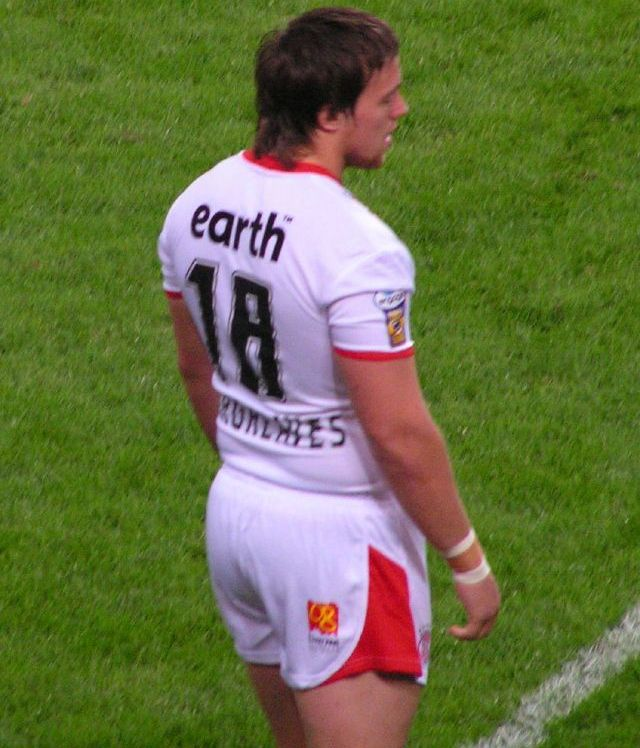
Bryn Hargreaves left Saints for Bradford

Out
Player	Signed for	When left
Keiron Cunningham	Retired	October 2010
Matt Gidley	Retired	October 2010
Nick Fozzard	Castleford Tigers	October 2010
Bryn Hargreaves	Bradford Bulls	October 2010
Chris Dean	Wakefield Trinity Wildcats	December 2010
Maurie Fa'asavalu	Code switch (Harlequin F.C.)	October 2010
Jacob Emmitt	Castleford Tigers	October 2010
Matty Smith	Salford City Reds	October 2010
Steve Tyrer	Widnes Vikings	October 2010
Jamie Ellis	Leigh Centurions	November 2010
Jack Bradbury	Oldham R.L.F.C.	November 2010
Andy Yates	Hunslet Hawks	November 2010
Gareth Frodsham	Widnes Vikings (dual-registration)	November 2010
Tom Armstrong	Leigh Centurions (dual-registration)	November 2010

Mid-season losses for 2012
Player	Signed for	When left
Kyle Eastmond	Code switch (Bath Rugby)	November 2011
James Graham	Canterbury-Bankstown Bulldogs	November 2011

== Fixtures and results ==
=== Friendlies ===
==== Karalius Cup ====
Widnes Vikings 20-52 St Helens

Sunday 24 January 2011

Widnes Vikings
Tries: Grady,
Haggerty,
Thackeray,
M. Gardner

Goals: Craven (0/1)
Tyrer (2/3)

20–52
(Report)

St. Helens
Tries: Graham (2),
McCarthy-Scarsbrook,
Soliola,
A. Gardner,
Roby,
Armstrong,
Dixon,
Wheeler,
Penalty Try

Goals: Foster (6/10)

Halton Stadium, Widnes
Attendance: 3,755
Referee: Robert Hicks

==== 29 January ====
St Helens 12-36 Huddersfield Giants

Monday 7 February 2011

St. Helens
Tries: Roby (2),
Wheeler

Goals: Wheeler (0/2)
Foster (0/1)

12–36
(Report)

Huddersfield Giants
Tries: Hodgson,
Brown,
Brough,
Crabtree,
Lunt,
Lawrence

Goals: Brough (6/6)

Halton Stadium, Widnes
Attendance: 1,258
Referee: Steve Ganson

=== Super League XVI ===
==== Magic Weekend ====
St Helens 16-16 Wigan Warriors

St Helens produced a characteristic fightback in the last 15 minutes to snatch an unlikely draw against a well-drilled, energetic Wigan side. After tries from Ryan Hoffman, Harrison Hansen and George Carmont combined with two disallowed Saints efforts from James Roby and Michael Shenton, the game looked dead and buried at 16–0 to Wigan; with the auld enemy on top in terms of field position, defense, kicking and handling. However, Saints forged a comeback through a rare missed tackle from an otherwise outstanding Wigan defense when Roby put Jon Wilkin away under the posts, bettered by the boot of Jamie Foster. The energy levels visibly went up, and Tony Puletua powered through the Wigan line and somehow grounded the ball with a mass of bodies surrounding him, again Foster good with the goal. It took Saints another five minutes-a period in which Wigan looked threatening once more-to get their draw, with a forward-looking pass from Jonny Lomax finding Francis Meli in space out on the touchline, Foster about three yards wide with what would have been the game clinching kick. Wigan's Sam Tomkins and Saints scrum-half Kyle Eastmond exchanged failed drop-goal attempts late on as both sides settled on a point each in the game of the day at the Magic Weekend.

Saturday 12 February 2011

St. Helens
Tries: Wilkin,
Puletua,
Meli

Goals: Foster (2/3)

16–16
(Report)

Wigan Warriors
Tries: Hoffman,
Hansen,
Carmont

Goals: Deacon (1/1), S. Tomkins (1/2)

Millennium Stadium, Cardiff
Attendance: 30,891
Referee: Richard Silverwood

==== Round 2 ====
Salford City Reds 22-56 St Helens

St Helens created for the first time this season their most attractive brand of football; free-flowing and point scoring. However, the job was done after an hour, and they seemed to take their foot of the gas-a trait they may not wish to fall into permanently. Saints started sharply against an out of sorts Salford side coming off the back of a heavy defeat to Crusaders the week previous, with tries from Chris Flannery and the first of two from Kyle Eastmond. Salford hit back through Luke Patten, but it took them to the second half to post more points; a spell in which St Helens totally dominated and scored another five tries of their own. James Roby in a brilliant performance, Francis Meli, Jonny Lomax and Ade Gardner all crossed to give Saints a 38–6 lead at the break. The second half started in bizarre fashion, with two tries in the first minute from either side; for Salford Ashley Gibson, for St Helens, Lee Gaskell. Paul Clough and Michael Shenton completed the scoring for Saints, before Stefan Ratchford and Jodie Broughton made the scoreline a little more respectable for the Reds.

Friday 18 February 2011

Salford City Reds
Tries: Patten,
Gibson,
Ratchford,
Broughton

Goals: Holdsworth (3/4)

22–56
(Report)

St Helens R.F.C.
Tries: Flannery,
Eastmond (2),
Roby,
Meli,
Lomax,
Gardner,
Gaskell,
Clough,
Shenton

Goals: Foster (8/10)

The Willows, Salford
Attendance: 5,929
Referee: Robert Hicks

==== Round 3 ====
St Helens 18-25 Warrington Wolves

For the first time in 22 games, Warrington won against St Helens in Super League on a miserable night, both meteorically and psychologically for St Helens, at the Stobart Stadium. It was also Warrington's first ever win in Super League away from home, and was never really in doubt from the moment Lee Briers crossed in the second minute, a score which was bettered by Richie Myler and another from the stand-off before half-time, all of which were converted by Brett Hodgson to give the Wolves an 18-0 half time advantage. Warrington continued to pile on the pressure against an out of sorts Saints side, when Louis Anderson finished from a Lee Gaskell error, Hodgson again with the goal for 24–0. With around ten minutes to play, Michael Shenton crossed for Saints to give them the slightest glimmer of hope; a hope crushed by a Briers field goal that effectively meant Saints had to score three times. Chris Flannery and Lee Gaskell added late scores to give the score an account of respectability, but the performance showed that plenty of defensive work needs to be done for Saints' trophy charge this season.

Friday 26 February 2011

St. Helens
Tries: Shenton,
Flannery,
Gaskell

Goals: Lomax (1/1),
Foster (2/2)

18–25
(Report)

Warrington Wolves
Tries: Briers (2),
Myler,
Anderson

Goals: Hodgson (4/4)
Drop Goals: Briers

Halton Stadium, Widnes
Attendance: 10,514
Referee: Phil Bentham

==== Round 4 ====
Catalans Dragons 16-22 St Helens

Bouncing back from their first defeat at home to Warrington in Super League, St Helens produced the defensive grit that was all too absent the week previous against a big Dragons pack. Saints opened the scoring with a free-flowing move finished off by Chris Flannery, bettered by the boot of Kyle Eastmond. Despite massive Catalans' pressure, five minutes later Ade Gardner found the line at the corner after good work by Eastmond, Paul Wellens and Michael Shenton, Eastmond this time wide with the kick at goal. The Dragons pressure then duly paid off, with Setaimata Sa latching on to a Scott Dureau kick, Dureau missing with the conversion but Saints nudged further in front with James Graham getting his first of the season, backing Wellens up well to dot down under the posts, Eastmond with a simple conversion. After the break, the free flowing football Saints seemed to be clicking with for arguably the first time this season continued with Michael Shenton scoring in the right-hand corner, Eastmond again missing with the goal kick. Catalans brought the game back within touching distance with a Steve Menzies try and Dureau goal, but Saints edged further in front with an Eastmond penalty, followed by a consolation try and goal from Dureau that made the final score 22–16 to Saints.

Saturday 5 March 2011

Catalans Dragons
Tries: Sa,
Menzies,
Dureau

Goals: Dureau (2/3)

16–22
(Report)

St Helens R.F.C.
Tries: Flannery,
Graham,
Gardner,
Shenton

Goals: Eastmond (3/5)

Stade Gilbert Brutus, Perpignan, France
Attendance: 7,095
Referee: Thierry Alibert

==== Round 5 ====
St Helens 16-27 Harlequins

St Helens were simply out classed, out enthused and out played by a flying Quins side, who produced a first half of rugby similar to the days of Saints dominance in the late 1990s/early 2000s. Racing into a 20–0 lead at the break thanks to tries from Luke Dorn, Karl Pryce and Tony Clubb, with Luke Gale adding four goals, Saints were never in the contest, producing mistakes and at best very flat rugby, compared to the very lively Quins. It took until the 48th minute for Saints to break their duck, with Francis Meli latching onto a cut-out ball from Lee Gaskell. An unlikely, and in truth undeserved comeback was on the cards when captain James Graham powered over, with Kyle Eastmond converting to bring Saints back within two scores. However these hopes were soon dashed when, from the kick-off, Nick Kouparitsas intercepted a James Roby pass; a feat characteristic of the sloppiness of St Helens and the sharpness of the Londoners continuous throughout the game. Five minutes from time, Gale added a drop-goal to wrap up the points before Roby grabbed a last minute consolation after an offload from Tony Puletua. Either the unpredictability of the competition, or the erratic form of the Saints was to blame here; only time would tell as the competition progressed.

Friday 11 March 2011

St. Helens
Tries: Meli,
Graham,
Roby

Goals: Eastmond (1/2),
Foster (1/1)

16–27
(Report)

Harlequins
Tries: Dorn,
Pryce,
Clubb,
Kouparitsas

Goals: Gale (5/5)
Drop Goals: Gale

Halton Stadium, Widnes
Attendance: 6,050
Referee: Gareth Hewer

==== Round 6 ====
Leeds Rhinos 16–30 St Helens

The unpredictability of Saints this season was once again on show as they beat a Leeds side in a similar man-power situation to Saints. Added to the significance of the win was that scrum-half Kyle Eastmond was internally suspended for a serious breach of club discipline, so inexperienced halves Lee Gaskell and Jonny Lomax had to step up to the fore. The game started in ferocious style, both defences repelling each other, before Jamie Foster squeezed in at the left corner and converted his own try to give Saints the lead on 27 minutes. Leeds hit back five minutes before the break when Ryan hall scored, Kevin Sinfield kicking the goal for 6–6 at the break. It was Leeds who broke the second half deadlock with a very controversial try. The ball from Kallum Watkins to eventual scorer Zak Hardaker appeared to go yards forward, but, after reference to the video referee, the try, which came about form fine handling from Hardaker, was awarded. This decision only spurred Saints on, and, after a towering bomb from Gaskell, Michael Shenton dotted down, Foster again kicking the two for 12–10. The lead again switched hands when Paul McShane nudged over from dummy-half, Sinfield making it 16–12, but St Helens managed to find something that had seemingly escaped them hitherto; heart. Francis Meli barged past Watkins after a good ball from Scott Moore, before Paul Wellens timed his running line to perfection to latch onto a Gaskell pass. Foster converted both for 24–16. At this point the points were rapped up, despite Leeds' best efforts in reply. But the best, most exhilarating piece of football was still to come, when Meli flicked the ball out to the left wing, Foster caught the ball behind his back, switched it between his hands to score in the tightest of circumstances. To make matters better and put the proverbial icing on the cake of victory for Saints, Foster maintained his perfect kicking display with another goal from the touchline.

Saturday 19 March 2011

Leeds Rhinos
Tries: Hall,
Hardaker,
McShane

Goals: Sinfield (2/3)

16–30
(Report)

St Helens R.F.C.
Tries: Foster (2),
Shenton,
Meli,
Wellens

Goals: Foster (5/5)

Headingley, Leeds
Attendance: 16,034
Referee: Richard Silverwood

==== Round 7 ====
St Helens 28-16 Bradford Bulls

For the first time in the season, St Helens showed some signs of consistency, with a comfortable win over a plucky Bradford outfit. It was the Bulls who made the better start though, with Shaun Ainscough latching onto a Marc Herbert kick, Patrick Ah van converting. Saints hit back in controversial fashion, with Paul Wellens' forward-looking pass falling into the arms of Jamie Foster, who squeezed in at the left-hand corner. Foster missed the goal, but made no mistake after Wellens crashed over. Three tries shared between Wellens, Chris Flannery and Foster in a blistering spell in which Paul Sykes was sin-binned effectively sealed the result, before Ah Van and Ainscough grabbed consolation efforts for the Bulls when Saints were down to 11 men through yellow cards.

25 March 2011

St. Helens
Tries: Foster (2),
Wellens (2),
Flannery

Goals: Foster (4/6)

28–16
(Report)

Bradford Bulls
Tries: Ainscough (2),
Ah Van

Goals: Ah Van (2/3)

Halton Stadium, Widnes
Attendance: 7,676
Referee: Richard Silverwood

==== Round 8 ====
St Helens 34-16 Hull Kingston Rovers

Saints extended their winning run to three games with a routine win over Hull KR. It was the Rovers who started the better though, with Kris Welham scoring on 10 minutes. However, the Saints hit back in typical fashion, Sia Soliola getting his first try for the club. In similar style, Louie McCarthy-Scarsbrook scored his first for the club since his winter move from Harlequins, before scoring an almost carbon copy of his first minutes later, with Jamie Foster's boot giving St Helens an 18–6 advantage. And Ade Gardner's break gave Paul Wellens the opportunity to scorch in unopposed; 24–6 at half time. Foster himself, so often the points machine with the boot, got on the try list with his fifth in three games, missing the conversion. On his 200th appearance, James Graham crashed over, before consolation efforts from the Robins from Welham and Jake Webster gave the scoreline a somewhat undeserved credibility.

1 April 2011

St. Helens
Tries: Soliola,
McCarthy-Scarsbrook (2),
Wellens,
Foster,
Graham

Goals: Foster (5/6)

34–16
(Report)

Hull Kingston Rovers
Tries: Welham (2),
Webster

Goals: Hall (2/3)

Halton Stadium, Widnes
Attendance: 7,740
Referee: Ben Thaler

==== Round 9 ====
Crusaders 18-34 St Helens

Although St Helens' fantastic form continued in this win over the 'Cru', Saints were guilty of taking their foot off the gas after half-time, and not capitalising on a scrappy display for the Welsh outfit in the second period. Young half-back combination Jonny Lomax and Lee Gaskell, assisted by the on-fire James Roby sent Saints on their way, with Jamie Foster's kicking giving them a 12–0 lead early on. After a brief spell of Crusaders pressure, Paul Wellens took a grubber from Gaskell to score Saints' third of the evening, before Gareth Thomas gave Crusaders a bit of hope. However, Saints wrapped up the win before half time, with two further tries, Roby himself and Ade Gardner crossing to give St Helens a 30–6 lead at the break. The impressive Tony Martin and Lloyd White gave Crusaders a sight at a fightback but Gardner's second on the full-time siren ensured the win for Saints.

Friday 8 April 2011

Crusaders Rugby League
Tries: Thomas,
Martin,
White

Goals: Schifcofske (1/1),
Witt (2/2)

18–34
(Report)

St Helens R.F.C.
Tries: Lomax,
Gaskell,
Wellens,
Roby,
Gardner (2)

Goals: Foster (5/6)

Racecourse Ground, Wrexham
Attendance: 4,002
Referee: Robert Hicks

==== Round 10 ====
St Helens 52-6 Wakefield Trinity Wildcats

St Helens produced their most dominant game of the season, with a resounding 9-try-to-1 win over Wakefield. The game started off in tight fashion, with Saints' pressure being cancelled out by some rugged if plucky Wildcats defence. However, the deadlock was broken on 17 minutes, with Paul Wellens' long ball finding the in-form Jamie Foster out wide who crossed and scored a goal. Jonny Lomax jinked his way through before Jon Wilkin found a gaping hole in the Wakefield defence to set up Foster, who cantered over for his second, and the floodgates were well and truly open. Michael Shenton crossed before half time, before Chris Dean, a former Saints player sped 60 meters on an intercept to give Wakefield a glimmer of hope. However, Ade Gardner went over 7 minutes later, and tries from Gary Wheeler, Wellens, Tony Puletua and Tom Makinson completed the rout.

15 April 2011

St. Helens
Tries: Foster (2),
Lomax,
Shenton,
Gardner,
Wheeler,
Wellens,
Puletua,
Makinson

Goals: Foster (8/9)

52–6
(Report)

Wakefield Trinity Wildcats
Tries: Dean

Goals: Griffin (1/1)

Halton Stadium, Widnes
Attendance: 7,003
Referee: Steve Ganson

==== Round 11 ====
Wigan Warriors 28-24 St Helens

St Helens' run came to an end in somewhat unfair circumstances after a classic with rivals Wigan. An injury ravaged Saints led 10-0 after 35 minutes through Michael Shenton and Jamie Foster scores. But Wigan hit back close to half-time, with Josh Charnley crossing in the right corner. Tries from Pat Richards (2) and another from Charnley put Wigan ahead for the first time in the game as they sought to dominate. And at 22–10, a youthful Saints side could have been forgiven for giving up, but in typical fashion, they hit back quickly, with Foster's second and Tom Makinson getting his second try in as many games dragging them back on terms. And Saints looked to have won the game, with Foster's boot from a thirty-yard penalty giving them a 24–22 lead with 7 minutes to play. However, Wigan won it through a last minute try from Liam Farrell, after a great delayed pass from Paul Deacon. An undeserved defeat, but a heartening display gave the game some credibility from Saints' perspective.

Friday 22 April 2011

Wigan Warriors
Tries: Charnley (2),
Richards (2),
Farrell

Goals: Richards (4/5)

28–24
(Report)

St Helens R.F.C.
Tries: Shenton,
Foster,
Makinson

Goals: Foster (4/5)

DW Stadium, Wigan
Attendance: 24,057
Referee: Richard Silverwood

==== Round 12 ====
St Helens 22-20 Castleford Tigers

25 April 2011

St. Helens
Tries: Armstrong (2),
Gardner,
Meli

Goals: Foster (3/4)

22–20
(Report)

Castleford Tigers
Tries: Jones,
Chase,
Thompson

Goals: Dixon (4/4)

Halton Stadium, Widnes
Attendance: 8,010
Referee: Phil Bentham

==== Round 13 ====
Hull F.C. 24-24 St Helens

Monday 2 May 2011

Hull F.C.
Tries: Yeaman (3),
Briscoe

Goals: Tickle (4/4)

24–24
(Report)

St Helens R.F.C.
Tries: Foster,
Roby,
Gardner,
Puletua

Goals: Foster (4/5)

KC Stadium, Kingston-upon-Hull
Attendance: 11,933
Referee: Steve Ganson

==== Round 14 ====
Huddersfield Giants 40-18 St Helens

Saturday 14 May 2011

Huddersfield Giants
Tries: Crabtree (2),
Brough,
Brown,
Lawrence,
Wardle,
Scott Grix

Goals: Brough (6/7)

40–18
(Report)

St Helens R.F.C.
Tries: McCarthy-Scarsbrook,
Ashurst,
Gardner

Goals: Foster (3/3)

Galpharm Stadium, Huddersfield
Attendance: 7,843
Referee: Thierry Alibert

==== Round 15 ====
St Helens 28-12 Crusaders

==== Round 16 ====
St Helens 42-16 Leeds Rhinos

==== Round 17 ====
Bradford Bulls 14-14 St Helens

==== Round 18 ====
St Helens vs Wigan Warriors

==== Round 19 ====
Warrington Wolves vs St Helens

==== Round 20 ====
St Helens vs Hull

==== Round 21 ====
Wakefield Trinity Wildcats vs St Helens

==== Round 22 ====
St Helens vs Catalans Dragons

==== Round 23 ====
Castleford Tigers vs St Helens

==== Round 24 ====
St Helens vs Huddersfield Giants

==== Round 25 ====
Hull Kingston Rovers vs St Helens

==== Round 26 ====
St Helens vs Salford City Reds

==== Round 27 ====
Harlequins vs St Helens

=== 2011 Challenge Cup ===
==== Round 4 ====
St Helens 52-26 Sheffield Eagles

==== Round 5 ====
St Helens 70-0 Featherstone Rovers

==== Quarter finals ====
St Helens vs Hull Kingston Rovers

=== Rugby League 9s ===
==== Round 1 ====
St Helens 18-16 Cumbria

St Helens 12-26 Warrington Wolves

St Helens 28-15 Police

==== Round 2 ====
St Helens 12-22 Wigan Warriors

St Helens 24-14 Police

St Helens 20-18 Salford City Reds

==== Round 3 ====
St Helens vs Warrington Wolves

Wigan Warriors vs St Helens

St Helens vs Widnes Vikings

==== Round 4 ====
St Helens vs British Police

St Helens vs Huddersfield Giants

St Helens vs Widnes Vikings

== Table ==
Pos	Team	Pld	W	D	L	PF	PA	PD	Pts	Qualification
1	Warrington Wolves (L)	27	22	0	5	1072	401	+671	44	Play-offs
2	Wigan Warriors	27	20	3	4	852	432	+420	43	Play-offs
3	St Helens	27	17	3	7	782	515	+267	37	Play-offs
4	Huddersfield Giants	27	16	0	11	707	524	+183	32	Play-offs
5	Leeds Rhinos (C)	27	15	1	11	757	603	+154	31	Play-offs
6	Catalans Dragons	27	15	1	11	689	626	+63	31	Play-offs
7	Hull Kingston Rovers	27	14	0	13	713	692	+21	28	Play-offs
8	Hull F.C.	27	13	1	13	718	569	+149	27	Play-offs
9	Castleford Tigers	27	12	2	13	664	808	−144	26	
10	Bradford Bulls	27	9	2	16	570	826	−256	20	
11	Salford City Reds	27	10	0	17	542	809	−267	20	
12	Harlequins	27	6	1	20	524	951	−427	13	
13	Wakefield Trinity Wildcats	27	7	0	20	453	957	−504	10 (Note: Wakefield deducted 4 points for entering administration.)	
14	Crusaders	27	6	0	21	527	857	−330	8 (Note: Crusaders deducted 4 points for entering administration.)	

Source: rugbyleagueproject.org
Rules for classification: 1) Points; 2) Points difference; 3) Number of points scored;
(C) Champions; (L) League Leaders' Shield winners

== 2011 squad ==
2012 St Helens season
First team squad			Coaching staff
1 Paul Wellens (c) – FB; 2 Ade Gardner – WG; 3 Michael Shenton – CE; 4 Sia Soliola – SR, CE; 5 Francis Meli – WG, CE; 6 Lance Hohaia – SO, FB, SH; 7 Jonny Lomax – SO, FB, WG, SH; 8 Josh Perry – PR; 9 James Roby (vc) – HK, LF; 10; 11 Tony Puletua – SR, PR, LF; 12 Jon Wilkin – SR, SO; 13 Chris Flannery – LF, CE	14 Anthony Laffranchi – SR, LF; 15 Louie McCarthy-Scarsbrook – PR, SR; 16 Paul Clough – SR, PR; 17 Gary Wheeler – CE, SO; 18; 19 Andrew Dixon – LF; 20 Lee Gaskell – SO; 21 Shaun Magennis – SR; 22 Jamie Foster – WG (gk); 23; 24 Tom Armstrong – WG, CE; 25 Lee Gaskell – SO; 26 Carl Forster – SR	27 Nathan Ashe – FB, SO; 28 Tommy Makinson – FB, CE; 29 Scott Hale – SR; 30 Josh Jones – CE; 32 Joe Greenwood – PR; 33 Warren Thompson – SR; 34 Jordan Hand – PR; 35 Danny Jones – SR	Head coach: Royce Simmons; Assistant coaches: Kieron Purtill; Mike Rush (Performance manager); Legend: (c) Captain(s); (vc) Vice-captain(s); (gk) Goal kicker; Injured; Updated: 18 September 2011; Source(s): St Helens 1st team squad,
