= 2012 St Helens R.F.C. season =

Rugby league team season

- Super League XVII Rank: 3rd
- Challenge Cup: Quarter-finals
← 2011	2013 →

In the 2012 rugby league season, St Helens competed in Super League XVII and the 2012 Challenge Cup.

== Results ==
=== Pre-season friendlies ===
W Win D Draw L Loss

Friendly match results
Date	Versus	H/A	Venue	Result	Score	Tries	Goals	Attendance	Report
3 February	Widnes Vikings	A	Langtree Park	W	42–24			11,438	

=== Super League ===
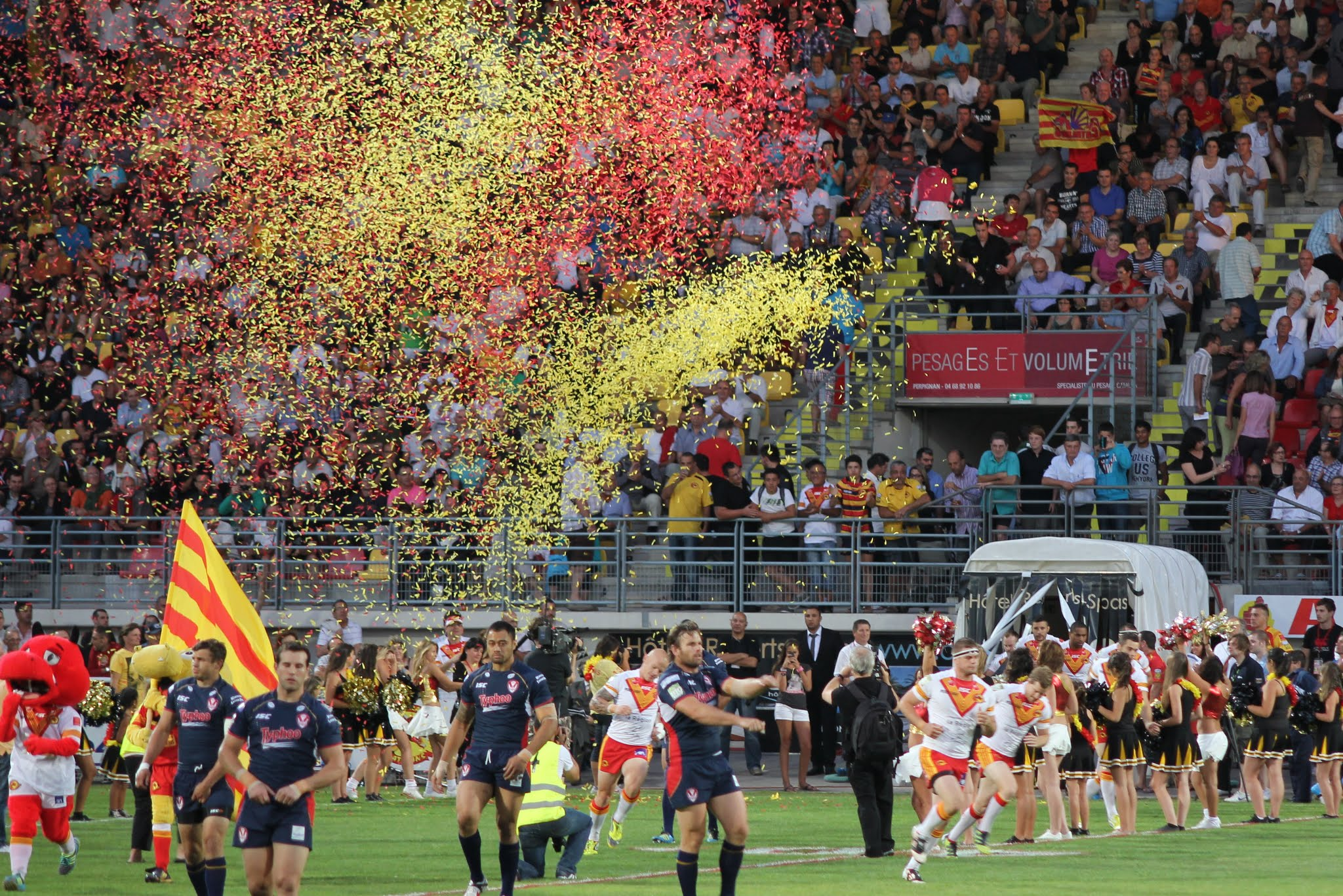
Pre-match away to Catalans Dragons

==== League table ====
Super League XVII
Pos	Team	Pld	W	D	L	PF	PA	PD	Pts	Qualification
1	Wigan Warriors (L)	27	21	0	6	994	449	+545	42	Play-offs
2	Warrington Wolves	27	20	1	6	909	539	+370	41	Play-offs
3	St Helens	27	17	2	8	795	480	+315	36	Play-offs
4	Catalans Dragons	27	18	0	9	812	611	+201	36	Play-offs
5	Leeds Rhinos (C)	27	16	0	11	823	662	+161	32	Play-offs
6	Hull F.C.	27	15	2	10	696	621	+75	32	Play-offs
7	Huddersfield Giants	27	14	0	13	699	664	+35	28	Play-offs
8	Wakefield Trinity Wildcats	27	13	0	14	633	764	−131	26	Play-offs
9	Bradford Bulls	27	14	1	12	633	756	−123	23 (Note: Bradford Bulls deducted 6 points on 25 July 2012 for entering administration)	
10	Hull Kingston Rovers	27	10	1	16	753	729	+24	21	
11	Salford City Reds	27	8	1	18	618	844	−226	17	
12	London Broncos	27	7	0	20	588	890	−302	14	
13	Castleford Tigers	27	6	0	21	554	948	−394	12	
14	Widnes Vikings	27	6	0	21	532	1082	−550	12	

Source: superleague.co.uk and BBC Sport.
Rules for classification: 1st on competition points; 2nd on match points difference.
Competition points: for win = 2; for draw = 1; for loss = 0.
(C) Champions; (L) League Leaders' Shield Winners

==== Super League results ====
W Win D Draw L Loss

Super League results
Date	Round	Versus	H/A	Venue	Result	Score	Tries	Goals	Attendance	Report
4 February	1	London Broncos	A	The Stoop	W	34–24			4,924	RLP
10 February	2	Salford City Reds	H	Langtree Park	W	38–10			15,547	RLP
19 February	3	Hull Kingston Rovers	A	Craven Park	D	36–36			7,610	RLP
24 February	4	Catalans Dragons	H	Langtree Park	L	32–34			13,108	RLP
4 March	5	Huddersfield Giants	A	Galpharm Stadium	L	16–17			9,194	RLP
9 March	6	Hull F.C.	H	Langtree Park	L	10–22			14,875	RLP
17 March	7	Bradford Bulls	A	Odsal Stadium	L	8–12			11,360	RLP
25 March	8	Leeds Rhinos	H	Langtree Park	W	46–6			15,199	RLP
30 March	9	Warrington Wolves	A	Halliwell Jones Stadium	W	28–16			15,000	RLP
6 April	10	Wigan Warriors	H	Langtree Park	L	10–28			17,980	RLP
9 April	11	Castleford Tigers	A	PROBIZ Coliseum	W	18–12			6,492	RLP
20 April	12	Widnes Vikings	H	Langtree Park	W	62–0			14,253	RLP
4 May	13	Wakefield Trinity Wildcats	H	Langtree Park	W	38–12			13,177	RLP
21 May	14	Leeds Rhinos	A	Headingley Stadium	W	31–18			15,343	RLP
27 May	15	Wigan Warriors	N	City of Manchester Stadium	L	16–42			32,953	RLP
3 June	16	Hull F.C.	A	KC Stadium	D	18–18			11,727	RLP
8 June	17	Bradford Bulls	H	Langtree Park	W	54–0			13,025	RLP
22 June	18	Salford City Reds	A	Salford City Stadium	W	32–10			5,447	RLP
29 June	19	Hull Kingston Rovers	H	Langtree Park	W	34–28			12,435	RLP
8 July	20	Widnes Vikings	A	Stobart Stadium	W	24–23			7,023	RLP
20 July	21	Catalans Dragons	A	Stade Gilbert Brutus	W	20–15			10,387	RLP
29 July	22	Huddersfield Giants	H	Langtree Park	W	46–12			12,329	RLP
6 August	23	Warrington Wolves	H	Langtree Park	L	12–22			15,728	RLP
12 August	24	Wakefield Trinity Wildcats	A	Rapid Solicitors Stadium	L	32–33			7,876	RLP
17 August	25	Castleford Tigers	H	Langtree Park	W	44–12			12,224	RLP
31 August	26	London Broncos	H	Langtree Park	W	30–0			13,262	RLP
7 September	27	Wigan Warriors	A	DW Stadium	W	26–18			21,522	RLP

==== Play-offs ====
Play-off results
Date	Round	Versus	H/A	Venue	Result	Score	Tries	Goals	Attendance	Report
15 September	Qualifying play-offs	Warrington Wolves	A	Halliwell Jones Stadium	W	28–6			10,190	RLP
29 September	Qualifying Semi-finals	Warrington Wolves	H	Langtree Park	L	18–36			12,715	RLP

===== Team bracket =====
Qualifying/Elimination playoffs
1	Wigan Warriors	46
4	Catalans Dragons	6
5	Leeds Rhinos	42
8	Wakefield Trinity Wildcats	20
6	Hull F.C.	46
7	Huddersfield Giants	10
2	Warrington Wolves	6
3	St Helens	28

Preliminary semifinals
Catalans Dragons	20
Leeds Rhinos	27
Hull F.C.	12
Warrington Wolves	24

Qualifying semifinals
Wigan selected Leeds
Wigan Warriors	12
Leeds Rhinos	13
St Helens	18
Warrington Wolves	36

Grand Final
6 October, Old Trafford
Leeds Rhinos	26
Warrington Wolves	18

Week 1. Qualifying/Elimination play-offs: Fixtures decided by regular reason finishing positions. Higher ranked teams play lower ranked teams. Higher ranked teams receive home ground advantage.
Week 2. Preliminary semi-finals: Fixtures decided by regular season finishing positions. Higher ranked teams play lower ranked teams. Higher ranked teams receive home ground advantage.
Week 3. Qualifying semi-finals: Winners of Qualifying play-offs play winners of Qualifying semi-finals. Fixtures decided by club call. Winners of Qualifying play-offs receive home ground advantage.

Source:Rugby League Project

=== Challenge Cup ===
W Win L Loss

Challenge Cup results
Date	Round	Versus	H/A	Venue	Result	Score	Tries	Goals	Attendance	Report
14 April	4	Widnes Vikings	A	Stobart Stadium	W	40–38			3,069	RLP
27 April	5	Oldham	H	Langtree Park	W	76–0			5,746	RLP
12 May	Quarter-final	Wigan Warriors	A	DW Stadium	L	4–18			12,864	RLP
