= Jack Buchanan (rugby league) =

Australian rugby league footballer

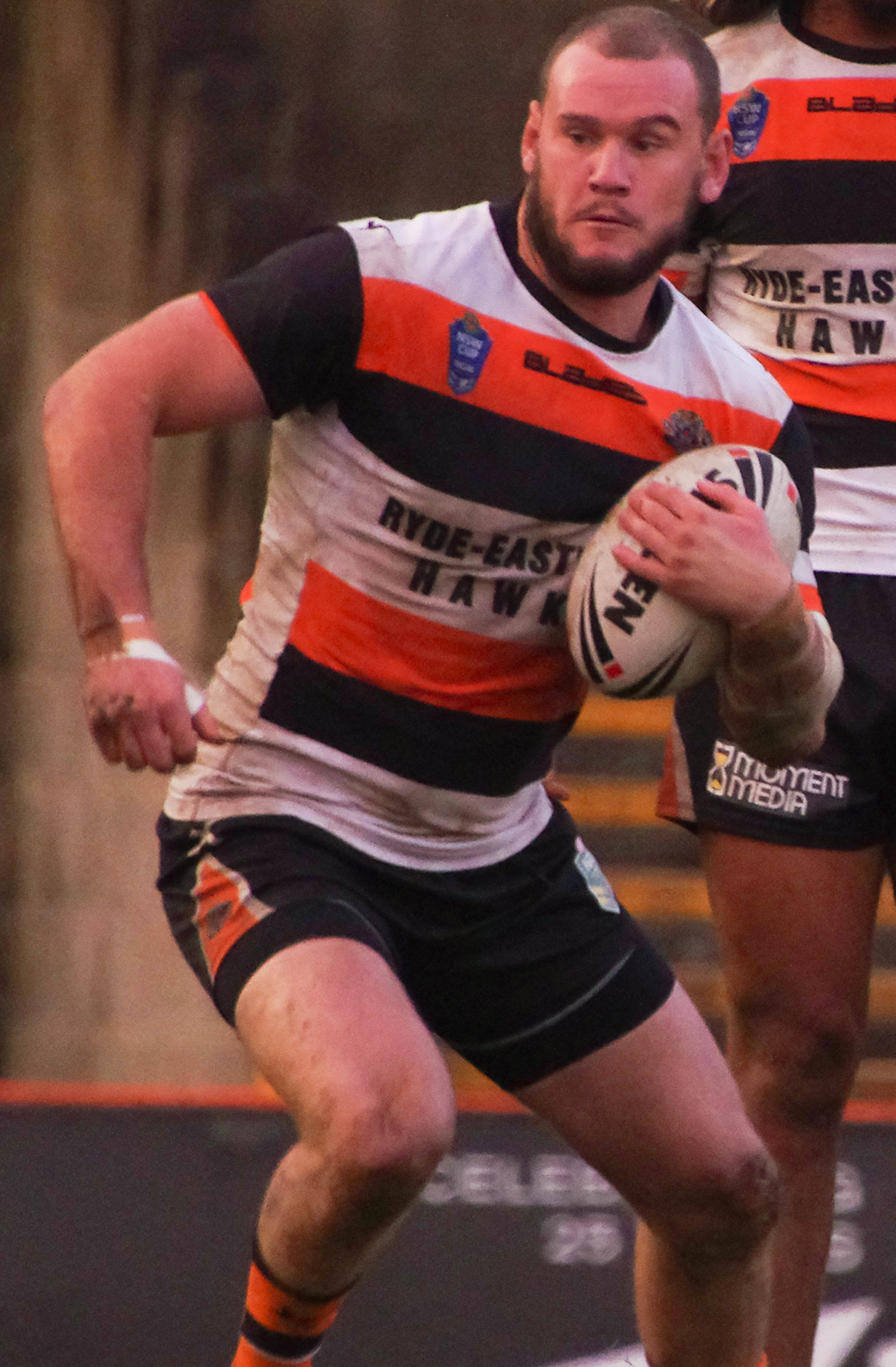

Personal information
- Born: 10 April 1992 (age 34) Culburra Beach, New South Wales, Australia
- Height: 193 cm (6 ft 4 in)
- Weight: 107 kg (16 st 12 lb)

Playing information
- Position: Prop
Club
| Years | Team | Pld | T | G | FG | P |
|---|---|---|---|---|---|---|
| 2013–16 | Wests Tigers | 41 | 1 | 0 | 0 | 4 |
| 2016–17 | Widnes Vikings | 40 | 3 | 0 | 0 | 12 |
| 2018 | Toronto Wolfpack | 29 | 2 | 0 | 0 | 8 |
| | Total | 110 | 6 | 0 | 0 | 24 |
- Source: As of 9 October 2018

Jack Buchanan (born 10 April 1992) is an Australian professional rugby league footballer who plays as a prop for the Burleigh Bears in the Queensland Cup.

He previously played for the Wests Tigers in the NRL, the Widnes Vikings in the Super League and the Toronto Wolfpack in the Championship.

== Playing career ==
Born in Culburra Beach, New South Wales, Australia, Buchanan played his earliest football for the Culburra Dolphins before joining Canterbury's representative teams as a teenager. "I was doing 2½-hour one-way trips to the Bulldogs in Harold Matthews and SG Ball. Five hours all round, about five days a week. That would have been about three years," Buchanan later said.

Buchanan was later signed by the St. George Illawarra Dragons. He played for the Dragons' NYC team in 2011 and 2012, scoring 3 tries in 46 games. In 2012, he was statistically one of the competition's top ten players in hit-ups, metres gained, and tackles made. At the end of the season, he signed a 3-year contract with the Wests Tigers.

In Round 1 of the 2013 NRL season Buchanan made his NRL debut for the Tigers against the Newcastle Knights. He was the youngest starting prop in the competition. With injuries to props Keith Galloway and Aaron Woods, Buchanan missed only one game throughout the season, averaging 26 tackles per game. He was also one of the club leaders in support runs. Coach Mick Potter said of Buchanan's first year, "When Jack came across here, he really was a big kid that was still a bit skinny. Getting some weight on him was key. He probably won’t be fully developed for three more years but he is certainly one to keep your eye on."

With the arrival of props Martin Taupau and James Gavet, Buchanan made just 4 appearances from the bench in 2014.

Buchanan played in 12 games in 2015, again all as a reserve. At the end of the season, he re-signed for a further year.

On 11 May 2016, Buchanan joined the Widnes Vikings in the Super League effective immediately on a contract to the end of 2017, after being released from his Tigers contract.

== Representative career ==
In 2009, Buchanan played for the New South Wales U17's team.
