= Ryan Brierley =

Scotland international rugby league footballer

Ryan "Kes" Brierley
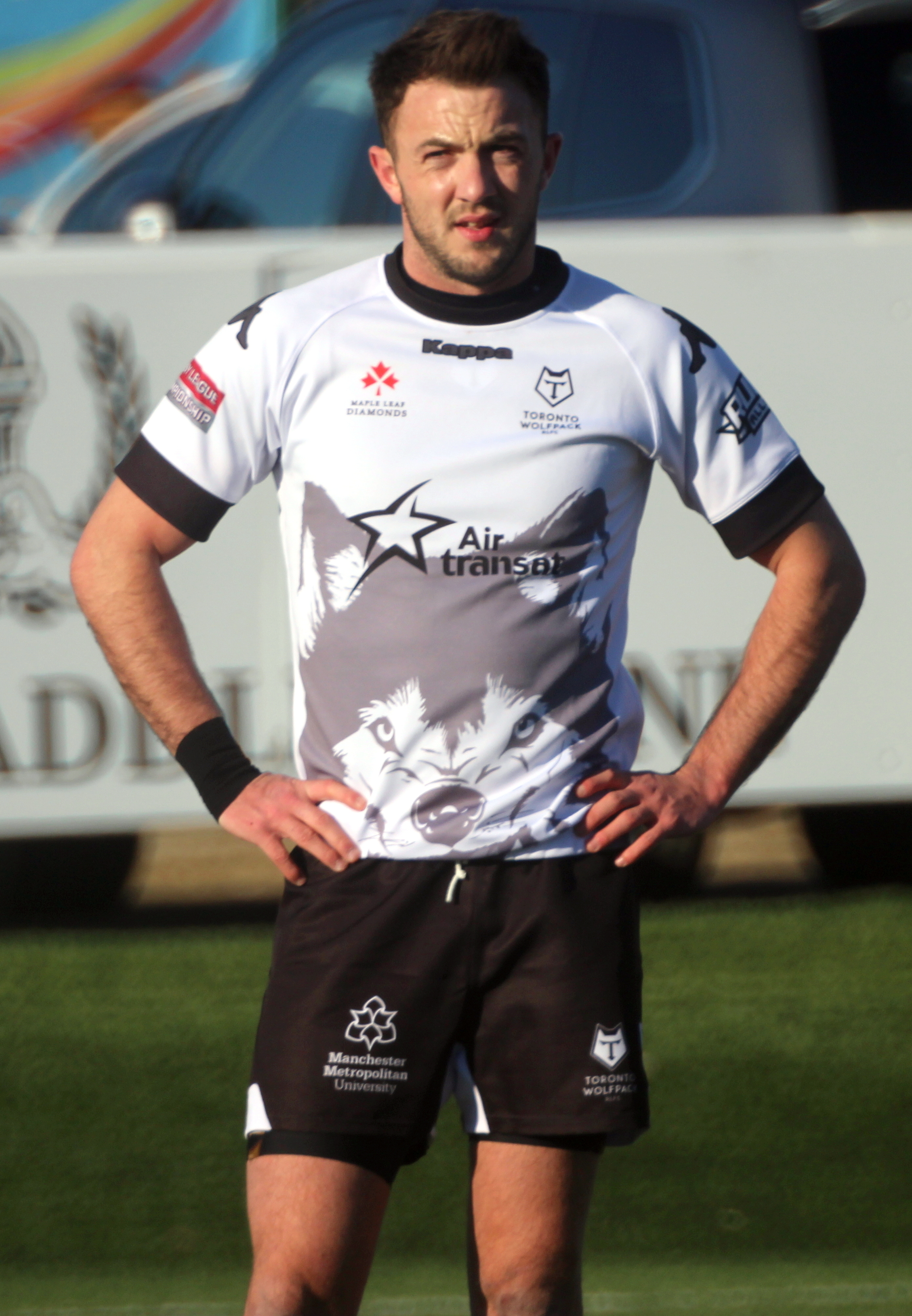

Personal information
- Full name: Ryan Brierley
- Born: 12 March 1992 (age 33) Preston, Lancashire, England
- Height: 5 ft 11.5 in (181.6 cm)
- Weight: 12 st 12 lb (82 kg)

Playing information
- Position: Fullback, Scrum-half, Stand-off
Club
Years	Team	Pld	T	G	FG	P
2012–16	Leigh Centurions	125	133	38	4	588
2016–17	Huddersfield Giants	25	15	2	0	64
2017–19	Toronto Wolfpack	40	26	83	2	272
2019(loan)	→ Leigh Centurions	13	11	21	1	87
2020	Hull Kingston Rovers	10	3	8	0	28
2021	Leigh Centurions	18	10	29	0	98
2022–25	Salford Red Devils	88	34	16	1	169
2025	Oldham	5	2	0	0	8
	Total	324	234	197	8	1314
Representative
Years	Team	Pld	T	G	FG	P
2016–2022	Scotland	9	3	18	0	48
- Source: As of 16 October 2025

Ryan Brierley (born 12 March 1992) is a former Scotland international rugby league footballer who last played as a goal-kicking fullback, scrum-half or stand-off for Oldham in the RFL Championship. He is the currently the Chief executive officer of Salford Red Devils.

He previously played for the Leigh Centurions over two separate spells in the Championship and in the Super League. Brierley has also played for Salford Red Devils, Huddersfield Giants and Hull KR in the top flight and Toronto Wolfpack and Oldham in the lower tiers, and spent time on loan from Toronto at Leigh in the second tier.

== Background ==
Brierley was born in Preston, Lancashire, England. After moving to Bolton as a two-year old, Brierley played junior rugby with local club Westhoughton Lions.

== Club career ==
=== Early career ===
Brierley joined Castleford Tigers academy in 2009, and appeared in a first team friendly for Castleford early in 2012, scoring a try against York City Knights.

=== Leigh Centurions ===
After failing to get an opportunity in the first team with Castleford, Brierley joined Leigh Centurions. Brierley's first appearance for the club came on Saturday 7 January 2012 when he scored two tries in a friendly victory away to Super League neighbours Salford.

He became a prolific try-scorer at the club, finishing as the club's top try-scorer for four consecutive seasons between 2012 and 2015. He moved into the club's top 5 all-time leading try-scorers with 133 in 125 appearances following a two-try display against Bradford Bulls on 28 February 2016, which was his last match for the club.

=== Huddersfield ===
After triggering a clause in his contract, Brierley left Leigh and joined Super League club Huddersfield Giants on a four-and-a-half-year contract in March 2016.

=== Toronto Wolfpack ===
Brierley signed with the Toronto Wolfpack for an undisclosed transfer fee in April 2017.

=== Hull Kingston Rovers ===
Brierley signed with Hull Kingston Rovers in December 2019. Rovers finished bottom of the table, avoiding relegation following former club Toronto's exit from the competition.

=== Leigh Centurions (rejoined) ===
After just one season with Hull KR, Brierley returned to Leigh for the 2021 season.

In July, Brierley was ruled out indefinitely with an eye injury, but returned before the end of the season to score a hat-trick against Wakefield Trinity, Leigh's second victory of the season.

=== Salford Red Devils ===
On 20 September 2021, Brierley signed for Salford in the Super League, the club he supported as a child. Brierley played 26 games for Salford in the 2022 Super League season including the clubs semi-final loss against St Helens. In the 2023 Super League season, Brierley played 26 games for Salford as the club finished 7th on the table. Brierley played 23 games for Salford in the 2024 Super League season including the clubs elimination play-off loss against Leigh.

On 7 August 2025 it was reported that he had left Salford.

=== Oldham RLFC ===
On 7 August 2025, Brierley signed a contract to join RFL Championship side Oldham.

== International career ==
Though born in England, Brierley's family is from Kilwinning in North Ayrshire, and thus he qualifies to play for Scotland at international level. He made his Scotland début in the 2016 Four Nations, scoring a try in a defeat by Australia.

== Honours ==
- Championship: 2014, 2015
- League 1: 2017
