= Sam Hopkins (rugby league) =

Wales international Rugby League player

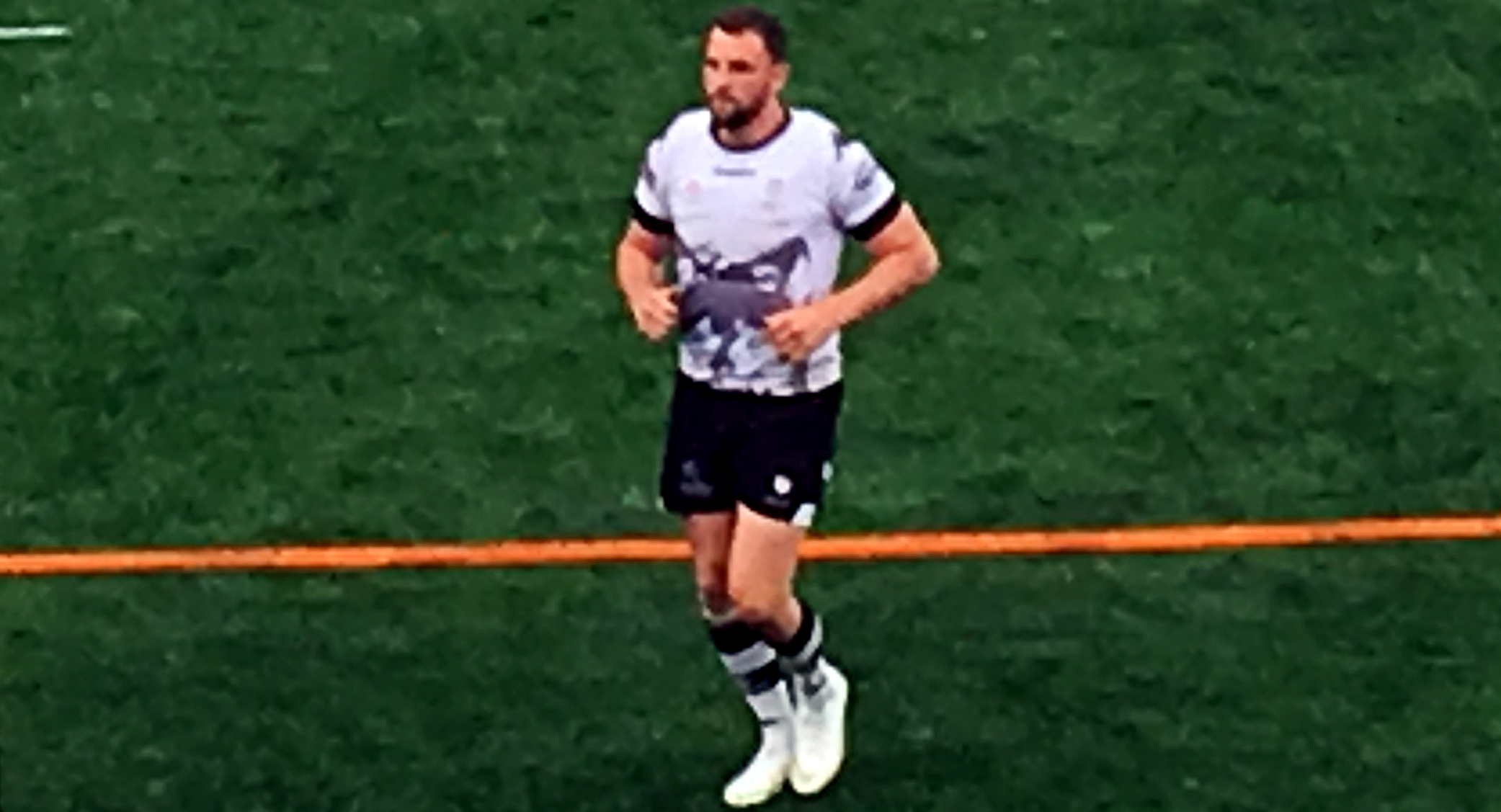

Personal information
- Born: 17 February 1990 (age 35); England.
- Height: 6 ft 2 in (1.88 m)
- Weight: 17 st 5 lb (110 kg)

Playing information
- Position: Prop, Loose forward
Club
Years	Team	Pld	T	G	FG	P
2011–13	Leigh Centurions	64	26	0	0	104
2014	Wigan Warriors	0	0	0	0	0
2014(DR)	→ Workington Town	1	1	0	0	4
2014(loan)	→ Leigh Centurions	20	5	0	0	20
2015–17	Leigh Centurions	76	24	0	0	96
2018–19	Toronto Wolfpack	19	2	0	0	8
2019–20	Workington Town	23	4	0	0	16
2020–	Rochdale Hornets	0	0	0	0	0
	Total	203	62	0	0	248
Representative
Years	Team	Pld	T	G	FG	P
2017–	Wales	2	0	0	0	0
- Source: As of 21 Jun 2022

Sam Hopkins (born 17 February 1990) is a Wales international rugby league footballer who plays as a prop for Rochdale Hornets in Betfred League 1.

== Career ==
=== Leigh Centurions ===
Hopkins made his senior début for the Leigh Centurions on 6 March 2011 in a Challenge Cup match against amateur side the Hull Dockers. His league début came later that month on 27 March 2011 in a match against the Widnes Vikings.

=== Wigan Warriors ===
In 2014, Hopkins transferred to local rivals, the Wigan Warriors, but failed to make an appearance for the Super League club. He did however play a single game on dual-registration for Workington Town. He re-joined the Leigh Centurions on loan for most of the 2014 season.

=== Leigh Centurions (rejoined) ===
In 2015, Hopkins made his return to Leigh Centurions permanent.

In 2017 he made his Super League début for the Leigh Centurions and appeared in the 2017 Rugby League World Cup for Wales.

=== Toronto Wolfpack ===
In December 2017, Hopkins joined Toronto Wolfpack on a one-year deal.

=== Workington Town ===
In January 2019 he joined former super league side Workington Town. His new home ground is Derwent Park. He will play in league 1

=== Rochdale Hornets ===
On 23 January 2020 it was announced that Hopkins had signed for Rochdale Hornets
