= Adam Higson =

English professional rugby league footballer

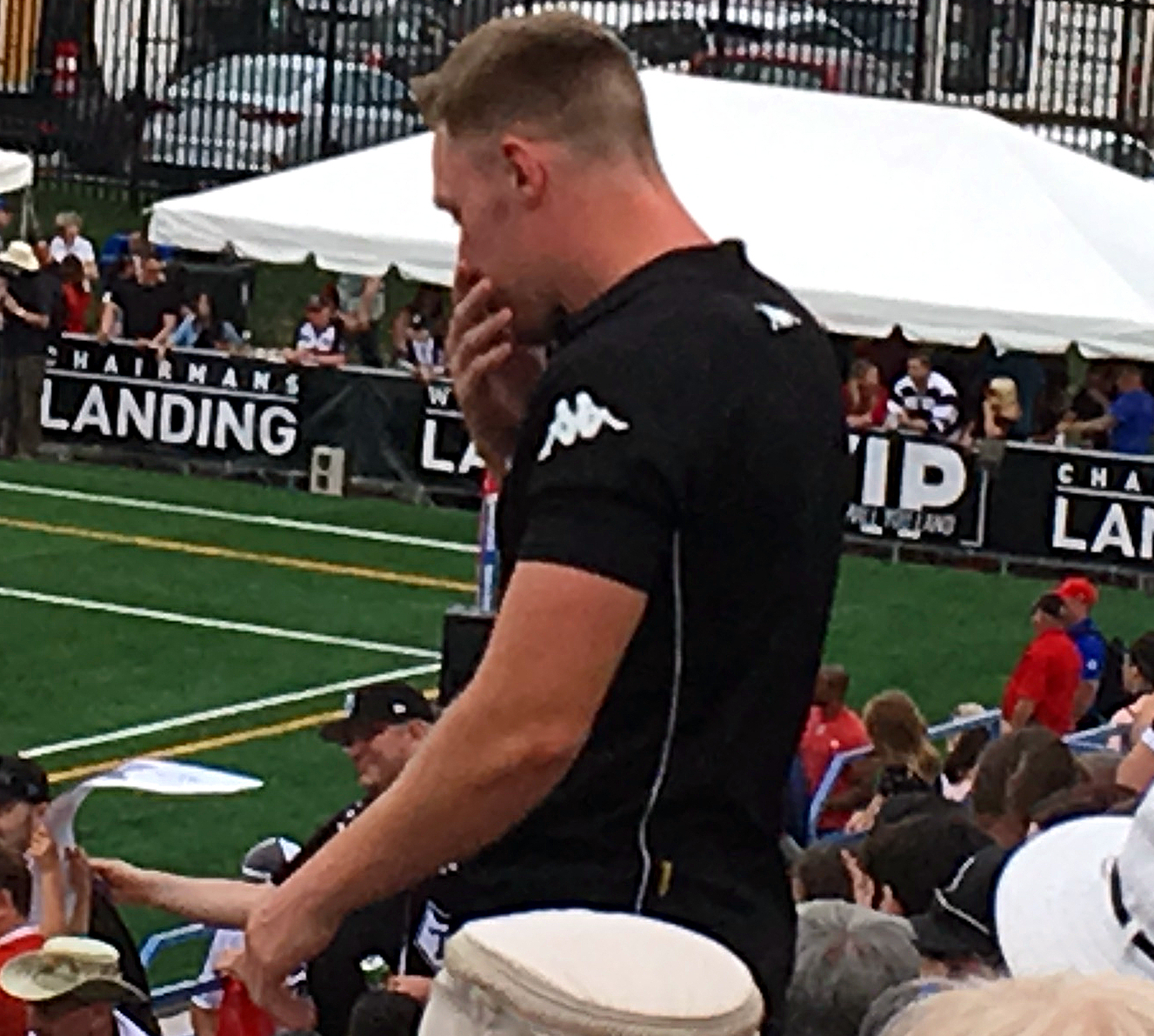

Personal information
- Born: 19 May 1987 (age 39) Leigh, Greater Manchester, England
- Height: 6 ft 4 in (1.92 m)
- Weight: 15 st 6 lb (98 kg)

Playing information
- Position: Wing
Club
Years	Team	Pld	T	G	FG	P
2009–17	Leigh Centurions	155	65	0	0	260
2012(loan)	→ Swinton Lions	15	10	0	0	40
2018–19	Toronto Wolfpack	18	12	0	0	48
2019–20	Leigh Centurions	10	10	0	0	40
	Total	198	97	0	0	388
- Source: As of 25 February 2021

Adam Higson (born 19 May 1987) is an English professional rugby league footballer who last played as a winger for the Leigh Centurions in the Championship.

He has previously played for Leigh Centurions in the Championship and the Super League, and on loan from the Leigh Centurions at the Swinton Lions in the second tier. Higson has also played for the Toronto Wolfpack in the Championship.

== Background ==
Higson was born in Leigh, Greater Manchester, England.

== Career ==
Higson made his senior début for the Leigh Centurions on 15 February 2009 in a Northern Rail Cup match against the London Skolars. His league début came a month later on 15 March in a Championship match against the Sheffield Eagles.

In 2012, Higson spent a season on loan at the Swinton Lions.

In December 2017 Higson signed a one-year deal with the Toronto Wolfpack.
