= Scott Hale =

English rugby league footballer

Personal information
- Born: 14 December 1991 (age 33) Haydock, near St. Helens, England

Playing information
- Height: 6 ft 2 in (1.88 m)
- Weight: 15 st 2 lb (96 kg)
- Position: Second-row, Centre
Club
Years	Team	Pld	T	G	FG	P
2011–12	St. Helens	4	1	0	0	4
2012(loan)	→ Swinton Lions	5	1	0	0	4
2013–17	Dewsbury Rams	112	27	0	0	108
	Total	121	29	0	0	116

Scott Hale (born 14 December 1991) is an English former professional rugby league footballer who played in the 2010s for St. Helens, and the Dewsbury Rams. He played most regularly as a second-row, but could also play at centre.

== Career ==
Hale started his career at St. Helens, signing for the club from Haydock Warriors, after attending and playing for Haydock Sports College in secondary school rugby. He moved to Dewsbury in 2013. In May 2017, after making over 100 appearances for the Dewsbury club, he announced his retirement due to a recurring shoulder injury.
