= Warren Thompson (rugby league) =

English rugby league footballer

Personal information
- Full name: Warren Thompson
- Born: 24 February 1990 (age 35); St Helens, Merseyside, England
- Height: 6 ft 4 in (193 cm)
- Weight: 16 st 2 lb (103 kg)

Playing information
- Position: Second-row, Prop
Club
Years	Team	Pld	T	G	FG	P
2011–11	St. Helens	1	0	0	0	0
2013–16	Rochdale Hornets	22	3	0	0	12
2017–21	North Wales Crusaders	33	4	0	0	16
	Total	56	7	0	0	28
- Source: As of 30 April 2011

Warren Thompson (born October 24, 1990) is an English professional rugby league footballer who plays as a prop or second row forward for the North Wales Crusaders in League 1. He was previously with St Helens and Rochdale Hornets.

He signed for the club from Thatto Heath Crusaders.
