= Nathan Ashe =

NZ rugby league footballer

Personal information
- Full name: Nathan Ashe
- Born: 5 October 1991 (age 33); Auckland, New Zealand
- Height: 1.81 m (5 ft 11 in)
- Weight: 79 kg (12 st 6 lb)

Playing information
- Position: Fullback, Stand-off
Club
Years	Team	Pld	T	G	FG	P
2011–13	St. Helens	12	1	0	0	4
2013(loan)	→ Rochdale Hornets	2	0	0	0	0
2019–25	Hibiscus Coast	15	8			32
	Total	29	9	0	0	36
- Source: As of 28 May 2025

Nathan Ashe (born 5 October 1991) is a professional rugby league footballer. Born in New Zealand he moved to England at the age of 17, he played his first professional season with St. Helens in the engage Super League after excelling at academy level. He plays chiefly as a fullback, but is equally at home at stand-off, and also as a hooker in recent times. Playing with flare and excitement, he earned much respect from his peers.

In 2014 he played for London Acton side Wests Warriors in the London third-tier Entry League.

In the late 2010s he began playing for the Hibiscus Coast Raiders in the Auckland Rugby League competition. He scored a try in their 24–18 loss to Richmond on 22 April 2023 and has continued to play for them through into the 2025 season.
