= Nick Rawsthorne =

English professional rugby league footballer

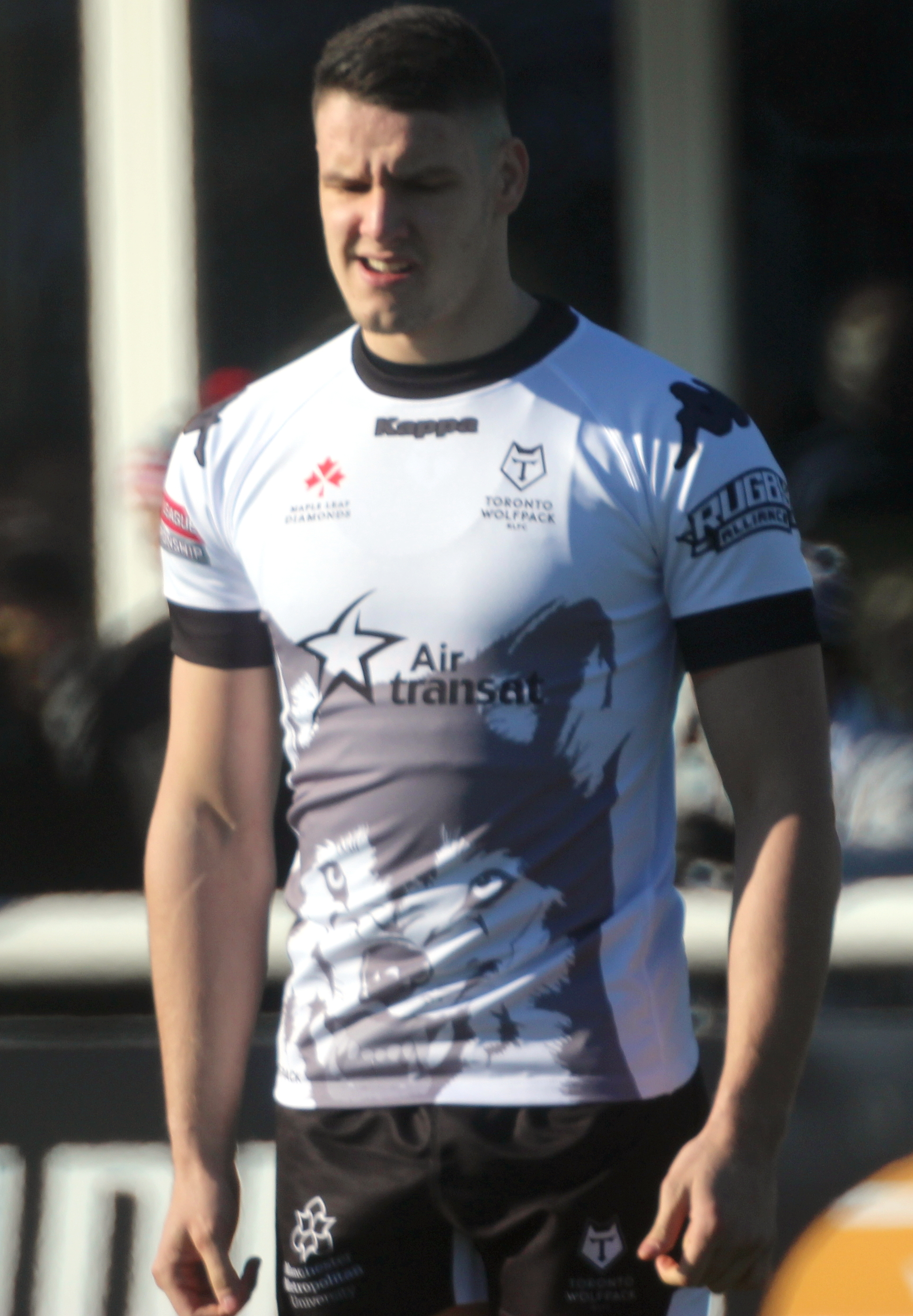

Personal information
- Full name: Nicholas Rawsthorne
- Born: 30 September 1995 (age 30) Halifax, West Yorkshire, England
- Height: 6 ft 1 in (1.85 m)
- Weight: 15 st 2 lb (96 kg)

Playing information
- Position: Centre, Wing
Club
Years	Team	Pld	T	G	FG	P
2016	Halifax	7	4	8	0	32
2016(loan)	→ S. Wales Scorpions	3	1	0	0	4
2017–18	Hull F.C.	3	2	2	0	8
2017(loan)	→ York City Knights	5	8	10	0	48
2017(loan)	→ Doncaster	8	2	1	0	10
2017(loan)	→ Leigh Centurions	1	1	0	0	4
2018–19	Toronto Wolfpack	34	27	0	0	108
2019(loan)	→ York City Knights	3	1	1	0	6
2020	Hull Kingston Rovers	6	1	0	0	4
2021–23	Halifax Panthers	11	5	0	0	20
2023(loan)	→ Rochdale Hornets	1	0	0	0	0
2023–24	Oldham RLFC	10	10	0	0	28
	Total	92	62	22	0	272
- Source: As of 21 Aug 2023

Nick Rawsthorne (born 30 September 1995) is an English professional rugby league footballer who most recently played as a centre or winger for Oldham RLFC in RFL League 1.

He has played for Halifax in the Championship, and on loan from 'Fax at the South Wales Scorpions in League 1. Rawsthorne has also played for Hull F.C. in the Super League, and on loan from Hull at the York City Knights and Doncaster in League 1 and the Leigh Centurions in the Super League. He has also played for the Toronto Wolfpack in the Championship, and on loan from Toronto at York in League 1.

== Background ==
Rawsthorne was born in Halifax, West Yorkshire, England.

== Playing career ==
Rawsthorne grew up playing rugby union for Leeds Carnegie academy and represented England Academies from Under-16 to Under-18s.

=== Halifax RLFC ===
In 2016 he made his professional début for Halifax against the Bradford Bulls.

=== Hull FC ===
He joined Hull F.C. in 2017 and made three appearances in the Super League for them.

=== Toronto Wolfpack ===
He joined Toronto Wolfpack for the start of the 2018 season on a two-year contract.

=== Hull KR ===
On 13 October 2019, it was announced by Hull Kingston Rovers that he had signed a two-year contract with the club.

=== Halifax Panthers ===
On 24 February 2021, it was reported that he had signed for Halifax in the RFL Championship.

=== Rochdale Hornets (loan) ===
On 26 April 2023, it was reported that he had signed for Rochdale Hornets in the RFL League 1 on a one-month loan.

=== Oldham RLFC ===
On 16 Jun 2023, it was reported that he had signed for Oldham RLFC in the RFL League 1. On 20 February 2024, Oldham RLFC confirmed that Rawsthorne had left the club due to a change in work and family circumstances.
