= Playing for Success =

Education scheme in England

Playing for Success was an initiative in England funded by the Department for Children, Schools and Families, which aimed to raise literacy, numeracy and ICT standards amongst demotivated KS2 and KS3 pupils by holding out-of-school-hours study support centres at football clubs and other sports grounds. The scheme began in 1997; government funding was withdrawn in 2011.

The scheme funded Study Support Centres which used the environment and medium of football, rugby union and other sports to help motivate pupils identified by their schools as being in need of a boost to help them get back up to speed in literacy, numeracy and information and communication technology. The centres were staffed by centre managers, who were qualified and experienced teachers, supported by higher education and further education students working as mentors.

The scheme started in 1997, when the Department for Education and Skills supported a small pilot which was held in FA Premier League clubs; it was extended to Division One clubs a couple of years later. This scheme was extended twice from 2004, through a partnership between the Football Foundation and the Department for Education and Skills. The extension saw new centres open around the country, mainly by involving other sports such as rugby union, rugby league, cricket, hockey, tennis, gymnastics, basketball, ice hockey, and horseracing. By January 2008, 162 clubs were involved with 159 centres, benefiting 210,00 pupils to date.

Funding was withdrawn in 2011 as part of the austerity measures implemented by the 2010 coalition government, in order to save £13.7m per year.

== Study Support Centres ==
In 2010, there were centres in all regions of England.

Region	Study Support Centres
South West	Exeter City FC, Bath Rugby, Bristol City FC, Cheltenham Racecourse, Cornish Pirates, Delaware Adventure Zone for Learning, Gloucester Rugby FC, Oxford United FC, Portsmouth FC, Somerset County Cricket Club, Southampton FC, Yeovil Town FC, AFC Bournemouth Bristol Rovers FC, Forest Green Rovers FC and Plymouth Argyle FC
London & South East	Arsenal FC, Brighton and Hove Albion FC, Charlton Athletic FC, Chelsea FC, Colchester United FC, Crystal Palace FC, East London Gymnastics Club, Eton Manor RUFC, Fulham FC. Gillingham FC, Hitchin Town FC, John Nike Leisuresport Complex, Kent CCC, King's Lynn Stars Speedway Club, Lea Valley Athletics Club, Leyton Orient FC, London Aquatics Centre, Millwall FC, Norwich City FC, North Walsham Rugby Football Club, Queens Park Rangers FC, Reading FC, Surrey County Cricket Club, Sussex County Cricket Club, Swindon Town FC, The All England Lawn Tennis Club, Tottenham Hotspur FC, Watford FC, Wembley Stadium, West Ham United FC, Woking FC, Brentford FC, Cambridge United FC, Southend United FC and Tooting and Mitcham FC
Midlands & East	Aston Villa FC, Bedford Sports and Hockey Centre/Bedford Rugby Club, Birmingham City FC, Boston United FC, Coventry City FC, Coventry RUFC, Derby County FC, Derbyshire CCC, Dunstall Racecourse, Ipswich Town FC, King's Lynn Stars, Leicester City FC, Leicester Tigers Rugby Union FC, Leicestershire County Cricket Club, Milton Keynes Dons (MK Dons), Moseley Rugby Club, National Stud, Northampton County Cricket Club, Northampton Saints Rugby Football Club, Nottingham Forest FC, Oulton Broad Water Sports Centre, Port Vale FC, Silverstone Motor Racing Circuit / Rockingham Speedway, Stoke City FC, Telford Tigers Ice Hockey Club, The City of Nottingham Tennis Centre, The National Ice Centre, Walsall FC, West Bromwich Albion FC, Wolverhampton Wanderers FC, Worcester Rugby Club, AFC Telford, Burton Albion FC, Lincoln City FC, Mansfield Town FC, Northampton Town FC and Rushden and Diamonds FC
North West	Blackburn Rovers Football & Athletic plc, Blackpool FC, Bolton Wanderers FC, Burnley FC, Crewe Alexandra FC, Everton FC, Lancashire County Crown Green Bowling Association, Leigh Centurions RLFC, Liverpool FC, Manchester City FC, Manchester United FC, Preston North End FC, Sale Harriers Athletics Club, Stockport County FC/Sale Sharks RFU, Thongsbridge Tennis Club, Tranmere Rovers FC, Warrington Wolves Rugby League, Werneth Cricket Club, Wigan Warriors Rugby League Club, Barrow AFC, Carlisle United FC, Oldham Athletic FC and Rochdale FC/Rochdale Hornets RLFC
North	Barnsley FC, Batley Bulldogs RLFC, Bradford Bulls Rugby League Club, Dewsbury Rams RLFC, Earth Titans (Rotherham Titans RUFC), English Institute of Sport, Featherstone Rovers RLFC, Halifax RLFC, Huddersfield Town AFC, Keighley Cougars RLFC, Leeds Rhinos RLFC/Leeds, Tykes RUFC, Leeds United FC, Rotherham United FC, ShawLane Community Sports Centre, Sheffield Sharks Basketball, Sheffield United FC, Sheffield Wednesday FC, St Helens RLFC, Wakefield Trinity Wildcats RLFC, Yorkshire County Cricket Club, Doncaster Rovers FC / Doncaster Lakers RLC / Doncaster Belles Ladies FC
North East	Blyth Spartans FC, Durham Amateur Rowing Club, Durham County Cricket Club, Grimsby Town FC, Heslam Park Rugby and Cricket Club (Study Parks), Hull AFC/Hull City FC, Hull Kingston Rovers RLFC, Middlesbrough FC, Newcastle Falcons, Newcastle United FC, Sunderland AFC, Darlington FC, Hartlepool United FC and Scunthorpe United FC (Study Parks)
