= Tom Armstrong (rugby league) =

English rugby league footballer

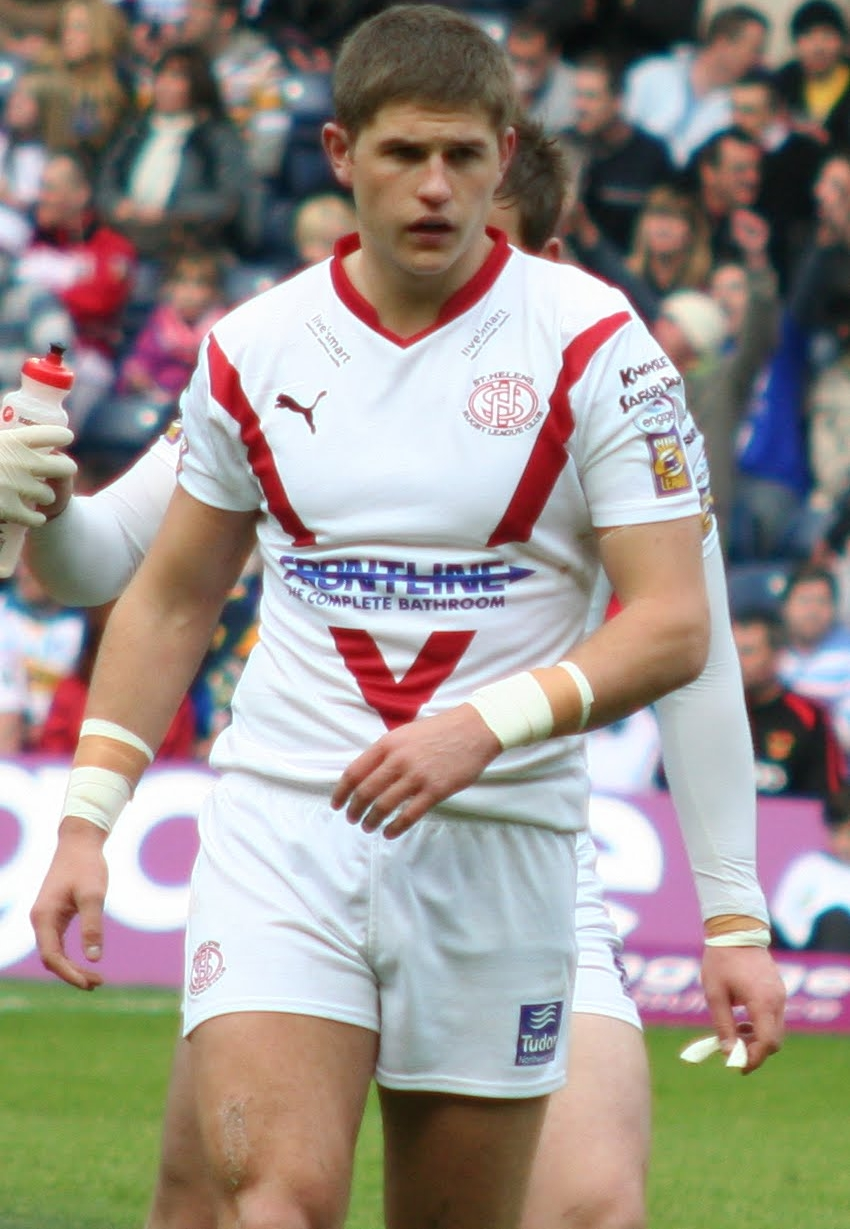

Personal information
- Full name: Thomas Armstrong
- Born: 12 September 1989 (age 35); St. Helens, England

Playing information
- Height: 6 ft 3 in (1.91 m)
- Weight: 15 st 2 lb (96 kg)
- Position: Centre, Wing, Second-row
Club
Years	Team	Pld	T	G	FG	P
2009–12	St Helens	17	10	0	0	40
2011	→Leigh Centurions(DR)	23	10	0	0	40
2012	Swinton Lions	25	13	0	0	52
2013	Sheffield Eagles	35	19	0	0	76
2014–16	Leigh Centurions	71	45	0	0	180
2017	Widnes Vikings	11	1	0	0	4
2018	Toronto Wolfpack	0	0	0	0	0
	Total	182	98	0	0	392

Tom Armstrong is an English former professional rugby league footballer who played primarily at centre, but also deputised on the wing and the back row.

He played for amateur side Pilkington Recs before joining St Helens. Armstrong also played for Leigh, Swinton, Widnes Vikings and the Toronto Wolfpack in the Championship.

== Career ==
Armstrong's début game for Saints came against Warrington in the first round of Super League XIV. Standing in for New Zealand international Francis Meli, he scored a try in a 26-14 win. He went on from this to play against Huddersfield in the next round, Hull Kingston Rovers and a try scoring performance in a 4-0 win over Crusaders (he was the only player to score in this game) After a period in the reserves, he came back to play in the win over Harlequins RL where he scored a try in a 44-24 victory.

It took Armstrong 13 rounds to break back into the first-team. At the Magic Weekend, held at Murrayfield, he scored a try from left centre in a 54-0 win over Hull Kingston Rovers, in his first game of the season.

Armstrong was dual registered with Leigh for 2011's Super League XVI. Armstrong scored the winning try in Leigh's 20-16 win over Halifax in the 2011 Northern Rail Cup Final.

Armstrong was released from his contract with St. Helens and has decided to join Swinton ahead of the 2012 season.

Armstrong was forced to retire from the professional game in 2018 due to osteoarthritis. In 2024, he joined Fylde RFC as a player-coach.
