= 2012 Leeds Rhinos season =

English rugby league club season

Leeds Rhinos
Club information
- Full name: Leeds Rhinos; Rugby League Football Club

Current details
- Ground: Headingley Carnegie Stadium (20,500)
- CEO: (England) Gary Hetherington
- Coach: (England) Brian McDermott
- Competition: Super League

Uniforms
Home colours	Away colours

Leeds Rhinos played in the 2012 Super League season, alongside Bradford Bulls, Castleford Tigers, Catalans Dragons, Huddersfield Giants, Hull FC, Hull K.R, London Broncos, Salford City Reds, St. Helens, Wakefield Trinity Wildcats, Warrington Wolves. Widnes Vikings, Wigan Warriors

== Transfers ==
=== Ins ===
- Richard Moore (Crusaders RL)
- Luke Briscoe (Hull)
- Darrell Griffin (Huddersfield Giants)
- Shaun Lunt (Huddersfield Giants) (loan, signed mid season)

=== Outs ===
- Ali Lauitiiti (Wakefield Trinity Wildcats)
- Keith Senior (released)
- Luke Burgess (South Sydney Rabbitohs)
- Danny Buderus (Newcastle Knights)
- Ben Cross (Wigan Warriors, 2011), (Widnes Vikings, 2012)
- Kyle Amor (Wakefield Trinity Wildcats) (loan)
- George Elliott (York City Knights)
- Callum Casey, Michael Coady and Rory Kettlewell (all released)

== Squad ==
- Confirmed squad

2012 Leeds Rhinos season
First team squad			Coaching staff
1 Brent Webb – FB; 2 Ben Jones Bishop – WG; 3 Kallum Watkins – CE; 4 Zak Hardaker – CE; 5 Ryan Hall – WG; 6 Danny McGuire – SO; 7 Rob Burrow – SH; 8 Kylie Leuluai – PR; 9 Paul McShane – HK; 10 Jamie Peacock (vc) – PR; 11 Jamie Jones-Buchanan – SR; 12 Carl Ablett – SR; 13 Kevin Sinfield (c) – LF	14 Lee Smith – WG; 15 Brett Delaney – SR; 16 Ryan Bailey – PR; 17 Ian Kirke – SR; 18 Chris Clarkson – SR; 19 Weller Hauraki – SR; 20 Darrell Griffin – PR; 21 Richard Moore – PR; 22; 23 Brad Singleton – PR; 24 Liam Hood – HK; 25 Stevie Ward – LF; 26 Luke Ambler – PR	27 Luke Briscoe – SO; 28 Jamal Chisholm – SR; 29 Jared Stewart – SR; 30 Daniel Smith – SR; 31 Shaun Lunt – HK	Head coach: Brian McDermott; Assistant coach: James Lowes; Legend: (c) Captain(s); (vc) Vice-captain(s); Updated: 10 November 2011; Source(s): Player profiles

== Season review ==
=== Previous season ===
News related to this season

- 16 June 2011 – Leeds Rhinos announce that props Luke Burgess (signed for South Sydney Rabbitohs) and Ben Cross (signed for Wigan Warriors 2011 and Widnes Vikings 2012) will leave the club.
- 7 July 2011 – After 13 years at the club, Keith Senior announced that he would be joining Crusaders.
- 27 July 2011 – Following the Super League licensing announcement, which saw Crusaders withdraw their licence, so Keith Senior was left without a club.
- 10 August 2011 – Wakefield Trinity Wildcats announce the signing of Ali Lauitiiti ending an 8-year stay at the club.
- 12 August 2011 Leeds Rhinos announce the signing of prop Richard Moore from Crusaders on a 3-year contract.
- 22 September 2011 Leeds announce the signing of Hull F.C. youngster Luke Briscoe.
- 28 September 2011 Leeds announce that hookers Paul McShane and Liam Hood signed 4-year contracts in anticipation of Danny Buderus leaving.
- 30 September 2011 Leeds Rhinos reach the Super League Grand Final for the 4th time in 5 years, they take on St. Helens.
- 30 September 2011 – Danny Buderus reveals that the Grand Final will be his farewell from the club, announcing that he will be joining Newcastle Knights for a second stint, to end his career. Buderus made 220 appearances for the Knights before joining Leeds in 2009, he was man of the match in the game that got Leeds to the final vs Warrington Wolves

=== October ===
- 3 October 2011 – Leeds announce that Kyle Amor will join Wakefield Trinity Wildcats on a 3-year contract. However the Rhinos have the option of getting him back after a year.
- 8 October 2011 – Rhinos youngster George Elliott will join York City Knights in 2012, he made one first team appearance this season.
- 8 October 2011 – Leeds Rhinos are crowned Super League Champions beating St. Helens 32–16 in front of 69,107 people, Leeds scrum half Rob Burrow won the Harry Sunderland Trophy. Leeds are the first team to win from 5th place in the Super League history. Leeds will now face Manly Sea Eagles in the World Club Challenge.
- 10 October 2011 – 9 Rhinos were called up for England duty. Kevin Sinfield, Ryan Hall, Ben Jones Bishop, Ryan Bailey, Jamie Jones Buchanan, Carl Ablett and captaining England is prop Jamie Peacock. Zak Hardaker and Chris Clarkson have been called up for England Knights duty.
- 11 October 2011 – Danny McGuire was added to the England squad after St. Helens Jonny Lomax pulled out through injury.
- 13 October 2011 – Leeds Rhinos announce the signing of Huddersfield Giants prop Darrell Griffin on a 3-year contract.
- 17 October 2011 – Leeds Rhinos youngsters James Duckworth and new signing Luke Briscoe added to the England Academy squad alongside Stevie Ward and Jordan Baldwinson in the squad to face the Australian Institute of Sport (AIS) at Leigh Sports Village, Leigh on Sunday 4 December 2011.
- 18 October 2011 – Leeds Rhinos academy products Liam Hood, Stevie Ward and Brad Singleton have been called up to the Rhinos 25-man squad for 2012.
- 19 October 2011 – Leeds Rhinos players Ryan Hall, Kevin Sinfield, Jamie Peacock and player of the season Jamie Jones Buchanan are selected in the 17 to take on France in an international friendly, Peacock will captain the side.
- 21 October 2011 – England defeat France 32–18 with Ryan Hall scoring inside the first minute, and Kevin Sinfield contributing with the conversions.
- 24 October 2011 – It is announced that the World Club Challenge clash vs Manly Sea Eagles will be played at either Headingley Stadium or Elland Road despite suggestions that it may be played in Australia or Dubai
- 25 October 2011 – Leeds announce that youngsters Paul McShane, Zak Hardaker, Kallum Watkins, Ben Jones Bishop and Chris Clarkson will be in the 25-man squad and will be at the heart of the club for the 2012 season.
- 26 October 2011 – Ryan Hall, Kevin Sinfield, Jamie Peacock and Jamie Jones Buchanan are called up for England duty again in the first Four Nations game against Wales on Saturday 29 October.
- 29 October 2011 – England defeated Wales 42–4. Wigan Warriors full back Sam Tomkins scored 4 tries, and Leeds captain Kevin Sinfield kicked 5 out of 8 goals (10 points).

=== November 2011 ===
- 3 November 2011 – Rhinos quartet Kevin Sinfield, Jamie Peacock (c), Ryan Hall and Jamie Jones Buchanan are included in the England team to take on Australia at Wembley on Saturday 5 November.
- 5 November 2011 – Ryan Hall scored two tries for England vs Australia despite losing 36–20.
- 10 November 2011 – Rhinos announced their 30-man squad for the 2012 season which involved no less than 13 changes to the squad numbers which are shown in the team section above, the likes of Zak Hardaker, Ben Jones Bishop, Kallum Watkins and Paul McShane were moved up into the first 13-man squad.
- 12 November 2011 – England defeat New Zealand 28-6 to reach the Four Nations Final, thanks to a try from Ryan Hall and Kevin Sinfield kicking 6 out of 6 goals, he also received the Man of the Match award. Jamie Peacock captained the side and Jamie Jones Buchanan was also part of the 17-man squad.
- 14 November 2011 – The Rhinos announced their new home shirt for the 2012 season, the kit is the traditional blue and amber, dark blue base with a yellow band across the middle.
- 19 November 2011 – Rhinos stars Ryan Hall, Kevin Sinfield, Jamie Peacock (c) and Jamie Jones Buchanan featured for England against Australia in the Four Nations Final at Elland Road. Ryan Hall scored England's only try with Kevin Sinfield kicking the conversion and a penalty, however England lost 30–8.
- 22 November 2011 – The Heinz Big Soup World Club Challenge will take place at Headingley Stadium between the Rhinos and Manly Sea Eagles on Friday 17 February 2012.
- 25 November 2011 The Super League fixtures were announced, and the Rhinos will take on Hull K.R at Headingley Stadium. It was also announced that Leeds Rhinos will take on Bradford Bulls over the Manchester Magic weekend at Etihad Stadium on the weekend of 26/27 May. Leeds will finish the season against Huddersfield Giants at Galpharm Stadium.
- 28 November 2011 The 2013 Rugby League World Cup venues were revealed, it was announced that Headingley Stadium would be hosting a quarter-final and a group match, and Leeds as a city would be hosting two teams, providing facilities for both.
- 30 November 2011 – Leeds Rhinos announced a development in their partnership with Whitehaven, part of the latest agreement see the Rhinos take on Whitehaven in a friendly on 29 January 2012.

=== December 2011 ===
- 7 December 2011 – Rhinos head coach Brian McDermott was announced to be one of the top 5 personalities of the year in the Gillette Rugby League Yearbook 2011/2012 alongside Wigan Warriors Sam Tomkins, Man of Steel and Castleford Tigers Rangi Chase, Featherstone Rovers Head Coach Daryl Powell and recently retired Australia legend Darren Lockyer.
- 9 December 2011 – Leeds Rhinos player of the season Jamie Jones Buchanan confirmed that he would be a Rhinos for life by signing a new 3-year contract with the club.
- 19 December 2011 Rhinos announce their team for the game vs Wakefield Trinity on Boxing Day, the squad is as follows:

1. Lee Smith 2. Jimmy Watson 3. Kallum Watkins 4. Zak Hardaker 5. Jamel Chisholm 6. Stevie Ward 7. Rob Burrow 8. Darrell Griffin 9. Paul McShane 10. Ian Kirke 11. Jay Pitts 12. Weller Hauraki 13. Chris Clarkson 14. Liam Hood 15. Richard Moore 16. Brad Singleton 17. Luke Briscoe

- 23 December 2011 – Chris Clarkson signs a new five-year contract with the club.
- 26 December – Leeds Rhinos beat Wakefield Trinity Wildcats in the traditional Boxing Day clash at Headingley Stadium. The final score was 26-10 thanks to tries for Chris Clarkson, Liam Hood, Kallum Watkins, Rob Burrow and Zak Hardaker, the Rhinos man of the match was announced as Weller Hauraki, new signings Darrell Griffin and Richard Moore made their debuts for the club.

=== January ===
- 5 January – The Rhinos flew out to Cyprus for a pre season warm weather training camp.
- 13 January 2012 – It was announced that the South Stand would be closed for the upcoming Rob Burrow testimonial match vs Featherstone Rovers on Friday 20 January due to planned maintenance work.
- 15 January 2012 – A Leeds Rhinos U20's side lost to York City Knights 26–18 at the Huntington Stadium.
- 17 January 2012 – Leeds Rhinos star winger Ryan Hall signed a new 5-year contract with the club to keep him at the club until the end of the 2016 season.
- 19 January 2012 – The Rhinos announced a strong lineup for Rob Burrow's testimonial match vs Featherstone Rovers. The squad is a follows: 1 Brent Webb, 14 Lee Smith, 3 Kallum Watkins, 4 Zak Hardaker, 5 Ryan Hall, 6 Danny McGuire, 7 Rob Burrow, 8 Kylie Leuluai, 9 Paul McShane, 16 Ryan Bailey, 11 Jamie Jones Buchanan, 14 Brett Delaney, 12 Carl Ablett Subs: 19 Weller Hauraki, 24 Liam Hood, 20 Darrell Griffin, 21 Richard Moore, 18 Chris Clarkson
- 20 January 2012 – The Rhinos beat Featherstone Rovers 66–0 in Rob Burrow's testimonial, tries came from Danny McGuire (4), Zak Hardaker (2), Rob Burrow, Ryan Hall, Paul McShane, Kallum Watkins and Liam Hood. Man of the match was the pocket rocket himself Rob Burrow.
- 22 January 2012 – A young Leeds side mixed with a majority of U20's and some first team players beat Hunslet Hawks 22–20 at South Leeds Stadium, tries came from Ben Jones Bishop, Sean Casey, Daniel Smith and Stevie Ward.
- 26 January 2012 – Kallum Watkins signed a new 5-year contract with the club.
- 26 January 2012 – The Manchester Magic weekend schedule was announced, the Rhinos will play on Sunday 27 May vs Bradford Bulls at 4pm, all the matches will be played at Manchester City's Etihad Stadium. The full schedule is as follows:

Saturday 26 May
Sunday 27 May
1pm Castleford Tigers vs Wakefield Trinity Wildcats

3pm Warrington Wolves vs Widnes Vikings

5pm Hull F.C. vs Hull K.R.

12pm Catalans Dragons vs London Broncos

2pm Huddersfield Giants vs Salford City Reds

4pm Leeds Rhinos vs Bradford Bulls

6pm St. Helens vs Wigan Warriors

- 27 January 2012 The Rhinos announced a strong squad to play Whitehaven, the squad is as follows: 1 Jimmy Watson, 2 Ben Jones Bishop, 3 Jack Pring, 4 Jake Normington, 5 Jamel Chisholm, 6 Stevie Ward, 7 Ollie Olds, 8 Luke Ambler, 9 Sean Casey, 10 Daniel Smith, 11 Clayton Scott, 12 Jay Pitts, 13 Brad Singleton Subs: 14 Danny Bravo, 15 Matthew Syron, 16 Matthew Nicholson, 17 Kyle Quinlan, 18 Jay Leary
- 29 January 2012 Leeds Rhinos lost 34-32 vs Whitehaven.

=== February ===
- 1 February 2012 – The Rhinos announced their squad for the first game of the Super League season vs Hull K.R, the squad is as follows:

1 Brent Webb, 3 Kallum Watkins, 4 Zak Hardaker, 5 Ryan Hall, 6 Danny McGuire, 7 Rob Burrow, 8 Kylie Leuluai, 9 Paul McShane, 10 Jamie Peacock, 11 Jamie Jones Buchanan, 12 Carl Ablett, 13 Kevin Sinfield (c), 14 Lee Smith, 15 Brett Delaney, 16 Ryan Bailey, 18 Chris Clarkson, 19 Weller Hauraki, 20 Darrell Griffin, 21 Richard Moore

- 1 February 2012 – Leeds also announced that the South Stand would be sponsored by Tetley's, with the North Stand sponsored by Leeds Building Society
- 3 February 2012 – The Stobart Super League kicked off in style for the Rhinos who beat Hull K.R 34–16 at Headingley Stadium. The game marked Kevin Sinfield's 400th appearance for the club. Kallum Watkins scored a hat trick and won the man of the match award. Other tries came from Brett Delaney, Brent Webb and Danny McGuire, Kevin Sinfield kicked 5 out of 6 goals.
- 8 February 2012 – Brett Delaney signed a new 3-year contract with the club.
- 9 February 2012 The Rhinos announced an unchanged 19-man squad to play Wigan Warriors:

1 Brent Webb, 3 Kallum Watkins, 4 Zak Hardaker, 5 Ryan Hall, 6 Danny McGuire, 7 Rob Burrow, 8 Kylie Leuluai, 9 Paul McShane, 10 Jamie Peacock, 11 Jamie Jones Buchanan, 12 Carl Ablett, 13 Kevin Sinfield (c), 14 Lee Smith, 15 Brett Delaney, 16 Ryan Bailey, 18 Chris Clarkson, 19 Weller Hauraki, 20 Darrell Griffin, 21 Richard Moore

- 11 February 2012 – Leeds Rhinos lost 20-6 to Wigan Warriors in a rematch after the Wembley matchup in the Challenge Cup Final last year. However the game saw Darrell Griffin score his first Rhinos try.
- 15 February 2012 – The Rhinos announced their squad for the Heinz Big Soup World Club Challenge, the squad is as follows: 1 Brent Webb, 2 Ben Jones Bishop, 3 Kallum Watkins, 4 Zak Hardaker, 5 Ryan Hall, 6 Danny McGuire, 7 Rob Burrow, 8 Kylie Leuluai, 9 Paul McShane, 10 Jamie Peacock, 11 Jamie Jones Buchanan, 12 Carl Ablett, 13 Kevin Sinfield (c), 15 Brett Delaney, 16 Ryan Bailey, 17 Ian Kirke, 18 Chris Clarkson, 19 Weller Hauraki, 20 Darrell Griffin
- 17 February 2012 – Leeds Rhinos were crowned World Club Champions after a 26–12 victory against Manly Sea Eagles. Ryan Hall was given man of the match after scoring two tries, tries also came from Kallum Watkins, Ben Jones Bishop and Carl Ablett.
- 26 February 2012 – Leeds Rhinos beat struggling Super League new boys Widnes Vikings 44–16 at the Stobart Stadium, tries came from Ben Jones Bishop (2), Rob Burrow (2), Ryan Hall (2), Zak Hardaker and Kallum Watkins, Kevin Sinfield kicked 6/8 goals.

=== March ===
- 2 March 2012 – The Rhinos beat Castleford Tigers 36–14. Tries came from Ryan Hall (3) and Kallum Watkins. Danny McGuire scored his customary try against the Tigers and hooker Liam Hood scored a try on his debut.
- 6 March 2012 – 11 Leeds Rhinos players were announced in the England Elite train on squad, they are as follows: Jamie Peacock, Kevin Sinfield, Ryan Hall, Danny McGuire, Rob Burrow, Zak Hardaker, Ben Jones Bishop, Carl Ablett, Jamie Jones Buchanan, Ryan Bailey and Kallum Watkins. Chris Clarkson was added to the England Knights squad.
- 9 March 2012 – Champions Leeds Rhinos beat league leaders Warrington Wolves 26–18 at Headingley Stadium. Tries came from Danny McGuire, Zak Hardaker, Kallum Watkins and Liam Hood. Man of the match was Rob Burrow.
- 16 March 2012 – Leeds Rhinos beat Salford City Reds 56–16 at Salford City Stadium. Tries came from Zak Hardaker (3), Brett Delaney, Kallum Watkins, Liam Hood, Kevin Sinfield, Carl Ablett, Danny McGuire, Rob Burrow. Kevin Sinfield also broke Lewis Jones's point record to become the all-time highest point scorer at the Rhinos.
- 23 March 2012 – Jamie Peacock MBE signed a new 2-year contract which will keep him at the club until the end of the 2014 season. He also confirmed that these will be his last 2 seasons before he retires.

== Previous season results ==
=== Super League ===
Round	1	2	3	4	5	6	7	8	9	10	11	12	13	14	15	16	17	18	19	20	21	22	23	24	25	26	27
vs																											
Home/Away	N	A	H	A	H	H	A	H	A	H	A	H	A	H	H	A	H	A	H	A	A	H	A	H	A	H	A
Win/Draw/Loss	W	W	L	L	W	L	W	D	L	L	W	W	W	W	L	L	W	W	L	L	L	W	W	W	L	W	W
Result	32–28	32–18	26–36	24–40	46–12	16–30	28–8	22–22	28–38	6–38	30–22	34–16	48–6	30–6	6–42	16–42	44–14	12–7	12–18	24–26	18–38	20–0	30–22	56–0	22–32	64–20	31–24

=== Play-off results ===
Round	PO1	PO2	POSF	GF
vs				
Home/Away	H	A	A	N
Win/Draw/Loss	W	W	W	W
Result	42–10	34–28	26–24	32–16

=== Challenge Cup results ===
Round	CCR4	CCR5	CCQF	CCSF	CCF
vs					
Home/Away	H	H	A	N	N
Win/Draw/Loss	W	W	W	W	L
Result	30–20	40–20	38–22	10–8	18–28

Key:

- W=Win D=Draw L=Loss
- H=Home A=Away N=Neutral
- P01 = Play Off 1 PO2 = Play Off 2 POSF = Play Off Semi Final GF = Grand Final
- CCR4/5/QF/SF/F = Challenge Cup round 4/5/quarter Final/Semi Final/Final
- = Bradford Bulls = Castleford Tigers, = Catalans Dragons, = Crusaders, = Harlequins, Huddersfield Giants, = Hull FC, = Hull K.R, = Salford City Reds, = St. Helens, = Wakefield Trinity Wildcats, = Warrington Wolves, – Wigan Warriors

== Games ==
=== Preseason ===
==== December ====
===== Heatshot Festive Challenge =====
Leeds Rhinos 26	Wakefield Trinity Wildcats 10

Date	26 December 2011
Ground	Headingley Stadium
Attendance	9062
Referee	Matthew Thomason

Leeds Squad	1 Lee Smith, 2 Jimmy Watson, 3 Kallum Watkins, 4 Zak Hardaker, 5 Jamel Chisholm, 6 Stevie Ward, 7 Rob Burrow (c), 8 Darrell Griffin, 9 Paul McShane, 10 Ian Kirke, 11 Jay Pitts, 12 Weller Hauraki, 13 Chris Clarkson Subs 14 Liam Hood, 15 Richard Moore, 16 Brad Singleton, 17 Jared Stewart, 18 Luke Ambler, 19 Daniel Smith
Wakefield Squad	1 Richard Mathers, 24 Dale Morton, 3 Dean Collis, 4 Vince Mellars, 5 Ben Cockayne, 6 Isaac John, 20 Tim Smith, 8 Oliver Wilkes, 9 Andy Ellis, 16 Paul Johnson, 10 Andy Raleigh 22 Kyle Trout, 12 Steve Southern (c) Subs 7 Kyle Wood, 15 Kyle Amor, 18 Matt James, 19 Frankie Mariano, 22 Matt Wildie, 33 Lucas Walshaw

Leeds Tries	Chris Clarkson, Liam Hood, Kallum Watkins, Rob Burrow, Zak Hardaker
Wakefield Tries	Andy Ellis, Dean Collis
Leeds Goals	Lee Smith (2/3), Rob Burrow (1/1), Paul McShane (0/1),
Wakefield Goals	Isaac John (1/2)

==== January ====
===== York vs Leeds =====
York City Knights 26 vs Leeds Rhinos 18

Date	Friday 15 January
Ground	Huntington Stadium
Attendance	546
Referee	Jamie Bloem (Halifax)

Leeds Squad	1 Jimmy Watson, 2 Mo Agoro, 3 Jimmy Keinhorst, 4 Jake Normington, 5 Jamal Chisholm, 6 Stevie Ward, 7 Sean Casey, 8 Daniel Smith, 9 Liam Hood, 10 Matthew Syron, 11 Danny Bravo, 12 Clayton Scott, 13 Brad Singleton Subs 14 Aaron Brown, 15 Ollie Olds, 16 Colten Roche, 17 Gareth Morgan, 18 Jack Pring, 19 Ryan Smith, 20 Matthew Nicholson
York Squad	1 James Hayne, 2 Waine Pryce, 3 James Ford, 4 George Elliott, 5 Dave Sutton, 6 Brett Turner, 7 Lee Williams, 8 Adam Sullivan, 9 Jack Lee, 10 Alex Benton, 11 Rhys Clarke, 12 James Houston, 13 Jack Aldous Subs: 14 Ben Hellwell, 15 Jordan Tansey, 16 Brooke Broughton, 17 Adam Howard, 18 Jon Gay, 19 Ed Smith, 20 Davey Burn

Leeds Tries	Jamel Chisholm, Jimmy Watson, Aaron Brown
York Tries	Dave Sutton (2), Jack Lee, Adam Howard, Adam Sullivan
Leeds Goals	Sean Casey (2), Daniel Smith
York Goals	James Haynes (2), Ben Hellewell

===== Rob Burrow's testimonial =====
Leeds Rhinos 66 vs Featherstone Rovers 0

Date	Friday 20 January
Ground	Headingley Stadium
Attendance	4,106
Referee	

Leeds Squad	1 Brent Webb, 14 Lee Smith, 3 Kallum Watkins, 4 Zak Hardaker 5 Ryan Hall, 6 Danny McGuire, 7 Rob Burrow, 8 Kylie Leuluai, 9 Paul McShane, 16 Ryan Bailey, 11 Jamie Jones Buchanan, 15 Brett Delaney, 12 Carl Ablett Subs: 19 Weller Hauraki, 20 Darrell Griffin, 21 Richard Moore, 18 Chris Clarkson, 24 Liam Hood
Featherstone Squad	1 Ian Hardman, 2 Gareth Raynor, 3 Sam Smeaton, 4 Tangi Ropati, 5 Tommy Saxton, 6 Andy Kain, 7 Liam Finn, 8 Stuart Dickens, 9 Ben Kaye, 10 James Lockwood, 11 Jon Grayshon, 12 Tim Spears, 13 Matty Dale Subs 14 Thomas Carr, 15 Nathan Freer, 16 Michael Haley, 17 Andrew Bostock, Danny Grimshaw, Greg Worthington, Jack Bussey, Jack Ormondroyd, Mufaro Mvududu

Leeds Tries	Danny McGuire (4), Zak Hardaker (2), Rob Burrow, Ryan Hall, Kallum Watkins, Paul McShane, Liam Hood
Featherstone Tries	
Leeds Goals	Lee Smith 11/11
Featherstone Goals	

===== Lazenby Cup =====
Hunslet Hawks 20 vs Leeds Rhinos 22

Date	Sunday 22 January
Ground	South Leeds Stadium
Attendance	
Referee	

Leeds Squad	Jimmy Watson, 2 Ben Jones Bishop, Jimmy Keinhorst, Jack Pring, 28 Jamel Chisholm, 25 Stevie Ward, Sean Casey, Brad Singleton, Arron Brown, 26 Luke Ambler, Danny Bravo, 17 Ian Kirke, 22 Jay Pitts Subs: Ollie Olds, 30 Daniel Smith, Colton Roche, James Davies
Hunslet Squad	

Leeds Tries	Ben Jones Bishop, Sean Casey, Daniel Smith, Stevie Ward
Hunslet Tries	
Leeds Goals	Sean Casey (1/2), Daniel Smith (2/2)
Hunslet Goals	

===== Whitehaven vs Leeds =====
Whitehaven 34 vs Leeds Rhinos 32

Date	Sunday 29 January
Ground	
Attendance	
Referee	

Leeds Squad	1 Jimmy Watson, 2 Ben Jones Bishop, 3 Jack Pring, 4 Jake Normington, 5 Jamel Chisholm, 6 Stevie Ward, 7 Ollie Olds, 8 Luke Ambler, 9 Sean Casey, 10 Daniel Smith, 11 Clayton Scott, 12 Jay Pitts, 13 Brad Singleton Subs: 14 Danny Bravo, 15 Matthew Syron, 16 Matthew Nicholson, 17 Kyle Quinlan, 18 Jay Leary
Whitehaven Squad	

Leeds Tries
Whitehaven Tries
Leeds Goals
Whitehaven Goals

=== World Club Challenge ===
Leeds Rhinos 26 vs Manly Sea Eagles 12

Date	Saturday 11 February
Ground	Headingley Stadium
Attendance	21,062
Referee	Ashley Klein

Leeds Squad	1 Brent Webb, 2 Ben Jones Bishop, 3 Kallum Watkins, 4 Zak Hardaker, 5 Ryan Hall, 13 Kevin Sinfield (c), 6 Danny McGuire, 8 Kylie Leuluai, 7 Rob Burrow, 10 Jamie Peacock, 11 Jamie Jones Buchanan, 15 Brett Delaney, 12 Carl Ablett Subs 9 Paul McShane, 16 Ryan Bailey, 18 Chris Clarkson, 20 Darrell Griffin
Manly Squad	1 Brett Stewart, 2 David Williams, 3 Jamie Lyon (c), 4 Steve Matai, 5 Michael Oldfield, 6 Kieran Foran, 7 Daly Cherry-Evans, 8 Jason King, 9 Matt Ballin, 10 Brent Kite, 11 Anthony Watmough, 12 Tony Williams, 13 Glenn Stewart Subs 14 Vic Mauro, 15 Darcy Lussick, 16 Jamie Buhrer, 17 George Rose

Leeds Tries	Kallum Watkins (18), Ryan Hall (27,37), Ben Jones Bishop (76), Carl Ablett (79)
Manly Tries	Brett Stewart (33), Daly Cherry-Evans (51)
Leeds Goals	Kevin Sinfield (18,27,79)
Manly Goals	Jamie Lyon (33,51)

=== League/Challenge Cup ===
==== February ====
===== Round 1 =====
Leeds Rhinos 34 vs Hull Kingston Rovers 16

Date	3 February 2012
Ground	Headingley Stadium
Attendance	15,343
Referee	Phil Bentham

Leeds Squad	1 Brent Webb, 14 Lee Smith, 3 Kallum Watkins, 4 Zak Hardaker, 5 Ryan Hall, 13 Kevin Sinfield (c), 6 Danny McGuire, 16 Ryan Bailey, 7 Rob Burrow, 10 Jamie Peacock, 11 Jamie Jones Buchanan, 15 Brett Delaney, 12 Carl Ablett Subs: 8 Kylie Leuluai, 9 Paul McShane, 19 Weller Hauraki, 20 Darrell Griffin
KR Squad	1 Shannon McDonnell, 2 Craig Hall, 3 Kris Welham, 4 Jake Webster, 5 David Hodgson, 19 Scott Murrell, 7 Michael Dobson, 8 Joel Clinton, 14 Lincoln Withers, 23 Mickey Paea, 11 Con Mika, 18 Graeme Horne, 13 Rhys Lovegrove Subs 9 Josh Hodgson, 10 Scott Taylor, 20 Jordan Cox, 22 Scott Wheeldon

Leeds Tries	Brett Delaney (6), Brent Webb (25), Kallum Watkins (59, 64, 72), Danny McGuire (78)
KR Tries	Scott Murrell (10, 38), Kris Welham (47), David Hodgson (70)
Leeds Goals	Kevin Sinfield (5/6)
KR Goals	Michael Dobson (0/4)

===== Round 2 =====
Wigan Warriors 20 vs Leeds Rhinos 6

Date	Saturday 11 February
Ground	DW Stadium
Attendance	15,370
Referee	Thierry Albert

Leeds Squad	1 Brent Webb, 5 Ryan Hall, 12 Carl Ablett, 4 Zak Hardaker, 14 Lee Smith, 13 Kevin Sinfield (c), 6 Danny McGuire, 16 Ryan Bailey, 7 Rob Burrow, 10 Jamie Peacock, 11 Jamie Jones Buchanan, 15 Brett Delaney, 19 Weller Hauraki Subs: 8 Kylie Leuluai, Paul McShane, 18 Chris Clarkson, 20 Darrell Griffin
Wigan Squad	1 Sam Tomkins, 2 Josh Charnley, 3 Darrell Goulding, 26 Jack Hughes, 5 Pat Richards, 6 Brett Finch, 7 Thomas Leuluai, 23 Ben Flower, 9 Michael Mcllorum, 10 Lee Mossop, 11 Harrison Hansen, 12 Gareth Hock, 13 Sean O'Loughlin (c) Subs: 14 Jeff Lima, 17 Chris Tuson, 21 Epalahame Lauaki, 22 Tom Spencer

Leeds Tries	Darrell Griffin (56)
Wigan Tries	Josh Charnley (15, 29, 65)
Leeds Goals	Kevin Sinfield (56)
Wigan Goals	Pat Richards (15, 29, 49, 65)

===== Round 3 =====
Rearranged due to the World Club Challenge

Leeds Rhinos vs Wakefield Trinity Wildcats

Date	Monday 18 June
Ground	Headingley Stadium
Attendance	
Referee	

Leeds Squad
Wakefield Squad

Leeds Tries
Wakefield Tries
Leeds Goals
Wakefield Goals

===== Round 4 =====
Widnes Vikings 16 vs Leeds Rhinos 44

Date	Sunday 26 February
Ground	Halton Stadium
Attendance	6046
Referee	Steve Ganson

Leeds Squad	1 Brent Webb, 2 Ben Jones Bishop, 3 Kallum Watkins, 4 Zak Hardaker, 5 Ryan Hall, 13 Kevin Sinfield (c), 6 Danny McGuire, 8 Kylie Leuluai, 7 Rob Burrow, 20 Darrell Griffin, 15 Brett Delaney, 19 Weller Hauraki, 12 Carl Ablett Subs: 9 Paul McShane, 17 Ian Kirke, 21 Richard Moore, 22 Jay Pitts
Widnes Squad	1 Shaun Briscoe, 2 Paddy Flynn, 20 Stefan Marsh, 4 Willie Isa, 5 Patrick Ah Van, 6 Lloyd White, 7 Rhys Hanbury, 8 Ben Cross, 13 Jon Clarke, 10 Ben Davies, 11 Frank Winterstein, 21 Dave Allen, 12 Hep Cahill Subs: 15 Simon Finnigan, 17 Steve Pickersgill, 25 Danny Craven, 26 Anthony Mullally

Leeds Tries	Ben Jones Bishop (16,29), Rob Burrow (18,21), Ryan Hall (50,75), Zak Hardaker (60), Kallum Watkins (73)
Widnes Tries	Patrick Ah Van (24), Rhys Hanbury (27), Paddy Flynn (70)
Leeds Goals	Kevin Sinfield (16,18,21,50,60,75)
Widnes Goals	Patrick Ah Van (27,70)

==== March ====
===== Round 5 =====
Castleford Tigers 14 vs Leeds Rhinos 36

Date	Friday 2 March
Ground	PROBIZ Coliseum
Attendance	9237
Referee	James Child

Leeds Squad	1 Brent Webb, 2 Ben Jones Bishop, 3 Kallum Watkins, 4 Zak Hardaker, 5 Ryan Hall, 13 Kevin Sinfield (c), 6 Danny McGuire, 8 Kylie Leuluai, 7 Rob Burrow, 10 Jamie Peacock, 22 Jay Pitts, 15 Brett Delaney, 12 Carl Ablett Subs 17 Ian Kirke, 18 Chris Clarkson, 20 Darrell Griffin, 24 Liam Hood
Castleford Squad	1 Richard Owen, 2 Nick Youngquest, 23 Ryan McGoldrick, 4 Kirk Dixon, 5 Josh Griffin, 6 Rangi Chase, 7 Danny Orr, 8 Jacob Emmitt, 15 Adam Milner, 20 Grant Millington, 11 Brett Ferres, 14 Stuart Jones, 21 Oliver Holmes Subs 9 Daryl Clark, 13 Steve Snitch, 17 Lee Mitchell, 22 Nathan Massey

Leeds Tries	Ryan Hall (10,23,62), Kallum Watkins (27), Danny McGuire (74), Liam Hood (77)
Castleford Tries	Daryl Clark (34), Kirk Dixon (37), Josh Griffin (44)
Leeds Goals	Kevin Sinfield (10,23,27,62,74,77)
Castleford Goals	Kirk Dixon (34)

===== Round 6 =====
Leeds Rhinos 26 vs Warrington Wolves 18

Date	Friday 9 March
Ground	Headingley Stadium
Attendance	17,120
Referee	Richard Silverwood

Leeds Squad	1 Brent Webb, 2 Ben Jones Bishop, 3 Kallum Watkins, 4 Zak Hardaker, 5 Ryan Hall, 13 Kevin Sinfield (c), 6 Danny McGuire, 8 Kylie Leuluai, 7 Rob Burrow, 10 Jamie Peacock, 22 Jay Pitts, 15 Brett Delaney, 12 Carl Ablett Subs 16 Ryan Bailey, 18 Chris Clarkson, 20 Darrell Griffin, 24 Liam Hood
Warrington Squad	19 Stefan Ratchford, 5 Joel Monaghan, 20 Matty Blythe, 4 Ryan Atkins, 2 Chris Riley, 6 Lee Briers, 7 Richie Myler, 8 Adrian Morley, 14 Mick Higham, 10 Garreth Carvell, 11 Trent Waterhouse, 12 Ben Westwood, 16 Paul Wood Subs 17 Simon Grix, 18 Michael Cooper, 20 Chris Hill, 21 Tyrone McCarthy

Leeds Tries	Danny McGuire (22), Zak Hardaker (27), Kallum Watkins (44), Liam Hood (67)
Warrington Tries	Matty Blythe (31), Chris Hill (36), Ben Westwood (48)
Leeds Goals	Kevin Sinfield (22,27,44,53,67)
Warrington Goals	Lee Briers (31,36,48)

===== Round 7 =====
Salford City Reds 16 vs Leeds Rhinos 56

Date	Friday 16 March
Ground	Salford City Stadium
Attendance	6891
Referee	Robert Hicks

Leeds Squad	1 Brent Webb, 2 Ben Jones Bishop, 3 Kallum Watkins, 4 Zak Hardaker, 5 Ryan Hall, 13 Kevin Sinfield (c), 6 Danny McGuire, 8 Kylie Leuluai, 7 Rob Burrow, 10 Jamie Peacock, 18 Chris Clarkson, 15 Brett Delaney, 12 Carl Ablett Subs: 17 Ian Kirke, 20 Darrell Griffin, 21 Richard Moore, 24 Liam Hood
Salford Squad	1 Luke Patten, 18 Ashley Gibson, 14 Chris Nero, 3 Sean Gleeson, 5 Danny Williams, 6 Daniel Holdsworth, 7 Matty Smith, 12 Shannan McPherson, 24 Stuart Howarth, 8 Lee Jewitt, 11 Matty Ashurst, 27 Vinnie Anderson, 13 Stephen Wild Subs 16 Luke Adamson, 17 Iafeta Palea'aesina, 21 Jordan James, 23 Gareth Owen

Leeds Tries	Zak Hardaker (12,47,59), Brett Delaney (21), Kallum Watkins (24), Kevin Sinfield (26), Liam Hood (32), Danny McGuire (35), Rob Burrow (65), Carl Ablett (71)
Salford Tries	Vinnie Anderson (9), Gareth Owen (75), Luke Patten (79)
Leeds Goals	Kevin Sinfield (12,21,24,32,47,59,65,71)
Salford Goals	Daniel Holdsworth (75,79)

===== Round 8 =====
St. Helens 46 vs Leeds Rhinos 6

Date	Sunday 25 March
Ground	Langtree Park
Attendance	15,199
Referee	Phil Bentham

Leeds Squad	14 Lee Smith, 2 Ben Jones Bishop, 3 Kallum Watkins, 4 Zak Hardaker, 5 Ryan Hall, 13 Kevin Sinfield (c), 7 Rob Burrow, 8 Kylie Leuluai, 9 Paul McShane, 10 Jamie Peacock, 18 Chris Clarkson, 15 Brett Delaney, 12 Carl Ablett Subs 17 Ian Kirke, 20 Darrell Griffin, 21 Richard Moore, 25 Steve Ward
Saints Squad	1 Paul Wellens, 2 Ade Gardner, 3 Michael Shenton, 5 Francis Meli, 17 Gary Wheeler, 6 Lance Hohaia, 7 Jonny Lomax, 14 Anthony Laffranchi, 9 James Roby, 8 Josh Perry, 13 Chris Flannery, 12 Jon Wilkin, 11 Tony Puletua Subs 10 Louie McCarthy-Scarsbrook, 15 Mark Flanagan, 16 Paul Clough, 18 Shaun Magennis

Leeds Tries	Zak Hardaker (51)
Saints Tries	Ade Gardner (2,67), Jonny Lomax (6,19), Gary Wheeler (10,76), Paul Wellens (42), Lance Hohaia (63)
Leeds Goals	Kevin Sinfield (51)
Saints Goals	Jonny Lomax (2,6,10,19,42,63,67)

===== Round 9 =====
Leeds Rhinos 12 vs Huddersfield Giants 22

Date	Friday 30 March
Ground	Headingley Stadium
Attendance	15,408
Referee	

Leeds Squad	1 Brent Webb, 2 Ben Jones Bishop, 3 Kallum Watkins, 4 Zak Hardaker, 5 Ryan Hall, 13 Kevin Sinfield, 25 Stevie Ward, 8 Kylie Leuluai, 9 Paul McShane, 10 Jamie Peacock, 18 Chris Clarkson, 15 Brett Delaney, 12 Carl Ablett Subs: 14 Lee Smith, 17 Ian Kirke, 20 Darrell Griffin, 21 Richard Moore
Giants Squad	29 Greg Eden, 20 Luke George, 17 Joe Wardle, 3 Leroy Cudjoe, 5 Jermaine McGillvary, 1 Scott Grix, 7 Danny Brough, 8 Eorl Crabtree, 9 Luke Robinson, 12 David Fa'alogo, 18 Jason Chan, 4 Lee Gilmour, 19 Tommy Lee Subs: 2 Michael Lawrence, 11 Luke O'Donnell, 13 David Faiumu, 15 Larne Patrick

Leeds Tries	Zak Hardaker (26), Kylie Leuluai (68)
Giants Tries	Eorl Crabtree (32), Jason Chan (38), Greg Eden (54), Jermaine McGillvary (?)
Leeds Goals	Kevin Sinfield (26,68)
Giants Goals	Danny Brough (32,38,54)

==== April ====
===== Round 10 =====
Bradford Bulls 12 vs Leeds Rhinos 4

Date	Friday 6 April
Ground	Grattan Stadium
Attendance	20,851
Referee	Ben Thaler

Leeds Squad	1 Brent Webb, 2 Ben Jones Bishop, 3 Kallum Watkins, 4 Zak Hardaker, 5 Ryan Hall, 13 Kevin Sinfield, 25 Stevie Ward, 20 Darrell Griffin, 9 Paul McShane, 10 Jamie Peacock, 15 Brett Delaney, 18 Chris Clarkson, 12 Carl Ablett Subs 8 Kylie Leuluai, 14 Lee Smith, 16 Ryan Bailey 17 Ian Kirke
Bradford Squad	1 Brett Kearney, 33 Karl Pryce, 2 Adrian Purtell, 3 Keith Lulia, 18 Shaun Ainscough, 22 Jarrod Sammut, 6 Ben Jeffries, 16 Manase Manuokafoa, 14 Matt Diskin, 15 Bryn Hargreaves, 11 Olivier Elima, 12 Elliott Whitehead, 13 Jamie Langley Subs 9 Heath L'Estrange, 21 Tom Burgess, 23 Danny Addy, 34 Phil Joseph

Leeds Tries	Zak Hardaker (14)
Bradford Tries	Jamie Langley (65), Ben Jeffries (74)
Leeds Goals	
Bradford Goals	Jarrod Sammut (64,74)

===== Round 11 =====
Leeds Rhinos 52 vs London Broncos 10

Date	Monday 9 April
Ground	Headingley Stadium
Attendance	13,109
Referee	Rob Hicks

Leeds Squad	1 Brent Webb, 2 Ben Jones Bishop, 12 Carl Ablett, 4 Zak Hardaker, 5 Ryan Hall, 13 Kevin Sinfield, 14 Lee Smith, 20 Darrell Griffin, 7 Rob Burrow, 10 Jamie Peacock, 18 Chris Clarkson, 15 Brett Delaney, 16 Ryan Bailey Subs: 8 Kylie Leuluai, 9 Paul McShane, 17 Ian Kirke, 23 Brad Singleton
London Squad	5 Michael Robertson, 21 Kieran Dixon, 3 Jamie O'Callaghan, 19 Dan Sarginson, 2 Liam Colbon, 6 Michael Witt, 7 Craig Gower, 8 Antonio Kaufusi, 9 Chad Randall, 13 Tony Clubb, 20 Matt Cook, 11 Shane Rodney, 12 Chris Bailey Subs: 1 Luke Dorn, 10 Mark Bryant, 15 Karl Temata,

Leeds Tries	Carl Ablett (26), Ben Jones Bishop (31,39), Ryan Hall (36,55,62,70), Brent Webb (74), Zak Hardaker (75,78)
London Tries	Kieran Dixon (45), Luke Dorn (48)
Leeds Goals	Kevin Sinfield (31,55,62,74,75,78)
London Goals	Michael Witt (48)

===== Challenge Cup round 4 =====
Leeds Rhinos 38 vs Wakefield Trinity Wildcats 18

Date	Monday 18 June
Ground	Headingley Stadium
Attendance	7,140
Referee	Richard Silverwood

Leeds Squad	1 Brent Webb, 2 Ben Jones Bishop, 12 Carl Ablett, 4 Zak Hardaker, 5 Ryan Hall, 13 Kevin Sinfield, 6 Danny McGuire, 8 Kylie Leuluai, 7 Rob Burrow, 10 Jamie Peacock, 18 Chris Clarkson, 15 Brett Delaney, 16 Ryan Bailey Subs 9 Paul McShane, 14 Lee Smith, 17 Ian Kirke, 20 Darrell Griffin
Wakefield Squad	1 Richie Mathers, 2 Peter Fox, 34 Paul Sykes, 3 Dean Collis, 5 Ben Cockayne, 13 Danny Washbrook, 20 Tim Smith, 10 Andy Raleigh, 7 Kyle Wood, 15 Kyle Amor, 17 Danny Kirmond, 33 Lucas Walshaw, 14 Paul Aiton Subs 4 Vince Mellars, 6 Isaac John, 8 Oliver Wilkes, 25 Matt James

Leeds Tries	Ryan Bailey (24), Danny McGuire (47), Zak Hardaker (58), Carl Ablett (69), Paul McShane (72), Ben Jones Bishop (75)
Wakefield Tries	Kyle Amor (19), Danny Kirmond (31), Isaac John (79)
Leeds Goals	Kevin Sinfield (24,47,58,75)
Wakefield Goals	Paul Sykes (19,31,79)

===== Round 12 =====
Leeds Rhinos 34 vs Catalans Dragons 18

Date	Friday 20 April
Ground	Headingley Stadium
Attendance	
Referee	Ben Thaler

Leeds Squad	1 Brent Webb, 2 Ben Jones Bishop, 12 Carl Ablett, 4 Zak Hardaker, 5 Ryan Hall, 13 Kevin Sinfield (c), 6 Danny McGuire, 8 Kylie Leuluai, 31 Shaun Lunt, 10 Jamie Peacock, 15 Brett Delaney, 18 Chris Clarkson, 16 Ryan Bailey Subs: 14 Lee Smith, 17 Ian Kirke, 20 Darrell Griffin, 21 Richard Moore
Catalan Squad	18 Daryl Millard, 28 Damien Cardace, 14 Sebastien Raguin, 25 Vincent Duport, 5 Cyril Stacul, 3 Leon Pryce, 7 Scott Dureau, 23 Lopini Paea, 9 Ian Henderson, 10 Rémi Casty, 11 Steve Menzies, 12 Louis Anderson, 4 Setaimata Sa Subs: 20 Michael Simon, 22 Jamal Fakir, 24 Jason Baitieri, 26 Ben Fisher

Leeds Tries	Ben Jones Bishop (3,27), Ryan Hall (11), Zak Hardaker (49), Shaun Lunt (59), Ryan Bailey (63)
Catalan Tries	Louis Anderson (23), Steve Menzies (51), Leon Pryce (77)
Leeds Goals	Kevin Sinfield (3,11,49,59,63)
Catalan Goals	Scott Dureau (23,51,77)

===== Challenge Cup round 5 =====
Salford City Reds vs Leeds Rhinos

Date	Sunday 29 April
Ground	Salford City Stadium
Attendance	
Referee	Steve Ganson

Leeds Squad	1 Brent Webb, 2 Ben Jones Bishop, 12 Carl Ablett, 4 Zak Hardaker, 5 Ryan Hall, 13 Kevin Sinfield (c), 6 Danny McGuire, 8 Kylie Leuluai, 31 Shaun Lunt, 10 Jamie Peacock, 18 Chris Clarkson, 15 Brett Delaney, 16 Ryan Bailey Subs: 14 Lee Smith, 17 Ian Kirke, 20 Darrell Griffin, 21 Richard Moore
Salford Squad	1 Luke Patten, 2 Jodie Broughton, 3 Sean Gleeson, 4 Joel Moon, 18 Ashley Gibson, 6 Daniel Holdsworth, 7 Matty Smith, 15 Adam Sidlow, 9 Wayne Godwin, 10 Lee Jewitt, 11 Matty Ashurst, 16 Luke Adamson, 13 Stephen Wild Subs 14 Chris Nero, 17 Iafeta Paleaaesina, 21 Jordan James, 24 Stuart Howarth

Leeds Tries	Brent Webb (36), Ben Jones Bishop (63), Shaun Lunt (70)
Salford Tries	Lee Jewitt (6), Jodie Broughton (50)
Leeds Goals	Kevin Sinfield (36,70)
Salford Goals	Daniel Holdsworth (6)

==== May ====
===== Round 13 =====
Hull F.C. 34 vs Leeds Rhinos 20

Date	Saturday 5 May
Ground	KC Stadium
Attendance	11,677
Referee	James Child

Leeds Squad	1 Brent Webb, 2 Ben Jones Bishop, 12 Carl Ablett, 4 Zak Hardaker, 5 Ryan Hall, 13 Kevin Sinfield 9c), 6 Danny McGuire, 8 Kylie Leuluai, 31 Shaun Lunt, 10 Jamie Peacock, 18 Chris Clarkson, 11 Jamie Jones Buchanan Subs 14 Lee Smith, 17 Ian Kirke, 20 Darrell Griffin, 21 Richard Moore
Hull Squad	36 Matty Russell, 2 Will Sharp, 23 Ben Crooks, 15 Richard Whiting, 5 Tom Briscoe, 19 Jordan Turner, 7 Brett Seymour, 11 Sam Moa, 9 Danny Houghton, 10 Andy Lynch, 11 Willie Manu, 12 Danny Tickle, 34 Jay Pitts Subs 8 Mark O'Meley, 16 Eamon O'Carroll, 20 Jamie Ellis, 22 Martin Aspinwall

Leeds Tries	Ben Jones Bishop (12), Carl Ablett (23), Ryan Hall (67), Danny McGuire (79)
Hull Tries	Danny Tickle (14), Will Sharp (26), Tom Briscoe (31,76), Ben Crooks (77)
Leeds Goals	Kevin Sinfield (23,79)
Hull Goals	Danny Tickle (14,26,31,50,65,76,77)

===== Challenge Cup Quarter Final =====
Leigh Centurions 12 vs Leeds Rhinos 60

Date	Friday 11 May
Ground	Leigh Sports Village
Attendance	5,290
Referee	Ben Thaler

Leeds Squad	1 Brent Webb, 2 Ben Jones Bishop, 14 Lee Smith, 4 Zak Hardaker, 5 Ryan Hall, 13 Kevin Sinfield (c), 6 Danny McGuire, 8 Kylie Leuluai, 7 Rob Burrow, 17 Ian Kirke, 19 Weller Hauraki, 11 Jamie Jones Buchanan, 18 Chris Clarkson Subs: 9 Paul McShane, 16 Ryan Bailey, 21 Richard Moore, 31 Shaun Lunt
Leigh Squad	1 McNally, 2 Maden, 3 Littler, 4 Gardner, 5 Pownall, 6 Ridyard, 7 Beswick, 8 Parker, 9 Nicholson, 10 Ostick, 12 Goulden, 11 Laithwaite, 13 Nash Subs 14 Brierly, 15 Briscoe, 16 Hopkins, 17 Gallagher

Leeds Tries	Danny McGuire (12), Brent Webb (20), Ben Jones Bishop (31), Ryan Hall (35,79), Rob Burrow (48), Shaun Lunt (55), Kevin Sinfield (58,74), Lee Smith (71)
Leigh Tries	Tommy Goulden (14), Greg McNally (62)
Leeds Goals	Kevin Sinfield (12,20,31,35,48,55,58,71,74,79)
Leigh Goals	Martyn Ridyard (14,62)

===== Round 14 =====
Leeds Rhinos 18 vs St. Helens 31

Date	Monday 21 May
Ground	Headingley Stadium
Attendance	
Referee	Steve Ganson

Leeds Squad	1 Brent Webb, 14 Lee Smith, 3 Kallum Watkins, 4 Zak Hardaker, 5 Ryan Hall, 13 Kevin Sinfield. 6 Danny McGuire, 8 Kylie Leuluai, 7 Rob Burrow, 10 Jamie Peacock, 11 Jamie Jones Buchanan, 15 Brett Delaney, 12 Carl Ablett Subs: 31 Shaun Lunt, 16 Ryan Bailey, 18 Chris Clarkson, 31 Shaun Lunt
Saints Squad	1 Paul Wellens, 21 Thomas Makinson, 3 Michael Shenton, 17 Gary Wheeler, 5 Francis Meli, 6 Lance Hohaia, 7 Jonny Lomax, 8 Josh Perry, 9 James Roby, 14 Anthony Laffranchi, 4 Sia Soliola, 12 Jon Wilkin, 13 Chris Flannery Subs 10 Louie McCarthy-Scarsbrook, 11 Tony Puletua, 15 Mark Flanagan, 16 Paul Clough

Leeds Tries	Danny McGuire (12), Brett Delaney (38), Jamie Jones Buchanan (48)
Saints Tries	Jonny Lomax (21,58), Paul Wellens (31), Tommy Makinson (51), Jon Wilkin (65)
Leeds Goals	Kevin Sinfield (12,38,48)
Saints Goals	Tommy Makinson (21,31,58), Jonny Lomax (65,73)
Leeds Drop Goals	
Saints Drop Goals	Jonny Lomax (75)

===== Round 15 Magic Weekend =====
Bradford Bulls 22 vs Leeds Rhinos 37

Date	Sunday 27 May
Ground	Etihad Stadium
Attendance	
Referee	Thierry Alibert

Leeds Squad	1 Brent Webb, 14 Lee Smith, 3 Kallum Watkins, 4 Zak Hardaker, 5 Ryan Hall, 13 Kevin Sinfield. 6 Danny McGuire, 8 Kylie Leuluai, 31 Shaun Lunt, 10 Jamie Peacock, 11 Jamie Jones Buchanan, 12 Carl Ablett, 15 Brett Delaney Subs: 7 Rob Burrow, 16 Ryan Bailey, 19 Weller Hauraki, 21 Richard Moore
Bradford Squad	1 Brett Kearney, 5 Elliot Kear, 2 Adrian Purtell, 3 Keith Lulia, 33 Karl Pryce, 6 Ben Jeffries, 7 Luke Gale, 15 Bryn Hargreaves, 14 Matt Diskin, 10 Craig Kopczak, 11 Olivier Elima, 12 Elliott Whitehead, 26 John Bateman Subs: 4 Chev Walker, 9 Heath L'Estrange, 16 Manase Manuokafoa, 21 Tom Burgess

Leeds Tries	Danny McGuire (2,22,31,47,73), Carl Ablett (69)
Bradford Tries	Elliott Whitehead (8), Ben Jeffries (12), Matt Diskin (18), Elliot Kear (76)
Leeds Goals	Kevin Sinfield (2,22,31,47,69,73)
Bradford Goals	Luke Gale (8,12,18)
Leeds Drop Goals	Kevin Sinfield (72)
Bradford Drop Goals	

==== June ====
===== Round 16 =====
Leeds Rhinos vs Wigan Warriors

Date	Friday 1 June
Ground	Headingley Stadium
Attendance	
Referee	James Childs

Leeds Squad
Wigan Squad

Leeds Tries
Wigan Tries
Leeds Goals
Wigan Goals

===== Round 17 =====
Warrington Wolves vs Leeds Rhinos

Date	Sunday 10 June
Ground	Halliwell Jones Stadium
Attendance	
Referee	

Leeds Squad
Warrington Squad

Leeds Tries
Warrington Tries
Leeds Goals
Warrington Goals

===== Round 18 =====
Leeds Rhinos vs Castleford Tigers

Date	Sunday 24 June
Ground	Headingley Stadium
Attendance	
Referee	

Leeds Squad
Castleford Squad

Leeds Tries
Castleford Tries
Leeds Goals
Castleford Goals

== Result Round by Round ==
Round	1	2	3	4	5	6	7	8	9	10	11	12	13	14	15	16	17	18	19	20	21	22	23	24	25	26	27
vs																											
Home/Away	H	A	H	A	A	H	A	A	H	A	H	H	A	H	N	H	A	H	A	H	H	A	A	H	A	H	A
Win/Draw/Loss	W	L	TBC	W	W	W	W	L	L	L	W	W	L	L	W												
Result	34-16	6-20	TBC	44-16	36-14	26-18	56-16	6-46	12-22	4-12	52-10	34-18	20-34	18-31	37-22												

- = Bradford Bulls = Castleford Tigers, = Catalans Dragons, Huddersfield Giants, = Hull FC, = Hull K.R, London Broncos, = Salford City Reds, = St. Helens, = Wakefield Trinity Wildcats, = Warrington Wolves, – Wigan Warriors, = Widnes Vikings

== Team statistics ==
=== Player appearances ===
FB=Fullback	C=Centre	W=Winger	SO=Stand Off	SH=Scrum half	P=Prop	H=Hooker	SR=Second Row	LF=Loose forward	B=Bench	S=Suspended

No	Player	1	2	WCC	4	5	6	7	8	9	10	11	CCR4	12	CCR5	13	CCQF	14	15
1	Brent Webb	FB	FB	FB	FB	FB	FB	FB			FB	FB	FB	FB	FB	FB	FB	FB	FB
2	Ben Jones Bishop	X	X	WG	WG	WG	WG	WG	WG	FB	WG	WG	WG	WG	WG	WG	WG		
3	Kallum Watkins	CE		CE	CE	CE	CE	CE	CE	CE	CE							CE	CE
4	Zak Hardaker	CE	CE	CE	CE	CE	CE	CE	CE	CE	CE	CE	CE	CE	CE	CE	CE	CE	CE
5	Ryan Hall	WG	WG	WG	WG	WG	WG	WG	WG	WG	WG	WG	WG	WG	WG	WG	WG	WG	WG
6	Danny McGuire	SH	SH	SH	SH	SH	SH	SH					SH	SH	SH	SH	SH	SH	SH
7	Rob Burrow	HK	HK	HK	HK	HK	HK	HK	SH			HK	HK				HK	HK	B
8	Kylie Leuluai	B	B	PR	PR	PR	PR	PR	PR	PR	B	B	PR	PR	PR	PR	PR	PR	PR
9	Paul McShane	B	B	B	B	X	X	X	HK	HK	HK	B	B	X	X	X	B	X	X
10	Jamie Peacock	PR	PR	PR	X	PR	PR	PR	PR	PR	PR	PR	PR	PR	PR	PR	X	PR	PR
11	Jamie Jones Buchanan	SR	SR	SR												SR	LF	SR	SR
12	Carl Ablett	LF	CE	LF	LF	LF	LF	LF	LF	LF	LF	CE	CE	CE	CE	CE		LF	SR
13	Kevin Sinfield	SO	SO	SO	SO	SO	SO	SO	SO	SO	SO	SO	SO	SO	SO	SO	SO	SO	SO
14	Lee Smith	WG	WG					X	FB	WG	B	SH	B	B	B	B	CE	WG	WG
15	Brett Delaney	SR	SR	SR	SR	SR	SR	SR	SR	SR	SR	SR	SR	SR	SR			SR	LF
16	Ryan Bailey	PR	PR	B			B	S	S	S	B	LF	LF	LF	LF		B	B	B
17	Ian Kirke	X	X	X	B	B	X	B	B	B	B	B	B	B	B	B	PR	X	X
18	Chris Clarkson	X	B	B	X	B	B	B	SR	SR	SR	SR	SR	SR	SR	SR	LF	B	X
19	Weller Hauraki	B	LF	X	SR												SR	X	B
20	Darrell Griffin	B	B	B	PR	B	B	B	B	B	PR	PR	B	B	B	B		B	X
21	Richard Moore	X	X	X	B	X	X	B	B	B				B	B	B	B	X	B
23	Brad Singleton	X	X	X	X	X	X	X	X	X	X	B	S	X	X	X	X	X	X
24	Liam Hood	X	X	X	X	B	B	B	X	B	X	X	X	X	X	X	X	X	X
25	Stevie Ward	X	X	X	X	X	X	X	B	SH	SH	X	X	X	X	X	X	X	X
26	Luke Ambler	X	X	X	X	X	X	X	X	X	X	X	X	X	X	X	X	X	X
27	Luke Briscoe	X	X	X	X	X	X	X	X	X	X	X	X	X	X	X	X	X	X
28	Jamel Chisholm	X	X	X	X	X	X	X	X	X	X	X	X	X	X	X	X	X	X
29	Jared Stewart	X	X	X	X	X	X	X	X	X	X	X	X	X	X	X	X	X	X
30	Daniel Smith	X	X	X	X	X	X	X	X	X	X	X	X	X	X	X	X	X	X
31	Shaun Lunt	X	X	X	X	X	X	X	X	X	X	X	X	HK	HK	HK	B	B	HK

=== Player statistics ===
- Appearances for competitive matches only

==== Super League ====
Position	Number	Nationality	Name	Apps (Sub)	Tries	Goals	Points	Metres	Penalties	Yellow card	Red card
FB	1	(New Zealand)	Brent Webb	12	2	0	8	0	0	0	0
WG	2	(England)	Ben Jones Bishop	10	7	0	28	0	0	0	0
CE	3	(England)	Kallum Watkins	9	7	0	28	0	0	0	0
CE	4	(England)	Zak Hardaker	14	11	0	44	0	0	0	0
WG	5	(England)	Ryan Hall	14	11	0	44	0	0	0	0
SO	6	(England)	Danny McGuire	10	11	0	44	0	0	0	0
SH	7	(England)	Rob Burrow	9 (1)	3	0	12	0	0	0	0
PR	8	(Samoa)	Kylie Leuluai	10 (4)	1	0	4	0	0	0	0
HK	9	(England)	Paul McShane	3 (4)	0	0	0	0	0	0	0
PR	10	(England)	Jamie Peacock	13	0	0	0	0	0	0	0
SR	11	(England)	Jamie Jones Buchanan	5	1	0	4	0	0	0	0
SR	12	(England)	Carl Ablett	14	4	0	16	0	0	0	0
LF	13	(England)	Kevin Sinfield (c)	14	1	56	117	0	0	0	0
WG	14	(England)	Lee Smith	7 (3)	0	0	0	0	0	0	0
SR	15	(Australia)	Brett Delaney	13	3	0	12	0	0	0	0
PR	16	(England)	Ryan Bailey	4 (4)	1	0	4	0	0	0	0
PR	17	(England)	Ian Kirke	0 (9)	0	0	0	0	0	0	0
SR	18	(England)	Chris Clarkson	7 (4)	0	0	0	0	0	0	0
SR	19	(New Zealand)	Weller Hauraki	2 (2)	0	0	0	0	0	0	0
PR	20	(England)	Darrell Griffin	3 (10)	1	0	4	0	0	0	0
PR	21	(England)	Richard Moore	0 (7)	0	0	0	0	0	0	0
PR	23	(England)	Brad Singleton	0 (1)	0	0	0	0	0	0	0
HK	24	(England)	Liam Hood	0 (4)	3	0	12	0	0	0	0
LF	25	(England)	Stevie Ward	2 (1)	0	0	0	0	0	0	0
PR	26	(England)	Luke Ambler	0	0	0	0	0	0	0	0
SO	27	(England)	Luke Briscoe	0	0	0	0	0	0	0	0
WG	28	(England)	Jamel Chisholm	0	0	0	0	0	0	0	0
SR	29	(England)	Jared Stewart	0	0	0	0	0	0	0	0
SR	30	(England)	Daniel Smith	0	0	0	0	0	0	0	0
HK	31	(England)	Shaun Lunt	3	1	0	4	0	0	0	0

==== Challenge Cup ====
Position	Number	Nationality	Name	Apps	Tries	Goals	Points	Metres	Penalties	Yellow card	Red card
FB	1	(New Zealand)	Brent Webb	3	1	0	4	0	0	0	0
WG	2	(England)	Ben Jones Bishop	3	2	0	8	0	0	0	0
CE	3	(England)	Kallum Watkins	0	0	0	0	0	0	0	0
CE	4	(England)	Zak Hardaker	3	2	0	8	0	0	0	0
WG	5	(England)	Ryan Hall	3	2	0	8	0	0	0	0
SO	6	(England)	Danny McGuire	3	2	0	8	0	0	0	0
SH	7	(England)	Rob Burrow	2	1	0	4	0	0	0	0
PR	8	(Samoa)	Kylie Leuluai	3	0	0	0	0	0	0	0
HK	9	(England)	Paul McShane	0 (2)	1	0	4	0	0	0	0
PR	10	(England)	Jamie Peacock	2	0	0	0	0	0	0	0
SR	11	(England)	Jamie Jones Buchanan	1	0	0	0	0	0	0	0
SR	12	(England)	Carl Ablett	2	1	0	4	0	0	0	0
LF	13	(England)	Kevin Sinfield (c)	3	2	15	38	0	0	0	0
WG	14	(England)	Lee Smith	1 (2)	1	0	4	0	0	0	0
SR	15	(Australia)	Brett Delaney	2	0	0	0	0	0	0	0
PR	16	(England)	Ryan Bailey	2 (1)	1	0	4	0	0	0	0
PR	17	(England)	Ian Kirke	1 (2)	0	0	0	0	0	0	0
SR	18	(England)	Chris Clarkson	3	0	0	0	0	0	0	0
SR	19	(New Zealand)	Weller Hauraki	1	0	0	0	0	0	0	0
PR	20	(England)	Darrell Griffin	0 (2)	0	0	0	0	0	0	0
PR	21	(England)	Richard Moore	0 (2)	0	0	0	0	0	0	0
PR	23	(England)	Brad Singleton	0	0	0	0	0	0	0	0
HK	24	(England)	Liam Hood	0	0	0	0	0	0	0	0
LF	25	(England)	Stevie Ward	0	0	0	0	0	0	0	0
PR	26	(England)	Luke Ambler	0	0	0	0	0	0	0	0
SO	27	(England)	Luke Briscoe	0	0	0	0	0	0	0	0
WG	28	(England)	Jamel Chisholm	0	0	0	0	0	0	0	0
SR	29	(England)	Jared Stewart	0	0	0	0	0	0	0	0
SR	30	(England)	Daniel Smith	0	0	0	0	0	0	0	0
HK	31	(England)	Shaun Lunt	2	2	0	8	0	0	0	0

==== Overall ====
- (includes Super League, Challenge Cup and World Club Challenge)

Position	Number	Nationality	Name	Apps (Sub)	Tries	Goals	Points	Metres	Penalties	Yellow card	Red card
FB	1	(New Zealand)	Brent Webb	16	3	0	12	0	0	0	0
WG	2	(England)	Ben Jones Bishop	14	10	0	40	0	0	0	0
CE	3	(England)	Kallum Watkins	10	8	0	32	0	0	0	0
CE	4	(England)	Zak Hardaker	18	13	0	52	0	0	0	0
WG	5	(England)	Ryan Hall	18	15	0	60	0	0	0	0
SO	6	(England)	Danny McGuire	14	13	0	28	0	0	0	0
SH	7	(England)	Rob Burrow	12 (1)	4	0	16	0	0	0	0
PR	8	(Samoa)	Kylie Leuluai	14 (4)	1	0	4	0	0	0	0
HK	9	(England)	Paul McShane	3 (7)	1	0	4	0	0	0	0
PR	10	(England)	Jamie Peacock	16	0	0	0	0	0	0	0
SR	11	(England)	Jamie Jones Buchanan	7	1	0	4	0	0	0	0
SR	12	(England)	Carl Ablett	17	6	0	24	0	0	0	0
LF	13	(England)	Kevin Sinfield (c)	18	3	74	161	0	0	0	0
WG	14	(England)	Lee Smith	8 (5)	1	0	4	0	0	0	0
SR	15	(Australia)	Brett Delaney	16	3	0	12	0	0	0	0
PR	16	(England)	Ryan Bailey	6 (6)	2	0	8	0	0	0	0
PR	17	(England)	Ian Kirke	1 (11)	0	0	0	0	0	0	0
SR	18	(England)	Chris Clarkson	10 (5)	0	0	0	0	0	0	0
SR	19	(New Zealand)	Weller Hauraki	3 (2)	0	0	0	0	0	0	0
PR	20	(England)	Darrell Griffin	3 (13)	1	0	4	0	0	0	0
PR	21	(England)	Richard Moore	0 (9)	0	0	0	0	0	0	0
PR	23	(England)	Brad Singleton	0 (1)	0	0	0	0	0	0	0
HK	24	(England)	Liam Hood	0 (4)	3	0	12	0	0	0	0
LF	25	(England)	Stevie Ward	2 (1)	0	0	0	0	0	0	0
PR	26	(England)	Luke Ambler	0	0	0	0	0	0	0	0
SO	27	(England)	Luke Briscoe	0	0	0	0	0	0	0	0
WG	28	(England)	Jamel Chisholm	0	0	0	0	0	0	0	0
SR	29	(England)	Jared Stewart	0	0	0	0	0	0	0	0
SR	30	(England)	Daniel Smith	0	0	0	0	0	0	0	0
HK	31	(England)	Shaun Lunt	5	3	0	12	0	0	0	0

==== Leeds Super League top scorers ====
===== Top try scorers =====
	Player	Tries
1	Zak Hardaker	11
2	Ryan Hall	10
3	Kallum Watkins	7
4	Ben Jones Bishop	6
5	Danny McGuire	4

	Player	Points
1	Kevin Sinfield	94
2	Zak Hardaker	44
3	Ryan Hall	40
4	Kallum Watkins	28
5	Ben Jones Bishop	24

== Super League statistics ==
=== Table ===
Super League XVII
Pos	Team	Pld	W	D	L	PF	PA	PD	Pts	Qualification
1	Wigan Warriors (L)	27	21	0	6	994	449	+545	42	Play-offs
2	Warrington Wolves	27	20	1	6	909	539	+370	41	Play-offs
3	St Helens	27	17	2	8	795	480	+315	36	Play-offs
4	Catalans Dragons	27	18	0	9	812	611	+201	36	Play-offs
5	Leeds Rhinos (C)	27	16	0	11	823	662	+161	32	Play-offs
6	Hull F.C.	27	15	2	10	696	621	+75	32	Play-offs
7	Huddersfield Giants	27	14	0	13	699	664	+35	28	Play-offs
8	Wakefield Trinity Wildcats	27	13	0	14	633	764	−131	26	Play-offs
9	Bradford Bulls	27	14	1	12	633	756	−123	23 (Note: Bradford Bulls deducted 6 points on 25 July 2012 for entering administration)	
10	Hull Kingston Rovers	27	10	1	16	753	729	+24	21	
11	Salford City Reds	27	8	1	18	618	844	−226	17	
12	London Broncos	27	7	0	20	588	890	−302	14	
13	Castleford Tigers	27	6	0	21	554	948	−394	12	
14	Widnes Vikings	27	6	0	21	532	1082	−550	12	

Source: superleague.co.uk and BBC Sport.
Rules for classification: 1st on competition points; 2nd on match points difference.
Competition points: for win = 2; for draw = 1; for loss = 0.
(C) Champions; (L) League Leaders' Shield Winners

=== Super League top try scorers ===
	Player	Team	Tries
1	Josh Charnley	Wigan Warriors	13
2	Zak Hardaker	Leeds Rhinos	11
3	Ryan Atkins	Warrington Wolves	11
4	Luke George	Huddersfield Giants	11
5	Ryan Hall	Leeds Rhinos	10

=== Top goal scorer ===
	Player	Teams	Goals
1	Danny Brough	Huddersfield Giants	53
2	Scott Dureau	Catalans Dragons	50
3	Danny Tickle	Hull F.C.	46
4	Kevin Sinfield	Leeds Rhinos	44
5	Pat Richards	Wigan Warriors	41

=== Top metres ===
	Player	Teams	Metres
1	Luke George	Huddersfield Giants	759
2	Sam Tomkins	Wigan Warriors	756
3	James Roby	St. Helens	724
4	Josh Griffin	Castleford Tigers	699
5	Jermaine McGillvary	Huddersfield Giants	634

=== Top carries ===
	Player	Teams	Carries
1	James Roby	St. Helens	149
2	Rangi Chase	Castleford Tigers	115
3	Sam Tomkins	Wigan Warriors	109
4	Jonny Lomax	St. Helens	107
5	Richard Owen	St. Helens	99

=== Top tackler ===
	Player	Teams	Tackles
1	Rhys Lovegrove	Hull K.R	211
2	James Roby	St. Helens	188
3	Paul Aiton	Wakefield Trinity Wildcats	185
4	Jamie Langley	Bradford Bulls	180
5	Stephen Wild	Salford City Reds	179

== 2013 season ==
=== Squad ===
Position	Player	Contract
FB	Luke Briscoe	2014
WG	Ben Jones Bishop	2014
WG	Ryan Hall	2016
WG	Lee Smith	2013
WG	Jamal Chisholm	2013
CE	Kallum Watkins	2016
CE	Zak Hardaker	2016
CE	Jimmy Keinhorst	-
SO	Kevin Sinfield (c)	2014
SH	Danny McGuire	2013
PR	Kylie Leuluai	2013
PR	Jamie Peacock	2013
PR	Ryan Bailey	2012
PR	Darrell Griffin	2014
PR	Richard Moore	2014
PR	Ian Kirke	2013
PR	Brad Singleton	2013
PR	Luke Ambler	2012
HK	Rob Burrow	2013
HK	Paul McShane	2015
HK	Liam Hood	2015
SR	Jamie Jones Buchanan	2014
SR	Carl Ablett	2013
SR	Brett Delaney	2015
SR	Weller Hauraki	2013
SR	Chris Clarkson	2016
SR	Jared Stewart	2013
SR	Daniel Smith	2013
LF	Stevie Ward	2015

=== Player movements ===
==== Outs ====
- Brent Webb (Released)
- Shaun Lunt (loan return, Huddersfield Giants)
