= Michael Clarkson (rugby league) =

English rugby league footballer

Personal information
- Full name: Michael Clarkson

Playing information
- Position: Prop
Club
Years	Team	Pld	T	G	FG	P
1995/96–97	Wakefield Trinity	56	14	0	0	56
1998–2001	Featherstone Rovers	21+42	10	0	0	40
	Total	119	24	0	0	96
- Relatives: Chris Clarkson (son)

Michael "Micky" Clarkson is a former professional rugby league footballer who played in the 1990s and 2000s. He played at club level for Stanley Rangers ARLFC, Wakefield Trinity, and Featherstone Rovers, as a prop.

== Playing career ==
=== Club career ===
Michael Clarkson made his début for Featherstone Rovers on Tuesday 5 May 1998.
