= 2011 Super League Grand Final =

St. Helens	Leeds Rhinos
16	32
	1	2	Total
ST H	2	14	16
LEE	8	24	32
- Date: 8 October 2011
- Stadium: Old Trafford
- Location: Manchester
- Harry Sunderland Trophy: Rob Burrow (Leeds Rhinos)
- Headliners: Feeder
- Referee: Phil Bentham
- Attendance: 69,107

Broadcast partners
- Broadcasters: Sky Sports
- Commentators: Eddie Hemmings; Mike Stephenson; Phil Clarke; Shaun McRae

The 2011 Super League Grand Final was the 14th official grand final and the championship-deciding game of the Super League XVI season. It was held on Saturday, 8 October at Manchester, England's Old Trafford stadium. The match was contested by St. Helens and the Leeds Rhinos, who last faced each other in a grand final in 2009. British rock band Feeder were due to provide the pre-match music entertainment, only for their show to be called off due to the pitch being wet and Manchester United manager Alex Ferguson not allowing a stage to be built on the pitch. Leeds won the game by 32 points to 16.

== Background ==
St Helens had finished the regular season in 3rd place with 37 points while Leeds had finished 5th with 31 points.

#	Team	Pld	W	D	L	PF	PA	PD	Pts
3	St. Helens	27	17	3	7	782	515	+267	37
5	Leeds Rhinos	27	15	1	11	757	603	+154	31

=== Route to the Final ===
==== St Helens ====
St Helens
Round	Opposition	Score
Qualifying Play-off	Wigan Warriors (A)	26–18
Semi-Final	Wigan Warriors (H)	26–18
Key: (H) = Home venue; (A) = Away venue.

==== Leeds Rhinos ====
Leeds
Round	Opposition	Score
Qualifying Play-off	Hull F.C. (H)	42–10
Preliminary Semi-Final	Huddersfield Giants (A)	34–28
Semi-Final	Warrington Wolves (A)	26–24
Key: (H) = Home venue; (A) = Away venue.

== Match details ==
8 October 2011
18:00 UTC+1

St. Helens	16–32	Leeds Rhinos
Tries: Thomas Makinson, Michael Shenton; Goals: Jamie Foster (4)	Report	Tries: Rob Burrow, Brent Webb, Ryan Hall, Carl Ablett, Zak Hardaker; Goals: Kevin Sinfield (6)

Old Trafford, Manchester
Attendance: 69,107
Referee: Phil Bentham
Player of the Match: Rob Burrow

St Helens		Position	Leeds Rhinos	
1	(England) Paul Wellens (c)	Fullback	1	(New Zealand) Brent Webb
27	(England) Thomas Makinson	Winger	23	(England) Ben Jones-Bishop
3	(England) Michael Shenton	Centre	27	(England) Zak Hardaker
5	(Samoa) Francis Meli	Centre	12	(England) Carl Ablett
22	(England) Jamie Foster	Winger	5	(England) Ryan Hall
25	(England) Lee Gaskell	Stand-off	13	(England) Kevin Sinfield (c)
20	(England) Jonny Lomax	Scrum half	6	(England) Danny McGuire
10	(England) James Graham (c)	Prop	8	(New Zealand) Kylie Leuluai
9	(England) James Roby	Hooker	9	(Australia) Danny Buderus
11	(New Zealand) Tony Puletua	Prop	10	(England) Jamie Peacock
12	(England) Jon Wilkin	2nd Row	11	(England) Jamie Jones-Buchanan
4	(Samoa) Iosia Soliola	2nd Row	3	(Australia) Brett Delaney
16	(England) Paul Clough	Loose forward	21	(England) Chris Clarkson
17	(England) Gary Wheeler	Interchange	7	(England) Rob Burrow
14	(England) Scott Moore	Interchange	14	(New Zealand) Ali Lauitiiti
15	(Ireland) Louie McCarthy-Scarsbrook	Interchange	16	(England) Ryan Bailey
19	(England) Andrew Dixon	Interchange	17	(England) Ian Kirke
	(Australia) Royce Simmons	Coach		(England) Brian McDermott

== World Club Challenge ==
The World Club Challenge was set to take place between the winner of the Super League Grand Final, Leeds Rhinos and the winner of the NRL Grand Final, Manly-Warringah Sea Eagles on 17 February 2012, at Headingley Carnegie Stadium.
