= George Griffin (rugby league) =

English rugby league footballer

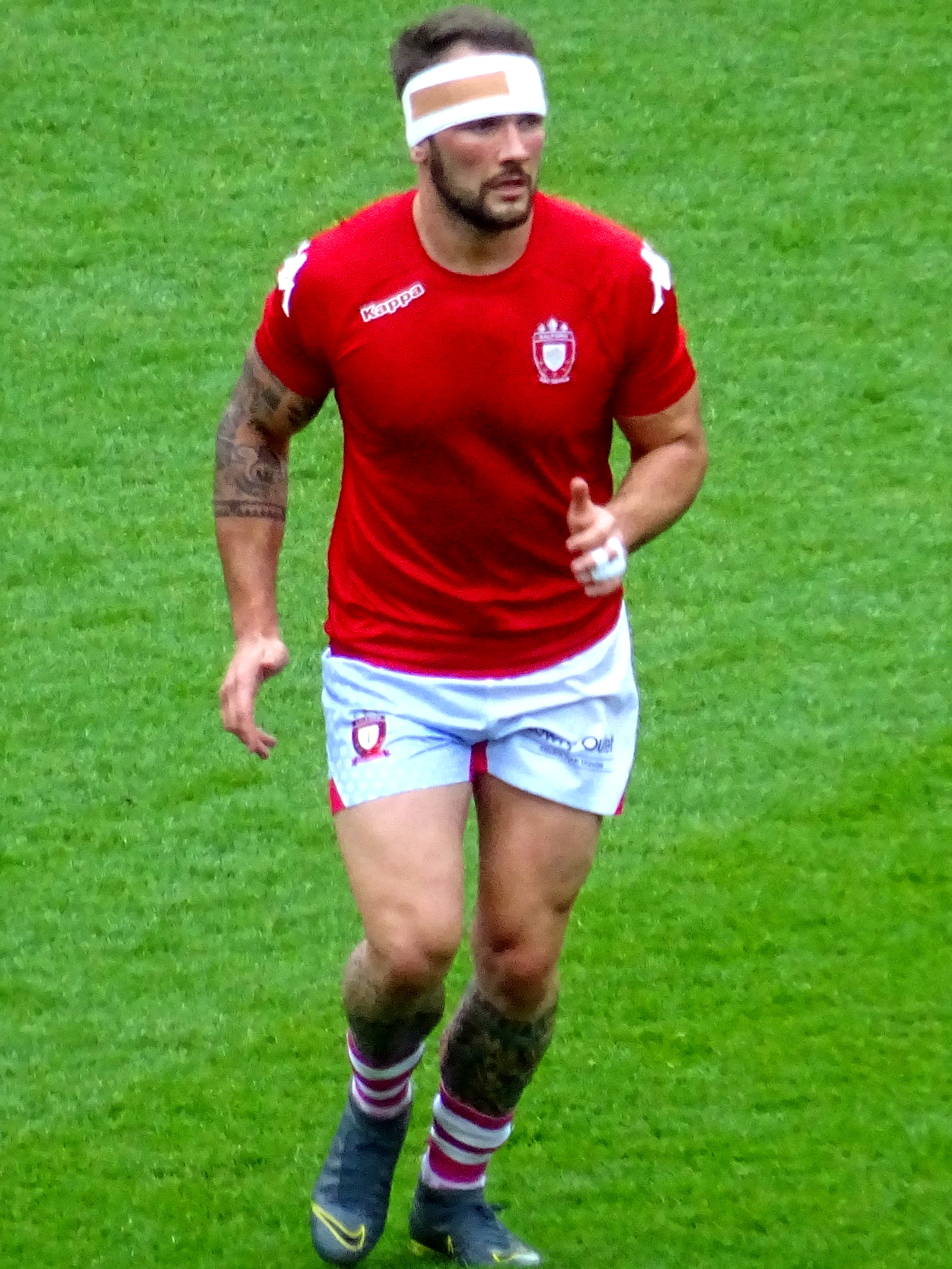

Personal information
- Full name: George Martin Ivor Griffin
- Born: 26 June 1992 (age 34) Oxford, Oxfordshire, England
- Height: 6 ft 2 in (1.88 m)
- Weight: 17 st 5 lb (110 kg)

Playing information
- Position: Prop, Second-row
Club
Years	Team	Pld	T	G	FG	P
2012–13	Hull Kingston Rovers	20	0	0	0	0
2013(DR)	→ Gateshead Thunder	3	2	0	0	8
2014	London Broncos	20	1	0	0	4
2015–19	Salford Red Devils	114	23	0	0	92
2015(loan)	→ Wakefield Trinity Wildcats	5	0	0	0	0
2020–25	Castleford Tigers	110	6	0	0	24
2026–	Sheffield Eagles	0	0	0	0	0
	Total	272	32	0	0	128
- Source: As of 16 October 2025
- Relatives: Darrell Griffin (brother); Josh Griffin (brother)

George Griffin (born 26 June 1992) is an English professional rugby league footballer who plays as a prop or second-row forward for Sheffield Eagles in the RFL Championship.

He has previously played for Hull Kingston Rovers, London Broncos, Salford Red Devils, and Castleford Tigers in the Super League. He has spent time at Gateshead Thunder in the Championship 1 on dual registration from Hull KR, and at Wakefield Trinity Wildcats in the Super League on loan from Salford.

== Background ==
Griffin was born in Oxford, Oxfordshire, England. He is the younger brother to Josh and Darrell Griffin.

Griffin previously played rugby union while growing up in Oxford, before moving to rugby league alongside his brothers. He played as a junior for Stanley Rangers.

In October 2023, working together with former Castleford teammate Bureta Faraimo, Griffin released a children's book titled Harvey Hippo Finds His Talent. His follow-up book, Harvey Hippo Joins The Band, was commissioned in May 2024 and released in October 2024.

== Career ==
=== Hull Kingston Rovers ===
Griffin signed for Hull Kingston Rovers on a two-year deal in September 2011. He had been playing in Australia for the Queanbeyan Kangaroos, a feeder team to the Canberra Raiders, and was originally set to sign for Crusaders until they withdrew from Super League.

Griffin made his Super League debut for Hull KR against the Widnes Vikings on 29 July 2012. He went on to make a total of 20 appearances throughout his 2 seasons at Hull KR.

==== Gateshead Thunder (dual registration) ====
In 2013, Griffin played for Gateshead Thunder in the Championship 1 through their dual registration agreement with Hull KR. He made 3 appearances and scored 2 tries for the Thunder.

=== London Broncos ===
In January 2014, it was announced that Griffin had signed for the London Broncos. He made 20 appearances and scored 1 try in the 2014 season.

=== Salford Red Devils ===
In July 2014, shortly after London's relegation from Super League was mathematically confirmed, Griffin signed a one-year deal to join the Salford Red Devils for 2015. He would be joining his older brothers Darrell and Josh who already played for the club.

Griffin played alongside both of his brothers for the first time at the 2015 Magic Weekend against the Widnes Vikings, just days after the death of their father. He signed a two-year contract extension with Salford in June 2015.

In May 2017, Griffin agreed a new two-year contract with Salford, keeping him at the club until the end of 2019.

He played in the 2019 Super League Grand Final defeat to St Helens at Old Trafford.

Griffin made 115 appearances and scored 20 tries during his time at Salford.

==== Wakefield Trinity Wildcats (loan) ====
Griffin joined the Wakefield Trinity Wildcats on a one-month loan deal in March 2015, making 5 appearances.

=== Castleford Tigers ===
In July 2019, Griffin signed a two-year deal to join the Castleford Tigers from 2020. Head coach Daryl Powell described him as a "tough hard-working player" with a "first-class work rate and attitude".

Griffin was assigned squad number 16 for 2020. He made his Castleford debut on 2 February against the Toronto Wolfpack. He scored his first try for the club against Hull FC in the 6th round of the Challenge Cup.

In May 2021, Griffin extended his contract with the Tigers for a further year. On 17 July 2021, he played for Castleford in their 2021 Challenge Cup final loss against St Helens.

Griffin was rewarded for his impressive performances in the 2022 season with a three-year contract extension in July. He made 26 appearances and scored 4 tries as the Tigers finished 7th, narrowly missing out on the play-offs. At the club's end-of-season awards, Griffin was named runner-up for the Player of the Year award.

Griffin played 21 games for Castleford in the 2023 Super League season as the club finished 11th on the table narrowly avoiding relegation.

On 28 June 2025, Griffin made his 100th appearance for Castleford in round 16 against the Wigan Warriors. In September, Castleford's Director of Rugby Chris Chester confirmed that Griffin would depart the club upon the expiry of his contract at the end of the 2025 season.

=== Sheffield Eagles ===
On 16 October 2025, Griffin signed for Sheffield Eagles in the RFL Championship from 2026 on a 2-year deal.

== Club statistics ==
Appearances and points in all competitions by year
Club	Season	Tier	App	T	G	DG	Pts
Hull Kingston Rovers	2012	Super League	4	0	0	0	0
Hull Kingston Rovers	2013	Super League	16	0	0	0	0
Hull Kingston Rovers	Total		20	0	0	0	0
→ Gateshead Thunder (DR)	2013	Championship 1	3	2	0	0	8
London Broncos	2014	Super League	20	1	0	0	4
Salford Red Devils	2015	Super League	19	3	0	0	12
Salford Red Devils	2016	Super League	32	7	0	0	28
Salford Red Devils	2017	Super League	25	4	0	0	16
Salford Red Devils	2018	Super League	13	4	0	0	16
Salford Red Devils	2019	Super League	25	5	0	0	20
Salford Red Devils	Total		114	23	0	0	92
→ Wakefield Trinity Wildcats (loan)	2015	Super League	5	0	0	0	0
Castleford Tigers	2020	Super League	14	1	0	0	4
Castleford Tigers	2021	Super League	17	1	0	0	4
Castleford Tigers	2022	Super League	26	4	0	0	16
Castleford Tigers	2023	Super League	22	0	0	0	0
Castleford Tigers	2024	Super League	9	0	0	0	0
Castleford Tigers	2025	Super League	22	0	0	0	0
Castleford Tigers	Total		110	6	0	0	24
Sheffield Eagles	2026	Championship	0	0	0	0	0
Career total			272	32	0	0	128

As of match played 19 September 2025
