= Ben Jones-Bishop =

Jamaica international rugby league footballer

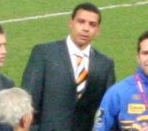

Personal information
- Full name: Ben Jones-Bishop
- Born: 24 August 1988 (age 38) Leeds, West Yorkshire, England
- Height: 6 ft 2 in (1.88 m)
- Weight: 13 st 3 lb (84 kg)

Playing information
- Position: Wing, Fullback
Club
Years	Team	Pld	T	G	FG	P
2008–14	Leeds Rhinos	83	56	0	0	224
2010(loan)	→ Harlequins RL	18	11	0	0	44
2015	Salford Red Devils	25	16	3	0	70
2016–20	Wakefield Trinity	116	64	0	0	256
2021	York City Knights	19	9	0	0	36
2022–24	Sheffield Eagles	92	60	0	0	240
2025–	York Knights	23	29	0	0	116
	Total	376	245	3	0	986
Representative
Years	Team	Pld	T	G	FG	P
2012	England Knights	2	0	0	0	0
2018–	Jamaica	7	5	0	0	20
- Source: As of 27 October 2025

Ben Jones-Bishop (born 24 August 1988) is a Jamaica international rugby league footballer who plays as a winger or fullback for the York Knights in the Betfred Super League.

He played for the Leeds Rhinos in the Super League, and on loan from Leeds at Harlequins RL in the top flight. Jones-Bishop has also played for the Salford Red Devils and Wakefield Trinity in the Super League, and has played for the England Knights at international level.

== Background ==
Jones-Bishop was born in Leeds, West Yorkshire, England. He is of Jamaican descent.

== Playing career ==
=== Leeds ===
After impressing for the club's academy team, he made his début for the Leeds club in April 2008, in the victory over the Crusaders in the Rugby League Challenge Cup. He was awarded the Man of the Match for his performance. He went on to make a further three appearances before going on loan to Harlequins for the 2010 season.

Jones-Bishop impressed during his season at Harlequins, scoring 11 tries in 18 games, before returning to the Leeds side for the 2011 season. Jones-Bishop scored a hat trick in Leeds' 32-28 Millennium Magic, scoring a penalty try, after being brought down off the ball by Gareth Raynor to give Leeds the win. He also won the man of the match award.

Jones-Bishop played on the wing and scored a try for Leeds in the 2011 Challenge Cup Final defeat by Wigan at Wembley Stadium.

He finished off Super League XVI by playing on the wing in Leeds' 32-16 2011 Super League Grand Final victory over St Helens at Old Trafford in Manchester.

He then was a late replacement on the wing for Leeds 26-12 victory in the 2012 World Club Challenge win over National Rugby League premiers Manly at Headingley, scoring the winning try in the 76th minute off after good work by Rob Burrow, and a Kallum Watkins pass that pushed Leeds' lead out to an unbeatable 20-12.

He played in the 2012 Challenge Cup Final defeat by Warrington at Wembley Stadium. He played in the 2012 Super League Grand Final victory over Warrington at Old Trafford.

=== Salford ===
On 10 May 2014, Jones-Bishop announced he'd leave the Leeds club at the end of the season after rejecting a new deal to remain at the club. It was believed he was unhappy with the amount of playing time he had at the club. It was announced that he would join Salford for the 2015 season. He played 25 games for Salford in 2015 scoring 15 tries.

=== Wakefield Trinity ===
On 5 November 2015 it was announced that he would be joining Wakefield Trinity on a one-year deal in 2016.

=== York City Knights ===
On 26 January 2021 it was reported that he had signed for York City in the RFL Championship.

=== Sheffield Eagles ===
On 17 November 2021 it was reported that he had signed for Sheffield in the RFL Championship.

=== York Knights (re-join) ===
On 5 March 2025 it was reported that he had rejoined York Knights in the RFL Championship.

== International career ==
In the second match of Jamaica's 2021 Rugby League World Cup campaign, Jones-Bishop scored Jamaica's first ever try at the tournament during their 68-6 loss to New Zealand at the MKM Stadium.
