= Matt James (rugby league) =

Wales international rugby league footballer

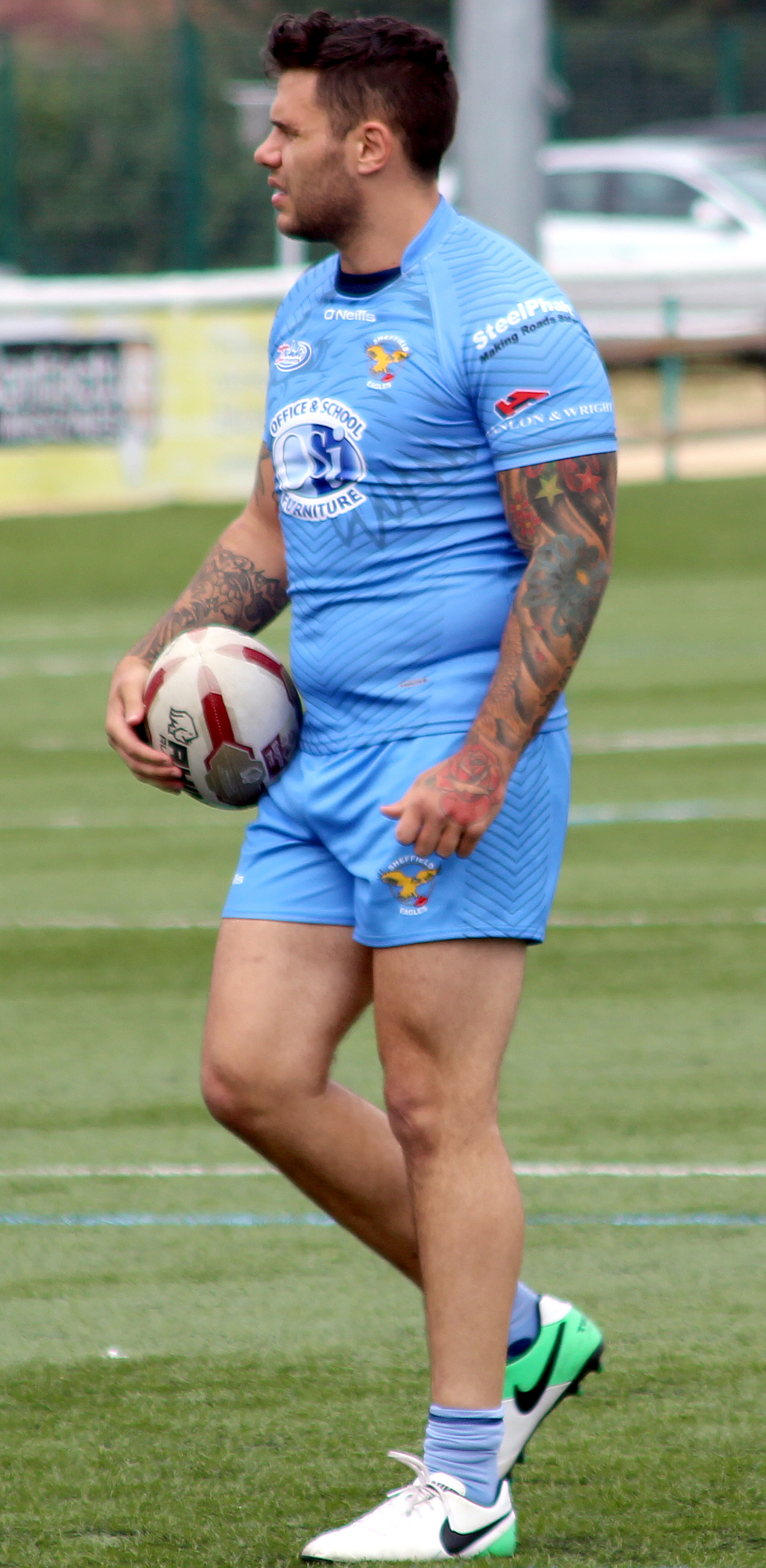

Personal information
- Full name: Matthew James
- Born: 26 March 1987 (age 39) Wakefield, West Yorkshire, England
- Height: 6 ft 2 in (188 cm)
- Weight: 16 st 7 lb (105 kg)

Playing information
- Position: Prop, Second-row, Loose forward
Club
Years	Team	Pld	T	G	FG	P
2006–09	Bradford Bulls	27	0	0	0	0
2009(loan)	→ Halifax	10	6	0	0	24
2010	Harlequins RL	3	0	0	0	0
2010–11	Barrow Raiders	32	7	0	0	28
2012	Wakefield Trinity Wildcats	5	0	0	0	0
2012(loan)	→ Halifax	1	0	0	0	0
2013–15	Featherstone Rovers	75	16	0	0	64
2016–21	Sheffield Eagles	113	16	0	0	64
	Total	266	45	0	0	180
Representative
Years	Team	Pld	T	G	FG	P
2007–21	Wales	3	1	0	0	0
- Source: As of 19 September 2021

Matt James (born 26 March 1987) is a retired Wales international rugby league. He played in the Super League for Harlequins RL and the Bradford Bulls, and in the Co-operative Championship for the Barrow Raiders, Featherstone Rovers and Sheffield Eagles.

== Background ==
James was born in Wakefield, West Yorkshire, England.

== Early career ==
James made great progress after joining Bradford from Eastmoor on the advice of Brian McDermott. He represented the Senior side in his first two seasons whilst still eligible for the Junior Academy. James has played for both England and Yorkshire in his junior career.

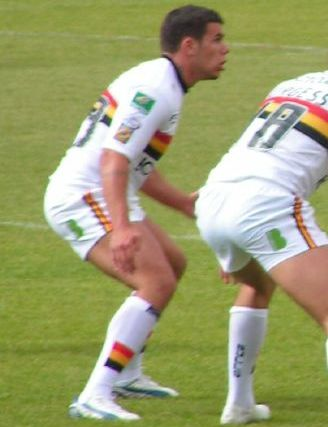
James in action for Bradford

== Bradford Bulls ==
James played for Bradford Bulls for three years, between 2006 and 2009.

It was announced in September 2008 that James would be loaned to Halifax for the 2009 season, but returned to Bradford early in February 2009 having played just ten games for 'Fax'.

== Harlequins RL ==
James signed for the London club in 2010, but failed to settle in the capital and was released from his contract after just three games. In March of the same he had his contract with Harlequins RL cancelled by mutual consent after an ineffective spell at the club.

== Barrow Raiders ==
After leaving 'Quins' he moved to the Barrow Raiders, spending two seasons with the Cumbrian club. In this spell he played a total of 32 game sin which he scored 7 tries.

== Wakefield Trinity Wildcats ==
James returned to the Super League to sign for the Wakefield Trinity Wildcats in 2012. However, the return did not pan out well, as after playing 5 games at the top the level he was loaned to Halifax for a second time. This time James only made one appearance in his loan spell in a 36-6 victory over the Dewsbury Rams. All six games he played in for both sides were substitute appearances.

== Featherstone Rovers ==
In November 2012, James left the Wakefield Trinity Wildcats and signed a two-year contract with Featherstone Rovers. He finally found a long-term team again and played a total of 75 games for Featherstone Rovers, he scored 16 tries during the course of these games.

== Sheffield Eagles ==
He commenced playing for the Sheffield Eagles in 2016. In his second season with the Eagles, James was announced to be the 2017 season captain for the team. However, the Eagles made little improvement from the following season as they finished the regular season in 7th place. In 2021 it was announced James would retire from the game at the end of the season.

== International ==
In 2007 James was given some extra games and made 12 appearances and ended 2007 with a call up to the Wales team for the 2008 World Cup qualifiers. He was named in the Wales squad to face England at the Keepmoat Stadium, Doncaster, prior to England's departure for the 2008 Rugby League World Cup, but had to withdraw through injury.
