= Thomas Carr (rugby league) =

English rugby league footballer

Personal information
- Full name: Thomas Carr
- Born: 16 July 1991 (age 34)

Playing information
Club
Years	Team	Pld	T	G	FG	P
2010–12	Featherstone Rovers	5	2	0	0	8
2013	York City Knights	28	6	69	0	152
2014	Whitehaven	22	6	17	0	58
2015–17	Doncaster	41	9	133	2	304
	Total	96	23	219	2	522

Thomas "Tom" Carr (born 16 July 1991) is a professional rugby league footballer who has played in the 2010s. He has played at club level for Featherstone Rovers, York City Knights, Whitehaven, and Doncaster.

== Playing career ==
Thomas Carr made his début for Featherstone Rovers on Thursday 4 March 2010.
