= Richard Moore (rugby league) =

English rugby league footballer

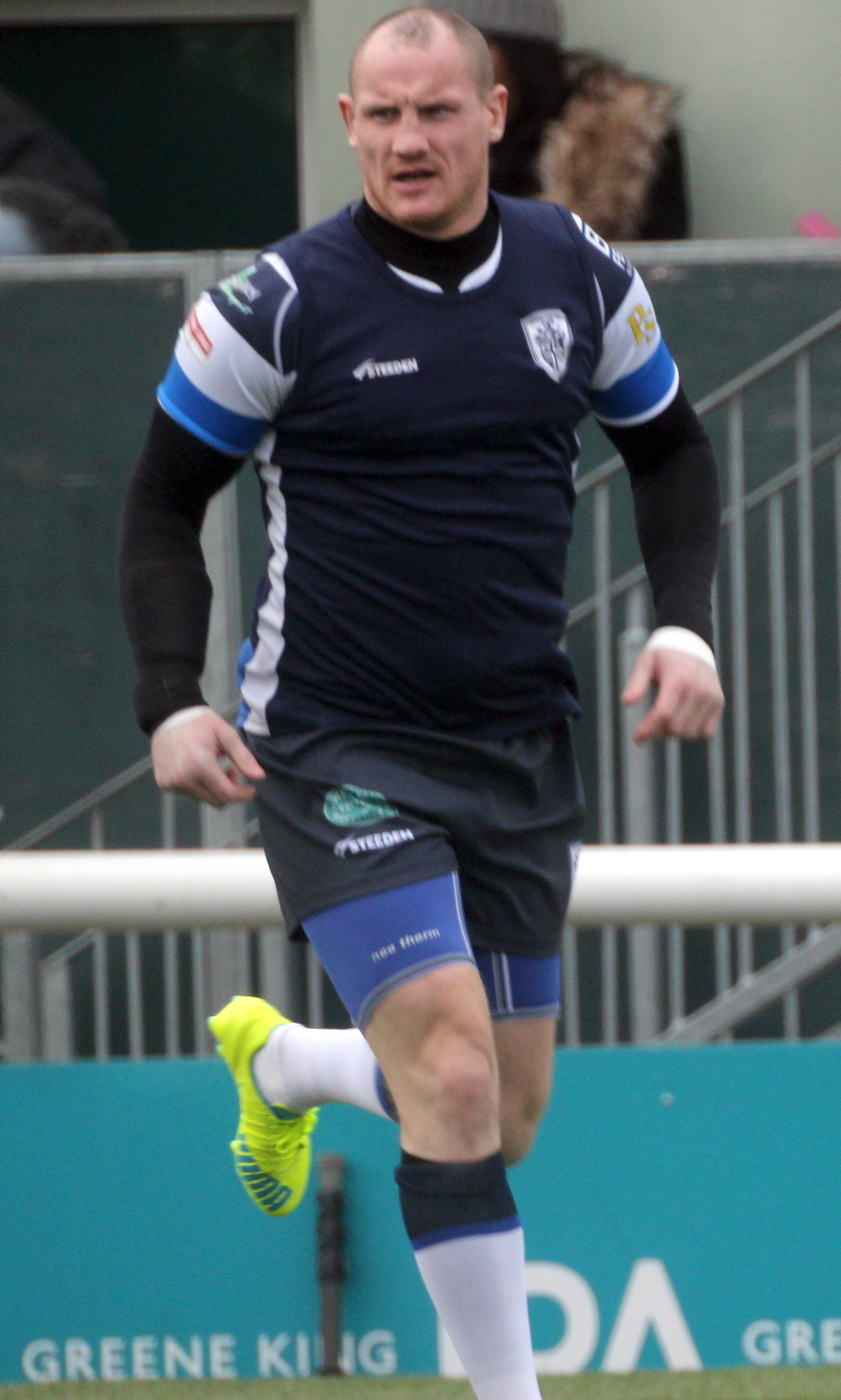

Personal information
- Born: 2 February 1981 (age 44) Keighley, West Yorkshire, England
- Height: 6 ft 3 in (1.91 m)
- Weight: 17 st 0 lb (108 kg)

Playing information
- Position: Prop, Second-row
Club
Years	Team	Pld	T	G	FG	P
2001–04	Bradford Bulls	27	0	0	0	0
2002(loan)	→ Keighley Cougars	7	0	0	0	0
2002(loan)	→ London Broncos	8	2	0	0	8
2004(loan)	→ London Broncos	7	0	0	0	0
2005–06	Leigh Centurions	17	5	0	0	20
2007–10	Wakefield Trinity Wildcats	101	9	0	0	36
2011	Crusaders RL	22	1	0	0	4
2012–13	Leeds Rhinos	32	1	0	0	4
2013(loan)	→ Hunslet Hawks	7	1	0	0	4
2014	Wakefield Trinity Wildcats	16	2	0	0	8
2014	Hunslet Hawks	6	3	0	0	12
2015–16	Halifax	55	2	0	0	8
2017–18	Featherstone Rovers	44	1	0	0	4
2019	Hunslet	1	0	0	0	0
	Total	350	27	0	0	108
- Source: As of 18 May 2018

Richard Moore (born 2 February 1981) is an English former professional rugby league footballer who last played as a prop for Hunslet in League 1.

== Background ==
Moore was born in Keighley, West Yorkshire, England

== Playing career ==
He previously played for the Bradford Bulls, London Broncos, Leigh Centurions, Wakefield Trinity Wildcats, Crusaders RL, Leeds Rhinos, Halifax and Featherstone Rovers.

Moore originally started his career in the Leeds Rhinos Academy but never made a first team appearance. He then played for Bradford Bulls, London Broncos and Leigh Centurions, before joining Wakefield Trinity ahead of the 2007 season. Moore missed the start of the 2009 season after being diagnosed with Crohn's disease. He left Wakefield at the end of the 2010 season to join Crusaders.

On 12 August 2011, Moore re-signed for Leeds, the club where he began his career as an academy player, but failed to make a first team appearance. He then had a second spell at Wakefield Trinity Wildcats in the 2014 season.
