= Sam Smeaton =

English rugby league footballer (born 1988)

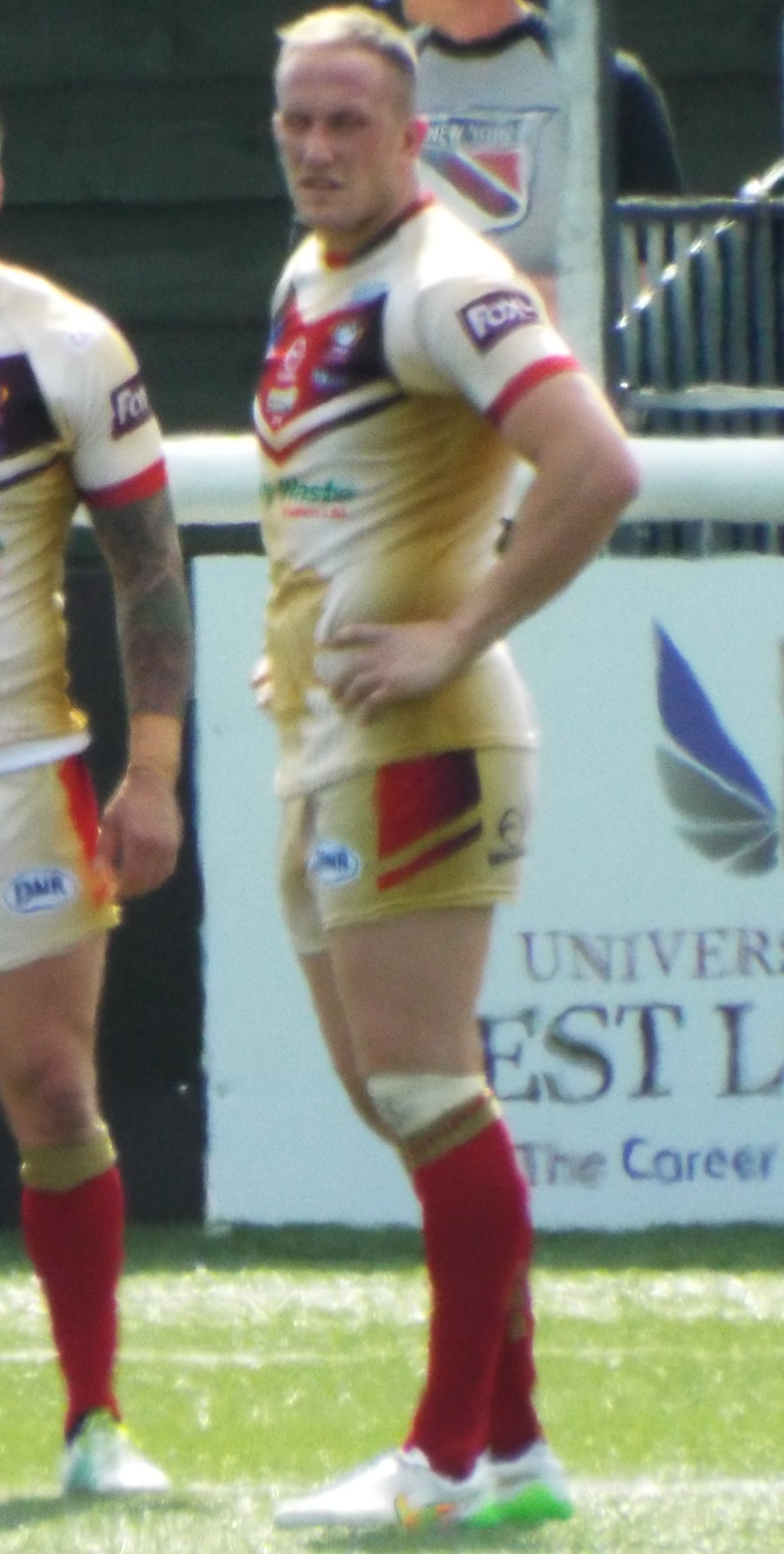

Personal information
- Full name: Sam Smeaton
- Born: 26 October 1988 (age 37)
- Height: 6 ft 1 in (185 cm)
- Weight: 14 st 7 lb (92 kg)

Playing information
- Position: Centre
Club
Years	Team	Pld	T	G	FG	P
2009–14	Featherstone Rovers	88	38	0	0	153
2015	Sheffield Eagles	30	7	0	0	28
2016	Halifax	12	6	0	0	24
2016–19	Batley Bulldogs	40	9	1	0	38
2016(loan)	→ York City Knights	3	1	0	0	4
2020–	Doncaster	126	47	0	0	188
	Total	299	108	1	0	435
- Source: As of 7 January 2023

Sam Smeaton (born 26 October 1988) is a professional rugby league footballer who plays as a centre for Doncaster in the Betfred Championship.

He previously played for Featherstone Rovers and the Sheffield Eagles in the Championship. Smeaton also played for the Batley Bulldogs in the Championship and spent time on loan from Batley at the York City Knights in League 1.

== Background ==
Smeaton played as an amateur for the Featherstone Lions.

== Career ==
Smeaton joined Featherstone Rovers in 2009. He missed the entire 2013 season due to injury caused by faulty gear being used during a game.

== Statistics ==
Season	Team	Apps	Tries	Goals	DG	Points
2009	Featherstone Rovers	16	5	0	0	20
2010	Featherstone Rovers	12	5	0	0	20
2011	Featherstone Rovers	30	13	0	0	52
2012	Featherstone Rovers	28	15	0	0	60
2013	Featherstone Rovers	0	0	0	0	0
2014	Featherstone Rovers	2	0	0	0	0
2020	Doncaster RLFC	4	0	0	0	0
2021	Doncaster RLFC	20	6	0	0	24
2022	Doncaster RLFC	25	9	0	0	36
2023	Doncaster RLFC	24	21	0	0	84
2024	Doncaster RLFC	18	3	0	0	12
2025	Doncaster RLFC	23	5	0	0	20
2026	Doncaster RLFC	12	3	0	0	12
2026	Hunslet	1	1	0	0	4
Total		215	86	0	0	321
