= George Elliot (rugby league) =

English rugby league footballer

Personal information
- Full name: George Elliot
- Born: 21 September 1991 (age 33)

Playing information
- Position: Wing, Centre
Club
Years	Team	Pld	T	G	FG	P
2011	Leeds Rhinos	1	0	0	0	0
2011(loan)	→Keighley Cougars	3	3	0	0	12
2012–14	York City Knights	43	19	0	0	76
	Total	47	22	0	0	88

George Elliott (born 1991) is an English rugby league footballer currently playing for the York City Knights in the Co-operative Championship. He previously played in the Super League for Leeds Rhinos and is, by preference, a centre but can also play on the wing. Elliott originally played Rugby union for Leeds Carnegie and played for England U16s and U18s, as well as playing for England U16 and U18 at rugby league. Elliott signed a dual code contract where he played for both Leeds Carnegie and Leeds Rhinos academies. He made his début for the Leeds Rhinos in 2011 with a win over Crusaders RL.
