= Kyle Wood (rugby league) =

English rugby league footballer

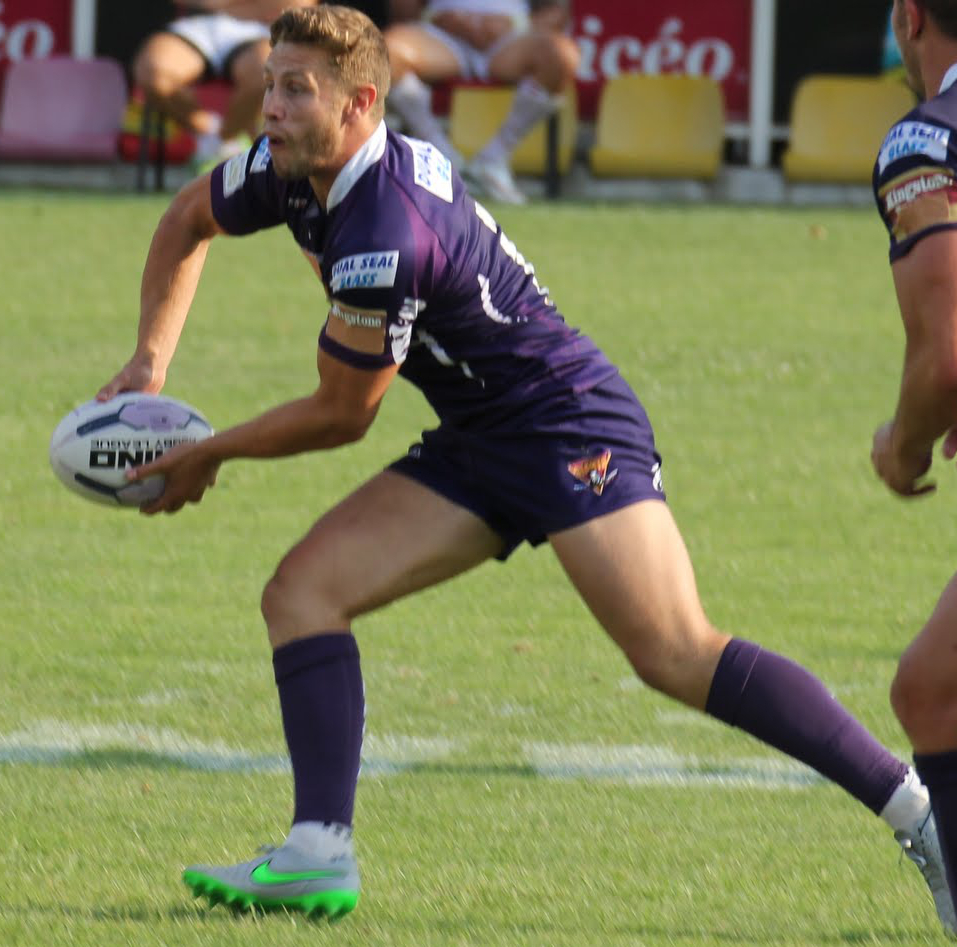

Personal information
- Full name: Kyle Wood
- Born: 18 June 1989 (age 36); Castleford, West Yorkshire, England

Playing information
- Height: 5 ft 7 in (1.70 m)
- Weight: 12 st 13 lb (82 kg)
- Position: Hooker, Scrum-half
Club
Years	Team	Pld	T	G	FG	P
2008	Doncaster	26	8	0	0	32
2009	Sheffield Eagles	26	8	0	0	32
2011	Huddersfield Giants	8	0	0	0	0
2010(loan)	→ Batley Bulldogs	10	2	0	0	8
2010(loan)	→ Castleford Tigers	5	0	0	0	0
2011(loan)	→ Sheffield Eagles	8	2	0	0	8
2012–13	Wakefield Trinity Wildcats	46	9	1	0	38
2013–16	Huddersfield Giants	74	11	0	0	44
2017–21	Wakefield Trinity	119	18	0	0	72
2022–23	Halifax Panthers	24	2	0	0	8
2024	Sheffield Eagles	24	3	0	0	12
	Total	370	63	1	0	254

Kyle Wood (born 18 June 1989) is an English former rugby league footballer who last played as a hooker for Sheffield Eagles in the RFL Championship.

He has played for Doncaster in 2008 National League Two and the Sheffield Eagles in the Championship. Wood then played for the Huddersfield Giants in the Super League, spending time on loan from Huddersfield at the Batley Bulldogs and Sheffield in the Championship, and the Castleford Tigers in the Super League. He moved to the Wakefield Trinity Wildcats in the top flight, before returning to the Giants in the Super League. Earlier in his career he played as a scrum-half.

== Background ==
Wood was born in Castleford, West Yorkshire, England.

== Career ==
While with the Huddersfield Giants, Kyle was on a dual-contract with the Batley Bulldogs.

=== Halifax Panthers ===
On 9 November 2021, it was reported that he had signed for Halifax in the RFL Championship
