= Josh Griffin =

English professional rugby league & union footballer

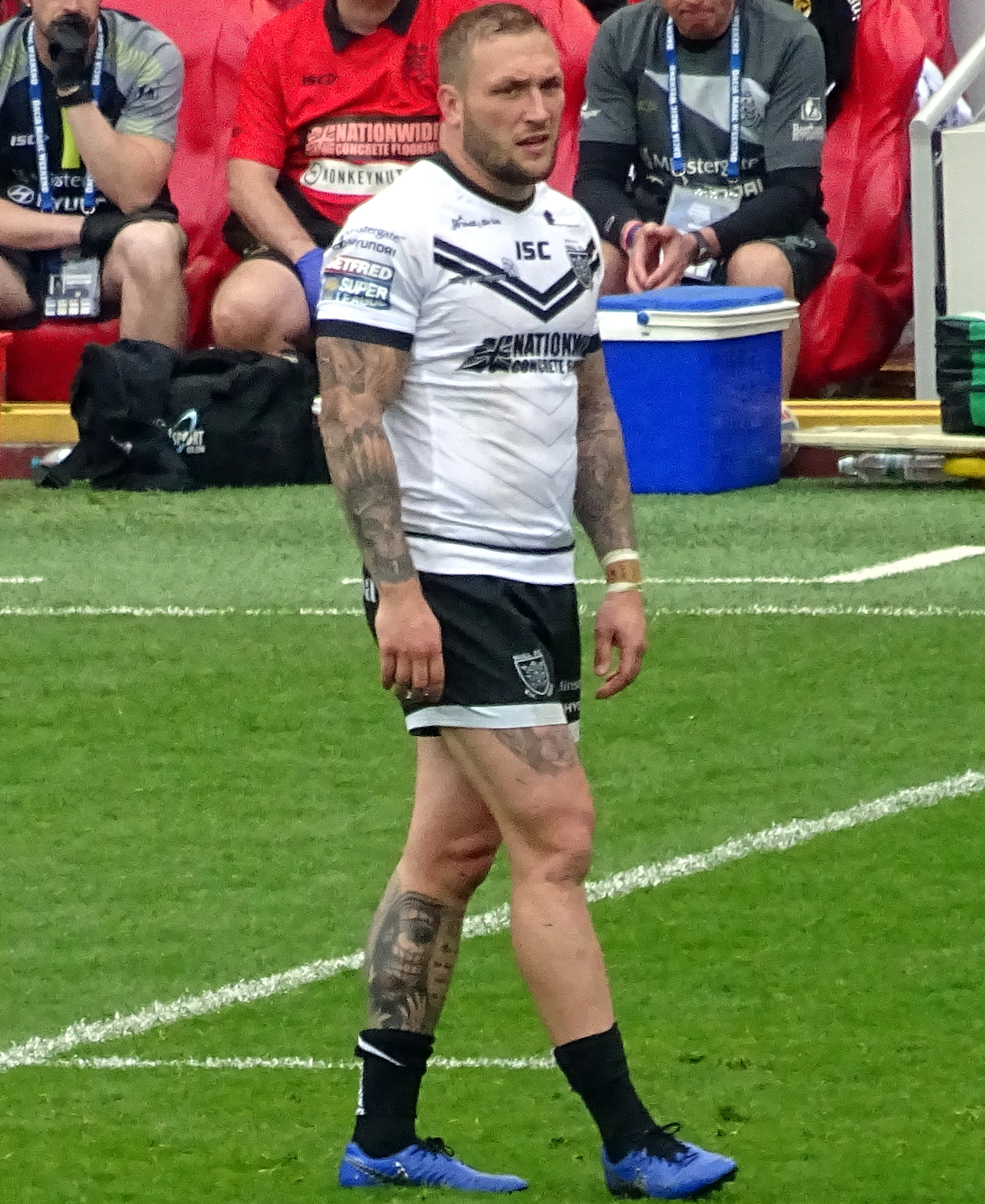

Personal information
- Full name: Joshua Martin Joseph Griffin
- Born: 9 May 1990 (age 36) Oxford, Oxfordshire, England
- Height: 6 ft 0 in (1.83 m)
- Weight: 16 st 12 lb (107 kg)

Playing information

Rugby league
- Position: Centre, Wing, Second-row
Club
Years	Team	Pld	T	G	FG	P
2008	Wakefield Trinity Wildcats	1	0	0	0	0
2009–10	Huddersfield Giants	2	0	0	0	0
2010(loan)	→ Batley Bulldogs	14	5	0	0	20
2011	Wakefield Trinity Wildcats	20	6	20	0	64
2012	Castleford Tigers	21	14	1	0	58
2014	Batley Bulldogs	10	6	0	0	24
2014–16	Salford Red Devils	43	30	86	0	292
2017–23	Hull F.C.	143	45	0	0	136
2023–25	Wakefield Trinity	48	26	0	0	104
2026	York Knights	11	1	0	0	4
	Total	313	133	107	0	702

Rugby union
- Position: Wing
Club
Years	Team	Pld	T	G	FG	P
2012–14	Leeds Carnegie	39	12	0	0	60
2026–	York RUFC	0	0	0	0	0
	Total	39	12	0	0	60
- Source: As of 11 October 2026
- Relatives: George Griffin (brother); Darrell Griffin (brother)

Josh Griffin (born 9 May 1990) is an English former rugby league footballer who plays rugby union for York RUFC in the Regional 1 North East competition.

He has previously played for Hull FC, Huddersfield Giants, Castleford Tigers, Wakefield Trinity and the Salford Red Devils in the Super League. He spent time at the Batley Bulldogs, on loan from Huddersfield and also on permanent deal at Batley in the Championship. Earlier in his career he played as a centre and winger.

Between 2012 and 2014 he played professional rugby union as a winger for Leeds Carnegie in the RFU Championship.

== Background ==
Griffin was born in Oxford, England. He then moved up to Wakefield with his family, and played his amateur rugby league for Stanley Rangers

== Club career ==
=== Wakefield Trinity Wildcats ===
Having joined the club as a junior, Griffin made his professional début for Wakefield Trinity Wildcats in a Challenge Cup victory against Salford on 20 April 2008.

=== Huddersfield Giants ===
He joined Huddersfield Giants at the end of the 2008 season.

He made his début for Huddersfield in the Challenge Cup victory over Rochdale Hornets on 11 May 2009, and made his Super League début later that year.

Griffin spent most of 2010 on loan at Batley, and rejoined Wakefield Trinity Wildcats in 2011.

=== Castleford Tigers ===
He signed for Castleford Tigers in September 2011, and played for them in 2012 before leaving the club to join rugby union club; Leeds Carnegie with immediate effect at the end of the season.

=== Batley Bulldogs ===
He returned to rugby league in 2014 with Batley.

=== Salford Red Devils ===
In 2014, Griffin initially joined Salford Red Devils on a trial for the end of the 2014 season before securing himself a permanent two-year deal.

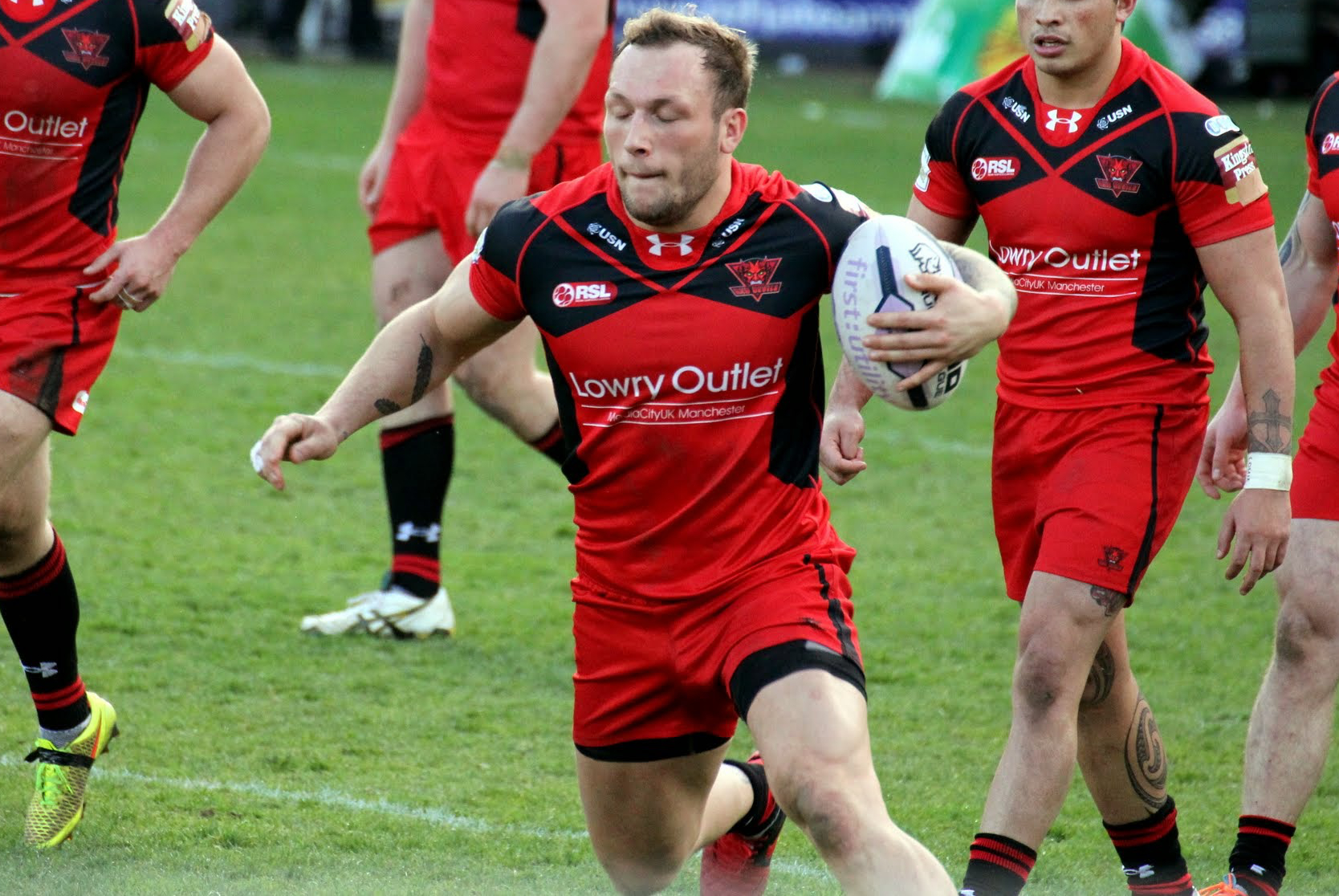
Griffin playing for the Salford Red Devils in 2015

=== Hull F.C. ===
In 2017, Griffin joined Hull F.C., and played in Hull's 18–14 Challenge Cup final win over the Wigan Warriors at Wembley Stadium.

In the 2020 Super League season, he made a total of 16 appearances. He played in Hull's 29–2 semi-final defeat against Wigan. In the first half, Griffin gave away a crucial penalty after Wigan had lost possession of the ball. Griffin raced over to Wigan player Oliver Partington and patted him on the head which sparked an all-in brawl. Wigan would then score two tries in quick succession from the resulting penalty.

In May 2021, Griffin scored his 100th career try in a match against the Leeds Rhinos. The match was Leeds' first home fixture in front of a home crowd for over 400 days as national restrictions were eased during the COVID-19 pandemic.

In the 2021 Challenge Cup semi-final, Griffin ruptured his achilles during Hull FC's 33–18 loss against St Helens RLFC. In round 14 of the 2023 Super League season, Griffin scored a hat-trick in Hull FC's upset victory over Warrington. In the 2023 Challenge Cup quarter-final, Griffin was sent off for dissent just after half-time whistle in Hull FC's match against St Helens. St Helens would go on to win the match 32–18. On 20 June 2023, Griffin was handed a seven-game ban by the RFL and fined £1000 over the incident.

=== Wakefield Trinity ===
In July 2023, Griffin signed a contract to join Wakefield Trinity which would last until the end of 2024. Griffin played 20 games for Wakefield Trinity in the 2025 Super League season including their elimination play off loss against Leigh.

=== York RLFC ===
In August 2025, Griffin signed a contract to join York RLFC ahead of the 2026 season.

In June 2026, Griffin announced that he had retired from rugby league with immediate effect, after suffering a ruptured pectoral muscle.

=== York RUFC ===
On 24 September 2026 it was reported that he had joined rugby union Regional 1 North East side York RUFC

== Personal life ==
Griffin is the younger brother of the rugby league player Darrell Griffin, and the older brother of George Griffin. All three brothers played together for Salford in 2015.

== Honours ==
=== Hull FC ===
- Challenge Cup: (1) 2017

=== Wakefield Trinity ===
- RFL 1895 Cup (1): 2024
- RFL Championship Leaders' Shield: 2024
