= Ian Kirke =

English rugby league footballer

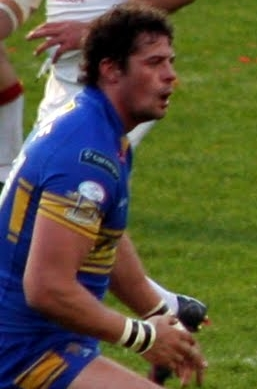

Personal information
- Born: 26 December 1980 (age 45) Hornsea, Humberside, England

Playing information
- Height: 6 ft 5 in (1.96 m)
- Weight: 17 st 7 lb (111 kg)
- Position: Second-row, Prop
Club
Years	Team	Pld	T	G	FG	P
2000	Hull Kingston Rovers	18	1	0	0	4
2002	York Wasps	8	0	0	0	0
2002–04	Dewsbury Rams	45	4	0	0	16
2005	York City Knights	21	4	0	0	16
2005(loan)	→London Broncos	0	0	0	0	0
2006–14	Leeds Rhinos	215	12	0	0	48
2015	Wakefield Trinity Wildcats	5	3	0	0	12
	Total	312	24	0	0	96

Ian Kirke (born 26 December 1981) is an English former professional rugby league footballer who played in the 2000s and 2010s. He played the majority of his career for the Leeds Rhinos in the Super League, for whom he made over 200 appearances and won the Super League Grand Final on five occasions. He also played for the Wakefield Trinity Wildcats in the Super League, and for the York Wasps, Dewsbury Rams and York City Knights.

== Playing career ==
Kirke started his career at Hull Kingston Rovers, making his senior debut in 2000. After spending a year in Hull F.C.'s Alliance side, he joined York Wasps for the 2002 season. In April 2002, he signed for Dewsbury Rams.

Kirke joined York City Knights for the 2005 season. He made 21 appearances and scored five tries for York as they won the National League Two title and, having spent a month on-loan at London Broncos (without making an appearance), was predicted to move to a Super League club the following season.

Kirke joined Leeds Rhinos, having spent the latter part of the 2005 season training full-time with their academy.

He made his Leeds début on Sunday 5 March 2006 when Leeds played Castleford Tigers. During the close season 2006 he had surgery on both his shoulders to fix a long-term injury.

Kirke played in the 2008 Super League Grand Final victory over St Helens.

Kirke played in the 2009 Super League Grand Final victory over St Helens at Old Trafford.

Kirke played in the 2010 Challenge Cup Final defeat by Warrington Wolves at Wembley Stadium.

In July 2011, Kirke was given a new two-year contract at Leeds. Later that year he played from the substitute bench for Leeds in the 2011 Challenge Cup Final defeat by Wigan Warriors at Wembley Stadium. Kirke played in the 2011 Super League Grand Final victory over St Helens at Old Trafford.

Kirke played in the 2012 Challenge Cup Final defeat by Warrington Wolves at Wembley Stadium. Kirke played in the 2012 Super League Grand Final victory over Warrington at Old Trafford.

Kirke played in the 2014 Challenge Cup Final victory over the Castleford Tigers at Wembley Stadium.

In November 2014, Kirke signed a one-year deal to join Wakefield Trinity Wildcats for the 2015 season.
