= Chris Clarkson =

English rugby league footballer

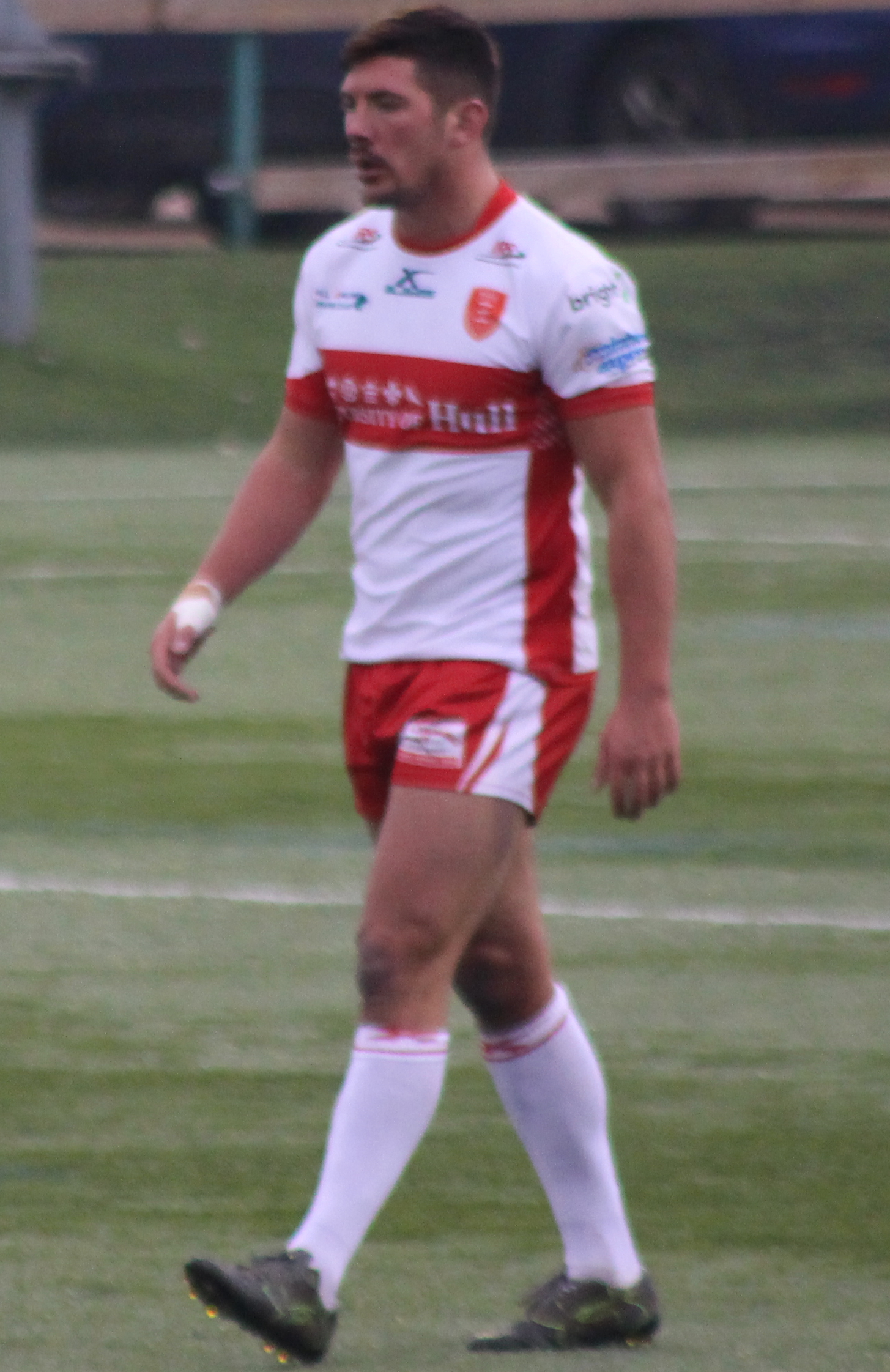

Personal information
- Full name: Christopher Clarkson
- Born: 7 April 1990 (age 36) Leeds, West Yorkshire, England

Playing information
- Height: 6 ft 2 in (1.87 m)
- Weight: 16 st 1 lb (102 kg)
- Position: Second-row, Loose forward, Prop
Club
Years	Team	Pld	T	G	FG	P
2010–15	Leeds Rhinos	118	11	0	0	44
2015(loan)	→ Widnes Vikings	25	4	0	0	16
2016–18	Hull Kingston Rovers	80	11	0	0	44
2019	Castleford Tigers	20	4	0	0	16
2020–23	York Knights	79	14	0	0	56
	Total	322	44	0	0	176
Representative
Years	Team	Pld	T	G	FG	P
2012	England Knights	3	0	0	0	0
- Father: Michael Clarkson

Christopher Clarkson (born 7 April 1990) is an English professional rugby league footballer who last played in the second-row forward for the York Knights in the Championship. He is an England Knights international.

He has previously played for Hull Kingston Rovers and the Leeds Rhinos in the Super League, spending a season on loan from Leeds at the Widnes Vikings in 2015.

== Early life ==
Clarkson was born in Leeds, West Yorkshire, England. Before joining Leeds, Clarkson was a pupil at Temple Moor High School. He played for his local amateur side East Leeds. Clarkson was a new recruit for the Leeds Rhinos Academy in 2006. One year later he became a regular in the Academy side and he helped the Junior Academy side clinch the Championship. For that game he was named in the starting line-up for the victory over St. Helens in the Grand Final. He earned his place in the side after he had registered an impressive nine tries in 21 appearances over the season.

== Club career ==
=== Leeds Rhinos ===
Clarkson made his Super League début for Leeds club on 19 March 2010 in a 10-17 defeat by Hull Kingston Rovers, deputising for Ryan Hall. He showed his versatility by playing on the wing, before following this up at centre in the following game against Wigan.

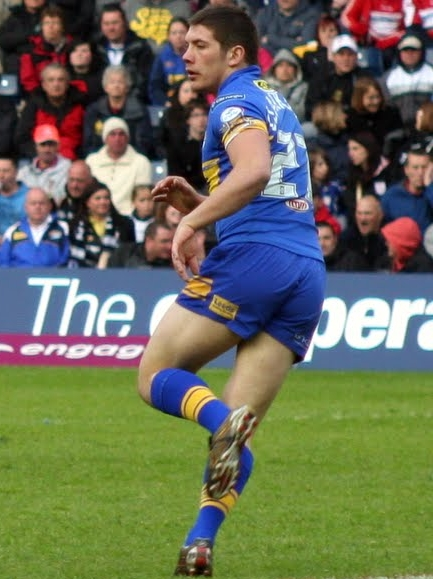
Clarkson playing for the Leeds Rhinos in 2010

He played in the 2010 Challenge Cup Final defeat against Warrington at Wembley Stadium.

Clarkson played from the interchange bench for Leeds in the 2011 Challenge Cup Final defeat against Wigan at Wembley Stadium. He played in the 2011 Super League Grand Final victory over St. Helens at Old Trafford.

Clarkson was part of the successful Leeds team that won the 2012 Super League Grand Final. Clarkson also played a winning role in Leeds 2014 Challenge Cup Final triumph over the Castleford Tigers. Throughout his time with the club, Clarkson made 118 appearances for the Leeds club and registering 11 tries in total.

==== Widnes Vikings (loan) ====
In 2015, Clarkson was sent out on loan to Widnes, where he played 25 games and scored four tries in their Super League and Qualifiers campaign.

=== Hull Kingston Rovers ===
On 2 October 2015, Clarkson signed a three-year deal to play for Hull Kingston Rovers starting in the 2016 season. Clarkson suffered relegation from the Super League with Hull Kingston Rovers in the 2016 season, due to losing the Million Pound Game by Salford. 12-months later however, Clarkson was part of the Hull Kingston Rovers side that won promotion back to the Super League at the first time of asking following relegation the season prior. It was revealed on 10 October 2018 that Clarkson would be departing Hull Kingston Rovers following a restructure of the club's on-field personnel.

=== Castleford Tigers ===
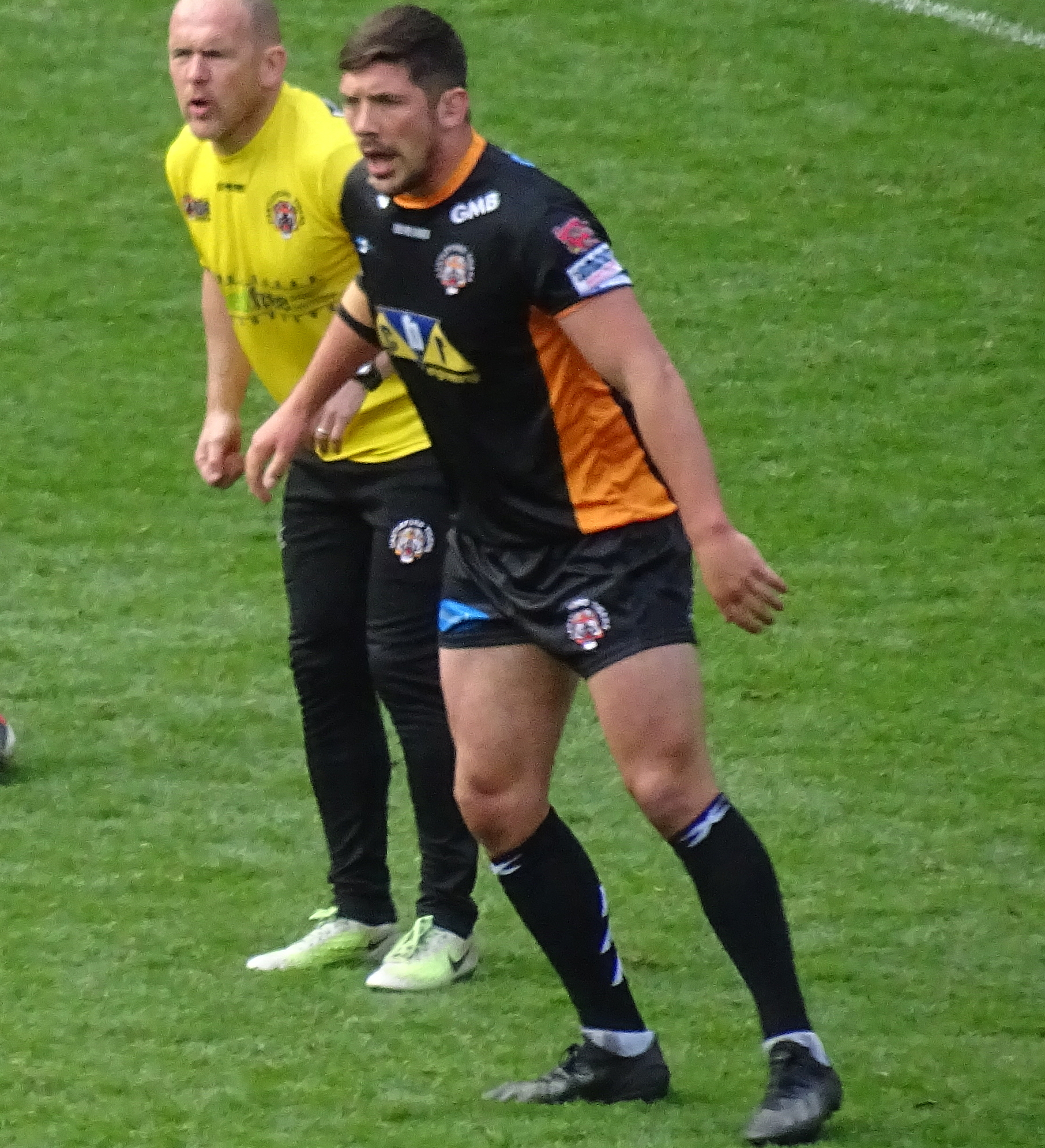
Clarkson warming up for the Castleford Tigers at Anfield in 2019

It was revealed on 7 January 2019, that Clarkson had been offered a trial at Castleford, in hope of earning a permanent deal at the club. It was revealed on 15 February 2019 that, after a successful trial period, Clarkson had signed a one-year contract at Castleford. He was assigned shirt number 33. Clarkson made his Castleford début on 23 February 2019, in a 6-40 victory over the London Broncos. Clarkson scored his first try for the Castleford side on 1 March 2019, in a 32-16 triumph over his former club Hull Kingston Rovers at the Jungle. This was later named Castleford's Try of the Year at the club's end-of-season awards night.

=== York Knights ===
Clarkson joined York Knights ahead of the 2020 season. In October 2023, Clarkson announced his retirement from rugby league at the end of the 2023 season.

== Representative career ==
Clarkson has won representative honours with Yorkshire and England at under-17's level. He has also featured for the England Knights in 2012.

== Honours ==
=== Club ===
==== Leeds Rhinos ====
- Super League (2): 2011, 2012
- Challenge Cup (1): 2014
- World Club Challenge (1): 2012
