= Darrell Griffin =

England international rugby league footballer

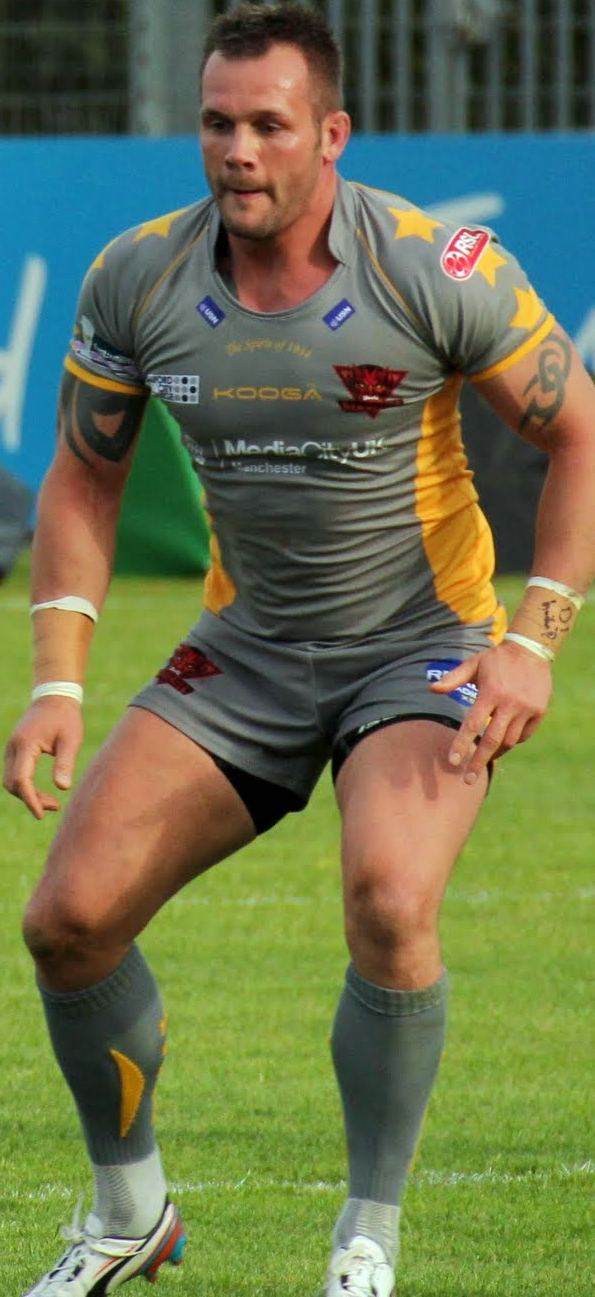

Personal information
- Born: 19 June 1981 (age 44) Witney, Oxfordshire, England

Playing information
- Height: 6 ft 4 in (1.93 m)
- Weight: 18 st 8 lb (118 kg)

Rugby league
- Position: Prop
Club
Years	Team	Pld	T	G	FG	P
2003–06	Wakefield Trinity Wildcats	95	9	3	0	42
2007–11	Huddersfield Giants	140	14	0	0	56
2012	Leeds Rhinos	32	2	0	0	8
2013–15	Salford Red Devils	61	1	2	0	6
2016–18	Featherstone Rovers	62	3	0	0	12
2018	Keighley Cougars	14	2	0	0	8
	Total	404	31	5	0	132
Representative
Years	Team	Pld	T	G	FG	P
2010	England	2	0	0	0	0

Rugby union
Club
Years	Team	Pld	T	G	FG	P
????–03	Harlequin F.C.
2018	Morley RFC	3	0	0	0	0
	Total	3	0	0	0	0
- Relatives: George Griffin (brother); Josh Griffin (brother)

Darrell Griffin (born 19 June 1981) is an English professional rugby league footballer who plays for the Keighley Cougars in League 1. An England international representative prop, his former clubs include the Oxford Cavaliers, the London Broncos (Academy), the Wakefield Trinity Wildcats, the Huddersfield Giants, the Salford Red Devils, the Leeds Rhinos and Featherstone Rovers.

== Background ==
Darrell Griffin was born in Witney, Oxfordshire, England.

== Playing career ==
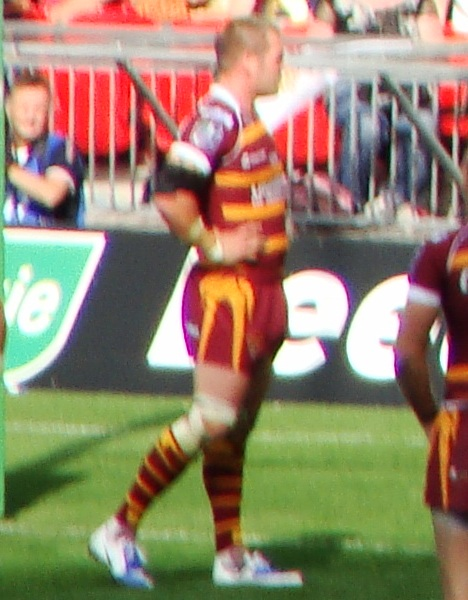
Griffin playing for Huddersfield in the 2009 Challenge Cup Final against the Warrington Wolves.

Griffin came through the youth system at both Oxford and Witney Rugby Club.

He joined Wakefield Trinity Wildcats in June 2003 from rugby union side Harlequins. He made his Super League début in 2003 and played for Wakefield Trinity for three years. He was transferred from Wakefield Trinity Wildcats to the Huddersfield Giants, where he had a successful spell, making over 100 appearances in five years.

He was named in the England training squad for the 2008 Rugby League World Cup.

He was also named in the England team to face Wales at the Keepmoat Stadium, Doncaster prior to England's departure for the 2008 Rugby League World Cup.

Griffin was transferred from Huddersfield to Leeds on a three-year contract in October 2011. He played in the 2012 Challenge Cup Final defeat by Warrington at Wembley Stadium.

Griffin was a member of the Leeds team that won the 2012 Super League Grand Final with victory over Warrington at Old Trafford. He was transferred from Leeds to Salford in 2013 and played for three seasons before leaving at the end of the 2015 season. At the start of the 2016 season Griffin joined Featherstone Rovers, and played for the club until the end of the 2017 season.

=== Featherstone Rovers - RFL Dispute ===
In early January 2018 he was sacked by Featherstone Rovers. Featherstone Rovers cited a breach of contract in that Griffin had played some rugby union games for Morley R.F.C. without the written consent of Featherstone Rovers. Griffin took Featherstone to an RFL tribunal disputing the allegation. In April 2018 the tribunal announced that Griffin was not in breach of his contract and had not committed any gross misconduct. After the tribunal, with compensation from Featherstone still to be settled, Griffin signed a one-year contract with Keighley Cougars.

== Personal life ==
His younger brothers Josh Griffin, and George Griffin are also rugby league players. All three brothers played together for Salford in the 2015 season.
