= 2014 Salford Red Devils season =

- Super League XIX Rank: N/A
- Play-off result: N/A
- Challenge Cup: 5th Round
- 2014 record: Wins: 6; draws: 1; losses: 13
- Points scored: For: 400; against: 548

Team information
- Chairman: Marwan Koukash
- Head Coach: Brian Noble & Iestyn Harris
- Captain: Adrian Morley
- Stadium: AJ Bell Stadium

Top scorers
- Tries: Francis Meli - 14
- Goals: Jake Mullaney - 30
- Points: Jake Mullaney - 68
← 2013	List of seasons	2015 →

This article details the Salford Red Devils rugby league football club's 2014 season. This is the 19th season of the Super League era. This will also be the 1st season that they have played under the Red Devils name.

== Pre season friendlies ==
LEGEND
Win
Draw
Loss

Red Devils score is first.

Date	Competition	Vrs	H/A	Venue	Result	Score	Tries	Goals	Att	Report
24/1/14	Pre Season	Leigh	A	Leigh Sports Village	W	26-16	Johnson, Dixon, Williams, Mullaney, Puletua	Mullaney 3/5	1,887	Report
5/2/14	Pre Season	Warrington	A	Halliwell Jones Stadium	L	8-14	Meli, Johnson	Mullaney 0/2	3,022	Report

=== Player appearances ===
FB=Fullback	C=Centre	W=Winger	SO=Stand Off	SH=Scrum half	P=Prop	H=Hooker	SR=Second Row	LF=Loose forward	B=Bench

No	Player	1	2
1	Jake Mullaney	FB	FB
2	Danny Williams	W	W
3	Martin Gleeson	C	x
4	Junior Sa'u	x	C
5	Francis Meli	C	W
6	Rangi Chase	SO	SO
7	Tim Smith	SH	SH
8	Adrian Morley	P	P
9	Tommy Lee	H	H
10	Lama Tasi	P	P
11	Tony Puletua	L	L
12	Gareth Hock	x	x
13	Harrison Hansen	x	SR
14	Theo Fages	B	B
15	Darrell Griffin	B	B
16	Andrew Dixon	SR	B
17	Shannan McPherson	x	B
18	Steve Rapira	x	x
19	Matty Ashurst	B	SR
20	Adam Walne	B	x
21	Jordan Walne	SR	B
22	Jason Walton	B	C
23	Greg Johnson	W	B
24	Stuart Howarth	B	B
25	Jordan Davies	B	B
26	Niall Evalds	B	B
27	Gareth Owen	B	x
28	Jon Ford	x	x
29	Will Hope	B	x

= Injured

= Suspended

== Super League ==
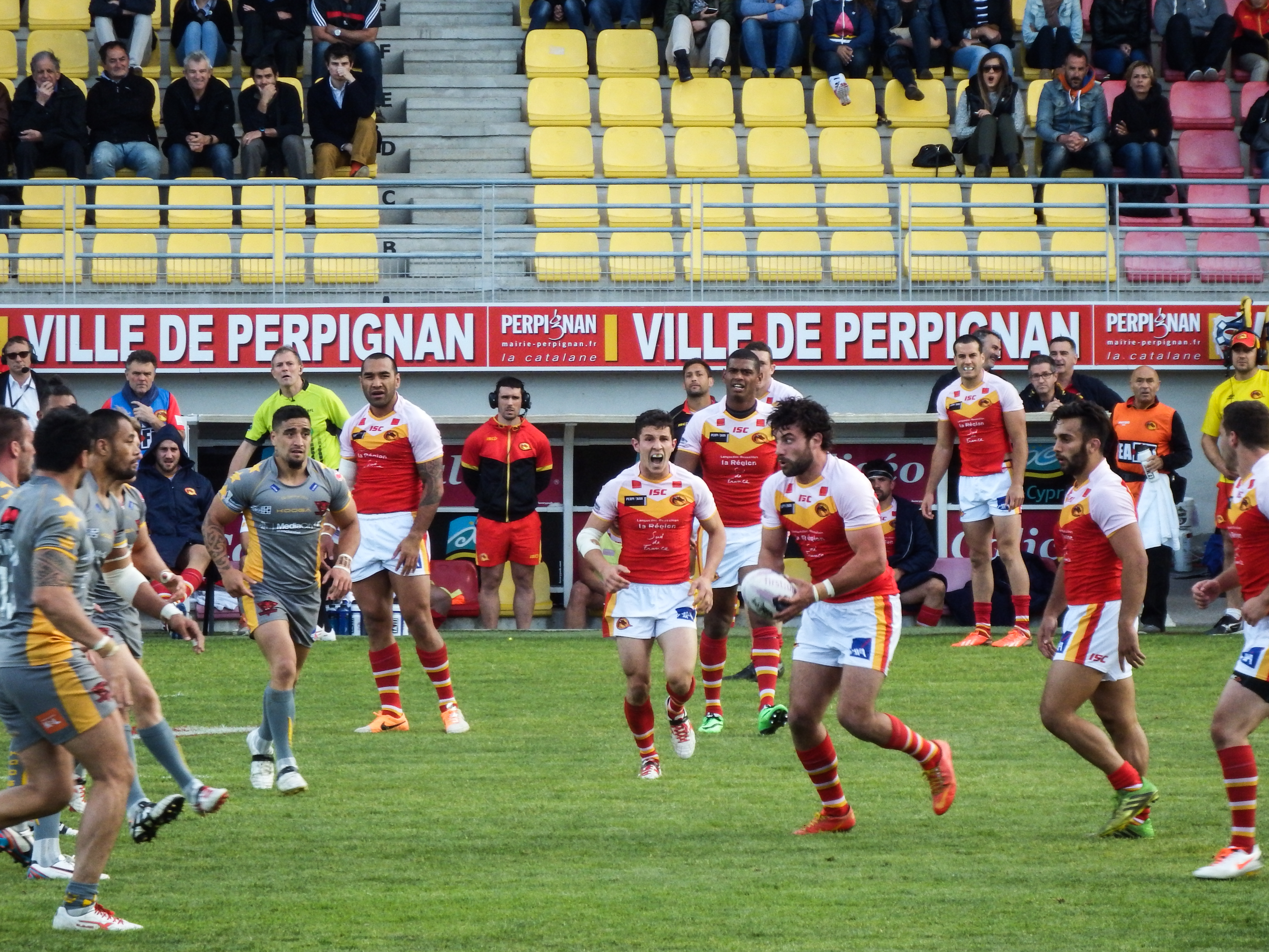
Salford Red Devils (grey) against Catalans Dragons in the Super League XIX

LEGEND
Win
Draw
Loss

=== Matches ===
Date	Competition	Rnd	Vrs	H/A	Venue	Result	Score	Tries	Goals	Att
16/2/14	Super League XIX	1	Wakefield Trinity	H	AJ Bell Stadium	W	18-14	Dixon, Hansen, Hock	Mullaney 3/3	7,102
22/2/14	Super League XIX	2	London	A	The Hive Stadium	W	44-18	Fages (2), Hansen (2), Meli, Mullaney, Smith, Williams	Mullaney 5/7, Smith 1/1	1,246
27/2/14	Super League XIX	3	St. Helens	H	AJ Bell Stadium	L	0-38	-	-	6,353
6/3/14	Super League XIX	4	Widnes	A	Halton Stadium	L	18-32	Fages, Johnson, Lee	Mullaney 3/3	5,291
14/3/14	Super League XIX	5	Warrington	H	AJ Bell Stadium	L	12-28	Manfredi (2), Johnson	Mullaney 0/3	6,260
23/3/14	Super League XIX	6	Castleford	H	AJ Bell Stadium	W	23-16	Dixon (2), Gleeson, Johnson	Mullaney 3/4, Chase 1 DG	5,823
28/3/14	Super League XIX	7	Hull FC	A	KC Stadium	L	8-30	Johnson, Sa'u	Mullaney 0/2	9,821
11/4/14	Super League XIX	8	Bradford	A	Odsal Stadium	W	38-24	Ashurst, Chase, Meli, Mullaney, Puletua, Sa'u, Smith	Mullaney 5/7	6,144
18/4/14	Super League XIX	9	Huddersfield	H	AJ Bell Stadium	L	22-42	Meli (3), Ashurst, Morley	Mullaney 1/5	5,068
21/4/14	Super League XIX	10	Leeds	A	Headingley Stadium	L	4-32	Tomkins	Mullaney 0/1	14,013
3/5/14	Super League XIX	11	Catalans Dragons	A	Stade Gilbert Brutus	L	24-37	Eden, Hock, Meli, Williams	Smith 4/4	7,862
10/5/14	Super League XIX	12	Hull Kingston Rovers	H	AJ Bell Stadium	D	16-16	Meli (2), Gleeson	Mullaney 2/3	2,903
17/5/14	Magic Weekend	13	Widnes	N	Etihad Stadium	L	24-30	Ashurst, Chase, Meli, Sa'u, Williams	Mullaney 2/5	36,339
22/5/14	Super League XIX	14	Wigan	H	AJ Bell Stadium	L	4-25	Meli	Smith 0/1	3,706
30/5/14	Super League XIX	15	St. Helens	A	Langtree Park	L	12-32	Evalds, Hock	Smith 2/2	11,000
15/6/14	Super League XIX	16	Bradford	H	AJ Bell Stadium	W	46-18	Chase (2), Sa'u (2), Dixon, Evalds, Meli, Tomkins	Chase 7/8	3,407
22/6/14	Super League XIX	17	Warrington	A	Halliwell Jones Stadium	L	20-36	Evalds (2), Morley, Sa'u	Chase 2/4	10,120
28/6/14	Super League XIX	18	Castleford	A	The Jungle	L	10-14	Hock, Sa'u	Chase 1/2	5,937
5/7/14	Super League XIX	19	Huddersfield	A	John Smiths Stadium	W	10-36	Chase, Caton-Brown, Ashurst, Locke, Fages, Johnson	Locke 6/6	5,681
10 February 2009	Super League XIX	20	Team	H/A	Stadium	W/D/L	Score	Tries	Goals	Attendance
10 February 2009	Super League XIX	21	Team	H/A	Stadium	W/D/L	Score	Tries	Goals	Attendance
10 February 2009	Super League XIX	22	Team	H/A	Stadium	W/D/L	Score	Tries	Goals	Attendance
10 February 2009	Super League XIX	23	Team	H/A	Stadium	W/D/L	Score	Tries	Goals	Attendance
10 February 2009	Super League XIX	24	Team	H/A	Stadium	W/D/L	Score	Tries	Goals	Attendance
10 February 2009	Super League XIX	25	Team	H/A	Stadium	W/D/L	Score	Tries	Goals	Attendance
10 February 2009	Super League XIX	26	Team	H/A	Stadium	W/D/L	Score	Tries	Goals	Attendance
10 February 2009	Super League XIX	27	Team	H/A	Stadium	W/D/L	Score	Tries	Goals	Attendance

=== Table ===
Super League XIX
Pos	Team	Pld	W	D	L	PF	PA	PD	Pts	Qualification
1	St Helens (L, C)	27	19	0	8	796	563	+233	38	Play-offs
2	Wigan Warriors	27	18	1	8	834	429	+405	37	Play-offs
3	Huddersfield Giants	27	17	3	7	785	626	+159	37	Play-offs
4	Castleford Tigers	27	17	2	8	814	583	+231	36	Play-offs
5	Warrington Wolves	27	17	1	9	793	515	+278	35	Play-offs
6	Leeds Rhinos	27	15	2	10	685	421	+264	32	Play-offs
7	Catalans Dragons	27	14	1	12	733	667	+66	29	Play-offs
8	Widnes Vikings	27	13	1	13	611	725	−114	27	Play-offs
9	Hull Kingston Rovers	27	10	3	14	627	665	−38	23	
10	Salford Red Devils	27	11	1	15	608	695	−87	23	
11	Hull F.C.	27	10	2	15	653	586	+67	22	
12	Wakefield Trinity Wildcats	27	10	1	16	557	750	−193	21	
13	Bradford Bulls (R)	27	8	0	19	512	984	−472	10 (Note: Bradford Bulls deducted 6 points on 25 February 2014 for entering administration)	Relegation to Championship
14	London Broncos (R)	27	1	0	26	438	1237	−799	2	Relegation to Championship

(C) Champions; (L) League Leaders' Shield Winners; (R) Relegated

=== Player appearances ===
FB=Fullback	C=Centre	W=Winger	SO=Stand-off	SH=Scrum half	PR=Prop	H=Hooker	SR=Second Row	L=Loose forward	B=Bench

No	Player	1	2	3	4	5	6	7	8	9	10	11	12	13	14	15	16	17	18	19	20	21	22	23	24	25	26	27
1	Jake Mullaney	FB	FB	FB	FB	FB	FB	FB	FB	FB	FB		FB	SH						x	x	x	x	x	x	x	x	x
2	Danny Williams		W	W	W					x	W	W	W	W	W	W				x	x	x	x	x	x	x	x	x
3	Martin Gleeson		C	C	C	B	C	C	C	C		C	C	C	C					x	x	x	x	x	x	x	x	x
4	Junior Sa'u	C			C	C	C	C	C	C	C	C	C	C	C	C	C	C	C	x	x	x	x	x	x	x	x	x
5	Francis Meli	W	C	C			W	W	W	W	W	W	W	W	W	C	W	W	C	x	x	x	x	x	x	x	x	x
6	Rangi Chase	SO					SO	SO	SO	SO	SO	SO	SO	SO	SO	SO	SO	SO	SO	x	x	x	x	x	x	x	x	x
7	Tim Smith	SH	SH	SH	SH	SH	SH	SH	SH	SH		SH			SH	SH				x	x	x	x	x	x	x	x	x
8	Adrian Morley	P		B	P	P	P	P	P	P		P	B	B	B	B	B	P	P	x	x	x	x	x	x	x	x	x
9	Tommy Lee	H	H	H	B	H	H	H	H	H	L	H			B	B	B	SH	H	x	x	x	x	x	x	x	x	x
10	Lama Tasi	P	P	P	P	P	P	P	P	P	P	P	P	P	P	P	P	P	P	x	x	x	x	x	x	x	x	x
11	Tony Puletua	L		P	B	B	L	L	L	L		B	L	L	P	P	B	B	L	x	x	x	x	x	x	x	x	x
12	Gareth Hock	SR	SR	SR					SR	SR	SR	SR	SR	SR	SR	SR	SR		SR	x	x	x	x	x	x	x	x	x
13	Harrison Hansen	SR	SR	SR	SR	L	SR	SR	SR	SR		SR	SR	SR	SR					x	x	x	x	x	x	x	x	x
14	Theo Fages	x	SO	SO	SO	SO	B	B		x	SH	x	SH			x	SH		SH	x	x	x	x	x	x	x	x	x
15	Darrell Griffin	B	P							B	P	B	P	P	B	B	P	B		x	x	x	x	x	x	x	x	x
16	Andrew Dixon	B		L		SR	SR	SR	x	x	x	x	x	x	x	SR	SR	SR	x	x	x	x	x	x	x	x	x	x
17	Shannan McPherson	B	B	B	B	B	B	B	B	B					x	x	x	x	x	x	x	x	x	x	x	x	x	x
18	Steve Rapira		L		L		x	B	x	x	B	L	B	B	L	L	B	B	B	x	x	x	x	x	x	x	x	x
19	Matty Ashurst		B	B	SR	SR	x	x	B	B	SR	x	B	B	B	SR	x	x	x	x	x	x	x	x	x	x	x	x
20	Adam Walne	x	x	x	x	x	B	x	x	x	B	B	x	x	x	x	x	x	x	x	x	x	x	x	x	x	x	x
21	Jordan Walne	x	B	x	x	B	B	B	B	x	B	x	x	x	x	B	L	B	B	x	x	x	x	x	x	x	x	x
22	Jason Walton	C	B		B	C	x	x	x	x	x	x	x	x	x	x	C	C	B	x	x	x	x	x	x	x	x	x
23	Greg Johnson	W	W	W	W	W	W	W	W	W		x	x	x	x	x	W	W	W	x	x	x	x	x	x	x	x	x
24	Stuart Howarth	B	x	B	H	x	x	x	x	x	B	x	B	B	x	x	x	x	x	x	x	x	x	x	x	x	x	x
25	Jordan Davies	x	x	x	x	x	x	x	x	x	x	x	x	x	x	x	x	x	x	x	x	x	x	x	x	x	x	x
26	Niall Evalds	x	x	x	x	x	x	x	x	x	x	x	x	x	x	W	FB	FB	FB	x	x	x	x	x	x	x	x	x
27	Gareth Owen	x	x	x	x	x	x	x	x	x	x	x	x	x	x	x	x	x	x	x	x	x	x	x	x	x	x	x
28	Jon Ford	x	x	x	x	x	x	x	x	x	x	x	x	x	x	x	x	x	x	x	x	x	x	x	x	x	x	x
29	Will Hope	x	x	x	x	x	x	x	x	x	x	x	x	x	x	x	x	x	x	x	x	x	x	x	x	x	x	x
34	Dominic Manfredi	x	x	x	x	W	x	x	x	x	x	x	x	x	x	x	x	x	x	x	x	x	x	x	x	x	x	x
35	Logan Tomkins	x	x	x	x	x	x	x	B	B	H	B	H	H	H	H	H	H	B	x	x	x	x	x	x	x	x	x
36	Michael Platt	x	x	x	x	x	x	x	x	x	C	x	x	x	x	x	x	B	x	x	x	x	x	x	x	x	x	x
37	Greg Eden	x	x	x	x	x	x	x	x	x	x	FB	x	FB	FB	FB	FB	x	x	x	x	x	x	x	x	x	x	x
38	Kevin Locke	x	x	x	x	x	x	x	x	x	x	x	x	x	x	x	x	x	x	x	x	x	x	x	x	x	x	x
39	Josh Griffin	x	x	x	x	x	x	x	x	x	x	x	x	x	x	x	x	x	W	x	x	x	x	x	x	x	x	x
40	Mason Caton-Brown	x	x	x	x	x	x	x	x	x	x	x	x	x	x	x	x	x	x	x	x	x	x	x	x	x	x	x

= Injured

= Suspended

== Challenge Cup ==
LEGEND
Win
Draw
Loss

Date	Competition	Rnd	Vrs	H/A	Venue	Result	Score	Tries	Goals	Att
3/4/14	Cup	4th	Hull F.C.	A	KC Stadium	W	37-36	Meli (3), Chase, Fages, Sa'u	Mullaney 6/6, Chase 1 DG	5,963
27/4/14	Cup	5th	Vikings	H	AJ Bell Stadium	L	20-30	Hock (2), Sa'u, Tasi	Lee 2/4	2,630

=== Player appearances ===
FB=Fullback	C=Centre	W=Winger	SO=Stand Off	SH=Scrum half	P=Prop	H=Hooker	SR=Second Row	L=Loose forward	B=Bench

No	Player	4	5
1	Jake Mullaney	FB	x
2	Danny Williams	x	x
3	Martin Gleeson	C	C
4	Junior Sa'u	C	C
5	Francis Meli	W	W
6	Rangi Chase	SO	SO
7	Tim Smith	SH	B
8	Adrian Morley	P	P
9	Tommy Lee	H	L
10	Lama Tasi	P	P
11	Tommy Puletua	B	B
12	Gareth Hock	SR	SR
13	Harrison Hansen	SR	SR
14	Theo Fages	B	SH
15	Darrell Griffin	x	B
16	Andrew Dixon	x	x
17	Shannan McPherson	B	x
18	Steve Rapira	L	B
19	Matty Ashurst	x	x
20	Adam Walne	x	x
21	Jordan Walne	B	x
22	Jason Walton	x	x
23	Greg Johnson	W	x
24	Stuart Howarth	x	x
25	Jordan Davies	x	x
26	Niall Evalds	x	x
27	Gareth Owen	x	x
28	Jon Ford	x	x
29	Will Hope	x	x
35	Logan Tomkins	x	H
36	Michael Platt	x	W
37	Greg Eden	x	FB

== Squad statistics ==
- Appearances and points include (Super League, Challenge Cup and Play Offs) as of 28 June 2014.

No	Nat	Player	Position	Age	Previous club	Until End Of	Apps	Tries	Goals	DG	Points
1	(Australia)	Jake Mullaney	Fullback	N/A	Parramatta Eels	2015	13	2	30	0	68
2	(England)	Danny Williams	Wing	N/A	Castleford Tigers	2015	9	3	0	0	12
3	(England)	Martin Gleeson	Centre	N/A	Hull F.C.	2015	14	2	0	0	8
4	(New Zealand)	Junior Sa'u	Centre	N/A	Melbourne Storm	2015	18	9	0	0	36
5	(New Zealand)	Francis Meli	Wing	N/A	St. Helens	2015	18	14	0	0	56
6	(England)	Rangi Chase	Stand off	N/A	Castleford Tigers	2015	16	4	10	2	38
7	(Australia)	Tim Smith	Scrum half	N/A	Wakefield Trinity Wildcats	2015	14	2	7	0	22
8	(England)	Adrian Morley (c)	Prop	N/A	Warrington Wolves	2015	18	2	0	0	8
9	(England)	Tommy Lee	Hooker	N/A	London Broncos	2015	18	1	2	0	8
10	(Samoa)	Lama Tasi	Prop	N/A	Brisbane Broncos	2015	20	1	0	0	4
11	(New Zealand)	Tony Puletua	Second row	N/A	St Helens R.F.C.	2015	18	1	0	0	4
12	(England)	Gareth Hock	Second row	N/A	Wigan Warriors	2015	15	6	0	0	24
13	(Samoa)	Harrison Hansen	Second row	N/A	Wigan Warriors	2015	15	3	0	0	12
14	(France)	Theo Fages	Scrum half	N/A	Salford Red Devils	2015	12	4	0	0	16
15	(England)	Darrell Griffin	Prop	N/A	Leeds Rhinos	2015	12	0	0	0	0
16	(England)	Andrew Dixon	Loose forward	N/A	St. Helens	2015	8	4	0	0	16
17	(Australia)	Shannan McPherson	Second row	28	South Sydney	2015	10	0	0	0	0
18	(New Zealand)	Steve Rapira	Second row	25	New Zealand Warriors	2016	14	0	0	0	0
19	(England)	Matty Ashurst	Second row	24	St. Helens	2015	12	3	0	0	12
20	(England)	Adam Walne	Prop	N/A	Salford Red Devils	2015	3	0	0	0	0
21	(England)	Jordon Walne	Prop	N/A	Salford Red Devils	2016	11	0	0	0	0
22	(England)	Jason Walton	Centre	23	Batley Bulldogs	2015	7	0	0	0	0
23	(England)	Greg Johnson	Wing	n/a	Batley Bulldogs	2015	13	4	0	0	16
24	(England)	Stuart Howarth	Hooker	24	St. Helens	2015	6	0	0	0	0
26	(England)	Niall Evalds	Wing	n/a	Salford Red Devils	2015	4	4	0	0	16
27	(England)	Gareth Owen	Hooker	21	Salford Red Devils	2015	0	0	0	0	0
28	(England)	Jon Ford	Wing	n/a	Salford Red Devils	2015	0	0	0	0	0
29	(England)	Will Hope	Second row	n/a	Salford Red Devils	2015	0	0	0	0	0
34	(England)	Dominic Manfredi	Wing	n/a	Wigan Warriors (Loan)	2014	1	2	0	0	8
35	(England)	Logan Tomkins	Hooker	n/a	Wigan Warriors (Loan)	2014	11	2	0	0	8
36	(England)	Michael Platt	Centre	n/a	North Wales Crusaders	2014	3	0	0	0	0
37	(England)	Greg Eden	Fullback	n/a	Hull Kingston Rovers (Loan)	2014	5	1	0	0	4
38	(England)	Josh Griffin	Wing	n/a	Castleford	2014	1	0	0	0	0

= Injured = Suspended

== Transfers ==
Ins

Nat	Name	Signed from	Contract Length	Date
(New Zealand)	Junior Sa'u	Melbourne Storm	2 Years	June 2013
(England)	Adrian Morley	Warrington Wolves	1 Year	July 2013
(New Zealand)	Francis Meli	St. Helens	1 Year	July 2013
(New Zealand)	Steve Rapira	New Zealand Warriors	2 Years	August 2013
(Australia)	Tim Smith	Wakefield Trinity Wildcats	2 Years	September 2013
(England)	Gareth Hock	Widnes Vikings	4 Years	September 2013
(England)	Rangi Chase	Castleford Tigers	4 Years	September 2013
(New Zealand)	Tony Puletua	St. Helens	2 Years	September 2013
(Australia)	Jake Mullaney	Parramatta Eels		September 2013
(England)	Tommy Lee	London Broncos	2 Years	September 2013
(England)	Jason Walton	Batley Bulldogs		September 2013
(England)	Greg Johnson	Batley Bulldogs	2 Years	September 2013
(Samoa)	Lama Tasi	Brisbane Broncos	2 Years	September 2013
(Samoa)	Harrison Hansen	Wigan Warriors	4 Years	December 2013

Outs

Nat	Name	Sold To	Contract Length	Date
(England)	Ryan Boyle	Castleford Tigers	2 ½ Years	June 2013
(New Zealand)	Liam Foran	Parramatta Eels	2 ½ Years	July 2013
(Italy)	Vic Mauro	Australia	TBA	July 2013
(England)	Ashley Gibson	Castleford Tigers	2 Years	August 2013
(England)	Lee Gaskell	Bradford Bulls	2 Years	August 2013
(Republic of Ireland)	Marc Sneyd	Castleford Tigers (loan)	1 Year Loan	September 2013
(England)	Dan Brotherton	Cambridge Rugby Union	2 Years	September 2013
(England)	Wayne Godwin	Dewsbury Rams	1 Year	October 2013
(England)	Jodie Broughton	Huddersfield Giants	4 Years	October 2013
(Wales)	Jordan James	Gloucestershire All Golds / Wigan Development Coach	2/3 Years	October 2013
(England)	Stephen Wild	North Wales Crusaders	1 Year	December 2013
(United States)	Ryan McGoldrick	No Club	TBA	December 2013
(England)	Adam Neal	No Club	TBA	December 2013
(England)	Ben Gledhill	No Club	TBA	December 2013
(England)	Lee Jewitt	No Club	TBA	December 2013
(England)	Chris Nero	No Club	TBA	December 2013
(England)	Jacob Emmitt	Leigh Centurions	1 Year	January 2014
(England)	Jon Ford	Sheffield Eagles	1 Year Loan	February 2014
(England)	Will Hope	Sheffield Eagles	1 Year Loan	February 2014
