= 2020 Salford Red Devils season =

- Super League Rank: 10
- 2020 record: Wins: 2; draws: 0; losses: 5
- Points scored: For: 84; against: 164

Team information
- Chairman: Ian Blease
- Head Coach: Ian Watson
- Captain: Mark Flanagan
- Stadium: AJ Bell Stadium; Barton-upon-Irwell, Greater Manchester
- Avg. attendance: 4,260
- Agg. attendance: 21,297
- High attendance: 4,796
- Low attendance: 3,350

Top scorers
- Tries: Ken Sio (6)
- Goals: Tui Lolohea (9)
- Points: Tui Lolohea (30)
← 2019	List of seasons	2021 →

This article details the Salford Red Devils's rugby league football club's 2020 season.

== Fixtures and results ==
Win Draw Loss

- All fixtures are subject to change

=== Challenge Cup ===
Date and time	Rnd	Versus	H/A	Venue	Result	Score	Tries	Goals	Attendance	TV	Report
CANCELLED	6	St Helens	H	AJ Bell Stadium							

Salford Red Devils's sixth round opener was due to be against the previous season's champions St Helens, to whom they were runners-up in the Grand Final. However, like all Round 6 ties, it was postponed and eventually cancelled due to the COVID-19 pandemic. Salford was one of a number of teams to receive a bye to the quarter-finals.

Round	Opposition	Score
Quarter-final	Catalans Dragons	W 22–18 (Note: After golden point extra time)
Semi-final	Warrington Wolves	W 24–22
Final	Leeds Rhinos	L 16-17 report

=== Regular season ===
- All fixtures are subject to change

Date and time	Rnd	Versus	H/A	Venue	Result	Score	Tries	Goals	Attendance	TV	Report
2 February, 19:45	1	St Helens	A	Totally Wicked Stadium	L	8–48	Sio	Lolohea (2)	12,008	Sky sports	Report
8 February, 14:00	2	Toronto Wolfpack	H	AJ Bell Stadium	W	24–16	Brown, Lolohea, Williams, Sarginson, Evalds	Lolohea (2)	4,593		Report
14 February, 19:45	3	Huddersfield Giants	H	AJ Bell Stadium	L	10–12	Sio, Sarginson	Lolohea	3,350	Sky Sports	Report
22 February, 14:00	4	Leeds Rhinos	H	AJ Bell Stadium	L	8–22	Evalds, Lolohea	—N/a	4,757		Report
7 March, 17:00	5	Catalans Dragons	A	Stade Gilbert Brutus	L	12–30	Evalds, Sio	Lolohea, Sio	7,904		
1 March, 15:00	6	Wakefield Trinity	H	AJ Bell Stadium	L	12–22	Sio (2), Lolohea	—N/a	3,801		
13 March, 19:45	7	Wigan Warriors	H	AJ Bell Stadium	W	18–14	Evalds (2), Brown	Lolohea (3)	4,796	Sky Sports	
TBC (Note: as a result of the COVID-19 outbreak, the RFL announced that all rugby league games would be suspended initially until/at least 4 April.)	8	Castleford Tigers	H	AJ Bell Stadium							
TBC	9	Hull FC	A	KCOM Stadium							
11 April, 15:00	10	Warrington Wolves	A	Halliwell Jones Stadium							
17 April, 19:45	11	Hull Kingston Rovers	A	KCOM Craven Park						Sky Sports	
26 April, 19:45	12	Huddersfield Giants	A	John Smiths Stadium							
1 May, 19:45	13	Leeds Rhinos	A	Headingley Stadium							
17 May, 15:00	14	Catalans Dragons	H	AJ Bell Stadium							
23 May, 17:15	15	(Magic Weekend) St Helens	N	St James' Park					Sky Sports		
31 May, 15:00	16	Toronto Wolfpack	H	AJ Bell Stadium							
12 June, 19:45	17	Hull Kingston Rovers	H	AJ Bell Stadium							
18 June, 19:45	18	Warrington Wolves	H	AJ Bell Stadium							
28 June, 15:00	19	Leeds Rhinos	H	AJ Bell Stadium							
3 July, 18:00	20	Castleford Tigers	A	Mend-A-Hose Jungle							
11 July, 18:30	21	Toronto Wolfpack	A	Lamport Stadium							
24 July, 19:45	22	Wigan Warriors	A	DW Stadium							
2 August, 15:00	23	Hull FC	H	AJ Bell Stadium							
9 August, 15:00	24	St Helens	H	AJ Bell Stadium						Sky Sports	
16 August, 15:00	25	Wakefield Trinity	A	The Mobile Rocket Stadium							
21 August, 19:45	26	Huddersfield Giants	A	John Smiths Stadium							
30 August, 15:00	27	Wigan Warriors	A	DW Stadium							
4 September, 19:45	28	Warrington Wolves	H	AJ Bell Stadium							
11 September, 19:45	29	Hull FC	A	KCOM Stadium							

== League standings ==
Pos	Team	Pld	W	D	L	PF	PA	PP	Pts	PCT	Qualification (Note: Where teams have the same win percentage, position is decided by points scored percentage (points scored divided by points conceded).)
1	Wigan Warriors (L)	17	13	0	4	408	278	146.8	26	76.47	Semi-finals
2	St Helens (C)	17	12	0	5	469	195	240.5	24	70.59	Semi-finals
3	Warrington Wolves (Note: Salford forfeited a game against Warrington. Under RFL operational rules, the game is recorded as a 24–0 victory for Warrington and converse loss for Salford with the points scored/conceded applying to both teams.)	17	12	0	5	365	204	178.9	24	70.59	Elimination semi-finals
4	Catalans Dragons	13	8	0	5	376	259	145.2	16	61.54	Elimination semi-finals
5	Leeds Rhinos	17	10	0	7	369	390	94.6	20	58.82	Elimination semi-finals
6	Hull F.C.	17	9	0	8	405	436	92.9	18	52.94	Elimination semi-finals
7	Huddersfield Giants (Note: Huddersfield were placed on standby to take the place of any of the four teams in the elimination finals should one be unable to fulfil their fixture.)	18	7	0	11	318	367	86.6	14	38.89	
8	Castleford Tigers	16	6	0	10	328	379	86.5	12	37.50	
9	Salford Red Devils	18	8	0	10	354	469	75.5	10 (Note: Salford deducted 3 wins by the Rugby Football League for failing to meet the terms of a financial commitment agreed in 2013.)	27.78	
10	Wakefield Trinity	19	5	0	14	324	503	64.4	10	26.32	
11	Hull Kingston Rovers	17	3	0	14	290	526	55.1	6	17.65	

Source: BBC Sport
Rules for classification: 1) Points; 2) Points difference; 3) Number of points scored;
(C) Champions; (L) League Leaders' Shield Winners

== Player statistics ==
#	Player	Position	Tries	Goals	DG	Points	Red Cards	Yellow Cards
1	Niall Evalds	Fullback	5	0	0	20	0	0
2	Ed Chamberlain	Wing	0	0	0	0	0	0
3	Kris Welham	Centre	0	0	0	0	0	1
4	Dan Sarginson	Centre	2	0	0	8	0	0
5	Krisnan Inu	Wing	0	0	0	0	0	0
6	Tui Lolohea	Stand-off	3	9	0	30	0	0
7	Kevin Brown	Scrum-half	2	0	0	8	0	1
8	Lee Mossop	Prop	0	0	0	0	0	0
9	Joey Lussick	Hooker	0	0	0	0	0	0
10	Gil Dudson	Prop	0	0	0	0	0	0
11	Ryan Lannon	Loose forward	0	0	0	0	0	0
12	Pauli Pauli	Second-row	0	0	0	0	0	0
13	Tyrone McCarthy	Second-row	0	0	0	0	0	0
14	Sebastine Ikahihifo	Prop	0	0	0	0	0	0
15	Adam Walker	Prop	0	0	0	0	0	0
16	Greg Burke	Loose forward	0	0	0	0	0	0
17	Luke Yates	Loose forward	0	0	0	0	0	0
18	Chris Atkin	Hooker	0	0	0	0	0	0
19	Mark Flanagan	Second-row	0	0	0	0	0	0
20	Josh Johnson	Prop	0	0	0	0	0	0
21	James Greenwood	Prop	0	0	0	0	0	0
22	Rhys Williams	Wing	1	0	0	4	0	0
23	Ken Sio	Wing	0	0	0	0	0	0
24	Elliot Kear	Centre	0	0	0	0	0	0
25	Connor Jones	Fullback	0	0	0	0	0	0
26	Jack Ormondroyd	Prop	0	0	0	0	0	0

- As of Round 7 (15 March 2020)

== 2020 squad ==
2020 Salford Red Devils Squad
First team squad			Coaching staff
1 Niall Evalds – FB, WG; 2 Ed Chamberlain – WG; 3 Kris Welham – CE; 4 Dan Sarginson – CE, WG, FB; 5 Krisnan Inu – CE, WG; 6 Tui Lolohea – SO, WG, FB; 7 Kevin Brown – SO, CE, SH, LF; 8 Lee Mossop – PR; 9 Joey Lussick – HK; 10 Gil Dudson – PR; 11 Ryan Lannon – LF, SR; 12 Pauli Pauli – SR, PR; 13 Tyrone McCarthy – SR, LF	14 Sebastine Ikahihifo – PR, SR; 15 Adam Walker – PR; 16 Greg Burke – PR, LF; 17 Luke Yates – LF, PR; 18 Chris Atkin – SH, SO, HK; 19 Mark Flanagan (vc) – LF, SR; 20 Josh Johnson – PR; 21 James Greenwood – PR, SR; 22 Rhys Williams – WG, CE; 23 Ken Sio – WG, FB; 24 Elliot Kear – FB, CE, WG; 25 Connor Jones – FB; 26 Jack Ormondroyd – PR	27; 28	Head coach: Ian Watson; Legend: (c) Captain(s); (vc) Vice-captain(s)

== 2020 transfers ==
Gains

Player	Club	Contract	Date
(Tonga) Tui Lolohea	Leeds Rhinos	2 years	June 2019
(England) Chris Atkin	Hull Kingston Rovers	N/A	September 2019
(England) James Greenwood	Hull Kingston Rovers	1 year	September 2019
(England) Kevin Brown	Warrington Wolves	1 year	September 2019
(Australia) Pauli Pauli	Wakefield Trinity	N/A	September 2019
(Australia) Connor Jones	Featherstone Rovers	N/A	September 2019
(England) Jack Ormondroyd	Featherstone Rovers	N/A	September 2019
(England) Dan Sarginson	Wigan Warriors	N/A	October 2019
(Wales) Rhys Williams	London Broncos	N/A	October 2019
(Wales) Elliot Kear	London Broncos	N/A	October 2019
(Australia) Luke Yates	London Broncos	N/A	October 2019
(England) Ryan Lannon	Hull Kingston Rovers	Swap Deal	October 2019
(New Zealand) Sebastine Ikahihifo	Huddersfield Giants	Season Loan	November 2019

Losses

Player	Club	Contract	Date
(England) Josh Jones	Hull F.C.	2 years	May 2019
(England) Jake Bibby	Wigan Warriors	2 years	June 2019
(United Kingdom) Jackson Hastings	Wigan Warriors	2 years	June 2019
(Australia) Robert Lui	Leeds Rhinos	2 years	June 2019
(England) George Griffin	Castleford Tigers	2 years	July 2019
(England) Derrell Olpherts	Castleford Tigers	3 years	July 2019
(England) Josh Wood	Wakefield Trinity	2 years	October 2019
(England) Daniel Murray	Hull Kingston Rovers	Swap Deal	October 2019
(England) Greg Johnson	Bradford Bulls	1 year	November 2019
(England) Logan Tomkins	Widnes Vikings	2 Years	November 2019
(Scotland) Adam Walker	Released		February 2020
