= Niall Evalds =

England international rugby league footballer (born 1993)

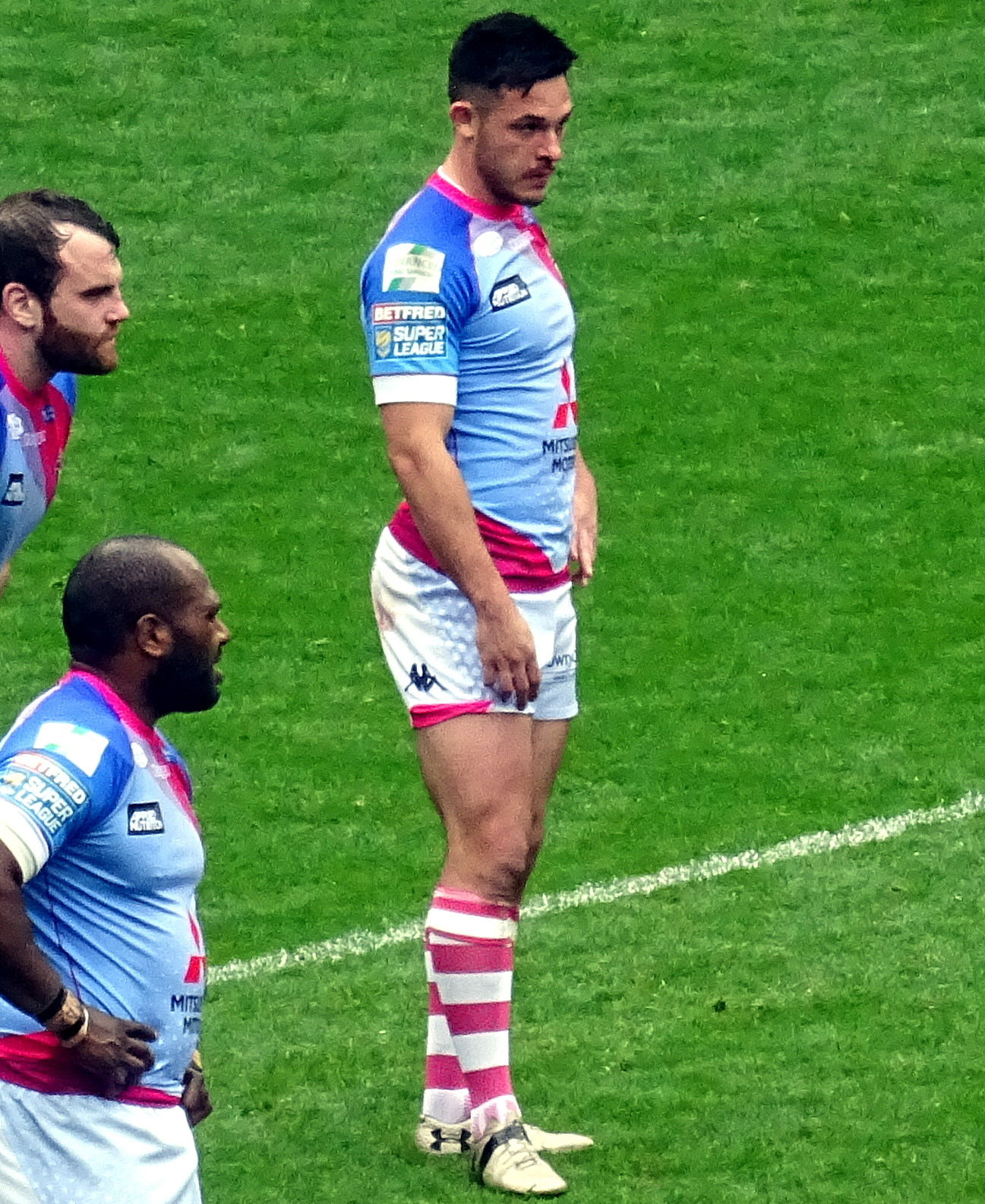

Personal information
- Born: 26 August 1993 (age 33) Halifax, West Yorkshire, England
- Height: 5 ft 11 in (1.80 m)
- Weight: 14 st 2 lb (90 kg)

Playing information
- Position: Fullback, Wing
Club
Years	Team	Pld	T	G	FG	P
2013–20	Salford Red Devils	160	111	0	0	444
2013(loan)	→ Oldham	1	1	0	0	4
2014(loan)	→ Barrow Raiders	5	5	0	0	20
2017(loan)	→ Halifax	2	0	0	0	0
2021–23	Castleford Tigers	37	9	0	0	36
2024–25	Hull Kingston Rovers	32	11	0	0	32
2025 (loan)	→ Huddersfield Giants	2	0	0	0	0
2026–	Huddersfield Giants	0	0	0	0	0
	Total	239	137	0	0	536
Representative
Years	Team	Pld	T	G	FG	P
2018–19	England Knights	2	0	0	0	0
2021	England	1	0	0	0	0
- Source: As of 27 September 2025

Niall Evalds (born 26 August 1993) is an English professional rugby league footballer who plays as a fullback or winger for the Huddersfield Giants in the Super League, and the England Knights and England at international level.

He has previously played for the Salford Red Devils and the Castleford Tigers in the Super League. He has spent time on loan from Salford at Oldham in the Championship 1 and at the Barrow Raiders in the Championship, and on dual registration from Salford at Halifax in the Championship.

Evalds has received one cap for England, and represented the England Knights twice. He holds the Salford club record for most Super League tries. He was awarded the Lance Todd Trophy in the 2021 Challenge Cup final.

== Early life ==
Evalds was born in Halifax, West Yorkshire, England. He is of Latvian descent through his paternal grandfather Jānis ("John"), who settled in Halifax during World War II.

== Career ==
=== Salford Red Devils ===
Evalds made his Super League debut on 9 February 2013 against the Catalans Dragons.

He became Salford Red Devils leading Super League try scorer when he scored his 66th try in the competition against London Broncos in 2019.

He played in the 2019 Super League Grand Final defeat by St. Helens at Old Trafford.

In May 2020, Salford Director Paul King stated that Evalds had rejected the opportunity to extend his contract with the Red Devils into 2021.

On 17 October 2020, he played for Salford in the 2020 Challenge Cup Final which Salford lost 17–16 against the Leeds Rhinos.

=== Castleford Tigers ===
In August 2020, shortly after Super League's resumption following its COVID-19 suspension, it was announced that Evalds had signed a one-year contract with the Castleford Tigers for the 2021 season. He said of the move, "This was an opportunity to take up a new challenge at Cas and have to prove myself all over again." Tigers head coach Daryl Powell described Evalds as "a high-quality player with a real instinct for rugby league".

Evalds made his Castleford debut and scored his first try for the club on 28 March 2021 against the Warrington Wolves. In May 2021, he signed a two-year contract extension with the Tigers, with the option of an additional year. On 17 July 2021, Evalds appeared in his second successive Challenge Cup final as Castleford faced St Helens at Wembley Stadium. He scored a try for Castleford and was voted winner of the Lance Todd Trophy for player of the match, despite the Tigers falling to a 12–26 defeat. He became the fourth Castleford player, and tenth from a losing side, to claim the award. He finished the season having made 20 appearances and scored 7 tries.

Castleford's new head coach for the 2022 season, Lee Radford, was impressed by the ability of Evalds; he said, "I had him amongst the elite fullbacks in the competition, but he has probably surpassed that for me." A hamstring injury limited Evalds' playtime early in the year, and a ruptured bicep suffered in April ruled him out until July. On his second game back, he sustained a shoulder injury in the process of scoring a try against Warrington, which ended his season prematurely.

In March 2023, Evalds suffered another "freak injury" to his other shoulder. He said, "I want to play every game. Before the last year that's what I used to do." He made a try-saving tackle on Joe Burgess on his return against Salford in round 9. In May, he suffered yet another injury – he underwent surgery on a pectoral tear, which brought an end to his season after just 7 appearances. The Tigers later decided against offering a contract extension, with head coach Andy Last explaining, "We're not in a position at this moment to make him an offer because he's not playing. We need to make sure we cut our cloth accordingly and spend our budget." In August 2023, Castleford announced that Evalds would depart the club at the end of the season. He said, "I want to thank everyone at Cas, the fans, staff, and my teammates. They have all supported me through the tough times these last couple of years and I leave with lots of good memories at Cas."

=== Hull Kingston Rovers ===
On 23 August 2023, it was announced that Evalds would join Hull Kingston Rovers on a two-year deal from the 2024 season. Evalds made a try-scoring debut against arch-rivals Hull FC in round 1 of the 2024 Super League season, scoring twice in a 22-0 victory. On 12 October 2024, Evalds played in the 2024 Super League Grand Final loss against Wigan.

=== Huddersfield Giants (loan) ===
On 17 March 2025 it was reported that he had signed for Huddersfield Giants in the Super League on loan for the remainder of the 2025 season, and then becoming a permanent move from 2026. Evalds made his debut at former club Salford Red Devils but only lasted 40 minutes before he was forced off with a metatarsal injury keeping him sidelined for several weeks.

On 12 August 2025 it was confirmed that his loan move will become permanent for the 2026, as he signed a 2-year deal with Huddersfield Giants

== International career ==
In July 2018 he was selected in the England Knights Performance squad. Later that year he was selected for the England Knights on their tour of Papua New Guinea. He played in their 12–16 victory against Papua New Guinea at the Lae Football Stadium in Lae.

In 2019 he was selected for the England Knights in their 38–6 victory against Jamaica at Headingley Rugby Stadium.

Evalds earned his first senior England cap in their 30–10 victory over France at the Stade Gilbert Brutus on 23 October 2021.

== Statistics ==
=== Club career ===
Season	Team	App	T	G	DG	Pts
2013	Salford City Reds	7	4	0	0	16
2013	Oldham R.L.F.C. (loan)	1	1	0	0	4
2014	Salford Red Devils	13	6	0	0	24
2014	Barrow Raiders (loan)	5	5	0	0	20
2015	Salford Red Devils	25	19	0	0	76
2016	Salford Red Devils	21	16	0	0	64
2017	Salford Red Devils	23	16	0	0	64
2017	Halifax RLFC (loan)	2	0	0	0	0
2018	Salford Red Devils	24	13	0	0	52
2019	Salford Red Devils	35	27	0	0	108
2020	Salford Red Devils	12	10	0	0	40
2021	Castleford Tigers	20	7	0	0	28
2022	Castleford Tigers	10	2	0	0	8
2023	Castleford Tigers	7	0	0	0	0
2024	Hull Kingston Rovers	28	10	0	0	40
2025	Hull Kingston Rovers	4	1	0	0	4
2025	Huddersfield Giants (loan)	2	0	0	0	0
2026	Huddersfield Giants					
Totals		239	137	0	0	536

(* denotes season still competing)
