= Théo Fages =

France international rugby league footballer (born 1994)

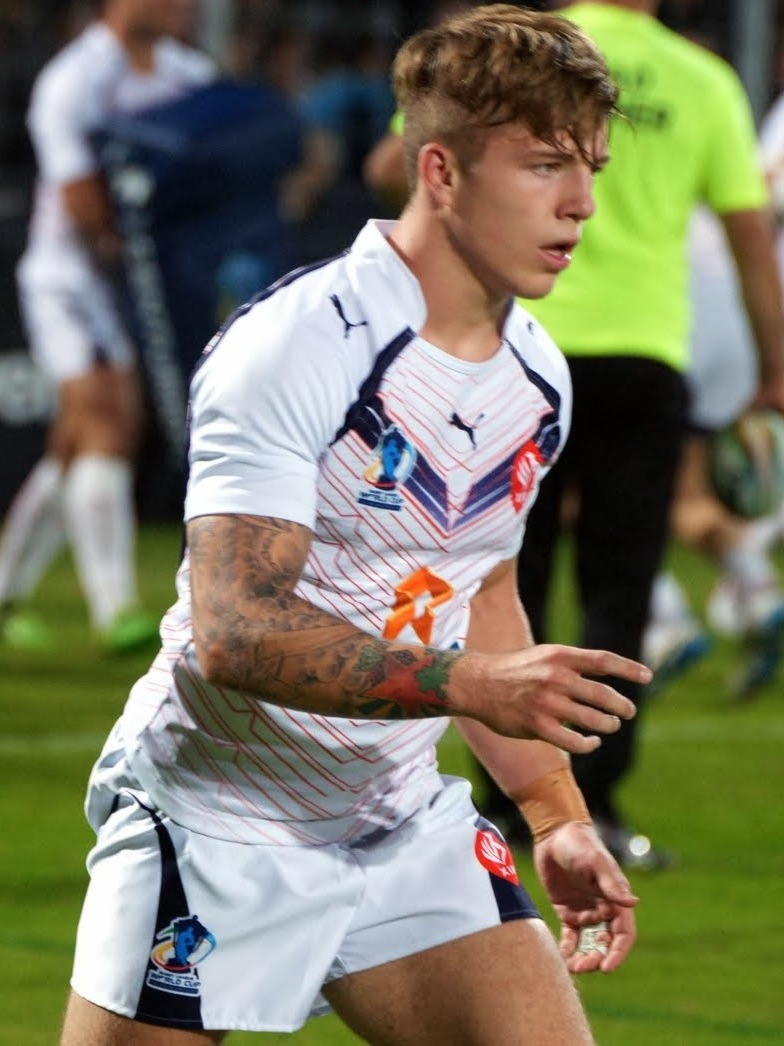

Personal information
- Full name: Théodore Pascal Fages
- Born: 23 August 1994 (age 32) Perpignan, Pyrénées-Orientales, Occitania, France
- Height: 5 ft 6 in (1.68 m)
- Weight: 12 st 4 lb (78 kg)

Playing information
- Position: Scrum-half, Stand-off, Hooker
Club
Years	Team	Pld	T	G	FG	P
2013–15	Salford Red Devils	66	20	4	0	88
2016–21	St Helens	140	39	0	4	160
2022–23	Huddersfield Giants	25	3	0	1	13
2024–25	Catalans Dragons	42	6	0	1	25
2025–	Pia Donkeys	7	7	0	1	33
	Total	280	75	4	7	319
Representative
Years	Team	Pld	T	G	FG	P
2013–	France	20	5	0	0	20
- Source: As of 24 October 2026
- Father: Pascal Fages

Théodore Pascal Fages (born 23 August 1994) is a French professional rugby league footballer who plays as a scrum-half and stand-off for Pia in the Super XIII and France at international level.

He previously played for the Salford Red Devils, St Helens, Huddersfield Giants and Catalans Dragons in the Super League. He played as a hooker earlier in his career.

== Background ==
He is the son of former French international Pascal Fages who appeared for France in the 1995 Rugby League World Cup. Théo replicated his father's achievements in playing for France at a World Cup when he captained his nation at the 2017 Rugby League World Cup.

== Club career ==
=== Salford Red Devils ===
Fages joined Salford as a 16-year-old, progressing through the club's academy system. He made his Super League début for Salford in the first match of the 2013's Super League XVIII in a defeat by Wigan Warriors; the following week he played against Catalans Dragons and was knocked unconscious in the opening minutes of the match by Julian Bousquet, which resulted in a red card for the Catalan player.

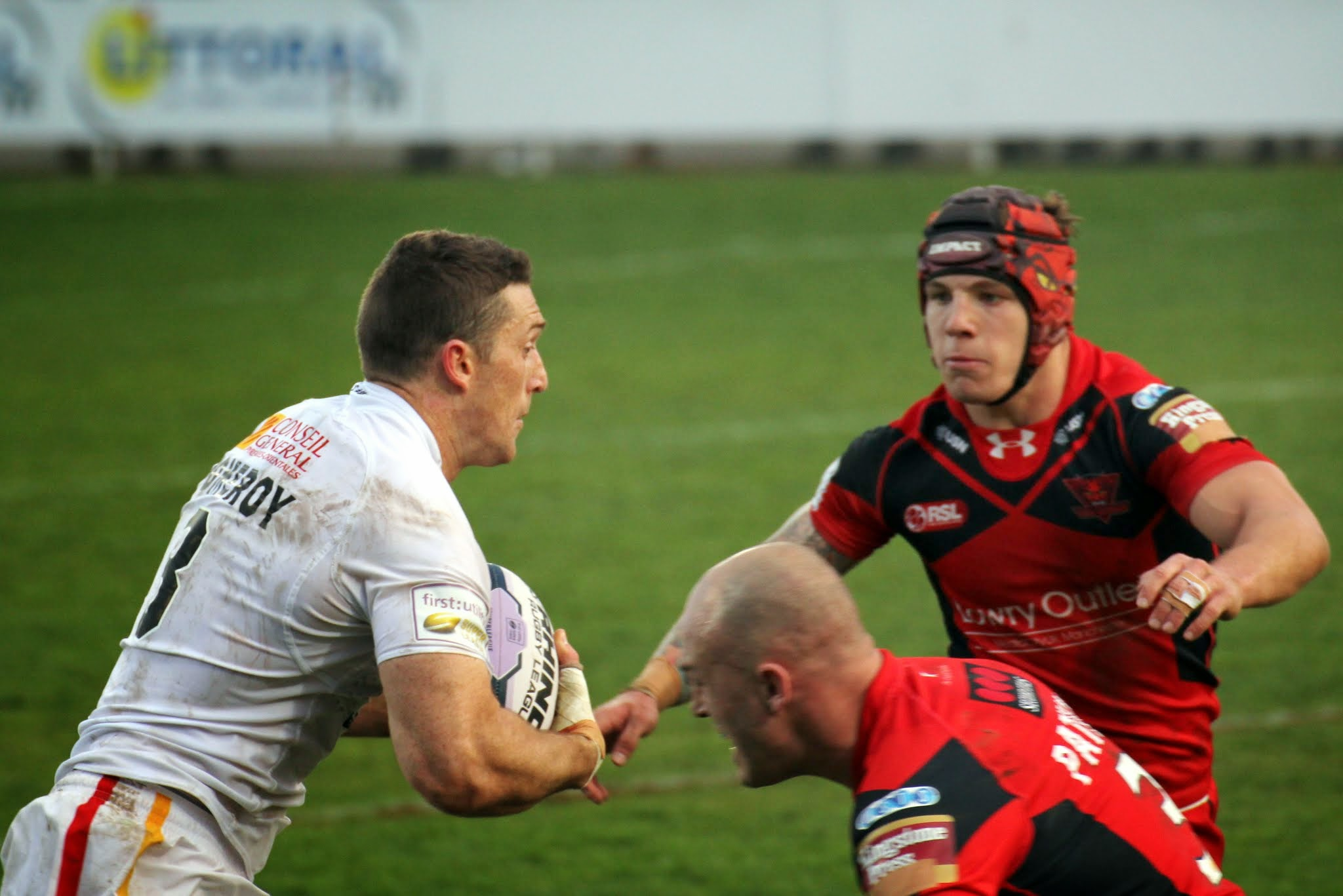
Fages preparing to make a tackle for Salford in 2015

In 2015, Fages submitted a transfer request to leave Salford, with Salford owner Marwan Koukash demanding a world record transfer fee for the player.

=== St Helens ===
On Tuesday 22 September, it was announced that Fages would be released from the Salford club, following receipt of an undisclosed transfer fee. Two days later it was announced that he would join St. Helens from 2016.

On 3 June 2019 Fages signed a contract extension keeping him at St Helens until 2021.

Fages played in the 2019 Challenge Cup Final defeat by the Warrington Wolves at Wembley Stadium.

Fages played in the 2019 Super League Grand Final victory over the Salford Red Devils at Old Trafford.

Fages scored his first drop goal for St Helens in the Golden point win against Hull Kingston Rovers on 11 September 2020.

Fages played in St Helens 8-4 2020 Super League Grand Final victory over Wigan at the Kingston Communications Stadium in Hull.

Fages played for St. Helens in their 2021 Challenge Cup Final victory over Castleford.

=== Huddersfield Giants ===
On the 13 October 2021, it was confirmed that Fages would be joining Huddersfield Giants from 2022.

Fages made his club debut for Huddersfield in round 1 of the 2022 Super League season where they defeated Toulouse Olympique 42-14.

On 11 August 2023, Fages signed a two-year deal to join the Catalans Dragons ahead of the 2024 Super League season.

=== Catalans Dragons ===
Fages made his club debut for Catalans in round 1 of the 2024 Super League season against Warrington. The following week, he scored two tries for Catalans in their 34-0 victory over the newly promoted London Broncos side.

=== Pia XIII ===
In August 2025, it was announced that Fages would be returning to his childhood club, Baroudeurs de Pia XIII, for the 2025/2026 season. Pia play in the French Super XIII competition. On 6 June 2026, Fages scored the golden point drop goal for Pia in their 31–20 win over Carcassonne in the Super XIII grand final.

== International career ==
Fages made his début for France in the victory over Papua New Guinea at the 2013 Rugby League World Cup, and went on to make one further appearance in the tournament.

He played in the 2014 European Cup, scoring his first try for France in a victory over Wales.

He was named captain of the French team prior to the 2015 European Cup. In the tournament he scored against Ireland (1 try).

On 1 October 2026 he was named in the 2026 France World Cup squad
