= Tim Smith (rugby league) =

Australian rugby league footballer

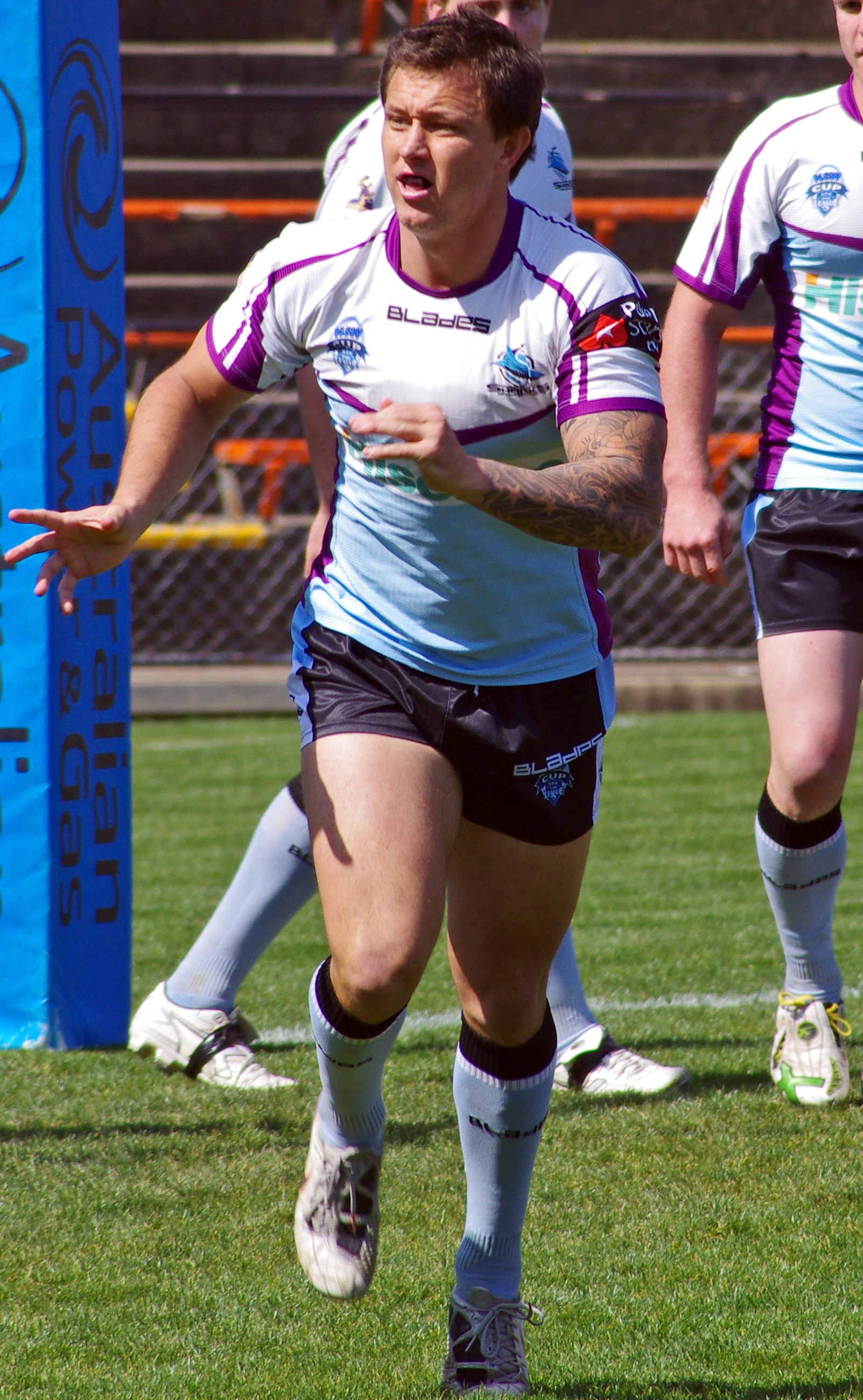

Personal information
- Full name: Timothy Aiden Smith
- Born: 13 January 1985 (age 41) Gold Coast, Queensland, Australia
- Height: 180 cm (5 ft 11 in)
- Weight: 86 kg (13 st 8 lb)

Playing information
- Position: Halfback, Five-eighth
Club
Years	Team	Pld	T	G	FG	P
2005–08	Parramatta Eels	71	11	1	0	46
2008–09	Wigan Warriors	23	2	0	0	8
2010–11	Cronulla Sharks	19	5	4	1	29
2012–14	Wakefield Trinity Wildcats	51	8	0	0	32
2014–15	Salford Red Devils	13	2	7	0	22
2015(loan)	→ Wakefield Trinity Wildcats	30	6	0	0	24
	Total	207	34	12	1	161
- Source: As of 22 September 2023

Timothy Aiden Smith (born 13 January 1985) is an Australian former professional rugby league footballer. He previously played for Super League clubs Wigan Warriors and Wakefield Trinity Wildcats (twice), and Salford Red Devils, and in Australia for the Parramatta Eels and the Cronulla-Sutherland Sharks of the National Rugby League in the NRL. Smith's usual position was in the halves.

== Playing career ==
=== Parramatta Eels ===
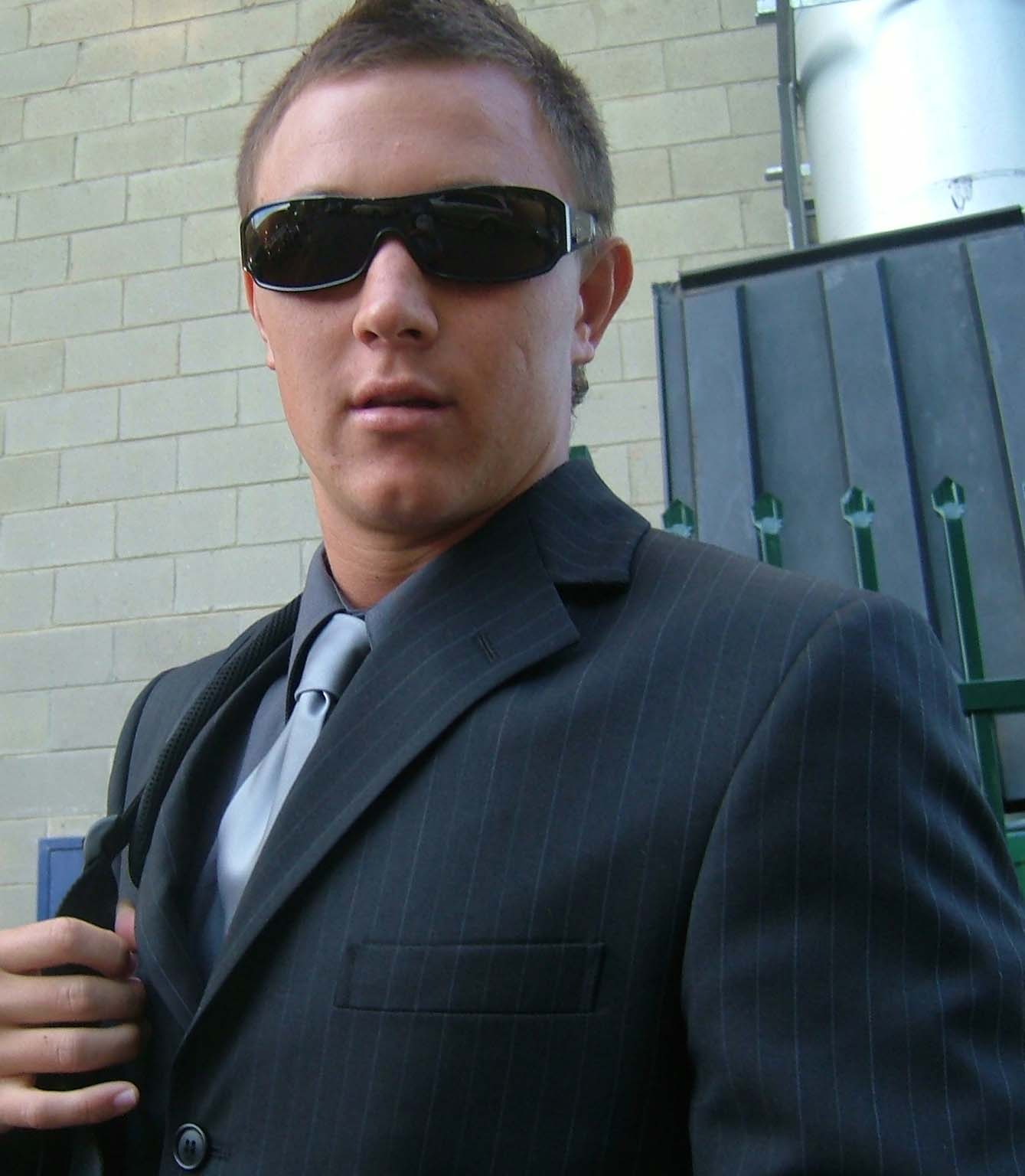
Smith in 2005

Smith started his NRL career with the Parramatta Eels and received much acclaim from Parramatta legend Peter Sterling, who "handed over" the Eels number 7 jersey in an episode of The NRL Footy Show in the middle of 2005. Smith played 26 games in the 2005 NRL season as Parramatta won the Minor Premiership. Along with St. George Illawarra, Parramatta were favorites to win the premiership in 2005 but were defeated 29–0 in the preliminary final by North Queensland at Telstra Stadium in an upset loss.

After leading the competition in try assists he won the rookie of the year award at the 2005 Dally M Awards. With 40 try assists in his début season Smith was named the 2005 Parramatta Eels season's rookie of the year. As of the 2019 NRL season, Smith's 40 try assists is still an NRL record.

In December 2005, Smith was allegedly involved in a street scuffle with a man in the inner-Sydney suburb of the Rocks. He denied any such action and no charges were laid. In 2006, Smith was involved in an altercation with Australian cricketer Michael Clarke after Clarke confronted Smith at the Northies Hotel in Cronulla. It was alleged that Smith was talking to Clarke's ex-girlfriend which led to the altercation.

In the 2007 NRL season, Smith played 27 games for Parramatta as the club made it to the preliminary final but fell short of a grand final appearance losing to Melbourne 26–10. In December 2007, further allegations of public drunken behaviour were made against Smith.

Smith was suspended indefinitely by Parramatta. He remained on contract with the club, and Parramatta stated the most important issue was his health. Smith booked himself into full-time rehabilitation interstate. On 8 January 2008 the Parramatta Club reviewed his behaviour at the rehabilitation clinic and lifted his suspension but he was subject to a number of sanctions which included a fine and charity work.

Early in the 2008 season, after just three games of football, Smith advised his club and teammates that he was suffering from bipolar disorder. He then gave a statement to the media saying he had been given an indefinite leave from football, saying he was having trouble coping with the constant criticism from the media.

Smith returned to his family in the Gold Coast, with the aim to rest and recuperate with the aim of returning to professional rugby league in the future.

=== Wigan Warriors ===
Wigan announced in June 2008 that they had signed Smith for the remainder of the 2008 season and 2009.

Smith linked up with his new teammates in July once his work-permit has been approved, after weeks of visa complications. He played his professional début for the club in a home loss to Huddersfield, although the mental illness that had ended his season for the Parramatta Eels and lack of match fitness did produce some concern about his ability to play rugby league in Europe's top-flight competition, which was reflected in the terms of his contract to Wigan, despite his claims that his bipolar condition was now under control:

We acknowledge some risks – reflected in the contract – in signing Tim after his early-season illness difficulties but Tim now feels ready to re-launch his Rugby League career away from the Sydney media pressure. We believe the supportive and professional environment at the Wigan club is ideal to help him achieve this.

— Ian Lenagan

=== Cronulla-Sutherland Sharks ===
He signed with the Brisbane Broncos for the 2010 NRL season but did not make an appearance, which led to his move to the Sharks. In late 2009, Smith began training with the Brisbane Broncos in a bid to win a return to the NRL through their Queensland Cup feeder side Easts Tigers. Months later, he signed with the Cronulla-Sutherland Sharks. In his first match back in the NRL, he played his former club the Parramatta Eels, and was influential in leading the Sharks to an 11–0 win, scoring a penalty goal and a field goal. However Smith's form subsequently dropped, which resulted in his axing to the NSW Cup.

=== Wakefield Trinity ===
Smith signed with Wakefield Trinity for the 2012 season and made his first public appearance at the Trinity kit launch on 8 December.

=== Salford Red Devils ===
Smith signed with Salford Red Devils towards the end of the 2013 season, with the chairman of his former club releasing a statement confirming that Salford had paid 'a substantial fee' for the half back.

On 10 June, Smith returned to Wakefield on loan until the end of the season. However, on the same day, Salford owner Marwan Koukash had to ditch players to fit Kevin Locke in the team. Locke had a high salary, and Tim and teammate Shannan McPherson had to leave in order for Locke to fit under the Salary Cap and avoid breach.

=== Return to Wakefield Trinity ===
In October 2014, Smith rejoined Wakefield on a one-year deal. On 1 October 2015, Smith was terminated by Wakefield for gross misconduct and for bringing the club into disrepute.

It was alleged at the time that Smith along with teammate Kevin Locke had crashed his car into another vehicle and into the wall of a house. Smith attended Beverley magistrates court and was banned from driving for 28 months and fined £900 after admitting failing to provide a specimen following the car crash in September 2015. Smith was also handed a £600 fine for careless driving.

Wakefield chairman Michael Carter said to the media "A letter was last night sent to Tim Smith and his lawyer saying we were dismissing him for gross misconduct and bringing the club into disrepute. After Smith was terminated by Wakefield, Kevin Locke was also terminated on the same day.

== Post-playing career ==
In November 2018, Smith was announced as assistant coach of the Victoria Thunderbolts. On 19 November 2018, Smith played for Parramatta in the Legends of League tournament held at the Central Coast Stadium in Gosford. Smith became coach of the Quaker Valley rugby team in 2019.
