= 2013 Salford City Reds season =

- Super League XVIII Rank: 14th
- Play-off result: N/A
- Challenge Cup: N/A
- 2013 record: Wins: 0; draws: 0; losses: 0

Team information
- Chairman: Marwan Koukash
- Head Coach: Phil Veivers; Alan Hunte (interim); Brian Noble
- Captain: Martin Gleeson
- Stadium: AJ Bell Stadium
← 2012	List of seasons	2014 →

The Salford City Reds played in Super League XVIII during the 2013 season. This was the 18th season of the Super League era.

Prior to the season the club looked to be folding until Marwan Koukash took it over from John Wilkinson in January 2013.

Reds' first game of the 2013 Super League was a 0-42 home defeat by Wigan Warriors.

== Table ==
Super League XVIII
Pos	Team	Pld	W	D	L	PF	PA	PD	Pts	Qualification
1	Huddersfield Giants (L)	27	21	0	6	851	507	+344	42	Play-offs
2	Warrington Wolves	27	20	1	6	836	461	+375	41	Play-offs
3	Leeds Rhinos	27	18	1	8	712	507	+205	37	Play-offs
4	Wigan Warriors (C)	27	17	1	9	816	460	+356	35	Play-offs
5	St. Helens	27	15	1	11	678	536	+142	31	Play-offs
6	Hull F.C.	27	13	2	12	652	563	+89	28	Play-offs
7	Catalans Dragons	27	13	2	12	619	604	+15	28	Play-offs
8	Hull Kingston Rovers	27	13	0	14	642	760	−118	26	Play-offs
9	Bradford Bulls	27	10	2	15	640	658	−18	22	
10	Widnes Vikings	27	10	2	15	695	841	−146	22	
11	Wakefield Trinity Wildcats	27	10	1	16	660	749	−89	21	
12	Castleford Tigers	27	9	2	16	702	881	−179	20	
13	London Broncos	27	5	2	20	487	946	−459	12	
14	Salford City Reds	27	6	1	20	436	953	−517	11 (Note: Salford deducted 2 points on 14 June 2013 for fielding 14 players during home game against Castleford)	

Source: superleague.co.uk and BBC Sport
Rules for classification: 1st on competition points; 2nd on match points difference. Competition points: for win = 2; for draw = 1; for loss = 0.
(C) Champions; (L) League Leaders' Shield Winners

== 2013 transfers out ==
	Name	Position	Club Signed	Date
(England)	Matty Smith	Scrum Half	Wigan Warriors	August 2012
(Australia)	Luke Patten	Fullback	Retirement	August 2012
(Republic of Ireland)	Sean Gleeson	Centre	Hull Kingston Rovers	August 2012
(New Zealand)	Iafeta Paleaaesina	Prop	Limoux Grizzlies	September 2012
(Australia)	Luke Towers	Prop	Limoux Grizzlies	September 2012
(Australia)	Daniel Holdsworth	Stand Off	Hull FC	September 2012
