= Andrew Dixon (rugby league) =

English rugby league footballer (born 1990)

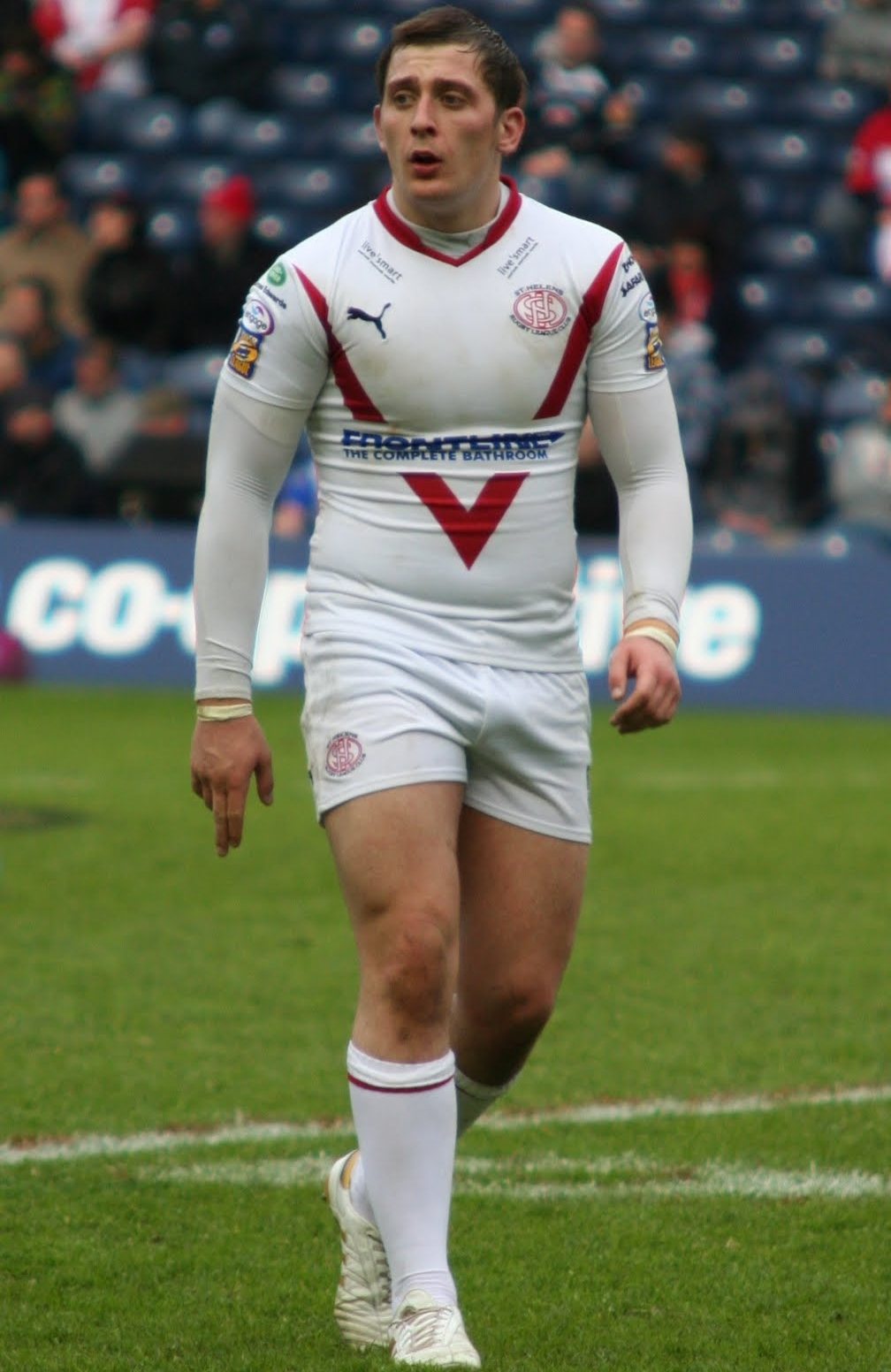

Personal information
- Full name: Andrew James Dixon
- Born: 28 February 1990 (age 36) Manchester, England
- Height: 6 ft 0 in (1.83 m)
- Weight: 15 st 8 lb (99 kg)

Playing information
- Position: Second-row
Club
Years	Team	Pld	T	G	FG	P
2008–12	St Helens	67	13	0	0	52
2013–14	Salford Red Devils	37	8	0	0	32
2014(loan)	→ Barrow Raiders	1	0	0	0	0
2015–16	Leigh Centurions	38	9	0	0	36
2017–20	Toronto Wolfpack	73	28	0	0	112
2021–22	Toulouse Olympique	23	5	0	0	20
2023–	Salford Red Devils	7	0	0	0	0
2023(loan)	→ Widnes Vikings	1	0	0	0	0
	Total	247	63	0	0	252
- Source: As of 25 May 2023

Andrew Dixon (born 28 February 1990) is an English professional rugby league footballer who plays as a second-row forward for the Salford Red Devils in the Super League.

He previously played for St Helens, Salford Red Devils, Toronto Wolfpack and Toulouse Olympique in the Super League, and the Leigh Centurions in the Championship.

== Background ==
Dixon was born in Manchester, England. Dixon attended St Gregory's RC High School in Warrington. Dixon attended Liverpool John Moores University in 2016 gaining a BSc in Sport & Exercises Science and in 2018 a MSc in Strength & Conditioning.

== Club career ==
=== St Helens ===
He signed for St. Helens as a junior from local amateur team Blackbrook Royals at the age of 16.

Dixon was added to St Helens' Super League squad in 2008, but did not feature for the first team that season. He made his Super League début for St Helens in February 2009 at the age of 18 years old, in a narrow defeat by Hull Kingston Rovers. Dixon went on to make 67 appearances for St Helens between 2009 and 2012, scoring a try in the 2010 Super League Grand Final.

He played in the 2011 Super League Grand Final defeat by the Leeds Rhinos at Old Trafford. His final game came in the 2012 semi final play off defeat against Warrington wolves.

=== Salford Red Devils & Leigh Centurions ===
Dixon joined Salford Red Devils for the 2013 Super League season. Shortly after, the club went into administration until it was taken over by Marwan Koukash. He played for the club for two seasons, making a total of 37 appearances, captaining the club for stages and picking up the clubs player of the year during the 2013 season. During the 2014 season he suffered a broken cheekbone and after a change of coach, joined Leigh Centurions in the Championship shortly after the 2014 pre season. While at Leigh, Dixon won the 2015 and 2016 Championship titles, and helped Leigh gain promotion to Super League via the 2016 Super 8s.

=== Toronto Wolfpack ===
In August 2016 it was announced that Dixon would be joining Toronto Wolfpack for their inaugural season in 2017. Dixon enjoyed 4 seasons with the Wolfpack, winning the 2017 Betfred League 1 title and the 2018 and 2019 Championship titles. He played an integral role during the 2019 campaign, playing every single game and helping the Wolfpack achieve promotion into Super League by gaining a 24–6 victory over Featherstone Rovers in the 2019 Million Pound Game. Dixon was part of the squad that took the field for the 2020 season in Super League until their withdrawal. He played in their final game against Huddersfield Giants in the Challenge cup which was their only win of the season, 18 - 0.

=== Toulouse Olympique ===
On 18 December 2020 it was announced that Dixon would join Toulouse for the 2021 season Dixon played 9 of the 14 league games during the 2021 season scoring five times, helping Toulouse get promoted to Super league. Upon promotion to Super League, Dixon appeared 14 times for the French team during the 2022 season.

=== Salford Red Devils (rejoin) ===
On 30 October 2022 it was announced that Dixon would rejoin Salford Red Devils for the 2023 season.
