= Pascal Fages =

Former France international rugby league footballer

Personal information
- Born: France
- Height: 178 cm (5 ft 10 in)

Playing information
- Position: Centre, Stand-off
Club
Years	Team	Pld	T	G	FG	P
1988–95	Pia	50	10	5	1	53
Representative
Years	Team	Pld	T	G	FG	P
1991–95	France	16	2	1	0	10
- Relatives: Théo Fages (son)

Pascal Fages is a French former professional rugby league footballer who represented France at the 1995 World Cup.

== Background ==
Pascal Fages is the father of the rugby league footballer; Théo Fages.
