= Harrison Hansen =

New Zealand & Samoa international rugby league footballer

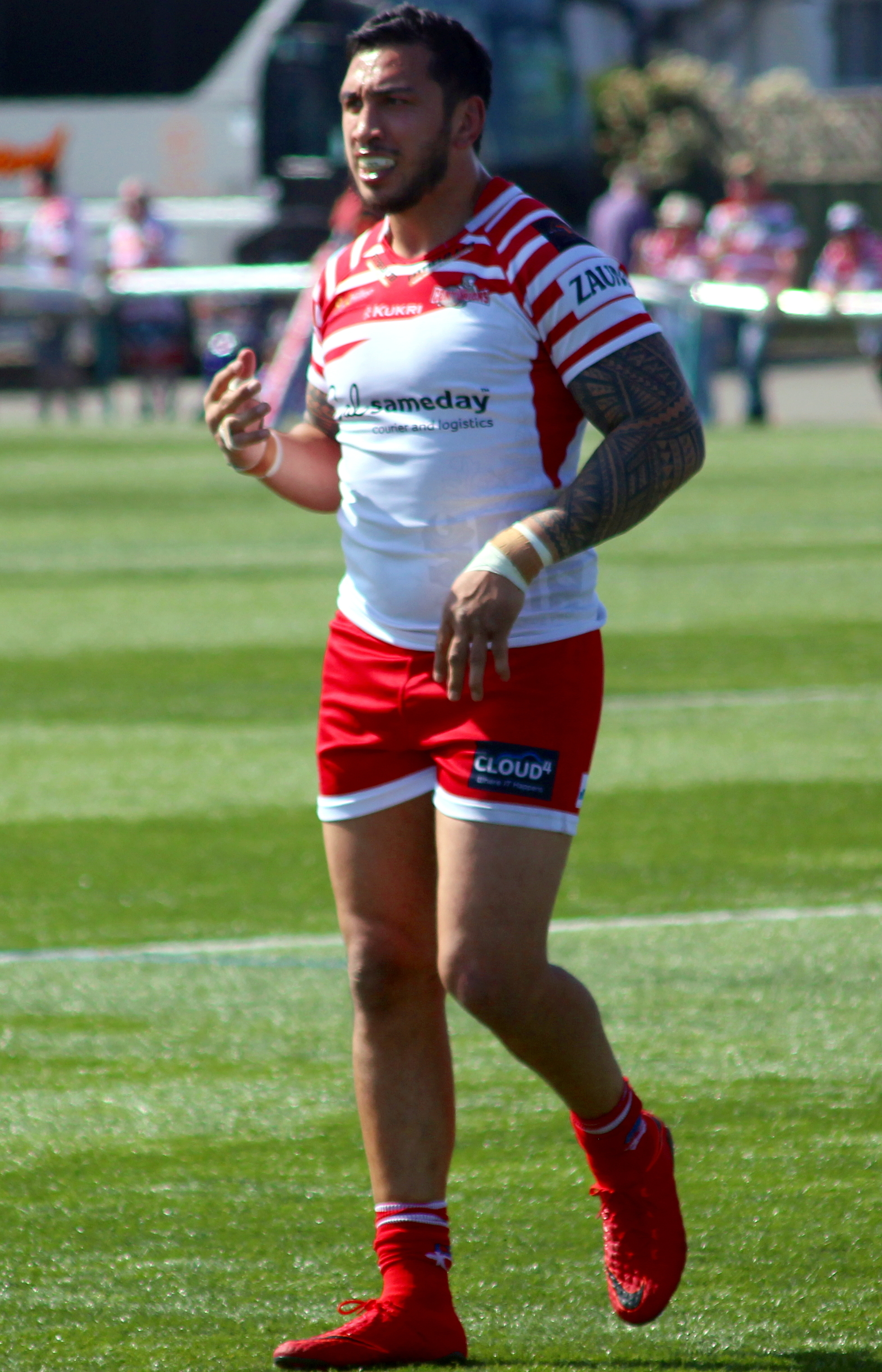

Personal information
- Full name: Harrison Luther Mata'afa Hansen
- Born: 26 October 1985 (age 41) Auckland, New Zealand
- Height: 186 cm (6 ft 1 in)
- Weight: 112 kg (17 st 9 lb)

Playing information
- Position: Second-row, Loose forward
Club
Years	Team	Pld	T	G	FG	P
2004–13	Wigan Warriors	243	43	0	0	172
2014–15	Salford Red Devils	52	9	0	0	36
2016–18	Leigh Centurions	84	22	0	0	88
2018–19	Widnes Vikings	33	4	0	0	16
2020–24	Toulouse Olympique	90	5	0	0	20
2024–	Baroudeurs de Pia XIII	8	1	0	0	4
	Total	510	84	0	0	336
Representative
Years	Team	Pld	T	G	FG	P
2006	New Zealand	1	0	0	0	0
2007–13	Samoa	6	2	0	0	8
- Source: As of 1 November 2024

Harrison Luther Mata'afa Hansen (born 26 October 1985) is a professional rugby league footballer who plays as a second-row and loose forward for Baroudeurs de Pia XIII in the French domestic Super XIII league. He has played for Samoa and New Zealand at international level.

He has also played for the Wigan Warriors, Salford Red Devils, Leigh Centurions and the Widnes Vikings in the Super League. During his time with Wigan, he won two Super League Grand Finals and two Challenge Cups.

== Background ==
Hansen was born in Auckland, New Zealand.

== Early life ==
Hansen is the son of the rugby league footballer for Salford and Swinton, Shane Hansen. He is a product of the Folly Lane ARLFC who play at the Blue Ribbon Field, Pendlebury. Hansen attended the same Swinton school, Moorside High School, as Manchester United's Ryan Giggs. He is of Samoan, Chinese, and Scottish descent.

Hansen impressed in Wigan's Academy setup and was signed on a new two-year deal in July 2003.

== Club career ==
Hansen continued his development by being promoted to the first team setup for Super League IX. He made his first team début in Terry O'Connor's Testimonial match against London Broncos. He went on to make six substitute appearances in the season.

In 2005, Hansen became a more established first team regular in the second row, partly due to the departure of Andy Farrell, and injuries to Sean O'Loughlin and Gareth Hock. He signed a new two-year contract with the club in April 2005, and an extended four-year deal with Wigan on 14 November 2006, keeping him at the club until 2010.

Hansen played in the 2010 Super League Grand Final victory over St Helens at Old Trafford.

Hansen's 2011's Super League XVI started with a try against St Helens during the season-opening Magic Weekend event, which was followed up with another try against Bradford Bulls the week after. Hansen scored again in Round 3's match against Salford, however in Round 12 during a victory against Wakefield Trinity, he suffered an injury which would keep him out of action for at least a month.

Hansen played as a second-row forward in the 2011 Challenge Cup Final 28–18 victory over the Leeds Rhinos at Wembley Stadium.

Hansen played in both the 2013 Challenge Cup Final victory over Hull F.C. at Wembley Stadium and the 2013 Super League Grand Final victory over the Warrington Wolves at Old Trafford.

In 2013, Hansen signed for Salford Red Devils for an undisclosed fee, signing a four-year contract. Upon signing, he claimed it was the influence of Marwan Koukash that meant he was signing, and that joining Salford would be "a great new challenge. I have achieved everything I could at Wigan and had a great time there. I'm not just coming to Salford for an easy ride".

=== Toulouse Olympique ===
On 18 September 2019, Widnes announced that Hansen had left them and signed a one-year contract with Toulouse for the 2020 season.

On 10 October 2021, Hansen played for Toulouse in their victory over Featherstone in the Million Pound Game which saw the club promoted to the Super League for the first time in their history. Three days later Toulouse announced that Hansen had signed a one-year contract extension until the end of the 2022 season. Hansen played 20 games for the club in their 2022 Super League campaign as they finished bottom of the table and were relegated back to the RFL Championship. On 15 October 2023, Hansen played in Toulouse Olympique's upset loss in the Million Pound Game against the London Broncos. On 19 October 2024, Hansen played in Toulouse's second successive Championship grand final defeat.

=== Baroudeurs de Pia XIII ===
On 31 October 2024, it was reported that he had signed for Baroudeurs de Pia XIII in the Super XIII

On 6 June 2026, Hansen played in the 2025–26 Super XIII final in which Pia won 31–30 against AS Carcassonne.

== Representative career ==
Eligible for England, New Zealand and Samoa, Hansen represented England at youth level. However, in 2006 he was called up into the New Zealand squad for the mid season international against Great Britain. He later switched his allegiance to Samoa, and made his Samoa début in 2007.

Hansen was part of the Samoan squad for the 2008 Rugby League World Cup.

In 2009 Hansen was named as part of the Samoan side for the Pacific Cup.

Following the withdrawal of Roy Asotasi, Hansen was named Samoa's captain for the 2013 Rugby League World Cup. However just before the tournament kicked off, he suffered an injury, forcing him out of the tournament. He handed the captaincy over to Iosia Soliola.
