= Kevin Locke (rugby league) =

New Zealand rugby league footballer

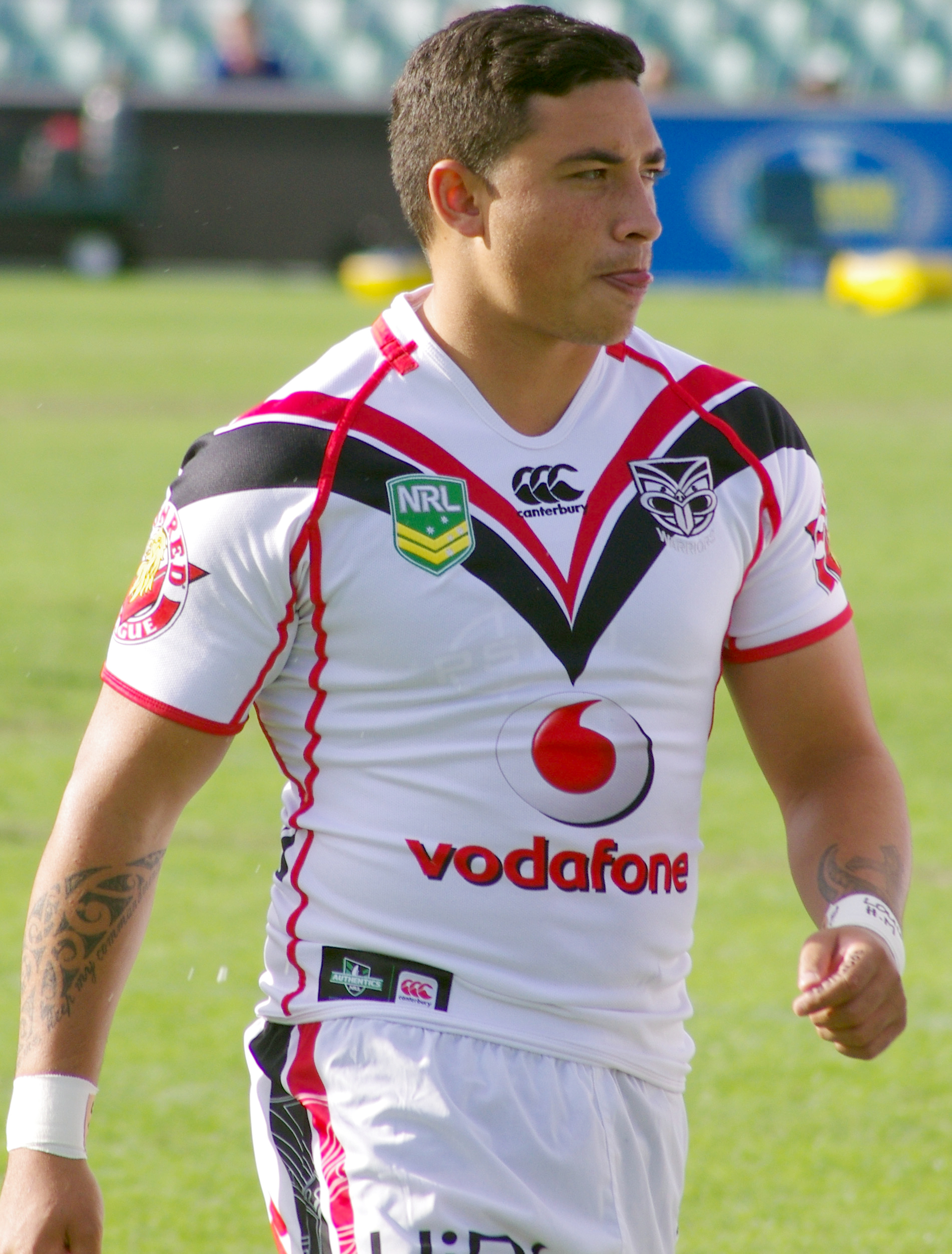

Personal information
- Full name: Kevin Samuel Locke
- Born: 4 April 1989 (age 37) Auckland, New Zealand
- Height: 175 cm (5 ft 9 in)
- Weight: 87 kg (13 st 10 lb)

Playing information
- Position: Fullback, Wing
Club
Years	Team	Pld	T	G	FG	P
2009–14	New Zealand Warriors	89	26	24	0	152
2014–15	Salford Red Devils	13	6	11	0	46
2015	Wakefield Trinity Wildcats	5	2	0	0	8
	Total	107	34	35	0	206
Representative
Years	Team	Pld	T	G	FG	P
2008–20	New Zealand Māori	8	2	3	0	6
2011–13	New Zealand	8	2	0	0	8
- Source: As of 29 July 2023

Kevin Samuel Locke (born 4 April 1989), also known by the nickname of "Knobby", is a New Zealand former professional rugby league footballer who plays for the Northcote Tigers in the Auckland Rugby League. He previously played for the New Zealand Warriors in the National Rugby League and for the Salford Red Devils and Wakefield Trinity Wildcats in the Super League. He primarily plays as a fullback and wing.

== Playing career ==
A Northcote Tigers junior who attended Northcote college, Locke first gained attention when he played for the Auckland Lions in the NSWRL Premier League in 2007. In 2008 he was signed by the New Zealand Warriors and played in the Toyota Cup, finishing the season as the competition's second highest points scorer.

On 31 May 2009 Locke made his first grade début in round 12 against the Wests Tigers. He scored two tries and kicked one goal on début as the Warriors won 14–0. The Warriors failed to make the finals of the 2009 NRL Premiership, but Locke finished the season as the club's top point-scorer. He finished his Toyota Cup career at the end of 2009, having made thirty appearances, scoring eighteen tries and ninety nine goals.

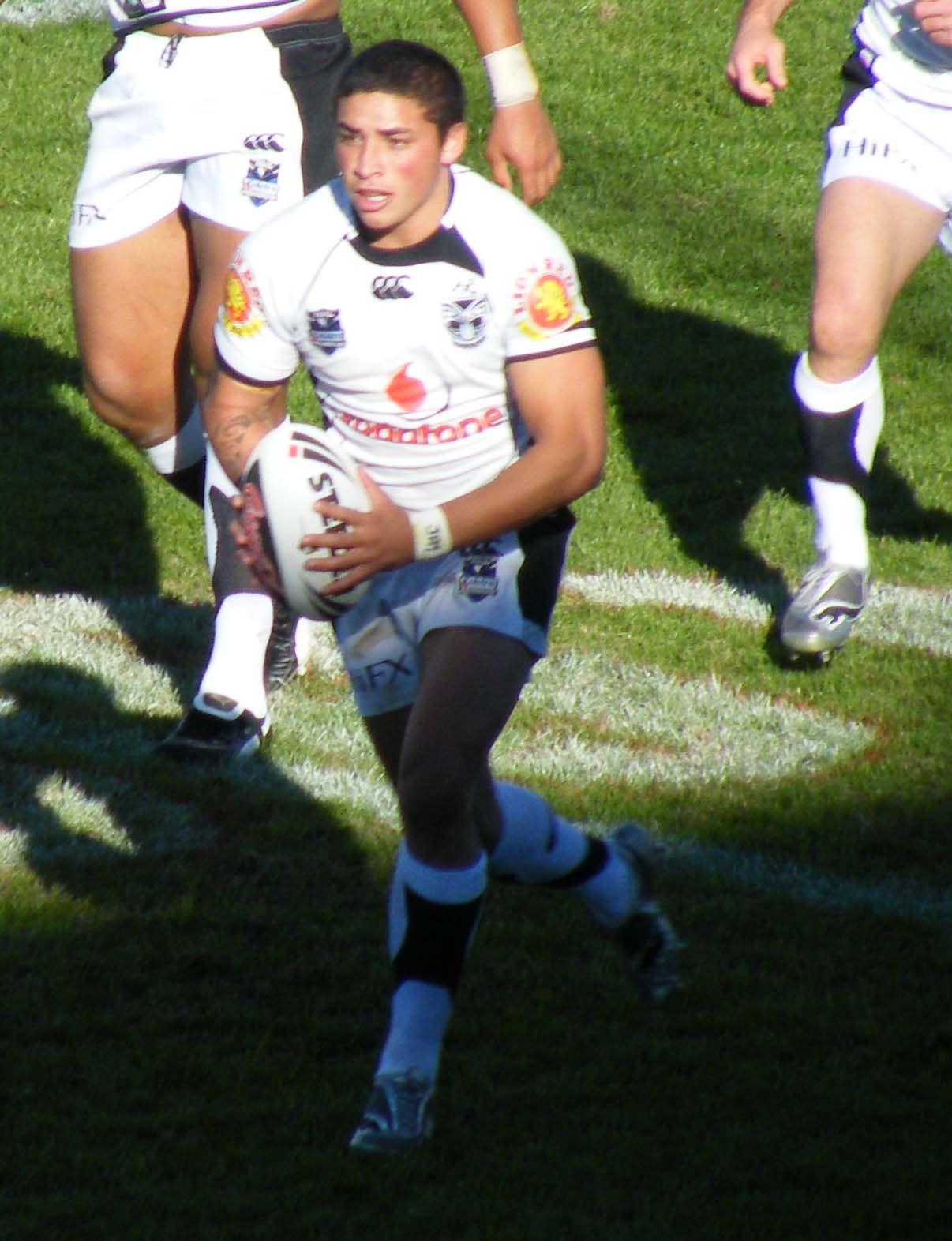
Locke playing for the Warriors in 2009

On 27 June 2010, Locke grabbed his first hat-trick in first grade, bagging three tries as the Warriors defeated the Sydney Roosters 20–18 at AMI Stadium in Christchurch. In scoring his third and final try, Locke injured his hip when colliding with the goalpost, but it was later disclosed that the injury was not as serious as was first feared.

Lock played fullback for the New Zealand Warriors in their 24–10 loss to the Manly-Warringah Sea Eagles in the 2011 NRL Grand Final. The game was played in front of 81,988 fans at the ANZ Stadium in Sydney.

Locke remained at the club for 2012 after the New Zealand Warriors exercised an option on his contract. He then signed a contract with the club until the end of the 2014 season. However, Locke's position with the warriors was put under threat by the signing of English fullback Sam Tomkins from Wigan.

In May 2014, Salford Red Devils RLFC of the Super League announced Locke had signed a three-year deal to play for them, beginning in October 2014 ahead of the 2015 season, having rejected offers from Union clubs Edinburgh Rugby and Glasgow Warriors. The Salford club then negotiated his early release from the New Zealand Warriors, where in 2014 he had languished in the Warriors NSW Cup side with Tomkins preferred in the top grade and he arrived to make his début for the English club during the 2014 season at Huddersfield. Locke scored a try and kicked six goals in a 10–36 win.

On 26 June 2015, he signed for then-bottom Super League club Wakefield Trinity Wildcats until the end of the season, pending a visa being granted. In December 2015, video footage was revealed of Locke being the passenger in a car driven by fellow Wakefield player Tim Smith who had crashed the vehicle into wall of a house. Locke was later released by the club over the incident with Wakefield chairman, Michael Carter confirming the news stating "Kevin won’t play for Wakefield Trinity Wildcats again,” said Carter. “We’ve concluded the case involving him, shook hands and gone our own ways".

In June 2016 Locke signed a deal with Shute Shield rugby union side Southern Districts & agreed to join the Western Sydney Rams in the NRC, however failed to get accustomed to the code-switch & spent most of the season playing in the lower grades, he was subsequently left out of the NRC squad for the Rams. In November 2016, Locke signed a contract to join Manly. He was released during the pre-season and signed with the Sunshine Coast Falcons in the Queensland Cup. He was released and returned to New Zealand to play for the Point Chevalier Pirates in the Fox Memorial Shield mid season, 2016. Locke would later join the Northcote Tigers in the local Auckland competition.

=== Representative career ===
In 2006 Locke made the Junior Kiwis side.

In 2008 Locke played for the New Zealand Māori against the New Zealand national rugby league team in a warm-up to the 2008 Rugby League World Cup.

In 2009, Locke was named by the New Zealand national rugby league team in the 23 man squad to play in the Four Nations tournament in Europe, however he did not play a match for the Kiwis.

Locke again played for the New Zealand Māori in 2010 against England.

On Sunday 16 October 2011 Locke made his début for the Kiwis against the Kangaroos at Hunter Stadium (formerly Ausgrid Stadium), playing in the fullback position. He had a strong game and scored a try, however the Kiwis went down heavily to Australia, with a final scoreline 42–6.

Locke played fullback for New Zealand in the 2013 Rugby League World Cup final at the famous Old Trafford ground in Manchester, England, though Australia won the game 34–2 to regain the World Cup they had lost to the Kiwis in 2008. Due to the presence of Sam Tomkins at the Warriors in 2014, Locke languished in the Warriors NSW Cup side and as a consequence lost his place in the NZ test team to well performed Manly Sea Eagles utility back Peta Hiku for the 2014 Anzac Test at the Sydney Football Stadium.

== Personal life ==
When he was 23, Locke was sentenced in the Auckland District Court to 80 hours community work and fined $1400 for driving while disqualified on 12 May 2012, but avoided a further driving ban; his club also fined him $5000. Locke has been suspended for driving twice as a result of demerit points and has been caught speeding on seven occasions.

Locke married Australian Netballer Chelsea Locke (née Pitman) on 30 December 2015.
