= Jason Walton =

English rugby league footballer

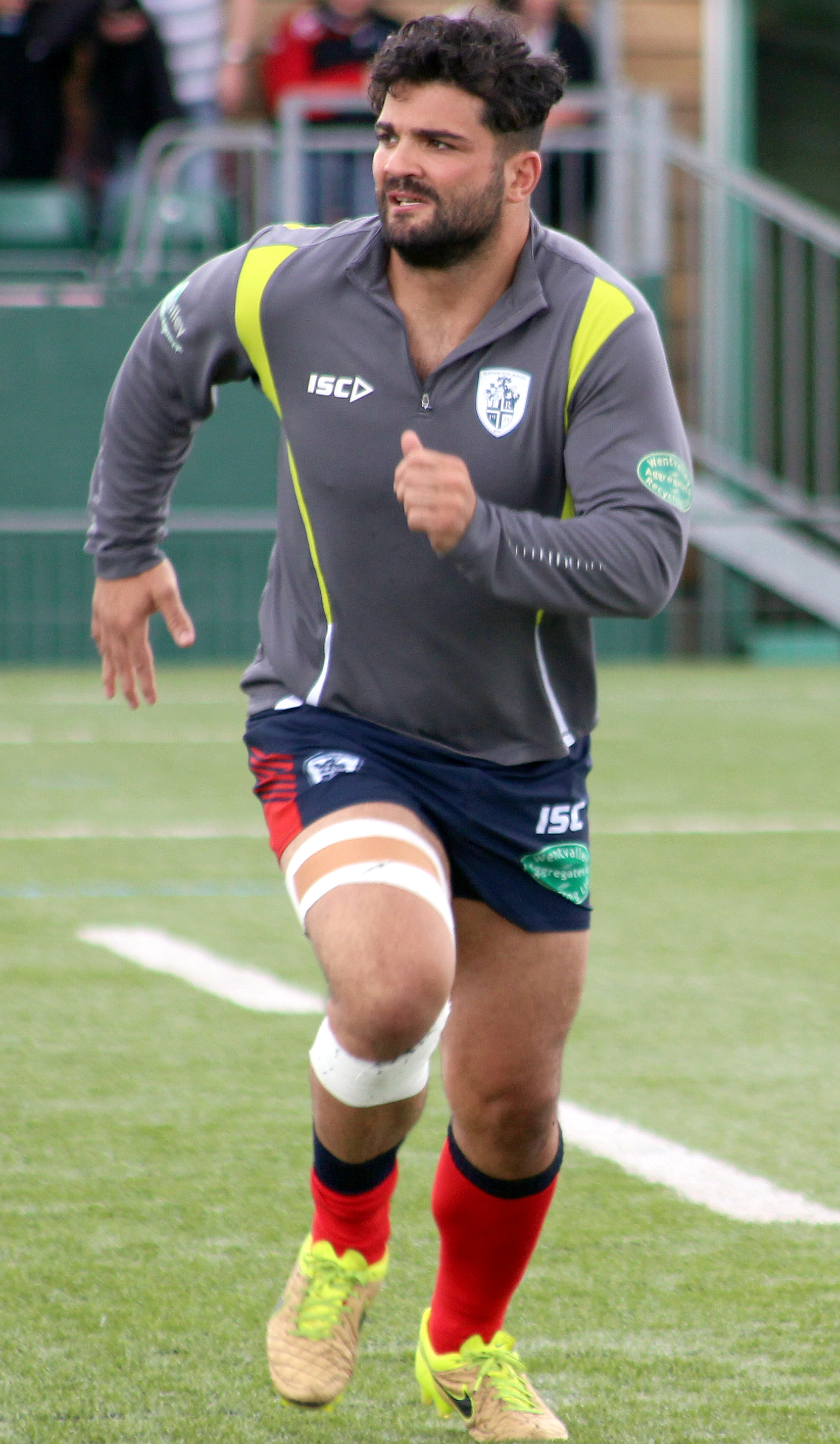

Personal information
- Born: 13 June 1990 (age 36) Leeds, West Yorkshire, England
- Height: 5 ft 10 in (179 cm)
- Weight: 16 st 5 lb (104 kg)

Playing information
- Position: Centre, Second-row
Club
Years	Team	Pld	T	G	FG	P
2009	Salford City Reds	5	0	0	0	0
2010–13	Batley Bulldogs	107	51	0	0	204
2014–15	Salford Red Devils	22	2	0	0	8
2015	London Broncos	9	4	0	0	16
2016	Wakefield Trinity	18	0	0	0	0
2017–19	Featherstone Rovers	26	13	0	0	52
2020–22	Dewsbury Rams	2	0	0	0	0
	Total	189	70	0	0	280
- Source: As of 7 June 2025

Jason Walton (born 13 June 1990) is a former English professional rugby league footballer who played as a second-row forward or centre.

== Background ==
Walton was born in Leeds, West Yorkshire, England.

== Career ==
His first professional club was also Salford Red Devils then known as Salford City Reds, playing five matches from the bench before joining Batley Bulldogs making over 100 appearances. He would rejoin Salford Red Devils for the 2014 season along with fellow Batley Bulldog Greg Johnson making 21 appearances until joining London Broncos on a deal until the end of 2016. He was released by London and signed a one-year deal with Wakefield Trinity Wildcats in December 2015.

Walton appeared for England Under-17s against the Australian Institute of Sport in 2007. His usual position is centre, although he is also used in the second row.

== Featherstone Rovers ==
Walton signed a two-year deal with RFL Championship side the Bradford Bulls. However Bradford were liquidated before the start of the 2017 season. Walton then signed with Featherstone Rovers.
