= Gareth Owen (rugby league, born 1992) =

English professional rugby league footballer

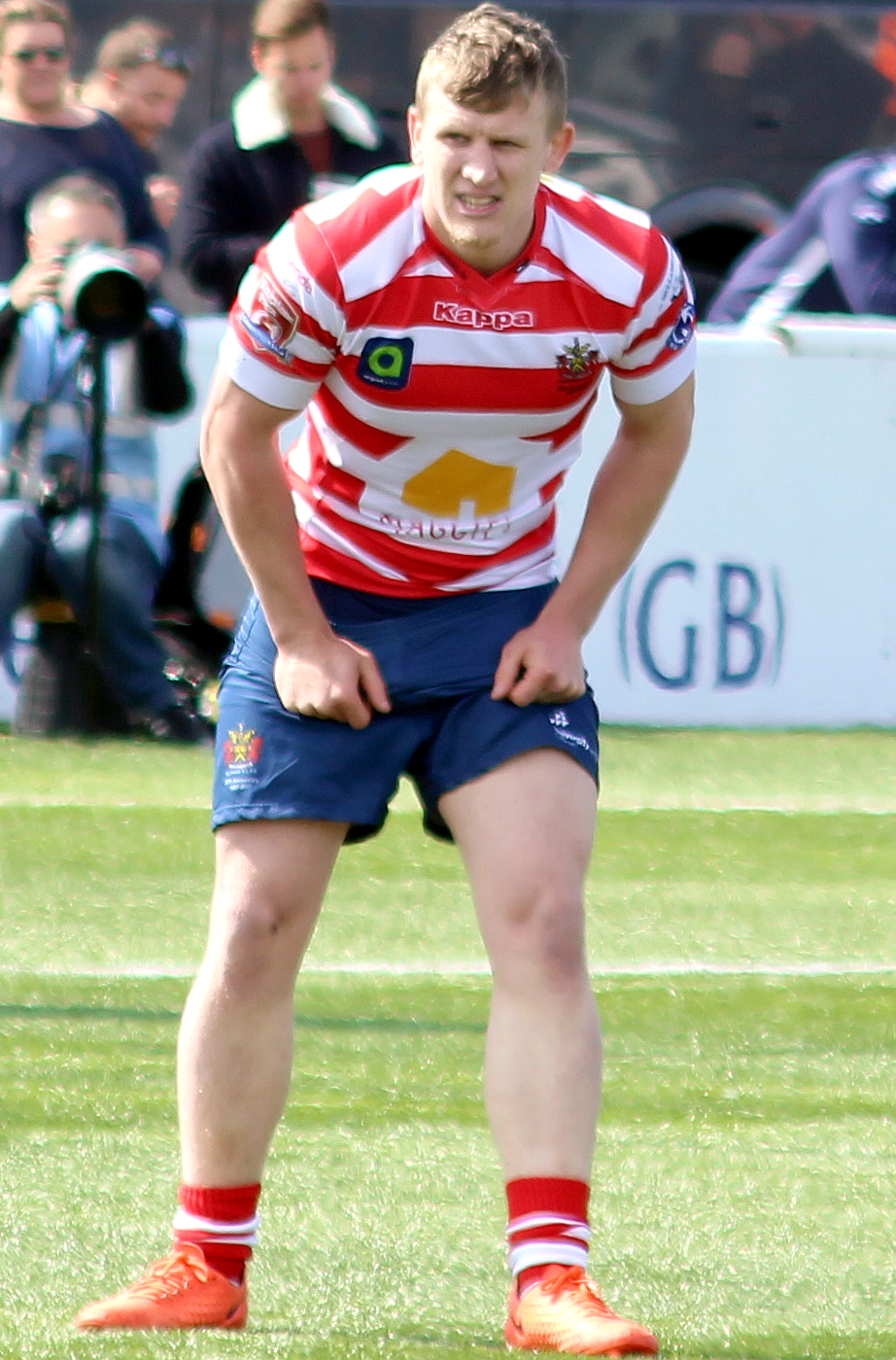

Personal information
- Full name: Gareth Owen
- Born: 3 July 1992 (age 33) Oldham, Greater Manchester, England

Playing information
- Position: Hooker
Club
Years	Team	Pld	T	G	FG	P
2010–14	Salford City Reds	37	6	0	0	24
2014(loan)	→ Sheffield Eagles	15	6	0	0	24
2014(loan)	→ Oldham	8	0	0	0	0
2015–21	Oldham	145	16	0	0	64
	Total	205	28	0	0	112
- Source: As of 6 May 2026

Gareth Owen (born 3 July 1992) is an English former professional rugby league footballer who played mainly as a Hooker for Salford City Reds, Sheffield Eagles and Oldham.

== Background ==
Owen was born in Oldham, Greater Manchester, England.

== Playing career ==
In August 2010, Owen made his debut for Salford City Reds against Hull Kingston Rovers. In 2014, Owen spent time on loan at Sheffield Eagles where he made 15 appearances, before joining Oldham on loan for the remainder of the season.

Owen's move to Oldham was made permanent ahead of the 2015 season, and he was appointed team captain in 2017. In September 2021, Owen announced that he would retire at the end on the 2021 season.

After retiring from professional rugby league, Owen joined local amateur side Waterhead Warriors.
