= Sebastine Ikahihifo =

New Zealand rugby league footballer

Seb Ikahihifo
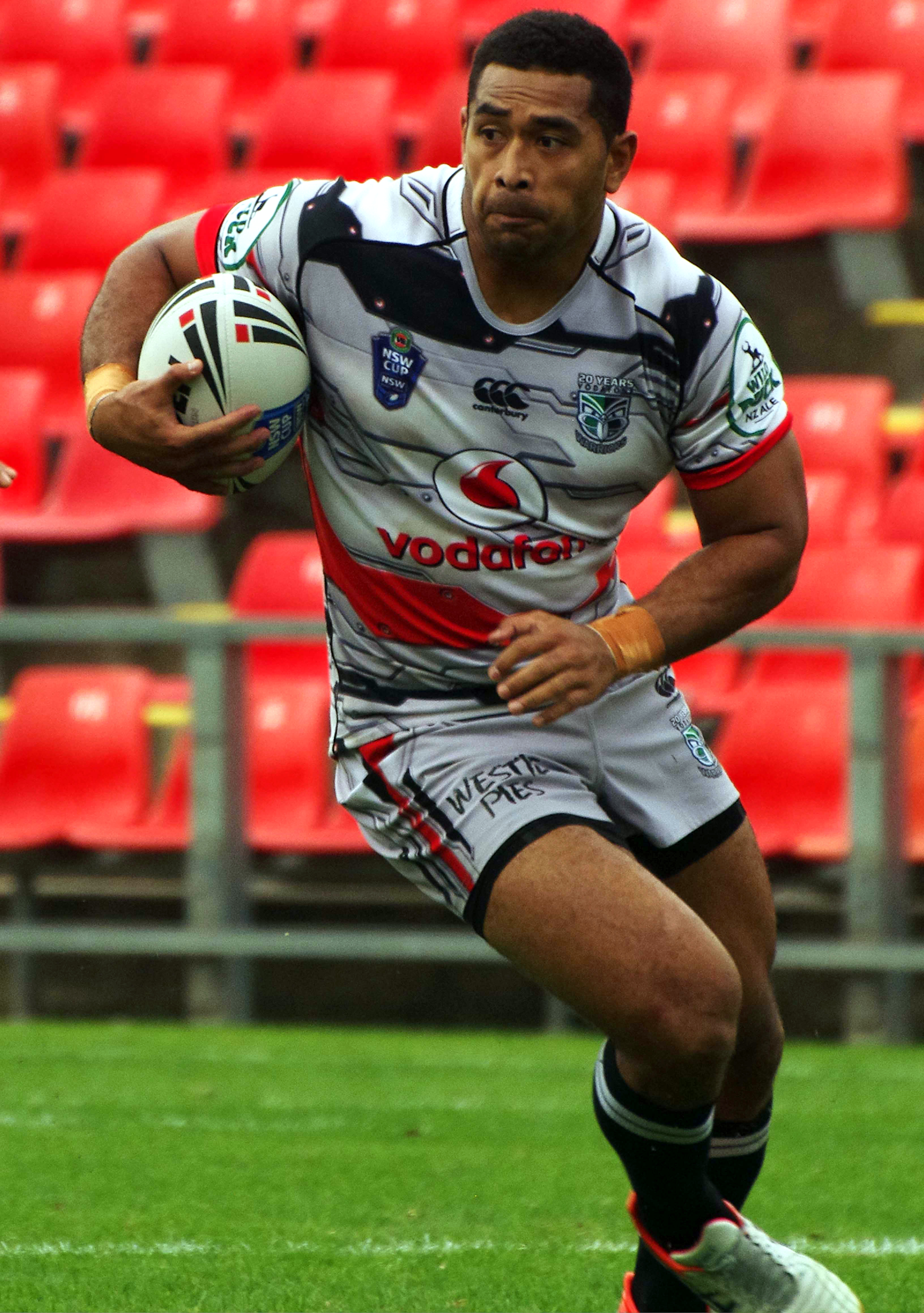

Personal information
- Full name: Sebastine Ikahihifo
- Born: 27 January 1991 (age 35) Auckland, New Zealand
- Height: 6 ft 0 in (1.84 m)
- Weight: 16 st 12 lb (107 kg)

Playing information
- Position: Prop, Loose forward
Club
Years	Team	Pld	T	G	FG	P
2012–15	New Zealand Warriors	39	1	0	0	4
2016–24	Huddersfield Giants	140	5	0	0	8
2020(loan)	→ Salford Red Devils	17	0	0	0	0
2021(loan)	→ Salford Red Devils	15	1	0	0	4
2025–26	Otahuhu Leopards	15	6	0	0	24
	Total	226	13	0	0	40
- Source: As of 23 July 2025

Sebastine Ikahihifo (born 27 January 1991) is a New Zealand professional rugby league footballer who plays as a prop and loose forward, most recently for the Huddersfield Giants in the Super League.

He previously played for the New Zealand Warriors in the NRL.

== Background ==
Ikahihifo was born in Auckland, New Zealand, and is of Tongan descent.

He played his junior rugby league for the Mangere East Hawks.

== Playing career ==
=== Early career ===
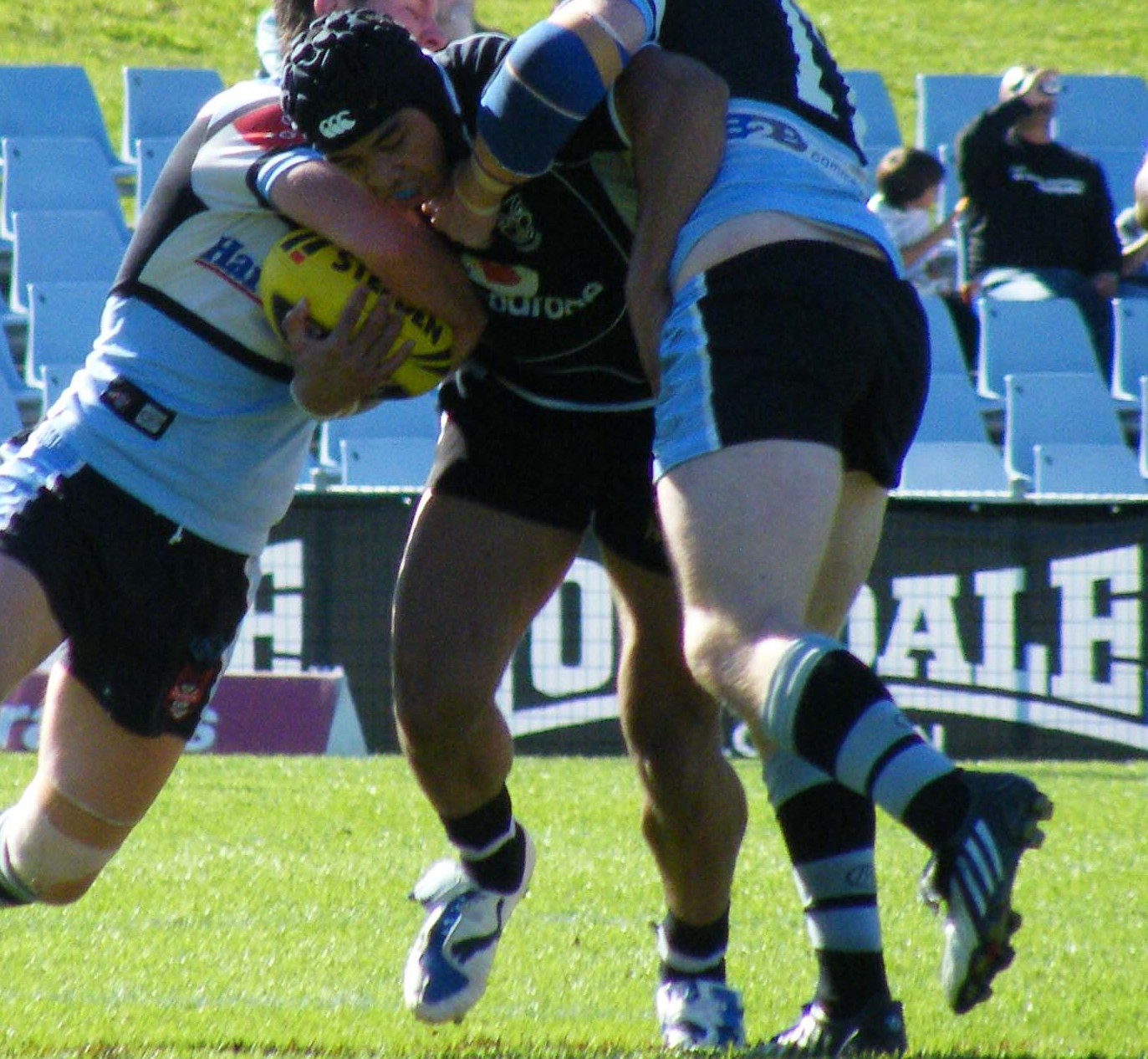
Ikahihifo playing for the Warriors in 2009

He signed for the New Zealand Warriors in 2010 and played 36 games in the Toyota Cup, being part of the 2010 and 2011 grand final victories. In 2012, Ikahihifo played for the Auckland Vulcans in the NSW Cup.

=== 2012 ===
In round 21 of the 2012 NRL season, Ikahihifo made his first grade début for the New Zealand Warriors against the Manly-Warringah Sea Eagles playing off the interchange bench in the Warriors' 24–22 loss at NIB Stadium in Perth. Ikahihifo played in 4 matches for the Warriors in the 2012 NRL season.

=== 2013 ===
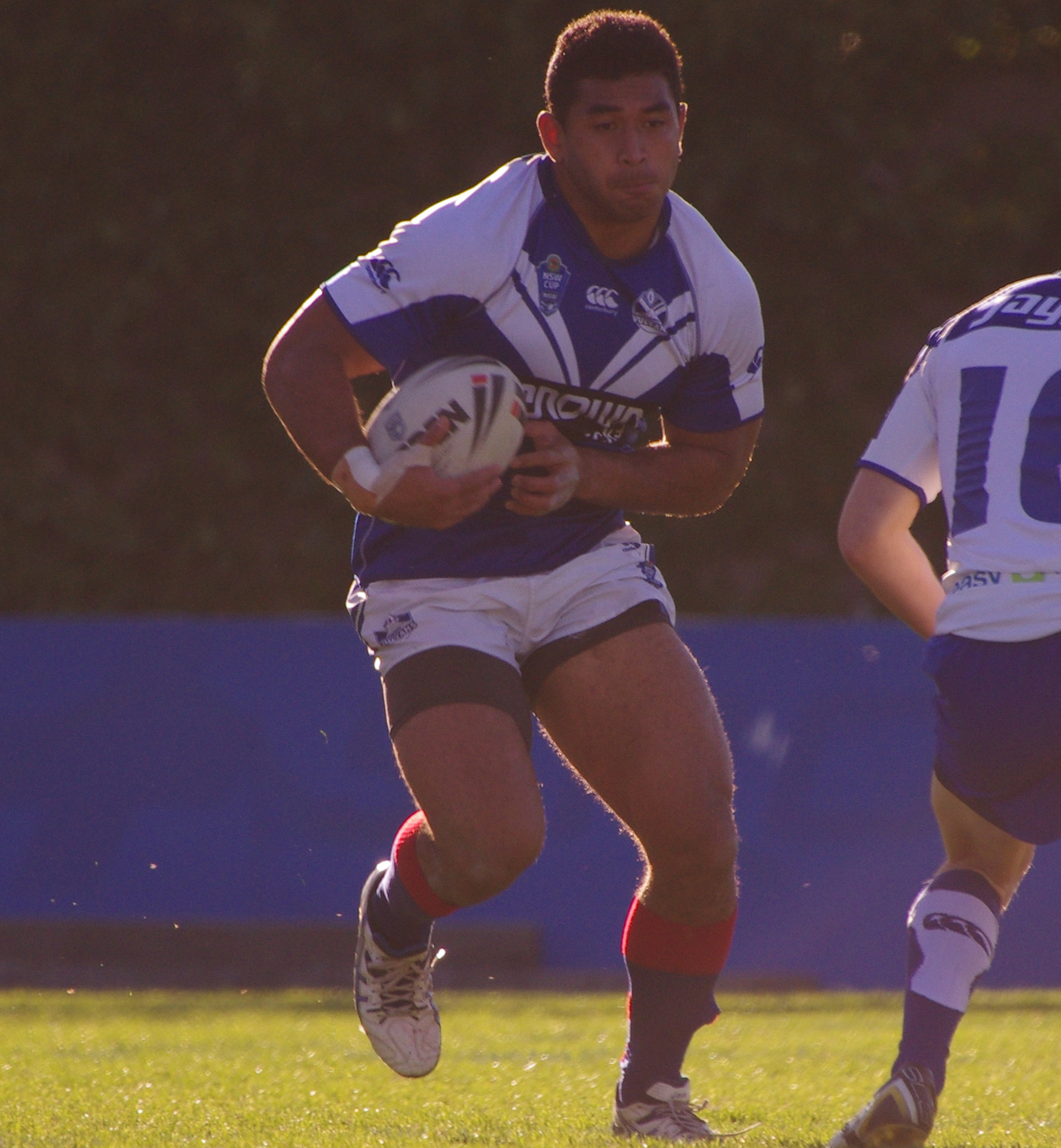
Ikahihifo playing for the Auckland Vulcans in 2013

Ikahihifo finished the 2013 NRL season with him playing in 8 matches for the Warriors.

=== 2014 ===
In February 2014, Ikahihifo was selected in the Warriors' inaugural 2014 Auckland Nines squad. In June 2014, Ikahihifo had his contract extended to the end of the 2015 season. Ikahihifo finished off the Warriors' 2014 NRL season with him playing in 18 matches.

=== 2015 ===
On 16 January, Ikahihifo was named in the Warriors' 2015 NRL Auckland Nines wider training squad but did not make the final squad. In Round 5 against the Melbourne Storm, he scored his first NRL career try in the Warriors' 30–14 loss at AAMI Park. He finished off the season having played in 9 matches and scoring a try. On 23 September, he signed a two-year contract with the St. George Illawarra Dragons starting in 2016.

=== 2016 ===
On 29 January, Ikahihifo was named in St. George Illawarra's 2016 Auckland Nines squad. He was released from his St. George contract without making an appearance for the club in order to join the Huddersfield Giants in the Super League as a mid-season transfer.

=== 2017 ===
In 2017, Ikahihifo was named in the Super League Dream Team.

=== 2018 ===
He made a total of 20 appearances for Huddersfield in all competitions as the club missed the finals series finishing 5th.

=== 2019 ===
He made a total of 18 appearances in the 2019 season as Huddersfield finished a disappointing 10th.

=== 2020 ===
He joined Salford on loan in the 2020 season. He later played for Salford in their 2020 Challenge Cup Final defeat against Leeds.

=== 2021 ===
On 13 November 2020, the club website reported that they would extend the loan period to cover the 2021 season.

=== 2022 ===
He played a total of 13 matches for Huddersfield in the 2022 Super League season as Huddersfield reached the playoffs. He played in Huddersfield's shock 28–0 loss to Salford in the elimination playoff.

=== 2023 ===
He played 21 matches with Huddersfield in the 2023 Super League season as the club finished ninth on the table and missed the playoffs.

=== 2024 ===
Ikahihifo played 24 games for Huddersfield in the 2024 Super League season as the club finished 9th on the table.

== Statistics ==
Year	Team	Games	Tries	Pts
2012	New Zealand Warriors	4		
2013	New Zealand Warriors	8		
2014	New Zealand Warriors	18		
2015	New Zealand Warriors	9	1	4
2016	Huddersfield Giants	11		
2017	Huddersfield Giants	29		
2018	Huddersfield Giants	20		
2019	Huddersfield Giants	18	1	4
2020	Salford (loan)	17		
2021	Salford (loan)	15	1	4
2022	Huddersfield Giants	13	1	4
2023	Huddersfield Giants	22	1	4
2024	Huddersfield Giants	27	2	8
	Totals	211	7	16
