= Greg Johnson (rugby league) =

Jamaica international rugby league footballer

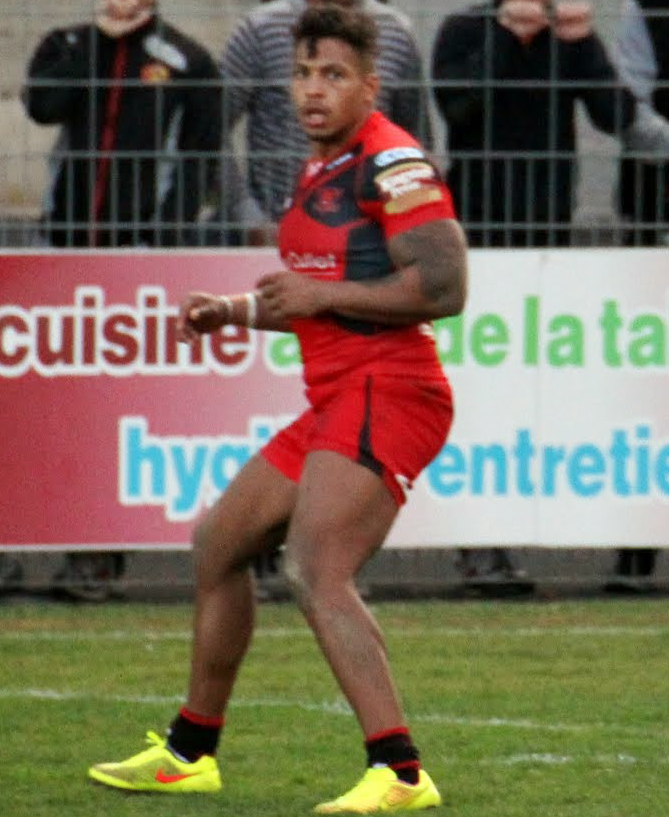

Personal information
- Full name: Gregory Johnson
- Born: 20 February 1990 (age 36) Huddersfield, West Yorkshire, England
- Height: 5 ft 9 in (1.76 m)
- Weight: 15 st 6 lb (98 kg)

Playing information
- Position: Wing
Club
Years	Team	Pld	T	G	FG	P
2011	Huddersfield Giants	0	0	0	0	0
2011(loan)	→ Batley Bulldogs	0	0	0	0	0
2011	Wakefield Trinity	12	2	0	0	8
2013	Batley Bulldogs	28	18	0	0	72
2014–19	Salford Red Devils	106	50	1	0	202
2020	Bradford Bulls	2	0	0	0	0
2021–	Batley Bulldogs	17	11	0	0	44
	Total	165	81	1	0	326
Representative
Years	Team	Pld	T	G	FG	P
2010–	Jamaica	6	3	0	0	12
- Source: As of 30 October 2022

Greg Johnson (born 20 February 1990) is a Jamaica international rugby league footballer who plays as a winger for the Batley Bulldogs in the RFL Championship.

He played for the Wakefield Trinity Wildcats and the Salford Red Devils in the Super League and Batley in the Championship. He was contracted to the Huddersfield Giants in the top flight, and spent time on loan from the Giants at the Bulldogs in the second tier.

== Background ==
Greg Johnson was born in Huddersfield, West Yorkshire, England.

== Playing career ==
A Jamaica international, Johnson made his Super League début for the Wakefield Trinity Wildcats in 2011 and amassed a total of 2 tries in 12 appearances. His contract with Wakefield was immediately terminated following his conviction.

When released from prison in 2013, he was signed by the Batley Bulldogs, where he played regularly. He scored 18 tries in 28 appearances and attracted interest from the Salford City Reds, with whom he signed for the 2014 season.

Johnson established himself as a first-choice player for Salford in 2014, scoring 10 tries in 20 appearances. His first try of the season against the Widnes Vikings has been claimed to be a try of the season contender, as he bust three tackles in a run from his own half before sidestepping Rhys Hanbury to score.

=== Bradford Bulls ===
Johnson was released by the Bradford Bulls in September 2020.

=== Batley Bulldogs ===
On 2 Jul 2021 it was reported that he had signed for the Batley Bulldogs in the RFL Championship.
