= Logan Tomkins =

English rugby league footballer

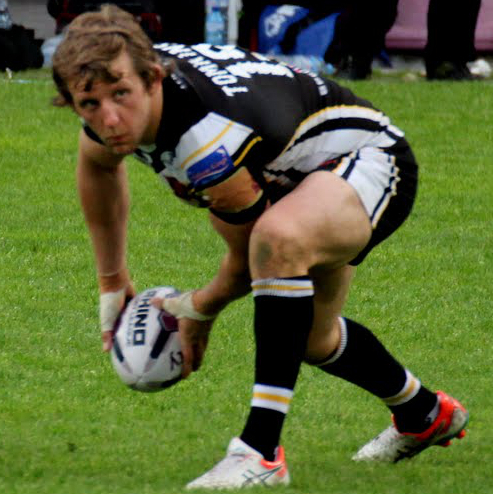

Personal information
- Born: 1 August 1992 (age 34) Wigan, Greater Manchester, England
- Height: 5 ft 11 in (1.80 m)
- Weight: 14 st 5 lb (91 kg)

Playing information
- Position: Hooker
Club
Years	Team	Pld	T	G	FG	P
2011–15	Wigan Warriors	47	3	0	0	12
2011(DR)	→ Widnes Vikings	14	6	0	0	24
2014(loan)	→ Salford Red Devils	18	3	0	0	12
2015(DR)	→ Workington Town	2	0	0	0	0
2015(loan)	→ Salford Red Devils	15	0	0	0	0
2016–19	Salford Red Devils	104	5	0	0	20
2020	Widnes Vikings	6	0	0	0	0
	Total	206	17	0	0	68
- Source: As of 17 December 2020
- Relatives: Joel Tomkins (brother); Sam Tomkins (brother)

Logan Tomkins is a retired rugby league footballer who most recently played as a hooker for the Widnes Vikings in the Championship.

He has played for the Wigan Warriors in the Super League, and on loan from Wigan at the Widnes Vikings and Workington Town in the Championship, and the Salford Red Devils in the top flight. Tomkins has also spent four seasons at Salford after his loan spell there.

== Background ==
Tomkins was born in Wigan, Greater Manchester, England. He is the younger brother of fellow professionals Joel and Sam Tomkins.

== Playing career ==
=== Wigan ===
Tomkins made his début in Super League on 11 March 2012 in Wigan's away match at his former dual registration club; Widnes.

He played in the 2013 Challenge Cup Final victory over Hull F.C. at Wembley Stadium.

==== Widnes ====
During 2011, Tomkins played 14 times on dual registration at Widnes. He scored 6 tries for the then Championship Side.

==== Salford loans ====
In 2014, Logan joined Salford on a loan deal. He made his first appearance for the club against Bradford Bulls in Salford's 38-24 win. In his third appearance, against Leeds, Logan scored his team's only try in Salford's 32-4 defeat. On 22 April 2014, Logan agreed to stay with Salford for the rest of the 2014 season.

Tomkins returned to Salford on loan again in 2015.

==== Workington ====
Also in 2015, Tomkins played two games for Workington Town on dual registration from Wigan.

=== Salford ===
Logan Tomkins made the permanent switch to Salford on 25 November 2015, signing a one-year deal for the 2016 season.

He played in the 2019 Super League Grand Final defeat by St. Helens at Old Trafford.

=== Widnes ===
Tomkins joined Widnes Vikings ahead of the 2020 RFL Championship, on a one-year deal. After signing a one-year extension, he announced his retirement at the end of the 2021 season.

== Family ==
Logan Tomkins is the youngest brother of former Wigan teammates Joel Tomkins and Sam Tomkins.
