= Shannan McPherson =

Australian rugby league footballer

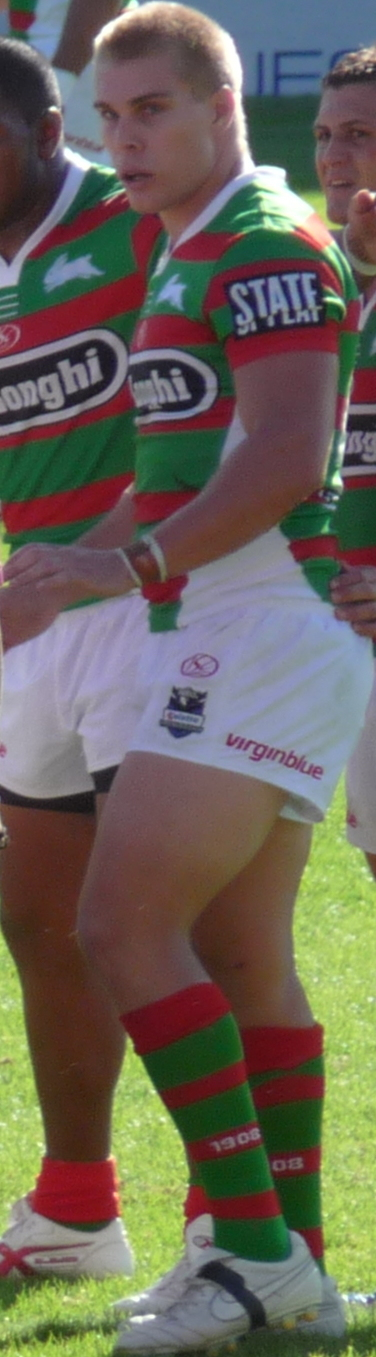

Personal information
- Full name: Shannan William McPherson
- Born: 12 December 1985 (age 40) Sydney, New South Wales, Australia
- Height: 185 cm (6 ft 1 in)
- Weight: 99 kg (15 st 8 lb)

Playing information
- Position: Second-row, Lock, Prop
Club
Years	Team	Pld	T	G	FG	P
2005–11	South Sydney	93	2	0	0	8
2012–14	Salford Red Devils	33	0	0	0	0
	Total	126	2	0	0	8

Shannan McPherson (born 12 December 1985 in Sydney, New South Wales) is an Australian former professional rugby league footballer who played in the 2000s and 2010s. McPherson played with the South Sydney Rabbitohs for seven seasons and then played in the UK for three seasons. He played at either front or second row.

== Early life ==
McPherson was a Souths Junior and played for South Eastern Seagulls growing up.

== Playing career ==
McPherson rose through the ranks, and in 2005, became part of the South Sydney Rabbitohs full-time squad. McPherson played for South Sydney's feeder club side North Sydney in the 2007 NSWRL premier league grand final against the Parramatta Eels which ended in a 20–15 defeat at Telstra Stadium.

On 29 June 2011, it was announced that McPherson had signed a two-year deal with Welsh outfit Crusaders from the 2012 season. Due to the Crusaders withdrawal from Super League, McPherson's deal fell through. McPherson joined Salford Red Devils on a three-year deal.

On 10 June 2014, Salford owner Marwan Koukash announced the release of McPherson due to his request to return to Australia to be reunited with his wife and three kids, who had returned to Australia the previous Year.

On 3 September 2014, it was released that McPherson had signed with the Parramatta Eels for the 2015 season.
