= Marwan Koukash =

British businessman

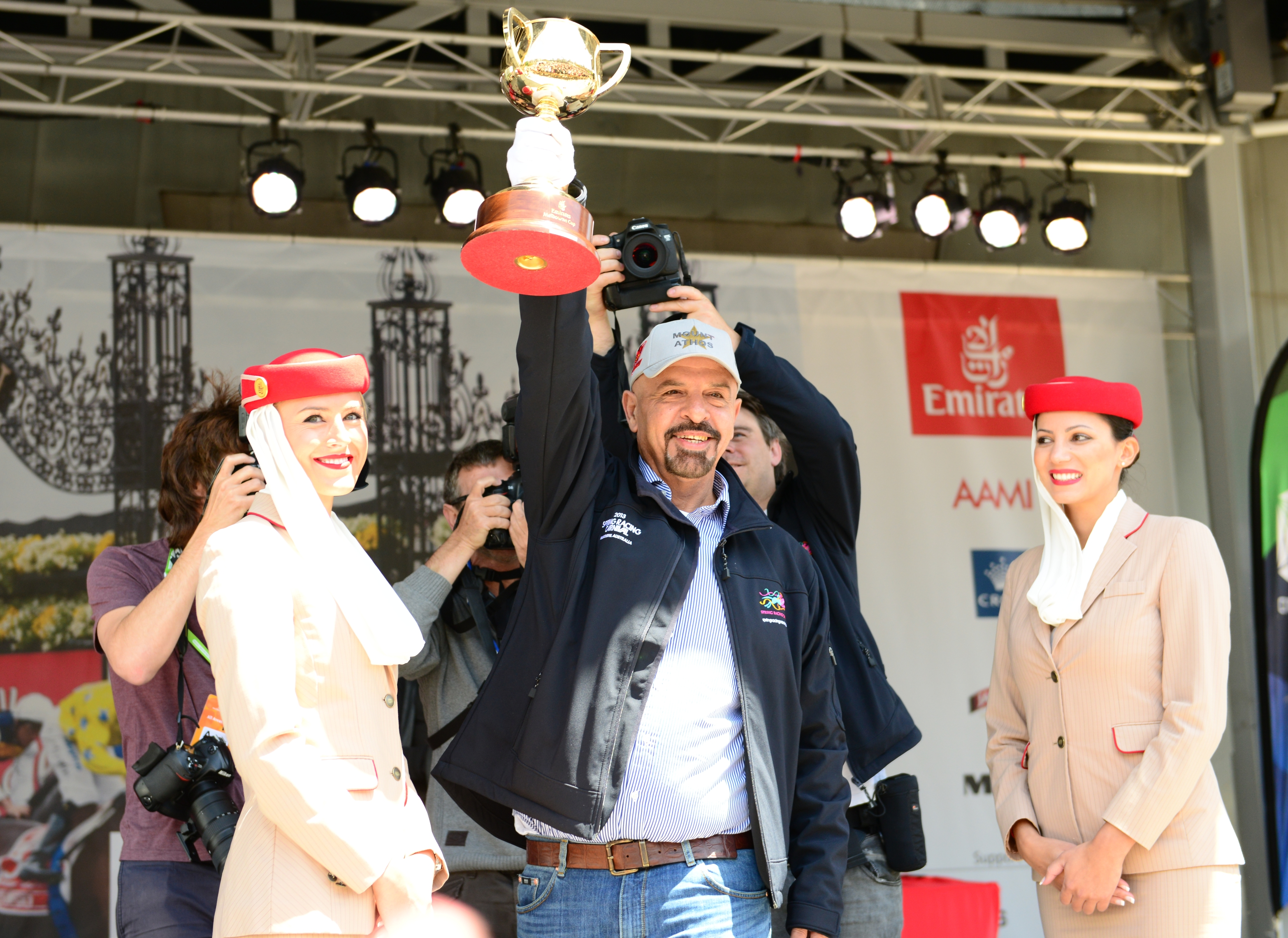
- Marwan Koukash (2013)
- Born: 3 December 1958 (age 67); West Bank
- Occupation: Businessman
- Years active: 1966–present
- Spouse: Mandy Koukash

Marwan Koukash (born in Palestine, December 1958) is a businessman and racehorse owner whose horses have won races including the Critérium de Maisons-Laffitte, Cesarewitch Handicap, City and Suburban Handicap, Ayr Gold Cup and Chester Cup.

A 2018 Channel 4 documentary programme, My Millionaire Migrant Boss, stated his wealth at £50 million. Koukash is often referred to as a multi-millionaire by the media, although he was declared bankrupt in 2022.

== Early life and business career ==
Koukash was born on the west bank of the River Jordan in December 1958 in Palestine. When he was eight years old, a nearby Jordanian army base was bombed by the Israeli Air Force and fear of the planes made his family leave their farm [12] and the family crossed into Jordan before settling in Kuwait, where his father had already been living for 2 years [12]. Eventually, he moved to Britain to progress his education, and settled in St Helens to study at the local technical college.

He graduated from Liverpool John Moores University and progressed to get a PhD in electrical engineering. He taught at the university for five years, and was appointed Director of International Business.

He is also the owner of hotels operated by Hilton such as The Doubletree Hotel in Liverpool.

== Horse racing ==
He was introduced to horse racing by his bank manager, Dave Matthews, and had his first winner in 2007. In 2012, he had 101 winners, who accumulated over £1m in prize money. His racing silks are grey with a gold star and many of his horses are named after his son, Gabrial and daughters, Lexi and Layla. He owns a pre-training facility in Knowsley and uses various trainers including Richard Fahey and Kevin Ryan.

It is claimed that he is the biggest owner of race horses in Britain.

== Rugby League ==
=== Salford Red Devils ===
In 2013, Koukash took over the loss-making Super League club, Salford City Reds. His interest in rugby league began when he went to watch St. Helens matches with his family. He was encouraged to take ownership of Salford by the Rugby Football League chief executive Nigel Wood, who had met Koukash on a flight to Dubai. Koukash aimed to make the club the biggest in Super League, rebranding them as Salford Red Devils in 2013 and signing 14 new players. In 2017, Koukash handed over control of Salford to a community trust.

=== National Rugby League ===
In 2014, Koukash made public his ambitions of purchasing a team in the Australian National Rugby League (NRL) before the 2015 season. The NRL is considered the world's most competitive rugby league competition, in a country where rugby league is far more popular than rugby union.

In 2016, he also announced his plans to take a British team (the "British Bulldogs") and have them play in the NRL in Australia, with the help of airline and hotel sponsorship.
