= Indiana Hoosiers =

Intercollegiate sports teams of Indiana University Bloomington

- University: Indiana University Bloomington
- Nickname: Hoosiers
- NCAA: Division I (FBS)
- Conference: Big Ten (primary); Mountain Pacific Sports Federation (women's water polo)
- Athletic director: Scott Dolson
- Location: Bloomington, Indiana
- Varsity teams: 24
- Football stadium: Memorial Stadium
- Basketball arena: Simon Skjodt Assembly Hall
- Baseball stadium: Bart Kaufman Field
- Softball stadium: Andy Mohr Field
- Soccer stadium: Bill Armstrong Stadium
- Other venues: Cook Hall; Counsilman-Billingsley Aquatics Center; Dale England Rowing Center; Gladstein Fieldhouse; IU Championship Cross Country Course; IU Field Hockey Complex; IU Tennis Center; The Pfau Couse at Indiana University; Robert C. Haugh Complex; The University Gymnasium; Wilkinson Hall
- Colors: Crimson and cream
- Mascot: Hoosier the Bison
- Fight song: Indiana, Our Indiana
- Website: iuhoosiers.com
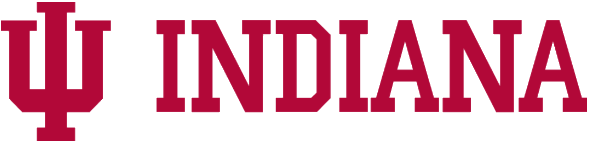

The Indiana Hoosiers are the intercollegiate sports teams and players of Indiana University Bloomington, nicknamed Hoosiers (after the demonym for people from the state of Indiana). The Hoosiers participate in Division I of the National Collegiate Athletic Association (NCAA) in 24 sports and joined the Big Ten Conference on December 1, 1899. The school's official colors are cream and crimson.

The Indiana Hoosiers have won 24 NCAA national championships, one Association for Intercollegiate Athletics for Women (AIAW) national championship, one College Football Playoff championship, and 145 NCAA individual national championships. The Hoosiers' team titles include eight by the men's soccer team, six in a row in men's swimming and diving, five by the men's basketball team, three in men's cross country, and one each in men's track and field, wrestling, and football.

The Hoosiers basketball program has won five NCAA Championships, tying for the fourth-most in history. The 1976 team is the last undefeated NCAA men's basketball champion. A 2018 study listed Indiana as the second most valuable collegiate basketball program in the United States. In Division I soccer, the Hoosiers have the most wins, have won the most National Championships, have appeared in the most College Cups (18), and have the highest winning percentage of any other team.

Indiana has rivalries with the Purdue Boilermakers (Indiana–Purdue rivalry), the Kentucky Wildcats (Indiana–Kentucky rivalry), and the Illinois Fighting Illini (Illinois-Indiana rivalry).

== Traditions ==
=== School colors ===
The school's official colors are cream and crimson. The official IU Crimson is Pantone 201.

Big Ten logo in Indiana's colors

=== Mascot ===
IU student-athletes are known as "Hoosiers", the demonym for natives or residents of Indiana. A bulldog named Ox served as the football team's mascot from 1959 to 1965.

On May 27, 2025, after several teaser videos posted on IU Athletics' social media, "Hoosier the Bison" was revealed as the official mascot of Indiana University. The name "Hoosier the Bison" was used in 1965 when a student-led group first picked the mascot.

=== School songs ===
The Indiana Hoosiers' fight songs are "Indiana, Our Indiana" and "Indiana Fight!" They also have an alma mater song, "Hail to Old IU", and an additional song, ""Chimes of Indiana".

== Sports sponsored ==
Indiana Hoosiers programs
Men's sports	Women's sports
Baseball	Basketball
Basketball	Cross country
Cross country	Field hockey
Football	Golf
Golf	Rowing
Soccer	Soccer
Swimming and diving	Softball
Tennis	Swimming and diving
Track and field^{†}	Tennis
Wrestling	Track and field^{†}
	Volleyball
	Water polo
† – Track and field includes both indoor and outdoor

=== Baseball ===
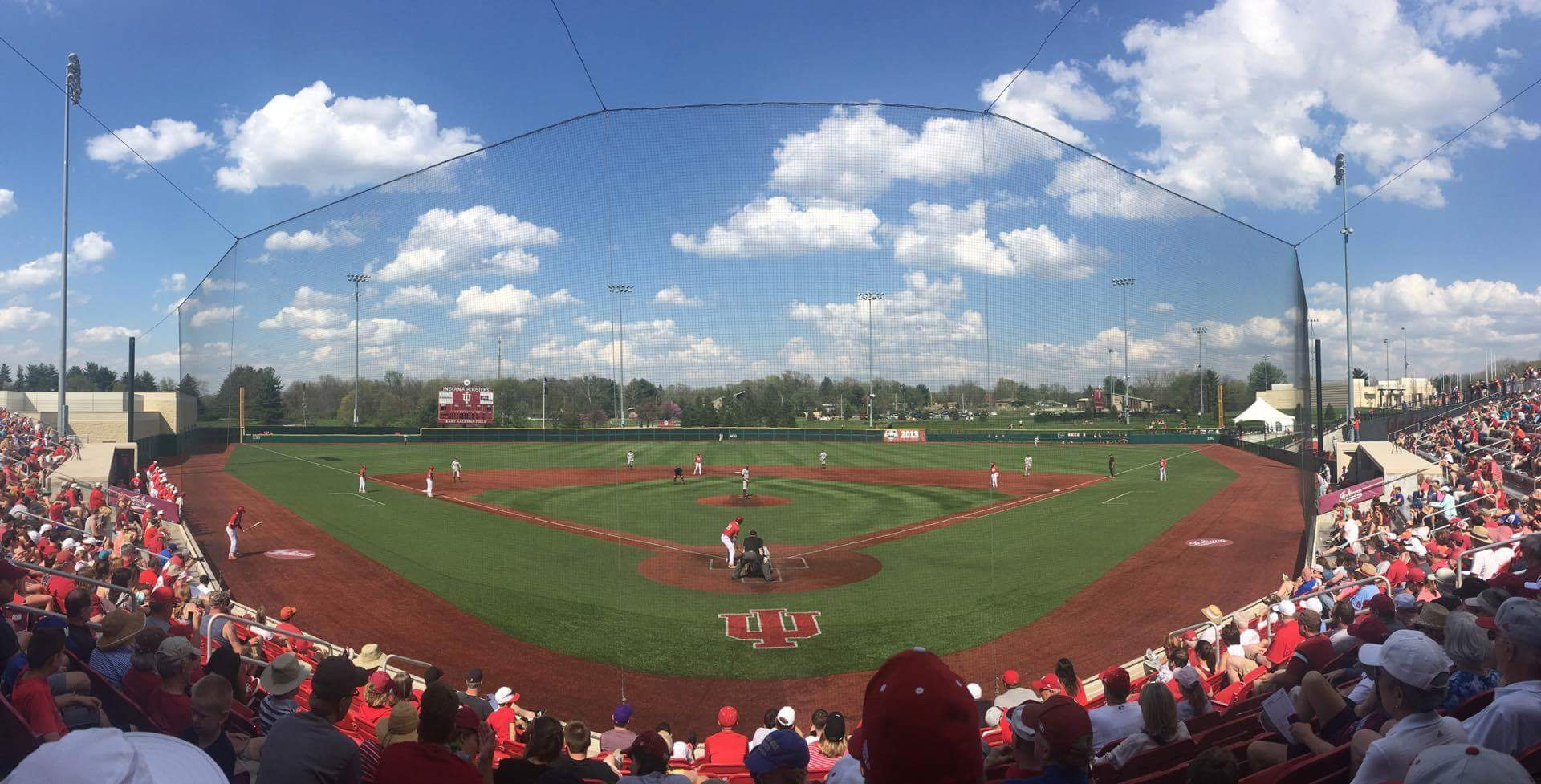
Bart Kaufman Field - 2017

The Hoosiers appeared in the NCAA Tournament in 1996, 2009, 2013, 2014, 2015, 2017, 2018, and 2019, including one appearance at the College World Series. They have won the regular season conference championship seven times, in 1925, 1932, 1938, 1949, 2013, 2014, and 2019. The current head baseball coach of the Hoosiers is Jeff Mercer. Since 2013, the Hoosiers have played at Bart Kaufman Field.

=== Basketball ===
==== Men's basketball ====
The Indiana Hoosiers men's basketball team is the intercollegiate men's basketball program representing Indiana University.

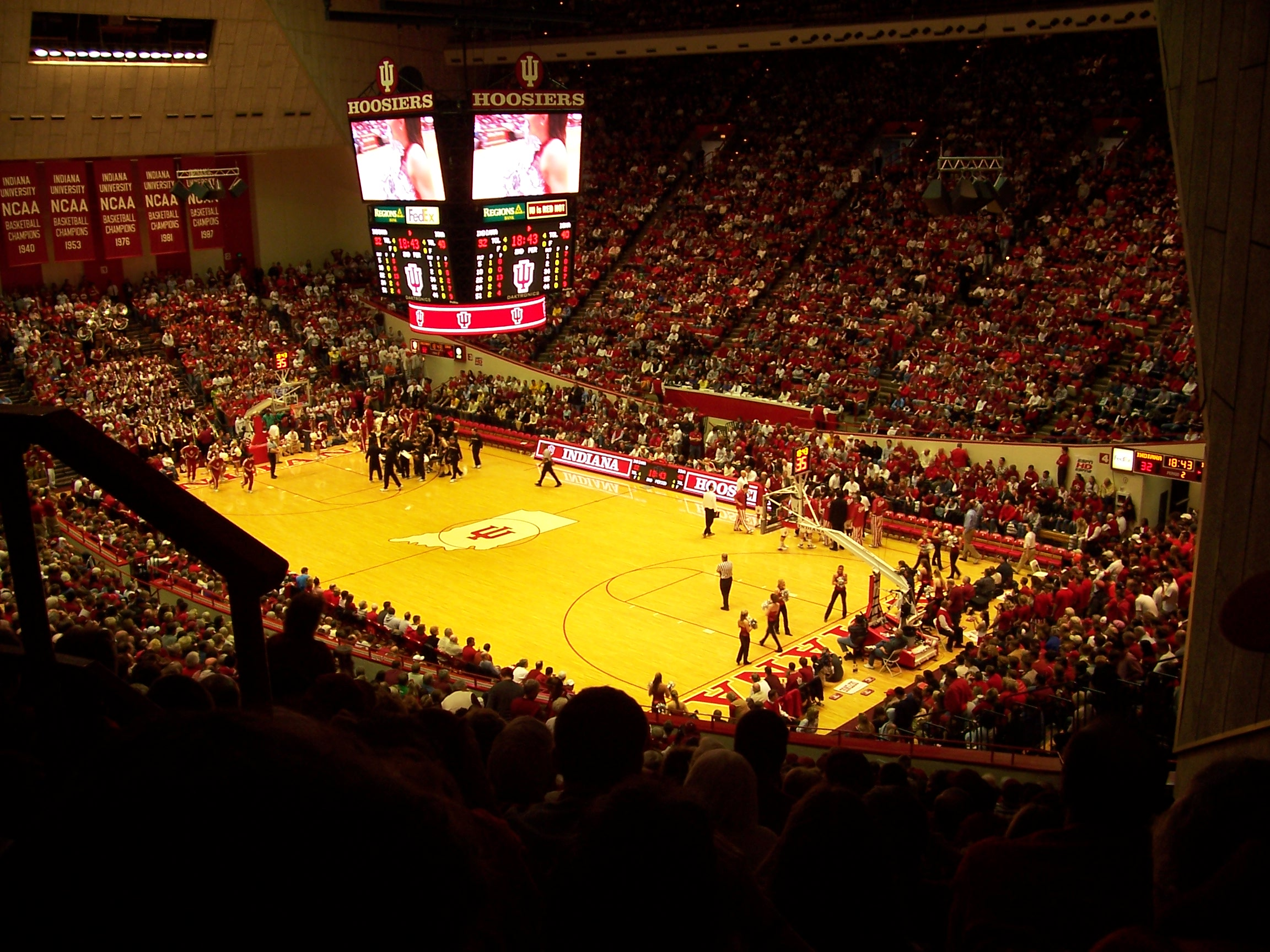
Branch McCracken Court at Simon Skjodt Assembly Hall

The Hoosiers play on Branch McCracken Court at Simon Skjodt Assembly Hall. Indiana has won five NCAA Championships in men's basketball, in 1940, 1953, 1976, 1981, and 1987. Indiana's 1976 team is the last undefeated NCAA men's basketball champion.

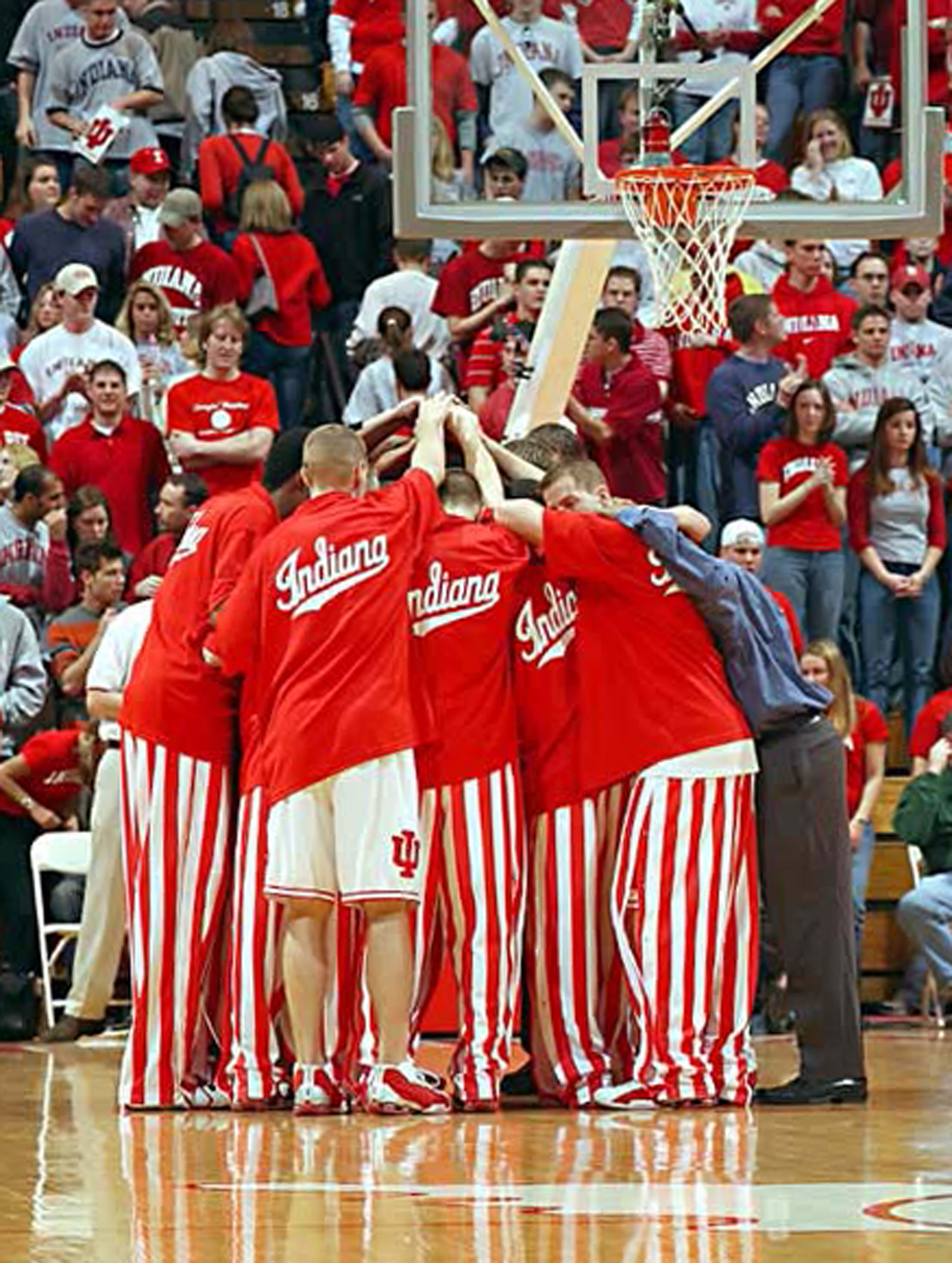
Basketball players huddle before a game in their iconic candy striped pants

A 2012 study listed Indiana as the third most valuable collegiate basketball program in the United States. Indiana has ranked in the top 15 nationally in men's basketball attendance since 1972. Basketball sportscaster Gus Johnson called Assembly Hall "the Carnegie Hall of basketball."

Indiana has rivalries against the Purdue Boilermakers (Indiana–Purdue rivalry) and the Kentucky Wildcats (Indiana–Kentucky rivalry). Darian DeVries was Indiana's head coach in 2025.

==== Women's basketball ====
Women's basketball began at IU began in the 1971–72 season. They were co-Big Ten champions in the 1982–83 season, won the Big Ten Tournament in the 2001–02, and won the WNIT in the 2017–18 season. The current head coach is Teri Moren.

=== Football ===
Indiana began playing football in 1884 and currently plays in the 52,656-seat, open-air Memorial Stadium, built in 1960. Curt Cignetti was hired as Indiana's head football coach beginning in the 2024 season. The team has won the Big Ten Championship three times—in 1945, 1967, and 2025. It has appeared in 16 bowl games, including the Rose Bowl in 1968 and 2025, as well as the 2026 national championship.

- 1968 Rose Bowl: Lost to the University of Southern California 14–3.
- 1979 Holiday Bowl: Defeated Brigham Young University 38–37.
- 1986 All-American Bowl: Lost to Florida State University 27–13.
- 1988 Peach Bowl (January): Lost to the University of Tennessee 27–22.
- 1988 Liberty Bowl: Defeated University of South Carolina 34–10.
- 1990 Peach Bowl: Lost to Auburn University 27–23.
- 1991 Copper Bowl: Defeated Baylor University 24–0.
- 1993 Independence Bowl: Lost to Virginia Tech 45–20.
- 2007 Insight Bowl: Lost to Oklahoma State University 49–33.
- 2015 Pinstripe Bowl: Lost to Duke University 44–41^{OT}
- 2016 Foster Farms Bowl: Lost to University of Utah 26–24.
- 2020 Gator Bowl: Lost to University of Tennessee 23–22.
- 2021 Outback Bowl: Lost to Ole Miss 26–20.
- 2024–25 College Football Playoff first round: Lost to University of Notre Dame 27–17
- 2026 Rose Bowl (2025–26 College Football Playoff quarterfinal): Defeated University of Alabama 38–3.
- 2026 Peach Bowl (2025–26 College Football Playoff semifinal): Defeated University of Oregon 56–22.
- 2026 College Football Playoff National Championship: Defeated University of Miami 27–21.

=== Soccer ===
==== Men's soccer ====
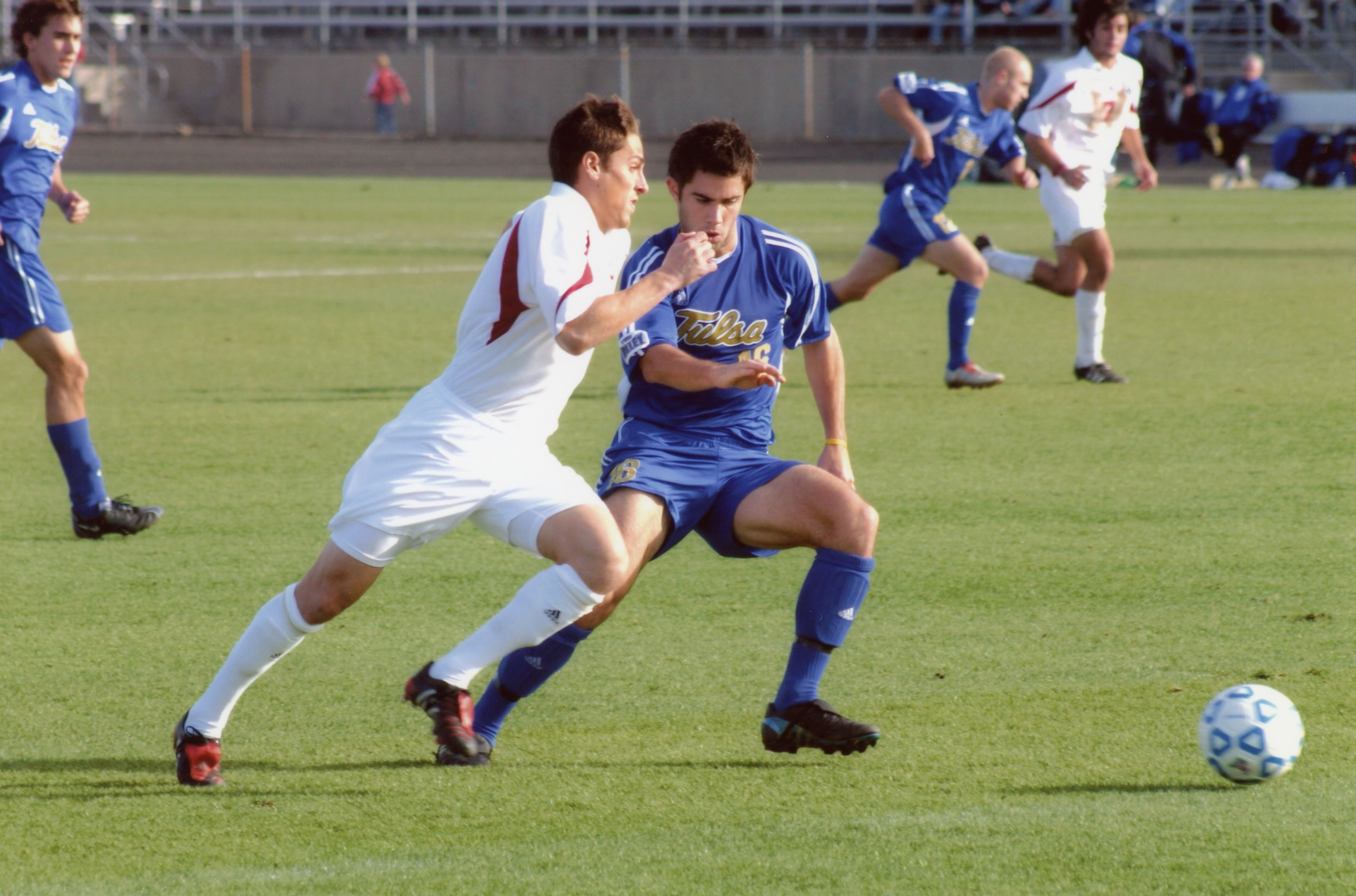
Indiana men's soccer faces the University of Tulsa in 2004

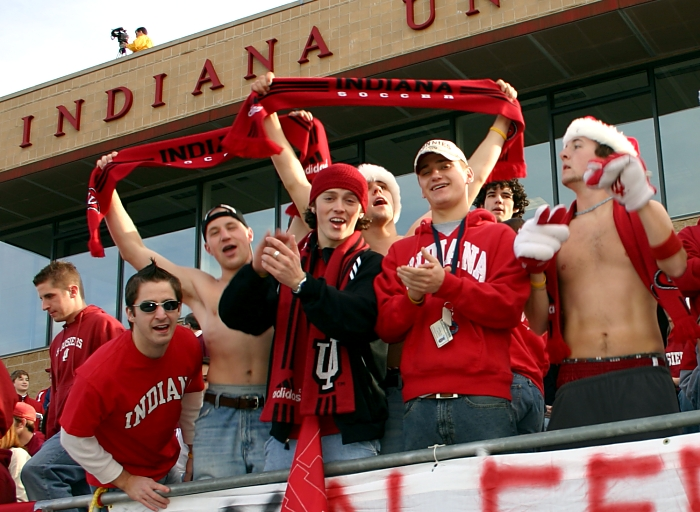
Fans at an IU soccer game at Jerry Yeagley Field at Bill Armstrong Stadium

The Hoosiers have won eight national championships in men's soccer: in 1982, 1983, 1988, 1998, 1999, 2003, 2004 and 2012. Their current coach is Todd Yeagley.

==== Women's soccer ====
On November 18, 2007, the Hoosiers defeated Purdue University in the NCAA second round to advance to the NCAA third round for the first time in program history.

Three Indiana Hoosiers played during the inaugural WUSA season: Wendy Dillinger (Atlanta Beat), Tracy Grose (Carolina Courage), and Kelly Wilson (Bay Area CyberRays).

=== Softball ===
The Hoosier softball team has appeared in four Women's College World Series, in 1979, 1980, 1983 and 1986. The current head coach is Shonda Stanton.

=== Swimming and diving ===
The Hoosiers compete at the 44,651-square-foot (4,148.2 m^{2}) Counsilman-Billingsley Aquatics Center. Under former coaches James Counsilman and Hobie Billingsley, the men's swimming and diving program won 140 consecutive dual meets, 20 consecutive Big Ten titles, and six consecutive NCAA Championships. The women's swimming and diving team has produced four individual national champions, six Big Ten championship teams (in 2003, 2007, 2009, 2010, 2011, and 2019), and fourteen Olympians.

=== Cross country ===
Men's cross country at Bloomington began in 1910. Women's cross country began in 1978.

=== Wrestling ===
Indiana Hoosiers Wrestling began in 1909. They have produced 50 individual All-Americans, 12 individual NCAA national champions from 1932 to 2008, and have won one team NCAA national title (in 1932).

== Club sports ==
The Indiana University Club Sports Federation operates separately from the IU Athletic Department, which means that nearly all of the funding for club sports programs comes through organization dues and outside fundraising. Of the 40 club sports on the Bloomington campus, several are noteworthy for representing IU in high-level national competitions.

=== Men's ice hockey ===
The Indiana University men's ice hockey team was founded in 1967, and has played in the American Collegiate Hockey Association (ACHA) Division II Tri-State Collegiate Hockey League since 2019. In February 2022, the Hoosiers claimed their first TSCHL Playoff Championship, after finishing the regular season as runners-up. The Hoosiers won their first ACHA National Championship in 2024, defeating rival Miami (OH) 5–4 in overtime in St. Louis, MO. Previously, they were members of the Central States Collegiate Hockey League conference, which is part of the ACHA Division I. The team plays most games at the historic Frank Southern Ice Arena off-campus, but some fall practices and games are hosted by the Hamilton Ice Center in Columbus, IN due to seasonal maintenance concerns at "The Frank".

The team holds the 1971 and 2001 Big Ten Hockey League championships, 8 Midwestern Collegiate Hockey League (MCHL) championships during the 1980s and 1990s, and the 2002 Great Midwest Hockey League (GMHL). The Hoosiers men's ice hockey team was the National Championship runner-up in the 1995, 1998, 2000, and 2008 ACHA Division II National Championships, winning their first ACHA D-II national title in 2024. Home and road games are broadcast live on the team's YouTube Channel, although the IU Media School's student-run radio station WIUX (formerly WIUS) broadcast select games prior to 2005. The team is led by Head Coach Andrew Weiss, who took over during the 2021–22 season.

Indiana University also maintains a club hockey team that competes in the Division III Indiana Collegiate Hockey Conference of the ACHA.

=== Men's rugby ===
The IU Men's Rugby Club competes in the Big Ten Universities conference, which is part of D1A Rugby – USA Rugby's elite division of college rugby. The Hoosiers finished the 2016–17 season ranked #7.

The club was founded in 1962 and played its first game against the Notre Dame Rugby Football Club. Head Coach Sarasopa Enari arrived to the program in 1994 and led the team to many notable achievements.

IU reached its first national semifinal in 1998. In 2011 they finished the season ranked 11th. In 2013, IU won the Big Ten Championship match 58–38 over Michigan. In 2015, Indiana defeated Ohio State 34–14 to win another BTU Championship game. Following the conference championship victory, IU achieved a milestone 38–34 win over Kutztown University in the ACRC Bowl Series. This capped a perfect 12-0 Fall 2015 campaign. The Hoosiers finished the season ranked 5th in the country in the D1A rankings. In the 2016-17 IU won another Big Ten Rugby Championship and fell to 4-time national champions BYU in a D1A quarterfinal.

Indiana has also been successful in rugby sevens, particularly in the Collegiate Rugby Championship, a tournament broadcast live by NBC every June from Subaru Park in the Philadelphia metropolitan area. Indiana has competed in the CRC on 4 occasions since 2010. IU finished tied for 5th overall in 2015 after going 3–0 in pool play. The pool play victory over Clemson was the first IU Rugby game played on national television (NBCSN). In 2017 the Hoosiers reached the CRC semifinal before losing to 5-time champions Cal 29–14.

The IU Men's Rugby Club has been hailed as the top "true club rugby team" in the country for its victories over programs who offer scholarships or benefit from their athletic departments, including Kutztown, Life, Davenport, and Notre Dame.

=== Women's rugby ===
The IU Women's Rugby Club was founded in 1996, and has also represented Indiana University at a high level. In 2014, IU reached the national semifinals of the USA Rugby Women's Collegiate Championship.

=== Women's ice hockey ===
Despite having a men's ice hockey team since the late 1960s, the women's team was founded in 2019, and began playing during the 2021–22 season. Their inaugural game was a road trip to the University of Illinois at Urbana-Champaign in February, with a full schedule planned for next season. The team plays their home games at the Frank Southern Ice Arena, south of campus in Bloomington.

=== Men's lacrosse ===
The men's lacrosse team competes in the Men's Collegiate Lacrosse Association (MCLA) Division 1. The Hoosiers are a part of the Upper Midwest Lacrosse Conference (UMLC) and compete with Miami Ohio, Michigan State, Purdue, Western Michigan, Illinois, Iowa State, Minnesota, and Nebraska. The Hoosiers previously competed in the Great Rivers Lacrosse Conference (GRLC), and in 2013 were regular season champions for the GRLC D1 East. They finished the season 11–4 with their final loss of the season in the 2013 GRLC Championship game. In 2014, they finished the season 10-4 and won the GRLC conference championship 14–6 against Illinois State, earning a bid to the MCLA tournament, where they lost 18–5 in the first round to top ranked ASU. In 2018, they finished the season 10-3 and went to the conference championship, beating Purdue 8–5, again earning them a bid to the MCLA tournament, where they lost in the first round 12–6 to first ranked Chapman.

== Rivalries ==
=== Purdue ===
The Purdue Boilermakers are the Hoosiers' biggest rival. The Purdue University's campus in West Lafayette and IU's in Bloomington are the largest in the state of Indiana. Since 1925, the two schools' football teams have competed for the Old Oaken Bucket, with Purdue currently leading the series 70–36–6. In basketball, IU has 22 Big Ten Championships, second only to Purdue's 24. The Boilermakers lead the men's basketball series 115–89. Since the 2001–02 season, IU and Purdue have competed for the Indiana National Guard Governor's Cup. IU leads the series 14–7–2.

=== Kentucky ===
IU also has a heated border rivalry with the Kentucky Wildcats. The annual basketball game between the two often carries national significance as they have combined for 13 national championships. Since 1991, the game has rotated between neutral sites in Indianapolis and Louisville. This neutrality ended during 2006 when the game was played at Rupp Arena in Lexington, Kentucky, with the 2007 game played at Assembly Hall in Bloomington, Indiana. Basketball games between the Hoosiers and Wildcats have at times drawn over 30,000 fans.

=== Illinois ===
After Purdue, one of the Hoosiers' biggest conference rivals are the Illinois Fighting Illini. The rivalry is particularly strong with the Illinois men's basketball team. The all-time series is currently led by Indiana at 96–94, one of the closest series in the Big Ten. The rivalry has lasted through the ages, from Lou Henson and Bob Knight publicly feuding, to Kelvin Sampson and Bruce Weber's heated interaction in recent years.

In football, the rivalry is less intense but notable because of its status as a previously protected rivalry within the Big Ten, the proximity between the schools, and the history of the series dating back to 1899.

=== Michigan State ===
Indiana has a rivalry with the Michigan State Spartans which started in 1950. They battle for the Old Brass Spittoon in football. Michigan State is leading 49–20–2 with Indiana snapping Michigan State's two-year winning streak in 2020.

== Olympic participation ==
Hoosier Mark Spitz won seven swimming gold medals in at the 1972 Munich Summer Olympics. As of the 2016 Summer Olympics, at least 223 athletes and twelve coaches from IU have competed in the Summer Olympics, winning combined 104 medals (55 gold, 17 silver, and 32 bronze).

== Championships ==
=== NCAA team championships ===
Indiana has won 24 NCAA national team titles.

- Men's (24)
  - Basketball (5): 1940, 1953, 1976, 1981, 1987
  - Cross Country (3): 1938, 1940, 1942
  - Outdoor Track & Field (1): 1932
  - Soccer (8): 1982, 1983, 1988, 1998, 1999, 2003, 2004, 2012
  - Swimming (6): 1968, 1969, 1970, 1971, 1972, 1973
  - Wrestling (1): 1932
- See also:
  - List of NCAA schools with the most NCAA Division I championships
  - Big Ten Conference NCAA national team championships

=== Other national team championships ===
These varsity national team championships were not bestowed by the NCAA:

- Men's
  - Football (College Football Playoff): 2025
- Women's
  - Tennis (AIAW): 1982
  - Basketball (WNIT): 2018
- Cheerleading Program (6)
  - Universal Cheerleaders Association National Champions - All Girl Division 1A: 2012, 2013, 2014, 2016, 2017, 2019
- See also:
  - List of Big Ten Conference National Championships
  - List of NCAA schools with the most Division I national championships

=== National individual championships ===
Indiana University has 163 NCAA individual championships.

- Men's Swimming & Diving (90)
- Men's Outdoor Track & Field (24)
- Women's Swimming & Diving (16)
- Men's Indoor Track & Field (12)
- Wrestling (11)
- Men's Cross Country (3)
- Women's Cross Country (2)
- Women's Indoor Track & Field (2)
- Women's Outdoor Track & Field (2)
- Men's Gymnastics (1)

=== Big Ten regular season championships ===
Indiana University has 190 Big Ten regular season championships.

- Men's Swimming & Diving (32): 1961 • 1962 • 1963 • 1964 • 1965 • 1966 • 1967 • 1968 • 1969 • 1970 • 1971 • 1972 • 1973 • 1974 • 1975 • 1976 • 1977 • 1978 • 1979 • 1980 • 1983 • 1984 • 1985 • 2006 • 2017 • 2018 • 2019 • 2022 • 2023 • 2024 • 2025 • 2026
- Men's Basketball (22): 1926(co) • 1928(co) • 1936(co) • 1953 • 1954 • 1957(co) • 1958 • 1967 • 1973 • 1974 • 1975 • 1976 • 1980 • 1981 • 1983 • 1987(co) • 1989 • 1991(co) • 1993 • 2002(co) • 2013 • 2016
- Men's Soccer (20): 1993 • 1994 • 1996 • 1997 • 1998 • 1999 • 2000 • 2001 • 2002 • 2003 • 2004 • 2006 • 2007 • 2010 • 2018 • 2019 • 2021 • 2023(co) • 2024 • 2026
- Men's Indoor Track & Field (18): 1932 • 1933 • 1941 • 1957 • 1973 • 1974 • 1975 • 1979 • 1980 • 1983 • 1984 • 1985 • 1990 • 1991 • 1992 • 2012 • 2017 • 2020
- Men's Cross Country (14): 1928 • 1929 • 1930 • 1931 • 1932 • 1938 • 1940 • 1942 • 1946(co) • 1967 • 1972 • 1973 • 1980(co) • 2013
- Women's Tennis (13): 1982 • 1983 • 1984 • 1987 • 1988 • 1989 • 1990 • 1991 • 1992 • 1993 • 1994 • 1995 • 1998
- Men's Outdoor Track & Field (12): 1936 • 1941 • 1950 • 1957 • 1970 • 1971 • 1973 • 1974 • 1979 • 1985 • 1990 • 1991
- Wrestling (12): 1914 • 1921 • 1924(co) • 1925(co) • 1931 • 1932(co) • 1933 • 1934 • 1936 • 1939 • 1940 • 1943
- Men's Golf (8): 1962 • 1968 • 1970 • 1973 • 1974 • 1975 • 1991 • 1998
- Women's Golf (7): 1986 • 1987 • 1990 • 1992 • 1995 • 1996 • 1998 • 2024
- Baseball (7): 1925 • 1932 • 1938(co) • 1949(co) • 2013 • 2014 • 2019
- Women's Swimming & Diving (6): 2003 • 2007 • 2009 • 2010 • 2011 • 2019 • 2024
- Men's Tennis (5): 1921 • 1952 • 1953 • 1954 • 1964
- Softball (3): 1983 • 1986 • 1994
- Women's Indoor Track & Field (3): 1988 • 1991 • 2000
- Football (3): 1945 • 1967(co) • 2025
- Women's Cross Country (2): 1989 • 1990
- Women's Outdoor Track & Field (2): 2000 • 2001
- Women's Basketball (2): 1983(co) • 2023
- Women's Soccer (1): 1996

=== Big Ten tournament championships ===
Indiana University has 22 Big Ten tournament championships.

- Men's Soccer (16): 1991 • 1992 • 1994 • 1995 (co) • 1996 • 1997 • 1998 • 1999 • 2001 • 2003 • 2006 • 2013 • 2018 • 2019 • 2021 • 2023
- Baseball (4): 1996 • 2009 • 2013 • 2014
- Women's Basketball (1): 2002
- Women's Soccer (1): 1996

=== Other championships ===
Collegiate Water Polo Association Championships (3)

- Water Polo (3): • 2003 • 2011 • 2014

== Notable alumni and former athletes ==
Baseball

- Micah Johnson, MLB player: Chicago White Sox, Los Angeles Dodgers, Atlanta Braves
- Kyle Schwarber, 4th overall pick by Chicago Cubs in 2014 Major League Baseball draft, 2013 and 2014 College Baseball All-America Team selections
- Sam Travis, 2nd-round pick by Boston Red Sox in 2014 Major League Baseball draft
- Ernie Andres, MLB player: Boston Red Sox
- Ralph Brickner, MLB player: Boston Red Sox
- Ted Kluszewski, MLB player: Cincinnati Reds, Pittsburgh Pirates, Chicago White Sox, Los Angeles Angels
- Mickey Morandini, MLB player: Philadelphia Phillies, Chicago Cubs
- Kevin Orie, MLB player: Chicago Cubs, Florida Marlins
- Mike Simon, MLB player: Pittsburgh Pirates, St. Louis Terriers, Brooklyn Tip-Tops
- John Wehner, MLB player: Pittsburgh Pirates
- Kevin Mahar, MLB player: Texas Rangers
- Josh Phegley, MLB player: Chicago White Sox, Oakland Athletics
- Evan Crawford, MLB player: San Francisco Giants
- Jake Dunning, MLB player: San Francisco Giants

Basketball

- Steve Alford, Big Ten MVP, 1987; former University of New Mexico and University of California, Los Angeles men's basketball head coach, currently head coach of the University of Nevada, Olympic Gold Medalist
- Eric Anderson, Big Ten Freshman of the Year, 1989
- OG Anunoby, 2017; NBA Champion, NBA player, Toronto Raptors
- Damon Bailey, Third team All-American, 1994
- Armon Bassett - basketball player with Ironi Ramat Gan of Israel
- Walt Bellamy, Basketball Hall of Fame, 1960 Olympic Gold Medalist, NBA 1st overall pick and Rookie of the Year
- Kent Benson, Final Four MVP, 1976; NBA player: Milwaukee Bucks, Detroit Pistons, Utah Jazz, Cleveland Cavaliers
- Quinn Buckner (current Indiana Pacers TV Analyst); 1976 National Champion, NBA Champion, Olympic Gold Medalist
- Calbert Cheaney, Big Ten MVP, 1993; National Player of the Year, 1993; NBA player: Washington Bullets/Wizards, Boston Celtics, Utah Jazz, Golden State Warriors
- Everett Dean, head baseball and basketball coach at Indiana University
- Steve Downing, Big Ten MVP, 1973
- Jay Edwards, Big Ten Freshman of the Year, 1988; first team All-American, 1989
- Brian Evans, Big Ten MVP, 1996; third team All-American, 1996
- Kevin "Yogi" Ferrell, NBA player: Brooklyn Nets, Dallas Mavericks
- Dane Fife, Michigan State University men's assistant basketball coach
- Lawrence Frank, NBA Head Coach: Detroit Pistons
- Bill Garrett (William Leon Garrett), first African-American player in the Big Ten
- Dean Garrett, Big Ten Newcomer of the Year, 1987
- Eric Gordon, Big Ten Freshman of the Year, 2008; NBA player: Los Angeles Clippers, New Orleans Hornets, Houston Rockets
- Greg Graham, IU guard, 1989–93; former Continental Basketball Association head coach
- A.J. Guyton, Big Ten MVP, 2000; NBA player: Chicago Bulls, Golden State Warriors
- Kirk Haston, NBA player; third team All-American, 2001
- Alan Henderson, NBA player: Atlanta Hawks, Dallas Mavericks, Cleveland Cavaliers, Philadelphia 76ers
- Marvin Huffman, Final Four MVP, 1940
- Jared Jeffries, Big Ten MVP, 2002; NBA player: Washington Wizards, New York Knicks, Portland Trail Blazers
- Ted Kitchel, Third team All-American, 1982
- Bobby Leonard, Basketball Hall of Fame, Second team All-American 1954, coached Indiana Pacers to 3 ABA championships
- Scott May, Big Ten MVP, 1975, 1976; NBA player: Chicago Bulls, Milwaukee Bucks, Detroit Pistons
- Branch McCracken, coach
- George McGinnis, Basketball Hall of Fame, 1975 ABA MVP, 3x NBA all-star, college third team All-American, 1971
- Victor Oladipo, consensus first-team All-American, 2013; NBA player, Orlando Magic, Oklahoma City Thunder, Indiana Pacers
- Don Schlundt, Big Ten MVP, 1953
- Keith Smart, Final Four MVP,1987; NBA Head Coach: Golden State Warriors, Sacramento Kings
- Justin Smith (born 1999), basketball player in the Israeli Basketball Premier League
- Isiah Thomas, Final Four MVP, 1981; Hall of Fame, NBA player: Detroit Pistons, NBA Head Coach: Indiana Pacers, New York Knicks, NBA General Manager: New York Knicks
- Ray Tolbert, Big Ten MVP, 1981
- Tara VanDerveer, Stanford University and 1996 U.S. Olympic women's basketball coach; Naismith and Women's Basketball Halls of Fame
- D. J. White, First Team All Big Ten, 2008, Big Ten Player of the Year, 2008, Big Ten Freshmen of the Year, 2005, Freshmen All-American, 2005; NBA player: Charlotte Bobcats, Boston Celtics
- Randy Wittman, Big Ten MVP, 1983; NBA player and Head Coach: Minnesota Timberwolves
- Mike Woodson, Big Ten MVP, 1980; NBA player and Head Coach: Atlanta Hawks, New York Knicks
- Bracey Wright, NBA player: Minnesota Timberwolves, Israeli Basketball Premier League
- Cody Zeller, consensus second-team All-American, 2013; NBA player, Charlotte Bobcats/Hornets

Football

- Tevin Coleman, NFL player: Atlanta Falcons
- Jordan Howard, NFL player: Philadelphia Eagles
- Victor Adeyanju, NFL player: St. Louis Rams
- Carl Barzilauskas, NFL player: New York Jets, Green Bay Packers
- Nate Borden, NFL player: Dallas Cowboys, Buffalo Bills
- Cam Cameron, IU head coach, NFL Head Coach: Miami Dolphins
- John Cannady, NFL Pro Bowl player: New York Giants
- Z.G. Clevenger, member of College Football Hall of Fame
- Kris Dielman, NFL player: San Diego Chargers
- Vaughn Dunbar, First team All-American, 1991; NFL player: New Orleans Saints, Jacksonville Jaguars
- Frank Filchock, NFL Pro Bowl player
- Marcus Floyd, NFL player: New York Jets, Buffalo Bills, Carolina Panthers
- Trent Green, NFL player: San Diego Chargers, Washington Redskins, St. Louis Rams, Kansas City Chiefs, Miami Dolphins; CFL player: BC Lions
- Aaron Halterman, NFL player: Houston Texans
- James Hardy, NFL player: Buffalo Bills
- Gibran Hamdan, NFL player: Miami Dolphins
- Robert Hoernschemeyer, NFL Pro Bowl player:
- Ben Ishola, NFL player: Miami Dolphins
- Chick Jagade, NFL Pro Bowl player
- Ken Johnson, NFL player: Cincinnati Bengals
- Herana-Daze Jones, NFL player: Cincinnati Bengals, Denver Broncos, New England Patriots
- Cody Latimer, NFL player: Denver Broncos
- Babe Laufenberg, NFL player: New Orleans Saints, San Diego Chargers, Dallas Cowboys
- Chris Liwienski, NFL player: Minnesota Vikings, Arizona Cardinals, Miami Dolphins
- Fernando Mendoza, NFL player: Las Vegas Raiders
- Adewale Ogunleye, NFL player: Chicago Bears
- Pete Pihos, NFL player: Pro Football Hall of Fame
- Tracy Porter, NFL player: New Orleans Saints, Denver Broncos, Oakland Raiders, Washington Redskins, Chicago Bears
- Antwaan Randle El, NFL player: Pittsburgh Steelers, Washington Redskins
- Courtney Roby, NFL player: New Orleans Saints
- Eddie Rucinski, NFL Pro Bowl player
- Lou Saban, AFL coach
- Bob Skoronski, NFL Pro Bowl player: Green Bay Packers
- Rob Spicer, NFL player: N.Y. Jets
- Pete Stoyanovich, NFL player: Miami Dolphins, Kansas City Chiefs, St. Louis Rams
- George Taliaferro, AAFC and NFL player, first African-American selected in the NFL Draft
- Anthony Thompson, Heisman Trophy finalist. NFL player: Phoenix Cardinals
- Willie Townes, NFL player: Dallas Cowboys
- Dave Whitsell, NFL Pro Bowl player
- Sam Wyche, NFL player and coach: Cincinnati Bengals

Golf

- Randy Leen, low amateur, 1996 U.S. Open
- Brad Marek, club pro, made cut at 2021 PGA Championship
- Jeff Overton, PGA Tour player, member of 2010 USA Ryder Cup team
- Shaun Micheel, PGA Tour player, winner of the 2003 PGA Championship

Mixed Martial Arts

- Julie Kedzie, Two-time Hook n' Shoot Tournament Champion, National Karate Champion & fought in first women's MMA match on cable television
- Chris Lytle (Sports Management), retired mixed martial artist

Soccer

- Eric Alexander, MLS player: Portland Timbers
- Kevin Alston, MLS player: New England Revolution
- Mike Ambersley, NASL player: Tampa Bay Rowdies
- Armando Betancourt, European professional player: RC Strasbourg; Honduras National Team
- Mike Clark, MLS player: Columbus Crew
- Angelo DiBernardo, NASL player: New York Cosmos, Los Angeles Aztecs; US Men's National Team
- Wendy Dillinger (WUSA)
- Nick Garcia, MLS player: Kansas City Wizards, San Jose Earthquakes; US Men's National Team
- Ned Grabavoy, MLS player: Los Angeles Galaxy, Columbus Crew, San Jose Earthquakes Real Salt Lake
- Tracy Grose (WUSA)
- Chris Klein, MLS player: Kansas City Wizards, Real Salt Lake, Los Angeles Galaxy; US Men's National Team
- Aleksey Korol, MLS player: Dallas Burn, Chicago Fire
- Dema Kovalenko, MLS player: Chicago Fire, D.C. United, New York Red Bulls, Real Salt Lake, Los Angeles Galaxy
- Yuri Lavrinenko, MLS player: Chicago Fire
- Ryan Mack
- Brian Maisonneuve, MLS player: Columbus Crew; US Men's National Team
- Robert Meschbach
- Drew Moor, MLS player: FC Dallas; US Men's National Team
- Lee Nguyen, MLS player: New England Revolution
- Jay Nolly, MLS player: Real Salt Lake, D.C. United
- Pat Noonan, MLS player: New England Revolution; US Men's National Team
- Danny O'Rourke, Hermann Trophy winner; MLS player: San Jose Earthquakes, New York Red Bulls, Columbus Crew
- Brian Plotkin, MLS player: Chicago Fire
- Jacob Peterson, MLS player: Colorado Rapids
- Matt Reiswerg, Cincinnati Riverhawks, Indiana Blast, 2005 Maccabiah Games
- Ken Snow, Two-time Hermann Trophy winner; US Men's National Team
- Juergen Sommer, Premier League player: Queens Park Rangers; US Men's National Team
- Kelly Wilson (USA)
- Todd Yeagley, MLS player: Columbus Crew
- Jed Zayner, MLS player: Columbus Crew
- Will Bruin, MLS player: Houston Dynamo

Swimming and Diving

- Mark Spitz, 1968 and 1972 Olympic gold medalist swimmer—1971 Sullivan Award
- Lilly King, 2016 Olympic gold medalist
- Cody Miller, 2016 Olympic gold medalist
- Fred Tyler, 1972 Olympic gold medalist swimmer
- John Kinsella, 1968 silver and 1972 Olympic gold medalist swimmer—Sullivan Award winner 1970
- Gary Hall, Sr., 1968, 1972 and 1976 Olympic medalist swimmer
- Lesley Bush, Olympic gold medalist diver
- Jim Montgomery (1976 Olympics/3 Gold Medals 100 free, 2 relays )
- John Murphy (1972 Olympian-gold medalist 400 free relay)
- Charlie Hickcox (1968 Olympian 3 time gold medalist)
- Larry Barbiere (1968 Olympian)
- Mike Troy (1960 Olympian Gold Medalist)
- Mike Stamm (1972 Olympian Gold & Silver medalist)
- Cynthia Potter, Olympian and inductee to International Swimming & Diving Hall of Fame
- Mark Lenzi (1992 Olympian Gold Medalist)
- Don McKenzie (1968 Olympian Gold Medalist)
- Bob Windle (1964 Olympic gold medallist in the 1500 m freestyle for Australia)

Track and field

- Greg Bell, long jumper
- Milt Campbell, decathlete
- Derek Drouin, high jumper (2013 winner of The Bowerman)
- Bob Kennedy, long-distance runner
- Don Lash, long-distance runner
- Molly Ludlow, middle-distance runner
- David Neville, 400 m runner
- Rose Richmond, long jumper
- Dave Volz, pole vaulter
- Aarik Wilson, triple jumper

Wrestling

- Roger Chandler - Wrestling team head coach at Michigan State University
- Joe Dubuque, Two-time NCAA Wrestling champion.
- Angel Escobedo, NCAA Wrestling Champion.
- Dave Herman, 2006 NCAA qualifier; mixed martial artist formerly for the Ultimate Fighting Championship
- Nathan Everhart, Three-time NCAA national qualifier; professional wrestler

Water Polo

- Jessica Gaudreault - Starting goalkeeper of the Canadian Women's Senior National Team who earned a qualifying bid to the Tokyo Olympics.
