= Water polo at the 2023 Pan American Games =

- Water polo pictogram
- Venue: Aquatic Center
- Start date: October 30, 2023
- End date: November 4, 2023
- No. of events: 2 (1 men, 1 women)
- Competitors: 192 from 8 nations

Water polo competitions at the 2023 Pan American Games was held from October 30 to November 4. The venue for the competition was the Aquatic Center, in Santiago, Chile. A total of eight men's and eight women's teams (each consisting of up to 12 athletes) competed in each tournament. This means a total of 192 athletes competed.

The top team in each tournament not already qualified for the 2024 Summer Olympics will qualify for the said event.

== Qualification ==
A total of eight men's teams and eight women's team will qualify to compete at the games in each tournament. The host nation (Chile) qualified in each tournament, along with seven other teams in each tournament according to various criteria. Canada and the United States automatically qualified in each tournament, along with the top two teams at the 2022 South American Games and the top three teams at the 2023 Central American and Caribbean Games.

=== Summary ===
Nation	Men's	Women's	Athletes
Argentina	Yes	Yes	24
Brazil	Yes	Yes	24
Canada	Yes	Yes	24
Chile	Yes	Yes	24
Cuba	Yes	Yes	24
Mexico	Yes	Yes	24
Puerto Rico	Yes	Yes	24
United States	Yes	Yes	24
Total: 8 NOCs	8	8	192

=== Men ===
Event	Dates	Location	Quota(s)	Qualified team
Host nation	—N/a		1	Chile
Zone 3 (automatic qualification)	—N/a		1	United States
Zone 4 (automatic qualification)	—N/a		1	Canada
2022 South American Games	October 11–15	(Paraguay) Asunción	2	Brazil; Argentina
2023 Central American and Caribbean Games	July 1–8	(El Salvador) San Salvador	3	Puerto Rico; Cuba; Mexico
Total			8	

=== Women ===
Event	Dates	Location	Quota(s)	Qualified
Host nation	—N/a		1	Chile
Zone 3 (automatic qualification)	—N/a		1	United States
Zone 4 (automatic qualification)	—N/a		1	Canada
2022 CCCAN Championships*	July 20–26	(Barbados) Bridgetown	3	Cuba; Mexico; Puerto Rico
2022 South American Games	October 11–15	(Paraguay) Asunción	2	Brazil; Argentina
Total			8	

- The 2023 Central American and Caribbean Games were scheduled to be the qualifying tournament for the CCCAN, but the tournament was cancelled due to low entries. Due to this, the 2022 CCCAN Championships were used to determine the qualifying teams.

== Participating nations ==
A total of eight countries qualified water polo teams, with each country qualifying both a men's and women's. Some teams used their alternate athletes in matches and are not counted in the total.

- Argentina (24)
- Brazil (24)
- Canada (24)
- Chile (24)
- Cuba (24)
- Mexico (24)
- Puerto Rico (24)
- United States (24)

== Medal summary ==
=== Medal table ===
Rank	Nation	Gold	Silver	Bronze	Total
1	United States	2	0	0	2
2	Brazil	0	1	1	2
3	Canada	0	1	0	1
4	Argentina	0	0	1	1
Totals (4 entries)		2	2	2	6

=== Medalists ===
Event	Gold	Silver	Bronze
Men's tournament	United States; Alexander Bowen; Luca Cupido; Hannes Daube; Chase Dodd; Ryder Dodd; Benjamin Hallock; Drew Holland; Johnathan Hooper; Maxwell Irving; Alexander Obert; Adrian Weinberg; Dylan Woodhead; Quinn Woodhead	Brazil; Guilherme Barella; Logan Cabral; Alípio Nardaci; Gustavo Coutinho; Roberto de Freitas; Bruno Chiappini; Rafael Real; Pedro Real; Marcos Vinicius Pires; Gabriel Sojo da Silva; Gustavo Guimarães; Luis Ricardo da Silva; Alexandre Mendes	Argentina; Diego Malnero; Ramiro Veich; Tomás Galimberti; Tomás Tilatti; Nahuel Leona; Tomás Echenique; Iván Carabantes; Eduardo Bonomo; Carlos Camnasio; Esteban Corsi; Guido Poggi; Teo Soler; Octavio Salas
Women's tournament	United States; Ashleigh Johnson; Emily Ausmus; Tara Prentice; Rachel Fattal; Jenna Flynn; Maggie Steffens; Jordan Raney; Ryann Neushul; Jewel Roemer; Kaleigh Gilchrist; Ava Johnson; Bayley Weber; Amanda Longan	Canada; Jessica Gaudreault; Rae Lekness; Axelle Crevier; Emma Wright; Daphné Guèvremont; Blaire McDowell; Verica Bakoc; Elyse Lemay-Lavoie; Hayley McKelvey; Serena Browne; Kindred Paul; Floranne Carroll; Clara Vulpisi	Brazil; Thatiana Pregolini; Stefany Azevedo; Letícia Silva; Kemily Leão; Ana Júlia Amaral; Jeniffer Cavalcante; Samantha Ferreira; Karen da Silva; Letícia Belorio; Rebecca Moreira; Luana de Souza; Eduarda Estevão; Isabela Mendes

== See also ==
- Water polo at the 2024 Summer Olympics
