= Water polo at the 2022 South American Games – Women's tournament =

11-15 October 2022 in Asunción, Paraguay

2022 South American Games women's water polo tournament
Tournament details
- Country: Paraguay
- City: Asunción
- Venue: Centro Acuático Nacional
- Dates: 11–15 October 2022
- Teams: 7 (from 1 confederation)

Final positions
- Champions: BRA (2nd title)
- Runners-up: ARG
- Third place: PER
- Fourth place: VEN

Tournament statistics
- Matches played: 14
- Goals scored: 401 (28.64 per match)
- Top scorers: (Venezuela) Samantha Torres (Colombia) María Restrepo (16 goals each)

Official website
- Tournament website

The women's tournament of the water polo at the 2022 South American Games was held from 11 to 15 October 2022 at the Centro Acuático Nacional in Asunción, Paraguay. It was the second edition of the water polo women's tournament at the South American Games since its first appearance in Medellín 2010 (it was not held in Santiago 2014 and ended being cancelled in Cochabamba 2018).

The tournament served as qualifier for the 2023 Pan American Games, with the top two teams qualifying to the women's water polo tournament.

Defending champions Brazil won the gold medal and their second South American Games women's water polo title after beating Argentina by a 14–8 score in the final. Both teams, Brazil and Argentina, qualified for the 2023 Pan American Games as the CONSANAT representatives, besides Chile who qualified automatically as hosts.

Peru beat Venezuela 18–17 (4–3 on penalties) to win the bronze medal.

== Schedule ==
The tournament was held over a 5-day period, from 11 to 15 October.

| GS | Group stage | SF | Semi-finals | B | Bronze-medal match | F | Gold-medal match |

| Tue 11 | Wed 12 | Thu 13 | Fri 14 | Sat 15 | |
|---|---|---|---|---|---|
| GS | GS | GS | SF | B | F |
| 6 M | 3 M | 6 M | 3 M | 2 M | |

== Teams ==
A total of seven ODESUR NOCs entered teams for the women's tournament.

| Teams | App | Previous best performance |
|---|---|---|
| Argentina | 2nd | Bronze medal (2010) |
| Brazil | 2nd | Gold medal (2010) |
| Chile | 1st | Debut |
| Colombia | 2nd | Fourth place (2010) |
| Paraguay | 1st | Debut |
| Peru | 1st | Debut |
| Venezuela | 2nd | Silver medal (2010) |

=== Rosters ===
Each participating NOC had to enter a roster of 13 players, including at least 2 goalkeepers (Technical manual Article 10.2).

== Results ==
All match times are in PYST (UTC−3).

=== Group stage ===
The group stage consisted of two groups; one of three teams and another of four teams. Each group was played under the round-robin format with the top two teams of each group progressing to the semi-finals and the third placed team of each group advancing to the fifth place match.

==== Group A ====
| Pos | Team | Pld | W | D | L | GF | GA | GD | Pts | Qualification |
|---|---|---|---|---|---|---|---|---|---|---|
| 1 | Brazil | 2 | 2 | 0 | 0 | 47 | 4 | +43 | 4 | Semi-finals |
| 2 | Peru | 2 | 1 | 0 | 1 | 12 | 25 | −13 | 2 | Semi-finals |
| 3 | Chile | 2 | 0 | 0 | 2 | 8 | 38 | −30 | 0 | Fifth place match |

Source: ASU2022
Rules for classification: 1) points; 2) head-to-head points; 3) head-to-head goal difference; 4) head-to-head number of goals scored; 5) goal difference.

| 11 October 2022; 16:10 | Report | Brazil | 28–2 | Chile | Centro Acuático Nacional; Referees: Di Biasio, Queipo |
| 11 October 2022; 16:10 | Report | Score by quarters: 5–0, 8–0, 8–0, 7–2 | | | Centro Acuático Nacional; Referees: Di Biasio, Queipo |
| 11 October 2022; 16:10 | Report | Ferreira 5 | Goals | Beltrán, Ravizza 1 | Centro Acuático Nacional; Referees: Di Biasio, Queipo |

| 12 October 2022; 11:40 | Report | Brazil | 19–2 | Peru | Centro Acuático Nacional; Referees: Perré, García |
| 12 October 2022; 11:40 | Report | Score by quarters: 7–0, 6–2, 3–0, 3–0 | | | Centro Acuático Nacional; Referees: Perré, García |
| 12 October 2022; 11:40 | Report | Ferreira 6 | Goals | Rolando, Rodríguez 1 | Centro Acuático Nacional; Referees: Perré, García |

| 13 October 2022; 16:10 | Report | Peru | 10–6 | Chile | Centro Acuático Nacional; Referees: Daners, Monteiro |
| 13 October 2022; 16:10 | Report | Score by quarters: 2–1, 1–2, 6–1, 1–2 | | | Centro Acuático Nacional; Referees: Daners, Monteiro |
| 13 October 2022; 16:10 | Report | Sirio 3 | Goals | Sarmiento 5 | Centro Acuático Nacional; Referees: Daners, Monteiro |

==== Group B ====
| Pos | Team | Pld | W | D | L | GF | GA | GD | Pts | Qualification |
|---|---|---|---|---|---|---|---|---|---|---|
| 1 | Argentina | 3 | 3 | 0 | 0 | 73 | 21 | +52 | 6 | Semi-finals |
| 2 | Venezuela | 3 | 1 | 1 | 1 | 47 | 33 | +14 | 3 | Semi-finals |
| 3 | Colombia | 3 | 1 | 1 | 1 | 62 | 33 | +29 | 3 | Fifth place match |
| 4 | Paraguay | 3 | 0 | 0 | 3 | 21 | 116 | −95 | 0 | |

Source: ASU2022
Rules for classification: 1) points; 2) head-to-head points; 3) head-to-head goal difference; 4) head-to-head number of goals scored; 5) goal difference.

| 11 October 2022; 13:30 | Report | Colombia | 10–11 | Venezuela | Centro Acuático Nacional; Referees: Monteiro, Teixido |
| 11 October 2022; 13:30 | Report | Score by quarters: 5–2, 0–1, 3–5, 2–3 | | | Centro Acuático Nacional; Referees: Monteiro, Teixido |
| 11 October 2022; 13:30 | Report | Restrepo 4 | Goals | Torres, Carangelo 4 | Centro Acuático Nacional; Referees: Monteiro, Teixido |

| 11 October 2022; 14:50 | Report | Argentina | 44–5 | Paraguay | Centro Acuático Nacional; Referees: Villanueva, Alejos |
| 11 October 2022; 14:50 | Report | Score by quarters: 12–0, 9–3, 12–0, 11–2 | | | Centro Acuático Nacional; Referees: Villanueva, Alejos |
| 11 October 2022; 14:50 | Report | Bacigalupo 7 | Goals | Salcedo 4 | Centro Acuático Nacional; Referees: Villanueva, Alejos |

| 12 October 2022; 9:00 | Report | Colombia | 42–6 | Paraguay | Centro Acuático Nacional; Referees: Fernandes, Queipo |
| 12 October 2022; 9:00 | Report | Score by quarters: 11–0, 8–1, 9–2, 14–2 | | | Centro Acuático Nacional; Referees: Fernandes, Queipo |
| 12 October 2022; 9:00 | Report | Restrepo 11 | Goals | Salcedo 3 | Centro Acuático Nacional; Referees: Fernandes, Queipo |

| 12 October 2022; 10:20 | Report | Argentina | 13–6 | Venezuela | Centro Acuático Nacional; Referees: Monteiro, Villanueva |
| 12 October 2022; 10:20 | Report | Score by quarters: 4–1, 4–2, 4–0, 1–3 | | | Centro Acuático Nacional; Referees: Monteiro, Villanueva |
| 12 October 2022; 10:20 | Report | Leonard 5 | Goals | Carangelo 3 | Centro Acuático Nacional; Referees: Monteiro, Villanueva |

| 13 October 2022; 13:30 | Report | Colombia | 10–16 | Argentina | Centro Acuático Nacional; Referees: Teixido, Fernandes |
| 13 October 2022; 13:30 | Report | Score by quarters: 3–3, 3–3, 1–4, 3–6 | | | Centro Acuático Nacional; Referees: Teixido, Fernandes |
| 13 October 2022; 13:30 | Report | Vanegas 4 | Goals | Leonard 5 | Centro Acuático Nacional; Referees: Teixido, Fernandes |

| 13 October 2022; 14:50 | Report | Paraguay | 10–30 | Venezuela | Centro Acuático Nacional; Referees: Alfaro, Carlos Paipilla (COL) |
| 13 October 2022; 14:50 | Report | Score by quarters: 2–6, 2–7, 3–10, 3–7 | | | Centro Acuático Nacional; Referees: Alfaro, Carlos Paipilla (COL) |
| 13 October 2022; 14:50 | Report | Salcedo 5 | Goals | Torres 11 | Centro Acuático Nacional; Referees: Alfaro, Carlos Paipilla (COL) |

=== Knockout stage ===
The knockout stage consisted of the fifth place match (between the third placed team of each group in the group stage), the semi-finals and the bronze and gold-medal matches. The semi-finals match-ups were:

- Semifinal 1: Group A winners v Group B runners-up
- Semifinal 2: Group B winners v Group A runners-up

Winners of semi-finals played the gold-medal match, while losers played the bronze-medal match.

Semi-finals
14 October
Brazil | 16
Venezuela | 3
14 October
Argentina | 16
Peru | 12

Gold-medal match
15 October
Brazil | 14
Argentina | 8
Bronze-medal match
15 October
Venezuela | 14 (3)
Peru (pso) | 14 (4)

| Fifth place match |
| 14 October |
| Colombia | 21 |
| Chile | 6 |

==== Semifinals ====
| 14 October 2022; 10:20 | Report | Brazil | 16–3 | Venezuela | Centro Acuático Nacional |
| 14 October 2022; 10:20 | Report | Score by quarters: 5–0, 5–2, 4–1, 2–0 | | | Centro Acuático Nacional |
| 14 October 2022; 10:20 | Report | Dias, Belorio 5 | Goals | Agelvis 2 | Centro Acuático Nacional |

| 14 October 2022; 11:40 | Report | Argentina | 16–12 | Peru | Centro Acuático Nacional; Referees: Teixido, García |
| 14 October 2022; 11:40 | Report | Score by quarters: 4–3, 4–1, 5–4, 3–4 | | | Centro Acuático Nacional; Referees: Teixido, García |
| 14 October 2022; 11:40 | Report | Bacigalupo 4 | Goals | A. López 9 | Centro Acuático Nacional; Referees: Teixido, García |

==== Fifth place match ====
| 14 October 2022; 9:00 | Report | Colombia | 21–6 | Chile | Centro Acuático Nacional; Referees: Fernandes, Alejos |
| 14 October 2022; 9:00 | Report | Score by quarters: 7–0, 5–2, 4–1, 5–3 | | | Centro Acuático Nacional; Referees: Fernandes, Alejos |
| 14 October 2022; 9:00 | Report | Restrepo 5 | Goals | Kiara Henríquez 3 | Centro Acuático Nacional; Referees: Fernandes, Alejos |

==== Bronze-medal match ====
| 15 October 2022; 8:00 | Report | Venezuela | 17–18 (PSO) | Peru | Centro Acuático Nacional; Referees: Fernandes, Di Biasio |
| 15 October 2022; 8:00 | Report | Score by quarters: 4–2, 2–2, 5–7, 3–3 PSO: 3–4 | | | Centro Acuático Nacional; Referees: Fernandes, Di Biasio |
| 15 October 2022; 8:00 | Report | Carangelo 5 | Goals | A. López 5 | Centro Acuático Nacional; Referees: Fernandes, Di Biasio |

==== Gold-medal match ====
| 15 October 2022; 9:20 | Report | Brazil | 14–8 | Argentina | Centro Acuático Nacional; Referees: Fernandes, Di Biasio |
| 15 October 2022; 9:20 | Report | Score by quarters: 5–2, 3–2, 3–2, 3–2 | | | Centro Acuático Nacional; Referees: Fernandes, Di Biasio |
| 15 October 2022; 9:20 | Report | Belorio 4 | Goals | three players 2 | Centro Acuático Nacional; Referees: Fernandes, Di Biasio |

== Final ranking ==
| Rank | Team |
|---|---|
| 1st place, gold medalist(s) | Brazil |
| 2nd place, silver medalist(s) | Argentina |
| 3rd place, bronze medalist(s) | Peru |
| 4 | Venezuela |
| 5 | Colombia |
| 6 | Chile |
| 7 | Paraguay |

2022 Women's South American Water Polo Champions

Brazil
First title

Team roster: Thatiana Pregolini, Diana Abla, Luana Bonetti, Kemily Leão, Luana Ribeiro Quinn, Marcela Marrani Marques, Samantha Ferreira, Jeniffer Cavalcante, Melani Palaro Dias, Rebecca Da Silva Moreira, Mirella Coutinho, Letícia Belorio, Isabela Rodrigues de Souza
Head coach: Frank Almora

== Medalists ==
| Gold | Silver | Bronze |
| Brazil Thatiana Pregolini (GK); Diana Abla; Luana Bonetti; Kemily Leão; Luana Ribeiro Quinn; Marcela Marrani Marques; Samantha Ferreira; Jeniffer Cavalcante; Melani Palaro Dias; Rebecca Da Silva Moreira; Mirella Coutinho; Letícia Belorio; Isabela Rodrigues de Souza (GK) Head coach: Frank Almora | Argentina Nahir Stegmayer (GK); Victoria Ruiz; Cecilia Marie; Ashley Hatcher; Ludmila Ianni; Maitena Romano; Julieta Auliel; Celeste Comba; Isabel Riley; Ana Agnesina; Anahí Bacigalupo; María Sol Canda; Lola Canales (GK) Head coach: Guillermo Luis Setti | Peru Milagros López (GK); Miranda Nieto; Diana Garnica; Daniela Torres; Belén Torres; Abigail Sirio; Areli Rolando; Carolina Rodríguez; Grecia Nolasco; Anna López; Rebeca Rodríguez; Elisa López; Grecia Bojorquez (GK) Head coach: José Antonio Luque |

== Qualified teams for Pan American Games ==
The following three teams from CONSANAT qualified for the 2023 Pan American Games women's water polo tournament, including Chile which qualified as hosts.

| Team | Qualified on | Previous appearances in Pan American Games^{1} |
|---|---|---|
| Chile | 4 November 2017 | 1 (1951) |
| Brazil | 14 October 2022 | 6 (all) (1999, 2003, 2007, 2011, 2015, 2019) |
| Argentina | 14 October 2022 | 2 (2011, 2015) |

^{1} Bold indicates champions for that year. Italic indicates hosts for that year.
