= ICHC =

ICHC may refer to:

- I Can Has Cheezburger?, a blog-format website featuring videos and image macros
- Independent Community and Health Concern, a political party based in Kidderminster, United Kingdom
- Indiana Collegiate Hockey Conference, within Division 3 of the American Collegiate Hockey Association
