= Water polo at the 2023 Pan American Games – Women's tournament =

Women's water polo tournament at the 2023 Pan American Games
- Venue: Aquatic Center
- Dates: October 30 – November 4
- Competitors: 96 from 8 nations

Medalists
Gold medal	United States
Silver medal	Canada
Bronze medal	Brazil

The women's tournament of water polo at the 2023 Pan American Games in Santiago, Chile took place between October 30 and November 4 at the Aquatic Center in Santiago. The winner of the competition, the United States, qualified directly for the 2024 Summer Olympics in Paris, France.

== Schedule ==
The schedule is as follows.

Legend
G	Group stage	¼	Quarter-finals	½	Semi-finals	B	Bronze medal match	F	Gold medal match

Mon 30	Tue 31	Wed 1	Thu 2	Fri 3	Sat 4	
G	G	G	¼	½	B	F

== Qualification ==
A total of eight women's teams qualified to compete at the games. The host nation (Chile) qualified automatically, along with seven other teams in each tournament according to various criteria. Canada and the United States automatically qualified in each tournament, along with the top three teams at the 2022 CCCAN Championships and top two teams at the 2022 South American Games.

Event	Dates	Location	Quota(s)	Qualified
Host nation	—		1	Chile
Zone 3 (automatic qualification)	—		1	United States
Zone 4 (automatic qualification)	—		1	Canada
2022 CCCAN Championships*	July 20–26	(Barbados) Bridgetown	3	Cuba; Mexico; Puerto Rico
2022 South American Games	October 11–15	(Paraguay) Asunción	2	Brazil; Argentina
Total			8	

- The 2023 Central American and Caribbean Games were scheduled to be the qualifying tournament for the CCCAN, but the tournament was cancelled due to low entries. Due to this, the 2022 CCCAN Championships were used to determine the qualifying teams.

== Format ==
Teams are split into 2 round-robin groups of 4 teams each, where the final positions in each group will determine seedings for the knockout stage. The losing teams from the quarterfinals stage will compete in a separate single elimination bracket to determine fifth through eighth places in the final rankings.

== Preliminary round ==
All times are local (UTC−3).

=== Group A ===
Pos	Team	Pld	W	PSW	PSL	L	GF	GA	GD	Pts	Qualification
1	Canada	3	3	0	0	0	70	19	+51	9	Quarterfinals
2	Argentina	3	1	1	0	1	35	37	−2	5	Quarterfinals
3	Cuba	3	1	0	1	1	34	53	−19	4	Quarterfinals
4	Mexico	3	0	0	0	3	24	54	−30	0	Quarterfinals

Source: Santiago 2023
Rules for classification: 1) points; 2) head-to-head points; 3) head-to-head goal difference; 4) head-to-head number of goals scored; 5) goal difference.

30 October 2023; 8:00	Report	Mexico	11–14	Cuba	Aquatic Center, Santiago; Referees: Danielle Dabbaghian (USA); Frank Ohme (GER)
30 October 2023; 8:00	Report	Score by quarters: 3–3, 3–4, 4–4, 1–3			Aquatic Center, Santiago; Referees: Danielle Dabbaghian (USA); Frank Ohme (GER)

30 October 2023; 11:00	Report	Canada	14–9	Argentina	Aquatic Center, Santiago; Referees: Jose Garcia Soto (VEN); Reynel Castillo (USA)
30 October 2023; 11:00	Report	Score by quarters: 3–2, 6–1, 1–4, 4–2			Aquatic Center, Santiago; Referees: Jose Garcia Soto (VEN); Reynel Castillo (USA)
30 October 2023; 11:00	Report	Bakoc 4	Goals	Auliel, A. Bacigalupo 3	Aquatic Center, Santiago; Referees: Jose Garcia Soto (VEN); Reynel Castillo (USA)

31 October 2023; 8:00	Report	Canada	24–3	Cuba	Aquatic Center, Santiago; Referees: Harvey Hinds (CUW); Darren Spritosanto (USA)
31 October 2023; 8:00	Report	Score by quarters: 6–0, 7–0, 2–0, 9–3			Aquatic Center, Santiago; Referees: Harvey Hinds (CUW); Darren Spritosanto (USA)
31 October 2023; 8:00	Report	three players 4	Goals	three players 1	Aquatic Center, Santiago; Referees: Harvey Hinds (CUW); Darren Spritosanto (USA)

31 October 2023; 11:00	Report	Mexico	6–8	Argentina	Aquatic Center, Santiago; Referees: Yuri Machado (BRA); David Gomez Pordomingo (ESP)
31 October 2023; 11:00	Report	Score by quarters: 0–0, 0–4, 5–3, 1–1			Aquatic Center, Santiago; Referees: Yuri Machado (BRA); David Gomez Pordomingo (ESP)
31 October 2023; 11:00	Report	Guzmán 3	Goals	Auliel, Leonard 2	Aquatic Center, Santiago; Referees: Yuri Machado (BRA); David Gomez Pordomingo (ESP)

1 November 2023; 8:00	Report	Mexico	7–32	Canada	Aquatic Center, Santiago; Referees: Fernando Teodoro de Brito (BRA); Daniel Federico Daners (URU)
1 November 2023; 8:00	Report	Score by quarters: 2–7, 3–8, 1–8, 1–9			Aquatic Center, Santiago; Referees: Fernando Teodoro de Brito (BRA); Daniel Federico Daners (URU)
1 November 2023; 8:00	Report	Ramírez 3	Goals	Browne 5	Aquatic Center, Santiago; Referees: Fernando Teodoro de Brito (BRA); Daniel Federico Daners (URU)

1 November 2023; 11:00	Report	Cuba	17–18 (PSO)	Argentina	Aquatic Center, Santiago; Referees: Danielle Dabbaghian (USA); Reynel Castillo (PUR)
1 November 2023; 11:00	Report	Score by quarters: 5–2, 3–3, 3–3, 1–4 PSO: 5–6			Aquatic Center, Santiago; Referees: Danielle Dabbaghian (USA); Reynel Castillo (PUR)
1 November 2023; 11:00	Report	Zunzunegui 4	Goals	A. Bacigalupo 6	Aquatic Center, Santiago; Referees: Danielle Dabbaghian (USA); Reynel Castillo (PUR)

=== Group B ===
Pos	Team	Pld	W	PSW	PSL	L	GF	GA	GD	Pts	Qualification
1	United States	3	3	0	0	0	89	3	+86	9	Quarterfinals
2	Brazil	3	2	0	0	1	53	34	+19	6	Quarterfinals
3	Puerto Rico	3	1	0	0	2	21	60	−39	3	Quarterfinals
4	Chile (H)	3	0	0	0	3	14	80	−66	0	Quarterfinals

Source: Santiago 2023
Rules for classification: 1) points; 2) head-to-head points; 3) head-to-head goal difference; 4) head-to-head number of goals scored; 5) goal difference.
(H) Host

30 October 2023; 9:30	Report	Brazil	19–7	Puerto Rico	Aquatic Center, Santiago; Referees: German Moller (ARG); Wilhem Keman (NED)
30 October 2023; 9:30	Report	Score by quarters: 4–3, 6–2, 6–1, 3–1			Aquatic Center, Santiago; Referees: German Moller (ARG); Wilhem Keman (NED)
30 October 2023; 9:30	Report	Leão 4	Goals	Montalvo, Melendez 2	Aquatic Center, Santiago; Referees: German Moller (ARG); Wilhem Keman (NED)

30 October 2023; 12:30	Report	United States	35–0	Chile	Aquatic Center, Santiago; Referees: Jorge Rincon Patiño (COL); Ernesto Hernández Toledo (CUB)
30 October 2023; 12:30	Report	Score by quarters: 12–0, 8–0, 8–0, 7–0			Aquatic Center, Santiago; Referees: Jorge Rincon Patiño (COL); Ernesto Hernández Toledo (CUB)
30 October 2023; 12:30	Report	Flynn, Steffens 5	Goals		Aquatic Center, Santiago; Referees: Jorge Rincon Patiño (COL); Ernesto Hernández Toledo (CUB)

31 October 2023; 9:30	Report	United States	29–0	Puerto Rico	Aquatic Center, Santiago; Referees: Hélène Painchaud (CAN); Xavier Villanueva (CHI)
31 October 2023; 9:30	Report	Score by quarters: 8–0, 8–0, 7–0, 6–0			Aquatic Center, Santiago; Referees: Hélène Painchaud (CAN); Xavier Villanueva (CHI)
31 October 2023; 9:30	Report	Steffens 6	Goals		Aquatic Center, Santiago; Referees: Hélène Painchaud (CAN); Xavier Villanueva (CHI)

31 October 2023; 12:30	Report	Brazil	31–2	Chile	Aquatic Center, Santiago; Referees: Mikhail Dykman (CAN); Agustin Pinski (ARG)
31 October 2023; 12:30	Report	Score by quarters: 10–0, 10–0, 3–2, 8–0			Aquatic Center, Santiago; Referees: Mikhail Dykman (CAN); Agustin Pinski (ARG)
31 October 2023; 12:30	Report	Leão 6	Goals	Puelma, Ravizza 1	Aquatic Center, Santiago; Referees: Mikhail Dykman (CAN); Agustin Pinski (ARG)

1 November 2023; 9:30	Report	Brazil	3–25	United States	Aquatic Center, Santiago; Referees: Gerardo Arellano Jr (MEX); Hélène Painchaud (CAN)
1 November 2023; 9:30	Report	Score by quarters: 1–4, 0–9, 0–4, 2–8			Aquatic Center, Santiago; Referees: Gerardo Arellano Jr (MEX); Hélène Painchaud (CAN)
1 November 2023; 9:30	Report	Belorio 2	Goals	Fattal 5	Aquatic Center, Santiago; Referees: Gerardo Arellano Jr (MEX); Hélène Painchaud (CAN)

1 November 2023; 12:30	Report	Puerto Rico	14–12	Chile	Aquatic Center, Santiago; Referees: Ernesto Hernández Toledo (CUB); Jorge Pinski (ARG)
1 November 2023; 12:30	Report	Score by quarters: 4–4, 3–2, 4–4, 3–2			Aquatic Center, Santiago; Referees: Ernesto Hernández Toledo (CUB); Jorge Pinski (ARG)
1 November 2023; 12:30	Report	Guzmán 4	Goals	Sarmiento 4	Aquatic Center, Santiago; Referees: Ernesto Hernández Toledo (CUB); Jorge Pinski (ARG)

== Final stage ==
=== Bracket ===
Quarterfinals
2 November
Argentina	13
Puerto Rico	11
2 November
Mexico	1
United States	32
2 November
Cuba	10
Brazil	12
2 November
Canada	33
Chile	2

Semifinals
3 November
Argentina	1
United States	27
3 November
Brazil	4
Canada	21

Gold medal match
4 November
United States	20
Canada	11
Bronze medal match
4 November
Argentina	9
Brazil	10

5–8th place semifinals
3 November
Puerto Rico	9
Mexico	10
3 November
Cuba	15
Chile	13

Fifth place
4 November
Mexico	15
Cuba	11
Seventh place
4 November
Puerto Rico	18
Chile	13

=== Quarterfinals ===
2 November 2023; 8:00	Report	Argentina	13–11	Puerto Rico	Aquatic Center, Santiago; Referees: Hélène Painchaud (CAN); Yuri Machado (BRA)
2 November 2023; 8:00	Report	Score by quarters: 1–2, 4–3, 6–5, 2–1			Aquatic Center, Santiago; Referees: Hélène Painchaud (CAN); Yuri Machado (BRA)
2 November 2023; 8:00	Report	Leonard 5	Goals	Cardona 3	Aquatic Center, Santiago; Referees: Hélène Painchaud (CAN); Yuri Machado (BRA)

2 November 2023; 9:30	Report	Cuba	10–12	Brazil	Aquatic Center, Santiago; Referees: Harvey Hinds (CUW); Danielle Dabbaghian (USA)
2 November 2023; 9:30	Report	Score by quarters: 3–1, 3–5, 2–4, 2–2			Aquatic Center, Santiago; Referees: Harvey Hinds (CUW); Danielle Dabbaghian (USA)
2 November 2023; 9:30	Report	Zunzunegui 5	Goals	Belorio 4	Aquatic Center, Santiago; Referees: Harvey Hinds (CUW); Danielle Dabbaghian (USA)

2 November 2023; 11:00	Report	Canada	33–2	Chile	Aquatic Center, Santiago; Referees: Gerardo Arellano Jr (MEX); Jorge Rincon Patiño (COL)
2 November 2023; 11:00	Report	Score by quarters: 4–0, 9–0, 10–2, 10–0			Aquatic Center, Santiago; Referees: Gerardo Arellano Jr (MEX); Jorge Rincon Patiño (COL)
2 November 2023; 11:00	Report	Bakoc 7	Goals	I. del Villar, S. del Villar 1	Aquatic Center, Santiago; Referees: Gerardo Arellano Jr (MEX); Jorge Rincon Patiño (COL)

2 November 2023; 12:30	Report	Mexico	1–32	United States	Aquatic Center, Santiago; Referees: Ernesto Hernández Toledo (CUB); Xavier Villanueva (CHI)
2 November 2023; 12:30	Report	Score by quarters: 1–10, 0–11, 0–6, 0–5			Aquatic Center, Santiago; Referees: Ernesto Hernández Toledo (CUB); Xavier Villanueva (CHI)
2 November 2023; 12:30	Report	Ramírez 1	Goals	Steffens 7	Aquatic Center, Santiago; Referees: Ernesto Hernández Toledo (CUB); Xavier Villanueva (CHI)

=== 5–8th place semifinals ===
3 November 2023; 8:00	Report	Puerto Rico	9–10	Mexico	Aquatic Center, Santiago; Referees: Dykman Mikhail (CAN); Danielle Dabbaghian (USA)
3 November 2023; 8:00	Report	Score by quarters: 1–3, 2–3, 3–0, 3–4			Aquatic Center, Santiago; Referees: Dykman Mikhail (CAN); Danielle Dabbaghian (USA)
3 November 2023; 8:00	Report	Montalvo, Quiñones 3	Goals	Ramírez 4	Aquatic Center, Santiago; Referees: Dykman Mikhail (CAN); Danielle Dabbaghian (USA)

3 November 2023; 9:30	Report	Cuba	15–13	Chile	Aquatic Center, Santiago; Referees: Jorge Rincon Patiño (COL); Yuri Machado (BRA)
3 November 2023; 9:30	Report	Score by quarters: 4–2, 5–3, 4–3, 2–5			Aquatic Center, Santiago; Referees: Jorge Rincon Patiño (COL); Yuri Machado (BRA)
3 November 2023; 9:30	Report	three players 3	Goals	S. del Villar, Sarmiento 5	Aquatic Center, Santiago; Referees: Jorge Rincon Patiño (COL); Yuri Machado (BRA)

=== Semifinals ===
3 November 2023; 11:00	Report	Argentina	1–27	United States	Aquatic Center, Santiago; Referees: Xavier Villanueva (CHI); Daniel Federico Daners (URU)
3 November 2023; 11:00	Report	Score by quarters: 0–7, 0–7, 1–6, 0–7			Aquatic Center, Santiago; Referees: Xavier Villanueva (CHI); Daniel Federico Daners (URU)
3 November 2023; 11:00	Report	Leonard 1	Goals	four players 4	Aquatic Center, Santiago; Referees: Xavier Villanueva (CHI); Daniel Federico Daners (URU)

3 November 2023; 12:30	Report	Brazil	4–21	Canada	Aquatic Center, Santiago; Referees: Jose Garcia Soto (VEN); Reynel Castillo Torres (PUR)
3 November 2023; 12:30	Report	Score by quarters: 3–7, 0–5, 1–3, 0–6			Aquatic Center, Santiago; Referees: Jose Garcia Soto (VEN); Reynel Castillo Torres (PUR)
3 November 2023; 12:30	Report	Belorio 2	Goals	Lemay-Lavoie 6	Aquatic Center, Santiago; Referees: Jose Garcia Soto (VEN); Reynel Castillo Torres (PUR)

=== Seventh place game ===
4 November 2023; 8:00	Report	Puerto Rico	18–13	Chile	Aquatic Center, Santiago; Referees: Daniel Federico Danes (URU); Jorge Agustin Pinski
4 November 2023; 8:00	Report	Score by quarters: 7–4, 3–3, 2–2, 6–4			Aquatic Center, Santiago; Referees: Daniel Federico Danes (URU); Jorge Agustin Pinski
4 November 2023; 8:00	Report	Guzmán 5	Goals	Henríquez 4	Aquatic Center, Santiago; Referees: Daniel Federico Danes (URU); Jorge Agustin Pinski

=== Fifth place game ===
4 November 2023; 9:30	Report	Mexico	15–11	Cuba	Aquatic Center, Santiago; Referees: Xavier Villanueva Domeque (CHI); Hélène Painchaud
4 November 2023; 9:30	Report	Score by quarters: 4–2, 5–2, 3–2, 3–5			Aquatic Center, Santiago; Referees: Xavier Villanueva Domeque (CHI); Hélène Painchaud
4 November 2023; 9:30	Report	Guzmán 5	Goals	Zunzunegui 5	Aquatic Center, Santiago; Referees: Xavier Villanueva Domeque (CHI); Hélène Painchaud

=== Third place game ===
4 November 2023; 11:00	Report	Argentina	9–10	Brazil	Aquatic Center, Santiago; Referees: Ernesto Hernández Toledo (CUB); Gerardo Arellano Jr
4 November 2023; 11:00	Report	Score by quarters: 3–2, 3–3, 1–1, 2–4			Aquatic Center, Santiago; Referees: Ernesto Hernández Toledo (CUB); Gerardo Arellano Jr
4 November 2023; 11:00	Report	Canda 3	Goals	Ferreira 3	Aquatic Center, Santiago; Referees: Ernesto Hernández Toledo (CUB); Gerardo Arellano Jr

=== Final ===
4 November 2023; 12:30	Report	United States	20–11	Canada	Aquatic Center, Santiago; Referees: Jose Garcia Soto (VEN); German Moller (ARG)
4 November 2023; 12:30	Report	Score by quarters: 5–3, 5–4, 6–2, 4–2			Aquatic Center, Santiago; Referees: Jose Garcia Soto (VEN); German Moller (ARG)
4 November 2023; 12:30	Report	Fattal, Flynn 5	Goals	McKelvey 4	Aquatic Center, Santiago; Referees: Jose Garcia Soto (VEN); German Moller (ARG)

== Final standings ==
Rank	Team
1st place, gold medalist(s)	United States
2nd place, silver medalist(s)	Canada
3rd place, bronze medalist(s)	Brazil
4	Argentina
5	Mexico
6	Cuba
7	Puerto Rico
8	Chile

Qualified for the 2024 Summer Olympics
