= Water polo at the 2022 South American Games =

- Water polo pictogram
- Venue: Centro Acuático Nacional
- Dates: 11−15 October 2022
- Competitors: 168 from 8 nations
- Teams: 13 (6 men and 7 women)

Medalists
gold medal	Brazil (men)
gold medal	Brazil (women)
silver medal	Argentina (men)
silver medal	Argentina (women)
bronze medal	Colombia (men)
bronze medal	Peru (women)

Water polo competitions at the 2022 South American Games in Asunción, Paraguay were held from 11 to 15 October 2022 at the Centro Acuático Nacional cluster.

Two medal events were scheduled to be contested: a men's and women's tournament. A total of 168 athletes (78 athletes–6 teams for men and 91 athletes–7 teams for women) competed in the events. Both tournaments were open competitions without age restrictions.

The gold and silver medalists teams in each tournament qualified for the 2023 Pan American Games water polo competitions, plus Chile which qualified automatically as the 2023 Pan American Games hosts.

Argentina and Brazil were the defending champions of the South American Games men's and women's water polo events. Argentina had won the men's tournament in the last edition in Cochabamba 2018 while Brazil had won the women's tournament in the Medellín 2010 edition (women's event was not held in Santiago 2014 nor Cochabamba 2018).

Brazil won the gold medal in both men's and women's events.

== Participating nations ==
A total of 8 ODESUR nations registered teams for the water polo events. Each nation was able to enter a maximum of 26 athletes (one team of 13 players per gender). Argentina, Brazil, Chile, Colombia and hosts Paraguay participated in both men's and women's tournament. Uruguay participated in the men's tournament, while Peru and Venezuela participated in the women's tournament.

- Argentina (26 players)
- Brazil (26)
- Chile (26)
- Colombia (26)
- Paraguay (26)
- Peru (13)
- Uruguay (13)
- Venezuela (13)

== Medal summary ==
=== Medal table ===
* Host nation (Paraguay)

Rank	Nation	Gold	Silver	Bronze	Total
1	Brazil	2	0	0	2
2	Argentina	0	2	0	2
3	Colombia	0	0	1	1
3	Peru	0	0	1	1
Totals (4 entries)		2	2	2	6

=== Medalists ===
Event	Gold	Silver	Bronze
Men's tournament	Brazil (BRA); Guilherme Barella; Bruno Chiappini; Felipe Henrique Gomes; Gustavo Coutinho; Beto Freitas; Marcos Pedroso; Luiz Octavio Scarabelim; Eduardo Cintra; Bernardo Rocha; Italo Vizacre; Gustavo Guimarães; Luis Ricardo Silva; Alexandre Souza Mendes	Argentina (ARG); Octavio Salas; Ramiro Veich; Tomás Galimberti; Tomás Tilatti; Emanuel López; Tomás Echenique; Guido Martino; Eduardo Bonomo; Exequiel Camnasio; Esteban Corsi; Augusto Antunes; Ignacio Setti; Nicolás Fernández	Colombia (COL); Camilo Camacho; Nelson Bejarano; José Manuel Rengifo; Juan Pablo Guapacha; Santiago Cuervo; Sebastián Muñoz; Santiago Aramburo; Jairo Lizarazo; Alejandro Saldarriaga; Felipe Mora; Enzo Salinas; Juan Felipe Echeverry; Tomás Gil
Women's tournament	Brazil (BRA); Thatiana Pregolini; Diana Abla; Luana Bonetti; Kemily Leão; Luana Ribeiro Quinn; Marcela Marrani Marques; Samantha Ferreira; Jeniffer Cavalcante; Melani Palaro Dias; Rebecca Moreira; Mirella Coutinho; Letícia Belorio; Isabela Rodrigues de Souza	Argentina (ARG); Nahir Stegmayer; Victoria Ruiz; Cecilia Marie; Ashley Hatcher; Ludmila Ianni; Maitena Romano; Julieta Auliel; Celeste Comba; Isabel Riley; Ana Agnesina; Anahí Bacigalupo; María Sol Canda; Lola Canales	Peru (PER); Milagros López; Miranda Nieto; Diana Garnica; Daniela Torres; Belén Torres; Abigail Sirio; Areli Rolando; Carolina Rodríguez; Grecia Nolasco; Anna López; Rebeca Rodríguez; Elisa López; Grecia Bojorquez

== Men's tournament ==
=== Preliminary round ===
Pos	Team	Pld	W	D	L	GF	GA	GD	Pts	Qualification
1	Argentina	5	5	0	0	87	18	+69	10	Semi-finals
2	Brazil	5	4	0	1	76	21	+55	8	Semi-finals
3	Colombia	5	3	0	2	66	34	+32	6	Semi-finals
4	Chile	5	2	0	3	34	50	−16	4	Semi-finals
5	Uruguay	5	1	0	4	43	61	−18	2	Fifth place match
6	Paraguay	5	0	0	5	5	127	−122	0	Fifth place match

Source: ASU2022
Rules for classification: 1) points; 2) head-to-head points; 3) head-to-head goal difference; 4) head-to-head number of goals scored; 5) goal difference.

=== Knockout stage ===
Semi-finals
14 October
Argentina	20
Chile	2
14 October
Brazil	17
Colombia	6

Gold medal match
15 October
Argentina	10 (2)
Brazil (pso)	10 (3)
Bronze medal match
15 October
Chile	6
Colombia	18

Fifth place match
14 October
Uruguay	15
Paraguay	2

=== Final standings ===
Rank	Team
1st place, gold medalist(s)	Brazil
2nd place, silver medalist(s)	Argentina
3rd place, bronze medalist(s)	Colombia
4	Chile
5	Uruguay
6	Paraguay

== Women's tournament ==
=== Group stage ===
==== Group A ====
Pos	Team	Pld	W	D	L	GF	GA	GD	Pts	Qualification
1	Brazil	2	2	0	0	47	4	+43	4	Semi-finals
2	Peru	2	1	0	1	12	25	−13	2	Semi-finals
3	Chile	2	0	0	2	8	38	−30	0	Fifth place match

Source: ASU2022
Rules for classification: 1) points; 2) head-to-head points; 3) head-to-head goal difference; 4) head-to-head number of goals scored; 5) goal difference.

==== Group B ====
Pos	Team	Pld	W	D	L	GF	GA	GD	Pts	Qualification
1	Argentina	3	3	0	0	73	21	+52	6	Semi-finals
2	Venezuela	3	1	1	1	47	33	+14	3	Semi-finals
3	Colombia	3	1	1	1	62	33	+29	3	Fifth place match
4	Paraguay	3	0	0	3	21	116	−95	0	

Source: ASU2022
Rules for classification: 1) points; 2) head-to-head points; 3) head-to-head goal difference; 4) head-to-head number of goals scored; 5) goal difference.

=== Knockout stage ===
Semi-finals
14 October
Brazil	16
Venezuela	3
14 October
Argentina	16
Peru	12

Gold-medal match
15 October
Brazil	14
Argentina	8
Bronze-medal match
15 October
Venezuela	14 (3)
Peru (pso)	14 (4)

Fifth place match
14 October
Colombia	21
Chile	6

=== Final standings ===
Rank	Team
1st place, gold medalist(s)	Brazil
2nd place, silver medalist(s)	Argentina
3rd place, bronze medalist(s)	Peru
4	Venezuela
5	Colombia
6	Chile
7	Paraguay
