= Steve Durham =

Steve Durham may refer to:

- Steven J. Durham, American education commissioner
- Steve Durham (rugby league), rugby league player
- Steve Durham (American football), American football defensive end
- Steven Durham, drummer with the band Lights Action
