= Danny Barnes (rugby league) =

English rugby league footballer

Personal information
- Full name: Danny Barnes

Playing information
- Position: Hooker
Club
Years	Team	Pld	T	G	FG	P
1999	Halifax

Danny Barnes is a former professional rugby league footballer who played in the 1990s. He played at club level for Stanley Rangers ARLFC, and Halifax, as a hooker.

== Club career ==
Danny Barnes played for Halifax in 1999's Super League IV.
