= David Wakefield (rugby league) =

English rugby league footballer (1936–2022)

Personal information
- Full name: David Wakefield
- Born: 4 May 1936
- Died: 14 September 2022 (aged 86)

Playing information
- Position: Hooker
Club
Years	Team	Pld	T	G	FG	P
1956–61	Wakefield Trinity	17	1	0	0	3
1961–63	Doncaster	33	2	0	0	6
	Total	50	3	0	0	9

David Wakefield (4 May 1936 – 14 September 2022) was an English professional rugby league footballer who played in the 1950s and 1960s. He played at club level for Stanley Rangers ARLFC, Wakefield Trinity, and Doncaster, as a hooker.

Wakefield died on 14 September 2022, at the age of 86.
