= Kevin King (rugby league) =

English rugby league footballer

Personal information
- Full name: Kevin King
- Born: 18 January 1985 (age 40)

Playing information
- Position: Centre, Second-row
Club
Years	Team	Pld	T	G	FG	P
2004	Castleford Tigers	1	0	0	0	0
2005	Wakefield Trinity	9	2	0	0	8
2007	Rochdale Hornets	2	0	3	0	6
2008	Batley Bulldogs	1	1	0	0	4
	Total	13	3	3	0	18
- As of 17 April 2021

Kevin King (born 18 January 1985) is a former professional rugby league footballer who played in the 2000s. He played at club level for the Stanley Rangers ARLFC.

In 2004, he played in the Super League IX for the Castleford Tigers. In 2005, he played in the Super League X for the Wakefield Trinity Wildcats. In 2007, he played for the Rochdale Hornets, and in 2008 he played in National League One for the Batley Bulldogs, as an occasional goal-kicking wing, centre, or second-row.
