= Richard Colley (rugby league) =

English rugby league footballer

Personal information
- Full name: Richard Colley
- Born: 9 January 1984 (age 42)

Playing information
- Position: Hooker, Stand-off
Club
Years	Team	Pld	T	G	FG	P
2004	Bradford Bulls	1
2005	Barrow Raiders	2
2008	Batley	1	0	0	0	0
	Total	4	0	0	0	0
- Source: As of 17 April 2021

Richard Colley is a former professional rugby league footballer who played in the 2000s, He played for the Batley Bulldogs in the National League One, as a scrum-half or hooker. He previously played for the Bradford Bulls in the Super League, Stanley Rangers ARLFC and Barrow Raiders.
