= Gareth Dobson =

English rugby league footballer

Personal information
- Full name: Gareth Dobson
- Born: 31 December 1978 (age 47)

Playing information
- Position: Hooker, Loose forward
Club
Years	Team	Pld	T	G	FG	P
1998–2000	Castleford Tigers	11	0	0	0	0
2000–01	York Wasps
2002	Sheffield Eagles
	Total	11	0	0	0	0
- Source: As of 1 May 2012

Gareth Dobson (born 31 December 1978) is a former professional rugby league footballer who played in the 1990s and 2000s. He played at club level for Stanley Rangers ARLFC, Sharlston Rovers ARLFC, the Castleford Tigers, the York Wasps and the Sheffield Eagles, as a hooker, or loose forward.

== Club career ==
Gareth Dobson made his début for Castleford Tigers in the 32-20 victory over Huddersfield Giants on Sunday 20 September 1998, and played for Castleford Tigers in 1998's Super League III, 1999's Super League IV, and 2000's Super League V.
