= Danny Grimshaw =

English rugby league footballer

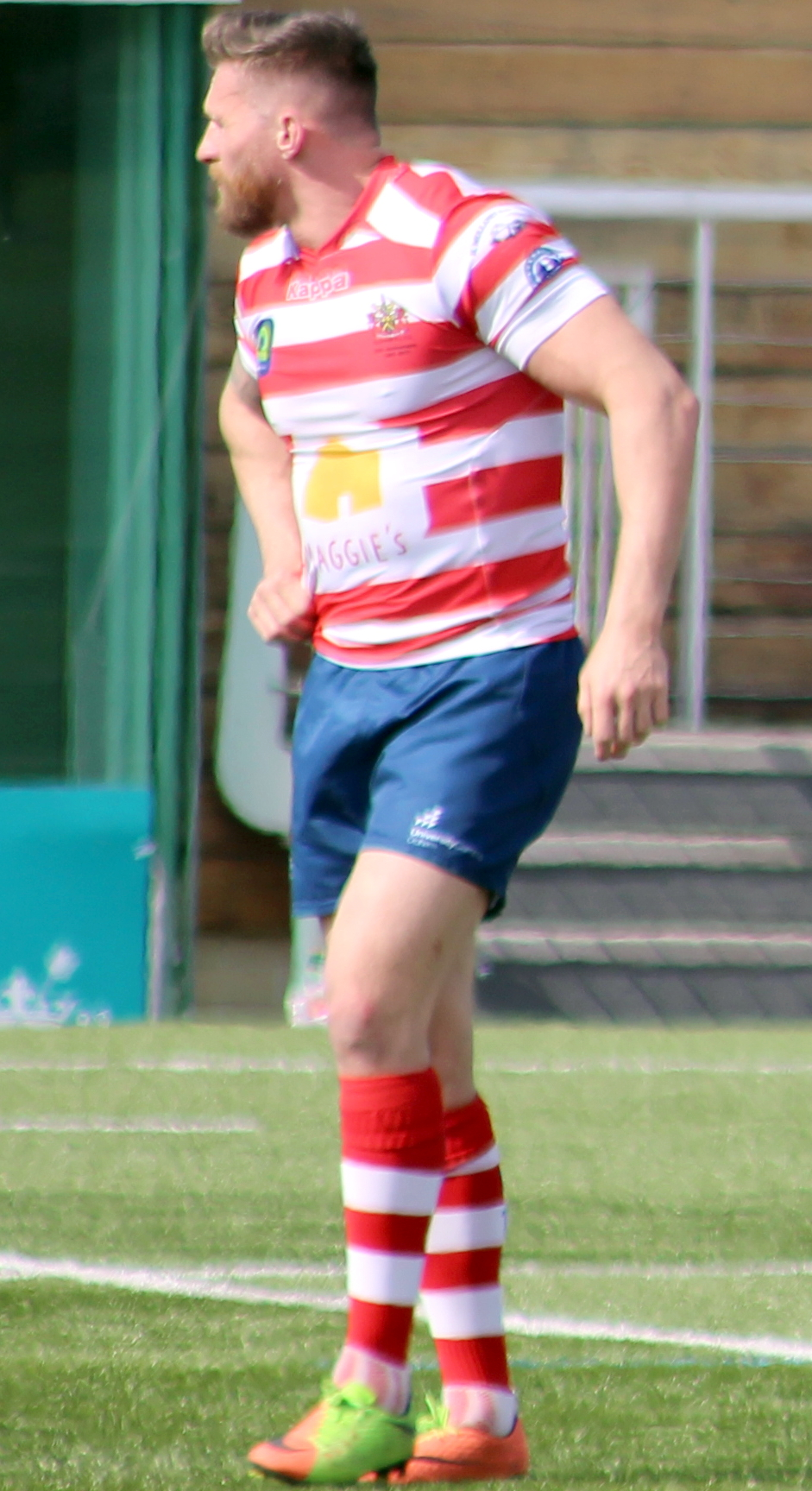

Personal information
- Full name: Daniel Grimshaw
- Born: 25 February 1986 (age 40) Sharlston, West Yorkshire, England

Playing information
- Position: Fullback, Centre, Stand-off, Scrum-half, Loose forward
Club
Years	Team	Pld	T	G	FG	P
2006–09	York City Knights	29	5	14	0	52
2010–15	Hunslet Hawks	51	24	3	0	102
2012	Featherstone Rovers
2013–15	Hunslet Hawks	42	14	0	0	56
2016–17	Oldham	39	8	0	0	32
2018	Hunslet	6	1	0	0	4
2019	Oldham	2	0	0	0	0
	Total	169	52	17	0	246

Danny Grimshaw (born 25 February 1986) is an English former professional rugby league footballer. He has played at club level for Stanley Rangers, in the Pennine League for Sharlston Rovers ARLFC, York City Knights, Hunslet (three spells), and Oldham as a fullback, centre, stand-off, scrum-half, or loose forward, and consequently he is considered a utility player.

== Background ==
Danny Grimshaw was born in Sharlston, Wakefield, West Yorkshire, England.
