= Phil Payne =

English rugby league footballer

Personal information
- Full name: Philip Payne

Playing information
- Position: Centre
Club
Years	Team	Pld	T	G	FG	P
1985–86	Castleford	15	3			12

Philip Payne is a former professional rugby league footballer who played in the 1980s. He played at club level for Stanley Rangers ARLFC, and Castleford (Heritage No.), as a centre.
