= Andy Speak =

English rugby league footballer

Personal information
- Full name: Andrew Speak
- Born: 21 January 1980 (age 46)

Playing information
- Position: Hooker
Club
Years	Team	Pld	T	G	FG	P
1996–99	Leeds Rhinos	4	1	0	0	4
1999	Sheffield Eagles
1999	Halifax
2000	Wakefield Trinity Wildcats	11	2	0	0	8
2001	Castleford Tigers	8	0	0	0	0
2002	Dewsbury Rams
2007	Doncaster
2008–??	Batley Bulldogs
2007	Doncaster

Andy Speak (born 21 January 1980) is a former professional rugby league footballer who played in the 1990s and 2000s. He played at club level for Stanley Rangers ARLFC, Leeds Rhinos, Sheffield Eagles, Halifax, Wakefield Trinity Wildcats, Castleford Tigers, Dewsbury Rams, Doncaster (two spells), and the Batley Bulldogs, as a hooker.
