= Chris Molyneux =

English rugby league footballer

Personal information
- Full name: Chris Molyneux

Playing information
- Position: Prop
Club
Years	Team	Pld	T	G	FG	P
1999	Sheffield Eagles
2000–02	Huddersfield Giants
2003	Featherstone Rovers
2004	Batley Bulldogs
	Total	0	0	0	0	0

Chris Molyneux is a former professional rugby league footballer who played in the 1990s and 2000s. He played at club level for the Stanley Rangers ARLFC, the Sheffield Eagles, the Huddersfield Giants, Featherstone Rovers, and the Batley Bulldogs, as a prop.

== Club career ==
Chris Molyneux played in 1999's Super League IV, 2000's Super League V, and 2001's Super League VI.
