= Paul Hughes (rugby league) =

English rugby league footballer

Personal information
- Full name: Paul Hughes
- Born: 28 December 1984 (age 41)

Playing information
- Position: Hooker
Club
Years	Team	Pld	T	G	FG	P
2006–07	Featherstone Rovers	58	19	0	1	77
2008–09	York City Knights	53	24	0	0	96
	Dewsbury Rams
2010–11	Doncaster
2013	Hunslet RLFC
	Total	111	43	0	1	173
- Relatives: Carl Hughes (brother)

Paul Hughes is a former professional rugby league footballer who played in the 2000s. He played at club level for Stanley Rangers ARLFC, Featherstone Rovers, York City Knights, Dewsbury Rams, and Doncaster, as a hooker.
