= Jessica Gaudreault =

Canadian water polo player (born 1994)

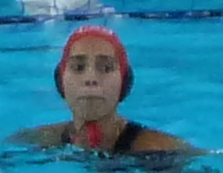

Personal information
- Nationality: Canadian
- Born: July 18, 1994 (age 32) Mississauga, Ontario
- Height: 1.71 m (5 ft 7 in)
- Weight: 65 kg (143 lb)

Sport
- Sport: Water polo
- Position: Goalkeeper
- Current club: Capital Wave
- Number: 1
Medal record
Women's water polo
Representing Canada
Pan American Games
Silver medal – second place	2015 Toronto	Team
Silver medal – second place	2019 Lima	Team
Silver medal – second place	2023 Santiago	Team
FINA World League
Silver medal – second place	2017 Shanghai

Jessica Gaudreault (born July 18, 1994) is a Canadian water polo goalkeeper. She won the silver medal with the Women's National Team at the 2015 Pan American Games and the 2019 Pan American Games

== Early life ==
Gaudreault was born on July 18, 1994, to Eric Gaudreault and AJ Tiwana in Mississauga, Ontario. She began playing water polo at 13 years old after not enjoying competitive swimming. She grew up in Ottawa, Ontario having graduated from St. Joseph School in 2012. She plays for the Capital Wave Swimming and Water Polo Club in Ottawa.

== College career ==
Gaudreault attended Indiana University playing for Indiana Hoosiers. She was named to the CWPA All-Conference First Team as a freshman and sophomore.

After a two year training period with the Canadian Women's Senior National Team, Gaudreault returned to Indiana in 2017 and utilized her final two years of eligibility. Gaudreault was named a Hoosier's Award Winner following the 2017 season, and All-American Honorable Mention in 2018. She completed her career ranked second in All-Time Career Saves (995) and in shots faced (2182).

Gaudreault graduated from Indiana in 2018 with a Bachelor's in Human Biology and a minor in French.

== International career ==
Gaudreault has made multiple national team appearances since 2008, where she made her debut at the Junior Pan American Championships winning gold. She would wind gold again in 2010 at the same tournament. She would compete at the FINA Junior World Championship in 2011 finishing in 9th place. She would then compete on Canada's Youth Team for the FINA Youth World Championships in 2012 earning a 5th Place finish.

In 2013, Gaudreault would compete in the FISU Games finishing in 4th; later in the year she would compete for the Junior Team at the FINA Junior World Championships finishing in 9th place. Following her 2014 collegiate season, Gaudreault would compete on the Team Canada Senior Team finishing sixth at the FINA World League. In 2015, Team Canada finished 11th at the FINA World Championships; weeks later, Gaudreault would earn a silver medal at the 2015 Pan American Games.

In 2017 she won the silver medal at the 2017 FINA Women's Water Polo World League in Shanghai, China, being named Best Goalkeeper of the tournament, also named to the media’s All-Star team.

In 2018, Gaudreault would be the starting goalie for the 2018 FINA World League in Budapest finishing in fourth place, the highest in Team history. They would return to the FINA World League in 2019 finishing in 7th; weeks later, Gaudreault would lead Team Canada to a Silver Medal finish at the Pan American Games in Lima, Peru where Team Canada would earn a bid to the Olympics (Team USA had earned their bid by winning the World League).
