= Carl Hughes =

English rugby league footballer

Personal information
- Full name: Carl Hughes
- Born: 30 November 1982 (age 43)

Playing information
Club
Years	Team	Pld	T	G	FG	P
2005–06	York City Knights
2007–08	Featherstone Rovers	41+32	34	0	0	136
2009–10	Keighley
2011–13	Doncaster	42	19	0	0	76
	Total	115	53	0	0	212
- Relatives: Paul Hughes (brother)

Carl Hughes is a professional rugby league footballer who has played in the 2000s and 2010s. He has played for Stanley Rangers ARLFC, York City Knights, Featherstone Rovers, Keighley and Doncaster.
