= Adam Robinson (rugby league) =

English rugby league footballer

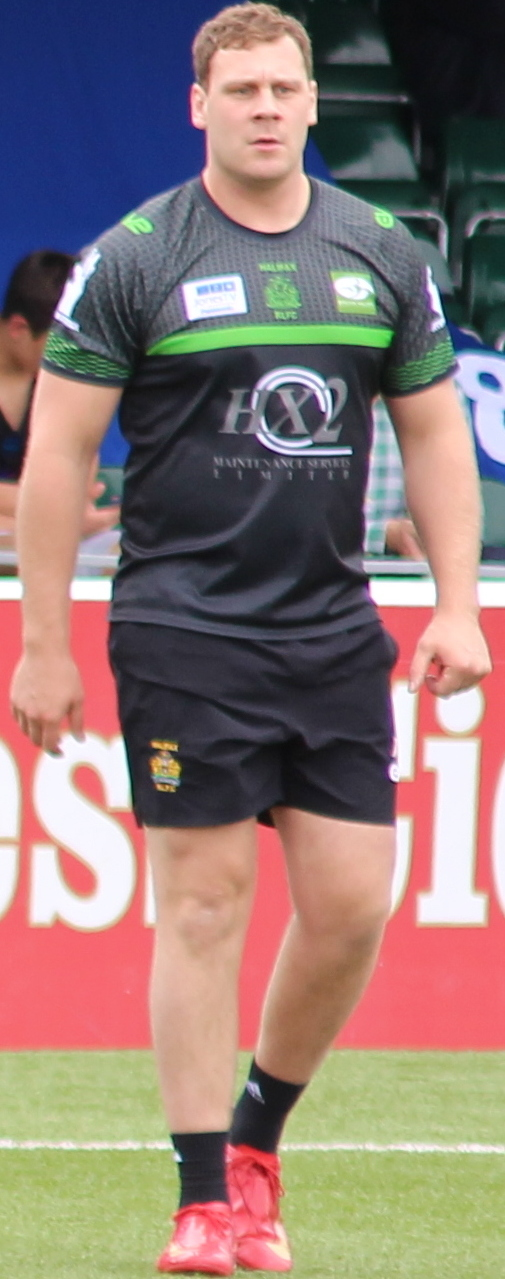

Personal information
- Born: 8 April 1987 (age 39)

Playing information
- Position: Prop, Second-row
Club
Years	Team	Pld	T	G	FG	P
	Wakefield Trinity Wildcats
2006	Doncaster	15+20	15	0	0	20
2008	Oldham	35	5	0	0	20
2009–10	Dewsbury Rams	32	18	0	0	40
2011	Batley Bulldogs	14	5	0	0	20
2012–16	Halifax	78	25	0	0	60
2017–18	York City Knights	40	9	0	0	36
2019–	Hunslet	20	9	0	0	12
	Total	254	86	0	0	208
- Source: As of 1 May 2012

Adam Robinson (born 8 April 1987) is a professional rugby league footballer who plays in League 1 for Hunslet.

He has previously played at club level for Stanley Rangers ARLFC, Wakefield Trinity, Doncaster, Oldham, Dewsbury Rams, Batley Bulldogs, Halifax and York City Knights, as a prop or second-row.

Robinson initially joined York on-loan in June 2016 and scored three tries in his four games including twice on his debut against Oxford. His move to York was made permanent with the offer of a one-year deal for the 2017 season, which was later extended until the end of 2018.

In October 2018 he signed a one-year deal with Hunslet.
