= Robin Jowitt =

English rugby league footballer

Personal information
- Full name: Robin Jowitt

Playing information
- Position: Prop
Club
| Years | Team | Pld | T | G | FG | P |
|---|---|---|---|---|---|---|
| 2000–01 | Dewsbury Rams | 2 |
| | Gateshead Thunder |
| 2003 | Featherstone Rovers |
| | Total | 2 | 0 | 0 | 0 | 0 |

Robin Jowitt is a professional rugby league footballer who played in the 2000s. He played at club level for Stanley Rangers ARLFC, Dewsbury Rams, Gateshead Thunder, and Featherstone Rovers, as a prop.
