= Matt Wray =

English rugby league footballer

Personal information
- Full name: Matt Wray
- Born: 15 May 1984 (age 41)

Playing information
- Position: Wing
Club
Years	Team	Pld	T	G	FG	P
2002–03	Wakefield Trinity Wildcats	16	2	0	0	8
2004–06	Featherstone Rovers	71+1	33	0	0	132
?–?	Hunslet Hawks
	Total	88	35	0	0	140

Matt Wray is a professional rugby league footballer who played in the 2000s. He played at club level for Stanley Rangers ARLFC, Wakefield Trinity Wildcats, Featherstone Rovers, and Hunslet Hawks, as a wing.
