= Craig Robinson (rugby league) =

English rugby league footballer

Personal information
- Full name: Craig Robinson
- Born: 30 July 1985 (age 39)
- Height: 5 ft 10 in (178 cm)
- Weight: 16 st 3 lb (103 kg)

Playing information
- Position: Prop, Second-row, Loose forward
Club
Years	Team	Pld	T	G	FG	P
2005	Wakefield Trinity Wildcats	1	0	0	0	0
2006–08	Rochdale Hornets
2009–10	Oldham	35	3	0	0	12
2011–2015	Doncaster	96	9	0	0	36
2016	Hunslet
	Total	132	12	0	0	48
- Source: As of 26 July 2015

Craig Robinson (born 30 July 1985) is an English professional rugby league footballer who has played in the 2000s and 2010s. He has played for the Stanley Rangers, in 2005's Super League X for the Wakefield Trinity Wildcats, in the Championship for the Rochdale Hornets, Oldham, Doncaster and Hunslet, as a prop, second-row or loose forward.
