= Barry Lumb =

English rugby league footballer

Personal information
- Full name: Barry Lumb

Playing information
- Position: Wing
Club
Years	Team	Pld	T	G	FG	P
1973–75/76	Wakefield Trinity	48	8	54	0	132

Barry Lumb is a former professional rugby league footballer who played in the 1970s. He played at club level for the Stanley Rangers ARLFC, and Wakefield Trinity, as a goal-kicking wing.

== Playing career ==
=== Club career ===
Barry Lumb made his début for Wakefield Trinity during March 1973, and he played his last match for Wakefield Trinity during the 1975–76 season.
