= Keith Jones (rugby league) =

English rugby league footballer

Personal information
- Full name: Keith Jones

Playing information
Club
| Years | Team | Pld | T | G | FG | P |
|---|---|---|---|---|---|---|
| 1984–88 | Castleford | 21 | 1 | 2 | | 8 |
| 1988–90 | Doncaster | 51 | 10 | 50 | 0 | 140 |
| | Total | 72 | 11 | 52 | 0 | 148 |

Keith Jones is a former professional rugby league footballer who played in the 1980s and 1990s. He played at club level for Stanley Rangers ARLFC, Castleford and Doncaster.
