= Stanley Rangers =

English amateur rugby league club, based near Wakefield, West Yorkshire, England

Club information
- Full name: Stanley Rangers Amateur Rugby League Football Club
- Founded: 1919; 107 years ago

Current details
- Competition: National Conference League

Stanley Rangers (founded 1919) is an amateur rugby league club situated in the village of Stanley near Wakefield. They are in Division One of the National Conference League. Players range from 8-years old and receive training in all aspects of the sport. Many younger players have attended Paul Sculthorpe's training camps.

== Current Stanley Rangers ARLFC coaches who play(ed) professional rugby league ==
- Iain Bowie: Wakefield Trinity, Dewsbury, Nottingham City?/Nottingham Outlaws?, Hunslet
- Mark Conway: Leeds, Wakefield Trinity
- Steve Durham: Hull FC, Wakefield Trinity
- Jamie Field: Huddersfield, Wakefield Trinity
- Ryan Hudson: Huddersfield, Wakefield Trinity, Castleford, Bradford
- Gez King: Dewsbury
- Gary Lord: Wakefield Trinity, Dewsbury
- Ian Sampson: Bramley, Hunslet
- Lee Sampson: Hunslet
- Steve Abrahams: Wakefield Trinity

== Former Stanley Rangers players who have turned professional ==
- Jack Abson: Dewsbury Rams
- Mark Applegarth: Wakefield Trinity Wildcats, York City Knights
- Nathan Armitage: Bradford Bulls, Batley Bulldogs
- Mark Aston: Sheffield Eagles (1984), Featherstone Rovers, Bramley RLFC, Sheffield Eagles, Great Britain
- Danny Barnes: Halifax
- John Barnes: Dewsbury Rams
- James Brown: Sheffield Eagles
- Steve Brown: Wakefield Trinity Wildcats
- Craig Cawthray: Featherstone Rovers, Hunslet Hawks
- Chris Chester: Halifax, Wigan Warriors, Hull FC, Hull Kingston Rovers
- Scott Childs: Hunslet Hawks
- Michael "Micky" Clarkson: Wakefield Trinity Wildcats, Featherstone Rovers
- Mark Colbeck: Wakefield Trinity Wildcats
- Richard Colley: Bradford Bulls, Barrow Raiders, Batley Bulldogs
- Mark Conway: Leeds Rhinos, Wakefield Trinity
- Ben Cooper: Sheffield Eagles, Huddersfield Giants, Leigh Centurions
- Liam Crawley: Dewsbury Rams, Doncaster
- Paul Crook: Oldham R.L.F.C.
- Kevin Crowther: Bradford Bulls, Wakefield Trinity Wildcats, London Broncos, Warrington Wolves, Dewsbury Rams, Batley Bulldogs,
- James Davey: Wakefield Trinity Wildcats
- Gareth Dobson: Castleford Tigers
- Steve Durham: Hull FC, Wakefield Trinity
- Kevin Eadie: Featherstone Rovers, Doncaster
- Barry Eaton: Wales, Doncaster, Wakefield Trinity, Dewsbury Rams, Castleford Tigers, Widnes Vikings, Keighley Cougars,
- James Endersby: Leeds Carnegie, Leeds Rhinos, Doncaster
- Gareth Firm: Hunslet Hawks
- Albert 'Budgie' Firth: Wakefield Trinity, York F.C.
- Matt Firth: Halifax, Keighley Cougars, Rochdale Hornets, Hunslet Hawks
- David Foster: Halifax, Keighley Cougars, Hunslet Hawks
- Richard Goddard: Wakefield Trinity, Castleford Tigers, York F.C., Sheffield Eagles
- Stuart Godfrey: York City Knights
- Chris Green: Dewsbury Rams
- Simon Greenwood-Haigh: Hunslet Hawks
- Chris Grice: Hunslet Hawks, Dewsbury Rams
- Danny Grice: York City Knights
- Josh Griffin: Wakefield Trinity Wildcats, Huddersfield Giants
- Danny Grimshaw: York City Knights, Hunslet Hawks
- Adie Hampshire: York City Knights
- Willie Hargreaves: York F.C.
- Billy Harris: Castleford Tigers
- John Hirst: Wakefield Trinity Wildcats
- Andy Hobson: Halifax, Widnes Vikings, Dewsbury Rams, Leigh Centurions, Blackpool Panthers
- Ryan Hudson: Huddersfield Giants, Wakefield Trinity Wildcats, Castleford Tigers, Bradford Bulls
- Carl Hughes: York City Knights, Featherstone Rovers, Keighley Cougars, Doncaster
- Paul Hughes: Featherstone Rovers, York City Knights, Dewsbury Rams, Doncaster
- Keiran Hyde: Bradford Bulls, Wakefield Trinity Wildcats
- Craig Ibbotson: Hunslet Hawks
- Keith Jones: Castleford Tigers
- Kevin Jones: Castleford Tigers
- Robin Jowitt: Dewsbury Rams, Gateshead Thunder, Featherstone Rovers,
- Warren Jowitt: Bradford Bulls, Wakefield Trinity Wildcats, Salford City Reds, Hull FC, Dewsbury Rams
- Stuart Kain: Castleford Tigers, Gateshead Thunder, Hunslet Hawks,
- Billy Kershaw: Dewsbury Rams, Sheffield Eagles
- Kevin King: Castleford Tigers, Wakefield Trinity Wildcats Rochdale Hornets, Batley Bulldogs
- Matty King: Wakefield Trinity Wildcats
- Danny Kirmond: Featherstone Rovers, Huddersfield Giants, Wakefield Trinity Wildcats
- Gary Lord: Castleford Tigers, Oldham R.L.F.C., Wakefield Trinity Wildcats, Featherstone Rovers
- Paul Lord: Oldham R.L.F.C., Swinton Lions, Wakefield Trinity Wildcats
- Barry Lumb: Wakefield Trinity
- Gordon Lynch: Doncaster
- Tom Lynch: Hull FC, Featherstone Rovers
- Anthony Marsh: Doncaster
- Richard Marsh: Doncaster
- Billy Maxwell: Dewsbury Rams
- Allister McMaster: Dewsbury Rams
- Adam Milner: Castleford Tigers
- Laurence "Laurie" Milner: York F.C.
- Dean Mountain: Castleford Tigers
- Chris Molyneux: Huddersfield Giants, Sheffield Eagles, Batley Bulldogs, Featherstone Rovers
- Phil Payne: Castleford Tigers
- Mark Pease: Leeds Tykes
- Adam Robinson: Wakefield Trinity Wildcats, Doncaster, Oldham R.L.F.C., Dewsbury Rams, Batley Bulldogs
- Craig Robinson: Wakefield Trinity Wildcats, Rochdale Hornets, Oldham R.L.F.C., Doncaster
- Darren Rogers: Castleford Tigers, Dewsbury Rams
- Dean Sampson: Great Britain, England, Castleford Tigers, Hunslet Hawks
- Gary Shillabeer (Shillabear): Huddersfield Giants, Featherstone Rovers, Batley Bulldogs
- Sean (Shawn) Snowden: Castleford Tigers
- Andy Speak: Leeds Rhinos, Sheffield Eagles, Halifax, Wakefield Trinity Wildcats, Castleford Tigers, Dewsbury Rams
- Rob Spicer: Wakefield Trinity Wildcats, York City Knights, Dewsbury Rams
- Clayton Stott: Leeds Rhinos
- Craig Taylor: Dewsbury Rams, Hunslet Hawks
- Geoff Tennant: Bramley RLFC
- Geoff Tomlinson: Bramley RLFC
- Kyle Trout: Wakefield Trinity Wildcats
- Craig Vines: Leeds Rhinos
- David Wakefield: Wakefield Trinity, Doncaster
- Scott Walker: Leeds Rhinos, Hunslet Hawks
- Kevin Ward: Great Britain, Castleford Tigers, Manly-Warringah, St. Helens,
- John Wells: Halifax
- David White: Wakefield Trinity Wildcats, Featherstone Rovers
- Gareth Whitehead: Hunslet Hawks
- Taron Wildey: Wakefield Trinity Wildcats, Dewsbury Rams
- Matthew Wildie: Wakefield Trinity Wildcats
- Jack Wilson: York F.C.
- Chris Woolford: Dewsbury Rams
- Danny Wray: Dewsbury Rams
- Matt Wray: Wakefield Trinity Wildcats, Featherstone Rovers, Hunslet Hawks
- Nigel Wright: Wakefield Trinity Wildcats, Wigan, Huddersfield Giants,
