= Billy Kershaw =

English rugby league footballer

Personal information
- Full name: Billy Kershaw

Playing information
- Position: Second-row
Club
| Years | Team | Pld | T | G | FG | P |
|---|---|---|---|---|---|---|
| 2000 | Dewsbury Rams |
| 2002 | Sheffield Eagles |
| 2003 | Dewsbury Rams |
| | Total | 0 | 0 | 0 | 0 | 0 |

Billy Kershaw is a professional rugby league footballer who played in the 2000s. He played at club level for Stanley Rangers ARLFC, Dewsbury Rams (two spells), and Sheffield Eagles, as a second-row.
