= Dean Mountain =

English rugby league footballer

Personal information
- Full name: Dean Mountain

Playing information
- Position: Prop, Second-row
Club
| Years | Team | Pld | T | G | FG | P |
|---|---|---|---|---|---|---|
| 1983–88 | Castleford | 47 | 4 | 0 | 0 | 16 |
| 1989–90 | Ryedale-York | 5 | 0 | 0 | 0 | 0 |
| 1989–91 | Huddersfield | 12 | 0 | 0 | 0 | 0 |
| | Total | 64 | 4 | 0 | 0 | 16 |
Representative
| Years | Team | Pld | T | G | FG | P |
| 1987 | Great Britain U21 | 1 | 0 | 0 | 0 | 0 |

Dean Mountain is a police officer, and a professional rugby league footballer who played in the 1980s and 1990s. He played at club level for Stanley Rangers ARLFC, Pointer Panthers (now named Castleford Panthers), Castleford, Ryedale-York and Huddersfield, as a prop, or second-row, his rugby league career was ended by damage to his cruciate ligaments, sustained during a tackle in an A-Team evening game in January 1991, following a recovery from a broken bone in his thumb.

Mountain also represented Great Britain under-21s against France in 1987.

== Personal life ==
Mountain is the older brother of the rugby league footballer for Huddersfield and York; Gary Mountain.
