= Matt Firth =

English rugby league footballer

Personal information
- Born: 19 February 1982 (age 43)

Playing information
- Position: Stand-off, Scrum-half, Hooker
Club
Years	Team	Pld	T	G	FG	P
2000–01	Halifax	14	0	0	0	0
2002–05	Keighley Cougars	119	28	0	6	118
2006	Rochdale Hornets	29	2	0	0	8
2007	Hunslet Hawks	29	3	0	0	12
	Total	191	33	0	6	138

Matt Firth (born 19 February 1982) is a professional rugby league footballer who played in the 2000s. He played at club level for Stanley Rangers ARLFC, Halifax, Keighley Cougars, Rochdale Hornets and Hunslet Hawks, as a stand-off, scrum-half or hooker.

== Club career ==
Firth played for Halifax in the 2000 Super League V and the 2001 Super League VI.
