= Kevin Jones (rugby league) =

English rugby league footballer

Personal information
- Full name: Kevin Jones
- Born: 25 February 1964 (age 61)

Playing information
- Height: 5 ft 6 in (168 cm)
- Position: Stand-off, Scrum-half
Club
Years	Team	Pld	T	G	FG	P
1983–85	Castleford	21	4	39		92
1985–92	Doncaster	151	61	24	2	294
	Total	172	65	63	2	386

Kevin Jones (born February 25, 1964) is a former professional rugby league footballer who played in the 1980s and 1990s. He played at club level for Stanley Rangers ARLFC, Castleford and Doncaster, as a stand-off, or scrum-half.
