= Tracy Grose =

NCAA soccer coach and former professional soccer player

Personal information
- Full name: Tracy Lynn Grose
- Date of birth: July 31, 1977
- Place of birth: St. Charles, Missouri, United States
- Date of death: September 12, 2020 (aged 43)
- Place of death: Ashland, Oregon, United States
- Height: 5 ft 5 in (1.65 m)
- Position: Forward

College career
Years	Team	Apps	(Gls)
1995–1999	Indiana Hoosiers		(32)

Senior career*
Years	Team	Apps	(Gls)
1997–2000	Indiana Blaze		
2002	Carolina Courage	1	(0)

Managerial career
- 2000: Indiana Hoosiers (assistant)
- 2001–2008: Northern Arizona Lumberjacks (assistant)
- 2009–2010: Iowa State Cyclones (assistant)
- * Club domestic league appearances and goals

Tracy Lynn Grose (July 31, 1977 – September 12, 2020) was a professional soccer player and college soccer coach.

== Early life ==
While playing for JB Marine SC in St. Louis, Mo., Grose was a member of two national championship teams. Grose's 1998 (U23) and 1993 (U16) squads were champions, while taking third place in 1995 (U18).

=== Indiana University ===
- 1998 NSCAA All American (First woman All American in Indiana history); 1998 NSCAA All Great Lakes Region 1st Team; 1998 1st Team All Big Ten; 1998 Indiana school record, single season scoring (37 points on 15 goals, 7 assists); led Indiana to 2nd Round of NCAA tournament
- 1996 Big Ten Freshman Player of the Year; 2nd Team All Big Ten Conference

== Professional ==
=== Carolina Courage ===
In 2002, she played for the Carolina Courage.

== Coaching career ==
She was an assistant coach for Indiana Hoosiers, Northern Arizona Lumberjacks, and Iowa State Cyclones.

Grose served as administrative assistant for the Southern Illinois University Edwardsville men's soccer program.

== Personal life and death ==
She married her husband Jerome Souers in 2015.

She died September 12, 2020.
