= Paul Crook (rugby league, born 1974) =

English rugby league footballer

Personal information
- Full name: Paul Crook
- Born: 12 February 1974 (age 51); Wakefield, West Riding of Yorkshire, England

Playing information
- Position: Centre, Loose forward, Second-row, Stand-off
Club
Years	Team	Pld	T	G	FG	P
1993–95	Dewsbury	16	1	0	0	4
1995–96	Oldham	51	3	7	0	26
1997	Lancashire Lynx
1997	Hull FC	7	0	0	0	0
1997(loan)	→Dewsbury			0	0
1998–99	Oldham
2000	Lancashire Lynx
	Total	74	4	7	0	30

Paul Crook (born 12 February 1974) is an English former professional rugby league footballer who played in the 1990s. He played at club level for Stanley Rangers ARLFC, and Oldham in 1996's Super League I, Hull FC, Dewsbury and Lancashire Lynx.

== Background ==
Paul Crook was born in Wakefield, West Riding of Yorkshire.
