= David Foster (rugby league) =

English rugby league footballer

Personal information
- Full name: David Paul Foster
- Born: 19 February 1980 (age 45)

Playing information
- Height: 5 ft 9.9 in (1.775 m)
- Position: Centre, Hooker, Second-row
Club
Years	Team	Pld	T	G	FG	P
1999–01	Halifax	13	0	0	0	0
2001	Huddersfield Giants	2	0	0	0	0
2001–02	Oldham RLFC	6	5	0	0	20
	Total	21	5	0	0	20

David Foster is a former professional rugby league footballer who played in the 1990s and 2000s. He played at club level for the Stanley Rangers ARLFC, Halifax, Oldham RLFC, and Huddersfield Giants, as a centre, hooker, or second-row.

== Club career ==
David Foster played for Halifax in 1999's Super League IV, 2000's Super League V, and 2001's Super League VI.
