= Indiana Collegiate Hockey Conference =

Indiana Collegiate Hockey Conference Men's ice hockey tournament
- Teams: Hoosiers; Miami Redhawks; Boilermakers; Thunder; Bulldogs; Ocelots
- Indiana Collegiate Hockey Conference Men's Ice Hockey Tournaments

The Indiana Collegiate Hockey Conference is a collegiate hockey conference within Division 3 of the American Collegiate Hockey Association. The ICHC facilitates and fosters competitive, academic and operational excellence for its member institutions through the club sport of ice hockey. The conference supports a culture of professionalism and integrity all while creating a positive experience for the student-athletes and academic institutions it serves.

== About ==
The ICHC began play in the 2014–2015 season. All four teams participated in the ICHC Showcase, which were the first games in conference history, from October 10–12, 2014. The showcase was hosted by IPFW. The first ICHC Playoffs took place from February 13-14th, 2015 and was hosted by Purdue.

== Members ==
=== Maroon Conference ===
School	Location	Nickname	Joined	Primary conference	Website	Team colors
Indiana University	Bloomington, IN	Hoosiers	2014	B1G (DI)		
Miami University	Oxford, OH	RedHawks	2018	MAC (DI)		
Purdue University	West Lafayette, IN	Boilermakers	2014	B1G (DI)		
Trine University	Angola, IN	Thunder	2018	MIAA (DIII)		

=== White Conference ===
School	Location	Nickname	Joined	Primary conference	Website	Team colors
Butler University	Indianapolis, IN	Bulldogs	2016	Big East (DI)		
IU Northwest	Gary, IN	RedHawks	2019	AII (NAIA)		
Schoolcraft College	Livonia, MI	Ocelots	2019	NJCAA		

== Former members ==
- Ball State University (2014-2019)
- IPFW (2014-2018)
- Xavier University (2015-2017) moved to ACHA Division II

== Crossroads Cup Champions ==
Season	Winner	Host
2014–15	Purdue	Purdue
2015–16	Indiana	-
2016–17	Indiana	-
2017–18	Indiana	-
2018–19	Indiana	Trine
2019–20	TBD	Trine
