= Steve Durham (rugby league) =

English rugby league footballer

Personal information
- Full name: Stephen Durham
- Born: 12 October 1963 (age 63)

Playing information
- Position: Prop
Club
Years	Team	Pld	T	G	FG	P
1986–87	Batley	40	6	0	0	24
1988–91	Bramley	66	7	16	0	60
1990–93	Hull FC	17	1	0	0	4
1993–95	Wakefield Trinity	24	2	0	0	8
1995	Hunslet RLFC	3	0	0	0	0
	Total	150	16	16	0	96

Steve Durham (born 12 October 1963) is a former professional rugby league footballer who played in the 1980s and 1990s. He played at representative level for the British Amateur Rugby League Association "Young Lions" New Zealand tour 1983, and at club level for Stanley Rangers ARLFC, Batley, Bramley, Hull FC and Wakefield Trinity as a prop.

== Playing career ==
=== Club career ===
During Steve's time with Bramley, he made his debut against Sheffield Eagles on 28 August 1988 during the 1988-89 season, playing his last game in January 1991, against Workington Town in the 1990-91 season Steve Durham made his début for Wakefield Trinity during October 1993, and he played his last match for Wakefield Trinity during the 1994–95 season.
