= Indiana, Our Indiana =

School fight song of Indiana University

"Indiana, Our Indiana" is the official school fight song of Indiana University. The lyrics were written by IU band director, Russell P. Harker, to the tune of the trio from "The Viking March" by Karl King, conductor of the Barnum and Bailey Circus Band.

One notable difference between the trio from "The Viking March" and the fight song as played by the Marching Hundred is that in the original Viking March, the third phrase of the trio ends in a tonic chord, whereas the third phrase of "Indiana, Our Indiana" ends in a major mediant chord. Some rival bands, such as the Ohio State University Marching Band, frequently overlook this detail when performing Indiana, Our Indiana.

The song was first performed by the IU Band during a football game against Northwestern University in November 1912. The song was also featured in the 1979 film, Breaking Away.

In recent years, Hoosier fans have adopted the first words of the breakstrain, "never daunted," as a battle cry. Indiana's athletic department uses "#NeverDaunted" as its primary hashtag on social media.

== Lyrics ==
Indiana, Our Indiana
Indiana, we're all for you
We will fight for
the Cream and Crimson
For the glory of old IU
Never daunted, we cannot falter
In the battle, we're tried and true
Indiana, Our Indiana
Indiana, we're all for you!
