= Rob Spicer =

English rugby league footballer

Personal information
- Full name: Robert Spicer
- Born: 22 September 1984 (age 41)

Playing information
- Position: Wing, Centre, Second-row, Loose forward
Club
Years	Team	Pld	T	G	FG	P
2002–05	Wakefield Trinity Wildcats	46	4	0	0	16
2006–08	York City Knights	52	14	0	0	56
2009–18	Dewsbury Rams	173	28	0	0	112
	Total	271	46	0	0	184

Rob Spicer was a professional rugby league footballer who played for the Dewsbury Rams in the Championship. He played as a wing, Centre, Second-row or Loose forward.

He has previously played at club level for Stanley Rangers, the Wakefield Trinity Wildcats, the York City Knights and the Dewsbury Rams.
