= Gustavo Guimarães =

Brazilian water polo player

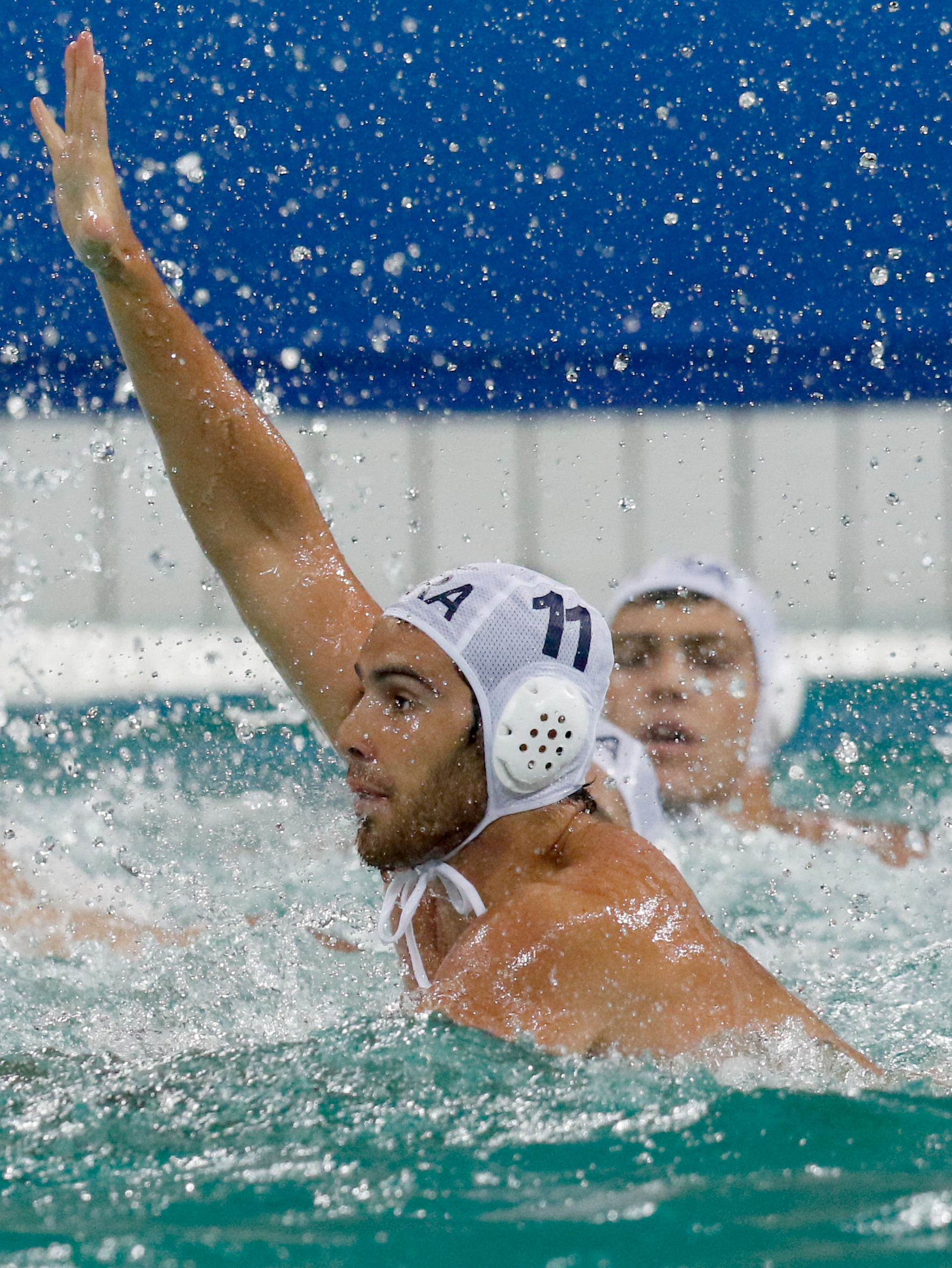
- Guimarães in Rio 2016

Personal information
- Born: 24 January 1994 (age 32)
- Height: 186 cm (6 ft 1 in)
- Weight: 89 kg (196 lb)

Sport
- Sport: Water polo
- Club: Pinheiros
Medal record
Representing Brazil
Pan American Games
Silver medal – second place	2015 Toronto	Team
Silver medal – second place	2023 Santiago	Team
Bronze medal – third place	2011 Guadalajara	Team
Bronze medal – third place	2019 Lima	Team

Gustavo de Freitas Guimarães (born 24 January 1994) is a water polo player from Brazil. He was part of the Brazilian team at the 2016 Summer Olympics, where the team was eliminated in the quarterfinals.
