= Diana Abla =

Brazilian water polo player (born 1995)

Personal information
- Full name: Diana Monteiro Abla
- Born: 29 July 1995 (age 30) Brazil
- Height: 175 cm (5 ft 9 in)
- Weight: 70 kg (154 lb)

Sport
- Sport: water polo
Medal record
Representing Brazil
Pan American Games
Bronze medal – third place	2015 Toronto	Team
Bronze medal – third place	2019 Lima	Team
- Updated on 19 August 2015

Diana Monteiro Abla (born 29 July 1995) is a female water polo player of Brazil.

She was part of the Brazilian team at the 2015 World Aquatics Championships.

== See also ==
- Brazil at the 2015 World Aquatics Championships
