= Water polo at the 2023 Central American and Caribbean Games =

- Venue: Complejo Acuático Ciudad Merliot
- Location: (El Salvador) Ciudad Merliot
- Dates: 1–7 July

The water polo competition at the 2023 Central American and Caribbean Games was held at the Complejo Acuático Ciudad Merliot in Ciudad Merliot, El Salvador from 1 to 7 July.

== Medal table ==
* Host nation (El Salvador)

Rank	Nation	Gold	Silver	Bronze	Total
1	Puerto Rico (PUR)	1	0	0	1
2	Cuba (CUB)	0	1	0	1
3	Mexico (MEX)	0	0	1	1
Totals (3 entries)		1	1	1	3

== Medal summary ==
Event	Gold	Silver	Bronze
Men's tournament	Puerto Rico (PUR); Juan Fradera; Abiel Quinones; Alan Bayo; Jose Loubriel; Diego Zayas; Angel Andino; Fernando Zayas; Gabriel Robles; Angel Rosado; Fabio Mujica; Ian Solano; Jafet Hernandez; Jorge Torres	Cuba (CUB); Arian Ferrer; Ivan Fernandez; Giraldo Carales; Pedro Ponsa; Jorge Cabrera; Danilo Palacio; Carlos Diaz; Alberto Hay; Jose Peralta; Remmy De Armas; Geovanis Zayas; Raydel Martinez; Darian Naya	Mexico (MEX); Angel Cadena; Erick Juarez; Jose Perez; Hazel Vega; Moises Morales; Sinai Gonzalez; Eduardo Arrillaga; Damian Tavera; Diego Mercado; Perseo Ponce; Emiliano Estrada; Miguel Rios; Roberto Barrera
