= 2016 Salford Red Devils season =

- Super League XXI Rank: 10th
- Play-off result: N/A
- Challenge Cup: Sixth Round
- 2016 record: Wins: 11; draws: 0; losses: 14
- Points scored: For: 560; against: 569

Team information
- Chairman: Marwan Koukash
- Head Coach: Ian Watson
- Captain: Tommy Lee
- Stadium: AJ Bell Stadium

Top scorers
- Tries: Josh Griffin – 8
- Goals: Gareth O'Brien – 17
- Points: Josh Griffin – 40
← 2015	List of seasons	2017 →

This article details the Salford Red Devils rugby league football club's 2016 season. This is the Red Devils 8th consecutive season in the Super League and their 3rd season using the Red Devils name.

== Table ==
=== Super League table ===
Pos	Team	Pld	W	D	L	PF	PA	PD	Pts	Qualification
1	Hull F.C.	23	17	0	6	605	465	+140	34	Super League Super 8s
2	Warrington Wolves	23	16	1	6	675	425	+250	33	Super League Super 8s
3	Wigan Warriors	23	16	0	7	455	440	+15	32	Super League Super 8s
4	St Helens	23	14	0	9	573	536	+37	28	Super League Super 8s
5	Catalans Dragons	23	13	0	10	593	505	+88	26	Super League Super 8s
6	Castleford Tigers	23	10	1	12	617	640	−23	21	Super League Super 8s
7	Widnes Vikings	23	10	0	13	499	474	+25	20	Super League Super 8s
8	Wakefield Trinity Wildcats	23	10	0	13	485	654	−169	20	Super League Super 8s
9	Leeds Rhinos	23	8	0	15	404	576	−172	16	The Qualifiers
10	Salford Red Devils	23	10	0	13	560	569	−9	14 (Note: Salford deducted 6 points for salary cap breaches in 2014 and 2015.)	The Qualifiers
11	Hull Kingston Rovers	23	6	2	15	486	610	−124	14	The Qualifiers
12	Huddersfield Giants	23	6	0	17	511	569	−58	12	The Qualifiers

Source: Rugby League Project
Rules for classification: 1) Points; 2) Points difference; 3) Number of points scored;

=== Qualifiers table ===
Pos	Team	Pld	W	D	L	PF	PA	PD	Pts	Qualification
1	Leeds Rhinos	7	6	0	1	239	94	+145	12	2017 Super League
2	Leigh Centurions (P)	7	6	0	1	223	193	+30	12	2017 Super League
3	Huddersfield Giants	7	5	0	2	257	166	+91	10	2017 Super League
4	Hull Kingston Rovers (R)	7	4	0	3	235	142	+93	8	Million Pound Game
5	Salford Red Devils	7	3	0	4	208	152	+56	6	Million Pound Game
6	London Broncos	7	3	0	4	221	212	+9	6	2017 Championship
7	Batley Bulldogs	7	1	0	6	111	318	−207	2	2017 Championship
8	Featherstone Rovers	7	0	0	7	96	313	−217	0	2017 Championship

Source: Rugby League Project
Rules for classification: 1) Points; 2) Points difference; 3) Number of points scored;
(P) Promoted; (R) Relegated

== 2016 fixtures and results ==
LEGEND
Win
Draw
Loss

2016 Super League Fixtures

Date	Competition	Rnd	Vrs	H/A	Venue	Result	Score	Tries	Goals	Att	Live on TV
5/2/16	Super League XXI	1	Hull F.C.	A	KC Stadium	L	20–42	J.Griffin, Sa'u (2), Evalds	J.Griffin 1/2, Dobson 1/1	12,265	–
11/2/16	Super League XXI	2	St. Helens	H	AJ Bell Stadium	W	44–10	Johnson, Kopczak, Lui (2), Evalds (2), A.Walne, Dobson	J.Griffin 2/3, Dobson 4/6	4,386	Sky Sports
21/2/16	Super League XXI	11	Widnes	H	AJ Bell Stadium	W	28–20	Carney, Flanagan (2), Johnson, J.Griffin	Dobson 3/4, O'Brien 1/1	5,089	–
25/2/16	Super League XXI	3	Wigan	A	DW Stadium	L	16–20	Sa'u, J.Griffin, Murdoch-Masila	O'Brien 1/3, J.Griffin 1/1	10,897	–
3/3/16	Super League XXI	4	Warrington	H	AJ Bell Stadium	L	30–31	Sa'u (2), Jones, Johnson, J.Griffin	O'Brien 4/5, Dobson 1/1	4,381	Sky Sports
13/3/16	Super League XXI	5	Castleford	A	The Jungle	W	32–16	Johnson, J.Griffin (2), Carney (2)	O'Brien 6/6	8,151	Sky Sports
20/3/16	Super League XXI	6	Hull Kingston Rovers	A	Craven Park	L	30–44	Kopczak (2), G.Griffin (2), Johnson	O'Brien 5/5	Attendance	–
25/3/16	Super League XXI	7	Catalans Dragons	H	AJ Bell Stadium	L	12–26	J.Griffin, Johnson (2)	O'Brien 0/3	Attendance	–
28/3/16	Super League XXI	8	Huddersfield	A	Galpharm Stadium	W	26–24	Kopczak, O'Brien, J.Griffin, Carney, Evalds	O'Brien 0/2, Dobson 3/4	Attendance	–
2/4/16	Super League XXI	9	Wakefield Trinity	A	Belle Vue	W/D/L	Score	Try Scorers	Goal Scorers	Attendance	Sky Sports

2016 Super 8 Qualifiers

Date	Competition	Rnd	Vrs	H/A	Venue	Result	Score	Tries	Goals	Att	Live on TV
0/0/16	Championship	S1	Team	H/A	Stadium	W/D/L	Score	Try Scorers	Goal Scorers	Attendance	TV
0/0/16	Championship	S2	Team	H/A	Stadium	W/D/L	Score	Try Scorers	Goal Scorers	Attendance	TV
0/0/16	Championship	S3	Team	H/A	Stadium	W/D/L	Score	Try Scorers	Goal Scorers	Attendance	TV
0/0/16	Championship	S4	Team	H/A	Stadium	W/D/L	Score	Try Scorers	Goal Scorers	Attendance	TV
0/0/16	Championship	S5	Team	H/A	Stadium	W/D/L	Score	Try Scorers	Goal Scorers	Attendance	TV
0/0/16	Championship	S6	Team	H/A	Stadium	W/D/L	Score	Try Scorers	Goal Scorers	Attendance	TV
0/0/16	Championship	S7	Team	H/A	Stadium	W/D/L	Score	Try Scorers	Goal Scorers	Attendance	TV

== Player appearances ==
- Super League Only

FB=Fullback	C=Centre	W=Winger	SO=Stand-off	SH=Scrum half	PR=Prop	H=Hooker	SR=Second Row	L=Loose forward	B=Bench

No	Player	1	2	11	3	4	5	6	7	8	9	10	12	13	14	15	16	17	18	19	20	21	22	23	S1	S2	S3	S4	S5	S6	S7
1	Niall Evalds	B	B		B	B		FB		B	x	x	x	x	x	x	x	x	x	x	x	x	x	x	x	x	x	x	x	x	x
2	Justin Carney	W	W	W	W	W	W	W	W	W	x	x	x	x	x	x	x	x	x	x	x	x	x	x	x	x	x	x	x	x	x
3	Josh Griffin	W	C	C	C	C	C	C	C	C	x	x	x	x	x	x	x	x	x	x	x	x	x	x	x	x	x	x	x	x	x
4	Junior Sa'u	C		C	C	C	C	C	C	C	x	x	x	x	x	x	x	x	x	x	x	x	x	x	x	x	x	x	x	x	x
5	Daniel Vidot										x	x	x	x	x	x	x	x	x	x	x	x	x	x	x	x	x	x	x	x	x
6	Robert Lui	SO	SO	SO	SO	SO	SO				x	x	x	x	x	x	x	x	x	x	x	x	x	x	x	x	x	x	x	x	x
7	Michael Dobson	SH	SH	SH	SH	SH	SH	SH	SH	SH	x	x	x	x	x	x	x	x	x	x	x	x	x	x	x	x	x	x	x	x	x
8	Craig Kopczak	P	P	P	P	P	P	P	P	P	x	x	x	x	x	x	x	x	x	x	x	x	x	x	x	x	x	x	x	x	x
9	Tommy Lee	H	H	H	H	H	H	H	SO		x	x	x	x	x	x	x	x	x	x	x	x	x	x	x	x	x	x	x	x	x
10	George Griffin	P	P	P	P	P	P	P	P	P	x	x	x	x	x	x	x	x	x	x	x	x	x	x	x	x	x	x	x	x	x
11	Ben Murdoch-Masila	SR	SR	SR	SR	SR	SR	SR	SR	SR	x	x	x	x	x	x	x	x	x	x	x	x	x	x	x	x	x	x	x	x	x
12	Weller Hauraki										x	x	x	x	x	x	x	x	x	x	x	x	x	x	x	x	x	x	x	x	x
13	Mark Flanagan	L	SR	L	L	L	B	B	B	L	x	x	x	x	x	x	x	x	x	x	x	x	x	x	x	x	x	x	x	x	x
14	Gareth O'Brien	FB	FB	FB	FB	FB	FB	SO	FB	FB	x	x	x	x	x	x	x	x	x	x	x	x	x	x	x	x	x	x	x	x	x
15	Adam Walne	x	B	B		B	B	B	B		x	x	x	x	x	x	x	x	x	x	x	x	x	x	x	x	x	x	x	x	x
16	Olsi Krasniqi	B			B					x	x	x	x	x	x	x	x	x	x	x	x	x	x	x	x	x	x	x	x	x	x
17	Philip Joseph	B	B	B			B	B	B		x	x	x	x	x	x	x	x	x	x	x	x	x	x	x	x	x	x	x	x	x
18	Greg Johnson	x	W	W	W	W	W	W	W		x	x	x	x	x	x	x	x	x	x	x	x	x	x	x	x	x	x	x	x	x
19	Logan Tomkins	B	B	B	B	B	B	B	H	H	x	x	x	x	x	x	x	x	x	x	x	x	x	x	x	x	x	x	x	x	x
20	Jordan Walne	x	x	x	B	B	x	x	x	B	x	x	x	x	x	x	x	x	x	x	x	x	x	x	x	x	x	x	x	x	x
21	Ryan Lannon	x	L	B	x	x	L	L	x	x	x	x	x	x	x	x	x	x	x	x	x	x	x	x	x	x	x	x	x	x	x
22	Matt Sarsfield	SR							B	B	x	x	x	x	x	x	x	x	x	x	x	x	x	x	x	x	x	x	x	x	x
23	Carl Forster	x	x	x	x	x	x	x	L	B	x	x	x	x	x	x	x	x	x	x	x	x	x	x	x	x	x	x	x	x	x
24	Mason Caton-Brown	x	x	x	x	x	x	x	x	W	x	x	x	x	x	x	x	x	x	x	x	x	x	x	x	x	x	x	x	x	x
25	Jake Bibby	x	x	x	x	x	x	x	x	x	x	x	x	x	x	x	x	x	x	x	x	x	x	x	x	x	x	x	x	x	x
26	Josh Wood	x	x	x	x	x	x	x	x	SO	x	x	x	x	x	x	x	x	x	x	x	x	x	x	x	x	x	x	x	x	x
27	Matthew Haggarty	x	x	x	x	x	x	x	x	x	x	x	x	x	x	x	x	x	x	x	x	x	x	x	x	x	x	x	x	x	x
28	Matty Gee	x	x	x	x	x	x	x	x	x	x	x	x	x	x	x	x	x	x	x	x	x	x	x	x	x	x	x	x	x	x
29	Matthew Wilkinson	x	x	x	x	x	x	x	x	x	x	x	x	x	x	x	x	x	x	x	x	x	x	x	x	x	x	x	x	x	x
30	Liam Bent	x	x	x	x	x	x	x	x	x	x	x	x	x	x	x	x	x	x	x	x	x	x	x	x	x	x	x	x	x	x
31	Connor Williams	x	x	x	x	x	x	x	x	x	x	x	x	x	x	x	x	x	x	x	x	x	x	x	x	x	x	x	x	x	x
32	Jordan Andrade	x	x	x	x	x	x	x	x	x	x	x	x	x	x	x	x	x	x	x	x	x	x	x	x	x	x	x	x	x	x
33	Josh Jones	C	C	SR	SR	SR	SR	SR	SR	SR	x	x	x	x	x	x	x	x	x	x	x	x	x	x	x	x	x	x	x	x	x

= Injured

= Suspended

== Challenge Cup ==
LEGEND
Win
Draw
Loss

Date	Competition	Rnd	Vrs	H/A	Venue	Result	Score	Tries	Goals	Att	TV
16-17/4/16	Cup	5th	Hunslet	A	South Leeds Stadium	W/D/L	Score	Try Scorers	Goal Scorers	Attendance	–
0/0/16	Cup	6th	Team	H/A	Stadium	W/D/L	Score	Try Scorers	Goal Scorers	Attendance	TV

== Player appearances ==
- Challenge Cup Games only

FB=Fullback	C=Centre	W=Winger	SO=Stand Off	SH=Scrum half	P=Prop	H=Hooker	SR=Second Row	L=Loose forward	B=Bench

No	Player	5
1	Niall Evalds	x
2	Justin Carney	x
3	Josh Griffin	x
4	Junior Sa'u	x
5	Daniel Vidot	x
6	Robert Lui	x
7	Michael Dobson	x
8	Craig Kopczak	x
9	Tommy Lee	x
10	George Griffin	x
11	Ben Murdoch-Masila	x
12	Weller Hauraki	x
13	Mark Flanagan	x
14	Gareth O'Brien	x
15	Adam Walne	x
16	Olsi Krasniqi	x
17	Philip Joseph	x
18	Greg Johnson	x
19	Logan Tomkins	x
20	Jordan Walne	x
21	Ryan Lannon	x
22	Matt Sarsfield	x
23	Carl Forster	x
24	Mason Caton-Brown	x
25	Jake Bibby	x
26	Josh Wood	x
27	Matthew Haggarty	x
28	Matty Gee	x
29	Matthew Wilkinson	x
30	Liam Bent	x
31	Connor Williams	x
32	Jordan Andrade	x
33	Josh Jones	x

== 2016 squad statistics ==
- Appearances and points include (Super League, Challenge Cup and Play-offs) as of 28 March 2016.

No	Player	Position	Age	Previous club	Apps	Tries	Goals	DG	Points
1	Niall Evalds	Fullback	N/A	Salford Red Devils Academy	6	4	0	0	16
2	Justin Carney	Winger	N/A	Castleford Tigers	9	4	0	0	16
3	Josh Griffin	Centre	N/A	Batley Bulldogs	9	8	4	0	40
4	Junior Sa'u	Centre	N/A	Melbourne Storm	8	5	0	0	20
5	Daniel Vidot	Wing	N/A	Brisbane Broncos	0	0	0	0	0
6	Robert Lui	Stand off	N/A	North Queensland Cowboys	6	2	0	0	8
7	Michael Dobson	Scrum half	N/A	Newcastle Knights	9	1	12	0	28
8	Craig Kopczak	Prop	N/A	Huddersfield Giants	9	4	0	0	16
9	Tommy Lee	Hooker	N/A	London Broncos	8	0	0	0	0
10	George Griffin	Prop	N/A	London Broncos	9	2	0	0	8
11	Ben Murdoch-Masila	Second-row	N/A	Penrith Panthers	9	1	0	0	4
12	Weller Hauraki	Second-row	N/A	Castleford Tigers	0	0	0	0	0
13	Mark Flanagan	Loose forward	N/A	St Helens R.F.C.	9	2	0	0	8
14	Gareth O'Brien	Scrum half	N/A	Warrington Wolves	9	1	17	0	38
15	Adam Walne	Prop	N/A	Salford Red Devils Academy	6	1	0	0	4
16	Olsi Krasniqi	Prop	N/A	London Broncos	2	0	0	0	0
17	Philip Joseph	Prop	N/A	Widnes Vikings	6	0	0	0	0
18	Greg Johnson	Wing	N/A	Batley Bulldogs	7	7	0	0	28
19	Logan Tomkins	Hooker	N/A	Wigan Warriors	9	0	0	0	0
20	Jordan Walne	Prop	N/A	Salford Red Devils Academy	3	0	0	0	0
21	Ryan Lannon	Prop	N/A	Salford Red Devils Academy	4	0	0	0	0
22	Matt Sarsfield	Second row	N/A	Leigh Centurions	3	0	0	0	0
23	Carl Forster	Second-row	N/A	St Helens R.F.C.	2	0	0	0	0
24	Mason Caton-Brown	Centre	N/A	London Broncos	1	0	0	0	0
25	Jake Bibby	Centre	N/A	Salford Red Devils Academy	0	0	0	0	0
26	Josh Wood	Scrum half	N/A	Salford Red Devils Academy	1	0	0	0	0
27	Matthew Haggarty	Prop	N/A	St Helens R.F.C. (Loan)	0	0	0	0	0
28	Matty Gee	Centre	N/A	Salford Red Devils Academy	0	0	0	0	0
29	Matthew Wilkinson	Stand off	N/A	Salford Red Devils Academy	0	0	0	0	0
30	Liam Bent	Prop	N/A	Salford Red Devils Academy	0	0	0	0	0
31	Connor Williams	Loose forward	N/A	Salford Red Devils Academy	0	0	0	0	0
32	Jordan Andrade	Prop	N/A	Oxford Rugby League (Loan)	0	0	0	0	0
33	Josh Jones	Centre	N/A	Exeter Chiefs (RU)	9	1	0	0	4

= Injured = Suspended

== 2016 transfers in/out ==
In

Nat	Name	Moved from	Contract Length	Announced
(England)	Mark Flanagan	St. Helens	2 Years	October 2015
(England)	Gareth O'Brien	Warrington Wolves	2 Years	October 2015
(Wales)	Craig Kopczak	Huddersfield Giants	1 Year	October 2015
(Wales)	Phil Joseph	Widnes Vikings	1 Year	October 2015
(Australia)	Robert Lui	North Queensland Cowboys	1 Year	October 2015
(Tonga)	Ben Murdoch-Masila	Penrith Panthers	1 Year	October 2015
(Republic of Ireland)	Matt Haggarty	St. Helens	1 Year Loan	October 2015
(Australia)	Justin Carney	Castleford Tigers	1 Year Loan	November 2015
(Samoa)	Daniel Vidot	Brisbane Broncos	2 Years	November 2015
(England)	Logan Tomkins	Wigan Warriors	1 Year	November 2015
(Scotland)	Matt Sarsfield	Leigh Centurions	1 Year	December 2015
(England)	Jordan Andrade	Oxford Rugby League	1 Year	December 2015
(England)	Josh Jones	Exeter Chiefs	1 Year	January 2016

Out

Nat	Name	Moved To	Contract Length	Announced
(New Zealand)	Kevin Locke	Released	TBC	May 2015
(England)	Scott Taylor	Hull F.C.	4 Years	May 2015
(Samoa)	Lama Tasi	St. Helens	2 Years	May 2015
(England)	Iain Thornley	Hull Kingston Rovers	2 Years	August 2015
(England)	Adrian Morley	Retire	N/A	September 2015
(France)	Théo Fages	St. Helens	4 Years	September 2015
(Australia)	Corey Paterson	Leigh Centurions	3 Years	September 2015
(Samoa)	Reni Maitua	Leigh Centurions	1 Year	September 2015
(England)	Logan Tomkins	Wigan Warriors	Loan return	October 2015
(Samoa)	Harrison Hansen	Leigh Centurions	2 Years	October 2015
(England)	Jason Walton	Wakefield Trinity Wildcats	2 Years	November 2015
(England)	Jon Ford	Oldham R.L.F.C.	1 Year	November 2015
(England)	Ben Jones-Bishop	Wakefield Trinity Wildcats	1 Year	November 2015
(England)	Darrell Griffin	Featherstone Rovers	2 Years	November 2015
(England)	Rangi Chase	Leigh Centurions	2 Years	November 2015
(Scotland)	Liam Hood	Swinton Lions	1 Year	January 2016
(England)	Carl Forster	Swinton Lions	1 Month Loan	January 2016
(England)	Brad England	Released
(England)	Luke Menzies	Released
(Samoa)	Tony Puletua	Released
