= 2015 Salford Red Devils season =

- Super League XX Rank: 11th
- Play-off result: 3rd - Super Eight's
- Challenge Cup: 5th Round
- 2015 record: Wins: 13; draws: 1; losses: 17
- Points scored: For: 704; against: 842

Team information
- Chairman: Marwan Koukash
- Head Coach: Iestyn Harris
- Captain: Harrison Hansen
- Stadium: AJ Bell Stadium

Top scorers
- Tries: Niall Evalds - 19
- Goals: Josh Griffin - 54
- Points: Josh Griffin - 152
← 2014	List of seasons	2016 →

This article details the Salford Red Devils rugby league football club's 2015 season. This is the club's 7th consecutive season in the Super League and their 2nd season using the Salford Red Devils name.

== Pre season friendlies ==
LEGEND
Win
Draw
Loss

Salford score is first.

Date	Competition	Vrs	H/A	Venue	Result	Score	Tries	Goals	Att
17/1/15	Pre Season	Team	H/A	Stadium	W/D/L	Score	Try Scorers	Goal Kickers	Attendance
24/1/15	Pre Season	Team	H/A	Stadium	W/D/L	Score	Try Scorers	Goal Kickers	Attendance

== Table ==
=== Super League ===
Pos	Team	Pld	W	D	L	PF	PA	PD	Pts	Qualification
1	Leeds Rhinos	23	16	1	6	758	477	+281	33	Super League Super 8s
2	St Helens	23	16	0	7	598	436	+162	32	Super League Super 8s
3	Wigan Warriors	23	15	1	7	589	413	+176	31	Super League Super 8s
4	Huddersfield Giants	23	13	2	8	538	394	+144	28	Super League Super 8s
5	Castleford Tigers	23	13	0	10	547	505	+42	26	Super League Super 8s
6	Warrington Wolves	23	12	0	11	552	456	+96	24	Super League Super 8s
7	Hull F.C.	23	11	0	12	452	484	−32	22	Super League Super 8s
8	Catalans Dragons	23	9	2	12	561	574	−13	20	Super League Super 8s
9	Widnes Vikings	23	9	1	13	518	565	−47	19	The Qualifiers
10	Hull Kingston Rovers	23	9	0	14	534	646	−112	18	The Qualifiers
11	Salford Red Devils	23	8	1	14	447	617	−170	17	The Qualifiers
12	Wakefield Trinity Wildcats	23	3	0	20	402	929	−527	6	The Qualifiers

Source: Rugby League Project
Rules for classification: 1) Points; 2) Points difference; 3) Number of points scored;

=== Qualifiers ===
Pos	Team	Pld	W	D	L	PF	PA	PD	Pts	Qualification
1	Hull Kingston Rovers	7	7	0	0	234	118	+116	14	2016 Super League
2	Widnes Vikings	7	5	0	2	232	70	+162	10	2016 Super League
3	Salford Red Devils	7	5	0	2	239	203	+36	10	2016 Super League
4	Wakefield Trinity Wildcats (W)	7	3	0	4	153	170	−17	6	Million Pound Game
5	Bradford Bulls	7	3	0	4	167	240	−73	6	Million Pound Game
6	Halifax	7	2	0	5	162	186	−24	4	2016 Championship
7	Sheffield Eagles	7	2	0	5	152	267	−115	4	2016 Championship
8	Leigh Centurions	7	1	0	6	146	231	−85	2	2016 Championship

Source: Rugby League Project
Rules for classification: 1) Points; 2) Points difference; 3) Number of points scored;
(W) Million Pound Game Winner

== 2015 fixtures and results ==
LEGEND
Win
Draw
Loss

2015 Super League Fixtures

Date	Competition	Rnd	Vrs	H/A	Venue	Result	Score	Tries	Goals	Att	Live on TV
7/2/15	Super League XX	1	Warrington	A	Halliwell Jones Stadium	L	8-22	Jones-Bishop (2)	J.Griffin 0/1, Dobson 0/1	11,864	-
12/2/15	Super League XX	2	St. Helens	H	AJ Bell Stadium	L	6-52	Jones-Bishop	Dobson 1/1	4,975	Sky Sports
28/2/15	Super League XX	3	Hull F.C.	H	AJ Bell Stadium	W	32-28	Evalds (2), Fages, J.Griffin (2), Sa'u	J.Griffin 4/6	3,606	-
7/3/15	Super League XX	4	Catalans Dragons	A	Stade Gilbert Brutus	D	40-40	Sa'u, J.Griffin, Paterson (2), Lee, Fages, Chase	J.Griffin 6/8	7,800	Sky Sports
15/3/15	Super League XX	5	Wakefield Trinity	H	AJ Bell Stadium	W	24-18	Johnson, Hauraki, Chase, Sa'u	J.Griffin 4/4	2,712	-
20/3/15	Super League XX	6	Castleford	A	The Jungle	L	16-30	Lee, Hauraki, Jones-Bishop	J.Griffin 2/3	6,901	-
26/3/15	Super League XX	7	Widnes	H	AJ Bell Stadium	W	36-8	Jones-Bishop, Hauraki, Johnson, Tasi, J.Griffin, Paterson, Taylor	J.Griffin 4/7	3,476	Sky Sports
3/4/15	Super League XX	8	Huddersfield	A	Galpharm Stadium	W	18-12	J.Griffin, Jones-Bishop, Forster	J.Griffin 3/3	6,003	-
6/4/15	Super League XX	9	Wigan	H	AJ Bell Stadium	W	24-18	Evalds (2), Dobson, Jones-Bishop	J.Griffin 4/4	6,561	-
12/4/15	Super League XX	10	Leeds	H	AJ Bell Stadium	L	18-28	Tasi, Evalds (2)	Dobson 3/3	4,000	-
26/4/15	Super League XX	12	Castleford	H	AJ Bell Stadium	L	20-22	Fages, Locke (2), Taylor	Locke 1/3, Johnson 1/1	2,800	-
1/5/15	Super League XX	13	Hull F.C.	A	KC Stadium	L	20-24	Locke, Greenwood, Gildart	Fages 4/4	9,385	-
8/5/15	Super League XX	14	Huddersfield	H	AJ Bell Stadium	L	0-19	-	-	Attendance	-
22/5/15	Super League XX	15	Warrington	H	AJ Bell Stadium	L	18-34	Paterson, Sa'u, Evalds	Paterson 3/3	6,159	-
30/5/15	Magic Weekend	16	Widnes	N	St James' Park	L	16-38	Paterson, Johnson, Jones-Bishop	J.Griffin 2/3	40,871	Sky Sports
5/6/15	Super League XX	17	St. Helens	A	Langtree Park	L	12-32	Evalds, Chase	Paterson 2/2	11,664	-
14/6/15	Super League XX	18	Wakefield Trinity	A	Belle Vue	W	24-16	Fages, Taylor, Hansen (2)	J.Griffin 4/4	3,240	-
19/6/15	Super League XX	19	Wigan	A	DW Stadium	L	12-19	Paterson, G.Griffin	J.Griffin 2/2	13,710	-
30/6/15	Super League XX	11	Hull Kingston Rovers	A	Craven Park	L	28-34	Caton-Brown, Jones-Bishop (2), J.Walne, Taylor	J.Griffin 4/5	6,717	-
5/7/15	Super League XX	20	Catalans Dragons	H	AJ Bell Stadium	W	18-14	Evalds, Dobson (2)	J.Griffin 3/3	5,078	-
12/7/15	Super League XX	21	Hull Kingston Rovers	H	AJ Bell Stadium	W	31-18	Jones-Bishop (2), J.Griffin, Hauraki, Fages, Evalds	J.Griffin 0/2, Dobson 3/4, Dobson 1 DG	4,500	-
17/7/15	Super League XX	22	Leeds	A	Headingley Stadium	L	6-70	Evalds	Paterson 1/1	14,190	-
26/7/15	Super League XX	23	Widnes	A	Halton Stadium	L	20-21	Evalds, Paterson, Taylor	J.Griffin 4/4	5,479	-

2015 Super 8 Qualifiers

Date	Competition	Rnd	Vrs	H/A	Venue	Result	Score	Tries	Goals	Att	Live on TV
9/8/15	Championship	S1	Wakefield Trinity	H	AJ Bell Stadium	W	34-26	J.Griffin (2), G.Griffin, Paterson (2), Chase	J.Griffin 4/5, Paterson 1/1	3,400	-
16/8/15	Championship	S2	Leigh	H	AJ Bell Stadium	W	46-18	Jones-Bishop, Taylor, Thornley, Chase (2), Sa'u, Evalds, Johnson	Dobson 7/8	4,547	-
23/8/15	Championship	S3	Bradford	A	Odsal Stadium	L	10-41	Chase, Thornley	Dobson 1/2	6,593	-
5/9/15	Championship	S4	Halifax	A	Shay Stadium	W	50-28	Evalds (3), Johnson (3), Jones-Bishop (3)	Dobson 3/3, J.Griffin 4/6	2,186	-
13/9/15	Championship	S5	Sheffield	H	AJ Bell Stadium	W	53-34	Hauraki, Hansen, J.Griffin (2), Hood, Tasi, Evalds, Thornley, G.Griffin	Dobson 8/9, Dobson 1 DG	3,000	-
20/9/15	Championship	S6	Widnes	A	Halton Stadium	W	24-10	J.Griffin, Taylor, Paterson, Sa'u	Dobson 4/4	3,876	-
27/9/15	Championship	S7	Hull Kingston Rovers	A	Craven Park	L	22-46	Johnson, Hansen, Tasi, Lannon	Jones-Bishop 3/3	7,543	-

== Player appearances ==
- Super League Only

FB=Fullback	C=Centre	W=Winger	SO=Stand-off	SH=Scrum half	PR=Prop	H=Hooker	SR=Second Row	L=Loose forward	B=Bench

No	Player	1	2	3	4	5	6	7	8	9	10	12	13	14	15	16	17	18	19	11	20	21	22	23	S1	S2	S3	S4	S5	S6	S7
1	Kevin Locke		FB		FB	FB		FB	FB			W	W							x	x	x	x	x	x	x	x	x	x	x	x
2	Ben Jones-Bishop	W	W			W	W	W	W	W	W			W	W	W	W			W	W	W	W	W	FB	W	W	W	W	W	W
3	Josh Griffin	C	C	C	W	C	C	C	C	C						C	Red card	C	C	C	C	C	C	C	W			C	C	W	x
4	Junior Sa'u			C	C	C	C		C	C	C				C	C	C	C	C	C	C	C	C	C	C	C	C			C	C
5	Greg Johnson	W	W	W	W	W	W	W	W	W	W	W	W	W	W	W	W	W	W					W	W	W	W	W	W		W
6	Rangi Chase	SO	SO	SO	SO	SO	SO	SO	SO	SO	Red card	Red card	Red card	Red card			SO	SO	FB	FB				SO	SO	SO	SO				
7	Michael Dobson	B	SH			SH	SH	SH	SH	SH	SH								SH	SH	SH	SH	SH	SH	SH	SH	SH	SH	SH	SH	x
8	Adrian Morley	B		B	B	P	P	P	P	P	P	B		B	B	B	P	P	P	P		P	P	B	B	B	L		B	B	B
9	Tommy Lee	H	H	H	H	H	H	H	H	H															B	B	B	SO	SO	SO	SH
10	Lama Tasi	x	B	P	P	B	B	B	B	B	B	P	P	B					B	B						B	P		B	P	P
11	Harrison Hansen	SR	SR	SR	SR	SR	SR	SR	SR	SR	SR	SR	SR	L	L	SR	B	L	L	L	SR		B	SR	SR	SR		SR	SR	SR	SR
12	Weller Hauraki	SR		SR	SR	SR	SR	SR	SR	SR				SR	SR	SH	SR		SR		SR	SR	SR				SR		L		
13	Gareth Hock	P	P	x	x	x	x	x	x	x	x	x	x	x	x	x	x	x	x	x	x	x	x	x	x	x	x	x	x	x	x
14	Theo Fages	SH	B	SH	SH	B	B				SO	SO	SO	SO	SO	SO	SH	SH	SO	SO	SO	SO	SO		x	x	x	x	x	x	x
15	Darrell Griffin	B	B	B	B	B	B	B	B	B	B		B	P		P	B	B			B	B	B								
16	Scott Taylor	P	P	P	P	P	P	P	P	P	P	P	P	P	P	P	P	P	P	P	P	P	P	P	P	P	P	P	P	P	x
17	Jordan Walne	x	SR	L	L	L	L						H	SR	H	H	B	SR	B	SR	B	SR	B	L				B			
18	Mason Caton-Brown	C	C	W	x	x	x	C	x	x	C	C	C	C			C	W	W	W	W	W	W								
19	Niall Evalds	FB	x	FB	x	x	FB	x	x	FB	FB	FB	FB	FB	FB	FB	FB	FB	B		FB	FB	FB	FB	B	FB	FB	FB	FB	FB	FB
20	Adam Walne	B	B	B	B	x	x	x	x	x	x	x	x	B	P			x	x	B	P									B	P
21	Tony Puletua																		x	x	x	x	x	x	x	x	x	x	x	x	x
22	Jason Walton	x	x	x	x	B	B	x	x	x	SR	x	SH		C	B	x	B	x	x	x	x	x	x	x	x	x	x	x	x	x
23	Andrew Dixon	x	x	x	x	x	x	x	x	x	x	x	x	x	x	x	x	x	x	x	x	x	x	x	x	x	x	x	x	x	x
24	Liam Hood	x	x	B	B	x	x	B	B	B	H	B	B	B	B	B	H	B		B	B	B	B	B				B	B	B	B
25	George Griffin	x	x	x	x	x	x	x	x	x	x	SH	SR	SH	B	L	L	B	B	B	L	L	L	P	P	P	SR	P	P		
26	Carl Forster	x	x	x	x	x	x	B	B	B	L	SR	L	x	B	B	x	x	x	x	x	x	x	B	x	x	B	B	B	x	x
27	Luke Menzies	x	x	x	x	x	x	x	x	x	x	x	x	x	x	x	x	x	x	x	x	x	x	x	x	x	x	x	x	x	B
28	Johnathon Ford	x	x	x	x	x	x	x	x	x	x	x	x	x	x	x	x	x	x	x	x	x	x	x	x	x	x	x	x	x	x
29	Brad England	x	x	x	x	x	x	x	x	x	x	x	x	x	x	x	x	x	x	x	x	x	x	x	x	x	x	x	x	x	x
30	Matty Gee	x	x	x	x	x	x	x	x	x	B	B	x	x	x	x	x	x	x	x	x	x	x	x	x	x	x	x	x	x	x
31	Cory Paterson	L	L	x	C			L	L	L					SR	SR	SR	SR	SR	SR		B	SR	SR	L	L	B	L		B	
32	Ryan Lannon	x	x	x	x	x	x	x	x	x	B	B	B	x	x	x	x	x	x	x	x	x	x	x	x	x	x	x	x	x	B
33	Wayne Godwin	x	x	x	x	x	x	x	x	x	x	H	x	H	x	x	x	x	x	x	x	x	x	x	x	x	x	x	x	x	x
34	Oliver Gildart	x	x	x	x	x	x	x	x	x	x	C	C	C	x	x	x	x	x	x	x	x	x	x	x	x	x	x	x	x	x
35	James Greenwood	x	x	x	x	x	x	x	x	x	x	L	B	x	x	x	x	x	x	x	x	x	x	x	x	x	x	x	x	x	x
36	Josh Wood	x	x	x	x	x	x	x	x	x	x	x	x	x	SH	x	x	x	x	x	x	x	x	x	x	x	x	x	x	x	SO
37	Logan Tomkins	x	x	x	x	x	x	x	x	x	x	x	x	x	x	x	B	H	H	H	H	H	H	H	H	H	H	H	H	H	H
38	Olsi Krasniqi	x	x	x	x	x	x	x	x	x	x	x	x	x	x	x	x	x	x	x	B	B		B	B	B	B	B		L	L
39	Jake Bibby	x	x	x	x	x	x	x	x	x	x	x	x	x	x	x	x	x	x	x	x	x	x	x	x	x	x	x	x	x	C
40	Reni Maitua	x	x	x	x	x	x	x	x	x	x	x	x	x	x	x	x	x	x	x	x	x	x	x	SR	SR	x	SR	SR	SR	SR
41	Ian Thornley	x	x	x	x	x	x	x	x	x	x	x	x	x	x	x	x	x	x	x	x	x	x	x	C	C	C	C	C	C	

= Injured

= Suspended

== Challenge Cup ==
LEGEND
Win
Draw
Loss

Date	Competition	Rnd	Vrs	H/A	Venue	Result	Score	Tries	Goals	Att	TV
18/4/15	Cup	5th	Leigh	A	Leigh Sports Village	L	18-22	Fages, Evalds (2)	Dobson 1/1, Paterson 2/2	6,358	BBC Sport

== Player appearances ==
- Challenge Cup Games only

FB=Fullback	C=Centre	W=Winger	SO=Stand Off	SH=Scrum half	P=Prop	H=Hooker	SR=Second Row	L=Loose forward	B=Bench

No	Player	5
1	Kevin Locke	
2	Ben Jones-Bishop	W
3	Josh Griffin	
4	Junior Sa'u	C
5	Greg Johnson	W
6	Rangi Chase	Red card
7	Michael Dobson	SH
8	Adrian Morley	P
9	Tommy Lee	
10	Lama Tasi	B
11	Harrison Hansen	SR
12	Weller Hauraki	
14	Theo Fages	SO
15	Darrell Griffin	B
16	Scott Taylor	P
17	Jordan Walne	
18	Mason Caton-Brown	C
19	Niall Evalds	FB
20	Adam Walne	x
21	Tony Puletua	x
22	Jason Walton	x
23	Andrew Dixon	x
24	Liam Hood	B
25	George Griffin	B
26	Carl Forster	L
27	Luke Menzies	x
28	Jonathan Ford	x
29	Brad England	x
30	Matty Gee	x
31	Cory Paterson	SR
32	Ryan Lannon	x
33	Wayne Godwin	H

== 2015 squad statistics ==
- Appearances and points include (Super League, Challenge Cup and Play-offs) as of 27 September 2015.

No	Player	Position	Age	Previous club	Apps	Tries	Goals	DG	Points
1	Kevin Locke	Fullback	N/A	New Zealand Warriors	7	3	1	0	14
2	Ben Jones-Bishop	Winger	N/A	Leeds Rhinos	25	16	3	0	70
3	Josh Griffin	Centre	N/A	Batley Bulldogs	21	11	54	0	152
4	Junior Sa'u	Centre	N/A	Melbourne Storm	23	6	0	0	24
5	Greg Johnson	Wing	N/A	Batley Bulldogs	26	8	1	0	34
6	Rangi Chase	Stand off	N/A	Castleford Tigers	17	7	0	0	28
7	Michael Dobson	Scrum half	N/A	Newcastle Knights	21	3	31	2	76
8	Adrian Morley	Prop	N/A	Warrington Wolves	27	0	0	0	0
9	Tommy Lee	Hooker	N/A	London Broncos	16	2	0	0	8
10	Lama Tasi	Prop	N/A	Brisbane Broncos	20	4	0	0	16
11	Harrison Hansen	Second-row	N/A	Wigan Warriors	29	4	0	0	16
12	Weller Hauraki	Second-row	N/A	Castleford Tigers	18	5	0	0	20
13	Gareth Hock	Loose forward	N/A	Wigan Warriors	2	0	0	0	0
14	Theo Fages	Scrum half	N/A	Salford Red Devils Academy	20	6	4	0	32
15	Darrell Griffin	Prop	N/A	Leeds Rhinos	19	0	0	0	0
16	Scott Taylor	Prop	N/A	Wigan Warriors	30	7	0	0	28
17	Jordan Walne	Prop	N/A	Salford Red Devils Academy	18	1	0	0	4
18	Mason Caton-Brown	Centre	N/A	London Broncos	16	1	0	0	4
19	Niall Evalds	Fullback	N/A	Salford Red Devils Academy	25	19	0	0	76
20	Adam Walne	Prop	N/A	Salford Red Devils Academy	10	0	0	0	0
21	Tony Puletua	Prop	N/A	St Helens R.F.C.	0	0	0	0	0
22	Jason Walton	Centre	N/A	Batley Bulldogs	7	0	0	0	0
23	Andrew Dixon	Second-row	N/A	St Helens R.F.C.	0	0	0	0	0
24	Liam Hood	Hooker	N/A	Hunslet Hawks	23	1	0	0	4
25	George Griffin	Second-row	N/A	London Broncos	19	3	0	0	12
26	Carl Forster	Prop	N/A	St Helens R.F.C.	13	1	0	0	4
27	Luke Menzies	Prop	N/A	Swinton Lions	1	0	0	0	0
28	Johnathon Ford	Stand off	N/A	Salford Red Devils Academy	0	0	0	0	0
29	Brad England	Hooker	N/A	Leeds Rhinos	0	0	0	0	0
30	Matty Gee	Centre	N/A	Salford Red Devils Academy	2	0	0	0	0
31	Cory Paterson	Loose forward	N/A	Hull Kingston Rovers	21	10	9	0	58
32	Ryan Lannon	Loose forward	N/A	Salford Red Devils Academy	4	1	0	0	4
33	Wayne Godwin	Hooker	N/A	Dewsbury Rams (Loan)	3	0	0	0	0
34	Oliver Gildart	Centre	N/A	Wigan Warriors (Loan)	3	1	0	0	4
35	James Greenwood	Loose forward	N/A	Wigan Warriors (Loan)	2	1	0	0	4
36	Josh Wood	Scrum half	N/A	Salford Red Devils Academy	2	0	0	0	0
37	Logan Tomkins	Hooker	N/A	Wigan Warriors (Loan)	15	0	0	0	0
38	Olsi Krasniqi	Prop	N/A	London Broncos	9	0	0	0	0
39	Jake Bibby	Second row	N/A	Salford Red Devils Academy	1	0	0	0	0
40	Reni Maitua	Second row	N/A	Featherstone Rovers	6	0	0	0	0
41	Ian Thornley	Centre	N/A	Wigan Warriors	6	3	0	0	12

= Injured = Suspended

== 2015 transfers in/out ==
In

Nat	Name	Signed from	Contract Length	Date
(England)	Ben Jones Bishop	Leeds Rhinos	3 Years	May 2014
(New Zealand)	Kevin Locke	New Zealand Warriors	3 ½ Years	May 2014
(Australia)	Michael Dobson	Newcastle Knights	4 Years	June 2014
(England)	Mason Caton-Brown	London Broncos	2 ½ Years	July 2014
(New Zealand)	Weller Hauraki	Castleford Tigers	3 Years	July 2014
(England)	Josh Griffin	Batley Bulldogs	2 ½ Years	August 2014
(England)	Liam Hood	Hunslet Hawks	1 Year	August 2014
(England)	Luke Menzies	Swinton Lions	2 Years	September 2014
(Australia)	Matt Groat †	St. George Illawarra Dragons	1 Year	September 2014
(England)	Brad England	Leeds Rhinos	1 Year	September 2014
(England)	Carl Forster	St. Helens	1 Year	September 2014
(England)	Jon Ford	Sheffield Eagles	Loan return	September 2014
(England)	Scott Taylor	Wigan Warriors	1 Year Loan	November 2014
(Australia)	Cory Paterson	Wests Tigers	1 Year	November 2014

† = Matt Groat originally signed a 1-year deal, however, had to cancel it.

Out

Nat	Name	Sold To	Contract Length	Date
(England)	Jacob Emmitt	Leigh Centurions	1 ½ Years	June 2014
(Republic of Ireland)	Marc Sneyd	Hull F.C.	3 Years	June 2014
(Republic of Ireland)	Michael Platt	Leigh Centurions	2 ½ Years	July 2014
(Australia)	Jake Mullaney	Bradford Bulls	1 Year	July 2014
(England)	Matty Ashurst	Wakefield Trinity Wildcats	2 Years	August 2014
(England)	Danny Williams	Bradford Bulls	2 Years	September 2014
(Australia)	Shannan McPherson	Parramatta Eels	1 Year	September 2014
(England)	Logan Tomkins	Wigan Warriors	Loan return	September 2014
(England)	Martin Gleeson	Retired - Academy Coach	N/A	October 2014
(New Zealand)	Francis Meli	Retired	N/A	October 2014
(Australia)	Tim Smith	Wakefield Trinity Wildcats	1 Year	October 2014
(England)	Alex Davidson	North Wales Crusaders	2 Years	November 2014
(England)	Gareth Owen	Oldham R.L.F.C.	1 Year	November 2014
(England)	George Tyson	Oldham R.L.F.C.	1 Year	November 2014
(England)	Jack Holmes	Oldham R.L.F.C.	2 Years	November 2014
(England)	Stuart Howarth	Hull F.C.	1 Year	January 2015
(England)	Andrew Dixon	Halifax	1 Month	January 2015
(England)	Jordan Davies
(England)	Will Hope
(New Zealand)	Steve Rapira
