= Liam Hood =

Scotland international rugby league footballer

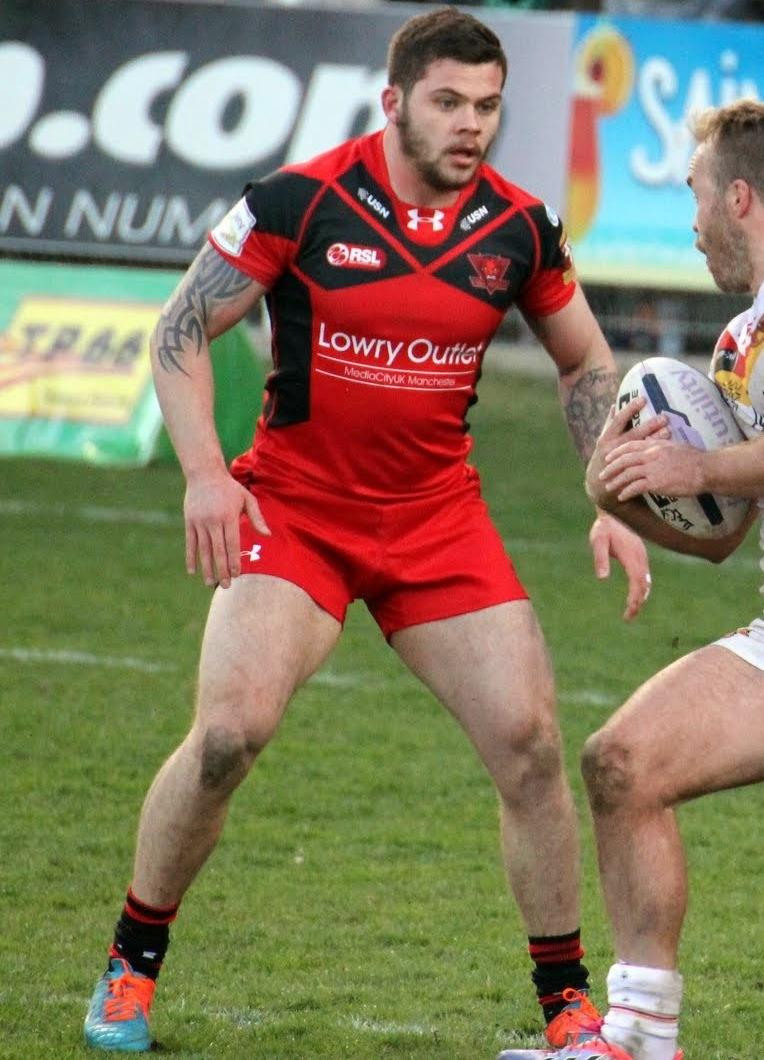

Personal information
- Full name: Liam Hood
- Born: 6 January 1992 (age 34) Bradford, West Yorkshire, England
- Height: 5 ft 9 in (1.75 m)
- Weight: 12 st 6 lb (79 kg)

Playing information
- Position: Hooker
Club
Years	Team	Pld	T	G	FG	P
2012–13	Leeds Rhinos	5	3	0	0	12
2012(loan)	→ Dewsbury Rams	12	2	0	0	8
2013(loan)	→ Hunslet Hawks	19	5	0	0	20
2014	Hunslet Hawks	17	13	0	0	52
2015	Salford Red Devils	22	1	0	0	4
2016	Swinton Lions	4	0	0	0	0
2016–18	Leigh Centurions	65	26	0	0	104
2019	Widnes Vikings	4	2	0	0	8
2019–21	Leigh Centurions	51	15	0	0	60
2022–25	Wakefield Trinity	98	25	0	0	100
2026–	Castleford Tigers	17	4	0	0	16
	Total	314	96	0	0	384
Representative
Years	Team	Pld	T	G	FG	P
2012–	Scotland	10	1	0	0	4
- Source: As of 12 September 2026

Liam Hood (born 6 January 1992) is a Scotland international rugby league footballer who plays as a hooker for the Castleford Tigers in the Super League.

He began his career with the Leeds Rhinos in the Super League, where he also spent time on loan at the Dewsbury Rams and the Hunslet Hawks in the Championship and Championship 1. After a season with the Salford Red Devils in the Super League, and a short stay at Swinton in the Championship, Hood joined the Leigh Centurions. Here he spent six years in the top two divisions, across two spells, separated by a brief stint with the Widnes Vikings. He later played for Wakefield Trinity for four years before joining Castleford in 2026.

== Background ==
Hood was born in Bradford, West Yorkshire, England.

Having progressed through the Leeds Rhinos academy system, Hood was promoted to the first-team squad prior to the 2012 season.

== Career ==
=== Leeds Rhinos ===
In September 2011, Hood signed a four-year contract with Leeds alongside fellow hooker Paul McShane. He made his Super League debut on 2 March 2012 against Castleford, scoring a late try. Later on in the season, he was loaned to Dewsbury where he made twelve appearances, scoring twice.

He was granted a release from Leeds in September 2013, seeking further game time.

=== Hunslet Hawks ===
In 2013, Hood played for Hunslet in the RFL Championship through their dual registration arrangement with Leeds. Although they suffered relegation to the Championship 1, he signed a one-year deal to join the club on a permanent basis in 2014. Across two seasons, he made thirty-six appearances and scored eighteen tries.

=== Salford Red Devils ===
In August 2014, Hood agreed a two-year deal to join Salford from the 2015 season. He made twenty-two appearances, scoring one try. He was one of several Salford players to be released at the end of 2015.

=== Swinton Lions ===
After leaving Salford, Hood pulled out of a proposed move to join Burdekin Roosters in the Townsville District Rugby League in Australia. He instead joined Swinton Lions in the Championship for 2016, though made only four appearances before departing in March.

=== Leigh Centurions ===
In March 2016, Leigh Centurions announced the signing of Hood on a two-year deal from Championship rivals Swinton. He made nineteen appearances and scored four tries as the Centurions won promotion to the top flight via the Super 8s.

On 8 June 2017, Hood scored two tries from dummy-half as Leigh recorded their first win against rivals Wigan in 33 years. He played in the 2017 Million Pound Game defeat to Catalans Dragons. In October, Hood signed a new two-year deal to remain with Leigh as they returned to the Championship.

Hood scored seventeen tries in twenty-two appearances throughout 2018, including braces against Toulouse, London, and Halifax.

=== Widnes Vikings ===
In October 2018, Hood signed for Widnes Vikings on a one-year contract ahead of their 2019 season in the Championship. He registered just four appearances, scoring two tries, before being granted a release for personal reasons after the club entered administration.

=== Return to Leigh Centurions ===
Shortly following his Widnes exit, Hood rejoined Leigh in March 2019, this time on a part-time basis.

Hood was named Leigh vice-captain for the 2020 season, and had scored five tries in six games at the time of the Championship's suspension due to COVID-19. In August 2020, Hood signed a new contract with Leigh, committing to the club for the 2021 season.

Hood was appointed Leigh captain for the 2021 campaign on their return to Super League.

=== Wakefield Trinity ===
On 17 August 2021, Hood signed for Wakefield Trinity on a two-year deal from the 2022 Super League season.

Hood signed a one-year contract extension with Wakefield in January 2023. He made twenty-one appearances for Wakefield Trinity in 2023 as the club finished bottom of the table and were relegated, ending their 24-year stay in the top flight.

In October 2023, he became the first player to commit to Wakefield's new regime in the Championship by agreeing a new contract. He made twenty-nine appearances and scored twelve tries in their promotion campaign.

Head coach Daryl Powell praised Hood's strong form in the opening months of the 2025 season, though said he was unlikely to be retained due to salary cap management.

=== Castleford Tigers ===
On 2 October 2025, Castleford Tigers announced the signing of Hood on a one-year deal with the option of a further year. He was assigned squad number 9 for the 2026 season. He made his debut against Doncaster in the Challenge Cup, and scored his first try in round 1 against Wigan Warriors. In March, he underwent surgery for an ongoing knee injury and missed three matches. On return in April, Hood sustained a significant neck injury in the first half of Castleford's round 8 win against Wigan; he completed the full match without reporting any symptoms, however was hospitalised the following morning and ruled out of action for twelve weeks. Despite initial fears he may be forced to retire, in June he was cleared to return to training. He made his first start in three months in Castleford's victory against Leeds Rhinos, playing through an ankle injury. He scored tries against Hull and Huddersfield and finished the season having made seventeen appearances.

In October 2026, Hood agreed a one-year contract extension with Castleford for the 2027 season.

== International career ==
Hood made his international debut for Scotland in the 2012 European Cup.

In October and November 2015, Hood played for Scotland in the 2015 European Cup.

== Statistics ==
Appearances and points in all competitions by year
Club	Season	Tier	App	T	G	DG	Pts
Leeds Rhinos	2012	Super League	5	3	0	0	12
→ Dewsbury Rams (loan)	2012	Championship	12	2	0	0	8
Hunslet Hawks	2013 (Note: On dual registration from Leeds in 2013 before joining permanently in 2014)	Championship	19	5	0	0	20
Hunslet Hawks	2014	Championship 1	17	13	0	0	52
Hunslet Hawks	Total		36	18	0	0	72
Salford Red Devils	2015	Super League	22	1	0	0	4
Swinton Lions	2016	Championship	4	0	0	0	0
Leigh Centurions	2016	Championship	19	4	0	0	16
Leigh Centurions	2017	Super League	20	5	0	0	20
Leigh Centurions	2018	Championship	26	17	0	0	68
Leigh Centurions	2019	Championship	25	6	0	0	24
Leigh Centurions	2020	Championship	6	5	0	0	20
Leigh Centurions	2021	Super League	20	4	0	0	16
Leigh Centurions	Total		116	41	0	0	164
Widnes Vikings	2019	Championship	4	2	0	0	8
Wakefield Trinity	2022	Super League	20	6	0	0	24
Wakefield Trinity	2023	Super League	22	2	0	0	8
Wakefield Trinity	2024	Championship	29	12	0	0	48
Wakefield Trinity	2025	Super League	27	5	0	0	20
Wakefield Trinity	Total		98	25	0	0	100
Castleford Tigers	2026	Super League	17	4	0	0	16
Castleford Tigers	2027	Super League	0	0	0	0	0
Castleford Tigers	Total		17	4	0	0	16
Career total			314	96	0	0	384

As of match played 12 September 2026
