= Iwi Hauraki =

Greece international rugby league footballer

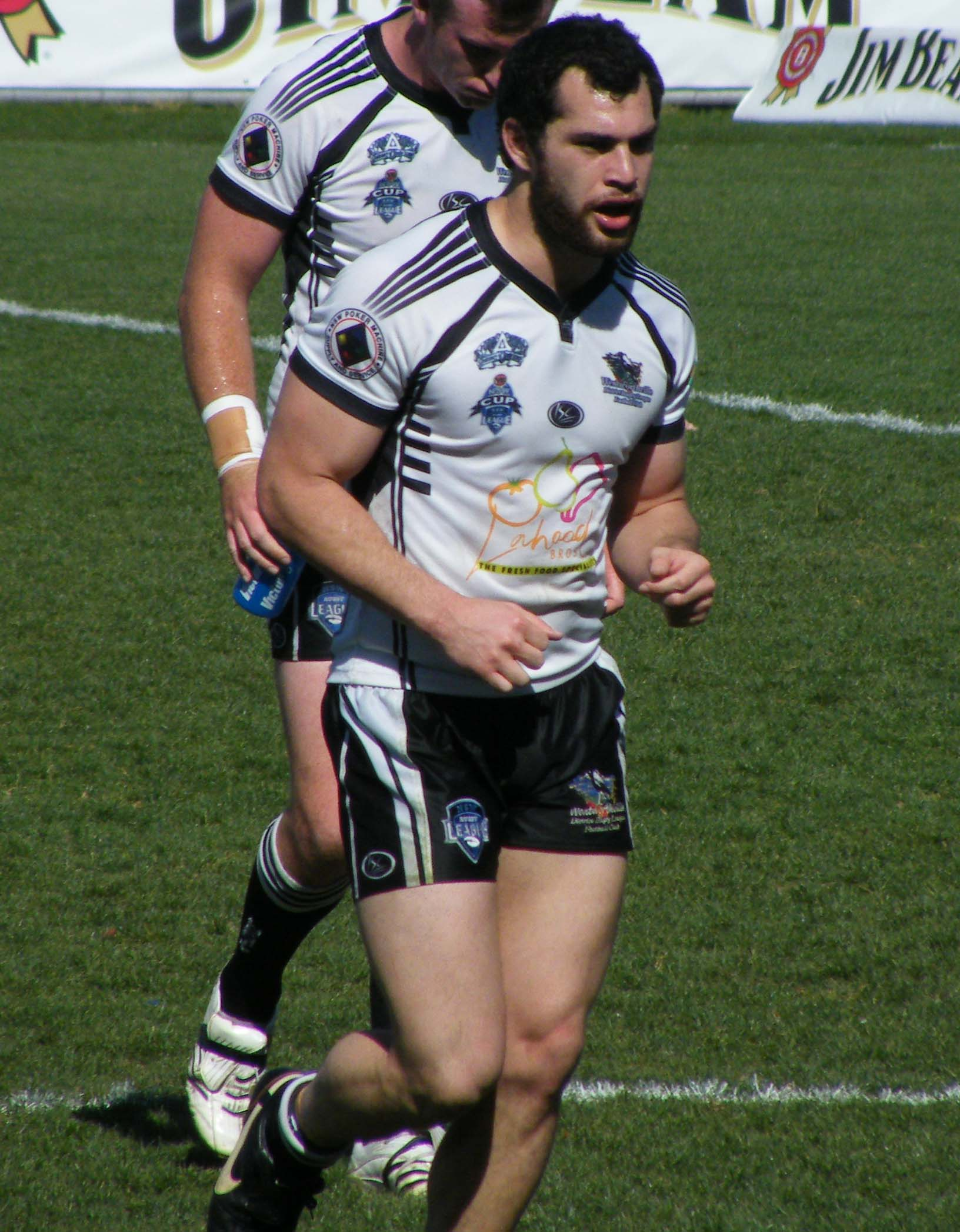
- Iwi Hauraki playing for the Wentworthville Magpies

Personal information
- Born: 7 July 1987 (age 39) Auckland, New Zealand
- Height: 175 cm (5 ft 9 in)
- Weight: 89 kg (14 st 0 lb)

Playing information
- Position: Wing
Club
| Years | Team | Pld | T | G | FG | P |
|---|---|---|---|---|---|---|
| 2009 | Sydney Roosters | 6 | 2 | 0 | 0 | 8 |
- Source: NRL StatsNRL Stats
- Relatives: Weller Hauraki (cousin)

Iwi Hauraki (born 7 July 1987) is a New Zealand former professional rugby league and rugby union footballer who played in the 2000s and 2010s. He last played club level rugby union (RU) for the Northland Taniwha in the ITM Cup.

== Playing career ==
In 2008, Hauraki played for Wentworthville in the 2008 NSW Cup grand final against Newtown. Hauraki scored the winning try for Wentworthville in the 104th minute during golden point extra-time. Hauraki made his National Rugby League debut for the Sydney Roosters in round 21 of the 2009 NRL season against Newcastle at Marathon Stadium. He made a total of six appearances in his one and only season for the Sydney Roosters as the club finished last on the table for the first time since 1966. He was subsequently released by the club.

== Representative career ==
Hauraki represented the Junior Kiwis in 2005 along with players such as Frank-Paul Nuuausala, Greg Eastwood, Sam Rapira and Sonny Fai.
