= George Tyson (rugby league, born 1993) =

English rugby league footballer

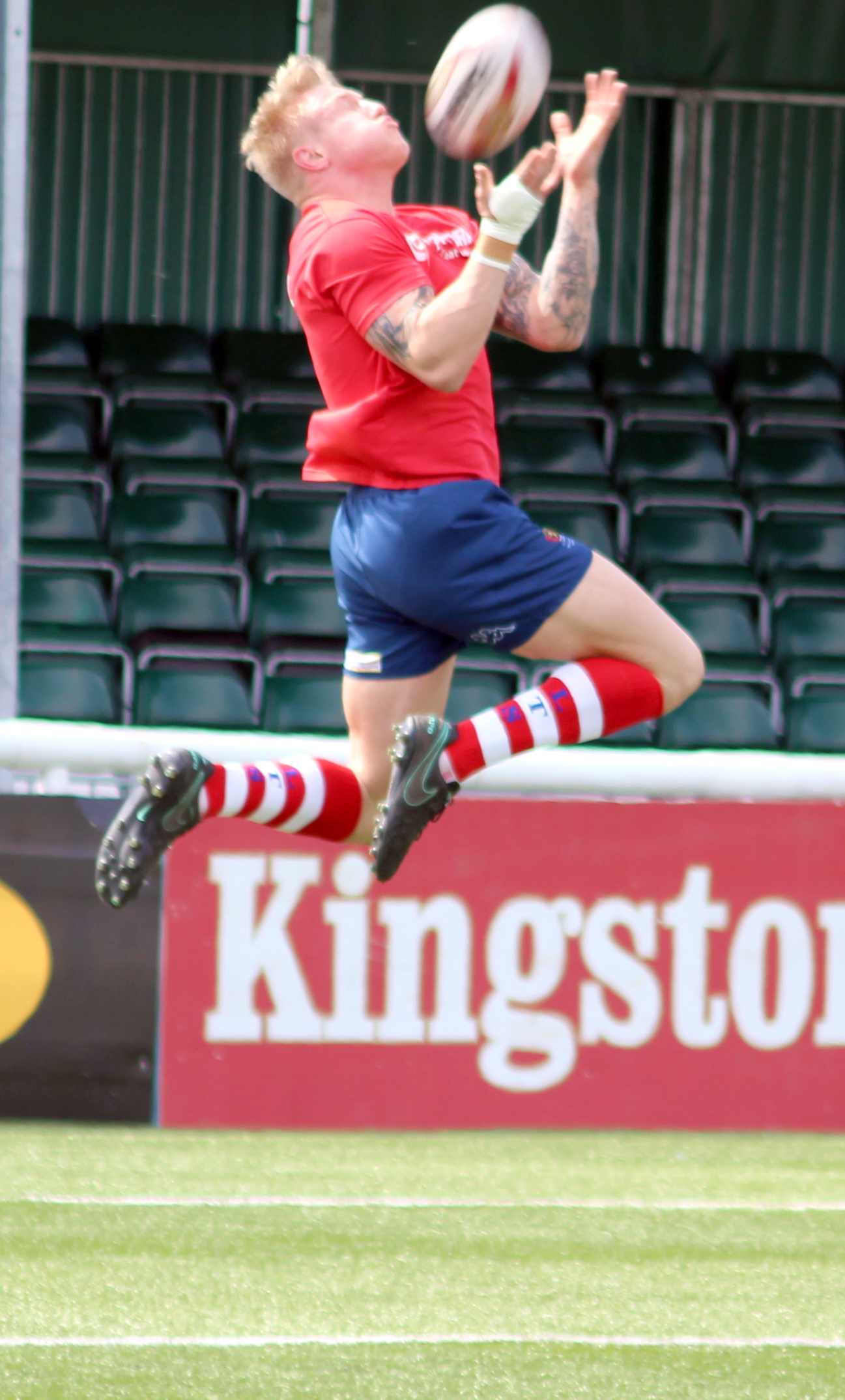

Personal information
- Born: 1 October 1993 (age 32)
- Height: 6 ft 1 in (1.86 m)
- Weight: 14 st 9 lb (93 kg)

Playing information
- Position: Centre, Second-row, Loose forward
Club
Years	Team	Pld	T	G	FG	P
2013	Salford City Reds	1	0	0	0	0
2014–15	Oldham	36	15	0	0	60
2016	Sheffield Eagles	26	5	0	0	20
2017	Oldham	22	10	0	0	40
2018	Swinton Lions	24	14	0	0	56
	Total	109	44	0	0	176
- Source: As of 21 October 2017

George Tyson is a rugby league footballer who plays as a centre, second-row or loose forward for Swinton in the Championship.

He has previously played for Salford, Sheffield Eagles and Oldham. He plays at loose forward or centre.
