= Gareth Hock =

Former Great Britain and England international rugby league footballer

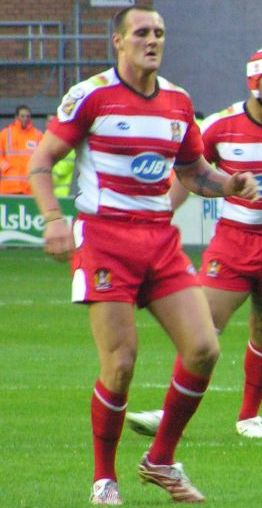

Personal information
- Full name: Gareth Hock
- Born: Gareth Charnock; 5 September 1983 (age 43) Wigan, Greater Manchester, England

Playing information
- Height: 6 ft 3 in (1.91 m)
- Weight: 15 st 8 lb (99 kg)
- Position: Second-row, Prop, Loose forward
Club
Years	Team	Pld	T	G	FG	P
2003–13	Wigan Warriors	191	48	0	0	192
2013(loan)	→ Widnes Vikings	18	10	1	0	42
2014–15	Salford Red Devils	17	6	0	0	24
2015–17	Leigh Centurions	53	12	0	0	48
2018	Featherstone Rovers	19	5	0	0	20
2019	Barrow Raiders	0	0	0	0	0
2019	Leigh Centurions	6	0	0	0	0
	Total	304	81	1	0	326
Representative
Years	Team	Pld	T	G	FG	P
2006	Great Britain	4	0	0	0	0
2008–12	England	5	0	0	0	0
- Relatives: Ryan Lannon (cousin)

Gareth Hock (born Gareth Charnock, 5 September 1983) is an English former professional rugby league footballer who played as a second-row, loose forward or prop. He last played for the Leigh Centurions in the Championship.

Hock began his career at Wigan Warriors in 2003, and had spells playing for Widnes Vikings, Salford Red Devils, Leigh Centurions, Featherstone Rovers and Barrow Raiders. He returned to Leigh Centurions before retiring in 2019. He won 4 caps for Great Britain and 5 for England at international level.

== Early life ==
Wigan-born Gareth Charnock joined Wigan Warriors' scholarship scheme from St Jude's, a local amateur team. He changed his surname after his parents separated.

== Career ==
=== 2000s ===
Hock gained international experience playing in the Great Britain Academy side that toured Australia in 2001. He worked his way up through the Wigan Warriors' scholarship and Academy systems, playing in the Academy Under-19s team during the 2002 season, but injury forced him to miss much of the latter part of the year. He was also called up to the England Academy squad to face the Aussie Schoolboys in December 2002. He played in the first Test, scoring a vital try in England's historic victory. He had achieved amateur representative honours, touring with Great Britain U16s and U18s.

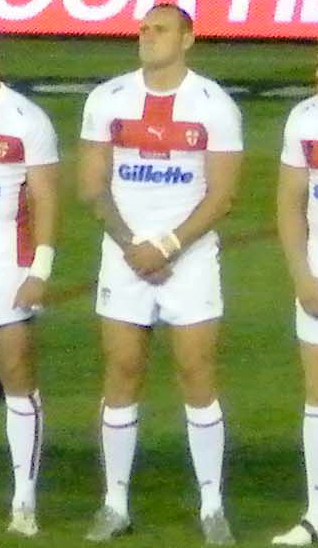
Hock lining up for England at the 2008 RLWC

He was included in the Wigan Warriors' 2003 first team squad by head coach Stuart Raper. Hock made his first team début that season against Doncaster in the Challenge Cup, scoring two tries after coming on as a substitute. He went on to become a first team regular for the rest of 2003's Super League VIII. He was included in the England A squad to face the Australians at Griffin Park, Brentford on 28 October 2003.

He was named Super League Young Player of the Year. Hock played for Wigan from the interchange bench in the 2003 Super League Grand Final which was lost to Bradford Bulls.

Hock signed a new one-year contract with the Wigan Warriors in June 2004. He picked up a medial cruciate ligament (MCL) knee injury against the Bradford Bulls on 25 February 2005. The injury required a full knee reconstruction which kept him sidelined until the end of the 2005 Super League X. He was expected to make his return in 2006's Super League XI but suffered a stress fracture to his shin and had to miss the start of 2006's Super League XI.

On 19 May 2006 Hock made his return in the Wigan Warriors' Challenge Cup match against the Salford City Reds which Wigan lost 4–16; despite being on the losing team Hock made an impressive return. He featured in the next match which was against rivals St. Helens, he was again impressive and scored a try but the Warriors lost 14–28.

In September 2008, he was named in the England training squad for the 2008 Rugby League World Cup, and in October 2008 he was named in the final 24-man England squad. He was named in the England team to face Wales at the Keepmoat Stadium, Doncaster, before England's departure for the 2008 Rugby League World Cup. He went with the England squad to compete in the 2008 Rugby League World Cup tournament in Australia. Group A's first match against Papua New Guinea he played at second-row in England's victory.

In June 2009, he tested positive for cocaine following tests on an 'A' sample of urine taken during a match between the Wigan Warriors and the Salford City Reds. A second 'B' sample also returned a positive result for benzoylecgonine, the main metabolite of cocaine. In August 2009, it was confirmed that Hock would face a two-year ban from rugby league as he did not appeal against the mandatory ban.

=== 2010s ===
On 10 May 2011, Gareth Hock signed a new contract with Wigan until 2015, beginning once his 2-year doping ban has ended on 23 June. He made a high-profile return against Huddersfield in a 2011 Super League game.

Since his return from his ban, he was a consistent member of the Wigan first team, gaining the number 12 jersey in the 2012 season (following the departure of Joel Tomkins to Saracens RUFC). Hock is well known for his aggressive and confrontational style of play and has begun to return to the high standard performances seen before his ban.

On 22 January 2013, Wigan announced that Hock would be joining Widnes on a season-long loan. After a possible move to NRL side Parramatta Eels fell through, on 5 September 2013 Salford announced he would be signing for them for the 2014 Super League season on a 4-year deal.

On 22 October 2013, England Rugby League issued the following statement: "As a result of serious breaches of team discipline that have fallen below the strict code of conduct as agreed by team management, Gareth Hock has been withdrawn from the England Rugby League World Cup squad with immediate effect. He is replaced by Huddersfield player Brett Ferres. There will be no further comment issued by England Rugby League on this matter."

In 2015 Gareth moved to play for Leigh in the Kingstone Press Championship. He made his début in a comfortable 54–6 victory over Workington Town.

In January 2018 he joined Featherstone Rovers on a one-year deal. In August 2018 Featherstone Rovers terminated his contract. On 23 October 2018 he joined Barrow Raiders.

In May 2019, following his release from Barrow, Hock re-joined Leigh Centurions. In July 2019, he announced his retirement from rugby league with immediate effect.

== Personal life ==
In March 2023, Hock appeared at Bolton Crown court after being charged with ten offences including assault by beating, coercive, controlling behaviour and perverting the course of justice. A ten-day trial was set by Judge Martin Walsh for April 2024 where Hock will be questioned by prosecutors, with a review hearing set for May. Hock was bailed under specific conditions that included surrendering his passport, wearing a GPS tracking tag and sleeping every night at his home address.
