= 2019 Widnes Vikings season =

Rugby club's season

- Championship Rank: 11th
- Challenge Cup: Round 6
- RFL 1895 Cup: Runners-up

Team information
- Head Coach: Keiron Purtill
- Stadium: Halton Stadium
List of seasons	2020 →

In the 2019 rugby league season, Widnes Vikings competed in the RFL Championship, the Challenge Cup and the 1895 Cup. It was the first season since their relegation from the Super League at the end of 2018. Widnes began the season on -12 points after going into administration, but following a takeover and the appointment of a new board of directors the club were able to maintain their Championship status and reach the final of the 1895 Cup.

== Results ==
=== Championship ===
==== League table ====
Pos	Team	Pld	W	D	L	PF	PA	PD	Pts	Qualification
1	Toronto Wolfpack	27	26	0	1	1010	356	+654	52	Play-off semi-final
2	Toulouse Olympique	27	20	0	7	877	446	+431	40	Play-off qualifying final
3	York City Knights	27	19	1	7	612	529	+83	39	Play-off qualifying final
4	Leigh Centurions	27	18	0	9	792	558	+234	36	Play-off elimination final
5	Featherstone Rovers	27	17	0	10	837	471	+366	34	Play-off elimination final
6	Bradford Bulls	27	16	1	10	717	522	+195	33	
7	Sheffield Eagles	27	15	0	12	748	694	+54	30	
8	Halifax	27	10	1	16	602	685	−83	21	
9	Swinton Lions	27	10	1	16	619	803	−184	21	
10	Batley Bulldogs	27	8	1	18	462	756	−294	17	
11	Widnes Vikings	27	14	0	13	646	586	+60	16 (Note: Widnes deducted 12 points for going into administration.)	
12	Dewsbury Rams	27	6	2	19	513	721	−208	14	
13	Barrow Raiders	27	5	1	21	479	861	−382	11	Relegated to League 1
14	Rochdale Hornets	27	1	0	26	342	1268	−926	2	Relegated to League 1

==== Championship results ====
W Win D Draw L Loss

Championship results
Date	Round	Versus	H/A	Venue	Result	Score	Tries	Goals	Attendance	Report
3 February	1	Halifax	H	Halton Stadium	W	40–16	Ince (3), Gelling, Craven, Owens	Owens (6)	4,283	RLP, BBC
9 February	2	Toulouse Olympique	A	Stade Ernest-Argelès	W	40–16	Gelling (2), Chapelhow, Craven, Hood, Ince	Owens (6)	2,189	RLP
16 February	3	Toronto Wolfpack	A	Kingston Park	L	6–30	Walker	Owens	1,817	RLP
3 March	5	Featherstone Rovers	H	Halton Stadium	W	44–22	Ince (2), Owens (2), Gelling, Hood, Walker, Wilde	Owens (6)	5,782	RLP
10 March	6	Barrow Raiders	A	Craven Park	W	20–4	Cahill, Craven, Ince, Walker	Gilmore (2)	1,745	RLP
17 March	7	Bradford Bulls	H	Halton Stadium	W	25–20	Brand, Craven, Ince, Johnstone	Owens (4), Craven (FG)	5,335	RLP
24 March	8	Rochdale Hornets	A	Spotland Stadium	W	50–4	Ince (4), Brand, Buckley, Hansen, Roby, Wilde	Owens (7)	1,732	RLP
7 April	9	Batley Bulldogs	A	Mount Pleasant	L	18–20	Roby (2), Johnstone	Owens (3)	1,420	RLP
19 April	10	Leigh Centurions	H	Halton Stadium	W	30–12	Lyons (2), Gelling, O'Neill, Walker	Owens (5)	5,866	RLP
22 April	11	York City Knights	A	Bootham Crescent	L	10–17	Ince, Wilde	Owens	2,229	RLP
28 April	12	Dewsbury Rams	H	Halton Stadium	L	24–25	Owens (3), Craven	Owens (4)	3,851	RLP
5 May	13	Swinton Lions	A	Heywood Road	W	32–10	Chapelhow (2), Craven, Lyons, Wilde	Owens (6)	1,469	RLP
19 May	14	Leigh Centurions	N	Bloomfield Road	L	22–36	Craven (2). Buckley, Roby	Roby (3)	7,158	RLP
26 May	15	York City Knights	H	Halton Stadium	L	12–16	Lyons, Roby	Freeman (2)	3,408	RLP
31 May	4	Sheffield Eagles	H	Halton Stadium	W	36–6	Brand (2), Cahill, Dean, Hatton, Ince, Owens	Owens (4)	4,920	RLP
9 June	16	Barrow Raiders	H	Halton Stadium	W	38–14	Chapelhow (2), Hatton (2), Craven, Lyons, Roby	Owens (5)	3,830	RLP
16 June	17	Featherstone Rovers	A	Post Office Road	L	4–22	Ince		2,380	RLP
21 June	18	Batley Bulldogs	H	Halton Stadium	W	28–22	Chapelhow, Dean, Gelling, Hatton, Norman	Edge (4)	3,742	RLP
30 June	19	Bradford Bulls	A	Odsal Stadium	L	0–62			3,895	RLP
7 July	20	Rochdale Hornets	H	Halton Stadium	W	40–12	Owens (2), Ah Van (2), Ashall-Bott, Craven, Roby	Owens (4)	3,780	RLP
14 July	21	Halifax	A	The Shay	L	10–40	Hatton, Wilde	Owens	1,668	RLP
21 July	22	Toronto Wolfpack	H	Halton Stadium	L	19–24	Craven, Ince, Roby	Owens (3), Craven (FG)	3,813	RLP
2 August	23	Sheffield Eagles	A	Olympic Legacy Stadium	L	10–30	Ince, Robson	Owens	772	RLP
10 August	24	Toulouse Olympique	H	Halton Stadium	L	12–28	Cahill, Owens	Owens (2)	3,643	RLP
18 August	25	Leigh Centurions	A	Leigh Sports Village	L	22–34	Brand (2), Ashall-Bott, Hatton	Gilmore (3)	3,559	RLP
1 September	26	Swinton Lions	H	Halton Stadium	W	36–28	Ah Van (2), Brand, Dean, Ganson, Owens, Roby	Owens (3), Dean	3,928	RLP
8 September	27	Dewsbury Rams	A	Crown Flatt	W	22–8	Buckley (2), Dean, Owens	Owens (3)	1,409	RLP

=== Challenge Cup ===
W Win L Loss

Challenge Cup results
Date	Round	Versus	H/A	Venue	Result	Score	Tries	Goals	Attendance	Report
31 May	4	Oldham	A	Bower Fold	W	54–14	Buckley (3). Owens (3), Brand, Ince, Johnstone, Roby	Owens (7)	1,247	RLP
13 April	5	York City Knights	H	Halton Stadium	W	44–12	Freeman (4), Brand, Ince, Lyons, Owens	Owens (6)	2,229	RLP
10 May	6	Wakefield Trinity	A	Belle Vue	L	6–26	Roby	Owens	3,055	RLP

=== 1895 Cup ===
W Win L Loss

1895 Cup results
Date	Round	Versus	H/A	Venue	Result	Score	Tries	Goals	Attendance	Report
5 June	2	Featherstone Rovers	H	Halton Stadium	W	22–16	Hatton (3), Lyons	Owens (3)	1,515	RLP
26 June	Quarter-final	Dewsbury Rams	H	Halton Stadium	W	54–6	Gelling (3), Roby (3), Wilde (2), Dean, Walker	Owens (7)	1,458	RLP
28 July	Semi-final	Leigh Centurions	A	Leigh Sports Village	W	12–8	Gelling, Owens	Owens (2)	4,460	RLP
24 August	Final	Sheffield Eagles	N	Wembley Stadium	L	18–36	Deam, Gilmore, Hansen	Owens (3)	62,717	RLP
