= Jack Holmes (rugby league, born 1994) =

English rugby league footballer

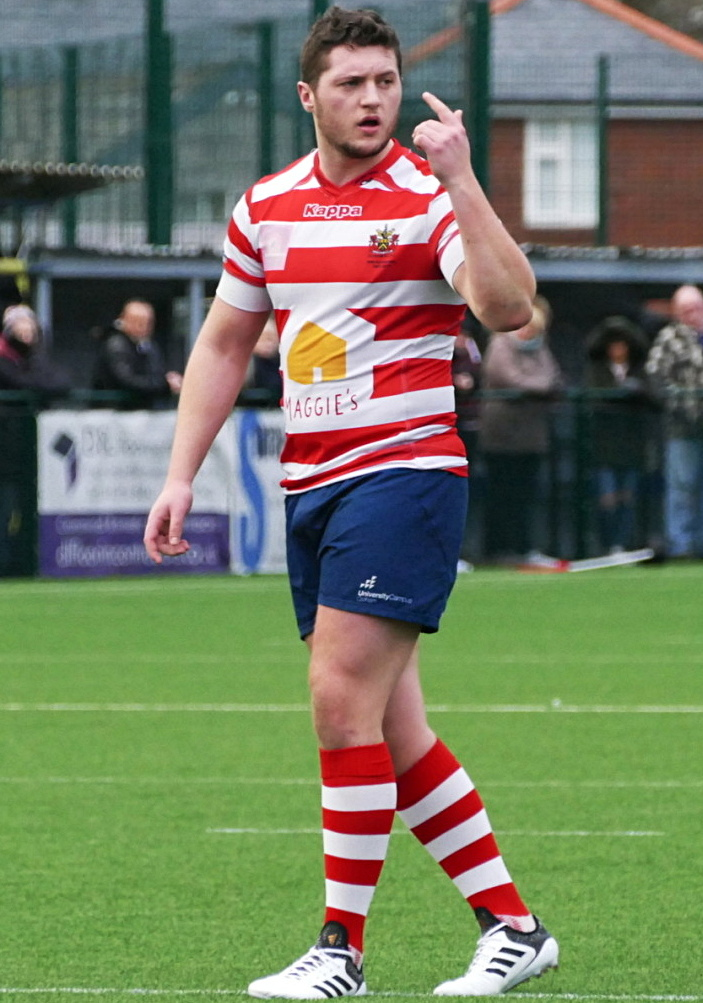

Personal information
- Full name: Jack Holmes
- Born: 15 January 1994 (age 32) Leigh, Greater Manchester, England
- Height: 6 ft 0 in (1.83 m)
- Weight: 14 st 7 lb (92 kg)

Playing information
- Position: Centre, Wing, Fullback
Club
Years	Team	Pld	T	G	FG	P
2011	Salford City Reds	1	0	0	0	0
2015–16	Oldham RLFC	33	19	1	0	78
2016(loan)	→ Rochdale Hornets	9	2	0	0	8
2016	Rochdale Hornets	13	3	0	0	12
2018–19	Oldham RLFC	33	13	0	0	52
2020–25	North Wales Crusaders	74	15	3	0	66
2026	Rochdale Hornets	1	0	0	0	0
2026–	Salford RLFC	1	0	0	0	0
	Total	165	52	4	0	216
- Source: As of 31 October 2026

Jack Holmes (born 15 January 1994) is a professional rugby league footballer who plays as a centre, wing, fullback, scrum-half for the Salford RLFC in the RFL Championship.

== Playing career ==
Holmes has previously played for Salford City Reds academy, Rochdale Hornets, Halifax, Oldham RLFC and the Leigh Centurions.

Holmes has enjoyed significant success in League 1, winning promotion from the division on three occasions — including key roles in Oldham’s and Rochdale’s promotion campaigns, and contributing his experience during North Wales Crusaders’ pushes toward the Championship.

=== Rochdale Hornets (re-join) ===
On 23 October 2025 it was reported that he had signed for Rochdale Hornets in the RFL Championship.

He made his one appearance for the club in the defeat to Whitehaven RLFC at the start of March 2026.

=== Salford RLFC ===
On 10 March 2026 it was reported that he had been released by Rochdale Hornets, to allow him to pursue opportunities elsewhere; he subsequently signed for Salford RLFC in the RFL Championship

He made his début for Salford RLFC on the wing on 22 March 2026 in the 66-6 away defeat to London Broncos.
