= Matt Haggarty =

English rugby league footballer

Personal information
- Full name: Matthew Haggarty
- Born: 8 January 1991 (age 35) England
- Height: 6 ft 5 in (195 cm)
- Weight: 18 st 4 lb (116 kg)

Playing information
- Position: Prop
Club
Years	Team	Pld	T	G	FG	P
2011–12	Whitehaven	26	1	0	0	4
2013	Barrow Raiders	16	0	0	0	0
2013	Oldham	4	1	0	0	4
2014–15	Dewsbury Rams	41	1	0	0	4
2015–16	St. Helens	0	0	0	0	0
2015(loan)	→ Rochdale Hornets	6	1	0	0	4
2016(loan)	→ Salford Red Devils	1	0	0	0	0
2016(loan)	→ N. Wales Crusaders	8	0	0	0	0
	Total	102	4	0	0	16
- Source: As of 12 September 2016

Matthew Haggarty (born 8 January 1991) is an English professional rugby league footballer who most recently played for the North Wales Crusaders in the Kingstone Press League 1, as a prop.

He is on a season long loan from St. Helens.
