= Connor Williams (rugby league) =

English rugby league footballer

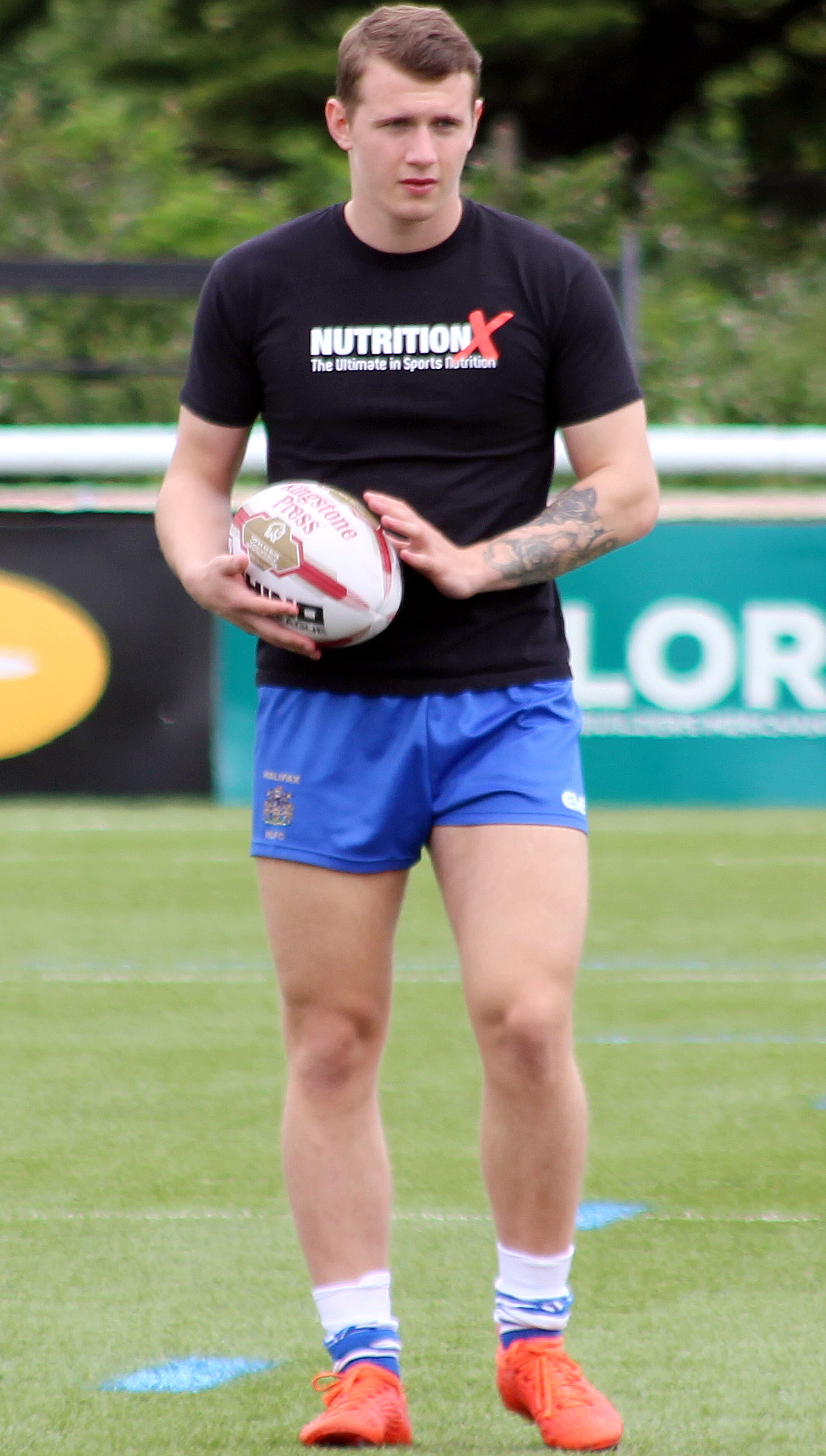

Personal information
- Born: 29 August 1998 (age 27) Wigan, Greater Manchester, England
- Height: 178 cm (5 ft 10 in)
- Weight: 81 kg (12 st 11 lb)

Playing information
- Position: Fullback, Centre, Wing
Club
| Years | Team | Pld | T | G | FG | P |
|---|---|---|---|---|---|---|
| 2016–17 | Salford Red Devils | 1 | 0 | 0 | 0 | 0 |
| 2017(DR) | → Halifax | 1 | 0 | 0 | 0 | 0 |
| 2017(DR) | → Oldham | 4 | 1 | 0 | 0 | 4 |
| 2018 | Hull Kingston Rovers | 0 | 0 | 0 | 0 | 0 |
| | Total | 6 | 1 | 0 | 0 | 4 |
- Source: As of 13 January 2019

Connor Williams (born 29 August 1998) is an English professional rugby league footballer who most recently played as a fullback for Hull Kingston Rovers in the Super League.

== Background ==
Williams was born in Wigan, Greater Manchester, England.

== Playing career ==
=== Playing positions ===
He primarily plays as a fullback, but he can also play as a centre or on the wing.

=== Salford Red Devils (2016-17) ===
On 3 June 2016, he made his Salford Red Devils' Super League début against the Wigan Warriors. The game at the AJ Bell Stadium, ended in a 20-23 victory to Wigan.

=== Hull Kingston Rovers (2018) ===
Williams signed a contract to play for newly-promoted Hull Kingston Rovers ahead of the 2018 Super League campaign.

Williams left Hull Kingston Rovers before the start of the 2019 season without playing a single game for the club, due to longstanding issues with injury.

=== Dual-registration ===
In 2017, he featured on dual-registration for two separate clubs, he only appeared on one single occasion for Halifax, he also recorded four appearances and one try for Oldham.
