= Matt Sarsfield =

English rugby league player (born 1991)

Personal information
- Born: 10 September 1991 (age 34) Leigh, Greater Manchester, England

Playing information
- Position: Second-row
Club
Years	Team	Pld	T	G	FG	P
2011	Dewsbury Rams	4	0	0	0	0
2013	Swinton Lions	16	8	0	0	32
2014–15	Leigh Centurions	31	12	0	0	48
2016	Salford Red Devils	5	1	0	0	4
2016(loan)	→ Halifax	9	7	0	0	28
2017–18	Swinton Lions	10	3	0	0	0
	Total	75	31	0	0	112
- Source: As of 16 June 2018

Matt Sarsfield (born 10 September 1991) is an English professional rugby league footballer who last played as a second row forward for the Swinton Lions in the Championship.

In 2020, he appeared in the eighth series of the E4 reality series Celebs Go Dating.
