= Adam Walne =

English rugby league footballer

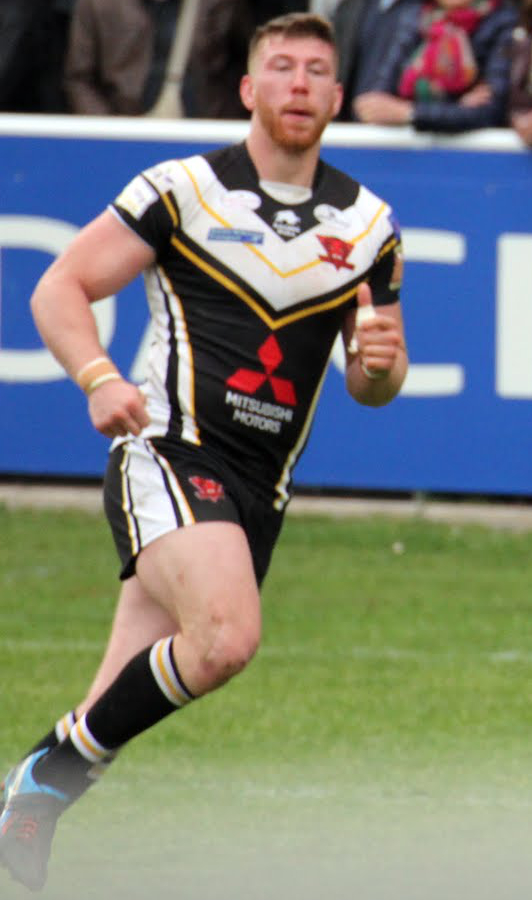

Personal information
- Full name: Adam Mark Walne
- Born: 3 October 1990 (age 36) Greater Manchester, England
- Height: 6 ft 2 in (1.88 m)
- Weight: 17 st 0 lb (108 kg)

Playing information
- Position: Prop
Club
Years	Team	Pld	T	G	FG	P
2012–17	Salford Red Devils	74	3	0	0	12
2012(loan)	→ Workington Town	2	1	0	0	4
2013(loan)	→ Workington Town	7	1	0	0	4
2014(loan)	→ Barrow Raiders	1	0	0	0	0
2018–20	Huddersfield Giants	12	0	0	0	0
2018(loan)	→ Leigh Centurions	8	0	0	0	0
2021–22	Barrow Raiders	10	1	0	0	0
	Total	114	6	0	0	20
- Source: As of 15 December 2020
- Relatives: Jordan Walne (brother)

Adam Walne (born 3 October 1990), also known by the nickname of "Waldo", is an English professional rugby league footballer who plays as a prop for the Barrow Raiders in the RFL championship 1.

He played for Salford in the Super League, spending time on loan from the Reds at Workington Town and the Barrow Raiders. In 2018 he spent time on loan from Huddersfield at the Leigh Centurions in the Championship.

== Background ==
Walne was born in Greater Manchester, England. He is the brother of Jordan Walne who is also a rugby league footballer.

== Playing career ==
=== Salford ===
Walne joined Salford from amateur club Leyland ARLFC, from Leyland near Preston. He made his début for the club on 20 August 2012 in a Super League match against Wigan at the DW Stadium.

==== Dual registration ====
In 2012 and 2013, Walne was dual registered with Championship club Workington Town. He also spent some time dual registered with Barrow of Championship 1 in 2014.

=== Huddersfield ===
In September 2017, it was announced that Walne had joined the Huddersfield Giants on a three-year deal from 2018.

=== Barrow Raiders ===
It was announced in September 2020 that Walne would join his brother at Barrow Raiders on a two-year deal. They both left Barrow Raiders in February 2022.
