= Carl Forster =

English professional rugby league footballer

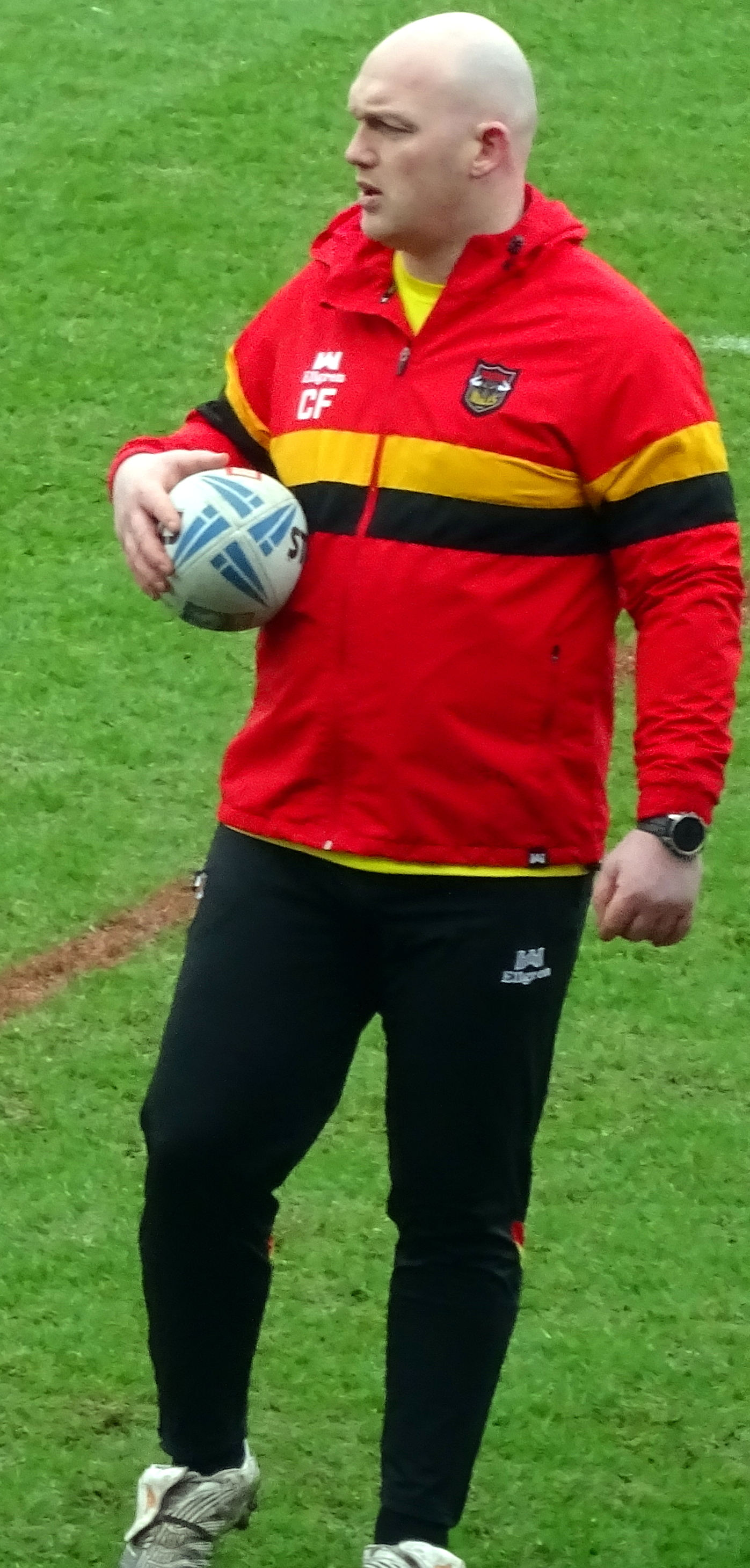

Personal information
- Full name: Carl Forster
- Born: 4 June 1992 (age 33) St Helens, Merseyside, England
- Height: 6 ft 1 in (185 cm)
- Weight: 17 st 5 lb (110 kg)

Playing information
- Position: Prop
Club
Years	Team	Pld	T	G	FG	P
2011–14	St Helens	5	0	0	0	0
2012(loan)	→ Swinton Lions	12	0	0	0	0
2013(loan)	→ Rochdale Hornets	12	1	0	0	4
2013(loan)	→ Whitehaven	3	1	0	0	4
2014(loan)	→ London Broncos	5	0	0	0	0
2014(loan)	→ Whitehaven	19	3	0	0	12
2015–16	Salford Red Devils	16	1	0	0	4
2016(loan)	→ Swinton Lions	4	0	0	0	0
2017–18	Whitehaven	34	26	0	0	64
2019–20	Rochdale Hornets	8	3	0	0	0
2020–22	Barrow Raiders	39	2	0	0	8
2023–24	North Wales Crusaders	22	4	0	0	16
	Total	179	41	0	0	112

Coaching information
Club
Years	Team	Gms	W	D	L	W%
2017–18	Whitehaven	71	59	2	10	83
2019	Rochdale Hornets	7	2	0	5	29
2023–25	North Wales Crusaders	66	33	0	33	50
	Total	144	94	2	48	65
- Source: As of 4 October 2025

Carl Forster (born 4 June 1992) is an English professional rugby league coach who is an assistant coach at the Bradford Bulls in the Super League. He is a former professional rugby league footballer and former head coach.

He played for St Helens in the Super League, and on loan from Saints at a number of clubs.

He has previously coached Whitehaven in League 1, Rochdale Hornets in the Championship and the North Wales Crusaders in League 1.

== Background ==
Forster was born in St Helens, Merseyside, England.

== Playing career ==
=== St Helens ===
He signed for Saints from local amateur club Pilkington Recs in 2009. 2011's Super League XVI was his first as a professional with St. Helens. He enjoyed Grand Final success with St. Helens Academy. In June 2012, Carl signed a 2-year contract with St. Helens.

=== Salford Red Devils ===
He played for Salford in the Super League until the end of 2015.

=== Swinton Lions ===
In the 2016 season, Forster played for Swinton.

=== Whitehaven RLFC ===
For the 2017 season, Forster played for Whitehaven while also serving as the team's head coach.

=== Rochdale Hornets ===
In 2019, Forster moved on to the Rochdale Hornets as player-coach before moving back to Whitehaven that season on loan after re-signing from Rochdale.

=== Barrow Raiders ===
On 23 September 2019, it was reported that he had signed for Barrow in the RFL League 1 on a Player-only one-year deal.

=== North Wales Crusaders ===
On 5 November 2022, it was reported that he had taken up the player-coach role at North Wales Crusaders in the RFL League 1 for the 2023 season.

On 4 October 2025, only days after winning the League One Coach of the Year award, it was reported that he had left the club to take up a full-time Super League coaching opportunity
