= Weller Hauraki =

New Zealand Maori rugby league footballer

Weller "Wello" Hauraki
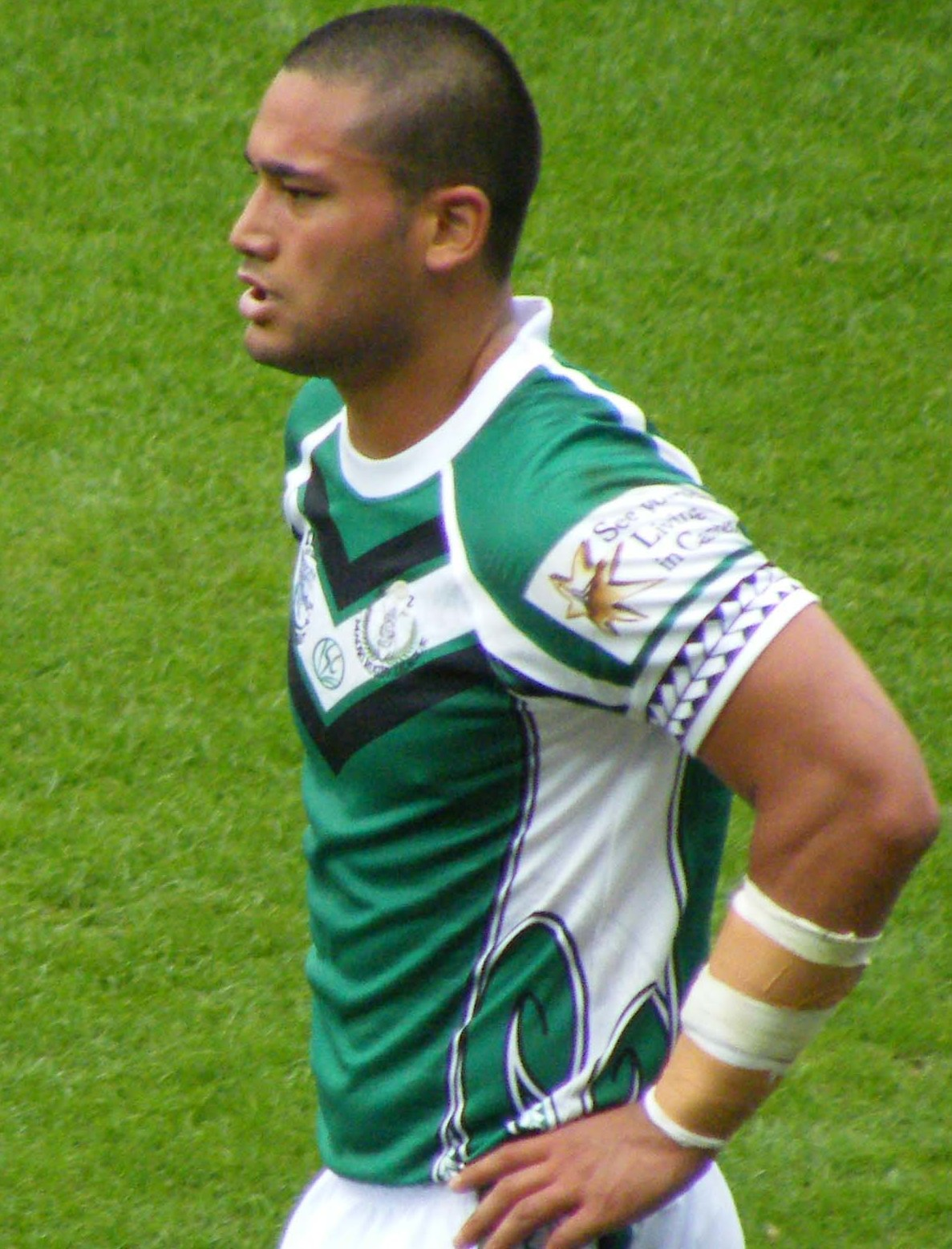

Personal information
- Full name: Weller Hauraki
- Born: 18 February 1985 (age 41) Dannevirke, Manawatu-Wanganui, New Zealand

Playing information
- Height: 185 cm (6 ft 1 in)
- Weight: 100 kg (15 st 10 lb)
- Position: Second-row, Loose forward
Club
Years	Team	Pld	T	G	FG	P
2007–09	Parramatta Eels	32	4	0	0	16
2010	Crusaders RL	28	11	0	0	44
2011–12	Leeds Rhinos	39	6	0	0	24
2013–14	Castleford Tigers	56	9	0	0	36
2015–18	Salford Red Devils	73	14	0	0	56
2018(loan)	→ Widnes Vikings	13	2	0	0	8
2019–20	Hull Kingston Rovers	43	6	0	0	24
	Total	284	52	0	0	208
Representative
Years	Team	Pld	T	G	FG	P
2005–10	New Zealand Māori	5	1	0	0	4
- Relatives: Iwi Hauraki (cousin)

Weller Hauraki (born 18 February 1985) is a New Zealand former professional rugby league footballer who played as a second-row or loose forward and played for the New Zealand Māori at international level.

He has played for the Parramatta Eels in the NRL, and Crusaders RL, Leeds Rhinos, Castleford Tigers, Hull Kingston Rovers and the Salford Red Devils in the Super League, spending time on loan from Salford at the Widnes Vikings in 2018.

== Background ==
Hauraki was born in Dannevirke, New Zealand.

== Manawatu (2002) ==
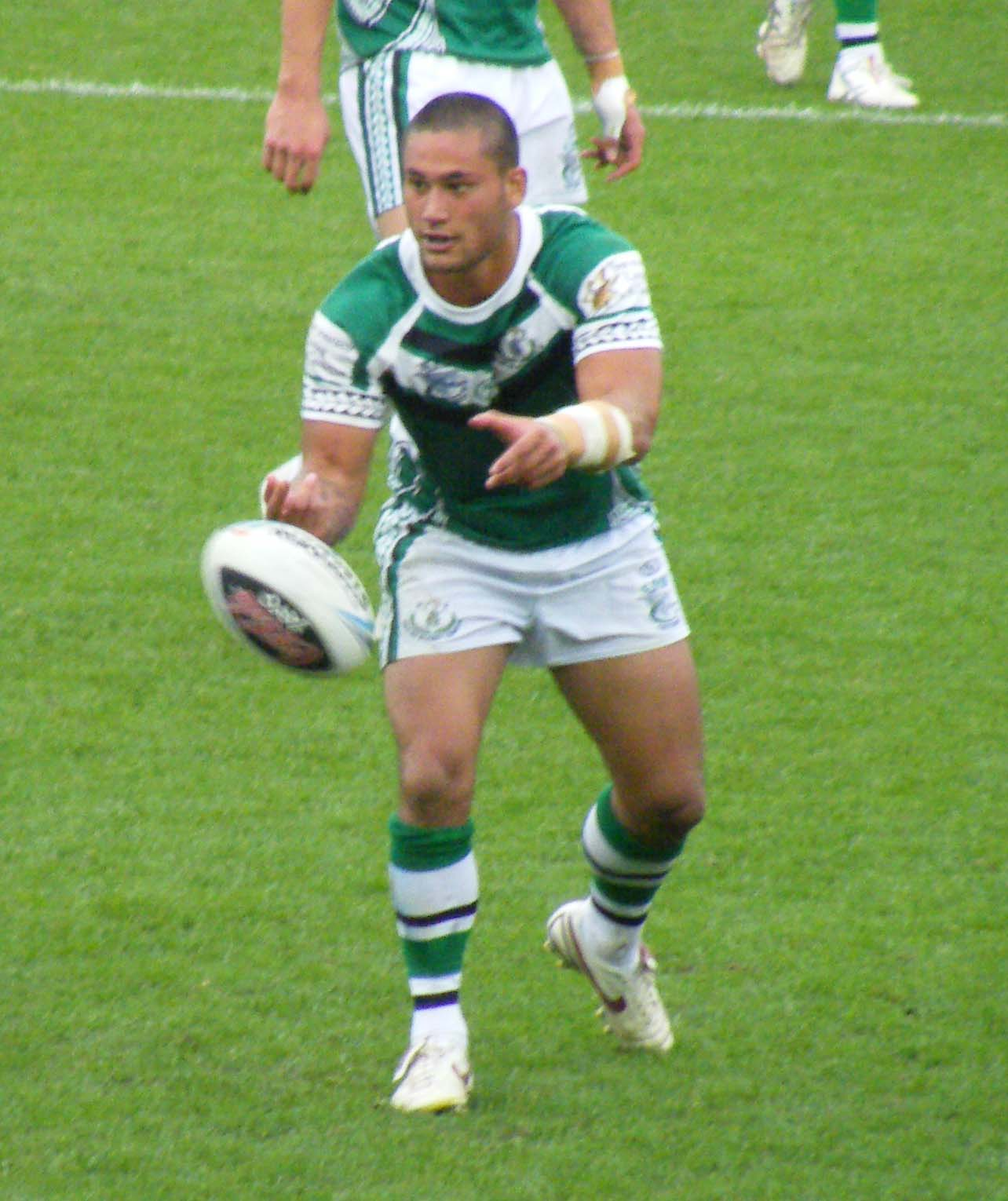
Weller Hauraki in action

=== 2002 ===
Hauraki played for Manawatu in the 2002 North Island Super 6 competition.

== Parramatta Eels (2007-09) ==
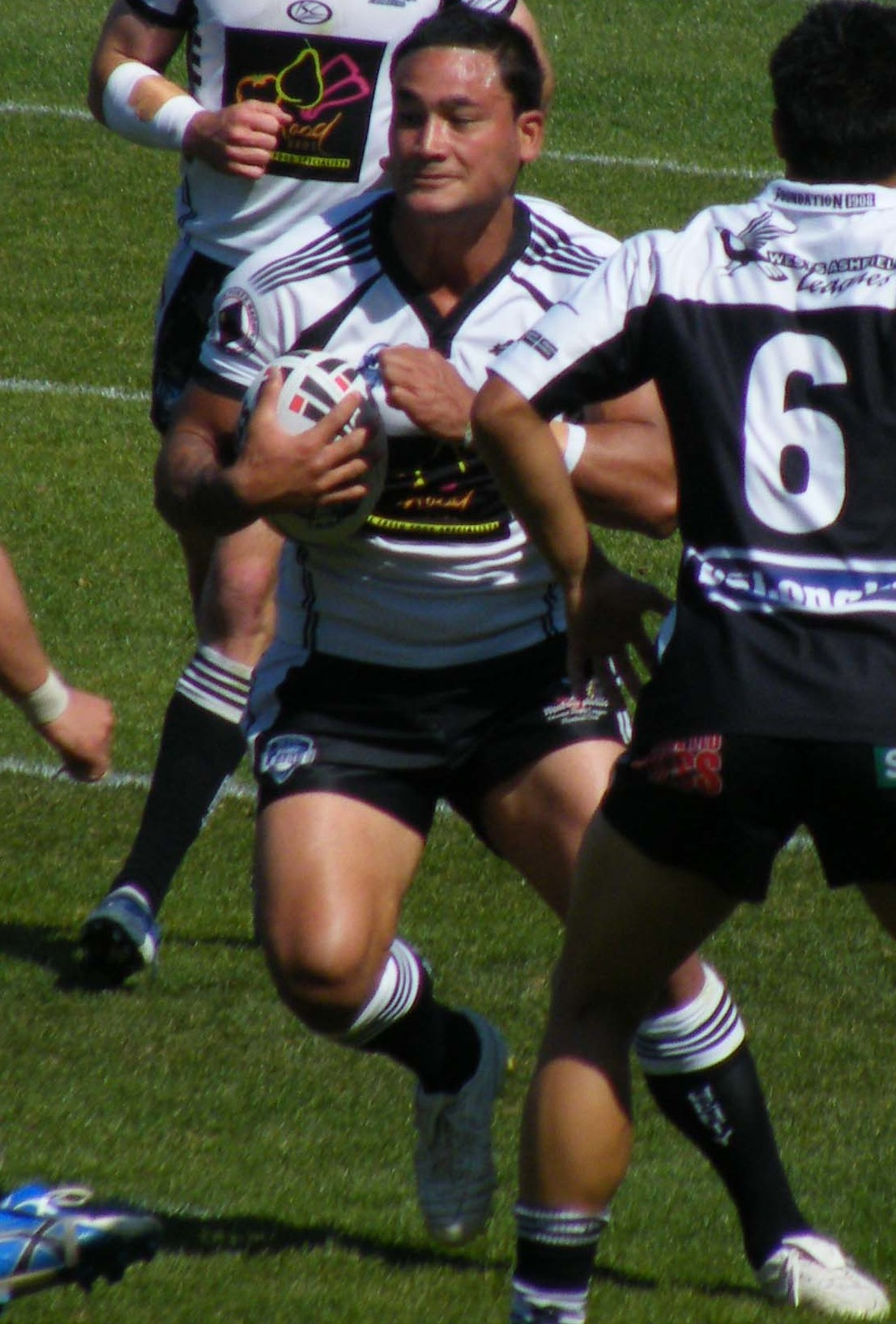
Hauraki playing in 2009

=== 2007-09 ===
Hauraki began his career in the National Rugby League playing for the Parramatta Eels, he made his début against the New Zealand Warriors during the 2007 season, and he went on to make 32 appearances over three seasons. Hauraki also won the 2007 Intrust Super Premiership NSW competition with Parramatta, scoring a try right on the final siren to defeat the North Sydney Bears, 20-15. His most memorable game for the Eels came in round 6 of the 2009 season, when he scored two tries against the Canterbury-Bankstown Bulldogs, after replacing his injured teammate Nathan Hindmarsh.

== Crusaders RL (2010) ==
=== 2010 ===
In 2010, to ease pressure on the Parramatta Eels' salary cap, Hauraki was released and went on to sign a two-year contract with the Crusaders RL club in the Super League.

He made his début for the Crusaders against the Wigan Warriors on 5 February 2010, at the DW Stadium.

== Leeds Rhinos (2011–12) ==
=== 2011 ===
After his very impressive first season in the Super League, Hauraki signed a three-year contract to play for the Leeds Rhinos.

He made his début from off the interchange bench against Hull F.C. and he scored in the Rhinos' 32-18 victory.

He played at loose forward for Leeds in the 2011 Challenge Cup Final defeat by the Wigan Warriors at Wembley Stadium.

== Castleford Tigers (2013–14) ==
=== 2013 ===
Hauraki then joined the Castleford Tigers ahead of the 2013 season.

Weller quickly established himself in what surprisingly became one of the Super League's most feared packs, helping the Castleford Tigers cement their highest-ever Super League finish of 4th.

=== 2014 ===
He was also instrumental in a run to the 2014 Challenge Cup Final defeat by the Leeds Rhinos at Wembley Stadium, with that ending in a 23-10 defeat by his former club and rivals the Leeds Rhinos.

== Salford Red Devils (2015–18) ==
=== 2015-18 ===
Hauraki represented the Salford Red Devils for four consecutive seasons, recording 73 appearances and scoring 14 tries for the club in total.

== Widnes Vikings (2018) ==
=== 2018 ===
During the 2018 season, Hauraki was sent out on loan from the Salford Red Devils to the struggling Widnes Vikings, where he subsequently suffered relegation from the Super League with the Vikings at the end of the campaign.

== Hull Kingston Rovers (2019–2020) ==
=== 2019 ===
It was revealed on 3 October 2018, that Hauraki had committed to a two-year deal to join Hull Kingston Rovers ahead of the 2019 Super League season.

Hauraki made his Hull Kingston Rovers début on 1 February 2019, in round 1 of the Super League season against cross-city rivals Hull F.C. He started the game at loose forward and went on to record a thrilling 18-16 victory at Craven Park.

Weller scored his first try for Hull Kingston Rovers on 23 February 2019, in a 22-24 Super League round 4 defeat by the Salford Red Devils.

=== 2020 ===
Hauraki was released by Hull KR at the end of the 2020 season.

=== 2021 ===
On 9 February 2021 it was reported that Hauraki had decided to retire.

== Representative career (2005–10) ==
Hauraki was named in the New Zealand training squad for the 2008 Rugby League World Cup, but did not make the final squad.

However, Hauraki did play for the New Zealand Māori in their 34-26 defeat by the Indigenous All Stars before the start of the 2008 Rugby League World Cup, having previously represented the side in 2005.

Hauraki again played for the New Zealand Māori in 2010, in the 18-18 draw against England.
