= Josh Wood (rugby league) =

English semi-professional rugby league footballer

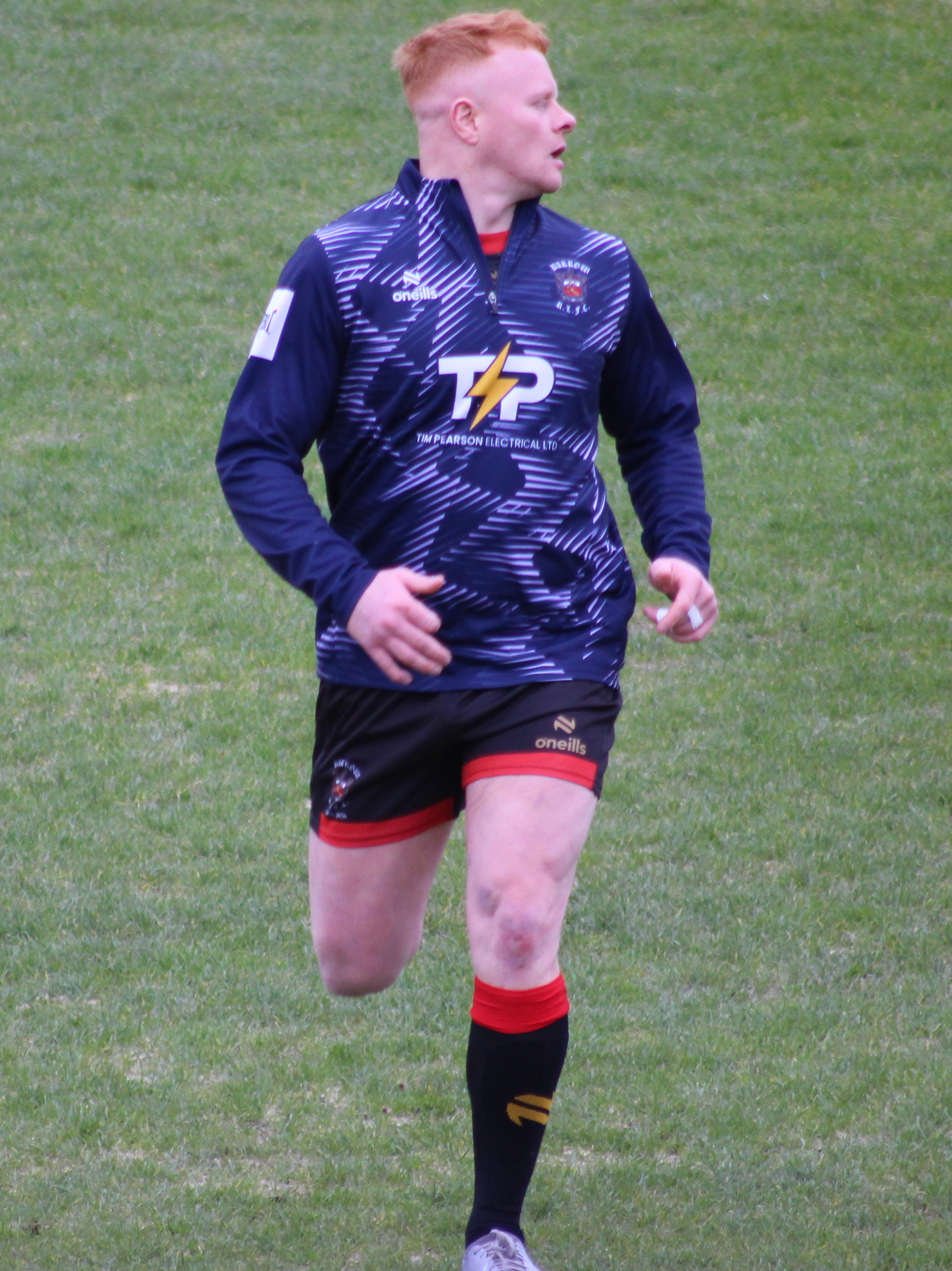

Personal information
- Full name: Joshua Wood
- Born: 15 November 1995 (age 30) Wigan, Greater Manchester, England
- Height: 5 ft 9 in (1.75 m)
- Weight: 13 st 1 lb (83 kg)

Playing information
- Position: Hooker, Scrum-half, Stand-off
Club
Years	Team	Pld	T	G	FG	P
2015–19	Salford Red Devils	48	5	0	0	20
2016(loan)	→ N Wales Crusaders	1	0	0	0	0
2017(loan)	→ Halifax	4	1	0	0	4
2017(loan)	→ Halifax	2	1	0	0	4
2020–21	Wakefield Trinity	17	1	0	0	4
2022–	Barrow Raiders	107	12	0	0	48
	Total	179	20	0	0	80
- Source: As of 16 October 2025

Josh Wood (born 15 November 1995) is an English semi-professional rugby league footballer who plays as a hooker for the Barrow Raiders in the RFL Championship.

He previously played for the Salford Red Devils in the Super League, and spent time on loan from Salford at the North Wales Crusaders in League 1, and Halifax and the Swinton Lions in the Championship. He played as a scrum-half and stand-off earlier in his career.

== Background ==
Wood was born in Wigan, Greater Manchester, England.

== Career ==
=== Salford Red Devils ===
Wood made his Red Devils début in a Super League match on 22 May 2015 against the Warrington Wolves.

=== Barrow Raiders ===
On 11 October 2021, it was reported that he had signed for Barrow in the RFL Championship.
