= Ryan Lannon (rugby league) =

English rugby league footballer

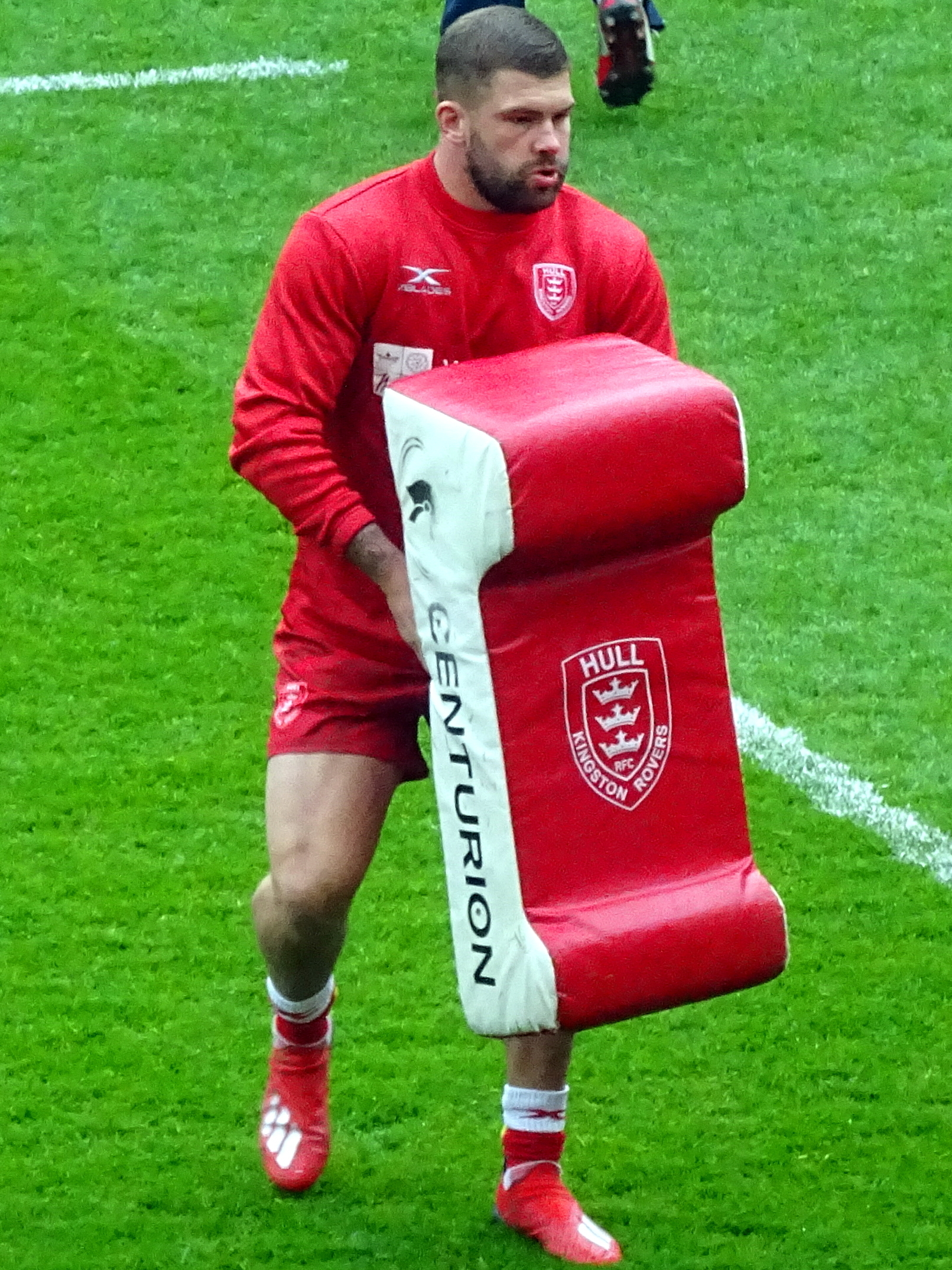

Personal information
- Full name: Ryan Lannon
- Born: 11 January 1996 (age 30) Wigan, Greater Manchester, England
- Height: 5 ft 11 in (1.80 m)
- Weight: 15 st 8 lb (99 kg)

Playing information
- Position: Loose forward, Second-row
Club
Years	Team	Pld	T	G	FG	P
2015–18	Salford Red Devils	54	10	0	0	40
2016(loan)	→ North Wales Crusaders	3	0	0	0	0
2017(loan)	→ Halifax	4	0	0	0	0
2018(loan)	→ Oldham	2	0	0	0	0
2019	Hull Kingston Rovers	8	1	0	0	4
2019(loan)	→ Salford Red Devils	9	1	0	0	4
2020–23	Salford Red Devils	16	0	0	0	0
2023(loan)	→ Swinton Lions	2	0	0	0	0
2023–24	Halifax Panthers	43	3	0	0	12
2024–25	Widnes Vikings	17	2	0	0	8
2025–	Oldham	11	3	0	0	12
	Total	169	20	0	0	80
- Source: As of 4 September 2026
- Relatives: Gareth Hock (cousin)

Ryan Lannon (born 11 January 1996) is an English professional rugby league footballer who plays as a loose forward and second-row forward for Oldham in the RFL Championship.

He has previously played for Salford in the Super League, and on loan from the Red Devils at the North Wales Crusaders and Oldham in League 1 and Halifax in the Kingstone Press Championship. Lannon has also played for Hull Kingston Rovers in the Super League, and on loan from Hull KR at Salford.

== Background ==
Lannon was born in Wigan, Greater Manchester, England. He is the cousin of the rugby league footballer; Gareth Hock. Lannon was a product of the Salford Red Devils' Academy System where he also subsequently captained the side.

== Playing career ==
=== 2015 ===
Lannon made his début for the Salford Red Devils in a Super League match on 12 April 2015, the game was played against the Leeds Rhinos.

=== 2016-18 ===
Lannon has featured for several clubs on a loan basis namely, the North Wales Crusaders (2016), Halifax (2017) and Oldham (2018).

=== 2019 ===
In October 2018, it was announced that Lannon had signed a three-year contract to play for Hull Kingston Rovers commencing in 2019. On 17 February 2019, in a round 3 fixture against the London Broncos, Lannon made his Hull Kingston Rovers début at Craven Park in a 22–12 victory.

=== Widnes Vikings ===
On 30 July 2024 it was reported that he had signed for Widnes Vikings in the RFL Championship on a 1-year deal.

=== Oldham RLFC ===
On 29 April 2025 it was reported that he had signed for Oldham RLFC in the RFL Championship for the remainder of the 2025 season
