= Scott Taylor (rugby league) =

England international rugby league footballer

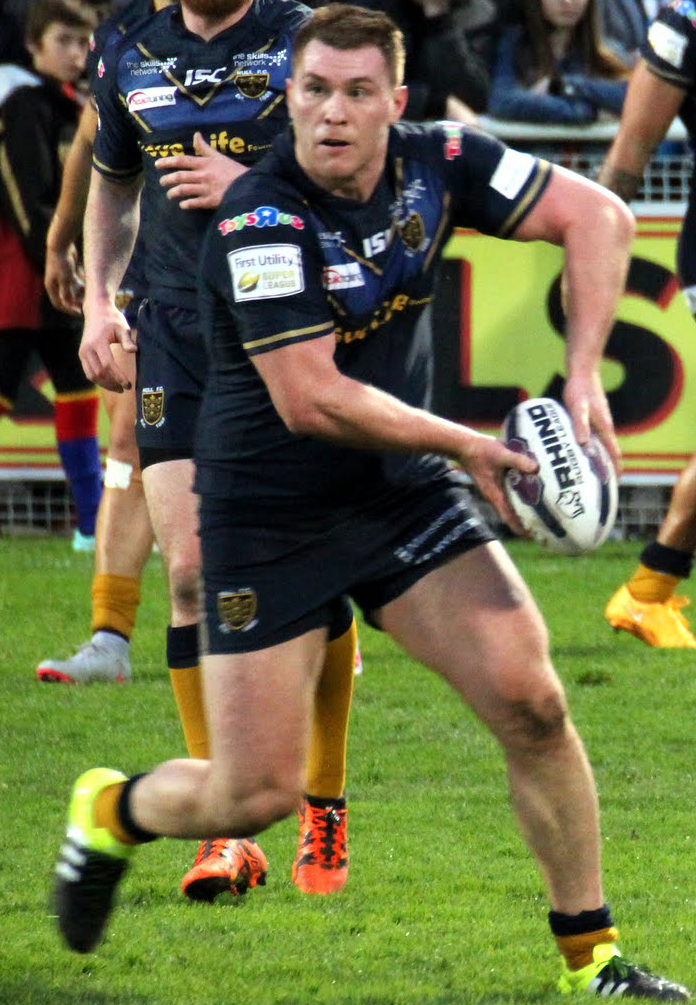

Personal information
- Born: 27 February 1991 (age 35) Hull, England
- Height: 6 ft 3 in (1.91 m)
- Weight: 18 st 8 lb (118 kg)

Playing information
- Position: Prop
Club
| Years | Team | Pld | T | G | FG | P |
|---|---|---|---|---|---|---|
| 2009–12 | Hull Kingston Rovers | 52 | 9 | 0 | 0 | 36 |
| 2013–15 | Wigan Warriors | 54 | 7 | 0 | 0 | 28 |
| 2013(loan) | → Leigh Centurions | 2 | 1 | 0 | 0 | 4 |
| 2015(loan) | → Salford Red Devils | 30 | 7 | 0 | 0 | 28 |
| 2016–23 | Hull FC | 178 | 26 | 1 | 0 | 106 |
| | Total | 316 | 50 | 1 | 0 | 202 |
Representative
| Years | Team | Pld | T | G | FG | P |
| 2012 | England Knights | 2 | 2 | 0 | 0 | 8 |
| 2016–18 | England | 4 | 0 | 0 | 0 | 0 |

Coaching information
Club
| Years | Team | Gms | W | D | L | W% |
| 2025–26 | Goole Vikings | 50 | 20 | 0 | 30 | 40 |
- Source: As of 12 September 2026

Scott Taylor (born 27 February 1991) is an English professional rugby league coach who is an assistant coach at Hull FC in the Super League.

He is a former professional rugby league footballer who played as a prop for Hull F.C., Hull Kingston Rovers and the Wigan Warriors, spending a season on loan from Wigan at the Salford Red Devils in the Super League. He played for the England Knights and England at international level.

== Background ==
Taylor was born in Kingston upon Hull, East Riding of Yorkshire, England.

== Playing career ==
=== Hull Kingston Rovers ===
Taylor made his Hull Kingston Rovers début against Leeds in the 2009 Super League play-offs. On 6 June 2011, he signed a new two-year contract with Rovers, ending rumours linking him with a move to Huddersfield or Hull F.C.

=== Wigan ===
On 16 October 2012, Taylor signed a two-year contract, with the option for a third year, with Wigan for a "substantial settlement fee".

2013 proved a very successful year in Taylor's career. On 24 August, he would start the 2013 Challenge Cup final from interchange, winning the game 16–0 against his boyhood club Hull F.C. at Wembley Stadium.

On 5 October, Taylor started on the bench in Wigan's Super League Grand Final victory over Warrington. Taylor won Wigan a penalty sidestepping before getting caught high by Carvell, Wigan gained important field position from this after previously conceding a barrage of points, thereafter they scored 28 unanswered points to win the game 30–16 at Old Trafford.

He played two games for Leigh Centurions on loan in 2013.

=== Salford ===
In November 2014, Taylor was loaned to Salford after Wigan activated the optional 3rd year of his contract.

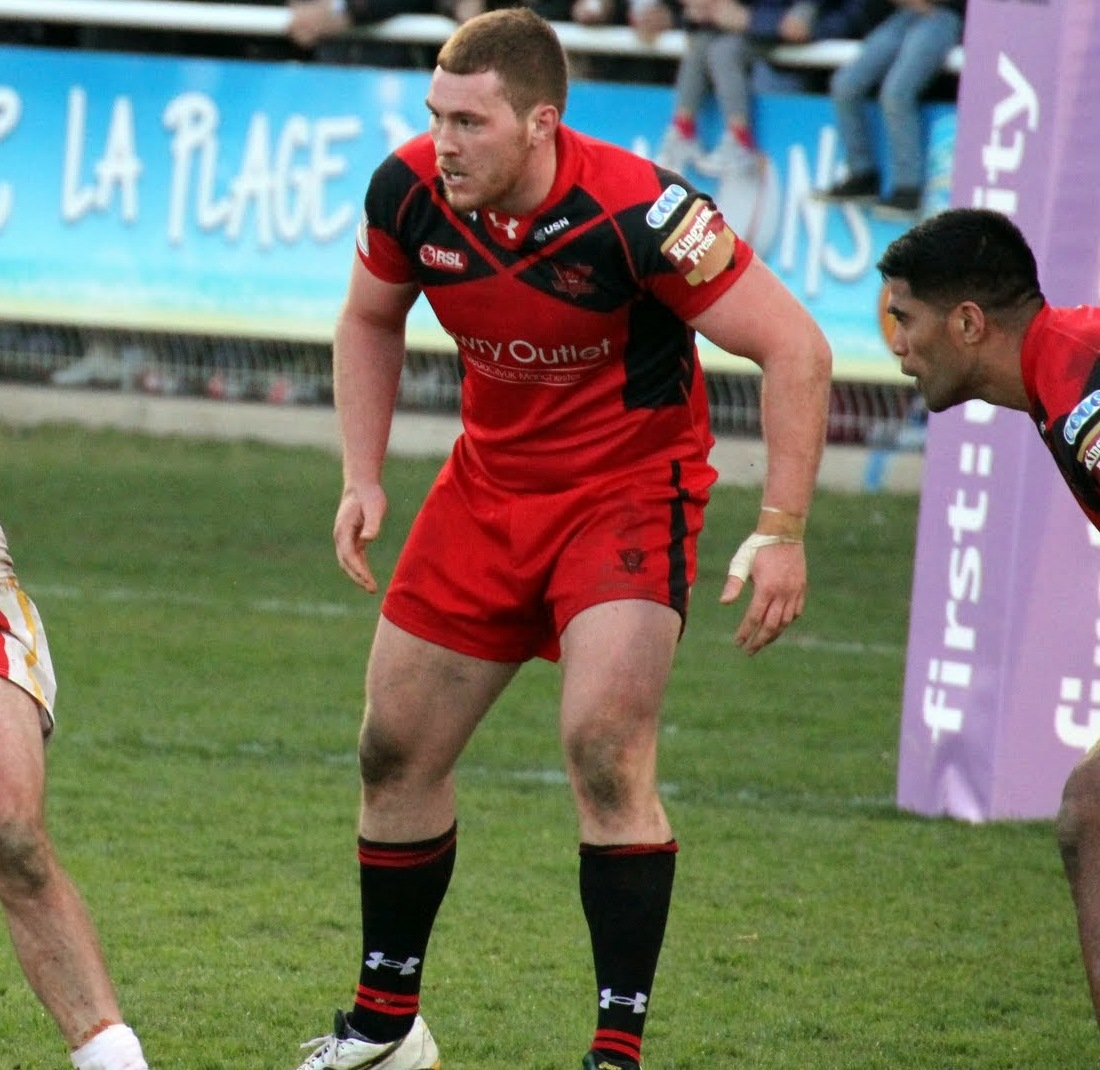
Taylor playing for Salford in Perpignan in 2015

=== Hull F.C. ===
Taylor left Wigan, and returned to his hometown of Hull to play for his boyhood club of Hull F.C. in 2016.

On 27 August 2016, Taylor played in Hull's 12-10 Challenge Cup final win over Warrington, the first time that Hull had won the trophy at Wembley Stadium after eight previous attempts.

Due to his success in 2016, he was included in the Super League Dream Team.

On 26 August 2017, Taylor once again won the Challenge Cup with Hull in an 18–14 win over Wigan at Wembley Stadium.

He played 11 games for Hull F.C. in the 2020 Super League season including the club's semi-final defeat against Wigan.

In 2023, he was awarded a testimonial by the Rugby Football League after making over 300 career appearances. His last game before retirement was the 30-12 away defeat to St Helens on the last day of the 2023 Super League regular season.

== International ==
In October 2016, Taylor was selected in England's 24-man squad for the 2016 Four Nations. He made his international début in a test match against France.

In October 2017 he was selected in the England squad for the 2017 Rugby League World Cup.

On 24 June 2018, Taylor came off the bench in England's victory over New Zealand, which was played at Mile High Stadium, the home ground of Taylor's favourite NFL side, Denver Broncos.

== Coaching ==
=== Goole Vikings ===
On 2 Oct 2024 it was reported that he had been appointed as the head coach of new RFL League 1 side Goole Vikings.

== Honours ==
=== Wigan ===
- Super League Grand Final: (1) 2013
- Challenge Cup: (1) 2013

=== Hull FC ===
- Challenge Cup: (2) 2016, 2017

=== Individual ===
- Super League Dream Team: (1) 2016
