= Jordan Walne =

English rugby league footballer

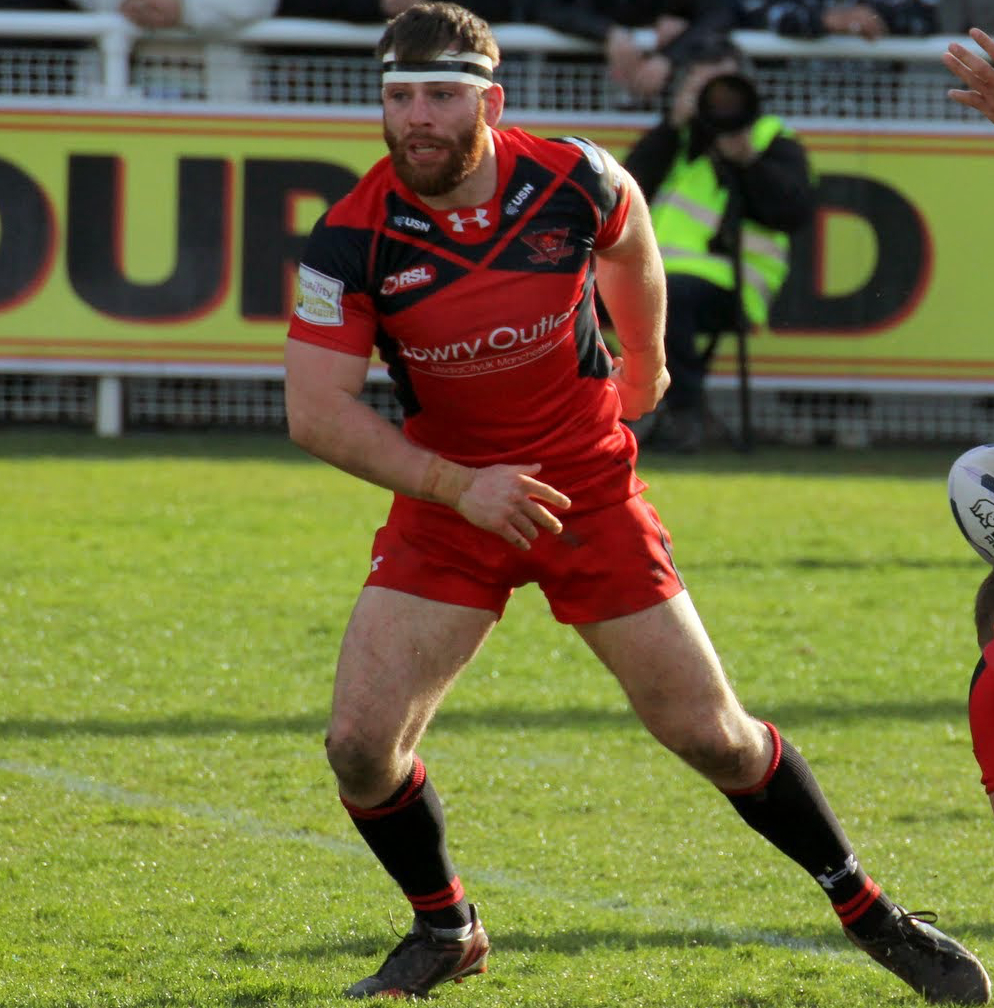

Personal information
- Full name: Jordan Walne
- Born: 28 December 1992 (age 33) Greater Manchester, England
- Height: 6 ft 0 in (182 cm)
- Weight: 15 st 13 lb (101 kg)

Playing information
- Position: Second-row, Loose forward, Prop
Club
Years	Team	Pld	T	G	FG	P
2013–17	Salford Red Devils	58	4	0	0	16
2013(DR)	→ Oldham	1	0	0	0	0
2013(DR)	→ Workington Town	8	3	0	0	12
2016(DR)	→ North Wales Crusaders	2	0	0	0	0
2017(DR)	→ Halifax R.L.F.C.	2	0	0	0	0
2017(DR)	→ Oldham	1	1	0	0	4
2018	Hull Kingston Rovers	8	0	0	0	0
2018(DR)	→ York City Knights	5	1	0	0	4
2018(loan)	→ Leigh Centurions	8	3	0	0	12
2019–22	Barrow Raiders	13	1	0	0	4
	Total	106	13	0	0	52
- Source: As of 1 June 2019
- Relatives: Adam Walne (brother)

Jordan Walne (born 28 December 1992) is an English professional rugby league footballer who plays in the second-row for the Barrow Raiders in the Championship. He has previously played for Hull Kingston Rovers and the Salford Red Devils in the Super League, plus Oldham RLFC on dual-registration.

== Background ==
He is the brother of fellow rugby league footballer, Adam Walne. As an amateur he played for the Leyland Warriors, based at Malt Kiln Fold, Leyland.

== Senior career ==
=== Salford Red Devils (2013-17) ===
Walne made his senior début for Salford on 21 April 2013, in a Challenge Cup match against the Gloucestershire All Golds. Walne made his Super League début on 4 August 2013, in the Salford Red Devils' fixture against Huddersfield.

=== Hull Kingston Rovers (2018) ===
In October 2017, Walne signed a one-year deal to play for Hull Kingston Rovers in the Super League. It was revealed on 10 October 2018, that Walne would be departing Hull Kingston Rovers following a restructure of the club's on field personnel.

=== Leigh Centurions (2018) ===
It was revealed on 26 July 2018, that Walne would spend the remainder of the 2018 rugby league season at Leigh. On a loan basis from his parent-club Hull Kingston Rovers.

Walne was followed to Leigh club by two of his current Hull Kingston Rovers teammates in Will Dagger and Josh Johnson as part of the same loan deal. Walne made his Leigh début against the Sheffield Eagles on 29 July 2018, in a 34-10 triumph in the Championship league competition.

=== Barrow Raiders (2019-22) ===
Ahead of the start of the 2019 rugby league season, Walne signed a one-year contract to play for the Barrow Raiders. Walne made his début for the Barrow Raiders on 3 February 2019, in an 18-22 victory over Batley. Walne scored his first try for the Barrow Raiders on 24 March 2019, during a 26-33 defeat by Swinton. Walne left Barrow Raiders in February 2022.

=== Dual-registration ===
Walne has featured on dual-registration for several clubs, including, Oldham (two separate registrations, 2013 and 2017), Workington Town, North Wales Crusaders, Halifax R.L.F.C. and the York City Knights.
