= List of Wakefield Trinity players =

This is a list of Wakefield Trinity players. Wakefield Trinity are an English rugby league club. As of 31 November 2016, the club has had 1,377 players. Prior to 1895 the club played rugby union and these players are listed separately.

== Post-1895 rugby league players ==
Statistics correct as of 29 March 2026

No	Name	Debut	Last match	Position	Played	Tries	Goals	DG (1pt)	Points	captain (c)	Honours	Cap(s)	Records/Notes
211	John Abbott	1913–Sep	1914–Apr	Wing	9	0	0	0	0				
454	F. Abell	1940–Mar	1940–Mar	Centre	1	0	0	0	0				
296	Len Abraham	1923–Oct	1924–25	Fullback	9	0	0	0	0				from (near) Wakefield, or Len Abraham(s)
331	George Absolom	1927–Mar	1927	Second-row	1	0	0	0	0				
907	Bryan Adams	1982–Aug	1983–84	Second-row	44	16	0	0	48				
??	Sadiq Adebiyi	2022	2022	Prop, Second-row, Loose forward	3	0	0	0	0				Nigerian
609	Wilf Adams	1953–Aug	1959–60	Prop	67	6	0	0	18				
878	Allan Agar	1980–Sep	1980–81	Scrum-half	31	4	3	8	26	(c)			
230	Charles Agar	1919–Apr	1923–Apr	Second-row, Loose forward	53	10	0	0	30				
1309	Paul Aiton	2012	2013	Hooker	47	7	0	0	28				
93	Albert Aldred	1901–Mar	1901–02	Wing	3	1	0	0	3				
327	D. J. Aldridge	1926–Oct	1926–Oct	Scrum-half	1	0	0	0	0				
310	W. Alexander	1924–Oct	1927–28	Second-row	14	0	0	0	0				
726	Tommy Alford	1966–Nov	1967–68	Scrum-half	3	0	0	0	0				
8	Joseph Allchurch	1895–Sep	1897–Nov	Forward	78	1	0	0	3				
1039	Kieran Allen	1993–Feb	1996	Stand-off	25	6	1	0	26				
1382	Mitch Allgood	2017	2017	Prop, Loose forward	8	0	0	0	0				
446	Bill Allinson	1938–Nov	1945–46	Second-row	35	7	0	0	21				
164	Joshua Alsopp	1906–Nov	1906–07	Second-row, Loose forward	2	0	0	0	0				
1293	Kyle Amor	2011	2013	Prop	79	11	0	0	44				
747	Barry Anderson	1968–Sep	1968–69	Hooker	1	0	0	0	0				
1333	Scott Anderson	2014	2016	Prop	53	2	0	0	8				Australian
7	Jack Anderton	1895–Sep	1895–Sep	Halfback	1	0	0	0	0				
1325	Chris Annakin	2013	2019	Loose forward	77	1	0	0	4				
1221	Mark Applegarth	2004	2007	Second-row	27	3	0	0	12				
414	Robert Appleyard	1935–Jan	1939–40	Wing	141	49	0	0	147				
35	Bill Appleyard	1895–Dec	1898–99	Forward	67	1	0	0	3			Yorkshire	
796	John Archer	1974–Jan	1977–78	Wing	83	33	0	0	99				
573	D. Armitage	1948–Dec	1948–Dec	Centre	2	0	0	0	0				
614	Peter Armstead	1953–Dec	1956–57	Second-row	58	6	0	0	18				
255	William Armstrong	1920–Sep	1922–23	Second-row	62	1	0	0	3				
1368	Tinirau Arona	2016	2022	Loose forward, Prop	153	11	0	0	44				
1352	Joe Arundel	2015	2021	Centre, Second-row	113	24	12	0	120				Initially came on loan from Hull FC
608	Norman Ashall	1953–Mar	1955–56	Second-row	25	3	0	0	9				
??	Olly Ashall-Bott	2021	2021	Fullback, Wing	2	1	0	0	4				On loan from Huddersfield Giants
132	Herbert Ashton	1903–Apr	1903–04	Centre	3	0	0	0	0				
344	Robert Ashton	1928–Sep	1931–Dec	Wing, Prop	10	3	0	0	9				
850	Bill Ashurst	1978–Mar	1983–84	Second-row	32	5	15	10	55				
1350	Matty Ashurst	2015	2024	Second-row	230	45	0	0	180				
252	Richard Ashurst	1920–Aug	1920–21	Wing	3	0	0	0	0				
92	Arthur Asquith	1901–Jan	1901–02	Fullback, Wing	10	0	0	0	0				
700	Bernard Asquith	1964–Nov	1964–65	Loose forward	1	0	0	0	0				
847	Peter Astbury	1977–Dec	1977–78	Hooker	4	0	0	0	0				
64	John Atack	1897–Oct	1897–98	Forward	8	0	0	0	0				
1236	Ryan Atkins	2006	2009	Centre	94	49	0	0	196			England	
113	John Atkinson	1902–Sep	1902–03	Forward	1	0	0	0	0				
??	Renouf Atoni	2023	2025	Prop, Loose forward	66	12	0	0	48				New Zealander
704	Jack Austin	1965–Apr	1965–66	Wing	4	3	0	0	9				
145	James Auton	1904–Dec	1912–13	Forward	231	26	0	0	78		CC		
??	Yusuf Aydin	2020	2022	Prop	30	2	0	0	8			Turkey	
739	Colin Backhouse	1967–Nov	1971–72	Stand-off	13	3	0	0	9				
507	Dennis Baddeley	1942–Sep	1951–52	Wing	194	85	3	0 ^²	261		CC	Yorkshire	
598	Peter Baddeley	1952–Feb	1953–54	Second-row	10	0	0	0	0				
1033	Geoff Bagnall	1992–Jan	1993–94	Scrum-half	55	12	1	0	50	(c)			
??	Connor Bailey	2020	2021	Stand-off, Scrum-half, Second-row	5	0	0	0	0				
1065	David Bailey	1994–95	1994–95	Wing	14	5	0	0	20				
??	Luke Bain	2024	2024	Second-row, Loose forward	12	1	0	0	4			Scotland	
146	Charles Baker	1905–Jan	1905–06	Wing	28	9	0	0	27				
61	John Baker	1897–Sep	1897–98	Forward	1	0	0	0	0				
??	Jordan Baldwinson	2018	2019	Prop, Second-row, Loose forward	4	0	0	0	0				
429	Frank Ball	1937–Mar	1939–40	Stand-off	25	4	0	0	12				
754	George Ballantyne	1969–Jan	1978–79	Prop	199	20	0	0	60			Yorkshire	
89	Benny Balmforth	1900–Oct	1901–02	Halfback	27	1	0	0	3				
546	Bob Band	1944–45	1944–45	Hooker	1	0	0	0	0				World War II guest?
558	Billy Banks	1946–Dec	1947–48	Scrum-half	44	12	3	0 ^²	42				
834	Keith Banks	1977–Feb	1977–78	Centre	17	3	0	1	10				
99	Samuel Banks	1901–Oct	1901–02	Forward	18	0	0	0	0				
1086	Frédéric Banquet	1995–96	1997	Wing	18	16	7	0	74			France	
770	David Barends	1970–Dec	1972–73	Wing	66	22	0	0	66				
533	Joe Barker	1944–45	1944–45	Stand-off	1	0	0	0	0				
1196	Mark Barlow	2002	2002	Hooker	1	0	0	0	0				
703	Peter Barlow	1965–Mar	1964–65	Hooker	16	1	0	0	3				
1087	Marcus Barnard	1995–96	1995–96		2	0	0	0	0				
348	William Barnes	1928–Nov	1928–Nov	Loose forward	1	0	0	0	0				
511	… Barraclough	1942–Oct	194?	Wing	6	0	0	0	0				
468	Irving Barraclough	1940–Sep	1940–Nov	Fullback	3	0	0	0	0				Not to be confused with the rugby league fullback who played in the 1940s and 1950s for Featherstone Rovers, Oldham, Castleford and Doncaster; Irvin Barraclough
258	Joe Barraclough	1920–Sep	1923–24	Prop	86	2	0	0	6				
178	John Barton	1909–Mar	1909–10	Forward	24	0	0	0	0				
853	Adrian Barwood	1978–Sep	1980–81	Wing	42	13	0	0	39				From Pontypridd RFC
1088	Andy Bastow	1995–96	1997	Stand-off	4	0	0	0	0				
1376	James Batchelor	2016	2022	Second-row, Loose forward	96	24	13	0	122				
711	Edgar Bate	1965–Oct	1965–66	Prop	18	1	0	0	3				
238	Percy Bates	1919–Aug	1920–21	Wing	21	0	0	0	0				
322	Ted Bateson	1925–Dec	1933	Wing	168	113	1	0 ^²	341				
716	John Bath	1966–Mar	1967–68	Prop	45	0	0	0	0		CF		
306	Billy Batten	1924–Aug	1926–27	Centre	79	6	2	0 ^²	22			Yorkshire	Father of Eric Batten
393	Eric Batten	1933–Sep ^¹	1942–43	Wing	44	20	0	0	60				Son of Billy Batten
714	Kenneth Batty	1966–Jan	1970–71	Wing	184	79	0	0	237		CF		
1178	Nathan Batty	2001	2001	Fullback	2	0	0	0	0				
??	Eddie Battye	2020	2023	Prop, Loose forward	76	1	0	0	4				
889	Ray Baxendale	1981–Sep	1981–82	Second-row	14	1	0	0	3				
349	Herbert Beardshaw	1928–Nov	1929–Mar	Centre	19	1	0	0	3				
192	William Beattie	1911–Dec	1914–Oct	Forward	90	7	6	0 ^²	33	(c)			
100	Harry Beaumont	1901–Oct	1909–10	Forward	203	6	0	0	18		CC		
365	Leslie Bedford	1930–Nov	1932–Dec	Wing	4	0	0	0	0				
31	William Bedford	1895–Oct	1895–96	Halfback	8	1	0	0	3				
1099	Dennis Beecraft	1996	1997	Prop	16	2	0	0	8				
615	Colin Bell	1954–Feb	1956–57	Centre	102	38	0	0	114				
328	G. Bell	1927–Mar	1927–Aug	Loose forward	3	0	0	0	0				
709	John Bell	1965–Sep	1966–67	Second-row	20	7	0	0	21				
929	Nigel Bell	1984–Jan	1996	Scrum-half, Loose forward	357	60	0	0	242	(c)			
775	Peter Bell	1971–Nov	1971–72	Stand-off	10	0	0	0	0				
670	Roy Bell	1961–Mar	1962–63	Stand-off	23	2	2	0 ^²	10				Roy Bell of Castleford?
781	Bryn Bennett	1972–Sep	1973–74	Second-row	9	0	0	0	0				
77	Ernest Bennett	1898–Dec	1913–14	Wing	386	184	64	0 ^²	679		CC	Yorkshire	
1034	Peter Benson	1992–Aug	1992–93	Centre	30	9	37	0	110				
302	E. Bentley	1924–Apr	1923–24	Stand-off	1	0	0	0	0				
233	Thomas "Tom" Best	1919–Apr	1919–Apr	Prop	1	0	0	0	0				
200	Thomas Best	1912–Dec	1912–Dec	Halfback	1	0	0	0	0				
1234	Monty Betham	2006	2006	Hooker, Loose forward	27	2	0	0	8	(c)		New Zealand	
217	John Bettridge	1914–Sep	1915–Apr	Forward	8	0	0	0	0				
1054	Chris Bibb	1993–Dec	1993–94	Fullback	1	0	0	0	0				
1262	Kyle Bibb	2008	2010	Prop	30	2	0	0	8				
1253	Ricky Bibey	2007	2009	Prop	60	1	0	0	4				
395	J. H. Bingham	1933–Oct	1933–Oct	Second-row	1	0	0	0	0				
12	William Binns	1895–Sep	1896–Sep	Forward	2	0	0	0	0				
343	… Bird	1928–Sep	1928–Sep	Centre	1	0	0	0	0				
1194	Deon Bird	2002	2002	Centre	11	1	0	0	4				
1268	Luke Blake	2009	2009	Hooker	2	0	0	0	0				
1210	Matthew Blake	2003	2004	Prop	6	0	0	0	0				
672	David Blakeley	1961–Mar	1963–64	Loose forward	31	7	0	0	21				
221	Walter Blakey	1915–Feb	1920–Apr	Forward	32	1	0	0	3				
1263	Damien Blanch	2008	2010	Wing	52	36	0	0	144			Ireland	
483	L. Blanchard	1941–Mar	1942–May	Prop	31	2	0	0	6				
1245	Matt Blaymire	2007	2011	Fullback	106	30	0	1	121				
683	Dick Bloomfield	1963–May	1963–May	Prop	2	0	1	0 ^²	2				
299	Ernest Blower	1923–Dec	1924–25	Loose forward	51	3	0	0	9				W. Blower? from (near) Featherstone
240	George Boardman	1919–Oct	1919–20	Fullback	3	0	0	0	0				
210	George Bolton	1913–Sep	1914–Mar	Forward	19	0	0	0	0				
743	Joseph Bonnar	1968–Jan	1974–75	Scrum-half	160	32	1	0 ^²	98				
378	Gordon Bonner	1932–Sep	1936–Apr	Fullback, Centre	79	1	31	0 ^²	65				Fullback 2-drop goals against Australia in 1933
563	Denis John Boocker	1947–Apr	1953–54	Wing	221	127	6	0 ^²	393			Wales	
227	Harry Booth	1919–Jan	1923–Apr	Forward	28	0	0	0	0				
168	Herbert Booth	1906–Dec	1907–08	Wing	9	3	0	0	9				
557	John Booth	1946–Nov	1955–56	Prop	257	33	16	0 ^²	131			Yorkshire	
1132	Josh Bostock	1998	1998	Wing	15	16	0	0	64				
715	Eddie Bowden	1966–Feb	1965–66	Hooker	6	0	0	0	0				
503	James "Jim" Bowden	1942–Apr	1943–Feb	Hooker, Second-row	2	0	0	0	0				WWII guest from Bramley, NOT Jim Bowden
??	Josh Bowden	2022	2024	Prop, Loose forward	55	4	0	0	16				
??	Harry Bowes	2020	2023	Hooker, Loose forward	31	0	0	0	0				
879	Harold Box	1980–Sep	1984–85	Fullback	134	20	59	10	191	(c)		Wales, Yorkshire(Other Nationalities Yorkshire at Featherstone Rovers)	
593	Ernest Boyer	1951–Mar	1951–Mar	Stand-off	2	0	0	0	0				
74	Sam Brady	1898–Mar	1897–98	Forward	3	0	0	0	0				
269	Thomas Brannan	1921–Jan	1921–22	Wing	34	14	0	0	42				Surname occasionally mis-spelt as Brannon
439	Leonard "Len" Bratley	1937–Nov	1948–49	Loose forward	236	94	3	0 ^²	288		CC	England, Yorkshire	
788	Roy Bratt	1973–Feb	1983–84	Prop	211	17	0	0	51				Testimonial match 1983
110	Robert Bray	1902–Sep	1902–03	Forward	1	1	0	0	3				
37	Jos Breakwell	1895–Dec	1899–1900	Halfback	134	17	0	0	51				
975	Rowan Brennan	1986–Sep	1986–87	Second-row	15	1	0	0	4				
936	Mark Bridge	1984–Apr	1983–84	Wing	1	0	0	0	0				
618	Keith Bridges	1954–Oct	1956–57	Hooker	36	2	0	0	6				
665	Brian Briggs	1960–Aug	1964–65	Second-row	119	8	0	0	24		CC	Yorkshire	
1133	Carl Briggs	1998	1998	Scrum-half	16	2	0	1	9				
869	David Briggs	1979–Sep	1979–80	Prop	11	0	0	0	0				
1338	Luke Briscoe	2014	2014	Centre	2	0	0	0	0				On loan from Leeds Rhinos
500	Jack Britton	1942–Mar	1942–Apr	Stand-off	3	0	0	0	0				
353	Joe Broadbent	1929–Sep	1929–Sep	Stand-off	3	0	0	0	0				
260	Lewis Broadbent	1920–Nov	1920–21	Centre	2	1	0	0	3				
1181	Paul Broadbent	2002	2002	Prop	24	0	0	0	0	(c)			
376	Edward Brogden	1932–Aug	1933–Sep	Wing	17	1	0	0	3				
677	Ian Brooke	1962–Apr ^¹	1970–71	Centre	183	67	0	0	201	(c)	CFx2 CC	Great Britain	
1170	Justin Brooker	2001	2001	Centre	28	10	0	0	40				
505	Ken Brooks	1942–Sep ^¹	1948–49	Wing	86	31	1	0 ^²	95				
1256	Danny Brough	2008	2020	Scrum-half	83	21	280	10	654			Scotland	Two stints, namely, 2008-10 & 2019-20
542	Edwin Brown	1944–45	1946–47	Centre	10	2	0	0	6				
760	Frank Brown	1969–Sep	1969–70	Centre	19	1	17	0 ^²	37				
827	Graham Brown	1976–Oct	1979–80	Centre	54	5	0	0	15				
548	J. George Brown	1944–45	19??	Second-row	5	0	0	0	0				World War II guest? George Brown?
1050	Paul Brown	1993–Oct	1995–96	Wing	24	8	0	0	32				
268	George Bruce	1921–Jan	1920–21	Halfback	4	0	0	0	0				
172	Ernest Brummitt	1908–Jan	1907–08	Forward	2	0	0	0	0				
1140	Adrian Brunker	1999	1999	Wing	19	6	0	0	24				
1229	Austin Buchanan	2005	2007	Wing	8	3	0	0	12				
91	Arthur Buckley	1900–Nov	1901–02	Forward	9	0	0	0	0				
883	Dennis Buckley	1981–Apr	1984–85	Wing	13	0	6	0	12				
913	John Buckton	1982–Oct	1982–83	Stand-off	3	0	0	0	0				
941	Howard Budby	1984–Oct	1984–85	Prop	1	0	0	0	0				
627	John Bullock	1956–Feb	1956–57	Scrum-half	12	3	0	0	9				
159	… Bulmin	1906–Apr	1905–06	Forward	1	0	0	0	0				
852	John Burke	1978–Apr	1978–79	Prop	24	1	0	0	3				
244	John Burley	1919–Dec	1919–20	Wing	1	0	0	0	0				
905	John Burnage	1982–Apr	1981–82	Centre	1	0	1	0	2				
370	Henry Burnell	1931–Sep	1931–Dec	Utility Back	7	0	0	0	0				
38	John Burnley	1896–Jan	1895–96	Forward	1	0	0	0	0				
922	Alan Burns	1983–Oct	1983–84	Loose forward	9	5	0	0	15				
399	E. Burrows	1934–Jan	1936–37	Scrum-half	60	9	1	0 ^²	29				
179	Arthur Burton	1909–10	1920–Oct	Forward	206	28	9	0 ^²	102			Yorkshire	To Batley
588	Harry Burton	1950–Sep	1956–57	Centre	99	40	19	0 ^²	158				
897	David Busfield	1981–Nov	1981–82	Second-row	3	1	0	0	3				
??	Rob Butler	2022	2023	Prop	9	0	0	0	0				
805	Alan Butterfield	1974–Sep	1978–79	Centre	33	3	0	0	9				
1020	Ged Byrne	1990–Sep	1991–92	Centre	33	10	0	0	40				
266	Thomas Cahill	1921–Jan	1921–22	Prop	3	0	0	0	0				From (near) Sharlston
551	Harry Caldwell	1946–Jan	1945–46	Wing	12	4	0	0	12				
680	Edward Campbell	1962–Aug	1975–76	Prop, Second-row	247	31	8	0 ^²	109		CF		
1230	Liam Campbell	2005	2005	Scrum-half	1	0	0	0	0				
134	Edgar Carbert	1903–Apr	1902–03	Forward	1	0	0	0	0				
473	Ronnie Caress	1940–Oct	1944–Nov	Centre	58	9	0	0	27				
748	Stuart Carlton	1968–Sep	1969–70	Fullback	37	3	56	0 ^²	121				From Normanton
417	J. A. Carr	1935–Oct	1937–38	Scrum-half	25	3	4	0 ^²	17				
248	William Carr	1920–Mar	1919–20	Centre	1	0	0	0	0				
149	Daniel Carroll	1905–Sep	1905–06	Halfback	2	0	0	0	0				
413	Clifford Carter	1934–Dec	1937–38	Hooker	95	7	0	0	21				5 ft 10.5 in (1.79 m), 12 st 10 lb (81 kg), born Newport, Wales
1026	Darren Carter	1991–Mar	1991–92	Hooker	5	0	2	0	4				
979	Phil Cartwright	1986–Nov	1986–87	Wing	7	1	0	0	4				
1127	Garen Casey	1998	1998	Stand-off	32	17	115	4	302				
949	Len Casey	1985–Apr	1985–86	Prop	9	1	0	0	4				
1233	Ned Catic	2006	2007	Prop	49	5	0	0	20				
1380	Mason Caton-Brown	2017	2019	Centre, Wing	37	32	0	0	128				Two stints, namely, 2017-18 & 2019
290	Ned Catterall	1923–Feb	1923–24	Centre	31	11	7	0 ^²	47				
502	Bob Cattlin	1942–Mar	1942–Sep	Loose forward	8	0	0	0	0				World War II guest?
612	Dennis Chalkley	1953–Nov	1954–55	Fullback	8	0	17	0 ^²	34				
625	Leslie Chamberlain	1955–Dec	1960–61	Second-row, Loose forward	110	14	0	0	42		CC		
289	John Chambers	1923–Jan	1922–23	Fullback	1	0	0	0	0				From (near) Wakefield
443	Charles Chester	1938–May	1952–Nov	Second-row	9	1	0	0	3				
811	David Chester	1975–Apr	1975–76	Prop	10	0	0	0	0				
1046	Lee Child	1993–Sep	1995–96	Wing	36	9	0	0	36			Ireland	
254	Ernest Chilton	1920–Aug	1920–21	Scrum-half	6	1	0	0	3				
1041	Gary Christie	1993–Aug	1994–95	Centre	29	4	0	0	16				
633	Terry Clamp	1956–Nov	1959–Jan	Prop	3	1	0	0	3				Older brother of Mick Clamp (Featherstone Rovers Heritage No. 347)
543	Alan Clarke	1944–45	1944–45	Centre	1	0	0	0	0				
713	Geoffrey Clarkson	1965–Dec ^¹	1977–78	Second-row	79	11	2	0 ^²	37		CF	Yorkshire	
1077	Michael Clarkson	1995–96	1997	Second-row	56	14	0	0	56				
875	Peter Clarkson	1980–Apr	1981–82	Second-row	18	0	0	0	0				
859	Terry Clawson	1978–Dec	1978–79	Prop	9	0	2	0	4				
194	William Clay	1912–Jan	1913–Jan	Wing	23	16	0	0	48				
1028	Michael Clements	1991–Sep	1991–92	Stand-off	6	0	0	0	0				
339	Billy Clements	1928–Jan	19??	Prop	14	2	1	0 ^²	8				
599	Colin Clifft	1952–Mar	1956–57	Loose forward	98	11	1	0 ^²	35			England	
356	Leslie Close	1930–Jan	1931–Sep	Second-row	10	1	0	0	3				
718	Tony Clough	1966–Aug	1966–67	Hooker	2	0	0	0	0				
1306	Ben Cockayne	2012	2013	Wing	56	28	2	0	116				
206	Arthur Cockcroft	1913–Apr	1914–Oct	Wing	8	6	0	0	18				or Arthur Cockroft no second 'c'?
884	Gary Cocks	1981–Apr	1986–87	Prop	88	18	0	0	72				
682	Gert Coetzer	1963–Mar	1967–68	Wing	191	122	0	0	366		CFx2 CC		
1025	Mark Colbeck	1991–Jan	1991–92	Scrum-half	6	0	0	0	0				
182	Isaac Cole	1910–Feb	1911–Feb	Forward	19	2	0	0	6				
49	John Cole	1896–Sep	1896–97	Forward	1	0	0	0	0				
297	Tom Coles}	1923–Nov	1928–29	Wing, Prop	97	10	0	0	30				From (near) Ebbw Vale
375	Fred Colledge	1932–Apr	1932–Apr	Second-row	1	0	0	0	0				
1304	Dean Collis	2012	2015	Centre	68	28	0	0	112				
603	Leonard Constance	1952–Sep	1952–53	Stand-off	12	1	0	0	3				
944	Billy Conway	1984–Oct	1997	Hooker	270	33	17	0	166				
995	Mark Conway	1987–Aug	1992–93	Scrum-half	175	54	320	9	865	(c)			Most goals for Wakefield Trinity in a match
1279	Paul Cooke	2010	2010	Stand-off	18	3	36	1	89				
728	Brian Cooper	1966–Dec	1971–72	Loose forward	21	3	0	0	9				
607	Eric Cooper	1953–Feb	1957–58	Wing	156	94	0	0	282				
725	Gary Cooper	1966–Oct	1971–72	Fullback	136	25	0	0	75		CF Harry Sunderland Trophy	(Great Britainnon-Test matches at Featherstone Rovers)	
764	Norman Cooper	1970–Mar	1975–76	Second-row, Loose forward	28	3	0	0	9				
1095	Lamond Copesake	1996	1996	Wing	10	3	0	0	12				
519	Ronnie Copley	1943–Feb	1945–46	Wing	67	46	0	0	138				
197	Walter Copley	1912–Oct	1912–Oct	Wing	1	0	0	0	0				
1090	Jamie Corcoran	1996	1996	Centre	7	1	2	0	8				
826	Michael Corkery	1976–Oct	1976–77	Wing	1	0	0	0	0				
478	G. S. Cottington	1940–Nov	1940–Nov	Hooker	1	0	0	0	0				
914	Paul Coventry	1982–Nov	1984–85	Centre	53	9	0	0	31				
635	Bob Coverdale	1957–Feb	1957–58	Prop	28	1	0	0	3				
891	Mario Cowan	1981–Oct	1981–82	Stand-off	1	0	0	0	0				
82	Harry Coward	1900–Jan	1901–02	Wing	10	0	0	0	0				
978	Bob Cowie	1986–Oct	1986–87	Prop	12	0	0	0	0				
1321	Danny Cowling	2012	2013	Centre	3	0	0	0	0				
561	Doug Cowling	1947–May	19??	Centre	6	2	0	0	6				
137	C. W. Cox	1904–Feb	1905–06	Forward	63	5	0	0	15				
??	Mathieu Cozza	2024	2025	Prop, Loose forward	32	4	0	0	16			France	
948	Tony Craig	1984–Dec	1984–85	Wing, Prop	2	0	0	0	0				
1163	Jason Critchley	2000	2000	Wing, Centre	8	4	0	0	16				
??	Jack Croft	2019	2025	Centre, Second-row	61	11	0	0	44				Two stints, namely, 2019-22 & 2023-25
735	Terry Crook	1967–Oct ^¹	1981–82	Centre	240	43	325	0 ^²	782			Yorkshire	
13	Charles Crosland	1895–Sep	1904–Sep	Forward	205	2	0	0	6				
430	H. Crosland	1937–Mar	1937–Sep	Prop	5	0	0	0	0				
85	Nealy Crosland	1900–Sep	1921–22	Forward	533	22	14	0 ^²	94	(c)	CC	Yorkshire	
842	John Crossley Jr.	1977–Apr	1976–77	Stand-off	2	1	0	0	3				
522	Jim Croston	1943–Sep ^¹	1946–47	Centre	36	14	3	0 ^²	48	(c)	CC	(Great Britain, England, Lancashire at Castleford)	
1141	Kevin Crouthers	1999	1999	Centre	10	1	0	0	4				
1339	Jordan Crowther	2014	2023	Prop	86	4	0	0	16				
556	Jack Cruikshank	1946–Oct	1946	Prop	1	0	0	0	0				
65	Uriah Crummack	1897–Oct	1897–98	Halfback	2	0	0	0	0				
??	Will Dagger	2023	2023	Fullback, Wing, Stand-off	17	2	29	1	67				
103	Fred Dale	1901–Nov	1901–02	Forward	1	0	0	0	0				
1265	Matty Dale	2008	2008	Second-row	2	0	0	0	0				
462	Vic Darlison	1940–Apr	1943–Sep	Hooker	77	0	2	0 ^²	4				
1269	James Davey	2009	2011	Hooker	19	1	0	0	4				
312	Jim Davie	1924–Dec	19??	Hooker	11	0	0	0	0				
705	Alan Davies	1965–Aug	1965–66	Centre	9	0	0	0	0				
32	… Davies	1895–Oct	1895–96	Forward	13	0	0	0	0				
571	John Leighton Davies	1948–Oct	1951–52	Centre	66	42	2	0 ^²	130				
427	Lewis Davies	1936–Dec ^¹	1943–44	Stand-off	24	6	1	0 ^²	20				
776	Steve Davies	1972–Jan	1973–74	Centre	10	2	0	0	6				
325	Tom Davies	1926–Sep	1932–Oct	Centre	146	27	1	0 ^²	83				
959	Tom Davies	1985–Oct	1985–86	Second-row	2	0	0	0	0				
1081	Brad Davis	1995–96 season ^¹	2001	Stand-off	118	45	151	13	495	(c)			
587	Derek Davis	1950–Sep	195?	Fullback	8	0	6	0 ^²	12				
158	Harry Dawson	1906–Apr	1907–08	Halfback	2	0	0	0	0				
21	R. Dawson	1895–Sep	1897–98	Forward	61	0	0	0	0				
10	John Day	1895–Sep	1895–Sep	Forward	2	0	0	0	0				
877	Terry Day	1980–Sep	1981–82	Centre	40	13	0	0	39	(c)			
482	Mel De Lloyd	1941–Mar	1941–May	Stand-off	9	0	3	0 ^²	6				
1285	Chris Dean	2011	2011	Centre	21	9	0	0	36				
1213	Jason Demetriou	2004	2010	Centre	187	51	2	0	208	(c)			
508	Jack Desborough	1942–Sep	1943–44	Prop	36	2	0	0	6				
76	George Devey	1898–Oct	1898–99	Wing	1	0	0	0	0				
105	Joe Dews	1902–Feb	1901–02	Wing	4	4	0	0	12				
323	Thomas Dews	1926–Feb	1926–Oct	Centre	8	2	0	0	6				
247	John William Dey	1919–Dec	1919–20	Centre	5	0	0	0	0				
854	Steve Diamond	1978–Sep ^¹	1986–87	Centre	122	20	264	4	593			Wales	
882	Alan Dickinson	1981–Apr	1980–81	Prop	5	0	0	0	0				
857	Wayne Dimmock	1978–Oct	1978–79	Hooker	1	0	0	0	0				
1122	Gary Divorty	1997–Jun	1997	Loose forward	11	1	1	1	7				
205	Albert Dixon	1913–Mar	1915–Mar	Forward	77	1	0	0	3				
102	Tommy Dixon	1901–Oct	1906–07	Halfback	128	19	3	0 ^²	65				
183	Thomas Dixon	1910–Mar	1911–Apr	Forward	6	2	0	0	6				
30	Robert Dolan	1895–Oct	1896–97	Wing	16	1	0	0	3				
701	Noel Dolton	1964–Dec	1965–66	Prop	24	1	0	0	3				
1215	Sid Domic	2004	2005	Centre	51	33	0	0	132				
295	Harry Dooler	1923–Oct	1924–25	Prop	38	1	0	0	3				From (near) Sharlston
460	Henry Dooler	1940–Apr	1940–Apr	Stand-off	1	0	0	0	0				
1165	Dane Dorahy	2000	2001	Scrum-half	18	4	19	1	55				
650	Ivor Dorrington	1958–Nov	1959–60	Second-row	12	1	0	0	3				South Africa
985	Ian Douglas	1987–Jan	1989–90	Second-row	55	5	0	0	20				
463	Mick Downey	1940–Apr	1940–May	Stand-off	3	2	0	0	6				
??	Thomas Doyle	2024	present	Hooker	34	5	0	0	20				
1257	Brad Drew	2008	2010	Hooker	40	8	14	1	61				
1022	Nick Du Toit	1990–Sep	1990–91	Second-row	23	2	0	0	8				
11	Joseph Ducker	1895–Sep	1896–Oct	Forward	7	0	0	0	0				
246	John Duckworth	1919–Dec	1919–20	Wing	20	2	0	0	6				
569	John Duggan	1948–Sep	1951–52	Wing	108	70	0	0	210			Yorkshire	
71	John William Durham	1898–Jan	1899–1900	Forward	48	2	0	0	6				
1051	Steve Durham	1993–Oct	1994–95	Prop	24	2	0	0	8				
279	Thomas Durkin	1921–Oct	1922–23	Forward	40	6	0	0	18				
262	Stanley Dutton	1920–Dec	1920–21	Wing	1	0	0	0	0				
57	Marseden Dyson	1897–Mar	1896–97	Wing	3	0	0	0	0				
1074	Barry Eaton	1995–96	1995–96	Scrum-half	13	3	24	1	61				
515	Charlie Eaton	1942–Dec	194?	Fullback	3	0	4	0 ^²	8				World War II guest?
??	Josh Eaves	2021	2021	Hooker	3	0	0	0	0				On loan from St Helens
899	Graham Eccles	1982–Jan	1982–83	Second-row	20	0	0	0	0				
428	Bill Eddom	1937–Feb	1944–45	Prop	157	14	0	0	42				
915	Phil Eden	1983–Jan	1993–94	Centre	250	65	0	0	267				
135	Joseph Edwards	1903–Sep	1904–05	Forward	34	0	0	0	0				
1206	Olivier Elima	2003	2007	Second-row	93	13	0	0	52				
1000	Steve Ella	1988–Aug	1988–89	Stand-off	20	9	32	2	102	(c)			
1317	Andy Ellis	2012	2012	Hooker	10	0	0	0	0				
242	Clarence Ellis	1919–Nov	1919–20	Second-row	3	0	0	0	0				
1152	Gareth Ellis	1999	2004	Centre	112	25	2	0	104	(c)		Great Britain, England, Yorkshire	
778	Ian Ellis	1972–Apr	1976–77	Second-row, Loose forward	73	7	36	3 ^²	96				
139	John Emmerson	1904–Sep	1906–07	Centre	56	4	0	0	12				
750	Ken Endersby	1968–Sep	1973–74	Second-row	75	5	0	0	15				
837	Mark Endersby	1977–Mar	1977–78	Wing	16	2	60	0	126				
1367	Anthony England	2016	2019	Prop	86	2	0	0	8				
??	Morgan Escaré	2019	2022	Fullback	7	2	0	0	8			France	Two separate loan spells, namely, 2019 from Wigan Warriors & 2022 from Salford Red Devils
??	Sam Eseh	2022	2023	Prop	15	0	0	0	0				
655	John Etty	1959–Apr	1960–61	Wing	57	28	0	0	84		CC		
63	Arthur Evans	1897–Sep	1899–1900	Halfback	28	2	0	0	6				
55	Edward Evans	1896–Dec	1897–98	Forward	40	1	0	0	3				
954	Graham Evans	1985–Sep	1985–86	Centre	4	0	0	0	0				
1238	James Evans	2006	2006	Centre	6	3	0	0	12				
696	Ken Evans	1964–Sep	1964–65	Prop	1	1	0	0	3				
808	Paul Evans	1975–Mar	1975–76	Prop	18	0	0	0	0				
589	Ronald Evans	1950–Nov	1955–56	Scrum-half	72	12	1	0 ^²	38				
641	Sam Evans	1957–Dec	1959–60	Prop	28	1	0	0	3				
973	Steve Evans	1986–Aug	1986–87	Centre	15	4	2	0	20				
56	Tom Evans	1897–Jan	1896–97	Halfback	7	1	0	0	3				
352	Mick Exley	1929–Apr	1947–Apr	Second-row	449	83	1	0 ^²	251	(c)	CC	Great Britainnon-Test matchesEngland, Yorkshire	
9	Arthur Eyre	1895–Sep	1897–Feb	Forward	44	4	0	0	12				
332	Harry Eyre	1927–May	1927–Oct	Forward	2	0	0	0	0				
??	Caius Faatili	2025	present	Prop	27	8	0	0	32				New Zealander
1343	Jacob Fairbank	2014	2014	Second-row	4	0	0	0	0				
390	Herbert Farrar	1933–Feb	1935–36	Centre	67	14	0	0	42				
17	R. Farrar	1895–Sep	1896–Mar	Wing	8	0	0	0	0				
1150	Vince Fawcett	1999	1999	Wing	14	2	0	0	8				
1177	Chris Feather	2001	2005	Prop	65	9	0	0	36				
185	Charlie Fellowes	1910–Dec	1920–Apr	Halfback	69	12	2	0 ^²	40				
872	Dale Fennell	1980–Feb	1981–82	Scrum-half	28	4	1	3	17				
1248	Dale Ferguson	2007	2011	Second-row	57	12	0	0	48				
1243	Brett Ferres	2007	2008	Second-row	41	7	6	0	40				
585	Ray Fewster	1950–Apr	1955–56	Wing	55	28	0	0	84				
335	Harry Field	1927–Oct	1936–Feb	Prop, Hooker	255	19	0	0	57				
1149	Jamie Field	1999	2006	Second-row	212	23	0	0	92				
1207	Mark Field	2003	2007	Fullback	37	3	0	0	12				
1372	David Fifita	2016	2023	Prop	153	28	3	0	116				The ‘Big Bopper’. Two stints, namely, 2016-22 & 2023
824	David Finch	1976–Aug	1976–77	Wing	9	2	0	0	6				David Finch?
1220	Liam Finn	2004	2018	Scrum-half	82	8	253	0	538				Two stints, namely, 2004-05 & 2016-18
208	Herbert Finnigan	1913–Sep	1914–Mar	Centre	89	2	0	0	6				
616	Albert Firth	1954–Apr	1962–63	Prop, Second-row	217	70	0	0	210		CCx2	Yorkshire	
80	Frederick Firth	1899–Oct	1900–01	Centre	23	3	1	0 ^²	11				
825	Howard Firth	1976–Sep	1976–77	Wing	16	3	0	0	9				
749	Roy Firth	1968–Sep	1968–69	Hooker	2	0	0	0	0				
1131	Andy Fisher	1998	2000	Second-row	67	11	0	0	44				
840	Andy Fletcher	1977–Mar ^¹	1988–89	Wing	205	88	0	0	282			Yorkshire	
536	Arthur Fletcher	1944–45	1956–57	Stand-off	303	114	4	0 ^²	350	(c)		Yorkshire	
791	Max Fletcher	1973–Mar	1974–75	Fullback	11	0	0	0	0				
409	Alan Flowers	1934–Oct	1945–46	Second-row	182	23	2	0 ^²	73				Non-playing reserve forward for England against Wales at Watersheddings, Oldham on Saturday 9 November 1940, 5 ft 11 in (1.80 m), 13 st 6 lb (85 kg), born Cairo
1036	Adrian Flynn	1992–Oct	1994–95	Wing	59	13	0	0	52				
865	Stephen Flynn	1979–Apr	1979–80	Wing	4	2	0	0	6				
1066	Wayne Flynn	1994–95	1996	Centre	50	11	0	0	44				
1096	Lino Foai	1996	1996	Wing	12	9	1	0	38				
516	M. Foley	1943–Jan	194?	Loose forward	6	0	0	0	0				
??	Tom Forber	2023	2023	Hooker	2	0	0	0	0				On loan from Wigan Warriors
1097	Mike Ford	1996	1997	Scrum-half	24	6	0	0	24	(c)			
318	Thomas Fordham	1925–Sep	1926–Apr	Wing	6	0	0	0	0				From (near) Wakefield
576	Des Foreman	1949–Jan	1949–50	Second-row	45	8	38	0 ^²	100				
1048	Mike Forshaw	1993–Sep	1994–95	Loose forward	44	8	0	0	32	(c)			
876	Colin Forsyth	1980–Aug	1982–83	Prop	35	12	0	0	36				
40	Sam Foster	1896–Jan	1895–96	Wing	16	4	1	0 ^²	14				
744	Tom Fowler	1968–Jan	1967–68	Second-row	1	0	0	0	0				
710	Don Fox	1965–Sep	1969–70	Prop, Loose forward	117	18	84	0 ^²	222		CFx2 Lance Todd Trophy	Yorkshire	
629	Neil Fox	1956–Apr	1973–74	Centre, Second-row, Loose forward	574	272	1836	0 ^²	4488	(c)	CFx2 CCx3 Lance Todd Trophy	Great Britain, England, Yorkshire	Most goals in a season, points in a season, most tries in a career, goals in a career, & points in a career for Wakefield Trinity
723	Peter Fox	1966–Sep	1966–67	Prop	1	0	0	0	0				
1240	Peter Fox	2007 ^¹	2014	Wing	89	45	0	0	0				
994	Phil Fox	1987–Aug	1989–90	Wing	60	31	0	0	124				
384	G. D. France	1932–Nov	1933–Dec	Scrum-half	7	0	0	0	0				
163	James France	1906–Oct	1906–07	Forward	3	0	0	0	0				
283	Jim France	1922–Feb	1921–22	Fullback	1	0	0	0	0				
??	Romain Franco	2023	2024	Wing	9	7	0	0	28			France	
416	Nichol Fraser	1935–Sep	1936–37	Centre, Scrum-half	18	3	0	0	9				
887	Nigel French	1981–Sep	1981–82	Centre	4	0	0	0	0				
1193	Andrew Frew	2002	2002	Centre	21	8	0	0	32				
122	John Frisby	1903–Jan	1902–03	Fullback	1	0	0	0	0				
1035	Darren Fritz	1992–Sep	1992–93	Second-row	21	9	0	0	36				
572	Don Froggett	1948–Nov	1958–59	Centre	219	94	1	0 ^²	284	(c)		England, Yorkshire	
1045	Matt Fuller	1993–Sep ^¹	1998	Loose forward	52	6	0	0	24	(c)			
??	Luke Gale	2023	2024	Stand-off, Scrum-half	35	14	2	1	61				Upon retiring stayed at Wakefield Trinity as assistant coach
68	George Gallimore	1898–Jan	1899–1900	Forward	41	2	0	0	6				
4	William Gameson	1895–Sep	1895–Oct	Centre	7	0	0	0	0				
839	Bob Gant	1977–Mar	1976–77	Second-row	1	0	0	0	0				
794	Tony Garforth	1973–Oct	1973–74	Second-row	9	1	0	0	3				
28	Charles Garner	1895–Oct	1897–98	Centre	2	0	0	0	0				
188	Jack Garrity	1911–Sep	1912–Jan	Fullback	9	0	0	0	0				
79	James Garrity	1899–Sep	1900–01	Forward	48	3	0	0	9				
708	David Garthwaite	1965–Aug	1969–70	Wing	64	23	0	0	96				
??	Lee Gaskell	2022	2023	Centre, Fullback, Stand-off	24	4	2	0	20				
912	Paul Gearey	1982–Oct	1985–86	Second-row	39	6	0	0	24				
369	Sam Gee	1931–Sep	1932–Dec	Hooker	44	1	0	0	3				
1078	Steve Georgallis	1995–96	1995–96	Stand-off	17	5	0	0	20				
1250	Luke George	2007	2011	Wing	44	25	0	0	100				
828	Geoff Gerard	1976–Oct	1976–77	Centre	10	1	0	0	3				
943	Graham Gerard	1984–Oct	1985–86	Centre	29	13	0	0	52				
487	Harry Germaine	1941–Oct	1941–Oct	Centre	2	1	0	0	3				
504	… Gibbons	1942–Apr	194?	Second-row	2	0	0	0	0				
1370	Ashley Gibson	2016	2017	Wing, Centre	12	5	0	0	20				
308	Thomas Gibson	1924–Sep	1928–29	Hooker	114	6	0	0	18				
??	Tony Gigot	2020	2021	Centre, Fullback, Stand-off, Scrum-half	7	1	6	0	16			France	
1063	Ian Gildart	1994–95	1994–95	Second-row	25	0	0	0	0				
931	Lindsay Gill	1984–Jan	1983–84	Second-row	5	0	0	0	0				
1345	Lee Gilmour	2014	2014	Second-row, Centre	13	2	0	0	8				On loan from Castleford Tigers
974	Tom Gittins	1986–Aug	1986–87	Second-row	16	1	0	0	4				
1001	John Glancy	1988–Aug	1993–94	Prop	141	5	0	0	20				
1278	Ben Gledhill	2010	2011	Prop	17	0	0	0	0				
220	Hedley Gledhill	1915–Jan	1915–Apr	Forward	6	0	0	0	0				
1252	Sean Gleeson	2007	2010	Centre	78	23	0	0	92			Ireland	
298	Charles H. Glossop	1923–Nov	1931–32	Second-row	287	54	0	0	162			England	
334	Bernard Glover	1927–Oct	19??	Stand-off	10	2	0	0	6				
48	Herbert Glover	1896–Sep	1896–97	Wing	4	0	0	0	0				
800	Steve Gobey	1974–Apr	1973–74	Centre	4	0	2	0 ^²	4				
1018	Richard Goddard	1990–Aug	1993–94	Centre	53	10	17	0	74				
717	John Godfrey	1966–Apr	1971–72	Second-row	36	3	0	0	9				
1119	Stuart Godfrey	1997–May	1997	Wing, Hooker	13	3	0	0	12				
1332	Pita Godinet	2014	2015	Scrum-half	41	14	3	0	62				New Zealander
291	Herbert Godley	1923–Mar	1924–25	Prop, Loose forward	12	0	0	0	0				From (near) Outwood
547	Joe Golby	1944–45	194?	Hooker	5	0	0	0	0				World War II guest?
1242	Jason Golden	2007	2008	Prop	37	2	0	0	8				
272	Arthur Goldthorpe	1921–Sep	1921–22	Fullback	1	0	0	0	0				
5	John Goldthorpe	1895–Sep	1895–Sep	Wing	3	0	0	0	0				Related to Albert Goldthorpe (et al.)?
46	John Goodaire	1896–Sep	1896–97	Wing	5	1	0	0	3				
125	Charles Goodall	1903–Jan	1903–04	Utility Back	7	0	0	0	0				
529	W. Goodall	1943–Mar	1952–53	Prop	19	0	0	0	0				
401	Herbert Goodfellow	1934–Mar	1950–51	Scrum-half	434	114	12	0 ^²	366	(c)	CC	England, Yorkshire	
186	Harold Goodison	1911–Jan	1915–Apr	Wing	13	1	0	0	3				
797	Neil Goodwin	1974–Feb	1977–78	Prop	54	2	0	0	6				
83	John Goodyear	1900–Sep	1902–03	Centre	63	15	31	0 ^²	107				
727	Tom Gorman	1966–Nov	1966–67	Scrum-half	6	1	0	0	3				
391	H. Gorner	1933–Mar	1933–Mar	Wing	1	0	0	0	0				
282	Bernard Gould	1922–Feb	1925–26	Prop	102	6	1	0 ^²	20				
1162	Bobbie Goulding	2000	2000	Scrum-half	13	3	25	3	65				
1330	Bobbie Goulding Jr.	2013	2013	Stand-off	3	0	1	0	2				
249	Willie Gourlay	1920–Apr	1919–20	Hooker, Second-row	2	0	0	0	0				
1002	Mark Graham	1988–Aug	1988–89	Second-row	14	2	0	0	8	(c)			
120	John Grant	1902–Dec	1902–03	Forward	3	0	0	0	0				
560	Arthur Gray	1947–Apr	1949–50	Fullback	15	1	0	0	3				
1136	Kevin Gray	1998	1998	Wing	6	2	2	0	12				
263	Gladstone Green	1921–Jan	1920–21	Fullback	1	0	0	0	0				
??	Chris Green	2019	2021	Prop, Loose forward	33	1	0	0	4				
972	Jimmy Green	1986–Apr	1986–87	Scrum-half	14	0	0	0	0				
971	Steve Green	1986–Mar	1985–86	Stand-off	8	2	0	0	8				
567	Ron Greenaway	1948–Sep	19??	Loose forward	7	4	0	0	12				
90	Edward Greening	1900–Oct	1903–04	Centre	52	16	1	0 ^²	50				
674	Colin Greenwood	1961–Aug	1963–64	Centre, Stand-off	75	32	0	0	96		CC	South Africa	
858	Brian Gregory	1978–Oct	1978–79	Second-row	18	1	0	0	3				
489	Francis Gregory	1941–Oct	1941–Oct	Prop	1	0	0	0	0				World War II guest?
1251	Maxime Grésèque	2007	2007	Scrum-half	3	0	0	0	0				
1209	Darrell Griffin	2003	2006	Prop	97	9	3	0	42			England	Brother of George & Josh Griffin
1353	George Griffin	2015	2015	Prop, Second-row	5	0	0	0	0				On loan from Salford Red Devils; Brother of Darrell & Josh Griffin
195	John Griffin	1912–Apr	1912–Oct	Halfback	5	0	0	0	0				
1260	Josh Griffin	2008 ^¹	2025	Centre	69	32	20	0	168				Three stints, namely, 2008, 2011 & 2023-25; Brother of George & Darrell Griffin
1130	Matt Griffin	1998	1998	Fullback	1	0	0	0	0				
29	Enoch Griffiths	1895–Oct	1895–96	Centre	15	0	0	0	0				
539	Frank Griffiths	1944–45	1944–45	Second-row	1	0	0	0	0				
372	J. B. Griffiths	1932–Feb	1932–Apr	Wing	9	3	0	0	9				
1083	Carl Grigg	1995–96	1997		47	25	0	0	100				
1259	Scott Grix	2008	2009	Utility Back	46	20	0	0	80			Ireland	
871	Mark Guest	1979–Nov	1981–82	Centre	39	3	0	0	0				
??	Titus Gwaze	2019	2020	Prop	5	0	0	0	0				Zimbabwean
270	Bob Habron	1921–Jan	1921–22	Stand-off	6	2	0	0	6				
1381	Dean Hadley	2017	2017	Second-row, Loose forward	22	2	0	0	8				On loan from Hull FC
983	Gary Haggarty	1987–Jan	1989–90	Centre	35	7	0	0	28				
681	Bob Haigh	1962–Sep	1970–71	Second-row	250	58	0	0	174	(c)	CFx2	Great Britain, England, Yorkshire	
610	Frank Haigh	1953–Aug	1959–60	Second-row	84	11	0	0	33				
415	J. A. Haigh	1935–Jan	1936–May	Centre	5	1	0	0	3				
999	Paul Haigh	1988–Apr	1987–88	Hooker	1	0	0	0	0				
843	Gary Hale	1977–Apr	1977–78	Centre	4	0	8	0	16				
421	Harold Hale	1936–Apr	1936–Apr	Forward	2	0	0	0	0				
53	William Hale	1896–Nov	1903–04	Forward	225	11	0	0	33				
535	Harold Haley	1944–45	194?	Hooker	11	1	0	0	3			Yorkshire	World War II guest?
??	Corey Hall	2022	present	Centre, Second-row	51	14	0	0	56				Two stints, namely, 2022-23 & 2025-present
1347	Craig Hall	2015	2016	Wing, Centre, Fullback, Stand-off	40	17	41	0	150				
965	Dave Hall	1986–Jan	1985–86	Stand-off	3	0	0	0	0				Dave Hall?
753	Peter Hall	1968–Oct	1968–69	Prop	1	0	0	0	0				
1266	Dave Halley	2009	2009	Fullback	5	4	0	0	16				
1186	Danny Halliwell	2002	2002	Wing	3	0	0	0	0				
989	Steve Halliwell	1987–Mar	1987–88	Centre	40	16	4	0	72				
1200	Colum Halpenny	2003	2006	Fullback	111	37	0	0	148				
494	Ray Hamer	1942–Jan	1942–Jan	Stand-off	1	0	0	0	0				World War II guest?
??	Caleb Hamlin-Uele	2025	present	Prop	48	11	0	0	44				New Zealander
406	Harry Hammond	1934–Sep	1935–36	Prop	16	0	0	0	0				
209	Walter Hammond	1913–Sep	1913–Oct	Halfback	6	0	0	0	0				
??	Ryan Hampshire	2018	2021	Fullback, Wing, Stand-off, Scrum-half	85	28	129	3	373				
933	Paul Hampson	1984–Mar	1983–84	Wing	4	0	0	0	0				
1355	Jordan Hand	2015	2015	Prop	2	0	0	0	0				On loan from St Helens
1167	Paul Handforth	2000	2004	Scrum-half	66	11	13	0	70			Ireland	
755	Tony Handforth	1969–Aug	1973–74	Hooker	101	5	0	0	15				
802	Raymond Handscombe	1974–Sep	1978–79	Hooker	132	16	0	2	49				
1042	Lee Hanlan	1993–Aug	1995–96	Stand-off	43	6	7	2	40				
286	Bob Hannah	1922–Oct	1922–23	Loose forward	1	0	0	0	0				
1176	Lionel Harbin	2001	2001	Hooker	1	0	0	0	0				
988	Kevin Harcombe	1987–Mar	1990–91	Fullback	67	6	228	1	481				
464	Tom Hardy	1940–May	1943–Dec	Stand-off	27	8	0	0	24				
1222	Dan Hardy	2007	2007	Centre, Loose forward	5	1	0	0	4			Ireland	
761	Kevin Harkin	1969–Oct ^¹	1985–86	Scrum-half	111	16	3	0	55				
762	Terry Harkin	1969–Oct	1969–70	Wing	2	1	0	0	3				
880	Billy Harris	1980–Dec ^¹	1983–84	Prop	59	2	0	0	6				
114	William Harris	1902–Oct	1902–03	Halfback	27	2	0	0	6				
684	Alan Harrison	1963–May	1963–May	Second-row	1	0	0	0	0				
1377	Ben Harrison	2016	2016	Loose forward, Prop, Second-row	3	0	0	0	0				On loan from Warrington Wolves
911	Chris Harrison	1982–Oct	1983–84	Centre	36	11	0	0	35				
605	Derrick Harrison	1953–Jan	1959–60	Prop	154	20	0	0	60				
771	Peter Harrison	1971–Apr	1971–72	Second-row	39	5	0	0	15				
377	W. H. Harrison	1932–Aug	1932–Aug	Prop	1	0	0	0	0				
1385	James Hasson	2017	2017	Centre	4	0	0	0	0			Ireland	
1190	Phil Hassan	2002	2002	Centre	10	0	0	0	0				
692	Rudi Hasse	1964–Apr	1964–65	Second-row	8	2	0	0	6				
1174	Tom Haughey	2001	2002	Second-row	21	0	0	0	0				
668	Roy Hawksley	1961–Jan	1965–66	Hooker	23	2	0	0	6				
719	David Hawley	1966–Aug	1971–72	Loose forward	161	18	0	0	54		CF		
568	G. Heeley	1948–Sep		Scrum-half	4	0	0	0	0				
766	John Hegarty	1970–Aug	1973–74	Centre	77	28	0	0	84				
1080	Phil Hellewell	1995–96	1995–96	Centre	4	1	0	0	4				
495	Frank Hemingway	1942–Jan	1942–Jan	Prop	1	0	0	0	0				
229	Harold Henderson	1919–Apr	1924–May	Stand-off	4	0	0	0	0				From (near) Sharlston
1228	Kevin Henderson	2005	2011	Centre, Second-row	127	12	0	0	48			Scotland	
932	Paul Hendry	1984–Feb	1987–88	Centre	29	4	3	0	22				
455	Ernie Herbert	1940–Mar	1942–Jan	Stand-off	5	0	0	0	0				World War II guest?
359	Sam Herberts	1930–Mar	1940–Jun	Centre, Stand-off	198	28	8	0 ^²	100				Stand-off against Australia in 1933
165	Joseph Herrington	1906–Nov	1906–07	Forward	1	0	0	0	0				
317	Joseph Hesketh	1925–Aug	19??	Prop	10	1	0	0	3				
896	David Heslop	1981–Nov	1982–83	Hooker	30	5	0	0	15				
786	Gary Hetherington	1973–Jan	1974–Dec	Hooker, Loose forward	5	0	4	0 ^²	8				
1079	Cavill Heugh	1995–96	1995–96	Prop	4	1	0	0	4				
354	H. Hewitt	1929–Sep	1929–Nov	Second-row	11	0	0	0	0				
??	Sam Hewitt	2023	2023	Centre, Prop, Second-row	7	0	0	0	0				On loan from Huddersfield Giants
967	Ricky Hewland	1986–Mar	1985–86	Prop	1	1	0	0	4				
271	Henry Hewson	1921–Jan	1923–24	Second-row	39	0	1	0 ^²	2				
763	Alan Hibbitt	1969–Nov	1969–70	Hooker	1	0	0	0	0				
1298	Jarrad Hickey	2011	2011	Prop	8	2	0	0	8				
528	A. Hickman	1944–Feb	194?	Centre	3	0	0	0	0				
956	Kevin Hickman	1985–Sep	1986–87	Scrum-half	26	4	0	0	16				
1071	Paul Hicks	1994–95	1999	Prop	32	2	0	0	8				
1059	Simon Hicks	1994–Apr	1998	Second-row	50	6	0	0	24				
526	James Higgins	1944–Jan	1953–54	Second-row	221	14	0	0	42		CC		
1296	Liam Higgins	2011	2011	Prop	16	0	0	0	0				
??	Noah High		present	Prop, Loose forward			0	0					
321	John Higson	1925–Oct	19??	Second-row	59	3	0	0	9				
336	Leonard Higson	1927–Nov	1934–Apr	Prop	210	26	2	0 ^²	82			England, Yorkshire	
752	Tom Hill	1968–Oct	1971–72	Hooker	103	9	4	0 ^²	35				Signed from Whitehaven
759	Jack Hirst	1969–Sep	1969–70	Prop	4	0	0	0	0				
1010	John Hirst	1989–Aug	1995–96	Second-row	29	2	0	0	8				
1383	Keegan Hirst	2017	2019	Prop	66	1	0	0	4				
634	Kenneth "Ken" Hirst	1956–Dec	1968–69	Wing	142	100	0	0	300		CF CC		
582	Leslie Hirst	1949–Nov	1954–55	Fullback	87	7	239	0 ^²	499				
1055	David Hobbs	1994–Feb	1993–94	Prop	10	0	1	1	3	(c)			
379	Jimmy Hobson	1932–Sep	1937–Jan	Prop	175	1	0	0	3				Right-Prop, i.e. number 10, against Australia in 1933
1138	Andrew "Andy" Hodgson	1999	1999	Fullback, Wing	18	2	0	0	8				
234	William Holberry	1919–Apr	1919–Apr	Utility	1	0	0	0	0				
180	Hal Holbrook	1909–Nov	1911–Dec	Centre	3	1	0	0	3				
554	L. Holden	1946–Oct	1946	Wing	1	0	0	0	0				
964	Roy Holdstock	1986–Jan	1985–86	Prop	9	0	0	0	0				
1098	Martyn Holland	1996	2003	Fullback	119	23	0	0	76				
161	William Holland	1906–Sep	1906–07	Wing	4	0	0	0	0				
874	Barry Holliday	1980–Mar	1981–82	Scrum-half	8	3	2	1	14				
600	Keith Holliday	1952–Aug	1965–66	Scrum-half	438	94	0	0	282	(c)	CCx3, YCx3, YLx4	Great Britain, Yorkshire	
136	Dave Holmes	1903–Dec	1910–11	Fullback	53	5	41	0 ^²	97				
757	Ernest Holmes	1969–Aug	1975–76	Wing	50	6	0	0	18				
392	George Holt	1933–Apr	1933–34	Centre	11	1	0	0	3				Left-Centre, i.e. number 4, against Australia in 1933
97	Herbert Holt	1901–Oct	1901–02	Centre	2	0	0	0	0				Is this the same Herbert Holt? who played for Wigan from 1899 to 1901?
1205	Dallas Hood	2003	2004	Prop	32	2	0	0	8				
??	Liam Hood	2022	2025	Hooker	98	25	0	0	100			Scotland	
888	Ian Hopkinson	1981–Oct	1987–88	Prop	153	19	0	0	73				
699	Terence Hopwood	1964–Nov	1965–66	Scrum-half	23	9	0	0	27				
147	George Horbury	1905–Feb	1905–06	Forward	19	0	0	0	0				
160	Nathan Horbury	1906–Apr	1905–06	Forward	1	0	0	0	0				
565	Dennis Horner	1948–Apr	1953–54	Hooker	64	2	0	0	6				Derek Horner?
1094	Ryan Horsley	1996	1998	Wing, Stand-off	31	6	0	0	24				
307	William "Bill" Horton	1924–Aug	1937–38	Second-row	441	71	2	0 ^²	217	(c)		Great Britain, England, Yorkshire	
611	Aubrey Houlden	1953–Aug	1958–59	Stand-off	57	30	14	0 ^²	118				
1211	Sylvain Houles	2003	2003	Centre	4	1	0	0	4				
72	Joseph Houlton	1898–Feb	1897–98	Wing	1	0	0	0	0				
215	Bruce Howarth	1913–Nov	1919–Feb	Halfback	27	3	0	0	9				
1291	Stuart Howarth	2011	2016	Loose forward	40	6	0	0	24				Two stints, namely, 2011-12 & 2015-16
261	William Howcroft	1920–Nov	1929–30	Wing	15	4	0	0	12				
78	Henry Howe	1898–Dec	1903–04	Forward	20	0	0	0	0				
678	Ronnie Howe	1962–Apr	1962–63	Prop	3	0	0	0	0				
320	Ralph Howell	1925–Oct	19??	Prop	49	7	0	0	21				
3	Tommy Howell	1895–Sep	1900–Oct	Centre	163	14	15	0 ^²	91				
758	Graham Howells	1969–Aug	1969–70	Centre	3	2	0	0	6				
550	Derek Howes	1945–Nov	1953–54	Second-row, Loose forward	179	45	1	0 ^²	137		CC	British Empire XIII	
1124	Danny Howley	1997–Aug	1997	Wing	3	1	0	0	4				
1379	Craig Huby	2017	2019	Prop	51	3	0	0	12				
42	George Hudson	1896–Feb	1895–96	Forward	1	1	0	0	3				
901	Roger Hudson	1982–Feb	1981–82	Fullback	3	0	0	0	0				
1158	Ryan Hudson	2000	2001	Hooker	56	12	0	1	49				
807	Terry Hudson	1975–Jan	1977–78	Scrum-half	80	4	0	0	12				
362	Bill Hudson	1930–Aug	1931–Oct	Prop	48	0	0	0	0				
586	Bill Hudson	1950–Aug	1951–52	Loose forward	50	12	0	0	36	(c)		Yorkshire	
453	James Hufton	1940–Mar	1940–Mar	Stand-off	1	0	0	0	0				
1129	Adam Hughes	1998	2000	Centre	78	43	49	0	270				
559	George Hughes	1947–Jan	1948–49	Second-row	47	9	0	0	27				
917	Ian Hughes	1983–Mar	1988–89	Prop, Second-row	58	8	0	0	32				
1110	Ian Hughes	1997–Jan	1998	Second-row	44	6	0	0	24				
846	John Hughes	1977–Dec	1978–79	Centre	23	2	0	0	6				
881	Mick Hughes	1981–Apr	1980–81	Prop	7	0	0	0	0				
581	Reginald Hughes	1949–Sep	1953–54	Loose forward	111	37	64	0 ^²	239				
779	Sam Hughes	1972–Apr	1971–72	Hooker	2	0	0	0	0				
411	William Hughes	1934–Nov	1937–38	Wing	29	5	0	0	15				
1009	Alan Hunte	1989–Jan	1988–89	Wing	2	1	0	0	4				
720	Michael Hunte	1966–Aug	1972–73	Wing	16	3	0	0	9				
471	B. Hutchinson	1940–Sep	1941–Dec	Centre	12	2	0	0	6				
509	Tom Hutchinson	1942–Oct	1943–44	Wing	12	2	0	0	6				
1282	Kieran Hyde	2010	2011	Scrum-half	13	4	4	0	24				
812	Graham Idle	1975–Aug	1979–80	Second-row, Loose forward	169	12	0	0	36				
787	Eric Ingham	1973–Jan	1976–77	Hooker	55	3	0	0	9				
116	H. Inman	1902–Oct	1902–03	Wing	2	0	0	0	0				
570	Bill Ivill	1948–Sep	1949–50	Centre	10	2	0	0	6				
1012	Brian Jackson	1989–Oct	1989–90	Centre	17	3	0	0	12				
39	G. Jackson	1896–Jan	1895–96	Forward	1	0	0	0	0				
1027	Michael Jackson	1991–Sep	1992–93	Second-row	33	10	0	0	40			Great Britain	
1147	Paul Jackson	1999	2002	Prop	106	2	0	0	8				
117	Wilfred Jackson	1902–Nov	1906–07	Wing	6	0	0	0	0				
106	Bob Jacques	1902–Sep	1904–05	Centre	82	12	23	0 ^²	82				
1319	Matt James	2012	2012	Prop	5	0	0	0	0				
25	W. H. James	1895–Oct	1897–98	Centre	20	1	0	0	3				
622	Ray Jaques	1955–Apr	1957–58	Second-row	41	10	0	0	30				
990	Dick Jasiewicz	1987–Mar	1987–88	Second-row	16	5	0	0	20				
734	David Jeanes	1967–Sep	1972–73	Prop	168	34	0	0	102	(c)	CF	Great Britain, Yorkshire	
1201	Ben Jeffries	2003 ^¹	2010	Halfback	170	77	27	6	368				
527	Dai Jenkins	1944–Feb	1944	Scrum-half	2	0	0	0	0				World War II guest? David Jenkins?
450	Reg Jenkinson	1939–Apr	1950–51	Wing	165	65	0	0	195				
274	J. T. Jennings	1921–Sep	1921–22	Centre	2	0	0	0	0				
488	G. Jepson	1941–Oct	1944–Feb	Halfback	27	5	14	0 ^²	43				
1070	John Jepson	1994–95	1994–95		3	0	0	0	0				
1307	Isaac John	2012	2013	Stand-off	14	2	19	0	46				
196	Benjamin Johnson	1912–Sep	1915–Apr	Forward	74	16	1	0 ^²	50				
402	George Johnson	1934–Mar	1934–35	Fullback	15	0	1	0 ^²	2				
1294	Greg Johnson	2011	2011	Wing	13	2	0	0	8				
1276	Paul Johnson	2010	2010	Second-row	16	4	0	0	16				
1286	Paul Johnson	2011	2012	Prop	47	6	0	0	24				
81	R. Johnson	1899–Nov	1899–1900	Halfback	23	1	2	0 ^²	7				
909	Tony Johnson	1982–Sep	1982–83	Second-row	3	0	0	0	0				On loan from Huddersfield, also played on-loan at Bradford Northern, Chairman of the Huddersfield Players Association
1354	Tom Johnstone	2015	present	Wing	144	103	0	0	412				Two stints, namely, 2015-22 & 2015-present
1366	Ben Jones-Bishop	2016	2020	Wing, Fullback	116	64	0	0	256				
225	Arthur Jones	1919–Jan	1919–Apr	Scrum-half	5	0	0	0	0				
690	Berwyn Jones	1964–Mar	1966–67	Wing	89	47	0	0	141			Great Britain	
892	David Jones	1981–Nov	1985–86	Wing	108	27	0	0	100				To Featherstone Rovers
1024	David Jones	1990–Nov	1992–93	Wing	88	13	0	0	52				From Wigan
484	Harry Jones	1941–Mar	1941–May	Second-row	9	1	0	0	3				
562	Harry Jones	1947–Oct	1950–51	Centre	43	12	0	0	46				
128	Herbert Jones	1903–Mar	1902–03	Utility	4	0	0	0	0				
438	Johnny Jones	1937–Nov	1947–48	Stand-off	125	30	2	0 ^²	94		CC	Yorkshire	
329	Joseph "Joe" Jones	1927–Jan	19??	Centre	124	19	0	0	57				
968	Ken Jones	1986–Mar	1985–86	Stand-off	5	0	13	0	26				
481	Les Jones	1941–Mar	1941–May	Centre	8	3	0	0	9				World War II guest? Les 'Cowboy' Jones (Warrington)?
1212	Darren Jordan	2003	2004	Hooker	1	0	0	0	0				
955	Ian Jowitt	1985–Sep	1990–91	Wing	41	8	0	0	32				12 May 1965 (age 61) Normanton Freeston High School was Office Clerk 5 ft 9 in (1.75 m) 12 st 7 lb (79 kg)Left wing Normanton ARLFC→Wakefield Trinity; Father of Max Jowitt
1346	Max Jowitt	2014	present	Fullback	175	75	315	0	930				Son of Ian Jowitt
1159	Warren Jowitt	2000	2000	Prop	24	8	0	0	32				
292	Walter Jubb	1923–Mar	1928–29	Stand-off	25	4	0	0	12				From (near) Wakefield
1103	Chris Judge	1996	1998		45	6	0	0	24				
243	Ernest Jukes	1919–Nov	1919–20	Scrum-half	3	0	0	0	0				
472	Tommy Jukes	1940–Sep	1941–Feb	Loose forward	2	0	0	0	0				
855	Brian Juliff	1978–Sep	1981–82	Wing	119	49	0	0	147			Wales	
1357	Ben Kavanagh	2015	2015	Prop	15	0	0	0	0			Scotland	On loan from Widnes Vikings
1316	Liam Kay	2012	2024	Wing	95	26	0	0	104				Three stints, namely, 2012-13, 2020 (loan) & 2021-24
1185	Damon Keating	2002	2002	Prop	26	1	0	0	4				Australian
1331	James Keinhorst	2014	2014	Centre	7	1	0	0	4				On loan from Leeds Rhinos
769	Stuart Kelley	1970–Oct	1970–71	Hooker	10	0	0	0	0				
868	Andy Kelly	1979–Sep ^¹	1992–93	Second-row	155	30	0	0	105	(c)			
303	Joseph Kelly	1924–Apr	1924–25	Loose forward	13	2	0	0	6				From (near) Wakefield
982	Neil Kelly	1987–Jan	1987–88	Loose forward	18	2	1	0	8				
925	Richard Kelly	1983–Nov	1984–85	Fullback, Stand-off	11	1	0	0	4				
604	Robert Kelly	1952–Oct	1958–59	Second-row	196	21	0	0	63	(c)		Great Britain, Other Nationalities	
1093	Jamie Kelso	1996	1996		10	0	0	0	0				
1145	Tony Kemp	1999	2000	Stand-off	22	2	0	0	8	(c)			
315	Joseph Kendall	1925–Mar	19??	Second-row	54	8	0	0	24				
1142	Shane Kenward	1999	1999	Stand-off	30	7	0	0	28				
1113	Roger Kenworthy	1997–Feb	1998	Scrum-half	49	22	0	0	88				
1	Harry Kershaw	1895–Sep	1900–Mar	Fullback, Halfback	54	11	3	0 ^²	39				
154	Herbert Kershaw	1906–Jan	1921–22	Halfback, Forward	288	46	17	0 ^²	172	(c)	CC	Great Britain, England, Yorkshire	
??	Lee Kershaw	2018	2023	Wing	50	18	0	0	72				
602	Michael Kielty	1952–Sep	1955–56	Scrum-half	13	1	0	0	3				
538	Norman C. Kielty	1944–45	1947–48	Hooker	29	3	0	0	9				older brother of Stan Kielty
537	Stan Kielty	1944–45	1946–47	Scrum-half	11	1	0	0	3			(England, Yorkshire at Halifax)	Younger brother of Norman C. Kielty
181	George Killingbeck	1909–Dec	1909–Dec	Forward	3	0	0	0	0				
??	George King	2019	2020	Prop, Loose forward	29	0	0	0	0			Ireland	
1223	Kevin King	2005	2005	Centre	9	2	0	0	8				
1277	Paul King	2010	2011	Prop	32	0	0	1	1				
67	John Kingswell	1897–Dec	1897–98	Wing	1	0	0	0	0				
66	William Kingswell	1897–Dec	1898–99	Wing	11	2	0	0	6				
223	John Kirby	1919–Jan	1919–Jan	Wing	1	0	0	0	0				
1226	Andy Kirk	2005	2005	Wing, Centre	9	1	0	0	4				
642	Malcolm Kirk	1957–Dec	1957–58	Prop	3	0	0	0	0				Later became a pro-wrestler
831	Bill Kirkbride	1976–Nov	1979–80	Second-row	37	4	0	0	12				Head coach 1979-80
1356	Ian Kirke	2015	2015	Second-row, Prop	5	3	0	0	12				
1280	Danny Kirmond	2010 ^¹	2020	Second-row	174	46	0	0	184	(c)			
977	Russell Klein	1986–Oct	1986–87	Wing	21	5	0	0	20				
1056	Adam Knighton	1994–Feb	1995–96	Wing	15	5	0	0	20				
1184	Ian Knott	2002	2002	Second-row	21	4	63	0	142				
410	Cyril Knowles	1934–Nov	1937–38	Fullback	65	0	95	0 ^²	190				
782	David Knowles	1972–Oct	1974–75	Second-row	81	16	0	0	48				
156	Peter Knowling	1906–Feb	1906–07	Forward	10	0	0	0	0				
??	Craig Kopczak	2019	2020	Prop, Second-row	43	3	0	0	12				
1203	Michael Korkidas	2003 ^¹	2009	Prop	168	16	0	0	64				
673	Milan Kosanović	1961–Aug	1963–64	Hooker	70	6	0	0	18		CC	English League XIII & Yorkshire	Yugoslavian
1075	Mike Kuiti	1995–96	1996	Second-row	30	3	0	0	12	(c)			
541	George Lamb	1944–45	1944–45	Second-row	1	0	0	0	0				
617	David Lamming	1954–Apr	1961–62	Loose forward	113	23	0	0	69				Later was head coach in 1984-85
836	Mike Lampkowski	1977–Feb	1984–85	Scrum-half, Loose forward	162	46	0	0	139				
150	George Land	1905–Nov	1907–08	Wing	20	10	1	0 ^²	32				
??	Samisoni Langi	2023	2023	Centre, Stand-off, Loose forward	14	2	0	0	8			France	
257	George Land	1920–Sep	19??	Centre	88	2	0	0	6				
187	Leonard Land	1911–Apr	1920–Apr	Fullback	128	0	7	0 ^²	14				
799	Barry Langton	1974–Mar	1974–75	Scrum-half	14	5	0	0	15				
795	Terry Langton	1973–Dec	1977–78	Scrum-half	37	3	0	0	9				
820	Lou Lardi	1976–Mar	1976–77	Prop	9	0	0	0	0				
1120	Dale Laughton	1997–Jun	1997	Prop	4	0	0	0	0			Scotland	
1311	Ali Lauiti'iti	2012	2015	Second-row	86	17	0	0	68				
1121	Graham Law	1997–Jun	2002	Wing, Centre	83	7	42	0	112				
1100	Martin Law	1996	1998		66	9	0	0	36				
1137	Neil Law	1999	2002	Wing	91	44	1	0	178				
??	Myles Lawford		present	Scrum-half, Stand-off									
780	Ray Layton	1972–Sep	1974–75	Centre	45	13	0	0	39				
962	Tracy Lazenby	1985–Nov	1992–93	Stand-off, Loose forward	139	21	38	14	170	(c)			
1281	Charlie Leaeno	2010	2010	Prop	10	2	0	0	8				
514	Jack Ledger	1942–Dec	1942–Dec	Fullback	1	0	0	0	0				
435	Sam Lee	1937–Oct	1938–39	Hooker	78	0	188	0 ^²	376				
1287	Tommy Lee	2011	2011	Halfback	27	7	0	0	28				
1082	Andrew Leeds	1995–96	1995–96	Fullback	8	4	16	0	48				
996	Gregg Lennon	1987–Sep	1987–88	Wing	8	5	0	0	20				
1239	Tevita Leo-Latu	2006	2010	Hooker	81	14	0	0	56			Tonga	
1007	James Leuluai	1988–Oct	1989–90	Centre	51	12	0	0	48				
927	Scott Lewis	1983–Dec	1983–84	Centre	6	6	0	0	24				
928	Wally Lewis	1983–Dec	1983–84	Stand-off	10	6	0	0	24				Australian
732	Michael Lig	1967–Sep	1970–71	Hooker	5	1	0	0	3				
1244	Danny Lima	2007	2007	Prop	4	0	0	0	0				
595	John Lindley	1951–Aug	1959–60	Centre, Prop	87	5	0	0	15				to St Helens. Not to be confused with Wakefield Trinity historian John Lindley
??	Tom Lineham	2022	2023	Centre, Wing, Second-row	20	3	0	0	12				
??	Ellis Lingard	2025	present	Prop, Second-row, Loose forward	1	2	0	0	8				
374	Frank Lingard	1932–Apr ^¹	1933–Dec	Centre	23	1	0	0	3				
??	Mason Lino	2021	present	Stand-off, Scrum-half	122	19	191	4	462				Samoan
1112	Paul Lister	1997–Jan	1997	Forward	2	0	0	0	0				
73	John Henry Littlewood	1898–Feb	1897–98	Forward	8	0	0	0	0				
1358	Kevin Locke	2015	2015	Fullback, Wing	5	2	0	0	8				New Zealander
458	Bertram Lockwood	1940–Mar	1940–Apr	Fullback	2	0	0	0	0				
830	Brian Lockwood	1976–Nov	1977–78	Prop	25	5	0	0	15				
98	Claude Lockwood	1901–Oct	1902–03	Forward	14	1	0	0	3				
613	Eric Lockwood	1953–Nov	1959–60	Fullback	123	22	0	0	66				
626	Gerald Lockwood	1956–Jan	1956–57	Fullback	15	0	39	0 ^²	42				
1117	Jon-Lee Lockwood	1997–May	1997	Second-row	12	1	0	0	4				
33	Richard Lockwood	1895–Oct	1900–01	Centre	129	31	60	0 ^²	222			Yorkshire	
381	Stan Lockwood	1932–Oct	1933–Jan	Centre	2	0	0	0	0				
??	Tray Lolesio	2026	present	Prop		0	0	0	0				
345	Harry Lomas	1928–Sep	1930–Mar	Utility Forward	4	0	0	0	0				
466	Albany Longley	1940–May ^¹	1948–Oct	Wing	23	5	0	0	15				World War II guest?
1049	Simon Longstaff	1993–Sep	1993–94	Loose forward	5	0	0	0	0				
1128	Gary Lord	1998	1998	Prop, Second-row	33	0	0	0	0				
1031	Paul Lord	1991–Nov	1992–93	Wing	10	4	0	0	14				
652	Jan Lotriet	1958–Dec	1958–59	Wing	3	2	0	0	6				South Africa Made his Wakefield Trinity début, and scored a try in the 19–7 victory over Castleford at Wheldon Road on Thursday 25 December 1958
566	Ernest Luckman	1948–Apr	1954–55	Fullback	166	16	4	0 ^²	56				
789	Barry Lumb	1973–Mar	1975–76	Wing	48	8	54	0 ^²	132				
630	Michael Lumb	1956–Apr	1957–58	Prop	10	1	0	0	3				
1089	Martin Luxford	1995–96	1997	??	4	0	0	0	0				
171	William "Billy" Lynch	1907–Sep	1919–20	Centre	258	71	2	0	217		CC	England, Yorkshire	
1322	Reece Lyne	2013	2023	Centre	233	64	0	0	256				
885	John Lyons	1981–Aug	1986–87	Stand-off	127	51	77	14	354				
773	Steve Lyons	1971–Sep ^¹	1981–82	Prop	78	10	0	0	30			Yorkshire	
1229	Scott MacDonald	2006	2008	Fullback	3	0	0	0	0			Scotland	
1222	Duncan MacGillivray	2004	2008	Second-row	98	6	0	0	24			Scotland	
653	Norman Mackie	1959–Mar	1958–59	Hooker	1	0	0	0	0				
363	Harry Maddox	1930–Oct	1932–Nov	Stand-off	19	2	0	0	6				
324	Dai Maidment	1926–Aug		Second-row	86	20	0	0	60			Wales	
774	Mick Major	1971–Sep	1972–73	Wing	47	22	0	0	66				
58	Billie Malkin	1897–Sep	1906–07	Wing, Centre	196	16	0	0	48				
991	Paul Mallinder	1987–Mar	1989–90	Prop	62	5	0	0	20				23 March 1962 (age 64) St. Winifred's High School Yorkshire (RU) Under-19s was Turner at Avon Transmission Services, Wakefield 6' 1" 14-1/2 stone Prop, Second-row Normanton ARLFC?Bradford Northern?Wakefield Trinity
731	Matthew Malloy	1967–Sep	1967–68	Second-row	1	0	0	0	0				
1157	Francis Maloney	2000	2000	Stand-off	13	2	1	0	10				
422	Johnny Malpass	1936–Aug	1946–47	Centre	146	37	1	0 ^²	113			Yorkshire	
676	Gerry Mann	1962–Mar	1964–65	Wing, Centre	42	23	0	0	69				
491	Dick Manning	1941–Dec	1942–Oct	Loose forward	15	0	2	0 ^²	4				World War II guest?
1123	David March	1997–Aug	2007	Hooker	232	43	157	2	478				
1114	Paul March	1997–Feb ^¹	2007	Scrum-half	109	27	39	2	188				
50	Miles Marfell	1896–Oct	1896–97	Forward	6	0	0	0	0				
1290	Frankie Mariano	2011	2013	Second-row	56	21	0	0	84				
1047	Ian Marlow	1993–Sep	1996	Prop	77	3	0	0	12			Wales	
104	James "Jim" Marsh	1902–Jan	1905–06	Forward	22	0	0	0	0				
94	Joe Marsh	1901–Apr	1901–02	Halfback	9	2	0	0	6				
451	Len Marson	1939–Oct	1952–53	Hooker	305	32	1	0 ^²	98		CC	England, Yorkshire	
756	Jack Marston	1969–Aug	1972–73	Centre	105	36	0	0	108				
1255	Tony Martin	2008	2009	Centre	37	12	33	0	114				
1111	Mick Martindale	1997–Jan	1997	Loose forward	5	1	0	1	5				
1161	Martin Masella	2000	2000	Prop	24	4	0	0	16				
900	Colin Maskill	1982–Feb	1984–85	Hooker	67	13	165	4	377				
1328	Dan Maskill	2013	??	Hooker	1	0	0	0	0				
373	Raymond Maskill	1932–Feb	1934–Sep	Prop	31	0	0	0	0				
993	Andrew Mason	1987–Aug	1993–94	Centre	216	111	0	0	444	(c)		Yorkshire	
1166	Keith Mason	2000	2001	Prop	23	0	0	0	0			Wales	
??	Nathan Mason	2023	2023	Prop	1	0	0	0	0				On loan from Huddersfield Giants
1300	Samy Masselot	2011	2011	Second-row	1	0	0	0	0				
1303	Richard Mathers	2012	2014	Fullback	73	24	0	0	96				
1374	Judah Mazive	2016	2017	Wing	2	1	0	0	4				Zimbabwean
304	Thomas McAllister	1924–Apr	1923–24	Stand-off	1	0	0	0	0				
1295	Tyrone McCarthy	2011	2011	Second-row	7	1	0	0	4				
856	Alan McCurrie	1978–Sep	1981–82	Hooker	115	28	0	8	92				
838	Paul McDermott	1977–Mar ^¹	1983–84	Loose forward	85	25	0	1	77				
733	Eddie McDonagh	1967–Sep	1970–71	Wing	30	13	0	0	39				
1053	Wayne McDonald	1993–Dec	1999	Prop, Second-row	106	32	0	0	128				
140	John McDonnell	1904–Sep	1908–09	Forward	98	17	1	0 ^²	53				
??	Kian McGann		present	Centre, Wing, Fullback			0	0					
452	James McGee	1939–Dec	1940–Dec	Centre	5	2	0	0	6				
226	Jim McGee	1919–Jan	1927–Jan	Second-row, Loose forward	57	0	10	0 ^²	20				
??	Jermaine McGillvary	2024	2024	Wing	17	16	1	0	66				
1069	Steve McGowan	1994–95	1996	Centre	21	3	0	0	12				
276	James McGuire	1921–Sep	1921–22	Centre	2	1	0	0	3				
1108	Richard McKell	1997–Jan	1997	Prop	4	0	0	0	0				
666	Des McKeown	1960–Oct	1960–61	Second-row	7	0	0	0	0				
1107	James McLaren	1997–Jan	1997	Wing	20	8	7	0	46			Scotland	
742	Matthew McLeod	1968–Jan	1969–70	Prop	76	5	0	0	15		CF		
518	A. McManus	1943–Jan	1943–Jan	Loose forward	2	0	0	0	0				World War II guest? Alfred McManus?
517	Patrick McManus	1943–Jan	1943–Jan	Prop	1	0	0	0	0				World War II guest?
??	Mike McMeeken	2025	present	Prop, Second-row	27	6	0	0	24			England	
201	Edward McNally	1913–Jan	1913–Jan	Forward	4	0	0	0	0				
1160	Steve McNamara	2000	2000	Loose forward	19	2	40	0	88	(c)			
138	Bob McPhail	1904–Apr	1908–09	Centre	110	19	1	0 ^²	59			Yorkshire	
1334	Paul McShane	2014	2015	Hooker	51	6	0	0	24				
444	Jim McTiffin	1938–Sep	1939–40	Prop	31	3	0	0	9				
142	Harry Measor	1904–Sep	1906–07	Fullback	26	0	19	0 ^²	38				
1305	Vince Mellars	2012	2013	Centre	29	4	0	0	16				
583	Glyn Meredith	1950–Mar	1952–53	Stand-off	80	19	63	0 ^²	183				
637	Donald Metcalfe	1957–Apr	1968–69	Fullback	212	33	0	0	99			Yorkshire	
62	James Metcalfe	1897–Sep	1910–11	Fullback	374	3	386	0 ^²	781	(c)	CC	Yorkshire	
347	James Metcalfe	1928–Nov	1930–Dec	Stand-off	21	0	0	0	0				
287	Harold Micklethwaite	1922–Oct	1924–25	Second-row	40	2	4	0 ^²	14				From (near) Wakefield
817	Trevor Midgley	1975–Nov	1979–80	Fullback	120	11	0	0	33				
806	Doug Miles	1974–Oct	1974–75	Wing	3	0	0	0	0				
1272	Daryl Millard	2010	2011	Centre	23	11	0	0	44				
340	F. Millard	1928–Feb	1928–Feb	Second-row	1	0	0	0	0				
1348	Jacob Miller	2015	2022	Scrum-half, Stand-off	200	62	17	10	292	(c)			Australian
231	Thomas Miller	1919–Apr	1920–Mar	Wing	26	7	0	0	21				
212	William Millican	1913–Sep	1915–Apr	Utility Back	17	2	8	0 ^²	22				or William Milligan
957	John Millington	1985–Sep	1985–86	Prop	15	0	0	0	0				
202	John Mills	1913–Jan	1914–Apr	Wing	30	6	0	0	18				
636	David Milner	1957–Apr	1957–Apr	Fullback	2	0	0	0	0				
396	J. C. Milner	1933–Nov ^¹	1941–42	Wing	60	14	68	0 ^²	178				5 ft 9 in (1.75 m), 11 st 10 lb (74 kg), born (near) Castleford
239	James Milner	1919–Sep	1919–20	Wing	10	3	0	0	9				
706	Laurie Milner	1965–Aug	1965–66	Hooker	3	1	0	0	3				
??	Rowan Milnes	2023	2023	Stand-off, Scrum-half	1	0	0	0	0				On loan from Hull KR
6	Edward Milsom	1895–Sep	1898–Dec	Halfback	42	0	0	0	0				
87	George Milsom	1900–Oct	1903–04	Halfback	73	8	0	0	24				
??	Thomas Minns	2022	2022	Centre, Wing	2	1	0	0	4				
86	Willie Mitchell	1900–Sep	1904–05	Forward	118	2	0	0	6				
1191	Martin Moana	2002	2002	Loose forward	21	10	0	0	40				
992	David Moll	1987–Apr	1986–87	Wing	3	3	0	0	12				
1326	Jon Molloy	2013	??	Second-row									
232	Donald H. Moore	1919–Apr	1923–Jan	Centre, Scrum-half	28	5	0	0	15				From (near) Wakefield
540	Frank Moore	1944–45 ^¹	1960–61	Prop	76	5	0	0	15				
1297	Gareth Moore	2011	2011	Scrum-half	5	1	14	1	33				
902	Gary Moore	1982–Mar	1983–84	Centre	18	3	0	0	12				
1241	Richard Moore	2007 ^¹	2014	Prop	118	11	0	0	36				
394	Ronald Moore	1933–Oct	1935–36	Centre	62	14	1	0 ^²	44				
1364	Scott Moore	2015	2016	Hooker, Scrum-half, Stand-off	18	1	0	0	4				
23	A. E. Moorhouse	1895–Sep	1896–97	Forward	65	1	9	0 ^²	23				
631	Stan Moorhouse	1956–Apr	1955–56	Wing	1	0	0	0	0				
285	Joseph Moran	1922–Sep	1922–23	Prop	25	1	0	0	3				
866	Colin Morgan	1979–Apr	1978–79	Wing	2	0	0	0	0				
467	G. Morgan	1940–May	1940–May	Stand-off	1	1	0	0	3				Gil Morgan?
18	Harry Morgan	1895–Sep	1896–Mar	Halfback	30	2	0	0	6				
730	Mick Morgan	1967–Apr	1976–77	Hooker, Loose forward	270	76	0	0	228	(c)		England, Yorkshire	
51	Herbert Morrell	1896–Oct	1896–97	Forward	1	0	0	0	0				
873	Wayne Morrell	1980–Feb	1982–83	Centre	28	4	0	0	12				
1375	Frazer Morris	2016	2017	Prop	1	0	0	0	0				
1017	Lynton Morris	1990–Aug	1993–94	Second-row	17	0	0	0	0				
448	Wilfred Morris	1939–Jan	1939–Oct	Centre	6	1	0	0	0				
1274	Glenn Morrison	2010	2011	Second-row	46	10	0	0	40	(c)			
621	Albert Mortimer	1955–Feb	1957–58	Centre	39	15	0	0	45				
1021	Chris Mortimer	1990–Sep	1990–91	Stand-off	24	2	0	0	8				
648	David Mortimer	1958–Sep	1959–60	Stand-off	13	2	2	0 ^²	10				
596	Frank Mortimer	1951–Oct	1958–59	Fullback	174	33	378	0 ^²	855			Great Britain, Yorkshire	
250	John Mortimer	1920–Apr	1919–20	Loose forward	1	0	0	0	0				
1271	Dale Morton	2009	2011	Wing	27	9	5	0	46				
108	Herbert Morton	1902–Sep	1902–03	Forward	13	1	0	0	3				
167	Joseph Morton	1906–Nov	1907–08	Wing	11	1	0	0	3				
1037	James Mosley	1992–Nov	1996	Wing	35	7	0	0	28				
338	William Moss	1928–Feb		Second-row	97	1	0	0	3				
1373	Brad Moules												
22	T. Mountain	1895–Sep	1895–96	Forward	15	0	0	0	0				
480	Harold Moxon	1941–Feb	1941–Feb	Stand-off	1	0	0	0	0				World War II guest?
84	Herbert Moxon	1900–Sep	1902–03	Halfback	21	3	0	0	9				
1362	Anthony Mullally	2015	2015	Prop	9	2	0	0	8			Ireland	On loan from Huddersfield Giants
1076	Keith Mumby	1995–96	1995–96	Fullback	3	0	0	0	0				
1249	Aaron Murphy	2007	2011	Wing	64	16	0	0	64				
497	Con Murphy	1942–Jan	1944–Mar	Hooker	4	0	0	0	0			(Wales at Leeds)	World War II guest?
496	E. J. Murphy	1942–Jan	1942–Nov	Centre	9	5	4	0 ^²	23				
459	Harry Murphy	1940–Apr	1952–Oct	Second-row	290	50	62	0 ^²	274			Great Britain, England, Yorkshire	
??	Lewis Murphy	2022	2023	Wing	24	19	0	0	76				
697	Peter Murphy	1964–Sep	1964–65	Prop	2	0	0	0	0				
832	Nigel Murray	1976–Dec	1980–81	Prop	45	7	5	0	79				
930	Peter Muscroft	1984–Jan	1983–84	Wing	1	0	0	0	0				
382	Albert Musgrove	1932–Oct	1932–Oct	Prop	1	0	0	0	0				
1126	David Mycoe	1998	1998	Stand-off, Hooker	21	4	3	0	22				
1032	David Myers	1991–Nov	1993–94	Wing	6	2	0	0	8				
??	Jayden Myers		present	Wing, Fullback			0	0					
1091	Adam Nable	1996	1996	Hooker	17	3	0	0	12				
1118	Joe Naidole	1997–May	1997	Prop	14	1	0	0	4				
??	Romain Navarrete	2020	2020	Prop	11	0	0	0	0				On loan from Wigan Warriors
47	Alfred Naylor	1896–Sep	1896–97	Forward	4	0	0	0	0				
267	George Naylor	1921–Jan	1925–26	Loose forward	23	2	0	0	6				
314	R. B. Naylor	1925–Jan		Second-row, Loose forward	20	5	6	0 ^²	27				
564	Stan Naylor	1947–Dec	1949–50	Centre	20	5	6	0 ^²	27				
861	David Needham	1979–Apr	1981–82	Wing, Centre	12	2	0	0	6				
1067	David Nelson	1994–95	1994–95	Wing	18	4	0	0	16				
474	Wilf Ness	1940–Oct	1940–Oct	Stand-off	1	0	0	0	0				
118	Thomas Newbould	1902–Nov	1919–20	Halfback	365	57	150	0 ^²	436	(c)	CC	Great Britain, England, Yorkshire	
388	Harry Newby	1932–Dec	1933–Jan	Fullback	6	0	0	0	0				
1204	Richard Newlove	2003	2003	Centre	23	8	0	0	32				
1275	Terry Newton	2010	2010	Hooker	2	0	0	0	0				
513	Harry Nicholls	1942–Oct	194?	Second-row	7	2	0	0	6				
890	Bryce Nicholson	1981–Oct ^¹	1984–85	Centre	8	0	0	0	0				
368	George Nicholson	1931–Aug	1938–Apr	Hooker	35	2	0	0	6				
431	Harry Nicholson	1937–Mar	1940–41	Prop	45	3	0	0	9				
784	Steve Nicholson	1972–Oct	1972–73	Prop	1	0	0	0	0				
??	Seth Nikotemo	2025	present	Second-row	17	4	0	0	16				
1062	Brian Noble	1994–95	1994–95	Hooker	9	0	0	0	0				
822	David Noble	1976–Apr	1976–77	Centre	3	0	7	1	15				
512	George North	1942–Oct	194?	Scrum-half	7	2	0	0	6				
919	Michael Norton	1983–Apr	1984–85	Scrum-half	11	4	2	1	20				
1008	Steve Norton	1988–Nov	1988–89	Loose forward	10	3	0	0	12				
667	Albert Nunn	1960–Dec	1962–63	Centre	3	0	0	0	0				
579	Dennis Nutting	1949–Aug	1950–51	Prop	28	0	0	0	0				
1202	Clinton O'Brien	2003	2003	Prop	4	0	0	0	0				
821	Paul O'Brien	1976–Mar	1976–77	Centre	12	6	0	0	18				
1172	Julian O'Neill	2001	2001	Prop	28	2	0	0	8				New Zealander
1224	Julian O'Neill	2005	2005	Fullback	13	2	4	0	16				Australian
644	Geoff Oakes	1958–Feb	1967–68	Hooker	193	8	0	0	24		CCx2		
265	Horace Oakes	1921–Jan	1921–22	Wing	17	4	0	0	12				
1225	Sam Obst	2005	2011	Scrum-half	137	44	6	0	190				
574	Bob Ogden	1949–Jan	1950–51	Scrum-half	23	6	0	0	18				
921	George Oglethorpe	1983–Oct	1983–84		4	0	0	0	0				
423	Bob Oliver	1936–Sep ^¹	1945–46	Fullback	36	1	10	0 ^²	23				Fourth-youngest player to make his début for Wakefield Trinity aged 16-years and 6 months in 1936, to Bramley
??	Derrell Olpherts	2024	2024	Centre, Fullback, Wing	28	27	0	0	108				
371	F. Orbell	1931–Sep	1933–Nov	Second-row, Loose forward	18	0	0	0	0				
449	Sandy Orford	1939–Jan	1946–47	Second-row	177	17	0	0	51			Wales	
765	Bob Oswald	1970–Aug	1972–73	Second-row	23	3	1	0 ^²	11				
803	Henry Oulton	1974–Sep	1976–77	Fullback	40	6	111	2 ^²	252				Brother of Willie Oulton
810	Willie Oulton	1975–Mar	1976–77	Fullback	20	0	14	0 ^²	28				Brother of Henry Oulton
358	Harold Owen	1930–Mar	1933–Dec	Fullback, Wing	75	8	1	0 ^²	26				
694	Ray Owen	1964–Aug	1968–69	Scrum-half	82	19	2	0 ^²	61		CFx2 Harry Sunderland Trophy		
1344	Richard Owen	2014	2016	Wing	34	11	0	0	44				
1349	Lopini Paea	2015	2015	Prop, Second-row	11	0	0	0	0				Australian
640	Melvyn Page	1957–Dec	1957–58	Scrum-half	4	1	0	0	3				
721	Richard Paley	1966–Sep	1969–70	Fullback, Centre	38	6	0	0	18				
552	K. Palmer	1946–Apr		Prop, Hooker	4	0	4	0 ^²	8				
501	R. Palmer	1942–Mar	1942–Mar	Prop	1	0	0	0	0				
792	Barry Parker	1973–Aug	1973–74	Wing	14	6	0	0	18				
898	Derek Parker	1982–Jan	1982–83	Centre	29	7	1	0	22				
75	Henry Parker	1898–Sep	1903–04	Forward	156	14	0	0	42				
645	Reg Parker	1958–Feb	1957–58	Second-row	8	0	0	0	0				
969	Brian Parkes	1986–Mar	1985–86	Centre	7	1	0	0	4				
157	Sammy Parkes	1906–Apr	1910–11	Forward	81	10	0	0	30				Left-Second-row, i.e. number 11, against Australia in 1908 (did not appear in 1909 Challenge Cup final)
191	Billy Parkes	1911–Oct	1912–Dec	Forward	9	0	0	0	0				
213	Ernest Parkin	1913–Oct	1924–Mar	Forward	151	21	0	0	63			Yorkshire	
207	Jonty Parkin	1913–Apr	1930–Apr	Halfback	342	96	94	0 ^²	476	(c)		Great Britain, England & Yorkshire	
493	Walt Parkin	1942–Jan	1942–Jan	Fullback	1	0	0	0	0				
638	Ronnie Parkinson	1957–Sep	1957–58	Scrum-half	1	0	0	0	0				
981	Steve Parrish	1987–Jan	1986–87	Centre	3	0	4	0	8				
121	John Partington	1902–Dec	1902–03	Forward	3	0	0	0	0				
280	James Paterson	1921–Oct	1921–22	Scrum-half	8	0	0	0	0				The surname has one 't', i.e. Paterson, not double 'tt', i.e. Patterson. Related to William Paterson?
256	William Paterson	1920–Sep	1920–21	Fullback	9	0	0	0	0				Related to James Paterson?
1052	Henry Paul	1993–Dec	1993–94	Fullback, Stand-off	19	7	41	1	111				
??	Pauli Pauli	2018	2019	Prop, Second-row	46	10	0	0	40				
671	Eric Payne	1961–Mar	1964–65	Second-row	34	6	32	0 ^²	82				
316	Joe "Sandy" Pearce	1925–Apr	1933	Halfback	269	36	44	0 ^²	196				Left wing, i.e. number 5, against Australia in 1933
425	M. Pearman	1936–Oct	1936–37	Centre	12	2	0	0	6				
679	Roger Pearman	1962–Aug	1963–64	Loose forward	18	9	0	0	27		CC		
1171	Martin Pearson	2001	2001	Stand-off	25	4	71	3	161			Wales	
1104	Richard Pearson	1996	1996		1	0	0	0	0				
953	Richard Pell	1985–Apr	1984–85	Prop	1	0	0	0	0				
1289	Kevin Penny	2011	2011	Wing	5	1	0	0	4				
253	Clifford Pepper	1920–Aug	1923–24	Stand-off	74	15	0	0	45				
1014	Chris Perry	1989–Oct	1991–92	Fullback	68	18	2	0	76				
523	Jackie Perry	1943–Sep	1948–49	Wing	134	85	112	0 ^²	479			Yorkshire	
281	George R. Peters	1921–Nov	1923–24	Wing	22	7	0	0	21				From (near) Wakefield
1264	Matthew Peterson	2008	2009	Wing	16	4	0	0	16				
26	Peter Phillips	1895–Oct	1895–96	Forward	2	0	0	0	0				
126	Harry Pickard	1903–Feb	1902–03	Forward	3	0	0	0	0				
398	Nat Pickard	1934–Jan	1937–38	Stand-off	44	1	1	0 ^²	5				
895	Clive Pickerill	1981–Nov	1984–85	Scrum-half	79	9	0	16	44				
532	Jack Pickersgill	1944–45	1944–45	Wing	1	0	0	0	0				
264	Percy Pickersgill	1921–Jan	1920–21	Fullback	1	0	0	0	0				
251	Thomas Pickup	1920–Aug	1928–29	Centre	257	43	14	0 ^²	157			Yorkshire	
904	George Pieniazek	1982–Apr	1981–82	Wing	2	1	0	0	3				
575	Jonty Pilkington	1949–Jan	1949–50	Prop	19	0	1	0 ^²	2				
1261	Jay Pitts	2008	present	Second-row	185	28	0	0	112				Left in 2009 & returned in 2020
1064	Robert Piva	1994–95	1994–95	Prop	18	3	0	0	12				
864	Adrian Plummer	1979–Apr	1980–81	Fullback	4	0	0	0	0				Dewsbury early-1980s
687	Derek Plumstead	1964–Jan	1965–66	Prop	49	2	0	0	6				
1144	Willie Poching	1999	2001	Loose forward	74	21	1	0	86	(c)		Samoa	
236	Charlie Pollard	1919–Aug	1932–Dec	Fullback, Centre	385	39	654	0 ^²	1425	(c)		Great Britain & Yorkshire	
330	Ernest Pollard	1927–Mar	1936–Apr	Centre	260	54	319	0 ^²	800	(c)		Great Britain, England & Yorkshire	
835	Keith Pollard	1977–Feb	1976–77	Prop	1	0	0	0	0				
383	Lionel Pollard	1932–Nov	1932–Nov	Fullback	2	0	0	0	0				
470	Jack Pollitt	1940–Sep	1940–Dec	Fullback	15	0	14	0 ^²	28				
1323	Justin Poore	2013	2013	Prop	24	2	0	0	8				Australian
177	Arthur Poppleton	1909–Feb	1908–09	Forward	1	0	0	0	0				
436	Harry Potter	1937–Nov	1938–Jan	Wing	6	3	0	0	9				
952	Steve Potts	1985–Apr	1990–91	Prop	18	0	0	0	0				
1068	Daio Powell	1994–95	1994–95	Centre	18	5	0	0	20			Wales	
643	Harold Poynton	1958–Feb	1969–70	Stand-off	319	62	16	0 ^²	218	(c)	CFx2 CCx2 Lance Todd Trophy	Great Britain & Yorkshire	
155	Tommy Poynton	1906–Feb	1914–15	Centre	207	111	6	0 ^²	345			England & Yorkshire	
??	Oliver Pratt	2023	present	Centre, Wing	62	23	0	0	92				
1154	Steve Prescott	2000	2000	Fullback	25	3	13	0	38			Ireland	
27	Arthur Price	1895–Oct	1895–96	Wing	36	0	0	0	0				
997	Gary Price	1987–Oct ^¹	2001	Back Row	220	35	0	0	140	(c)		Great Britain	
184	Harry Price	1910–Mar	1911–Apr	Wing	2	0	0	0	0				
36	Horace Price	1895–Dec	1905–06	Wing	223	74	2	0 ^²	226				Welsh, to Salford
1013	Ray Price	1989–Oct	1989–90	Loose forward	25	6	0	0	24				
669	Jan Prinsloo	1961–Feb	1962–63	Wing	48	45	0	0	135				
724	Bernard Prior	1966–Oct	1967–68	Hooker	27	1	0	0	3		CF		
1101	Andy Proctor	1996	1998	Second-row	45	5	0	0	20				
??	Kevin Proctor	2023	2024	Second-row	48	1	0	0	4				New Zealander
1247	Waine Pryce	2007	2007	Wing	13	5	0	0	20				
69	Francis Edward Quarmby	1898–Jan	1897–98	Forward	4	0	0	0	0				
198	William Quarmby	1912–Nov	1912–Dec	Wing	5	1	0	0	3				
346	H. S. Quinn	1928–Oct	1929–Apr	Second-row	19	0	0	0	0				
224	Harry Quinn	1919–Jan	1921–Oct	Stand-off	9	1	0	0	3				
214	Harry Rafter	1913–Nov	1923–Apr	Forward	116	5	0	0	15				
1314	Andy Raleigh	2012	2014	Prop	58	7	0	0	28				
1092	Mick Ramsden	1996	1997		40	5	0	0	20				
498	… Ramsden	1942–Jan	1942–Jan	Second-row	1	0	0	0	0				
400	William Ramsden	1934–Mar	1936–May	Second-row	3	0	0	0	0				
1105	Julian Ramsey	1997–Jan	1997	Wing	2	1	0	0	4				
963	Neville Ramsey	1985–Nov	1985–86	Utility Back	1	0	0	0	0				
555	Ronald Ramsey	1946–Oct	1946	Scrum-half	1	0	0	0	0				
745	Terry Ramshaw	1968–Aug	1971–72	Prop	81	15	0	0	45				
712	Jimmy Randall	1965–Oct	1965–66	Utility Back	1	0	0	0	0				
1386	Tyler Randell	2017	2019	Hooker	42	8	1	0	30				
829	John Rangeley	1976–Nov	1976–77	Prop	2	0	0	0	0				
1173	Ben Rauter	2001	2001	Hooker, Second-row	23	4	0	0	16				Australian
707	Laiti Ravouvou	1965–Aug	1965–66	Second-row	1	0	0	0	0				
1040	Andy Raw	1993–Apr	1993–94	Wing	3	0	0	0	0				
350	Steve Ray	1928–Nov	1931–Nov	Wing	93	53	0	0	159			Wales	
367	Joseph Raynard	1931–Mar	1934–Feb	Stand-off	23	4	0	0	12				
814	Keith Rayne	1975–Aug ^¹	1989–90	Prop, Second-row	157	33	0	0	110	(c)		Great Britain, England & Yorkshire	Brother of Kevin Rayne
816	Kevin Rayne	1975–Oct	1981–82	Second-row	115	18	0	0	54				Brother of Keith Rayne
844	Steve Reed	1977–Oct	1979–80	Wing	12	2	0	0	6				
1016	Mark Reeves	1990–Apr	1989–90	Centre	1	0	0	0	0				
300	Peter Reid	1924–Jan	1925–26	Centre	46	7	0	0	21				From (near) Selkirk, Scottish Borders
1254	Paul Reilly	2008	2008	Fullback	8	1	0	0	4				
??	Ben Reynolds	2019	2019	Stand-off, Scrum-half	6	1	0	0	4				
549	Frank Reynolds	1945–Apr	1953–54	Wing	44	18	0	0	54				
34	… Rhodes	1895–Nov	1895–96	Centre	4	0	0	0	0				
1135	Sean Richardson	1998	1999	Second-row	13	0	0	0	0				
833	Keith Riggs	1977–Jan	1977–78	Wing	43	8	0	0	24				
1106	Craig Rika	1997–Jan	1998	Centre	38	17	9	0	86				
1340	Chris Riley	2014	2015	Wing, Fullback	47	18	0	0	72				
141	John Riley	1904–Sep	1908–09	Forward	78	3	0	0	9				
1195	Julien Rinaldi	2002 ^¹	2011	Hooker	37	6	0	0	24				
886	Adrian Ripley	1981–Sep	1981–82	Second-row	2	0	0	0	0				
601	Dennis Ripley	1952–Aug	1955–Dec	Fullback	5	4	0	0	12				
54	Arthur Roberts	1896–Dec	1896–97	Forward	1	0	0	0	0				
437	R. Roberts	1937–Nov	1937–Dec	Wing	3	1	0	0	3				
1227	Craig Robinson	2005	2005	Prop	1	0	0	0	0				
848	Dean Robinson	1978–Mar	1979–80	Second-row	13	2	0	0	6				
584	Don Robinson	1950–Mar	1955–56	Second-row	199	76	0	0	228	(c)		Great Britain, England, Rugby League XIII & Yorkshire	
355	Gilbert Robinson	1929–Nov	1933–Aug	Centre	91	28	18	0 ^²	120			Great Britain non-Test matches	
970	Kevin Robinson	1986–Mar	1985–86	Stand-off	8	1	0	0	4				
553	Norman Robinson	1946–Apr	1947–48	Stand-off	19	4	0	0	12				
420	Selwyn Robinson	1936–Feb	1936–Feb	Hooker	1	0	0	0	0				
??	Ky Rodwell	2024	present	Prop, Second-row, Loose forward	35	16	0	0	64				
284	Ernest Rogers	1922–Aug	1925–26	Stand-off	56	11	0	0	33				From (near) Featherstone
313	Johnny Rogers	1925–Jan	1925–26	Stand-off	113	17	14	0 ^²	79				
624	Ken Rollin	1955–Aug	1963–64	Halfback	212	92	0	0	276		CC		
934	Steve Rollin	1984–Mar	1983–84	Fullback	5	0	0	0	0				
1208	Jamie Rooney	2003	2009	Halfback	128	68	337	22	968			England	Most goals in a match, and Drop Goals in a career for Wakefield Trinity
863	Tony Rose	1979–Apr	1981–82	Prop	16	0	0	0	0				
277	Albert Rosenfeld	1921–Sep	1923–24	Centre	68	17	0	0	51				
924	Andrew Ross	1983–Oct	1983–84	Prop	1	0	0	0	0				
908	Lindsay Rotherforth	1982–Aug	1988–89	Wing	94	40	0	0	140				
646	Gerry Round	1958–Mar	1968–69	Fullback	241	55	127	0 ^²	419		CCx3	Great Britain	
1030	Paul Round	1991–Oct	1993–94	Second-row	59	9	0	0	36				
??	Josh Rourke	2025	present	Fullback	15	7	0	0	28				
403	David Rowan	1934–Aug	1935–36	Loose forward	82	12	0	0	36				
131	Benjamin Rowley	1903–Apr	1902–03	Forward	1	0	0	0	0				
461	Harry Royal	1940–Apr	1940–Apr	Scrum-half	1	0	0	0	0				World War II guest?
387	John Rudd	1932–Dec	1932–33	Prop	18	0	0	0	0				
841	Adrian Rushton	1977–Apr	1976–77	Fullback	3	1	0	0	3				
689	Willis Rushton	1964–Feb	1966–67	Centre	70	22	0	0	66				
998	Julian Russell	1988–Feb	1988–89	Fullback	7	1	0	0	4				
??	Matty Russell	2025	2025	Fullback, Wing	7	6	0	0	24				
??	Oliver Russell	2025	2025	Stand-off, Scrum-half	7	2	0	0	8				
412	Mackie Ryan	1934–Dec	1937–38	Centre	70	21	11	0 ^²	85				
1336	Matt Ryan	2014	2015	Second-row	42	8	0	0	32				
129	Albert Harry Ryder	1903–Mar	1902–03	Forward	2	0	0	0	0				
1214	Justin Ryder	2004	2004	Wing	25	12	0	0	48				Australian
486	Ron Rylance	1941–Sep	1949–Dec	Stand-off	218	87	204	0 ^²	669	(c)	CC	England & Yorkshire	
??	Hugo Salabio	2023	2023	Prop	3	0	0	0	0				
1337	Jarrod Sammut	2014	2015	Stand-off	21	9	53	0	142			Malta	
685	David Sampson	1963–Sep	1965–66	Centre	26	10	4	0 ^²	38				
660	Malcolm Sampson	1959–Nov	1966–67	Prop	98	9	5	0 ^²	37		CC		
1155	Paul Sampson	2000	2000	Wing	18	8	0	0	24				
656	Trevor Sampson	1959–Sep	1961–62	Prop	12	0	0	0	0				
818	John Sanderson	1976–Jan	1977–78	Scrum-half	37	3	0	0	9				
219	Horace Sandom	1914–Nov	1919–May	Wing	17	3	0	0	9				
228	Willie Sandom	1919–Feb	1919–Mar	Wing	3	0	0	0	0				
499	Stan Satterthwaite	1942–Mar	1943–Feb	Second-row	3	1	0	0	3				World War II guest?
??	Junior Sa'u	2019	2019	Centre	3	0	0	0	0				On loan from Salford Red Devils
485	James "Jim" Saxton	1941–Sep	1941–Sep	Fullback	1	0	0	0	0				
1235	Tommy Saxton	2006	2006	Wing	15	2	0	0	8				
619	Len Scaife	1954–Dec	1954–55	Second-row	1	0	0	0	0				
124	Alf Schofield	1903–Jan	1902–03	Forward	1	0	0	0	0				
??	Cameron Scott	2025	present	Centre, Wing, Second-row	27	7	0	0	28				
434	F. Scott	1937–Oct	1937–Oct	Wing	1	0	0	0	0				
1341	Nick Scruton	2014	2016	Prop	77	11	0	0	44				
1246	Danny Sculthorpe	2007	2009	Prop	48	2	0	0	8				
1116	Paul Seabine	1997–Mar	1998	Wing	21	1	0	0	4				
510	Percy Searles	1942–Oct	1942–Oct	Stand-off	1	0	0	0	0				World War II guest?
737	Michael Seatter	1967–Oct	1968–69	Wing	9	1	2	0 ^²	7				Also played soccer for Jersey in 1970s
1199	Matt Seers	2003	2003	Centre	13	2	0	0	8				Australian
??	Innes Senior	2019	2023	Wing	32	15	0	0	60			Ireland	
531	Jack Senior	1944–45	1944–45	Prop	4	0	0	0	0				
380	George Shackleton	1932–Sep	1932–Sep	Wing	2	0	0	0	0				
966	Greg Sharp	1986–Feb	1985–86	Centre	1	2	0	0	8				
385	Stanley Sharp	1932–Nov	1932–Nov	Hooker	1	0	0	0	0				
475	Jack Sharpe	1940–Oct	1940–Oct	Wing	1	1	0	0	3				
722	Ted Sharpe	1966–Sep	1966–67	Prop	1	0	0	0	0				
647	Henry Sharratt	1958–Mar	1958–59	Prop	3	2	0	0	6				
??	Jamie Shaul	2022	2022	Fullback, Wing	6	1	0	0	4				
938	Alan Shaw	1984–Sep	1986–87	Hooker	59	1	0	0	3				
??	Isaac Shaw	2023	2025	Prop	6	0	0	0	0				
594	Joby Shaw	1951–Apr	1958–59	Hooker	194	35	0	0	105			Yorkshire, (Great Britain, Yorkshire at Halifax)	
1060	Mark Sheals	1994–Apr	1994–95	Prop	24	0	0	0	0				
52	Reg Shean	1896–Oct	1896–97	Forward	1	0	0	0	0				
777	Les Sheard	1972–Mar	1979–80	Fullback	171	31	5	0 ^²	103			England & Yorkshire	
984	Ian Sheldon	1987–Jan	1989–90	Loose forward	63	9	0	0	36				
1019	Adrian Shelford	1990–Sep	1991–92	Prop	36	2	0	0	8				
691	George Shepherd	1964–Mar	1968–69	Hooker	114	10	0	0	30		CF		
544	Bill Sherwood	1944–45	1944–45	Loose forward	1	1	0	0	3				World War II guest?
1327	Ben Shulver	2013	2014	Prop	1	1	0	0	4				
151	Walter Siddle Jr.	1905–Nov	1906–07	Forward	26	0	0	0	0				
476	Frank Siddle	1940–Oct	1942–Mar	Wing, Loose forward	12	4	0	0	12				
111	Walter Siddle	1902–Sep	1902–03	Forward	2	0	0	0	0				
144	Ezra Sidwell	1904–Dec	1911–12	Centre	165	47	9	0 ^2	159		CC		
1342	Harry Siejka	2014	2014	Stand-off	9	1	0	0	4				
1351	Mickaël Simon	2015	2016	Prop	49	14	0	0	56			France	
916	Kevin Simpkin	1983–Mar	1982–83	Fullback	3	1	0	0	4				
166	William Simpson	1906–Nov	1913–14	Wing	182	97	0	0	291		CC		
1038	Mark Sims	1993–Feb	1992–93	Wing	2	0	4	0	8				
??	Jack Sinfield	2026	present	Stand-off, Scrum-half	2	0	0	0	0				
1324	Brad Singleton	2013	2013	Second-row	1	0	0	0	0				
1360	Michael Sio	2015	2017	Hooker, Lock, Second-row	45	16	0	0	64				
235	Archie Siswick	1919–Aug	1929–30	Fullback, Centre	317	43	3	0 ^²	135			Yorkshire	related to Morton Siswick?
130	Morton Siswick	1903–Mar	1902–03	Centre	8	2	0	0	6			Yorkshire	related to Archie Siswick?
651	Alan Skene	1958–Dec	1962–63	Centre	136	69	0	0	207		CCx2	South Africa	
801	Trevor Skerrett	1974–Aug	1979–80	Prop, Second-row	203	26	0	0	78			Great Britain & Wales	
143	Harry Slater	1904–Sep	1912–13	Halfback	182	62	12	0 ^²	210	(c)	CC	Yorkshire	
751	Keith Slater	1968–Oct	1971–72	Wing	118	82	13	0 ^²	272			Yorkshire	Most tries in a match (joint) for Wakefield Trinity
1005	Richard Slater	1988–Sep	1995–96	Loose forward, Halfback	134	16	0	0	64				
849	Tim Slatter	1978–Mar	1977–78	Second-row	1	0	0	0	0				
1182	Troy Slattery	2002	2003	Second-row	43	4	0	0	16				
199	Charles Smales	1912–Nov	1919–Dec	Fullback, Halfback	52	3	27	0 ^²	63				
59	Fred Smales	1897–Sep	1900–01	Forward	112	3	0	0	9				To Bradford F.C.
193	Harry Smales	1911–Dec	1911–Dec	Forward	1	0	0	0	0				
736	Thomas Smales	1967–Oct	1967–68	Scrum-half	5	0	0	0	0				
662	Derek Smart	1960–Jan	1959–60	Wing	1	1	0	0	3				
366	Freddie Smart	1930–Dec	1937–Apr	Wing	200	94	0	0	282				
44	Aaron Smith	1896–Feb	1897–98	Halfback	3	0	0	0	0				
813	Alan Smith	1975–Aug	1975–76	Wing	6	0	0	0	0				Australian, from Bramley, NOT Alan Smith
190	Charlie Smith	1911–Oct	1912–Oct	Fullback	37	1	49	0 ^²	101				
204	Charles Smith Jr.	1913–Feb	1915–Apr	Fullback	4	0	0	0	0				
1335	Daniel Smith	2014	2015	Prop	38	6	0	0	24				
772	David Smith	1971–Aug	1975–76	Wing	170	115	5	0 ^²	355			England & Yorkshire	Most tries in a season(joint) for Wakefield Trinity
577	Derek Smith	1949–Feb	1949	Centre	1	0	0	0	0				
397	Fred Smith	1934–Jan	1934–35	Centre	27	3	1	0 ^²	11				
628	Fred Smith	1956–Apr	1965–66	Wing	267	188	0	0	564		CCx2	Yorkshire	Most tries in a match (joint) & tries in a season(joint) for Wakefield Trinity
1102	Graeme Smith	1996	1996	Fullback	3	0	0	0	0				
??	Harvey Smith		present	Hooker			0	0					
1292	Jeremy Smith	2011	2011	Loose forward	10	1	0	0	4				New Zealander
661	Joe Smith	1959–Dec	1962–63	Prop	34	7	21	0 ^²	63				
845	Keith Smith	1977–Nov	1981–82	Centre, Stand-off	91	31	119	8	339			England	
1320	Lee Smith	2012	2013	Centre	35	18	64	2	202				
??	Morgan Smith	2023	2023	Stand-off, Scrum-half, Hooker	15	2	0	0	8				
1175	Richard Smith	2001	2001	Wing, Centre	12	1	0	0	4			Ireland	
620	Stan Smith	1954–Dec	1959–60	Wing	59	25	0	0	75				
333	Stanley Smith	1927–Sep	1930	Wing	81	32	0	0	96			Great Britain, Yorkshire, (England at Leeds)	
958	Stuart Smith	1985–Sep	1986–87	Second-row	45	11	0	0	44				
1308	Tim Smith	2012	2013	Scrum-half	51	8	0	0	32				
??	Tyson Smoothy	2026	present	Hooker, Loose forward	5	1	0	0	4				
942	Rod Snell	1984–Oct	1984–85	Centre	14	0	0	0	0				
1189	Steve Snitch	2002 ^¹	2009	Second-row	93	10	0	0	40				
1057	Bright Sodje	1994–Mar ^¹	2000	Wing	25	8	0	0	32				
1217	David Solomona	2004	2006	Second-row	79	26	0	0	104				
1151	Alfred Songoro	1999	1999	Wing	13	4	0	0	16				
1310	Steve Southern	2012	2012	Second-row	15	3	0	0	12	(c)			
1109	Roy Southernwood	1996	2001	Hooker	58	16	0	0	64	(c)			
1169	Waisale Sovatabua	2001	2003	Wing	54	25	0	0	100				
740	Ivan Spawforth	1967–Dec	1967–68	Wing	2	0	6	0 ^²	12				
1164	Andy Speak	2000	2000	Hooker	11	2	0	0	8				
947	Gary Spencer	1984–Nov ^¹	1994–95	Fullback	156	33	0	0	132				
738	Ray Spencer	1967–Oct	1972–73	Second-row	45	2	0	0	6				
1188	Rob Spicer	2002	2005	Wing, Centre, Second-row, Loose forward	46	4	0	0	16				
1288	Russell Spiers	2011	2011	Prop	2	0	0	0	0				
870	Colin Spink	1979–Oct	1979–80	Forward	1	0	0	0	0				
70	John Spofforth	1898–Jan	1898–99	Wing, Halfback	16	3	0	0	9				
976	Glenn Stanton	1986–Sep	1986–87	Centre	19	6	0	0	24				
664	Geoff Steel	1960–Apr ^¹	1968–69	Second-row	58	13	0	0	39				
658	Bob Steele	1959–Sep	1959–60	Hooker	1	0	0	0	0				
815	Owen Stephens	1975–Sep	1975–76	Wing	8	7	0	0	21				
1058	Francis Stephenson	1994–Mar	2000	Prop	113	10	0	0	40			England	
173	Harry Stephenson	1908–Jan	1919–20	Halfback	42	11	0	0	33				
530	J. H. Stephenson	1944–45		Centre	7	2	0	0	6				
906	Nigel Stephenson	1982–Aug	1984–85	Stand-off	80	25	11	13	120	(c)			
524	Jack Stevenson	1943–Nov	1943–Nov	Centre	1	0	0	0	0				
88	George Stickney	1900–Oct	1900–01	Forward	3	0	0	0	0				
107	Walter Stocks	1902–Sep	1902–03	Wing	4	0	0	0	0				
686	Malcolm Storey	1963–Sep	1965–66	Second-row	15	4	0	0	12				
591	Tony Storey	1951–Feb	1952–53	Second-row	63	21	0	0	63				
??	Matthew Storton	2025	present	Prop, Second-row	13	4	0	0	16				
1267	James Stosic	2009	2009	Prop	18	1	0	0	4				
534	Billy Stott	1944–45 ^¹	1947–48	Centre	103	30	199	0 ^²	488	(c)	CC & Lance Todd Trophy		
1139	Lynton Stott	1999	1999	Wing	23	5	6	1	33				
606	Arthur Street	1953–Jan	1952–53	Loose forward	6	1	0	0	3				
819	Chris Stringer	1976–Mar	1984–85	Hooker	29	2	0	0	6				
127	Herbert Strutt	1903–Mar	1902–03	Wing	6	1	0	0	3				
663	Maurice Sudell	1960–Jan	1960–61	Scrum-half	4	0	0	0	0				
60	John Sugden	1897–Sep	1897–98	Forward	27	8	0	0	24				
1085	Darren Summerill	1995–96	1995–96		5	0	0	0	0				
793	Mick Summers	1973–Sep	1973–74	Prop	1	0	0	0	0				
101	James Sunderland	1901–Oct	1901–02	Wing	5	0	1	0 ^²	2				
175	Tom Sunderland	1908–Oct	1909–10	Wing	21	14	0	0	42				
364	Arthur Sunley	1930–Nov	1930–Nov	Loose forward	1	0	0	0	0				
361	George Surguy	1930–Apr	1930–Apr	Second-row	4	0	0	0	0				
951	David Sutcliffe	1985–Apr	1984–85	Wing	1	0	0	0	0				
809	John Sutcliffe	1975–Mar	1979–80	Centre	63	20	0	0	60				
457	A. Swale	1940–Mar	1947–Oct	Stand-off	5	0	0	0	0				
910	Malcolm Swann	1982–Sep	1983–84	Second-row	49	3	0	0	9				
945	Don Swanston	1984–Oct	1985–86	Second-row	30	4	0	0	16				
597	Frank Sweeney	1952–Jan	1955–56	Wing	11	3	0	0	9				
442	J. W. Swift	1938–Apr	1940–Apr	Scrum-half	6	2	0	0	6				
935	Andrew Sygrove	1984–Apr	1989–90	Fullback	62	9	83	0	202				
1318	Paul Sykes	2012	2014	Stand-off	62	12	138	6	330				
1216	Semi Tadulala	2004 ^¹	2011	Wing	97	39	0	0	56				
1148	Ian Talbot	1999	1999	Hooker	15	2	31	0	70				
1218	Albert Talipeau	2004	2004	Wing	13	0	1	0	2				
??	Adam Tangata	2019	2021	Prop, Second-row	18	1	0	0	4			Cook Islands	
??	Kelepi Tanginoa	2019	2023	Prop, Second-row, Loose forward	88	21	0	0	84				
1359	Jordan Tansey	2015	2016	Fullback, Wing	8	1	4	0	12				
1179	Kris Tassell	2002	2002	Centre	27	12	0	0	48			Wales	
??	Will Tate	2026	present	Centre, Fullback, Wing	3	4	0	0	16				
1156	Tony Tatupu	2000	2001	Wing	24	3	0	0	12			Samoa	
??	Jorge Taufua	2023	2024	Centre, Wing	13	1	0	0	4				
1329	Taulima Tautai	2013	2014	Second-row	26	2	0	0	8				
170	George Taylor	1907–Sep	1920–21	Forward	242	18	80	0 ^²	214				Hooker against Australia in 1908
469	H. Taylor	1940–Sep	1948–Dec	Stand-off, Prop	31	0	0	0	0				
578	J. Taylor	1949–Apr	1949	Hooker	2	0	0	0	0				
153	Joseph Taylor	1906–Jan	1912–13	Forward	217	44	5	0 ^²	142		CC	Yorkshire	
1015	Paul Taylor	1990–Mar	1989–90	Stand-off, Hooker	1	0	0	0	0				Australian
389	S. Taylor	1933–Jan	1936–37	Second-row, Loose forward	11	0	0	0	0				
??	Neil Tchamambe	2025	present	Wing	0	0	0	0	0				
424	Billy Teall	1936–Oct	1947–48	Fullback	325	7	115	0 ^²	251		CC	Yorkshire	
479	Walter Tennant	1941–Feb ^¹	1946–Apr	Centre	7	5	0	0	15				
??	Jazz Tevaga	2026	present	Hooker, Loose forward	6	1	0	0	4				
337	A. E. Thomas	1928–Jan	1928–Jan	Prop	2	0	0	0	0				
301	Ned Thomas	1924–Feb	1927–28	Wing	82	36	0	0	108				
520	… Thomas	1943–Feb	1943	Prop	1	0	0	0	0				
659	Tony Thomas	1959–Oct	1966–67	Centre	80	15	0	0	45				
275	Arthur W. 'Cherry' Thompson	1921–Sep	1924–25	Wing	82	44	0	0	132			Yorkshire	From (near) Huddersfield
386	Ernest Thompson	1932–Dec	1933–34	Scrum-half	34	12	3	0 ^²	42			Yorkshire	
288	J. W. Thompson	1922–Dec	1923–24	Forward	11	0	0	0	0				From (near) Ferrybridge
860	John Thompson	1978–Dec	1997	Prop	302	22	0	0	77				Testimonial match 1988
1011	Mike Thompson	1989–Sep	1989–90	Prop	3	0	0	0	0				
??	Iain Thornley	2024	2024	Centre, Wing	24	7	0	0	28				
980	Gary Thornton	1986–Nov	1988–89	Wing	18	3	0	0	12				
311	Stanley Thorpe	1924–Oct		Wing	24	7	0	0	21				
19	George Thresh	1895–Sep	1902–Dec	Forward	185	18	0	0	54	(c)			
1006	Jason Timmins	1988–Sep	1992–93	Centre	7	0	0	0	0				
862	Steve Tinker	1979–Apr	1982–83	Centre, Stand-off	52	17	0	0	51				
??	Ugo Tison	2023	2023	Stand-off, Hooker	0	0	0	0	0				
16	Benjamin Todd	1895–Sep	1899–Oct	Fullback	70	0	0	0	0				
1004	Brent Todd	1988–Sep	1988–89	Prop	9	0	0	0	0				
309	George Todd	1924–Sep	1924–25	Wing	1	0	0	0	0				
218	John Todd	1914–Oct	1921–Feb	Wing	43	14	29	0 ^²	100			Yorkshire	
1143	Glen Tomlinson	1999	2000	Scrum-half	50	8	0	0	32				
1301	Ryan Tongia	2011	2011	Fullback	4	2	0	0	8				
790	Alan Tonks	1973–Mar	1974–75	Second-row	34	1	0	0	3				
804	Les Tonks	1974–Sep	1975–76	Prop	55	1	0	0	3				
1299	Motu Tony	2011	2012	Fullback	10	1	0	0	4				
746	David Topliss	1968–Sep ^¹	1987–88	Stand-off	428	196	2	12 ^²	606	(c)	Lance Todd Trophy	Great Britain, England & Yorkshire	
939	Andy Tosney	1984–Sep	1986–87	Stand-off	37	6	10	0	42				
506	H. Townend	1942–Sep	1942–Oct	Prop	2	1	0	0	3				
169	… Townend	1907–Apr	1907–08	Forward	3	0	0	0	0				
545	Frank Townsend	1944–45	1946–47	Centre	43	13	0	0	39				He was fatally injured in a match at Post Office Road, Featherstone in 1947
241	Harry Townsend	1919–Nov	1919–20	Scrum-half	6	0	0	0	0				From (near) Wakefield. Father of Frank Townsend
639	Ken Traill	1957–Dec	1958–59	Loose forward	28	1	0	0	3	(c)		Yorkshire	
1115	Ronnie Trautmann	1997–Mar	1997	Scrum-half	11	0	0	1	1				
1273	Shane Tronc	2010	2010	Prop	11	2	0	0	8				
1315	Kyle Trout	2012	2015	Prop	25	4	0	0	16				
1192	George Truelove	2002	2002	Wing	2	1	0	0	4				
??	Jake Trueman	2025	present	Fullback, Stand-off, Scrum-half	16	2	0	0	8				
1369	Anthony Tupou	2016	2016	Second-row, Lock	25	5	0	0	20				
1363	Bill Tupou	2015	2022	Centre, Wing	126	40	0	0	160				
688	Fred Turnbull	1964–Jan	1964–65	Second-row	22	3	0	0	9				
654	Derek Turner	1959–Mar	1966–67	Loose forward	213	45	0	0	135	(c)	CCx3	Great Britain, England, Yorkshire, Great Britain & France	
433	Horace Turner	1937–Oct	1940–41	Centre	94	35	3	0 ^²	111				
525	Joe Turner	1943–Dec	1943	Fullback	1	0	0	0	0				
465	Ronnie Turton	1940–May	1940–May	Wing	1	0	0	0	0				
407	Walter Turton	1934–Sep	1935–Jan	Second-row	3	0	0	0	0				
521	Anthony Twist	1943–Feb	1943	Loose forward	1	1	0	0	3				
152	Percy Unsworth	1905–Dec	1908–09	Forward	26	1	1	0 ^²	5				
??	Isaiah Vagana	2025	present	Prop, Second-row	40	3	0	0	12				
768	Rob Valentine	1970–Oct	1973–74	Second-row	129	10	1	0 ^²	32				
986	Gary Van Bellen	1987–Feb	1988–89	Prop	40	2	0	0	8				
580	Eric Varley	1949–Aug	1953–54	Wing, Centre	17	2	0	0	6				
14	William Varley	1895–Sep	1896–Mar	Halfback, Forward	5	0	0	0	0				
1073	Chris Vasey	1995–96	1995–96	Stand-off	4	0	0	0	0				
729	Nia Vaughan	1967–Jan	1967–68	Prop	10	1	0	0	3				
1284	Josh Veivers	2011	2011	Fullback, Wing	14	4	33	0	82				
492	Jack Vickers	1941–Dec	1941–Dec	Prop	1	0	0	0	0				
649	Don Vines	1958–Sep ^¹	1964–65	Prop, Second-row	185	10	0	0	30		CCx2	Great Britain & Wales	
1197	Adrian Vowles	2002	2003	Loose forward	29	6	1	0	26	(c)			
1043	Hugh Waddell	1993–Aug	1993–94	Prop	5	0	0	0	0			Great Britain, England & Scotland	
408	H. Wagstaffe	1934–Oct	1934–Nov	Prop	3	0	0	0	0				
950	Stuart Wainman	1985–Apr	1985–86	Stand-off	11	10	19	0	78				
1219	Michael Wainwright	2004	2005	Wing	31	8	0	0	32				
632	David Wakefield	1956–Sep	1960–61	Hooker	17	1	0	0	3				
1384	Adam Walker	2017	2017	Prop	7	0	0	0	0				
??	Alex Walker	2020	2021	Fullback	10	2	0	0	8			Scotland	
937	Andrew Walker	1984–Apr	1990–91	Hooker	14	1	0	0	3				
1361	Anthony Walker	2014	2017	Prop	18	1	0	0	4				
43	Arthur Walker	1896–Feb	1895–96	Forward	1	0	0	0	0				
??	Brad Walker	2020	2022	Stand-off, Loose forward	31	1	4	0	12				
894	Chris Walker	1981–Nov	1981–82	Stand-off	3	0	7	0	14				
477	Harry Walker	1940–Nov	1940–Nov	Wing, Centre	1	1	0	0	3				
405	Joseph Walker	1934–Sep	1935–Feb	Wing	8	0	0	0	0				
??	Lachlan Walmsley	2024	present	Fullback, Wing	51	42	2	0	172				Australian
245	… Walsh	1919–Dec	1919–20	Centre	4	1	0	0	3				
1302	Lucas Walshaw	2011	2014	Centre, Second-row	25	5	0	0	20				
342	… Walstowe	1928–Aug	1928–Aug	Centre	1	0	0	0	0				
893	Graham Walters	1981–Nov	1981–82	Centre	23	5	0	0	15			Wales	
592	David Walton	1951–Feb	1951–Mar	Second-row	2	1	0	0	3				
1371	Jason Walton	2016	2016	Centre, Second-row	18	0	0	0	0				
115	John Walton	1902–Oct	1912–13	Forward	317	13	0	0	33		CC		
45	R. Walton	1896–Mar	1895–96	Forward	1	0	0	0	0				
20	William Walton	1895–Sep	1901–Sep	Forward	192	30	2	0 ^²	92	(c)		Yorkshire	
851	David Wandless	1978–Apr ^¹	1985–86	Scrum-half	20	2	11	4	32				
148	Al Ward	1905–Sep	1908–09	Centre	45	5	3	0 ^²	21				
741	Bernard Ward	1967–Dec	1971–72	Scrum-half	54	9	94	0 ^²	215				
259	Bob Ward	1920–Oct	1920–Oct	Scrum-half	5	0	2	0 ^²	4				
??	John Ward	189?	????	Forward									Ex-England rugby union forward
319	Richard Ward	1925–Oct		Fullback	85	6	2	0 ^²	22				From (near) Bottomboat, near Stanley
702	Trevor Ward	1965–Jan	1964–65	Stand-off	3	0	0	0	0				
360	William Warrington	1930–Apr	1930–Apr	Fullback	2	0	0	0	0				
1312	Danny Washbrook	2012	2015	Loose forward, Second-row	114	15	0	0	60				
1237	Adam Watene	2006	2008	Prop	54	5	0	0	20				
1146	Frank Watene	1999	2001	Prop	66	6	0	0	24				
1153	Steve Watene	1999	1999	Second-row	1	0	0	0	0				
946	Darren Waters	1984–Oct	1984–85	Second-row	10	0	0	0	0				
326	Jenkyn Waters	1926–Sep		Hooker, Second-row	39	6	0	0	18				
1125	Ryan Waters	1998	1998		2	0	0	0	0				
823	David Watkinson	1976–May	1976–May	Hooker	3	0	0	0	0				David Watkinson?
419	Alf Watson	1936–Feb	1937–38	Loose forward	62	17	0	0	51				
440	J. E. Watson	1938–Jan	1939–40	Wing	67	22	0	0	66				
590	Jack Watson	1950–Nov	1952–53	Stand-off	12	3	0	0	9				
445	Walter Watson	1938–Oct	1939–Apr	Wing	4	1	0	0	3				
926	Brad Waugh	1983–Nov	1984–85	Prop	16	1	0	0	4				Australian
273	C. D. Webb	1921–Sep	1922–23	Second-row	28	0	0	0	0				
112	John Webster	1902–Sep	1904–05	Forward	91	1	0	0	3				
1029	Mark Webster	1991–Oct	1994–95	Prop	39	1	0	0	4				
176	W. Webster	1908–Nov	1908–09	Forward	2	0	0	0	0				
1198	Jon Wells	2003	2003	Wing	26	1	0	0	4				
767	Bryan West	1970–Sep	1971–72	Second-row	30	1	0	0	3				
15	Tom Westerby	1895–Sep	1895–Sep	Forward	1	0	0	0	0				
??	Joe Westerman	2020	2021	Stand-off, Prop, Loose forward	34	7	0	0	28			England	
1134	Ben Westwood	1998	2002	Centre	41	10	0	0	40			England & Yorkshire	
404	Edward Westwood	1934–Sep	1934–Sep	Prop	1	0	0	0	0				
109	William Westwood	1902–Sep	1902–03	Forward	14	0	0	0	0				
1084	Sonny Whakarau	1995–96 ^¹	1999	Second-row	64	12	0	0	48			Māori	
96	Edmund Wharton	1901–Sep	1901–02	Forward	1	0	0	0	0				
??	Jai Whitbread	2022	2023	Prop	39	4	0	0	16				Australian
1168	David White	2000	2000		1	0	0	0	0				
490	G. White	1941–Nov	1941–Dec	Fullback	4	0	4	0 ^²	8				
1231	Paul White	2006	2007	Wing	39	15	0	0	60			Jamaica	
294	Bob White	1923–Aug	1930–31	Hooker	240	9	1	0 ^²	29				from (near) Wigan
441	E. C. Whitehead	1938–Jan	1940–41	Wing	46	23	58	0 ^²	185				
351	H. J. Whitehead	1929–Apr	1931–Aug	Stand-off	18	1	0	0	3				
960	Keith Whiteman	1985–Oct	1986–87	Wing	27	9	0	0	36				
1061	Aaron Whittaker	1994–95	1994–95	Halfback	25	7	13	1	55			New Zealand, Canterbury	
418	G. T. Whittaker	1936–Jan	1936–Mar	Centre	8	2	0	0	6				
798	Harry Whittaker	1974–Mar	1973–74	Scrum-half	1	0	0	0	0				
24	Laurie Whittaker	1895–Sep	1901–02	Forward	134	20	15	0 ^²	90				
1232	Jon Whittle	2006	2006	Wing	11	3	0	0	12				
426	Wilfred Whitworth	1936–Dec	1942–43	Centre	107	28	1	0 ^²	86				
222	Fred Wilby	1919–Jan	1919–Feb	Centre	2	0	0	0	0				
432	Geoff Wilby	1937–Mar	1945–46	Second-row	19	1	0	0	3				
162	… Wilby	1906–Sep	1906–07	Forward	2	0	0	0	0				
189	John H. Wild	1911–Sep	1925–Jan	Wing	154	15	1	0 ^²	46				James Wild? Yorkshire? from (near) Outwood
940	Mark Wild	1984–Oct	1986–87	Centre	4	1	0	0	4				
	Matty Wildie	2010	2014	Stand-off, Hooker	42	4	1	0	18				
1258	Oliver Wilkes	2008 ^¹	2013	Prop	111	11	0	0	44			Scotland & Cumbria	
623	Ted Wilkins	1955–Apr	1955–56	Fullback	4	0	1	0 ^²	2				
920	Andrew Wilkinson	1983–Sep	1984–85	Prop	11	1	0	0	4				
305	C. Wilkinson	1924–Apr	1924–25	Hooker	2	0	0	0	0				From (near) Wakefield
357	Harry Wilkinson	1930–Jan	1949–Apr	Prop, Second-row	618	57	0	0	171	(c)	CC	England, Yorkshire	Most appearances in a career for Wakefield Trinity
657	Jack Wilkinson	1959–Sep	1963–64	Prop	151	10	0	0	30		CCx3	Great Britain, (England, Yorkshire, English League XIII at Halifax)	
918	Dean Williams	1983–Mar	1986–87	Loose forward	23	2	0	0	8				
??	Jordan Williams	2026	present	Prop, Second-row	2	0	0	0	0				
1378	Sam Williams	2017	2017	Scrum-half	24	6	26	0	76				
675	Dennis Williamson	1961–Oct	1962–63	Second-row	23	3	0	0	9			CC	
203	William Willis	1913–Feb	1913–Mar	Forward	5	1	0	0	3				
341	… Wilmer	1928–Apr	1928–Sep	Centre	2	0	0	0	0				
1003	Andrew Wilson	1988–Sep	1996	Wing	195	74	0	0	296				
119	Leonard Wilson	1902–Dec	1902–03	Wing	3	1	0	0	3				
698	Nigel Wilson	1964–Oct	1964–65	Prop	1	0	0	0	0				
903	Ricky Winterbottom	1982–Apr	1981–82	Stand-off	3	0	0	0	0				
1270	Frank Winterstein	2009	2009	Wing	6	0	0	0	0				
293	Fred Womersley	1923–Aug	1923–24	Wing	2	0	0	0	0				from (near) Kinsley, West Riding of Yorkshire
456	Billy Wood	1940–Mar	1940–Mar	Wing	1	1	0	0	3				
278	Fred Wood	1921–Oct	1921–22	Forward	1	0	0	0	0				
123	Herbert Wood	1903–Jan	1904–05	Forward	51	1	0	0	3				
??	Josh Wood	2020	2021	Stand-off, Scrum-half, Hooker	17	1	0	0	4				
1313	Kyle Wood	2012; 2017	2013; 2021	Scrum-half, Hooker	165	27	1	0	110				
1180	Nathan Wood	2002	2002	Scrum-half	11	2	0	0	8				Australian
2	Robert Wood	1895–Sep	1895–Oct	Stand-off, Scrum-half	3	0	0	0	0		Yorkshire		
237	Joseph Woodcock	1919–Aug	1922–23	Scrum-half	46	4	4	0 ^²	20				
174	Joseph Woodhall	1908–Sep	1908–09	Wing	6	6	0	0	18				
41	Joe Woodhead	1896–Jan	1895–96	Forward	17	0	0	0	0				
1044	David Woods	1993–Sep	1993–94	Prop	18	6	0	0	24	(c)			
695	Derek Woolley	1964–Sep	1965–66	Centre	7	2	17	0 ^²	40				
216	Edgar Woolley	1914–Apr	1919–Aug	Wing	36	10	0	0	30				
923	Glenn Worne	1983–Oct	1983–84	Centre	11	2	1	0	10				Australian
693	Geoffrey Wraith	1963–May ^¹	1984–85	Fullback, Centre	227	46	15	0	168			Yorkshire	
1072	Jon Wray	1995–96	1998	Wing	92	32	0	0	108				
1187	Matt Wray	2002	2003	Wing	17	2	0	0	8				
1183	David Wrench	2002	2006	Prop	90	6	0	0	24				
867	Craig Wright	1979–Apr	1982–83	Hooker	11	0	0	0	0				
1023	Nigel Wright	1990–Oct ^¹	1994–95	Stand-off	52	12	65	17	195			England	
783	Geoff Wriglesworth	1972–Oct	1976–77	Wing, Centre	62	19	0	0	57			Great Britain; England	
95	Ernest Wroe	1901–Sep	1901–02	Forward	5	0	0	0	0				
1365	Andy Yates	2015	2016	Prop	11	0	0	0	0				
785	Gordon Young	1972–Oct	1972–73	Second-row	3	0	0	0	0				
447	Victor Young	1938–Dec	1939–Dec	Wing, Centre, Stand-off	8	2	0	0	6				
961	Wally Youngman	1985–Nov	1985–86	Wing	4	0	0	0	0				
987	Tony Zelei	1987–Feb	1989–90	Stand-off	17	2	0	0	8				

- ^¹ = Played For Wakefield Trinity (Wildcats) During More Than One Period
- ^² = Prior to the 1974–75 season all goals, whether; conversions, penalties, or drop-goals, scored two points, consequently prior to this date drop-goals were often not explicitly documented, and "0 ^²" indicates that drop-goals may not have been recorded, rather than no drop-goals scored. In addition, prior to the 1949–50 season, the archaic Field-goal was also still a valid means of scoring points.
- BBC = BBC2 Floodlit Trophy
- CC = Challenge Cup
- CF = Championship Final
- CM = Captain Morgan Trophy
- RT = League Cup, i.e. Player's No. 6, John Player (Special), Regal Trophy
- YC = Yorkshire County Cup
- YL = Yorkshire League

== 'A' team (reserve grade) rugby league players disabled/killed in World War I ==
- … Oakley
- … Ogley
- B. Ward
- R. Ward

== Pre-1895 rugby union players (incomplete) ==
No.	Name	Debut	Position	captain (c)	Cap(s)	Records/Notes
	E. Alfred "Freddy" Ash	circa-1888			Yorkshire	Two games during the 1887–88 season against Middlesex at the Queen's Club, and against Cheshire at Birkenhead
	Thomas Oliver Bennett	circa-1873			Yorkshire	
	Christopher Edward "Teddy" Bartram	circa-1883			North of England, Yorkshire	
	James "Jim" Bedford				Yorkshire	
	William "Billy" Binks				Yorkshire	
	Paul Booth				Yorkshire	
	F. Crowther	circa-1883				
	Harry Dawson	circa-1883				
	Ralph Dunn		Half-back			Expelled from Wakefield Trinity for consuming alcoholic drinks the night before the 1888–89 Yorkshire Cup semi-final defeat by Liversedge RFC, he was later reinstated.
	William "Bill" Ellis	circa-1883			Yorkshire	
	Herbert Fallas				England, Yorkshire	
	J. R. Fallas	circa-1883				
	A. Fisher	circa-1883				
	J. Gomersal				Yorkshire	
	Harper Hamshaw	circa-1883			Yorkshire	
	T. B. Hartley	circa-1883				
	Arthur Hayley				Yorkshire	
	Harry Hayley				Yorkshire	
	Herbert Hutchinson	circa-1883			North of England, Yorkshire,	Chairmen of the RFU Council 1900–1901???
	W. Jackson	circa-1883			Yorkshire	
	Hampton Jones	circa-1883	Forward	(c)		from Dewsbury RFC
	Joseph "Joe" H. Jones				North of England, Yorkshire	(not Joseph "Joe" Jones)
	George Jubb	circa-1883	Forward		Yorkshire	
	Barron Kilner				England, Yorkshire	
	John William Kilner				Yorkshire	
	Joseph "Joe" Latham	circa-1883			Yorkshire	
	Ben Longbottom				Yorkshire	
	Frederick William Lowrie				England, Yorkshire	New Zealand Natives at The Spa, Gloucester on 2 February 1889
	Osbert Mackie	≤1895		(c)	Yorkshire	
	B. Oldroyd	circa-1883				
	T. B. Perry	circa-1883				
	Fred Ross		Forward			Expelled from Wakefield Trinity for consuming Alcoholic drinks the night before the 1888–89 Yorkshire Cup semi-final defeat by Liversedge RFC
	J. Scaife	circa-1883				
	T. Shires	circa-1883				
	Edmund J. Spink				Yorkshire	
	George Steele	circa-1883			Yorkshire	
	Jim Tattersall	circa-1883				
	Herbert Ward	circa-1883			Yorkshire	Unlikely to be Herbert Ward?
	Herbert Whiteley	circa 1883			Yorkshire	
	Rufus Ward	circa-1875				
	Thomas "Tommy" Wordsworth				Yorkshire	

== Sources ==
- Lindley, John (1960). Dreadnoughts – A HISTORY OF Wakefield Trinity F. C. 1873 – 1960. John Lindley Son & Co Ltd.
- Lindley, John (1973). 100 Years of Rugby, The History of Wakefield Trinity 1873–1973. John Lindley Son & Co Ltd.
- "Wakefield Trinity Wildcats". Rugby League Project.
- "Heritage Numbers Released". Wakefield Wildcats. 21 November 2014. Archived from the original on 22 December 2015.
