= Martyn Holland =

English rugby league footballer

Personal information
- Full name: Martyn Peter Holland
- Born: 21 March 1977 (age 48) Wakefield, England
- Height: 6 ft 1 in (1.85 m)
- Weight: 13 st 6 lb (85 kg)

Playing information
- Position: Fullback
Club
Years	Team	Pld	T	G	FG	P
1996–03	Wakefield Trinity Wildcats	119	23	0	0	76

Martyn Peter Holland (born 21 March 1977) is an English former professional rugby league footballer who played in the 1990s and 2000s. He played at club level for Crigglestone All Blacks ARLFC, Wakefield Trinity (Wildcats), as a fullback.

== Background ==
Martyn Holland was born in Barnsley, South Yorkshire, England.

== First Division Grand Final appearances ==
Martyn Holland played fullback, in Wakefield Trinity's 24-22 victory over Featherstone Rovers in the 1998 First Division Grand Final at McAlpine Stadium, Huddersfield on Saturday 26 September 1998.
