= George Thresh =

English rugby league footballer

Playing information
- Position: Forward
Club
Years	Team	Pld	T	G	FG	P
1895–02	Wakefield Trinity	185	18	0	0	54

George Thresh was a professional rugby league footballer who played in the 1890s and 1900s. He played at club level for Wakefield Trinity (captain), as a forward.

== Playing career ==
George Thresh made his début for Wakefield Trinity during September 1895, and he played his last match for Wakefield Trinity during December 1902.
