= Terence Hopwood =

English rugby league footballer

Personal information
- Full name: Terence Hopwood
- Born: first ¼ 1945 (age 79–80); Wakefield district, England

Playing information
- Position: Scrum-half
Club
Years	Team	Pld	T	G	FG	P
1964–66	Wakefield Trinity	23	9	0	0	27

Terence "Terry" Hopwood (birth registered first ¼ 1945) is an English former professional rugby league footballer who played in the 1960s. He played at club level for Wakefield Trinity, as a scrum-half.

== Background ==
Terry Hopwood's birth was registered in Wakefield district, West Riding of Yorkshire, England.
