= Willis Rushton =

English rugby league footballer

Personal information
- Full name: Willis Rushton
- Born: third ¼ 1936 (age 89–90) Pontefract district, England

Playing information
- Position: Centre
Club
| Years | Team | Pld | T | G | FG | P |
|---|---|---|---|---|---|---|
| 1959–64 | Bramley | 136 | 37 | 0 | 0 | 114 |
| 1964–67 | Wakefield Trinity | 70 | 22 | 0 | 0 | 66 |
| | Total | 206 | 59 | 0 | 0 | 180 |

Willis Rushton (birth registered third ¼ 1936) is an English former professional rugby league footballer who played in the 1960s. He played at club level for Bramley and Wakefield Trinity, as a centre.

== Background ==
Willis Rushton's birth was registered in Pontefract district, West Riding of Yorkshire, England.

== Playing career ==
Willis Rushton played his first game for Bramley RLFC on 15 August 1959, in a home game against Rochdale Hornets. Willis Rushton made his début for Wakefield Trinity during February 1964, and he played his last match for Wakefield Trinity during the 1966–67 season.
