= Herbert Finnigan =

English rugby league footballer

Personal information
- Born: fourth ¼ 1889; Wakefield district, England
- Died: c. Christmas 1915

Playing information
- Position: Wing, Centre
Club
Years	Team	Pld	T	G	FG	P
Sep 1913–Mar 1914	Wakefield Trinity	89	2	0	0	6

Herbert Finnigan (birth registered fourth ¼ 1889 – c. Christmas 1915) was an English professional rugby league footballer who played in the 1910s. He played at club level for Outwood Church ARLFC (in Outwood, Wakefield) and Wakefield Trinity, as a wing or centre.

== Background ==
Herbert Finnigan's birth was registered in Wakefield district, West Riding of Yorkshire, England, he was killed aged c. 26 during World War I, and he was the first Wakefield Trinity player to be killed.
