= George Land =

English rugby league footballer

Playing information
- Position: Centre
Club
Years	Team	Pld	T	G	FG	P
1920–≥20	Wakefield Trinity	88	2	0	0	6

George Land was a professional rugby league footballer who played in the 1920s. He played at club level for Wakefield Trinity, as a centre.

== Playing career ==
Land made his début for Wakefield Trinity during September 1920.
