= Rudi Hasse =

South African rugby footballer

Personal information
- Full name: Rudolph Hasse
- Born: 8 February 1935; Cape Town, South Africa
- Died: 17 May 2011; Cape Town, South Africa

Playing information
- Height: 6 ft 4.5 in (194 cm)

Rugby union
- Position: Lock Forward
Club
Years	Team	Pld	T	G	FG	P
≤1962–62	Western Province

Rugby league
- Position: Second-row
Club
Years	Team	Pld	T	G	FG	P
1962–Dec 63	Bradford Northern
Jan 1964–≥64	Wakefield Trinity	8	2	0	0	6
	Total	8	2	0	0	6

Rudolph "Rudi" Hasse (birth unknown) is a South African rugby union and professional rugby league footballer who played in the 1960s. He played club level rugby union (RU) for Western Province, and club level rugby league (RL) for Bradford Northern and Wakefield Trinity, as a second-row.

== Playing career ==
Rudi Hasse transferred from rugby union to rugby league with Bradford Northern, he was transferred from Bradford Northern to Wakefield Trinity, he made his début for Wakefield Trinity during April 1964, and he played his last match for Wakefield Trinity during the 1964–65 season.
