= 2016 Wakefield Trinity Wildcats season =

- Super League rank: 8th
- Play-off result: N/A
- Challenge Cup: Semi-finals

Team information
- Chairman: Michael Carter
- Head Coach: Chris Chester (was Brian Smith)
- Captain: Danny Kirmond
- Stadium: Belle Vue
← 2015	2017 →

This article details the Wakefield Trinity Wildcats rugby league football club's 2016 season.

== Results ==
=== Super League ===
==== Super League table ====
Pos	Team	Pld	W	D	L	PF	PA	PD	Pts	Qualification
1	Hull F.C.	23	17	0	6	605	465	+140	34	Super League Super 8s
2	Warrington Wolves	23	16	1	6	675	425	+250	33	Super League Super 8s
3	Wigan Warriors	23	16	0	7	455	440	+15	32	Super League Super 8s
4	St Helens	23	14	0	9	573	536	+37	28	Super League Super 8s
5	Catalans Dragons	23	13	0	10	593	505	+88	26	Super League Super 8s
6	Castleford Tigers	23	10	1	12	617	640	−23	21	Super League Super 8s
7	Widnes Vikings	23	10	0	13	499	474	+25	20	Super League Super 8s
8	Wakefield Trinity Wildcats	23	10	0	13	485	654	−169	20	Super League Super 8s
9	Leeds Rhinos	23	8	0	15	404	576	−172	16	The Qualifiers
10	Salford Red Devils	23	10	0	13	560	569	−9	14 (Note: Salford deducted 6 points for salary cap breaches in 2014 and 2015.)	The Qualifiers
11	Hull Kingston Rovers	23	6	2	15	486	610	−124	14	The Qualifiers
12	Huddersfield Giants	23	6	0	17	511	569	−58	12	The Qualifiers

Source: Rugby League Project
Rules for classification: 1) Points; 2) Points difference; 3) Number of points scored;

==== Super League results ====
W Win D Draw L Loss

Date	Round	Versus	H/A	Venue	Result	Score	Tries	Goals	Attendance	Report
7 February	1	Widnes Vikings	H	Belle Vue	L	16–24	Howarth, Lyne, Sio	Finn (2/3)	5,240	
14 February	2	Castleford Tigers	A	The Jungle	L	6–40	Howarth	Finn (1/1)	9,761	
21 February	11	Hull Kingston Rovers	A	Craven Park	W	14–12	Simon, Howarth	Finn (3/3)	7,207	
26 February	3	Warrington Wolves	A	Halliwell Jones Stadium	L	16–34	Hall, A.Tupou, Molloy	Finn (2/3)	10,631	
6 March	4	Catalans Dragons	H	Belle Vue	L	28–42	A.Tupou, Arundel, Lyne, Johnstone, Simon	Finn (4/5)	4,442	
11 March	5	St. Helens	A	Langtree Park	L	4–44	Jones-Bishop	Finn (0/1)	10,008	
18 March	6	Hull F.C.	A	KC Stadium	L	4–22	Arundel	Finn (0/1)	9,600	
25 March	7	Huddersfield Giants	H	Belle Vue	W	36–22	Johnstone (2), Sio, Lyne, Jowitt, Scruton	Finn (6/6)	4,989	
28 March	8	Leeds Rhinos	A	Headingley Stadium	W	20–16	Ashurst, Miller, Hall	Finn (4/4)	16,314	
2 April	9	Salford Red Devils	H	Belle Vue	W	32–18	Sio, Miller, Johnstone (3), Lyne	Finn (4/6)	2,500	
10 April	10	Wigan Warriors	H	Belle Vue	W	62–0	Scruton (2), Miller (3), Johnstone, Finn, Kirmond (2), Jones-Bishop, Jowitt	Finn (9/11)	5,751	
24 April	12	Hull F.C.	H	Belle Vue	L	28–46	Gibson (3), Johnstone, Kirmond	Finn (4/6)	6,701	
29 April	13	Widnes Vikings	A	Halton Stadium	W	18–16	Hall, Tupou	Finn (5)	4,398	
15 May	14	Warrington Wolves	H	Belle Vue	W	36–28	Ashurst (2), Hall (2), Johnstone, Jones-Bishop	Finn (6)	5,180	
22 May	15	Catalans Dragons	N (Note: Magic Weekend)	St James' Park	W	25–24	Jones-Bishop (2), Simon, Sio	Finn (4), Miller (DG)	28,945	
27 May	16	Salford Red Devils	A	AJ Bell Stadium	L	8–38	Jones-Bishop, Tupou		3,022	
2 June	17	Hull Kingston Rovers	H	Belle Vue	L	16–54	Hall, Sio, Tupou	Finn (2)	5,082	
12 June	18	Huddersfield Giants	A	John Smiths Stadium	W	10–2	Kirmond	Finn (3)	5,077	
17 June	19	Leeds Rhinos	H	Belle Vue	L	6–32	Jones-Bishop	Finn	5,500	
3 July	20	St. Helens	H	Belle Vue	L	32–44	Miller (3), Finn, Johnstone, Jones-Bishop	Finn (4)	4,859	
8 July	21	Wigan Warriors	A	DW Stadium	L	18–22	Jones-Biship, Jowitt, Lyne	Finn (3)	11,821	
16 July	22	Catalans Dragons	A	Stade Gilbert Brutus	W	30–28	Hall, Jowitt, Molloy, Sio, Tupou	Finn (5)	8,562	
24 July	23	Castleford Tigers	H	Belle Vue	L	20–46	Arundel (2), Lyne, Miller	Finn (2)	6,855	

=== Super 8s ===
==== Super 8s table ====
Pos	Team	Pld	W	D	L	PF	PA	PD	Pts	Qualification
1	Warrington Wolves (L)	30	21	1	8	852	541	+311	43	Semi-finals
2	Wigan Warriors (C)	30	21	0	9	669	560	+109	42	Semi-finals
3	Hull F.C.	30	20	0	10	749	579	+170	40	Semi-finals
4	St Helens	30	20	0	10	756	641	+115	40	Semi-finals
5	Castleford Tigers	30	15	1	14	830	808	+22	31	
6	Catalans Dragons	30	15	0	15	723	716	+7	30	
7	Widnes Vikings	30	12	0	18	603	643	−40	24	
8	Wakefield Trinity	30	10	0	20	571	902	−331	20	

Source: BBC Sport
(C) Champions; (L) League Leaders' Shield Winners

==== Super 8s results ====
W Win D Draw L Loss

Date	Round	Versus	H/A	Venue	Result	Score	Tries	Goals	Attendance	Report
5 August	1	Wigan Warriors	H	DW Stadium	L	12–60	Arundel, Hall	Finn (2)	10,593	
14 August	2	Warrington Wolves	H	Belle Vue	L	10–38	Mazive, Molloy	Finn	3,552	
21 August	3	Widnes Vikings	A	Halton Stadium	L	8–40	Hall, Jones-Bishop		4,010	
2 September	4	Castleford Tigers	A	The Jungle	L	22–46	Johnstone (2), Lyne, Scruton, Tupou	Finn	6,298	
9 September	5	Catalans Dragons	H	Belle Vue	L	10–14	Hall, Jowitt	Finn	2,612	
15 September	6	Hull F.C.	H	Belle Vue	L	12–18	Arundel, Johnstone	Finn (2)	3,413	
23 September	7	St. Helens	A	Langtree Park	L	12–32	Hall, Johnstone	Finn (2)	9,516	

=== Challenge Cup ===
W Win D Draw L Loss

Date	Round	Versus	H/A	Venue	Result	Score	Tries	Goals	Attendance	Report
15 April	5	Sheffield Eagles	H	Belle Vue	W	44–10	Finn (2), Johnstone, Jones-Bishop, Arona (2), Simon, Sio	Finn 6/8	2,257	
8 May	6	Toulouse Olympique	H	Belle Vue	W	40–22	Johnstone (4), Ashurst, Hall, Miller	Finn (6/7)	2,539	
23 June	QF	Huddersfield Giants	A	John Smiths Stadium	W	28–16	Fifita (2), Johnstone, Jones-Bishop	Finn (6/7)	3,289	
30 July	SF	Warrington Wolves	N	Leigh Sports Village	L	12–56	Hall, Jowitt	Finn (2/2)	10,358	

== Players ==
=== Squad ===
No	Player
1	Ben Jones-Bishop
2	Tom Johnstone
3	Bill Tupou
4	Ashley Gibson
5	Judah Mazive
6	Jacob Miller
7	Liam Finn
8	Nick Scruton
9	Scott Moore
10	Anthony England
11	Michael Simon
12	Danny Kirmond
13	Anthony Tupou
13	Ben Harrison
14	Reece Lyne
16	Tinirau Arona
16	Frazer Morris
17	Matty Ashurst
18	Joe Arundel
19	Jon Molloy
20	Michael Sio
21	Max Jowitt
22	Jordan Crowther
23	Scott Anderson
24	Stuart Howarth
25	Craig Hall
26	Chris Annakin
27	Anthony Walker
28	Andy Yates
31	Jason Walton
32	James Batchelor
35	David Fifita
36	Bradley Moules

Source:RLP

=== 2016 transfers in/out ===
In

List of players joining Wakefield
Nat	Player	Moved from	Length	Announced
(England)	Anthony England	Warrington Wolves	2 Years	October 2015
(England)	Ben Shulver	Australia	2 Years	October 2015
(England)	Sean Morris	London Broncos	1 Year	October 2015
(Ireland)	Liam Finn	Castleford Tigers	2 Years	October 2015
(England)	Ashley Gibson	Castleford Tigers	2 Years	October 2015
(Tonga)	Bill Tupou	Canberra Raiders	1 Year	October 2015
(Wales)	Anthony Walker	St. Helens	2 Years	October 2015
(Australia)	Anthony Tupou	Cronulla Sharks	2 Years	November 2015
(Cook Islands)	Tinirau Arona	Cronulla Sharks	1 Year	November 2015
(England)	Ben Jones-Bishop	Salford Red Devils	1 Year	November 2015
(England)	Scott Moore	Castleford Tigers	2 Years	November 2015
(England)	Jason Walton	London Broncos	1 Year	December 2015

Out

List of players leaving Wakefield
Nat	Player	Moved to	Length	Announced
(England)	Danny Washbrook	Hull F.C.	1 Year	August 2015
(Ireland)	Anthony Mullally	Leeds Rhinos	3 Years	September 2015
(Scotland)	Ben Kavanagh	Widnes Vikings	Loan return	October 2015
(England)	Kyle Trout	Dewsbury Rams	1 Year	November 2015
(Australia)	Tim Smith	Retirement	N/A	November 2015
(New Zealand)	Ali Lauitiiti	New Zealand Warriors	1 Year	November 2015
(England)	Ian Kirke	Retirement	N/A	November 2015
(Malta)	Jarrod Sammut	Workington Town	2 Years	December 2015
(England)	Chris Riley	Rochdale Hornets	2 Years	December 2015
(Australia)	Dean Collis	Released		
(Samoa)	Pita Godinet	Released		
(New Zealand)	Kevin Locke	Released		
(Samoa)	Lopini Paea	Released		
(Australia)	Matt Ryan	Released		
(England)	Lee Smith	Released		
