= 2015 Wakefield Trinity Wildcats season =

- Super League rank: 12th
- Play-off result: Winners (Million Pound Game)
- Challenge Cup: 6th Round
- 2015 record: Wins: 8; draws: 0; losses: 25
- Points scored: For: 653; against: 1167

Team information
- Chairman: Michael Carter
- Head Coach: James Webster (to 19 May); Brian Smith (from 31 May)
- Captain: Danny Kirmond
- Stadium: Belle Vue

Top scorers
- Tries: Jacob Miller - 15
- Goals: Craig Hall - 41
- Points: Craig Hall - 98
← 2014	2016 →

In 2015, Wakefield Trinity Wildcats competed in the Super League and subsequently the Qualifiers and the Million Pound Game of the newly introduced play-off system. The also competed in the 2015 Challenge Cup.

Wakefield won their opening two Super League fixtures, but by the time their next league win came in July they were bottom of the table and it had already been confirmed that they would be competing in the Qualifiers at the end of the regular season. Wakefield finished the Qualifiers in fourth place and defeated Bradford Bulls in the Million Pound Game to retain their place in the Super League the following season.

== Results ==
=== Super League ===
==== Table ====
Pos	Team	Pld	W	D	L	PF	PA	PD	Pts	Qualification
1	Leeds Rhinos	23	16	1	6	758	477	+281	33	Super League Super 8s
2	St Helens	23	16	0	7	598	436	+162	32	Super League Super 8s
3	Wigan Warriors	23	15	1	7	589	413	+176	31	Super League Super 8s
4	Huddersfield Giants	23	13	2	8	538	394	+144	28	Super League Super 8s
5	Castleford Tigers	23	13	0	10	547	505	+42	26	Super League Super 8s
6	Warrington Wolves	23	12	0	11	552	456	+96	24	Super League Super 8s
7	Hull F.C.	23	11	0	12	452	484	−32	22	Super League Super 8s
8	Catalans Dragons	23	9	2	12	561	574	−13	20	Super League Super 8s
9	Widnes Vikings	23	9	1	13	518	565	−47	19	The Qualifiers
10	Hull Kingston Rovers	23	9	0	14	534	646	−112	18	The Qualifiers
11	Salford Red Devils	23	8	1	14	447	617	−170	17	The Qualifiers
12	Wakefield Trinity Wildcats	23	3	0	20	402	929	−527	6	The Qualifiers

Source: Rugby League Project
Rules for classification: 1) Points; 2) Points difference; 3) Number of points scored;

==== Super League results ====
W Win D Draw L Loss

Super League results
Date	Round	Versus	H/A	Venue	Result	Score	Tries	Goals	Attendance	Live on TV	Report
8 February	1	Castleford Tigers	A	The Jungle	W	24–22	McShane, Godinet, Lauitiiti, Washbrook	Hall 4/4	10,728	-	
15 February	2	Hull Kingston Rovers	H	Belle Vue	W	44–24	Ashurst, Miller (3), Kirmond, Riley (3)	Hall 6/8	5,320	-	
1 March	3	Widnes Vikings	A	Halton Stadium	L	16–58	Owen, Ryan, Riley	Hall 2/3	5,810	-	
6 March	4	St. Helens	H	Belle Vue	L	16–20	Ashurst, Lyne, Owen	Hall 2/3	9,676	Sky Sports	
15 March	5	Salford Red Devils	A	AJ Bell Stadium	L	18–24	Miller, McShane, Hall	Hall 3/3	2,712	-	
22 March	6	Huddersfield Giants	H	Belle Vue	L	14–44	Collis, Kirmond, Crowther	Hall 1/3	4,354	-	
27 March	7	Wigan Warriors	A	DW Stadium	L	10–52	Riley, McShane	Hall 1/2	10,787	-	
2 April	8	Catalans Dragons	H	Belle Vue	L	4–40	Riley	Hall 0/1	3,015	-	
6 April	9	Leeds Rhinos	A	Headingley Stadium	L	22–48	T.Smith, Hall, Sammut, D.Smith	Hall 3/4	17,608	-	
11 April	10	Warrington Wolves	A	Halliwell Jones Stadium	L	0–80	-	-	8,036	-	
23 April	12	Wigan Warriors	H	Belle Vue	L	22–40	Hall, Kirmond, Godinet, Riley	Hall 3/4	3,107	Sky Sports	
1 May	13	St. Helens	A	Langtree Park	L	4–44	Johnstone	Miller 0/1	10,001	-	
7 May	14	Hull Kingston Rovers	A	Craven Park	L	6–54	Arundel	Hall 1/1	7,378	Sky Sports	
24 May	15	Widnes Vikings	H	Belle Vue	L	18–30	Johnstone, Ryan, Collis	Miller 3/3	3,132	-	
31 May	16	Castleford Tigers	N (Note: Magic Weekend)	St James' Park	L	16–56	Johnstone (2), D.Smith	Miller 2/3	26,970	Sky Sports	
7 June	17	Leeds Rhinos	H	Belle Vue	L	26–58	Johnstone (2), Godinet, Kirmond, Scruton	Hall 1/3, Godinet 2/2	4,000	-	
14 June	18	Salford Red Devils	H	Belle Vue	L	16–24	D.Smith, Kirke, Kirmond	Arundel 2/3	3,240	-	
20 June	19	Catalans Dragons	A	Stade Gilbert Brutus	L	12–32	Riley, Godinet	Miller 2/2	7,843	Sky Sports	
1 July	11	Hull F.C.	H	Belle Vue	W	26–16	Miller, Owen, Arundel, Ryan	Miller 5/5	3,543	-	
5 July	20	Hull F.C.	A	KC Stadium	L	24–31	Ashurst, Tansey, Lyne, Johnstone	Miller 4/4	9,558	-	
12 July	21	Warrington Wolves	H	Belle Vue	L	20–40	Miller (4)	Miller 1/3, Hall 1/1	3,354	-	
19 July	22	Castleford Tigers	H	Belle Vue	L	20–58	Lyne, Walker, Johnstone (2)	Arundel 2/4	4,000	-	
26 July	23	Huddersfield Giants	A	Galpharm Stadium	L	24–34	Miller, Anderson, Ashurst, L.Smith, Lyne	Hall 2/5	4,839	-	

=== Qualifiers ===
==== Table ====
Pos	Team	Pld	W	D	L	PF	PA	PD	Pts	Qualification
1	Hull Kingston Rovers	7	7	0	0	234	118	+116	14	2016 Super League
2	Widnes Vikings	7	5	0	2	232	70	+162	10	2016 Super League
3	Salford Red Devils	7	5	0	2	239	203	+36	10	2016 Super League
4	Wakefield Trinity Wildcats (W)	7	3	0	4	153	170	−17	6	Million Pound Game
5	Bradford Bulls	7	3	0	4	167	240	−73	6	Million Pound Game
6	Halifax	7	2	0	5	162	186	−24	4	2016 Championship
7	Sheffield Eagles	7	2	0	5	152	267	−115	4	2016 Championship
8	Leigh Centurions	7	1	0	6	146	231	−85	2	2016 Championship

Source: Rugby League Project
Rules for classification: 1) Points; 2) Points difference; 3) Number of points scored;
(W) Million Pound Game Winner

==== Qualifiers results ====
W Win D Draw L Loss

Qualifiers results
Date	Round	Versus	H/A	Venue	Result	Score	Tries	Goals	Attendance	Live on TV	Report
9 August	Q1	Salford Red Devils	A	AJ Bell Stadium	L	26–34	Miller (2), Washbrook, Lyne	L.Smith 5/5	3,400	-	
15 August	Q2	Bradford Bulls	H	Belle Vue	W	48–18	Molloy, Sio, Simon, Scruton, L.Smith, Lyne, Ashurst, Miller	L.Smith 7/8, Arundel 1/1	3,985	Sky Sports	
22 August	Q3	Leigh Centurions	A	Leigh Sports Village	W	17–16	L.Smith, Miller (2)	L.Smith 2/3, L.Smith 1 DG	4,376	Sky Sports	
6 September	Q4	Hull Kingston Rovers	A	Craven Park	L	18–20	Locke (2), L.Smith (2)	L.Smith 1/4	7,495	Sky Sports	
12 September	Q5	Widnes Vikings	H	Belle Vue	L	4–46	L.Smith	L.Smith 0/1	3,365	Sky Sports	
19 September	Q6	Halifax	H	Belle Vue	W	30–12	Sio (2), Simon, Mullally, Jowitt	Arundel 5/5	3,086	Sky Sports	
27 September	Q7	Sheffield Eagles	A	Bramall Lane	L	10–24	Kirmond, Kavanagh	Arundel 1/2	1,712	Sky Sports	

=== Million Pound Game ===
After the Super 8 Qualifiers, Wakefield Trinity Wildcats finished 4th in the table and Championship side Bradford Bulls finished 5th meaning that the two teams would meet in a play-off match, known as the Million Pound Game, to determine who would join Hull Kingston Rovers, Widnes Vikings and Salford Red Devils in next seasons Super League.

W Win L Loss

Million Pound Game
Date	Round	Versus	H/A	Venue	Result	Score	Tries	Goals	Attendance	Live on TV	Report
3 October	MPG	Bradford Bulls	H	Bell Vue	W	24–16	Kirmond, Mullally, Washbrook, Moore	Arundel 1/2, Tansey 3/3	7,236	Sky Sports	

2015 Million Pound Game
Bradford Bulls	positions	Wakefield Trinity Wildcats
1. Jake Mullaney	Fullback	34. Jordan Tansey
4. Matty Blythe	Winger	4. Reece Lyne
37. Dane Nielsen	Centre	39. Bill Tupou
3. Adrian Purtell	Centre	28. Joe Arundel
5. Danny Williams	Winger	24. Tom Johnstone
6. Lee Gaskell	Stand Off	6. Jacob Miller
7. Harry Seijka	Scrum half	14. Pita Godinet
8. Paul Clough	Prop	8. Nick Scruton
9. Adam O'Brien	Hooker	35. Michael Sio
10. Adam Sidlow	Prop	16. Michael Simon
11. Tom Olbison	2nd Row	12. Danny Kirmond
12. Dale Ferguson	2nd Row	13. Danny Washbrook
13. Danny Addy	Loose forward	26. Chris Annakin
14. Jay Pitts	Interchange	11. Ali Lauitiiti
17. Jean-Philippe Baile	Interchange	37. Anthony Mullally
31. Epalahame Lauaki	Interchange	40. Scott Moore
32. Steve Crossley	Interchange	41. Andy Yates
James Lowes	Coach	Brian Smith

=== Challenge Cup ===
W Win L Loss

Challenge Cup results
Date	Round	Versus	H/A	Venue	Result	Score	Tries	Goals	Attendance	Live on TV	Report
17 April	5	Halifax	H	Belle Vue	W	44–16	Owen (2), D.Smith, Riley, Hall, Washbrook, Kirke (2)	Hall 6/9	2,062	-	
17 May	6	Leigh Centurions	H	Belle Vue	L	30–36	Riley, Arundel (2), Scruton, Molloy	Hall 5/6	-	BBC Sport	

== Players ==
=== Player appearances: League ===
- Super League Only

FB=Fullback	C=Centre	W=Winger	SO=Stand-off	SH=Scrum half	PR=Prop	H=Hooker	SR=Second Row	L=Loose forward	B=Bench

No	Player	1	2	3	4	5	6	7	8	9	10	12	13	14	15	16	17	18	19	11	20	21	22	23	S1	S2	S3	S4	S5	S6	S7
1	Craig Hall	FB	FB	FB	FB	FB	FB	SH	FB	C	C	FB		FB			C					SO		SO							
2	Chris Riley	W	W	W	W	W	W	W	W	W	W	W	FB	W	W	W	W	W	W		W	W		W			W				
3	Dean Collis	C	C	C	C	C	C	C	C						C	C															
4	Reece Lyne	C	C	C	C	C						C	W	C	C	C			C	C	C	C	C	W	W	W	W	C	C		W
5	Richard Owen	W	W	W	W	W	W	FB	W	W	W	W			FB	FB	FB		B	W					W	W					
6	Jacob Miller	SO	SO	SO	SO	SO	SO		SO	SO	SO		L	SO	SO	SO		FB	FB	SH	SH	SH	SH	SH	SO	SO	SO	SO	SO	SO	SO
7	Tim Smith	SH	SH	SH	SH	SH	SH		SH	SH	SH	SH	SH	SH	SH	SH	SH	SH	SH						SH	SH	SH	SH	SH		
8	Nick Scruton	P	P	P	P	P	P	P	P	P		P	P	P	P	P	P	P	P	P		P	P	P	P	P	P	B	B	P	P
9	Paul McShane	H	H	H	B	H	B	B	H	H	H	H	H	H	H	H	B	B	H	H	B	H	B								
10	Scott Anderson	B	B	B										B	B	P						B	P	P	P	P	P	P	P		P
11	Ali Lauitiiti	B	B	B	B	B	SR	SR	B	B	B	B	B								B		SR				B	SR	SR		B
12	Danny Kirmond	P	SR	SR	SR	SR	SR		SR	SR	SR	SR			SR	SR	SR	SR													B
13	Danny Washbrook	SR	L	L	H	L	H	H	SR	SR	SR	SR	SR	SR	L	L	L	SR	L	B		SR	B	B	B	B	B	H	B	SR	SR
14	Pita Godinet	B	B	B		B				B	B	SO	SO	B	B	B	SO	SO	SO	SO						B	B	B	B	SH	SH
15	Matt Ryan	x	x	SR	SR	SR	L	SR	B	B	B	C	C	SR	SR	B	B	C	SR	SR	SR	B	x	x	x	x	x	x	x	x	x
16	Michael Simon	x	x	x	B	B	B	B	L		P	B	B	B		B	B	B	P	P			L	L	L	L	L	L	L	SR	SR
17	Matty Ashurst	x	SR	x	L	x	x	x	x	x	x	x	x	x	x	x	x	x	x	x	SR	SR	x	SR	SR	SR	SR	SR	SR	B	
18	Daniel Smith	SR	P	P	P	P	B	L	B	L	L	B	B	L		B	SR	L			B		SO								
19	Jon Molloy	x	x	x	x	x	x	x	x	x	x	x	SR	B	P	SR			B	L			SR	SR	SR	SR	SR				
20	Jarrod Sammut	x	x	x	x	x	x	SO	x	FB	FB	x	x	x	x	x	x	x	x	x	x	x	x	x	x	x	x	x	x	x	x
21	Max Jowitt	x	x	x	x	x	x	x	x	x	x	x	x	x	x	x	x	x	x	x	FB			x	x	x	x	x	x	FB	FB
22	Jordan Crowther	x	x	x	x	B	B	B	x	x	x	L	B	x	B						B									B	
23	Lopini Paea	L	B	B	B																										
24	Tom Johnstone	x	x	x	x	x	x	W	x	x	x	x	W	W	W	W	W	W	W		W		W							W	W
25	Ian Kirke	x	x	x	x	x	x	x	x	x	x	B	x	x	x	x	x	B	SR	SR											
26	Chris Annakin	B	x	x	x	x	x	x	x	x	x	x	x	x	B	x	B	P	B	B		L							B	L	L
27	Kyle Trout	x	x	x	x	x	x	x	B	x	B	x	x	x	x	x	x	x	x	x	x	x	x	x	x	x	x	x	x	x	x
28	Joe Arundel	x	x	x	x	x	C	C	C	C	C		C	C			C	C	C	C	C	C	C	C	C	C	C	B		C	C
29	George Griffin	x	x	x	x	x	P	P	P	P	P	x	x	x	x	x	x	x	x	x	x	x	x	x	x	x	x	x	x	x	x
30	Jordan Hand	x	x	x	x	x	x	B	x	B	x	x	x	x	x	x	x	x	x	x	x	x	x	x	x	x	x	x	x	x	x
31	Ben Kavanagh	x	x	x	x	x	x	x	x	x	x	P	P	P			P	B	B	B	P	P									B
32	Stuart Howarth	x	x	x	x	x	x	x	x	x	x	x	x	x	x	x	H	H			H		H								
33	Kevin Locke	x	x	x	x	x	x	x	x	x	x	x	x	x	x	x	x	x	x	FB		FB	FB					FB	FB		
34	Jordan Tansey	x	x	x	x	x	x	x	x	x	x	x	x	x	x	x	x	x	x	W	SO	W	W		x			W	W	W	
35	Michael Sio	x	x	x	x	x	x	x	x	x	x	x	x	x	x	x	x	x	x	B	L	B		H	B	H	H		H	H	H
36	Anthony Walker	x	x	x	x	x	x	x	x	x	x	x	x	x	x	x	x	x	x	x	P	B	B	B	B	B		P		P	
37	Anthony Mullally	x	x	x	x	x	x	x	x	x	x	x	x	x	x	x	x	x	x	x	x	x	B	B	B	B	B	B	P	B	
38	Lee Smith	x	x	x	x	x	x	x	x	x	x	x	x	x	x	x	x	x	x	x	x	x	x	FB	FB	FB	FB	W	W	x	x
39	Bill Tupou	x	x	x	x	x	x	x	x	x	x	x	x	x	x	x	x	x	x	x	x	x	x	C	C	C	C	C	C	C	C
40	Scott Moore	x	x	x	x	x	x	x	x	x	x	x	x	x	x	x	x	x	x	x	x	x	x	B	H						
41	Andy Yates	x	x	x	x	x	x	x	x	x	x	x	x	x	x	x	x	x	x	x	x	x	x	x	x	x	x	x	x	B	B
42	Simon Grix	x	x	x	x	x	x	x	x	x	x	x	x	x	x	x	x	x	x	x	x	x	x	x	x	x	x	x	x	x	x

= Injured
= Suspended

=== Player appearances: Cup ===
- Challenge Cup Games only

FB=Fullback	C=Centre	W=Winger	SO=Stand Off	SH=Scrum half	P=Prop	H=Hooker	SR=Second Row	L=Loose forward	B=Bench

No	Player	5	6
1	Craig Hall	FB	FB
2	Chris Riley	W	W
3	Dean Collis		C
4	Reece Lyne		
5	Richard Owen	W	W
6	Jacob Miller	SO	SO
7	Tim Smith	SH	SH
8	Nick Scruton	P	P
9	Paul McShane	H	H
10	Scott Anderson		SR
11	Ali Lauitiiti	SR	B
12	Danny Kirmond	SR	SR
13	Danny Washbrook	L	L
14	Pita Godinet		
15	Matt Ryan	C	
16	Michael Simon	P	B
17	Matty Ashurst	x	x
18	Daniel Smith	B	
19	Jon Molloy	B	B
20	Jarrod Sammut	x	x
21	Max Jowitt	x	x
22	Jordan Crowther	x	x
23	Lopini Paea		B
24	Tom Johnston	x	x
25	Ian Kirke	B	x
26	Chris Annakin	x	x
27	Kyle Trout	B	x
28	Joe Arundel	C	C
29	George Griffin	x	x
30	Jordan Hand	x	x
31	Ben Kavanagh	x	P

=== 2015 squad statistics ===
- Appearances and points include (Super League, Challenge Cup and Play-offs) as of 3 October 2015.

No	Player	Position	Age	Previous club	Apps	Tries	Goals	DG	Points
1	Craig Hall	Fullback	N/A	Hull Kingston Rovers	17	4	41	0	98
2	Chris Riley	Wing	N/A	Warrington Wolves	24	10	0	0	40
3	Dean Collis	Centre	N/A	Cronulla Sharks	11	2	0	0	8
4	Reece Lyne	Centre	N/A	Hull F.C.	23	6	0	0	24
5	Richard Owen	Wing	N/A	Sydney Roosters	20	5	0	0	20
6	Jacob Miller	Stand-off	N/A	Hull F.C.	30	15	17	0	94
7	Tim Smith	Scrum-half	N/A	Salford Red Devils	24	1	0	0	4
8	Nick Scruton	Prop	N/A	Bradford Bulls	31	3	0	0	12
9	Paul McShane	Hooker	N/A	Leeds Rhinos	24	3	0	0	12
10	Scott Anderson	Prop	N/A	Brisbane Broncos	16	1	0	0	4
11	Ali Lauitiiti	Second-row	N/A	Leeds Rhinos	21	1	0	0	4
12	Danny Kirmond	Second-row	N/A	Huddersfield Giants	19	7	0	0	28
13	Danny Washbrook	Loose forward	N/A	Hull F.C.	32	4	0	0	16
14	Pita Godinet	Scrum-half	N/A	New Zealand Warriors	22	4	2	0	20
15	Matt Ryan	Second-row	N/A	Parramatta Eels	20	2	0	0	8
16	Mickaël Simon	Prop	N/A	Catalans Dragons	26	2	0	0	8
17	Matty Ashurst	Second-row	N/A	Salford Red Devils	11	5	0	0	20
18	Daniel Smith	Loose forward	N/A	Wakefield Trinity Wildcats Academy	18	4	0	0	16
19	Jon Molloy	Second-row	N/A	Wakefield Trinity Wildcats Academy	13	2	0	0	8
20	Jarrod Sammut	Scrum-half	N/A	Bradford Bulls	3	1	0	0	4
21	Max Jowitt	Fullback	N/A	Wakefield Trinity Wildcats Academy	3	1	0	0	4
22	Jordan Crowther	Prop	N/A	Wakefield Trinity Wildcats Academy	8	1	0	0	4
23	Lopini Paea	Prop	N/A	Catalans Dragons	5	0	0	0	0
24	Tom Johnstone	Wing	N/A	Wakefield Trinity Wildcats Academy	13	9	0	0	36
25	Ian Kirke	Prop	N/A	Leeds Rhinos	5	3	0	0	12
26	Chris Annakin	Second-row	N/A	Wakefield Trinity Wildcats Academy	11	0	0	0	0
27	Kyle Trout	Prop	N/A	Wakefield Trinity Wildcats Academy	3	0	0	0	0
28	Joe Arundel	Centre	N/A	Hull F.C. (On Loan)	24	4	12	0	40
29	George Griffin	Prop	N/A	Salford Red Devils (On Loan)	5	0	0	0	0
30	Jordan Hand	Prop	N/A	Salford Red Devils (On Loan)	2	0	0	0	0
31	Ben Kavanagh	Prop	N/A	Widnes Vikings (On Loan)	11	1	0	0	4
32	Stuart Howarth	Hooker	N/A	Salford Red Devils	4	0	0	0	0
33	Kevin Locke	Fullback	N/A	Salford Red Devils	5	2	0	0	8
34	Jordan Tansey	Fullback	N/A	Salford Red Devils	8	1	3	0	10
35	Michael Sio	Prop	N/A	Salford Red Devils	11	3	0	0	12
36	Anthony Walker	Prop	N/A	St Helens R.F.C.	8	1	0	0	4
37	Anthony Mullally	Prop	N/A	Huddersfield Giants	10	2	0	0	8
38	Lee Smith	Fullback	N/A	Newcastle Falcons	6	6	15	1	55
39	Bill Tupou	Centre	N/A	Canberra Raiders	9	0	0	0	0
40	Scott Moore	Hooker	N/A	Castleford Tigers	3	1	0	0	4
41	Andy Yeates	Prop	N/A	Leeds Rhinos	3	0	0	0	0
42	Simon Grix	Second-row	N/A	Warrington Wolves	0	0	0	0	0

= Injured
= Suspended

=== 2015 transfers in/out ===
In

Nat	Name	Moved From	Length	Date
(England)	Craig Hall	Hull Kingston Rovers	2 Years	July 2014
(France)	Michael Simon	Catalans Dragons	2 Years	July 2014
(England)	Matty Ashurst	Salford Red Devils	2 Years	August 2014
(Tonga)	Lopini Paea	Catalans Dragons	1 Year	August 2014
(England)	Chris Riley	Warrington Wolves	1 Year	September 2014
(Australia)	Tim Smith	Salford Red Devils	1 Year	October 2014
(England)	Richard Owen	Castleford Tigers	3 Years	October 2014
(England)	Ian Kirke	Leeds Rhinos	1 Year	November 2014
(Australia)	Jacob Miller	Hull F.C.	1 Year	November 2014

Out

Nat	Name	Moved From	Length	Date
(Samoa)	Taulima Tautai	Wigan Warriors	3 Years	May 2014
(England)	Andy Raleigh	Retired	N/A	July 2014
(England)	Richard Mathers	London Broncos	2 Years	August 2014
(England)	Matty Wildie	Dewsbury Rams	1 Year	August 2014
(England)	Lucas Walshaw	Bradford Bulls	2 Years	September 2014
(Australia)	Harry Siejka	Bradford Bulls	2 Years	September 2014
(England)	Paul Sykes	Featherstone Rovers	2 Years	October 2014
(England)	Richard Moore	Halifax	2 Years	October 2014
(England)	Peter Fox			
