= 2022 Wakefield Trinity season =

Wakefield Trinity season

- Super League rank: 10
- Challenge Cup: Quarter-finals
- 2022 record: Wins: 11; draws: 0; losses: 18
- Points scored: For: 519; against: 696

Team information
- Chairman: Michael Carter
- Head Coach: Willie Poching
- Captain: Jacob Miller
- Stadium: Belle Vue; Wakefield, West Yorkshire
- Avg. attendance: 4,552
- Agg. attendance: 59,991
- High attendance: 7,046
- Low attendance: 3,221

Top scorers
- Tries: Lewis Murphy (19)
- Goals: Mason Lino (47)
- Points: Mason Lino (102)
← 2021	List of seasons	2023 →

The 2022 Wakefield Trinity season is the 24th consecutive season in the Super League and their 127th season at the Belle Vue. Wakefield were coached by Willie Poching and they competed in both Super League XXVII and the 2022 Challenge Cup.

== Season review ==
Wakefield's season got off to a poor start when they lost their first pre-season friendly 34–6 to Leeds Rhinos and were subsequently fined for a breach of operational rules regarding the RFL Covid-19 policy. On 13 February, Wakefield began their Super League campaign with a 16–12 loss to Hull F.C. which was followed by a 24–22 loss at Catalans Dragons. Wakefield suffered two more losses before gaining their first win of the season, an 18–12 victory over Toulouse Olympique. Then came two successful visits to Warrington Wolves for wins in the league and Challenge Cup and a victory over Salford Red Devils that moved Wakefield up to seventh in the table. Their winning run ended with a loss to Wigan Warriors in the quarter-finals of the Challenge Cup with their next win not coming until early June against Hull F.C. by which time Wakefield had slipped to 11th in the table.

At the Magic Weekend, a 38–26 loss to Toulouse left Wakefield only two points from the bottom of the table, and a 15–10 loss to Hull Kingston Rovers in the next round saw Wakefield drop below Toulouse on points difference. However, by the end of the month they had moved back out of the relegation spot with a 32–6 victory over Castleford Tigers, and began moving clear of danger from mid-August with a 30–12 win over Wigan. Wakefield came close to finishing off the season with a fifth consecutive win, but lost 14–16 to Huddersfield Giants in extra time.

== Results ==
=== Pre-season friendlies ===
W Win L Loss

Pre-season results
Date	Versus	H/A	Venue	Result	Score	Tries	Goals	Attendance	Report
26 December 2021	Leeds Rhinos	A	Headingley	L	6–34	Murphy	Walker	9,798	
16 January	Halifax Panthers	A	The Shay	W	52–24				(Note: Scott Grix Testimonial)
23 January	Featherstone Rovers	A	Post Office Road	L	18–22	Johnstone, Hall, Batchelor	Jowitt (3)		

=== Super League ===
==== Table ====
Pos	Team	Pld	W	D	L	PF	PA	PD	Pts	Qualification
1	St Helens (C, L)	27	21	0	6	674	374	+300	42	Advance to semi-finals
2	Wigan Warriors	27	19	0	8	818	483	+335	38	Advance to semi-finals
3	Huddersfield Giants	27	17	1	9	613	497	+116	35	Advance to elimination finals
4	Catalans Dragons	27	16	0	11	539	513	+26	32	Advance to elimination finals
5	Leeds Rhinos	27	14	1	12	577	528	+49	29	Advance to elimination finals
6	Salford Red Devils	27	14	0	13	700	602	+98	28	Advance to elimination finals
7	Castleford Tigers	27	13	0	14	544	620	−76	26	
8	Hull Kingston Rovers	27	12	0	15	498	608	−110	24	
9	Hull FC	27	11	0	16	508	675	−167	22	
10	Wakefield Trinity	27	10	0	17	497	648	−151	20	
11	Warrington Wolves	27	9	0	18	568	664	−96	18	
12	Toulouse Olympique (R)	27	5	0	22	421	745	−324	10	Relegated to the Championship

(C) Champions; (L) League Leaders' Shield winners; (R) Relegated

==== Super League results ====
W Win D Draw L Loss

Super League results
Date	Round	Versus	H/A	Venue	Result	Score	Tries	Goals	Attendance	Report
13 February	1	Hull FC	H	Be Well Support Stadium	L	12–16	Hall, Johnstone	Jowitt (2)	6,148	RLP
19 February	2	Catalans Dragons	A	Stade Gilbert Brutus	L	22–24	Johnstone (2), Jowitt, Lineham	Jowitt (3)	7,623	RLP
25 February	3	St Helens	A	Totally Wicked Stadium	L	4–20	Johnstone		10,361	RLP
3 March	4	Leeds Rhinos	H	Be Well Support Stadium	L	18–34	Ashurst, Johnstone, Jowitt	Jowitt (3)	5,040	RLP
11 March	5	Toulouse Olympique	H	Be Well Support Stadium	W	18–6	Hall, Hood, Tanginoa	Walker (3)	4,351	RLP
19 March	6	Warrington Wolves	A	Halliwell Jones Stadium	W	38–22	Ashurst, Crowther, Escaré, Hall, Hood, Lino	Lino (7)	8,164	RLP
3 April	7	Salford Red Devils	H	Be Well Support Stadium	W	30–24	Johnstone (2), Lyne, Miller, Pitts	Jowitt (5)	4,371	RLP
14 April	8	Castleford Tigers	H	Be Well Support Stadium	L	4–34	Kay		5,557	RLP
18 April	9	Wigan Warriors	A	DW Stadium	L	10–54	Miller, Minns	Lino	11,621	RLP
23 April	10	Hull Kingston Rovers	A	Sewell Group Craven Park	L	10–32	Miller, Murphy	Lino	7,058	RLP
28 April	11	Huddersfield Giants	H	Be Well Support Stadium	L	12–14	Lino, Murphy	Lino (2)	3,166	RLP
15 May	12	Toulouse Olympique	A	Stade Ernest Wallon	L	14–20	Hall, Kay, Murphy	Lino	3,909	RLP
20 May	13	Leeds Rhinos	A	Headingley	L	6–24	Whitbread	Lino	14,190	RLP
5 June	14	Hull FC	H	Be Well Support Stadium	W	19–18	Ashurst, Gaskell, Hall	Lino (3), Miller (FG)	4,426	RLP
12 June	15	Warrington Wolves	H	Be Well Support Stadium	W	30–24	Batchelor (2), Ashurst, Hood, Tanginoa	Lino (5)	3,891	RLP
26 June	16	Salford Red Devils	A	AJ Bell Stadium	L	10–74	Batchelor, Murphy	Lino	4,047	RLP
3 July	17	Wigan Warriors	H	Be Well Support Stadium	L	22–46	Jowitt (2), Evans, Pitts	Lino (3)	7,046	RLP
9 July	18	Toulouse Olympique	N	St James' Park	L	26–38	Ashurst, Fifita, Hood, Tanginoa	Jowitt (5)	36,821	RLP
17 July	19	Hull Kingston Rovers	A	Sewell Group Craven Park	L	10–15	Jowitt, Murphy	Lino	7,029	RLP
24 July	20	St Helens	H	Be Well Support Stadium	L	12–13	Croft, Taufua	Lino (2)	4,162	RLP
29 July	21	Castleford Tigers	A	Mend-A-Hose Jungle	W	32–6	Murphy (2), Ashurst, Fifita, Hood	Lino (6)	6,796	RLP
7 August	22	Catalans Dragons	H	Be Well Support Stadium	L	16–20	Ashurst, Murphy, Shaul	Lino (2)	3,227	RLP
14 August	23	Wigan Warriors	H	Be Well Support Stadium	W	30–12	Kershaw, Miller, Murphy, Tanginoa, Whitbread	Lino (5)	3,933	RLP
19 August	24	Hull FC	A	MKM Stadium	W	26–18	Murphy, Hood, Kershaw	Lino (3)	9,165	RLP
25 August	25	Hull Kingston Rovers	H	Be Well Support Stadium	W	18–6	Jowitt, Kershaw, Murphy	Jowitt (2), Fifita	4,653	RLP
29 August	26	St Helens	A	Totally Wicked Stadium	W	34–18	Murphy (4), Gaskell, Hall, Jowitt	Gaskell (2), Jowitt	8,222	RLP
2 September	27	Huddersfield Giants	A	John Smiths Stadium	L	14–16	Ashurst, Aydin, Tanginoa	Lino	5,524	RLP

=== Challenge Cup ===
W Win L Loss

Challenge Cup results
Date	Round	Versus	H/A	Venue	Result	Score	Tries	Goals	Attendance	Report
27 March	6	Warrington Wolves	A	Halliwell Jones Stadium	W	16–12	Hall, Lyne, Murphy	Lino (2)	2,627	RLP
9 April	Quarter-final	Wigan Warriors	H	Be Well Support Stadium	L	6–36	Murphy	Jowitt	3,756	RLP

== Squad ==
Wakefield Trinity announced their squad numbers for the 2022 season on 24 November 2021.

2022 Wakefield Trinity Squad
First team squad				Coaching staff
1 Max Jowitt (gk) – FB; 2 Tom Johnstone – WG; 3 Bill Tupou – CE, WG; 4 Reece Lyne – CE; 5 Tom Lineham – WG; 6 Jacob Miller (c) – SO, SH; 7 Mason Lino (gk) – SH, SO; 8 Eddie Battye – PR; 9 Liam Hood – HK; 10 Tinirau Arona – PR; 11 Matty Ashurst – SR; 12 Kelepi Tanginoa – PR, SR; 13 Jay Pitts – SR, CE	14 Jordan Crowther – LF; 15 Jai Whitbread – PR; 16 James Batchelor – LF, CE; 17 Lee Gaskell – FB, SO; 18 Lee Kershaw – WG; 19 Liam Kay – WG, HK; 20 Jack Croft – CE, WG; 21 Brad Walker – SO, HK; 22 Yusuf Aydin – PR; 23 Sadiq Adebiyi – SR; 24 Harry Bowes – HK, SH; 25 Sam Eseh – PR; 26 Pat O'Donovan – LF	27 Lewis Murphy – WG; 28 Dane Windrow – SR; 29 Isaac Shaw – PR; 30 Corey Hall – CE; 35 David Fifita – PR	31 Thomas Minns – CE, WG; 33 Morgan Escaré – FB; 34 Rob Butler – PR; Josh Bowden – PR; Jack Croft – CE, SR; Kyle Evans – WG; Lee Kershaw – WG; Jorge Taufua – WG, CE	Head coach: Willie Poching; Assistant coach: Stuart Dickens; Legend: (c) Captain(s); (vc) Vice-captain(s); Updated: Source(s):
