= Jacob Miller (rugby league) =

Australian professional rugby league footballer

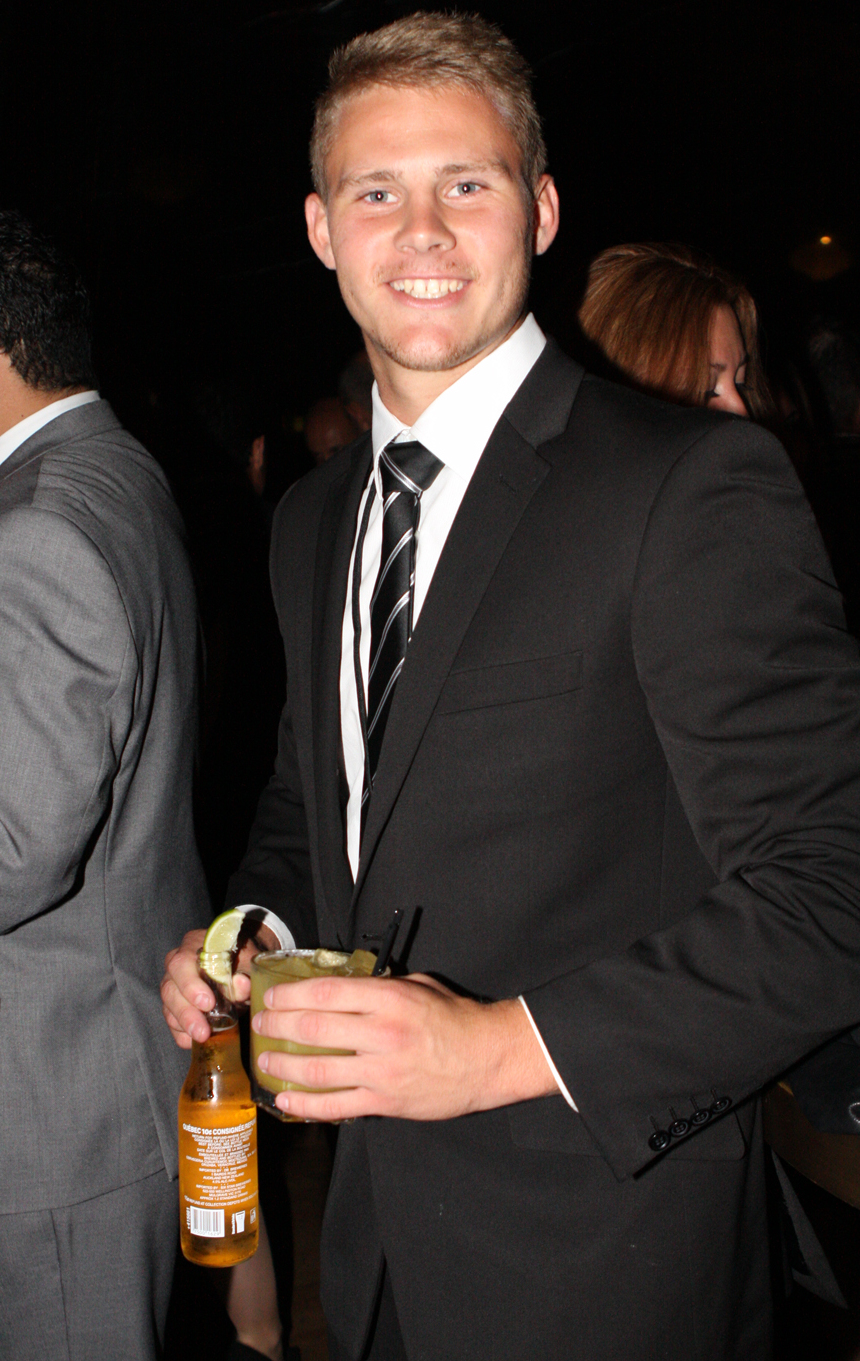

Personal information
- Full name: Jacob Miller
- Born: 22 August 1992 (age 34) Sydney, New South Wales, Australia
- Height: 6 ft 0 in (1.82 m)
- Weight: 13 st 3 lb (84 kg)

Playing information
- Position: Stand-off, Scrum-half
Club
Years	Team	Pld	T	G	FG	P
2011–13	Wests Tigers	9	2	1	1	11
2013–14	Hull F.C.	24	6	9	0	42
2014(loan)	→ Doncaster	5	2	0	0	8
2015–22	Wakefield Trinity	200	62	17	10	292
2023–24	Castleford Tigers	52	6	0	1	25
	Total	290	78	27	12	378
Representative
Years	Team	Pld	T	G	FG	P
2022	Combined Nations All Stars	1	0	0	0	0
- Source: As of 19 September 2024

Jacob Miller (born 22 August 1992) is an Australian professional rugby league footballer who plays as a stand-off or scrum-half for the Mullumbimby Giants in the Northern Rivers Regional Rugby League in New South Wales.

He previously played for the Wests Tigers in the NRL, and for Hull F.C. and Wakefield Trinity in the Super League. He has also spent time on loan at Doncaster in the Championship. He has played at representative level for the Combined Nations All Stars.

== Background ==
Miller was born in Sydney, New South Wales, Australia.

Hailing from Ocean Shores, Miller played junior football with Mullumbimby Giants, winning a premiership with the Giants in the under 18s competition in 2007. He was a pupil at Mullumbimby High School before he moved to Sydney and was a pupil at Matraville Sports High School when he was chosen as halfback for the Australian Schoolboys in 2009.

On a scholarship with the Sydney Roosters from age 14 onwards, Miller was released from the club as they had Todd Carney, Braith Anasta and Mitchell Pearce able to fill positions in the halves.

== Playing career ==
=== Wests Tigers ===
Miller made his début with the Wests Tigers in round 4 of the 2011 NRL season, playing from the bench, and getting on the field with 20 minutes to go. He was only 18 at the time, and coach Tim Sheens said, "If you're good enough, you're old enough. And I think he's good enough." Two weeks later he made his first appearance in the run-on squad, playing as halfback in a match against the Gold Coast Titans, standing in for injured Robert Lui.

Besides NRL appearances, Miller played in the Wests Tigers' Toyota Cup team. He scored 5 tries and 128 points for the season, and was named as halfback in the competition's Team of the Year.

In round 4 of the 2012 season, Miller, after a late call up, scored his first NRL try. However, it was to be his only first grade appearance for the year. He finished the year by playing a "starring role" as Wests Tigers won the Under-20s grand final 46–6 against the Canberra Raiders. He then kicked six goals as he played five-eighth in the Junior Kangaroos squad that beat New Zealand 48–16.

Beginning the 2013 season as the Wests Tigers first choice of halfback, Miller started in the first 4 games of the season before being dropped to reserve grade for Braith Anasta.

=== Hull F.C. ===
Weeks later it was announced Miller had been released and signed for Hull F.C. on a 2 1/2-year deal.

It was announced Miller would leave the club at the end of the 2014 season.

=== Wakefield Trinity ===
He was subsequently signed by Wakefield Trinity for the 2015 season. Miller played 200 matches for Wakefield Trinity over a seven-year period.

=== Castleford Tigers ===
In October 2022, Miller signed for the Castleford Tigers, joining on a three-year deal from local rivals Wakefield. He made his Castleford debut in round 1 against Hull FC, scoring a try and being voted Fans Man of the Match. He scored a try and a drop goal against Hull KR on 21 April, and a further try against the Leeds Rhinos at the Magic Weekend on 3 June. However, he also topped the league for missed tackles and registered only 1 try assist throughout the year. He made a total of 26 appearances for Castleford in the 2023 season, as the Tigers narrowly avoided relegation by finishing above his previous club Wakefield.

Miller's strong performance in 2024 pre-season was highlighted by new head coach Craig Lingard. In round 3, he was voted Fans Man of the Match against Warrington. He scored his first try of the year against the Batley Bulldogs in the Challenge Cup on 23 March. In July, he provided four try assists in a Man of the Match performance against London. Towards the end of the season, Miller was occasionally rested as Lingard experimented with different halfback combinations, and he was linked with a move away from the club. On 7 October, it was announced that he would depart Castleford alongside eight teammates after being released from the final year of his contract.

== Club statistics ==
Appearances and points in all competitions by year
Club	Season	Tier	App	T	G	DG	Pts
Wests Tigers	2011	NRL	4	0	1	0	2
Wests Tigers	2012	NRL	1	1	0	0	4
Wests Tigers	2013	NRL	4	1	0	1	5
Wests Tigers	Total		9	2	1	1	11
Hull F.C.	2013	Super League	14	3	0	0	12
Hull F.C.	2014	Super League	10	3	9	0	30
Hull F.C.	Total		24	6	9	0	42
→ Doncaster (loan)	2014	Championship	5	2	0	0	8
Wakefield Trinity	2015	Super League	30	15	17	0	94
Wakefield Trinity	2016	Super League	32	10	0	1	41
Wakefield Trinity	2017	Super League	22	10	0	1	41
Wakefield Trinity	2018	Super League	31	6	0	2	26
Wakefield Trinity	2019	Super League	25	10	0	1	41
Wakefield Trinity	2020	Super League	15	2	0	2	10
Wakefield Trinity	2021	Super League	21	5	0	2	22
Wakefield Trinity	2022	Super League	24	4	0	1	17
Wakefield Trinity	Total		200	62	17	10	292
Castleford Tigers	2023	Super League	26	3	0	1	13
Castleford Tigers	2024	Super League	26	3	0	0	12
Castleford Tigers	Total		52	6	0	1	25
Career total			290	78	27	12	378

As of match played 19 September 2024
