= Scott Anderson (rugby league) =

Australian rugby league footballer (born 1986)

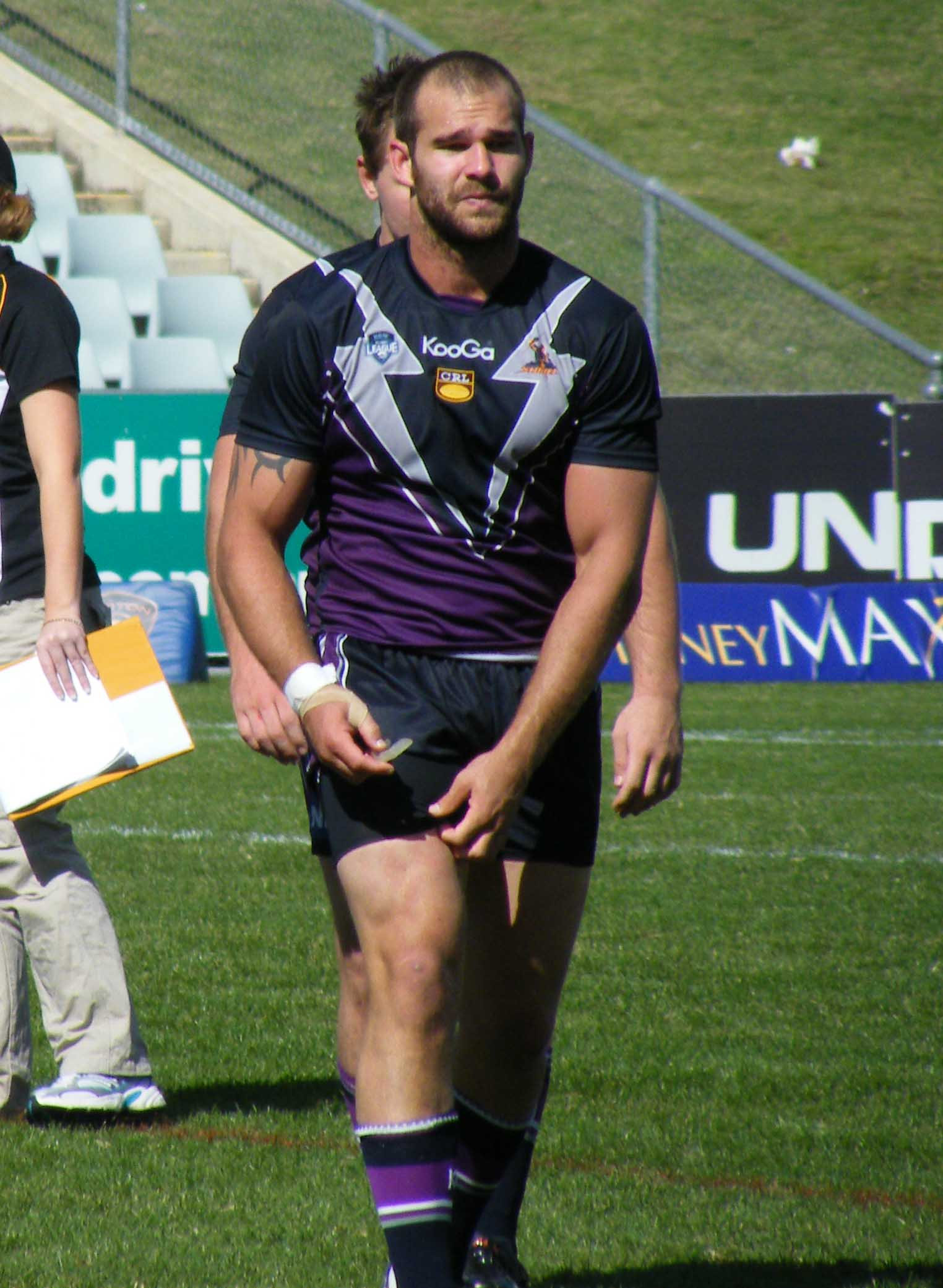
- Anderson playing for the Melbourne Storm in 2009

Personal information
- Full name: Scott Anderson
- Born: 8 January 1986 (age 40) Nambour, Queensland, Australia
- Height: 189 cm (6 ft 2 in)
- Weight: 102 kg (16 st 1 lb)

Playing information
- Position: Prop
Club
Years	Team	Pld	T	G	FG	P
2007–09	Melbourne Storm	28	0	0	0	0
2010–13	Brisbane Broncos	51	0	0	0	0
2014–16	Wakefield Trinity Wildcats	53	2	0	0	8
	Total	132	2	0	0	8
Representative
Years	Team	Pld	T	G	FG	P
2006	Queensland Residents	1	0	0	0	0
- Source: As of 4 January 2024

Scott Anderson (born 8 January 1986) is an Australian former professional rugby league footballer who played in the 2000 and 2010s. He played for the Wakefield Trinity Wildcats of the Super League. A prop, he previously played for the Melbourne Storm. He also played for the Brisbane Broncos.

== Playing career ==
=== Melbourne Storm ===
Anderson played from the interchange bench in Melbourne's 2008 NRL Grand Final loss to Manly. The following season he played in the 2009 NRL Grand Final victory over the Parramatta Eels, again from the bench. This premiership was later stripped in 2010 due to the club's multiple and deliberate breaches of the salary cap.

=== Brisbane Broncos ===
On 12 November 2009 it was announced he had signed with the Brisbane Broncos on a two-year deal.

=== Wakefield Trinity Wildcats ===
Anderson signed with the Wildcats in 2013, joining the club for the 2014 season, originally on a one-year contract.

He retired from rugby league at the end of the 2016 season.

== Statistics ==
Season	Team	Pld	T	G	FG	P
2007	Melbourne Storm	2	0	0	0	0
2008	Melbourne Storm	8	0	0	0	0
2009	Melbourne Storm	18	0	0	0	0
2010	Brisbane Broncos	17	0	0	0	0
2011	Brisbane Broncos	19	0	0	0	0
2012	Brisbane Broncos	4	0	0	0	0
2013	Brisbane Broncos	11	0	0	0	0
2014	Wakefield Trinity	21	1	0	0	4
2015	Wakefield Trinity	16	1	0	0	4
2016	Wakefield Trinity	16	0	0	0	0
	Totals:	132	2	0	0	8
