= Judah Mazive =

Zimbabwean rugby league footballer (born 1998)

Personal information
- Full name: Judah Mazive
- Born: 1 February 1998 (age 28) Bulawayo, Zimbabwe
- Height: 5 ft 7 in (171 cm)
- Weight: 14 st 0 lb (89 kg)

Playing information
- Position: Wing
Club
Years	Team	Pld	T	G	FG	P
2016–17	Wakefield Trinity Wildcats	2	1	0	0	4
2017(loan)	→ Oxford	2	0	0	0	0
2018–19	York City Knights	17	7	0	0	28
	Total	21	8	0	0	32
- Source: As of 25 March 2026

Judah Mazive (born 1 February 1998) is a Zimbabwean professional rugby league footballer who played as a winger for the York City Knights in the Championship.

He previously played for the Wakefield Trinity Wildcats in the Super League.

== Background ==
Mazive was born in Bulawayo, Zimbabwe.

== Career ==
Mazive made his professional début for the Wakefield Trinity Wildcats in a Super 8s fixture on August 14, 2016, scoring a try in a defeat by the Warrington Wolves.

In November 2017 Mazive joined York for the 2018 season.
