= Ben Shulver =

English rugby league footballer

Personal information
- Full name: Ben Shulver
- Born: Leeds, West Yorkshire, England

Playing information
- Position: Prop, Second-row
Club
Years	Team	Pld	T	G	FG	P
2013–14	Wakefield Trinity Wildcats	1	1	0	0	4
2015	Queanbeyan Kangaroos	?	?	?	?	?
2016	Wakefield Trinity Wildcats	0	0	0	0	0
	Total
- Source: As of 16 June 2026

Ben Shulver, is an English professional rugby league footballer who has played in the 2010s for the Wakefield Trinity Wildcats in the Super League, Queanbeyan Kangaroos and Hunslet Club Parkside, as a prop or second-row.

== Career ==
Shulver started his career with the Wakefield Trinity Wildcats, playing and scoring in one Challenge Cup match against Hemel Stags on 20 April 2013. During his first spell with the club, Ben failed to make his début in Super League.

During the 2015 season, Shulver played in Australia for Queanbeyan Kangaroos.

On 25 Feb 2024 he played at Loose forward for Hunslet ARLFC in their Challenge Cup defeat to Wakefield Trinity.
