= Frazer Morris =

English rugby league footballer

Personal information
- Full name: Frazer Morris
- Born: 22 February 1997 (age 28); England
- Height: 5 ft 11 in (1.81 m)
- Weight: 15 st 2 lb (96 kg)

Playing information
- Position: Prop
Club
| Years | Team | Pld | T | G | FG | P |
|---|---|---|---|---|---|---|
| 2016–17 | Wakefield Trinity (Wildcats) | 1 | 0 | 0 | 0 | 0 |
| 2017(loan) | → Halifax | 1 | 0 | 0 | 0 | 0 |
| 2018–19 | Halifax | 0 | 0 | 0 | 0 | 0 |
| 2018(loan) | → Newcastle Thunder | 2 | 1 | 0 | 0 | 4 |
| 2019(loan) | → Oldham | 2 | 0 | 0 | 0 | 0 |
| 2019–21 | Dewsbury Rams | 10 | 3 | 0 | 0 | 12 |
| 2021 | Hunslet | 6 | 0 | 0 | 0 | 0 |
| | Total | 22 | 4 | 0 | 0 | 16 |
- Source: As of 22 Jun 2022

Frazer Morris (born 22 February 1997) is a former English professional rugby league footballer who last played as a prop for the Hunslet RLFC in League 1.

Morris played for Wakefield Trinity in the Super League.

Whilst at Halifax in 2019 he spent a loan spell at Oldham.

Morris joined Hunslet during the 2021 season. A back injury sustained while working in the building trade prevented Morris from playing in the 2022 season.
