= Harry Bowes =

English rugby league footballer

Personal information
- Full name: Harry George Bowes
- Born: 7 September 2001 (age 24) Wakefield, England
- Height: 5 ft 11 in (1.80 m)

Playing information
- Position: Hooker, Loose forward
Club
Years	Team	Pld	T	G	FG	P
2020–23	Wakefield Trinity	31	0	0	0	0
2021 (loan)	→Newcastle Thunder	1	0	0	0	0
2024	Featherstone Rovers	26	1	0	0	4
2025	Keighley Cougars	9	1	0	0	4
2025 (loan)	→ Sheffield Eagles	6	0	0	0	0
2026–	Sheffield Eagles	0	0	0	0	0
	Total	73	2	0	0	8
- Source: As of 11 October 2025

Harry Bowes (born 7 September 2001) is a professional rugby league footballer who plays as a hooker or loose forward for Sheffield Eagles in the RFL Championship.

== Playing career ==
=== Junior Career ===
Bowes played his amateur rugby league for the Shaw Cross Sharks. He joined Wakefield Trinity at 15 years old, joining the scholarship side.

=== 2020 ===
Bowes made his Super League debut for Wakefield Trinity against the Leeds Rhinos in round 11 of the 2020 Super League season.

=== 2021 ===
He featured once for Wakefield Trinity in the 2021 season, He joined Newcastle Thunder on a short-term loan, featuring in one game for the RFL League One side.

=== 2022 ===
In 2022 he played 11 games for Wakefield Trinity in the Super League XXVII season, finished 3rd from bottom.

=== 2023 ===
Bowes played 13 games for Wakefield Trinity in the Super League XXVIII season as the club finished bottom of the table and were relegated to the RFL Championship which ended their 24-year stay in the top flight.

On 8 November 2023, it was reported that he had signed for Featherstone Rovers in the RFL Championship.

=== 2024 ===
His debut for Featherstone Rovers came against Hunslet in first round of the 1895 Cup, coming off the bench in the 12-62 win. He went on to feature another 25 times, scoring a singular try. Featherstone Rovers finished 6th in the table, qualifiers for the eliminators. Bowes did not feature in the 25-12 loss against Bradford Bulls.

On 19 Oct 2024 it was reported that he had signed for Keighley Cougars in the RFL League 1 on a 1-year deal.

=== 2025 ===
His debut for Keighley Cougars came in the second round of the 2025 Challenge Cup, starting at hooker in the 12-72 loss against RFL Championship side York Knights.

Starting at hooker against Dewsbury Rams, Bowes got over for a try early on in the second half, but soon after, was left on the floor following a nasty collision. Reports from local paper, the Telegraph & Argus, suggested that Bowes had suffered a seizure following that collision, with him eventually leaving the field following a lengthy period of treatment from both sides’ medical staff.

On 8 August 2025 it was reported that he had signed for Sheffield Eagles in the RFL Championship on loan until the end of the 2025 season

On 11 October 2025 it was reported that he had made his move to Sheffield Eagles permanent.
