= Joe Arundel =

English professional rugby league footballer

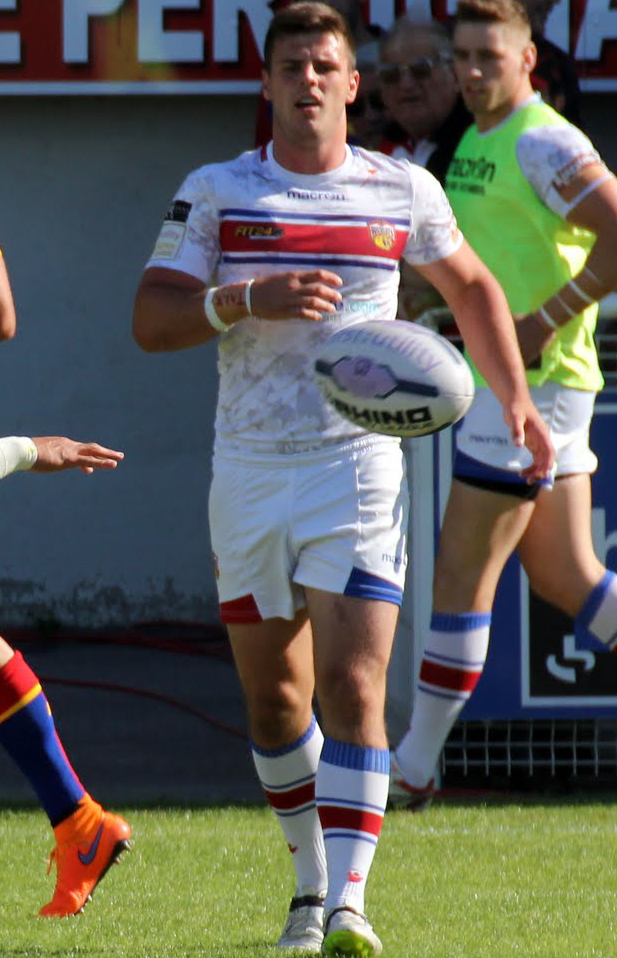

Personal information
- Full name: Joseph Arundel
- Born: 22 August 1991 (age 35) Leeds, West Yorkshire, England
- Height: 6 ft 2 in (1.88 m)
- Weight: 14 st 11 lb (94 kg)

Playing information
- Position: Centre, Second-row
Club
Years	Team	Pld	T	G	FG	P
2008–12	Castleford Tigers	44	16	2	0	68
2009(loan)	→ Gateshead Thunder	4	4	0	0	16
2013–15	Hull FC	18	9	1	0	38
2013(loan)	→ York City Knights	3	2	0	0	8
2014(loan)	→ Doncaster	4	1	0	0	4
2014(loan)	→ Bradford Bulls	12	5	0	0	20
2015(DR)	→ Featherstone Rovers	1	1	0	0	4
2015(loan)	→ Wakefield Trinity Wildcats	24	4	12	0	40
2016–21	Wakefield Trinity	89	20	0	0	80
2018(loan)	→ Dewsbury Rams	1	0	0	0	0
2019(loan)	→ Newcastle Thunder	1	1	0	0	4
2022	Halifax Panthers	22	11	0	0	44
2023–24	Bradford Bulls	38	10	0	0	40
2025	Batley Bulldogs	12	3	0	0	12
	Total	273	87	15	0	378
Representative
Years	Team	Pld	T	G	FG	P
2011	England Knights	2	0	0	0	0
- Source: As of 31 August 2026

Joe Arundel (born 22 August 1991) is an English professional rugby league footballer who last played as a centre or second-row forward for Batley Bulldogs in the RFL Championship and the England Knights at the International level.

He has played for the Castleford Tigers in the Super League, spending time as a loan from Castleford at Gateshead Thunder in the Co-operative Championship. Arundel moved to Hull F.C. in the top flight, and spent time away from Hull at the York City Knights, Doncaster and Featherstone Rovers in the Championship, and at the Bradford Bulls and the Wakefield Trinity Wildcats in the Super League. A permanent move to Wakefield followed, with loan moves away at the Dewsbury Rams in the 2018 RFL Championship and the Newcastle Thunder in League 1.

== Background ==
Arundel was born in Leeds, West Yorkshire, England.

== Career ==
His amateur club was Castleford Panthers and he has played professionally for the Castleford Tigers, Gateshead Thunder (loan), Hull FC, the York City Knights (loan), Doncaster (loan), the Bradford Bulls (loan), and the Wakefield Trinity (Wildcats) (two spells, the first one on loan) in the Super League.

=== Castleford Tigers ===
Arundel made his debut for the Castleford Tigers in the Super League game against Huddersfield Giants in 2008 Aged 16.

Arundel played in nine games for Castleford in 2010 and impressed scoring 2 tries. He was handed the number 4 jersey for the 2011 season.

=== Bradford Bulls ===
On 25 April 2014, Arundel signed for the Bradford Bulls for the rest of the season on loan along with Hull FC teammate Jay Pitts.

A goal kicking Centre, Arundel is considered skilled in defence and has a high work rate

=== Halifax Panthers ===
On 5 November 2021, it was reported that he had signed a part-time playing contract with Halifax Panthers in the RFL Championship

=== Bradford Bulls ===
On 1 January 2023, Arundel signed a contract to re-join one of his former clubs Bradford for the 2023 season.

=== Batley Bulldogs ===
On 24 October 2024, it was reported that he had signed for Batley in the RFL Championship

On 20 November 2025 it was confirmed that he was one of 6 players to leave Batley Bulldogs
