= Chris Riley (rugby league) =

English footballer (born 1988)

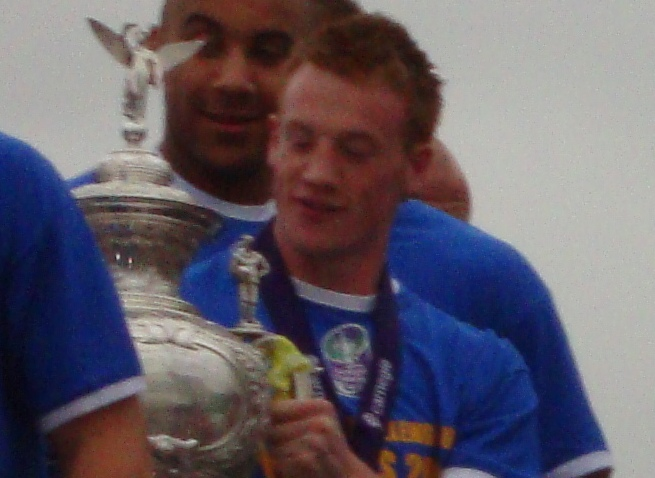

Personal information
- Full name: Christopher James Riley
- Born: 22 February 1988 (age 38) Warrington, Cheshire, England

Playing information
- Height: 5 ft 8 in (172 cm)
- Weight: 12 st 11 lb (81 kg)
- Position: Wing, Fullback
Club
Years	Team	Pld	T	G	FG	P
2005–14	Warrington Wolves	180	120	0	0	480
2011(loan)	→ Harlequins RL	3	2	0	0	8
2014(loan)	→ Swinton Lions	1	0	0	0	0
2014(loan)	→ Wakefield Trinity Wildcats	22	7	0	0	28
2014–15	Wakefield Trinity Wildcats	25	11	0	0	44
2016–17	Rochdale Hornets	42	19	0	0	76
	Total	273	159	0	0	636
Representative
Years	Team	Pld	T	G	FG	P
2012	England Knights	3	0	0	0	0

Chris Riley (born 22 February 1988) is an English former professional rugby league footballer who played in the 2000s and 2010s. He played at representative level for the England Knights, and at club level for Woolston Rovers ARLFC, Warrington Wolves, Harlequins RL (loan), Swinton Lions (loan), Wakefield Trinity Wildcats (two spells, including initially on loan) and the Rochdale Hornets, as a fullback or winger.

== Background ==
Chris Riley was born in Longford, Cheshire, England.

He was a pupil at Penketh High School, Warrington.

== Playing career ==
Riley had a fine strike rate at Super League level, Riley was primarily a fullback with England Academy and the Warrington junior grades, but he forged his first team career on the wing. A well balanced and elusive runner who added some strength to his build since débuting in late 2005 at the age of 17. A graduate of Woolston Rovers ARLFC and the Warrington Scholarship Scheme, he won Junior Academy titles in 2003 and 2004, represented England U17 against the Australian Institute of Sport in 2005 and made a try scoring début for England Academy the same season. Riley attended Penketh High School in Warrington where he won the Warrington Schools Rugby League Final in years 7, 8, 9 and 10.

On 7 February 2010, he was in his sixth season of rugby during 2010's Super League XV.

Riley played for Warrington in three winning Challenge Cup Finals of 2009, 2010 and 2012 where he scored his first try in a Cup Final for his hometown club.

Riley played in the 2010 Challenge Cup Final victory over the Leeds Rhinos at Wembley Stadium.

Riley joined Harlequins RL in May 2011 after agreeing an initial one-month loan deal, he made his début on the right wing against Castleford Tigers in a disappointing 56-24 loss, in which he scored two tries.

Riley later returned to Warrington and made the trip to Australia with the team for their pre-season games and will be included in a squad to play Russell Crowe's South Sydney Rabbitohs at Redfern Oval on Saturday, 28 January 2012.

Riley played in the 2012 Challenge Cup Final victory over the Leeds Rhinos at Wembley Stadium.

Riley played in the 2012 Super League Grand Final defeat by the Leeds Rhinos at Old Trafford.

Riley played in the 2013 Super League Grand Final defeat by the Wigan Warriors at Old Trafford.

In 2014, Riley signed to play for the Wakefield Trinity Wildcats on loan for one month, during April it was confirmed that he would stay for at least another month after his loan was extended.
