= Chris Annakin =

English rugby league footballer

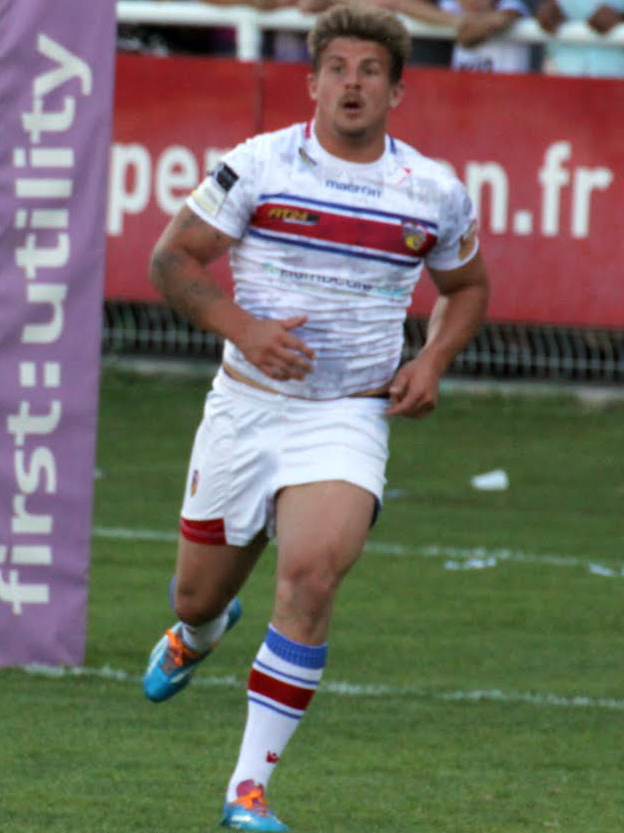

Personal information
- Full name: Christopher Annakin
- Born: 30 January 1991 (age 35) Dewsbury, West Yorkshire, England

Playing information
- Position: Second-row
Club
Years	Team	Pld	T	G	FG	P
2011–19	Wakefield Trinity	77	1	0	0	4
2011(loan)	→ Workington Town	7	1	0	0	4
2014(loan)	→ Featherstone Rovers	11	3	0	0	12
2015(loan)	→ London Broncos	2	0	0	0	0
2017(loan)	→ Dewsbury Rams	3	0	0	0	0
2018(loan)	→ Dewsbury Rams	2	0	0	0	0
2019(loan)	→ Dewsbury Rams	12	1	0	0	4
2020–22	Dewsbury Rams	0	0	0	0	0
	Total	114	6	0	0	24
- Source: As of 17 October 2019

Chris Annakin (born 30 January 1991) is a former English professional rugby league player who played as a second-row forward.

He has played for Wakefield Trinity in the Super League, and spent time on loan from Wakefield at Workington Town in Championship 1, and Featherstone Rovers, London Broncos and the Dewsbury Rams in the Championship.

== Background ==
Annakin was born in Dewsbury, West Yorkshire, England.

== Career ==
He appears for the club sporadically, enduring somewhat of a nightmare 2014 season, as in his 3rd appearance of the season, he was banned for 5 matches for a dangerous throw.
