= Pita Godinet =

Samoa international rugby league footballer

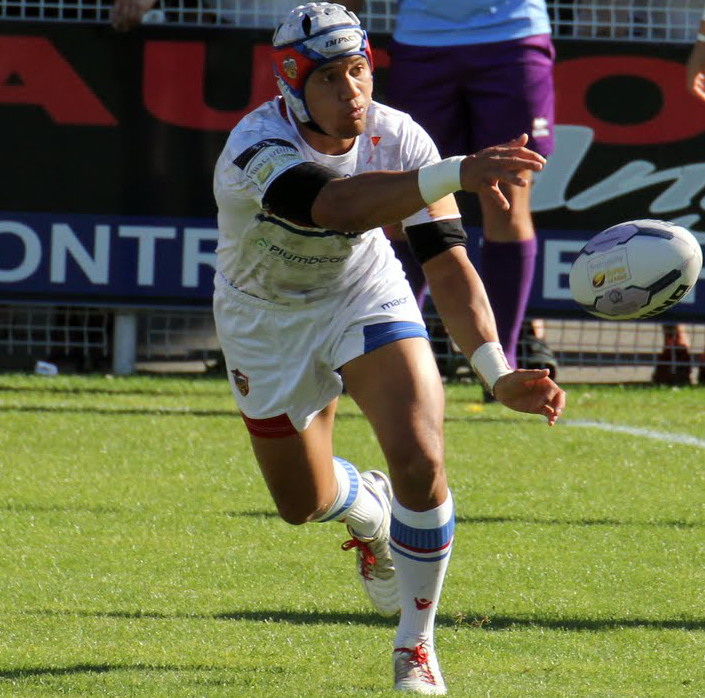

Personal information
- Born: 21 December 1987 (age 38) Christchurch, New Zealand
- Height: 170 cm (5 ft 7 in)
- Weight: 78 kg (12 st 4 lb)

Playing information
- Position: Hooker, Halfback, Five-eighth
Club
Years	Team	Pld	T	G	FG	P
2011–13	New Zealand Warriors	18	4	0	0	16
2014–15	Wakefield Trinity Wildcats	41	14	3	0	62
2016	Manly Sea Eagles	2	1	1	0	6
2018	Wests Tigers	9	0	0	0	0
2019–21	Villeneuve	14	3	5	0	22
2021–22	Atlanta Rhinos	0	0	0	0	0
	Total	84	22	9	0	106
Representative
Years	Team	Pld	T	G	FG	P
2010–17	Samoa	15	5	0	0	20
- Source: As of 17 January 2023

Pita Godinet (born 21 December 1987) is a Samoa international rugby league footballer who plays as a hooker for the Dapto Canaries in the Illawarra Rugby League.

== Background ==
Godinet was born in Christchurch, New Zealand.

== Early years ==
Godinet is a Sydenham and Richmond Rovers junior.

== Playing career ==
Godinet played for the Waitakere Rangers in the 2007 Bartercard Cup.

In 2008 he represented Auckland in the Bartercard Premiership, and played for the Auckland Vulcans in the NSW Cup. He was named the Vulcans rookie of the year.

=== Te Atatu Roosters ===
In 2010 Godinet signed with the Te Atatu Roosters in the Auckland Rugby League competition. In 2010 he represented Auckland in the Albert Baskerville Trophy, and played for the Auckland Vulcans in the NSW Cup. He was selected at halfback in the NSW Cup team of the year.

=== New Zealand Warriors ===
In October 2010 Godinet was signed by the New Zealand Warriors to take part in their 2010-2011 pre-season training. This was updated to a full-time contract in February 2011. He was also part of the Manurewa Marlins in 2011. He has re-signed with the Warriors until the end of 2013.

Godinet was named to make his National Rugby League début on 24 July 2011, replacing an injured Lance Hohaia. Godinet had a "dream debut", scoring a try in his first match.

=== Manly Sea Eagles ===
During the 2016 pre-season, Godinet trialled with the Manly Warringah Sea Eagles, and was subsequently signed to a one-year contract.

Godinet featured for the Manly Sea Eagles in the 2017 NRL Auckland Nines, and signed for the Wests Tigers in December 2017.

=== Atlanta Rhinos ===
On 11 May 2021 it was reported that he had signed for the Atlanta Rhinos in the North American Rugby League

== Representative career ==
Godinet made his début for Samoa on 16 October 2010, being called into the side to replace the injured Ben Roberts at halfback. Godinet scored the only try for Samoa.

In 2013, Godinet was selected to play for the Samoans in their 2013 Rugby League World Cup campaign. He appeared in all four of the Samoans' games in the Tournament. He scored one try against the French in the group stage.

On 7 October 2014, Godinet was selected in the Samoa national rugby league team 24-man squad for the 2014 Four Nations series.

In 2016 Godinet played for Amerika Samoa in the Cabramatta International Nines tournament. On 7 May 2016, Godinet returned to playing for Samoa, playing in the 2016 Polynesian Cup against Tonga where he played as the halfback in the 18–6 win at Parramatta Stadium. Later in the year, he was also part of the Samoan team that took on Fiji in a historical test match in Apia.
