= Kyle Trout =

English rugby league footballer & coach (born 1991)

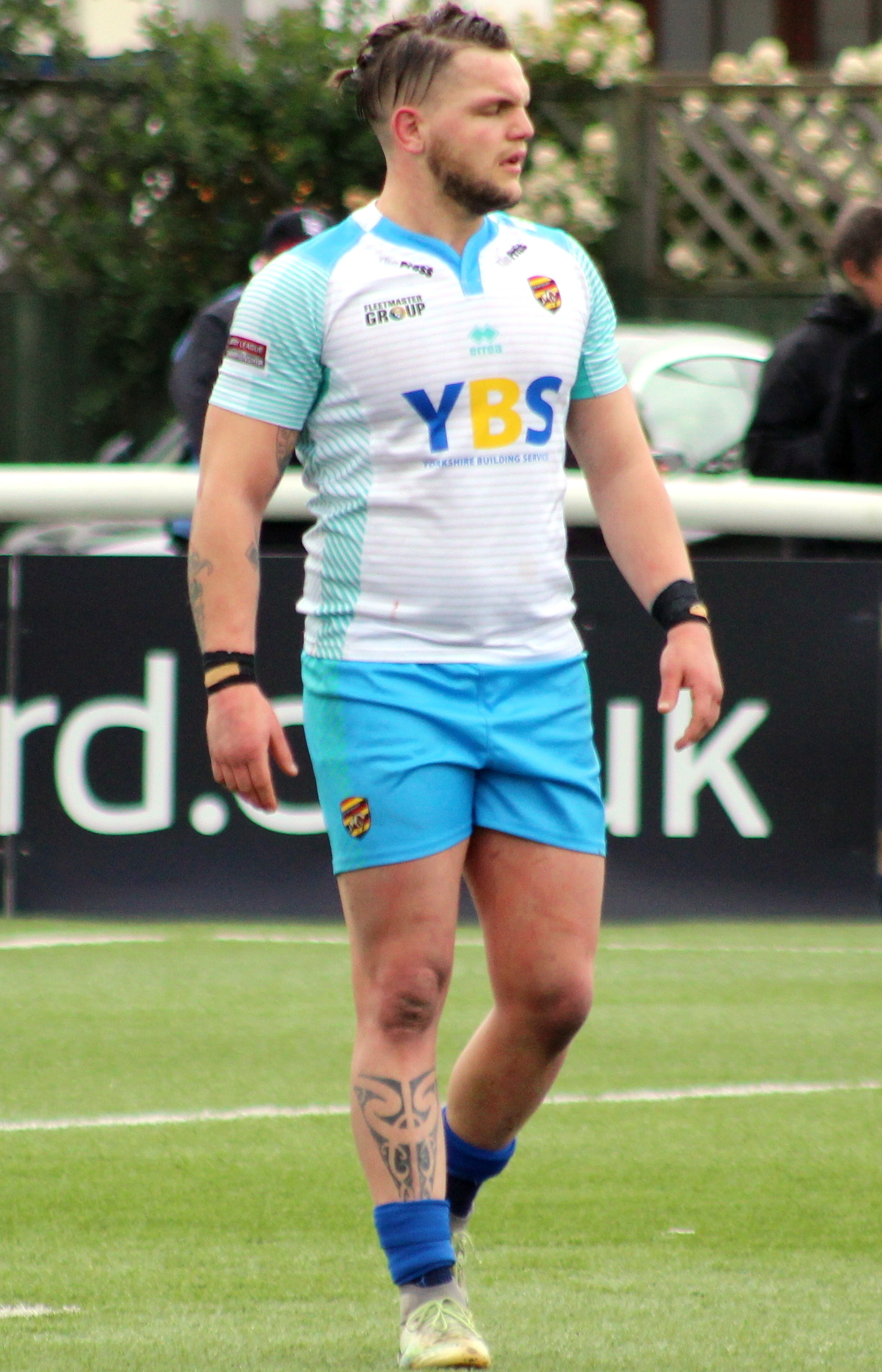

Personal information
- Full name: Kyle Liam Trout
- Born: 1 March 1991 (age 35) Wakefield, West Yorkshire, England
- Height: 6 ft 1 in (1.85 m)
- Weight: 15 st 10 lb (100 kg)

Playing information
- Position: Prop, Loose forward
Club
Years	Team	Pld	T	G	FG	P
2012–15	Wakefield Trinity Wildcats	25	4	0	0	16
2013(loan)	→ Doncaster	16	4	0	0	16
2014(loan)	→ Batley Bulldogs	4	0	0	0	0
2014(DR)	→ Featherstone Rovers	15	3	0	0	12
2015(loan)	→ Whitehaven	2	0	0	0	0
2015(DR)	Featherstone Rovers	1	0	0	0	0
2015(loan)	→ Hunslet Hawks	16	2	0	0	8
2016	Dewsbury Rams	7	2	0	0	8
2017	Sheffield Eagles	30	3	0	0	12
2018–19	Dewsbury Rams	51	8	0	0	32
2019–20	Hull Kingston Rovers	16	0	0	0	0
2021–22	Limoux Grizzlies	9	5	0	0	0
2021(loan)	→ Newcastle Thunder	11	6	0	0	0
2022	Featherstone Rovers	4	0	0	0	0
2022(loan)	→ Dewsbury Rams	5	0	0	0	0
2022–23	Keighley Cougars	15	2	0	0	8
	Total	227	39	0	0	112

Coaching information
Club
Years	Team	Gms	W	D	L	W%
2025–	Hunslet	35	9	0	26	26
- Source: As of 3 November 2026
- Relatives: Owen Trout (brother)

Kyle Trout (born 1 March 1991) is a professional rugby league coach who is the head coach of Hunslet in the Betfred Championship and a former professional rugby league footballer who played as a prop, loose forward.

He played for the Wakefield Trinity Wildcats in the Super League, playing on loan from the Wildcats at Doncaster, Batley Bulldogs, Featherstone Rovers, Whitehaven and the Hunslet Hawks in the Championship. He has also played for the Sheffield Eagles and the Dewsbury Rams in the Championship, and Hull Kingston Rovers in the Super League.

== Background ==
Trout was born in Wigan, Greater Manchester, England. He is the older brother of the rugby league footballer; Owen Trout.

He played as a youth for Stanley Rangers.

In February 2021 he revealed he has autism and panic attacks.

== Club career ==
On 5 August 2019, he signed a contract with Hull Kingston Rovers for the remainder of the season. Trout then went on to sign a further one-year contract with the Super League outfit, keeping him at the club until the end of the 2020 season.

=== Hull KR ===
Hull KR released Trout at the end of the 2020 season.

=== Limoux Grizzlies ===
On 7 January 2021, it was reported that he had signed for Limoux Grizzlies in the Elite One Championship.

=== Newcastle Thunder (loan) ===
On 10 June 2021, he signed for the Newcastle Thunder in the RFL Championship on loan.

=== Featherstone Rovers (Re-join) ===
On 1 December 2021, he signed for Featherstone in the RFL Championship.

=== Keighley Cougars ===
On 29 June 2022 he signed for Keighley Cougars in the RFL League 1.

== Coaching career ==
=== Hunslet RLFC ===
On 17 July 2025 he was appointed head-coach for Hunslet RLFC in the RFL Championship
