= Dean Collis =

Australian rugby league footballer

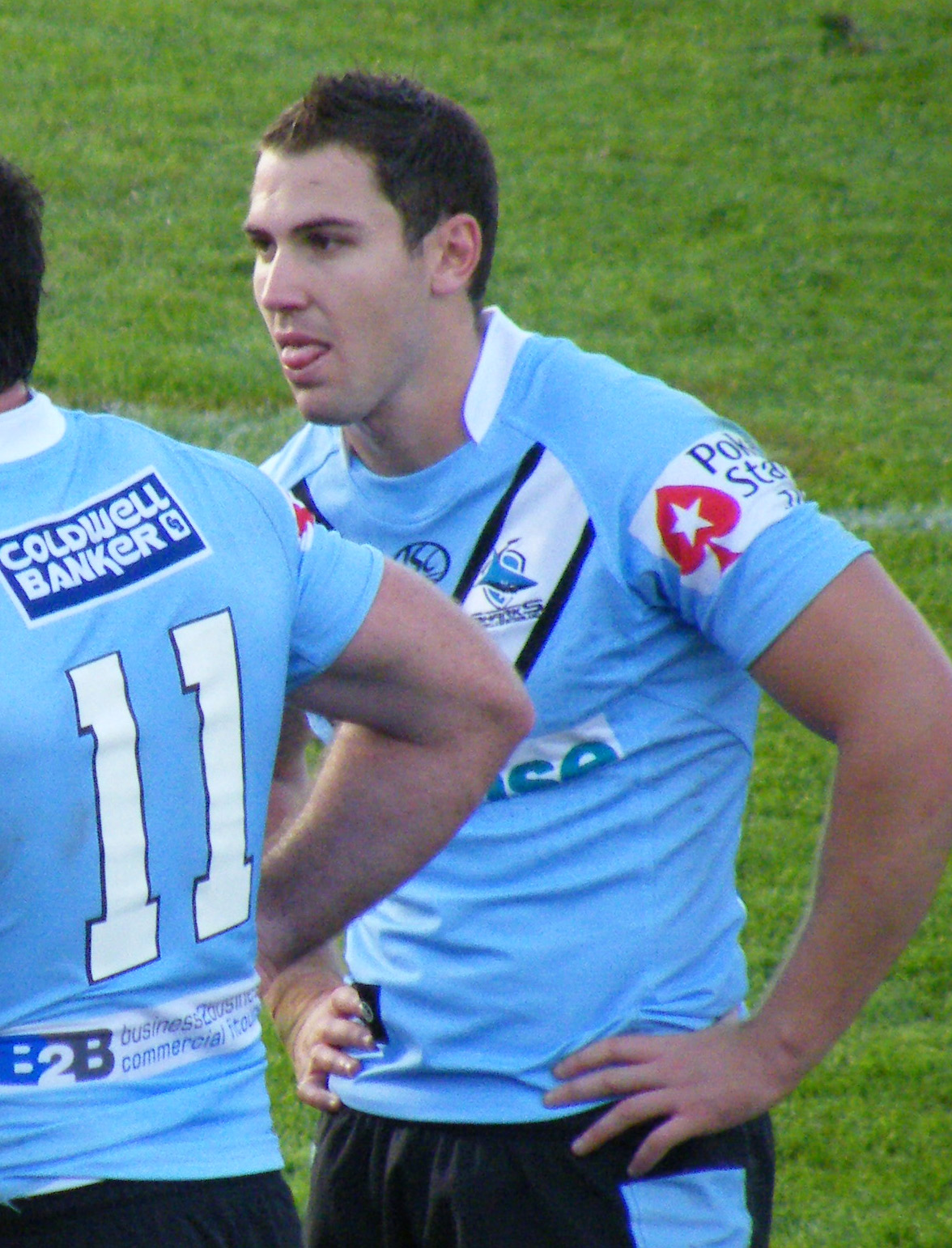

Personal information
- Full name: Dean James Collis
- Born: 21 October 1985 (age 41) Campbelltown, New South Wales, Australia

Playing information
- Height: 1.81 m (5 ft 11 in)
- Weight: 91 kg (14 st 5 lb)
- Position: Centre
Club
Years	Team	Pld	T	G	FG	P
2003–09	Wests Tigers	80	24	15	0	126
2010–11	Cronulla Sharks	24	7	0	0	28
2012–15	Wakefield Trinity	68	28	0	0	112
	Total	172	59	15	0	266
Representative
Years	Team	Pld	T	G	FG	P
2007	City Origin	1	0	0	0	0

Dean Collis (born 21 October 1985 in Campbelltown, New South Wales, Australia) is an Australian former professional rugby league footballer who last played for the Camden Rams in the Group 6 Rugby League Competition, primarily as a centre.

== Career ==
Collis played his junior football with the Campbelltown Warriors. While attending Patrician Brothers' College, Fairfield. Collis played for the Australian Schoolboys team in 2003.

Making his début with Wests Tigers in 2003, Collis played 8 games until the end of the 2005 season. As NRL Premiers Wests faced Super League champions Bradford Bulls in the 2006 World Club Challenge. Collis played at centre in the Tigers' 30–10 loss. By 2006, Collis was a regular starter in the centres, playing in every game of the 2006 and 2007 seasons, and winning a spot in the City team. His remaining 2 seasons with Wests Tigers were hampered by injury.

In July, 2009, it was announced that Collis had signed a two-year deal to play with the Cronulla-Sutherland Sharks from the 2010 NRL season.

In September 2011 Collis signed a deal that saw him join the Super League playing for Wakefield Trinity until 2015.

On 11 June 2015 it was announced that Collis would be leaving Wakefield Trinity with immediate effect as he had a desire to return home due to family reasons.

== Career highlights ==
- First Grade Debut: 2003, Round 25 – Wests Tigers v North Queensland Cowboys, Campbelltown Stadium, 31 August
- 50th First Grade game: Round 19, 22 July 2007, scoring a try in the seventh minute.
