= Danny Kirmond =

England international rugby league footballer

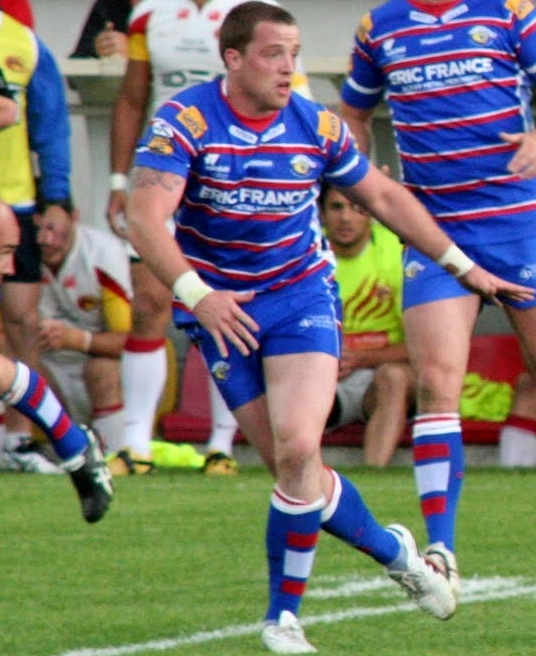

Personal information
- Full name: Daniel Kirmond
- Born: 11 November 1985 (age 40) Wakefield, West Yorkshire, England

Playing information
- Height: 6 ft 1 in (1.86 m)
- Weight: 16 st 1 lb (102 kg)
- Position: Second-row, Wing
Club
Years	Team	Pld	T	G	FG	P
2005–07	Featherstone Rovers	73	41	0	0	164
2008–11	Huddersfield Giants	55	10	0	0	40
2010(loan)	→ Wakefield Trinity Wildcats	17	2	0	0	8
2012–20	Wakefield Trinity	157	44	0	0	176
2021–23	York City Knights	64	13	0	0	52
	Total	366	110	0	0	440

Danny Kirmond (born 11 November 1985) is an English professional rugby league coach who is an assistant coach at Wakefield Trinity in the Super League, and a former professional rugby league footballer who last played as a second-row forward for the York City Knights in the Championship.

He has played at club level for Featherstone Rovers in the RFL Championship. Kirmond has also played for the Huddersfield Giants in the Super League, and on loan from Huddersfield at the Wakefield Trinity Wildcats in 2010. He started his career on the wing, before moving into the pack.

== Background ==
Kirmond was born in Sharlston, West Yorkshire, England.

== Playing career ==
=== Featherstone Rovers ===
Kirmond started his career at Featherstone Rovers in 2005 playing as a wing in the second-tier of British rugby league, the Championship. Unfortunately, Kirmonds début season saw the club relegated to the third tier of British rugby league. In 2007 Kirmond was the Featherstone Rovers' leading try scorer as they were promoted back to the Championship. Kirmond left the Featherstone Rovers at the end of 2007 after playing 73 times and scoring 41 tries in the three years he was at the club.

=== Huddersfield Giants ===
In 2008, Kirmond signed for Super League side the Huddersfield Giants, where he began the transition into the forward pack playing as a second-row. In 2009 he was part of the Huddersfield Giants team that got to the Challenge Cup Final but lost 25-16 to the Warrington Wolves. In 2010, Kirmond was loaned out to Super League rivals Wakefield Trinity where he made 17 appearances and scored twice. Kirmond returned to the Huddersfield Giants in 2011 but this would be his last season after playing 55 times for the Huddersfield Giants scoring 10 times.

=== Wakefield Trinity ===
In 2012, Kirmond signed for Wakefield Trinity after his successful loan spell two years earlier in 2010. Kirmond was named captain mid season in 2012. In 2015, Kirmond captain Trinity in the Million Pound Game against the Bradford Bulls, whom they beat to ensure their Super League status would be saved.

=== York City Knights ===
On 3 September 2020 it was announced that Kirmond would join York City Knights for the 2021 season In addition to playing for York, Kirmond took on a role as an assistant coach during the 2023 season.

On 30 Oct 2023 he announced his retirement from professional rugby league. Following his departure from York, Kirmond was appointed as the assistant coach at Wakefield.
