= Andy Yates =

English rugby league footballer

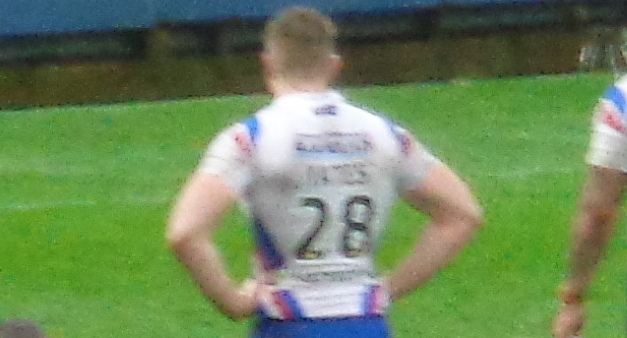

Personal information
- Full name: Andrew Yates
- Born: 23 February 1990 (age 35) St Helens, Merseyside, England
- Height: 6 ft 3 in (190 cm)
- Weight: 15 st 13 lb (101 kg)

Playing information
- Position: Prop
Club
| Years | Team | Pld | T | G | FG | P |
|---|---|---|---|---|---|---|
| 2007–12 | St. Helens | 0 | 0 | 0 | 0 | 0 |
| 2013–14 | Hunslet Hawks | 81 | 10 | 0 | 0 | 40 |
| 2015 | Leeds Rhinos | 10 | 1 | 0 | 0 | 4 |
| 2015–16 | Wakefield Trinity | 11 | 0 | 0 | 0 | 0 |
| | Total | 102 | 11 | 0 | 0 | 44 |
- Source: As of 20 September 2016

Andrew Yates is a professional rugby league player who last played for the Wakefield Trinity (Wildcats) in the Super League. His position of preference is prop.

Yates signed for St Helens as a junior from local amateur side Thatto Heath Crusaders, but his only senior appearances for the Saints came in pre-season friendlies. Yates joined Hunslet Hawks at the start of the 2011 season. In June 2013 he agreed to join Leeds Rhinos on a two-year deal from December 2013, but in November he picked up an injury that ruled him out for the season. Yates joined Wakefield during the 2015 season and made thirteen appearances for the club before retired from rugby league at the end of 2016.
