= Anthony Walker (rugby league) =

Wales international rugby league footballer

Ant Walker
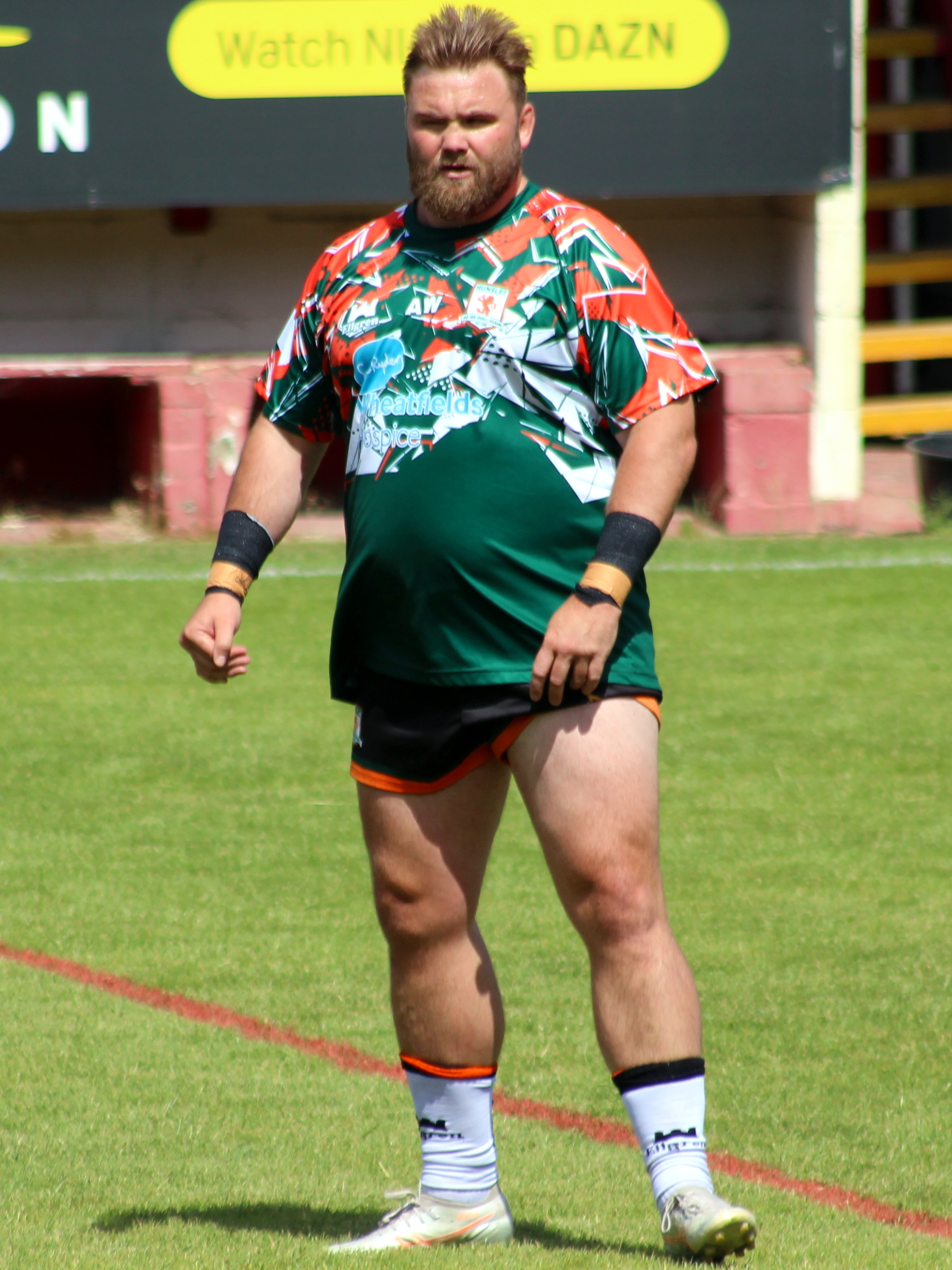

Personal information
- Full name: Anthony Walker
- Born: 28 December 1991 (age 34) St Helens, Merseyside, England
- Height: 6 ft 0 in (1.84 m)
- Weight: 19 st 10 lb (125 kg)

Playing information
- Position: Prop
Club
Years	Team	Pld	T	G	FG	P
2013–14	St Helens	17	2	0	0	8
2013(loan)	→ Whitehaven	5	2	0	0	8
2014(loan)	→ Rochdale Hornets	17	2	0	0	8
2014(loan)	→ Whitehaven	1	0	0	0	0
2014(loan)	→ Rochdale Hornets	5	1	0	0	4
2014–17	Wakefield Trinity	18	1	0	0	4
2016(loan)	→ Whitehaven	13	2	0	0	8
2017(loan)	→ Dewsbury Rams	3	0	0	0	0
2017(loan)	→ Rochdale Hornets	11	0	0	0	0
2021–22	Bradford Bulls	40	2	0	0	8
2023–24	Widnes Vikings	35	4	0	0	16
2024–25	Swinton Lions	14	2	0	0	8
2025–26	North Wales Crusaders	22	4	0	0	16
2026–	Hunslet RLFC	14	4	0	0	16
	Total	215	26	0	0	104
Representative
Years	Team	Pld	T	G	FG	P
2013–	Wales	13	4	0	0	16
- Source: As of 26 October 2026

Anthony Walker (born 28 December 1991) is a Wales international rugby league footballer who plays as a prop for Hunslet RLFC in the RFL Championship.

He previously played for Wakefield Trinity in the Super League. He made his professional début in 2013.

== Club career ==
=== Bradford Bulls (trial) ===
On 5 Mar 2021 it was reported that he had joined Bradford Bulls on a one-month trial, making his first team début in the 41–16 defeat to Featherstone Rovers in the 2021 Challenge Cup first round tie on Sun 21 Mar 2021.

=== Swinton Lions ===
On 27 June 2024 it was reported that he had signed for Swinton Lions in the RFL Championship

=== North Wales Crusaders ===
On 7 March 2025 it was reported that he had signed for North Wales Crusaders in the RFL League 1

=== Hunslet RLFC ===
On 23 April 2026 it was reported that he had signed for Hunslet RLFC in the RFL Championship.

== International ==
In October 2013, Walker represented Wales in the 2013 Rugby League World Cup. Walker made his international début against the United States in a match that also saw him score his first international try. Walker was back to playing in the Red Jersey of the Cymru in the 2015 European Cup tournament.

He scored a try in the opening game against Scotland.

In October 2016, Walker played in the 2017 World Cup qualifiers.

== Personal life ==
Walker was born with a potentially fatal brain condition, arteriovenous malformation (AVM), however was not diagnosed until 2017, forcing him to retire days before the 2017 Rugby League World Cup. Following treatment however, Walker was given the all-clear in April 2020 and was able to return to rugby.
