= Danny Washbrook =

English rugby league footballer

Daniel Washbrook
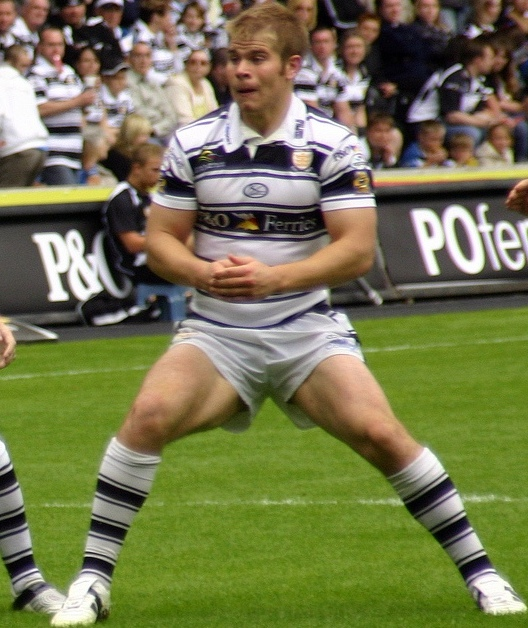

Personal information
- Full name: Daniel Washbrook
- Born: 18 September 1985 (age 40) Hull, Humberside, England

Playing information
- Height: 6 ft 0 in (1.83 m)
- Weight: 14 st 2 lb (90 kg)
- Position: Loose forward, Stand-off, Second-row, Hooker
Club
| Years | Team | Pld | T | G | FG | P |
|---|---|---|---|---|---|---|
| 2005–11 | Hull FC | 134 | 13 | 0 | 0 | 52 |
| 2012–15 | Wakefield Trinity Wildcats | 114 | 15 | 0 | 0 | 60 |
| 2016–19 | Hull FC | 95 | 8 | 0 | 0 | 32 |
| 2019(loan) | → Doncaster | 5 | 0 | 0 | 0 | 0 |
| 2020–21 | York City Knights | 20 | 2 | 0 | 0 | 8 |
| | Total | 368 | 38 | 0 | 0 | 152 |

Danny Washbrook (born 18 September 1985) is an English former rugby league footballer who played as a loose forward and second-row forward. He played as a stand-off earlier in his career.

He played for Hull F.C. in two separate spells and the Wakefield Trinity Wildcats in the Super League, and on loan from Hull FC at Doncaster in League 1. He finished his career at the York City Knights in the Championship.

== Background ==
Washbrook was born in Kingston upon Hull, Humberside, England. He played amateur rugby league for Skirlaugh before turning professional with his hometown club, Hull.

== Career ==
Washbrook made his debut for Hull in 2005 against St Helens. Hull reached the 2006 Super League Grand final to be contested against St. Helens, and Washbrook played at loose forward in his side's 4–26 loss.

In September 2011, he signed a three-year deal at Super League club Wakefield Trinity, following Hull Coach Richard Agar.

On 4 May 2014, Washbrook made his 200th career appearance. His current club, Wakefield Trinity, beat his former club, Hull, on his milestone.

On 13 August 2015 Hull re-signed Washbrook on a two-year deal, with coach Lee Radford saying he returns a better player than the last time he was at the club. Washbrook can play loose forward or cover Danny Houghton at hooker and cover in the centres despite not being a centre by trade.

He played in the 2016 Challenge Cup Final victory over the Warrington Wolves at Wembley Stadium.

He played in the 2017 Challenge Cup Final victory over the Wigan Warriors at Wembley Stadium.

In September 2019, Washbrook joined York City Knights. In September 2021, Washbrook announced that he would be retiring at the end of the season.
