= Matt Ryan (rugby league) =

Australian rugby league footballer

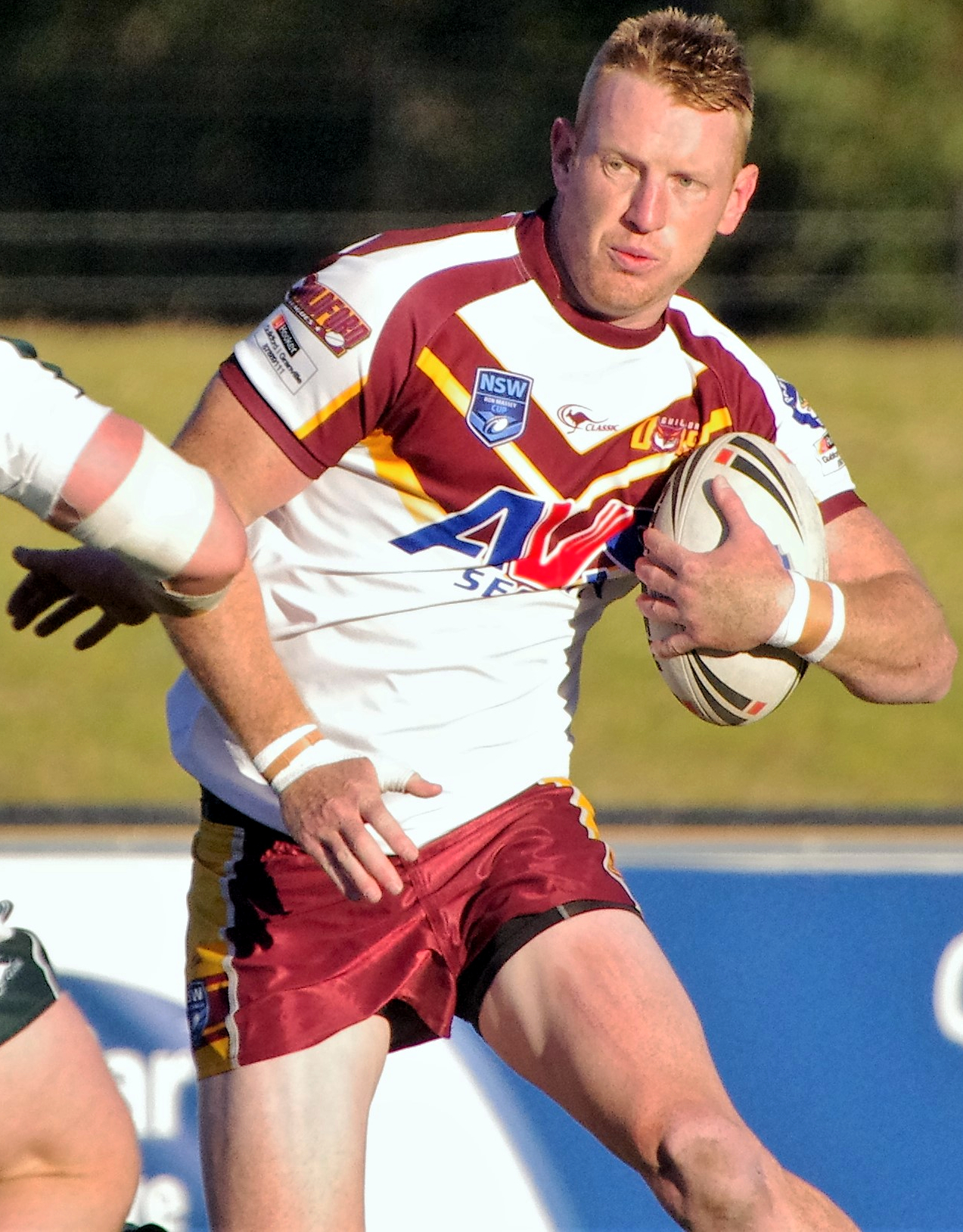

Personal information
- Full name: Matthew Ryan
- Born: 13 June 1988 (age 38) Sydney, New South Wales, Australia
- Height: 198 cm (6 ft 6 in)
- Weight: 107 kg (16 st 12 lb)

Playing information
- Position: Second-row, Lock, Centre, Prop
Club
Years	Team	Pld	T	G	FG	P
2012–13	Parramatta Eels	24	4	0	0	16
2014–15	Wakefield Trinity Wildcats	42	8	0	0	32
2015(loan)	→ Featherstone Rovers	1	1	0	0	4
2015	Bradford Bulls	5	1	0	0	4
	Total	72	14	0	0	56
Representative
Years	Team	Pld	T	G	FG	P
2012	Prime Minister's XIII	1	0	0	0	0
- Source: As of 26 September 2015

Matthew Ryan (born 13 June 1988) is an Australian former professional rugby league footballer who played as a second-row or centre for the Parramatta Eels in the NRL, Wakefield Trinity Wildcats in the Super League and the Bradford Bulls in the Kingstone Press Championship. Ryan spent time on loan from the Wakefield Trinity Wildcats at Featherstone Rovers in the Championship. Ryan currently plays for the Guildford Owls in the Ron Massey Cup.

== Early life ==
Ryan attended high school at Marist College Eastwood and graduated with the class of 2005. He was a North Ryde Hawks junior from the age of eight.

== Rugby league career ==
=== 2008-2010: Early playing career ===
Ryan played with the Wests Tigers in 2008 season of the National Youth Competition. After 2008, Ryan played for Balmain in New South Wales Cup for 2 seasons.

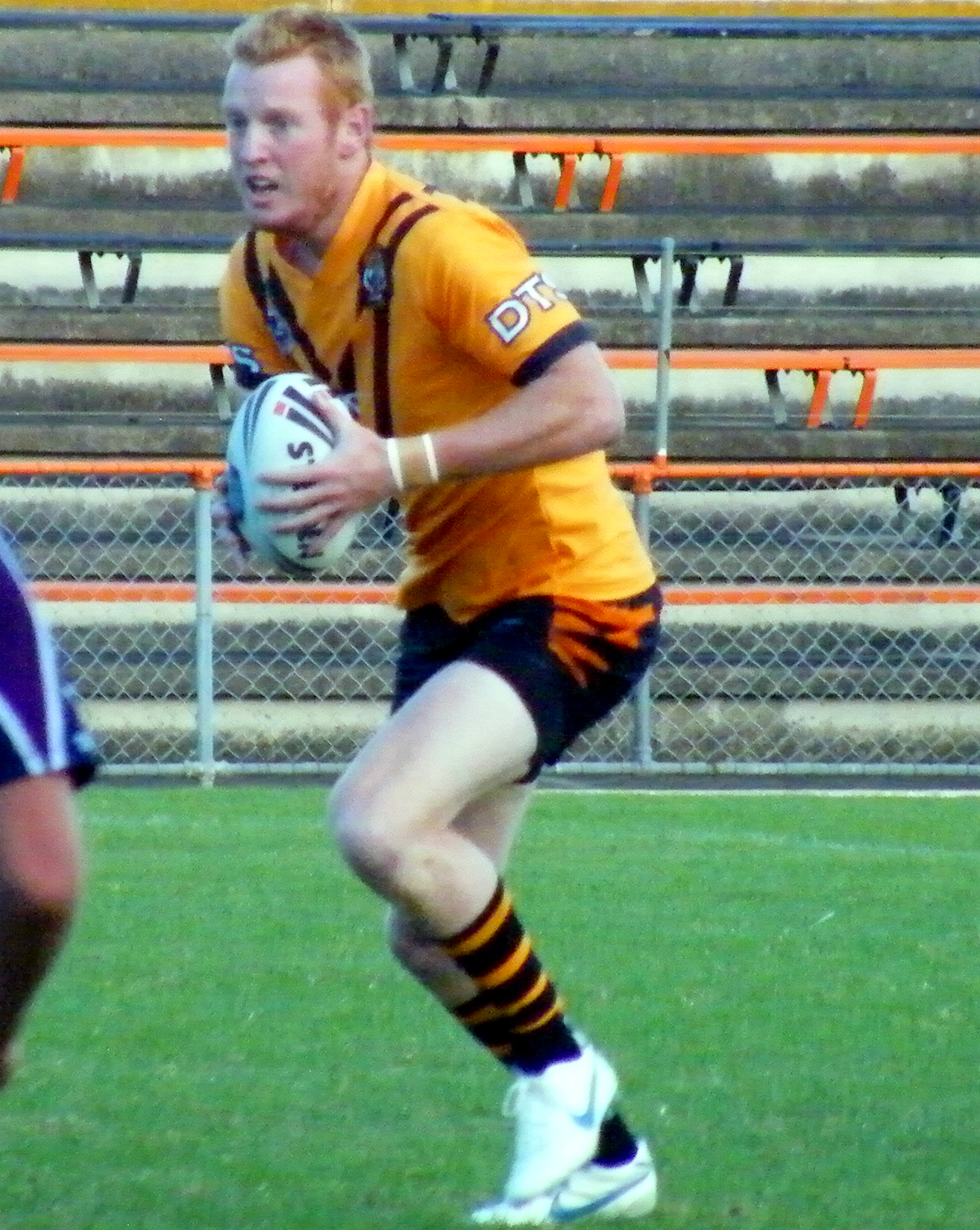
Ryan playing for the Balmain Tigers

=== 2011: Move to Parramatta ===
Ryan came to Parramatta midway through the 2011 NRL season, training with the first grade squad and playing in NSW Cup for feeder club Wentworthville. He said of the change of clubs, "Parramatta gave me an opportunity to go across there and be coached by Mooks. I couldn't say no. I always knew, in the back of my mind, that I was never really in the Tigers' plans. They had a good quality back row there. Nothing against the club, but I just had to go somewhere for a challenge, and change my attitude a bit."

=== 2012: First grade debut ===
Ryan made his NRL début in round 7 of the 2012 NRL season against the Cronulla-Sutherland Sharks. Ryan scored his first try in round 8 against the Wests Tigers in his second first grade appearance. Ryan made a total of 17 appearances in his first season at Parramatta as the club finished last on the table for the first time since 1972.

Ryan later re-signed with the Parramatta Eels for two years, until the end of the 2014 season.

=== 2013 ===
In June 2013, Ryan was one of 12 Parramatta players that were told that their futures at the club were uncertain by coach, Ricky Stuart. Ryan made a total of 7 appearances for Parramatta in the 2013 NRL season as the club finished last for a second consecutive year.

=== 2014 ===
In 2014, Ryan travelled up to the Northern Hemisphere to play for Super League club, the Wakefield Trinity Wildcats.

=== Bradford Bulls ===
Ryan joined the Bradford Bulls for the rest of the 2015 season.

2015 – 2015

Ryan played in Qualifier 1 (Sheffield Eagles) to Qualifier 2 (Wakefield Trinity Wildcats) then in Qualifier 5 (Hull Kingston Rovers) to Qualifier 7 (Halifax). He scored against Halifax (1 try).

Statistics do not include pre-season friendlies.

Season	Appearance	Tries	Goals	F/G	Points
2015 Bradford Bulls	5	1	0	0	4
Total	5	1	0	0	4

=== Guildford Owls ===
On 28 August 2017, Ryan was selected in the 2017 Ron Massey Cup team of the year. In 2019, Ryan was selected to be the captain of Guildford for the 2019 season.
