= Michael Sio =

Samoa international rugby league footballer

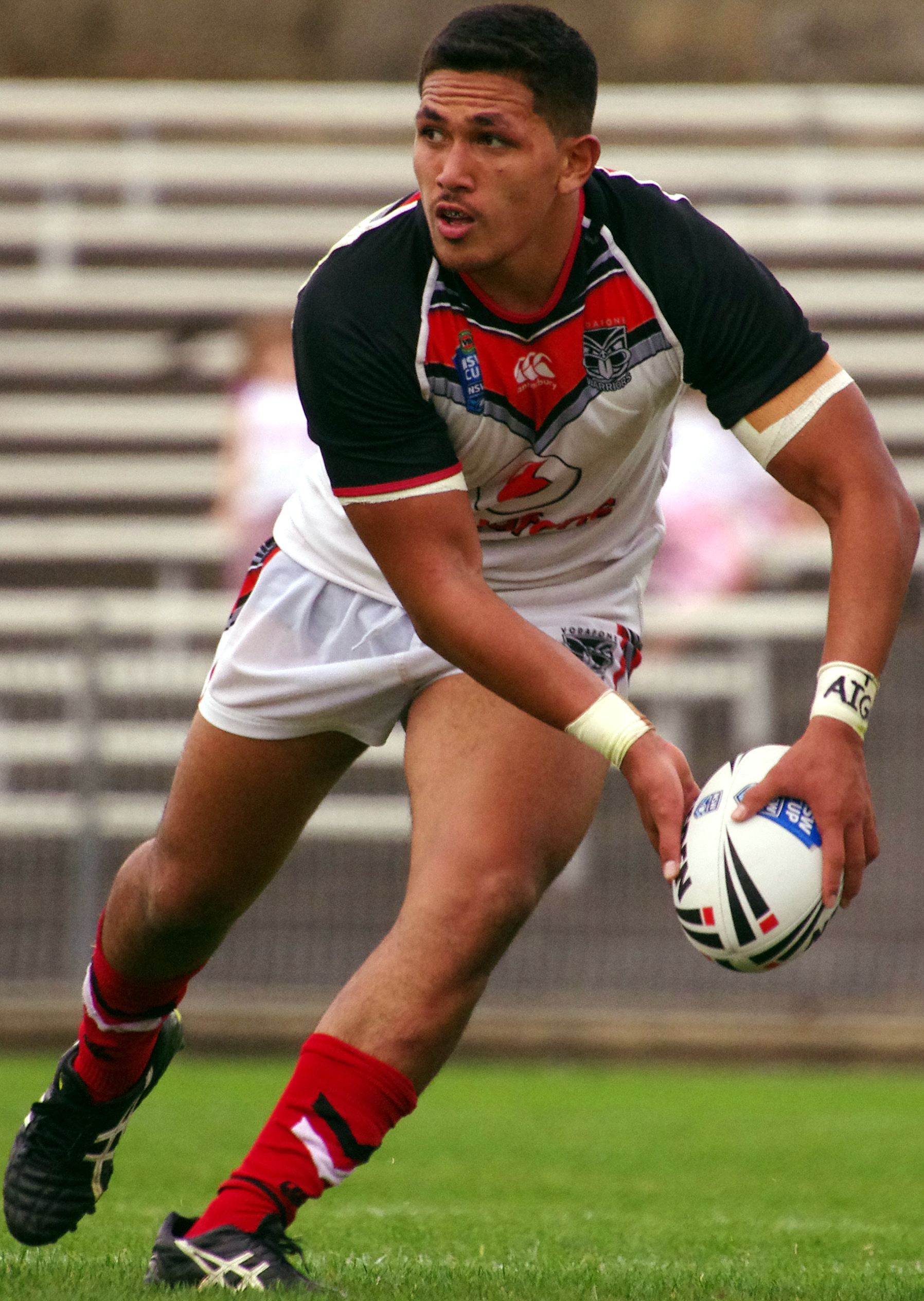

Personal information
- Born: 16 May 1993 (age 32); Auckland, New Zealand
- Height: 179 cm (5 ft 10 in)
- Weight: 94 kg (14 st 11 lb)

Playing information
- Position: Hooker, Lock, Second-row
Club
Years	Team	Pld	T	G	FG	P
2015–17	Wakefield Trinity (Wildcats)	45	16	0	0	64
2017(loan)	→ Dewsbury Rams	2	0	0	0	0
2017(loan)	→ Halifax	10	1	0	0	4
	Total	57	17	0	0	68
Representative
Years	Team	Pld	T	G	FG	P
2013–15	Samoa	6	0	0	0	0
- Source: As of 25 January 2018

Michael Sio (born 16 May 1993) is a Samoa international rugby league footballer who was most recently contracted to Wakefield Trinity in the Super League. He primarily plays as a hooker, and has represented Samoa at the 2013 Rugby League World Cup, 2014 Four Nations and 2015 Polynesian Cup.

== Early life ==
Sio was born in Auckland, New Zealand.

He attended St. Paul's College, where he was a prefect.

== Playing career ==
Sio played junior league for the Marist Saints before he was signed by the New Zealand Warriors. He played for the Junior Warriors in the Holden Cup, captaining the side in 2013. At the end of the 2013 season he was awarded the Sonny Fai Medal as the Junior Warriors' player of the year.

He played for the New Zealand Residents in 2011. Sio was called up to the Samoan squad for the 2013 World Cup to replace Masada Iosefa.

In May 2014, Michael played for Samoa in the 2014 Pacific International. On 7 October 2014, Sio was selected in the Samoan side for the 2014 Four Nations series. He came in as a late replacement to play in the 2015 Polynesian Cup test-match.

Sio joined the Mackay Cutters in the Queensland Cup for the 2015 season. However, on 22 June 2015, he signed a 1 1/2-year contract with Super League club Wakefield Trinity Wildcats. He left the club at the end of the 2017 season.
