= Stuart Howarth =

English rugby league footballer

Personal information
- Born: 26 January 1990 (age 36) England

Playing information
- Height: 6 ft 1 in (1.85 m)
- Weight: 14 st 11 lb (94 kg)
- Position: Stand-off, Scrum-half, Hooker, Second-row, Loose forward
Club
Years	Team	Pld	T	G	FG	P
	Wigan Warriors
2010(loan)	→ Blackpool Panthers	2	0	0	0	0
2011–12	Wakefield Trinity	22	3	0	0	12
2012–14	Salford City Reds	72	5	0	0	20
2013(loan)	→ St Helens	18	2	0	0	8
2014(loan)	→ Barrow Raiders	1	0	0	0	0
2015	Hull FC	5	0	0	0	0
2015(loan)	→ Doncaster	5	0	0	0	0
2015–16	Wakefield Trinity	18	3	0	0	12
2016(loan)	→ Bradford Bulls	9	0	0	0	0
2017	Workington Town	24	0	0	0	0
2018	Whitehaven	26	0	0	1	1
2019–20	Rochdale Hornets	6	0	0	0	0
	Total	208	13	0	1	53

Stuart Howarth (born 25 January 1990) is an English professional rugby league footballer who plays as a hooker or loose forward for the Rochdale Hornets in League 1.

He has played for Wigan Warriors (academy), Blackpool Panthers (loan), Wakefield Trinity Wildcats (two spells), Salford City Reds, St. Helens (loan), Barrow Raiders (loan), Hull FC, Doncaster (loan), Bradford Bulls (loan) and Workington Town.

A product of the Wigan Warriors academy, Howarth is a versatile player; having played at fullback, and stand-off as a youth and in the Wigan set-up. He has played for Hull FC and Salford City Reds, who loaned him to St. Helens. He made his first team debut for Wakefield Trinity Wildcats in 2011's Super League XVI, starting the game against Catalans Dragons as a loose forward.

== After rugby ==
It was announced on 16 April 2021 that Stuart had taken an appointment as a science teacher at St Peter's Catholic High School in Orrell, after retiring from rugby and qualifying as a teacher.
