= Jordan Crowther =

English rugby league footballer

Jordy Crowther
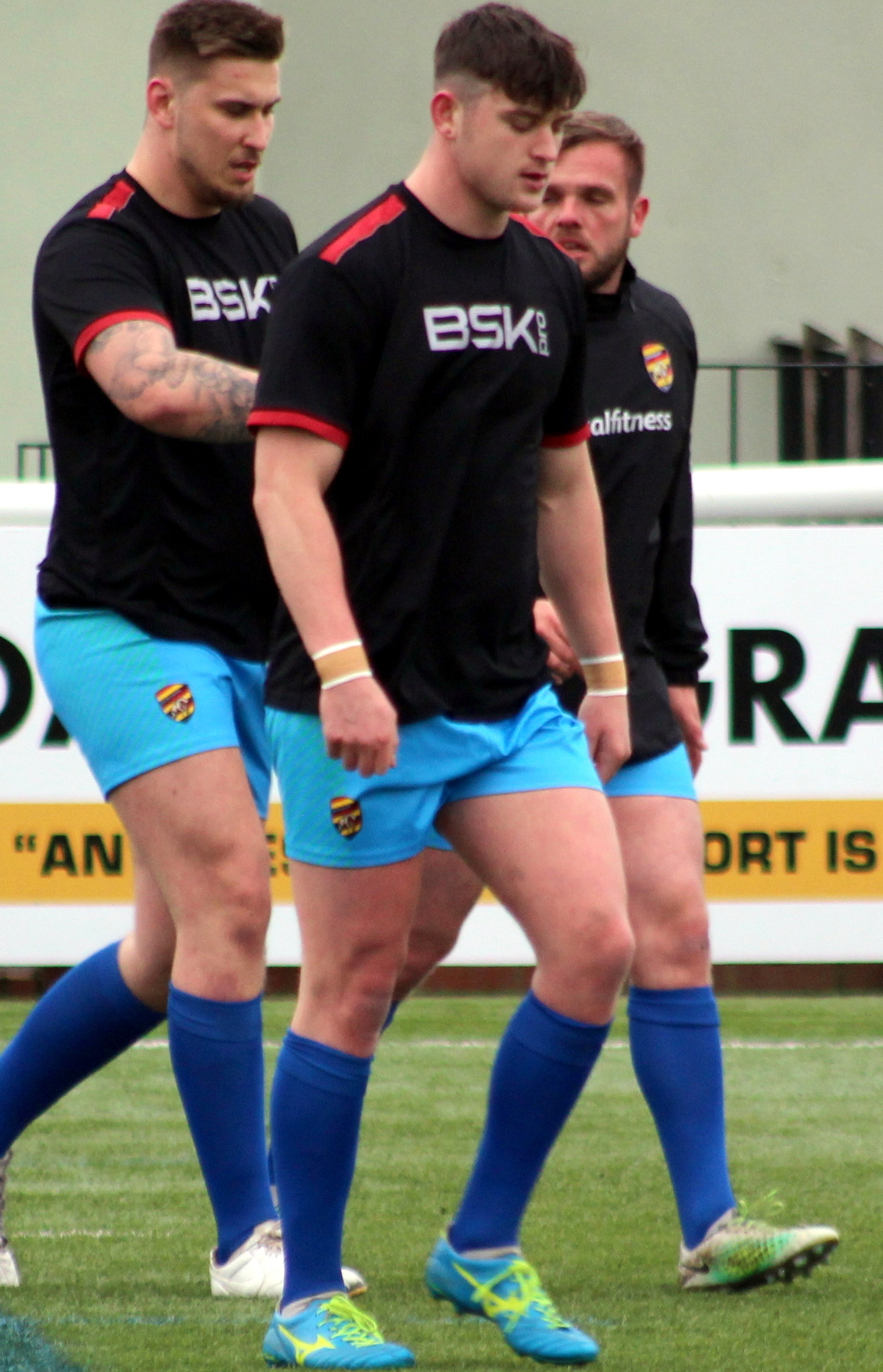

Personal information
- Full name: Jordan Crowther
- Born: 19 February 1997 (age 29) Wakefield, West Yorkshire, England
- Height: 6 ft 1 in (1.86 m)
- Weight: 15 st 10 lb (100 kg)

Playing information
- Position: Loose forward, Hooker
Club
Years	Team	Pld	T	G	FG	P
2014–23	Wakefield Trinity	86	4	0	0	16
2016(loan)	→ York City Knights	10	5	0	0	20
2017(loan)	→ Dewsbury Rams	8	0	0	0	0
2017(loan)	→ Oxford	3	0	0	0	0
2018(loan)	→ Dewsbury Rams	20	3	0	0	12
2019(loan)	→ Newcastle Thunder	1	0	0	0	0
2023(loan)	→ Warrington Wolves	8	0	0	0	0
2024–26	Warrington Wolves	20	2	0	0	8
2027–	Huddersfield Giants	0	0	0	0	0
	Total	156	14	0	0	56
- Source: As of 11 September 2026

Jordan Crowther (born 19 February 1997) is an English rugby league footballer who plays as a loose forward and hooker for the Huddersfield Giants in the Super League.

He has spent time on loan from Wakefield at the York City Knights, Oxford and Newcastle Thunder in League 1, and the Dewsbury Rams in the Championship.

== Background ==
Crowther was born in Wakefield, West Yorkshire, England.

His amateur club were the Westgate Wolves, and Crigglestone All Blacks, both in Wakefield. Jordan and his family have always been supporters of his home town club Wakefield Trinity RLFC. He was educated at Horbury Primary School followed by Horbury Academy

== Career ==
=== Wakefield Trinity ===
Jordan joined the club as a scholarship player and progressed through the Wakefield Trinity Academy system. He made his first team début against the Wigan Warriors in March 2014 and is the second-youngest forward ever to play for the club. From 2014 to 2018 Crowther was loaned out to lower league clubs including two stints at Dewsbury Rams, this is not unusual in the development of a young forward. In the 2019 season Crowther cemented his place as a regular in the back row and in turn gained a new contract at the club after a number of strong performances at Loose forward.

=== Warrington Wolves ===
On 29 September 2023 it was reported that he had signed a permanent two-year deal to stay at Warrington following on from his initial loan deal. On 8 June 2024, Crowther played in Warrington's 2024 Challenge Cup final loss against Wigan. On 7 June 2025, Crowther played in Warrington's 8-6 Challenge Cup final loss against Hull Kingston Rovers.

=== Huddersfield Giants ===
On 11 September 2026 it was reported that he had signed for Huddersfield Giants in the Super League on a 3-year deal.

== International career ==
Jordan represented England Academy against France Under-18s at Stade Albert Domec, Carcassonne. Jordan has also played for England U16s.
