= Matty Ashurst =

English professional rugby league footballer

Personal information
- Full name: Matthew Robert Ashurst
- Born: 1 November 1989 (age 36) Wigan, Greater Manchester, England
- Height: 6 ft 1 in (1.85 m)
- Weight: 15 st 8 lb (99 kg)

Playing information
- Position: Second-row
Club
| Years | Team | Pld | T | G | FG | P |
|---|---|---|---|---|---|---|
| 2009–11 | St Helens | 60 | 10 | 0 | 0 | 40 |
| 2012–14 | Salford Red Devils | 75 | 12 | 0 | 0 | 48 |
| 2015–24 | Wakefield Trinity | 230 | 45 | 0 | 0 | 180 |
| 2025–26 | Oldham | 54 | 24 | 2 | 0 | 100 |
| 2027– | Salford | 0 | 0 | 0 | 0 | 0 |
| | Total | 419 | 91 | 2 | 0 | 368 |
- Source: As of 21 October 2026

Matthew Ashurst (born 1 November 1989) is an English professional rugby league footballer who last played as a second-row forward for Salford RLFC in the RFL Championship.

He has played for St Helens and the Salford Red Devils in the Super League.

== Background ==
Ashurst was born in Wigan, Greater Manchester, England.

== Career ==
=== St Helens ===
Ashurst is predominantly a second-row and signed for St. Helens from Wigan St Patrick's having previously played junior football for Orrell St James. Ashurst made his first-team début for St. Helens in a 38–12 win over Salford in round 5 of 2009's Super League XIV, where he came off the substitutes' bench. It turned out to be a break through year for the St Helens Academy product, with Ashurst making 20 appearances for the St Helens R.F.C. first team, 15 of which came off the substitutes bench. He scored one try in these games and won the clubs young player of the year award. In 2010 and 2011 his first team opportunities were far from halted, in fact enhanced thanks to injuries, and Ashurst managed to find the line much more than in his début year. Ashurst made a total of 60 appearances in his three seasons for St Helens.

Salford

Ashurst joined Salford for the 2012 season and remained with them for three seasons. He made 75 appearances for the club.

=== Wakefield Trinity ===
Ashurst made 230 appearances over ten years at Wakefield and was named in the Super League Dream Team in 2018. He played 27 games for Wakefield Trinity in the Super League XXVIII season as the club finished bottom of the table and were relegated to the RFL Championship which ended their 24-year stay in the top flight.

On 8 June 2024 he captained Wakefield to the RFL 1895 Cup at Wembley Stadium, defeating Sheffield 50-6. He also captained the club in their promotion back to Super League at the end of the 2024 season beating Toulouse Olympique 36-0 in the Championship Grand Final in what was his testimonial year for 10 years service to the club.

=== Oldham RLFC ===
On 13 November 2024, it was reported that he had signed for Oldham RLFC in the RFL Championship on a two-year deal.

=== Salford RLFC (re-join) ===
On 21 October 2026 it was reported that he had signed for Salford RLFC in the RFL Championship on a 2-year deal.
