= Reece Lyne =

England rugby league footballer (born 1992)

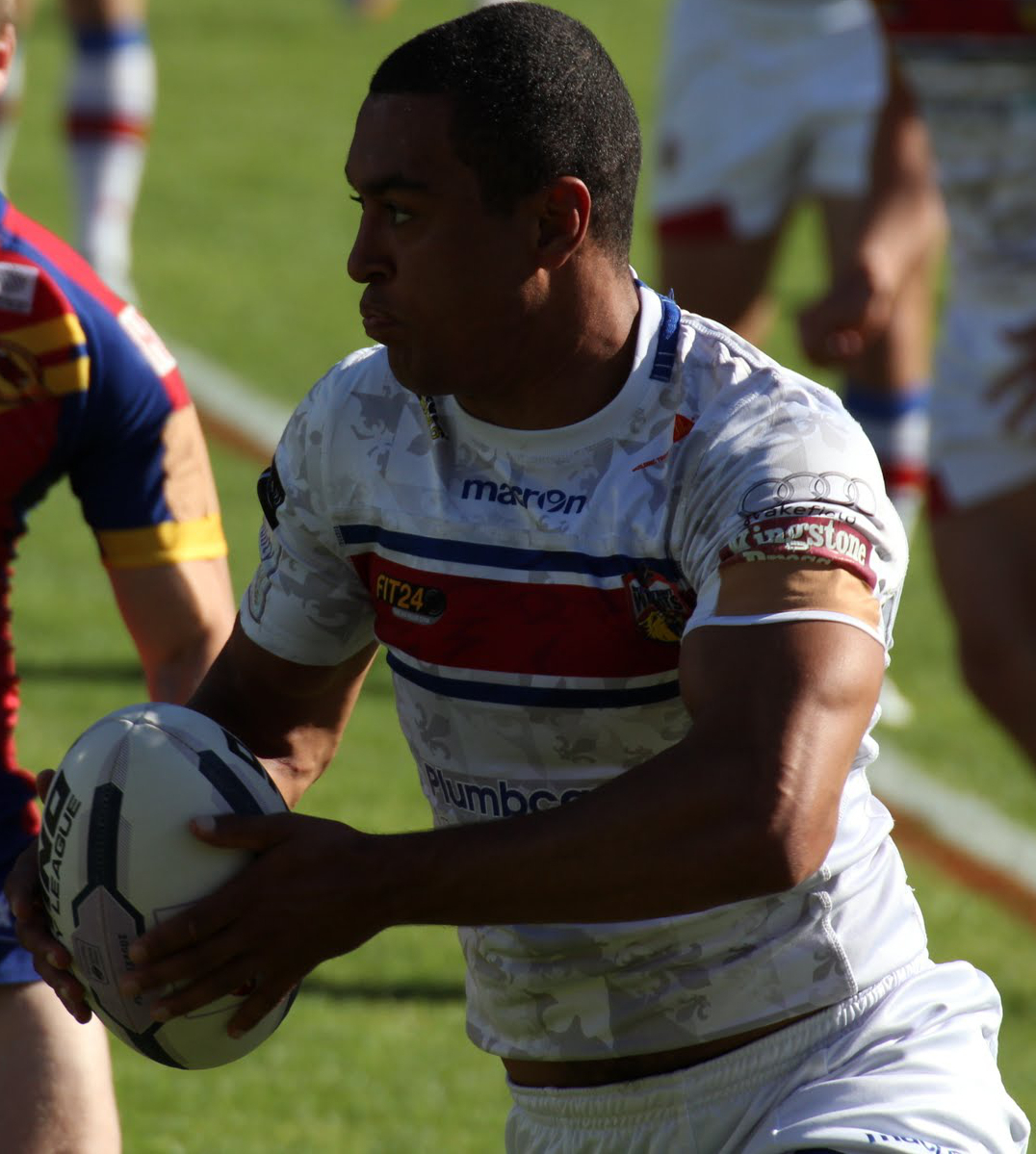

Personal information
- Born: 2 December 1992 (age 33) Hull, Humberside, England
- Height: 6 ft 4 in (1.93 m)
- Weight: 13 st 5 lb (85 kg)

Playing information
- Position: Centre, Wing
Club
Years	Team	Pld	T	G	FG	P
2010–12	Hull F.C.	14	4	0	0	16
2013–23	Wakefield Trinity	233	64	0	0	256
2024–26	Doncaster	63	25	1	0	102
	Total	310	93	1	0	374
Representative
Years	Team	Pld	T	G	FG	P
2018–21	England	2	0	0	0	0
- Source: As of 07 August 2024

Reece Lyne (born 2 December 1992) is an English former rugby league footballer who played as a centre for England at international level.

He has previously played for Wakefield Trinity and Hull F.C. in the Super League, and played on the wing earlier in his career.

== Background ==
Lyne was born in Kingston upon Hull, Humberside, England. He is of Jamaican descent.

== Early years ==
He attended David Lister School from 2004 to 2009, and also played for Ideal Isberg Rugby Club during his childhood years.

== Playing career ==
=== Hull FC ===
Lyne started his playing career in 2010 at Hull F.C.

=== Wakefield Trinity ===
At the end of the 2012 season he signed a three-year deal with Wakefield Trinity. Having made his 100th appearance for the club at home to his old club Hull F.C., he wore the number four shirt for the 2017 season. Lyne played 15 games for Wakefield Trinity in the Super League XXVIII season as the club finished bottom of the table and were relegated to the RFL Championship which ended their 24-year stay in the top flight. During his 10 seasons with Wakefield he made 233 appearances and scored 64 tries.

=== Doncaster RLFC ===
On 31 October 2023, it was announced that Lyne had signed a three-year deal with Doncaster RLFC.

== International career ==
In July 2018 he was selected in the England Knights Performance squad.

In 2018 he was selected for England against France at the Leigh Sports Village.

He was selected in England 9s squad for the 2019 Rugby League World Cup 9s.
