= Jack Walton =

Jack Walton may refer to:

- Jack C. Walton (1881–1949), American politician
- Jack Walton (basketball) (1926–1952), American basketball player
- Jack Walton (footballer) (born 1998), English footballer
- Jack Walton (rugby league) (fl. 1902–1913)
- Jack Walton (singer) (born 1996), English participant on The X Factor

== See also ==
- John Walton (disambiguation)
