= John Walton =

John Walton may refer to:

== People ==
=== In sport ===
- John Walton (rugby league), rugby league footballer of the 1900s
- John Walton (rugby union) (1879–1947), English rugby union international
- John Walton (cricketer) (1888–1970), English cricketer
- John Walton (footballer) (1928–1979), English footballer with several clubs
- John Walton (American football) (born 1947), American football player
- John Walton (Formula One) (1957-2004), late Formula One team manager
- John Walton (darts player) (born 1961), former BDO World Darts Champion and BDO World Masters Champion
- John Walton (sports broadcaster) (born 1973), American radio sports announcer

=== In politics ===
- John Walton (Continental Congress) (1738–1783), Georgia continental congressman, signer of the Articles of Confederation
- Sir John Lawson Walton (1852–1908), British MP and attorney general of England and Wales
- Jack C. Walton (John Calloway Walton, 1881–1949), governor of Oklahoma
- John Walton, Baron Walton of Detchant (1922–2016), British politician
- John Walton (Australian politician) (1927–1994), Victorian state politician

=== Other ===
- John Walton (translator) (fl. 1410), English Augustinian canon and poet
- John Walton (bishop) (d. 1490?), English Augustinian abbot and archbishop of Dublin
- John Walton (priest) (1565-1646), English Anglican priest
- John Walton (entomologist) (1784–1862), English entomologist
- John Wilson Walton-Wilson (1823–1910), English architect
- John Walton (botanist) (1895–1971), British botanist and paleobotanist
- John Ike Walton, founding member of 13th Floor Elevators, a 1960s Texas rock group
- John T. Walton (1946–2005), son of Walmart founder Sam Walton
- John Walton (actor) (1952–2014), Australian actor
- John H. Walton (born 1952), Old Testament scholar, professor of Old Testament at Wheaton College
- John K. Walton, professor specializing in the history of the development of tourism
- John Isiah Walton (born 1985), American artist

== Fictional people ==
- John Walton, character in The $5,000,000 Counterfeiting Plot
- "John-Boy" Walton and John Walton Sr., characters on the US television series The Waltons
