= Tommy Poynton =

England international rugby league footballer

Personal information
- Full name: Thomas Poynton
- Born: second ¼ 1885 Pontefract district, England
- Died: second ¼ 1942 (aged 57) Pontefract district, England

Playing information
- Position: The three-quarters, i.e. Wing, Centre
Club
Years	Team	Pld	T	G	FG	P
1906–15	Wakefield Trinity	203	111	6	0	345
Representative
Years	Team	Pld	T	G	FG	P
	Yorkshire
1911	England	1	0	0	0	0

Thomas Poynton (second ¼ 1885 – second ¼ 1942) was an English professional rugby league footballer who played in the 1900s and 1910s. He played at representative level for England and Yorkshire, and at club level for Wakefield Trinity, as a three-quarter, i.e. wing, or centre.

== Background ==
Tommy Poynton's birth was registered in Pontefract district, West Riding of Yorkshire, and his death aged 57 was registered in Pontefract district, West Riding of Yorkshire, England.

== Playing career ==
=== Club career ===
Poynton made his début for Wakefield Trinity during February 1906.

Poynton played at centre in Wakefield Trinity's 8–2 victory over Huddersfield in the 1910 Yorkshire Cup Final during the 1910–11 season at Headingley, Leeds on Saturday 3 December 1910.

Poynton played at centre in Wakefield Trinity's 0–6 defeat by Hull F.C. in the 1914 Challenge Cup Final during the 1913–14 season at Thrum Hall, Halifax, in front of a crowd of 19,000.

Poynton's Testimonial match at Wakefield Trinity was a joint testimonial for Arthur Burton, Arthur Kenealy "Nealy" Crosland, William "Billy" Lynch, and Thomas "Tommy" Poynton, and took place against Yorkshire at Belle Vue, Wakefield on Wednesday 27 April 1922.

=== Representative honours ===
Poynton won a cap for England while at Wakefield Trinity in 1911 against Australia.

Poynton won cap(s) for Yorkshire while at Wakefield Trinity.

== Outside Rugby League ==
Tommy Poynton was permanently disabled during World War I.

== Personal life ==
Thomas Poynton is related to the rugby league footballer, Harold Poynton.
