= Billy Lynch (rugby league) =

England international rugby league footballer

Personal information
- Full name: William J. Lynch
- Born: 2 September 1882 Ilkeston, Derbyshire
- Died: 24 April 1963 (aged 80) Castleford, Yorkshire

Playing information
- Height: 5 ft 11.5 in (1.816 m)
- Weight: 13 st 5 lb (85 kg)
- Position: Wing, Centre
Club
Years	Team	Pld	T	G	FG	P
1907–19	Wakefield Trinity	258	71	2	0	217
Representative
Years	Team	Pld	T	G	FG	P
≤1907–≥10	Yorkshire
1910	England	1	0	0	0	0

William J. Lynch (2 Sep 1882 – 24 Apr 1963), also listed as Billie Lynch, was a professional rugby league footballer who played in the 1900s and 1910s. He played at representative level for England and Yorkshire, and at club level for Wakefield Trinity, as a wing or centre.

== Playing career ==
=== Challenge Cup Final appearances ===
Lynch played at centre in Wakefield Trinity's 17-0 victory over Hull F.C. in the 1909 Challenge Cup Final during the 1908–09 season at Headingley, Leeds on Tuesday 20 April 1909, in front of a crowd of 23,587. and played at centre in the 0-6 defeat by Hull F.C. in the 1914 Challenge Cup Final during the 1913–14 season at Thrum Hall, Halifax, in front of a crowd of 19,000.

=== County Cup Final appearances ===
Lynch played at centre in Wakefield Trinity's 8-2 victory over Huddersfield in the 1910 Yorkshire Cup Final during the 1910–11 season at Headingley, Leeds on Saturday 3 December 1910.

=== Notable tour matches ===
Lynch played at centre, and scored the try in Wakefield Trinity's 5-5 draw with New Zealand in the tour match at Belle Vue, Wakefield on Wednesday 23 October 1907, and played centre in the 20-13 victory over Australia in the 1908–09 Kangaroo tour of Great Britain match at Belle Vue, Wakefield on Saturday 19 December 1908.

=== Club career ===
Lynch made his début for Wakefield Trinity during September 1907.

=== Testimonial match ===
Lynch's Testimonial match at Wakefield Trinity was joint testimonial for; Arthur Burton, Arthur Kenealy "Nealy" Crosland, William "Billy" Lynch, and Thomas "Tommy" Poynton, and took place against Yorkshire at Belle Vue, Wakefield on Wednesday 27 April 1922.

=== Representative honours ===
Lynch won a cap for England while at Wakefield Trinity in 1910 against Wales.

Lynch won cap(s) for Yorkshire while at Wakefield Trinity.

== Outside of rugby league ==
Billy Lynch was the landlord of the Windmill Inn, Doncaster Road, Foulby, and on 22 March 1916 he arranged a rugby league match for the benefit of Leonard Hewitt, who had been incapacitated while in training with His Majesty's forces. The teams were captained by Billy Batten, and Billy Lynch.
