= Herbert Kershaw =

GB & England international rugby league footballer

Personal information
- Born: first ¼ 1885 Wakefield, England
- Died: February 1955 (aged 69) Wakefield, England

Playing information
- Height: 5 ft 9 in (175 cm)
- Weight: 12 st 6 lb (79 kg)

Rugby union
- Position: Scrum-half
Club
Years	Team	Pld	T	G	FG	P
1904–06	Wakefield RFC
Representative
Years	Team	Pld	T	G	FG	P
≥1904–≤06	Yorkshire

Rugby league
- Position: Forward
Club
Years	Team	Pld	T	G	FG	P
1906–21	Wakefield Trinity	288	46	17	0	172
Representative
Years	Team	Pld	T	G	FG	P
≥1906–≤21	Yorkshire
1910–11	England	3	1	0	0	3
1910	Great Britain	2	3	0	0	9

Herbert Kershaw (first ¼ 1885 – February 1955), also known by the nickname of "Harry", was an English rugby union, and professional rugby league footballer who played in the 1900s, 1910s and 1920s. He played representative level rugby union (RU) for Yorkshire, and at club level for Wakefield RFC, and representative level rugby league (RL) for Great Britain, England and Yorkshire, and at club level for Wakefield Trinity (captain), as a forward.

After retirement from rugby league, in 1928 Wakefield RFC employed him as a bagman and he also assisted in training, paying him 2s/6d a week, (based on increases in average earnings, this would be approximately £20.97 in 2016).

== Background ==
Kershaw was born in Wakefield, West Riding of Yorkshire, England, he was the landlord of the Admiral Duncan Inn, Thornes Lane, Wakefield from 1914 to 1926, and the Brewers' Arms, Westgate, Wakefield c. 1927, he died aged 69 in Wakefield, West Riding of Yorkshire, England, and he is buried in Thornes Parish Church of Saint James, Denby Dale Road, Wakefield, West Yorkshire, England.

== Playing career ==
=== Challenge Cup Final appearances ===
Kershaw played as a forward in Wakefield Trinity's 17–0 victory over Hull F.C. in the 1908–09 Challenge Cup Final during the 1908–09 season at Headingley, Leeds on Tuesday 20 April 1909, in front of a crowd of 23,587. and played as a forward was captain, and five minutes after the half-time restart he was sent off for kicking in the 0–6 defeat by Hull F.C. in the 1913–14 Challenge Cup Final during the 1913–14 season at Thrum Hall, Halifax, in front of a crowd of 19,000.

=== County Cup Final appearances ===
Kershaw played as a forward in Wakefield Trinity's 8–2 victory over Huddersfield in the 1910–11 Yorkshire Cup Final during the 1910–11 season at Headingley, Leeds on Saturday 3 December 1910.

=== Notable tour matches ===
Kershaw played as a forward in Wakefield Trinity's 20–13 victory over Australia in the 1908–09 Kangaroo tour of Great Britain match at Belle Vue, Wakefield on Saturday 19 December 1908.

=== Testimonial match ===
Kershaw's Testimonial match for Wakefield Trinity took place against Batley at Belle Vue, Wakefield on Saturday 12 February 1921, it was a joint Testimonial match with George Taylor.

=== Club career ===
Kershaw made his début for Wakefield Trinity during January 1906.

=== Representative honours ===
Kershaw won caps for England (RL) while at Wakefield Trinity in 1910 against Wales, in 1911 against Wales, and Australia, and won caps for Great Britain (RL) while at Wakefield Trinity on the 1910 Great Britain Lions tour of Australia and New Zealand against Australia, Australasia, and New Zealand.

Kershaw won cap(s) for Yorkshire while at Wakefield Trinity.

== Contemporaneous Article Extract ==
"Played his earliest football with Thornes Lane Rovers and Thornes United, then at scrum half for Wakefield R.U. he gained Yorkshire County R.U. honours. His entry into Trinity's ranks came at a time when the highly successful half-back combination of Slater and Newbould was in full swing – but he proved himself a versatile player and when, in the Cup semi-final against Wigan, Trinity found themselves without a loose-forward, Herbert stepped into the breach. . He played at loose forward in the Challenge Cup Final v. Hull FC, and that became his settled position. Not only that, but he went on the 1910 Tour as loose-forward, and played in the Brisbane Test"
