= 1913–14 Challenge Cup =

Rugby league competition

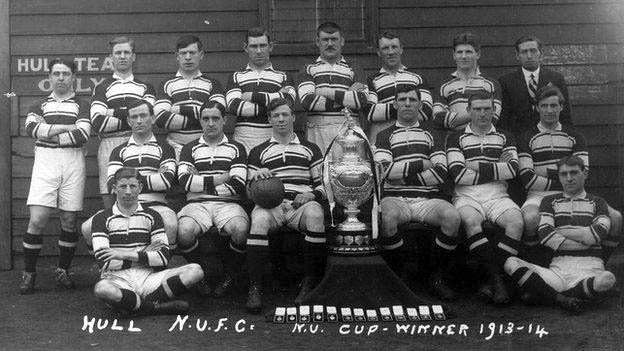
- Duration: 5 rounds
- Winners: Hull
- Runners-up: Wakefield Trinity

The 1913–14 Challenge Cup was the 18th staging of rugby league's oldest knockout competition, the Challenge Cup.

== First round ==
Date	Team one	Score one	Team two	Score two
28 Feb	Barrow	6	Broughton Rangers	11
28 Feb	Bramley	4	Halifax	13
28 Feb	Castleford	8	Wigan	27
28 Feb	Elland	2	Featherstone Rovers	7
28 Feb	Huddersfield	119	Swinton Park	0
28 Feb	Hull FC	8	Salford	5
28 Feb	Hull Kingston Rovers	62	Millom	0
28 Feb	Leeds	39	Keighley	0
28 Feb	Leigh	0	Oldham	9
28 Feb	Rochdale Hornets	9	Hunslet	3
28 Feb	Runcorn	16	Bradford Northern	6
28 Feb	St Helens	27	Wigan Highfield	4
28 Feb	Wakefield Trinity	2	Swinton	0
28 Feb	Warrington	3	Batley	3
28 Feb	Widnes	16	Dewsbury	0
28 Feb	York	45	Glasson	0
03 Mar	Batley	6	Warrington	5

== Second round ==
Date	Team one	Score one	Team two	Score two
14 Mar	Broughton Rangers	24	York	4
14 Mar	Featherstone Rovers	3	Hull FC	27
14 Mar	Halifax	11	Batley	0
14 Mar	Hull Kingston Rovers	2	Huddersfield	17
14 Mar	Rochdale Hornets	3	St Helens	3
14 Mar	Runcorn	2	Wigan	13
14 Mar	Wakefield Trinity	9	Leeds	8
14 Mar	Widnes	8	Oldham	0
18 Mar	St Helens	0	Rochdale Hornets	10

== Quarterfinals ==
Date	Team one	Score one	Team two	Score two
21 Mar	Halifax	0	Hull FC	13
21 Mar	Huddersfield	21	Widnes	10
21 Mar	Rochdale Hornets	7	Broughton Rangers	9
21 Mar	Wakefield Trinity	9	Wigan	6

== Semifinals ==
Date	Team one	Score one	Team two	Score two
04 Apr	Broughton Rangers	3	Wakefield Trinity	3
04 Apr	Huddersfield	3	Hull FC	11
08 Apr	Wakefield Trinity	5	Broughton Rangers	0

== Final ==
Date	Team one	Score one	Team two	Score two
18 Apr	Hull	6	Wakefield Trinity	0

A Hull team featuring Billy Batten and Jim Devereux defeated Wakefield Trinity 6-0. This was Hull's first Challenge Cup win in their fourth final appearance.

Hull: 6

Tries: Jack Harrison, Alfred Francis

Wakefield Trinity: 0

Half-time: 0-0

Attendance: 19,000 (at Thrum Hall, Halifax)

Teams: Hull: Rogers, Jack Harrison, Billy Batten, Herb Gilbert, Alfred Francis, Jim Devereux, Billie Anderson, Tom Herridge, William Holder, Dick Taylor, Percy Oldham, Joe Hammill, Steve Darmody

Wakefield Trinity: Leonard Land, Benjamin Johnson, William "Billy" Lynch, Thomas "Tommy" Poynton, Bruce Howarth, Jonty Parkin, William Milligan/Millican, Albert Dixon, Arthur Kenealy "Nealy" Crosland, William Beattie, Herbert Kershaw, Ernest Parkin, Arthur Burton
