= 1913–14 Lancashire Cup =

1913 Lancashire Cup
- Structure: Regional knockout competition
- Teams: 12
- Winners: Oldham
- Runners-up: Wigan

The 1913 Lancashire Cup was the ninth year of this regional rugby league competition. The cup was won by Oldham who beat the holders Wigan in the final at Wheater's Field, Broughton, Salford, by a score of 5–0. The attendance at the final was 18,000 and receipts £610.

== Background ==
Warwickside team, Coventry, did not enter this year so the number of teams entering this year's competition was reduced to 12. There were four byes in the first round.

== Competition and results ==
=== Round 1 ===
Involved 4 matches (with four byes) and 12 clubs

Game No	Fixture date	Home team	Score	Away team	Venue	Att	Rec	Notes	Ref
1	Sat 18 October 1913	Broughton Rangers	3–15	Oldham	Wheater's Field				
2	Sat 18 October 1913	Warrington	8–15	Barrow	Wilderspool				
3	Sat 19 October 1913	Widnes	24–2	Swinton	Lowerhouse Lane				
4	Sat 19 October 1913	Wigan	9–2	Rochdale Hornets	Central Park				
5		Leigh		bye					
6		St. Helens		bye					
7		Runcorn		bye					
8		Salford		bye					

=== Round 2 – quarterfinals ===
Game No	Fixture date	Home team	Score	Away team	Venue	Att	Rec	Notes	Ref
1	Sat 1 November 1913	Leigh	8–7	Barrow	Mather Lane				
2	Sat 1 November 1913	Oldham	14–8	Widnes	Watersheddings				
3	Sat 1 November 1913	St. Helens	26–6	Runcorn	Knowsley Road				
4	Sat 1 November 1913	Salford	7–9	Wigan	The Willows				

=== Round 3 – semifinals ===
Game No	Fixture date	Home team	Score	Away team	Venue	Att	Rec	Notes	Ref
1	Sat 15 November 1913	Leigh	0–16	Wigan	Mather Lane				
2	Sat 15 November 1913	Oldham	17–5	St. Helens	Watersheddings				

=== Final ===
Game No	Fixture date	Home team	Score	Away team	Venue	Att	Rec	Notes	Ref
	Saturday 6 December 1913	Oldham	5–0	Wigan	Wheater's Field	18000	£610	1	

==== Teams and scorers ====
Oldham	No.	Wigan
	Teams	
Alf Wood	1	Billy Seddon
Ernest Oliver	2	Lew Bradley
Viv Farnsworth	3	Bert Jenkins
Billy Hall	4	Gwyn Thomas
Tom Williams	5	Joe Miller
Tom White	6	Fred Gleave
EA Anlezark	7	Johnny Thomas
Jim Wright	8	Charlie Seeling Sr.
Joe Ferguson	9	Percy Coldrick
David B. Davies	10	Dick Ramsdale
Charlie Robeson	11	Arthur Francis
David Holland	12	Rees Richards
Albert Avery	13	Dick Silcock
5	Score	0
5	HT	0
	Scorers	
	Tries	
Unknown	T	
	T	
	Goals	
	G	
	Drop goals	
	DG	
Referee		

Scoring – Try = three (3) points – Goal = two (2) points – Drop goal = two (2) points

=== The road to success ===
First round
Broughton Rangers	3
Oldham	15
Widnes	24
Swinton	2
St. Helens
bye
Runcorn
bye
Leigh
bye
Warrington	8
Barrow	15
Salford
bye
Wigan	9
Rochdale Hornets	2

Second round
Oldham	14
Widnes	8
St. Helens	26
Runcorn	6
Leigh	8
Barrow	7
Salford	7
Wigan	9

Semifinals
Oldham	17
St. Helens	5
Leigh	0
Wigan	16

Final
Oldham	5
Wigan	0

== See also ==
- 1913–14 Northern Rugby Football Union season

== Notes ==
- 1 Wheater's Field was the home ground of Broughton Rangers.
