= Joe Ferguson (rugby league) =

England international rugby league footballer

Personal information
- Full name: Joseph Ferguson
- Born: c. 1879 Cumberland, England
- Died: October 1936 (aged c. 56–57) Oldham, England

Playing information
- Position: Fullback, Prop, Hooker, Second-row
Club
Years	Team	Pld	T	G	FG	P
1899–23	Oldham	626	62	540	0	1266
Representative
Years	Team	Pld	T	G	FG	P
1905–14	Cumberland	31	2	31	0	68
1900–05	Lancashire	15	0	7	0	14
1904–09	England	4	1	4	0	11
1902–04	Lancashire trial	3	0	0	0	0

Joseph Ferguson (c. 1879 – October 1936) was an English professional rugby league footballer who played between 1899 and 1923. He played at representative level for England, Cumberland and Lancashire, and at club level for Oldham, as a fullback, prop, hooker, or second-row.

== Background ==
Joe Ferguson was born in Cumberland, and his death aged c. 56–57 was registered in Oldham district, Lancashire, England.

== Playing career ==
=== Championship final appearances ===
Ferguson played as a forward in Oldham's 3–7 defeat by Wigan in the Championship Final during the 1908–09 season.

=== County League appearances ===
Ferguson played in Oldham's victories in the Lancashire League during the 1900–01 season, 1907–08 season, 1909–10 season and 1921–22 season.

=== Challenge Cup Final appearances ===
Ferguson played as a forward in Oldham's 3–17 defeat by Warrington in the 1907 Challenge Cup Final during the 1906–07 season at Wheater's Field, Broughton on Saturday 27 April 1907, in front of a crowd of 18,500, and played as a forward in the 5–8 defeat by Dewsbury in the 1912 Challenge Cup Final during the 1911–12 season at Headingley, Leeds on Saturday 27 April 1912, in front of a crowd of 15,271.

=== County Cup Final appearances ===
Ferguson played as a forward in Oldham's 9–10 defeat by Wigan in the 1908 Lancashire Cup Final during the 1910–11 season at Wheater's Field, Broughton, Salford on Saturday 19 December 1908, he played, and scored a drop goal from the half-way line (i.e. 50-metres, 54-yards 25-inches), in the 4–3 victory over Swinton in the 1910 Lancashire Cup Final during the 1910–11 season at Wheater's Field, Broughton, Salford on Saturday 3 December 1910, about Joe Ferguson's time, there was Oldham's victory in the 1913 Lancashire Cup Final during the 1913–14 season on Saturday 6 December 1913, and the 1919–20 Lancashire Cup Final during the 1919–20 season on Saturday 6 December 1919.

=== Career records ===
Ferguson holds Oldham's "Most Career Appearances" record with 626 appearances.

=== Club career ===
Ferguson attended, Oldham's 19–9 victory over Hunslet in the 1899 Challenge Cup Final during the 1898–99 season at Fallowfield Stadium, Manchester, as a guest of Oldham, in a successful attempt to convince him to join Oldham rather than Halifax. Joe Ferguson's last game for Oldham was against St. Helens at Knowsley Road, St. Helens on Saturday 14 April 1923, he was aged forty-four.

=== Representative honours ===
Ferguson won a cap for England in the 3–9 defeat by Other Nationalities at Central Park, Wigan on Tuesday 5 April 1904, in the first ever international rugby league match, that was an experimental 12-a-side match, he also won caps for England while at Oldham in 1905 against Other Nationalities (a 15-a-side match), in 1908 against New Zealand (a 13-a-side match), and in 1909 against Wales (a 13-a-side match).

Ferguson was considered a "Probable" for the 1910 Great Britain Lions tour of Australia and New Zealand, but ultimately he was not selected, as he declined an invitation to tour due to business reasons.

Ferguson won caps for Cumberland and Lancashire while at Oldham.

== Honoured at Oldham ==
Joe Ferguson is an Oldham Hall of Fame Inductee.
