= Tom White (rugby) =

GB & England international rugby league & union footballer

Personal information
- Born: c. 1885; Bath, England
- Died: February 1943 (aged 58); Oldham, England

Playing information

Rugby union
Club
Years	Team	Pld	T	G	FG	P
1902–≤03	Bath	27
≤1903–≤03	Bristol
≤1904–04	Bath
	Total	27	0	0	0	0
Representative
Years	Team	Pld	T	G	FG	P
≤1905–≤05	Somerset

Rugby league
- Position: Wing, Stand-off, Scrum-half
Club
Years	Team	Pld	T	G	FG	P
1905–13	Oldham	224	49	81		309
Representative
Years	Team	Pld	T	G	FG	P
1906	Lancashire	1	1	0	0	3
1908–11	England	5	2	0	0	6
1908	Great Britain	1	0	1	0	2

Tom White (c. 1885 – February 1943) was an English rugby union and professional rugby league footballer who played in the 1900s and 1910s. He played representative level rugby union (RU) for Somerset, at armed services level for the Army, and at club level for Bath (two spells) (captain) and Bristol as a goal-kicking scrum-half or fly-half/outside-half, and representative level rugby league (RL) for Great Britain, England and Lancashire, and at club level for Oldham, as a goal-kicking wing, stand-off, or scrum-half.

== Background ==
Tom White was born in Bath, Somerset, England, and he served with the Manchester Regiment during World War I. He died in February 1943.

== Rugby union career ==
Tom White made his debut for Bath against Knowle RFC (in Knowle, Bristol) on Saturday 15 February 1902, he transferred from Bath to Bristol, he transferred from Bristol to Bath, he played his last match for Bath against Taunton R.F.C. on Saturday 16 April 1904, he changed rugby football codes from rugby union to rugby league when he transferred from Bath to Oldham during February 1905.

Tom White won cap(s) for Somerset (RU) while at Bath/Bristol. He was a non-playing reserve-to-travel for England (RU) against Ireland in the 1904 Home Nations Championship match at Rectory Field, Blackheath, London on Saturday 13 February 1904.

== Rugby league career ==
=== Oldham ===
White made his début for Oldham in the 8–5 victory over Bradford F.C. at Watersheddings, Oldham on Monday 20 March 1905, he scored his last try, and played his last match for Oldham in the 7–10 defeat by Leigh at Mather Lane (adjacent to the Bridgewater Canal), Leigh on Saturday 13 December 1913.

Tom White played in Oldham's victory in the Championship during the 1904–05 season, and played scrum-half and scored two tries in the 20–7 victory over Wigan in the Championship Final during the 1910–11 season at Wheater's Field, Broughton, Salford on Saturday 6 May 1911, in front of a crowd of 15,543.

White played right wing in Oldham's 3–17 defeat by Warrington in the 1907 Championship Final during the 1906–07 season at Wheater's Field, Broughton, Salford on Saturday 27 April 1907, in front of a crowd of 18,500.

White played stand-off in Oldham's 16–9 victory over Broughton Rangers in the 1907–08 Lancashire Cup Final during the 1907–08 season at Athletic Grounds, Rochdale on Saturday 30 November 1907, played stand-off in the 9–10 defeat by Wigan in the 1908–09 Lancashire Cup Final during the 1908–09 season at Wheater's Field, Broughton, Salford on Saturday 19 December 1908, played stand-off in the 4–3 victory over Swinton in the 1910–11 Lancashire Cup Final during the 1910–11 season at Wheater's Field, Broughton, Salford on Saturday 3 December 1910, and played stand-off in the 5–0 victory over Wigan in the 1913–14 Lancashire Cup Final during the 1913–14 season at Wheater's Field, Broughton, Salford on Saturday 6 December 1913.

=== Representative honours ===
White won caps for England (RL) while at Oldham in 1908 against Wales, in 1910 against Wales (2 matches), in 1911 against Wales, and Australia, and won a cap for Great Britain (RL) while at Oldham in 1908 against New Zealand.

He also won cap(s) for Lancashire (RL) while at Oldham.
