= Tommy Newbould =

GB & England international rugby league footballer

Personal information
- Full name: Thomas Henry Newbould
- Born: fourth ¼ 1880 Wakefield district, England
- Died: 27 October 1964 (aged 83) Pontefract district, England

Playing information
- Height: 5 ft 6 in (1.68 m)
- Weight: 12 st 0 lb (76 kg)

Rugby union
Club
Years	Team	Pld	T	G	FG	P
–1902	Castleford RUFC
Representative
Years	Team	Pld	T	G	FG	P
1904	Yorkshire

Rugby league
- Position: Stand-off, Scrum-half
Club
Years	Team	Pld	T	G	FG	P
1902–19	Wakefield Trinity	365	57	150	0	436
1919–≥19	York
	Total	365	57	150	0	436
Representative
Years	Team	Pld	T	G	FG	P
≤1905–≥10	Yorkshire
1909	England	2	1	0	0	3
1910	Great Britain	1	0	0	0	0

Thomas "Tommy" Henry Newbould (birth registered fourth ¼ 1880 – 27 October 1964), also known by the nickname of 'Trapper', was an English rugby union, and professional rugby league footballer who played in the 1900s, 1910s, and 1920s. He played representative level rugby union (RU) for Yorkshire, and at club level for Castleford Parish Church RFC and Castleford RUFC (in Castleford, Wakefield), and representative level rugby league (RL) for Great Britain, England and Yorkshire, and at club level for Wakefield Trinity (captain), York and Castleford Rovers as a stand-off or scrum-half.

== Background ==
Thomas 'Trapper' Newbould's birth was registered in Wakefield district, West Riding of Yorkshire, his death aged 83 was registered in Pontefract district, West Riding of Yorkshire, England, and he is buried at Castleford Cemetery, Healdfield Road, Castleford, West Yorkshire, England.

== Playing career ==
=== International honours ===
Newbould won caps for England (RL) while at Wakefield Trinity in 1909 against Australia, and Wales, and won caps for Great Britain (RL) while at Wakefield Trinity on the 1910 Great Britain Lions tour of Australia and New Zealand against Australia, and Australasia.

=== County honours ===
Newbould won caps for Yorkshire (RU) while at Castleford in 1904, and won caps for Yorkshire (RL) while at Wakefield Trinity.

=== Challenge Cup Final appearances ===
Newbould played scrum-half, and scored the first try in Wakefield Trinity's 17–0 victory over Hull F.C. in the 1909 Challenge Cup Final during the 1908–09 season at Headingley, Leeds on Tuesday 20 April 1909, in front of a crowd of 23,587.

=== County Cup Final appearances ===
Newbould played stand-off in Wakefield Trinity's 8–2 victory over Huddersfield in the 1910 Yorkshire Cup Final during the 1910–11 season at Headingley, Leeds on Saturday 3 December 1910.

=== Notable tour matches ===
Newbould played scrum-half in Wakefield Trinity's 5–5 draw with the New Zealand in the tour match at Belle Vue, Wakefield on Wednesday 23 October 1907, and played stand-off, and scored two tries in the 20–13 victory over Australia in the 1908–09 Kangaroo tour of Great Britain match at Belle Vue, Wakefield on Saturday 19 December 1908.

=== Club career ===
Newbould made his début for Wakefield Trinity on Saturday 22 November 1902. During 1921, and aged 41, he joined Castleford Rovers who had initially played in the Lock Lane area of Castleford, but moved to play near Cutsyke Station, where they played Keighley in the first match of the 1921–22 season, he joined along with the coach Fawcett, a former wing/centre for Leeds, Cole from Keighley, Hirst a stand-off/scrum-half for Harrogate RLFC, and Taylor a forward for Yorkshire and Hull FC.

== Contemporaneous Article Extract ==
"Joined Trinity from Castleford R.U.F.C., and his partnership with Harry Slater provided Trinity with one of the best half-back combinations in the league. Like fellow tourist H. Kershaw, he played a prominent part in the 1909 N.U. Cup success and played regularly for Yorkshire County. Newbould played in the 1910 Sydney Test."
