= Harry Beaumont (rugby league) =

English rugby league footballer

Personal information
- Full name: Harry Beaumont
- Born: unknown
- Died: unknown

Playing information
- Position: Forward
Club
| Years | Team | Pld | T | G | FG | P |
|---|---|---|---|---|---|---|
| Oct 1901–09/10 | Wakefield Trinity | 203 | 6 | 0 | 0 | 18 |

Harry Beaumont (birth unknown – death unknown), also known by the nickname of "Dickie", was a professional rugby league footballer who played in the 1900s and 1910s. He played at club level for Wakefield Trinity as a fullback, or later as a forward.

== Playing career ==
=== Challenge Cup Final appearances ===
Dickie Beaumont played as a forward in Wakefield Trinity's 17–0 victory over Hull F.C. in the 1909 Challenge Cup Final during the 1908–09 season at Headingley, Leeds on Tuesday 20 April 1909, in front of a crowd of 23,587.

=== Notable tour matches ===
Dickie Beaumont played as a forward in Wakefield Trinity's 20–13 victory over Australia in the 1908–09 Kangaroo tour of Great Britain match at Belle Vue, Wakefield on Saturday 19 December 1908.
