= Donald Metcalfe =

English rugby union & league footballer and RL coach

Don Metcalfe

Personal information
- Full name: Donald Metcalfe
- Born: 15 July 1932 Wakefield, England
- Died: 7 November 2006 (aged 74) Wakefield, England

Playing information
- Weight: 13 st 0 lb (83 kg)

Rugby union
Club
Years	Team	Pld	T	G	FG	P
1949–51	Sandal RUFC

Rugby league
- Position: Fullback, Centre
Club
Years	Team	Pld	T	G	FG	P
1952–57	Featherstone Rovers	149	54	1	0	164
1957–68	Wakefield Trinity	212	33	0	0	99
	Total	361	87	1	0	263
Representative
Years	Team	Pld	T	G	FG	P
1955–57	Yorkshire	≥2

Coaching information
Club
Years	Team	Gms	W	D	L	W%
c. 1967	Keighley
- Relatives: James Metcalfe (grandfather); Ernest Bennett (maternal grandfather); Tom Bennett (great grandfather); Stan Smith (uncle)

Donald "Don" Metcalfe (15 July 1932 – 7 November 2006) was an English rugby union, and professional rugby league footballer who played in the 1950s and 1960s, and coached rugby league in the 1960s. He played club level rugby union (RU) for Sandal RUFC, and representative level rugby league (RL) for England (Under-21s), and Yorkshire (captain), and at club level for Featherstone Rovers (captain), and Wakefield Trinity, as a fullback or centre, and coached at club level for Keighley.

== Background ==
Donald Metcalfe was born in Wakefield, West Riding of Yorkshire, England, he was a mathematics lecturer at Wakefield College, and he died aged 74 in Wakefield, West Yorkshire, England.

== Playing career ==
=== International honours ===
Don Metcalfe won a cap(s) for England (Under-21s) during the 1951–52 season.

=== County honours ===
Don Metcalfe won caps, and was captain for Yorkshire while at Featherstone Rovers; during the 1955–56 season against Cumberland, and during the 1956–57 season against Lancashire.

=== Challenge Cup Final appearances ===
Don Metcalfe played at centre in Featherstone Rovers' 10–18 defeat by Workington Town in the 1951–52 Challenge Cup Final during the 1951–52 season at Wembley Stadium, London on Saturday 19 April 1952, in front of a crowd of 72,093.

=== County Cup Final appearances ===
Don Metcalfe played at centre, and scored three tries in Wakefield Trinity's 20–24 defeat by Leeds in the 1958 Yorkshire Cup Final during the 1958–59 season at Odsal Stadium, Bradford on Saturday 18 October 1958, played fullback in the 16–10 victory over Huddersfield in the 1960 Yorkshire Cup Final during the 1960–61 season at Headingley, Leeds on Saturday 29 October 1960, and played fullback in the 18–2 victory over Leeds in the 1964 Yorkshire Cup Final during the 1964–65 season at Fartown Ground, Huddersfield on Saturday 31 October 1964.

=== Club career ===
Don Metcalfe made his début for Featherstone Rovers, and scored a try against Hull Kingston Rovers on Saturday 2 February 1952, he played his last match for Featherstone Rovers during the 1956–57 season, he made his début for Wakefield Trinity during April 1957, he played his last match for Wakefield Trinity during the 1968–69 season.

== Contemporaneous Article Extract ==
"Don Metcalfe (Wakefield T.) who of course, held a berth in Featherstone Rovers' centre before joining Trinity in 1957. This season Don's appearances have been almost equally divided between centre and fullback and his utility qualities have been of great service to Wakefield Trinity in recent months. A local product, formerly with Sandal R.U.F.C. and has represented and captained Yorkshire county."

== Genealogical Information ==
Don Metcalfe joined Wakefield Trinity from Featherstone Rovers in April 1957. His father, J. Metcalfe, had played for Trinity about thirty years earlier, and his grandfathers, J. D. Metcalfe and E. W. Bennett, also served the club. His great-grandfather, T. O. Bennett, was a founder member of the club, a player in its early years and at one time its honorary secretary. Metcalfe was also the nephew of the rugby league footballer and coach Stan Smith.

Sporting positions
Preceded by Harry Street; 1965-1967	Coach Keighley; 1967	Succeeded by Alan Kellett; 1968
