= Daniel Davies (rugby league) =

Welsh rugby league footballer

Personal information
- Full name: Daniel Davies
- Born: Wales
- Died: unknown

Playing information
- Position: Stand-off
Club
Years	Team	Pld	T	G	FG	P
1905–13	Swinton	202	14	0	0	42
Representative
Years	Team	Pld	T	G	FG	P
1906	Other Nationalities	1	0	0		0
1907	Lancashire	1	0	0		0
- Relatives: Dai Davies (brother)

Daniel "Dan" Davies (about 1885 – death unknown) was a Welsh professional rugby league footballer who played in the 1910s. He played at representative level for Other Nationalities, and at club level for Swinton, as a stand-off.

== Rugby league ==
Davies made his debut for Swinton in 1905. He played in the club's defeat in the 1910–11 Lancashire Cup final.

Dan Davies won a cap for Other Nationalities while at Swinton.

== Personal life ==
Dan Davies was the brother of the Llanelli RFC, Wales (RL) Swinton, Wales (soccer), and Bolton Wanderers footballer, David "Dai" Davies.

== Outside of sport ==
Dan Davies served with his brother in the 2nd Salford battalion (Swinton Pals), the 19th Lancashire Fusiliers during World War I, and was discharged due to bronchitis contracted in the trenches.

== Notes ==
Dan Davies played at Swinton in the same era as, but he was not related to, David B. Davies.
