= Dai Davies (sportsman) =

Welsh rugby union, rugby league, and association footballer

Personal information
- Full name: David Davies
- Born: 12 May 1880 Llanelli, Wales
- Died: 23 June 1944 (aged 64) Manchester, England

Playing information
- Height: 1.78 m (5 ft 10 in)
- Weight: 12 st 2 lb (77 kg)

Rugby union
- Position: Half-backs
Club
Years	Team	Pld	T	G	FG	P
≤1899–99	Llanelli RFC

Rugby league
- Position: Halves
Club
Years	Team	Pld	T	G	FG	P
1899–02	Swinton
1900–02	Salford	43	10	7		44
1910–≥10	Swinton
≤1913–13	Leigh	5	0	0	0	0
	Total	48	10	7	0	44
Representative
Years	Team	Pld	T	G	FG	P
1900–01	Lancashire	3	1			3
1910	Wales	1
Association football career
- Position: Goalkeeper
Senior career*
Years	Team	Apps	(Gls)
1902–10	Bolton Wanderers	123	(0)
International career
1904–08	Wales	3	(0)
- * Club domestic league appearances and goals

David "Dai" Davies (12 May 1880 – 23 June 1944) was a Welsh rugby union, professional rugby league and association footballer who played in the 1890s, 1900s and 1910s. He played club level rugby union (RU) for Llanelli RFC. He played representative level rugby league (RL) for Wales and Lancashire, and at club level for Swinton (two spells), and Leigh, and representative level association football for Wales, and at club level for Bolton Wanderers, as a goalkeeper. Dai Davies is the only person to have appeared in both the rugby league Challenge Cup Final and the association football FA Cup Final, and is one of the very few, perhaps the only, footballer to play for Wales at both international association football and international rugby league.

== Background ==
Davies was born in Llanelli, Wales, and he died in Manchester, England.

== Sports career ==
=== Rugby union: Llanelli ===
Davies was part of the Llanelli team captained by Owen Badger that lost only once in 31 matches in the 1896–97 season; he scored a try in the win over Newport in February 1897 that was described by the Daily Chronicle as being for "the club championship of the United Kingdom".

=== Rugby league: Swinton ===
The Swinton club secretary, J. W. Scholes, had gone to Llaneli to try to encourage the disenchanted Owen Badger to return to Swinton, while there, he saw Dai Davies play for Llaneli RFC, and contracts were signed on a Llanelli shop window. Davies received £20; £5 in advance, and a further £15 on arrival in Swinton. (based on increases in average earnings, this would be approximately £7,380 in 2013)

Davies played, and scored a try in Swinton's 16–8 victory over Salford in the 1900 Challenge Cup Final during the 1899–1900 season at Fallowfield Stadium, Manchester.

=== Association football: Bolton Wanderers ===
Davies joined Bolton Wanderers of the Football League First Division in the summer of 1902, having only attended one Association Football match and never having handled an association ball. Davies was a "tough individual" and in a contemporaneous report it was claimed that he "excelled in the dangerous and difficult task of diving headlong at an incoming forward's feet and whisking the ball away as he curled up and rolled to safety". A later report said that "in his indifference to cuts and bruises he was characteristic of the age he was playing in". At the end of Davies' first season with the Burnden Park club, they were relegated to the Second Division.

A year later, in April 1904, Davies played in goal in Bolton's 0–1 defeat by Manchester City in the FA Cup Final at Crystal Palace, London. Despite being on the losing side, Davies "had a good match" and made a number of fine saves; he was only beaten once, by fellow Welsh international, Billy Meredith.

Bolton returned to the First Division in 1905 for three years, before spending 1908–09 back in the Second Division. In 1909, they again returned to the top flight as Second Division champions, but were again relegated in 1910.

=== Return to rugby league: Swinton ===
Follow Bolton's relegation, Davies returned to rugby league with Swinton in December 1909.

Davies played, and was captain, in Swinton's 3–4 defeat by Oldham in the 1910 Lancashire Cup Final during the 1910–11 season at Wheater's Field, Broughton, Salford on Saturday 3 December 1910.

== International representation ==
Davies won caps for Wales (association football) in 1904 against Scotland (1–1), and Ireland (0–1), and in 1908 against England (1–7) as a half-time substitute for the injured Stoke City goalkeeper Leigh Richmond Roose who was replaced until half-time by defender Charlie Morris. Roose had been injured in the fifteenth minute following a shoulder-charge by Vivian Woodward; Davies was attending the match as a spectator and at half time, with Wales four goals down, the Football Association officials and Woodward, the England captain, allowed Davies to play in goal for the remainder of the match.

He also won a cap for Wales (RL) while at Swinton in the 13–39 defeat by England at Coventry on 10 December 1910.

== Family ==
Davies was the brother of the Swinton rugby league footballer, Daniel "Dan" Davies.

== Outside of sport ==
Davies retired from rugby age 33, and served with his brother in "E" Company (known as the Swinton Pals) of the 2nd Salford battalion, the 16th Lancashire Fusiliers during World War I, spending time in a French hospital due to an illness unrelated to the fighting. Davies organised the sporting activities for the 'Swinton Pals' at their First World War training camp in North Wales. After the war Davies assisted Swinton Park ARLFC.

== Honours ==
Swinton

- Challenge Cup winners: 1900
- Lancashire Cup Finalist: 1911

Bolton Wanderers

- FA Cup Finalists: 1904
- Football League Second Division champions: 1908–09
- Football League Second Division runners-up: 1904–05
