= Benjamin Johnson (rugby league) =

English rugby league footballer

Ben Johnson
Personal information
- Full name: Benjamin W. Johnson
- Born: unknown
- Died: unknown

Playing information
- Position: Wing, Forward
Club
Years	Team	Pld	T	G	FG	P
1912–15	Wakefield Trinity	74	16	11	0	50

Benjamin "Ben" W. Johnson (birth unknown – death unknown) was a professional rugby league footballer who played in the 1910s. He played at club level for Wakefield Trinity, as a wing, or forward. He was permanently disabled during World War I.

== Playing career ==
=== Challenge Cup Final appearances ===
Ben Johnson played on the wing in Wakefield Trinity's 0-6 defeat by Hull F.C. in the 1914 Challenge Cup Final during the 1913–14 season at Thrum Hall, Halifax, in front of a crowd of 19,000.

=== Club career ===
Ben Johnson made his début for Wakefield Trinity during September 1912.
