= James Metcalfe (rugby) =

English rugby footballer

Jimmy Metcalfe
Personal information
- Full name: James Davis Metcalfe
- Born: 2 December 1873; Cockermouth, Cumberland, England
- Died: 12 July 1943 (aged 69); Wakefield, West Riding of Yorkshire, England

Playing information
- Height: 5 ft 11.5 in (1.816 m)
- Weight: 13 st 0 lb (83 kg)

Rugby union
Club
Years	Team	Pld	T	G	FG	P
1890–≥90	Askam RUFC (now Askam ARLFC)
≥1890–≤97	Barnsley RUFC
≤1897–97	Featherstone RUFC
	Total	0	0	0	0	0
Representative
Years	Team	Pld	T	G	FG	P
≤1897–≤97	Yorkshire

Rugby league
- Position: Fullback
Club
Years	Team	Pld	T	G	FG	P
1897–10/11	Wakefield Trinity	374	3	386	0	781
Representative
Years	Team	Pld	T	G	FG	P
1897–99	Yorkshire	5	0	0	0	0
- Relatives: Donald Metcalfe (grandson)

James Davis Metcalfe (2 December 1873 – 12 July 1943) was an English rugby union, and professional rugby league footballer who played in the 1890s, 1900s and 1910s. He played representative level rugby union (RU) for Yorkshire, and at club level for Askam RUFC (now Askam ARLFC), Barnsley RUFC, and Featherstone RUFC, and representative level rugby league (RL) for Yorkshire, and at club level for Wakefield Trinity (captain), as a fullback.

== Playing career ==
=== County Honours ===
Metcalfe was selected for Yorkshire (RU) whilst at Featherstone RUFC during the 1896-7 season, and was selected for Yorkshire County XIII (RL) whilst at Wakefield Trinity during the 1897–98 season and 1898–99 season.

=== Challenge Cup Final appearances ===
Metcalfe played fullback, and scored the conversion in Wakefield Trinity's 17-0 victory over Hull F.C. in the 1909 Challenge Cup Final during the 1908–09 season at Headingley, Leeds on Tuesday 20 April 1909, in front of a crowd of 23,587.

=== County Cup Final appearances ===
Metcalfe played fullback, and scored a goal in Wakefield Trinity's 8-2 victory over Huddersfield in the 1910 Yorkshire Cup Final during the 1910–11 season at Headingley, Leeds on Saturday 3 December 1910.

=== Notable tour matches ===
Metcalfe played fullback, and scored the goal in Wakefield Trinity's 5-5 draw with the New Zealand in the 1907–1908 New Zealand rugby tour of Australia and Great Britain match at Belle Vue, Wakefield on Wednesday 23 October 1907, and played fullback, and scored four goals in the 20-13 victory over Australia in the 1908–09 Kangaroo tour of Great Britain match at Belle Vue, Wakefield on Saturday 19 December 1908.

=== Club career ===
Metcalfe made his début for Wakefield Trinity during September 1897, he played his last match for Wakefield Trinity during the 1910–11 season.

== Contemporaneous Article Extract ==
"James Metcalfe - Of the many fine players who figured in Trinity's ranks in the early N.U. days was one who gave outstanding service to the club and in whom the players could always have supreme confidence on the last line of defence. Jimmy Metcalfe soon won recognition as one of the finest full-backs in the country. Born in Cumberland, Jimmy's early football was with Askham-in-Furness (sic Askam-in-Furness), with whom he started in 1890 under R.U. rules. His first club in Yorkshire was Barnsley R.U. and thence to Featherstone. Whilst there, in season 1896-7, he played twice for North v. South - these being R.U. trial matches - and in that season too he figured in all Yorkshire's R.U. county games. It was later - but still in 1897 - that he turned to the Northern Union code and joined Trinity. Here his distinctions were continued and he was a member of the Yorkshire N.U. side which won the County Championship of 1897-8 and again in 1898-9. We can hardly do justice to his fine career in what must necessarily be a short account, but mention must be made of the fact that he played in Trinity's successful Cup Final at Headingley, Leeds in 1909, when he was thirty-six years old. And that was not the end. He did not cease to play until 1911 and, in his last match for Trinity gave a final display of his goal-kicking ability by adding three to his wonderful record. Jimmy's record of kicking eleven goals in a match has been equalled twice, but never extended. He set up the record on April 6, 1909, against Bramley at Belle Vue. Trinity's score was 11-15-67 to 2-2-10."

== Personal life ==
Metcalfe was the father of the rugby league stand-off who played in the 1920s and 1930s for Wakefield Trinity; James Metcalfe Junior, and was the paternal grandfather of the rugby league footballer; Donald "Don" Metcalfe.
