= Billy Beattie =

Scottish rugby league footballer

Personal information
- Full name: William Lindsay Beattie
- Born: c. 1889; Ballater, Aberdeenshire, Scotland
- Died: 27 January 1917 (aged 27–28); Western Front

Playing information
- Position: Forward
Club
Years	Team	Pld	T	G	FG	P
1911–14	Wakefield Trinity	90	7	6	0	33

William Lindsay Beattie (c. 1889 – 27 January 1917) was a Scottish professional rugby league footballer who played in the 1910s. He played at club level for Wakefield Trinity (captain), as a forward, and was invited to join the 1914 Great Britain Lions tour of Australia and New Zealand, but declined due to business reasons. Beattie served as a commissioned officer with the Border Regiment (initially in the 10th (service) battalion), and latterly in the 1st battalion (ex 34th Foot), and was killed on the Western Front in 1917 during World War I.

== Playing career ==
=== Challenge Cup Final appearances ===
Billy Beattie played as a forward in Wakefield Trinity's 0–6 defeat by Hull F.C. in the 1914 Challenge Cup Final during the 1913–14 season at Thrum Hall, Halifax, in front of a crowd of 19,000.

=== Club career ===
Billy Beattie made his début for Wakefield Trinity during December 1911, and he played his last match for Wakefield Trinity during October 1914.
