= Steve Darmody =

Australia international rugby league footballer

Personal information
- Full name: Stephen James Darmody
- Born: 12 October 1890 Queanbeyan, New South Wales, Australia
- Died: 8 April 1969 (aged 78) Scotland, United Kingdom

Playing information
- Position: Wing, Centre, Loose forward
Club
Years	Team	Pld	T	G	FG	P
1911–12	South Sydney	21	6	22		62
1912–14	Hull FC	89
	Total	110	6	22	0	62
Representative
Years	Team	Pld	T	G	FG	P
1911–12	Australia
- As of 15 Jul 2021
- Military career
- Allegiance: United Kingdom
- Branch: British Army
- Service years: 1914–18
- Unit: Royal Army Service Corps
- Conflicts: World War I

Steve Darmody (1890–1969) was a pioneer Australian who saw active service in the British army in World War I. He had been an Australian national representative rugby league player and toured with the Australian national team on their 1911–12 Kangaroo tour of Great Britain.

== Career ==
Darmody middle right with fellow Aussies Devereux & Gilbert in Hull 1914

A promising hurdler in his youth, Darmody joined the South Sydney Club in 1910 initially as a goal-kicking winger. He was chosen for the 1911–12 Kangaroo tour of Great Britain as versatile forward. He played in six minor matches on the tour, kicking nine goals.

Following the tour, he stayed in England and along with Herb Gilbert and Jim Devereux he joined Hull FC for whom he made 89 appearances between 1912 and 1914. Alongside Gilbert and Devereux, Darmody played as a forward in Hull FC's 6–0 victory over Wakefield Trinity in the 1914 Challenge Cup Final during the 1913–14 season at Thrum Hall, Halifax, in front of a crowd of 19,000.

== War service ==
At the outbreak of World War I, Darmody enlisted in the British Army. He saw service in Flanders as a despatch rider for the Royal Army Service Corps. His foot was mangled in a machinery accident early in the war resulting in the loss of his foot. He had an artificial limb fitted and then re-enlisted.

The Hull club later played a testimonial match for Darmody. In 1921, when the airship R38 split in two over the River Humber and fell into the shallow estuary, Darmody searched through the rubble for survivors and was called to give evidence at the coronial inquest.

After the war he ran a motorcycle business in Hull and lived out his later life in Scotland.

== Sources ==
- Whiticker, Alan & Hudson, Glen (2006) The Encyclopedia of Rugby League Players, Gavin Allen Publishing, Sydney
