= 1908–09 Challenge Cup =

Rugby league competition

- Duration: 6 rounds
- Highest attendance: 23,587
- Winners: Wakefield Trinity
- Runners-up: Hull F.C.

The 1908–09 Challenge Cup was the 13th staging of rugby league's oldest knockout competition, the Challenge Cup.

The cup was won by Wakefield Trinity who beat Hull F.C. 17-0 at Headingley, Leeds on 24 April 1909 in front of a crowd of 23,587. This was the first time Wakefield Trinity had won the cup as well as the club's first appearance in the final.

Before the competition proper started in February 1909, a three round qualifying competition had been held in December 1908 and January 1909, to whittle 32 clubs down to five to join the 26 senior clubs who were exempt from the qualifying rounds. The 32 clubs attempting to qualify included junior teams and most of the newly formed Welsh senior teams who were in their first season in the Northern Union.

== First round ==
The first round draw was made on 21 January 1909 with the ties played on 27 February 1909.

Challenge Cup first round
Home	Score	Away
Barrow	36–0	Barrow St.George's (Note: Barrow St George's and Widnes were drawn as the home teams but under the competition rules a team drawn at home could cede ground advantage to their opponents.)
Beverley	7–2	Ebbw Vale
Bradford Northern	3–13	Wakefield Trinity
Bramley	13–23	Broughton Rangers
Halifax	15–8	St Helens
Huddersfield	25–2	Widnes
Hunslet	25–5	Mid-Rhondda
Leigh	6–5	Batley
Normanton	10–20	Hull FC
Oldham	8–7	Hull Kingston Rovers
Pemberton Rovers	6–41	Keighley
Rochdale Hornets	3–3	Swinton
Runcorn	23–5	Egremont
Salford	28–0	Dewsbury
Warrington	3–5	Leeds
Wigan	20–7	York

The single drawn match between Swinton and Rochdale was replayed on 3 March with Swinton winning 3–0.

== Second round ==
The draw for the second round was made on 2 March with the ties played on 13 March.

Challenge Cup second round
Home	Score	Away
Broughton Rangers	0–4	Salford
Halifax	53–2	Beverley
Huddersfield	34–3	Barrow
Hunslet	15–9	Leeds
Leigh	3–9	Wakefield Trinity
Runcorn	9–11	Hull FC
Swinton	3–3	Oldham
Wigan	47–0	Keighley

Swinton were, again, involved in the only drawn tie, but this time they lost the replay 17–3 to Oldham on 16 March.

== Third round ==
The third round produced one all-Yorkshire tie and three Lancashire v Yorkshire ties when the draw was made on 16 March, the ties to be played on 27 March.

Challenge Cup third round
Home	Score	Away
Huddersfield	10–10	Wigan
Oldham	6–13	Hull F.C.
Salford	7–13	Halifax
Wakefield Trinity	19–0	Hunslet

The replayed tie was played on 31 March with Wigan prevailing 16–3.

== Semi-finals ==
The semi-final games were played at neutral venues on 10 April, the draw being made on 29 March.

Challenge Cup semi-finals
Team one	Score	Team two	Venue
Halifax	4–10	Hull F.C.	Fartown, Huddersfield
Wigan	2–14	Wakefield Trinity	Wheater's Field, Broughton

== Final ==
The final was played at Leeds' Headingley stadium on Saturday 24 April 1909. The official attendance was given as 23,587 but several commentators assessed the attendance as nearer 30,000.

24 April 1909
15:30 GMT (UTC±00:00)

Wakefield Trinity	17 – 0	Hull
Tries: Newbould, Crosland, Bennett (2), Simpson; Goals: Metcalfe	Report

Headingley, Leeds
Attendance: 23,587
Referee: E. H. Smirke (Wigan)

The teams as pictured in the Leeds Mercury on the day of the final.

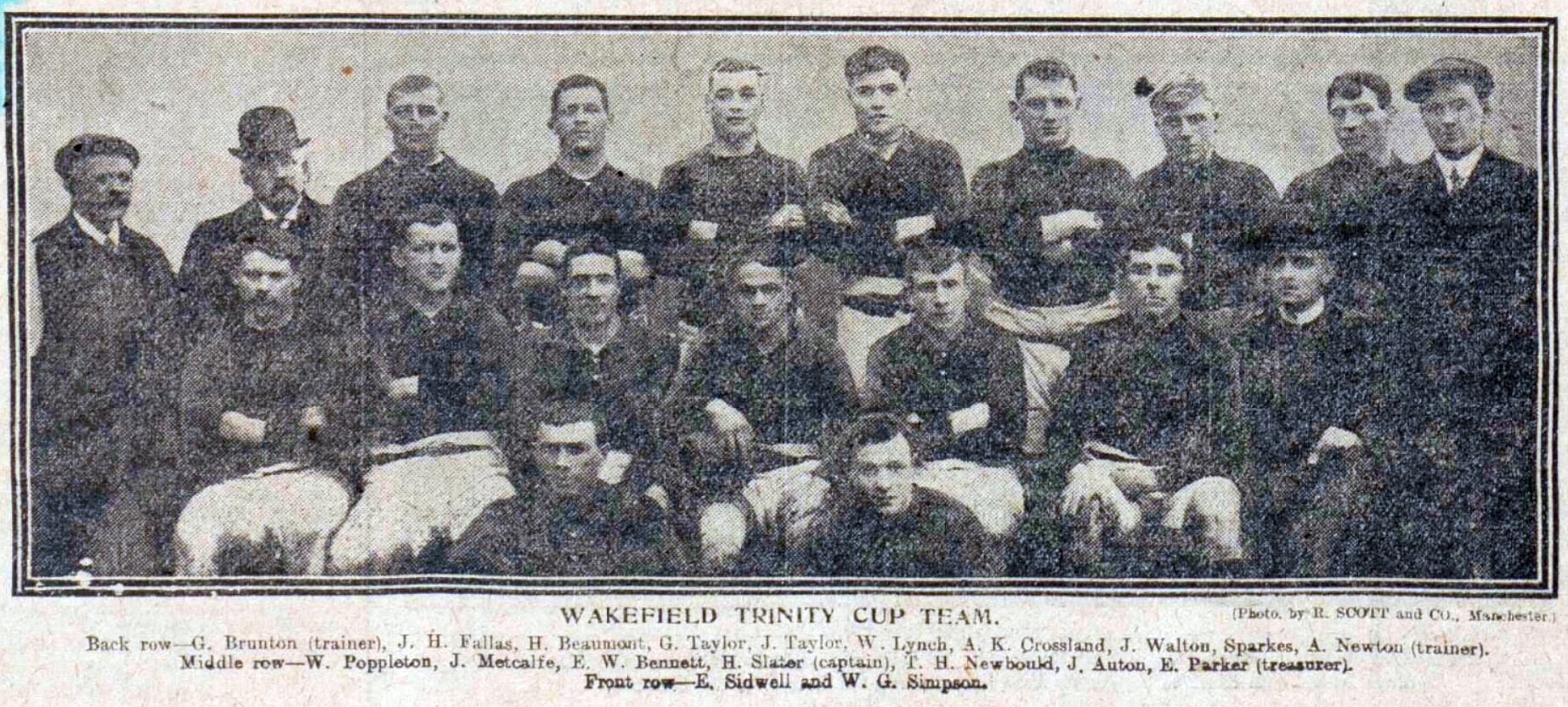
Wakefield Trinity

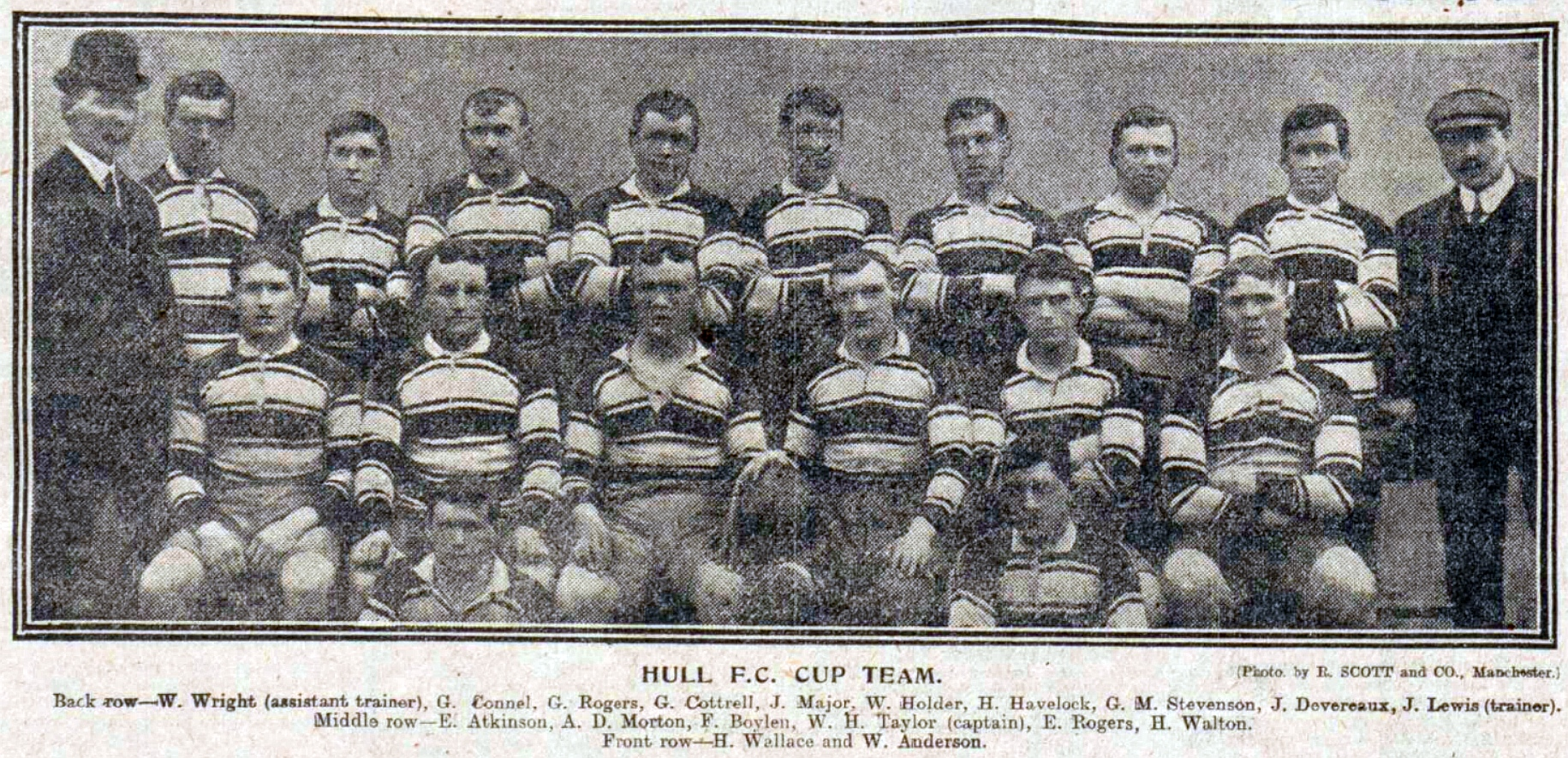
Hull F.C.

Challenge Cup Final teams
Wakefield Trinity	Number	Hull F.C.
Fullback
Jimmy Metcalfe	1	Harry Taylor
Threequarter backs
Ernest Bennett	2	J. Dechan
Ezra Sidwell	3	G. Connell
Billy Lynch	4	George Cottrell
William Simpson	5	E. Rogers
Halfbacks
Tommy Newbould	6	Harry Wallace
Harry Slater	7	Billie Anderson
Forwards
Nealy Crosland	8	Tom Herridge
James Auton	9	William Holder
Joseph Taylor	10	Frank Boylen
Harry Beaumont	11	S. Britton
Jack Walton	12	Harry Havelock
Herbert Kershaw	13	W. J. Carroll

== See also ==
1908–09 Northern Rugby Football Union season
