= William J. Millican =

William John Millican
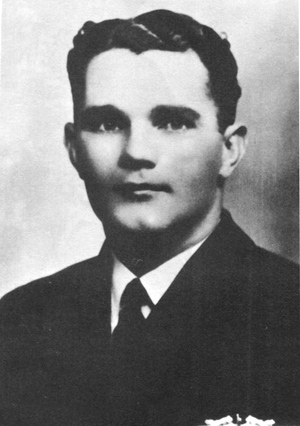
- Born: April 24, 1904; New York City, US
- Died: October 17, 1944 (aged 40); USS Escolar, Sea of Japan
- Alma mater: United States Naval Academy
- Spouse: Sara Elizabeth Stevens (m.1936)
- Children: 1
- Military career
- Allegiance: United States
- Branch: United States Navy
- Service years: 1928–1944
- Rank: Commander
- Nickname: "Moke"
- Service number: 062082
- Commands: USS S-18 (SS-123); USS Thresher (SS-200); USS Escolar (SS-294)
- Awards: Navy Cross (2)

William John Millican (April 24, 1904 – November 13, 1944) was a decorated submarine commander in the United States Navy during World War II. Commander Millican was twice awarded the Navy Cross, but was presumed killed in action when the submarine he was commanding, the USS Escolar, was overdue and presumed lost.

== Early life ==
Millican was born in 1904 to William J. Millican Sr. and Ellen Theresa Millican (née O’Shea) in Brooklyn, New York. His father was a Boston native and his mother was in Irish immigrant from New Ross, Wexford County, Ireland. Millican spent his first years in Brooklyn, attending Public School 153 and St. Brendan's parochial school. Around 1915 the Millican family moved to Norwalk, Connecticut, north of New York City.

Millican received his appointment from Connecticut to The United States Naval Academy in Annapolis, Maryland, on June 17, 1924. This was the first class to enter under the reduced appointee law following the Washington Naval Conference, designed to reduce the size of the navies of United States, Japan, China, France, Britain, Italy, Belgium, Netherlands, and Portugal. Millican was very active in sports at the naval academy. He was an Annapolis all-time letterwinner in the 1925 and 1926 football seasons. Millican, quarterback, was well known for his speed on the field, allowing him to play in two Army–Navy Games. This included playing as part of the backfield in the storied 1926 Army–Navy Game. Besides football, he played baseball, and was also an active boxer. Millican graduated from Annapolis on June 7, 1928, and was commissioned as an ensign in the United States Navy.

== Junior officer ==
Millican reported for his first assignment in the navy aboard the USS Arizona (BB-39) on September 3, 1928. The next year he was transferred to the USS Nevada (BB-36) and was promoted to lieutenant, junior grade in the summer of 1931. In January 1932, Millican reported to the Submarine Base at New London, Connecticut, for a course on submarine instruction. On June 21, 1932, after finishing the submarine course, Millican reported for his first submarine assignment aboard the USS S-10 (SS-115). The following year, LTJG Millican reported for duty aboard the USS R-4 (SS-81). On January 17, 1935, he was transferred to the USS S-15 (SS-120).

On June 27, Millican was detached from the S-15 and returned to Annapolis to become qualified to command submarines. In 1936, while taking an engineering course at the Postgraduate School in Annapolis, Millican was promoted to lieutenant. On June 2, 1936, Millican married Sara Elizabeth Stevens at the U.S. Naval Academy Chapel. In March 1937 the Millicans had a daughter, Sandra. In 1938, Millican completed a chemical warfare course at Washington Navy Yard. On June 19, 1938, Millican arrived in Honolulu aboard the SS Lurline, and joined the crew of the USS S-29 (SS-134). On May 31, 1939, Millican took command of the USS S-18 (SS-123).

== World War II ==
In September 1941, the USS S-18 (SS-123) was sent to the United States west coast. After the attack on Pearl Harbor, the S-18 departed her base Bremerton on January 12, 1942, to patrol the Aleutian Islands on her first war patrol. Millican conducted a second and third war patrol in command of the S-18. However, all three war patrols were uneventful, and no enemy vessels were sighted. After the completion of the third war patrol on March 27, 1942, LCDR James H. Newsome took command of the S-18.

In June 1942, Millican was promoted to lieutenant commander and took command of the USS Thresher (SS-200). On June 26, 1942, the USS Thresher, under command of Millican, commenced her fourth war patrol, patrolling the waters between the Palau and the Marshall Islands. On 6 July, Millican received the chance he didn't have on his first three war patrols: an enemy tanker was sighted entering the channel to the Maloelap Atoll. Millican fired two stern shots, one struck the stern, the ship was beached or began to slowly sink. Afterward, the USS Thresher was attacked by aircraft, but without any damage.

On July 9, 1942, the USS Thresher was near the Kwajalein Atoll when it identified a destroyer tender, the Shinsho Maru. Millican fired two torpedoes, both scoring a hit causing the ship to explode. The anti-submarine response was intense, the Japanese responded with aerial bombing, depth charges, and grappling hooks. The USS Thresher was heavily depth charged, some even landing directly on the deck of the boat and rolling off. The damage from the depth charges caused an air leak revealing its location and making the Thresher easily targeted. The USS Thresher was caught by a large grappling hook, but was able to maneuver itself free and slip away. This incident was dramatized in the 1957 TV series, The Silent Service, titled "The End of the Line." The Millican had some other enemy encounters before ending the USS Thresher's war patrol at Fremantle, Australia, as the Thresher had been assigned to the Southwest Pacific Submarine Forces. On 15 September 1942 Millican was given the temporary rank of commander.

Millican conducted two more war patrols in command of the USS Thresher, ending his sixth war patrol on March 10, 1943. On February 4, 1943, Millican was awarded his first Navy Cross for his actions commanding the USS Thresher on her fourth and fifth war patrols. On his sixth war patrol, Millican was credited with sinking 26,000 tons of enemy shipping and damaging an additional 11,000 tons. Millican was awarded a golden star in lieu of a second Navy Cross for his success in the USS Thresher's sixth war patrol.

On 2 June 1944 Millican took command of the newly commissioned USS Escolar (SS-294). On September 18, 1944, the USS Escolar finished training based at Pearl Harbor and put out to sea on her first war patrol. After topping off fuel at Midway, she joined the USS Croaker and the USS Perch (SS-313) for a coordinated war patrol in the Yellow Sea which she directed. Her last communication was with Perth on October 17; she was never heard from again. Since Japanese records consulted after the war show no antisubmarine action at that time in the area where Escolar is believed to have been, it is assumed that she struck a mine and sank with all hands.

== Memory ==
Millican Field, a baseball field at Hickam Air Force Base, was named in his honor. On April 16, 1952, a plaque at the field was presented by Admiral Charles Momsen, the inventor of the Momsen lung. While Millican's body was never recovered, he is listed on a memorial in the Manila American Cemetery and Memorial, in the Philippines.
