= James Auton =

English rugby league footballer

- Born: 28 September 1879 Hartlepool district, England
- Died: 22 May 1924 (aged 44) Salford district, England

Rugby union career
- Position: Three-quarters
Senior career
Years	Team	Apps	(Points)
≤1904	West Hartlepool R.F.C.		
- Rugby league career

Playing information
- Position: Forward
Club
Years	Team	Pld	T	G	FG	P
Dec 1904–12/13	Wakefield Trinity	231	26	0	0	78

James Auton (28 September 1879 – 22 May 1924) was an English rugby union, and professional rugby league footballer who played in the 1900s and 1910s. He played club level rugby union (RU) for West Hartlepool R.F.C., in the three-quarters, and club level rugby league (RL) for Wakefield Trinity, in the three-quarters, and later as a forward.

== Background ==
James Auton was born in Hartlepool, County Durham, England, and he died aged 44 in Salford, Lancashire, England.

== Playing career ==
=== Challenge Cup Final appearances ===
James Auton played as a forward in Wakefield Trinity's 17–0 victory over Hull F.C. in the 1909 Challenge Cup Final during the 1908–09 season at Headingley, Leeds on Tuesday 20 April 1909, in front of a crowd of 23,587.

=== County Cup Final appearances ===
James Auton played as a forward in Wakefield Trinity's 8–2 victory over Huddersfield in the 1910 Yorkshire Cup Final during the 1910–11 season at Headingley, Leeds on Saturday 3 December 1910.
