= 1910–11 Lancashire Cup =

- Structure: Regional knockout competition
- Teams: 12
- Winners: Oldham
- Runners-up: Swinton

The 1910 Lancashire Cup was the sixth year of the regional rugby league competition and once again a previous winner captured the trophy. The cup was won by Oldham who beat Swinton in the final at Wheater's Field, Broughton, Salford, by a score of 4–3. The attendance at the final was 14,000 and receipts £418.

== Background ==
For the fourth year in succession the same 12 clubs entered and four clubs awarded byes in the first round.

== Competition and results ==
=== Round 1 ===
Involved 4 matches (with four byes) and 12 clubs

Game No	Fixture date	Home team	Score	Away team	Venue	Att	Rec	Notes	Ref
1	Sat 22 October 1910	Barrow	17–11	Leigh	Cavendish Park				
3	Sat 22 October 1910	St. Helens	5-11	Rochdale Hornets	Knowsley Road				
4	Sat 22 October 1910	Wigan	6-10	Widnes Vikings	Central Park				
5		Swinton		bye					
6		Warrington		bye					
7		Salford		bye					
8		Oldham		bye					

=== Round 2 – quarterfinals ===
Game No	Fixture date	Home team	Score	Away team	Venue	Att	Rec	Notes	Ref
1	Sat 5 November 1910	Barrow	0-0	Rochdale Hornets	Cavendish Park				
2	Sat 5 November 1910	Broughton Rangers	2-10	Swinton	Wheater's Field				
3	Sat 5 November 1910	Warrington	14-5	Salford	Wilderspool				
4	Sat 5 November 1910	Widnes Vikings	10-13	Oldham	Naughton Park				
1	Tue 8 November 1910	Rochdale Hornets	14-7	Barrow	Athletic Grounds				

=== Round 3 – semifinals ===
Game No	Fixture date	Home team	Score	Away team	Venue	Att	Rec	Notes	Ref
1	Sat 19 November 1910	Rochdale Hornets	6-16	Oldham	Athletic Grounds				
2	Sat 19 November 1910	Swinton	10-0	Warrington	Chorley Road ground				

=== Final ===
Game No	Fixture date	Home team	Score	Away team	Venue	Att	Rec	Notes	Ref
	Saturday 3 December 1910	Oldham	4-3	Swinton	Wheater's Field	14,000	£418	1	

==== Teams and scorers ====
Oldham	No.	Swinton
	Teams	
Alf Wood	1	Eddie Griffiths
George Smith	2	Tommy Gartrell
Sid Deane	3	Albert Valentine
George Cook	4	Jack Parker
Billy Dixon	5	Albert Morris
Tom White	6	Jimmy Fairhurst
EA Anlezark	7	Dai Davies (c)
Jim Wright	8	Jim Blears
Joe Ferguson	9	Dan Davies
Arthur Smith	10	Bill Preston
Billy Jardine	11	Jack Bailey
Tom McCabe	12	David B. Davies
Albert Avery	13	Tom McVeigh
4	score	3
4	HT	3
	Scorers	
	Tries	
	T	Tommy Gartrell (1)
	T	
	Goals	
Alf Wood	G	
Joe Ferguson	G	
	Drop Goals	
Joe Ferguson	DG	
Referee		

Scoring - Try = three (3) points - Goal = two (2) points - Drop goal = two (2) points

=== The road to success ===
First round
Barrow	17
Leigh	11
St. Helens	5
Rochdale Hornets	11
Wigan	6
Widnes Vikings	10
Oldham
bye
Broughton Rangers	11
Runcorn	2
Swinton
bye
Warrington
bye
Salford
bye

Second round
Barrow	0 – 7
Rochdale Hornets	0 – 14
Widnes Vikings	10
Oldham	13
Broughton Rangers	2
Swinton	10
Warrington	14
Salford	5

Semifinals
Rochdale Hornets	6
Oldham	16
Swinton	10
Warrington	0

Final
Oldham	4
Swinton	3

== Notes and comments ==
- 1 Wheater's Field was the home ground of Broughton Rangers with a capacity of 20,000

== See also ==
- 1910–11 Northern Rugby Football Union season
