= George Taylor (rugby league) =

English rugby league footballer

Personal information
- Full name: George G. Taylor

Playing information
- Position: Forward
Club
Years	Team	Pld	T	G	FG	P
1907–19/20	Wakefield Trinity	242	18	80	0	291

George G. Taylor was a professional rugby league footballer who played in the 1900s, 1910s and 1920s. He played at club level for Wakefield Trinity, as a forward.

== Playing career ==
George Taylor made his début for Wakefield Trinity during September 1907.

=== County Cup Final appearances ===
George Taylor played as a forward in Wakefield Trinity's 8-2 victory over Huddersfield in the 1910 Yorkshire Cup Final during the 1910–11 season at Headingley, Leeds on Saturday 3 December 1910.

=== Notable tour matches ===
George Taylor played as a forward in Wakefield Trinity's 20-13 victory over Australia in the 1908–09 Kangaroo tour of Great Britain match at Belle Vue, Wakefield on Saturday 19 December 1908.

=== Testimonial match ===
George Taylor's Testimonial match for Wakefield Trinity took place against Batley at Belle Vue, Wakefield on Saturday 12 February 1921, it was a joint Testimonial match with Herbert Kershaw.
