= Joseph Taylor (rugby league) =

English rugby league footballer

Personal information
- Full name: Joseph Taylor
- Born: South Hiendley, Wakefield, England

Playing information
- Position: Forward
Club
Years	Team	Pld	T	G	FG	P
1906–13	Wakefield Trinity	217	44	5	0	142
Representative
Years	Team	Pld	T	G	FG	P
1907	Yorkshire	3	0	0	0	0

Joseph Taylor was an English professional rugby league footballer who played as a forward in the 1900s and 1910s.

He played at club level for Wakefield Trinity.

== Playing career ==
=== County honours ===
Taylor won cap(s) for Yorkshire while at Wakefield Trinity, including against New Zealand at Belle Vue, Wakefield on Wednesday 18 December 1907.

=== Challenge Cup Final appearances ===
Taylor played as a forward in Wakefield Trinity's 17-0 victory over Hull F.C. in the 1909 Challenge Cup Final during the 1908–09 season at Headingley, Leeds on Tuesday 20 April 1909, in front of a crowd of 23,587.

=== County Cup Final appearances ===
Taylor played as a forward in Wakefield Trinity's 8-2 victory over Huddersfield in the 1910 Yorkshire Cup Final during the 1910–11 season at Headingley, Leeds on Saturday 3 December 1910.

=== Club career ===
Taylor made his début for Wakefield Trinity during January 1906.

=== Novelty Race ===
On Saturday 23 March 1907, Joseph Taylor on his début, took part in a mile foot race for £100 prize money against Oliver Littlewood, of Outwood, the veteran amateur long distance runner. 2,287 people paid for admission with receipts of £54 12s 2d (based on increases in average earnings, this would be approximately £20,390 in 2016). Littlewood started the race bandaged and was to retire after 3/4 of a mile, leaving Taylor untested, as he finished alone amidst great excitement and cheering.
