= 1910–11 Yorkshire Cup =

- Structure: Regional knockout championship
- Teams: 14
- Winners: Wakefield Trinity
- Runners-up: Huddersfield

The 1910–11 Yorkshire Cup was the sixth occasion on which the Yorkshire Cup competition was held.

This year saw a new name on the trophy. Wakefield Trinity won by beating the previous season's winners, Huddersfield by the score of 8–2. The match was played at Headingley, Leeds, now in West Yorkshire. The attendance was 19,000 and receipts were £696. This was Huddersfield's second appearance in what would be seven appearances in eight consecutive finals between 1909 and 1919 (which included four successive victories and six in total.)

== Background ==
The Rugby Football League's Yorkshire Cup competition was a knock-out competition between (mainly professional) rugby league clubs from the county of Yorkshire. The actual area was at times increased to encompass other teams from outside the county such as Newcastle, Mansfield, Coventry (as this season), and even London (in the form of Acton & Willesden. The competition always took place early in the season, in the Autumn, with the final taking place in (or just before) December (The only exception to this was when disruption of the fixture list was caused during, and immediately after, the two World Wars.)

This season Coventry's name was added to the entrants as newcomers to rugby league. This increased the number of entries by one up to a total of fourteen. This in turn resulted in two byes in the first round.

== Competition and results ==
=== Round 1 ===
Involved 6 matches (with two byes) and 14 clubs

Game No	Fixture date	Home team	Score	Away team	Venue	Ref
1	Sat 15 Oct 1910	Batley	4–7	Dewsbury	Mount Pleasant	
2	Sat 15 Oct 1910	Bramley	4–11	Huddersfield	Barley Mow	
3	Sat 15 Oct 1910	Hull	9–6	Leeds	Boulevard	
4	Sat 15 Oct 1910	Hunslet	8–13	Hull Kingston Rovers	Parkside	
5	Sat 15 Oct 1910	Keighley	2–12	Halifax	Lawkholme Lane	
6	Sat 15 Oct 1910	York	9–5	Bradford Northern	Clarence Street	
7		Wakefield Trinity		bye		
8		Coventry		bye		

=== Round 2 – quarterfinals ===
Involved 4 matches and 8 clubs

Game No	Fixture date	Home team	Score	Away team	Venue	Ref
1	Sat 05 Nov 1910	Huddersfield	25–0	Dewsbury	Fartown	
2	Sat 05 Nov 1910	Hull	24–2	York	Boulevard	
3	Sat 05 Nov 1910	Hull Kingston Rovers	10–2	Halifax	Craven Street (off Holderness Road)	
4	Sat 05 Nov 1910	Wakefield Trinity	42–16	Coventry (Note: The first (and only) game played by new club Coventry in the Yorkshire Cup. The next season they transferred to the Lancashire Cup competition)	Belle Vue|	

=== Round 3 – semifinals ===
Involved 2 matches and 4 clubs

Game No	Fixture date	Home team	Score	Away team	Venue	Ref
1	Sat 19 Nov 1910	Huddersfield	12–2	Hull Kingston Rovers	Fartown	
2	Sat 19 Nov 1910	Wakefield Trinity	11–0	Hull	Belle Vue	

=== Final ===
Game No	Fixture date	Home team	Score	Away team	Venue	Att	Rec	Ref
	Saturday 3 December 1910	Wakefield Trinity	8–2	Huddersfield	Headingley (Note: Headingley is the home ground of Leeds RLFC with a capacity of 21,000. The record attendance was 40,175 for a league match between Leeds and Bradford Northern on 21 May 1947.)	19000	696	

==== Teams and scorers ====
Wakefield Trinity	№	Huddersfield
	teams	
Jimmy Metcalfe	1	Jack Bartholomew
Ernest Bennett	2	Albert Rosenfeld
Billy Lynch	3	Edgar Wrigley
Tommy Poynton	4	Harold Wagstaff (c)
Billie Simpson	5	Billy Kitchen
Tommy Newbould	6	Thomas Grey
Ezra Sidwell	7	Jim Davies
Herbert Kershaw	8	Wilfred Ainley
Nealy Crosland	9	Con Byrne
Jack Walton	10	Ben Gronow
James Auton	11	Dougie Clark
George Taylor	12	Willie Mellor
Joe Taylor	13	Clon Sherwood
??	Coach	(??)
8	score	2
5	HT	0
	Scorers	
	Tries	
Billie Simpson (1)	T	
George Taylor (1)	T	
	Goals	
Jimmy Metcalfe (1)	G	Edgar Wrigley (1)
Referee		B. Ennion (Wigan)

Scoring – Try = three (3) points – Goal = two (2) points – Drop goal = two (2) points

=== The road to success ===
First round
Wakefield Trinity
bye
Coventry
bye
Hull	9
Leeds	6
York	9
Bradford Northern	5
Bramley	4
Huddersfield	11
Batley	4
Dewsbury	7
Hunslet	8
Hull Kingston Rovers	13
Keighley	2
Halifax	12

Second round
Wakefield Trinity	42
Coventry	16
Hull	24
York	2
Huddersfield	25
Dewsbury	0
Hull Kingston Rovers	10
Halifax	2

Semifinals
Wakefield Trinity	11
Hull	0
Huddersfield	12
Hull Kingston Rovers	2

Final
Wakefield Trinity	8
Huddersfield	2

== See also ==
- 1910–11 Northern Rugby Football Union season
- Rugby league county cups
