= Jack Harrison (VC) =

British Army officer VC & MC recipient in WW1 & English rugby league footballer

John Harrison
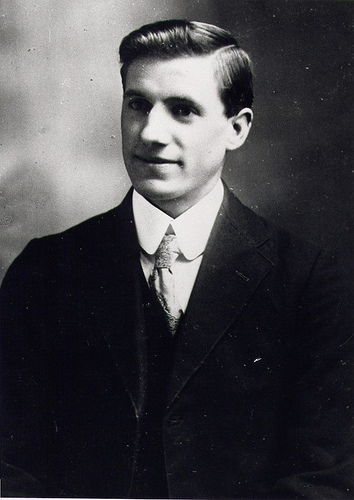
- Born: 12 November 1890; Kingston upon Hull, East Riding of Yorkshire, England
- Died: 3 May 1917 (aged 26); Oppy, France
- Military career
- Allegiance: United Kingdom
- Branch: British Army
- Service years: 1915–1917
- Rank: Second Lieutenant
- Units: The East Yorkshire Regiment
- Conflicts: World War I: Battle of Arras; Capture of Oppy Wood †
- Awards: Victoria Cross; Military Cross
- Other work: Teacher; Rugby league player
- Rugby league career

Playing information
- Position: Wing
Club
Years	Team	Pld	T	G	FG	P
1911–12	York	5	3	0	0	9
1912–16	Hull F.C.	116	106	0	0	318
	Total	121	109	0	0	327

John Harrison VC MC (12 November 1890 – 3 May 1917) was a professional rugby league footballer who played for Hull F.C. He later became a British Army officer, and was the posthumous recipient of the Victoria Cross during the First World War, the highest and most prestigious award for gallantry in the face of the enemy that can be awarded to British and Commonwealth forces.

== Early life ==
Harrison was born in Hull on 12 November 1890. His father was a plater and boilermaker in the Earles Shipyard. After leaving school, Harrison studied at St John's College, York (now York St John University) where he was Rugby club captain and also represented the College at cricket and swimming before becoming a teacher later at Lime Street School in Hull. In York, he caught the attention of the York rugby league club, and played for them five times in 1911–12, scoring three tries.

He returned to Hull in September 1912 and married Lillian on 1 September 1914. He was invited to join Hull F.C. which included Billy Batten, and played his first match on 5 September 1912. In 1913–14 season, he scored a record 52 tries and he went on to score a total of 106 tries in 116 matches for Hull up to 1916. Jack Harrison played on the wing and scored a try in Hull F.C.'s 6–0 victory over Wakefield Trinity in the 1914 Challenge Cup Final during the 1913–14 season at Thrum Hall, Halifax, in front of a crowd of 19,000.

== First World War ==
Not long after the birth of his son, Jackie, and while living at 75 Wharncliffe Street, Hull, Harrison volunteered for the army. He started receiving officer training on 4 November 1915, as a private in the Inns of Court Officer Training Corps. On completion of training, he was commissioned as a probationary temporary second lieutenant in the East Yorkshire Regiment on 5 August 1916, and was posted to 6 Platoon, 11th (Service) Battalion (the Hull Tradesmen). In February 1917 the Hull brigade entered the front line once again and Jack was soon in the thick of the action. On 25 February, Harrison led a patrol into no man's land, and for this action he was awarded the Military Cross (MC). The citation for his MC read:

Temp. 2nd Lt. John Harrison, E. York. R. For conspicuous gallantry and devotion to duty. He handled his platoon with great courage and skill, reached his objective under the most trying conditions, and captured a prisoner. He set a splendid example throughout.

— London Gazette

Oppy Wood, 1917. Evening by John Nash

On 3 May 1917 came the actions that led to his VC, during the Capture of Oppy Wood as part of the Battle of Arras. Ordered, with the rest of his brigade, to attack a wood near Oppy, Pas-de-Calais, his platoon became pinned down by machine gun fire. The citation for his VC describes events in more detail:

T/2nd Lt. John Harrison, M.C., E. York. R.

For most conspicuous bravery and self-sacrifice in an attack.

Owing to darkness and to smoke from the enemy barrage, and from our own, and to the fact that our objective was in a dark wood, it was impossible to see when our barrage had lifted off the enemy front line.

Nevertheless, 2nd Lt. Harrison led his company against the enemy trench under heavy rifle and machine-gun fire, but was repulsed. Reorganising his command as best he could in No Man's Land, he again attacked in darkness under terrific fire, but with no success.

Then, turning round, this gallant officer single-handed made a dash at the machine-gun, hoping to knock out the gun and so save the lives of many of his company.

His self-sacrifice and absolute disregard of danger was an inspiring example to all. (he is reported missing, believed killed.)

— London Gazette

Harrison's body was never found. He is commemorated on the Commonwealth War Graves Commission Arras Memorial.

== Further information ==
Lilian Harrison was presented with his Victoria Cross at Buckingham Palace by King George V in March 1918. The war widow benefitted from a fund raised in Hull to provide for the younger John Harrison’s education. Their son went on to serve as an officer in the Duke of Wellington's West Riding Regiment during the Second World War, and was killed as a captain in the defence of Dunkirk, and is buried in the Dunkirk town cemetery.

Lillian Harrison died on 5 December 1977, and bequeathed Harrison's medals to the East Yorkshire regimental museum in Beverley (now part of the Museum of Prince of Wales's Own Regiment of Yorkshire Museum in Tower St, York).

In 2017, York St John alumnus, Patrick H. A. Neal, released his biography of Harrison, The Heroic Johnsman: The Story of Jack Harrison VC, MC.
