= Ernest Parkin =

English rugby league footballer

Personal information
- Full name: Ernest Parkin
- Born: 1 October 1894; Wakefield, Yorkshire, England
- Died: 1957 (aged 62); Pontefract, Yorkshire, England

Playing information
- Position: Forward
Club
| Years | Team | Pld | T | G | FG | P |
|---|---|---|---|---|---|---|
| 1913–24 | Wakefield Trinity | 151 | 21 | 0 | 0 | 63 |
Representative
| Years | Team | Pld | T | G | FG | P |
| 1922 | Yorkshire | 1 |

Ernest Parkin (1 October 1894 – 1957) was an English professional rugby league footballer who played in the 1910s and 1920s. He played at representative level for Yorkshire, and at club level for Wakefield Trinity, as a forward.

== Playing career ==
Parkin made his début for Wakefield Trinity during October 1913, and he played his last match for Wakefield Trinity during March 1924.

=== County honours ===
Parkin won cap(s) for Yorkshire while at Wakefield Trinity.

=== Challenge Cup Final appearances ===
Parkin played as a forward in Wakefield Trinity's 0-6 defeat by Hull F.C. in the 1914 Challenge Cup Final during the 1913–14 season at Thrum Hall, Halifax, in front of a crowd of 19,000.
