= William Simpson (rugby league) =

English rugby league footballer

Personal information
- Full name: William G. Simpson
- Born: unknown
- Died: unknown

Playing information
- Position: Wing
Club
Years	Team	Pld	T	G	FG	P
1906–14	Wakefield Trinity	182	97	0	0	291

William "Billie"/"Billy"G. Simpson (birth unknown – death unknown) was a professional rugby league footballer who played in the 1900s and 1910s. He played at club level for Wakefield Trinity, as a wing.

== Playing career ==
=== Challenge Cup Final appearances ===
William Simpson played on the wing, and scored a try in Wakefield Trinity's 17-0 victory over Hull F.C. in the 1909 Challenge Cup Final during the 1908–09 season at Headingley, Leeds on Tuesday 20 April 1909, in front of a crowd of 23,587.

=== County Cup Final appearances ===
William Simpson played on the wing, and scored a try in Wakefield Trinity's 8-2 victory over Huddersfield in the 1910 Yorkshire Cup Final during the 1910–11 season at Headingley, Leeds on Saturday 3 December 1910.

=== Notable tour matches ===
William Simpson played on the wing in Wakefield Trinity's 20-13 victory over Australia in the 1908–09 Kangaroo tour of Great Britain match at Belle Vue, Wakefield on Saturday 19 December 1908.

== Club career ==
William Simpson is fifth on Wakefield Trinity's most tries in a season list with 34-tries scored in the 1910-11 season, he is behind; Fred Smith (38-tries in the 1959-60 season, and 37-tries in the 1958-59 season), David Smith (38-tries in the 1973-74 season), and Alan Skene (35-tries in the 1959-60 season).
