= Joe Hammill =

English rugby league footballer

Personal information
- Full name: Joseph Hammill

Playing information
- Position: Forward
Club
Years	Team	Pld	T	G	FG	P
≤1912–14	Dewsbury
1914–17	Hull FC
	Total	0	0	0	0	0

Joseph Hammill (birth unknown – death unknown) was a professional rugby league footballer who played in the 1910s. He played at club level for Dewsbury and Hull FC, as a forward.

== Playing career ==
=== Challenge Cup Final appearances ===
Joe Hammill played as a forward in Dewsbury's 8-5 victory over Oldham in the 1912 Challenge Cup Final during the 1911-12 season at Headingley, Leeds on Saturday 27 April 1912 in front of a crowd of 16,000, and played as a forward in Hull FC's 6-0 victory over Wakefield Trinity in the 1914 Challenge Cup Final during the 1913–14 season at Thrum Hall, Halifax, in front of a crowd of 19,000.
