= USS Escolar =

Submarine of the United States

Coordinates: 33°21′N 122°35′E

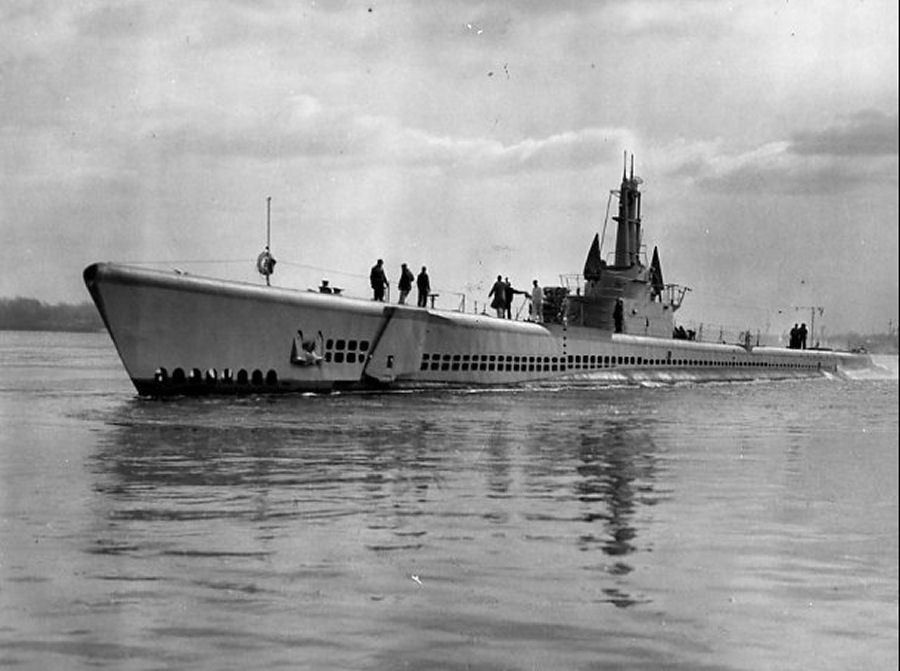
- USS Escolar circa June 1944.

History

United States
- Name: Escolar
- Namesake: Escolar
- Builder: Cramp Shipbuilding Company, Philadelphia, Pennsylvania
- Yard number: 549
- Laid down: 10 June 1942
- Launched: 18 April 1943
- Commissioned: 2 June 1944
- Fate: Probably mined in the Yellow Sea on 17 October 1944

General characteristics
- Class & type: Balao-class diesel-electric submarine
- Displacement: 1,526 long tons (1,550 t) surfaced, 2,424 long tons (2,463 t) submerged
- Length: 311 ft 8 in (95.00 m)
- Beam: 27 ft 3 in (8.31 m)
- Draft: 16 ft 10 in (5.13 m) maximum
- Propulsion: 4 × Fairbanks-Morse Model 38D8-1/8 9-cylinder opposed-piston diesel engines driving electrical generators; 2 × 126-cell Sargo batteries; 4 × high-speed Elliott electric motors with reduction gears; 2 × propellers; 5,400 shp (4.0 MW) surfaced; 2,740 shp (2.04 MW) submerged
- Speed: 20.25 knots (37.50 km/h) surfaced, 8.75 knots (16.21 km/h) submerged
- Range: 11,000 nmi (20,000 km) surfaced at 10 kn (19 km/h) surfaced
- Endurance: 48 hours at 2 kn (3.7 km/h) submerged, 75 days on patrol
- Test depth: 400 ft (120 m)
- Complement: 10 officers, 70–71 enlisted
- Armament: 10 × 21-inch (533 mm) torpedo tubes; 6 forward, 4 aft; 24 torpedoes; 1 × 5-inch (127 mm) / 25 caliber deck gun; Bofors 40 mm and Oerlikon 20 mm cannon

USS Escolar (SS-294), a Balao-class submarine, was the only ship of the United States Navy to be named for the escolar.

== Construction and commissioning ==
Escolar was laid down by the Cramp Shipbuilding Company of Philadelphia, Pennsylvania. She was launched on 18 April 1943, sponsored by Mrs. Emma Stevens Martin Hudgins, wife of J. Bilisoly Hudgins. She was transferred to the Boston Navy Yard in Boston, Massachusetts, after launch and thence to Portsmouth Naval Shipyard in Kittery, Maine, prior to her commissioning on 2 June 1944, Commander William J. "Moke" Millican in command.

== Service history ==
Escolar had her final training for combat at Pearl Harbor, from which she put out for her first war patrol on 18 September 1944. After topping off fuel at Midway Island, she joined Croaker and Perch for a coordinated "wolfpack" patrol in the Yellow Sea. Commander William J. Millican led this coordinated attack group, which was designated "Millican's Marauders."

On 30 September, when Escolar was estimated to be about north of the Bonin Islands, a listening post received a partial message from her:

THIS FROM ESCOLAR X ATTACKED WITH DECK GUN BOAT SIMILAR TO EX-ITALIAN PETER GEORGE FIVE OTYI

Escolar was then forced to break off the transmission and the engagement with the gunboat.

No further transmissions were received by bases from Escolar, but Perch and Croaker recorded intra-ship communications with her until 17 October, when Perch received a routine message from Escolar giving her position and course. She was never heard from again.

Had Escolar ended her patrol on the scheduled date, she would have arrived at Midway Island about 13 November 1944. All attempts to contact Escolar failed, and she was reported on 27 November 1944 as presumed lost.

Information supplied by the Japanese on anti-submarine attacks gives no clue as to the cause of her loss, but the Yellow Sea area is thought to have been mined. Her course as transmitted to Perch does not cross any known Japanese minefields, but positions of mines laid before April 1945 are not precisely known. However, the most likely explanation for her end remains that she detonated a naval mine.

The Imperial Japanese Navy (IJN) Type D Escort Destroyer Number 38 reported having contact with and sinking a US Navy submarine on 19 October 1944 near Escolar's expected position. They "fired about 30 depth charges and then observed a heavy oil slick on the surface and a lot of gear from an enemy submarine floated to the surface." This could be the fate of Escolar as no other US submarines were in the area and no contact was made with Escolar after this.

In 1973 a six-foot (1.8 m)-tall stone memorial was dedicated to Escolar. The memorial is in Charlevoix, Michigan, which is just north of Grand Traverse Bay on Lake Michigan.
