= Ernest Bennett (rugby league) =

English rugby league footballer (1879–1921)

Personal information
- Full name: Ernest Walter Bennett
- Born: 21 August 1879; Wakefield district, England
- Died: 11 August 1921 (aged 41); Filey, England

Playing information
- Position: Wing
Club
Years	Team	Pld	T	G	FG	P
1898–14	Wakefield Trinity	386	184	64	0	679
Representative
Years	Team	Pld	T	G	FG	P
	Yorkshire
- Father: Tom Bennett
- Relatives: Donald Metcalfe (grandson)

Ernest Walter Bennett (21 August 1879 – 11 August 1921) was an English professional rugby league footballer who played as a winger in the 1890s and 1900s.

He played at representative level for Yorkshire, and at club level for Wakefield Trinity.

== Background ==
Ernest Bennett's birth was registered in Wakefield district, West Riding of Yorkshire, England.

== Playing career ==
=== County honours ===
Ernest Bennett won cap(s) for Yorkshire while at Wakefield Trinity.

=== Challenge Cup Final appearances ===
Ernest Bennett played on the wing, and scored a try in Wakefield Trinity's 17-0 victory over Hull F.C. in the 1909 Challenge Cup Final during the 1908–09 season at Headingley, Leeds on Tuesday 20 April 1909, in front of a crowd of 23,587.

=== County Cup Final appearances ===
Ernest Bennett played on the wing in Wakefield Trinity's 8-2 victory over Huddersfield in the 1910 Yorkshire Cup Final during the 1910–11 season at Headingley, Leeds on Saturday 3 December 1910.

=== Notable tour matches ===
Ernest Bennett played on the wing, and scored a try in Wakefield Trinity's 20-13 victory over Australia in the 1908–09 Kangaroo tour of Great Britain match at Belle Vue, Wakefield on Saturday 19 December 1908.

=== Other notable appearances ===
Ernest Bennett played in The Rest's 5-7 defeat by Leeds in the 1901–02 Yorkshire Senior Competition Champions versus The Rest match at Headingley, Leeds on Saturday 19 April 1902.

=== Club career ===
Ernest Bennett made his début for Wakefield Trinity during December 1898.

== Personal life ==
Ernest Bennett was the son of Wakefield Trinity rugby union footballer who played in the 1870s Thomas Oliver Bennett, and the maternal grandfather of Featherstone Rovers and Wakefield Trinity rugby league footballer who played in the 1950s and 1960s, Donald "Don" Metcalfe.
