= Ezra Sidwell =

English rugby league footballer

Personal information
- Full name: Ezra Sidwell
- Born: second ¼ 1885; Wakefield district, England
- Died: fourth ¼ 1949 (aged 64); Wakefield district, England

Playing information
- Position: Centre, Scrum-half
Club
Years	Team	Pld	T	G	FG	P
1904–11/12	Wakefield Trinity	165	47	9	0	159

Ezra Sidwell (second ¼ 1885 – fourth ¼ 1949) was an English professional rugby league footballer who played in the 1900s and 1910s. He played at club level for Wakefield Trinity, as a centre or scrum-half.

== Background ==
Ezra Sidwell's birth was registered in Wakefield district, West Riding of Yorkshire, England, and his death aged 64 was registered in Wakefield district, West Riding of Yorkshire, England.

== Playing career ==
=== Challenge Cup Final appearances ===
Ezra Sidwell played at centre, and scored a try in Wakefield Trinity's 17-0 victory over Hull F.C. in the 1909 Challenge Cup Final during the 1908–09 season at Headingley, Leeds on Tuesday 20 April 1909, in front of a crowd of 23,587.

=== County Cup Final appearances ===
Ezra Sidwell played scrum-half in Wakefield Trinity's 8-2 victory over Huddersfield in the 1910 Yorkshire Cup Final during the 1910–11 season at Headingley, Leeds on Saturday 3 December 1910.

=== Notable tour matches ===
Ezra Sidwell played at centre, and scored a try in Wakefield Trinity's 20-13 victory over Australia in the 1908–09 Kangaroo tour of Great Britain match at Belle Vue, Wakefield on Saturday 19 December 1908.

=== Club career ===
Ezra Sidwell made his début for Wakefield Trinity during December 1904.
