= Thomas Oliver Bennett =

English rugby union player

Thomas Bennett
- Full name: Thomas Oliver Bennett
- Born: 2 April 1852 Wakefield district, England
- Died: 8 August 1905 (aged 53) Wakefield district, England
- Notable relative(s): Ernest Bennett (son); Donald Metcalfe (great grandson)

Rugby union career
Senior career
Years	Team	Apps	(Points)
1873-	Wakefield Trinity		
–	Yorkshire		

Thomas Oliver Bennett (2 April 1852 – 8 August 1905) was an English rugby union footballer who played in the 1870s. He played at representative level for Yorkshire, and at club level for Wakefield Trinity (who were a rugby union club at the time). Prior to Tuesday 27 August 1895, Wakefield Trinity was a rugby union club.

== Background ==
Thomas Bennett's birth was registered in Wakefield district, West Riding of Yorkshire, and his death aged 53 was registered in Wakefield district, West Riding of Yorkshire.

== Playing career ==
Thomas Bennett was a founder member of Wakefield Trinity and played in the club's first ever game in 1873, and he was later an honorary secretary of the club.
