= 1913–14 Northern Rugby Football Union season =

English rugby league competition

- League: Championship
- Teams: 25

1913–14 Season
- Champions: Salford (1st title)
- League Leaders: Huddersfield
- Runners-up: Huddersfield
- Top point-scorer(s): (England) Major Holland ( Huddersfield) (268)
- Top try-scorer(s): (Australia) Albert Rosenfeld ( Huddersfield) (80)

The 1913–14 Northern Rugby Football Union season was the 19th season of rugby league football.

== Season summary ==
Salford won the play-off final 5-3 against Huddersfield to record their first Championship.

Huddersfield ended the regular season with the best record and were trying for their third title in a row. During their campaign, Albert Rosenfeld scored the most tries in a league season (80) for Huddersfield .

The Challenge Cup Winners were Hull F.C. who beat Wakefield Trinity 6-0.

This season saw Hull F.C. pay a then World Record £600 plus £14 per week for Billy Batten, a three-quarter at Hunslet. Jack Harrison set a Hull F.C. club record 52 tries during this season.

Wigan won the Lancashire League, and Huddersfield won the Yorkshire League. Oldham beat Wigan 5–0 to win the Lancashire Cup, and Huddersfield beat Bradford Northern 19–3 to win the Yorkshire County Cup.

At the end of the season, several of the Northern Rugby Football Union's players were selected to go on the 1914 Great Britain Lions tour of Australia and New Zealand.

== Championship ==
| | Team | Pld | W | D | L | PF | PA | Pts | Pct |
|---|---|---|---|---|---|---|---|---|---|
| 1 | Huddersfield | 34 | 28 | 2 | 4 | 830 | 258 | 58 | 85.29 |
| 2 | Salford | 32 | 25 | 1 | 6 | 320 | 140 | 51 | 79.69 |
| 3 | Wigan | 34 | 25 | 2 | 7 | 676 | 252 | 52 | 76.47 |
| 4 | Hull | 34 | 24 | 1 | 9 | 507 | 264 | 49 | 72.06 |
| 5 | Barrow | 30 | 20 | 0 | 10 | 335 | 256 | 40 | 66.66 |
| 6 | Hull Kingston Rovers | 34 | 20 | 2 | 12 | 393 | 298 | 42 | 61.76 |
| 7 | Rochdale Hornets | 34 | 18 | 4 | 12 | 356 | 270 | 40 | 58.83 |
| 8 | Widnes | 32 | 17 | 1 | 14 | 262 | 241 | 35 | 54.69 |
| 9 | Leeds | 34 | 18 | 1 | 15 | 342 | 290 | 37 | 54.42 |
| 10 | Hunslet | 34 | 18 | 1 | 15 | 437 | 397 | 37 | 54.42 |
| 11 | Warrington | 34 | 17 | 2 | 15 | 280 | 332 | 36 | 52.94 |
| 12 | Dewsbury | 36 | 18 | 2 | 16 | 378 | 377 | 38 | 52.78 |
| 13 | Swinton | 30 | 15 | 1 | 14 | 243 | 232 | 31 | 51.66 |
| 14 | Oldham | 34 | 17 | 0 | 17 | 403 | 265 | 34 | 50 |
| 15 | Batley | 32 | 14 | 3 | 15 | 253 | 276 | 31 | 48.43 |
| 16 | Broughton Rangers | 32 | 14 | 0 | 18 | 235 | 264 | 28 | 43.75 |
| 17 | Wakefield Trinity | 34 | 12 | 3 | 19 | 257 | 382 | 27 | 39.71 |
| 18 | Halifax | 32 | 12 | 1 | 19 | 359 | 320 | 25 | 39.06 |
| 19 | St. Helens | 32 | 12 | 1 | 19 | 376 | 440 | 25 | 39.06 |
| 20 | Leigh | 30 | 10 | 0 | 20 | 165 | 329 | 20 | 33.33 |
| 21 | Runcorn | 30 | 10 | 0 | 20 | 165 | 442 | 20 | 33.33 |
| 22 | Keighley | 30 | 9 | 1 | 20 | 159 | 385 | 19 | 31.64 |
| 23 | Bramley | 30 | 7 | 0 | 23 | 163 | 464 | 14 | 23.33 |
| 24 | Bradford Northern | 34 | 7 | 1 | 26 | 223 | 492 | 15 | 22.06 |
| 25 | York | 34 | 6 | 0 | 28 | 237 | 688 | 12 | 17.65 |

=== Championship play-off ===
Semi-finals
1 | Huddersfield | 23
4 | Hull | 5
2 | Salford | 16
3 | Wigan | 5

Championship final
Huddersfield | 3
Salford | 5

== Challenge Cup ==
A Hull team featuring Billy Batten and Jim Devereux defeated Wakefield Trinity 6-0. This was Hull's first Challenge Cup win in their fourth Final appearance.

Hull: 6

Tries: Jack Harrison, Alfred Francis

Wakefield Trinity: 0

Half-time: 0-0

Attendance: 19,000 (at Thrum Hall, Halifax)

Teams:

Hull: Rogers, Jack Harrison, Billy Batten, Herb Gilbert, Alfred Francis, Jim Devereux, Billie Anderson, Tom Herridge, William Holder, Dick Taylor, Percy Oldham, Joe Hammill, Steve Darmody

Wakefield Trinity: Leonard Land, Benjamin Johnson, William "Billy" Lynch, Thomas "Tommy" Poynton, Bruce Howarth, Jonty Parkin, William Milligan/Millican, Albert Dixon, Arthur Kenealy "Nealy" Crosland, William Beattie, Herbert Kershaw, Ernest Parkin, Arthur Burton

== Sources ==
- 1913-14 Rugby Football League season at wigan.rlfans.com
- The Challenge Cup at The Rugby Football League website
