= John Walton (translator) =

John Walton, also John Capellanus (fl. 1410) was an English Augustinian canon, known as a poet and translator.

== Works ==
Walton appears to have been a canon of Osney Abbey in 1410, when he completed his verse-translation of the De Consolatione Philosophiæ of Boethius. This work was undertaken at the request of Elizabeth Berkeley; she, possibly, was the daughter of Thomas de Berkeley, 5th Baron Berkeley, patron of John de Trevisa, who married Richard de Beauchamp, 13th Earl of Warwick. Boethius's work had already been translated into English prose as Geoffrey Chaucer's Boece, and Walton makes use of Chaucer's version. He refers to Chaucer as "the floure of rethoryk", and also mentions John Gower.

Ten manuscripts of Walton's translation are extant. Walton's book was printed in 1525. Extracts from Walton's poem were printed in Wülker's Altenglisches Lesebuch (ii. 56), in Skeat's edition of Chaucer (vol. ii. pp. xvi–xvii), and in the Athenæum (1892, i. 565).

== Identification ==
Walton has been confused by Thomas Tanner with John Walton, archbishop of Dublin, with John de Waltham, prior of Drax and subdean of York, and with others of similar names.

== Notes ==
Attribution

This article incorporates text from a publication now in the public domain: Lee, Sidney, ed. (1899). "Walton, John (fl.1410)". Dictionary of National Biography. Vol. 59. London: Smith, Elder & Co.
