= USS S-18 =

S-class submarine of the United States

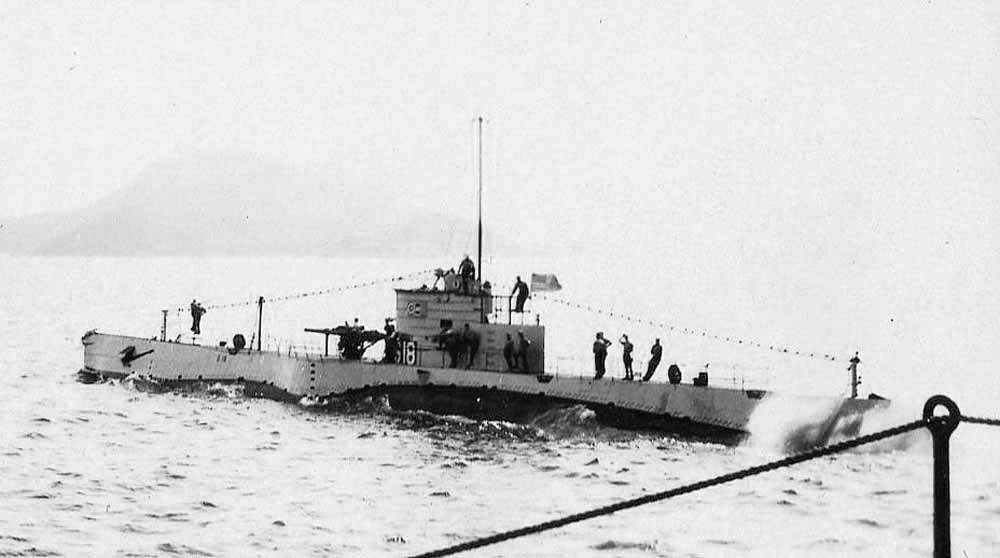
- USS S-18 (SS-123) taking a towline off Taboga Island, in the Bay of Panama, in the 1920s

History

United States
- Name: S-18
- Builder: Fore River Shipyard, Quincy, Massachusetts
- Cost: $677,622.76 (hull and machinery)
- Laid down: 15 August 1918
- Launched: 29 April 1920
- Sponsored by: Miss Virginia Belle Johnson
- Commissioned: 3 April 1924
- Decommissioned: 29 October 1945
- Stricken: 13 November 1945
- Identification: Hull symbol: SS-123; Call sign: NINF
- Fate: Sold for scrapping, 9 November 1946

General characteristics
- Class & type: S-18-class submarine
- Displacement: 930 long tons (945 t) surfaced; 1,094 long tons (1,112 t) submerged
- Length: 219 feet 3 inches (66.83 m)
- Beam: 20 ft 8 in (6.30 m)
- Draft: 17 ft 3 in (5.26 m)
- Installed power: 1,200 brake horsepower (895 kW) diesel; 2,375 hp (1,771 kW) electric
- Propulsion: 2 × NELSECO diesel engines; 2 × Ridgway Dynamo & Engine Company electric motors; 2 × 60-cell batteries; 2 × Propellers
- Speed: 14.5 knots (26.9 km/h; 16.7 mph) surfaced; 11 kn (20 km/h; 13 mph) submerged
- Range: 3,420 nmi (6,330 km; 3,940 mi) at 6.5 kn (12.0 km/h; 7.5 mph) surfaced; 8,950 nmi (16,580 km; 10,300 mi) at 9.5 kn (17.6 km/h; 10.9 mph) surfaced with fuel in main ballast tanks; 20 hours at 5 knots (9 km/h; 6 mph) submerged
- Test depth: 200 ft (61 m)
- Capacity: 41,921 US gallons (158,690 L; 34,907 imp gal) fuel oil
- Complement: 4 officers; 34 enlisted
- Armament: 4 × 21-inch (533 mm) torpedo tubes (12 torpedoes); 1 × 4-inch (102 mm)/50-caliber

USS S-18 (SS-123) was an S-18-class submarine, also referred to as an S-1-class or "Holland"-type, of the United States Navy in commission from 1924 to 1945. She served during World War II, seeing duty primarily in the Aleutian Islands campaign.

== Design ==
The S-18-class had a length of 219 feet 3 inches (66.8 m) overall, a beam of 20 ft 8 in (6.3 m), and a mean draft of 17 ft 3 in (5.3 m). They displaced 930 long tons (940 t) on the surface and 1,094 long tons (1,112 t) submerged. All S-class submarines had a crew of 4 officers and 34 enlisted men, when first commissioned. They had a diving depth of 200 ft (61.0 m).

For surface running, the S-18-class were powered by two 600-brake-horsepower (447 kW) NELSECO diesel engines, each driving one propeller shaft. When submerged each propeller was driven by a 1,175-horsepower (876 kW) Ridgway Dynamo & Engine Company electric motor. They could reach 14 knots (26 km/h; 16 mph) on the surface and 11 kn (20 km/h; 13 mph) underwater.

The boats were armed with four 21-inch (533 mm) torpedo tubes in the bow. They carried eight reloads, for a total of twelve torpedoes. The S-18-class submarines were also armed with a single 4 in (100 mm)/50 caliber deck gun.

== Construction ==
S-18's keel was laid down on 15 August 1918, by the Fore River Shipyard, in Quincy, Massachusetts. She was launched on 29 April 1920, sponsored by Miss Virginia Belle Johnson, daughter of Senator Edwin S. Johnson, and commissioned on 3 April 1924.

== Service history ==
=== 1924–1941 ===
From 1924 to 1929, S-18 operated from New London, Connecticut, primarily off the New England coast, but with annual deployments to the Caribbean Sea, for winter maneuvers, and Fleet Problems. Transferred to the Pacific Fleet in 1930, she departed New London on 24 May 1930, operated off the California coast, into the fall of 1930, and arrived at Pearl Harbor, in the Territory of Hawaii, on 7 December 1930.

For the next 11 years, S-18 was based at Pearl Harbor. In September 1941, she returned to the West Coast.

=== World War II ===
==== December 1941–May 1942 ====
The United States entered World War II, with the Japanese attack on Pearl Harbor, on 7 December 1941. S-18 was ordered to the Aleutian Islands, as part of Submarine Division 41 (SubDiv 41). S-18 moved north in mid-January 1942, and into March 1942, she conducted defensive patrols out of the new and still incomplete submarine base at Dutch Harbor, on Amaknak Island, off Unalaska, in the Aleutians. In mid-March 1942, she got underway for San Diego, California, and underwent repairs there until mid-May 1942.

==== Aleutian Islands campaign ====
With her repairs complete, S-18 departed San Diego, in May 1942, to return to the Aleutians. While enroute, on 29 May 1942, she received orders to patrol the southern approaches to Umnak Pass, in anticipation of a Japanese attack, and on 2 June 1942, she took up her patrol station. On 3 June 1942, planes from the Japanese Navy aircraft carriers Ryūjō and Jun'yō attacked Dutch Harbor. commencing the Battle of Dutch Harbor of 3–4 June 1942 and beginning the Aleutian islands campaign. Soon afterward, Japanese troops landed troops on Kiska and Attu.

Hampered by fog, rain, and poor radio reception; and lacking radar, a fathometer, and deciphering equipment; S-18 remained on patrol through 10 June 1942. Orders for submerged daylight operations in combat areas, compelled S-18, and the other the World War I design submarines of the North Pacific Force, to increase their submerged time to 19 hours a day, with surfaced recharging time cut to the brief five hours of the northern summer night. On 11 June 1942, she returned to Dutch Harbor.

On 13 June 1942, S-18 was underway again to patrol west and north of Attu, then north of Kiska. The weather, as on earlier patrols, was consistently bad. Habitability in the S-boats was poor. Material defects and design limitations in speed and maneuverability continued to plague her. On 29 June 1942, she sighted a Japanese submarine, but was unable to close. The same day, she returned to Dutch Harbor, and as at the conclusion of previous patrols, her commanding officer requested up-to-date sound and radar equipment.

From 15 July to 2 August 1942, S-18 conducted another patrol in the Kiska area, and on completion of that patrol, she was ordered back to San Diego.

In October 1942, S-18 returned to the Aleutians, and on 22 October 1942, she cleared Dutch Harbor, for her next patrol, again in the Kiska area. On 3 November 1942, however, she was recalled and ordered to prepare for a longer, more distant patrol. On 12 November 1942, she put to sea, but on 15 November 1942, a crack in the starboard main engine housing forced her back to Dutch Harbor.

She arrived on 20 November 1942, and her repairs were completed by the end of the month. On 30 November 1942, S-18 resumed her patrol, moved west, and operated off Kiska, Kiskinato, Agattu, and Attu. On 22 December 1942, after 16 days in her patrol area, she lost her starboard stern plane, and depth control became erratic. On 28 December 1942, she returned to Dutch Harbor.

Repairs and refit took S-18 into 1943, and on 7 January 1943, she got underway again. During that 28-day patrol, she reconnoitered Attu, and the Semichi Islands. On 4 February 1943, she was ordered back to San Diego, for overhaul.

==== February 1943–September 1945 ====
Upon completion of her overhaul, S-18 was assigned to training duty. For the remainder of World War II, she remained in the San Diego area, providing training services for the West Coast Sound School.

== Fate ==
Hostilities ended in mid-August 1945, and in late September 1945, she moved north to San Francisco, California, where she was decommissioned on 29 October 1945. On 13 November 1945, S-18's name was struck from the Naval Vessel Register. On 9 November 1946, her 26-year-old hulk was sold for scrapping to the Salco Iron and Metal Company, in San Francisco.

== Awards ==
- American Defense Service Medal
- American Campaign Medal
- Asiatic-Pacific Campaign Medal with one battle star
- World War II Victory Medal

== Bibliography ==
- "Table 21 - Ships on Navy List June 30, 1919". Congressional Serial Set. U.S. Government Printing Office: 770. 1921.
- Friedman, Norman (1995). U.S. Submarines Through 1945: An Illustrated Design History. Annapolis, Maryland: Naval Institute Press. ISBN 1-55750-263-3.
- Priolo, Gary. "S-18 (SS-123)". Navsource.net.
- Hall, Anne Martin (1925). Ships of the United States navy and their sponsors, 1913-1923.
- "S-18". Dictionary of American Naval Fighting Ships. Navy Department, Naval History and Heritage Command. 1 September 2015. This article incorporates text from this source, which is in the public domain.
