= USS Perch (SS-313) =

USS Perch

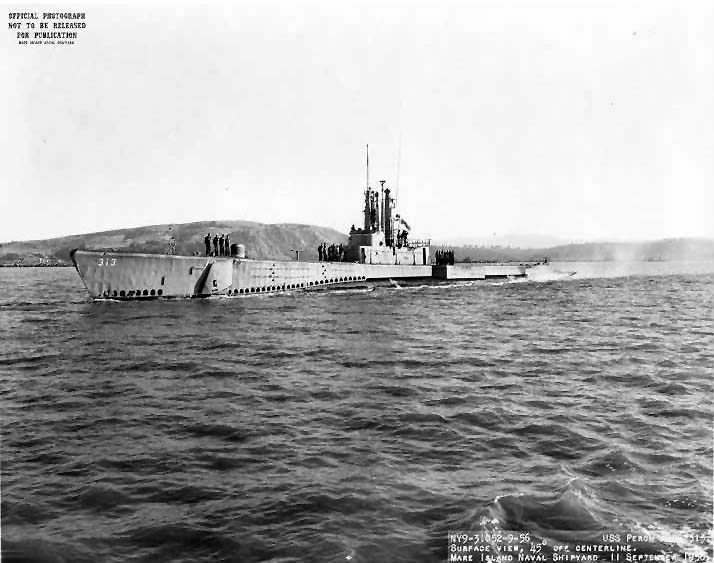
- Perch (ASSP-313), at Mare Island Naval Shipyard, Vallejo, CA., 11 Sept. 1956.

History

United States
- Builder: Electric Boat Company, Groton, Connecticut
- Laid down: 5 January 1943
- Launched: 12 September 1943
- Commissioned: 7 January 1944
- Decommissioned: January 1947
- Recommissioned: 20 May 1948
- Decommissioned: 31 March 1960
- Recommissioned: 11 November 1961
- Decommissioned: 27 May 1967
- Stricken: 1 December 1971
- Fate: Sold for scrap, 15 January 1973

General characteristics
- Class & type: Balao class diesel-electric submarine
- Displacement: 1,526 tons (1,550 t) surfaced; 2,424 tons (2,463 t) submerged
- Length: 311 ft 9 in (95.02 m)
- Beam: 27 ft 3 in (8.31 m)
- Draft: 16 ft 10 in (5.13 m) maximum
- Propulsion: 4 × General Motors Model 16-278A V16 diesel engines driving electrical generators; 2 × 126-cell Sargo batteries; 4 × high-speed General Electric electric motors with reduction gears; 2 × propellers; 5,400 shp (4.0 MW) surfaced; 2,740 shp (2.0 MW) submerged
- Speed: 20.25 knots (38 km/h) surfaced; 8.75 knots (16 km/h) submerged
- Range: 11,000 nautical miles (20,000 km) surfaced at 10 knots (19 km/h)
- Endurance: 48 hours at 2 knots (3.7 km/h) submerged; 75 days on patrol
- Test depth: 400 ft (120 m)
- Complement: 10 officers, 70–71 enlisted
- Armament: 10 × 21-inch (533 mm) torpedo tubes; 6 forward, 4 aft; 24 torpedoes; 1 × 5-inch (127 mm) / 25 caliber deck gun; Bofors 40 mm and Oerlikon 20 mm cannon

USS Perch (SS/SSP/ASSP/APSS/LPSS/IXSS-313), a Balao-class submarine, was the second submarine of the United States Navy to be named for the perch, a freshwater spiny-finned fish.

== Construction and commissioning ==
Perch was laid down on 5 January 1943 by the Electric Boat Company at Groton, Connecticut; launched on 12 September 1943, sponsored by Mrs. David A. Hart; and commissioned on 7 January 1944.

== Operational history ==
After shakedown, Perch departed 19 February 1944 for Key West, Florida, where she gave services to the Fleet Sound School. She then sailed for Pearl Harbor, Hawaii, arriving 3 April 1944.

=== First and second war patrols, April – August 1944 ===
On 29 April she departed Pearl Harbor with Peto (SS-265) for Midway where Picuda (SS-382) joined them. The South China Sea was the hunting ground for the wolf pack. Early in the morning of 24 May, a medium tanker was contacted and damaged by four torpedo hits. The counterattack by a lone escort prevented further observation of the damage inflicted and knocked out both high pressure air compressors by flooding of the pump room. Perch headed for the Marshall Islands, arriving at Majuro on 4 June.

On 27 June Perch began her second war patrol, this time off Surigao Strait in the Philippines. She sank a 100-ton Japanese trawler with gunfire before returning to Pearl Harbor 26 August.

=== Third and fourth war patrols, September 1944 – February 1945 ===
Perch departed Pearl Harbor on her third war patrol 19 September. At Midway she joined submarines Croaker (SS-246) and Escolar (SS-294) and the three set out for the confined waters of the East China and Yellow Seas. Perch unsuccessfully attacked one heavily escorted transport, and performed lifeguard duty supporting B-29 raids on Honshū. Perch then headed for Saipan to refuel en route to Brisbane, Australia, for duty with Submarines, Southwest Pacific Fleet.

The fourth war patrol began 19 December from Brisbane. First Perch patrolled off Hainan, China; next off Singapore; and finally in Balabac Straits off Borneo. She sighted no enemy ships, and the patrol ended at Fremantle, Western Australia, 15 February 1945.

=== Fifth and sixth war patrols, March – June 1945 ===
On 12 March Perch departed Fremantle carrying with her eleven Australasian specialists trained in commando warfare, under the command of Major Donald Stott. On the first night of the mission, in the Makassar Straits, above Balikpapan, Borneo, she landed four of the party (including Stott) who were to make a reconnaissance of the beach and surrounding territory. Coming in close ashore two nights later to disembark the remainder of the party, Perch contacted a 300-ton coastal freighter that threatened to cut off her return to open water. She engaged it with gunfire and the second hit caused the freighter to burst into flames and sink. The first party were never heard from again. It was speculated that the engine which powered the officers kayak was heard. Locals believed they had been captured and executed by the Japanese. The second party rowed ashore, and placed their charges to blow up an oil supply pipeline. They were closely chased by Japanese patrols, but escaped by taking a small boat off the island. They were picked up well out to sea by a Catalina on patrol; only two of the party survived. Perch returned to Fremantle, Western Australia, completing her fifth war patrol.

On 15 April Perch departed Fremantle on her sixth war patrol and journeyed to the Java Sea to hunt out the enemy. When she contacted a convoy of two ships, an alert Japanese escort discovered Perch and subjected her to a severe two-hour depth charging which caused considerable damage throughout the boat. She then sailed to the China coast to patrol off Hainan before returning to Pearl Harbor 5 June.

=== Seventh war patrol, July – August 1945 ===
On 11 July Perch departed Pearl Harbor and after fueling at Saipan, proceeded north for duty in the "Lifeguard League" off Japan. On 13 August she rescued a Navy Corsair pilot from the water two miles (3 km) offshore, bombarded fishing vessels and buildings on the beach, and retired to sea. A few hours later the same day, she picked up another pilot from the same fighter squadron five miles (8 km) offshore. Two days later Japan capitulated and Perch returned to Pearl Harbor 30 August.

=== Conversion to transport submarine; Korean War ===
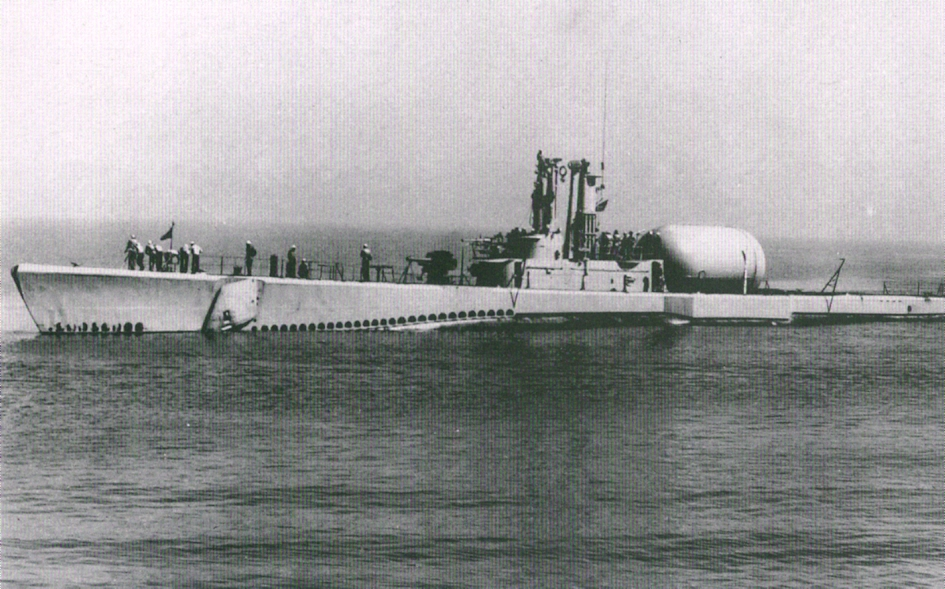
Perch after her conversion into a transport submarine (ASSP-313).

Perch departed Pearl Harbor and set course for the Golden Gate, arriving Hunter's Point 8 September. She decommissioned and was placed in reserve in January 1947. On 19 January 1948 Perch was redesignated as a Submarine Transport, SSP–313, and was placed in an active status, attached to the U.S. Pacific Fleet.

Perch recommissioned at Mare Island Naval Shipyard 20 May 1948. Through 1949, the ship participated in various troop- and cargo-carrying exercises. On 31 January 1950 Perch was reclassified a "transport submarine," ASSP-313. In September 1950 Perch transported a force from Britain's 41 (Independent) Commando Royal Marines in a raid on the northeast coast of Korea west of Tanchon. The target, a train tunnel on the north-south supply line, was destroyed, with the loss of one man who was buried at sea. The commanding officer, Lieutenant Commander R. D. Quinn, became the only submarine commanding officer to receive a combat award during the Korean War when he was awarded the Bronze Star for this action.

During this time, the Perch was fitted with a large sausage shaped hangar on her aft deck. Operational tests were made with both helicopter and amphibious boats.

=== 1950s ===
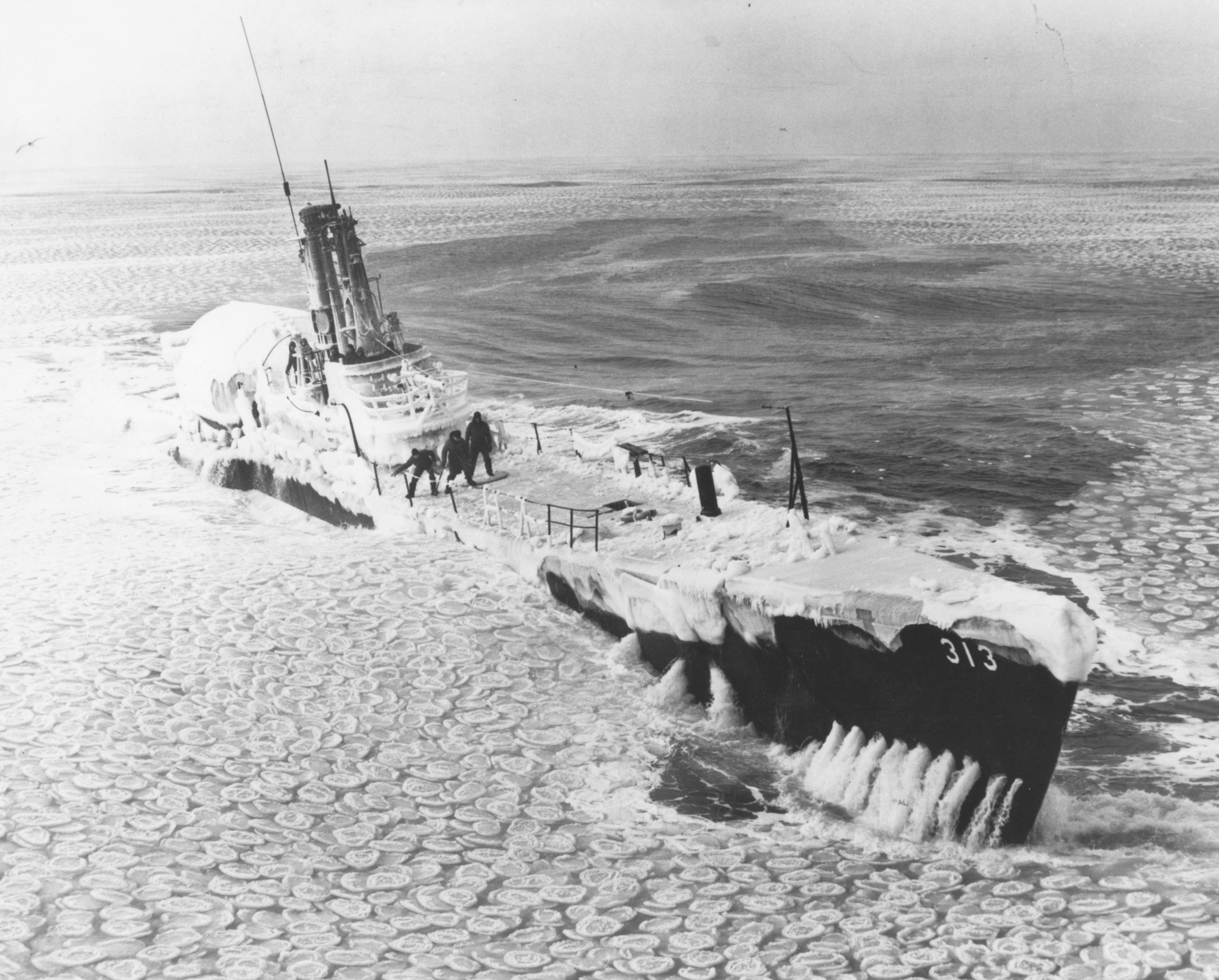
USS Perch (APSS-313) in the polar ice cap, 1952–1953.

From August 1951 to March 1952, Perch underwent overhaul at Mare Island. From 1952 to 1954, Perch trained, making "reconnaissance-runs" and "raids" on several Alaskan and Hawaiian islands. In January 1955 Perch made a cruise to WestPac conducting a "reconnaissance and raid" on Iwo Jima and observed other islands in the Bonin Chain. Periods between Far Eastern cruises, Perch performed type training and intertype amphibious exercises in the San Diego area.

Perch, again classified as a Submarine Transport, APSS-313, on 24 October 1956, departed San Diego 5 November for a reconnaissance exercise in the Panama Canal Area, returning to San Diego 11 December. In late 1957 she made a reconnaissance voyage from San Diego to Hawaii and Alaska, and spent most of 1958 and 1959 in amphibious training exercises in the San Diego area with marines and Underwater Demolition Teams.

In December 1959 Perch departed San Diego, decommissioned on 31 March 1960, and entered the Mare Island Group of the Pacific Reserve Fleet at Vallejo, Calif.

=== 1960s–1970s ===
Perch recommissioned 11 November 1961, Lt. Comdr. C.H. Hedgepeth in command, trained on the West Coast and Hawaii through 1962, and arrived at her new homeport, Subic Bay, Philippine Islands in March 1963. Her operations consisted of training the U.S. Marine's Amphibious Recon Battalion, Army Special Forces, and Navy UDTs in reconnaissance and also in providing training services to allied countries. In May and June 1964 Perch traveled to Mindoro and trained with British commando forces. July and August were spent in Hong Kong, Pohong Bay, Korea (with R.O.K. Special Forces), Yokosuka and Okinawa, Japan.

March and April 1965, saw Perch participating in exercise "Jungle Drum III" by landing 75 Marine Corps reconnaissance personnel on the Malay Peninsula from the Gulf of Siam. Perch conducted search and rescue operations in the Vietnam combat zone during August and September. She made two amphibious landings on the coast of South Vietnam during November and December as part of Operation Dagger Thrust.

During January 1966 Perch landed UDT personnel for beach survey work in South Vietnam as part of Operation Double Eagle. She then provided services at Legaspi, Philippines to train Filipino and American UDT personnel. Between local training operations in the Subic Bay area, Perch worked with Chinese Special Forces at Kaohsiung, Taiwan, and with Army Special Forces at Keelung, Taiwan.

In July Perch participated in Operation Deckhouse II on the coast of South Vietnam. Again in August, Perch conducted several independent beach surveys with UDT personnel along the coast of South Vietnam. For Operation Deckhouse IV in September Perch landed UDT personnel on five successive nights for pre-invasion beach reconnaissance. On 7 October 1966, Perch headed for Pearl Harbor via Hong Kong, Palau Islands, Guam, and Midway Island. She operated in Hawaiian waters until 1967 when she became Naval Reserve Training submarine at San Diego. On 22 August 1968 Perch's classification was changed from APSS–313 to Submarine Transport LPSS–313. She was designated an Unclassified Miscellaneous Submarine IXSS-313 on 30 June 1971.

== Disposal ==
Perch was decommissioned and struck from the Naval Register on 1 December 1971 and was sold for scrapping on 15 January 1973.

== Awards ==
- Asiatic-Pacific Campaign Medal with four battle stars
- World War II Victory Medal
- National Defense Service Medal with star
- Korean Service Medal with one battle star
- Vietnam Service Medal
- United Nations Service Medal
- Republic of Vietnam Campaign Medal
