= John Walton (entomologist) =

English entomologist

John Walton (23 July 1784, Knaresborough, Yorkshire- 3 January 1862, Knaresborough) was an English entomologist who specialised in Coleoptera especially Curculionidae. His collection is held by the Natural History Museum, London.

Walton was educated first in Knaresborough then in London, where he studied chemistry at the Mathematical Society of Spitalfields. He applied his education to sugar refining in his uncle's refinery based in Whitechapel. He retired in 1832 to devote himself to entomology. He corresponded with Carl Johan Schönherr, Ernst Friedrich Germar and Louis Alexandre Auguste Chevrolat, exchanging specimens with all three.

He was a fellow of the Entomological Society and the Linnaean Society.

== Works ==
partial list

- Walton J., 1838. Notes upon the genera Sitona, Polydrosus, Phyllobius, and Apion Entomological Magazine, 5: 1–21, 254–257

Walton, J. 1844 Notes on the Synonymy of the Genus Apion, with Descriptions of Five new Species Annals and Magazine of Natural History Series 1 Volume 13, 1844 - Issue 8

- Walton J., 1856: List of British Curculionidae, with synonyma. Catalogue of British Rhynchophora. 46 pp
