= Thomas Williams (rugby league) =

Wales international rugby league footballer

Personal information
- Full name: Thomas Williams
- Born: Wales
- Died: unknown

Playing information
- Position: Wing
Club
Years	Team	Pld	T	G	FG	P
1911–19	Oldham	83	40	0	0	120
Representative
Years	Team	Pld	T	G	FG	P
1913	Wales	1

Thomas "Tom" Williams (birth unknown – death unknown) was a Welsh professional rugby league footballer who played in the 1910s. He played at representative level for Wales, and at club level for Oldham, as a wing.

== International honours ==
Williams won a cap for Wales while at Oldham in 1913.
