= Harry Slater (rugby) =

English rugby league footballer

Personal information
- Full name: Harold Slater
- Born: c. 1883
- Died: unknown

Playing information

Rugby union
Club
Years	Team	Pld	T	G	FG	P
≤1904–≤04	Wakefield Balne Lane RFC

Rugby league
- Position: Stand-off, Scrum-half
Club
Years	Team	Pld	T	G	FG	P
1904–13	Wakefield Trinity	182	62	12	0	210
Representative
Years	Team	Pld	T	G	FG	P
	Yorkshire

Harry Slater (born c. 1883 – death unknown) was a rugby union, and professional rugby league footballer who played in the 1900s and 1910s. He played club level rugby union (RU) for Wakefield Balne Lane RFC (the team was runner-up in rugby union's Yorkshire Cup in both 1905 (against Harrogate RUFC) and 1906 (against Castleford RUFC (in Castleford, Wakefield)), and representative rugby league (RL) for Yorkshire, and at club level for Wakefield Trinity (captain), as a stand-off, or scrum-half.

== Playing career ==
=== County honours ===
Harry Slater won cap(s) for Yorkshire (RL) while at Wakefield Trinity.

=== Challenge Cup Final appearances ===
Harry Slater played stand-off, and was captain in Wakefield Trinity's 17−0 victory over Hull F.C. in the 1909 Challenge Cup Final during the 1908–09 season at Headingley, Leeds on Tuesday 20 April 1909, in front of a crowd of 23,587.

=== Notable tour matches ===
Harry Slater played scrum-half in Wakefield Trinity's 20-13 victory over Australia in the 1908–09 Kangaroo tour of Great Britain match at Belle Vue, Wakefield on Saturday 19 December 1908.

=== Club career ===
Harry Slater made his début for Wakefield Trinity during September 1904.
