= John Walton (rugby league) =

English rugby league footballer

Personal information
- Full name: John Walton

Playing information
- Position: Forward
Club
Years	Team	Pld	T	G	FG	P
1902–12/13	Wakefield Trinity	317	13 (11?)	0	0	33 (39?)

John "Jack" Walton was a professional rugby league footballer who played in the 1900s and 1910s. He played at club level for Wakefield Trinity, as a forward.

== Playing career ==
=== Challenge Cup Final appearances ===
Walton played as a forward in Wakefield Trinity's 17-0 victory over Hull F.C. in the 1909 Challenge Cup Final during the 1908–09 season at Headingley, Leeds on Tuesday 20 April 1909, in front of a crowd of 23,587.

=== County Cup Final appearances ===
Walton played as a forward in Wakefield Trinity's 8-2 victory over Huddersfield in the 1910 Yorkshire Cup Final during the 1910–11 season at Headingley, Leeds on Saturday 3 December 1910.

=== Notable tour matches ===
Walton played as a forward in Wakefield Trinity's 20-13 victory over Australia in the 1908–09 Kangaroo tour of Great Britain match at Belle Vue, Wakefield on Saturday 19 December 1908.

=== Notable tour matches ===
Walton made his début for Wakefield Trinity during October 1902, and he played his last match for Wakefield Trinity during the 1912–13 season.
