= Nealy Crosland =

English rugby league footballer

Arthur Crosland
Personal information
- Full name: Arthur Kenealy Crosland
- Born: c. 1881; Wakefield district, England
- Died: 1929 (aged 48); Doncaster, England

Playing information
- Position: Forward
Club
Years	Team	Pld	T	G	FG	P
1900–22	Wakefield Trinity	533	22	14	0	94
Representative
Years	Team	Pld	T	G	FG	P
1905–19	Yorkshire	7	0	0	0	0

Arthur Kenealy Crosland (c. 1881 – 1929), also known by the nickname of "Nealy", was an English professional rugby league footballer who played in the 1900s, 1910s and 1920s. He played at representative level for Yorkshire, and at club level for Wakefield Trinity (captain) as a forward.

== Playing career ==
=== Wakefield Trinity career ===
Nealy Crosland played as a forward, and scored a try in Wakefield Trinity's 17–0 victory over Hull F.C. in the 1909 Challenge Cup Final during the 1908–09 season at Headingley, Leeds on Tuesday 20 April 1909, in front of a crowd of 23,587.

Nealy Crosland played as a forward in Wakefield Trinity's 8–2 victory over Huddersfield in the 1910 Yorkshire Cup Final during the 1910–11 season at Headingley, Leeds on Saturday 3 December 1910.

Nealy Crosland played as a forward in Wakefield Trinity's 0–6 defeat by Hull F.C. in the 1914 Challenge Cup Final during the 1913–14 season at Thrum Hall, Halifax, in front of a crowd of 19,000.

=== International honours ===
Nealy was selected for England in 1909 for the international against Wales, at Wakefield; but a week before the international, he suffered a serious injury at Hull KR (internal haemorrhaging) causing him to miss the next four months. He returned for the 1910 Tour Trial. Nealy Crosland was considered a "Probable" for the 1910 Great Britain Lions tour of Australia and New Zealand, but ultimately he was not selected for the tour.

== Death ==
In 1929, Crosland died in Doncaster after suffering a heart attack, aged 48. A benefit match took place in August 1929 to raise money for Crosland's widow and dependents, with the two teams being captained by Jonty Parkin and Joe Lyman.
