= Arthur Burton =

English rugby league footballer

Personal information
- Full name: Arthur Burton
- Born: c. 1889
- Died: unknown

Playing information
- Height: 5 ft 9 in (1.75 m)
- Weight: 12 st 0 lb (76 kg)
- Position: Forward
Club
Years	Team	Pld	T	G	FG	P
1909/10–20	Wakefield Trinity	206	28	9	0	102
Representative
Years	Team	Pld	T	G	FG	P
	Yorkshire	≥1

Arthur Burton (c. 1889 – death unknown) was a professional rugby league footballer who played in the 1900s, 1910s and 1920s. He played at representative level for Yorkshire, and at club level for Lofthouse Albion ARLFC (in Lofthouse, Leeds) (two spells), Leeds (A-Team), and Wakefield Trinity, as a forward.

== Playing career ==
Arthur Burton made his début for Wakefield Trinity during the 1909–10 season, and he played his last match for Wakefield Trinity during October 1920.

=== County honours ===
Arthur Burton won cap(s) for Yorkshire while at Wakefield Trinity during the 1913–14 season.

=== Challenge Cup Final appearances ===
Arthur Burton played as a forward in Wakefield Trinity's 0-6 defeat by Hull F.C. in the 1914 Challenge Cup Final during the 1913–14 season at Thrum Hall, Halifax, in front of a crowd of 19,000.
