= March (surname) =

March is a surname. Notable people with the surname include:

== A ==
- Aaron March (born 1986), Italian alpine snowboarder
- Alden March (1795–1869), American physician and surgeon, husband of Joanna P. Armsby
- Aleida March (born 1936), Cuban revolutionary and wife of Che Guevara
- April March (born 1965), American singer-songwriter and founder of The Pussywillows
- Arnau March (fl. c. 1410 – c. 1430), Provenço-Catalan knight and poet
- Arthur March (1891–1957), Austrian physicist
- Ausiàs March (c. 1397 – 1459), Valencian poet in the Catalan language

== B ==
- Babette March (born 1941), German-American model and chef
- Barbara March (1953–2019), Canadian movie actress
- Barbara Joan March (born 1945), American criminal from Connecticut
- Billy March (1925–1974), English footballer

== C ==
- Charles Gordon-Lennox, Earl of March and Kinrara (born 1955), British peer
- Charles H. March (1870–1945), American politician
- Charles March-Phillipps (1779–1862), British Whig politician
- Chris March (1963–2019), American fashion and costume designer

== D ==
- David March (born 1979), English rugby league footballer, twin brother of Paul March

== E ==
- Edgar J. March (1897–1971), English author of books on British working sailing craft
- Elsie March (1884–1974), English sculptor, sister of Sydney and Vernon March
- Elspeth March (1911–1999), English actress

== F ==
- Forbes March (born 1973), British-born Canadian actor
- Francis March (1825–1911), American academic, philologist, and lexicographer
- Frederick Hamilton March (1891–1977), Australian soldier
- Fredric March (1897–1975), American actor

== G ==
- Gary March, Australian investor and president of the Richmond Football Club
- George March (1932–2017), former English cricketer
- Gus March-Phillipps (1908–1942), British soldier

== H ==
- Hal March (1920–1970) Jewish-American comedian and actor
- Harry March (1875–1940), American football historian
- Henry March (1863–1917), Canadian physician and politician in Nova Scotia

== J ==
- Jack March (1919–1993), American tennis player and promoter
- James G. March (1928–2018), American psychologist and sociologist
- Janet March (1963–1996), American children's book illustrator and murder victim
- Jane March (born 1973), British actress and model
- Jaume March II (c. 1334 – 1410), Catalan poet
- Jerry March, Ph.D. (1929–1997), American chemist and author of March's Advanced Organic Chemistry
- Jill March (born 1950), pseudonym of American author Nora Roberts
- Jim March (born 1954), Scottish footballer
- Joe March (born 1967), American arena football player
- John March (colonel) (1658–1712), Massachusetts businessman and soldier
- John March (barrister) (c. 1611 – 1657), English barrister and legal writer
- Juan Antonio March Pujol (born 1958), Spanish diplomat
- Juan March Ordinas (1880–1962), Spanish businessman
- Justin March (born 1993), American football linebacker

== K ==
- Kevin March (businessman), American business executive
- Kevin March (musician), American drummer, record producer and songwriter

== L ==
- Lionel March (1934–2018), British mathematician, architect and digital artist
- Liska March (1906–2003), American dancer, actress and producer
- Lori March (1923–2013), American actress

== M ==
- Mush March (1908–2002), Canadian ice hockey player

== N ==
- Nimmy March (born 1962), English television actress

== O ==
- Otto March (1845–1913), German architect, father of Werner and Walter

== P ==
- Paul March (born 1979), English rugby league footballer and coach, twin brother of David March
- Peggy March (born 1948), American pop music singer
- Perry March, (born 1961) American lawyer and convicted murderer
- Peyton Conway March (1864–1955), American general
- Peyton C. March, Jr. (1896–1914), American military pilot
- Pere March (c. 1336 – 1413), Catalan poet

== R ==
- Robert March (1928–2010), Australian of East Asian business practices
- Rosalind March (fl. 1979— ), British actress

== S ==
- Samuel March (1861–1935), British Labour politician
- Solly March (born 1994), English footballer
- Stan March (born 1938), English footballer
- Stephanie March (born 1974), American television actress
- Stephen March (died 1880), Newfoundland politician, father of Stephen Rendell
- Stephen Rendell March (1851–1935), Newfoundland merchant and politician, son of Stephen
- Steve March (born 1946), American politician and auditor
- Steve March-Tormé (born 1953), an American singer and songwriter
- Susana March (1918–1990), Spanish writer and poet
- Sydney March (1876–1968), English sculptor, brother of Elsie and Vernon March

== V ==
- Vernon March (1891–1930), English sculptor, brother of Elsie and Sydney March
- Vicente March (1859–1927), Spanish painter

== W ==
- Walter March (1898–1969), German architect, son of Otto and brother of Werner
- Werner March (1894–1976), German architect, son of Otto and brother of Walter
- William March (1893–1954), American author and novelist

== Fictional characters ==
- Audrey and Lucille March, characters in the American soap opera General Hospital
- Colonel March, fictional detective created by John Dickson Carr
- Cure March (a.k.a Nao Midorikawa), character in the Toei anime series Smile PreCure!
- Holland and Holly March, characters in The Nice Guys (2016) played by Ryan Gosling and Angourie Rice
- Vivien March, character in the BBC soap opera Doctors
- Zosia March, character from the BBC medical drama Holby City

== See also ==
- March (disambiguation)
- Marche (disambiguation)
