= 2007 Wakefield Trinity Wildcats season =

- Super League XII Rank: 8th
- Challenge Cup: 5th round
| ← 2006 | 2008 → |

In the 2007 rugby league season, the Wakefield Trinity Wildcats competed in Super League XII and the 2007 Challenge Cup.

== Results ==
=== Super League XII ===
==== League table ====
| Pos | Team | Pld | W | D | L | PF | PA | PD | Pts | Qualification |
|---|---|---|---|---|---|---|---|---|---|---|
| 1 | St Helens (L) | 27 | 19 | 0 | 8 | 783 | 422 | +361 | 38 | Semifinal |
| 2 | Leeds Rhinos (C) | 27 | 18 | 1 | 8 | 747 | 487 | +260 | 37 | Semifinal |
| 3 | Bradford Bulls | 27 | 17 | 1 | 9 | 778 | 560 | +218 | 33 (Note: Bradford deducted 2 points for salary cap breaches.) | Elimination semifinal |
| 4 | Hull F.C. | 27 | 14 | 2 | 11 | 573 | 553 | +20 | 30 | Elimination semifinal |
| 5 | Huddersfield Giants | 27 | 13 | 1 | 13 | 638 | 543 | +95 | 27 | Elimination semifinal |
| 6 | Wigan Warriors | 27 | 15 | 1 | 11 | 621 | 527 | +94 | 27 (Note: Wigan deducted 4 points for salary cap breaches.) | Elimination semifinal |
| 7 | Warrington Wolves | 27 | 13 | 0 | 14 | 693 | 736 | −43 | 26 | |
| 8 | Wakefield Trinity Wildcats | 27 | 11 | 1 | 15 | 596 | 714 | −118 | 23 | |
| 9 | Harlequins | 27 | 10 | 3 | 14 | 495 | 636 | −141 | 23 | |
| 10 | Catalans Dragons | 27 | 10 | 1 | 16 | 570 | 685 | −115 | 21 | |
| 11 | Hull Kingston Rovers | 27 | 10 | 0 | 17 | 491 | 723 | −232 | 20 | |
| 12 | Salford City Reds (R) | 27 | 6 | 1 | 20 | 475 | 874 | −399 | 13 | Relegation to National League One |

Source: Rugby League Project
Rules for classification: 1) Points; 2) Points difference; 3) Number of points scored;
(C) Champions; (L) League Leaders' Shield Winners; (R) Relegated

==== Super League results ====
W Win D Draw L Loss

Super League results
| Date | Round | Versus | H/A | Venue | Result | Score | Tries | Goals | Attendance | Report |
|---|---|---|---|---|---|---|---|---|---|---|
| 10 February | 1 | Hull Kingston Rovers | A | Craven Park | L | 9–14 | Obst | Rooney (2 + 1 FG) | 7,154 | RLP |
| 18 February | 2 | St Helens | H | Belle Vue | W | 29–22 | Atkins, Blaymire, Catic, Ferres, Rooney | Rooney (4 + 1 FG) | 7,385 | RLP |
| 25 February | 3 | Salford City Reds | H | Belle Vue | W | 36–24 | Atkins, Henderson, Leo-Latu, MacGillivray, Rooney | Rooney (8) | 6,385 | RLP |
| 4 March | 4 | Hull F.C. | A | KC Stadium | W | 19–6 | | | 13,229 | RLP |
| 11 March | 5 | Catalans Dragons | H | Belle Vue | W | 40–20 | Demetriou (2), Blaymire, Fox, Jeffries, Rooney, Tadulala | Rooney (6) | 5,332 | RLP |
| 16 March | 6 | Leeds Rhinos | H | Belle Vue | L | 26–32 | Atkins (2), Fox (2), Jeffries | Rooney (3) | 9,973 | RLP |
| 25 March | 7 | Warrington Wolves | H | Belle Vue | W | 30–24 | Atkins, Fox, Jeffries, Leo-Latu, P. March, Pryce | Rooney (3) | 6,119 | RLP |
| 6 April | 8 | Huddersfield Giants | A | Galpharm Stadium | L | 12–56 | Blaymire, moore | Rooney (2) | 6,757 | RLP |
| 9 April | 9 | Bradford Bulls | H | Belle Vue | L | 24–36 | Fox (2), Blaymire, Henderson, Rooney | Rooney (2) | 9,106 | RLP |
| 14 April | 10 | Harlequins RL | A | Twickenham Stoop | D | 22–22 | Blaymire (2), P. March, Pryce | Rooney (3) | 2,532 | RLP |
| 20 April | 11 | Wigan Warriors | A | JJB Stadium | L | 10–44 | Demetriou, Jeffries | Rooney | 14,108 | RLP |
| 28 April | 12 | Hull F.C. | H | Belle Vue | L | 18–20 | Atkins (2), Golden, Jeffries | Rooney | 7,142 | RLP |
| 6 May | 13 | Huddersfield Giants | N | Millennium Stadium | L | 12–36 | Rooney, White | Rooney (2) | 26,447 | RLP |
| 18 May | 14 | St Helens | A | Knowsley Road | L | 14–34 | Elima, Gleeson | Rooney (3) | 8,529 | RLP |
| 27 May | 15 | Catalans Dragons | H | Belle Vue | W | 18–12 | Demetriou, Pryce, Rooney | Rooney (3) | 4,023 | RLP |
| 3 June | 16 | Hull Kingston Rovers | H | Belle Vue | W | 30–15 | Blaymire (2), Jeffries, Watene, White | P. March (5) | 6,107 | RLP |
| 17 June | 17 | Warrington Wolves | A | Halliwell Jones Stadium | L | 12–31 | Catic, Pryce | Ferres (2) | 10,324 | RLP |
| 1 July | 18 | Wigan Warriors | H | Belle Vue | W | 32–6 | Jeffries (2), Blaymire, Demetriou, Fox, Moore | Ferres (3), Jeffries | 8,126 | RLP |
| 6 July | 19 | Salford City Reds | A | The Willows | W | 35–18 | Atkins (2), Fox, Jeffries, MacGillivray, Rooney | Rooney (5 + 1 FG) | 4,178 | RLP |
| 15 July | 20 | Huddersfield Giants | H | Belle Vue | L | 23–24 | Fox (2), Obst (2) | Rooney (3 + 1 FG) | 5,241 | RLP |
| 20 July | 21 | Leeds Rhinos | A | Headingley | W | 23–16 | Atkins, Elima, George | Rooney (5 + 1 FG) | 16,654 | RLP |
| 5 August | 22 | Bradford Bulls | A | Grattan Stadium | L | 24–38 | Atkins, Demetriou, Fox, Henderson | Rooney (4) | 10,701 | RLP |
| 12 August | 23 | Harlequins RL | H | Belle Vue | W | 28–14 | Atkins (2), Catic, Rooney, White | Rooney (4) | 5,128 | RLP |
| 17 August | 24 | Hull F.C. | H | Belle Vue | L | 24–42 | Atkins, Demetriou, Rooney | Rooney (6) | 8,115 | RLP |
| 1 September | 25 | Catalans Dragons | A | Stade Gilbert Brutus | L | 20–38 | Rooney (2), Obst | Rooney (4) | 7,325 | RLP |
| 9 September | 26 | Huddersfield Giants | A | Galpharm Stadium | L | 22–24 | Demetriou (2), White | Rooney (5) | 7,066 | RLP |
| 14 September | 27 | Leeds Rhinos | A | Headingley | L | 4–46 | Jeffries | | 19,226 | RLP |

=== Challenge Cup ===
W Win L Loss

Challenge Cup results
| Date | Round | Versus | H/A | Venue | Result | Score | Tries | Goals | Attendance | Report |
|---|---|---|---|---|---|---|---|---|---|---|
| 30 March | 4 | London Skolars | H | Belle Vue | W | 52–4 | Henderson, Buchanan, Catic, Ferres, Fox, Golden, Jeffries, P. March, Murphy, Pryce | P. March (3), Ferres | 2,427 | RLP |
| 13 May | 5 | Bradford Bulls | H | Belle Vue | L | 4–14 | White | | 3,700 | RLP |

== Players ==
=== Squad ===
2007 Wakefield Trinity Squad
| First team squad | | | Coaching staff |
|---|---|---|---|
| Mark Applegarth; Ryan Atkins; Ricky Bibey; Matt Blaymire; Ned Catic; Jason Demetriou (c); Olivier Elima; Dale Ferguson; Brett Ferres; Mark Field; Peter Fox; Luke George; Sean Gleeson | Jason Golden; Maxime Grésèque; Kevin Henderson; Ben Jeffries; Tevita Leo-Latu; Danny Lima; Duncan MacGillivray; David March; Paul March; Richard Moore; Sam Obst; Waine Pryce; Jamie Rooney | Danny Sculthorpe; Semi Tadulala; Adam Watene; Paul White | Head coach: John Kear; Legend: (c) Captain(s); (vc) Vice-captain(s); Updated: Source(s): Rugby League Project |

=== Transfers ===
Gains

List of players joining Wakefield
| Player | Club | Date |
|---|---|---|
| Danny Sculthorpe | Wigan Warriors | 2006 |
| Waine Pryce | Castleford Tigers | 2006 |
| Peter Fox | Leeds Rhinos | 2006 |
| Brett Ferres | Bradford Bulls | 2006 |
| Paul March | Huddersfield Giants | 2006 |

Losses

List of players leaving Wakefield
| Player | Club | Date |
|---|---|---|
| Michael Korkidas | Salford City Reds | 2006 |
| David Solomona | Bradford Bulls | 2006 |
| James Evans | Bradford Bulls | 2006 |
| Colum Halpenny | Retired | 2006 |
| Tommy Saxton | Castleford Tigers | 2006 |
| Monty Betham | Retired | 2006 |
