= Treize Tournoi =

Anglo-French rugby league competition

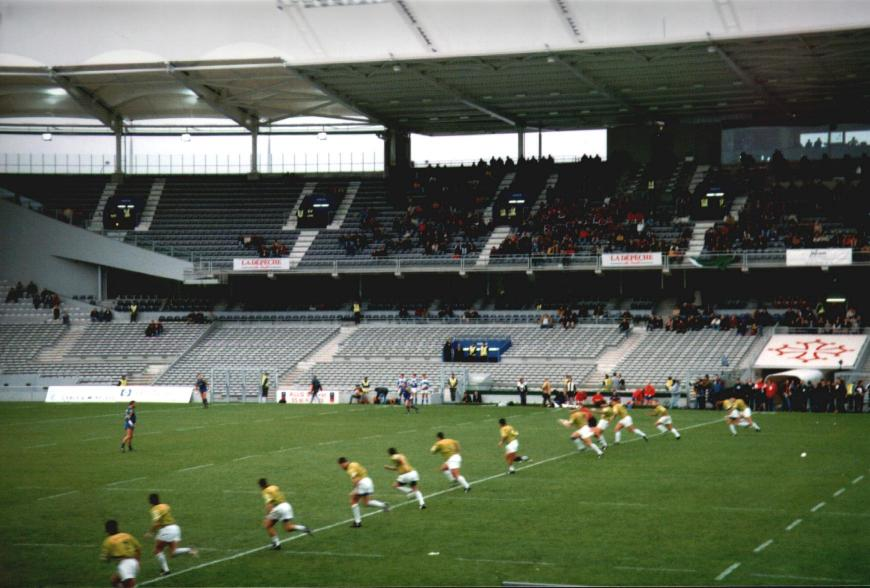

The Treize Tournoi was a short-lived Anglo-French rugby league competition held at the end of the season in 1998. Known as the EMAP Treize Tournoi for sponsorship reasons, the tournament was organised by the First and Second Division Association, and was contested by the winners and runners-up of the First Division, the winners of the Second Division, and three teams from the French Championship.

== Teams ==
- Wakefield Trinity
- Featherstone Rovers
- Lancashire Lynx
- St-Estève
- Limoux
- Villeneuve

== Results ==
=== English Group ===
Pos	Team	Pld	W	D	L	PF	PA	PD	Pts	Qualification
1	Lancashire Lynx	4	3	0	1	94	107	−13	6	Advance to Final
2	Wakefield Trinity	4	2	0	2	96	105	−9	4	
3	Featherstone Rovers	4	1	0	3	92	119	−27	2	

=== French Group ===
Pos	Team	Pld	W	D	L	PF	PA	PD	Pts	Qualification
1	Villeneuve	4	3	0	1	122	62	+60	6	Advance to Final
2	St-Estève	4	2	0	2	134	94	+40	4	
3	Limoux	4	1	0	3	75	126	−51	2	

=== Round 1 ===
4 October 1998

Villeneuve	34 – 12	Wakefield Trinity
Try: Perrolari (3), Banquet, Despin, Devecchi; Goal: Banquet (5)	Report	Try: Stephenson, A. Hughes; Goal: A. Hughes (2)

Attendance: 2,000

4 October 1998

Limoux	19 – 10	Featherstone Rovers
Try: Puso (2), Raleigh; Goal: Albérola (3); Drop goal: Bourrel	Report	Try: Lowe, Baker; Goal: Chapman

Attendance: 2,112
Referee: Taberner (Wigan)

4 October 1998

St-Estève	26 – 40	Lancashire Lynx
Try: Brown, Couttet, Doyle, Thompson, Van Brussel; Goal: Couttet (3)		Try: Murray (4), D. Jones, Mawdsley, Walsh; Goal: P. Jones (6)

Attendance: 2,000

=== Round 2 ===
11 October 1998

Wakefield Trinity	38 – 36	Limoux
Try: Bostock (3), Gray (2), March, Mycoe; Goal: A. Hughes (5)		Try: Raleigh (4), Alonso, Hébert, Puso; Goal: Albérola (4)

Attendance: 1,506

11 October 1998

Featherstone Rovers	4 – 42	St-Estève
Try: Hall		Try: Guisset (2), Doyle, Garcia, Lockwood, Torreilles, Van Brussel, Verges; Goal: Couttet (4), Torreilles

Attendance: 1,130

11 October 1998

Lancashire Lynx	28 – 24	Villeneuve
Try: Donno, Gee, Kelly, Parsley, Taylor; Goal: P. Jones (4)		Try: Carrasco (2), Doorey, Perrolari, Wulf; Goal: Banquet (2)

Attendance: 372

=== Round 3 ===
18 October 1998

Limoux	10 – 24	Wakefield Trinity
Try: Gonzales, Rossel; Goal: Masson		Try: McDonald (2), Briggs, A. Hughes, Wray; Goal: Gray (2)

Attendance: 2,000
Referee: Oddy (Halifax)

18 October 1998

St-Estève	48 – 24	Featherstone Rovers
Try: Gomez (2), Torreilles (2), Couttet, Durand, Thompson, Verges; Goal: Couttet (8)		Try: Chapman, Handley, Peacock, Riley; Goal: Chapman (2), Rooney (2)

Attendance: 1,500

18 October 1998

Villeneuve	39 – 0	Lancashire Lynx
Try: Cornut (2), Frayssinous (2), Perrolari (2), Devecchi; Goal: Banquet (5); Drop goal: Banquet

Attendance: 2,000

=== Round 4 ===
25 October 1998

Wakefield Trinity	22 – 25	Villeneuve
Try: Bostock, Fisher, March, Mycoe; Goal: A. Hughes (3)	Report	Try: Collado, Banquet, Carrasco, Devecchi; Goal: Banquet (2); Drop goal: Frayssinous

Attendance: 1,270

25 October 1998

Featherstone Rovers	54 – 10	Limoux
Try: Dickins (2), Pratt (2), Spurr (2), Chapman, Stokes, Swinson; Goal: Chapman (9)		Try: Lacans, Rossel; Goal: Masson

Attendance: 804

25 October 1998

Lancashire Lynx	26 – 18	St-Estève
Try: Gee, Campbell, Murray, Parsley; Goal: P. Jones (3)		Try: Boudebza, Garcia, Guisset, Verges; Goal: Couttet

Attendance: 247

=== Final ===
1 November 1998

Villeneuve	16 – 10	Lancashire Lynx
Try: Cornut, Doorey, Frayssinous; Goal: Banquet (2)		Try: D. Jones, Taylor; Goal: P. Jones

Stade de Toulouse, Toulouse
Attendance: 10,283
Referee: Graham Shaw (Wigan)

FB	1	Frédéric Banquet
RW	2	Daniel Calvert
RC	3	Laurent Minut
LC	4	Laurent Frayssinous
LW	5	Gilles Cornut
SO	6	Fabien Devecchi (c)
SH	7	Steve Plath
PR	8	David Collado
HK	9	Vincent Wulf
PR	10	Paul Sironen
SR	11	Laurent Carrasco
SR	12	Pierre Sabatie
LF	13	Grant Doorey
Substitutions:
IC	14	Vea Bloomfield
IC	15	Emmanuel Peralta
IC	16	Christophe Canal
IC	17	Julien Rinaldi
Player-coach:
Grant Doorey

FB	1	Doc Murray
RW	2	David Jones
RC	3	Milton Finney
LC	4	Craig Campbell
LW	5	Neil Parsley
SO	6	Phil Jones
SH	7	Chris Kelly
PR	8	Steve Taylor
HK	9	Andy Ruane (c)
PR	10	Carl Briscoe
SR	11	Steve Gee
SR	12	Simon Smith
LF	13	Joe Walsh
Substitutions:
IC	14	Lee Prest
IC	15	Paul Norton
IC	16	Neil Briscoe
IC	17	P. J. Solomon
Coach:
Steve Hampson

== Aftermath ==
Despite some interest in staging the tournament again the following year, this didn't materialise and the Treize Tournoi was never repeated. In 1999, Villeneuve played a "European Challenge" match against a Northern Ford Premiership XIII at Widnes, winning the match 24–14.

In 2012, an Anglo-French Challenge competition took place, consisting of four fixtures between English Championship and French Elite One Championship clubs.
