= March (disambiguation) =

March is the third month of the year.

March, marches, or marching may also refer to:

== Marching ==
- Marching, the walking of military troops and such in procession according to a steady rhythm
- March, a parade or procession of people, animals, time, or objects
- The March (1945), death march during the final months of the Second World War in Europe
- Demonstration (protest), if held in the form of a procession over a long distance

== Places ==
- March, Iran, a village in Mazandaran Province, Iran

=== Europe ===
- March (territory) or "mark", border regions, of importance in the Medieval history of various countries
- March, Breisgau, a municipality in the rural district of Breisgau-Hochschwarzwald, Germany
- March District, Switzerland
- Marches, Drôme, a commune in the Drôme department in France
- Morava (river), German name March, a river in Central Europe, tributary of the Danube

==== United Kingdom ====
- March, Cambridgeshire, a town in England
- Earl of March, earldoms in England and Scotland
- Welsh Marches, a region of the UK on and near the border between England and Wales

=== United States ===
- March, Minnesota, an unincorporated community in the United States
- March, Missouri, a community in the United States
- March Air Reserve Base, a military base in Riverside, California named after Peyton C. March, Jr.

== People ==
- March (surname), a surname (including a list of people and fictional characters with the surname)
- March Avery (born 1932), American painter
- March F. Chase (1876–1935), American chemical engineer
- March Fong Eu (1922–2017), American politician

== Arts, entertainment and media ==
=== Fictional characters ===
- March 7th (character) (三月七), a playable character in the video game Honkai: Star Rail

=== Literature and visual arts ===
- The Marches: Border Walks With My Father, 2016 book by British politician Rory Stewart
- March (novel), a novel by Geraldine Brooks
- The March (novel), 2005 historical fiction novel by E. L. Doctorow
- March (comics), a graphic novel trilogy about the Civil Rights Movement by U.S. Congressman John Lewis, Andrew Aydin, and Nate Powell
- March (painting), a painting by Isaaс Levitan
- March Entertainment, an animation production company
- M.Arch., Master of Architecture, a professional degree in architecture

=== Music ===
- March (music), a genre of music associated with marching cadences

==== Albums ====
- March (Lene Lovich album), an album by Lene Lovich
- March (Michael Penn album), an album by Michael Penn

==== Songs ====
- "March", by Avail from Satiate, 1992
- "March", by Basement from I Wish I Could Stay Here, 2011
- "March", by Cardiacs from Heaven Born and Ever Bright, 1992
- "March", by Come from Gently, Down the Stream, 1998
- "March", by George Tandy Jr.
- "March", by Lizzy McAlpine from Older, 2024
- "March", by North Sea Radio Orchestra from Leader of the Starry Skies: A Tribute to Tim Smith, Songbook 1, 2010
- "March", or "March of the Toy Soldiers", from The Nutcracker

== Other uses ==
- Banca March, Spanish bank
- March Engineering, a Formula One Team and racing car constructor
- Nissan March, a compact car
- March (restaurant), a restaurant in Houston, Texas
- MARCH (Japanese universities) (マーチ, Māchi), the collective name of 5 private universities located in Tokyo, Japan
- Medically Aware and Responsible Citizens of Hyderabad (MARCH)

== See also ==
- Marcha (disambiguation)
- Marche (disambiguation)
- Marsch (disambiguation)
- The March (disambiguation)
