= Ernst March =

German pottery manufacturer

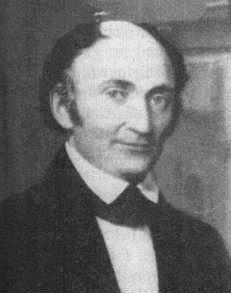
Ernst March (date unknown)

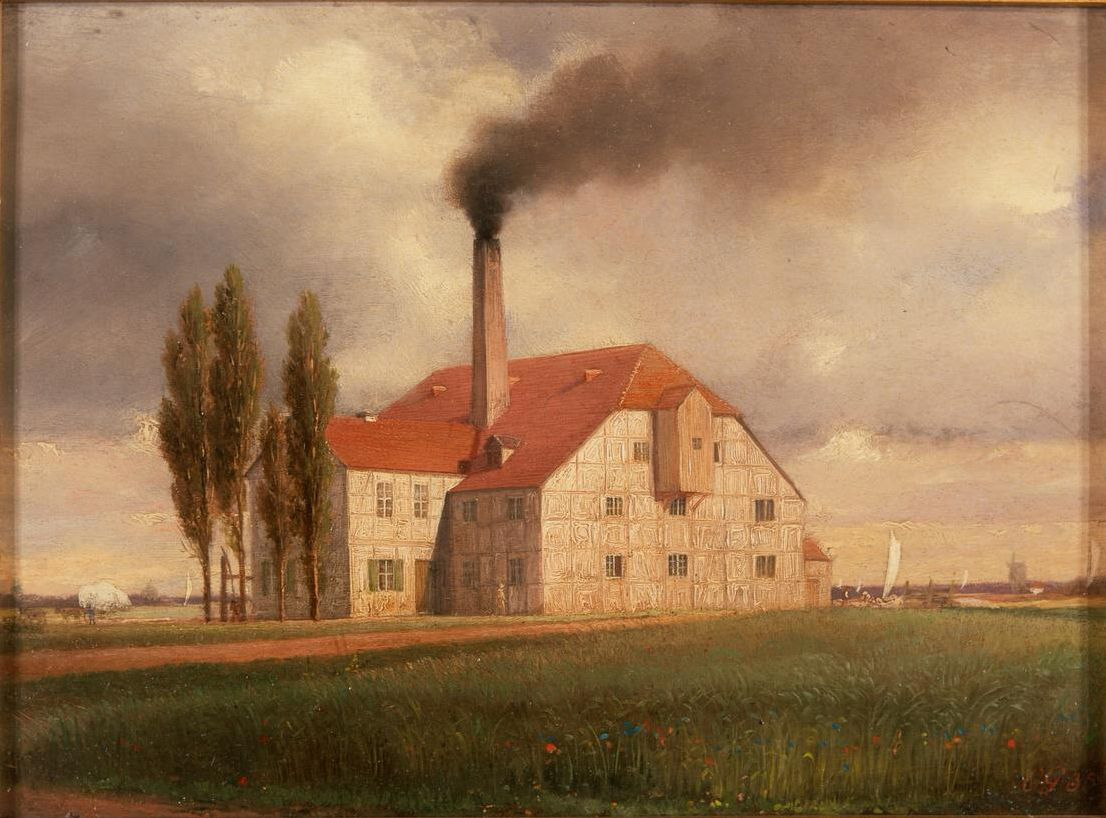
His pottery factory in Charlottenburg (1835); painting by Eduard Gaertner

Ernst March (30 June 1798, Panknin - 14 December 1847, Berlin) was a German pottery manufacturer.

== Life and work ==
After an apprenticeship as a potter, with Tobias Feilner, he was briefly a partner in Feilner's company. Later, he founded his own company, the "Marchsche Tonwarenfabrik", in Charlottenburg. The land where the factory and workers' residences were located is now part of the north campus at Technische Universität Berlin.

Initially, the factory made simple industrial ceramic items, including molds for the sugar industry. In the early 1840s, it began to specialize in terracotta and majolica production. He eventually became the leading terracotta producer, exceeding the output from the factory owned by Feilner, who had died in 1839. The architect, Friedrich August Stüler, used March's terracotta bricks and forms for the nearby St.-Matthäus-Kirche, and developed new uses for them at the Neues Museum.

In 1846, he oversaw the process of creating terracotta columns for the atrium in the garden at the Orangerieschloss in Potsdam, designed by Ludwig Persius. Due to the heat and a draft, he caught what was assumed to be a cold, but it degenerated into kidney and lung ailments. He was ill for more than a year, then died in the winter of 1847.

After his death, his widow Sophie maintained the business. From 1865, their sons Paul and Emil ran the company under the name "Ernst March & Söhne Tonwarenfabrik". Their high-quality terracotta was used in many well known buildings, including the Berliner Kunstgewerbemuseum, the Berlin Görlitzer Bahnhof and the Rotes Rathaus. Their youngest son, Otto, became an architect as did Otto's sons, Walter and Werner.

By 1896, the company employed 150 workers and used 1,500 tons of clay annually. In 1902, the factory merged with similar companies to form the "Deutsche Ton- und Steinzeugwerke AG" (clay and stoneware factories). The facilities in Charlottenburg were abandoned.

== Sources ==
- Hans-Henning Zabel (1990). "March, Ernst". Neue Deutsche Biographie (in German). Vol. 16. Berlin: Duncker & Humblot. pp. 109–110. (full text online).
- The March family @ the Bezirksamts Charlottenburg-Wilmersdorf
