= Deutsches Stadion (Berlin) =

Former stadium in Berlin, Germany

Coordinates: 52°30′53″N 13°14′21″E

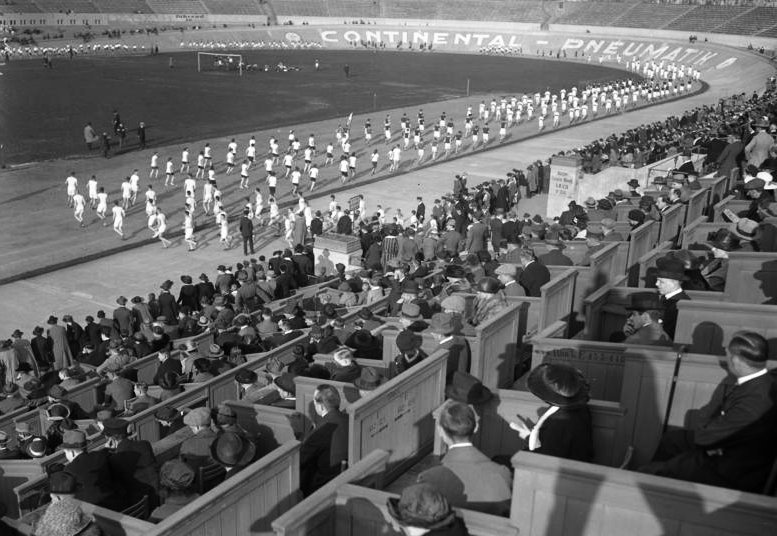
- View from the boxes on the grandstand (1923)
- Interactive map of Deutsches Stadion
- Full name: Deutsches Stadion
- Location: Berlin, Germany
- Capacity: 64,000

Construction
- Opened: 8 June 1913
- Closed: 1934
- Architect: Otto March

Deutsches Stadion was a multi-use sports stadium in Berlin, Germany. It was located at Deutsches Sportforum in the present-day Westend quarter on the northern rim of the large Grunewald forest. Built according to plans designed by Otto March, it was opened on 8 June 1913, on the occasion of Emperor Wilhelm II's silver jubilee, due to host the 1916 Summer Olympics that were cancelled after the outbreak of World War I. The stadium was demolished 20 years later and replaced by the current Olympiastadion.

== History ==
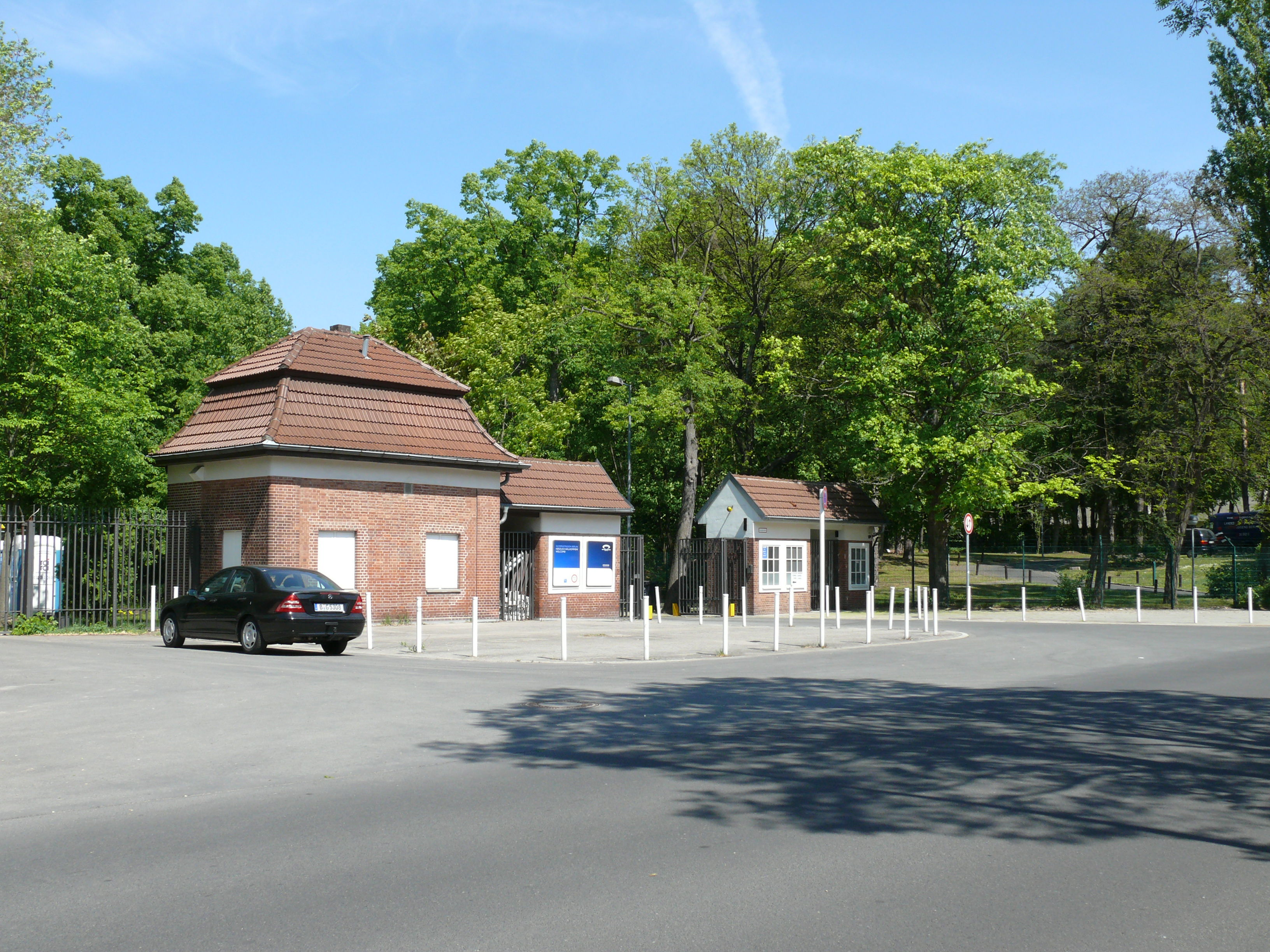
Ticket booths on Jesse-Owens-Allee

From 1907 the terrain on the sandy Teltow plateau between the Heerstraße road and the Spree river, west of the then independent city of Charlottenburg, was leased to the Union-Klub horse racing organisation. The aristocratic association had the Berliner Rennverein established to lay out a large race-course (Rennbahn Grunewald) at the site, designed by Otto March, which was inaugurated on 23 May 1909 in the presence of Emperor Wilhelm II (progressively arriving in a motor car) and his consort Augusta Victoria. A nearby Rennbahn railway station on the Spandau Suburban Line opened on the same day.

Even at this stage, the German government prepared for hosting Olympic Games, and March's plans already provided a large space within the 2,400 m (7,900 ft) circuit, accessible via a tunnel and suitable for the construction of a proposed stadium. Up to today, the tunnel and the old ticket booths survive on Jesse-Owens-Allee. When during the 1912 Summer Olympics the city of Berlin was designated by the International Olympic Committee (IOC) to host the 1916 Olympic Games, the Rennbahn area was designated as the central venue for this event and the officials hired the same architect who originally had built the racing track, Otto March.

After delays due to financial difficulties, the construction of the Deutsches Stadion, then also known as Grunewald-Stadion, was completed within 200 days in 1913. The facilities arose in the lowered central ground (Erdstadion), allowing further horse races as the upper circuit remained completely observable for spectators. Horse races continued until the demolition of the whole premises in 1934. Otto March did not live to see the opening, as he died during the construction works on April 1. The stadium was solemnly inaugurated on 8 June; at the same day, the Stadion station of the Berlin U-Bahn opened near the eastern entrance.

According to the construction plans by Otto March the Deutsches Stadion would follow the model of construction of the White City Stadium main venue of the 1908 Summer Olympics held in London. The stadium was equipped with a 600-metre running track with a 665-metre velodrome outside. Next to the football pitch was installed a 100-metre track and outside to the velodrome would be installed a 100 metre by 22 metres swimming pool, decorated with numerous statues by Ludwig Cauer, Sascha Schneider, August Kraus, Georg Kolbe, et al. The official capacity of the stadium was 33,000 spectators.

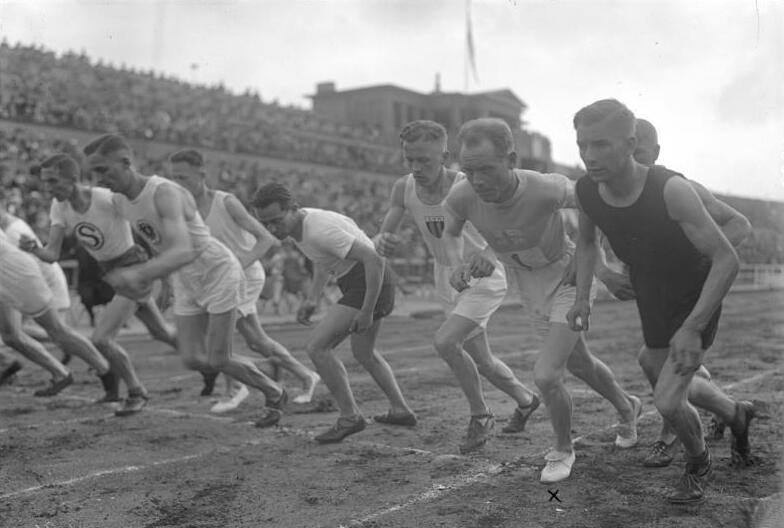
Paavo Nurmi (2nd from right) getting started to run the 3000 metres, May 1926

However, as the 1916 Olympic Games were cancelled upon the outbreak of World War I, the arena was temporarily used as a military hospital from 1915. After the war, it was initially used for matches of the Germany national football team as well as for the stadium of German football championship finals from 1922 to 1924 and again in 1927. During the final on 10 June 1923, about 64,000 spectators witnessed the 3:0 victory of Hamburger SV over the Berlin team SC Union 06 Oberschöneweide. On 24 May 1926, the Finnish runner Paavo Nurmi set another world record at 3000 metres. The public celebrations of Reich President Paul von Hindenburg's 80th birthday were held here on 2 October 1927; Adolf Hitler spoke at the stadium during his 1932 campaign trail on 27 June.

In 1920 the campus of a sports college (Deutsche Hochschule für Leibesübungen, DHfL), a branch of the Berlin Frederick William University initiated by Carl Diem and Theodor Lewald, was instituted in the premises of the swimming arena. The first newly erected buildings of a sports research facility, the present Deutsches Sportforum (German Sport Forum), dedicated to the teaching of professors of physical education and the study of sport science were built northeast of the stadium site. From 1926 to 1929, Otto March's sons Werner and Walter March were assigned to build an annex for these institutions, though due to the Great Depression the finalization was delayed until 1936.

In 1931, the International Olympic Committee made Berlin the host city of the 11th Summer Olympics. Originally, the German government decided merely to restore the Deutsches Stadion, with Werner March retained to do this. However, when the Nazis came to power in 1933, they decided to use the Olympic Games in 1936 for propaganda purposes. With these plans in mind, Hitler ordered the construction of a great sports complex in Grunewald named the "Reichssportfeld" with a totally new Olympiastadion. Architect Werner March remained in charge of the project, assisted by his brother Walter.
