= John March =

John March may refer to:

- John March (colonel), businessman and colonel in the Massachusetts Bay militia
- John March (barrister), English barrister and legal writer
- John March (bishop), Canadian bishop

== See also ==
- Jack March, American tennis player and promoter
