= David March =

David March may refer to:

- David March (actor) (1925-1999), English actor
- David March (rugby league) (born 1979), English former professional rugby league footballer
