= Marcha (disambiguation) =

Marcha (born 1956) is a Dutch singer and television presenter.

Marcha may also refer to:

- Marcha (newspaper), a former Uruguayan weekly
- La Movida Madrileña, a Spanish countercultural movement

== See also ==
- March (disambiguation)
- Marche (disambiguation)
