= Grant Doorey =

Australian rugby league footballer

Personal information
- Born: 3 February 1968 (age 58) Sydney, New South Wales, Australia

Playing information
- Position: Second-row
Club
Years	Team	Pld	T	G	FG	P
1990–91	Manly Sea Eagles	9	1	0	0	4
1993	Eastern Suburbs	1	0	0	0	0
1994–97	Keighley Cougars	83	14	0	0	56
1997–02	Villeneuve
	Total	93	15	0	0	60

Coaching information
Club
Years	Team	Gms	W	D	L	W%
1997–02	Villeneuve

Grant Doorey (born 3 February 1968) is an Australian professional rugby union coach and former professional rugby league footballer.

== Playing career ==
Doorey started his career in Australia, appearing sporadically for Manly-Warringah and Eastern Suburbs between 1990 and 1993. He moved to England in 1994 to play for Keighley Cougars where he played close to 100 games over 4 seasons including being Centenary player of the year and being part of the squad winning the 2nd division trophy in 1995.

In 1997, Doorey moved to France to become a player-coach at Villeneuve, where he won the Treize Tournoi in 1998, and a European Challenge match against a Northern Ford Premiership XIII in 1999. Doorey was elected Coach of the year by the FFRX111 3 times in his 4 yrs in France after leading Villeneuve as head Coach to 7 titles in 4 years including the triple Cup Euro Cup and Championship in 1998, and 2 other occasions Cup and Championship winners. In 2001, he reached the quarter-final of the Challenge Cup with the team before losing to Super League side Warrington Wolves.

== Coaching career ==
After leaving Villeneuve, Doorey later moved to rugby union, where we worked in 2003 for Bourgoin CSBJ with Phillipe Saint Andre and Laurent Seigne and Francis Leta in the French Top 14 competition, Doorey moved to Italy in 2003 as an assistant coach alongside John Kirwan for the Italy including RWC 2003 and 6 nations championships in 2004 and 2005, helping Italy to its highest ranking of 9 in the IRB rankings. He went back to CSBJ in France for 2005-2006 leading CSBJ in the Top 14 with Christophe Urios gaining 2 European Cup qualifications before again joining Kirwan in 2007 with Japan RWC 2007 where he stayed until 2011, winning PNC championships in 2011 and taking Japan from 17 in the IRB rankings to 11 prior to RWC 2011, its highest ranking ever to date. In 2012 joined Kirwan to be assistant coach with the New Zealand Rugby Union of Blues where he coached for 3 years helping produce numerous new All Blacks including Frank Halai, Francis Saili, Charles Piutau and George Moala in the worldwide Super Rugby competition. In 2015, he was appointed as an assistant coach at London Irish.and in 2016 was appointed as consultant coach at Toulon RCT helping Diego Dominguez as skills and defence coach in preparation for the 2016 season. Doorey has also periodically worked as a consultant coach for Mitsubishi Heavy industries as a defence consultant, for IRANZ as a specialist coach and Auckland rugby as a coach education facilitator.
