= The March =

The March man refer to:

- Bataan Death March in the Philippines during World War II
- March on Washington for Jobs and Freedom, a 1963 civil rights event
- Salt March, when Gandhi in 1930 walked to protest the British salt tax in India
- Sherman's March to the Sea during the American Civil War
- Long March in China in the 1930s
- The March (1945), forced marches across Europe by Allied POWs during World War II
- The March (novel), a book by E. L. Doctorow about Sherman's March to the Sea
- The March (album), an album by Unearth
- The March (1964 film), a documentary film by James Blue about the 1963 March on Washington for Jobs and Freedom
- The March (1990 film), a film aired by the BBC1 in 1990
- The March (2013 film), a documentary film, also about the 1963 March on Washington for Jobs
- The March (Friday Night Lights), an episode of the TV series Friday Night Lights

== See also ==
- Marche, or "The Marches", a region of Italy
- March (disambiguation)
