= Marsch =

Marsch may refer to:

== People ==
- Eckart Marsch (born 1947), German physicist
- Jesse Marsch (born 1973), American soccer player

== Other uses ==
- Der Marsch zum Führer, a Nazi propaganda film released in 1940
- Gaisburger Marsch, traditional Swabian beef stew
- Marsh Railway (German: Marschbahn), a rail line in Germany
- Weser Marsch, a district of Lower Saxony, Germany

== See also ==
- March (disambiguation)
- Marsh (disambiguation)
- Mersch
