= Otto March =

German architect

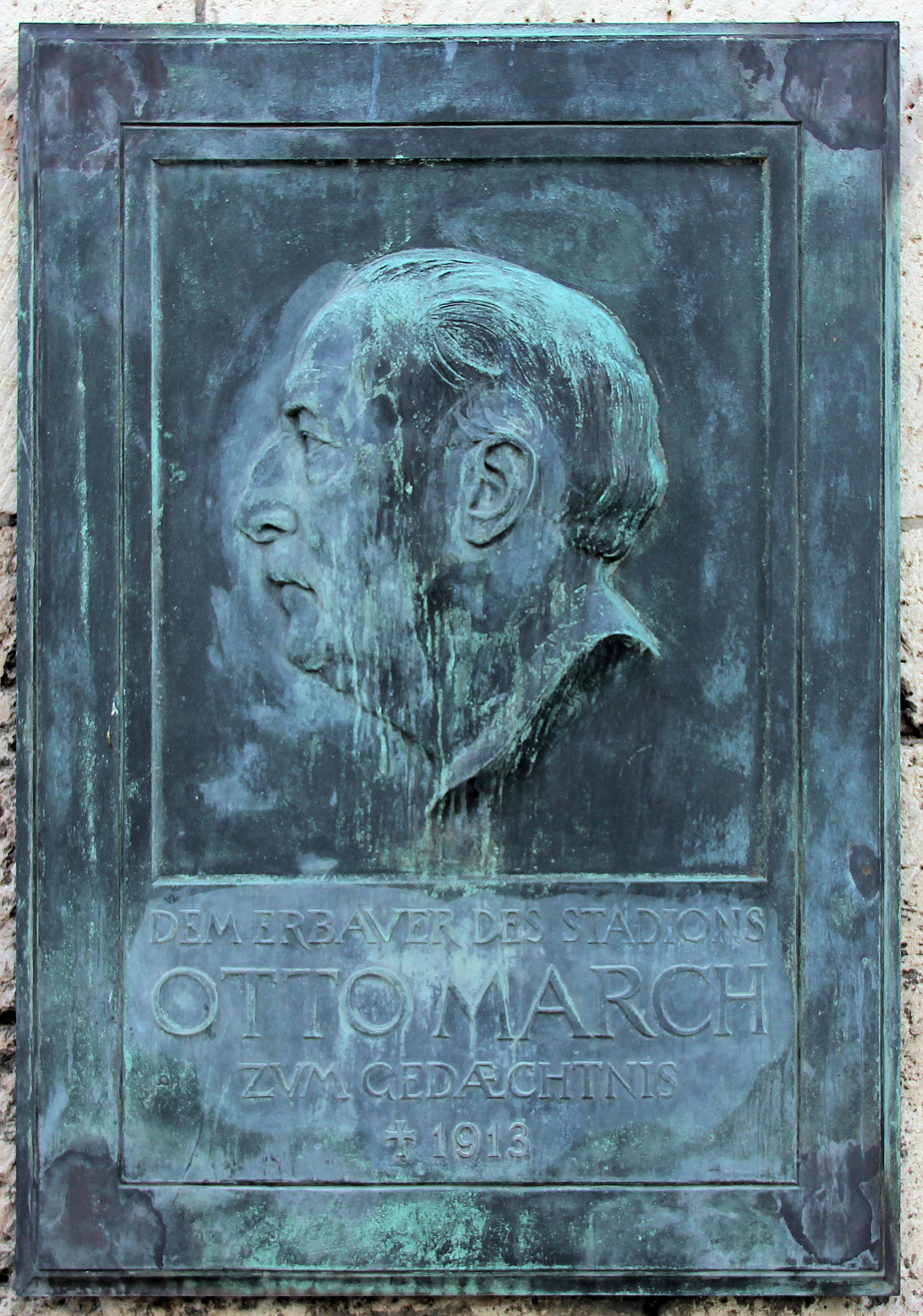
Otto March plaque

Otto March (7 October 1845 – April 1913) was a German architect and father of architects Werner March (1894–1976) and Walter March (1898–1969).

== Biography ==
Otto Jakob March was born in Charlottenburg, to the pottery manufacturer, Ernst March.

Numerous residential and commercial buildings and churches throughout Germany were built on March's designs. He designed the Deutsches Stadion, built for the 1916 Olympic Games. March married Anna Marie Vorster (born 1863 in Cologne), daughter of Julius Vorster. The couple had four sons. Two of them, Werner and Walter, became architects and designed the Olympiastadion for the 1936 Olympic Games. Otto March is credited with cultivating the interest of his young nephew Werner Hegemann in city planning. Hegemann became an influential city planner, author, critic of the Nazis, and editor of the architectural journal, Wasmuths Monatshefte für Baukunst.

March died in Berlin in early April 1913.
