= Olympiastadion (Berlin) =

Sports stadium in Berlin, Germany

Coordinates: 52°30′53″N 13°14′22″E

Olympiastadion Berlin

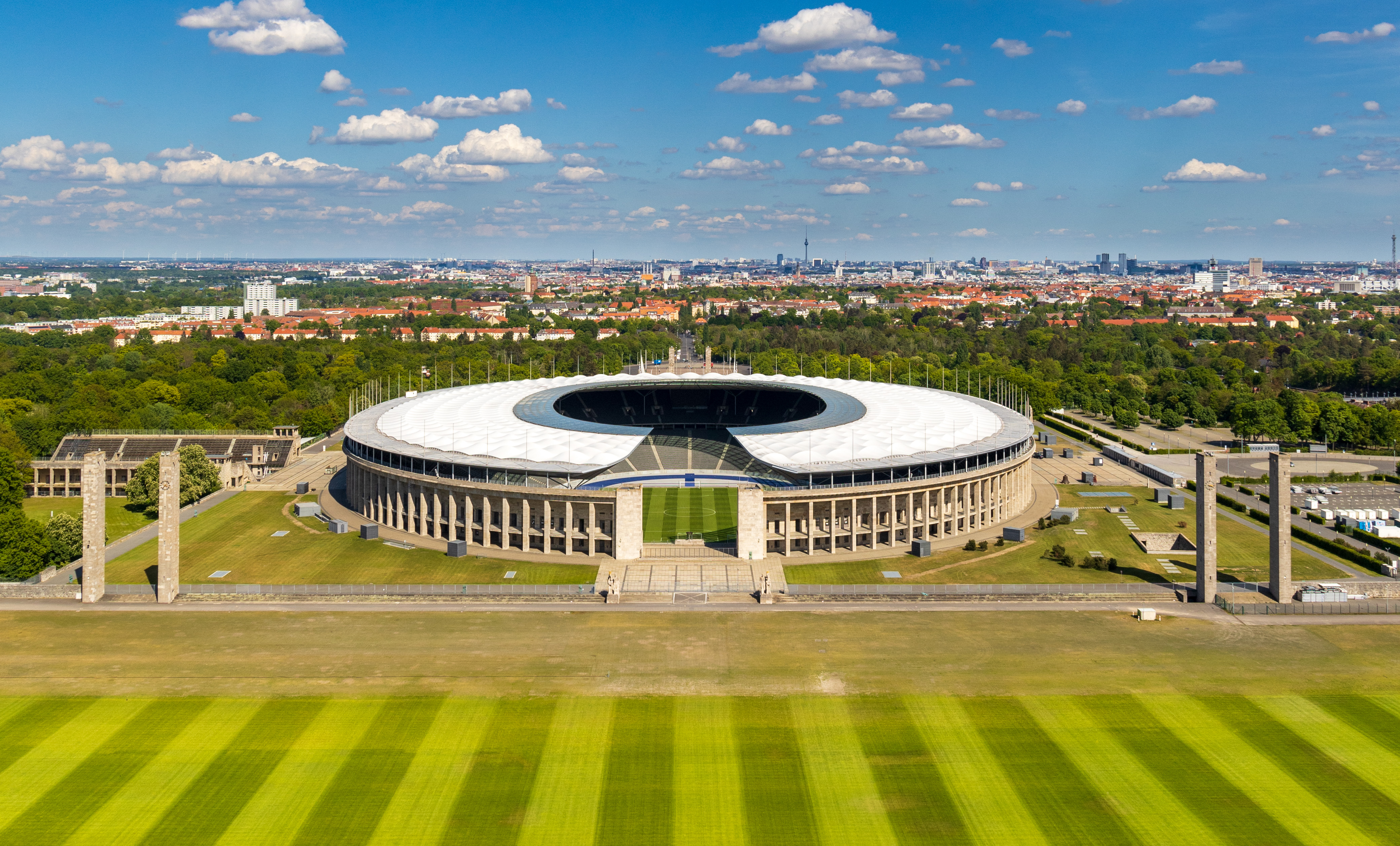
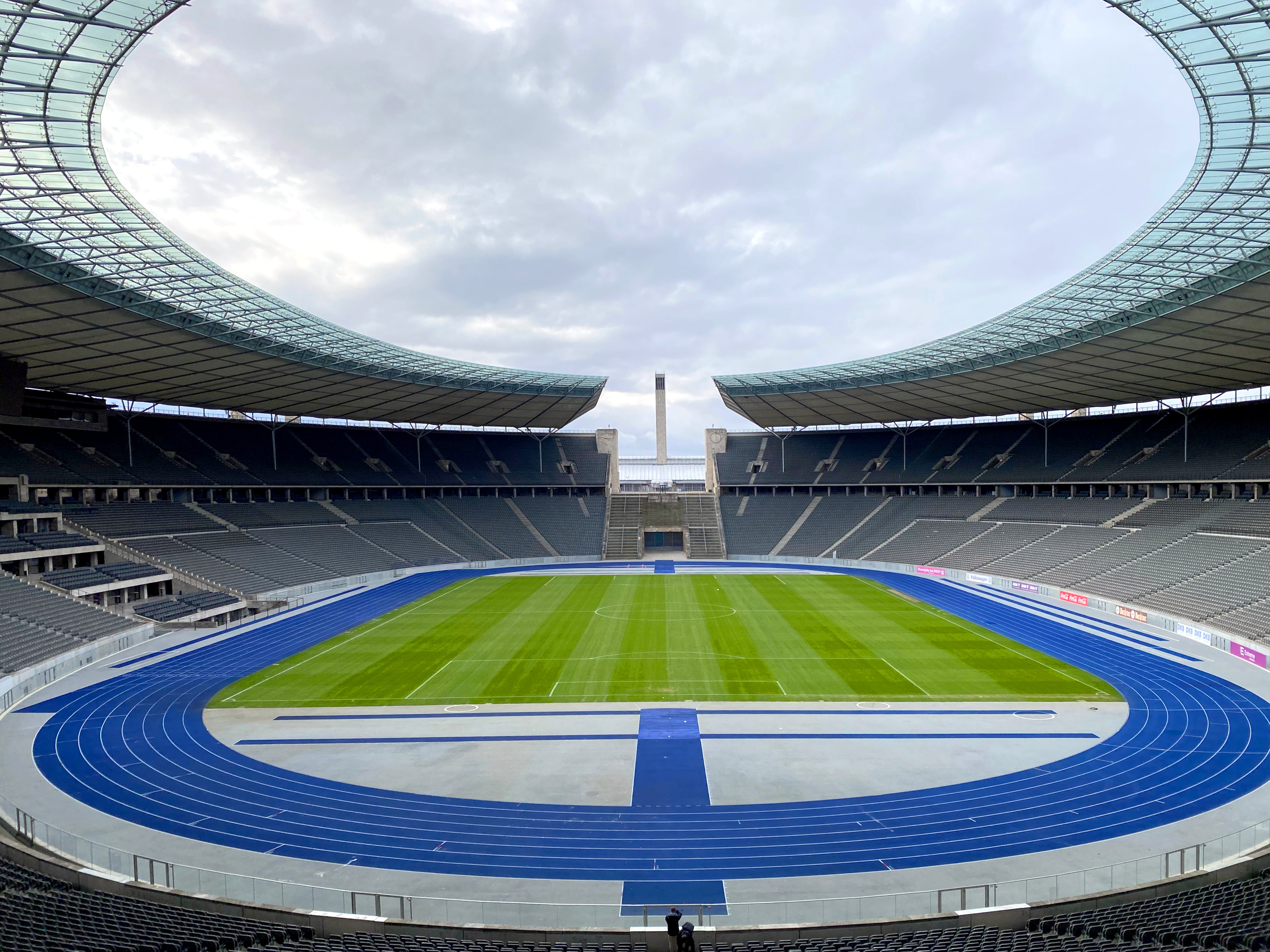
- UEFA
- Interactive map of Olympiastadion Berlin
- Full name: Olympiastadion Berlin
- Former names: Deutsches Stadion
- Location: Westend, Charlottenburg-Wilmersdorf, Berlin, Germany
- Owner: Government of Berlin
- Operator: Olympiastadion Berlin GmbH
- Capacity: 74,475
- Executive suites: 65
- Surface: Grass
- Record attendance: 95,000 (Metallica; 30 May 2026)
- Field size: 105 × 68 m
- Public transit: Olympia-Stadion (U-Bahn); Olympiastadion (S-Bahn)

Construction
- Built: 1934–1936
- Opened: 1 August 1936
- Renovated: 1974 (reconfiguration); 2000–2004 (World Cup)
- Cost: 43 million ℛ︁ℳ︁ (1936) €297 million (2016)
- Architects: Werner March/Albert Speer (1936); Friedrich Wilhelm Krahe (1974)

Tenants
- Hertha BSC (1963–1986, 1988–present); 1. FC Union Berlin (2021, 2023); Germany national team (selected matches); SC Tasmania 1900 Berlin (1965–1966); Tennis Borussia Berlin (1974–1975, 1976–1977); Blau-Weiß 1890 Berlin (1984–1990); Berlin Thunder (2003–2007)

Website
- olympiastadion.berlin

Olympiastadion (German pronunciation: [oˈlʏmpi̯aˌʃtaːdi̯ɔn]), also known in English as the Berlin Olympic Stadium or simply the Olympic Stadium, is a sports stadium at Olympiapark Berlin in Berlin, Germany. It was originally designed by Werner March for the 1936 Summer Olympics. During the Olympics, the record attendance was thought to be over 100,000.

Since renovations in 2004, the Olympiastadion has a permanent capacity of 74,475 seats and is the largest stadium in Germany for international football matches. The Olympiastadion is a UEFA category four stadium.

Besides its use as an athletics stadium, the arena has built a footballing tradition. Since 1963, it has been the home of the Hertha BSC. It hosted three matches in the 1974 FIFA World Cup. It was renovated for the 2006 FIFA World Cup, when it hosted six matches, including the final. The DFB-Pokal final match is held each year there since 1985. The Olympiastadion Berlin served as a host for the 2011 FIFA Women's World Cup as well as the 2015 UEFA Champions League final.

It hosted six games in UEFA Euro 2024, including the final.

== History ==
=== 1916–1934: Deutsches Stadion ===
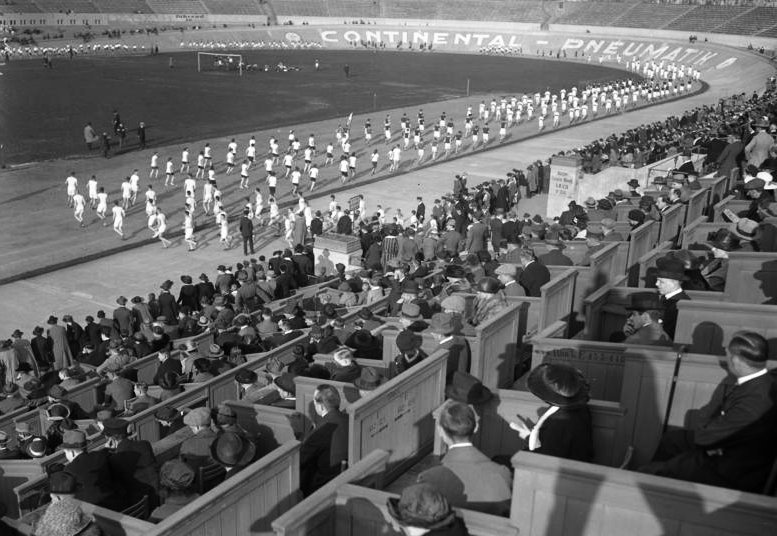
Deutsches Stadion in 1923

During the 1912 Summer Olympics, the city of Berlin was designated by the International Olympic Committee (IOC) to host the 1916 Summer Olympics. Germany's proposed stadium for this event was to be located in Charlottenburg, in the Grunewald Forest, to the west of Berlin—thus the stadium was also known as Grunewaldstadion. A horse racing-course already existed there which belonged to the Berliner Rennverein, and even today the old ticket booths survive on the current Jesse-Owens-Allee. The government of Germany decided not to build in the nearby Grunewald forest, or to renovate buildings that already existed. Because of this desire, they hired the same architect who originally had built the "Rennverein", Otto March.

March decided to build the stadium under the ground ("Erdstadion", in German). However, the 1916 Olympic Games were cancelled due to World War I. In the 1920s the first buildings of a school, the "Deutsches Sportforum" (German Sport Forum), dedicated to the teaching of professors of physical education and the study of sport science were built northeast of the stadium site. From 1926 to 1929, Otto March's sons (Werner and Walter) were assigned to build an annex for these institutions, though the finalization was delayed until 1936.

=== 1936–1945: Olympiastadion ===
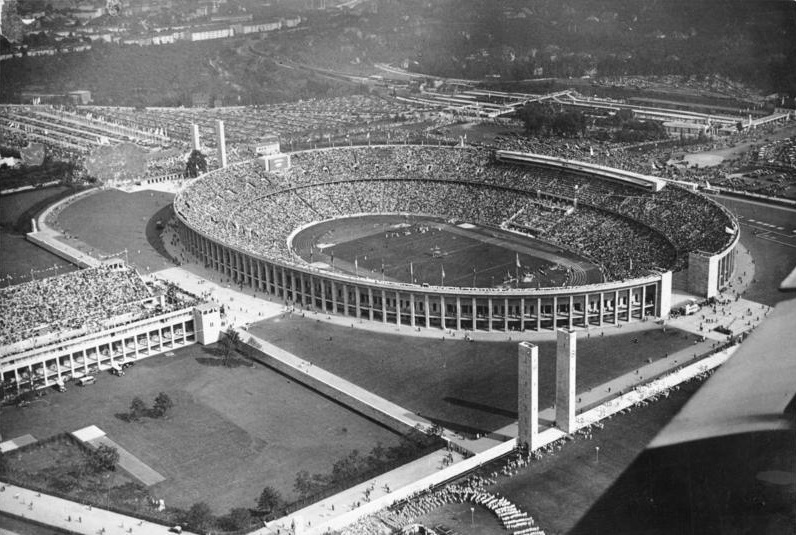
The stadium in 1936

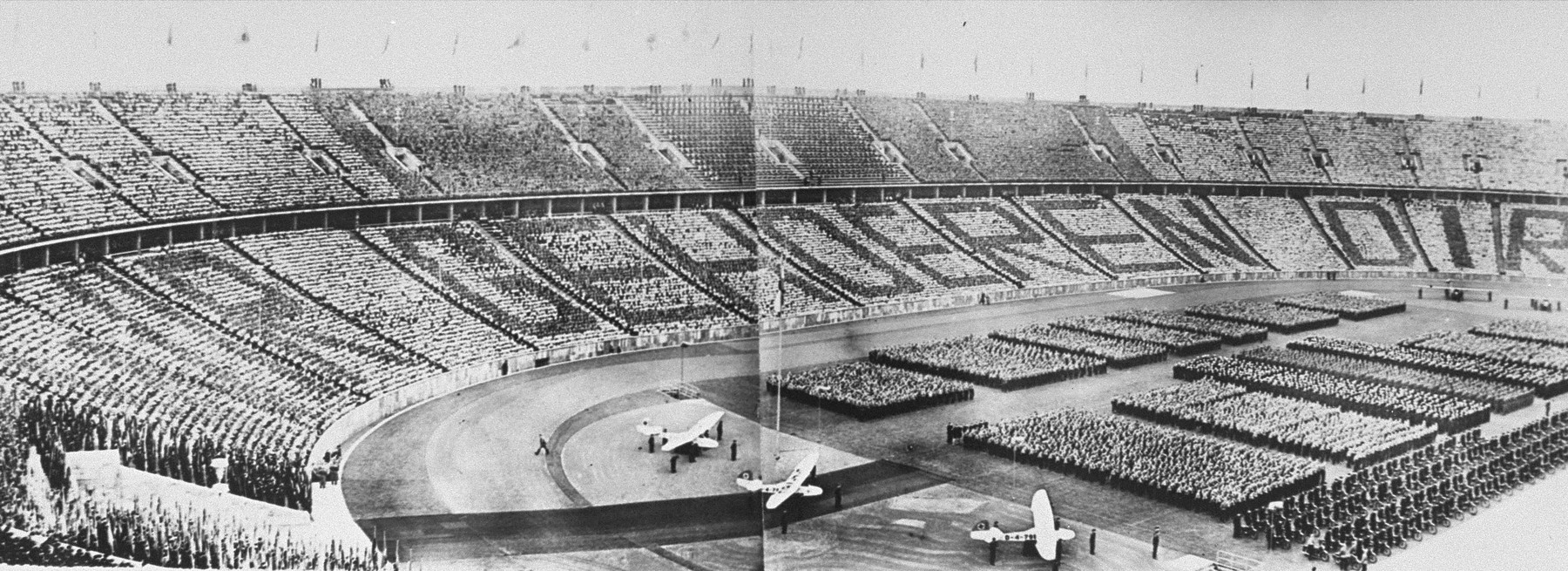
On May Day in 1939, the Führer of Nazi Germany, Adolf Hitler addressed the Hitler youth (HJ) at the Olympic Stadium. The dark jackets of the BdM between the white blouses of the boys of the HJ formed the words WIR GEHÖREN DIR (lit. "WE BELONG (TO) YOU", meaning "We are yours").

In 1931, the International Olympic Committee selected Berlin to host the 11th Summer Olympics. Originally, the German government decided merely to restore the earlier Olympiastadion of 1916, with Werner March again retained to do this.

When the Nazi Party won the election in Germany in 1933, they decided to use the Olympic Games to build a new stadium and Olympic Complex for Berlin in 1936. Führer and Reich Chancellor Adolf Hitler ordered the construction of a great sports complex in Grunewald named the "Reichssportfeld" with a new Olympiastadion. Architect Werner March remained in charge of the project, assisted by his brother Walter. The complex, including the Olympiastadion, was commissioned by the Nazi government and constructed between 1934 and 1936 using state funds. Although the Grunewald area once included royal hunting grounds, by the time of construction, the land was under government control and the stadium was state-owned.

Construction took place from 1934 to 1936. When the Reichssportfeld was finished, it was 132 hectares (330 acres). It consisted of (east to west): the Olympiastadion, the Maifeld (Mayfield, capacity of 50,000) and the Waldbühne amphitheatre (capacity of 25,000), in addition to various places, buildings and facilities for different sports (such as football, swimming, equestrian events, and field hockey) in the northern part.

Werner March built the new Olympiastadion on the foundation of the original Deutsches Stadion, once again with the lower half of the structure recessed 12 metres (40 feet) below ground level.

The capacity of the Olympiastadion reached 110,000 spectators. It also possessed a VIP stand. At its end, aligned with the symmetrically designed layout of the buildings of the Olympischer Platz and toward the Maifeld, was the Marathon Gate with a big receptacle for the Olympic Flame.

==== Maifeld ====
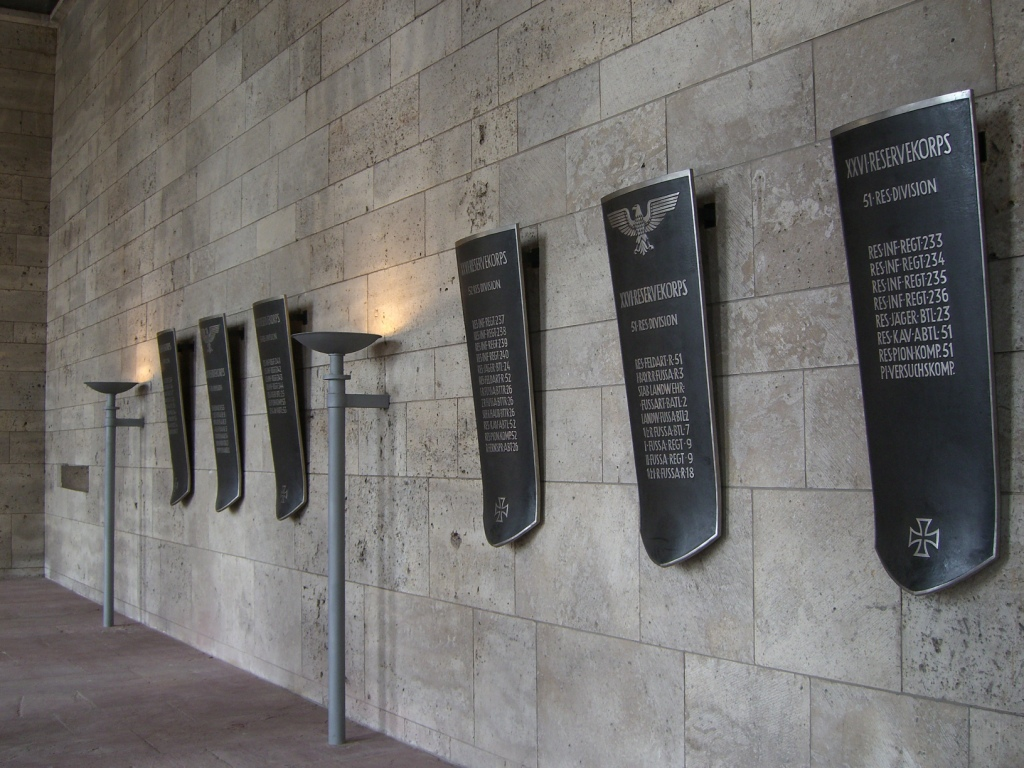
The Langemarck-Halle

The Maifeld (Mayfield) was created as a huge lawn (11.2 hectares, 28 acres) for gymnastic demonstrations, specifically annual May Day celebrations by the government. The area was surrounded by 19 metres of land elevation (62 ft), even though the Olympiastadion (to the east) was only 17 metres (55 ft) high. The total capacity was 250,000 people, with 60,000 in the large stands that extended at the west end.

Also located there were the Langemarck-Halle (below) and the Bell Tower (rising high). The walls were built with sturdy stone from the area of the Lower Alps, and also feature equine sculptures (work of Josef Wackerle). This consisted of huge halls built under the stands of the Maifeld. Pillars were raised on which hung flags and shields commemorating all the forces that participated in a battle fought in Langemark (West Flanders, Belgium) on 10 November 1914, during the First World War. Since 2006, the ground floor is home to a public exhibit providing historical information on the area of the former Reichssportfeld.

During the 1936 Olympics, the Maifeld was used for polo and equestrian dressage events.

After the Second World War, the occupying forces of the British Army (Berlin Infantry Brigade) annually celebrated the King's or Queen's Official Birthday on the Maifeld and used it for a variety of sporting activities including cricket. Starting in 2012, Maifeld became home to the cricket clubs of Berlin.

==== Bell Tower ====
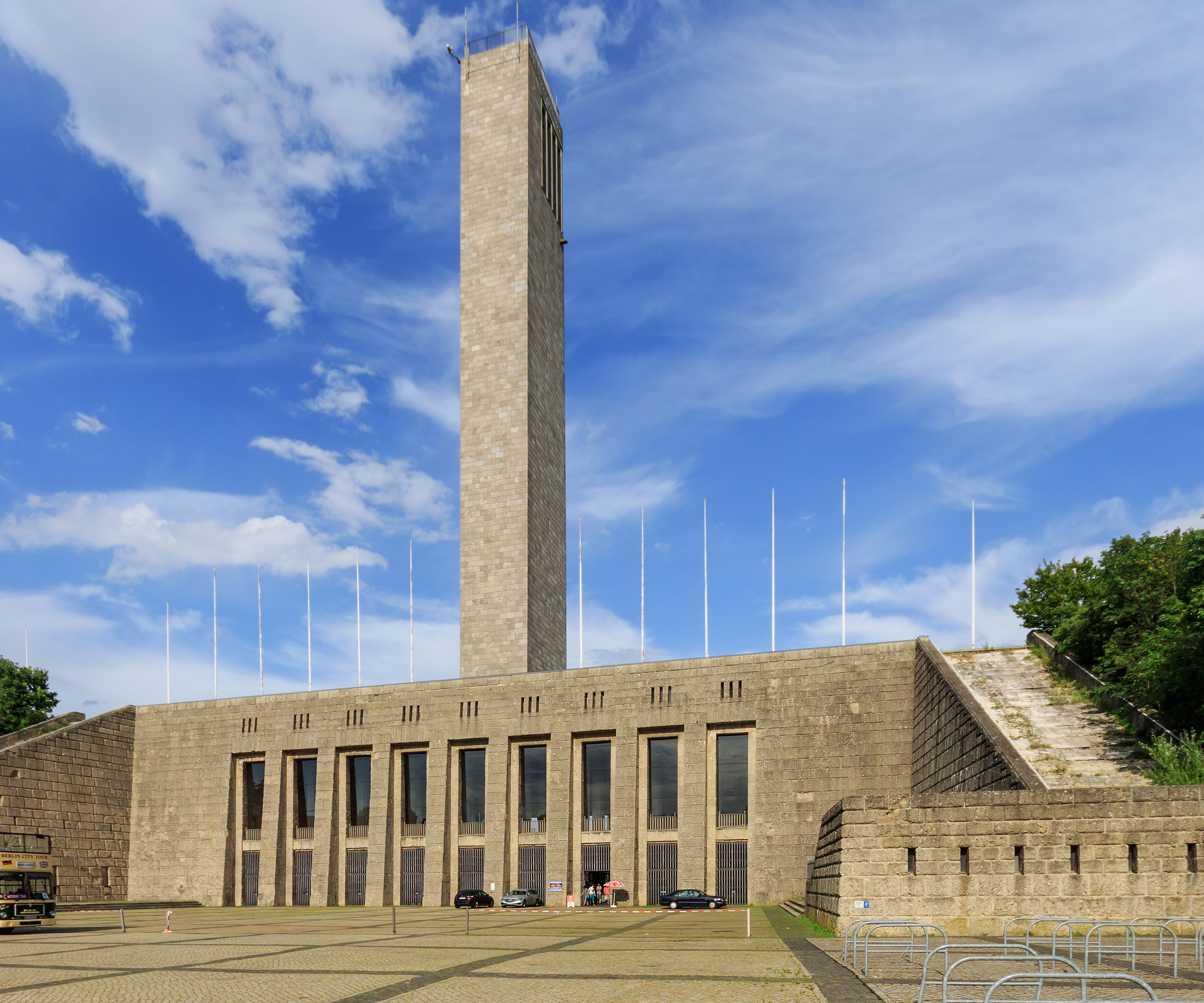
Bell tower exterior view

The Bell Tower crowned the western end of the Reichssportfeld planted amid the tiers of the Maifeld stands. It was 77 metres (247 ft) high. From its peak could be observed the whole city of Berlin. During the games, it was used as an observation post by administrators, police officials, doctors, and the media.

In the tower was the Olympic Bell. On its surface were the Olympic rings with an eagle, the year 1936, the Brandenburg Gate, the date 1–16 August in German, a motto between two swastikas: "I call the youth of the world" also in German, and 11. Olympic Games Berlin – although the games were the 10th (Summer) Olympics, they were the Games of the XI Olympiad.

The most significant battle around the Olympiastadion was in April 1945 when the Soviet army fought to capture it. This was during the final battle of the Second World War in Europe, with the total invasion of Berlin as the Allies' target. The Olympiastadion survived the war almost untouched; it only suffered the impact of machine gun shots.

The Bell Tower was the only part of the Reichssportfeld that was destroyed in the war. The Third Reich used the tower's structure to store archives (such as films). The Soviet troops accidentally set its contents on fire, turning the tower into a makeshift chimney. The structure was severely damaged and weakened.

In 1947, the British engineers demolished the tower. The Olympic Bell (which had survived the fire and remained in its place in the tower) fell 77 metres and cracked and has been incapable of sounding since then. In 1956, the bell was rescued, only to be used as a practice target for shooting with anti-tank ammunition. The damaged old bell survives and serves as a memorial.

A reconstruction of the tower was built between 1960 and 1962, once again by the architect Werner March, following the original blueprints. The present tower became an important tourist destination offering a panorama of Berlin, Spandau, the Havel Valley, Potsdam, Nauen and Hennigsdorf.

=== 1945–1990: West Berlin era ===
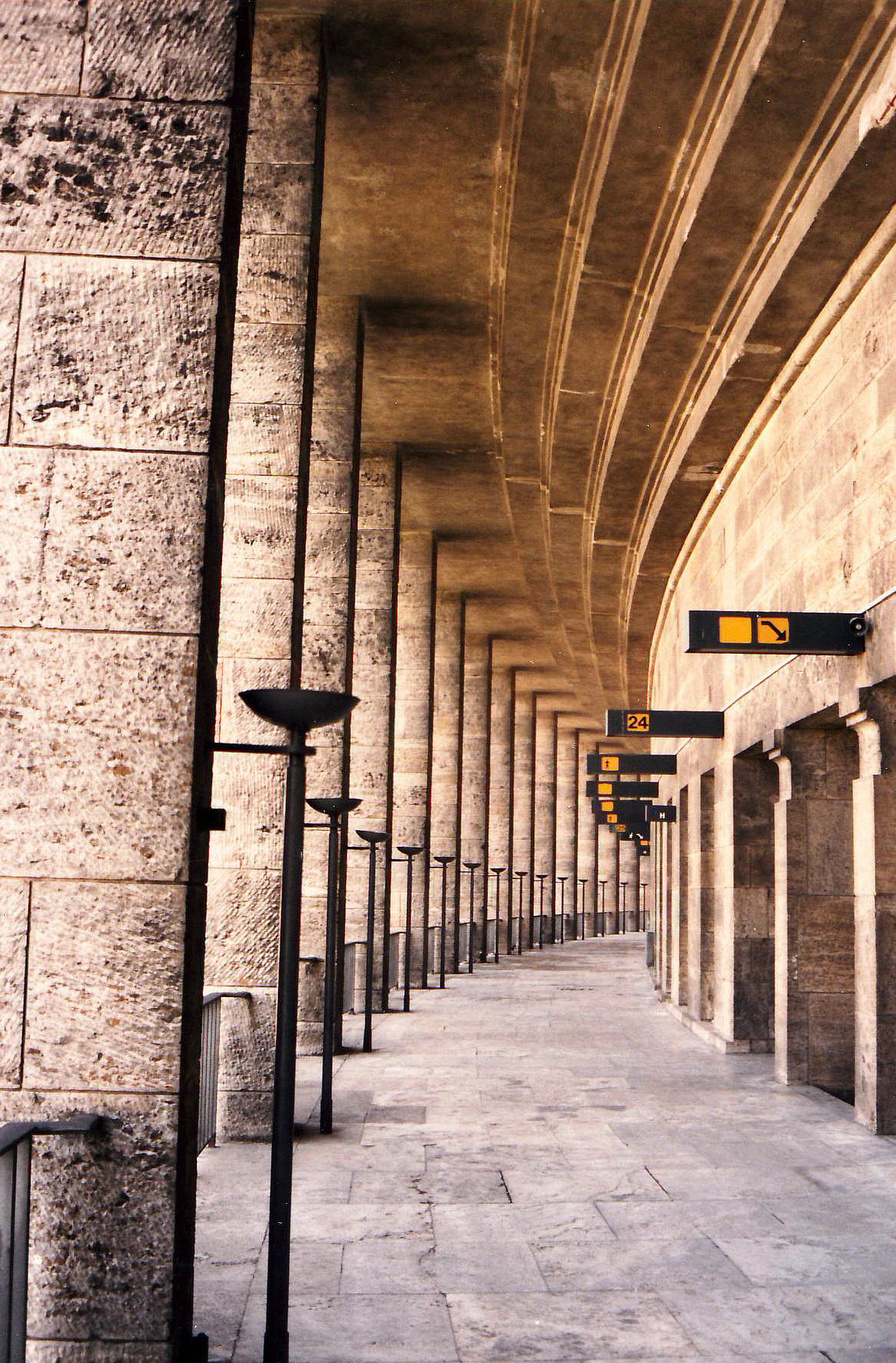
The Olympiastadion in 1993, its prewar architecture intact

After the war, the former Reichssportfeld became the headquarters of the British military occupation forces. The administration settled in the northeastern buildings designed by the March brothers in the 1920s, which the Third Reich had used for official sport organisations such as the Reich Academy of Physical Training and extended by 1936, adding the "Haus des deutschen Sports" (House of German Sports) and other buildings (which belong since 1994 to the Olympiapark Berlin, a central sporting facility of the City of Berlin). Soon, the British forces renovated war-damaged buildings but also converted interiors to their specific needs (one gymnasium was converted into a dining hall, another into a garage). From 1951 to 2005, the Olympischer Platz had a giant antenna transmitting for all the portable radios in Berlin.

From then until 1994 and their departure, British forces held an annual celebration of the Queen's Official Birthday in the Maifeld with thousands of spectators from Berlin present. During the 1960s, American military and high school football teams introduced hundreds of thousands of Berliners to American football at the stadium in exhibition games.

During those years, Bundesliga football matches were played in the Olympiastadion, with Hertha BSC as the local team. In the Maifeld, several competitions of football, rugby and polo were staged too. In the summers, the Waldbühne resumed its classical music concerts, and playing movies. The theatre was also used as an improvised ring for boxing matches.

=== 1990–2004: Reunified Berlin ===
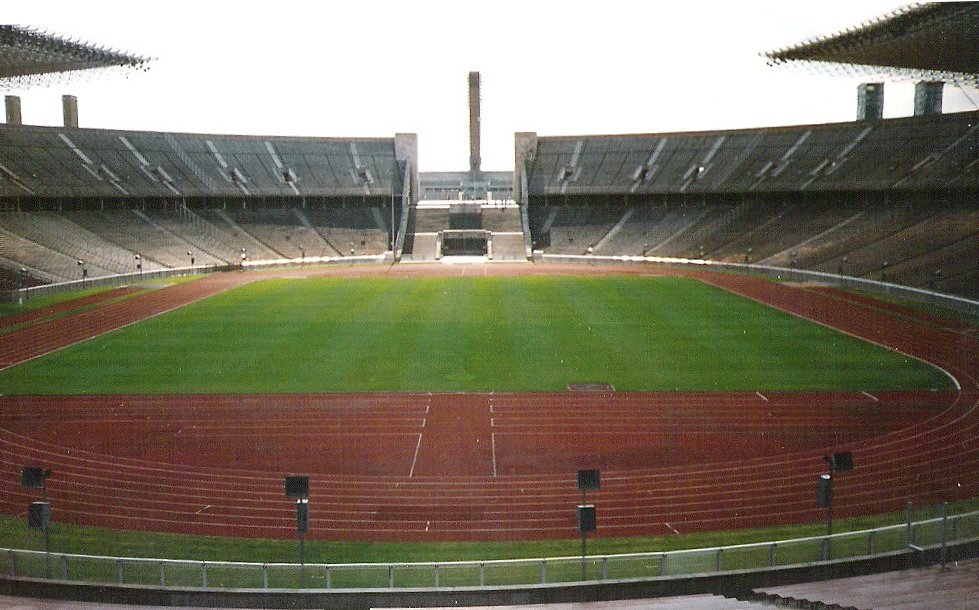
The stadium prior to renovation

In 1998, Berliners debated the destiny of the Olympiastadion in light of the legacy it represented for Germany. Some wanted to tear the stadium down and build a new one from scratch, while others favoured letting it slowly crumble "like the Colosseum in Rome". Finally, it was decided to renovate the Olympiastadion.

FIFA chose it as one of the venues of the 2006 FIFA World Cup. The State of Berlin hired a consortium composed of Walter Bau AG and DYWIDAG that won the €45 million franchise. The consortium took charge of the operation of the facilities together with Hertha BSC and the Government of Berlin after the remodelling. On 3 July 2000, the renovation began with a ceremony presided over by the Chancellor Gerhard Schröder, accompanied by Eberhard Diepgen (Mayor of Berlin), Franz Beckenbauer and Prof. Dr. Ignaz Walter.

=== 2004–present: Multi-purpose arena ===
The re-inauguration celebrations of the new Olympiastadion were carried out on 31 July 2004, and 1 August 2004. On that day, Saturday, the party began with performances from Pink, Nena and Daniel Barenboim. It culminated at night with the opening ceremony. On day two, friendly matches were played between different categories of the club Hertha BSC and visiting teams. On 8 September 2004, Brazil played Germany.

From 2003 to 2007, the stadium was home to the Berlin Thunder.

In 2011, the venue hosted the World Culture Festival organized by the Art of Living where 70,000 people meditated for peace.

In 2015, the venue hosted the 2015 UEFA Champions League final.

In 2018, the venue hosted the 2018 European Athletics Championships.

In 2024, the venue hosted the UEFA Euro 2024 final.

In 2025, the venue hosted the NFL International Series between the Indianapolis Colts and the Atlanta Falcons.

== Renovation ==
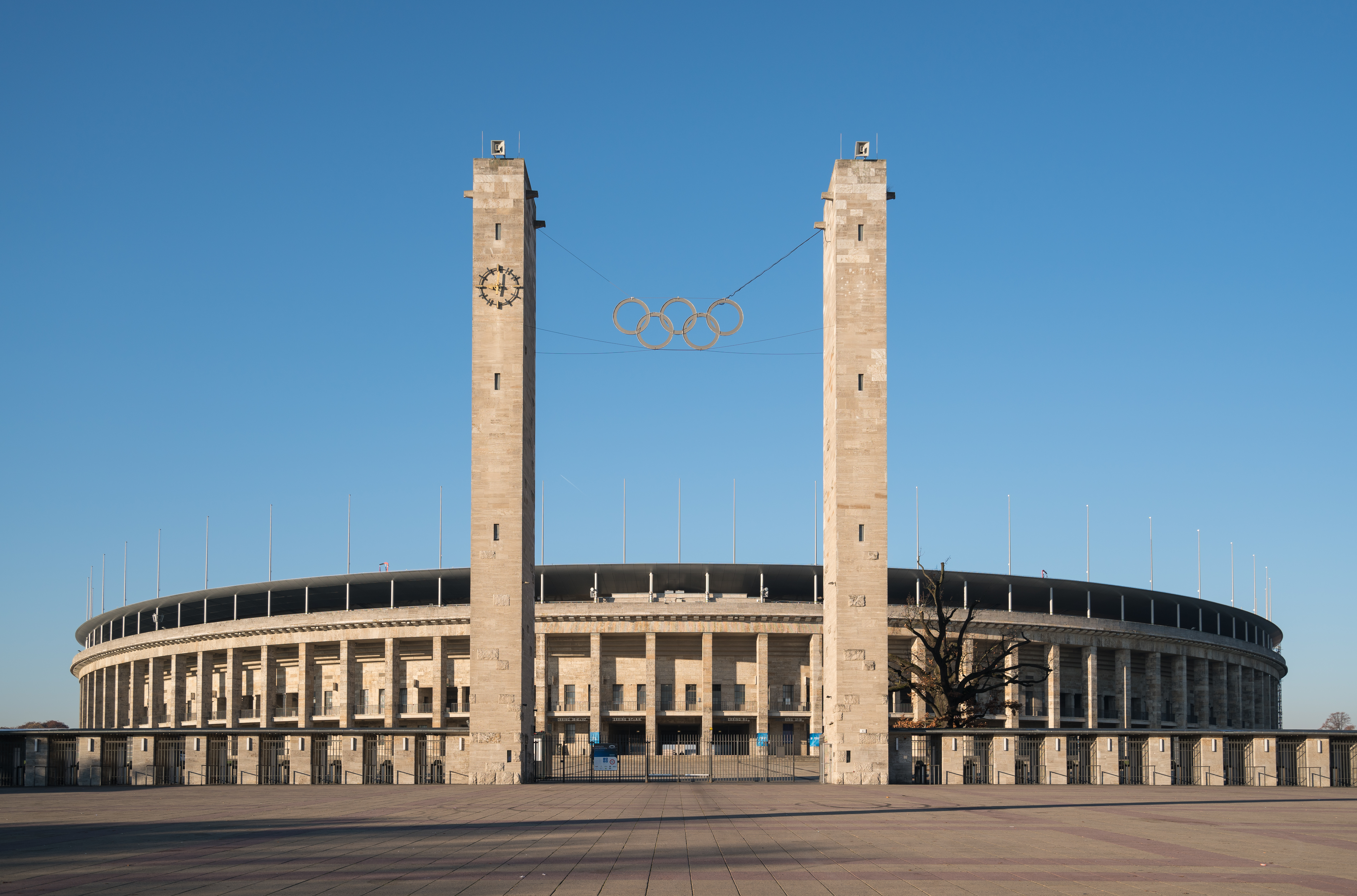
The Olympiastadion seen from the eastern side (2015)

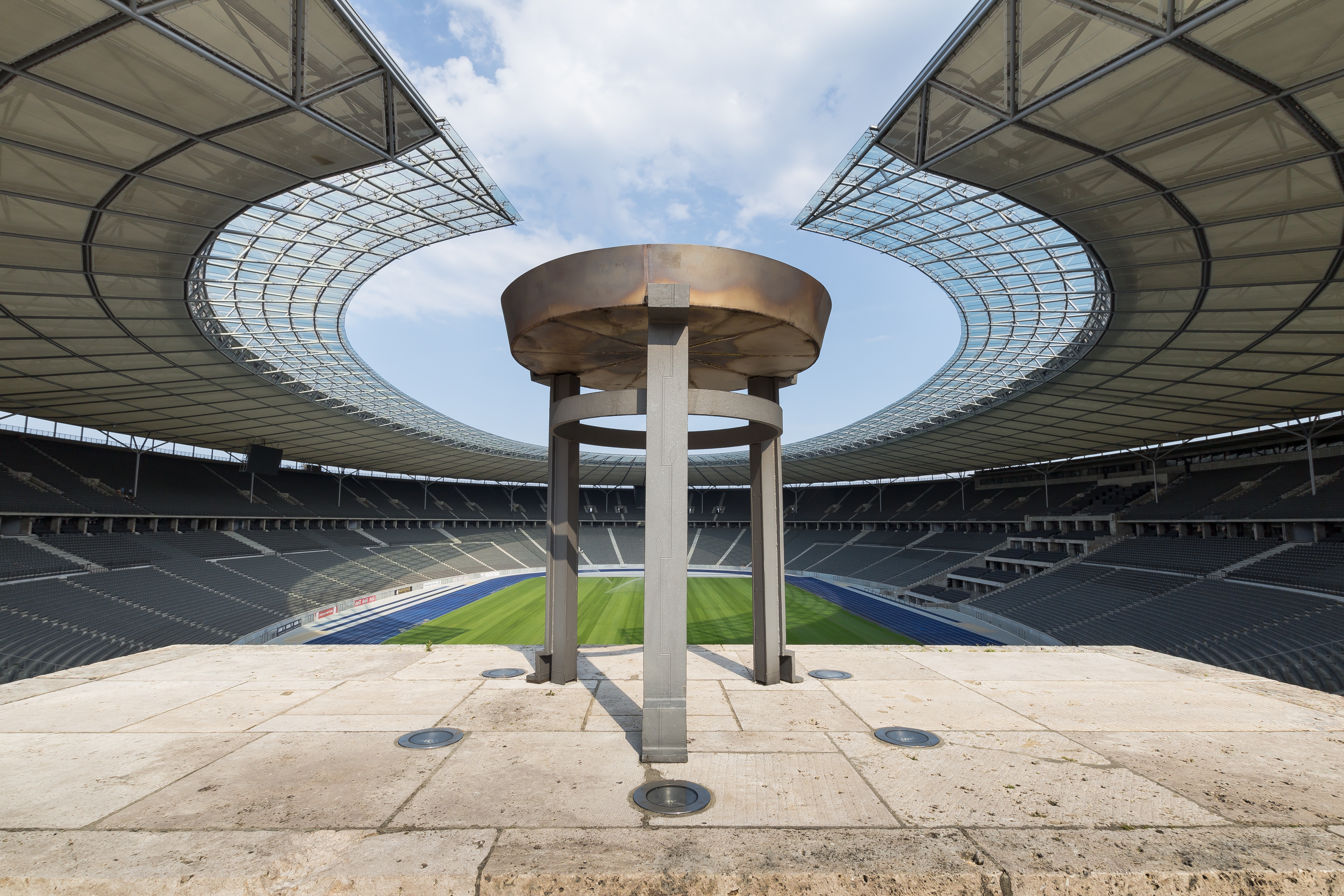
Interior view from the Marathon Gate, showing the Olympic cauldron

With the intention of creating a more intimate atmosphere for football games, the playing field was lowered by 2.65 metres (8.7 ft). Approximately 90,000 cubic metres (3,200,000 cu ft) of sand was excavated. The lower tier of seating in the stadium was demolished and rebuilt at a completely different angle of inclination.

The roof was extended to cover a total of 37,000 square metres (400,000 ft^{2}), with 20 roof-supporting columns carrying a weight of 3,500 tonnes (3,900 short tons) of steel. The roof rises 68 metres (223 ft) over the seats and is made up of transparent panels that allow sunlight to stream in during the day. The western portion (on the Marathon Arch) is open to reveal the Bell Tower to the spectators.

The conservation factor of the Olympiastadion as a historical monument was also considered, especially with respect to the preservation of the natural stone blocks. After criticisms, the colour of the athletics track around the game field was changed from red to blue, reflecting the colours of Hertha BSC.

The renovations used 70,000 cubic metres (2,500,000 cu ft) of concrete and 20,000 cubic metres (710,000 cu ft) of pre-cast reinforced concrete elements. Some 12,000 cubic metres (420,000 cu ft) of concrete was demolished and removed and 30,000 cubic metres (1,100,000 cu ft) of natural stone was refurbished.

The Olympiastadion was equipped with the latest technology in artificial illumination and sound equipment. It has 113 VIP stands, a set of restaurants, and two underground garages (for 630 cars). The total cost of the remodelling and amplification was €242 million.

== Capacity ==
The new Olympiastadion has the highest all-seated capacity in Germany. It has a permanent capacity of 74,475 seats. The upper tier has 31 seating rows at an average slope of 23° and houses 36,455 seats, of which 36,032 are regular seats, 290 are seats on the press stand and 133 are seats in skyboxes. The lower tier has 42 seating rows at an average angle of 25.4° and houses 38,020 seats, of which 32,310 are regular seats, 560 are box seats, 563 are lounge seats (expandable to 743), 4,413 are business seats, and 174 are wheelchair spaces.

For some football matches, such as those between Hertha BSC and FC Bayern Munich, the capacity can be temporarily expanded by the addition of a mobile grandstand over the Marathon Arch. The extended capacity reached 76,197 seats in 2014.

The only stadiums in Germany with higher total capacities are the Signal Iduna Park in Dortmund and the Allianz Arena in Munich. However, the Signal Iduna Park and the Allianz Arena have both seating and standing areas and their all-seated capacities are lower than that of the Olympiastadion. The total capacity of the Allianz Arena is also lower than the extended capacity of the Olympiastadion.

== Tenant ==
The stadium has been used as the home venue for the 2. Bundesliga club Hertha Berlin since 1963. In 1963, the Bundesliga was formed, and Hertha BSC participated by direct invitation, leaving its old stadium (the "Plumpe") to use the Olympiastadion. On 24 August, it played the first local match against 1. FC Nürnberg, with the final score 1–1. However, in 1965, the German Football Association found Hertha BSC guilty of bribery and relegated them to the Regionalliga Berlin.

In 1968, Hertha returned to the first division, and to the Olympiastadion, and in 1971 sold the "Plumpe". The second half of the 1970s was quite successful for Hertha BSC. In 1979, it reached the semi-finals of the UEFA Cup, but was defeated by Red Star Belgrade. Hertha reached the finals of the German Cup twice (1977 and 1979). In the 1980s, Hertha had a declining time in the Bundesliga, and fell into the Amateur-Oberliga Berlin in 1986. They moved to the smaller Poststadion. Hertha recovered, and joined the 2. Bundesliga for the 1988–89 season, and returned to the Olympiastadion. Other teams have also used the Olympiastadion, like Tasmania, Tennis Borussia and Blau-Weiß 90 when they played in the Bundesliga. 1. FC Union Berlin played four home matches during the 2021–22 UEFA Europa Conference League at the Olympiastadion and the home matches in the 2023–24 UEFA Champions League, both due to the Stadion An der Alten Försterei not being up to UEFA's Stadium Specifications.

When the Olympiastadion was not picked to host matches for the UEFA Euro 1988 because of West Berlin's controversial status, the stadium held a Four Nations Tournament instead, and the DFB-Pokal final was awarded to Berlin for five years. It has been held there permanently since 1985. The stadium also hosted the women's DFB-Pokal finals from 1985 to 2009.

With the demolition of the Berlin Wall in November 1989, a spontaneous feeling of sympathy between Hertha and 1. FC Union Berlin from East Berlin arose, which culminated in a friendly match at the Olympiastadion with 50,000 spectators (27 January 1990). In 1990, Hertha returned to the Bundesliga, although they fell again to the 2. Bundesliga from 1991 until 1997.

Since 1997, the club has improved, climbing up the Bundesliga table and qualifying for the UEFA Champions League, with matches against top European teams like Chelsea and AC Milan.

== Notable events ==
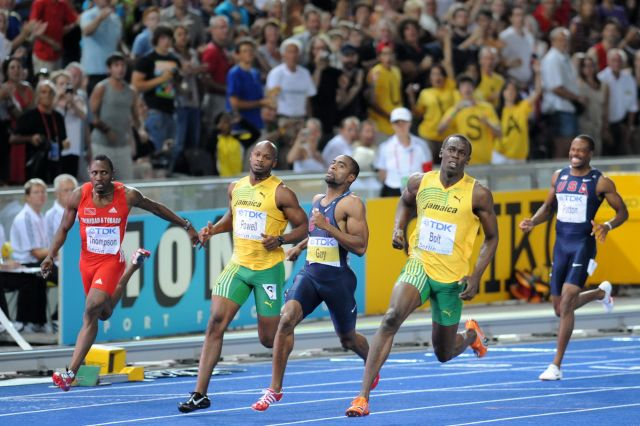
Ahead, left to right: Asafa Powell, Tyson Gay, and Usain Bolt, 2009 in Berlin

The Olympiastadion held the world record for the attendance of a baseball game during the 1936 Olympics thought to be over 100,000.

The stadium also hosted The World Culture Festival. 2011 was to celebrate 30 years of service to humanity by Art of Living Foundation.

The stadium also hosts the annual Internationales Stadionfest since 1937, which served as an IAAF Golden League event until 2010.

The stadium hosted the 2009 World Championships in Athletics where Usain Bolt broke the 100 metres and 200 metres world records.

=== 1936 Summer Olympics ===
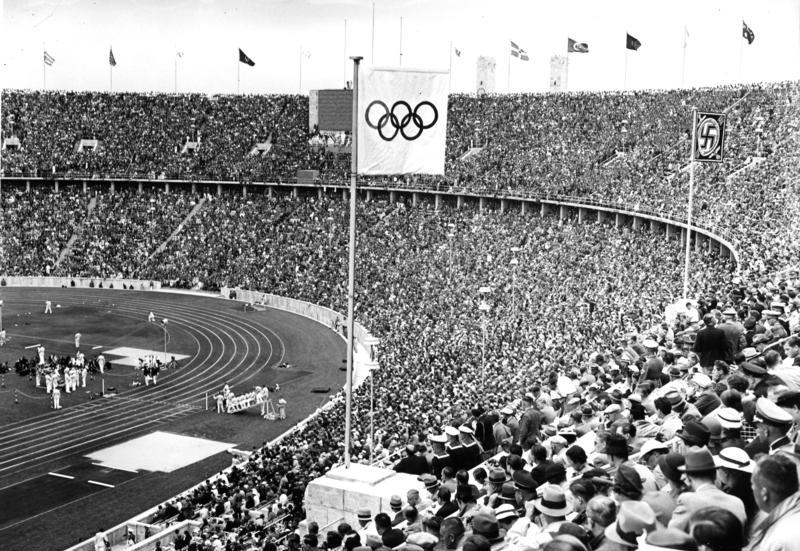
The Olympic flag flying over the Olympiastadion along with the personal standard of Adolf Hitler in 1936

On 1 August 1936, the Olympics were officially inaugurated by the head of state Adolf Hitler, and the Olympic cauldron was lit by athlete Fritz Schilgen. Four million tickets were sold for all the events of the 1936 Summer Olympics. This was also the first Olympics with television transmission (25 viewing spaces were scattered all over Berlin and Potsdam) and radio transmissions in 28 languages (with 20 radio vans and 300 microphones).

While the Olympic flame had been used for the first time in Amsterdam in 1928, in Berlin 1936 a marathon-like tour of the Olympic torch was introduced, from Olympia in Greece, crossing six frontiers with a journey of 3,000 kilometres (1,900 mi) to Berlin, through Greece, Bulgaria, Yugoslavia, Hungary, Czechoslovakia, Austria and Germany. The original idea of this Olympic torch relay was Carl Diem's, who was a political advisor to Propaganda Minister Joseph Goebbels, specialising in Olympic affairs. The Olympics were the subject of the propaganda film Olympia (1938) by Leni Riefenstahl.

Among the sport competitions, one of the most memorable events was the performance of the African-American track and field athlete Jesse Owens, representing the United States of America. Owens won the gold medal in the 100, 200, long jump and 4 × 100 relay. One of the main streets outside the stadium is named Jesse Owens Allee in recognition of his performance. The stadium also hosted the equestrian jumping, football, and handball events.

=== 1974 FIFA World Cup Group A ===
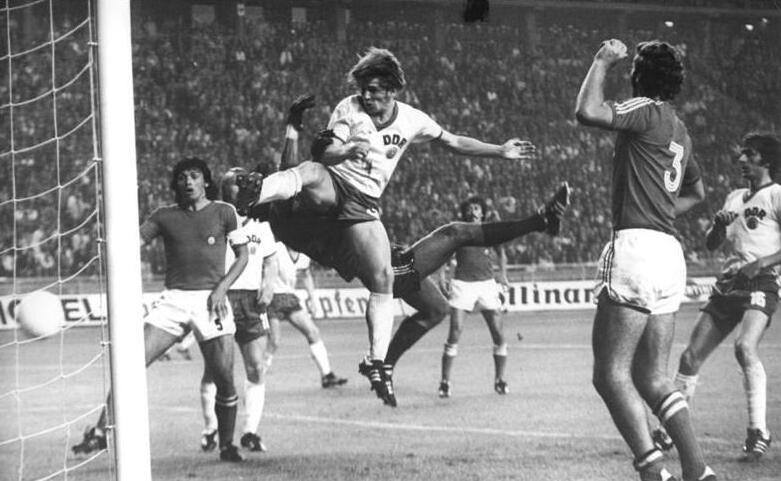
GDR vs Chile in 1974

The three matches from Group A involving Chile were played in the Olympiastadion. The third match, Australia vs Chile, was played in torrential rain. The historic match between the two German teams, however, was played in Hamburg. The hosts, West Germany, won the tournament.

Team	Pts	Pld	W	D	L	GF	GA	GD
East Germany	5	3	2	1	0	4	1	3
West Germany	4	3	2	0	1	4	1	3
Chile	2	3	0	2	1	1	2	−1
Australia	1	3	0	1	2	0	5	−5

Date	Team #1	Result	Team #2	Round	Attendance
14 June 1974	West Germany	1–0	Chile	First Round, Group A	81,100
18 June 1974	East Germany	1–1	Chile	First Round, Group A	28,300
22 June 1974	Australia	0–0	Chile	First Round, Group A	17,400

=== 2006 FIFA World Cup ===
The following matches were played in Berlin, for the 2006 FIFA World Cup:

Date	Time (CEST)	Team #1	Result	Team #2	Round	Spectators
13 June 2006	21:00	Brazil	1–0	Croatia	Group F	72,000
15 June 2006	21:00	Sweden	1–0	Paraguay	Group B	72,000
20 June 2006	16:00	Ecuador	0–3	Germany	Group A	72,000
23 June 2006	16:00	Ukraine	1–0	Tunisia	Group H	72,000
30 June 2006	17:00	Germany	1–1 (4–2 pen.)	Argentina	Quarter-finals	72,000
9 July 2006	20:00	Italy	1–1 (5–3 pen.)	France	Final	69,000

=== 2011 FIFA Women's World Cup ===
In 2011, the Olympiastadion hosted Germany's opening match in the 2011 FIFA Women's World Cup. It was the only match in the tournament to be contested at the stadium.

Date	Time (CEST)	Team #1	Result	Team #2	Round	Spectators
26 June 2011	18:00	Germany	2–1	Canada	Group A	73,680

=== 2015 UEFA Champions League Final ===
In May 2013, the Olympiastadion was chosen as the venue for the 2015 UEFA Champions League Final. FC Barcelona won their fifth title and completed a second treble.

6 June 2015
20:45 CEST

Juventus (Italy)	1–3	(Spain) Barcelona
Morata 55'	Report	Rakitić 4'; Suárez 68'; Neymar 90+7'

Olympiastadion, Berlin
Attendance: 70,442
Referee: Cüneyt Çakır (Turkey)

=== 2023 Special Olympics World Summer Games ===
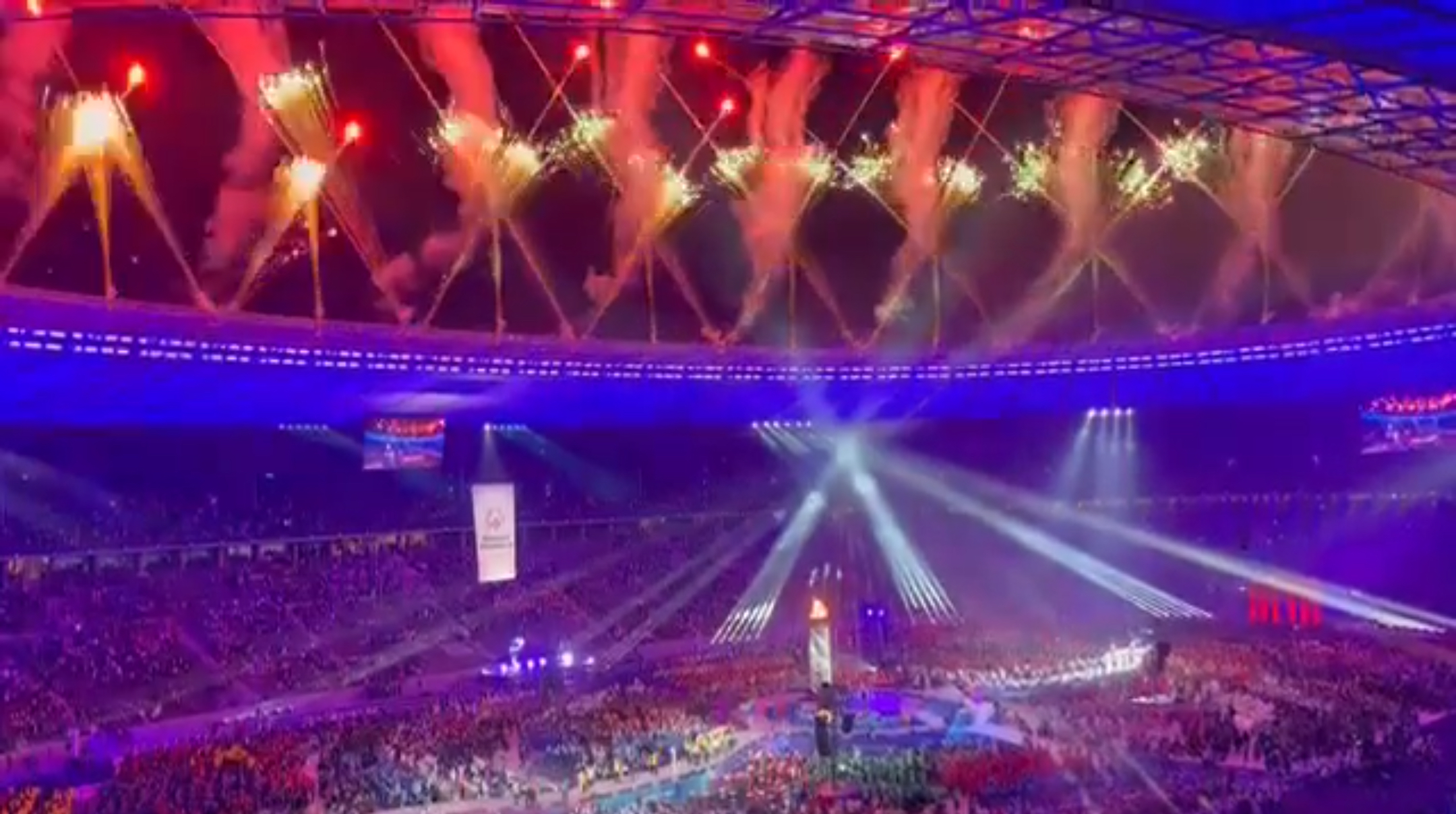
Opening Ceremony of the 2023 Special Olympics World Summer Games

On 17 June 2023, the opening ceremony of the 2023 Special Olympics World Summer Games was held at the Olympiastadion.

=== UEFA Euro 2024 ===
Olympiastadion hosted six UEFA Euro 2024 matches, including one round of 16 match, one quarter-final match, and the final on 14 July 2024.

Date	Time (CEST)	Team #1	Result	Team #2	Round	Spectators
15 June 2024	18:00	Spain	3–0	Croatia	Group B	68,844
21 June 2024	18:00	Poland	1–3	Austria	Group D	69,455
25 June 2024	18:00	Netherlands	2–3	Austria	Group D	68,363
29 June 2024	18:00	Switzerland	2–0	Italy	Round of 16	68,172
6 July 2024	21:00	Netherlands	2–1	Turkey	Quarter-finals	70,091
14 July 2024	21:00	Spain	2–1	England	Final	65,600

=== NFL International Germany Game ===
The stadium hosted five American Bowls between 1990 and 1994. The stadium was also home to Berlin Thunder, an American football team in NFL Europe, from 2003 until the league's operator, the U.S. National Football League, closed down the money-losing competition in 2007. The NFL would return to the stadium on 9 November 2025 for the NFL International Series, the first regular season game in Berlin between the Indianapolis Colts and the Atlanta Falcons with the Colts winning 31–25 in front of 72,203.

Year	Date	Designated visitor	Score	Designated home	Score	Attendance
2025	November 9	Atlanta Falcons	25	Indianapolis Colts	31^{OT}	72,203
2027						
2029						

== Cultural references ==
- The stadium was used as a location scene in the cinematic cold-war spy drama The Quiller Memorandum (1966).
- In 2016, the stadium fielded the finish line of the 27th season of MTV's reality-competition series The Challenge, titled The Challenge: Battle of the Bloodlines.

== Transport ==
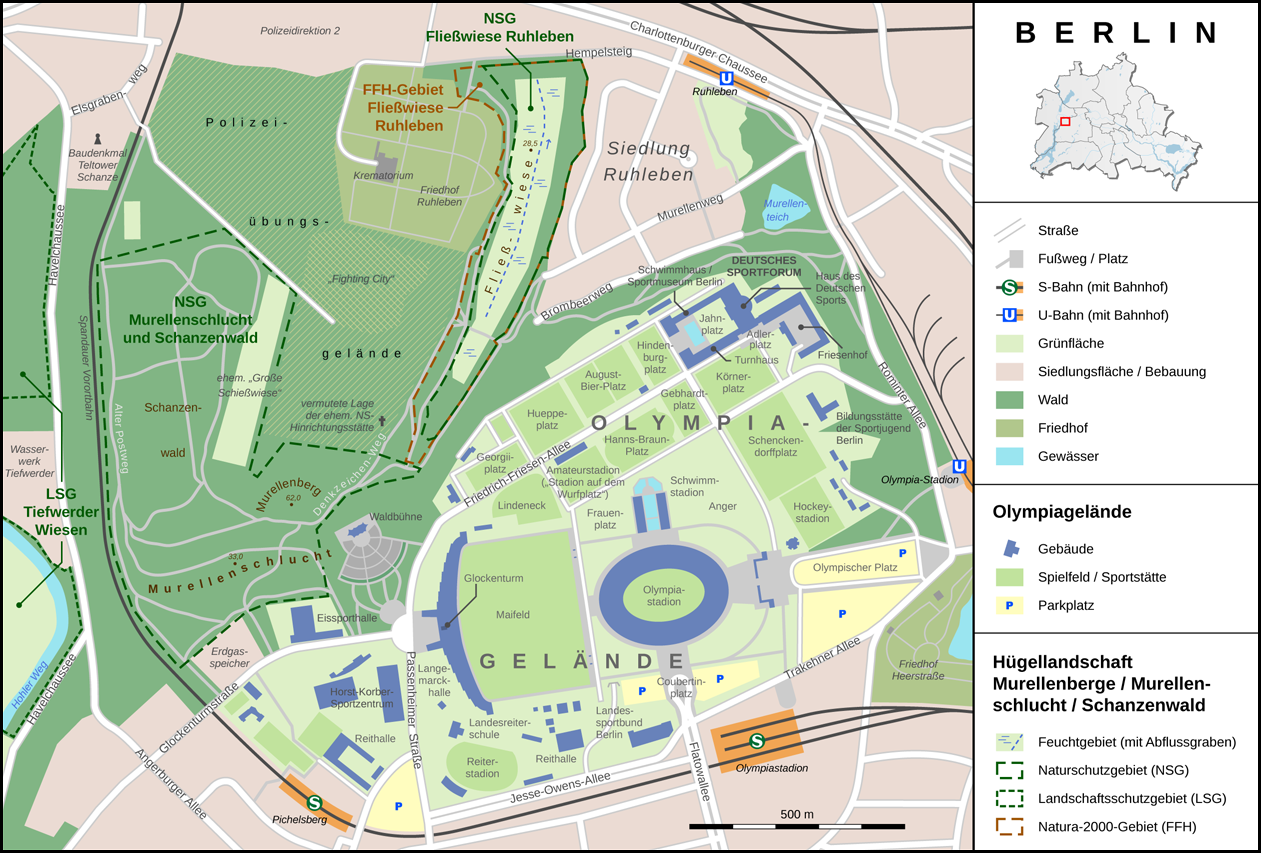
Map of the venue

=== U-Bahn ===
The underground train (U-Bahn) U2 takes visitors directly to the station Olympia-Stadion. It is a short walk from there to the stadium (East Gate entrance: 500 m, South Gate entrance: 870 m). Average travel time: 14 minutes from Zoologischer Garten, 24 minutes from Potsdamer Platz, 34 minutes from Alexanderplatz.

=== S-Bahn ===
The suburban rail (S-Bahn) S3 and S9 takes visitors directly to the station Olympiastadion. It's a short walk from there to the stadium (South Gate entrance via exit Flatowallee: 200 m, East Gate entrance via exit Trakehner Allee: 250 m). Average travel time: 7 minutes from Spandau station, 14 minutes from Zoologischer Garten, 22 minutes from Friedrichstrasse, 26 minutes from Alexanderplatz. For events in the Olympiastadion (for example, Hertha BSC games or international football matches) and in the Olympic Park (for example, Lollapalooza Berlin), special trains are used that stop at four terminal island platforms of the S-Bahn station.

=== Bus ===
With the bus lines M49 and 218 visitors can reach the stop Flatowallee. It is a short walk from there to the stadium. With the bus line 143 visitors can reach the underground station Neu-Westend. There is a path directly to the stadium.

== See also ==
- Berlin
- Football in Berlin
- Sport in Berlin
- Lists of stadiums

== Literature ==
- "Olympiastadion Berlin" by Andreas Janowski. Published by Andreas Janowski Verlag under the label "sights-on-audio"
- 1936 Summer Olympics official report. Volume 1. pp. 141–9, 154–62.
- Olympiastadion: The Unity Derby. In: Sites of Unity (Haus der Geschichte), 2023.
