= Jamie Rooney =

England international rugby league footballer

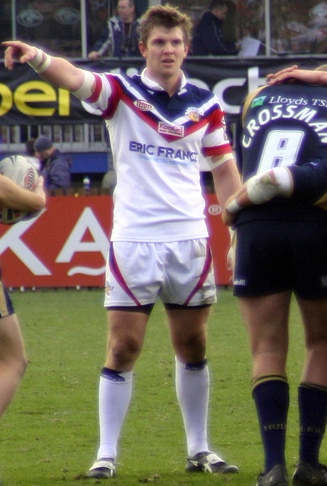

Personal information
- Born: 17 March 1980 (age 46) Featherstone, West Yorkshire, England

Playing information
- Height: 5 ft 10 in (1.78 m)
- Weight: 12 st 10 lb (81 kg)
- Position: Stand-off, Scrum-half
Club
Years	Team	Pld	T	G	FG	P
1998–02	Featherstone Rovers	118	66	473	37	1247
2001	Castleford Tigers	3	0	6	0	12
2003–09	Wakefield Trinity Wildcats	128	68	344	22	982
2009–11	Barrow Raiders	62	25	250	5	605
2011	Limoux Grizzlies
2012	South Wales Scorpions	7	2	23	0	54
2012–13	Whitehaven	41	15	78	4	220
2014	Gateshead Thunder	9	4	8	0	32
2014	Featherstone Rovers	3	0	6	1	13
	Total	371	180	1188	69	3165
Representative
Years	Team	Pld	T	G	FG	P
2006	England	4	4	18	0	52
- Relatives: Fletcher Rooney (son)

Jamie Rooney (born 17 March 1980) is an English former professional rugby league footballer who is currently the head coach of his hometown amateur club Featherstone Lions. He is also a former England international, being an integral part of the 2006 Federation Shield winning side.

He played for Featherstone Rovers in 1998 in the Treize Tournoi against Limoux. He made his league début in 1999 away at Whitehaven, coming off the substitutes bench and scoring one goal, and quickly became the first choice no. 7 at age 19. In two consecutive seasons he scored more than 100 points in the first 10 games, he is also in the Featherstone Rovers record books for most points in a season. He joined Castleford Tigers on trial in 2001, but was not offered a permanent contract. He joined Wakefield Trinity Wildcats in December 2002.

The England international had an excellent season with Trinity in 2006, amassing 197 points in 20 games after missing the early part of the season recovering from surgery on a troublesome knee. He shone for Wakefield Trinity again in 2007, playing 25 games and scoring 208 points during 25 appearances. This eventually led to his earning a place in the Great Britain initial train-on squad for the Gillette Fusion Test series against New Zealand.

Rooney's autobiography, High Ambitions, was released at the end of March 2009.

In July 2009, he was signed on loan to Co-operative Championship title hopefuls Barrow. After his contract expired at Wakefield, he rejected numerous offers from Super League clubs, instead deciding to stay at Barrow. He was made captain for the 2010 season. He left the club at the end of the 2011 season to join French side Limoux for the 2011-12 Elite One Championship season. He signed for South Wales Scorpions for the 2012 season. South Wales Scorpions released Rooney "by mutual consent" on 11 April 2012, according to the scorpions website. Rooney went on to play for Whitehaven and Gateshead until July 2014 when he re-signed for Featherstone Rovers.
