= Phil Jones (rugby) =

English rugby league and rugby union player

Personal information
- Full name: Philip David Jones
- Born: 30 September 1977 (age 48) Wigan, England

Playing information

Rugby league
- Position: Centre, Stand-off
Club
Years	Team	Pld	T	G	FG	P
1997–99	Lancashire Lynx	48	20	125	1	331
1999–01	Wigan Warriors	23	7	25	0	78
2004–05	Leigh Centurions	21	9	37	0	110
	Total	92	36	187	1	519

Rugby union
- Position: Centre, Fly-half
Club
Years	Team	Pld	T	G	FG	P
2001–03	Orrell
2003–04	Rotherham Titans
2005–11	Sedgley Park
	Total	0	0	0	0	0

Philip David Jones (born 30 September 1977) is an English former rugby league and rugby union footballer who played as a goal-kicking centre or stand-off/fly-half. He played for Lancashire Lynx, Wigan Warriors and Leigh Centurions in rugby league, and Orrell, Rotherham Titans and Sedgley Park in rugby union.

== Career ==
Jones started his senior career at Lancashire Lynx after being signed from amateur club Hindley. He moved to Super League side Wigan Warriors in 1999 for a transfer fee believed to be around £35,000. He spent three seasons at the club before switching to rugby union in 2001. In May 2002 Clive Woodward called up Jones to the England squad for the non-cap test against the Barbarians.

He returned to rugby league for one season to play for Leigh Centurions in 2005.
