= Medically Aware and Responsible Citizens of Hyderabad =

Social Organisation of Medical Professionals

Medically Aware and Responsible Citizens of Hyderabad abbreviated as MARCH is a social organization of Medical professionals working for the improvement of Hyderabad. The MARCH organizes seminars and lectures of public interest regularly.

It was established by Dr. Pushpa Mittra Bhargava in 1995 and he is the present chairperson. He brought together doctors, hospital administrators, scientists, pharmaceutical industry personnel, and social workers to take up medical and health issues in Hyderabad.

The issues taken up was pressing the central government to have an accreditation system for diagnostic centres and fertility clinics that practice assisted reproductive technologies and prepared the regulatory guidelines. Another project emphasises on the need for India to have its own clinical parameters for diagnosis. It helped the Hyderabad in having a proper biomedical waste system.
