= Josh Bostock =

Australian rugby league footballer (born 1974)

Personal information
- Full name: Joshua Bostock
- Born: 24 January 1974 (age 52) Australia

Playing information
- Position: Wing, Centre
Club
Years	Team	Pld	T	G	FG	P
1997	Balmain Tigers	2	1	0	0	4
1998	Wakefield Trinity	15	16	0	0	64
1999	Oldham	7	3	0	0	12
	Total	24	20	0	0	80
- Relatives: Jack Bostock (son); Indie Bostock (daughter)

Joshua "Josh" Bostock (born 24 January 1974) is an Australian former professional rugby league footballer who played in the 1990s. He played at club level for the Western Suburbs Red Devils (c. 1995), the Balmain Tigers, the Adelong Batlow Bears (in Batlow, New South Wales, 17-miles south of Adelong, New South Wales, previously of Group 9 Rugby League), Wakefield Trinity, and Oldham, as a wing or centre.

== Playing career ==
=== First Division Grand Final appearances ===
Josh Bostock played on the wing, and scored two tries in Wakefield Trinity's 24-22 victory over Featherstone Rovers in the 1998 First Division Grand Final at McAlpine Stadium, Huddersfield on 26 September 1998.

=== Club career ===
Josh Bostock made his début for Wakefield Trinity, played at centre, and scored three tries (a hat-trick) in the 46-28 victory over Rochdale Hornets at Spotland Stadium, Rochdale on Sunday 7 June 1998.
