= Marche (disambiguation) =

Marche or the Marches is one of the 20 regions of Italy.

Marche may also refer to:

== Places ==
=== Belgium ===
- Marche (Chamber of Representatives constituency) 1831–1900
- Marche-en-Famenne, Wallonia
- Marche-les-Dames, Wallonia

=== France ===
- County of La Marche, the later province Marche

=== Italy ===
- Marche (Chamber of Deputies constituency)
- Marche (Milan Metro), a railway station
- Marche (Turin Metro), a railway station
- Ancona Airport, Ancona
- Marche Polytechnic University, Ancona

=== United States ===
- Marche, Arkansas

== People with the surname ==
- Antoine-Alfred Marche (1844–1898), French naturalist and explorer
- Robert Marche, English MP
- Roger Marche (1924–1997), French footballer
- Stephen Marche (born 1976), Canadian writer

== Other uses ==
- 32 Infantry Division Marche, a unit of the Italian Army during World War II
- Marche Radiuju, a character in the tactical role-playing game Final Fantasy Tactics Advance

== See also ==
- Marches, Drôme, a commune in France
- En Marche!, a political party of France
- La Marche (disambiguation)
- March (disambiguation)
- Marcha (disambiguation)
