= George Tandy Jr. =

American R&B-soul singer-songwriter

- Born: Norfolk, Virginia, U.S.
- Genres: R&B; soul; jazz
- Occupations: Musician, singer-songwriter, composer
- Instruments: Vocals, piano
- Years active: 2013–present
- Label: RedStar
- Website: www.georgetandyjr.com

George Tandy Jr. is an American R&B-soul singer-songwriter. His debut single, "March", was released in 2013 and peaked on the Billboard R&B charts the following year.

== Biography ==
Tandy was born and raised in Virginia, where he learned to play several instruments. His stepmother, Candi, a vocal coach and artist developer, encouraged him to move to Florida to pursue singing, songwriting, and playing keyboards while working as a hip-hop dancer. Tandy later found work as a barista at Starbucks, where he gave a copy of his demo to Cima Georgevich, a frequent customer who was also the CEO of RedStar Entertainment. The label signed Tandy and released his debut single, "March", in September 2013. The song, produced with the help of Tandy's jazz musician father, George Sr., entered the Billboard US Adult R&B chart later that month and peaked at number three in March 2014.

== Discography ==
- The Foundation EP (2014)

=== Singles ===
List of singles as lead artist, with selected chart positions and certifications, showing year released and album name
Title	Year	Peak chart positions			Album
Title	Year	US	US Adult R&B	US R&B/Hip-Hop Airplay	Album
"March"	2013	112	3	20	The Foundation
"Jaded"	2014	—	11	—	The Foundation
"Already Love"	2017	—	20	—	
