= John March (barrister) =

English barrister and legal writer

John March (c.1611–1657) was an English barrister and legal writer.

== Early life ==
There remains doubt over John March's background. D. A. Orr in the Oxford Dictionary of National Biography tentatively identifies him with the John March admitted to the degree of B.C.L. 27 November 1632, as a member of St. Edmund Hall, Oxford; and more confidently with the John March of Barnard's Inn in 1635, of Gray's Inn in 1636, and called to the bar in June 1641.

== Long Parliament employee ==
An Argument or Debate in Law of the great question concerning the Militia (1642) by March argued the legality of Parliament's moves to raise troops. By early 1644, March was working for the Committee of Both Kingdoms. On 20 August 1649 the Council of State nominated him as one of four commissioners to go to Guernsey; three years later (6 April 1652) he was chosen by the Council of State to Scotland, with three others to administer justice in the courts.

In 1656 March seems to have been acting as secretary or treasurer to the trustees for the sale of crown lands at Worcester House. He died early in 1657.

== Works ==
March's legal works were:

- An Argument or Debate in Law of the great question concerning the Militia as it is now settled by Ordinance of Parliament, by which it is endeavoured to prove the Legality of it and to make it warrantable by the Fundamental Laws of the Land, London, 1642. The title-page bears only the initials J. M., and it has in the past been attributed to John Milton.
- Actions for Slander, or a Methodical Collect ion under certain Grounds and Heads of what Words are Actionable in the Law and what not, &c. ... to which is added Awards or Arbitrements Methodised under several Grounds and Heads collected out of our Year-Books and other Private Authentic Authorities, wherein is principally showed what Arbitrements are good in Law and what not, London, 1648. A second edition, also of 1648, added The Second Part of Actions for Slanders, with a Second Part of Arbitrements, together with Directions and Presidents to them very useful to all Men. To which is added Libels or a Caveat to all Infamous Libellers whom these distracted times have generated and multiplied to a common pest. A third enlarged edition by W. B. was published in 1674.
- Reports, or New Cases with divers Resolutions and Judgments given upon solemn arguments and with great deliberation, and the Reasons and Causes of the said Resolutions and Judgments, London, 1648; contains the reports from Easter term 15 Caroli I to Trinity term 18 Caroli I).
- Amicus Reipublicae, the Commonwealth's Friend, or an Exact and Speedie Course to Justice and Right, and for Preventing and Determining of tedious Law Suits, and many other things very considerable for the good of the Public, all which are fully Controverted and Debated in Law, London, 1651. This work was dedicated to John Bradshaw, and discussed 18 questions (such as common recovery, arrest for debt, the burden of the high court of chancery, bastardy, and privilege of clergy.)
- Some New Cases of the Years and Time of Hy. VIII, Ed. VI, and Queen Mary, written out of the "Great Abridgement," composed by Sir Robert Brook, Knight there dispersed in the Titles, but here collected under Years, and now translated into English by John March of Gray's Inn, Barrister, London, 1651; an English version of Brook's New Cases. In 1878 the Chiswick Press reprinted it with Sir Robert Broke's New Cases.

== Family ==
By license dated 23 March 1638, March, of St. Stephen's, Walbrook, scrivener and bachelor aged 26, married Alice Matthews of St. Nicholas Olave. On his death in 1657, his widow received support from the Council of State.

== Notes ==
Attribution

This article incorporates text from a publication now in the public domain: Lee, Sidney, ed. (1893). "March, John (1612-1657)". Dictionary of National Biography. Vol. 36. London: Smith, Elder & Co.
