= Werner March =

German architect (1894–1976)

Olympic medal record

Art competitions
Gold medal – first place	1936 Berlin	Town planning
Silver medal – second place	1936 Berlin	Architecture

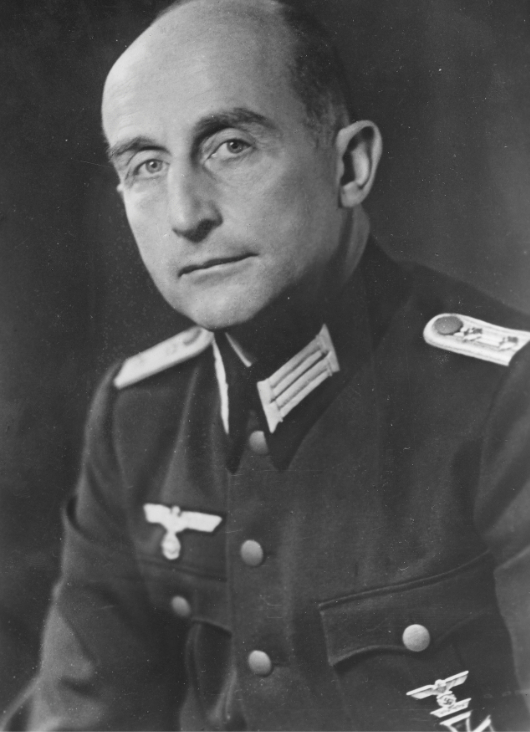
March in January 1944 as a captain in the Wehrmacht

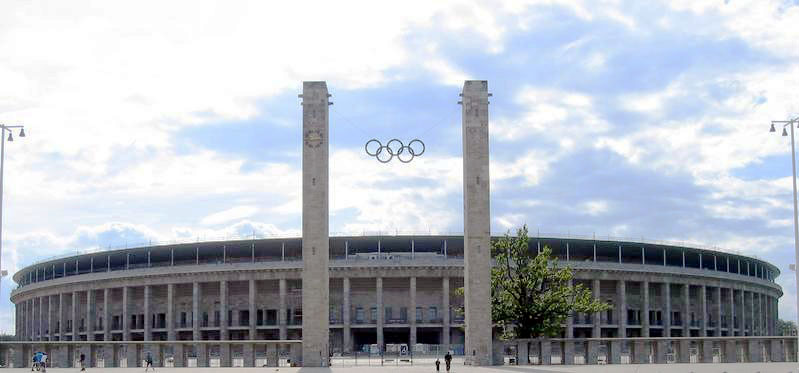
Berlin Olympic Stadium

Werner Julius March (17 January 1894 – 11 January 1976) was a German architect, son of Otto March (1845–1913), and brother of Walter March, both also well-known German architects. Werner March designed Germany's 1936 Olympic stadium. Werner March was born in Charlottenburg and died in Berlin.

== Life and work ==
For the 1936 Summer Olympics in Germany, March created his most famous work, Berlin Olympic Stadium, which was on the site of the Deutsches Stadion, a stadium designed by his father, Otto March, for use in the 1916 Summer Olympics (which were later cancelled after the outbreak of World War I). It is unclear whether March was influenced to use a more conservative design to suit Nazi tastes (claimed by Albert Speer), or whether March devised a grand, sweeping architecture that anticipated the spirit of the Third Reich.

The stadium, which has a capacity of 74,228, is one of the Germany's major sports venues and was used both for the 1974 and 2006 FIFA World Cup. He also created plans for the Zentralstadion. He designed Carinhall, Hermann Göring's hunting lodge-style country residence near Berlin. During 1956 to 1960 he designed the Cairo International Stadium in Egypt. Designed as a multi-purpose stadium for the Olympic sports, it is primarily used as a venue for football games.

Additionally, March designed the National Museum of Iraq.

Together with his brother Walter, Werner March won a gold medal in the art competitions at the 1936 Summer Olympics.

== See also ==
- Nazi architecture
