= Paul March =

English RL coach and former rugby league footballer

Personal information
- Full name: Paul March
- Born: 25 July 1979 (age 47) Thornhill, West Yorkshire, England
- Height: 5 ft 9 in (1.75 m)
- Weight: 16 st 7 lb (105 kg)

Playing information
- Position: Stand-off, Scrum-half, Hooker, Loose forward
Club
Years	Team	Pld	T	G	FG	P
1998–01	Wakefield Trinity Wildcats	53	13	15	0	82
2002–06	Huddersfield Giants	90	17	36	1	141
2007	Wakefield Trinity Wildcats	20	4	8	0	32
2008–09	York City Knights	37	25	0	0	100
2010–11	Hunslet Hawks	50	25	0	0	100
2012–15	Keighley Cougars	78	18	0	0	72
	Total	328	102	59	1	527

Coaching information
Club
Years	Team	Gms	W	D	L	W%
2008–09	York City Knights
2009–11	Hunslet Hawks
2013–16	Keighley Cougars
2024–	Dewsbury Rams	68	22	1	45	32
	Total	68	22	1	45	32
- Source: As of 3 November 2026
- Relatives: David March (brother)

Paul March (born 25 July 1979) is an English professional rugby league coach who is the head coach of the Dewsbury Rams in the RFL Championship and a former professional rugby league footballer.

He played at club level for Wakefield Trinity (two spells), Huddersfield Giants, York City Knights, Hunslet hawks and Keighley Cougars as a stand-off, scrum-half, hooker or loose forward, and coached at club level for York City Knights, Hunslet, Keighley Cougars and the Thornhill Trojans ARLFC. in 2021 March became head coach of Shaw Cross Sharks achieving back to back promotions into the National Conference League division 1. In March 2024 he became assistant coach of Dewsbury Rams under then head coach Dale Ferguson. After Ferguson stepped down, after a poor start to the 2024 Championship season, March then became head coach. Winning only two games all season, Dewsbury were relegated to League One.

== Background ==
March was born in Thornhill, West Yorkshire, England.

== Career ==
March played much of the 2006's Super League XI at stand-off for the Huddersfield Giants, as the captain Chris Thorman was out injured with an arm injury.

In 2006's Super League XI during the Huddersfield Giants versus the Catalans Dragons match, Paul sustained a cruciate ligament knee injuryand was ruled out for the rest of the season. He was released from his contract at Huddersfield without playing another game, and later signed for Wakefield Trinity for the 2007 season.

== Coaching ==
Paul became player-coach for York in 2008, leaving Wakefield Trinity after just one season, and in July 2009 he joined Championship 1 club Hunslet as player-coach. He later moved to Keighley, again as player-coach, leaving the club at the end of the 2016 season.

=== Featherstone Rovers ===
Paul became Featherstone Rovers Reserves Head Coach and Assistant First Coach working under new Rovers Boss Ryan Carr in 2019.

=== Dewsbury Rams ===
On 1 May 2024 it was reported that he would step up from assistant at Dewsbury Rams to take over as interim head-coach following Dale Ferguson stepping down from that role after a disappointing start to the 2024 season

== Genealogical information ==
Paul March is the twin brother of the rugby league footballer; David March.
