= David March (rugby league) =

English former professional rugby league footballer

Personal information
- Born: 25 July 1979 (age 47) Thornhill, West Yorkshire, England

Playing information
- Height: 5 ft 10 in (1.78 m)
- Weight: 13 st 8 lb (86 kg)
- Position: Hooker
Club
| Years | Team | Pld | T | G | FG | P |
|---|---|---|---|---|---|---|
| 1997–07 | Wakefield Trinity | 204 | 35 | 126 | 0 | 392 |
| 2008–09 | York City Knights | 43 | 8 | 0 | 0 | 32 |
| 2010–14 | Hunslet Hawks | 122 | 36 | 139 | 0 | 422 |
| 2015 | Keighley Cougars | 17 | 2 | 0 | 0 | 8 |
| | Total | 386 | 81 | 265 | 0 | 854 |
- Relatives: Paul March (brother)

David March (born 25 July 1979) is an English former professional rugby league footballer who played as a hooker in the 1990s, 2000s and 2010s. He played for the Thornhill Trojans, Wakefield Trinity, York City Knights, Hunslet and the Keighley Cougars, occasionally featuring as a stand-off, scrum-half and loose forward.

== Background ==
David March was born in Thornhill, West Yorkshire, and he is the twin brother of the rugby league footballer and coach; Paul March.

=== Career records ===
David March is second in Wakefield Trinity's "Most Consecutive Appearances" record list with 95 consecutive appearances between 2003 and 2006, this is the highest in the Super League era, he his behind Harry Wilkinson who had 96 consecutive appearances.
