= Walter March =

German architect

Walter F. March
- Born: 26 August 1898; Germany
- Died: 23 August 1969
- Citizenship: United States (from 1937)
- Occupations: Architect, artist
- Known for: Co-designer of the Reichssportfeld
- Spouse: Louise Goepfert (m. 1933)
- Parent: Otto March (father)
- Relatives: Werner March (brother)
- Awards: Olympic gold medal in art competitions (1936)

Olympic medal record

Art competitions
Gold medal – first place	1936 Berlin	Town planning

Walter F. March (26 August 1898 – 23 August 1969) was a German architect. Son of German architect Otto March and brother of architect Werner March.

In 1936 he won a gold medal together with his brother Werner in the art competitions of the Olympic Games for their "Reichssportfeld" ("Reich Sport Field"). Father Otto March designed Germany's 1916 Olympic stadium.

Studied with Frank Lloyd Wright in 1925. Became an American citizen. He married Louise Goepfert(1900 — 1987) in 1933. Designed Olympic Village in 1936. Came to America in 1937. He worked on numerous buildings in the greater New York area, including the Chrysler Building in New York City.

He was also active as an architect and multidisciplinary artist, producing works in a range of media. These included hand-built ceramics, carved wooden sculptures, crosses and mosaic works, as well as commissioned pieces for churches. He further incorporated metalwork combined with mosaics, among other forms, and was characterized by whimsical, distinctive and finely executed designs.
