= 2017 League 1 results =

Rugby league competition results

All times are UK local time (UTC or UTC+1) on the relevant dates.

== Regular season ==
All times are UK local time (UTC or UTC+1) on the relevant dates.

=== Round 1 ===
Home	Score	Away	Match Information
Home	Score	Away	Date and Time	Venue	Referee	Attendance
London Skolars	0–76	Toronto Wolfpack	4 March 2017: 1500	New River Stadium	J McMullen	1,542
Barrow Raiders	28–0	York City Knights	4 March 2017: 1830	Craven Park	A Sweet	799
Oxford	40–12	Hemel Stags	5 March 2017: 1400	Tilsley Park	S Race	161
Keighley Cougars	50–8	North Wales Crusaders	5 March 2017: 1500	Cougar Park	N Bennett	752
Hunslet	10–6	Gloucestershire All Golds	5 March 2017: 1500	South Leeds Stadium	T Crashley	407
Doncaster	26–4	Coventry Bears	5 March 2017: 1500	Keepmoat Stadium	B Robinson	545
South Wales Ironmen	10–27	Whitehaven	5 March 2017: 1500	The Wern	G Dolan	223
Workington Town	20–24	Newcastle Thunder	5 March 2017: 1500	Derwent Park	L Moore	660

=== Round 2 ===
Home	Score	Away	Match Information
Home	Score	Away	Date and Time	Venue	Referee	Attendance
Oxford	6–20	Workington Town	12 March, 14:00	Tilsley Park	B Robinson	120
Whitehaven	10–24	Toronto Wolfpack	12 March, 14:00	Recreation Ground	L Moore	643
Hemel Stags	10–58	Hunslet	12 March, 14:00	Pennine Way	M Mannifield	155
North Wales Crusaders	8–44	Doncaster	12 March, 15:00	Queensway Stadium	J McMullen	305
Newcastle Thunder	24–22	London Skolars	12 March, 15:00	Kingston Park	N Bennett	607
York City Knights	26–24	South Wales Ironmen	12 March, 15:00	Bootham Crescent	L Staveley	752
Gloucestershire All Golds	46–22	Keighley Cougars	12 March, 15:00	Prince of Wales Stadium	M Griffiths	176
Coventry Bears	14–50	Barrow Raiders	12 March, 15:00	Butts Park Arena	M Rossleigh	447

=== Round 3 ===
Home	Score	Away	Match Information
Home	Score	Away	Date and Time	Venue	Referee	Attendance
London Skolars	42–16	Coventry Bears	25 March, 15:00	New River Stadium	M Rossleigh	287
Barrow Raiders	82–0	Hemel Stags	25 March, 18:30	Craven Park	G Dolan	739
South Wales Ironmen	20–26	Newcastle Thunder	26 March, 15:00	The Wern	S Race	150
Doncaster	34-16	Oxford	05 July, 19:00 (Note: Match previously postponed due to Oxford's involvement in a re-arranged Challenge Cup tie)	LD Nutrition Stadium	B Pearson	334
Keighley Cougars	21–48	Toronto Wolfpack	26 March, 15:00	Cougar Park	A Sweet	1,128
York City Knights	22–26	North Wales Crusaders	26 March, 15:00	Bootham Crescent	J Roberts	702
Workington Town	54–22	Gloucestershire All Golds	26 March, 15:00	Derwent Park	L Moore	509
Hunslet	18–19	Whitehaven	30 April, 14:00 (Note: Match previously postponed due to Whitehaven's involvement in a re-arranged Challenge Cup tie)	South Leeds Stadium	T Grant	382

=== Round 4 ===
Home	Score	Away	Match Information
Home	Score	Away	Date and Time	Venue	Referee	Attendance
Barrow Raiders	26–10	Workington Town	8 April, 18:30	Craven Park	B Robinson	1,284
Hemel Stags	6–84	Keighley Cougars	9 April, 14:00	Pennine Way	M Rossleigh	118
Whitehaven	44–12	Coventry Bears	9 April, 14:00	Recreation Ground	S Race	413
Oxford	35–28	York City Knights	9 April, 14:00	Tilsley Park	T Crashley	180
Doncaster	6–82	Toronto Wolfpack	9 April, 15:00	Keepmoat Stadium	J Roberts	943
Hunslet	58–6	South Wales Ironmen	9 April, 15:00	South Leeds Stadium	J McMullen	350
North Wales Crusaders	30–14	Newcastle Thunder	9 April, 15:00	Queensway Stadium	G Dolan	323
Gloucestershire All Golds	22–24	London Skolars	9 April, 15:00	Prince of Wales Stadium	N Bennett	179

=== Round 5 ===
Home	Score	Away	Match Information
Home	Score	Away	Date and Time	Venue	Referee	Attendance
Workington Town	20–24	Whitehaven	14 April, 15:00	Derwent Park	J Roberts	1,103
North Wales Crusaders	0–80	Toronto Wolfpack	14 April, 17:00	Queensway Stadium	B Robinson	590
Keighley Cougars	20–12	Hunslet	14 April, 15:00	Cougar Park	M Rossleigh	744
Coventry Bears	40–28	Oxford	14 April, 15:00	Butts Park Arena	M Mannifield	303
London Skolars	60–12	Hemel Stags	14 April, 15:00	New River Stadium	B Pearson	362
South Wales Ironmen	30–36	Gloucestershire All Golds	14 April, 15:00	The Wern	N Bennett	351
Newcastle Thunder	6–50	Barrow Raiders	14 April, 15:00	Kingston Park	S Race	1,073
York City Knights	16–8	Doncaster	14 April, 15:00	Bootham Crescent	G Dolan	1,012

=== Round 6 ===
Home	Score	Away	Match Information
Home	Score	Away	Date and Time	Venue	Referee	Attendance
Barrow Raiders	58–16	South Wales Ironmen	6 May, 18:30	Craven Park	L Staveley	805
Toronto Wolfpack	62–12	Oxford	6 May, 21:30	Lamport Stadium	B Robinson	6,281
Hemel Stags	18–66	Workington Town	7 May, 14:00	Pennine Way	M Rossleigh	105
Whitehaven	34–20	Newcastle Thunder	7 May, 14:00	Recreation Ground	S Race	425
Coventry Bears	24–44	Keighley Cougars	7 May, 15:00	Butts Park Arena	B Pearson	383
Gloucestershire All Golds	10–56	York City Knights	7 May, 15:00	Prince of Wales Stadium	G Dolan	180
Hunslet	36–26	North Wales Crusaders	7 May, 15:00	South Leeds Stadium	M Mannifield	420
Doncaster	28–28	London Skolars	7 May, 15:00	Keepmoat Stadium	N Bennett	564

=== Round 7 ===
Home	Score	Away	Match Information
Home	Score	Away	Date and Time	Venue	Referee	Attendance
Newcastle Thunder	22–40	Toronto Wolfpack	12 May, 19:30	Kingston Park	S Race	1,087
London Skolars	14–28	Whitehaven	13 May, 15:00	New River Stadium	M Rossleigh	335
Hemel Stags	24–50	Doncaster	14 May, 14:00	Pennine Way	B Robinson	102
Oxford	24–22	Hunslet	14 May, 14:00	Tilsley Park	G Dolan	203
York City Knights	64–12	Coventry Bears	14 May, 15:00	Bootham Crescent	C Straw	902
Gloucestershire All Golds	36–28	North Wales Crusaders	14 May, 15:00	Prince of Wales Stadium	T Grant	201
Keighley Cougars	42–58	Barrow Raiders	10 May, 19:30 (Note: fixture re-arranged due to Barrow's involvement in the Challenge Cup on the weekend of 13/14 May)	Cougar Park	A Sweet	728
Workington Town	56–0	South Wales Ironmen	14 May, 15:00	Derwent Park	J McMullen	546

=== Round 8 ===
Home	Score	Away	Match Information
Home	Score	Away	Date and Time	Venue	Referee	Attendance
Newcastle Thunder	18–22	York City Knights	19 May, 20:00	Kingston Park	S Mikalauskas	2,111
South Wales Ironmen	18–38	Oxford	20 May, 15:00	The Wern	B Pearson	128
Toronto Wolfpack	70–2	Barrow Raiders	20 May, 21:30	Lamport Stadium	J McMullen	7,144
Whitehaven	58–24	Hemel Stags	21 May, 14:00	Recreation Ground	N Bennett	487
Hunslet	30–22	Workington Town	21 May, 15:00	South Leeds Stadium	T Owen	388
Doncaster	28–14	Keighley Cougars	21 May, 15:00	Keepmoat Stadium	G Dolan	516
North Wales Crusaders	50–10	London Skolars	21 May, 15:00	Queensway Stadium	S Race	273
Coventry Bears	18–26	Gloucestershire All Golds	21 May, 15:00	Butts Park Arena	M Rossleigh	323

=== Round 9 ===
Home	Score	Away	Match Information
Home	Score	Away	Date and Time	Venue	Referee	Attendance
Keighley Cougars	74–6	South Wales Ironmen	3 June, 18:00	Cougar Park	B Robinson	532
Barrow Raiders	28–20	Hunslet	3 June, 18:30	Craven Park	C Straw	913
Toronto Wolfpack	54–12	Coventry Bears	3 June, 21:30	Lamport Stadium	N Bennett	6,973
Hemel Stags	20–26	North Wales Crusaders	4 June, 14:00	Pennine Way	B Pearson	107
Oxford	12–48	Whitehaven	4 June, 14:00	Tilsley Park	A Sweet	130
Gloucestershire All Golds	10–56	Newcastle Thunder	4 June, 15:00	Prince of Wales Stadium	M Rossleigh	223
Workington Town	26–30	Doncaster	4 June, 15:00	Derwent Park	G Dolan	522
York City Knights	36–18	London Skolars	4 June, 15:00	Bootham Crescent	S Race	782

=== Round 10 ===
Home	Score	Away	Match Information
Home	Score	Away	Date and Time	Venue	Referee	Attendance
London Skolars	31–18	Oxford	10 June, 15:00	New River Stadium	M Rossleigh	291
South Wales Ironmen	0–66	Toronto Wolfpack	10 June, 15:00	The Wern	G Poumes	462
North Wales Crusaders	24–25	Workington Town	11 June, 14:30	Queensway Stadium	A Sweet	358
Whitehaven	62–6	Gloucestershire All Golds	11 June, 15:00	Recreation Ground	N Bennett	532
Newcastle Thunder	36–12	Keighley Cougars	11 June, 15:00	Kingston Park	J Roberts	786
Coventry Bears	28–24	Hemel Stags	11 June, 15:00	Butts Park Arena	M Griffiths	357
Doncaster	24–24	Barrow Raiders	11 June, 15:00	Keepmoat Stadium	S Race	563
Hunslet	20–52	York City Knights	11 June, 15:00	South Leeds Stadium	G Dolan	589

=== Round 11 ===
Home	Score	Away	Match Information
Home	Score	Away	Date and Time	Venue	Referee	Attendance
Doncaster	29–24	Hunslet	2 April, 15:00	Keepmoat Stadium	S Race	604
Barrow Raiders	28–4	North Wales Crusaders	17 June, 18:30	Craven Park	B Robinson	835
Hemel Stags	20–32	Gloucestershire All Golds	18 June, 14:00	Pennine Way	T Crashley	102
Oxford	0–52	Newcastle Thunder	18 June, 14:00	Tilsley Park	B Pearson	120
York City Knights	16–18	Whitehaven	18 June, 15:00	Bootham Crescent	S Race	1,150
South Wales Ironmen	24–22	Coventry Bears	18 June, 15:00	The Wern	A Sweet	156
Keighley Cougars	45–26	London Skolars	18 June, 15:00	Cougar Park	N Bennett	457
Workington Town	12–58	Toronto Wolfpack	18 June, 16:30	Derwent Park	G Dolan	835

=== Round 12 ===
Home	Score	Away	Match Information
Home	Score	Away	Date and Time	Venue	Referee	Attendance
London Skolars	10–20	Barrow Raiders	24 June, 15:00	New River Stadium	G Poumes	374
Toronto Wolfpack	56–12	Hunslet	25 June, 00:00	Lamport Stadium	T Grant	6,042
North Wales Crusaders	36–12	South Wales Ironmen	25 June, 14:30	Queensway Stadium	N Bennett	402
Whitehaven	25–20	Doncaster	25 June, 15:00	Recreation Ground	A Sweet	606
Keighley Cougars	18–25	York City Knights	25 June, 15:00	Cougar Park	T Crashley	927
Coventry Bears	28–29	Workington Town	25 June, 15:00	Butts Park Arena	C Smith	571
Newcastle Thunder	48–12	Hemel Stags	25 June, 15:00	Kingston Park	L Staveley	620
Gloucestershire All Golds	38–10	Oxford	25 June, 15:00	Prince of Wales Stadium	M Mannifield	275

=== Round 13 ===
Home	Score	Away	Match Information
Home	Score	Away	Date and Time	Venue	Referee	Attendance
Barrow Raiders	36–6	Gloucestershire All Golds	1 July, 18:30	Craven Park	L Moore	696
Toronto Wolfpack	64–22	York City Knights	2 July, 00:00	Lamport Stadium	J McMullen	5,646
Hemel Stags	25–18	South Wales Ironmen	2 July, 14:00	Pennine Way	C Worlsey	131
Oxford	20–52	North Wales Crusaders	2 July, 14:00	Tilsley Park	M Rossleigh	140
Workington Town	46–16	London Skolars	2 July, 15:00	Derwent Park	T Crashley	479
Doncaster	10–20	Newcastle Thunder	2 July, 15:00	Keepmoat Athlestics Ground	G Dolan	550
Hunslet	56–24	Coventry Bears	2 July, 15:00	South Leeds Stadium	A Sweet	406
Whitehaven	28–22	Keighley Cougars	2 July, 15:00	Recreation Ground	M Griffiths	704

=== Round 14 ===
Home	Score	Away	Match Information
Home	Score	Away	Date and Time	Venue	Referee	Attendance
London Skolars	30–16	Hunslet	8 July, 15:00	New River Stadium	M Rossleigh	367
Barrow Raiders	80–10	Oxford	8 July, 18:30	Craven Park	J McMullen	750
Toronto Wolfpack	62–10	Gloucestershire All Golds	9 July, 21:30	Lamport Stadium	B Robinson	7,139
South Wales Ironmen	12–70	Doncaster	9 July, 15:00	The Wern	J Roberts	130
Newcastle Thunder	68–20	Coventry Bears	9 July, 15:00	Kingston Park	C Straw	567
North Wales Crusaders	12–12	Whitehaven	9 July, 15:00	Queensway Stadium	A Sweet	387
York City Knights	68–6	Hemel Stags	9 July, 15:00	Bootham Crescent	G Dolan	787
Workington Town	30–30	Keighley Cougars	9 July, 15:00	Derwent Park	S Race	581

=== Round 15 ===
Home	Score	Away	Match Information
Home	Score	Away	Date and Time	Venue	Referee	Attendance
Toronto Wolfpack	74–16	Hemel Stags	15 July, 21:30	Lamport Stadium	N Bennett	7,247
Whitehaven	32–6	Barrow Raiders	16 July, 14:00	Recreation Ground	J Roberts	1,502
Gloucestershire All Golds	4–42	Doncaster	16 July, 15:00	Prince of Wales Stadium	C Straw	200
Hunslet	26–25	Newcastle Thunder	16 July, 15:00	South Leeds Stadium	M Griffiths	429
London Skolars	36–16	South Wales Ironmen	16 July, 15:00	New River Stadium	S Race	225
Keighley Cougars	92–6	Oxford	16 July, 15:00	Cougar Park	B Robinson	670
Coventry Bears	13–36	North Wales Crusaders	16 July, 15:00	Butts Park Arena	T Crashley	422
York City Knights	34–0	Workington Town	16 July, 15:00	Bootham Crescent	A Sweet	1,011

== Super 8s ==
=== Round 1 ===
Home	Score	Away	Match Information
Home	Score	Away	Date and Time	Venue	Referee	Attendance
Doncaster	24–32	Keighley Cougars	30 July, 15:00	Keepmoat Stadium	J Roberts	501
Newcastle Thunder	14–30	Workington Town	30 July, 15:00	Kingston Park	A Sweet	655
Whitehaven	2–15	Barrow Raiders	30 July, 15:00	Recreation Ground	G Hewer	1,062
York City Knights	26–16	Toronto Wolfpack	30 July, 15:00	Bootham Crescent	T Grant	2,602

=== Round 2 ===
Home	Score	Away	Match Information
Home	Score	Away	Date and Time	Venue	Referee	Attendance
Barrow Raiders	14–10	Doncaster	6 August, 15:00	Craven Park	G Dolan	836
Keighley Cougars	22–20	York City Knights	6 August, 15:00	Cougar Park	C Straw	1,362
Whitehaven	27–6	Newcastle Thunder	6 August, 15:00	Recreation Ground	S Race	539
Workington Town	0–68	Toronto Wolfpack	6 August, 15:00	Derwent Park	J Roberts	592

=== Round 3 ===
Home	Score	Away	Match Information
Home	Score	Away	Date and Time	Venue	Referee	Attendance
Newcastle Thunder	28–30	Barrow Raiders	12 August, 19:00	Kingston Park	C Straw	850
Doncaster	30–22	Whitehaven	13 August, 15:00	Keepmoat Stadium	G Dolan	525
Keighley Cougars	26–26	Toronto Wolfpack	13 August, 15:00	Cougar Park	A Sweet	922
York City Knights	28–18	Workington Town	13 August, 15:00	Bootham Crescent	N Bennett	1,122

=== Round 4 ===
Home	Score	Away	Match Information
Home	Score	Away	Date and Time	Venue	Referee	Attendance
Toronto Wolfpack	50–0	Newcastle Thunder	19 August, 21:30	Lamport Stadium	B Robinson	7,522
Barrow Raiders	26–19	York City Knights	20 August, 15:00	Craven Park	J Roberts	977
Whitehaven	36–4	Keighley Cougars	20 August, 15:00	Recreation Ground	G Dolan	562
Workington Town	22–21	Doncaster	20 August, 15:00	Derwent Park	T Crashley	441

=== Round 5 ===
Home	Score	Away	Match Information
Home	Score	Away	Date and Time	Venue	Referee	Attendance
Toronto Wolfpack	36–18	Whitehaven	2 September, 21:30	Lamport Stadium	N Bennett	6,134
Barrow Raiders	36–14	Workington Town	3 September, 15:00	Craven Park	S Race	1,021
Newcastle Thunder	34–8	Keighley Cougars	3 September, 15:00	Kingston Park	L Staveley	791
York City Knights	21–21	Doncaster	3 September, 15:00	Bootham Crescent	B Robinson	1,107

=== Round 6 ===
Home	Score	Away	Match Information
Home	Score	Away	Date and Time	Venue	Referee	Attendance
Toronto Wolfpack	26–2	Barrow Raiders	9 September, 21:30	Lamport Stadium	John McCullen	7,972
Doncaster	24–28	Newcastle Thunder	10 September, 15:00	Keepmoat Stadium	John Roberts	536
Keighley Cougars	28–6	Workington Town	10 September, 15:00	Cougar Park	Tom Grant	661
Whitehaven	26–16	York City Knights	10 September, 15:00	Recreation Ground	Tom Crashley	605

=== Round 7 ===
Home	Score	Away	Match Information
Home	Score	Away	Date and Time	Venue	Referee	Attendance
Toronto Wolfpack	26–14	Doncaster	16 September, 21:30	Lamport Stadium	B Pearson	8,456
Barrow Raiders	32–18	Keighley Cougars	17 September, 15:00	Craven Park	N Bennett	1,007
Workington Town	6–56	Whitehaven	17 September, 15:00	Derwent Park	J Smith	927
York City Knights	24–26	Newcastle Thunder	17 September, 15:00	Bootham Crescent	J McMullen	1,181

== Shield ==
=== Round 1 ===
Home	Score	Away	Match Information
Home	Score	Away	Date and Time	Venue	Referee	Attendance
South Wales Ironmen	28–20	Gloucestershire All Golds	29 July, 15:00	Stebonheath Park	C Campbell	212
Hemel Stags	32–26	Oxford	30 July, 14:00	Pennine Way	M Rossleigh	106
North Wales Crusaders	12–40	London Skolars	30 July, 14:30	Queensway Stadium	B Robinson	268
Hunslet	56–10	Coventry Bears	30 July, 15:00	South Leeds Stadium	S Race	384

=== Round 2 ===
Home	Score	Away	Match Information
Home	Score	Away	Date and Time	Venue	Referee	Attendance
Gloucestershire All Golds	40–22	North Wales Crusaders	5 August, 15:00	Prince of Wales Stadium	A Whalley	211
Oxford	10–36	Hunslet	6 August, 14:00	Tilsley Park	J Jones	155
Coventry Bears	29–26	Hemel Stags	6 August, 15:00	Butts Park Arena	B Robinson	256
London Skolars	32–4	South Wales Ironmen	25 August, 18:30	New River Stadium	M Rossleigh	1,020

=== Round 3 ===
Home	Score	Away	Match Information
Home	Score	Away	Date and Time	Venue	Referee	Attendance
Gloucestershire All Golds	30–28	Coventry Bears	12 August, 15:00	Prince of Wales Stadium	G Poumes	178
London Skolars	66–0	Oxford	12 August, 15:00	New River Stadium	M Rossleigh	218
North Wales Crusaders	20–12	Hunslet	13 August, 14:30	Queensway Stadium	B Robinson	306
South Wales Ironmen	4–22	Hemel Stags	13 August, 15:00	Stebonheath Park	T Crashley	192

=== Round 4 ===
Home	Score	Away	Match Information
Home	Score	Away	Date and Time	Venue	Referee	Attendance
Hunslet	32–18	Gloucestershire All Golds	19 August, 15:00	South Leeds Stadium	C Straw	333
Hemel Stags	18–38	North Wales Crusaders	20 August, 14:00	Pennine Way	L Staveley	114
Oxford	22–22	South Wales Ironmen	20 August, 14:00	Tilsley Park	M Rossleigh	65
Coventry Bears	14–50	London Skolars	20 August, 15:00	Butts Park Arena	S Race	268

=== Round 5 ===
Home	Score	Away	Match Information
Home	Score	Away	Date and Time	Venue	Referee	Attendance
London Skolars	42–22	Hemel Stags	2 September, 15:00	New River Stadium	T Crashley	191
North Wales Crusaders	16–22	Coventry Bears	3 September, 14:30	Queensway Stadium	G Dolan	245
Gloucestershire All Golds	12–18	Oxford	3 September, 15:00	Prince of Wales Stadium	M Rossleigh	202
Hunslet	64–7	South Wales Ironmen	3 September, 15:00	South Leeds Stadium	J Roberts	418

=== Round 6 ===
Home	Score	Away	Match Information
Home	Score	Away	Date and Time	Venue	Referee	Attendance
Oxford	28–24	Coventry Bears	9 September, 14:00	Tilsley Park	S Race	110
London Skolars	16–6	Gloucestershire All Golds	9 September, 15:00	New River Stadium	B Robinson	218
South Wales Ironmen	6–54	North Wales Crusaders	9 September, 15:00	Stebonheath Park	M Mannifield	289
Hemel Stags	16–60	Hunslet	10 September, 15:00	Pennine Way	A Sweet	135

=== Round 7 ===
Home	Score	Away	Match Information
Home	Score	Away	Date and Time	Venue	Referee	Attendance
Coventry Bears	58–16	South Wales Ironmen	16 September, 15:00	Butts Park Arena	C Worsley	332
North Wales Crusaders	28–14	Oxford	17 September, 14:30	Queensway Stadium	J Roberts	303
Gloucestershire All Golds	42–28	Hemel Stags	17 September, 15:00	Prince of Wales Stadium	B Stead	305
Hunslet	18–12	London Skolars	17 September, 15:00	South Leeds Stadium	T Grant	450
