= 2018 RFL League 1 results =

Rugby league competition results

The fixture list for the 2018 season was issued on 15 November 2018. The regular season comprised 26 rounds where each team played each other home and away.

All times are UK local time (UTC or UTC+1) on the relevant dates.

== Round 1 ==
Home	Score	Away	Match Information
Home	Score	Away	Date and Time	Venue	Referee	Attendance
Hemel Stags	14–28	Hunslet	18 February 2018, 14:00	Pennine Way Stadium	M. Mannifield	220
North Wales Crusaders	24–24	London Skolars	18 February 2018, 14:30	Queensway Stadium	L. Staveley	306
Doncaster	70–10	Coventry Bears	18 February 2018, 15:00	Keepmoat Stadium	B. Pearson	787
Keighley Cougars	44–34	Workington Town	18 February 2018, 15:00	Cougar Park	M. Griffiths	707
West Wales Raiders	20–82	Newcastle Thunder	2 June 2018, 13:00 (Note: Match originally scheduled for 18 February but postponed due to issues with the medical equipment)	Stebonheath Park	M. Griffiths	272
Whitehaven	0–14	Oldham	18 February 2018, 15:00	Recreation Ground	B. Robinson	785
York City Knights	20–22	Bradford Bulls	18 February 2018, 15:00	Bootham Crescent	M. Rossleigh	4,221

== Round 2 ==
Home	Score	Away	Match Information
Home	Score	Away	Date and Time	Venue	Referee	Attendance
Bradford Bulls	54–16	London Skolars	12 May 2018, 15:00	Odsal Stadium	S. Race	3,041
Coventry Bears	18–58	York City Knights	12 May 2018, 15:00	Butts Park Arena	B. Robinson	252
Hunslet	39–32	Whitehaven	2 June 2018, 15:00	South Leeds Stadium	M. Rossleigh	576
Newcastle Thunder	14–34	Keighley Cougars	22 April 2018, 14:00	Kingston Park	B. Pearson	623
Oldham	74–6	Hemel Stags	13 May 2018, 15:00	Whitebank Stadium	B. Pearson	411
West Wales Raiders	18–70	Doncaster	13 May 2018, 15:00	Stebonheath Park	N. Bennett	188
Workington Town	20–12	North Wales Crusaders	22 April 2018, 15:00	Derwent Park	T. Crashley	597

All games in the division were postponed on 4 March due to ice and snow.

== Round 3 ==
Home	Score	Away	Match Information
Home	Score	Away	Date and Time	Venue	Referee	Attendance
London Skolars	16–60	Newcastle Thunder	10 March 2018, 15:00	New River Stadium	A. Sweet	273
Hemel Stags	16–22	Coventry Bears	11 March 2018, 14:00	Pennine Way stadium	C. Worsley	110
Doncaster	44–6	Whitehaven	11 March 2018, 15:00	Keepmoat Stadium	L. Staveley	782
Hunslet	26–10	North Wales Crusaders	11 March 2018, 15:00	South Leeds Stadium	M. Mannifield	465
Keighley Cougars	6–54	Bradford Bulls	11 March 2018, 15:00	Cougar Park	B. Pearson	2,912
Oldham	22–24	York City Knights	11 March 2018, 15:00	Whitebank Stadium	M. Griffiths	703
Workington Town	74–6	West Wales Raiders	11 March 2018, 15:00	Derwent Park	B. Robinson	614

== Round 4 ==
Home	Score	Away	Match Information
Home	Score	Away	Date and Time	Venue	Referee	Attendance
London Skolars	26–42	Workington Town	24 March 2018, 15:00	New River Stadium	M. Mannifield	328
Newcastle Thunder	20–22	Doncaster	25 March 2018 14:00	Kingston Park	B. Pearson	818
North Wales Crusaders	2–30	Oldham	25 March 2018, 14:30	Queensway Stadium	A. Sweet	449
Bradford Bulls	32–12	Hunslet	25 March 2018, 15:00	Odsal Stadium	B. Robinson	3,688
Coventry Bears	64–6	West Wales Raiders	25 July 2018, 15:00 (Note: Match postponed on 25 March to allow Coventry to play outstanding Challenge Cup fixture.)	Butts Park Arena	C. Worsley	272
Whitehaven	30–6	Hemel Stags	25 March 2018, 15:00	Recreation Ground	J. Roberts	438
York City Knights	26–12	Keighley Cougars	25 March 2018, 15:00	Bootham Crescent	T. Grant	1,481

== Round 5 ==
Home	Score	Away	Match Information
Home	Score	Away	Date and Time	Venue	Referee	Attendance
Hemel Stags	12–18	London Skolars	30 March 2018, 14:00	Pennine Way stadium	C. Worsley	155
Hunslet	22–38	Keighley Cougars	30 March 2018, 14:00	South Leeds Stadium	A. Sweet	471
Coventry Bears	18–32	Newcastle Thunder	30 March 2018, 15:00	Butts Park Arena	B. Robinson	343
Doncaster	14–16	York City Knights	30 March 2018, 15:00	Keepmoat Stadium	B. Pearson	906
West Wales Raiders	6–54	North Wales Crusaders	30 March 2018, 15:00	Stebonheath Park	S. Race	306
Whitehaven	14–12	Workington Town	30 March 2018, 15:00	Recreation Ground	M. Mannifield	1,395
Bradford Bulls	30–12	Oldham	30 March 2018, 18:00	Odsal Stadium	N. Bennett	4,036

== Round 6 ==
Home	Score	Away	Match Information
Home	Score	Away	Date and Time	Venue	Referee	Attendance
London Skolars	76–8	West Wales Raiders	7 April 2018, 15:00	New River Stadium	B. Robinson	198
Coventry Bears	12–44	Whitehaven	8 April 2018, 15:00	Butts Park Arena	A. Sweet	279
Doncaster	28–20	North Wales Crusaders	8 April 2018, 15:00	Keepmoat Stadium	S. Race	668
Keighley Cougars	80–10	Hemel Stags	8 April 2018, 15:00	Cougar Park	J. Roberts	529
Newcastle Thunder	16–26	York City Knights	8 April 2018, 15:00	Kingston Park	B. Pearson	954
Oldham	16–24	Hunslet	8 April 2018, 15:00	Whitebank Stadium	M. Griffiths	544
Workington Town	17–16	Bradford Bulls	8 April 2018, 15:00	Derwent Park	l. Staveley	1,366

== Round 7 ==
Home	Score	Away	Match Information
Home	Score	Away	Date and Time	Venue	Referee	Attendance
Bradford Bulls	52–6	Coventry Bears	15 April 2018, 14:00	Odsal Stadium	B. Pearson	3,545
Doncaster	60–0	Hemel Stags	15 April 2018, 15:00	Keepmoat Stadium	M. Mannifield	580
Hunslet	27–20	Workington Town	15 April 2018, 15:00	South Leeds Stadium	B. Robinson	561
North Wales Crusaders	10–30	Newcastle Thunder	15 April 2018, 15:00	Queensway Stadium	N. Bennett	321
Oldham	32–18	Keighley Cougars	15 April 2018, 15:00	Whitebank Stadium	L. Staveley	530
Whitehaven	84–6	West Wales Raiders	15 April 2018, 15:00	Recreation Ground	S. Race	401
York City Knights	66–6	London Skolars	15 April 2018, 15:00	Bootham Crescent	M. Griffiths	916

== Round 8 ==
Home	Score	Away	Match Information
Home	Score	Away	Date and Time	Venue	Referee	Attendance
North Wales Crusaders	40–16	Hemel Stags	29 April 2018, 14:30	Queensway Stadium	M. Mannifield	215
Coventry Bears	20–28	London Skolars	29 April 2018, 15:00	Butts Park Arena	S. Race	266
Doncaster	6–32	Bradford Bulls	29 April 2018, 15:00	Keepmoat Stadium	B. Pearson	2,780
Keighley Cougars	24–30	Whitehaven	29 April 2018, 15:00	Cougar Park	A. Sweet	648
Newcastle Thunder	28–10	Hunslet	29 April 2018, 15:00	Kingston Park	L. Staveley	837
Workington Town	10–32	Oldham	29 April 2018, 15:00	Derwent Park	N. Bennett	712
York City Knights	144–0	West Wales Raiders	29 April 2018, 15:00	Bootham Crescent	B. Robinson	1,089

== Round 9 ==
Home	Score	Away	Match Information
Home	Score	Away	Date and Time	Venue	Referee	Attendance
London Skolars	18–42	Doncaster	5 May 2018, 15:00	New River Stadium	M. Rossleigh	186
Hemel Stags	12–60	Workington Town	6 May 2018, 14:00	Pennine Way stadium	S. Race	110
Bradford Bulls	124–0	West Wales Raiders	6 May 2018, 15:00	Odsal Stadium	A. Sweet	3,398
Hunslet	24–26	York City Knights	6 May 2018, 15:00	South Leeds Stadium	J. McMullen	729
Keighley Cougars	98–6	Coventry Bears	6 May 2018, 15:00	Cougar Park	M. Mannifield	446
Oldham	28–12	Newcastle Thunder	6 May 2018, 15:00	Whitebank Stadium	N. Bennett	455
Whitehaven	22–25	North Wales Crusaders	6 May 2018, 15:00	Recreation Ground	J. Roberts	603

== Round 10 ==
Home	Score	Away	Match Information
Home	Score	Away	Date and Time	Venue	Referee	Attendance
Newcastle Thunder	16–26	Bradford Bulls	18 May 2018, 19:45	Kingston Park	J. McMullen	4,137
London Skolars	26–44	Whitehaven	19 May 2018, 15:00	New River Stadium	M. Mannifield	346
West Wales Raiders	0–74	Oldham	19 May 2018, 15:00	Stebonheath Park	P. Marklove	424
North Wales Crusaders	28–46	Keighley Cougars	20 May 2018, 14:30	Queensway Stadium	N. Bennett	337
Coventry Bears	4–52	Workington Town	20 May 2018, 15:00	Butts Park Arena	B. Robinson	264
Doncaster	16–35	Hunslet	20 May 2018, 15:00	Keepmoat Stadium	A. Sweet	597
York City Knights	90–0	Hemel Stags	20 May 2018, 15:00	Bootham Crescent	J. Stearne	987

== Round 11 ==
Home	Score	Away	Match Information
Home	Score	Away	Date and Time	Venue	Referee	Attendance
Hemel Stags	0–68	Bradford Bulls	27 May 2018, 14:00	Pennine Way Stadium	M. Mannifield	736
North Wales Crusaders	42–6	Coventry Bears	27 May 2018, 14:30	Queensway Stadium	N. Bennett	301
Hunslet	86–0	West Wales Raiders	27 May 2018, 15:00	South Leeds Stadium	B. Pearson	415
Keighley Cougars	26–18	London Skolars	27 May 2018, 15:00	Cougar Park	J. McMullen	521
Oldham	32–12	Doncaster	3 June 2018, 15:00 (Note: Ground unavailable on 27 May.)	Whitebank Stadium	J. McMullen	453
Whitehaven	26–18	York City Knights	27 May 2018, 15:00	Recreation Ground	T. Crashley	640
Workington Town	38–18	Newcastle Thunder	27 May 2018, 15:00	Derwent Park	M. Griffiths	696

== Round 12 ==
Home	Score	Away	Match Information
Home	Score	Away	Date and Time	Venue	Referee	Attendance
Bradford Bulls	50–12	North Wales Crusaders	9 June 2018, 15:00	Odsal Stadium	J. Robert	3,112
London Skolars	30–37	Hunslet	9 June 2018, 15:00	New River Stadium	N. Bennett	389
West Wales Raiders	12–48	Hemel Stags	9 June 2018, 15:00	Stebonheath Park	M. Rossleigh	319
Coventry Bears	0–60	Oldham	10 June 2018, 15:00	Butts Park Arena	S. Race	337
Doncaster	29–22	Keighley Cougars	10 June 2018, 15:00	Keepmoat Stadium	G. Dolan	678
Newcastle Thunder	30–22	Whitehaven	10 June 2018, 15:00	Kingston Park	M. Griffiths	759
York City Knights	40–8	Workington Town	10 June 2018, 15:00	Bootham Crescent	L Staveley	1,399

== Round 13 ==
Home	Score	Away	Match Information
Home	Score	Away	Date and Time	Venue	Referee	Attendance
Hemel Stags	8–56	Newcastle Thunder	17 June 2018, 14:00	Pennine Way stadium	S. Race	109
North Wales Crusaders	4–31	York City Knights	17 June 2018, 14:30	Queensway Stadium	M. Mannifield	408
Hunslet	40–16	Coventry Bears	17 June 2018, 15:00	South Leeds Stadium	L. Staveley	501
Keighley Cougars	94–0	West Wales Raiders	17 June 2018, 15:00	Cougar Park	C. Worsley	470
Oldham	44–12	London Skolars	17 June 2018, 15:00	Whitebank Stadium	J. Roberts	419
Whitehaven	20–27	Bradford Bulls	17 June 2018, 15:00	Recreation Ground	J. McMullen	1,476
Workington Town	34–6	Doncaster	17 June 2018, 15:00	Derwent Park	B. Pearson	550

== Round 14 ==
Home	Score	Away	Match Information
Home	Score	Away	Date and Time	Venue	Referee	Attendance
London Skolars	28–36	North Wales Crusaders	23 June 2018, 15:00	New River Stadium	M. Rossleigh	275
West Wales Raiders	6–66	Whitehaven	23 June 2018, 15:00	Stebonheath Park	L. Staveley	296
Bradford Bulls	56–14	Doncaster	24 June 2018, 15:00	Odsal Stadium	T. Crashley	4,060
Hunslet	16–12	Oldham	24 June 2018, 15:00	South Leeds Stadium	M. Griffiths	605
Newcastle Thunder	46–12	Coventry Bears	24 June 2018, 15:00	Kingston Park	J. Roberts	903
Workington Town	60–12	Hemel Stags	24 June 2018, 15:00	Derwent Park	N. Bennett	444
Keighley Cougars	14–46	York City Knights	24 June 2018, 15:30	Cougar Park	B. Pearson	698

== Round 15 ==
Home	Score	Away	Match Information
Home	Score	Away	Date and Time	Venue	Referee	Attendance
Coventry Bears	12–62	Bradford Bulls	30 June 2018, 15:00	Butts Park Arena	J. Stearne	1,465
West Wales Raiders	12–62	London Skolars	30 June 2018, 15:00	Stebonheath Park	C. Smith	224
North Wales Crusaders	18–19	Hunslet	1 July 2018, 14:30	Queensway Stadium	A. Sweet	317
Hemel Stags	10–74	Doncaster	1 July 2018, 15:00	Pennine Way Stadium	J. Roberts	108
Oldham	14–16	Workington Town	1 July 2018, 15:00	Whitebank Stadium	T. Crashley	486
Whitehaven	28–14	Keighley Cougars	1 July 2018, 15:00	Recreation Ground	N. Bennett	592
York City Knights	24–6	Newcastle Thunder	1 July 2018, 15:00	Bootham Crescent	S. Race	1,212

== Round 16 ==
Home	Score	Away	Match Information
Home	Score	Away	Date and Time	Venue	Referee	Attendance
Bradford Bulls	24–4	Newcastle Thunder	6 July 2018, 19:45	Odsal Stadium	J. McMullen	3,029
London Skolars	20–24	Coventry Bears	7 July 2018, 15:00	New River Stadium	M. Mannifield	160
Hemel Stags	16–32	Keighley Cougars	8 July 2018, 14:00	Pennine Way stadium	B. Robinson	136
North Wales Crusaders	14–22	Whitehaven	8 July 2018, 14:30	Queensway Stadium	T. Crashley	321
Oldham	102–6	West Wales Raiders	8 July 2018, 15:00	Whitebank Stadium	J. Roberts	274
Workington Town	28–18	Hunslet	8 July 2018, 15:00	Derwent Park	N. Bennett	601
York City Knights	31–16	Doncaster	8 July 2018, 15:00	Bootham Crescent	M. Griffiths	1,311

== Round 17 ==
Home	Score	Away	Match Information
Home	Score	Away	Date and Time	Venue	Referee	Attendance
Keighley Cougars	15–8	Oldham	13 July 2018, 20:00	Cougar Park	C. Worsley	510
London Skolars	20–22	York City Knights	14 July 2018, 15:00	New River Stadium	N. Bennett	258
Doncaster	102–6	West Wales Raiders	15 July 2018, 13:00	LD Nutritions Stadium	B. Robinson	306
Hunslet	16–36	Bradford Bulls	15 July 2018, 13:00	South Leeds Stadium	T. Crashley	1,536
Workington Town	22–24	Whitehaven	15 July 2018, 13:30	Derwent Park	M. Griffiths	1,258
Coventry Bears	20–18	Hemel Stags	15 July 2018, 14:00	Butts Park Arena	P. Marklove	281
Newcastle Thunder	20–24	North Wales Crusaders	15 July 2018, 14:00	Kingston Park	L. Staveley	250

== Round 18 ==
Home	Score	Away	Match Information
Home	Score	Away	Date and Time	Venue	Referee	Attendance
Coventry Bears	30–20	Keighley Cougars	21 July 2018, 14:00	Butts Park Arena	J. Stearne	303
West Wales Raiders	6–46	Workington Town	21 July 2018, 15:00	Stebonheath Park	C. Smith	246
Bradford Bulls	28–30	York City Knights	22 July 2018, 15:00	Odsal Stadium	M. Rossleigh	6,441
Hunslet	14–30	Doncaster	22 July 2018, 15:00	South Leeds Stadium	S. Race	517
Newcastle Thunder	42–14	Hemel Stags	22 July 2018, 15:00	Kingston Park	A. Sweet	676
Oldham	50–6	North Wales Crusaders	22 July 2018, 15:00	Whitebank Stadium	M. Mannifield	466
Whitehaven	28–18	London Skolars	22 July 2018, 15:00	Recreation Ground	B. Robinson	661

== Round 19 ==
Home	Score	Away	Match Information
Home	Score	Away	Date and Time	Venue	Referee	Attendance
London Skolars	12–58	Bradford Bulls	28 July 2018, 15:00	New River Stadium	C. Smith	917
Hemel Stags	30–22	West Wales Raiders	29 July 2018, 14:00	Pennine Way Stadium	M. Smaill	118
North Wales Crusaders	22–36	Workington Town	29 July 2018, 14:30	Queensway Stadium	S. Race	340
Doncaster	26–22	Oldham	29 July 2018, 15:00	Keepmoat Stadium	A. Sweet	647
Keighley Cougars	16–24	Hunslet	29 July 2018, 15:00	Cougar Park	B. Robinson	783
Whitehaven	12–8	Newcastle Thunder	22 July 2018, 15:00	Recreation Ground	M. Mannifield	561
York City Knights	68–6	Coventry Bears	22 July 2018, 15:00	Bootham Crescent	L. Staveley	1,104

== Round 20 ==
Home	Score	Away	Match Information
Home	Score	Away	Date and Time	Venue	Referee	Attendance
West Wales Raiders	6–86	Hunslet	4 August 2018, 15:00	Stebonheath Park	A. Sweet	258
Hemel Stags	28–60	Oldham	5 August 2018, 14:00	Pennine Way stadium	M. Rossleigh	109
Bradford Bulls	46–0	Whitehaven	5 August 2018, 15:00	Odsal Stadium	T. Grant	2,818
Coventry Bears	4–46	Doncaster	5 August 2018, 15:00	Butts Park Arena	S. Race	300
Newcastle Thunder	46–14	London Skolars	5 August 2018, 15:00	Kingston Park	L. Staveley	554
Workington Town	34-12	Keighley Cougars	5 August 2018, 15:00	Derwent Park	M. Mannifield	607
York City Knights	30–0	North Wales Crusaders	5 August 2018, 15:00	Bootham Crescent	G.Dolan	981

== Round 21 ==
Home	Score	Away	Match Information
Home	Score	Away	Date and Time	Venue	Referee	Attendance
West Wales Raiders	0–130	York City Knights	11 August 2018, 15:00	Stebonheath Park	M. Mannifield	196
North Wales Crusaders	0–48	Bradford Bulls	12 August 2018, 14:30	Queensway Stadium	M.Smaill	886
Doncaster	38–6	London Skolars	12 August 2018, 15:00	Keepmoat Stadium	A. Sweet	589
Hunslet	54–6	Hemel Stags	12 August 2018, 15:00	South Leeds Stadium	J. Roberts	610
Keighley Cougars	24–16	Newcastle Thunder	12 August 2018, 15:00	Cougar Park	P. Marklove	732
Oldham	20–0	Whitehaven	12 August 2018, 15:00	Whitebank Stadium	S. Race	413
Workington Town	40–16	Coventry Bears	12 August 2018, 15:00	Derwent Park	J. Jones	556

== Round 22 ==
Home	Score	Away	Match Information
Home	Score	Away	Date and Time	Venue	Referee	Attendance
Hemel Stags	0–50	North Wales Crusaders	19 August 2018, 14:00	Pennine Way stadium	C. Worsley	110
Whitehaven	14–23	Doncaster	19 August 2018, 14:00	Recreation Ground	M. Mannifield	871
Bradford Bulls	18–24	Workington Town	19 August 2018, 15:00	Odsal Stadium	J. McMullen	3,320
Newcastle Thunder	24–18	Oldham	19 August 2018, 15:00	Kingston Park	C. Smith	749
West Wales Raiders	18–28	Coventry Bears	19 August 2018, 15:00	Stebonheath Park	J. Stearne	409
York City Knights	48–6	Hunslet	19 August 2018, 15:00	Bootham Crescent	L. Staveley	1,491
London Skolars	20–6	Keighley Cougars	24 August 2018, 19:00	New River Stadium	M. Rossleigh	1,043

== Round 23 ==
Home	Score	Away	Match Information
Home	Score	Away	Date and Time	Venue	Referee	Attendance
Hemel Stags	13–50	Whitehaven	2 September 2018, 14:00	Pennine Way stadium	B. Pearson	109
North Wales Crusaders	66–0	West Wales Raiders	2 September 2018, 14:30	Queensway Stadium	M. Mannifield	368
Bradford Bulls	54–4	Keighley Cougars	2 September 2018, 15:00	Odsal Stadium	S. Race	3,119
Doncaster	38–21	Newcastle Thunder	2 September 2018, 15:00	Keepmoat Stadium	L. Staveley	741
Hunslet	48–12	London Skolars	2 September 2018, 15:00	South Leeds Stadium	T. Crashley	453
Oldham	58–6	Coventry Bears	2 September 2018, 15:00	Whitebank Stadium	J. McMullen	373
Workington Town	14–18	York City Knights	2 September 2018, 15:00	Derwent Park	M. Griffiths	1,623

== Round 24 ==
Home	Score	Away	Match Information
Home	Score	Away	Date and Time	Venue	Referee	Attendance
London Skolars	76–6	Hemel Stags	8 September 2018, 15:00	New River Stadium	M.Mannfield	172
Newcastle Thunder	50–22	Workington Town	8 September 2018, 17:00	Kingston Park	S.Race	729
Coventry Bears	12–36	North Wales Crusaders	9 September 2018, 15:00	Butts Park Arena	J.Roberts	288
Keighley Cougars	6–50	Doncaster	9 September 2018, 15:00	Cougar Park	A.Sweet	596
West Wales Raiders	0–104	Bradford Bulls	9 September 2018, 15:00	Stebonheath Park	J.Jones	826
Whitehaven	46–10	Hunslet	9 September 2018, 15:00	Recreation Ground	B.Pearson	672
York City Knights	10–6	Oldham	9 September 2018, 15:00	Bootham Crescent	J.McMullan	1,692

== Round 25 ==
Home	Score	Away	Match Information
Home	Score	Away	Date and Time	Venue	Referee	Attendance
West Wales Raiders	6–112	Keighley Cougars	15 September 2018, 14:00	Stebonheath Park	M. Mannifield	218
Hemel Stags	6–56	York City Knights	16 September 2018, 14:00	Pennine Way stadium	A. Sweet	175
North Wales Crusaders	12–36	Doncaster	16 September 2018, 14:30	Queensway Stadium	T. Crashley	296
Hunslet	10–46	Newcastle Thunder	16 September 2018, 15:00	South Leeds Stadium	L. Staveley	560
Oldham	16–24	Bradford Bulls	16 September 2018, 15:00	Whitebank Stadium	M. Rossleigh	1,038
Whitehaven	24–20	Coventry Bears	16 September 2018, 15:00	Recreation Ground	B. Pearson	691
Workington Town	38–6	London Skolars	16 September 2018, 15:00	Derwent Park	S. Race	545

== Round 26 ==
Home	Score	Away	Match Information
Home	Score	Away	Date and Time	Venue	Referee	Attendance
Coventry	14–4	Hunslet	22 September 2018, 15:00	Butts Park Arena	S. Race	380
London Skolars	18–46	Oldham	22 September 2018, 17:30	Trailfinders Sports Ground	N. Bennett	402
Bradford Bulls	52–7	Hemel Stags	23 September 2018, 15:00	Odsal Stadium	L. Staveley	2,855
Doncaster	44–32	Workington Town	23 September 2018, 15:00	Keepmoat Stadium	T. Crashley	689
Keighley Cougars	24–22	North Wales Crusaders	23 September 2018, 15:00	Cougar Park	J. Roberts	592
Newcastle Thunder	98–6	West Wales Raiders	23 September 2018, 15:00	Kingston Park	B. Robinson	889
York City Knights	32–14	Whitehaven	23 September 2018, 15:00	Bootham Crescent	J. Smith	3,223

== Play-off semi-finals ==
Home	Score	Away	Match Information
Home	Score	Away	Date and Time	Venue	Referee	Attendance
Bradford Bulls	47–0	Oldham	30 September 2018, 15:00	Odsal Stadium	J. Smith	2,788
Doncaster	18–30	Workington Town	30 September 2018, 15:00	Keepmoat Stadium	N. Bennett	542

== Promotion Final ==
Home	Score	Away	Match Information
Home	Score	Away	Date and Time	Venue	Referee	Attendance
Bradford Bulls	27–8	Workington Town	7 October 2018, 15:00	Odsal Stadium	M. Griffiths	6,011

== Promotion play-off final ==
Home	Score	Away	Match Information
Home	Score	Away	Date and Time	Venue	Referee	Attendance
Swinton Lions	33–20	Workington Town	14 October 2018, 15:00	Heywood Road	G. Dolan	703
