= 2016 League 1 =

- League: League 1
- Duration: 21 matches
- Teams: 15

2016 Season
- Champions: Rochdale Hornets
- League Leaders: Toulouse Olympique
- Top try-scorer: Kuni Minga (29)

The 2016 League 1, known as the Kingstone Press League 1 for sponsorship reasons, was a semi-professional rugby league football competition played in England, the third tier of the sport in the country.

The 2016 League 1 season was expanded to 15 teams with Toulouse Olympique rejoining the British game. At the end of the weekly rounds the top 8 teams played each other once more in the League 1 Super 8s after which the top 5 teams competed in the play-offs. The bottom 7 teams played each other once more with the top two teams competing for the inaugural League 1 Shield.

== Teams ==
Colors	Club	City	Stadium	Capacity*
	Barrow Raiders	Barrow, Cumbria	Craven Park	7,600
	Coventry Bears	Coventry, West Midlands	Butts Park Arena	4,000
	Doncaster	Doncaster, South Yorkshire	Keepmoat Stadium	15,231
	Gloucestershire All Golds	Cheltenham, Gloucestershire	Prince of Wales Stadium	480
	Hemel Stags	Hemel Hempstead, Hertfordshire	Pennine Way	2,000
	Hunslet Hawks	Leeds, West Yorkshire	South Leeds Stadium	4,000
	Keighley Cougars	Keighley, West Yorkshire	Cougar Park	7,800
	London Skolars	Haringey, London	New River Stadium	5,000
	Newcastle Thunder	Newcastle, Tyne and Wear	Kingston Park	10,200
	North Wales Crusaders	Wrexham, Wales	Racecourse Ground	10,771
	Oxford Rugby League	Oxford, Oxfordshire	Iffley Road	500
	Oxford Rugby League	Abingdon-on-Thames, Oxfordshire	Tilsley Park (Note: In January 2016, Oxford announced that the club had been given approval by the RFL to relocate to Tilsley Park in Abingdon-on-Thames. Oxford used Iffley Road for their home league matches until the installation of a new pitch at Tilsley Park had been completed. Their first match at the new ground was the round 6 fixture against Hunslet.)	500
	Rochdale Hornets	Rochdale, Greater Manchester	Spotland	10,000
	South Wales Scorpions	Caerphilly, Glamorgan Wales	Virginia Park	5,000
	Toulouse Olympique	Toulouse, Haute-Garonne, Occitania	Stade Ernest-Argelès	4,066
	York City Knights	York, North Yorkshire	Bootham Crescent	8,256

*capacity for rugby league games may differ from official stadium capacity.

== Regular season ==
=== Standings ===
Pos	Club	P	W	D	L	For	Ag	Diff	Pts	Qualification
1	Toulouse Olympique	14	13	1	0	702	184	+518	27	League 1 Super 8s
2	Rochdale Hornets	14	12	1	1	547	252	+295	25	League 1 Super 8s
3	York City Knights	14	10	1	3	482	256	+226	21	League 1 Super 8s
4	Doncaster	14	10	0	3	499	304	+195	20	League 1 Super 8s
5	Barrow Raiders	14	9	1	4	529	253	+276	19	League 1 Super 8s
6	Keighley Cougars	14	9	0	5	520	368	+152	18	League 1 Super 8s
7	Hunslet Hawks	14	8	0	6	383	374	+9	16	League 1 Super 8s
8	London Skolars	14	8	0	6	354	376	–22	16	League 1 Super 8s
9	Newcastle Thunder	14	7	1	6	404	368	+36	15	League 1 Shield
10	North Wales Crusaders	14	5	2	7	336	355	–19	12	League 1 Shield
11	Coventry Bears	14	4	1	9	289	460	–171	9	League 1 Shield
12	Gloucestershire All Golds	14	3	0	11	334	479	–145	6	League 1 Shield
13	South Wales Scorpions	14	1	0	13	176	582	–406	2	League 1 Shield
14	Oxford Rugby League	14	1	0	13	176	582	–406	2	League 1 Shield
15	Hemel Stags	14	1	0	13	190	718	–528	2	League 1 Shield

== Super 8s ==
=== Standings ===
Pos	Club	P	W	D	L	For	Ag	Diff	Pts	Qualification
1	Toulouse Olympique	21	20	1	0	990	276	+714	41	Promotion Final
2	Rochdale Hornets	21	16	1	4	709	440	+269	33	Promotion Final
3	Barrow Raiders	21	15	1	5	769	375	+394	31	Playoffs
4	Doncaster	21	14	0	7	683	526	+157	28	Playoffs
5	York City Knights	21	12	1	8	618	461	+157	25	Playoffs
6	Keighley Cougars	21	11	0	10	658	514	+144	22	Season Complete
7	Hunslet Hawks	21	11	0	10	544	550	–6	22	Season Complete
8	London Skolars	21	8	0	13	470	650	–180	16	Season Complete

=== Play-offs ===
Promotion Final
1	Toulouse Olympique	22
2	Rochdale Hornets	24

Play-off semi-finals
Toulouse Olympique	62
5	York City Knights	10
3	Barrow Raiders	46
4	Doncaster	6

Play-off final
Toulouse Olympique	32
Barrow Raiders	22

- Rochdale Hornets and Toulouse Olympique are promoted to the Championship.

== League 1 Shield ==
=== Standings ===
Pos	Club	P	W	D	L	For	Ag	Diff	Pts	Qualification
1	Newcastle Thunder	20	13	1	6	686	460	+226	27	League 1 Shield Final
2	North Wales Crusaders	20	9	2	9	505	469	+36	20	League 1 Shield Final
3	Coventry Bears	20	8	1	11	446	590	–144	17	
4	Gloucestershire All Golds	20	5	0	15	515	644	–129	10	
5	Oxford Rugby League	20	4	0	16	356	843	–487	8	
6	South Wales Scorpions	20	2	0	18	274	723	–449	4	
7	Hemel Stags	20	2	0	18	274	976	–702	4	

=== Final ===
League 1 Shield Final
Date	Winner	Score	Runner up	Venue
18 September 2016	Newcastle Thunder	31–26	North Wales Crusaders	Kingston Park
