= 2020 RFL League 1 =

2020 rugby league competition in the United Kingdom

2020 League 1
- League: League 1
- Duration: Planned: 22 rounds + play-offs Actual: 2 rounds
- Teams: 11

2020 Season

The 2020 RFL League 1 was a professional rugby league football competition played in England and Wales and is the third tier of the sport for Rugby Football League (RFL) affiliated clubs. The sponsors for the league were the bookmakers, Betfred and the league continued to be known as the Betfred League 1.

The league was to follow the same structure that was in place for the 2019 season, consisting of 22 rounds with each of the 11 teams playing 20 fixtures against each other, both home and away, and two bye rounds. The team finishing top would have won automatic promotion to the 2021 Championship and be named league champions for 2020. The teams finishing second to sixth were meet in a series of play-off games culminating in the League 1 Play-Off Final. The winner of this match would also be promoted to the Championship for 2021.

The season did sees the introduction of golden point extra time but no matches went to extra time before the season was suspended and subsequently abandoned. Extra-time was to have consisted of two periods of five minutes but unlike the version in use in the Super League where winner takes all, in League 1 each team would earn a point for a game where the scores finish level at the end of normal time with a third point awarded to the first team to score during extra-time.

On 16 March the structure and timing of the competition was placed in doubt as all rugby league games were suspended until 3 April at least as part of the United Kingdom's response to the coronavirus pandemic. The suspension of the season was extended to indefinite.

A discussion between the RFL and club officials in May saw seven of the 11 clubs reject a suggestion that the season could recommence with games being played behind closed doors. The RFL board met on 20 July and having consulted with the League 1 clubs decided to abandon the 2020 season as the majority of clubs did not support playing behind closed doors. At the date of suspension only two rounds of matches had been played and the season was declared null and void.

== Teams ==
Locations of the 2020 RFL League 1 teams

Colours	Club	City	Stadium	Capacity*
	Barrow Raiders	Barrow-in-Furness, Cumbria	Craven Park, Barrow-in-Furness	7,600
	Coventry Bears	Coventry, West Midlands	Butts Park Arena	4,000
	Doncaster	Doncaster, South Yorkshire	Keepmoat Stadium	15,231
	Hunslet	Leeds, West Yorkshire	South Leeds Stadium	4,000
	Keighley Cougars	Keighley, West Yorkshire	Cougar Park	7,800
	London Skolars	Haringey, London	New River Stadium	2,000
	Newcastle Thunder	Newcastle, Tyne and Wear	Kingston Park	10,200
	North Wales Crusaders	Wrexham, Wales	Queensway Stadium	2,000
	Rochdale Hornets	Rochdale, Greater Manchester	Spotland Stadium	10,249
	West Wales Raiders	Llanelli, Wales	Stebonheath Park	3,700
	Workington Town	Workington, Cumbria	Zebra Claims Stadium	10,000

*capacity for rugby league games may differ from official stadium capacity.

== Results ==
=== Round 1 ===
All the ties in round one were due to be played on 15–16 February but all were postponed. Four due to one or both clubs in the tie being involved in rescheduled Challenge Cup third round ties, the original dates having been affected by Storm Ciara. (Note: Under the RFL operational rules cup ties take priority over league ties) The remaining match (North Wales Crusaders v Doncaster) was postponed due to a waterlogged pitch caused by Storm Dennis.

Home	Score	Away	Match Information
Home	Score	Away	Date and Time	Venue	Referee	Attendance
Newcastle Thunder	–	West Wales Raiders	Postponed (Note: Postponed as Newcastle were involved in a rescheduled Challenge Cup tie on 16 February)	Kingston Park
North Wales Crusaders	–	Doncaster	Postponed (Note: Postponed due to a waterlogged pitch)	Queensway Stadium
Coventry Bears	–	Rochdale Hornets	Postponed (Note: Postponed as Rochdale were involved on a rescheduled Challenge Cup tie on 16 February)	Butts Park Arena
Keighley Cougars	–	Hunslet	Postponed (Note: Postponed as Keighley were involved in a rescheduled Challenge Cup tie on 16 February. Was rescheduled for 10 May but match was never played)	Cougar Park
Workington Town	–	London Skolars	Postponed (Note: Postponed as both clubs were involved in rescheduled Challenge Cup ties on 16 February)	Derwent Park

=== Round 2 ===
Home	Score	Away	Match Information
Home	Score	Away	Date and Time	Venue	Referee	Attendance
London Skolars	16–40	North Wales Crusaders	29 February 2020, 14:30	Allianz Park	M. Mannifield	223
Coventry Bears	8–28	Newcastle Thunder	1 March 2020, 15:00	Butts Park Arena	K. Moore	384
Doncaster	22–32	Barrow Raiders	1 March 2020, 15:00	Keepmoat Stadium	B. Pearson	982
West Wales Raiders	10–50	Hunslet	1 March 2020, 15:00	Stebonheath Park	N. Horton	282
Workington Town	24–6	Keighley Cougars	1 March 2020, 15:00	Derwent Park	T. Crashley	887

=== Round 3 ===
Home	Score	Away	Match Information
Home	Score	Away	Date and Time	Venue	Referee	Attendance
Barrow Raiders	50–6	Coventry Bears	8 March 2020, 15:00	Craven Park	A. Sweet	1,253
Doncaster	50–10	West Wales Raiders	8 March 2020, 15:00	Keepmoat Stadium	N. Bennett	540
Hunslet	29–6	London Skolars	8 March 2020, 15:00	South Leeds Stadium	J. Roberts	501
Newcastle Thunder	30–22	Workington Town	8 March 2020, 15:00	Kingston Park	M. Mannifield	873
Rochdale Hornets	29–14	Keighley Cougars	8 March 2020, 15:00	Crown Oil Arena	L. Staveley	541

== Standings at date of abandonment ==
Pos	Team	Pld	W	D	L	PF	PA	PD	BP	Pts
1	Hunslet	2	2	0	0	79	16	+63	0	4
2	Barrow Raiders	2	2	0	0	82	28	+54	0	4
3	Newcastle Thunder	2	2	0	0	58	30	+28	0	4
4	Doncaster	2	1	0	1	72	42	+30	0	2
5	Workington Town	2	1	0	1	46	36	+10	0	2
6	Rochdale Hornets	1	1	0	0	29	14	+15	0	2
7	North Wales Crusaders	2	1	0	1	46	45	+1	0	2
8	London Skolars	1	0	0	1	16	40	−24	0	0
9	Keighley Cougars	2	0	0	2	20	53	−33	0	0
10	Coventry Bears	2	0	0	2	14	78	−64	0	0
11	West Wales Raiders	2	0	0	2	20	100	−80	0	0

Updated to match(es) played on 8 March 2020. Season abandoned on 20 July 2020. Source:
