= 2019 RFL League 1 results =

Rugby league competition results

The fixture list for the 2019 season was issued on 25 November 2018. The regular season comprises 22 rounds with each of the eleven teams having 20 fixtures and 2 bye rounds.

All times are UK local time (UTC or UTC+1) on the relevant dates.

== Round 1 ==
Home	Score	Away	Match Information
Home	Score	Away	Date and Time	Venue	Referee	Attendance
Newcastle Thunder	26–32	Doncaster	16 February 2019, 14:30	Kingston Park	N. Bennett	1,817
Coventry Bears	28–4	West Wales Raiders	17 February 2019, 15:00	Butts Park Arena	C. Worsley	526
Oldham	28–32	Workington Town	17 February 2019, 15:00	Vestacare Stadium	T. Crashley	765
Whitehaven	28–16	Keighley Cougars	17 February 2019, 15:00	Recreation Ground	S. Race	897
London Skolars	19–18	North Wales Crusaders	11 May 2019, 15:00	New River Stadium	T. Crashley	248

== Round 2 ==
Home	Score	Away	Match Information
Home	Score	Away	Date and Time	Venue	Referee	Attendance
West Wales Raiders	18–28	London Skolars	23 February 2019, 15:00	Stebonheath Park	C. Smith	250
Coventry Bears	32–28	Newcastle Thunder	24 February 2019, 15:00	Butts Park Arena	T. Crashley	360
Doncaster	18–20	Hunslet	24 February 2019, 15:00	Keepmoat Stadium	S. Race	734
Oldham	36–12	Whitehaven	24 February 2019, 15:00	Vestacare Stadium	C. Worsley	546
Workington Town	48–18	North Wales Crusaders	24 February 2019, 15:00	Derwent Park	A. Sweet	901

== Round 3 ==
Home	Score	Away	Match Information
Home	Score	Away	Date and Time	Venue	Referee	Attendance
London Skolars	12–48	Newcastle Thunder	2 March 2019, 15:00	New River Stadium	A. Sweet	302
Doncaster	20–10	Workington Town	3 March 2019, 15:00	Keepmoat Stadium	T. Crashley	640
Hunslet	58–4	West Wales Raiders	3 March 2019, 15:00	South Leeds Stadium	P. Marklove	560
Keighley Cougars	40–8	Coventry Bears	3 March 2019, 15:00	Cougar Park	J. Roberts	915
North Wales Crusaders	14–16	Oldham	3 March 2019, 15:00	Queensway Stadium	M. Rossleigh	426

== Round 4 ==
Home	Score	Away	Match Information
Home	Score	Away	Date and Time	Venue	Referee	Attendance
London Skolars	18–18	Keighley Cougars	16 March 2019, 15:00	New River Stadium	M. Rossleigh	262
Coventry Bears	41–30	Workington Town	11 May 2019, 15:00 (Note: Match postponed from original date of 17 March due to Workington playing rescheduled Challenge Cup match on same date.)	Ivor Preece Field	S. Race	303
Newcastle Thunder	56–6	West Wales Raiders	17 March 2019, 15:00	Kingston Park	L. Staveley	678
North Wales Crusaders	12–22	Hunslet	17 March 2019, 15:00	Queensway Stadium	J. McMullen	317
Whitehaven	26–8	Doncaster	17 March 2019, 15:00	Recreation Ground	T. Crashley	702

== Round 5 ==
Home	Score	Away	Match Information
Home	Score	Away	Date and Time	Venue	Referee	Attendance
West Wales Raiders	16–30	Whitehaven	23 March 2019, 15:00	Stebonheath Park	B. Pearson	173
Hunslet	44–10	Coventry Bears	24 March 2019, 15:00	South Leeds Stadium	J. Roberts	542
Keighley Cougars	24–22	North Wales Crusaders	24 March 2019, 15:00	Cougar Park	A. Sweet	859
Oldham	34–4	London Skolars	24 March 2019, 15:00	Vestacare Stadium	N. Bennett	709
Workington Town	32–30	Newcastle Thunder	24 March 2019, 15:00	Derwent Park	C. Worsley	859

== Round 6 ==
Home	Score	Away	Match Information
Home	Score	Away	Date and Time	Venue	Referee	Attendance
London Skolars	34–32	Workington Town	6 April 2019, 12:15	New River Stadium	N. Bennett	629
West Wales Raiders	12–56	Keighley Cougars	6 April 2019, 15:00	Stebonheath Park	A. Moore	238
Doncaster	44–18	Coventry Bears	7 April 2019, 15:00	Keepmoat Stadium	C. Worsley	562
Newcastle Thunder	28–22	Oldham	7 April 2019, 15:00	Kingston Park	M. Mannifield	889
Whitehaven	16–12	Hunslet	7 April 2019, 15:00	Recreation Ground	L. Staveley	724

== Round 7 ==
Home	Score	Away	Match Information
Home	Score	Away	Date and Time	Venue	Referee	Attendance
Coventry Bears	28–30	London Skolars	19 April 2019, 15:00	Butts Park Arena	T. Crashley	353
Keighley Cougars	26–18	Doncaster	19 April 2019, 15:00	Cougar Park	C. Worsley	1,040
North Wales Crusaders	70–8	West Wales Raiders	19 April 2019, 15:00	Queensway Stadium	M. Smaill	282
Oldham	28–36	Hunslet	19 April 2019, 15:00	Vestacare Stadium	J. Roberts	652
Workington Town	18–33	Whitehaven	19 April 2019, 15:00	Derwent Park	N. Bennett	1,981

== Round 8 ==
Home	Score	Away	Match Information
Home	Score	Away	Date and Time	Venue	Referee	Attendance
West Wales Raiders	8–72	Oldham	27 April 2019, 15:00	Stebonheath Park	B. Robinson	197
Doncaster	10–12	North Wales Crusaders	28 April 2019, 15:00	Keepmoat Stadium	J. Stearne	658
Hunslet	26–42	London Skolars	28 April 2019, 15:00	South Leeds Stadium	A. Moore	661
Keighley Cougars	32–26	Workington Town	28 April 2019, 15:00	Cougar Park	S. Race	948
Whitehaven	12–12	Newcastle Thunder	28 April 2019, 15:00	Recreation Ground	M. Mannifield	852

== Round 9 ==
Home	Score	Away	Match Information
Home	Score	Away	Date and Time	Venue	Referee	Attendance
London Skolars	22–6	Doncaster	18 May 2019, 15:00	New River Stadium	T. Crashley	608
Newcastle Thunder	40–12	Keighley Cougars	19 May 2019, 15:00	Kingston Park	A. Sweet	1,423
North Wales Crusaders	14–28	Whitehaven	19 May 2019, 15:00	Queensway Stadium	J. Stearne	342
Oldham	34–18	Coventry Bears	19 May 2019, 15:00	Vestacare Stadium	B. Milligan	451
Workington Town	12–4	Hunslet	19 May 2019, 15:00	Derwent Park	N. Bennett	610

== Round 10 ==
Home	Score	Away	Match Information
Home	Score	Away	Date and Time	Venue	Referee	Attendance
Whitehaven	32–6	London Skolars	25 May 2019, 18:00	Recreation Ground	J. McMullen	811
Keighley Cougars	12–52	Oldham	25 May 2019, 18:30	Cougar Park	A. Sweet	836
Coventry Bears	18–34	North Wales Crusaders	26 May 2019, 15:00	Ivor Preece Field	L. Staveley	396
Doncaster	54–0	West Wales Raiders	26 May 2019, 15:00	Keepmoat Stadium	K. Moore	526
Newcastle Thunder	18–32	Hunslet	26 May 2019, 15:00	Kingston Park	T. Crashley	624

== Round 11 ==
Home	Score	Away	Match Information
Home	Score	Away	Date and Time	Venue	Referee	Attendance
Hunslet	34–0	Keighley Cougars	7 June 2019, 19:45	South Leeds Stadium	A. Sweet	668
West Wales Raiders	12–58	Workington Town	8 June 2019, 15:00	Stebonheath Park	P. Marklove	321
Whitehaven	32–18	Coventry Bears	9 June 2019, 15:00	Recreation Ground	A. Moore	915
North Wales Crusaders	12–48	Newcastle Thunder	9 June 2019, 15:00	Queensway Stadium	M. Mannifield	302
Doncaster	31–0	Oldham	9 June 2019, 17:30	Keepmoat Stadium	T. Crashley	678

== Round 12 ==
Home	Score	Away	Match Information
Home	Score	Away	Date and Time	Venue	Referee	Attendance
Hunslet	20–22	Doncaster	14 June 2019, 19:45	South Leeds Stadium	S. Race	664
London Skolars	51–6	West Wales Raiders	15 June 2019, 15:00	New River Stadium	B. Robinson	290
Newcastle Thunder	26–20	Whitehaven	16 June 2019, 15:00	Kingston Park	C. Worsley	1,079
Oldham	28–4	Keighley Cougars	16 June 2019, 15:00	Vestacare Stadium	K. Moore	591
Workington Town	54–16	Coventry Bears	16 June 2019, 15:00	Borough Park	B. Milligan	895

== Round 13 ==
Home	Score	Away	Match Information
Home	Score	Away	Date and Time	Venue	Referee	Attendance
Keighley Cougars	38–26	London Skolars	22 June 2019, 15:00	Cougar Park	M. Smaill	686
West Wales Raiders	10–72	Hunslet	22 June 2019, 15:00	Stebonheath Park	C. Smith	283
Doncaster	18–19	Newcastle Thunder	23 June 2019, 15:00	Keepmoat Stadium	M. Rossleigh	549
Whitehaven	22–24	North Wales Crusaders	23 June 2019, 15:00	Recreation Ground	N. Bennett	781
Workington Town	16–26	Oldham	23 June 2019, 15:00	Borough Park	S. Race	1,013

== Round 14 ==
Home	Score	Away	Match Information
Home	Score	Away	Date and Time	Venue	Referee	Attendance
London Skolars	6–28	Whitehaven	29 June 2019, 15:00	New River Stadium	J. McMullen	442
North Wales Crusaders	14–6	Keighley Cougars	30 June 2019, 14:30	Queensway Stadium	K. Moore	315
Coventry Bears	10–54	Doncaster	29 June 2019, 15:00	Ivor Preece Field	A. Moore	386
Newcastle Thunder	48–10	Workington Town	30 June 2019, 15:00	Kingston Park	T. Crashley	1,077
Oldham	56–6	West Wales Raiders	30 June 2019, 15:00	Vestacare Stadium	L. Staveley	552

== Round 15 ==
Home	Score	Away	Match Information
Home	Score	Away	Date and Time	Venue	Referee	Attendance
London Skolars	20–36	Coventry Bears	6 July 2019, 15:00	New River Stadium	C. Smith	216
West Wales Raiders	0–72	Doncaster	6 July 2019, 15:00	Stebonheath Park	A. Sweet	198
Hunslet	12–26	Newcastle Thunder	7 July 2019, 15:00	South Leeds Stadium	M. Rossleigh	746
North Wales Crusaders	30–18	Workington Town	7 July 2019, 15:00	Queensway Stadium	J. McMullen	363
Whitehaven	16–10	Oldham	7 July 2019, 15:00	Recreation Ground	T. Crashley	1,102

== Round 16 ==
Home	Score	Away	Match Information
Home	Score	Away	Date and Time	Venue	Referee	Attendance
Coventry Bears	20–48	Hunslet	14 July 2019, 15:00	Webb Ellis Road, Rugby	T. Crashley	420
Doncaster	12–22	Whitehaven	14 July 2019, 15:00	LD Nutrition Stadium, Featherstone	B. Pearson	780
Keighley Cougars	50–18	West Wales Raiders	14 July 2019, 15:00	Cougar Park	J. Stearne	702
Oldham	46–30	North Wales Crusaders	14 July 2019, 15:00	Vestacare Stadium	L. Staveley	616
Workington Town	32–22	London Skolars	14 July 2019, 15:00	Borough Park	A. Moore	810

== Round 17 ==
Home	Score	Away	Match Information
Home	Score	Away	Date and Time	Venue	Referee	Attendance
Newcastle Thunder	34–16	London Skolars	20 July 2019, 15:00	Kingston Park	C. Worsley	1,098
West Wales Raiders	44–16	Coventry Bears	20 July 2019, 15:00	Stebonheath Park	M. Smaill	352
North Wales Crusaders	0–30	Doncaster	21 July 2019, 15:00	Queensway Stadium	M. Mannifield	372
Workington Town	52–4	Keighley Cougars	21 July 2019, 15:00	Derwent Park	K. Moore	947
Hunslet	12–19	Whitehaven	27 July 2019, 15:00	South Leeds Stadium	M. Mannifield	540

== Round 18 ==
Home	Score	Away	Match Information
Home	Score	Away	Date and Time	Venue	Referee	Attendance
London Skolars	14–15	Oldham	3 August 2019, 15:00	New River Stadium	L. Staveley	355
West Wales Raiders	6–68	Newcastle Thunder	3 August 2019, 15:00	Stebonheath Park	J. McMullen	302
Coventry Bears	20–46	Keighley Cougars	4 August 2019, 15:00	Webb Ellis Road	A. Moore	345
Hunslet	42–18	North Wales Crusaders	4 August 2019, 15:00	South Leeds Stadium	K. Moore	488
Whitehaven	12–12	Workington Town	4 August 2019, 15:00	Recreation Ground	M. Rossleigh	2,360

== Round 19 ==
Home	Score	Away	Match Information
Home	Score	Away	Date and Time	Venue	Referee	Attendance
Keighley Cougars	10–32	Hunslet	10 August 2019, 18:00	Cougar Park	N. Bennett	522
Doncaster	23–22	London Skolars	11 August 2019, 15:00	Keepmoat Stadium	S. Race	585
North Wales Crusaders	33–16	Coventry Bears	11 August 2019, 15:00	Queensway Stadium	C. Smith	256
Oldham	28–20	Newcastle Thunder	11 August 2019, 15:00	Vestacare Stadium	M. Rossleigh	702
Workington Town	66–22	West Wales Raiders	11 August 2019, 15:00	Derwent Park	B. Milligan	908

== Round 20 ==
Home	Score	Away	Match Information
Home	Score	Away	Date and Time	Venue	Referee	Attendance
West Wales Raiders	16–56	North Wales Crusaders	17 August 2019, 15:00	Stebonheath Park	B. Milligan	272
Keighley Cougars	19–48	Whitehaven	18 August 2019, 15:00	Cougar Park	M. Mannifield	782
Newcastle Thunder	88–6	Coventry Bears	18 August 2019, 15:00	Kingston Park	A. Sweet	711
Oldham	40–14	Doncaster	18 August 2019, 15:00	Vestacare Stadium	J. McMullen	745
London Skolars	30–34	Hunslet	23 August 2019, 18:00	New River Stadium	M. Rossleigh	1,035

== Round 21 ==
Home	Score	Away	Match Information
Home	Score	Away	Date and Time	Venue	Referee	Attendance
Coventry Bears	6–50	Oldham	1 September 2019, 15:00	Webb Ellis Road	L. Staveley	280
Doncaster	48–12	Keighley Cougars	1 September 2019, 15:00	Keepmoat Stadium	J. Stearne	892
Hunslet	16–30	Workington Town	1 September 2019, 15:00	South Leeds Stadium	T. Crashley	521
Newcastle Thunder	46–22	North Wales Crusaders	1 September 2019, 15:00	Kingston Park	J. McMullen	883
Whitehaven	74–6	West Wales Raiders	1 September 2019, 15:00	Recreation Ground	C. Smith	972

== Round 22 ==
Home	Score	Away	Match Information
Home	Score	Away	Date and Time	Venue	Referee	Attendance
Coventry Bears	0–72	Whitehaven	7 September 2019, 14:00	Webb Ellis Road	A. Sweet	652
North Wales Crusaders	36–18	London Skolars	7 September 2019, 15:00	Queensway Stadium	K. Moore	421
Hunslet	20–34	Oldham	8 September 2019, 15:00	South Leeds Stadium	J. McMullen	688
Keighley Cougars	22–32	Newcastle Thunder	8 September 2019, 15:00	Cougar Park	L. Staveley	825
Workington Town	4–30	Doncaster	8 September 2019, 15:00	Derwent Park	G. Hewer	1,201

== Elimination and qualifying finals ==
Match	Home	Score	Away	Match Information
Match	Home	Score	Away	Date and Time	Venue	Referee	Attendance
EF	Hunslet	24–32	Workington Town	15 September 2019; 15:00	South Leeds Stadium	T. Grant	332
QF	Newcastle Thunder	6–20	Doncaster	15 September 2019; 14:30	Kingston Park	B. Pearson	668

== Semi-finals ==
Match	Home	Score	Away	Match Information
Match	Home	Score	Away	Date and Time	Venue	Referee	Attendance
SF1	Newcastle Thunder	38–18	Workington Town	22 September 2019, 14:30	Kingston Park	J. Child	678
SF2	Oldham	22–12	Doncaster	22 September 2019, 14:00	Vestacare Stadium	L. Moore	529

== Preliminary final ==
Home	Score	Away	Match Information
Home	Score	Away	Date and Time	Venue	Referee	Attendance
Newcastle Thunder	34–4	Doncaster	29 September 2019, 12:00	Kingston Park	J. Smith	480

== Play-off final ==
Home	Score	Away	Match Information
Home	Score	Away	Date and Time	Venue	Referee	Attendance
Oldham	18–14	Newcastle Thunder	6 October 2019, 15:00	Vestacare Stadium	G. Hewer	1,203
