= 2013 Championship 1 season results =

Rugby league competition results

This is a list of the 2013 Championship 1 season results. Championship 1 is the third-tier rugby league competition in the United Kingdom. The 2013 season starts on 29 March (Good Friday) and ends on 29 September with the Grand Final at Leigh Sports Village in Leigh, Greater Manchester, which replaces the previous venue of the Halliwell Jones Stadium in Warrington. It is the first season in the Rugby Football League for three teams, Hemel Stags, Oxford Rugby League and University of Gloucestershire All Golds.

The 2013 season consists of two stages. The regular season was played over 18 round-robin fixtures, in which each of the nine teams involved in the competition played each other once at home and once away. This means that teams will play 16 games and will have two bye-rounds, where they will not play a game. In the Championship 1, a win was worth three points in the table, a draw worth two points apiece, and a loss by less than 12 points during the game earned one bonus point. Defeats by more than 12 points yielded no points.

At the end of the regular season, the team finishing first in the table will be crowned Championship and will be promoted to the Championship. The teams who finish the regular season between second and sixth will enter the play-offs with the winner claiming the second promotion place.

== Regular season ==
=== Round 1 ===
Home	Score	Away	Match information
Home	Score	Away	Date and time	Venue	Referee	Attendance
Gloucestershire All Golds	30–40	Oxford Rugby League	29 March, 15:00 GMT	Prince of Wales stadium	Jamie Bloem	323
London Skolars	8–26	Hemel Stags	29 March, 15:00 GMT	New River Stadium	Clint Sharrad	419
Oldham R.L.F.C.	18–28	Rochdale Hornets	29 March, 15:00 GMT	Whitebank Stadium	Tom Crashley	664
South Wales Scorpions	12–34	North Wales Crusaders	1 April, 15:00 BST	The Gnoll	Warren Turley	675
Bye-round: Gateshead Thunder

=== Round 2 ===
Home	Score	Away	Match information
Home	Score	Away	Date and time	Venue	Referee	Attendance
Oxford Rugby League	20–22	South Wales Scorpions	13 April, 14:30 BST	Iffley Road	Jamie Bloem	352
North Wales Crusaders	44–6	London Skolars	14 April, 14:30 BST	Racecourse Ground	Clint Sharrad	761
Gloucestershire All Golds	0–36	Oldham R.L.F.C.	14 April, 15:00 BST	Prince of Wales Stadium	Joe Cobb	105
Hemel Stags	21–20	Gateshead Thunder	14 April, 15:00 BST	Pennine Way stadium	Dave Sharpe	263
Bye-round: Rochdale Hornets

=== Round 3 ===
Home	Score	Away	Match information
Home	Score	Away	Date and time	Venue	Referee	Attendance
North Wales Crusaders	52–8	Gateshead Thunder	28 April, 14:30 BST	Racecourse Ground	Dave Sharpe	752
Hemel Stags	28–8	Gloucestershire All Golds	28 April, 15:00 BST	Pennine Way stadium	Jamie Bloem	319
Oldham R.L.F.C.	16–18	Oxford Rugby League	28 April, 15:00 BST	Whitebank Stadium	Clint Sharrad	602
South Wales Scorpions	30–28	Rochdale Hornets	28 April, 15:00 BST	The Gnoll	Warren Turley	267
Bye-round: London Skolars

=== Round 4 ===
Home	Score	Away	Match information
Home	Score	Away	Date and time	Venue	Referee	Attendance
Gateshead Thunder	30–10	Gloucestershire All Golds	5 May, 15:00 BST	Gateshead International Stadium	Clint Sharrad	161
London Skolars	39–20	South Wales Scorpions	5 May, 15:00 BST	New River Stadium	Jamie Bloem	309
Oxford Rugby League	23–22	Hemel Stags	5 May, 15:00 BST	Iffley Road	Dave Sharpe	337
Rochdale Hornets	18–35	North Wales Crusaders	5 May, 15:00 BST	Spotland Stadium	Joe Cobb	769
Bye-round: Oldham R.L.F.C.

=== Round 5 ===
Home	Score	Away	Match information
Home	Score	Away	Date and time	Venue	Referee	Attendance
Gateshead Thunder	16–28	South Wales Scorpions	12 May, 14:00 BST	Gateshead International Stadium	Jamie Bloem	146
Hemel Stags	12–30	Oldham R.L.F.C.	12 May, 15:00 BST	Pennine Way stadium	Dave Sharpe	679
Oxford Rugby League	4–12	North Wales Crusaders	12 May, 15:00 BST	Iffley Road	Ronnie Laughton	374
Rochdale Hornets	32–24	London Skolars	12 May, 15:00 BST	Spotland Stadium	Dave Merrick	523
Bye-round: Gloucestershire All Golds

=== Round 6 ===
Home	Score	Away	Match information
Home	Score	Away	Date and time	Venue	Referee	Attendance
Oldham R.L.F.C.	54–16	Gateshead Thunder	26 May, 13:00 BST	Whitebank Stadium	Jamie Bloem	489
Gloucestershire All Golds	10–54	Rochdale Hornets	26 May, 15:00 BST	Prince of Wales Stadium	Dave Sharpe	203
Hemel Stags	52–24	South Wales Scorpions	26 May, 15:00 BST	Pennine Way stadium	Warren Turley	122
London Skolars	40–34	Oxford Rugby League	26 May, 15:00 BST	New River Stadium	Peter Brooke	409
Bye-round: North Wales Crusaders

=== Round 7 ===
Home	Score	Away	Match information
Home	Score	Away	Date and time	Venue	Referee	Attendance
North Wales Crusaders	66–4	Gloucestershire All Golds	2 June, 14:30 BST	Racecourse Ground	Warren Turley	851
Oldham R.L.F.C.	30–22	London Skolars	2 June, 15:00 BST	Whitebank Stadium	Peter Brooke	515
Oxford Rugby League	27–22	Gateshead Thunder	2 June, 15:00 BST	Iffley Road	Tom Crashley	202
Rochdale Hornets	40–22	Hemel Stags	2 June, 15:00 BST	Spotland Stadium	Clint Sharrad	809
Bye-round: South Wales Scorpions

=== Round 8 ===
Home	Score	Away	Match information
Home	Score	Away	Date and time	Venue	Referee	Attendance
Gateshead Thunder	52–55	London Skolars	9 June, 14:00 BST	Filtrona Park, South Shields^{A}	Jamie Bloem	144
North Wales Crusaders	22–20	Oldham R.L.F.C.	9 June, 14:30 BST	Racecourse Ground	Clint Sharrad	962
Gloucestershire All Golds	18–46	South Wales Scorpions	9 June, 15:00 BST	Prince of Wales Stadium	Peter Brooke	153
Oxford Rugby League	28–42	Rochdale Hornets	9 June, 15:00 BST	Iffley Road	Tom Crashley	349
Bye-round: Hemel Stags

=== Round 9 ===
Home	Score	Away	Match information
Home	Score	Away	Date and time	Venue	Referee	Attendance
Gateshead Thunder	4–46	Rochdale Hornets	16 June, 15:00 BST	Filtrona Park, South Shields^{A}	Peter Brooke	193
Hemel Stags	18–10	North Wales Crusaders	16 June, 15:00 BST	Pennine Way stadium	Joe Cobb	400
London Skolars	38–22	Gloucestershire All Golds	16 June, 15:00 BST	New River Stadium	Tom Crashley	589
South Wales Scorpions	32–36	Oldham R.L.F.C.	16 June, 15:00 BST	The Gnoll	Dave Sharpe	324
Bye-round: Oxford Rugby League

=== Round 10 ===
Home	Score	Away	Match information
Home	Score	Away	Date and time	Venue	Referee	Attendance
Gloucestershire All Golds	16–58	North Wales Crusaders	23 June, 15:00 BST	Prince of Wales Stadium	Dave Sharpe	122
London Skolars	32–16	Rochdale Hornets	23 June, 15:00 BST	New River Stadium	Tom Crashley	343
Oldham R.L.F.C.	26–18	Hemel Stags	23 June, 15:00 BST	Whitebank Stadium	Dave Merrick	428
South Wales Scorpions	6–28	Oxford Rugby League	23 June, 15:00 BST	The Gnoll	Jamie Bloem	311
Bye-round: Gateshead Thunder

=== Round 11 ===
Home	Score	Away	Match information
Home	Score	Away	Date and time	Venue	Referee	Attendance
North Wales Crusaders	48–0	Rochdale Hornets	30 June, 14:30 BST	Racecourse Ground	Tom Crashley	1,086
Gateshead Thunder	12–44	Oldham R.L.F.C.	30 June, 15:00 BST	Filtrona Park, South Shields^{A}	Joe Cobb	301
Oxford Rugby League	18–20	Gloucestershire All Golds	30 June, 15:00 BST	Iffley Road	Dave Sharpe	241
South Wales Scorpions	16–14	Hemel Stags	30 June, 15:00 BST	The Gnoll	Jamie Bloem	366
Bye-round: London Skolars

=== Round 12 ===
Home	Score	Away	Match information
Home	Score	Away	Date and time	Venue	Referee	Attendance
London Skolars	52–24	Gateshead Thunder	7 July, 14:00 BST	New River Stadium	Jamie Bloem	349
Hemel Stags	38–18	Rochdale Hornets	7 July, 15:00 BST	Pennine Way stadium	Dave Sharpe	263
Oxford Rugby League	4–22	Oldham R.L.F.C.	7 July, 15:00 BST	Iffley Road	Tom Crashley	327
South Wales Scorpions	20–32	Gloucestershire All Golds	7 July, 15:00 BST	The Gnoll	Andy Sweet	370
Bye-round: North Wales Crusaders

=== Round 13 ===
Home	Score	Away	Match information
Home	Score	Away	Date and time	Venue	Referee	Attendance
Gateshead Thunder	14–14	Oxford Rugby League	14 July, 15:00 BST	Filtrona Park, South Shields^{A}	Dave Sharpe	121
Oldham R.L.F.C.	52–22	South Wales Scorpions	14 July, 15:00 BST	Whitebank Stadium	Ronnie Laughton	576
Gloucestershire All Golds	18–28	Hemel Stags	31 July, 19:30 BST^{B}	Regentsholme^{C}	Chris Kendall	367
London Skolars	14–20	North Wales Crusaders	23 August, 18:30 BST	New River Stadium	Chris Leatherbarrow	1,276
Bye-round: Rochdale Hornets

=== Round 14 ===
Home	Score	Away	Match information
Home	Score	Away	Date and time	Venue	Referee	Attendance
South Wales Scorpions	30–36	Gateshead Thunder	28 July, 13:00 BST	The Gnoll	Chris Kendall	305
Gloucestershire All Golds	28–35	London Skolars	28 July, 15:00 BST	Prince of Wales Stadium	Jamie Bloem	103
Oldham R.L.F.C.	28–10	North Wales Crusaders	28 July, 15:00 BST	Whitebank Stadium	Dave Merrick	1,209
Rochdale Hornets	54–12	Oxford Rugby League	28 July, 15:00 BST	Spotland Stadium	Clint Sharrad	451
Bye-round: Hemel Stags

=== Round 15 ===
Home	Score	Away	Match information
Home	Score	Away	Date and time	Venue	Referee	Attendance
Gateshead Thunder	20–24	North Wales Crusaders	4 August, 15:00 BST	Gateshead International Stadium	Dave Sharpe	193
Hemel Stags	30–16	Oxford Rugby League	4 August, 15:00 BST	Pennine Way stadium	Andrew Sweet	246
London Skolars	24–44	Oldham R.L.F.C.	4 August, 15:00 BST	New River Stadium	Peter Brooke	563
Rochdale Hornets	36–10	South Wales Scorpions	4 August, 15:00 BST	Spotland Stadium	Dave Merrick	452
Bye-round: Gloucestershire All Golds

=== Round 16 ===
Home	Score	Away	Match information
Home	Score	Away	Date and time	Venue	Referee	Attendance
North Wales Crusaders	44–12	Hemel Stags	11 August, 14:30 BST	Racecourse Ground	Peter Brooke	813
Oldham R.L.F.C.	24–24	Gloucestershire All Golds	11 August, 15:00 BST	Whitebank Stadium	Jamie Bloem	1,025
Rochdale Hornets	29–22	Gateshead Thunder	11 August, 15:00 BST	Spotland Stadium	Clint Sharrad	405
South Wales Scorpions	28–30	London Skolars	11 August, 15:00 BST	The Gnoll	Dave Sharpe	205
Bye-round: Oxford Rugby League

=== Round 17 ===
Home	Score	Away	Match information
Home	Score	Away	Date and time	Venue	Referee	Attendance
Rochdale Hornets	25–30	Oldham R.L.F.C.	15 August, 19:00 BST	Spotland Stadium	Matt Thomason	1,107
North Wales Crusaders	54–10	Oxford Rugby League	18 August, 14:30 BST	Racecourse Ground	Clint Sharrad	809
Gloucestershire All Golds	34–36	Gateshead Thunder	18 August, 15:00 BST	Regentsholme^{C}	Scott Mikalauskas	163
Hemel Stags	18–40	London Skolars	18 August, 15:00 BST	Pennine Way stadium	Andrew Sweet	336
Bye-round: South Wales Scorpions

=== Round 18 ===
Home	Score	Away	Match information
Home	Score	Away	Date and time	Venue	Referee	Attendance
North Wales Crusaders	35–22	South Wales Scorpions	1 September, 14:30 BST	Racecourse Ground	Peter Brooke	1,562
Gateshead Thunder	24–22	Hemel Stags	1 September, 15:00 BST	Gateshead International Stadium	Adam Gill	226
Oxford Rugby League	30–30	London Skolars	1 September, 15:00 BST	Iffley Road	Ronnie Laughton	318
Rochdale Hornets	72–12	Gloucestershire All Golds	1 September, 15:00 BST	Spotland Stadium	Mike Woodhead	522
Bye-round: Oldham R.L.F.C.

== Play-offs ==
The play-offs will commence following the conclusion of the regular season and include the teams who finished second to fifth in the league and uses a 5 team play-off system, culminating in the grand final at Leigh Sports Village in Leigh, home of Championship sides Leigh Centurions and Swinton Lions.

=== Week 1 ===
#	Home	Score	Away	Match information
#	Home	Score	Away	Date and time	Venue	Referee	Attendance
Qualifying Play-off
A	Rochdale Hornets	26–24	London Skolars	8 September 2013, 15:00 BST	Spotland Stadium	Gareth Hewer
Elimination Play-off
B	Hemel Stags	30–26	Oxford Rugby League	8 September 2013, 15:00 BST	Pennine Way stadium	Joe Cobb

=== Week 2 ===
#	Home	Score	Away	Match information
#	Home	Score	Away	Date and time	Venue	Referee	Attendance
Qualifying Semi-final
C	Oldham R.L.F.C.	22–23	Rochdale Hornets	15 September 2013, 15:00 BST	Whitebank Stadium	Gareth Hewer	619
Elimination Semi-final
D	London Skolars	44–28	Hemel Stags	15 September 2013, 15:00 BST	New River Stadium	Joe Cobb	367

=== Week 3 ===
#	Home	Score	Away	Match information
#	Home	Score	Away	Date and time	Venue	Referee	Attendance
Final eliminator
E	Oldham R.L.F.C.	64–8	London Skolars	22 September 2013, 15:00 BST	Whitebank Stadium	George Stokes	467

=== Week 4 ===
#	Home	Score	Away	Match information
#	Home	Score	Away	Date and time	Venue	Referee	Attendance
Grand Final
GF	Rochdale Hornets	32–18	Oldham R.L.F.C.	29 September 2013, 14:00 BST	Leigh Sports Village, Leigh	Chris Leatherbarrow	6,800

=== Play-off ladder ===
Qualifying play-off 8 September 2013
Rochdale Hornets	26
London Skolars	24
Hemel Stags	30
Oxford Rugby League	26

Qualifying semi-final 15 September 2013
Oldham R.L.F.C.	22
Rochdale Hornets	23
Elimination semi-final 15 September 2013
London Skolars	44
Hemel Stags	28

Preliminary final
Oldham R.L.F.C.	64
London Skolars	8

2013 Grand Final; 29 Sep 2013, Leigh
Rochdale Hornets	32
Oldham R.L.F.C.	18

== Notes ==
A. Match moved from Gateshead International Stadium to Filtrona Park, South Shields
B. Match re-arranged 14 July due to Gloucestershire All Golds having ineligible doctor on original date of game
C. Match moved from Prince of Wales Stadium, Cheltenham to Regentsholme, Lydney
