= Terry Hollindrake =

GB international rugby league footballer

Personal information
- Full name: Terrence Hollindrake
- Born: 21 December 1934 Keighley, England
- Died: 29 January 2015 (aged 80) Keighley, England

Playing information
- Position: Fullback, Wing, Centre
Club
| Years | Team | Pld | T | G | FG | P |
|---|---|---|---|---|---|---|
| 1951–60 | Keighley | 221 | 104 | 320^{†} | | 952 |
| 1960–64 | Hull FC | 114 | 50 | 28^{†} | | 206 |
| 1964–68 | Bramley | 144 | 72 | 194^{†} | | 604 |
| 1969–70 | Keighley | 26 | 9 | 4^{†} | | 35 |
| | Total | 505 | 235 | 546 | 0 | 1797 |
Representative
| Years | Team | Pld | T | G | FG | P |
| 1958–59 | Yorkshire | 5 | 1 | | | 3 |
| 1955 | Great Britain | 1 | 0 | 0 | 0 | 0 |
- ^{†}Goal type not recorded. Added to "total goals" Source

Terry Hollindrake (21 December 1934 – 29 January 2015) was an English professional rugby league footballer who played in the 1950s and 1960s, and coached in the 1970s. He played at representative level for Great Britain and Yorkshire, and at club level for Keighley Albion, Keighley (two spells), Hull FC, Bramley and Keighley Shamrocks, as a fullback, wing, or centre and coach at club level.

== Playing career ==
=== Keighley ===
Hollindrake was born in the Keighley area and started his playing career with amateur team, Keighley Albion. Signed by professional club Keighley in December 1951 he made his first team début in January 1953 against Salford. He continued to play for the club on a limited basis during his period of National Service. On resuming his full-time playing career with Keighley, he became an established first team player and in the 1955–1956 season set a new post war club record for the number of tries scored as he scored 26. It was during this season that Hollindrake made his only international appearance when he played on the wing for Great Britain in the third test against New Zealand at Headingley on 17 December 1955.

In the 1957–58 season he beat his own record scoring 27 tries and in the 1959–60 season he became Keighley's then leading scorer.

=== County honours ===
Terry Hollindrake represented Yorkshire in five matches in the 1958–59 season.

=== Hull FC ===
Terry Hollindrake was transferred from Keighley to Hull FC in 1960 for £6,000 (based on increases in average earnings, this would be approximately £272,300 in 2013). In 4 seasons at the club he scored 206 points and appeared in 114 matches.

=== Bramley ===
In 1964 he transferred to Bramley where he spent 4 seasons, appearing in 144 games and scoring 604 points.

=== Return to Keighley ===
Hollindrake left Bramley in 1968 and played a single season for Keighley amateur club, Keighley Shamrocks, before re-signing to Keighley for the 1969–70 season where he played a further 26 games scoring 9 tries and 4 goals before retiring in 1970.

=== Career summary ===
In his professional career, Terry Hollindrake scored 236 tries and 546 goals giving a grand total of 1800 points. He was the first Keighley player to score more than 1000 points, scoring 1001 in all first team appearances (including friendly fixtures).

== Post-playing career ==
Following his retirement Hollindrake became a window cleaner, but remained actively involved in the Keighley RLFC Past Players Association.

As a memorial to Hollindrake, Keighley Cougars renamed the north stand at Cougar Park the Terry Hollindrake Stand at a ceremony before the opening league fixture of the 2015 season.

Terry Hollindrake was inducted into the Keighley Albion virtual Hall of Fame on 17 December 2020.
