= The Wern =

Rugby stadium in Merthyr Tydfil, Wales

- Interactive map of The Wern
- Full name: The Wern Sports Park
- Location: Merthyr Tydfil
- Coordinates: 51.742439°N 3.384731°W
- Capacity: 4,500
- Surface: Artificial turf

Construction
- Opened: 1958

Tenants
- Merthyr RFC (1958-); South Wales Ironmen (2017)

The Wern is a sports stadium in Merthyr Tydfil, Wales. It is the home of rugby union club Merthyr RFC and was, for a short period in 2017, also home of rugby league club South Wales Ironmen. The stadium is located on Cae'r Wern in the east of Merthyr Tydfil, around 10 minutes walk from the town centre. Opened in 1958, there has been expansion and improvements made to facilities in recent years, including the addition of an artificial turf pitch and the construction of additional stands. The stadium is a combination of seating and standing with a total capacity of 4,500.

The stadium is one of two in the town, along with Penydarren Park, home of Merthyr Town F.C.

== Stands ==
There are three covered stands at the Wern along with additional standing room around all sides of the pitch. Access to all stands is via Cae'r Wern.

=== Main Stand ===
This all-seater stand is raised above the pitch with a set of steps up to the first row of seating. The changing rooms and media facilities are located in this stand.

=== Sir Gilbert Stanley Thomas Stand ===
A temporary, all-seater stand, named for Merthyr RFC president Sir Stanley Thomas. It extends approximately halfway down each side of the pitch either side of the halfway line.

=== Leisuretime Stand ===
A combination of seating and standing, this stand is located at one end of the pitch. The stand is sponsored by travel company Leisuretime.

== Additional facilities ==
The facilities at the Wern have been improved in recent years, in line with rising attendances due to Merthyr RFC's league success.

=== 3G all-weather pitch ===
The playing surface is artificial turf. This was installed in 2016 by South Wales Sports Grounds and is complete with a blue border around the main playing surface.

=== Floodlights ===
There are several tall floodlights positioned along both sides of the pitch.

=== Club shop ===
A club shop is situated in the main car park and operated by Merthyr RFC kit manufacturer, Macron.

=== Lounge/bar ===
A sponsors lounge and bar is located to one side of the Main Stand and is open during match days.

== Transport ==
The Wern is located approximately 10 minutes walk from Merthyr Tydfil bus station and Merthyr Tydfil railway station. Parking at the stadium is limited with around 50 available spaces.

== Clubhouse ==
The clubhouse is located around half a mile from the Wern, close to Merthyr Tydfil College and the town centre. There are several bars, a function room and parking facilities.
