= Iffley Road rugby football ground =

Playing-field in Oxford, England

Iffley Road
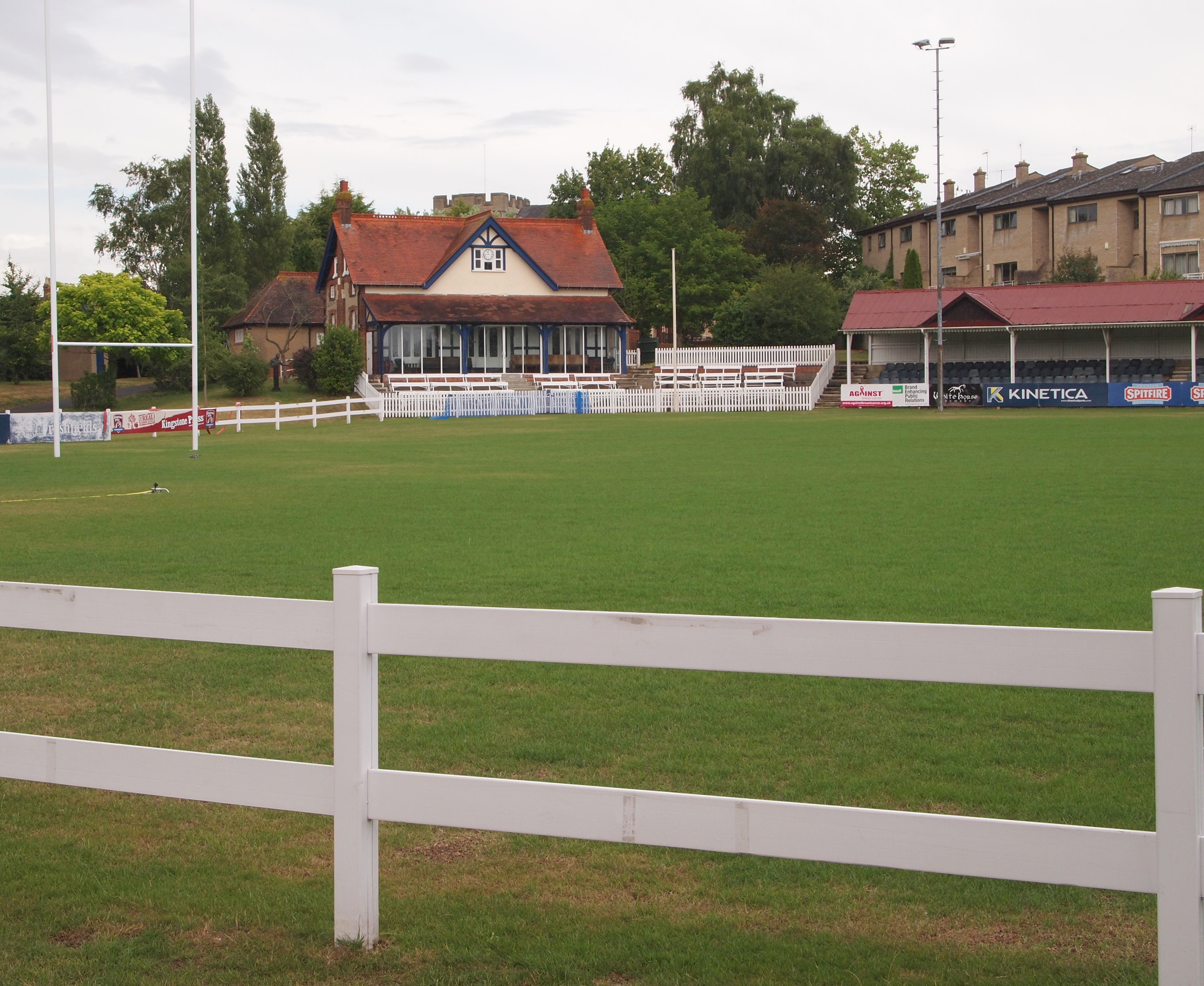
- Iffley Road Rugby Football Ground
- Interactive map of Iffley Road
- Former names: The New Football Ground
- Location: Iffley Road, Oxford, England
- Coordinates: 51.7446°N 1.2419°W
- Owner: Oxford University
- Capacity: 5,500
- Surface: Grass

Tenants
- Oxford University Rugby Football Club (1890s-); Oxford University A.F.C. (1890s-1921); Oxford Rugby League (2013-2015)

Iffley Road rugby football ground is a playing-field in Oxford, England. It is the home of Oxford University Rugby Football Club and between 2013 and 2016 was the home of semi-professional Oxford Rugby League. It is close to the Roger Bannister running track.

== History ==
The land was originally bought in 1876 and was used as a cricket ground until Oxford University Cricket Club moved to the Parks in 1881.

Oxford Union RFC bought the field from Christ Church in the 1890s for £1,000. It was called the New Football Ground, and the cricket pavilion continued to be used by the new owners. Oxford University A.F.C. shared the facilities until they moved to a neighbouring field in 1921.

== Rugby union ==
Iffley Road is the home ground of the Oxford University Rugby Football Club. Many matches against international teams have been played at Iffley Road. Oxford University has played there against South Africa six times (1906, 1912, 1931, 1951, 1960 and 1969), New Zealand 5 times (1905, 1924, 1935, 1953 and 1963) and Australia 8 times (1908, 1927, 1947, 1957, 1966, 1975, 1981 and 2001). In 2013 and 2014, the University played Russia.

Other games include Canada vs Maori All Blacks in 2012 and England under-16s vs Wales under-16s.

== Rugby league ==
Rugby league was first played at Iffley Road in 2008 when the University of Oxford played Oxford Brookes. Semi-professional rugby league arrived in 2013 when Oxford Rugby League entered Championship 1 based at Iffley Road, commemorated by the draw for the 3rd round of the 2013 Challenge Cup being held there. Oxford RL moved to Tilsley Park, Abingdon in the 2016 season, but folded a year later.
