= Tilsley Park =

Coordinates: 51.6898°N 1.2852°W

- Interactive map of Tilsley Park
- Location: Abingdon-on-Thames
- Capacity: 500

Tenants
- Oxford Saints American Football Club (2016–); Oxford Rugby League (2016–2017)

Tilsley Park is an athletics stadium in Abingdon-on-Thames, Oxfordshire, which is home to Oxford Saints American Football Club. It is managed by Abingdon School on behalf of Vale of White Horse District Council.

In 2014, Abingdon School took over the management of Tilsley Park and undertook a series of improvements which including installing a new 4G surface and refurbishing the facility's social areas.

In January 2016, Oxford Rugby League announced that it had been given approval by the Rugby Football League to relocate to Tilsley Park. On 24 April, they played their first league match at the venue against Hunslet Hawks.
