= Stebonheath Park =

Sports stadium in Llanelli, Wales

Coordinates: 51°41′02″N 4°08′51″W

- Stebo
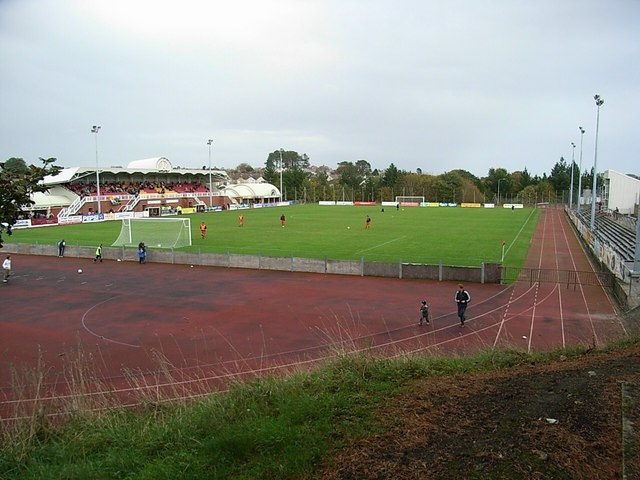
- UEFA
- Interactive map of Stebonheath Park
- Location: Evans Terrace, Llanelli, Carmarthenshire, Wales SA15 1EY
- Owner: Llanelli Town Council
- Operator: Llanelli A.F.C.
- Capacity: 3,700 (1,005 seated)
- Surface: Grass

Construction
- Renovated: 1977, 2008

Tenants
- Llanelli Town A.F.C. Llanelli AAC Raiders RL: 1922 -present 1979-present 2015-2022

Stebonheath Park (Welsh: Parc Stebonheath) is a multi-use stadium in Llanelli, West Wales with a capacity of 3,700. It is primarily used as a football ground and is the home of Llanelli Town A.F.C. It was also used for athletics and Llanelli Amateur Athletic Club (Llanelli AAC) were based at the stadium. It is owned by Llanelli Town Council. From 2015 West Wales Raiders rugby league club used the stadium for their debut season in the Conference League South and subsequent season in the RFL League 1 until the club withdrew from the league in December 2022.

== History ==
Stebonheath Park has been used as a football ground since 1920. It almost hosted League football in the 1930s but the club lost out coming second in the vote. At the time the ground had a large wooden grandstand, a covered end terrace and a large bank on the south side, and it could easily have been developed into a Third Division ground. The stand was subsequently demolished and the ground re-shaped to allow the building of an adjacent by-pass road.

Stebonheath Park was home to the Wales national rugby league team in the 1930s. Here Wales were crowned European Champions, after defeating England 17–9, on 10 November 1938. Frank Whitcombe made his debut for Wales in this game.

The stadium has been owned by Llanelli Town Council since 1977. The council undertook major redevelopments of the stadium which included floodlighting, a new 700-seater main stand, new terracing, a function room social club as well as all-weather training facilities for the athletics club. In July 2008, a new open seated stand was built on existing terracing along one side of the ground with about 300 seats.

Around the pitch is a narrow 400-metre running track with four lanes on each straight. It is the narrowest 400m track in the United Kingdom.

On 28 February 2006 the stadium hosted an international match between Wales Under-21s and Northern Ireland Under-21s, with the Northern Irish side winning 1–0.

Local junior football finals are held at the stadium. The Welsh Cup Final has been staged at the stadium including the 2002–03 season final between Barry Town and Cwmbran Town as well as the 2004–05 final between Total Network Solutions and Carmarthen Town. On 6 May 2007 Stebonheath Park staged the 120th Welsh Cup final between Carmarthen Town and Afan Lido.

On 31 October 2008 the stadium hosted a Victory Shield match between Wales under-16 and England under-16 which was shown live on Sky Sports.

In 2016 it held a 2017 Rugby League World Cup Qualifier between Wales and Serbia.

On 19 March 2024 the stadium hosted an international friendly match between Wales C and England C, with the Wales B team winning 1-0.

== Llanelli AFC ==
Although the stadium was the home of Llanelli AFC, they used to play major games at Stradey Park which had a capacity of 10,800. Stradey Park was demolished in late 2008 and an option for major games was the then newly built 14,340 capacity Parc y Scarlets.

The new open seated stand at Stebonheath Park enabled Llanelli to host European matches, the first being a UEFA Champions League qualifier against Latvian club FK Ventspils in July 2008.

== Llanelli AAC ==
Llanelli AAC, which was formed in 1978, is based at the stadium and caters for all standards of track and field athletics, cross-country running and road running.

== Raiders RL ==
West Wales Raiders RL relocated to Llanelli in 2014 and struck up a deal to play at the stadium with the local council in preparation for the debut season in the Conference league south where they finished third. The West Wales Raiders Rugby League Club previously known as Raiders RL are the most established Rugby league club[1] in West Wales formed in January 2015.[2] Formerly called Gwendreath Valley Raiders they moved to Llanelli when the club gained entry into the Conference League South which is level 4 of the Rugby League system. In 2017, Andrew Thorne purchased the semi professional League 1 club South Wales Ironmen, relocating the club immediately to Llanelli. The Ironmen will rebrand as West Wales Raiders from 2018 onwards.

They also have links with one of the oldest university rugby league teams in Wales the Warpigs from Swansea University. The raiders have taken over the running and coaching of the university rugby league team since 2017.

The Raiders first ever match was an away friendly against Aberystwyth University in February which they won 72–6. Their first league match was a home derby win against the defending champions Valley Cougars 34–6, captain Alan Pope scoring the club's first try. The game was watched by over 370 spectators.

== Records ==
The record attendance for football at Stebonheath Park is 1,410 for a Welsh Premier League football match between Llanelli and Barry Town on 14 January 2000.

The biggest ever crowd at Stebonheath Park was for a Rugby League match on 23 November 1935 where Wales beat France in front of a crowd of over 25,000 fans.
