= Queensway Stadium =

Sports stadium in Wrexham, Wales

Coordinates: 53°2′39″N 2°58′36″W

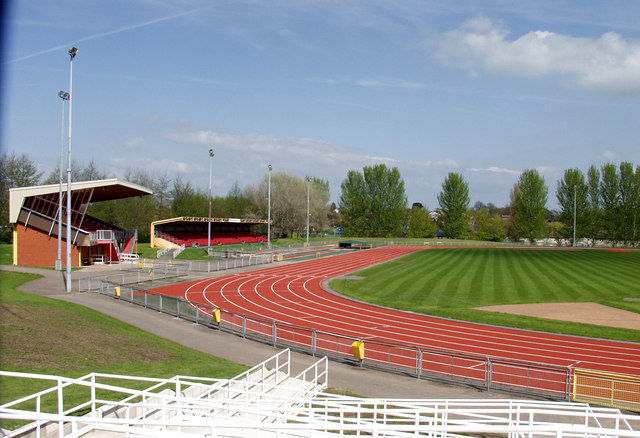
- Interactive map of Queensway Stadium
- Location: Wrexham
- Capacity: 8,256

Tenant
- North Wales Crusaders (2017-2021)

Queensway Stadium is an athletics stadium in Wrexham, Wales, which is home to the Wrexham Athletics Club and FC Queens Park football club.

North Wales Crusaders moved to the stadium from the Racecourse Ground for the 2017 rugby league season, until moving to the Eirias Stadium, Colwyn Bay in 2021.
