= Pennine Way Stadium =

Rugby stadium in Hemel Hempstead, England

- Interactive map of Pennine Way Stadium
- Full name: Pennine Way Stadium
- Location: Pennine Way, HP2 5UD, Hemel Hempstead, Hertfordshire
- Coordinates: 51°46′4.87″N 0°27′12.83″W
- Capacity: 2,000 (406 seats)
- Surface: Grass
- Record attendance: 679 v Oldham; 12 May 2013

Construction
- Groundbreaking: 1981
- Built: 2008
- Opened: 1981

Tenants
- Hemel Stags (1981-)

The Pennine Way Stadium is a multi-use sports facility in Hemel Hempstead, Hertfordshire, and home of Hemel Stags rugby league club.

== History ==
Hemel Stags were formed in 1981. Since then they have been based at the Pennine Way Stadium. Hemel Stags played their first match at Pennine Way on 3 April 1981 against Walthamstow-based McEntee, losing 38–0.

A 21-year Dacorum Borough Council lease was granted to Stags in 1985. In February 1985, Hemel Stags opened their first social club at Pennine Way. It incorporated a bar and a social/recreational area. The clubhouse doubled in size in 1987. Growing confidence in the club in the early 1990s saw the opening of a completely new social club with the old clubhouse being converted into changing rooms.

Ground difficulties meant that Hemel had to leave the Alliance league and drop down to the Rugby League Conference in 1999.

In September 2008, the club obtained planning permission for a small stadium at Pennine Way and in 2010 the first stage was completed with the enclosure of the ground and the opening of an all-weather training pitch and the floodlighting of the main pitch.

In preparation for Hemel's admittance to the semi-professional Championship 1, a 406-seat stand was built at the end of the 2012 season.
