= Kingston Park (stadium) =

Stadium in Newcastle upon Tyne

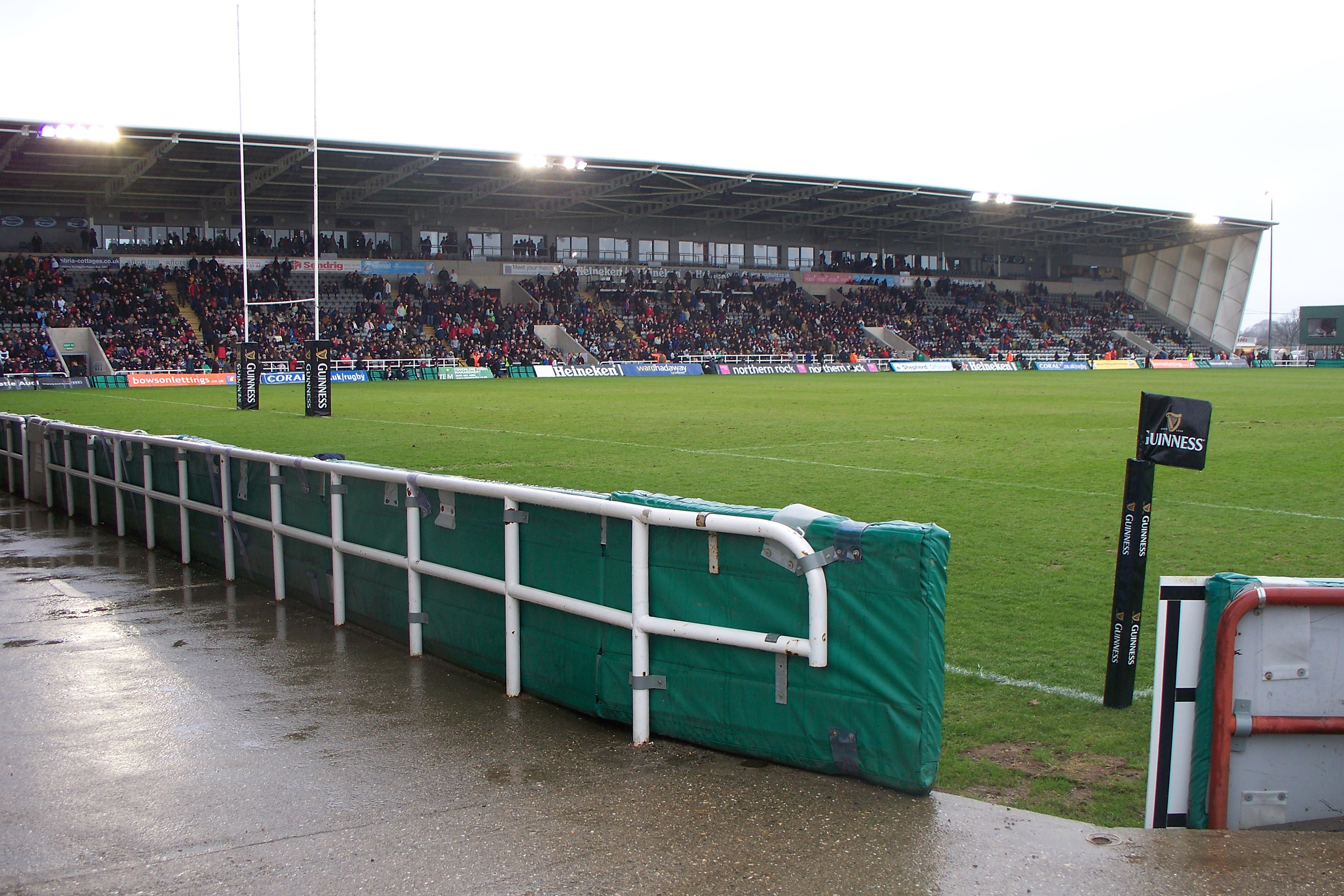
- West stand
- Interactive map of Kingston Park
- Location: Kingston Park, Newcastle upon Tyne NE13 8AF, England
- Coordinates: 55°1′7″N 1°40′20″W
- Owner: Newcastle Red Bulls
- Capacity: 10,210
- Surface: SIS - Rugger

Construction
- Opened: 1990
- Architects: TTH Architects, Gateshead, UK

Tenants
- Newcastle Red Bulls; Newcastle United Reserves; Newcastle United Women (2022–2025); Newcastle Blue Star (2007–2009); Newcastle Thunder

Kingston Park is a multi-purpose stadium in Kingston Park, Newcastle upon Tyne, England. It is used mostly for rugby union and rugby league matches and is the home stadium of Premiership Rugby side Newcastle Red Bulls. From 2007 to 2009 it was home to semi-professional football team Newcastle Blue Star, and Betfred League One Rugby League side Newcastle Thunder until 2024 and was the main home to Newcastle United Women football team from 2022 to 2025.

== The ground ==
In 1990 Newcastle Gosforth, as the Red Bulls were then known, moved into their new ground Kingston Park, which they had purchased for £55,000. Prior to Newcastle Gosforth moving in, the site had been the Newcastle Chronicle and Journal Sports Ground.

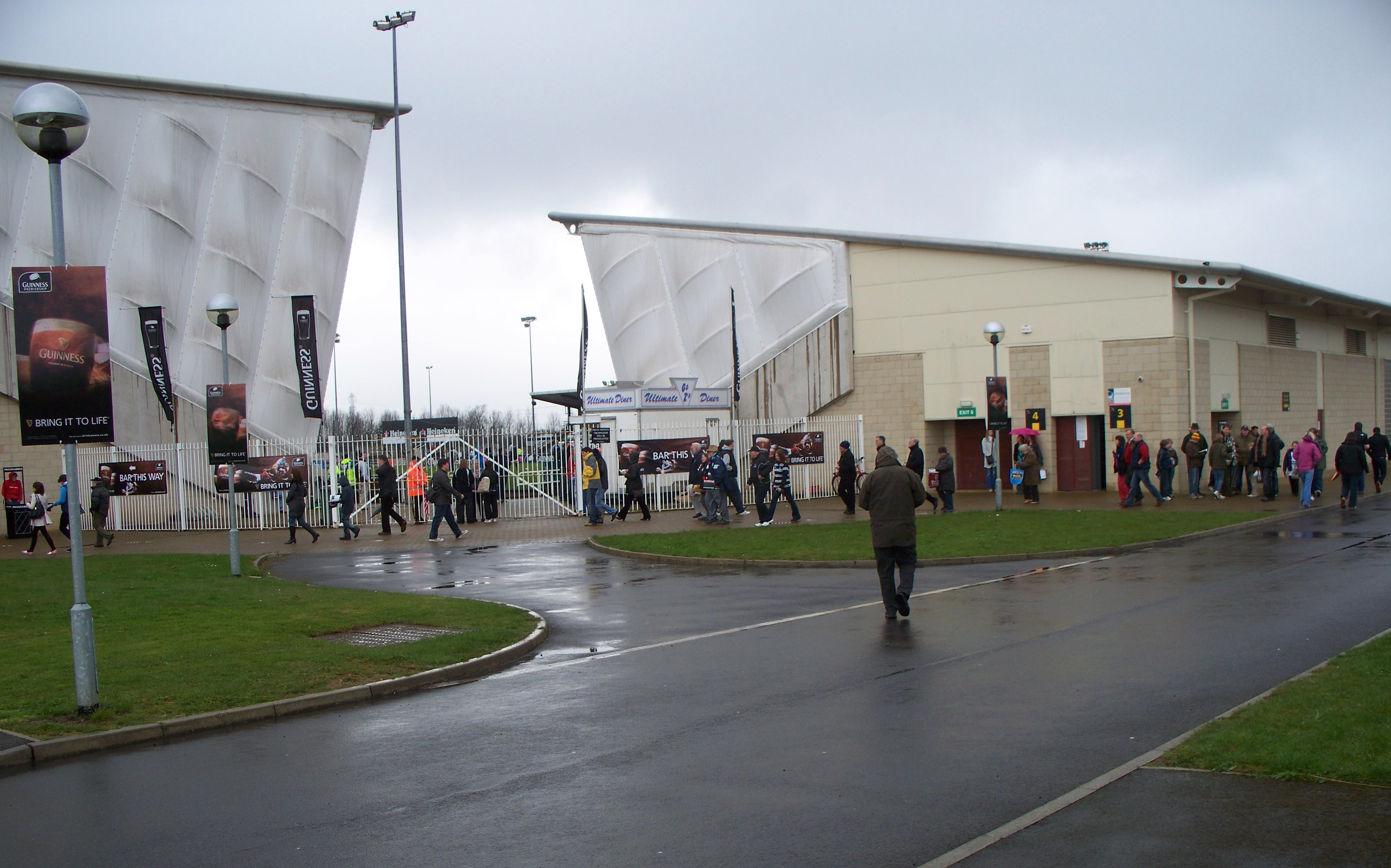
View of exterior of West and South stands

The stadium has a capacity of 10,200 people. The stadium was built in stages, with the West Stand being the newest and most modern. There are plans to expand the exposed North Stand to give more protection from the elements and to provide more facilities for the fans. The South Stand (John Smith's stand) is all standing but it has good protection from the elements and facilities for the fans underneath the stand.

Through the 2013–14 rugby and football seasons, the stadium had a grass surface. In March 2014, Premiership Rugby approved Newcastle Falcons' (the then-name of the Red Bulls) plan to install an advanced artificial pitch during the 2014 close season, and Newcastle City Council approved the plan in May. The new artificial pitch, the second in Premiership Rugby, was installed by SIS Pitches, the company responsible for the Premiership's first such pitch at Saracens' Copthall Stadium.

The nearest Tyne and Wear Metro station is the Bank Foot station.

Northumbria University and the club are to develop the UK's first ever rugby-based Centre of Sporting Excellence at Kingston Park.

== Ownership ==
Newcastle Red Bulls own the stadium, having bought the ground back in June 2015. The stadium was previously owned by Northumbria University who bought it in late 2008 for an undisclosed fee. The then-Falcons were leasing the site back from Northumbria University, in a similar fashion to the agreement with the previous owner. Included in the university deal for the 23-acre (93,000 m^{2}) site is the rugby stadium, the land around the stadium and the car park. The former owner was the Northern Rock bank, who purchased it in 2007 for £14,756,646.

== Rugby League internationals ==
On 28 August 2019, it was announced that Kingston Park would host three games of the 2021 Rugby League World Cup (now to be held in 2022). These games were originally planned to be hosted at a new stadium built in Workington but in early July 2019, Allerdale Council announced that they would be unable to host the games as the project to build a new stadium had stalled.

=== Internationals ===
Date	Winners	Score	Runners-up	Competition	Attendance
16 October 2022	Italy	28–4	Scotland	2021 Rugby League World Cup Group B	6,206
22 October 2022	Fiji	60-4	Italy	2021 Rugby League World Cup Group B	3,675
29 October 2022	Fiji	30-14	Scotland	2021 Rugby League World Cup Group B	6,736
