= Nick Newbold Stadium =

Stadium in Spon End, Coventry, England

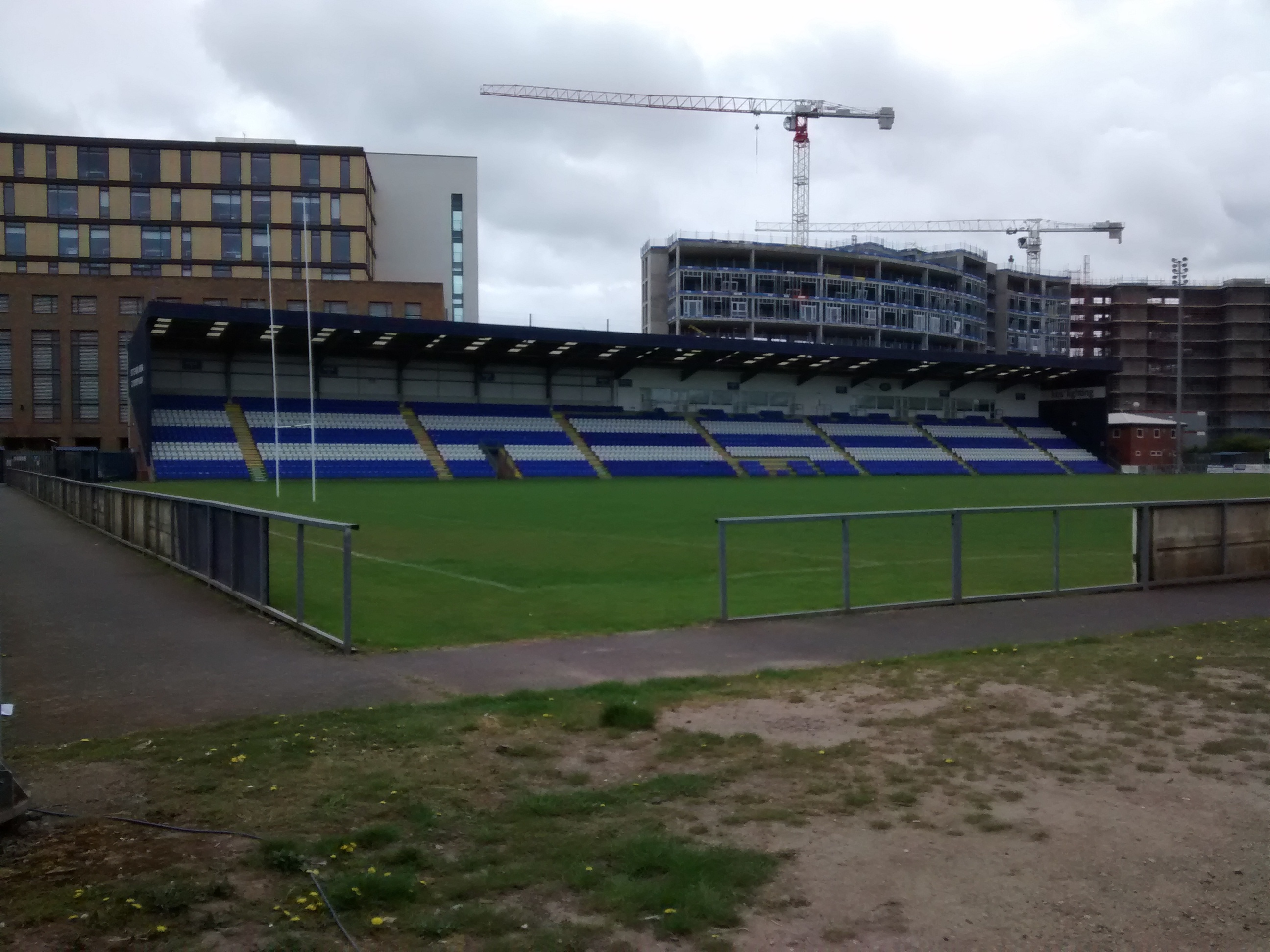
- The Main Stand
- Interactive map of Nick Newbold Stadium
- Former names: Butts Park Arena (2004-2026)
- Location: Coventry, England
- Coordinates: 52°24′22″N 1°31′33″W
- Owner: Coventry R.F.C.
- Capacity: 5,250 (3,000 seats) (4,000 seats up until 2005–06 season)
- Surface: Artificial

Construction
- Opened: 2004

Tenants
- Coventry R.F.C. Coventry Phoenix (2024–); Coventry Bears R.L.F.C (2004–2021); Coventry United F.C. Coventry United L.F.C. (2015–2023); Coventry Jets (2005–2010)

Nick Newbold Stadium, formerly known as Butts Park Arena, is a multi-use sports stadium in Spon End, Coventry, England that opened in 2004. Its main use is as a rugby stadium (both union and league). It is the home ground for Coventry R.F.C., a rugby union team (since its opening) and was the home of Midlands Hurricanes, a rugby league team (who played there as Coventry Bears from its opening until the 2021-22 season ended). It was also formerly the home ground of the Coventry Jets, an American football team. From the 2017–18 season, the stadium is also the home of Coventry United, a non-league football club and their Ladies team who play in the second tier FA Women's Championship.

The stadium has also hosted the local varsity day matches between Coventry University and the University of Warwick.

== The stadium ==
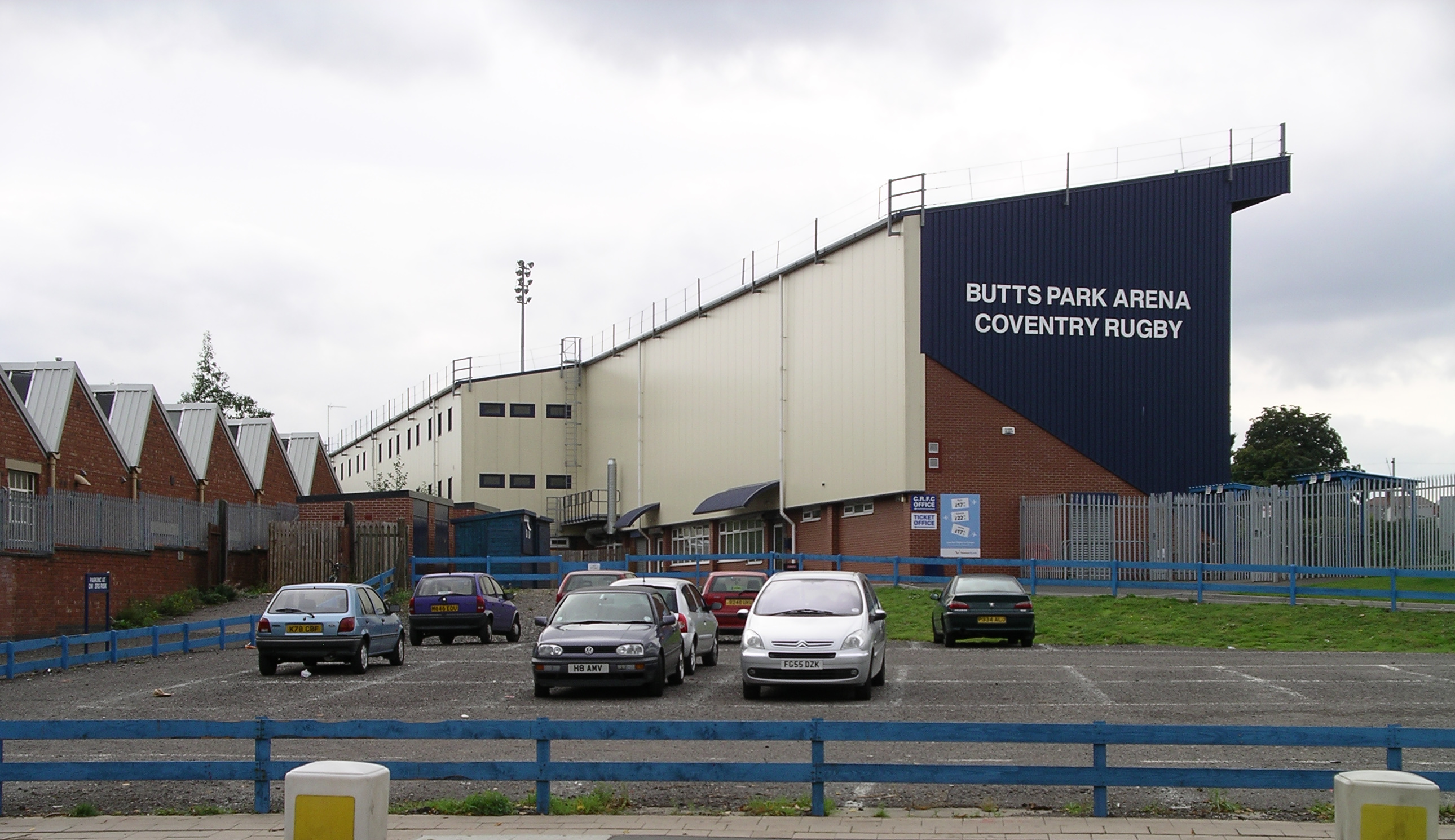
View of the main stand from the road.

The stadium, originally named Butts Park Arena, was built in 2004 and currently has one stand, known for sponsorship reasons as the XL Motors stand, which has a capacity of 3,000 and includes a number of conference and banqueting facilities. The West Stand which was a temporary structure holding 1,000 was removed at the end of the 2005–06 season on grounds of health and safety. There is also standing space for up to 1,000 supporters around the pitch. It is on the site of the Butts cycling track.

In June 2019, the pitch was replaced with an artificial playing surface.

On 17 September 2023, the 35th annual Britbowl, the championship game of the BAFA National League tournament, happened at the park between the Manchester Titans and the London Warriors. The Manchester Titans won the game 44–27.

On 21 February 2026, it was announced that the stadium would be renamed as the Nick Newbold Stadium ahead of a home game against Hartpury, in honour of Nick Newbold, who worked at the stadium for 17 years, for his contributions to the club and the wider community, including raising money for Acorns Children's Hospice. A formal ceremony will take place on 21 March 2026, where a blue plaque will be unveiled, and is due to be attended by former England players and other celebrities who worked with him through his charity work.

== Records ==
The highest recorded attendance for a league match at Butts Park Arena is 5,047, achieved during an RFU Championship game between Coventry R.F.C. and Nottingham R.F.C. on 26 December 2023. The overall record attendance at the venue is 5,250, set during a Premiership Rugby Cup match between Coventry R.F.C. and Leicester Tigers on 15 February 2025.

Previously the club had achieved a National League 1 league record attendance of 3,758 between Coventry R.F.C. and Hull Ionians, on 28 April 2018.
