= Cougar Park =

Rugby league stadium in Keighley, England

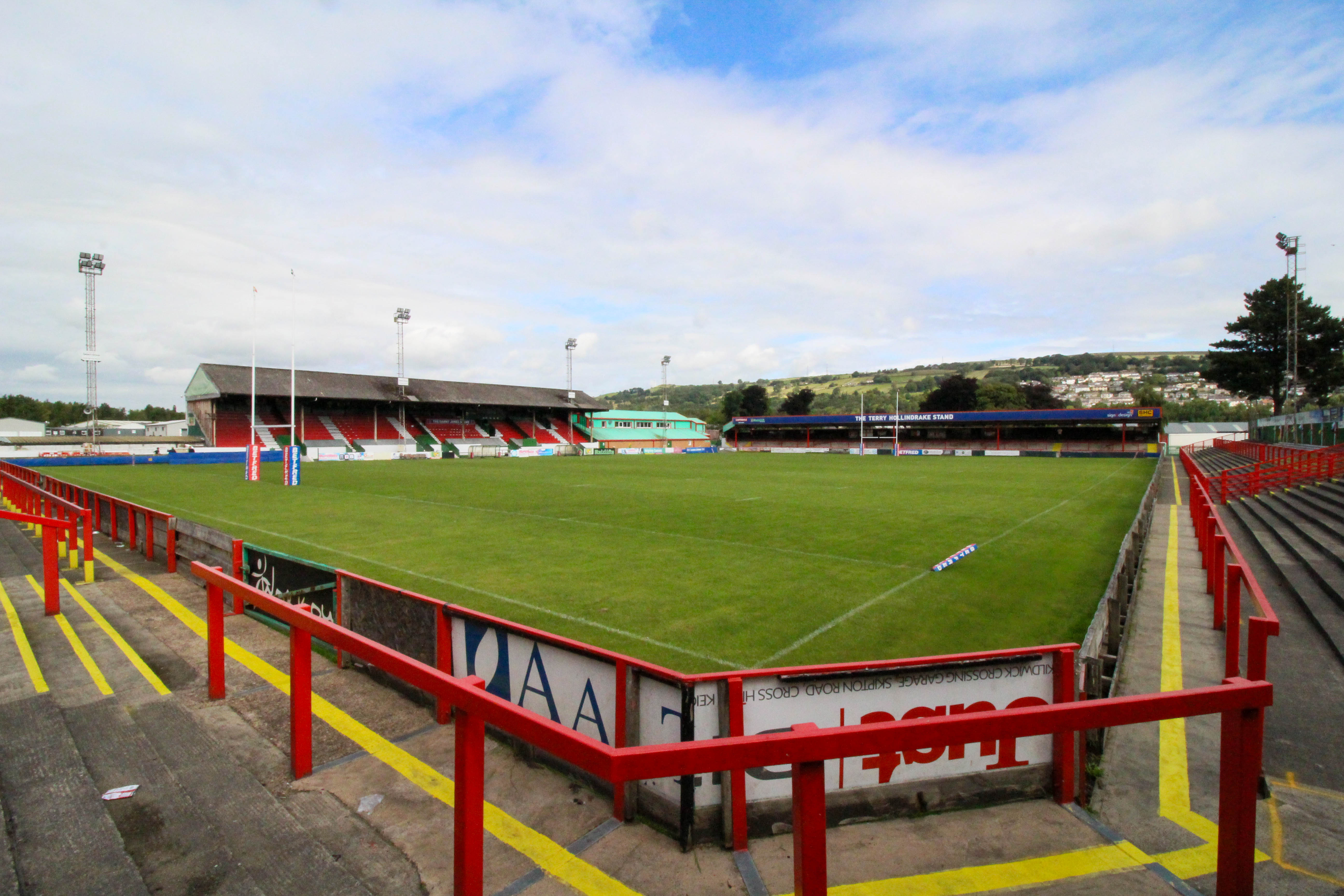
- Cougar Park in 2023
- Interactive map of Cougar Park
- Full name: Cougar Park
- Former names: Lawkholme Lane (1899–1995)
- Location: Keighley, West Yorkshire
- Coordinates: 53°52′31″N 1°54′9″W
- Owner: Keighley Cougars
- Operator: Keighley Cougars
- Capacity: 7,800
- Surface: Grass

Construction
- Built: 1876
- Opened: 1876

Tenants
- Rugby league Keighley Cougars (1899–); Football; Silsden F.C. (2003–2010); Steeton A.F.C. (2018–2019); Keighley Town F.C. (2025–)

Cougar Park is a rugby league stadium in Keighley, England, which is the home stadium of the Keighley Cougars. Its capacity is 7,800 people. It also hosted a match during the 1995 Rugby League World Cup. From 1899 until 1995, it was known as "Lawkholme Lane". Football is also played at the ground, Silsden F.C. had played their home matches at the venue between 2003 and 2010. and Steeton A.F.C. played at the ground in 2018 and 2019. In 2025 Ryan O'Neil and Kaue Garcia, the owners of the Cougars, purchased Keighley Town (then called Eccleshill United) and moved the football club from Wrose in Bradford to Cougar Park.

== History ==
Keighley Rugby Football Club was formed on 17 October 1876 and was allowed the use of a field in Lawkholme Lane. On 18 November 1876, the first game took place at Lawkholme Lane.

In 1932, with attendances on the rise the directors launched a big scheme of ground improvements. Up to this point Lawkholme Lane had had uncovered terraces and only one open stand on the Stockbridge side of the ground.

The playing area was widened; the turf and appointments were improved, and a spacious covered stand was erected. The new stand and improvements were opened on 9 September 1933 when Leeds were the visitors to Lawkholme Lane.

When Warrington visited Lawkholme Lane in the Challenge Cup there was a crowd of 14,000 who paid £761, then record receipts for the ground.

A fund was launched for the erection of a new stand, new dressing rooms, and other ground improvements. Local tradesmen were approached, collections were taken at matches and the supporters club arranged money-raising efforts. More than £3,000 was donated in the first season.

In 1957, the Keighley board bought Lawkholme Lane football ground, cricket ground, bowling green and cottages 13 acres (53,000 m^{2}) of land in total, from the Duke of Devonshire for £10,000 paid for in sums of £2,500 a year. When the Hard Ings Road by-pass was built Keighley recouped some of their money by selling off a piece of land where cottages had been, for the erection of a petrol station.

In October 1985 Keighley were served a winding-up order by the Inland Revenue. This was only averted by the sale of the cricket field to Keighley Cricket Club for a reported £30,000 and the training pitch to Yorkshire Water for £65,000. Lawkholme Lane was sold in the late 1980s to the Co-op for approximately £10,000 and leased back to the club.

In August 1991, "the Cougars" were officially launched. The renovation of the old Lawkholme Lane ground followed and with this came a new name for the old ground "Cougar Park".

On 8 October 1995, Fiji beat South Africa 52–6 at Cougar Park in the 1995 Rugby League World Cup.

In the 2000 Emerging Nations Tournament, on 15 November Canada lost 6–66 to Italy in a match held at Cougar Park.

The North Terrace was renamed the "Terry Hollindrake Stand" in April 2015 after former Keighley player Terry Hollindrake who died earlier in the year.

On 31 May 2015, the club named the main stand at Cougar Park the "Danny Jones Stand", after player Danny Jones who died during a game vs London Skolars on 3 May 2015.

== Layout ==
=== Terry Hollindrake Stand ===
Capacity- (standing)
The Terry Hollindrake Stand is situated at the north end of the ground behind the goal posts. It is the only covered terracing in the ground.

=== East Stand ===
Capacity- (standing)
The East Stand is open terracing that runs along the side of the pitch. Previously covered this stand has been an open terrace since before the ground was renamed Cougar Park.

=== South Stand ===
Capacity- (standing)
The South Stand is located behind the goal posts and is completely open terracing, it is identical to the East Stand. It is often referred to as the Hard Ings Road End.

=== Danny Jones Stand ===
Capacity- (seating)
The West Stand was renamed after Danny Jones who died during a Keighley game in London in 2015. The stand was renamed in his honour. The stand also backs onto Keighley cricket ground and is the only seated stand in the stadium. It houses the player changing rooms.

== Representative, tour and test matches ==
Cougar Park has been the venue for two international matches.

| Game | Date | Result | Attendance | Notes |
|---|---|---|---|---|
| 1 | 8 October 1995 | Fiji def. South Africa 52–6 | 4,845 | 1995 Rugby League World Cup Group A |
| 2 | 15 November 2000 | Italy def. Canada 66–6 | 1,028 | 2000 Rugby League Emerging Nations Tournament |

Keighley played host to various international touring teams from 1907 to 1952.

| Game | Date | Result | Attendance | Notes |
|---|---|---|---|---|
| 1 | 5 November 1907 | New Zealand def. Keighley 9–7 | 8,000 | 1907–08 All Golds tour |
| 2 | 26 January 1909 | Keighley drew with Australia 8–8 | 1,000 | 1908–09 Kangaroo tour |
| 3 | 20 September 1921 | Australasia def. Keighley 29–0 | 5,500 | 1921–22 Kangaroo tour |
| 4 | 1 October 1929 | Australia def. Keighley 15–9 | 3,000 | 1929–30 Kangaroo tour |
| 5 | 14 November 1933 | Australia def. Keighley 14–7 | 3,800 | 1933–34 Kangaroo tour |
| 6 | 6 September 1952 | Australia def. Keighley 54–4 | 7,431 | 1952–53 Kangaroo tour |

On 15 September 1934 the ground was the venue for a representative game between Yorkshire and Sports Athletic Villeneuvois XIII (the first French team to tour England, rugby league in France only having become established in May 1934), Yorkshire won 26–17 in front of a crowd of 4,000.
