= White Hart Lane Community Sports Centre =

Sporting venue in England

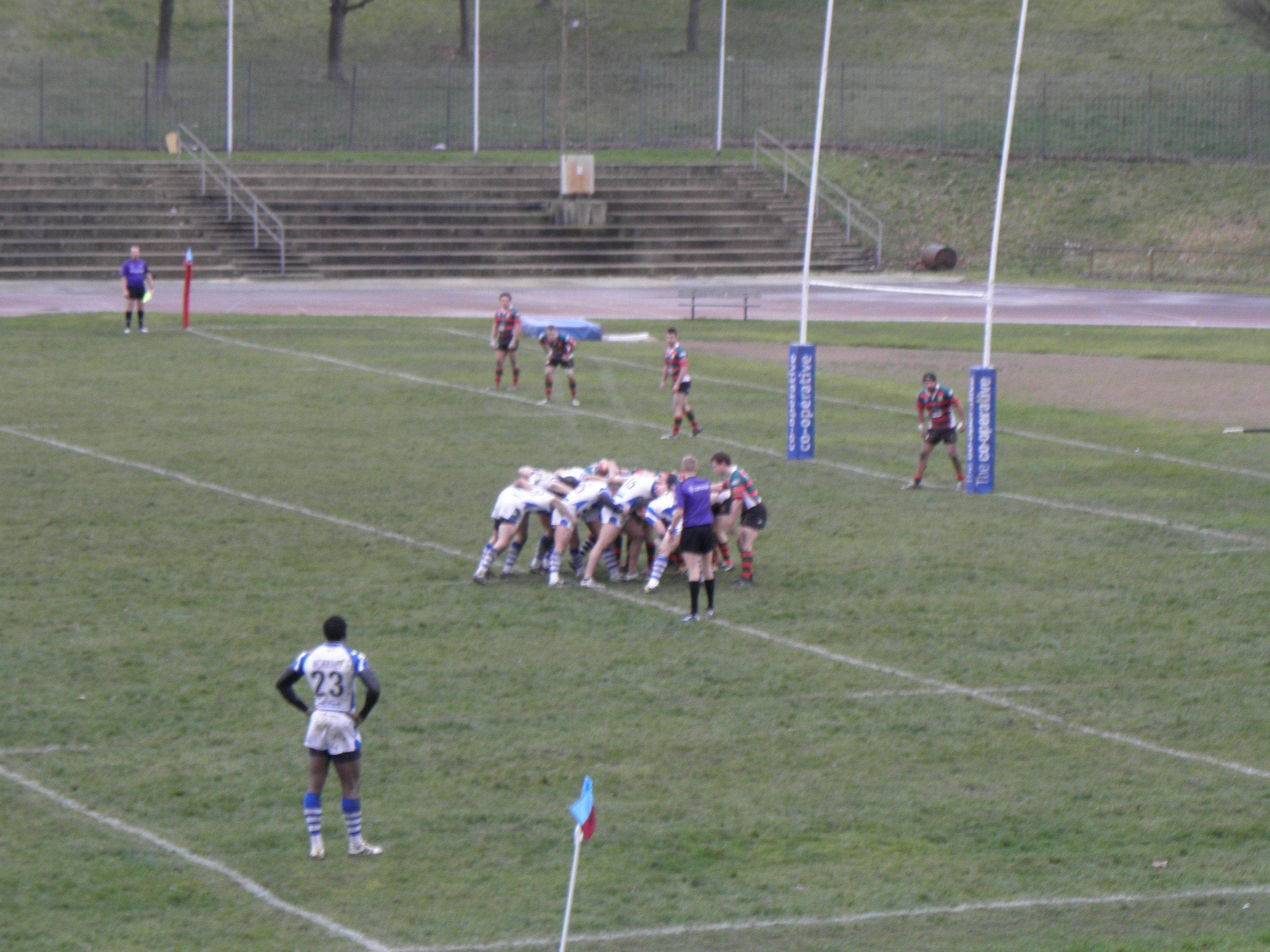
- London Skolars match
- Interactive map of White Hart Lane; Community Sports Centre
- Full name: White Hart Lane Community Sports Centre
- Former names: New River Stadium
- Location: Wood Green; London, N22; United Kingdom
- Coordinates: 51°36′18″N 0°6′2″W
- Capacity: 5,000
- Public transit: Wood Green

Tenants
- London Skolars (1995-); Enfield and Haringey Athletic Club; Wood Green Weightlifting Club; Haringey Rhinos; Haringey Cycling Club; AS London F.C.

White Hart Lane Community Sports Centre, also known as the New River Stadium, is a multi-purpose rugby league and athletics stadium in Wood Green, Haringey, north London, England that is home to London Skolars rugby league club, Enfield and Haringey Athletic Club, Wood Green Weightlifting Club, AS London F.C., Haringey Rhinos rugby union club and Haringey Cycling Club.

The stadium has hosted the Britbowl, the championship game of British American football, in 2019 and 2022.

The New River Stadium also hosts the Middlesex 9s rugby league nines tournament. The stadium is within walking distance of Tottenham Hotspur Stadium. The grandstand at the ground holds approximately 1,000 people, while the ground itself has a capacity of 5,000.

== Transport ==
Wood Green tube station on the Piccadilly line is the closest station to the stadium which is roughly a 15 minutes walk away. Also Alexandra Palace is a 30 minutes walk away which serves trains to both King's Cross St Pancras and Moorgate. White Hart Lane railway station is also around a 25-minute walk away which serves trains to Liverpool Street.
