= 2019 Toronto Wolfpack season =

- Championship Rank: 1st
- Play-off result: Winners (Promoted)
- 2019 record: Wins: 28; draws: 0; losses: 1
- Points scored: For: 1074; against: 386

Team information
- CEO: (Canada) Eric Perez
- Head Coach: (England) Brian McDermott
- Captain: (Australia) Josh McCrone
- Stadium: Lamport Stadium
- Avg. attendance: 7,882
- Agg. attendance: 94,580
- High attendance: 9,974 (vs. Featherstone Rovers)

Top scorers
- Tries: (Scotland) Matty Russell (27)
- Goals: (England) Gareth O'Brien (99)
- Points: (England) Gareth O'Brien (278)
← 2018	List of seasons	2020 →

This article details the Toronto Wolfpack's rugby league football club's 2019 season. This is the Wolfpack's third season overall and second season in the RFL Championship.

== Competitions ==
Win Draw Loss

=== Pre-season friendlies ===
Date	Home	Score	Away	Venue	Tries	Goals	Attendance
19 January	Hull Kingston Rovers	24-14	Toronto Wolfpack	Craven Park	O'Brien, Thompson, Wheeler	O'Brien 1/3	
26 January	Bradford Bulls	12-48	Toronto Wolfpack	Odsal Stadium	Ackers (2), Wallace (2), Dixon, Higson, Mellor, O'Brien, Wheeler	O'Brien 4/6, Wallace 2/3	

=== Championship ===
==== Table ====
Pos	Team	Pld	W	D	L	PF	PA	PD	Pts	Qualification
1	Toronto Wolfpack	27	26	0	1	1010	356	+654	52	Play-off semi-final
2	Toulouse Olympique	27	20	0	7	877	446	+431	40	Play-off qualifying final
3	York City Knights	27	19	1	7	612	529	+83	39	Play-off qualifying final
4	Leigh Centurions	27	18	0	9	792	558	+234	36	Play-off elimination final
5	Featherstone Rovers	27	17	0	10	837	471	+366	34	Play-off elimination final
6	Bradford Bulls	27	16	1	10	717	522	+195	33	
7	Sheffield Eagles	27	15	0	12	748	694	+54	30	
8	Halifax	27	10	1	16	602	685	−83	21	
9	Swinton Lions	27	10	1	16	619	803	−184	21	
10	Batley Bulldogs	27	8	1	18	462	756	−294	17	
11	Widnes Vikings	27	14	0	13	646	586	+60	16 (Note: Widnes deducted 12 points for going into administration.)	
12	Dewsbury Rams	27	6	2	19	513	721	−208	14	
13	Barrow Raiders	27	5	1	21	479	861	−382	11	Relegated to League 1
14	Rochdale Hornets	27	1	0	26	342	1268	−926	2	Relegated to League 1

==== Results ====
Date	Rnd	Home	Score	Away	Venue	Tries	Goals	Attendance
3 February	1	York City Knights	0-14	Toronto Wolfpack	Bootham Crescent	Mellor, Russell, Wheeler	O’Brien 1/3	2,518
10 February	2	Rochdale Hornets	6-58	Toronto Wolfpack	Crown Oil Arena	Russell (4), Emmitt, Leutele, Lussick, Mellor, O’Brien, Sidlow, Stanley	O’Brien 7/11	694
16 February	3	Toronto Wolfpack	30-6	Widnes Vikings	Kingston Park Stadium	Ackers (2), Leutele, Wallace, Wheeler	O’Brien 5/6	1,817
24 February	4	Leigh Centurions	8-14	Toronto Wolfpack	Leigh Sports Village	Higson, Thompson, Wallace	O’Brien 1/3	3,142
3 March	5	Dewsbury Rams	17-22	Toronto Wolfpack	Crown Flatt	Brierley, Higson, O’Brien, Wallace	O’Brien 3/4	1,251
9 March	6	Toulouse Olympique	46-16	Toronto Wolfpack	Stade Ernest-Argelès	Beswick, Leutele, Wallace	O’Brien 2/3	6,103
17 March	7	Toronto Wolfpack	34-12	Batley Bulldogs	Craven Park	Leutele (2), Russell (2), Dixon, Logan, Wilkin	O’Brien 2/6, Brierley 1/1	7,203 (Note: Aggregate number of visitors at the double header with Hull FC – Catalans Dragons opening game)
24 March	8	Halifax	12-48	Toronto Wolfpack	The Shay	Dixon (3), Russell (2), Wallace (2), Rawsthorne, Wilkin	O’Brien 6/9	2,090
6 April	9	Toronto Wolfpack	40-10	Sheffield Eagles	New River Stadium	Russell (2), Wallace (2), Ackers, Olbison, Sidlow, Stanley	O'Brien 1/4, Wallace 3/4	1,148
19 April	10	Barrow Raiders	26-52	Toronto Wolfpack	Craven Park	O'Brien (3), Wallace (3), Ackers, Dixon, Russell	Wallace 8/9	1,417
22 April	11	Featherstone Rovers	14-23	Toronto Wolfpack	Post Office Road	Russell (3), Dixon, O’Brien	Wallace 1/5, McCrone DG	2,101
28 April	12	Toronto Wolfpack	52-10	Swinton Lions	Lamport Stadium	Wallace (2), Ackers, Dixon, Higson, Leutele, O'Brien, Olbison, Thompson	Wallace 8/10	9,562
4 May	13	Toronto Wolfpack	36-16	Bradford Bulls	Lamport Stadium	Rawsthorne (2), Kay, Leutele, O'Brien, Sidlow, Stanley	O'Brien 4/7	8,363
18 May	14	Toulouse Olympique	14-42	Toronto Wolfpack	Bloomfield Road	Stanley (3), Lussick, McCrone, O'Brien, Rawsthorne	O'Brien 7/8	7,912
24 May	15	Sheffield Eagles	16-42	Toronto Wolfpack	Olympic Legacy Park	Dixon (2), Ackers, Kay, Leutele, Rawsthorne, Stanley, Wallace	Wallace 5/8	932
9 June	16	Swinton Lions	14-34	Toronto Wolfpack	Heywood Road	Leutele (2), Beswick, Dixon, Sidlow, Stanley	Wallace 5/6	1,281
15 June	17	Toronto Wolfpack	70-8	Dewsbury Rams	Lamport Stadium	Kay (2), Mullally (2), Russell (2), Ackers, Beswick, Mellor, O'Brien, Sidlow, Wallace	O'Brien 11/12	6,735
22 June	18	Toronto Wolfpack	28-16	Toulouse Olympique	Lamport Stadium	Worthington (2), Ackers, Russell	O'Brien 6/7	7,742
30 June	19	Batley Bulldogs	10-40	Toronto Wolfpack	The Fox's Biscuits Stadium	Ackers (2), Leutele (2), Russell (2), O'Brien	O'Brien 5/5, Wallace 1/1, Miloudi 0/1	894
6 July	20	Toronto Wolfpack	34-12	Halifax	Lamport Stadium	O'Brien (2), Ackers, Kay, Olbison	O'Brien 5/6	6,749
13 July	21	Toronto Wolfpack	22-18	Featherstone Rovers	Lamport Stadium	Leutele, McCrone, O'Brien, Stanley	O'Brien 3/4, Rawsthorne 0/1	7,819
21 July	22	Widnes Vikings	19-24	Toronto Wolfpack	Halton Stadium	Lussick, Mullally, Rawsthorne, Stanley, Thompson	McCrone 1/4, Miloudi 1/1	3,813
4 August	23	Bradford Bulls	20-25	Toronto Wolfpack	Odsal Stadium	Leutele (2), Rawsthorne (2), Kay	Wallace 1/3, Miloudi 1/2, Miloudi DG	3,121
10 August	24	Toronto Wolfpack	56-6	York City Knights	Lamport Stadium	O’Brien (3), Ackers (2), McCrone (2), Miloudi (2), Dixon, Rawsthorne, Russell	O’Brien 5/10, Wallace 1/1	7,261
17 August	25	Toronto Wolfpack	46-0	Rochdale Hornets	Lamport Stadium	Russell (3), O’Brien (2), Stanley (2), Miloudi, Olbison	O’Brien 3/7, Miloudi 2/3	5,769
31 August	26	Toronto Wolfpack	62-8	Barrow Raiders	Lamport Stadium	Kay (3), Dixon (2), Russell (2), Ackers, McCrone, Mellor, Mullally	O’Brien 9/11	7,129
7 September	27	Toronto Wolfpack	46-12	Leigh Centurions	Lamport Stadium	McCrone (2), Beswick, Kay, Mellor, Miloudi, O’Brien, Russell	O’Brien 7/8	8,152

==== Play-offs ====
Date	Game	Home	Score	Away	Venue	Tries	Goals	Attendance
22 September	Semi-final	Toronto Wolfpack	40-24	Toulouse Olympique	Lamport Stadium	Leutele (3), Mellor (2), Kay, McCrone, Stanley	O’Brien 4/8	9,325
5 October	Grand Final	Toronto Wolfpack	24-6	Featherstone Rovers	Lamport Stadium	McCrone, Mellor, Thompson, Wallace	O’Brien 2/3, Wallace 2/2	9,974

== Squad statistics ==
As of 5 October

No	Player	Position	Age	Apps	Tries	Goals	DG	Points
1	Gareth O'Brien	Fullback	27	27	20	99	0	278
2	Matty Russell	Wing	25	21	27	0	0	108
3	Chase Stanley	Centre	29	17	13	0	0	52
4	Ricky Leutele	Centre	28	28	18	0	0	72
5	Liam Kay	Wing	28	16	11	0	0	44
6	Joe Mellor	Halfback	28	21	8	0	0	32
7	Josh McCrone	Scrum-half	31	28	9	1	1	39
8	Adam Sidlow	Prop	32	17	5	0	0	20
9	Bob Beswick	Hooker	35	17	4	0	0	16
10	Ashton Sims	Prop	34	23	0	0	0	0
11	Andrew Dixon	Second-row	29	29	13	0	0	52
12	Bodene Thompson	Second-row	30	21	4	0	0	16
13	Jon Wilkin	Loose forward	35	27	2	0	0	8
14	Andy Ackers	Hooker	26	29	14	0	0	56
15	Darcy Lussick	Prop	29	25	3	0	0	12
16	Tom Olbison	Second-row	27	29	4	0	0	16
17	Blake Wallace	Stand-off	27	23	16	35	0	134
18	Gadwin Springer	Prop	25	18	0	0	0	0
19	Gary Wheeler	Wing	28	3	2	0	0	8
20	Adam Higson	Wing	31	7	3	0	0	12
21	Anthony Mullally	Prop	27	24	4	0	0	16
22	Greg Worthington	Centre	28	9	2	0	0	8
23	Ryan Brierley	Stand-off	26	5	1	1	0	6
24	Nick Rawsthorne	Centre	23	14	9	0	0	36
25	Jack Logan	Centre	23	3	1	0	0	4
26	Brad Fash	Lock	23	2	0	0	0	0
27	Hakim Miloudi	Wing	26	10	4	4	1	25
29	Jacob Emmitt	Prop	31	2	1	0	0	4
33	Olsi Krasniqi	Prop	27	1	0	0	0	0

=== Transfers ===
==== In ====
Nat	Name	Position	Signed from	Date
(Australia)	Ricky Leutele	Centre	Cronulla-Sutherland Sharks	May 2018
(England)	Jon Wilkin	Second row	St. Helens	October 2018
(England)	Joe Mellor	Scrum half	Widnes Vikings	October 2018
(New Zealand)	Bodene Thompson	Second row	Warrington Wolves	October 2018
(England)	Tom Olbison	Second row	Widnes Vikings	October 2018
(France)	Gadwin Springer	Prop	Castleford Tigers	October 2018
(England)	Anthony Mullally	Prop	Leeds Rhinos	February 2019
(England)	Jack Logan	Centre	Hull F.C. (Loan)	March 2019
(England)	Brad Fash	Second row	Hull F.C. (Loan)	March 2019
(France)	Hakim Miloudi	Wing	Hull F.C.	April 2019

==== Out ====
Nat	Name	Position	Club signed	Date
(England)	Jack Bussey	Loose forward	Featherstone Rovers	September 2018
(Australia)	Cory Paterson	Second row	Retirement	October 2018
(England)	Richard Whiting	Centre	Retirement	October 2018
(Canada)	Quinn Ngawati	Stand off	Released	October 2018
(England)	Jonny Pownall	Wing	Leigh Centurions	November 2018
(England)	James Laithwaite	Second row	Retirement	November 2018
(United States)	Ryan Burroughs	Wing	Released	November 2018
(Wales)	Sam Hopkins	Prop	Workington Town	December 2018
(Australia)	Jack Buchanan	Prop	Burleigh Bears	January 2019
(Albania)	Olsi Krasniqi	Prop	London Broncos	May 2019
(England)	Jacob Emmitt	Prop	Leigh Centurions	March 2019
(England)	Nick Rawsthorne	Centre	York City Knights (Loan)	April 2019
(England)	Mason Caton-Brown	Wing	Wakefield Trinity	April 2019
(England)	Ryan Brierley	Stand off	Leigh Centurions (Loan)	April 2019
(England)	Adam Higson	Wing	Leigh Centurions	June 2019

== Milestones ==
Former Leeds Rhinos coach Brian McDermott has been named new Toronto Wolfpack head coach.

- Round 1: Ricky Leutele, Joe Mellor, Bodene Thompson, Jon Wilkin, Tom Olbison and Gadwin Springer made their debuts for the Wolfpack.
- Round 1: Joe Mellor scored his 1st try for the Wolfpack.
- Round 2: Jacob Emmitt made his 50th appearance for the Wolfpack.
- Round 2: Matty Russell scored his 1st four-try haul and 1st hat-trick for the Wolfpack.
- Round 2: Ricky Leutele scored his 1st try for the Wolfpack.
- Round 2: Gareth O'Brien reached 200 points for the Wolfpack.
- Round 4: Anthony Mullally made his debut for the Wolfpack.
- Round 4: Bodene Thompson scored his 1st try for the Wolfpack.
- Round 5: Bob Beswick made his 50th appearance for the Wolfpack.
- Round 6: Jack Logan made his debut for the Wolfpack.
- Round 6: Blake Wallace made his 50th appearance for the Wolfpack.
- Round 7: Brad Fash made his debut for the Wolfpack.
- Round 7: Jack Logan and Jon Wilkin scored their 1st try for the Wolfpack.
- Round 8: Andrew Dixon scored his 1st hat-trick for the Wolfpack.
- Round 9: Andrew Dixon made his 50th appearance for the Wolfpack.
- Round 9: Hakim Miloudi made his debut for the Wolfpack.
- Round 9: Tom Olbison scored his 1st try for the Wolfpack.
- Round 9: Blake Wallace kicked his 1st goal for the Wolfpack.
- Round 10: Gareth O'Brien scored his 2nd hat-trick for the Wolfpack.
- Round 10: Blake Wallace scored his 5th hat-trick for the Wolfpack.
- Round 10: Blake Wallace reached 200 points for the Wolfpack.
- Round 11: Matty Russell scored his 2nd hat-trick for the Wolfpack.
- Round 11: Josh McCrone kicked his 1st drop goal for the Wolfpack.

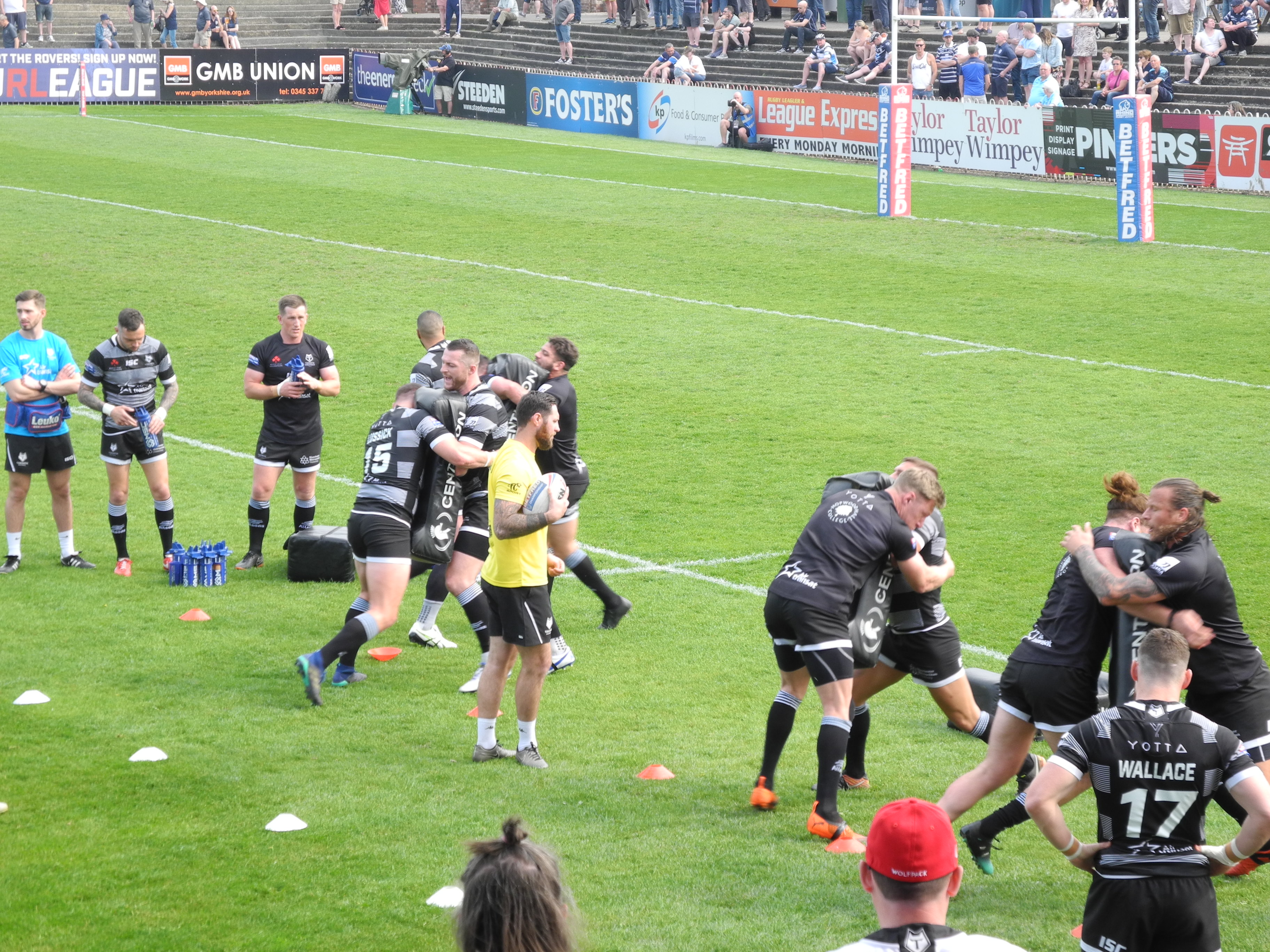
The Wolfpack warming up for the round 11 match against Featherstone in April 2019

- Round 13: Gareth O'Brien kicked his 100th goal for the Wolfpack.
- Round 14: Chase Stanley scored his 1st hat-trick for the Wolfpack.
- Round 14: Gareth O'Brien reached 300 points for the Wolfpack.
- Round 15: Liam Kay made his 50th appearance for the Wolfpack.
- Round 16: Andrew Dixon scored his 25th try and reached 100 points for the Wolfpack.
- Round 17: Anthony Mullally scored his 1st try for the Wolfpack.
- Round 17: Matty Russell scored his 25th try and reached 100 points for the Wolfpack.
- Round 19: Andy Ackers made his 50th appearance for the Wolfpack.
- Round 20: Josh McCrone made his 50th appearance for the Wolfpack.
- Round 20: Gareth O'Brien scored his 25th try for the Wolfpack.
- Round 22: Josh McCrone and Hakim Miloudi kicked their 1st goal for the Wolfpack.
- Round 23: Greg Worthington made his 50th appearance for the Wolfpack.
- Round 23: Hakim Miloudi kicked his 1st drop goal for the Wolfpack.
- Round 23: Nick Rawsthorne scored his 25th try and reached 100 points for the Wolfpack.
- Round 24: Gareth O'Brien scored his 3rd hat-trick for the Wolfpack.
- Round 24: Andy Ackers scored his 25th try and reached 100 points for the Wolfpack.
- Round 24: Hakim Miloudi scored his 1st try for the Wolfpack.
- Round 24: Gareth O'Brien reached 400 points for the Wolfpack.
- Round 25: Matty Russell scored his 3rd hat-trick for the Wolfpack.
- Round 26: Liam Kay scored his 8th hat-trick for the Wolfpack.
- Semi Final: Gareth O'Brien made his 50th appearance for the Wolfpack.
- Semi Final: Ricky Leutele scored his 1st hat-trick for the Wolfpack.
- Final: Ashton Sims made his 50th appearance for the Wolfpack.
- Final: Blake Wallace scored his 50th try for the Wolfpack.
