= 2020 Toronto Wolfpack season =

- Super League XXV Rank: withdrew
- Challenge Cup: 6th round
- 2020 record: Wins: 1; draws: 0; losses: 6
- Points scored: For: 88; against: 214

Team information
- CEO: (Canada) Bob Hunter
- Head Coach: (England) Brian McDermott
- Captain: (Australia) Josh McCrone
- Stadium: Lamport Stadium

Top scorers
- Tries: (Scotland) Matty Russell (Australia) Ricky Leutele (England) Gary Wheeler (2)
- Goals: (Australia) Blake Wallace (England) Gareth O'Brien (7)
- Points: (England) Gareth O'Brien (18)
← 2019	List of seasons

The 2020 Toronto Wolfpack season was the Wolfpack's fourth season overall and the club started its first season in the Super League. The COVID-19 pandemic saw the season suspended after round 7 on 15 March 2020. The season did not resume until August and the mounting financial pressures on the club forced the club's management to withdraw the team from the 2020 Super League season on 20 July. Super League expunged the teams completed results from the season's results although individual player statistics such as appearances and points scored will still be recorded. At the time the season was suspended the team were bottom of Super League with a 0–6 record.

== 2020 squad ==
2020 Toronto Wolfpack
First Team Squad		Coaching staff
1 (England) Gareth O'Brien – FB, SH, SO; 2 (Scotland) Matty Russell – FB, WG; 3 (New Zealand) Chase Stanley – CE, SO, WG; 4 (Samoa) Ricky Leutele – CE; 5 (Ireland) Liam Kay – WG; 6 (England) Joe Mellor – SO, SH; 7 (Australia) Josh McCrone (c) – HB, HK; 8 (England) Adam Sidlow – PR, SR; 9 (England) Andy Ackers – HK; 10 (Ireland) Anthony Mullally – PR; 11 (England) Andrew Dixon – LF, SR; 12 (New Zealand) Bodene Thompson – CE, SR; 13 (England) Jon Wilkin (vc) – LF, SH, SO, SR	14 (Australia) Darcy Lussick – PR; 15 (France) Gadwin Springer – PR; 16 (England) Tom Olbison – SR; 17 (Australia) Blake Wallace – SH, SO; 18 (England) Brad Singleton – PR; 19 (England) Gary Wheeler – CE, SO; 20 (Scotland) James Cunningham – HK, SH; 21 (New Zealand) Sonny Bill Williams – CE, SR; 22 (England) Greg Worthington – CE; 23 (France) Hakim Miloudi – FB, CE, SO, WG	Head coach: Brian McDermott; Assistant coaches: Chris Plume; Kurt Haggerty; Legend: (c) Captain(s); (vc) Vice-captain(s); Updated: 17 January 2020; Source(s): 2020 Squad Numbers

== Fixtures and results ==
Win Draw Loss

=== Pre-season friendlies ===
Date	Home	Score	Away	Venue	Attendance
19 January	Castleford Tigers	10-16	Toronto Wolfpack	Wheldon Road	

=== Challenge Cup ===
Date	Rnd	Home	Score	Away	Venue	Tries	Goals	Attendance
11 March	5	Huddersfield Giants	0-18	Toronto Wolfpack	John Smiths Stadium	Leutele (2)	O'Brien 5/5	1,000

=== Super League ===
These results were expunged and will not be recorded in the Super League statistics however individual statistics will remain official.

Date and time	Rnd	Versus	H/A	Venue	Result	Score	Tries	Goals	Attendance	TV	Report
2 February, 14:30	1	Castleford Tigers	H	Headingley	L	10–28	Kay, Miloudi	Wallace	19,500	Sky Sports	Report
8 February, 14:00	2	Salford Red Devils	A	AJ Bell Stadium	L	16–24	Wheeler (2), Singleton	Wallace (2)	4,523		Report
13 February, 19:45	3	Wigan Warriors	A	DW Stadium	L	10–32	Russell, Thompson	Wallace	10,333	Sky Sports	Report
21 February, 19:45	4	Warrington Wolves	A	Halliwell Jones Stadium	L	22–32	Ackers, O'Brien, Russell, Wilkin	Wallace (3)	11,182		Report
29 February, 18:00	5	St Helens	H	Halliwell Jones Stadium	L	0–32	—N/a	—N/a	4,823	Sky Sports	Report
5 March, 19:45	6	Leeds Rhinos	A	Headingley	L	12–66	McCrone, Wells	O'Brien (2)	12,143	Sky Sports	Report
P–P (Note: as a result of the COVID-19 outbreak, the RFL announced a suspension of fixtures in the Betfred Super League season indefinitely, during which time the season’s structure and fixture rescheduling will be considered.)	7	Hull KR	A	Craven Park							Report
P–P	8	Wakefield Trinity	A	TBA							

== Player statistics ==
As of 11 March 2020

#	Player	Position	Tries	Goals	DG	Points
1	Gareth O'Brien	Fullback	1	7	0	18
2	Matty Russell	Wing	2	0	0	8
3	Chase Stanley	Centre	0	0	0	0
4	Ricky Leutele	Centre	2	0	0	8
5	Liam Kay	Wing	1	0	0	4
6	Joe Mellor	Halfback	0	0	0	0
7	Josh McCrone	Scrum-half	1	0	0	4
8	Adam Sidlow	Prop	0	0	0	0
9	Andy Ackers	Hooker	1	0	0	4
10	Anthony Mullally	Prop	0	0	0	0
11	Andrew Dixon	Second-row	0	0	0	0
12	Bodene Thompson	Second-row	1	0	0	4
13	Jon Wilkin	Loose forward	1	0	0	4
14	Darcy Lussick	Prop	0	0	0	0
15	Gadwin Springer	Prop	0	0	0	0
16	Tom Olbison	Second-row	0	0	0	0
17	Blake Wallace	Stand-off	0	7	0	14
18	Brad Singleton	Prop	1	0	0	4
19	Gary Wheeler	Wing	2	0	0	8
20	James Cunningham	Hooker	0	0	0	0
21	Sonny Bill Williams	Second-row	0	0	0	0
22	Greg Worthington	Centre	0	0	0	0
23	Hakim Miloudi	Wing	1	0	0	4
24	Tony Gigot	Fullback	0	0	0	0
25	Jack Wells	Prop	1	0	0	4

== 2020 transfers ==
=== In ===
Nat	Name	Position	Signed from	Date
(New Zealand)	Sonny Bill Williams	Second row	Blues	November 2019
(Ireland)	Brad Singleton	Prop	Leeds Rhinos	November 2019
(England)	James Cunningham	Hooker	London Broncos	November 2019
(France)	Tony Gigot	Fullback	Catalans Dragons	February 2020
(England)	Jack Wells	Second row	Wigan Warriors (Loan)	February 2020
(Canada)	Quinn Ngawati	Centre	—N/a	March 2020

=== Out ===
Nat	Player	Position	Club signed	Date
(Fiji)	Ashton Sims	Prop	Retired	August 2019
(England)	Nick Rawsthorne	Centre	Hull Kingston Rovers	October 2019
(Ireland)	Bob Beswick	Hooker	Newcastle Thunder	October 2019
(England)	Ryan Brierley	Scrum half	Hull Kingston Rovers	December 2019
(England)	Greg Worthington (Note: On 9 game loan to Featherstone Rovers)	Centre	Featherstone Rovers	December 2019

== Milestones ==
- Round 1: James Cunningham, Brad Singleton and Sonny Bill Williams made their debuts for the Wolfpack.
- Round 2: Brad Singleton scored his 1st try for the Wolfpack.
- Round 4: Tony Gigot made his debut for the Wolfpack.
- Round 5: Jack Wells made his debut for the Wolfpack.
- Round 6: Jack Wells scored his 1st try for the Wolfpack.
