= Jack Wells (rugby league) =

English rugby league footballer

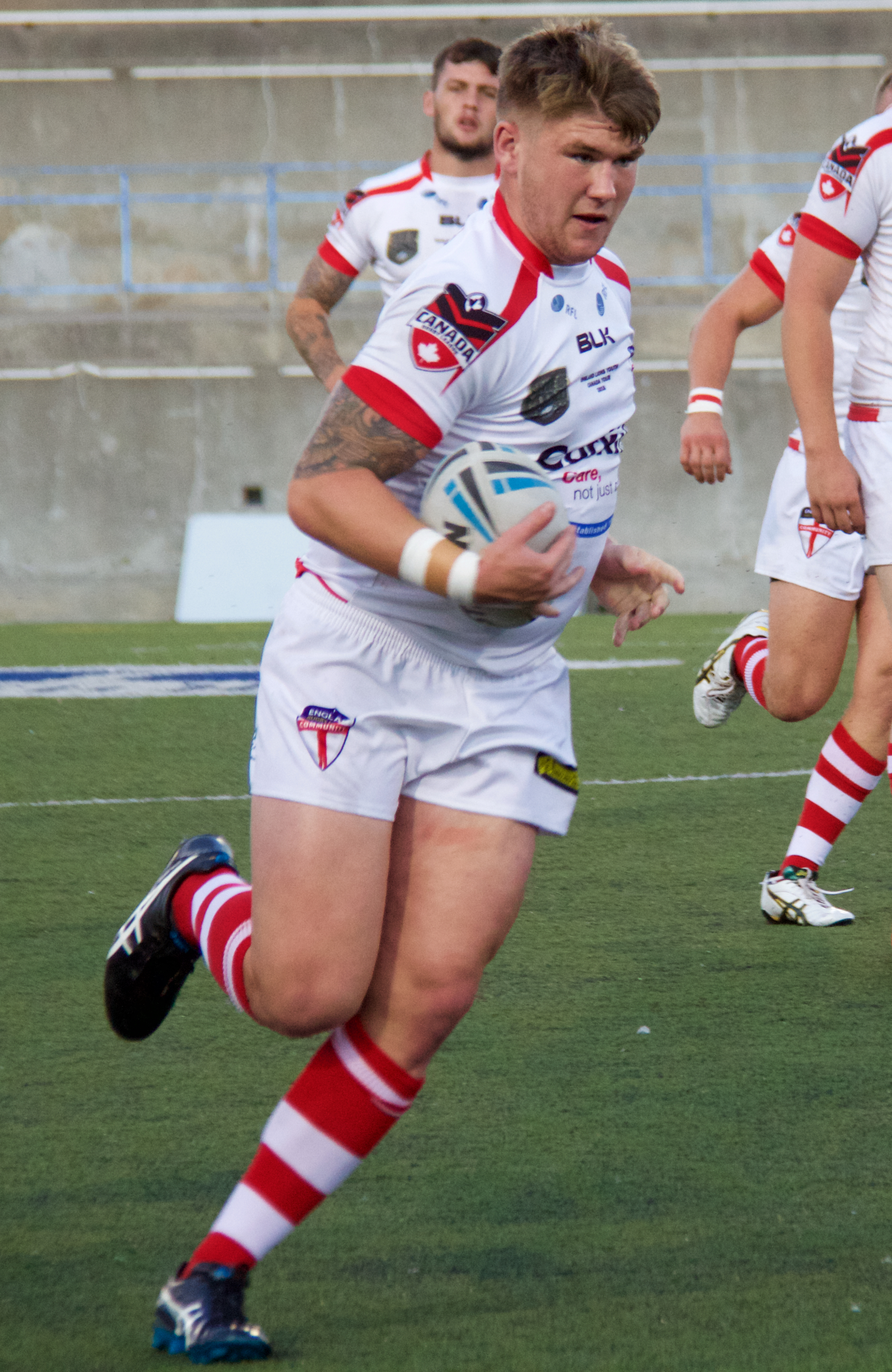

Personal information
- Born: 21 September 1997 (age 28) Salford, Greater Manchester, England
- Height: 6 ft 1 in (1.85 m)
- Weight: 16 st 1 lb (102 kg)

Playing information
- Position: Second-row
Club
Years	Team	Pld	T	G	FG	P
2016–20	Wigan Warriors	18	1	0	0	4
2019(loan)	→ Swinton Lions	16	3	0	0	12
2019(loan)	→ Toronto Wolfpack	2	1	0	0	4
2021–22	Salford Red Devils	8	1	0	0	4
2022–23	Barrow Raiders	17	0	0	0	0
	Total	61	6	0	0	24
- Source: As of 23 Sep 2022

Jack Wells (born 21 September 1997) is a professional rugby league footballer who last played as a second-row forward for Barrow Raiders in the RFL Championship.

He played for the Wigan Warriors in the Super League, and spent time on loan from Wigan at both the Swinton Lions and the Toronto Wolfpack in the Betfred Championship.

== Background ==
Wells was born in Salford, Greater Manchester, England.

== Playing career ==
=== Wigan Warriors ===
He has spent time on loan from Wigan at both the Swinton Lions and Toronto Wolfpack in the Betfred Championship.

=== Salford Red Devils ===
On 16 December 2020 it was announced that Wells would be joining the Salford Red Devils for the 2021 season; his hometown club and the club he supported as a boy. He left the Red Devils after disappointing in super league dropping down to play part time rugby. His brother Daniel became involved in a scandal.
