= Jack Logan (rugby league) =

English rugby league footballer

Personal information
- Born: 8 September 1995 (age 29); Hull, England
- Height: 6 ft 0 in (1.82 m)
- Weight: 15 st 4 lb (97 kg)

Playing information
- Position: Centre
Club
Years	Team	Pld	T	G	FG	P
2014–19	Hull F.C.	40	13	0	0	52
2015(loan)	→ Doncaster	2	2	0	0	8
2017(loan)	→ Doncaster	2	2	0	0	8
2017(loan)	→ Hull Kingston Rovers	0	0	0	0	0
2018(loan)	→ Doncaster	7	8	0	0	32
2019(loan)	→ Toronto Wolfpack	3	1	0	0	4
2020	Doncaster	2	0	0	0	0
2021	Batley Bulldogs	2	1	0	0	4
2021(loan)	→ Hull F.C.	1	1	0	0	4
2021	Leigh Centurions	1	0	0	0	0
2022	York City Knights	3	0	0	0	0
	Total	63	28	0	0	112
- Source: As of 1 January 2023

Jack Logan (born 8 September 1995) is an English professional rugby league footballer who played as a centre for the York City Knights in the RFL Championship.

He previously played for Hull F.C. in the Super League, and has spent time on loan from Hull at Doncaster, Hull Kingston Rovers in the Super League and the Toronto Wolfpack in the Championship. He has also played for the Batley Bulldogs in the RFL Championship, and on loan from Batley at FC in the top flight.

== Background ==
Logan was born in Kingston upon Hull, Humberside, England.

== Playing career ==
=== Hull FC ===
On 18 July 2014, Logan made his début for Hull in their 2014 Super League match against Wigan at the DW Stadium.

=== Doncaster RLFC ===
Logan is dual registered with Doncaster in the Championship, and played two games for the club.

=== Toronto Wolfpack ===
Logan spent time on loan at the Toronto Wolfpack in the Championship during the 2019 season.

=== Batley Bulldogs ===
On 22 February 2021 it was reported that he had signed for the Batley Bulldogs in the RFL Championship.

=== Hull F.C. (loan) ===
On 22 June 2021 it was reported that he had signed for Hull F.C. in the Super League on loan.

=== Leigh Centurions ===
On 4 August 2021 it was reported that he had signed for the Leigh Centurions in the Super League.

=== York City Knights ===
On 13 November 2021 it was reported that he had signed for York in the RFL Championship.
