= Josh McCrone =

Australian rugby league footballer

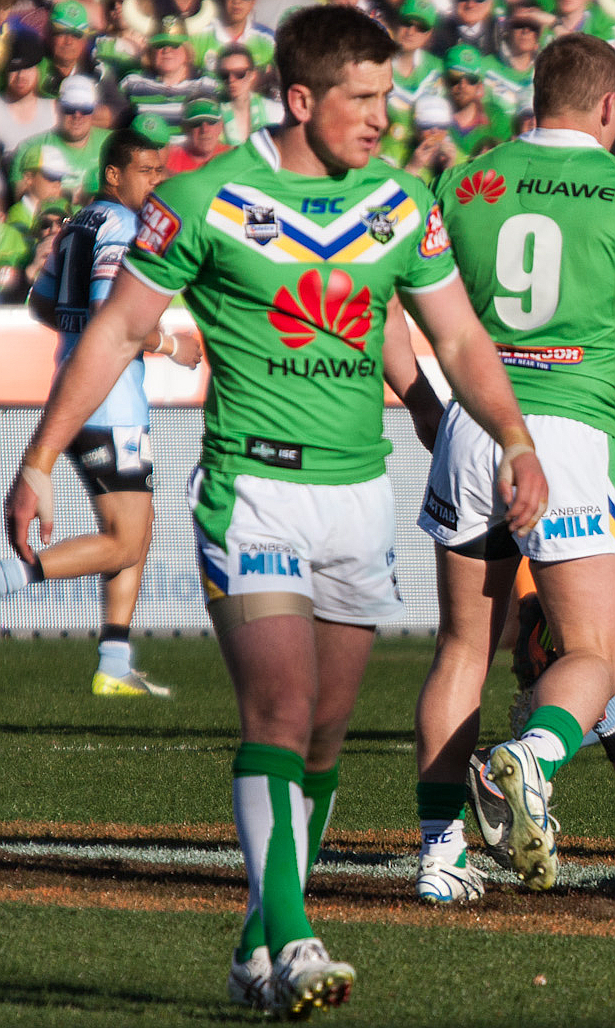

Personal information
- Full name: Joshua McCrone
- Born: 12 April 1987 (age 39) Temora, New South Wales, Australia

Playing information
- Height: 180 cm (5 ft 11 in)
- Weight: 89 kg (14 st 0 lb)
- Position: Halfback, Five-eighth, Hooker
Club
| Years | Team | Pld | T | G | FG | P |
|---|---|---|---|---|---|---|
| 2009–15 | Canberra Raiders | 133 | 34 | 0 | 1 | 137 |
| 2016–17 | St. George Illawarra | 28 | 1 | 0 | 0 | 4 |
| 2018–20 | Toronto Wolfpack | 40 | 10 | 1 | 1 | 43 |
| | Total | 201 | 45 | 1 | 2 | 184 |
Representative
| Years | Team | Pld | T | G | FG | P |
| 2012–14 | Country Origin | 3 | 1 | 0 | 0 | 4 |

Josh McCrone (born 12 April 1987) is an Australian former professional rugby league footballer who played as a halfback and five-eighth. He last played for the Toronto Wolfpack in the Super League.

He has previously played for the Canberra Raiders and the St. George Illawarra Dragons in the NRL. McCrone played for the Country Origin side between 2012 and 2014.

== Early and personal life ==
McCrone was born in Temora, New South Wales, Australia.

He played his junior football for the Temora Dragons and represented the Country Rugby League at a junior level.

He is qualified as an electrician. McCrone and rugby league player Ryan Hinchcliffe are brothers-in-law.

== Early career ==
McCrone started his professional career with the Canberra Raiders but failed to break into the first-grade team in two seasons. He was signed by the Penrith Panthers in 2007, following coach Matthew Elliott from Canberra to Penrith, before returning to Canberra at the end of the 2008 season without having appeared in the NRL.

== First-grade career ==
He moved to the Canberra Raiders in 2009, making his first NRL appearance in April at Halfback.

McCrone was demoted from the side at the beginning of the 2010 NRL season, relegated to Canberra's feeder club Souths Logan. By the end of the 2010 season, he had returned as the Raiders' regular halfback, forming a combination with five-eighth Terry Campese to lead the team to a six-match winning streak, landing the Canberra club in the finals before being knocked out by the Wests Tigers. McCrone re-signed with Canberra through to the end of the 2012 NRL season.

In the 2011 NRL season, McCrone scored 9 tries and played five-eighth for the majority of the year due to Terry Campese being injured. As a result, the Canberra club signed Matt Orford from the Super League but used rookie Sam Williams instead for most of the year to partner McCrone in the halves.

Demoted to the New South Wales Cup for most of 2015, McCrone was named at five-eighth in their 2015 Team of the Year.

On 12 October 2015, McCrone signed a two-year contract with the St. George Illawarra Dragons starting in 2016.

On 13 September 2017, it was revealed that McCrone had signed a contract to join The Toronto Wolfpack. In the 2018 season, Toronto reached the Million Pound Game against the London Broncos but lost the match 4–2. In 2019, McCrone was part of the Toronto side who were promoted to the Super League after defeating Featherstone in the Million Pound Game.

== Post playing ==
McCrone announced his retirement from rugby league after spending time playing for the Temora Dragons in Group 9 Rugby League.

== Statistics ==
| Year | Team | Games | Tries | Goals | FGs | Pts |
|---|---|---|---|---|---|---|
| 2009 | Canberra Raiders | 9 | 4 | | | 16 |
| 2010 | Canberra Raiders | 22 | 7 | | | 28 |
| 2011 | Canberra Raiders | 24 | 9 | | 1 | 37 |
| 2012 | Canberra Raiders | 26 | 5 | | | 20 |
| 2013 | Canberra Raiders | 24 | 4 | | | 16 |
| 2014 | Canberra Raiders | 24 | 5 | | | 20 |
| 2015 | Canberra Raiders | 4 | | | | |
| 2016 | St. George Illawarra Dragons | 7 | | | | |
| 2017 | St. George Illawarra Dragons | 21 | 1 | | | 4 |
| 2018 | Toronto Wolfpack | 11 | 1 | | | 4 |
| 2019 | Toronto Wolfpack | 28 | 9 | 1 | 1 | 39 |
| 2020 | Toronto Wolfpack | 7 | 1 | | | 4 |
| | Totals | 201 | 45 | 1 | 2 | 184 |

== Representative career ==
In 2012, McCrone was brought into the New South Wales Country side for the annual City vs Country Origin match after Danny Buderus was ruled out.
