= Jon Wilkin =

GB & England rugby league footballer & Sports broadcaster

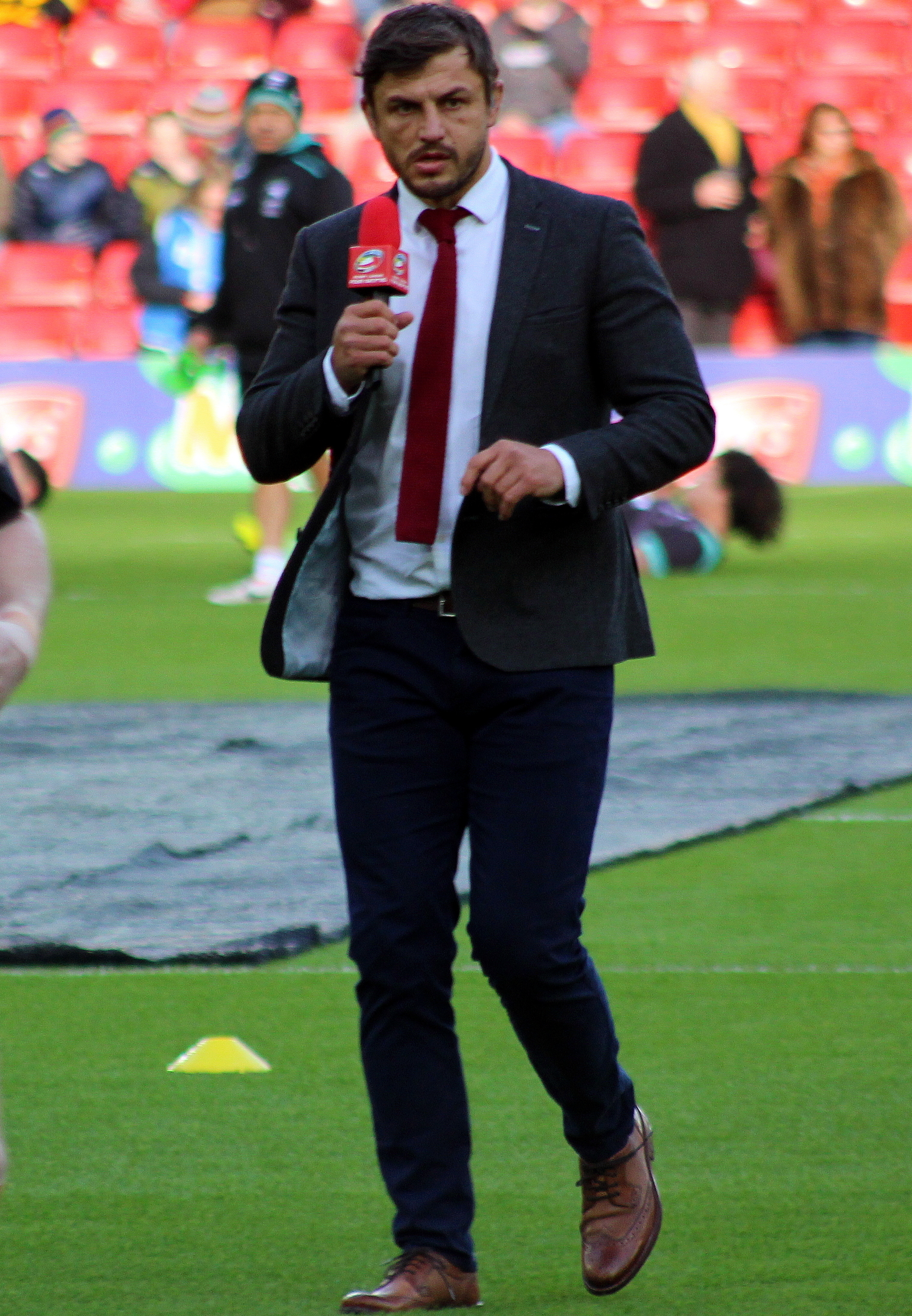

Personal information
- Full name: Jon David Wilkin
- Born: 1 November 1983 (age 42) Hull, Humberside, England

Playing information
- Height: 5 ft 11 in (1.81 m)
- Weight: 14 st 13 lb (95 kg)
- Position: Second-row, Loose forward, Scrum-half, Stand-off
Club
Years	Team	Pld	T	G	FG	P
2000–02	Hull Kingston Rovers	39	8	0	1	33
2003–18	St Helens	424	94	0	2	378
2019–20	Toronto Wolfpack	32	3	0	0	12
	Total	495	105	0	3	423
Representative
Years	Team	Pld	T	G	FG	P
2004–11	England	10	1	0	0	4
2006–07	Great Britain	6	0	0	0	0
- Spouse: Fran Halsall (m. 2018)

Jon David Wilkin (born 1 November 1983) is an English former professional rugby league footballer who played as a second-row, loose forward, scrum-half or stand-off in the 2000s, 2010s and 2020s. He played for Hull Kingston Rovers, St Helens and the Toronto Wolfpack at club level and for England and Great Britain at international level.

== Background ==
Wilkin was born in Kingston upon Hull, East Yorkshire, England.

== Club career ==
=== Hull Kingston Rovers ===
Wilkin started his career at Hull Kingston Rovers. He made his debut for the club in 2002 which was also his only season at his boyhood club as he signed for Super League club St Helens for Super League VIII in 2003.

=== St Helens ===
The 2006 season was a new high point in Wilkin's career. He was a key member of the treble-winning team as Saints won the 2006 Challenge Cup, when he played with a broken nose. St Helens reached the 2006 Super League Grand final to be contested against Hull FC, and Wilkin played at second-row in Saints' 26–4 victory.

St Helens won the BBC TV Sports Personality of the Year Team of the Year award, with Daniel Anderson taking the Best Coach honour. Wilkin was recognised for his good season by being named in the 2006 Super League Dream Team.

As 2006 Super League champions, St Helens faced 2006 NRL Premiers the Brisbane Broncos in the 2007 World Club Challenge. Wilkin played at loose forward in the Saints' 18–14 victory.

He played in St Helens' 2008 Super League XIII Grand Final defeat by Leeds.

He played in the 2009 Super League Grand Final defeat by the Leeds Rhinos at Old Trafford.

He played in the 2011 Super League Grand Final defeat by the Leeds Rhinos at Old Trafford.

=== Toronto Wolfpack ===
Wilkin signed for the Toronto Wolfpack ahead of the 2019 season. In July 2020 Wilkin announced that he would retire at the end of the 2020 season.

== International career ==
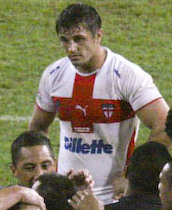
Wilkin playing against the Kiwis at the 2008 RLWC

Wilkin was called in to the Great Britain squad 2005 Tri Nations but did not feature in the competition.

He was included in the 25-man Great Britain squad for the 2006 Tri-Nations tour of Australia and New Zealand. Wilkin made his international début from the bench at the Sydney Football Stadium, Sydney on 4 November 2006 against Australia. He came off the bench in two further games in that series, the first against New Zealand in Wellington, and the second against Australia in Brisbane.

Wilkin was selected for the England squad to compete in the 2008 Rugby League World Cup tournament in Australia. In the first match against Papua New Guinea he played from the interchange bench in England's victory.

== Personal life ==
Wilkin won The Observer's first Community Champion Award.

In January 2012, it was announced that Wilkin was to be the first chairman of the newly founded Players' Association; League 13.

In 2015 Wilkin opened an independent coffee shop in partnership with former St Helens teammate Mark Flanagan in Manchester city centre.

In 2013, Wilkin married his first wife Megan although they subsequently divorced. In 2018, Wilkin married British swimmer Fran Halsall. In 2022, Wilkin joined Sky Sports to become one of the pundits for their rugby league coverage.
