= Hakim Miloudi =

France international rugby league footballer

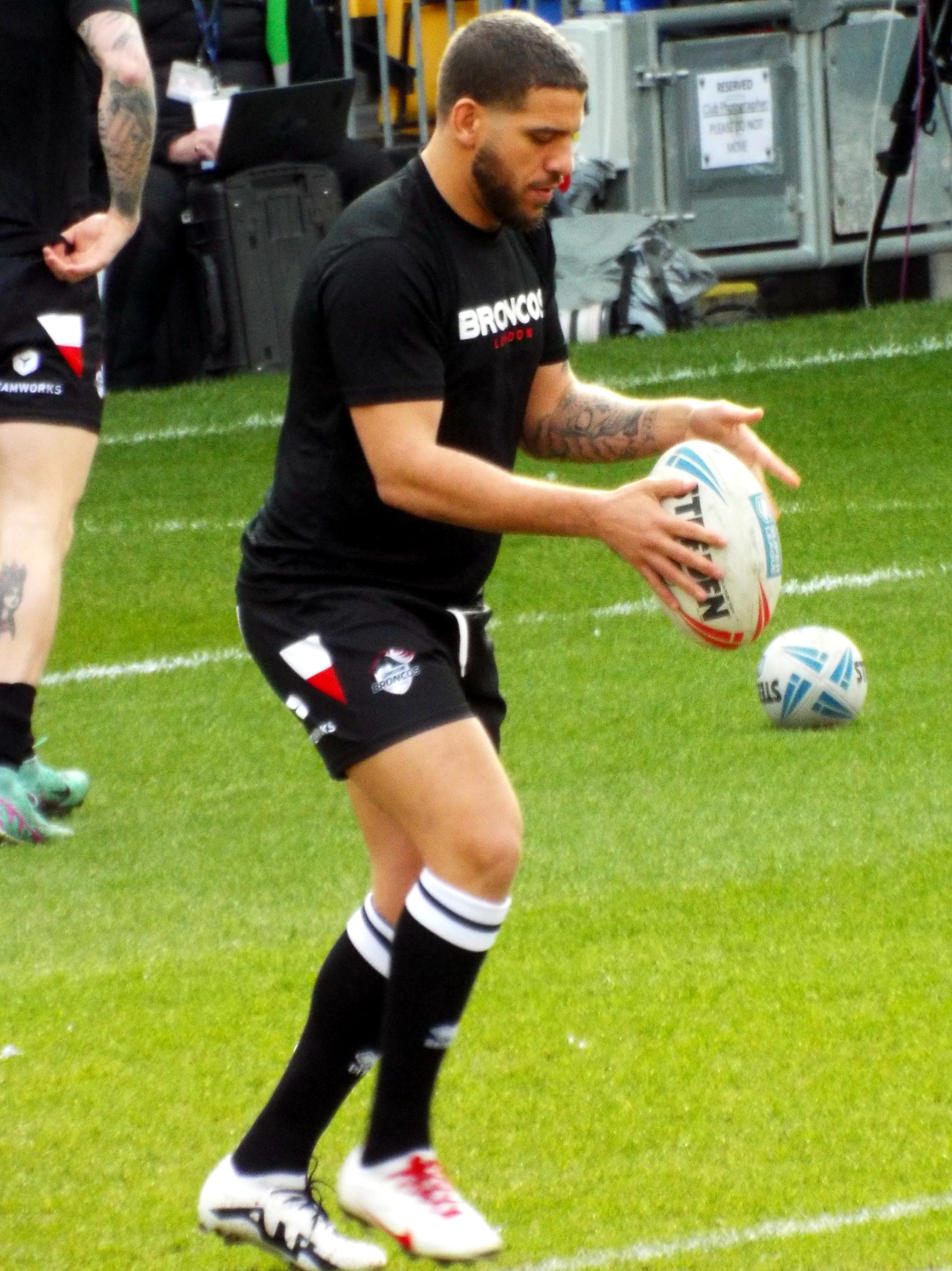

Personal information
- Born: 26 June 1993 (age 33) Perpignan, Pyrénées-Orientales, France
- Height: 5 ft 10 in (1.78 m)
- Weight: 14 st 5 lb (91 kg)

Playing information

Rugby league
- Position: Fullback, Stand-off, Centre, Wing
Club
Years	Team	Pld	T	G	FG	P
2013–15	Saint-Esteve	28	23	0	0	92
2015–16	Palau XIII Broncos	11	11	29	1	103
2016	AS Carcassonne	19	21	10	1	106
2017–19	Hull F.C.	16	5	1	0	22
2017(loan)	→ Doncaster	5	2	0	0	8
2018(loan)	→ Doncaster	8	10	19	1	79
2019(loan)	→ Doncaster	3	2	0	0	8
2019–20	Toronto Wolfpack	17	4	4	1	25
2021	Palau XIII Broncos	11	6	2	1	29
2021–22	Barrow Raiders	26	12	0	0	48
2023	Albi XIII	0	0	0	0	0
2023	Limoux Grizzlies	7	3	0	0	12
2024	London Broncos	16	5	0	0	8
2024–26	Baroudeurs de Pia XIII	11	11	0	0	0
2026–	Limoux Grizzlies	0	0	0	0	0
	Total	178	115	65	5	540
Representative
Years	Team	Pld	T	G	FG	P
2017–18	France	7	1	0	1	4
2019	France 9s	3	0	3	0	6

Rugby union
Club
Years	Team	Pld	T	G	FG	P
2015–2016	AS Béziers Hérault	4	5	0	0	5
Representative
Years	Team	Pld	T	G	FG	P
2023	Algeria 7s	13	11	2	0	59
- Source: As of 9 November 2026

Hakim Miloudi (born 26 June 1993) is a French professional rugby league footballer who plays as a fullback or winger for the Limoux Grizzlies in the Super XIII, and has represented France at international level.

He previously played for Saint-Esteve, AS Carcassonne, Baroudeurs de Pia XIII in France and for Canadian club Toronto Wolfpack in the Championship and Super League. Miloudi has also played for Hull F.C. in the Super League, and on loan from Hull at Doncaster in League 1.

== Background ==
Miloudi was born in Perpignan, France.

== Playing career ==
=== Early career ===
Miloudi began his career at Saint-Esteve XIII Catalan and played in the Elite One Championship for AS Carcassonne. He represented France at junior international level, winning man of the match for France u18s in a victory over Australian Schoolboys.

=== Hull F.C. ===
In 2017 Miloudi joined Hull F.C. on trial and later signed a two-year contract. He was then sent on loan to Doncaster. While playing for Doncaster in 2018 he tied the club record for most points scored in a match, scoring 32 points in a victory over Coventry Bears.

On 2 April 2018 he made his Super League début for Hull F.C. against Wakefield Trinity.

=== Palau XIII Broncos ===
On 16 October 2020, it was reported that Miloudi had signed for Palau XIII Broncos in the Elite One Championship.

=== Barrow Raiders ===
On 10 May 2021 it was reported that he had signed for Barrow Raiders in the RFL League 1

=== London Broncos ===
On 1 Jan 2024 it was reported that he had signed for London Broncos in the Super League on a 1-year deal.

=== Baroudeurs de Pia XIII ===
On 25 September 2024 it was reported that he had signed for Baroudeurs de Pia XIII in the Super XIII

=== Limoux Grizzlies ===
On 9 November 2026 it was reported that he had signed for Limoux Grizzlies in the Super XIII

== International career ==
Miloudi made his debut for France in their pre-tournament match against Jamaica. He was named in France's squad for the 2017 World Cup but was dropped for reportedly missing the bus to the airport. He returned to the French team in 2018 for their match against England and the subsequent 2018 European Championship.

Miloudi was included in France's squad for the 2019 Rugby League World Cup 9s.

In 2023 he played rugby union for Algeria in the 2023 Africa Men's Sevens; Algeria won the competition.
