= Darcy Lussick =

Australian rugby league footballer

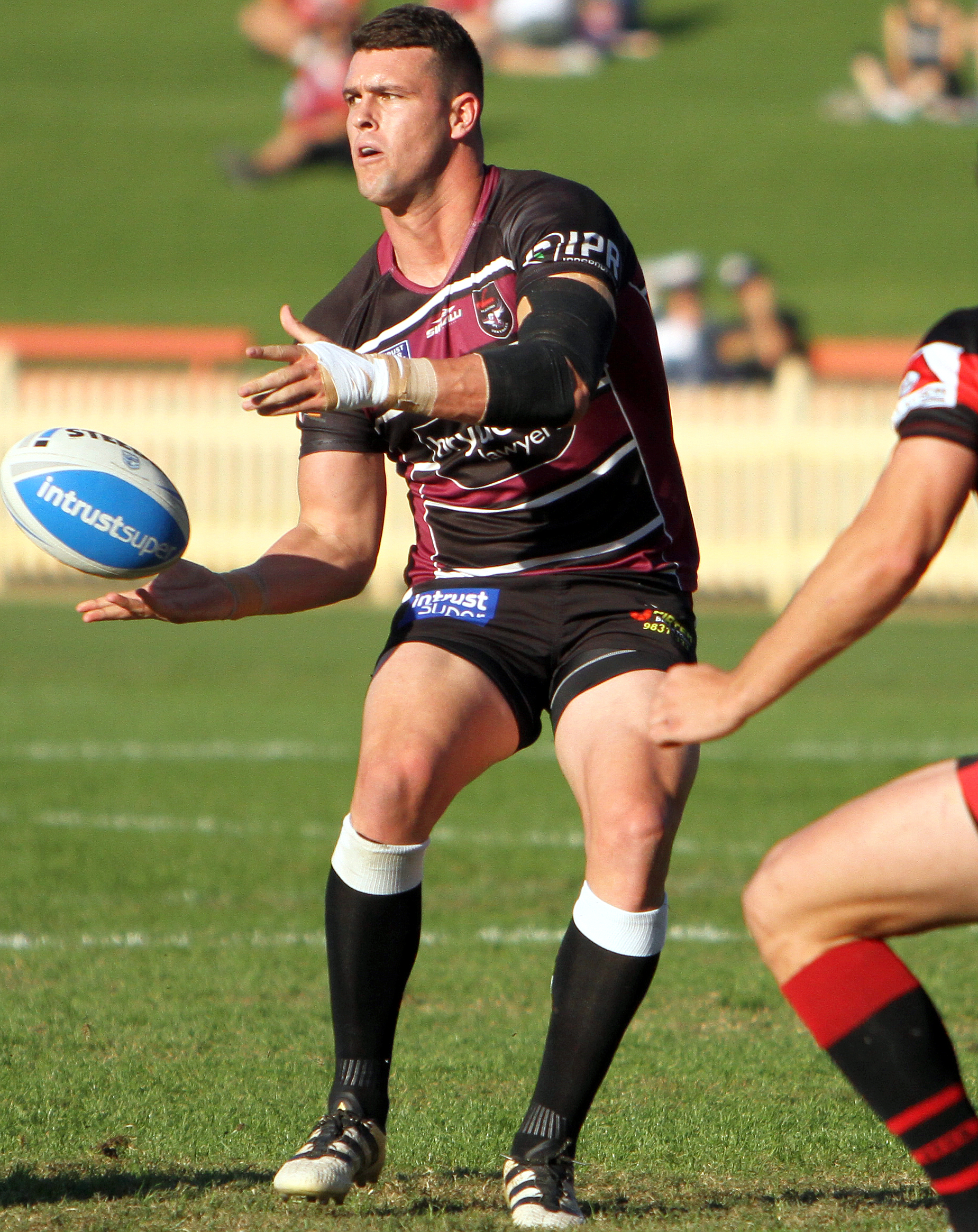

Personal information
- Born: 6 June 1989 (age 37) Manly, New South Wales, Australia
- Height: 6 ft 4 in (193 cm)
- Weight: 17 st 13 lb (114 kg)

Playing information
- Position: Prop
Club
Years	Team	Pld	T	G	FG	P
2011–12	Manly Sea Eagles	32	1	0	0	4
2013–15	Parramatta Eels	53	0	0	88	0
2016–18	Manly Sea Eagles	33	0	0	0	0
2018–20	Toronto Wolfpack	43	5	0	0	20
2021	Salford Red Devils	5	1	0	0	4
2021(loan)	→ Featherstone Rovers	3	0	0	0	0
	Total	169	7	0	88	28
Representative
Years	Team	Pld	T	G	FG	P
2010	Queensland Residents	1	0	0	0	0
2014–16	NSW City	2	0	0	0	0
- Source: As of 5 January 2024
- Relatives: Freddy Lussick (brother); Joey Lussick (brother)

Darcy Lussick (born 6 June 1989) is an Australian professional rugby league footballer who last played as a prop for Featherstone Rovers in the RFL Championship, on loan from Super League side Salford Red Devils.

He previously played for the Manly Warringah Sea Eagles in two separate spells and the Parramatta Eels in the NRL. Lussick also played for the Toronto Wolfpack in the Championship and the Super League.

== Background ==
Lussick was born in Manly, New South Wales in 1989.

== Early career ==
Lussick played his junior football for the Beacon Hill Bears. He also played for the Manly-Warringah Sea Eagles S.G. Ball side in 2007.

== Club career ==
=== Manly Warringah ===
Lussick made his debut game in round 14, 2011 against the North Queensland Cowboys, a game which Manly ran out easy 24–4 winners at Brookvale Oval against the previously in-form Cowboys. Lussick is also known for his part in the "Battle of Brookvale" which resulted in a three match suspension. Manly would go on to be premiers in 2011 but Lussick played no part in the club's finals campaign or the 2011 NRL Grand Final.

=== Parramatta ===
On 14 June 2012, Lussick signed a 3-year deal with the Parramatta Eels. Lussick won the Ken Thornett NRL Players' Player Medal. At the Eels Lussick become an ambassador for Midas, The Kellyville Bushrangers and made an appearance on The Footy Show.

2013 saw Lussick win multiple players' players awards. At the end of the 2013 NRL season, Lussick had an over due groin operation which he played most of the season with. In Lussick's first year at the Parramatta Eels he won the prestigious Ken Thornett NRL Players' Player award 2013.

In March 2014, Lussick was suspended for 4 matches due to a tackle on a Sydney Roosters player, Jared Waerea-Hargreaves.

At the end of his playing time with Parramatta, Lussick had played 53 games and had scored no tries. He was also a member of the Parramatta side which finished last in 2013.

=== Return to Manly-Warringah ===
On 18 August 2015, Lussick signed a three-year contract to return to the Manly-Warringah Sea Eagles starting in 2016.

On 21 May 2017, Lussick was sin binned for an illegal shoulder charge on a North Sydney player when he was playing for Blacktown Workers Sea Eagles against North Sydney at North Sydney Oval.

On 16 July 2017, while Lussick was playing for the Sea Eagles against the Wests Tigers, Lussick pulled Wests Tigers captain Aaron Woods' hair. Lussick was charged with contrary conduct by the NRL, entered an early guilty plea, and was fined $1350.

On 23 July 2017, Lussick was sin binned in Manly's 52–22 loss against the St George Illawarra Dragons for punching St George player Jack De Belin.

=== Toronto Wolfpack ===
On 21 April 2018, Lussick left Manly to join the Toronto Wolfpack. It was reported that Lussick departed the club due to coach Trent Barrett's refusal to pick him for the first grade side despite being fit and had overcome his injuries. It was also reported that Lussick and Barrett had a verbal altercation at training in the lead up to Lussick's departure.

On 7 October, Lussick played in Toronto's 4–2 defeat against London Broncos in the Million Pound Game.

In 2019, Lussick played in Toronto's Million Pound Game victory over Featherstone to secure promotion to the Super League for the first time.

=== Salford Red Devils ===
On 1 January 2021, it was reported that Lussick had signed for Salford.

In round 8 of the 2021 Super League season, he scored his first try for Salford but was later sent to the sin bin for a dangerous high tackle in the club's 62–18 loss.

=== Featherstone Rovers (loan) ===
On 7 June 2021, it was reported that he had signed for Featherstone Rovers in the RFL Championship on loan.

== Boxing career ==
On 6 December 2019, Lussick made his professional boxing debut against former NRL player Justin Hodges (2–0, 2 KOs). Lussick won in his debut fight, knocking out Hodges in the first 39 seconds of the bout.

Lussick fought Paul Gallen (11–1–1, 6 KOs) in his second professional bout on 22 December 2021, putting up a brave effort but was outclassed and gassed in the first round, ultimately leading to a third round TKO for Gallen.

== Professional boxing record ==
No.	Result	Record	Opponent	Type	Round, time	Date	Location	Notes
2	Loss	1–1	Paul Gallen	TKO	3 (3)	22 Dec 2021	The Star Event Centre, Sydney, Australia	
1	Win	1–0	Justin Hodges	TKO	1 (3)	6 Dec 2019	ICC Sydney, Sydney, Australia	

== Personal life ==
Darcy is the older brother of Joey Lussick who plays hooker with the Parramatta Eels. His mother died in May 2016 at the age of 42, after a two year battle with an illness.
