= Anthony Mullally =

Ireland international rugby league footballer

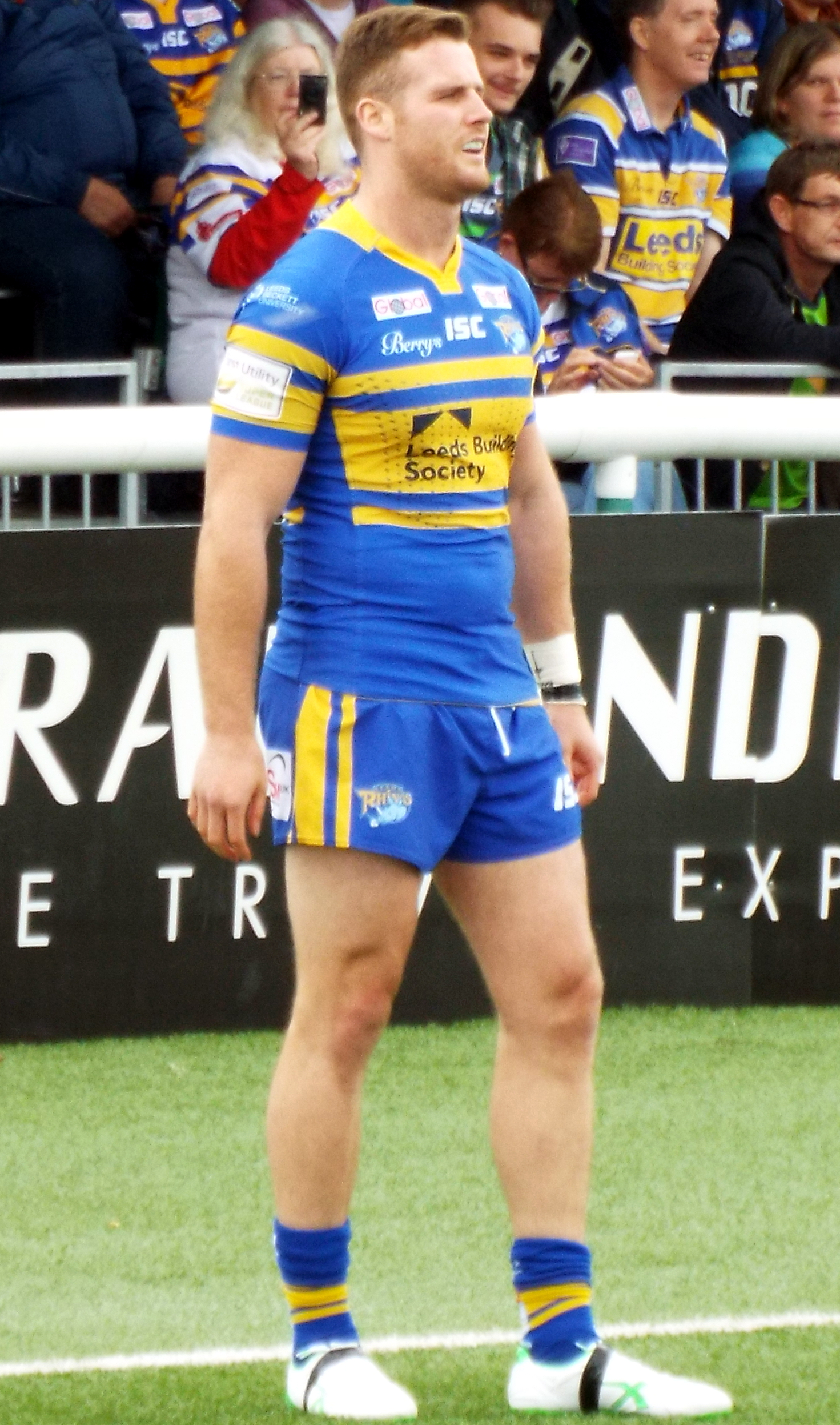

Personal information
- Full name: Anthony Winston Colleen Mullally
- Born: 28 June 1991 (age 34); Widnes, Cheshire, England
- Height: 6 ft 5 in (196 cm)
- Weight: 17 st 7 lb (111 kg)

Playing information
- Position: Prop
Club
Years	Team	Pld	T	G	FG	P
2009–12	Widnes Vikings	11	0	0	0	0
2010(loan)	→ Swinton Lions	6	2	0	0	8
2012(loan)	→ Whitehaven	3	1	0	0	4
2013–15	Huddersfield Giants	38	5	0	0	20
2013(loan)	→ Batley Bulldogs	13	4	0	0	16
2014(loan)	→ Bradford Bulls	6	0	0	0	0
2013(loan)	→ Batley Bulldogs	2	0	0	0	0
2015(loan)	→ Wakefield Trinity Wildcats	9	2	0	0	8
2016–19	Leeds Rhinos	71	10	0	0	40
2016(loan)	→ Featherstone Rovers	3	0	0	0	0
2017(loan)	→ Featherstone Rovers	1	0	0	0	0
2019–20	Toronto Wolfpack	10	0	0	0	0
2021	AS Carcassonne	4	0	0	0	0
2022	Cornwall	9	1	0	0	4
	Total	186	25	0	0	100
Representative
Years	Team	Pld	T	G	FG	P
2013–	Ireland	7	0	0	0	0
- Source: As of 22 Jul 2022

Anthony Winston Mullally (born 28 June 1991), also known by the nickname of "Vegan Warrior", is a former Ireland international rugby league footballer who last played as a prop for Cornwall in Betfred League One

He has previously played for French club Carcassonne the Widnes Vikings in the Championship and the Super League. Mullally spent time on loan from Widnes at the Swinton Lions and Whitehaven in Championship 1. He played for the Huddersfield Giants in the top flight, and on loan from Huddersfield at the Dewsbury Rams and the Batley Bulldogs in the Championship and the Bradford Bulls, Wakefield Trinity Wildcats and most recently the Toronto Wolfpack in the Super League. Mullally has also played for the Leeds Rhinos in the Super League, and on loan from Leeds in the Championship.

He played for Ireland at the 2013 Rugby League World Cup and the 2017 Rugby League World Cup.

== Background ==
Mullally was born in Widnes on 28 June 1991.

Mullally is a former vegetarian and became vegan for ethical reasons. He is known as the "Vegan Warrior".

Mullally is also a Brazilian jiu-jitsu practitioner and was promoted to blue belt in the martial art in 2023.

== Career ==
In 2011, Mullally spent a season with the Brisbane Broncos, playing 21 games for their Under-20 side.

=== Widnes Vikings ===
Mullally started his career at Championship side the Widnes Vikings in 2009 and was at the club when they won their licence to play in the Super League in 2012.

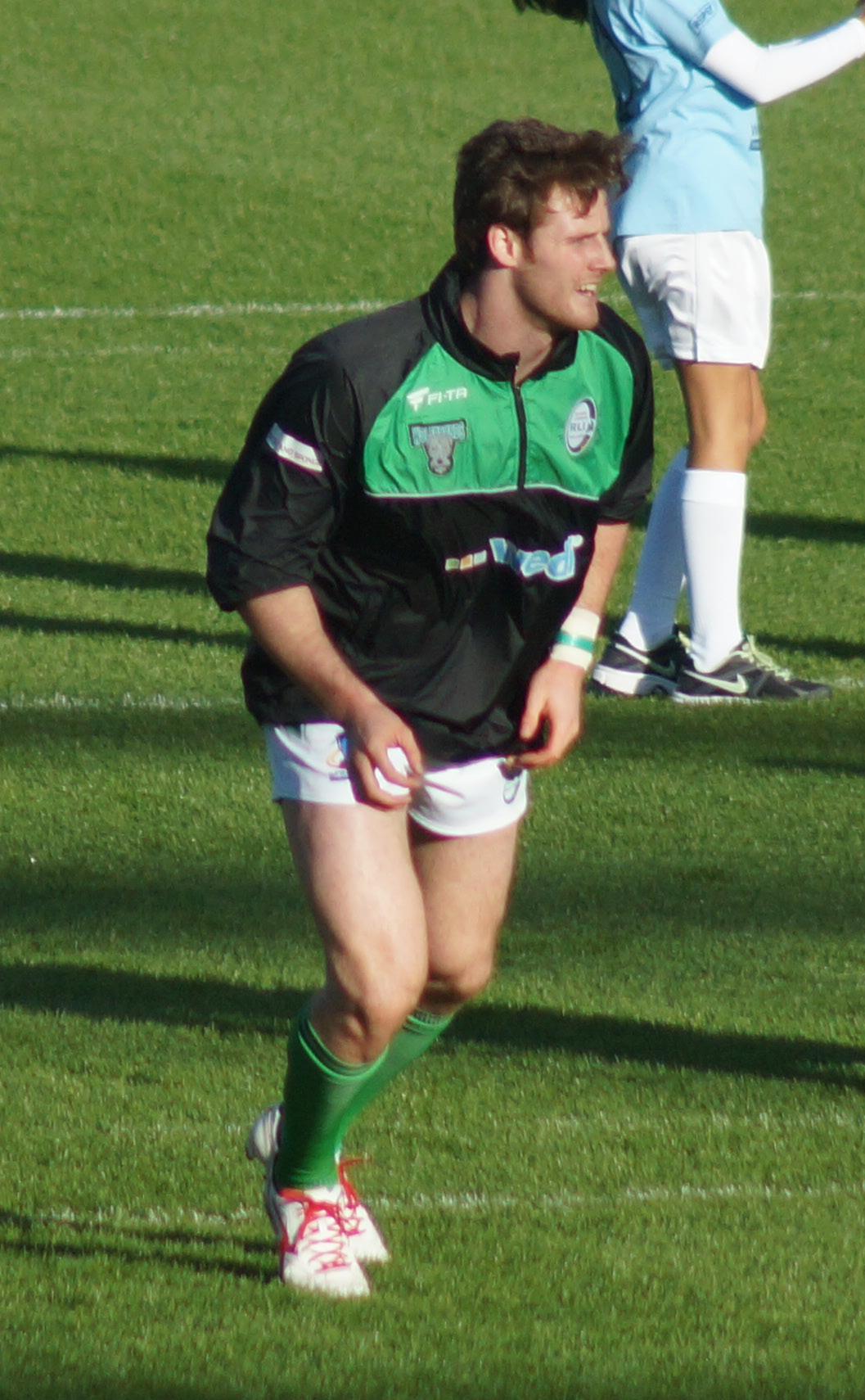
Mullally representing Ireland at the 2013 RLWC

At the end of the 2012 season after playing 17 games for the Vikings Mullally signed for Huddersfield Giants.

=== Huddersfield Giants ===
Mullally signed a three-year deal with Huddersfield in 2013. The end of his first season with West Yorkshire club saw him earn a place in Ireland's World Cup squad. At the start of the 2014 season Mullally was sent on loan to strugglers the Bradford Bulls for an initial one-month deal that was extended to a full season where he only made six appearances before they were relegated.

Mullally returned to the Huddersfield club in 2015 and continued to play for them until towards the end of the season where he was loaned to Wakefield Trinity Wildcats, and made eight appearances for them and played in the Million Pound Game. He left Huddersfield after making 41 appearances and scoring 20 times.

=== Leeds Rhinos ===
Mullally signed a three-year deal with Leeds from 2016. He made his unofficial début against New Zealand at Headingley in 2015.

Mullally played in the 2017 Super League Grand Final victory over the Castleford Tigers at Old Trafford.

=== AS Carcassonne ===
On 20 September 2020, it was reported that he had signed for AS Carcassonne in the Elite One Championship

=== Cornwall RLFC ===
On 8 December 2021, it was reported that he had signed for Cornwall RLFC in the RFL League 1

== International ==
Mullally was part of Ireland's 2013 Rugby League World Cup squad in which he featured in all three of their group games. He was also selected for the Irish 2017 World Cup squad.

== Honours ==
- Super League: 2017
- Million Pound Game: 2015,2019
