= Bodene Thompson =

NZ Maori international rugby league footballer

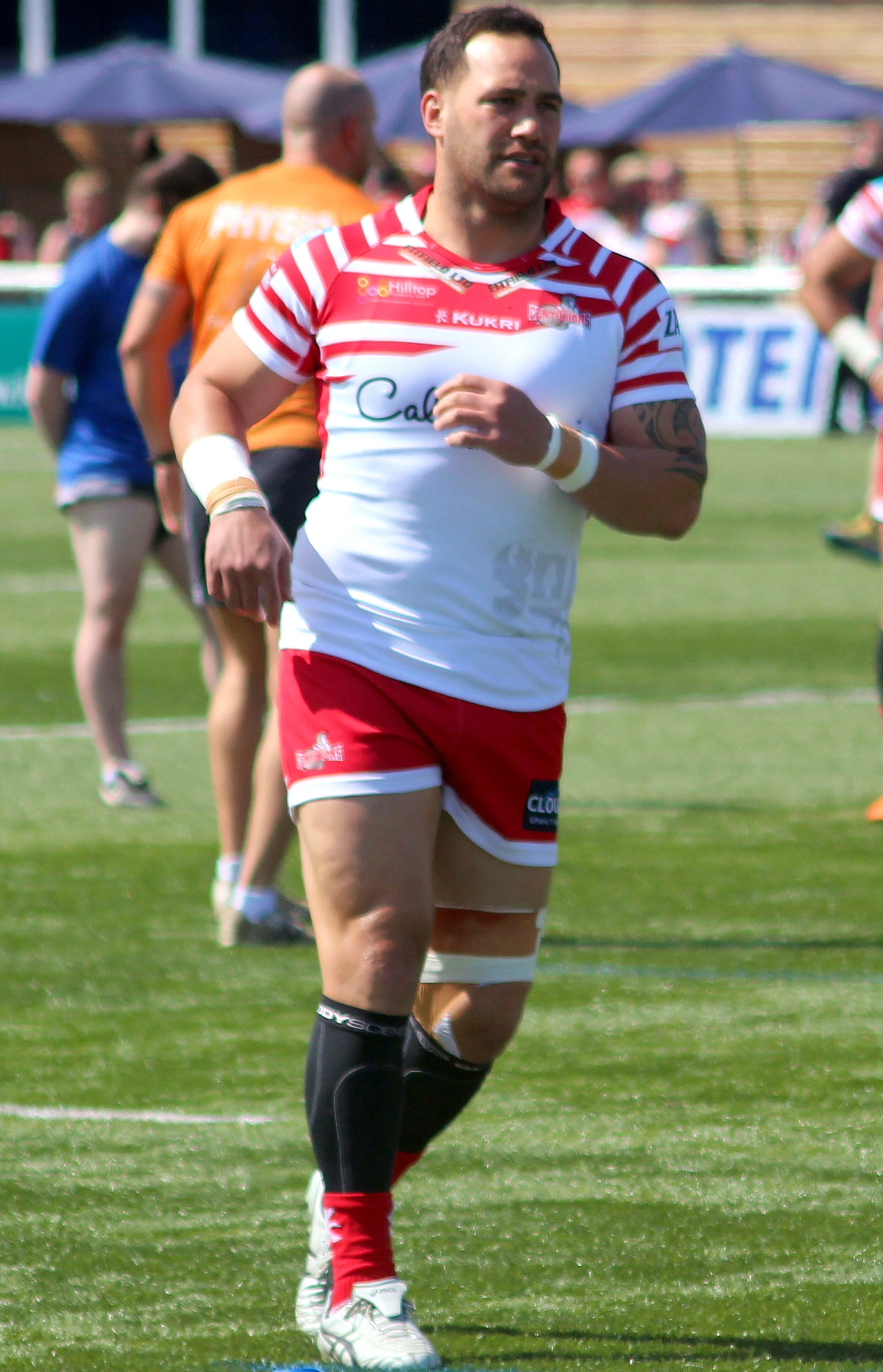

Personal information
- Full name: Bodene Kaimoana Thompson
- Born: 1 August 1988 (age 38) Tauranga, Bay Of Plenty, New Zealand
- Height: 6 ft 1 in (1.85 m)
- Weight: 16 st 12 lb (107 kg)

Playing information
- Position: Second-row, Prop, Loose forward, Centre
Club
Years	Team	Pld	T	G	FG	P
2009–12	Gold Coast Titans	50	9	0	0	36
2013–14	Wests Tigers	40	7	0	0	28
2015–17	New Zealand Warriors	58	18	0	0	72
2018	Leigh Centurions	24	4	0	0	16
2018	Warrington Wolves	7	0	0	0	0
2019–20	Toronto Wolfpack	31	5	0	0	20
2020(loan)	→ Leeds Rhinos	11	0	0	0	0
2020–22	Leeds Rhinos	37	4	0	0	16
2023	Bradford Bulls	13	1	2	0	8
	Total	271	48	2	0	196
Representative
Years	Team	Pld	T	G	FG	P
2010	New Zealand Māori	1	1	0	0	4
- Source: As of 21 June 2023

Bodene Thompson (born 1 August 1988) is a New Zealand professional rugby league footballer who last played as a second-row forward for Bradford Bulls in the RFL Championship.

He previously played for the Gold Coast Titans, Wests Tigers and the New Zealand Warriors in the NRL. Leeds Rhinos, Warrington Wolves in the Super League, Leigh Centurions in the Championship, Toronto Wolfpack in both Championship and the Super League and also spent time on loan from Toronto at Leeds in the Super League. He previously represented New Zealand Māori at international level.

== Background ==
Thompson was born in Tauranga, New Zealand. He is of Māori descent.

== Playing career ==
=== Early career ===
A Tauranga City Sharks junior, Thompson played first grade alongside his stepdad when aged only 16.

He then moved to Australia with his family and attended Keebra Park High. In 2008 he played for the Gold Coast Titans Toyota Cup (Under-20s) team.

=== Gold Coast Titans ===
Thompson made his NRL debut for the Gold Coast Titans in Round 9, 2009, making 3 appearances from the bench that year.

He made 17 appearances in 2010, including 2 semis, and signed a deal with the club that lasted until the end of the 2014 season.

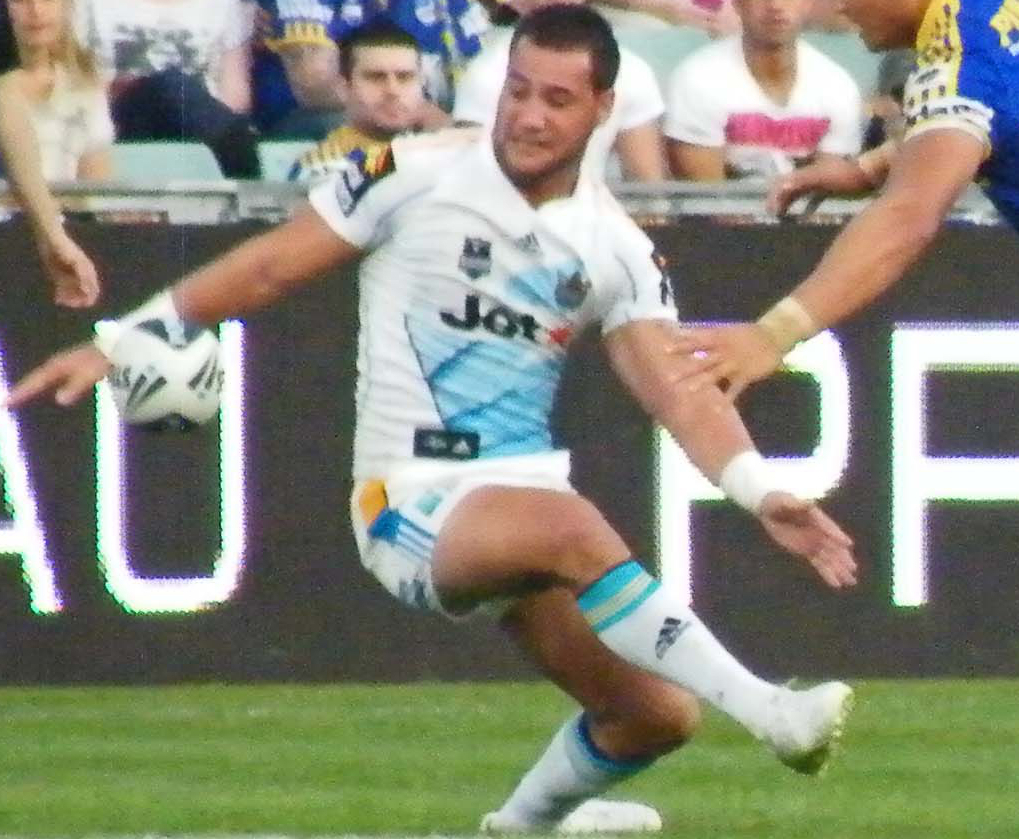
Thompson playing for the Gold Coast Titans in 2011

=== Wests Tigers ===
Thompson was released from the Titans in 2012 and signed a two-year deal with rival club Wests Tigers commencing in 2013.

Having knocked back an offer to join the Tigers in 2007, Thompson had said, "I had the (Wests Tigers) offer there (in 2007) but I'm a family man and like to be around my family. We had only just moved over so I didn't want to shoot off somewhere else as soon as we got here." Thompson felt compelled to change clubs as he was behind Greg Bird, Ashley Harrison and Nate Myles for a spot in the back-row.

Thompson played in 15 games for the Wests Tigers in 2013. He mostly played in the second-row, but finished the season in the centres.

=== New Zealand Warriors ===
On 1 November 2014, Thompson signed a 3-year contract with the New Zealand Warriors starting in 2015.

=== Leigh Centurions ===
Thompson joined the Leigh Centurions ahead of the 2018 RFL Championship season.

=== Warrington Wolves ===
He stepped up in to the European Super League and joined the Warrington Wolves in the middle of the 2018 Super League season.

He played in the 2018 Super League Grand Final defeat by the Wigan Warriors at Old Trafford.

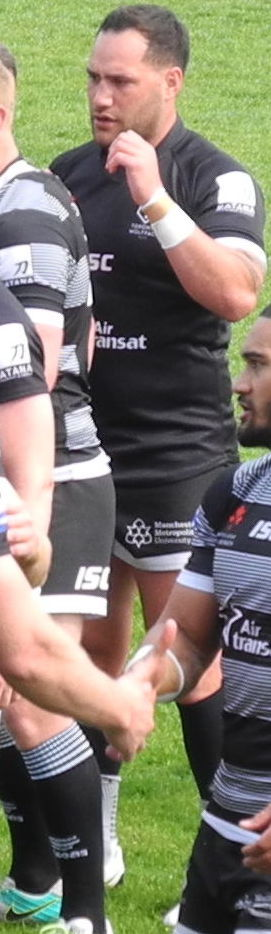
Thompson warming up for the Wolfpack in 2019

=== Toronto Wolfpack ===
Thompson dropped back down to the Championship with the Toronto Wolfpack ahead of the 2019 RFL Championship season.

He was promoted with the Wolfpack at the end of the 2019 season.

=== Leeds Rhinos loan ===
Thompson spent the last three months of the season on loan from Toronto after the Super League club experienced financial difficulties as a result of the Global Coronavirus pandemic.

=== Leeds permanent switch ===
He signed a two-year contract with Leeds ahead of the 2021 Super League season. In round 16 of the 2022 Super League season, Thompson was sent to the sin bin for a dangerous tackle during Leeds 42–12 loss against St Helens. On 24 September 2022, Thompson played for Leeds in their 24–12 loss to St Helens RFC in the 2022 Super League Grand Final.

=== Bradford Bulls ===
On 25 October 2022 it was announced that he had signed a one-year deal with Bradford.

== International career ==
Thompson played for the New Zealand Māori in 2010 against England.

He was named in the New Zealand Māori squad for a match against the New Zealand Residents on 15 October 2016.

== Controversy ==
On 2 May 2016, The New Zealand Herald reported five players were stood down from an international test match for mixing prescription drugs with energy drinks on a night out. The recipe can emulate the effect of illicit drugs. Thompson was one of the players named who was stood down alongside Manu Vatuvei, Ben Matulino, Sam Lisone and Albert Vete.

On September 11, 2017, Thompson's former partner Belinda Medlyn alleged she had group sex sessions with Thompson and his teammates. The allegations came to public knowledge after a dispute over finances to raise their child became apparent. Thompson accused Medlyn of threatening to expose the story unless he gave her $50,000.

== Boxing ==
0 Wins, 1 Loss, 0 Draws
Res.	Record	Opponent	Type	Rd., Time	Date	Location	Notes
Loss	0–1	(Australia) Paul Gallen	UD	4	2015-11-03	(New Zealand) SkyCity Convention Centre, Auckland	Professional debut.
