= Gary Wheeler (rugby league) =

English rugby league footballer

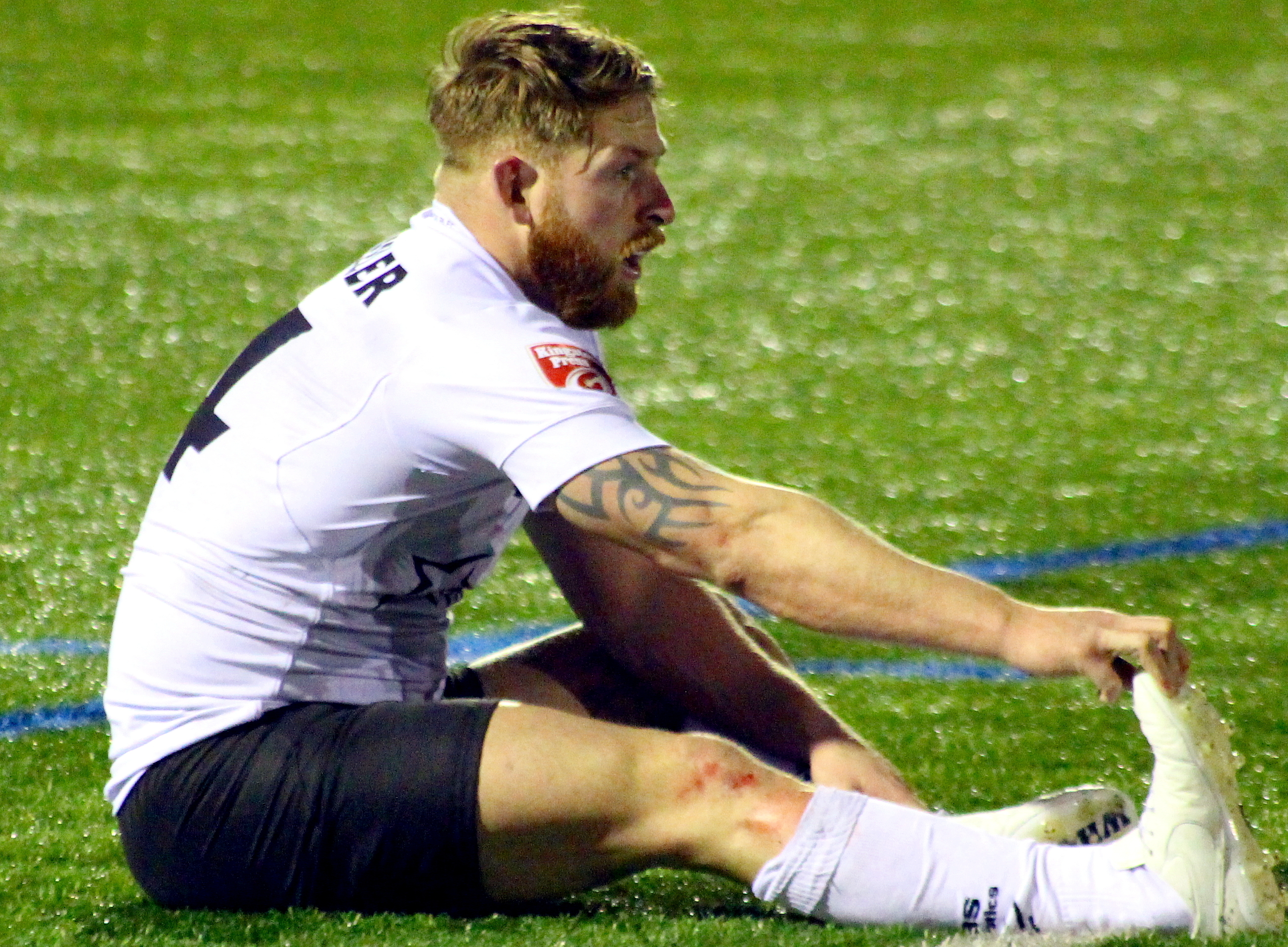

Personal information
- Full name: Gary Keith Wheeler
- Born: 30 September 1989 (age 37) St Helens, Merseyside, England
- Height: 6 ft 0 in (1.83 m)
- Weight: 14 st 4 lb (91 kg)

Playing information
- Position: Centre, Stand-off
Club
Years	Team	Pld	T	G	FG	P
2008–14	St Helens	64	22	14	0	116
2013–14	→ Rochdale Hornets	3	0	0	0	0
2015–16	Warrington Wolves	12	4	0	0	16
2015	→ North Wales Crusaders	1	0	0	0	0
2017–20	Toronto Wolfpack	29	10	0	0	40
2021–22	Barrow Raiders	11	2	0	0	8
	Total	120	38	14	0	180
Representative
Years	Team	Pld	T	G	FG	P
2012	England Knights	1	0	0	0	0
- Source: As of 27 October 2022

Gary Wheeler (born 30 September 1989) is an English professional rugby league footballer who recently retired. He last played for England at international level.

He previously played for St Helens, Warrington Wolves and Toronto Wolfpack in the Super League.

== Background ==
Wheeler was signed from Blackbrook ARLFC where he represented England at U-15 and U-16s, plus toured Australia in 2006 with the winning Saints Academy side.

== Career ==
=== St Helens ===
Wheeler made his professional début for St Helens in the Challenge Cup against the London Skolars on 20 April 2008 at Knowsley Road where St Helens won 56–0.

He played in the 2011 Super League Grand Final defeat against Leeds at Old Trafford.

=== Warrington Wolves ===
On 22 October 2014, Wheeler signed a two-year contract to play for the Warrington Wolves.

=== Toronto Wolfpack ===
On 26 July 2016, Wheeler signed a contract to play for the Toronto Wolfpack in Canada from 2017. On 10 March 2020 it was announced that Wheeler had left Toronto by mutual consent.

=== Barrow Raiders ===
On 24 June 2021 it was reported that he had signed for Barrow in the RFL League 1 On 27 October 2022, it was reported that he had left the club.

== International career ==
In 2012 he was selected to play a match for the England Knights.

In 2013 he was selected for the senior England RL squad
