= Ricky Leutele =

Samoa international rugby league footballer

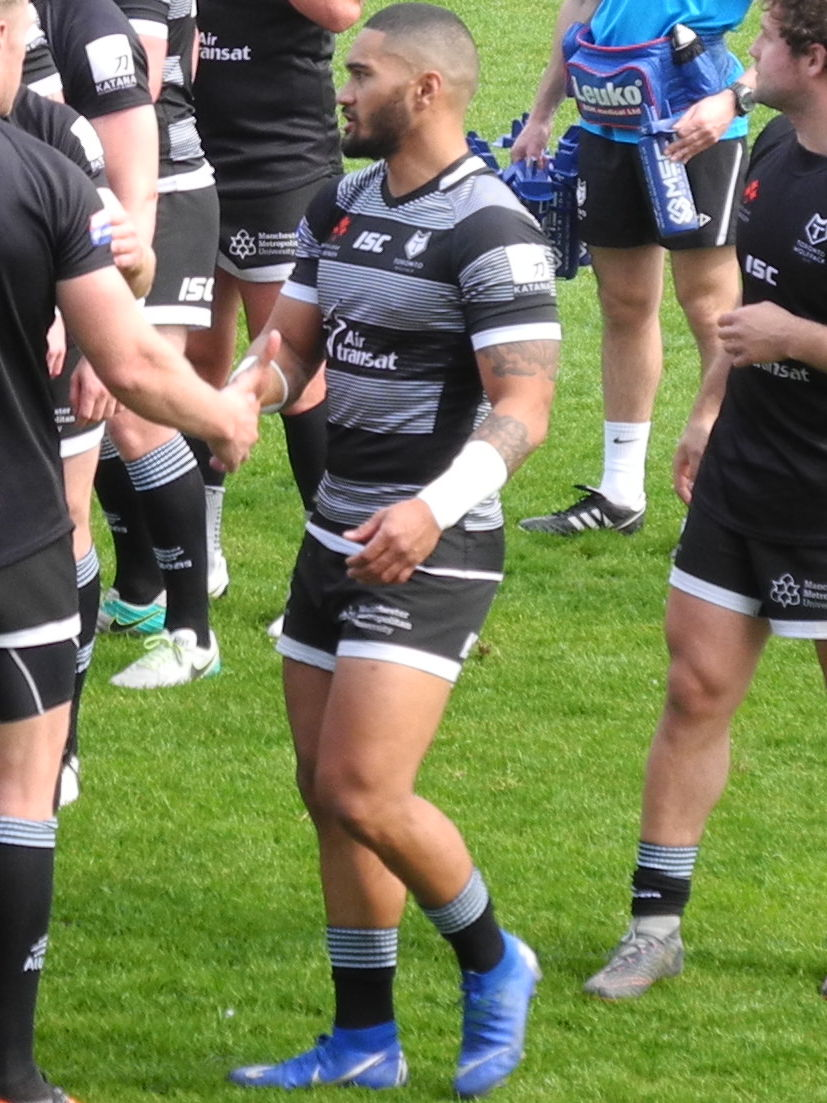

Personal information
- Full name: Ricky Samuelu Leutele
- Born: 10 April 1990 (age 36) Brisbane, Queensland, Australia
- Height: 6 ft 0 in (1.82 m)
- Weight: 14 st 11 lb (94 kg)

Playing information
- Position: Centre
Club
Years	Team	Pld	T	G	FG	P
2010–18	Cronulla Sharks	128	30	0	0	120
2019–20	Toronto Wolfpack	35	20	0	0	80
2020	Melbourne Storm	1	0	0	0	0
2021–22	Huddersfield Giants	37	20	0	0	80
2023–24	Leigh Leopards	48	15	0	0	60
	Total	249	85	0	0	340
Representative
Years	Team	Pld	T	G	FG	P
2014–17	Samoa	7	1	0	0	4
2021	Combined Nations All Stars	1	0	0	0	0
- Source: As of 26 December 2024

Ricky Leutele (born 10 April 1990) is a former Samoa international rugby league footballer who last played as a centre for the Souths Logan Magpies in the Queensland Cup.

Leutele previously played for the Huddersfield Giants in the Super League, Toronto Wolfpack in the Championship and the Super League, the Melbourne Storm and the Cronulla-Sutherland Sharks in the NRL. He was part of the Cronulla team that won their maiden premiership title in the 2016 NRL Grand Final, making the final tackle.

== Background ==
Leutele was born in Brisbane, Queensland, Australia. He is of Samoan descent, from the Leutele and Moeono family of Falefa.

Leutele played his junior rugby league for the Logan Brothers Rugby League Football Club.

Leutele is also uncle to Keenan Palasia who played for Brisbane Broncos in the 2023 NRL grand final against Penrith Panthers and later returned to his hometown to play for Gold Coast Titans. They featured for the first time together in the 2024 Toa Samoa squad in England.

== Playing career ==
Leutele played his junior football for Logan Brothers before being signed by the Cronulla-Sutherland Sharks. Leutele played for the Sharks Toyota Cup team in 2009 and 2010, scoring 5 tries in 38 games before moving on to the Sharks' NSW Cup reserve-grade team in 2011.

=== Cronulla-Sutherland Sharks: 2010 - 2018 ===
In round 24 of the 2010 NRL season, Leutele made his NRL debut for the Cronulla-Sutherland Sharks against the Melbourne Storm at centre in Cronulla's 24–4 loss at AAMI Park. This was the only match Leutele played in his debut year. In round 22 of the 2011 season, against the Gold Coast Titans, Leutele scored his first NRL try in Cronulla-Sutherland's 20–16 loss at Remondis Stadium. At the end of the season, he was named at centre in the 2011 NSW Cup Team of the Year. Leutele played in 2 matches and scored a first grade try. In July 2012, Leutele played 3 games in 6 days, playing for the NSW Residents on 4 July, the Cronulla-Sutherland Sharks NSW Cup team on 7 July and then the Sharks' NRL team on 9 July. On 12 September 2012 Leutele was again named at centre in the 2012 NSW Cup Team of the Year. Leutele played in 7 matches and scored 4 tries for the Sharks in the 2012 NRL season.

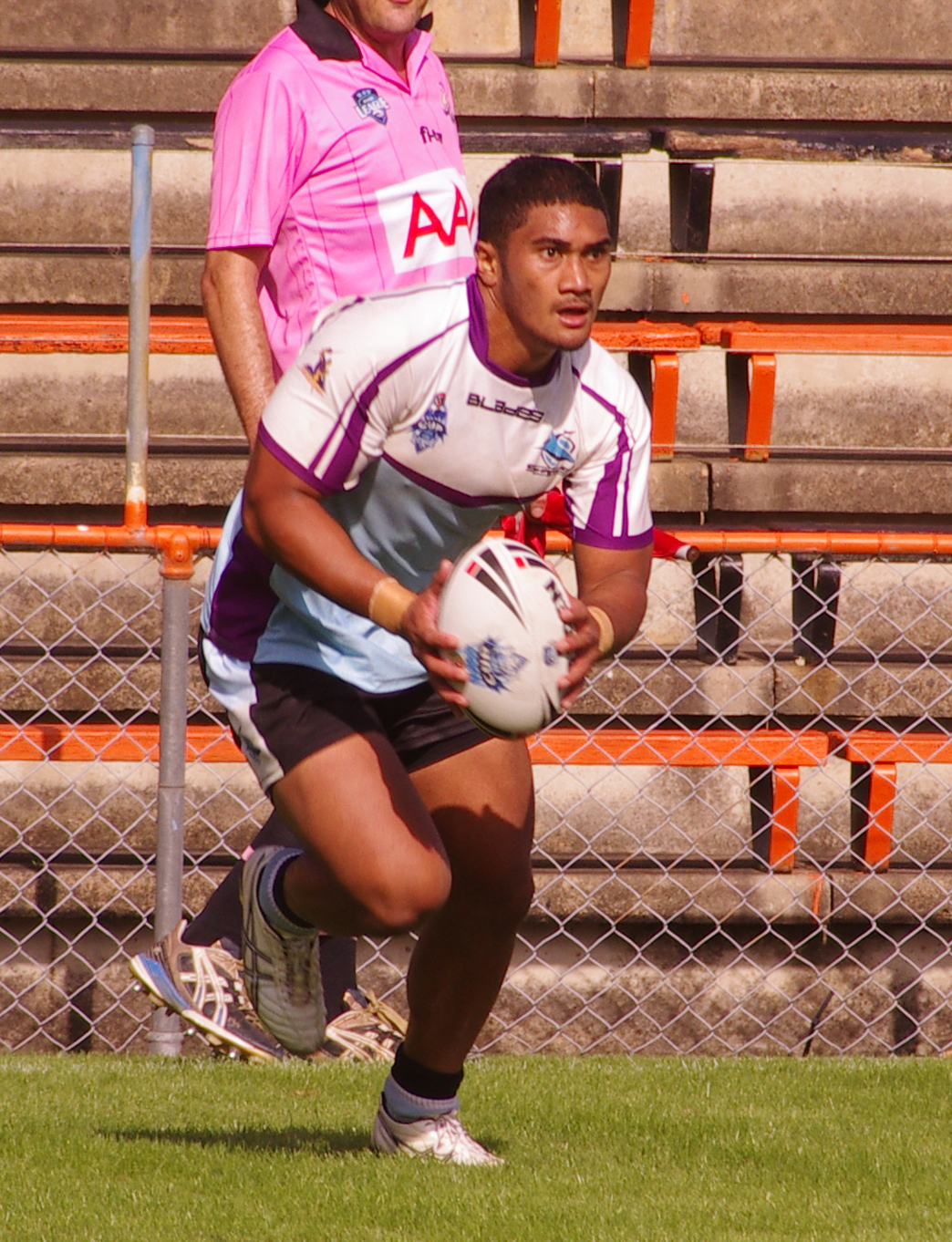
Leutele playing for the Sharks in 2012

On 25 June 2013, Leutele extended his contract with the Cronulla-Sutherland Sharks for two years till the end of the 2015 season. Leutele played in 3 matches for the season. In February 2014, Leutele was selected for the Sharks inaugural 2014 Auckland Nines squad. Leutele finished off the season with him playing in 23 matches and scoring 2 tries as Cronulla finished last on the table and claimed the wooden spoon. On 31 January and 1 February, Leutele played for the Sharks 2015 NRL Auckland Nines. On 18 August, he extended his contract with Cronulla for a further three years to the end of the 2018 season. He finished off the 2015 season having played in 23 matches and scoring 7 tries for the Sharks. On 28 January 2016, Leutele was named in the Sharks 2016 Auckland Nines squad. On 2 October he played in the club's first ever premiership victory, famously making the final tackle on Storm winger Marika Koroibete after the siren had sounded. Cronulla-Sutherland won the game 14–12 at ANZ Stadium. Leutele was part of the Cronulla side which finished 5th on the ladder at the end of the regular season. The following week, Cronulla suffered a shock finals defeat by North Queensland losing the match 15–14 at the Sydney Football Stadium. On 24 May 2018, Leutele signed a three-year deal to join the Toronto Wolfpack starting in 2019. Leutele played 25 games for Cronulla in 2018 as the club finished in the top four and reached the finals. Leutele's final game for Cronulla was the preliminary final defeat against Melbourne at AAMI Park.

=== Toronto Wolfpack: 2019 - 2020 ===
On 5 October, Leutele was part of the Toronto Wolfpack side which won the Million Pound Game against Featherstone and earned promotion to the Super League for the first time in the club's history. In mid 2020, the Toronto Wolfpack withdrew from playing in the 2020 Super League season, Leutele and his family were in a state of limbo in London as he had not been paid by the club for some months, in addition his visa had expired and so needed to leave the country.

=== Melbourne Storm: 2020 ===
On 3 August, Leutele signed a contract with Melbourne to fill the centre position for the remainder of the 2020 NRL season. Leutele made his Melbourne debut in round 20 of the 2020 NRL season against St. George Illawarra.

=== Huddersfield Giants ===
On 20 December 2020, it was announced that Leutele would join the Huddersfield Giants for the 2021 Super League season.

In round 7 of the 2021 Super League season, he scored two tries for Huddersfield in their 44-8 victory over the hapless Leigh team. In round 5 of the 2022 Super League season, he scored a hat-trick in Huddersfield's 36-24 victory over Castleford. On 28 May 2022, Leutele played for Huddersfield in their 2022 Challenge Cup Final loss to Wigan. Leutele scored the opening try in the match.

=== Leigh ===
On 20 October 2022, Leutele signed a contract to join newly promoted side Leigh. Leutele played 19 games for Leigh in the 2023 Super League season as the club finished fifth on the table and qualified for the playoffs. Leutele played 28 games for Leigh in the 2024 Super League season which saw the club finish fifth on the table.

=== Souths Logan Magpies ===
On 24 December 2024, it was announced that he would join Souths Logan Magpies in the Queensland Cup for 2025. On 29 December 2025, Leutele announced his retirement from rugby league.

=== Representative ===
On 3 May 2014, Leutele played for Samoa in the 2014 Pacific Rugby League International against Fiji at centre in Samoa's 32–16 win.

On 7 October 2014, Leutele was named in the Samoa 24-man squad for the 2014 Four Nations. Leutele played in one match for Samoa in the tournament.

On 2 May 2015, Leutele played for Samoa in their Polynesian Cup clash with Pacific rivals Tonga, playing at centre in Samoa's 18–16 win at Cbus Super Stadium.

On 7 May 2016, Leutele played for Samoa in the 2016 Polynesian Cup against Tonga, where he played at centre and scored a try in the 18–6 win at Parramatta Stadium.

On 25 June 2021 Leutele played for the Combined Nations All Stars in their 26-24 victory over England, staged at the Halliwell Jones Stadium, Warrington, as part of England’s 2021 Rugby League World Cup preparation.

== Statistics ==
Year	Team	Games	Tries	Pts
2010	Cronulla-Sutherland Sharks	1		
2011	Cronulla-Sutherland Sharks	2	1	4
2012	Cronulla-Sutherland Sharks	7	4	16
2013	Cronulla-Sutherland Sharks	3		
2014	Cronulla-Sutherland Sharks	23	2	8
2015	Cronulla-Sutherland Sharks	23	7	28
2016	Cronulla-Sutherland Sharks	19	6	24
2017	Cronulla-Sutherland Sharks	25	7	28
2018	Cronulla-Sutherland Sharks	25	3	12
2019	Toronto Wolfpack	28	18	72
2020	Toronto Wolfpack	7	2	8
2020	Melbourne Storm	1		
2021	Huddersfield Giants	14	5	20
2022	Huddersfield Giants	23	15	60
2023	Leigh Leopards	20	4	16
2024	Leigh Leopards	30	11	44
	Totals	249	85	340
