= Matty Russell =

Scotland international rugby league footballer

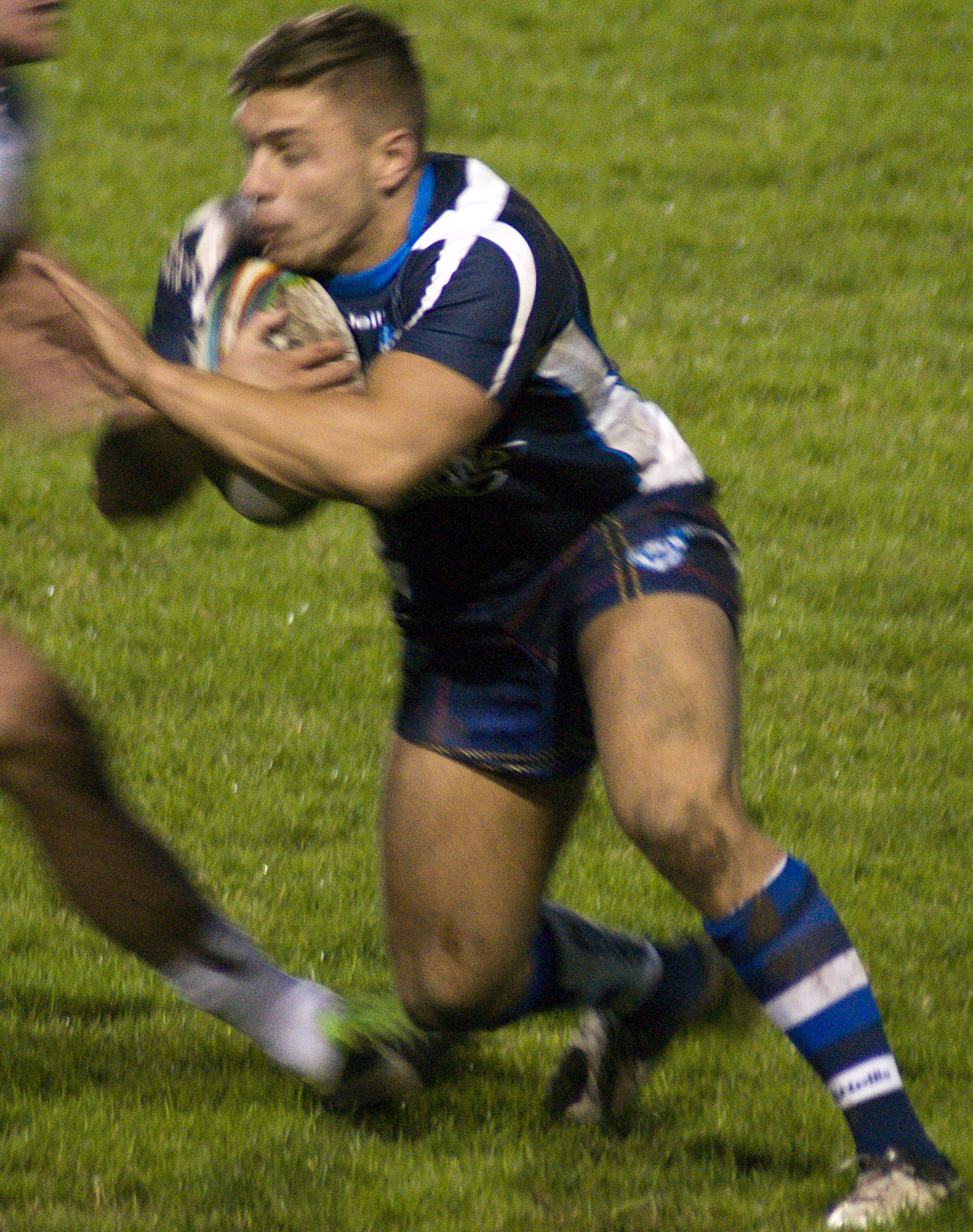

Personal information
- Full name: Matthew Russell
- Born: 6 June 1993 (age 33) Irvine, North Ayrshire, Scotland
- Height: 5 ft 11 in (1.80 m)
- Weight: 14 st 0 lb (89 kg)

Playing information
- Position: Wing, Fullback
Club
Years	Team	Pld	T	G	FG	P
2011–12	Wigan Warriors	2	3	0	0	12
2012(loan)	→ Hull F.C.	6	0	0	0	0
2013	Gold Coast Titans	0	0	0	0	0
2014–18	Warrington Wolves	96	30	0	0	120
2016(loan)	→ Swinton Lions	4	1	0	1	5
2018–20	Toronto Wolfpack	40	38	0	0	152
2021	Leigh Centurions	13	4	0	0	16
2022	Toulouse Olympique	21	13	0	0	52
2023–24	Warrington Wolves	15	3	0	0	12
2024(loan)	→ Hull F.C.	2	1	0	0	4
2024(loan)	→Leeds Rhinos	1	0	0	0	0
2025	Wakefield Trinity	7	6	0	0	24
2026	Oldham	0	0	0	0	0
2026	Catalans Dragons	2	1	0	0	4
2026	→ Saint-Estève XIII Catalan (loan)	1	0	0	0	0
	Total	210	100	0	1	401
Representative
Years	Team	Pld	T	G	FG	P
2013–	Scotland	13	5	0	0	20
- Source: As of 20 November 2026

Matthew Russell (born 6 June 1993) is a Scottish professional rugby league footballer who last played as a winger or fullback for the Catalans Dragons in the Super League and Scotland at international level.

He previously played for Wigan Warriors in the Super League, and on loan from Wigan at Hull F.C. in the top flight. Russell spent a season with the Gold Coast Titans in the NRL. He later played for Warrington Wolves in the Super League, and spent time on loan from Warrington at Swinton Lions in the Championship. Russell also played for the Toronto Wolfpack in the Championship and the top flight.

== Background ==
Russell was born in Irvine, North Ayrshire, Scotland.

== Career ==
=== Wigan Warriors ===
Russell's Super League career started with Wigan, playing some games on loan to Hull FC.

=== Gold Coast Titans ===
He then agreed a two-year deal with Australian NRL team, the Gold Coast Titans, but returned to England a season later.

=== Warrington Wolves ===
On 16 April 2014, the entertaining, fast running Scottish fullback, signed a new three-year deal that would keep him at Warrington until November 2017.

He played in the 2016 Challenge Cup Final defeat by Hull F.C. at Wembley Stadium.

He played in the 2016 Super League Grand Final defeat by Wigan at Old Trafford.

=== Toronto Wolfpack ===
He later signed a two-year deal with Championship club Toronto Wolfpack.

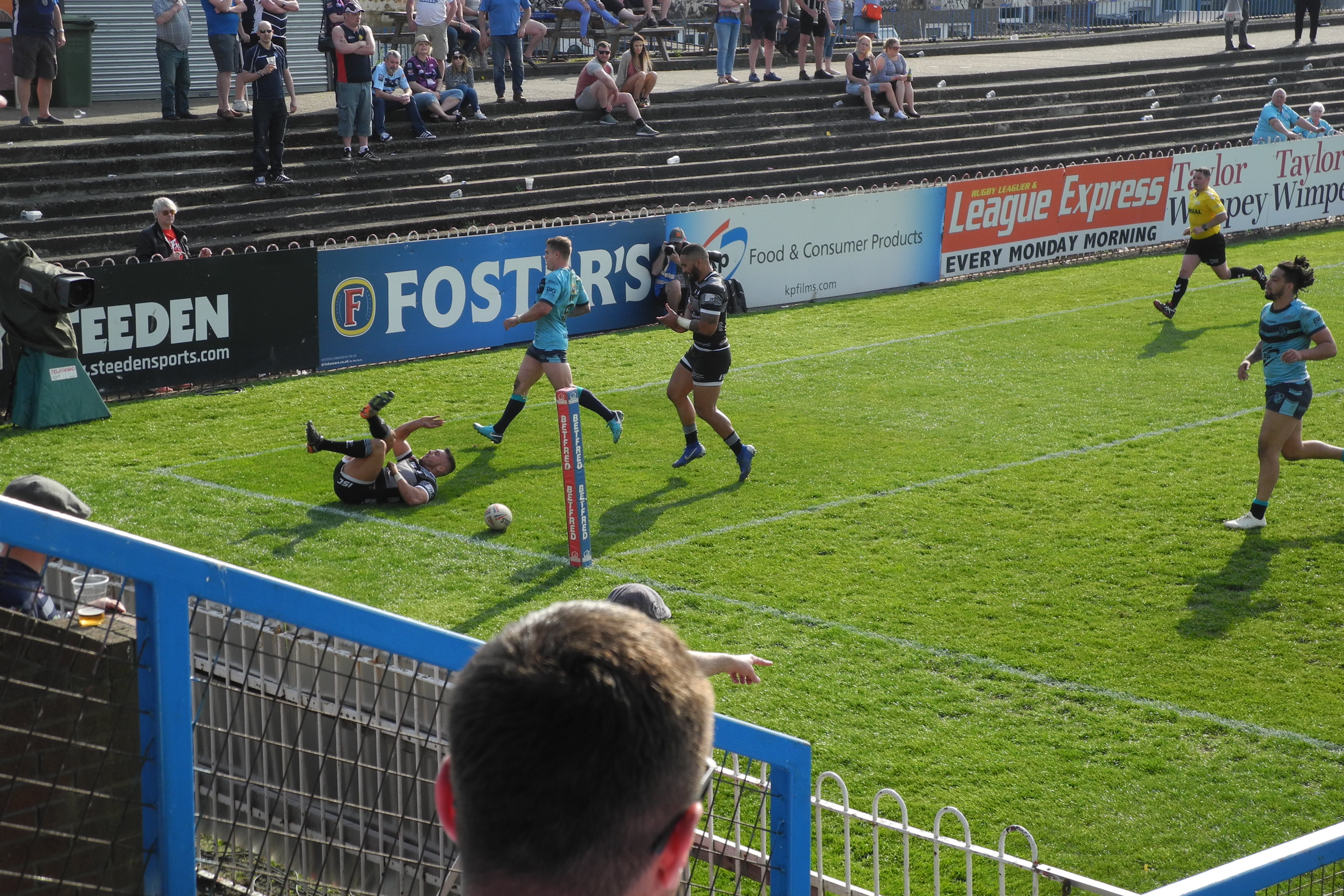
Russell scoring a try against Featherstone in 2019

=== Leigh Centurions ===
On 9 November 2020 it was announced that Russell would join Leigh for the 2021 season.

=== Toulouse Olympique ===
On 6 November 2021, it was reported that he had signed for Toulouse Olympique in the Super League In round 1 of the 2022 Super League season, Russell scored Toulouse Olympique's first ever try in the competition, however it was not enough as they were defeated 42-14 by Huddersfield.

=== Warrington Wolves (rejoin) ===
After Toulouse were relegated from the Super League, Russell signed a contract to join Warrington. Russell played 14 games for Warrington in the 2023 Super League season as Warrington finished sixth on the table and qualified for the playoffs. He played in the clubs elimination playoff loss against St Helens.

=== Hull F.C. (loan) ===
On 27 February 2024 it was reported that he had signed for Hull F.C. in the Super League on loan.

=== Leeds Rhinos (loan) ===
On 16 May 2024 it was reported that he had signed for Leeds Rhinos in the Super League on short-term loan.

=== Wakefield Trinity ===
On 30 Sep 2024 it was reported that he had signed for Wakefield Trinity in the Super League on a 1-year deal.

=== Oldham RLFC ===
On 3 December 2025 it was reported that he had signed for Oldham RLFC in the RFL Championship on a 1-year deal.

=== Catalans Dragons ===
On 13 February 2026 it was reported that he had signed for Catalans Dragons in the Super League, without playing any games for Oldham RLFC.

== International career ==
Russell was named in the Scotland squad for the 2013 Rugby League World Cup. He was one of the star players in the tournament.

In 2016, Russell was part of Scotland's Four Nations campaign, where he scored a try in their second game against England. He also played in the historic game against New Zealand, where Scotland's 18-18 draw saw them become the first 'fourth nation' to earn a point since the Four Nations series inaugurated in 2009.
