= Toronto Wolfpack =

Canadian rugby league team

Club information
- Full name: Toronto Wolfpack Rugby League Football Club
- Nickname(s): Wolfpack; The Pack
- Colours: White and black
- Founded: 2016
- Exited: 2020
- Readmitted: 2023
- Exited: 2024
- Website: https://www.torontowolfpack.com/

details
- Ground: Lamport Stadium (9,600)
- Coach: Robin Legault

Uniforms
Home colours

Toronto Wolfpack RLFC was a Canadian professional rugby league club based in Toronto, Ontario. The club was the first and only professional rugby league club in North America, and in 2023 competed in the self sponsored TWP Canada Cup, an invitational league for North American teams organised by Toronto Wolfpack.

The club originally competed in the British rugby league system but withdrew in the 2020 Super League season due to "overwhelming financial challenges" caused by the COVID-19 pandemic.

The club is the first and only North American team to play in the Rugby Football League system, making it the first transatlantic rugby league team. (Note: While they have been described as the world's first trans-Atlantic professional sports team, there are earlier examples of teams participating in trans-Atlantic competitions such as the World League of American Football, and Super Rugby.)

As of December 2025, the Wolfpack have not played any organized matches since playing in the TWP Canada Cup in 2023.

== History ==
=== 2014–2016: Origins and foundation ===
The Rugby Football League first received an application from a Canadian consortium based in Toronto, led by the chairman of the national governing body Canada Rugby League Eric Perez in 2014 to compete in the United Kingdom's third tier of professional rugby league. Perez was denied permission to join the first-tier Super League directly, and instead attempted to build the club up to the point where it could be promoted. A press conference was held on 27 April 2016 at which details about the franchise, which began play in 2017, were revealed. The team was the first professional rugby league team to be based in Canada. A group of 10 businessmen, consisting of mostly Canadians and Australian mining millionaire David Argyle, owned the club, having paid around $500,000 to be granted admission to the rugby league. A condition for the team to join the British rugby league system was that they would be responsible for covering travel and accommodation expenses incurred for all visiting teams outside of the first division Super League.

It was suggested that Toronto was an attractive market as Canada has the most rugby league followers outside of Australia, France, New Zealand and the United Kingdom. The club planned to play in blocks of four home matches, four away matches, and cover all expenses for visiting teams throughout the season.

The Wolfpack held tryouts in five cities across North America starting 24 September: Philadelphia, Tampa, Kingston (Jamaica), Vancouver, and Toronto itself. From these tryouts 18 athletes were selected to take part in a tour in England, culminating in a victorious game against an amateur club, the Brighouse Rangers. Three players won professional contracts with the Wolfpack Rugby League Team following the tour, with another round of tryouts to be held in Toronto in the following few months for the unsuccessful trialists.

The Toronto Wolfpack Rugby League Team owned the rights to all broadcasts of their matches. In Canada, games were broadcast on CBC Live and on Game TV, in the USA games were broadcast on Eleven Sports, and in the UK and Ireland Premier Sports broadcast through the Sky Network.

=== 2017–2020: Seasons in the British leagues ===
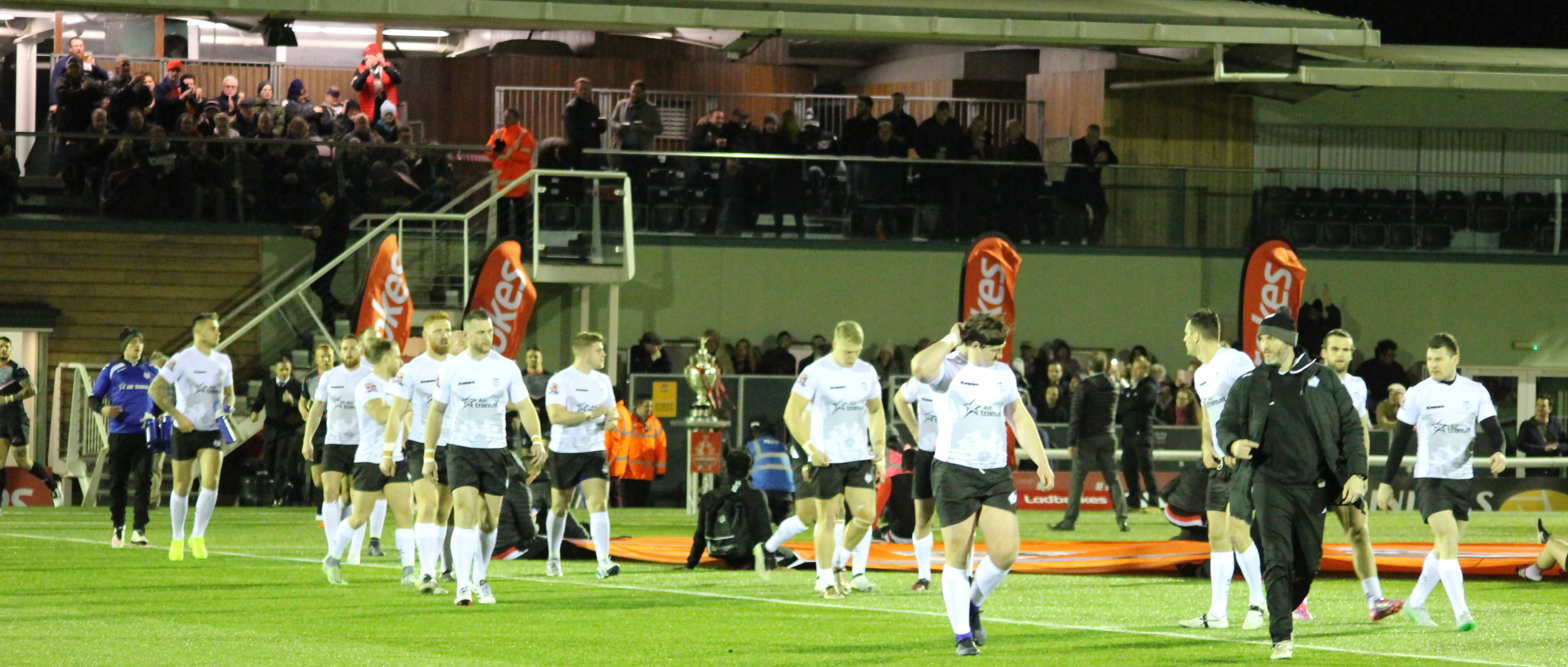
The Toronto Wolfpack taking the field against the London Broncos in the Challenge Cup at the Trailfinders Sports Ground in Ealing in March 2017

On 22 January 2017, the Wolfpack played their first professional game, a pre-season friendly against Hull F.C. at the KCOM Stadium. The final score was 26–20 in favour of Hull. The club played its first competitive match on February 25, 2017, resulting in a 14–6 victory in the third round of the Challenge Cup against the amateur NCL champions: Siddal.

On 4 March, Toronto played its first League 1 match, away at London Skolars. They won the match 76–0. Their first home match was played on May 6, where they defeated Oxford in front of 6,281 fans at Lamport Stadium.

The Wolfpack would go on to have a successful campaign, winning all fifteen of their regular season matches and five out of seven playoff games. The Wolfpack finished the season with 41 points from 22 games and points difference of +921.

Promotion to the Championship, and the Kingston Press League 1 Title, was secured on 9 September 2017 with the Wolfpack defeating Barrow Raiders 26–2 in front of 7,972 spectators. They closed with a win against Doncaster in front of a record attendance of 8,456.

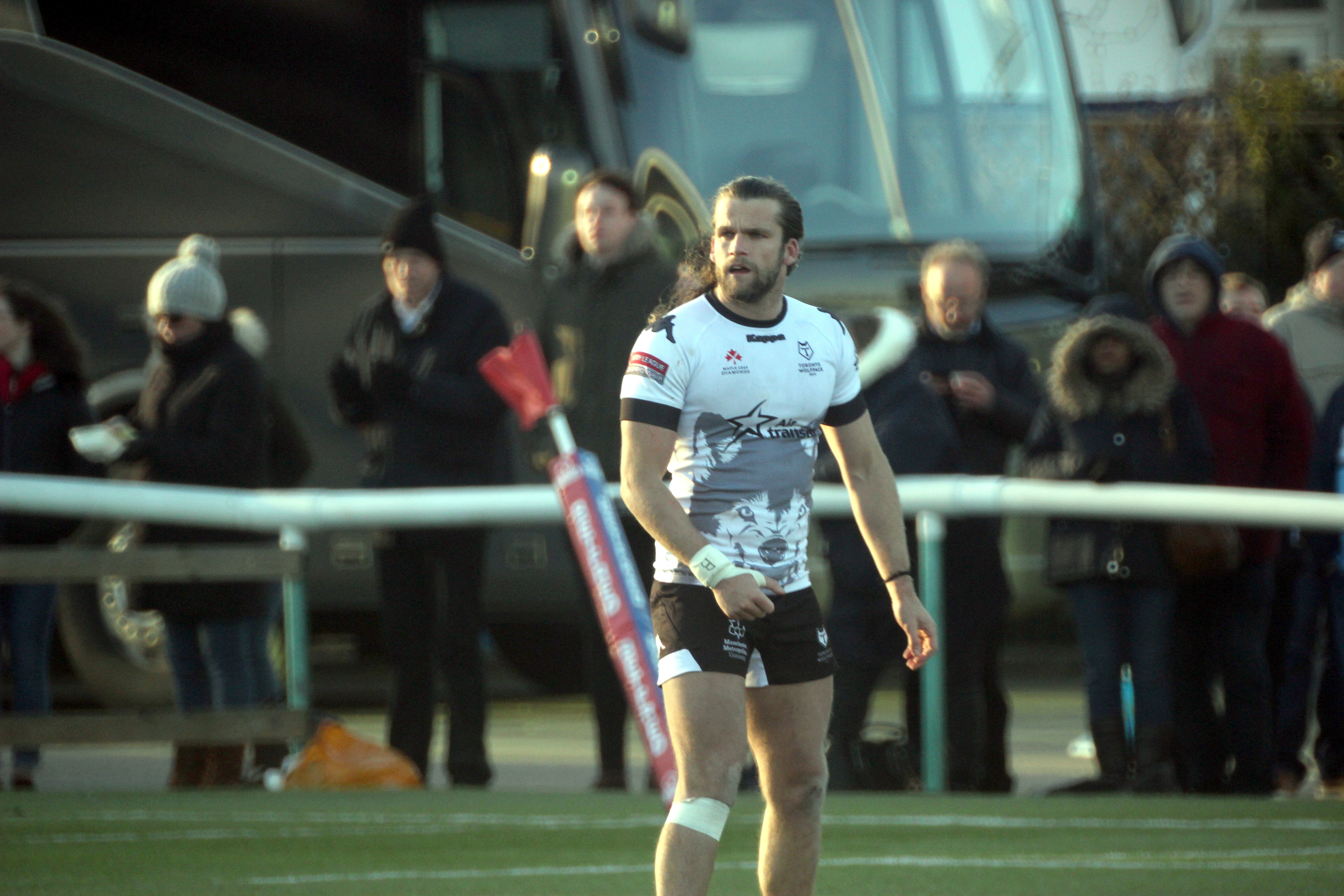
Liam Kay with the Wolfpack during a match in February 2018

The following season saw continued success by the Wolfpack; winning the league leaders shield in the championship competition. Following a round 4 defeat to London Broncos they put together an 18-game winning streak from March 2018 which was eventually broken with a home defeat to Featherstone Rovers in late July. They performed creditably in the Super 8s with five wins from seven games, defeating Super League sides Widnes Vikings and Leeds Rhinos. However, they fell short of automatic promotion on points difference and London Broncos beat the Wolfpack 4–2 at Lamport Stadium in the Million Pound Game, condemning the Wolfpack to another season in the Championship.

On October 5, 2019, the Wolfpack were promoted to Super League for the first time in club history after their 24–6 victory over Featherstone Rovers in the 2019 Million Pound Game.

In November 2019, the Wolfpack made international headlines when they signed dual-code international Sonny Bill Williams on a two-year deal. The signing came in the wake of Williams' third appearance in a Rugby World Cup and saw him return to Rugby League, the sport where his career began.

=== 2020-2022: RFL expulsion and revival into the NARL ===
In July 2020, Toronto Wolfpack withdrew from the 2020 Super League due to financial difficulties and new logistics needed for international travel caused by the COVID-19 pandemic in the United Kingdom.

The club was given a chance to resubmit a bid for a place in the 2021 Super League season but the bid for readmission was rejected on 2 November 2020 resulting in the team's removal from the league. Subsequently, the Wolfpack made an announcement that they would cease operations. Following the vote, a consortium of potential new owners led by Carlo LiVolsi backed out of a deal to purchase the Wolfpack from financially struggling owner David Argyle. Consequently, it was announced in November 2020 that the team would cease operations.

On 31 March 2021, it was announced that a private investor group had purchased the Wolfpack and that they would be resuming play in the newly formed North American Rugby League. The team played their only game under the NARL, the Canada Cup, in September 2021, originally announced to be played against the Ottawa Aces, the game was instead played against DC Cavalry.

=== 2023: TWP Canada Cup ===
On 20 June 2023, Wolfpack announced they would be withdrawing from the NARL to start their own competition, the self sponsored Canada Cup, after no NARL seasons had actually occurred.

As the only professional club in North America, the TWP Canada Cup, is fully organised and ran by Toronto Wolfpack, and is an invitational league. Games originally scheduled against Southwest Florida Copperheads, Canada All Stars, Washington DC Cavalry and Jacksonville Axemen were cancelled.

==== 2023 season ====
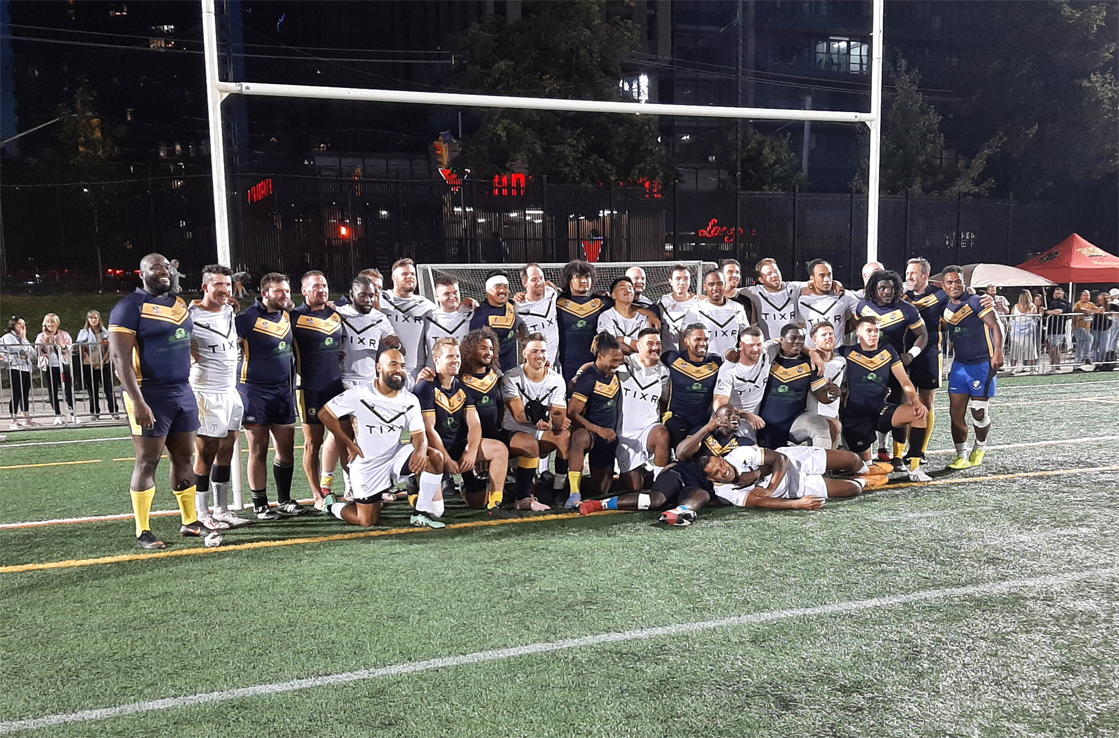
Wolfpack players pose with Brooklyn Kings players after their match on September 16, 2023

Date	Club	Score v Toronto (A-F)
August 12	(Canada) Whistler Wolves	6–60
August 19	(United States) Atlanta Rhinos	4–88
September 2	(United States) Boston Thirteens (Note: Not an original invitee)	10–66
September 16	(United States) Brooklyn Kings	26–30
September 23	(United States) Tampa Mayhem	12–50
October 7	Jamaica Hurricanes	6–50

=== 2024–present ===
On September 10, 2024, the Wolfpack released an open letter to their fans stating that, "After exploring multiple options for the 2024 season, we decided to forego playing this season to plan for a 2025 season."

As of December 2025, the Wolfpack have not played any organized matches since playing in the TWP Canada Cup in 2023.

== Stadium ==
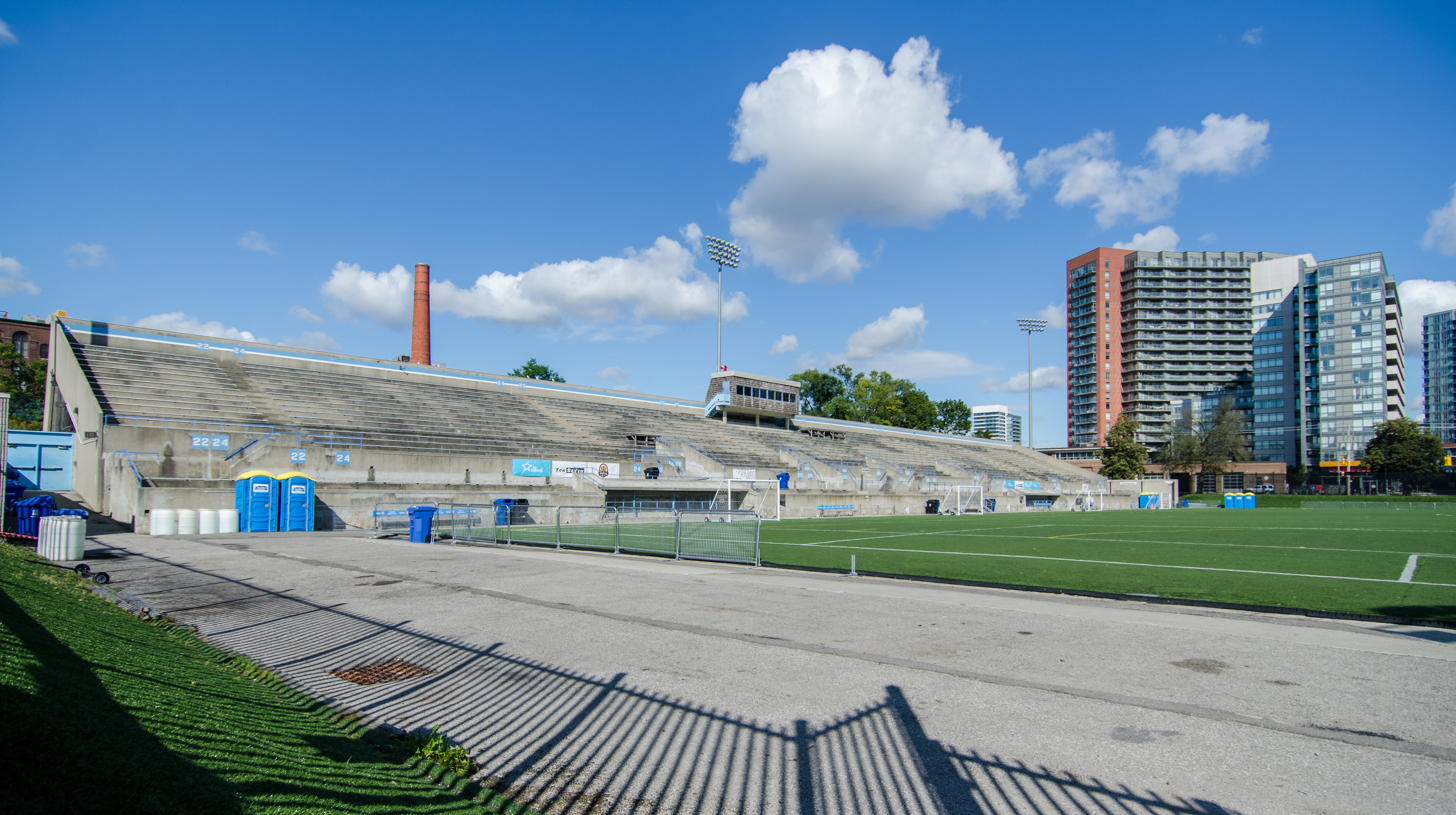
Lamport Stadium based in the Liberty Village neighbourhood of Toronto.

The team's home stadium is Lamport Stadium in Toronto and known as The Den for Wolfpack matches. The stadium seats 9,600. The stadium was opened in 1975 and has an artificial field. In addition to the two rugby codes, it has hosted soccer and lacrosse. The team signed a three-year lease to play at the stadium. The Toronto Wolfpack supporters group can be found in Section 35.

Lamport Stadium has been used by the team for nearly all their home games in Canada. However, during their 2018 season the Wolfpack relocated one of their home games to Fletcher's Fields in Markham, as Lamport Stadium was undergoing field resurfacing work. The team explored options to improve the home stadium, including holding preliminary discussions about moving their home games to BMO Field, renovating Lamport Stadium or building a new stadium.

In addition to home games played in Greater Toronto Area, the team played a "home game" at New River Stadium in London for the 2018, and 2019 seasons. The Wolfpack played at these venues in an effort to boost the popularity of the team, and sport in London. Additionally, in their debut Super League campaign in 2020 the Wolfpack hosted scheduled "home" games on the road at neutral venues, due to the weather conditions not being suitable in Eastern Canada for rugby league until April. Toronto played scheduled "home" games at: Headingley Stadium, Leeds as a double header with Leeds Rhinos; the Halliwell Jones Stadium, Warrington; and Bootham Crescent, York as a double header with York City Knights. The York game was originally scheduled to be at the new York Community Stadium, as the grounds' inaugural game, however the stadium was not ready in time.

== Logistics ==
The team stays at the George Brown College residence in West Don Lands that is the former site of the 2015 Pan American Games Athletes' Village and trains at Lamport Stadium. Away teams stay at York University residence and train on York University athletic facilities. Through a sponsorship deal with Air Transat, the team covers the travel and accommodation cost for all of the away teams. Toronto Wolfpack continued to cover expenses for the visiting teams in the 2018 season.

Toronto signed an agreement with Brighouse Rangers to share their training ground for pre-seasons and while the Wolfpack are in the UK for away fixtures for 2017. At the end of the 2017 season the Wolfpack confirmed their intention to switch to a base in Manchester, UK, during the 2018 season, and in 2018 announced the deepening of their partnership with Manchester Metropolitan University and its community. Until 2020, Manchester served as the Wolfpack's home in the United Kingdom, with the club training at Hopwood Hall College.

== Media and promotion ==
Toronto Wolfpack games were broadcast on Canadian specialty channel GameTV, with further digital rights extended to CBC Sports with games streamed on the CBC Sports website. Matches are also archived on the Toronto Wolfpack YouTube Channel.

All Toronto Wolfpack games were broadcast live in the UK on Sky Sports - Arena which reaches 11 million homes across the Sky Network. In the USA Eleven Sports send broadcasts into 50 million homes.

All 2023 Canada Games were available on Wolfpacks own channel Howl TV.

== Kit sponsors and manufacturers ==
Year	Kit Manufacturer	Main Shirt Sponsor
2017–2018	Kappa	Air Transat
2019	ISC	Air Transat
2020	BLK	Rugby Strength
2023	Macron Canada	TIXR

== Records ==
=== Individual ===
- Most tries in a match:

- 5:

Liam Kay v. York City Knights (1 July 2017)

- Most goals in a match:

- 13:

Craig Hall v. Doncaster (9 April 2017)

- Most points in a match:

- 38:

Craig Hall v. Hemel Stags (15 July 2017)

- Most drop goals in a season:

- 2 (2 players):

Ryan Brierley and Gareth O'Brien (2018 Championship)

- Most goals in a season:

- 170:

Craig Hall (2017 League 1)

- Most tries in a season:

- 27 (2 players):

Liam Kay (2017 League 1) and Matty Russell (2019 Championship)

- Most points in a season:

- 436:

Craig Hall (2017 League 1)

=== Team records ===
- Biggest win:

88-4v. (United States) Atlanta Rhinos (Aug 19, 2023)

82–6 v. Doncaster (April 9, 2017)

- Biggest loss:

66-10 v. Warrington Wolves (May 13, 2018)

=== Attendance records ===
- Highest home attendance:

9,974 v. Featherstone Rovers (at Lamport Stadium, 5 October 2019)

== Seasons ==
(United Kingdom) British rugby league system

Season	League										Play-offs	(United Kingdom) Challenge Cup	Name	Tries	Name	Points
Season	Division	P	W	D	L	F	A	Dif	Pts	Pos	Play-offs	(United Kingdom) Challenge Cup	Top try scorer		Top point scorer	
2017	League 1	22	20	1	1	1164	243	+921	41	1st	None (Note: Teams do not enter League 1 playoffs if league leaders)	R5	Liam Kay	27	Craig Hall	436
2018	Championship	23	20	1	2	866	374	+492	41	1st	Lost in Final	R6	Liam Kay	26	Ryan Brierley	214
2019	Championship	27	26	0	1	1010	356	+654	52	1st	Won in Final	Did not participate	Matty Russell	27	Gareth O'Brien	278
2020	Super League	Withdrew from competition; all results expunged. (Note: On 20 July 2020, Toronto Wolfpack withdrew from the 2020 Super League due to financial difficulties and new logistics needed for international travel due to the COVID-19 pandemic. The RFL announced there would be no relegation from the competition.)										R6	Three players (Note: Matty Russell, Ricky Leutele, and Gary Wheeler)	2	Gareth O'Brien	18

(United States) (Canada) North American Rugby League

Season	League										Play-offs	Canada Cup	Name	Tries	Name	Points
Season	Division	P	W	D	L	F	A	Dif	Pts	Pos	Play-offs	Canada Cup	Top try scorer		Top point scorer	
2021	Eastern Conference	League abandoned due to the COVID-19 pandemic										W	Blake Mahovic	2	Nathan Roberts	8
2022	Eastern Conference	Competition did not occur for unknown reasons											N/A			

Toronto Wolfpack Canada Cup

Season	Result	Name	Tries	Name	Points
Season	Result	Top try scorer		Top point scorer	
2023	W	Unknown	Unknown	Unknown	Unknown

== Honours ==
(United Kingdom) RFL

- RFL Championship

Winners (2): 2018, 2019
Million Pound Game

Winners (1): 2019
Runners-up (1): 2018

RFL Championship Leaders' Shield

Winners (2): 2018, 2019

- RFL League 1

Winners (1): 2017

(United States) (Canada) NARL

- Canada Cup

Winners (1): 2021

TWP Canada Cup

Winners (1): 2023

== See also ==
- Canada national rugby league team
- Canada Rugby League
- Ontario Rugby League
- Ottawa Aces
- Rugby league in Canada
- Rugby Football League expansion
