= 2018 RFL Championship season results =

The Championship is the second-tier rugby league competition in the United Kingdom. The 2018 season began on 2 February.

The regular season was played over 23 round-robin fixtures, where each of the twelve teams involved in the competition played each other twice, once at home and once away. Teams also played one extra match on the Summer Bash Weekend.

The play-offs commenced after the round-robin fixtures. The top four teams in the Championship qualified for "The Qualifiers", along with the bottom four teams in the Super League. Each team's points totals were reset to zero and each team played against each other once. The top three teams qualified automatically for the Super League in 2019, the fourth and fifth-placed teams contested the "Million Pound Game" at the venue of the fourth-placed team, with the winner also earning a place in the Super League for 2019, while the losing team and the bottom three teams entered the Championship in 2019.

The fifth-twelfth placed teams in the Championship in 2018 contested the "Championship Shield", where each team played seven extra games, retaining their original points. The top four teams contested play-offs, with the first-placed team facing the fourth-placed team and the second-placed team facing the third-placed team; The two winning teams then contested the Championship Shield Grand Final. As the Championship was expanding to 14 teams in the 2019 season, the bottom team was not automatically relegated to League 1 in 2019, instead they faced the losing finalist in the League 1 promotion final in a play-off.

== Regular season ==
All times are UK local time (UTC or UTC+1) on the relevant dates.

=== Round 1 ===
Home	Score	Away	Match Information
Home	Score	Away	Date and Time	Venue	Referee	Attendance	Report
Dewsbury Rams	20–18	Sheffield Eagles	2 February, 19:45	Tetley's Stadium	Greg Dolan	808
Toulouse Olympique	46–14	Swinton Lions	3 February, 14:00	Stade Ernest-Argelès	Tom Grant	1,740
Featherstone Rovers	20–4	Halifax	4 February, 15:00	LD Nutrition Stadium	Gareth Hewer	2,743
Leigh Centurions	12–34	Toronto Wolfpack	4 February, 15:00	Leigh Sports Village	Liam Moore	5,452
London Broncos	56–12	Barrow Raiders	4 February, 15:00	Trailfinders Sports Ground	John McMullen	801
Rochdale Hornets	10–48	Batley Bulldogs	12 May, 15:00^{A}	Crown Oil Arena	Liam Stavely	500

=== Round 2 ===
Home	Score	Away	Match Information
Home	Score	Away	Date and Time	Venue	Referee	Attendance	Report
Barrow Raiders	8–8	Toronto Wolfpack	11 February, 15:00	The JF Hornby Stadium	Gareth Hewer	1,266
Dewsbury Rams	0–12	London Broncos	11 February, 15:00	Tetley's Stadium	Tom Crashley	795
Featherstone Rovers	36–18	Toulouse Olympique	11 February, 15:00	LD Nutrition Stadium	Scott Mikalauskas	2,033
Halifax	30–10	Sheffield Eagles	11 February, 15:00	The MBi Shay	John McMullen	1,513
Leigh Centurions	34–6	Batley Bulldogs	11 February, 15:00	Leigh Sports Village	Greg Dolan	3,216
Swinton Lions	18–25	Rochdale Hornets	3 June, 15:00^{A}	Heywood Road	Tom Grant	631

=== Round 3 ===
Home	Score	Away	Match Information
Home	Score	Away	Date and Time	Venue	Referee	Attendance	Report
Toulouse Olympique	50–6	Sheffield Eagles	17 February, 16:00	Stade Ernest-Argelès	Liam Moore	1,533
Barrow Raiders	24–20	Leigh Centurions	18 February, 15:00	The JF Hornby Stadium	John McMullen	1,991
Halifax	6–20	Toronto Wolfpack	18 February, 15:00	The MBi Shay	Jack Smith	2,036
London Broncos	44–24	Featherstone Rovers	18 February, 15:00	Trailfinders Sports Ground	Tom Grant	1,085
Swinton Lions	28–48	Batley Bulldogs	18 February, 15:00	AJ Bell Stadium	Gareth Hewer	588
Rochdale Hornets	6–38	Dewsbury Rams	19 February, 19:45	Crown Oil Arena	Nick Bennett	427

=== Round 4 ===
Home	Score	Away	Match Information
Home	Score	Away	Date and Time	Venue	Referee	Attendance	Report
Batley Bulldogs	32–12	Barrow Raiders	25 February, 15:00	Fox's Biscuits Stadium	Greg Dolan	657
Dewsbury Rams	20–0	Swinton Lions	25 February, 15:00	Tetley's Stadium	Johnny Roberts	961
Featherstone Rovers	58–14	Sheffield Eagles	25 February, 15:00	LD Nutrition Stadium	John McMullen	2,048
London Broncos	47–16	Toronto Wolfpack	25 February, 15:00	Trailfinders Sports Ground	Matthew Rossleigh	1,205
Rochdale Hornets	20–26	Halifax	25 February, 15:00	Crown Oil Arena	Tom Grant	703
Leigh Centurions	26–32	Toulouse Olympique	25 February, 17:30	Leigh Sports Village	Jack Smith	3,143

=== Round 5 ===
Home	Score	Away	Match Information
Home	Score	Away	Date and Time	Venue	Referee	Attendance	Report
Toulouse Olympique	54–6	Rochdale Hornets	3 March, 16:00	Stade Ernest-Argelès	Matthew Rossleigh	1,747
Barrow Raiders	58–32	Dewsbury Rams	13 May, 15:00^{B}	The JF Hornby Stadium	John McMullen	1,061
Batley Bulldogs	18–32	Halifax	2 June, 15:00^{B}	Fox's Biscuits Stadium	John McMullen	1,002
Leigh Centurions	30–38	Featherstone Rovers	4 March, 15:00	Leigh Sports Village	Chris Kendall	3,594
Sheffield Eagles	14–66	London Broncos	13 May, 15:00^{B}	Sheffield Olympic Legacy Stadium	Tom Grant	517
Swinton Lions	12–52	Toronto Wolfpack	4 March, 15:00	Heywood Road	Jack Smith	701

=== Round 6 ===
Home	Score	Away	Match Information
Home	Score	Away	Date and Time	Venue	Referee	Attendance	Report
Dewsbury Rams	20–40	Toulouse Olympique	11 March, 15:00	Tetley's Stadium	Jack Smith	720
Featherstone Rovers	32–18	Swinton Lions	11 March, 15:00	LD Nutrition Stadium	Tom Grant	2,082
Halifax	38–18	Leigh Centurions	11 March, 15:00	The MBi Shay	Gareth Hewer	2,119
London Broncos	68–12	Batley Bulldogs	11 March, 15:00	Trailfinders Sports Ground	John McMullen	Est. 1,200
Rochdale Hornets	24–12	Barrow Raiders	11 March, 15:00	Crown Oil Arena	Matthew Rossleigh	414
Sheffield Eagles	10–44	Toronto Wolfpack	11 March, 15:00	Sheffield Olympic Legacy Stadium	Greg Dolan	863

=== Round 7 ===
Home	Score	Away	Match Information
Home	Score	Away	Date and Time	Venue	Referee	Attendance	Report
Rochdale Hornets	17–18	Toronto Wolfpack	23 March, 19:45	Crown Oil Arena	Matthew Rossleigh	504
Toulouse Olympique	38–6	Halifax	24 March, 17:00	Stade Ernest-Argelès	John McMullen	2,137
Barrow Raiders	36–22	Sheffield Eagles	25 March, 15:00	The JF Hornby Stadium	Marcus Griffiths	1,210
Batley Bulldogs	14–40	Featherstone Rovers	25 March, 15:00	Fox's Biscuits Stadium	Nick Bennett	1,273
Leigh Centurions	36–0	Dewsbury Rams	25 March, 15:00	Leigh Sports Village	Gareth Hewer	3,136
Swinton Lions	18–64	London Broncos	25 March, 15:00	Heywood Road	Liam Stavely	518

=== Round 8 ===
Home	Score	Away	Match Information
Home	Score	Away	Date and Time	Venue	Referee	Attendance	Report
London Broncos	16–36	Toulouse Olympique	30 March, 13:00	Trailfinders Sports Ground	Matthew Rossleigh	891
Sheffield Eagles	38–20	Rochdale Hornets	30 March, 15:00	Sheffield Olympic Legacy Stadium	Tom Grant	516
Swinton Lions	10–40	Leigh Centurions	30 March, 15:00	Heywood Road	Greg Dolan	1,345
Featherstone Rovers	16–24	Toronto Wolfpack	30 March, 18:00	LD Nutrition Stadium	Marcus Griffiths	3,121
Batley Bulldogs	18–10	Dewsbury Rams	30 March, 18:30	Fox's Biscuits Stadium	Tom Crashley	1,117
Halifax	30–4	Barrow Raiders	30 March, 19:30	The MBi Shay	Liam Stavely	1,298

=== Round 9 ===
Home	Score	Away	Match Information
Home	Score	Away	Date and Time	Venue	Referee	Attendance	Report
Toulouse Olympique	22–24	Toronto Wolfpack	2 April, 13:30	Stade Ernest-Argelès	Jack Smith	3,513
Barrow Raiders	16–16	Swinton Lions	2 April, 15:00	The JF Hornby Stadium	Tom Grant	1,133
Dewsbury Rams	18–46	Halifax	22 April, 15:00^{C}	Tetley's Stadium	Marcus Griffiths	1,394
Leigh Centurions	31–18	London Broncos	2 April, 15:00	Leigh Sports Village	John McMullen	3,328
Rochdale Hornets	0–42	Featherstone Rovers	2 April, 15:00	Crown Oil Arena	Gareth Hewer	659
Sheffield Eagles	14–28	Batley Bulldogs	2 April, 15:00	Sheffield Olympic Legacy Stadium	Matthew Rossleigh	597

=== Round 10 ===
Home	Score	Away	Match Information
Home	Score	Away	Date and Time	Venue	Referee	Attendance	Report
Toulouse Olympique	50–4	Barrow Raiders	7 April, 14:00	Stade Ernest-Argelès	Matthew Rossleigh	1,177
Batley Bulldogs	18–26	Toronto Wolfpack	8 April, 15:00	Fox's Biscuits Stadium	Tom Grant	1,151
Featherstone Rovers	46–18	Dewsbury Rams	8 April, 15:00	LD Nutrition Stadium	Greg Dolan	2,031
Halifax	26–16	London Broncos	8 April, 15:00	The MBi Shay	Scott Mikalauskas	1,595
Leigh Centurions	68–10	Rochdale Hornets	8 April, 15:00	Leigh Sports Village	Jack Smith	3,144
Swinton Lions	18–19	Sheffield Eagles	8 April, 16:30	Heywood Road	John McMullen	532

=== Round 11 ===
Home	Score	Away	Match Information
Home	Score	Away	Date and Time	Venue	Referee	Attendance	Report
Rochdale Hornets	15–30	London Broncos	13 April, 19:45	Crown Oil Arena	John McMullen	312
Batley Bulldogs	46–22	Toulouse Olympique	14 April, 15:00	Fox's Biscuits Stadium	Liam Moore	662
Barrow Raiders	26–38	Featherstone Rovers	15 April, 15:00	The JF Hornby Stadium	Tom Crashley	1,231
Dewsbury Rams	12–23	Toronto Wolfpack	15 April, 15:00	Tetley's Stadium	Robert Hicks	932
Halifax	18–12	Swinton Lions	15 April, 15:00	The MBi Shay	Matthew Rossleigh	1,399
Sheffield Eagles	20–72	Leigh Centurions	15 April, 15:00	Sheffield Olympic Legacy Stadium	Tom Grant	982

=== Round 12 ===
Home	Score	Away	Match Information
Home	Score	Away	Date and Time	Venue	Referee	Attendance	Report
London Broncos	64–6	Dewsbury Rams	28 April, 15:00	Trailfinders Sports Ground	Matthew Rossleigh	733
Swinton Lions	8–62	Toulouse Olympique	28 April, 15:00	Heywood Road	Greg Dolan	2,155
Toronto Wolfpack	42–10	Halifax	28 April, 18:30	New River Stadium^{D}	Liam Moore	1,658
Featherstone Rovers	50–12	Batley Bulldogs	29 April, 15:00	LD Nutrition Stadium	John McMullen	2,425
Leigh Centurions	46–18	Barrow Raiders	29 April, 15:00	Leigh Sports Village	Marcus Griffiths	3,228
Rochdale Hornets	16–38	Sheffield Eagles	29 April, 15:00	Crown Oil Arena	Gareth Hewer	459

=== Round 13 ===
Home	Score	Away	Match Information
Home	Score	Away	Date and Time	Venue	Referee	Attendance	Report
Toulouse Olympique	36–10	Featherstone Rovers	5 May, 17:00	Stade Ernest-Argelès	Liam Staveley	2,876
Toronto Wolfpack	62–14	Swinton Lions	5 May, 21:30	Fletcher's Fields^{D}	Thomas Grant	2,917
Barrow Raiders	20–18	Batley Bulldogs	6 May, 15:00	The JF Hornby Stadium	Marcus Griffiths	1,211
Dewsbury Rams	27–32	Rochdale Hornets	6 May, 15:00	Tetley's Stadium	Scott Mikalauskas	649
London Broncos	30–40	Leigh Centurions	6 May, 15:00	Trailfinders Sports Ground	Greg Dolan	1,340
Sheffield Eagles	6–42	Halifax	6 May, 15:00	Sheffield Olympic Legacy Stadium	Billy Pearson	891

=== Round 14 ===
Home	Score	Away	Match Information
Home	Score	Away	Date and Time	Venue	Referee	Attendance	Report
Toronto Wolfpack	43–30	Toulouse Olympique	19 May, 12:45	St James' Park^{E}	Scott Mikalauskas	38,881
Featherstone Rovers	20–42	Leigh Centurions	19 May, 18:00	LD Nutrition Stadium	Matthew Rossleigh	2,854
Batley Bulldogs	23–14	Rochdale Hornets	20 May, 15:00	Fox's Biscuits Stadium	Greg Dolan	743
Halifax	22–22	Dewsbury Rams	20 May, 15:00	The MBi Shay	Ben Pearson	1,739
London Broncos	46–12	Sheffield Eagles	20 May, 15:00	Trailfinders Sports Ground	Liam Staveley	771
Swinton Lions	22–22	Barrow Raiders	20 May, 15:00	Heywood Road	Steve Race	656

=== Round 15 ===
Home	Score	Away	Match Information
Home	Score	Away	Date and Time	Venue	Referee	Attendance	Report
Barrow Raiders	22–38	Sheffield Eagles	26 May, 15:00	Bloomfield Road	Liam Staveley	7,877
Halifax	24–18	Featherstone Rovers	26 May, 17:15	Bloomfield Road	Tom Grant	7,877
Toronto Wolfpack	28–26	Leigh Centurions	26 May, 19:30	Bloomfield Road	Scott Mikalauskas	7,877
Toulouse Olympique	40–28	London Broncos	27 May, 13:00	Bloomfield Road	Gary Dolan	3,928
Rochdale Hornets	12–38	Swinton Lions	27 May, 15:15	Bloomfield Road	Matthew Rossleigh	3,928
Batley Bulldogs	18–20	Dewsbury Rams	27 May, 17:30	Bloomfield Road	Jack Smith	3,928

=== Round 16 ===
Home	Score	Away	Match Information
Home	Score	Away	Date and Time	Venue	Referee	Attendance	Report
Toulouse Olympique	42–26	Batley Bulldogs	9 June, 14:30	Stade Ernest-Argelès	Ben Pearson	2,250
Toronto Wolfpack	32–12	London Broncos	9 June, 21:30	Lamport Stadium	Tom Crashley	7,384
Barrow Raiders	20–6	Rochdale Hornets	10 June, 15:00	The JF Hornby Stadium		1,212
Dewsbury Rams	18–42	Featherstone Rovers	10 June, 15:00	Tetley's Stadium	Tom Grant	1,268
Leigh Centurions	36–30	Halifax	10 June, 15:00	Leigh Sports Village	Scott Mikalauskas	3,891
Sheffield Eagles	18–29	Swinton Lions	10 June, 15:00	Sheffield Olympic Legacy Stadium	John McMullen	872

=== Round 17 ===
Home	Score	Away	Match Information
Home	Score	Away	Date and Time	Venue	Referee	Attendance	Report
Toulouse Olympique	16–18	Leigh Centurions	16 June, 14:30	Stade Ernest-Argelès	Nick Bennett	5,373
Toronto Wolfpack	64–12	Dewsbury Rams	16 June, 21:30	Lamport Stadium	Tom Grant	5,937
Batley Bulldogs	20–38	Sheffield Eagles	17 June, 15:00	Fox's Biscuits Stadium	Scot Mikalauskas	2,328
Featherstone Rovers	52–4	Barrow Raiders	17 June, 15:00	LD Nutrition Stadium	Greg Dolan	1,880
London Broncos	68–0	Rochdale Hornets	17 June, 15:00	Trailfinders Sports Ground	Jack Smith	684
Swinton Lions	4–46	Halifax	17 June, 15:00	Heywood Road	Marcus Griffiths	953

=== Round 18 ===
Home	Score	Away	Match Information
Home	Score	Away	Date and Time	Venue	Referee	Attendance	Report
Toronto Wolfpack	64–0	Barrow Raiders	23 June, 21:30	Lamport Stadium	John McMullen	5,287
Sheffield Eagles	6–40	Featherstone Rovers	23 June, 15:00	Sheffield Olympic Legacy Stadium	Gary Dolan	917
Dewsbury Rams	12–58	Leigh Centurions	24 June, 15:00	Tetley's Stadium	Jack Smith	1,351
Halifax	50–12	Batley Bulldogs	24 June, 15:00	The MBi Shay	Tom Grant	1,561
London Broncos	58–22	Swinton Lions	24 June, 15:00	Trailfinders Sports Ground	Scott Mikalauskas	684
Rochdale Hornets	14–70	Toulouse Olympique	24 June, 15:00	Crown Oil Arena	Gareth Hewer	304

=== Round 19 ===
Home	Score	Away	Match Information
Home	Score	Away	Date and Time	Venue	Referee	Attendance	Report
Toronto Wolfpack	46–28	Leigh Centurions	30 June, 21:30	Lamport Stadium	Gareth Hewer	6,844
Barrow Raiders	22–48	Halifax	1 July, 15:00	The JF Hornby Stadium	Liam Staveley	1,293
Batley Bulldogs	16–38	London Broncos	1 July, 15:00	Fox's Biscuits Stadium	John McMullen	889
Featherstone Rovers	80–4	Rochdale Hornets	1 July, 15:00	LD Nutrition Stadium	Jack Smith	1,820
Sheffield Eagles	24–46	Toulouse Olympique	1 July, 15:00	Sheffield Olympic Legacy Stadium	Marcus Griffiths	458
Swinton Lions	29–28	Dewsbury Rams	1 July, 15:00	Heywood Road	Michael Mannifield	555

=== Round 20 ===
Home	Score	Away	Match Information
Home	Score	Away	Date and Time	Venue	Referee	Attendance	Report
Toulouse Olympique	20–20	London Broncos	7 July, 14:30	Stade Ernest-Argelès	Matthew Rossleigh	2,544
Toronto Wolfpack	68–4	Sheffield Eagles	7 July, 21:30	Lamport Stadium	Steve Race	6,329
Batley Bulldogs	12–30	Leigh Centurions	8 July, 15:00	Fox's Biscuits Stadium	James Child	1,223
Dewsbury Rams	22–20	Barrow Raiders	8 July, 15:00	Tetley's Stadium	Jack Smith	635
Halifax	34–20	Featherstone Rovers	8 July, 15:00	The MBi Shay	Tom Grant	2,356
Rochdale Hornets	28–26	Swinton Lions	8 July, 15:00	Crown Oil Arena	Greg Dolan	672

=== Round 21 ===
Home	Score	Away	Match Information
Home	Score	Away	Date and Time	Venue	Referee	Attendance	Report
Toronto Wolfpack	64–18	Batley Bulldogs	14 July, 21:30	Lamport Stadium	Michael Mannifield	6,088
Barrow Raiders	6–72	Toulouse Olympique	15 July, 15:00	The JF Hornby Stadium		981
London Broncos	20–18	Halifax	15 July, 15:00	Trailfinders Sports Ground	James Child	754
Rochdale Hornets	32–54	Leigh Centurions	14 July, 17:00	Crown Oil Arena	Steve Race	1,080
Sheffield Eagles	30–28	Dewsbury Rams	15 July, 15:00	Sheffield Olympic Legacy Stadium		425
Swinton Lions	4–60	Featherstone Rovers	15 July, 15:00	Heywood Road		610

=== Round 22 ===
Home	Score	Away	Match Information
Home	Score	Away	Date and Time	Venue	Referee	Attendance	Report
Toronto Wolfpack	52–10	Rochdale Hornets	21 July, 21:30	Lamport Stadium		7,144
Dewsbury Rams	23–20	Batley Bulldogs	22 July, 15:00	Tetley's Stadium	John McMullen/Jamie Butterfield ^{F}	1,501
Featherstone Rovers	7–14	London Broncos	22 July, 15:00	LD Nutrition Stadium		2,434
Halifax	19–14	Toulouse Olympique	22 July, 15:00	The MBi Shay		1,794
Leigh Centurions	50–24	Swinton Lions	22 July, 15:00	Leigh Sports Village		3,680
Sheffield Eagles	28–10	Barrow Raiders	22 July, 15:00	Sheffield Olympic Legacy Stadium		702

=== Round 23 ===
Home	Score	Away	Match Information
Home	Score	Away	Date and Time	Venue	Referee	Attendance	Report
Toulouse Olympique	44–18	Dewsbury Rams	28 July, 14:30	Stade Ernest-Argelès	N. Bennett	1,914
Toronto Wolfpack	12–30	Featherstone Rovers	28 July, 18:30	Lamport Stadium	G. Dolan	8,217
Barrow Raiders	6–72	London Broncos	29 July, 15:00	Craven Park Stadium	B. Thaler	1,044
Batley Bulldogs	40–18	Swinton Lions	29 July, 15:00	The Fox's Biscuits Stadium	M. Rossleigh	856
Halifax	38–6	Rochdale Hornets	29 July, 15:00	The MBI Shay Stadium	J. Smith	1,866
Leigh Centurions	34–10	Sheffield Eagles	29 July, 15:00	Leigh Sports Village Stadium	C. Kendall	3,112

== Championship Shield ==
=== Round 1 ===
Home	Score	Away	Match Information
Home	Score	Away	Date and Time	Venue	Referee	Attendance	Report
Barrow Raiders	17–10	Rochdale Hornets	12 August	The JF Hornby Stadium	Marcus Griffiths	1,033
Dewsbury Rams	40–7	Swinton Lions	12 August	Tetley's Stadium	Tom Grant	752
Featherstone Rovers	26–12	Batley Bulldogs	12 August	LD Nutrition Stadium	Matthew Rossleigh	1,236
Leigh Centurions	68–6	Sheffield Eagles	12 August	Leigh Sports Village	Nick Bennett	2.647

=== Round 2 ===
Home	Score	Away	Match Information
Home	Score	Away	Date and Time	Venue	Referee	Attendance	Report
Batley Bulldogs	42–22	Dewsbury Rams	19 August	The Fox's Biscuits Stadium	Jack Smith	1,485
Leigh Centurions	38–0	Barrow Raiders	19 August	Leigh Sports Village	Tom Grant	2,646
Rochdale Hornets	24–33	Featherstone Rovers	19 August	Crown Oil Arena	Nick Bennett	586
Swinton Lions	18–26	Sheffield Eagles	19 August	Heywood Road	Matthew Rossleigh	420

=== Round 3 ===
Home	Score	Away	Match Information
Home	Score	Away	Date and Time	Venue	Referee	Attendance	Report
Sheffield Eagles	20–30	Dewsbury Rams	31 August	Sheffield Olympic Legacy Stadium	Nick Bennett	638
Barrow Raiders	16–36	Batley Bulldogs	2 September	The JF Hornby Stadium	James Child	1,103
Featherstone Rovers	22–4	Leigh Centurions	2 September	LD Nutrition Stadium	Matthew Rossleigh	2,194
Swinton Lions	23–18	Rochdale Hornets	2 September	Heywood Road	Jack Smith	541

=== Round 4 ===
Home	Score	Away	Match Information
Home	Score	Away	Date and Time	Venue	Referee	Attendance	Report
Sheffield Eagles	12–32	Featherstone Rovers	7 September	Sheffield Olympic Legacy Stadium	Greg Dolan	689
Batley Bulldogs	26–12	Rochdale Hornets	9 September	The Fox's Biscuits Stadium	Nick Bennett	616
Dewsbury Rams	32–12	Barrow Raiders	9 September	Tetley's Stadium	Liam Staveley	807
Leigh Centurions	54–10	Swinton Lions	9 September	Leigh Sports Village	Scott Mikalauskas	2,757

=== Round 5 ===
Home	Score	Away	Match Information
Home	Score	Away	Date and Time	Venue	Referee	Attendance	Report
Barrow Raiders	34–18	Swinton Lions	16 September	The JF Hornby Stadium	Liam Moore	1,537
Batley Bulldogs	44–4	Sheffield Eagles	16 September	The Fox's Biscuits Stadium	Marcus Griffiths	607
Featherstone Rovers	40–28	Dewsbury Rams	16 September	LD Nutrition Stadium	Nick Bennett	1,380
Rochdale Hornets	16–24	Leigh Centurions	16 September	Crown Oil Arena	John McMullen	834

=== Round 6 ===
Home	Score	Away	Match Information
Home	Score	Away	Date and Time	Venue	Referee	Attendance	Report
Leigh Centurions	16–30	Batley Bulldogs	23 September	Leigh Sports Village	Ben Pearson	1,730
Rochdale Hornets	26–22	Dewsbury Rams	23 September	Crown Oil Arena	James Child	651
Sheffield Eagles	22–24	Barrow Raiders	23 September	Sheffield Olympic Legacy Stadium	Andy Sweet	404
Swinton Lions	18–34	Featherstone Rovers	23 September	Heywood Road	Tom Grant	606

=== Round 7 ===
Home	Score	Away	Match Information
Home	Score	Away	Date and Time	Venue	Referee	Attendance	Report
Batley Bulldogs	40–6	Swinton Lions	30 September	The Fox's Biscuits Stadium	John McMullen	817
Dewsbury Rams	52–6	Leigh Centurions	30 September	Tetley's Stadium	Andy Sweet	999
Featherstone Rovers	34–6	Barrow Raiders	30 September	LD Nutrition Stadium	Tom Crashley	1,125
Sheffield Eagles	22–32	Rochdale Hornets	30 September	Sheffield Olympic Legacy Stadium	Tom Grant	789

=== Shield final ===
Home	Score	Away	Match Information
Home	Score	Away	Date and Time	Venue	Referee	Attendance	Report
Featherstone Rovers	42–10	Leigh Centurions	7 October	LD Nutrition Stadium	John McMullen	2,123

=== Promotion play-off final ===
Home	Score	Away	Match Information
Home	Score	Away	Date and Time	Venue	Referee	Attendance	Report
Swinton Lions	33–20	Workington Town	14 October 2018, 15:00	Heywood Road	Greg Dolan	703

== Notes ==
- A. Game rescheduled due to poor pitch conditions.
- B. Three games were cancelled in Round 5 due to ice and snow.
- C. Game rescheduled due to poor weather conditions.
- D. Due to renovations, the games have been rescheduled from the initial venue of Lamport Stadium.
- E. Game rescheduled, from the initial venue of Lamport Stadium, in order to commemorate Toulouse Olympique, who narrowly missed out on the qualifiers last season, and Toronto, who became League 1 champions in their inaugural season. The game will be the curtain raiser to the Super League XXIII Magic Weekend.
- F. John McMullen was injured during the 1st half and replaced by touch judge Jamie Butterfield.
