= 2019 RFL Championship season results =

This is a list of the 2019 RFL Championship season results. The Championship is the second-tier rugby league competition in the United Kingdom. The season is scheduled to begin on February 3.

The regular season will be played over 27 round-robin fixtures, where each of the fourteen teams involved in the competition play each other, once at home and once away. Teams will also play one extra match on the Summer Bash Weekend.

The play-offs will commence after the round-robin fixtures. The top 5 teams will play against each other to determine who get promoted. In the first round of the play-offs 4th place will verse 5th in an elimination final while 2nd place will verse 3rd place in a qualifying final. The second round of the play-offs will then have the winner of the elimination final verse the loser of the qualifying final and 1st place verse the winner of the qualifying final in a match that will give the winning team a spot in the championship play-off. Round three then has the winner of the 1st semi-final versus the loser of the 2nd semi-final as a preliminary play-off. Then comes the championship play-off where the winner of the 2nd semi-final versus the winner of the preliminary final.

The bottom two teams get relegated to League 1.

== Regular season ==
All times are UK local time (UTC or UTC+1) on the relevant dates.

=== Round 1 ===
Home	Score	Away	Match Information
Home	Score	Away	Date and Time	Venue	Referee	Attendance
York City Knights	0–14	Toronto Wolfpack	3 February 2019, 15:00	Bootham Crescent	G. Hewer	2,518
Leigh Centurions	24–16	Toulouse Olympique XIII	3 February 2019, 15:00	Leigh Sports Village Stadium	M. Griffiths	2,987
Batley Bulldogs	18–22	Barrow Raiders	3 February 2019, 15:00	The Fox's Biscuit Stadium	M. Mannifield	755
Bradford Bulls	17–16	Featherstone Rovers	3 February 2019, 15:00	Odsal Stadium	J. Smith	6,025
Rochdale Hornets	12-32	Dewsbury Rams	28 July 2019, 15:00	Crown Oil Arena	J. Child	574
Sheffield Eagles	64–10	Swinton Lions	3 February 2019, 15:00	Olympic Legacy Park	M. Rossleigh	1,259
Widnes Vikings	40–16	Halifax	3 February 2019, 15:00	Halton Stadium	S. Makalauskas	4,283

=== Round 2 ===
Home	Score	Away	Match Information
Home	Score	Away	Date and Time	Venue	Referee	Attendance
Toulouse Olympique XIII	24–36	Widnes Vikings	9 February 2019, 14:30	Stade Ernest Argeles, Blagnac	S. Makalauskas	2,189
Barrow Raiders	22–24	Sheffield Eagles	10 February 2019, 15:00	Craven Park	M. Rossleigh	1,514
Dewsbury Rams	22–26	York City Knights	10 February 2019, 15:00	Tetley's Stadium	M. Mannifield	1,275
Featherstone Rovers	42–14	Batley Bulldogs	10 February 2019, 15:00	LD Nutrition Stadium	M. Griffiths	2,145
Halifax	33–26	Leigh Centurions	10 February 2019, 15:00	The MBI Shay Stadium	G. Hewer	2,245
Rochdale Hornets	6–58	Toronto Wolfpack	10 February 2019, 15:00	Crown Oil Arena	J. Smith	694
Swinton Lions	12–31	Bradford Bulls	10 February 2019, 15:00	Heywood Road	J. McMullen	1,498

=== Round 3 ===
Home	Score	Away	Match Information
Home	Score	Away	Date and Time	Venue	Referee	Attendance
Sheffield Eagles	24–10	Bradford Bulls	15 February 2019, 19:45	Olympic Legacy Park	M. Griffiths	1,711
Toulouse Olympique XIII	42–12	Rochdale Hornets	16 February 2019, 14:30	Stade Ernest Argeles, Blagnac	M. Mannifield	1,707
Toronto Wolfpack	30–6	Widnes Vikings	16 February 2019, 17:00	Kingston Park, Newcastle	L. Moore	1,817
Dewsbury Rams	38–24	Swinton Lions	17 February 2019, 15:00	Tetley's Stadium	G. Hewer	993
Halifax	20–18	Batley Bulldogs	17 February 2019, 15:00	The MBI Shay Stadium	M. Rossleigh	1,825
Leigh Centurions	29–20	Featherstone Rovers	17 February 2019, 15:00	Leigh Sports Village Stadium	J. Smith	3,443
York City Knights	56–0	Barrow Raiders	17 February 2019, 15:00	Bootham Crescent	L. Staveley	1,575

=== Round 4 ===
Home	Score	Away	Match Information
Home	Score	Away	Date and Time	Venue	Referee	Attendance
Barrow Raiders	20-20	Dewsbury Rams	24 February 2019, 15:00	Craven Park	M. Mannifield	1,321
Batley Bulldogs	18-12	Rochdale Hornets	24 February 2019, 15:00	The Fox's Biscuit Stadium	L. Staveley	757
Bradford Bulls	14-24	York City Knights	24 February 2019, 15:00	Odsal Stadium	G. Dolan	4,182
Featherstone Rovers	46-16	Halifax	24 February 2019, 15:00	LD Nutrition Stadium	M. Griffiths	2,534
Leigh Centurions	8-14	Toronto Wolfpack	24 February 2019, 15:00	Leigh Sports Village Stadium	T. Grant	3,142
Swinton Lions	24-26	Toulouse Olympique XIII	24 February 2019, 15:00	Heywood Road	J. Smith	601
Widnes Vikings	36-6 (Note: Widnes v Sheffield postponed due to Widnes club going into administration and insurance for the players not being in place.)	Sheffield Eagles	31 May 2019, 19:45	Halton Stadium	G. Hewer	4,920

=== Round 5 ===
Home	Score	Away	Match Information
Home	Score	Away	Date and Time	Venue	Referee	Attendance
Sheffield Eagles	44–16	Batley Bulldogs	1 March 2019, 19:45	Olympic Legacy Park	N. Bennett	791
Bradford Bulls	0–14	Toulouse Olympique XIII	3 March 2019, 15:00	Odsal Stadium	J. Smith	3,751
Dewsbury Rams	17–22	Toronto Wolfpack	3 March 2019, 15:00	Tetley's Stadium	M. Mannifield	1,251
Halifax	18–16	Swinton Lions	3 March 2019, 15:00	The MBI Shay Stadium	L. Staveley	1,584
Rochdale Hornets	20–8	Barrow Raiders	3 March 2019, 15:00	Crown Oil Arena	G. Dolan	514
Widnes Vikings	44–22	Featherstone Rovers	3 March 2019, 15:00	Halton Stadium	M. Griffiths	5,782
York City Knights	9–8	Leigh Centurions	3 March 2019, 15:00	Bootham Crescent	J. Child	2,020

=== Round 6 ===
Home	Score	Away	Match Information
Home	Score	Away	Date and Time	Venue	Referee	Attendance
Toulouse Olympique XIII	46–16	Toronto Wolfpack	9 March 2019 14:30	Stade Ernest-Wallon, Toulouse	G. Hewer	6,103
Barrow Raiders	4–20	Widnes Vikings	10 March 2019 15:00	Craven Park	J. Child	1,745
Batley Bulldogs	6–16	Bradford Bulls	10 March 2019 15:00	The Fox's Biscuit Stadium	M. Mannifield	2,393
Featherstone Rovers	32–14	Sheffield Eagles	10 March 2019 15:00	LD Nutrition Stadium	L. Moore	1,891
Halifax	26–0	Dewsbury Rams	10 March 2019 15:00	The MBI Shay Stadium	J. Smith	1,343
Swinton Lions	12–30	Leigh Centurions	10 March 2019 15:00	Heywood Road	G. Dolan	2,054
Rochdale Hornets	18–24 (Note: Rochdale v York postponed on original scheduled date of 10 March as stadium staff failed to prepare pitch.)	York City Knights	12 May 2019 15:00	Crown Oil Arena	J. McMullen	513

=== Round 7 ===
Home	Score	Away	Match Information
Home	Score	Away	Date and Time	Venue	Referee	Attendance
Toulouse Olympique XIII	50–0	Barrow Raiders	16 March 2019 14:30	Stade Ernest Argeles, Blagnac	C. Worsley	1,388
Dewsbury Rams	13–16	Sheffield Eagles	17 March 2019 15:00	Tetley's Stadium	J. Smith	977
Leigh Centurions	46–6	Rochdale Hornets	17 March 2019 15:00	Leigh Sports Village Stadium	M. Griffiths	2,666
Swinton Lions	12–24	Featherstone Rovers	17 March 2019 15:00	Heywood Road	M. Mannifield	923
Toronto Wolfpack	34–12	Batley Bulldogs	17 March 2019 15:00	KCOM Craven Park	G. Dolan	not recorded (Note: Toronto v Batley was part of a double-header with the Super League game between Hull Kingston Rovers and Catalans Dragons for which the recorded attendance was 7,203.)
Widnes Vikings	25–20	Bradford Bulls	17 March 2019 15:00	Halton Stadium	G. Hewer	5,335
York City Knights	38–16	Halifax	17 March 2019 15:00	Bootham Crescent	T. Grant	2,101

=== Round 8 ===
Home	Score	Away	Match Information
Home	Score	Away	Date and Time	Venue	Referee	Attendance
Batley Bulldogs	12–38	Toulouse Olympique XIII	23 March 2019 15:00	The Fox's Biscuit Stadium	T. Crashley	857
Barrow Raiders	26–33	Swinton Lions	24 March 2019 15:00	Craven Park	M. Griffith	1,357
Bradford Bulls	26–12	Leigh Centurions	24 March 2019 15:00	Odsal Stadium	T. Grant	4,381
Featherstone Rovers	22–32	Dewsbury Rams	24 March 2019 15:00	LD Nutrition Stadium	G. Hewer	1,943
Halifax	12–48	Toronto Wolfpack	24 March 2019 15:00	The MBI Shay Stadium	L. Moore	2,090
Rochdale Hornets	4–50	Widnes Vikings	24 March 2019 15:00	Crown Oil Arena	M. Mannifield	1,732
York City Knights	16–24	Sheffield Eagles	24 March 2019 15:00	Bootham Crescent	J. Smith	1,822

=== Round 9 ===
Home	Score	Away	Match Information
Home	Score	Away	Date and Time	Venue	Referee	Attendance
Toulouse Olympique XIII	8–2	Featherstone Rovers	6 April 2019 14:30	Stade Ernest Argeles, Blagnac	G. Dolan	2,251
Toronto Wolfpack	40–10	Sheffield Eagles	6 April 2019 15:05	New River Stadium	M. Rossleigh	1,148
Batley Bulldogs	20–18	Widnes Vikings	7 April 2019 15:00	The Fox's Biscuit Stadium	M. Griffiths	1,420
Bradford Bulls	20–12	Dewsbury Rams	7 April 2019 15:00	Odsal Stadium	J. Mcullen	4,068
Leigh Centurions	46–30	Barrow Raiders	7 April 2019 15:00	Leigh Sports Village Stadium	B. Thaler	3,036
Rochdale Hornets	24–48	Halifax	7 April 2019 15:00	Crown Oil Arena	T. Crashley	874
York City Knights	30–20	Swinton Lions	7 April 2019 15:00	Bootham Crescent	B. Pearson	1,606

=== Round 10 ===
Home	Score	Away	Match Information
Home	Score	Away	Date and Time	Venue	Referee	Attendance
Barrow Raiders	26–52	Toronto Wolfpack	19 April 2019 15:00	Craven Park	B. Pearson	1,417
Halifax	26–33	Bradford Bulls	19 April 2019 15:00	The MBI Shay	G. Dolan	3,316
Swinton Lions	36–22	Rochdale Hornets	19 April 2019 15:00	Heywood Road	M. Rossleigh	826
Widnes Vikings	30–12	Leigh Centurions	19 April 2019 15:00	Select Security Stadium	S. Mikalauskas	5,866
Featherstone Rovers	42–12	York City Knights	19 April 2019 18:00	LD Nutrition Stadium	J. McMullen	2,216
Sheffield Eagles	44–16	Toulouse Olympique	19 April 2019 18:00	Olympic Legacy Park	M. Griffiths	729
Dewsbury Rams	8–20	Batley Bulldogs	19 April 2019 19:00	Tetley's Stadium	M. Mannifield	1,276

=== Round 11 ===
Home	Score	Away	Match Information
Home	Score	Away	Date and Time	Venue	Referee	Attendance
Toulouse Olympique	56–4	Halifax	22 April 2019 14:30	Stade Ernest-Argeles	S. Mikalauskus	2,038
Batley Bulldogs	32–18	Swinton Lions	22 April 2019 15:00	The Fox's Biscuit Stadium	L. Moore	759
Bradford Bulls	26–14	Barrow Raiders	22 April 2019 15:00	Odsal Stadium	N. Bennett	4,011
Featherstone Rovers	14–23	Toronto Wolfpack	22 April 2019 15:00	LD Nutrition Stadium	G. Hewer	2,101
Leigh Centurions	34–12	Dewsbury Rams	22 April 2019 15:00	Leigh Sports Village	B. Pearson	3,043
Rochdale Hornets	16–52	Sheffield Eagles	22 April 2019 15:00	Crown Oil Arena	M. Rossleigh	569
York City Knights	17–10	Widnes Vikings	22 April 2019 15:00	Bootham Crescent	G. Dolan	2,229

=== Round 12 ===
Home	Score	Away	Match Information
Home	Score	Away	Date and Time	Venue	Referee	Attendance
Toulouse Olympique	30–26	York City Knights	27 April 2019 14:30	Stade Ernest-Argeles	M. Griffiths	1,793
Barrow Raiders	12–26	Featherstone Rovers	28 April 2019 15:00	Craven Park	J. Smith	1,277
Batley Bulldogs	16–36	Leigh Centurions	28 April 2019 15:00	The Fox's Biscuit Stadium	J. McMullen	1,240
Bradford Bulls	52–16	Rochdale Hornets	28 April 2019 15:00	Odsal Stadium	G. Hewer	3,721
Sheffield Eagles	24–32	Halifax	28 April 2019 15:00	Olympic Legacy Park	B. Pearson	966
Toronto Wolfpack	52–10	Swinton Lions	28 April 2019 15:00	Lamport Stadium	G. Dolan	9,562
Widnes Vikings	24–25	Dewsbury Rams	28 April 2019 15:00	Select Security Stadium	M. Rossleigh	3,851

=== Round 13 ===
Home	Score	Away	Match Information
Home	Score	Away	Date and Time	Venue	Referee	Attendance
Dewsbury Rams	0–38	Toulouse Olympique	4 May 2019 15:00	Tetley's Stadium	N. Bennett	786
Toronto Wolfpack	36–16	Bradford Bulls	4 May 2019 19:00	Lamport Stadium	M. Griffiths	8,363
Halifax	46–10	Barrow Raiders	5 May 2019 15:00	The MBI Shay	G. Hewer	1,446
Leigh Centurions	42–38	Sheffield Eagles	5 May 2019 15:00	Leigh Sports Village Stadium	T. Grant	3,031
Rochdale Hornets	10–56	Featherstone Rovers	5 May 2019 15:00	Crown Oil Arena	B. Pearson	714
Swinton Lions	10–32	Widnes Vikings	5 May 2019 15:00	Heywood Road	M. Mannifield	1,469
York City Knights	28–24	Batley Bulldogs	5 May 2019 15:00	Bootham Crescent	G. Dolan	1,978

=== Round 14 ===
Home	Score	Away	Match Information
Home	Score	Away	Date and Time	Venue	Referee	Attendance
Toronto Wolfpack	42–14	Toulouse Olympique	18 May 2019 13:15	Bloomfield Road	J. Smith	7,912
Rochdale Hornets	30–40	Swinton Lions	18 May 2019 15:30	Bloomfield Road	G. Hewer	7,912
Featherstone Rovers	42–10	York City Knights	18 May 2019 17:45	Bloomfield Road	B. Pearson	7,912
Bradford Bulls	14–21	Halifax	18 May 2019 20:00	Bloomfield Road	T. Grant	7,912
Barrow Raiders	18–30	Sheffield Eagles	19 May 2019 13:00	Bloomfield Road	M. Mannifield	7,158
Batley Bulldogs	30–14	Dewsbury Rams	19 May 2019 15:15	Bloomfield Road	M. Rossleigh	7,158
Leigh Centurions	36–22	Widnes Vikings	19 May 2019 17:30	Bloomfield Road	G. Dolan	7,158

=== Round 15 ===
Home	Score	Away	Match Information
Home	Score	Away	Date and Time	Venue	Referee	Attendance
Sheffield Eagles	16–42	Toronto Wolfpack	24 May 2019 19:45	Olympic Legacy Park	B. Pearson	932
Toulouse Olympique	44–16	Leigh Centurions	25 May 2019 13:00	Stade Ernest-Argeles	M. Griffiths	2,235
Barrow Raiders	54–10	Rochdale Hornets	26 May 2019 15:00	Craven Park	M. Rossleigh	1,114
Batley Bulldogs	24–16	Halifax	26 May 2019 15:00	The Fox's Biscuit Stadium	N. Bennett	1,368
Featherstone Rovers	42–4	Bradford Bulls	26 May 2019 15:00	LD Nutrition Stadium	G. Hewer	2,903
Swinton Lions	22–17	Dewsbury Rams	26 May 2019 15:00	Heywood Road	M. Mannifield	795
Widnes Vikings	12–16	York City Knights	26 May 2019 15:00	Select Security Stadium	J. McMullen	3,408

=== Round 16 ===
Home	Score	Away	Match Information
Home	Score	Away	Date and Time	Venue	Referee	Attendance
York City Knights	18–25	Toulouse Olympique	8 June 2019, 15:00	Bootham Crescent	J. Child	1,656
Bradford Bulls	16–0	Batley Bulldogs	9 June 2019, 15:00	Odsal Stadium	M. Rossleigh	3,414
Dewsbury Rams	66–10	Rochdale Hornets	9 June 2019, 15:00	Tetley's Stadium	G. Hewer	865
Leigh Centurions	31–8	Halifax	9 June 2019, 15:00	Leigh Sports Village	J. Smith	3,361
Sheffield Eagles	18–38	Featherstone Rovers	9 June 2019, 15:00	Olympic Legacy Park	B. Pearson	1,321
Widnes Vikings	38–14	Barrow Raiders	9 June 2019, 15:00	Select Security Stadium	T. Grant	3,830
Swinton Lions	14–34	Toronto Wolfpack	9 June 2019, 18:00	Heywood Road	G. Dolan	1,281

=== Round 17 ===
Home	Score	Away	Match Information
Home	Score	Away	Date and Time	Venue	Referee	Attendance
Toulouse Olympique	18–20	Swinton Lions	15 June 2019, 14:30	Stade Ernest-Argeles	G. Dolan	2,589
Toronto Wolfpack	70–8	Dewsbury Rams	15 June 2019, 17:50	Lamport Stadium	T. Grant	6,735
Barrow Raiders	21–8	Halifax	16 June 2019, 15:00	Craven Park	G. Hewer	1,396
Batley Bulldogs	24–54	Sheffield Eagles	16 June 2019, 15:00	Mount Pleasant	J. Smith	2,789
Featherstone Rovers	22–8	Widnes Vikings	16 June 2019, 15:00	LD Nutrition Stadium	M. Mannifield	2,380
Leigh Centurions	52–20	Bradford Bulls	16 June 2019, 15:00	Leigh Sports Village	B. Thaler	4,180
York City Knights	60–0	Rochdale Hornets	16 June 2019, 15:00	Bootham Crescent	A. Moore	1,661

=== Round 18 ===
Home	Score	Away	Match Information
Home	Score	Away	Date and Time	Venue	Referee	Attendance
Sheffield Eagles	46–24	Rochdale Hornets	21 June 2019, 19:45	Olympic Legacy Park	C. Worsley	543
Widnes Vikings	28–22	Batley Bulldogs	21 June 2019, 20:00	Select Security Stadium	G. Hewer	3,742
Toronto Wolfpack	28–16	Toulouse Olympique	22 June 2019, 18:00	Lamport Stadium	G. Dolan	7,742
Bradford Bulls	24–20	Halifax	23 June 2019, 15:00	Odsal Stadium	J. Smith	5,203
Dewsbury Rams	0–40	Leigh Centurions	23 June 2019, 15:00	Tetley's Stadium	B. Pearson	1,668
Featherstone Rovers	16–38	Barrow Raiders	23 June 2019, 15:00	LD Nutrition Stadium	A. Moore	1,928
Swinton Lions	12–26	York City Knights	23 June 2019, 15:00	Heywood Road	M. Mannifield	976

=== Round 19 ===
Home	Score	Away	Match Information
Home	Score	Away	Date and Time	Venue	Referee	Attendance
Barrow Raiders	6–36	Toulouse Olympique	30 June 2019, 15:00	Craven Park	T. Grant	1,422
Batley Bulldogs	10–40	Toronto Wolfpack	30 June 2019, 15:00	Mount Pleasant	C. Worlsye	894
Bradford Bulls	62–0	Widnes Vikings	30 June 2019, 15:00	Odsal Stadium	B. Pearson	3,895
Halifax	18–24	Featherstone Rovers	30 June 2019, 15:00	The Mbi Shay	G. Hewer	1,888
Rochdale Hornets	28–36	Swinton Lions	30 June 2019, 15:00	Mayfield Sports Centre	L. Moore	549
Sheffield Eagles	18–22	Leigh Centurions	30 June 2019, 15:00	Olympic Legacy Park	M. Mannifield	1,082
York City Knights	24–21	Dewsbury Rams	30 June 2019, 15:00	Bootham Crescent	M. Rossleigh	1,338

=== Round 20 ===
Home	Score	Away	Match Information
Home	Score	Away	Date and Time	Venue	Referee	Attendance
Sheffield Eagles	16–23	York City Knights	5 July 2019, 19:45	Olympic Legacy Park	A. Moore	793
Toronto Wolfpack	34–12	Halifax	6 July 2019, 18:00	Lamport Stadium	M. Mannifield	6,749
Toulouse Olympique	24–26	Bradford Bulls	6 July 2019, 19:00	Stade Ernest-Argeles	C. Worsley	3,741
Dewsbury Rams	40–26	Barrow Raiders	7 July 2019, 15:00	Tetley's Stadium	J. Smith	856
Featherstone Rovers	24–20	Leigh Centurions	7 July 2019, 15:00	LD Nutrition Stadium	S. Mikalauskus	3,104
Swinton Lions	20–18	Batley Bulldogs	7 July 2019, 15:00	Heywood Road	T. Grant	888
Widnes Vikings	40–12	Rochdale Hornets	7 July 2019, 15:00	Halton Stadium	G. Hewer	3,780

=== Round 21 ===
Home	Score	Away	Match Information
Home	Score	Away	Date and Time	Venue	Referee	Attendance
Sheffield Eagles	28–22	Dewsbury Rams	12 July 2019, 19:45	Olympic Legacy Park	G. Hewer	691
Rochdale Hornets	0–68	Toulouse Olympique	13 July 2019, 15:00	Crown Oil Arena	M. Rossleigh	337
Toronto Wolfpack	22–18	Featherstone Rovers	13 July 2019, 18:00	Lamport Stadium	J. Smith	7,819
Barrow Raiders	8–24	Leigh Centurions	14 July 2019, 15:00	Craven Park	T. Grant	1,637
Batley Bulldogs	14–14	York City Knights	14 July 2019, 15:00	The Fox's Biscuit Stadium	S. Mikalauskas	1,009
Bradford Bulls	34–34	Swinton Lions	14 July 2019, 15:00	Odsal Stadium	C. Worsley	3,104
Halifax	40–10	Widnes Vikings	14 July 2019, 15:00	The MBI Shay	J. Child	1,668

=== Round 22 ===
Home	Score	Away	Match Information
Home	Score	Away	Date and Time	Venue	Referee	Attendance
Toulouse Olympique	56–18	Sheffield Eagles	20 July 2019, 17:00	Stade Ernest-Argeles	J. Child	2,154
Dewsbury Rams	28–28	Halifax	21 July 2019, 15:00	Tetley's Stadium	M. Rossleigh	1,136
Featherstone Rovers	50–6	Rochdale Hornets	21 July 2019, 15:00	LD Nutrition Stadium	A. moore	2,011
Leigh Centurions	48–12	Batley Bulldogs	21 July 2019, 15:00	Leigh Sports Village	B. Pearson	3,125
Swinton Lions	30–12	Barrow Raiders	21 July 2019, 15:00	Heywood Road	G. Hewer	984
York City Knights	25–24	Bradford Bulls	21 July 2019, 15:00	Bootham Crescent	G. Dolan	4,554
Widnes Vikings	19–24	Toronto Wolfpack	21 July 2019, 17:35	Select Security Stadium	L. Moore	3,813

=== Round 23 ===
Home	Score	Away	Match Information
Home	Score	Away	Date and Time	Venue	Referee	Attendance
Sheffield Eagles	30–10	Widnes Vikings	2 August 2019, 19:45	Olympic Legacy Park	G. Dolan	772
Barrow Raiders	16–24	York City Knights	4 August 2019, 15:00	Craven Park	J. Smith	1,169
Bradford Bulls	20–25	Toronto Wolfpack	4 August 2019, 15:00	Odsal Stadium	S. Mikalauskas	3,121
Dewsbury Rams	24–25	Featherstone Rovers	4 August 2019, 15:00	Tetley's Stadium	B. Pearson	1,229
Halifax RLFC	22–30	Toulouse Olympique	4 August 2019, 15:00	The MBI Shay	C. Worsley	1,290
Leigh Centurions	31–30	Swinton Lions	4 August 2019, 15:00	Leigh Sports Village	G. Hewer	3,155
Rochdale Hornets	26–50	Batley Bulldogs	4 August 2019, 15:00	Crown Oil Arena	M. Mannifield	638

=== Round 24 ===
Home	Score	Away	Match Information
Home	Score	Away	Date and Time	Venue	Referee	Attendance
Widnes Vikings	12–28	Toulouse Olympique	10 August 2019, 15:00	Select Security Stadium	J. Child	3,643
Toronto Wolfpack	56–6	York City Knights	10 August 2019, 15:00	Lamport Stadium	T. Grant	8,102
Barrow Raiders	22–46	Bradford Bulls	11 August 2019, 15:00	Craven Park	J. Smith	1,471
Batley Bulldogs	16–10	Dewsbury Rams	11 August 2019, 15:00	Mount Pleasant	C. Worsley	1,619
Featherstone Rovers	66–16	Swinton Lions	11 August 2019, 15:00	LD Nutrition Stadium	G. Dolan	2,090
Halifax	18–20	Sheffield Eagles	11 August 2019, 15:00	The MBI Shay	G. Hewer	1,205
Rochdale Hornets	18–50	Leigh Centurions	11 August 2019, 15:00	Crown Oil Arena	B. Pearson	1,019

=== Round 25 ===
Home	Score	Away	Match Information
Home	Score	Away	Date and Time	Venue	Referee	Attendance
Toronto Wolfpack	46–0 (Note: match abandoned after 74 minutes, due to thunder and lightning in the area. As over 60 minutes had been played the result will stand as final.)	Rochdale Hornets	17 August 2019, 18:00	Lamport Stadium	M. Rossleigh	5,769
Toulouse Olympique	46–0	Batley Bulldogs	17 August 2019, 19:00	Stade Ernest-Argeles	B. Pearson	1,895
Dewsbury Rams	10–34	Bradford Bulls	18 August 2019, 15:00	Tetley's Stadium	J. Smith	2,285
Leigh Centurions	34–22	Widnes Vikings	18 August 2019, 15:00	Leigh Sports Village	G. Dolan	3,559
Sheffield Eagles	44–18	Barrow Raiders	18 August 2019, 15:00	Olympic Legacy Park	G. Hewer	677
Swinton Lions	32–12	Halifax	18 August 2019, 15:00	Heywood Road	S. Race	909
York City Knights	22–18	Featherstone Rovers	18 August 2019, 15:00	Bootham Crescent	T. Grant	3,115

=== Round 26 ===
Home	Score	Away	Match Information
Home	Score	Away	Date and Time	Venue	Referee	Attendance
Toulouse Olympique	42–14	Dewsbury Rams	31 August 2019, 14:30	Stade Ernest-Argeles	J. Smith	2,055
Toronto Wolfpack	62–8	Barrow Raiders	31 August 2019, 18:00	Lamport Stadium	A. Moore	7,129
Batley Bulldogs	0–64	Featherstone Rovers	1 September 2019, 15:00	The Foxes Biscuit Stadium	G. Hewer	1,602
Bradford Bulls	30–10	Sheffield Eagles	1 September 2019, 15:00	Odsal Stadium	B. Pearson	7,541
Halifax	58–0	Rochdale Hornets	1 September 2019, 15:00	The Shay	C. Worsley	1,126
Leigh Centurions	23–24	York City Knights	1 September 2019, 15:00	Leigh Sports Village	M. Griffiths	3,408
Widnes Vikings	36–28	Swinton Lions	1 September 2019, 15:00	Select Security Stadium	G. Dolan	3,928

=== Round 27 ===
Home	Score	Away	Match Information
Home	Score	Away	Date and Time	Venue	Referee	Attendance
Featherstone Rovers	24–26	Toulouse Olympique	7 September 2019, 14:30	LD Nutrition Stadium	G. Dolan	2,334
Toronto Wolfpack	46–12	Leigh Centurions	7 September 2019, 18:00	Lamport Stadium	S. Mikalauskas	8,152
Barrow Raiders	24–16	Batley Bulldogs	8 September 2019, 15:00	Craven Park	T. Crashley	1,214
Dewsbury Rams	8–22	Widnes Vikings	8 September 2019, 15:00	Tetley's Stadium	C. Worsley	1,409
Halifax	8–14	York City Knights	8 September 2019, 15:00	The Shay	T. Grant	1,862
Rochdale Hornets	0–82	Bradford Bulls	8 September 2019, 15:00	Crown Oil Arena	J. Smith	1,328
Swinton Lions	48–16	Sheffield Eagles	8 September 2019, 15:00	Heywood Road	B. Pearson	814

== Play-offs ==
=== Elimination and Qualifying Finals ===
Match	Home	Score	Away	Match Information
Match	Home	Score	Away	Date and Time	Venue	Referee	Attendance
QF	Toulouse Olympique	44–6	York City Knights	14 September 2019, 14:00	Stade Ernest-Argeles	G. Dolan	1,132
EF	Leigh Centurions	18-34	Featherstone Rovers	15 September 2019, 18:30	Leigh Sports Village	G. Hewer	2,671

=== Semi-finals ===
Match	Home	Score	Away	Match Information
Match	Home	Score	Away	Date and Time	Venue	Referee	Attendance
SF1	York City Knights	4–30	Featherstone Rovers	21 September 2019	Bootham Crescent	B. Thaler	3,222
SF2	Toronto Wolfpack	40–24	Toulouse Olympique	22 September 2019, 18:30	Lamport Stadium	G. Hewer	9,325

=== Preliminary Final ===
Home	Score	Away	Match Information
Home	Score	Away	Date and Time	Venue	Referee	Attendance
Toulouse Olympique	12–36	Featherstone Rovers	29 September 2019, 18:30	Stade Ernest-Argeles	R. Hicks	1,068

=== Championship play-off final ===
Home	Score	Away	Match Information
Home	Score	Away	Date and Time	Venue	Referee	Attendance
Toronto Wolfpack	24–6	Featherstone Rovers	5 October 2019, 19:30	Lamport Stadium	C. Kendall	9,974
