= 2016 Toulouse Olympique season =

Rugby league season

- League 1 Rank: 1st
- Play-off result: Play-off final winners (Promoted)
- Challenge Cup: 6th Round (lost 40-22 at Wakefield Trinity)
- 2016 record: Wins: 20; draws: 1; losses: 0
- Points scored: For: 990; against: 276

Team information
- Chairman: Bernard Sarrazin
- Head Coach: Sylvain Houles
- Captain: Sébastien Planas
- Stadium: Stade Ernest-Argelès
- High attendance: 3,513 vs. Rochdale Hornets (17 September)

This article details Toulouse Olympique rugby league football club's 2016 season. This was Toulouse's first season back in the English competition since they left at the end of 2011. They competed in League 1. They finished the season on top of the table, but lost the promotion final to Rochdale Hornets who were crowned champions. Toulouse were promoted to the Championship in second place after they successfully came through the play-offs, beating Barrow Raiders in the play-off final. Toulouse also entered the Challenge Cup, reaching the sixth round where they lost to Super League side Wakefield Trinity.

Home matches were played at Stade Ernest-Argelès in Blagnac rather than at Toulouse's historic home ground of Stade Arnauné.

== Results ==
=== Kingstone Press League 1 ===
==== League 1 table ====
Pos	Club	P	W	D	L	For	Ag	Diff	Pts	Qualification
1	Toulouse Olympique	14	13	1	0	702	184	+518	27	League 1 Super 8s
2	Rochdale Hornets	14	12	1	1	547	252	+295	25	League 1 Super 8s
3	York City Knights	14	10	1	3	482	256	+226	21	League 1 Super 8s
4	Doncaster	14	10	0	3	499	304	+195	20	League 1 Super 8s
5	Barrow Raiders	14	9	1	4	529	253	+276	19	League 1 Super 8s
6	Keighley Cougars	14	9	0	5	520	368	+152	18	League 1 Super 8s
7	Hunslet Hawks	14	8	0	6	383	374	+9	16	League 1 Super 8s
8	London Skolars	14	8	0	6	354	376	–22	16	League 1 Super 8s
9	Newcastle Thunder	14	7	1	6	404	368	+36	15	League 1 Shield
10	North Wales Crusaders	14	5	2	7	336	355	–19	12	League 1 Shield
11	Coventry Bears	14	4	1	9	289	460	–171	9	League 1 Shield
12	Gloucestershire All Golds	14	3	0	11	334	479	–145	6	League 1 Shield
13	South Wales Scorpions	14	1	0	13	176	582	–406	2	League 1 Shield
14	Oxford Rugby League	14	1	0	13	176	582	–406	2	League 1 Shield
15	Hemel Stags	14	1	0	13	190	718	–528	2	League 1 Shield

==== League 1 results ====
W Win D Draw L Loss

Date	Round	Versus	H/A	Venue	Result	Score	Tries	Goals	Attendance	Footage	Report
5 March 2016	1	Coventry Bears	H	Stade Ernest-Argelès	W	54-6	Hulme 4, Kriouache, Maurel, White, Kheirallah 2	Kheirallah 9C	-	Match	
12 March 2016	2	Hemel Stags	H	Stade Ernest-Argelès	W	74-0	Maurel 2, Minga 2, Hulme, Ader, Masselot, Kheirallah 3, Hepi 2, White 2	Kheirallah 9C	—	Match	
25 March 2016	3	Bye									
10 April 2016	4	South Wales Scorpions	A	Virginia Park (Caerphilly)	W	64-0	Gonzalez-Trique 2, Ford, Minga 4, Marguerite, Canet, Maurel, K Bentley, Kheirallah	Kheirallah 8C	—	Highlights	
24 April 2016	6	Rochdale Hornets	A	Spotland	D	28-28	Curran 3, Minga, White	Kheirallah 4C	536	Match	
30 April 2016	5	Oxford Rugby League	H	Stade Ernest-Argelès	W	54-8	K Bentley, Boyer, White, Curran, Marguerite, Gonzalez-Trigue, Maurel, Kriouache, Masselot, Marcon	Kheirallah 7C	1,211	Match	
15 May 2016	8	Hunslet Hawks	A	South Leeds Stadium	W	46-24	Maurel 3, Margurite, Minga, Curran, Kheirallah 2, Ford	Kheirallah 5C	—	Match	
22 May 2016	9	Barrow Raiders	A	Craven Park	W	44-16	Curran, Canet, Minga 2, Kheirallah 2, Ford, Maurel	Kheirallah 6C	1,050	Match	
28 May 2016	7	Gloucestershire All Golds	H	Stade Ernest-Argelès	W	48-16	Curran, Minga 2, Hulme, Kriouache 2, White, Ford	Kheirallah 5C, Kriouache 3C	1.335	Match	
4 June 2016	10	Doncaster	H	Stade Ernest-Argelès	W	46-26	Canet, Minga, Maurel, Curran, Hulme 2, White, Marion	Kheirallah 7C	-	Match	
11 June 2016	11	Newcastle Thunder	A	Kingston Park	W	32-22	Ader 2, Hulme 2, Marion 2	Kheirallah 4C	-	Match	
18 June 2016	12	Keighley Cougars	H	Stade Ernest-Argelès	W	84-6	Minga, Kheirallah 4, Planas, Boyer 2, Ader 2, Kriouache 2, Maurel, Hulme, Marion	Kheirallah 12C	2,167	Match	
26 June 2016	13	North Wales Crusaders	A	Racecourse Ground	W	32-14	Minga 2, Kriouache, Ford, Kheirallah, Planas	Kheirallah 4C	-	Match	
2 July 2016	14	York City Knights	H	Stade Ernest-Argelès	W	44-6	Canet 2, Planas 2, Curran, Mika, Minga 2	Kheirallah 6C	2,873	Match	
9 July 2016	15	London Skolars	A	New River Stadium	W	52-12	Canet 2, White, Minga, Masselot, Curran 2, Hepi, K Bentley	Kheirallah 8C	-	Match	

=== Super 8s ===
==== Super 8s table ====
Pos	Club	P	W	D	L	For	Ag	Diff	Pts	Qualification
1	Toulouse Olympique	21	20	1	0	990	276	+714	41	Promotion Final
2	Rochdale Hornets	21	16	1	4	709	440	+269	33	Promotion Final
3	Barrow Raiders	21	15	1	5	769	375	+394	31	Playoffs
4	Doncaster	21	14	0	7	683	526	+157	28	Playoffs
5	York City Knights	21	12	1	8	618	461	+157	25	Playoffs
6	Keighley Cougars	21	11	0	10	658	514	+144	22	Season Complete
7	Hunslet Hawks	21	11	0	10	544	550	–6	22	Season Complete
8	London Skolars	21	8	0	13	470	650	–180	16	Season Complete

==== Super 8s results ====
W Win D Draw L Loss

Date	Round	Versus	H/A	Venue	Result	Score	Tries	Goals	Attendance	Footage	Report
23 July 2016	1	Keighley Cougars	H	Stade Ernest-Argelès	W	40-4	Marion, Ader, Canet, White, Maurel, Hulme, Curran	Kheirallah 5C, White	1,214	Match	
30 July 2016	2	York City Knights	H	Stade Ernest-Argelès	W	46-16	Hulme, Puech, Minga 2, Curran, White, Boyer, Canet	Kheirallah 7C	-	Match	
14 August 2016	4	Doncaster R.L.F.C.	A	Keepmoat Stadium	W	38-18	Minga, Curran 3, Ford, Hepi, Kheirallah	Kheirallah 5C	-	Match	
20 August 2016	5	Rochdale Hornets	H	Stade Ernest-Argelès	W	46-6	Kheirallah, Minga 3, Maurel, Hulme, Planas	Kheirallah 7C	1,842	Match	
26 August 2016	3	London Skolars	A	New River Stadium	W	58-14	Marguerite 3, Minga, Kheirallah 4, Ford, Maurel, Mika	Kheirallah 7C	-	Match	
3 September 2016	6	Hunslet Hawks	A	South Leeds Stadium	W	16-12	Minga, Maurel, Hulme	Kheirallah 2C	-	Match	
10 September 2016	7	Barrow Raiders	H	Stade Ernest-Argelès	W	44-22	K Bentley, White, Minga, Boyer, Hulme, Mika 2, Canet	Kheirallah 6C	-	Match	

=== Play-offs ===
W Win D Draw L Loss

Date	Round	Versus	H/A	Venue	Result	Score	Tries	Goals	Attendance	Footage	Report
17 September 2016	PF	Rochdale Hornets	H	Stade Ernest-Argelès	L	22-24	Canet, Curran, White, Ader	Kheirallah 3C	3,513	Match	
24 September 2016	PO SF	York City Knights	H	Stade Ernest-Argelès	W	62-10	Maurel 2, K Bentley, Kheirallah 2, Minga 2, Curran, Marguerite 2, Ferret	Kheirallah 9C	2,000 est	Match	
1 October 2016	PO F	Barrow Raiders	H	Stade Ernest-Argelès	W	32-22	Maurel, Marguerite, Hulme, Minga, Kheirallah	Kheirallah 6C	-	Match	

==== Play-off bracket ====
Promotion Final
1	Toulouse Olympique	22
2	Rochdale Hornets	24

Play-off semi-finals
Toulouse Olympique	62
5	York City Knights	10
3	Barrow Raiders	46
4	Doncaster	6

Play-off final
Toulouse Olympique	32
Barrow Raiders	22

Rochdale Hornets and Toulouse Olympique are promoted

=== Challenge Cup ===
Toulouse entered the Challenge Cup in Round 3. They were drawn away to face Cumbrian amateur side Wath Brow Hornets, winning 32–14. In Round 4, Toulouse defeated fellow League 1 side Gloucestershire All Golds 62–28 in France. In Round 5 they beat Championship side Leigh Centurions 10–8 at Stade Ernest-Argeles before bowing out at Super League side Wakefield Trinity, losing 40–22.

W Win D Draw L Loss

Date	Round	Versus	H/A	Venue	Result	Score	Tries	Goals	Attendance	Footage	Report
27 February 2016	Round 3	Wath Brow Hornets	A	Cleator Moor	W	32-14	Kheirallah 4, Ford, Minga	Mark Kheirallah 4C	400 est	Match	
19 March 2016	Round 4	Gloucestershire All Golds	H	Stade Ernest-Argeles	W	62-28	Kheirallah 3, Ford 2, White, Canet, Kriouache, Maurel, Minga, Boyer	Kheirallah 9C	1,053	Match	
16 April 2016	Round 5	Leigh Centurions	H	Stade Ernest-Argeles	W	10-8	Canet	Kheirallah 1C 2P	2,133	Match	
8 May 2016	Round 6	Wakefield Trinity	A	Belle Vue	L	40-22	Marguerite, Kriouache, Hulme, Minga	Kheirallah 3C	2,539	Match	

== Players ==
=== Player appearances - League ===
FB = Fullback	C = Centre	W = Winger	SO = Stand Off	SH = Scrum half	P = Prop	H = Hooker	SR = Second Row	LF = Loose forward	I = Interchange

No	Player	1	2	4	6	5	8	9	7	10	11	12	13	14	15	S8 1	S8 2	S8 4	S8 5	S8 3	S8 6	S8 7	PR F	PO SF	PO F
1	Mark Kheirallah	FB	FB	FB	FB	FB	FB	FB	FB	FB	FB	FB	FB	FB	FB	FB	FB	FB	FB	FB	FB	FB	FB	FB	FB
2	Tony Maurel	W	W	W	W	W	W	W	W	W	W	W	W	W	W	W	W	W	W	W	W	W	W	W	W
3	Bastien Ader	C	C	-	C	-	-	-	-	C	C	C	C	C	-	C	C	C	C	C	C	C	C	-	-
4	Gregory White	C	C	C	C	C	C	C	C	C	C	C	-	C	C	C	C	-	-	-	I	C	C	C	C
5	Kuni Minga	W	W	W	W	-	W	W	W	W	W	W	W	W	W	W	W	W	W	W	W	W	W	W	W
6	Johnathon Ford	SO	SO	SO	SO	SO	SO	SO	SO	SO	SO	SO	SO	SO	SO	-	SO	SO	SO	SO	SO	SO	SO	SO	SO
7	Arthur Gonzalez-Trique	-	-	SH	SH	SH	SH	SH	-	-	I	-	-	-	-	-	-	-	-	-	-	-	-	-	-
8	Clément Boyer	-	I	P	P	P	SR	SR	SR	SR	P	LF	LF	LF	P	P	P	P	P	SR	P	SR	P	P	P
9	Kane Bentley	I	-	I	H	H	H	H	H	H	-	-	-	H	H	H	H	-	H	-	-	H	H	H	H
10	Samy Masselot	I	I	-	I	I	I	I	P	-	-	P	P	-	I	-	-	-	P	P	P	-	-	I	I
11	Sebastien Planas	SR	SR	SR	SR	SR	-	-	-	-	SR	SR	SR	SR	SR	SR	SR	SR	SR	SR	SR	SR	SR	SR	SR
12	Rhys Curran	SR	SR	SR	SR	SR	SR	SR	SR	SR	SR	SR	SR	SR	SR	SR	SR	SR	SR	-	-	-	SR	SR	SR
13	Andrew Bentley	LF	-	LF	LF	-	-	-	-	-	-	-	-	-	-	-	-	-	-	-	-	-	-	-	-
14	Mourad Kriouache	H	H	H	I	I	I	I	I	I	H	I	I	I	I	I	I	H	I	-	I	I	I	I	I
15	Maxime Puech	P	P	I	-	I	I	P	P	P	I	P	P	P	-	I	I	P	-	P	-	P	I	-	-
16	Bastien Canet	P	P	P	P	P	P	P	-	P	P	-	-	P	P	P	P	I	-	-	-	P	P	P	P
17	Anthony Marion	I	LF	I	-	LF	LF	LF	LF	LF	LF	H	H	-	LF	LF	LF	I	I	H	H	LF	I	LF	LF
18	Tyla Hepi	I	I	I	I	I	P	-	I	I	I	I	I	I	I	I	I	I	I	I	I	I	I	I	I
19	Etienne Ferret	-	-	-	-	-	-	-	-	-	-	-	-	-	SH	SH	-	SH	-	SH	-	-	-	SH	-
20	Paul Marcon	-	-	-	-	W	-	-	-	-	-	-	-	-	-	-	-	-	-	-	-	-	-	-	-
21	Gavin Marguerite	-	-	C	-	C	C	C	C	I	-	-	C	-	C	-	-	C	C	C	C	-	-	C	C
21a	Christopher Denis	-	I	-	-	-	-	-	-	-	-	-	-	-	-	-	-	-	-	I	-	-	-	-	-
22	Danny Hulme	SH	SH	-	I	-	-	-	SH	SH	SH	SH	SH	SH	-	SO	SH	-	SH	-	SH	SH	SH	-	SH
23	Cédric Mazars	-	-	-	-	-	-	I	I	-	-	-	-	-	-	-	-	-	-	-	SR	-	-	-	-
24	Kalausa Leha	-	-	-	-	-	-	-	I	I	I	I	I	I	-	-	-	I	I	I	-	I	-	-	-
25	Justin Sangaré	-	-	-	-	-	I	I	-	-	-	I	I	-	-	-	-	-	-	I	I	-	-	-	-
26	Constantine Mika	-	-	-	-	-	-	-	-	-	-	-	-	I	I	I	I	LF	LF	LF	LF	I	LF	I	I

=== Player appearances - Cup ===
FB = Fullback	C = Centre	W = Winger	SO = Stand Off	SH = Scrum half	P = Prop	H = Hooker	SR = Second Row	LF = Loose forward	I = Interchange

No	Player	3	4	5	6
1	Mark Kheirallah	FB	FB	FB	FB
2	Tony Maurel	W	W	W	W
3	Bastien Ader	C	C	C	-
4	Gregory White	C	C	C	C
5	Kuni Minga	W	W	W	W
6	Johnathon Ford	SO	SO	SH	SO
7	Arthur Gonzalez-Trique	-	-	SO	-
8	Clemont Boyer	-	I	P	P
9	Kane Bentley	I	H	H	H
10	Samy Masselot	I	I	I	I
11	Sebastien Planas	SR	SR	SR	SR
12	Rhys Curran	SR	SR	SR	SR
13	Andrew Bentley	LF	LF	LF	-
14	Murrad Kriouache	H	I	I	I
15	Maxime Puech	P	P	I	I
16	Bastien Canet	P	P	P	P
17	Anthony Marion	I	I	I	LF
18	Tyla Hepi	I	-	-	I
21	Gavin Marguerite	-	-	-	C
22	Danny Hulme	SH	SH	-	SH

=== 2016 transfers ===
Gains

Player	Club	Contract	Date
(Australia) Rhys Curran	Villeneuve XIII RLLG	-	-
(France) Bastien Canet	AS Carcassonne	-	-
(New Zealand) Tyla Hepi	Whitehaven R.L.F.C.	-	-

Losses

Player	Club	Date
(France) Bruno Ormeno	Retired	-
(Australia) Aaron Wood	Released	-
(France) Florian Quintilla	Released	-
