= 2019 RFL Championship =

- League: Championship
- Duration: 27 rounds + play-offs
- Teams: 14
- Highest attendance: 9,974; Toronto Wolfpack v Featherstone Rovers (5 October 2019)
- Lowest attendance: 337; Rochdale Hornets v Toulouse Olympique (13 July 2019)
- Average attendance: 2,645
- Attendance: 428,570; as of round 26 (1 September 2019)
- Broadcast partners: Sky Sports

2019 season
- Champions: Toronto Wolfpack
- League Leaders' Shield: Toronto Wolfpack
- Runners-up: Featherstone Rovers
- Biggest home win: Toronto Wolfpack 70–8 Dewsbury Rams (15 June 2019)
- Biggest away win: Rochdale Hornets 0–82 Bradford Bulls (8 September 2019)

Promotion and relegation
- Promoted from RFL Championship: Toronto Wolfpack
- Relegated to League 1: Barrow Raiders; Rochdale Hornets

The 2019 Rugby Football League Championship was a rugby league football competition played primarily in England but including teams from Canada and France. It is the second tier of the three tiers of professional rugby league in England, below Super League and above League 1. Following rule changes agreed at the end of the 2018 season, the Super 8's format has been abandoned and the Championship will feature a play-off system leading to promotion to Super League for one club while results during the regular season will lead to relegation to League 1 for two teams.

The 2019 Championship comprised 14 teams, which all played one another twice in the regular season, once at home and once away, totalling 26 games. The 2019 season also featured the "Summer Bash Weekend" for a fifth time so the regular season comprised 27 games for each team.

The Championship Grand Final was won by Toronto Wolfpack, who by beating Featherstone Rovers 24–6 also won promotion to Super League for the first time in the club's history, ahead of 2020 season. Toronto also won the RFL Championship Leaders' Shield, after finishing top of the league and completing a 100% home record, and only losing 1 game all season.

Betfred remain the sponsors of the Championship. The season started on 3 February 2019.

== Teams ==
The Championship is made up of 14 teams, 11 of whom featured in the 2018 Championship; one, Widnes Vikings, who were relegated from Super League; and two, Bradford Bulls and York City Knights, who won promotion from League 1 in 2018.

Locations of the 2019 RFL Championship teams
Locations of 2019 RFL Championship teams
Locations of 2019 RFL Championship teams
Locations of the 2019 RFL Championship teams in West Yorkshire

Team	Stadium	Capacity	Location
Barrow Raiders	The JF Hornby Stadium	7,600	Barrow-in-Furness, Cumbria
Batley Bulldogs	Fox's Biscuits Stadium	7,500	Batley, West Yorkshire
Bradford Bulls	Odsal Stadium	27,500	Bradford, West Yorkshire
Dewsbury Rams	Tetley's Stadium	5,800	Dewsbury, West Yorkshire
Featherstone Rovers	LD Nutrition Stadium	8,000	Featherstone, West Yorkshire
Halifax	The MBi Shay	14,000	Halifax, West Yorkshire
Leigh Centurions	Leigh Sports Village	12,000	Leigh, Greater Manchester
Rochdale Hornets	Crown Oil Arena	10,249	Rochdale, Greater Manchester
Sheffield Eagles	Sheffield Olympic Legacy Stadium	2,500	Sheffield, South Yorkshire
Swinton Lions	Heywood Road	3,387	Sale, Greater Manchester
Toronto Wolfpack	Lamport Stadium	9,600	Toronto, Canada
Toulouse Olympique	Stade Ernest-Argelès	4,000	Toulouse, France
Widnes Vikings	Halton Stadium	13,350	Widnes, Cheshire
York City Knights	Bootham Crescent	8,256	York, North Yorkshire

== Final standings ==
Final standings at the end of regular season on 8 September 2019

Pos	Team	Pld	W	D	L	PF	PA	PD	Pts	Qualification
1	Toronto Wolfpack	27	26	0	1	1010	356	+654	52	Play-off semi-final
2	Toulouse Olympique	27	20	0	7	877	446	+431	40	Play-off qualifying final
3	York City Knights	27	19	1	7	612	529	+83	39	Play-off qualifying final
4	Leigh Centurions	27	18	0	9	792	558	+234	36	Play-off elimination final
5	Featherstone Rovers	27	17	0	10	837	471	+366	34	Play-off elimination final
6	Bradford Bulls	27	16	1	10	717	522	+195	33	
7	Sheffield Eagles	27	15	0	12	748	694	+54	30	
8	Halifax	27	10	1	16	602	685	−83	21	
9	Swinton Lions	27	10	1	16	619	803	−184	21	
10	Batley Bulldogs	27	8	1	18	462	756	−294	17	
11	Widnes Vikings	27	14	0	13	646	586	+60	16 (Note: Widnes deducted 12 points for going into administration.)	
12	Dewsbury Rams	27	6	2	19	513	721	−208	14	
13	Barrow Raiders	27	5	1	21	479	861	−382	11	Relegated to League 1
14	Rochdale Hornets	27	1	0	26	342	1268	−926	2	Relegated to League 1

== Play-offs ==
At the end of the 27 game regular season, the top five teams enter a four-round play-off. The winners of the play-off final will earn promotion to Super League for 2020.

Qualifying play-off
2	Toulouse Olympique	44
3	York City Knights	6
4	Leigh Centurions	18
5	Featherstone Rovers	34

Qualifying semi-final
1	Toronto Wolfpack	40
Toulouse Olympique	24
Elimination semi-final
York City Knights	4
Featherstone Rovers	30

Preliminary final
Toulouse Olympique	12
Featherstone Rovers	36

Play-off final
Toronto Wolfpack	24
Featherstone Rovers	6

== End-of-season awards ==
The end of season awards ceremony was held on 24 September 2019 when the following awards were made:

- Club Of The Year: York City Knights
- Outstanding Achievement Award: Micky Higham, Oliver Wilkes
- Coach Of The Year: James Ford
- Young Player Of The Year: Matty Ashton
- Player Of The Year: Gareth O'Brien
