= 2014 RFL Championship season results =

This is a list of the 2014 RFL Championship season results. The Championship is the second-tier rugby league competition in the United Kingdom. The 2014 season started on 16 February and ends on 5 October with the Grand Final at a venue to be announced. 2014 is the second and final season to consist of a 14-team division, with the league being reduced to 12 teams in 2015 as part of the Rugby Football League's reform of the leagues.

The 2014 season consists of two stages. The regular season was played over 26 round-robin fixtures, in which each of the fourteen teams involved in the competition played each other once at home and once away. In the Championship, a win was worth three points in the table, a draw worth two points apiece, and a loss by less than 12 points during the game earned one bonus point. Defeats by more than 12 points yielded no points.

The Championship will be decided through the second stage of the season, the play-offs, which has been re-structured following the expansion. The play-offs now adopts the 8-team play-off, similar to what is used in the Super League with the top eight teams in the table contest to play in the Grand Final, the winners of which will be crowned champions. A decision whether to use the club-call system, as used in Super League, will be taken during the regular season.

== Regular season ==
=== Round 1 ===
| Home | Score | Away | Match Information |
| Home | Score | Away | Date and Time | Venue | Referee | Attendance |
|---|---|---|---|---|---|---|
| North Wales Crusaders | 34 – 16 | Barrow Raiders | 16 February, 14:30 GMT | Racecourse Ground | Gareth Hewer | 1,118 |
| Dewsbury Rams | 11 – 10 | Featherstone Rovers | 16 February, 15:00 GMT | Tetley's Stadium | Chris Leatherbarrow | 2,096 |
| Halifax | 28 – 18 | Swinton Lions | 16 February, 15:00 GMT | The Shay | Joe Cobb | 1,750 |
| Keighley Cougars | 36 – 14 | Whitehaven | 16 February, 15:00 GMT | Cougar Park | George Stokes | 1,061 |
| Leigh Centurions | 52 – 12 | Batley Bulldogs | 16 February, 15:00 GMT | Leigh Sports Village | Matt Thomason |
| Sheffield Eagles | P – P | Rochdale Hornets | TBA^{A} | Owlerton Stadium |
| Workington Town | 12 – 22 | Doncaster | 16 February, 15:00 GMT | Derwent Park | Jamie Bloem | 895 |

=== Round 2 ===
| Home | Score | Away | Match Information |
| Home | Score | Away | Date and Time | Venue | Referee | Attendance |
|---|---|---|---|---|---|---|
| Barrow Raiders | 8 – 52 | Leigh Centurions | 23 February, 14:00 GMT | Craven Park | C Leatherbarrow | 1,252 |
| Batley Bulldogs | 36 – 16 | Workington Town | 23 February, 14:00 GMT | Mount Pleasant |
| Doncaster | 30 – 12 | Keighley Cougars | 23 February, 15:00 GMT | Keepmoat Stadium | G Hewer | 647 |
| Featherstone Rovers | 28 – 20 | Halifax | 23 February, 15:00 GMT | Bigfellas Stadium | M Thomason | 2,583 |
| Rochdale Hornets | 12 – 42 | Dewsbury Rams | 23 February, 15:00 GMT | Spotland Stadium | J Bloem | 817 |
| Swinton Lions | 16 – 30 | Workington Town | 23 February, 15:00 GMT | Leigh Sports Village | W Turley | 548 |
| Whitehaven | 0 – 34 | North Wales Crusaders | 27 April, 15:00 GMT | Recreation Ground |

=== Notes ===
A. Game postponed due to waterlogged pitch
