= 2020 RFL Championship =

- League: Championship
- Duration: Planned: 27 rounds + play-offs Actual: 5 rounds
- Teams: 14
- Broadcast partners: Sky Sports

2020 season

The 2020 Rugby Football League Championship is a rugby league football competition played primarily in England but including a team from France. It is the second tier of the three tiers of professional rugby league in England, below Super League and above League 1. Following rule changes agreed at the end of the 2018 season, the Super 8's format was abandoned and the Championship was to have featured a play-off system leading to promotion to Super League for one club while results during the regular season would have led to relegation to League 1 for two teams.

The 2020 Championship comprised 14 teams, which all played one another twice in the regular season, once at home and once away, totalling 26 games. The 2020 season would also have featured the "Summer Bash Weekend" for a sixth time so the regular season totals 27 games for each team.

On 16 March the structure and timing of the competition were placed in doubt as all rugby league games were suspended until 3 April at least as part of the United Kingdom's response to the coronavirus pandemic. The suspension of the season was extended to indefinite.

A discussion between the RFL and club officials in May saw a majority of the Championship clubs reject a suggestion that the season could recommence with games being played behind closed doors. The RFL board met on 20 July and having consulted with the clubs decided to abandon the 2020 season as the majority of clubs did not support playing behind closed doors. The RFL also confirmed that there would be no promotion or relegation between the Championship and Super League in 2020 and the season was declared null and void.

== Teams ==
The Championship is made up of 14 teams, 11 of whom featured in the 2019 Championship; one, London Broncos, who were relegated from Super League; and two, Whitehaven and Oldham, who won promotion from League 1 in 2019. At the end of the 2019 season Bradford Bulls moved out of their Odsal ground and for 2020 agreed a ground share deal with Dewsbury Rams at the Rams' Tetley's Stadium.

Locations of the 2020 RFL Championship teams
Locations of 2020 RFL Championship teams
Locations of the 2019 RFL Championship teams in West Yorkshire

Team	Stadium	Capacity	Location
Batley Bulldogs	Fox's Biscuits Stadium	7,500	Batley, West Yorkshire
Bradford Bulls	Tetley's Stadium	5,800	Dewsbury, West Yorkshire
Dewsbury Rams	Tetley's Stadium	5,800	Dewsbury, West Yorkshire
Featherstone Rovers	LD Nutrition Stadium	8,000	Featherstone, West Yorkshire
Halifax	The MBi Shay	14,000	Halifax, West Yorkshire
Leigh Centurions	Leigh Sports Village	12,000	Leigh, Greater Manchester
London Broncos	Trailfinders Sports Ground	4,000	Ealing, London
Oldham	Bower Fold	6,500	Stalybridge, Greater Manchester
Sheffield Eagles	Sheffield Olympic Legacy Stadium	2,500	Sheffield, South Yorkshire
Swinton Lions	Heywood Road	3,387	Sale, Greater Manchester
Toulouse Olympique	Stade Ernest-Wallon	19,500	Toulouse, France
Whitehaven	Recreation Ground	7,500	Whitehaven, Cumbria
Widnes Vikings	Halton Stadium	13,350	Widnes, Cheshire
York City Knights	Bootham Crescent	8,256	York, North Yorkshire

== Regular season results ==
=== Round 1 ===
Home	Score	Away	Match Information
Home	Score	Away	Date and Time (GMT)	Venue	Referee	Attendance
Dewsbury Rams	10–36	Leigh Centurions	31 January 2020, 19:30	Tetley's Stadium	Cameron Worsley	1,723
Toulouse Olympique	22–10	York City Knights	1 February 2020, 18:00	Stade Ernest-Argeles	Marcus Griffiths	3,151
Batley Bulldogs	18–38	Featherstone Rovers	2 February 2020, 15:00	The Fox's Biscuit Stadium	Tom Grant	1,795
Bradford Bulls	14–18	London Broncos	2 February 2020, 15:00	Tetley's Stadium	Aaron Moore	2,697
Halifax	18–17	Sheffield Eagles	2 February 2020, 15:00	The MBI Shay	Billy Pearson	1,525
Oldham Roughyeds	6–36	Widnes Vikings	2 February 2020, 15:00	Bower Fold	Jack Smith	1,726
Whitehaven RLFC	0–14	Swinton Lions	2 February 2020, 15:00	Recreation Ground	Gareth Hewer	803

=== Round 2 ===
Home	Score	Away	Match Information
Home	Score	Away	Date and Time (GMT)	Venue	Referee	Attendance
Leigh Centurions	58–10	Sheffield Eagles	8 February 2020, 15:00	Leigh Sports Village	Michael Mannifield	3,104
Toulouse Olympique	58–6	Oldham Roughyeds	8 February 2020, 18:00	Stade Ernest-Wallon	Aaron Moore	2,318
London Broncos	36–20	Whitehaven RLFC	9 February 2020, 15:00	Trailfinders Sports Ground	Matthew Rossleigh	735
Widnes Vikings	32–12	Batley Bulldogs	9 February 2020, 15:00	Select Security Stadium	Tom Grant	3,577
Featherstone Rovers		Halifax RLFC	TBC (Note: Match postponed on original date due to poor weather conditions caused by Storm Ciara)
Swinton Lions		Dewsbury Rams	TBC
York City Knights		Bradford Bulls	TBC

=== Round 3 ===
Home	Score	Away	Match Information
Home	Score	Away	Date and Time (GMT)	Venue	Referee	Attendance
Batley Bulldogs	20–10	Swinton Lions	16 February 2020, 15:00	The Fox's Biscuit Stadium	Billy Pearson	746
Bradford Bulls	22–30	Featherstone Rovers	16 February 2020, 15:00	Tetley's Stadium	Matthew Rossleigh	3,640
Leigh Centurions	34–0	York City Knights	16 February 2020, 15:00	Leigh Sports Village	Scott Mikalauskua	2,942
Sheffield Eagles	14–26	Toulouse Olympique	16 February 2020, 15:00	Castle Park	Aaron Moore	618
Widnes Vikings	12–38	London Broncos	16 February 2020, 15:00	Select Security Stadium	Jack Smith	3,680
Whitehaven RLFC	14–16	Oldham Roughyeds	16 February 2020, 18:15	Recreation Ground	Michael Mannifield	532
Dewsbury Rams	18–16	Swinton Lions	18 February 2020, 19:45	The MBI Shay	Cameron Worsley	1,151

=== Round 4 ===
Home	Score	Away	Match Information
Home	Score	Away	Date and Time (GMT)	Venue	Referee	Attendance
Batley Bulldogs	18–19 (Note: after golden-point extra time)	Sheffield Eagles	1 March 2020, 15:00	The Fox's Biscuit Stadium
Halifax RLFC	28–4	York City Knights	1 March 2020, 15:00	The MBI Shay
London Broncos	10–34	Featherstone Rovers	1 March 2020, 15:00	Trailfinders Sports Ground
Oldham Roughyeds	12–26	Bradford Bulls	1 March 2020, 15:00	Bower Fold
Whitehaven RLFC	4–40	Toulouse Olympique	1 March 2020, 15:00	Recreation Ground
Dewsbury Rams	20–8	Widnes Vikings	1 March 2020, 18:15	Tetley's Stadium
Swinton Lions		Leigh Centurions	TBC (Note: original match on 1 March, postponed due to a water-logged pitch)

=== Round 5 ===
Home	Score	Away	Match Information
Home	Score	Away	Date and Time (GMT)	Venue	Referee	Attendance
Toulouse Olympique	34–14	Batley Bulldogs	7 March 2020, 18:00	Stade Ernest-Wallon
Featherstone Rovers	35–24	Swinton Lions	8 March 2020, 15:00	LD Nutrition Stadium
Leigh Centurions	34–20	Halifax RLFC	8 March 2020, 15:00	Leigh Sports Village
Oldham Roughyeds	6–24	Dewsbury Rams	8 March 2020, 15:00	Bower Fold
Widnes Vikings	40–16	Whitehaven RLFC	8 March 2020, 15:00	Select Security Stadium
York City Knights	12–18	London Broncos	8 March 2020, 15:00	Bootham Crescent		1,364
Bradford Bulls	28–0	Sheffield Eagles	8 March 2020, 18:15

== Standings at time of abandonment ==
Pos	Team	Pld	W	D	L	PF	PA	PD	BP	Pts
1	Toulouse Olympique	5	5	0	0	180	48	+132	0	10
2	Leigh Centurions	4	4	0	0	162	40	+122	0	8
3	Featherstone Rovers	4	4	0	0	137	74	+63	0	8
4	London Broncos	5	4	0	1	120	92	+28	0	8
5	Widnes Vikings	5	3	0	2	128	92	+36	0	6
6	Dewsbury Rams	4	3	0	1	72	66	+6	0	6
7	Bradford Bulls	4	2	0	2	90	60	+30	0	4
8	Halifax	4	2	0	2	82	73	+9	0	4
9	Batley Bulldogs	5	1	0	4	82	133	−51	1	3
10	Swinton Lions	3	1	0	2	48	55	−7	0	2
11	Sheffield Eagles	5	1	0	4	60	148	−88	0	2
12	Oldham	5	1	0	4	46	158	−112	0	2
13	York City Knights	4	0	0	4	26	102	−76	0	0
14	Whitehaven	5	0	0	5	54	146	−92	0	0

Updated to match(es) played on 8 March 2020. Season abandoned on 20 July 2020.. Source:
