= Rhys Curran =

France international rugby league footballer

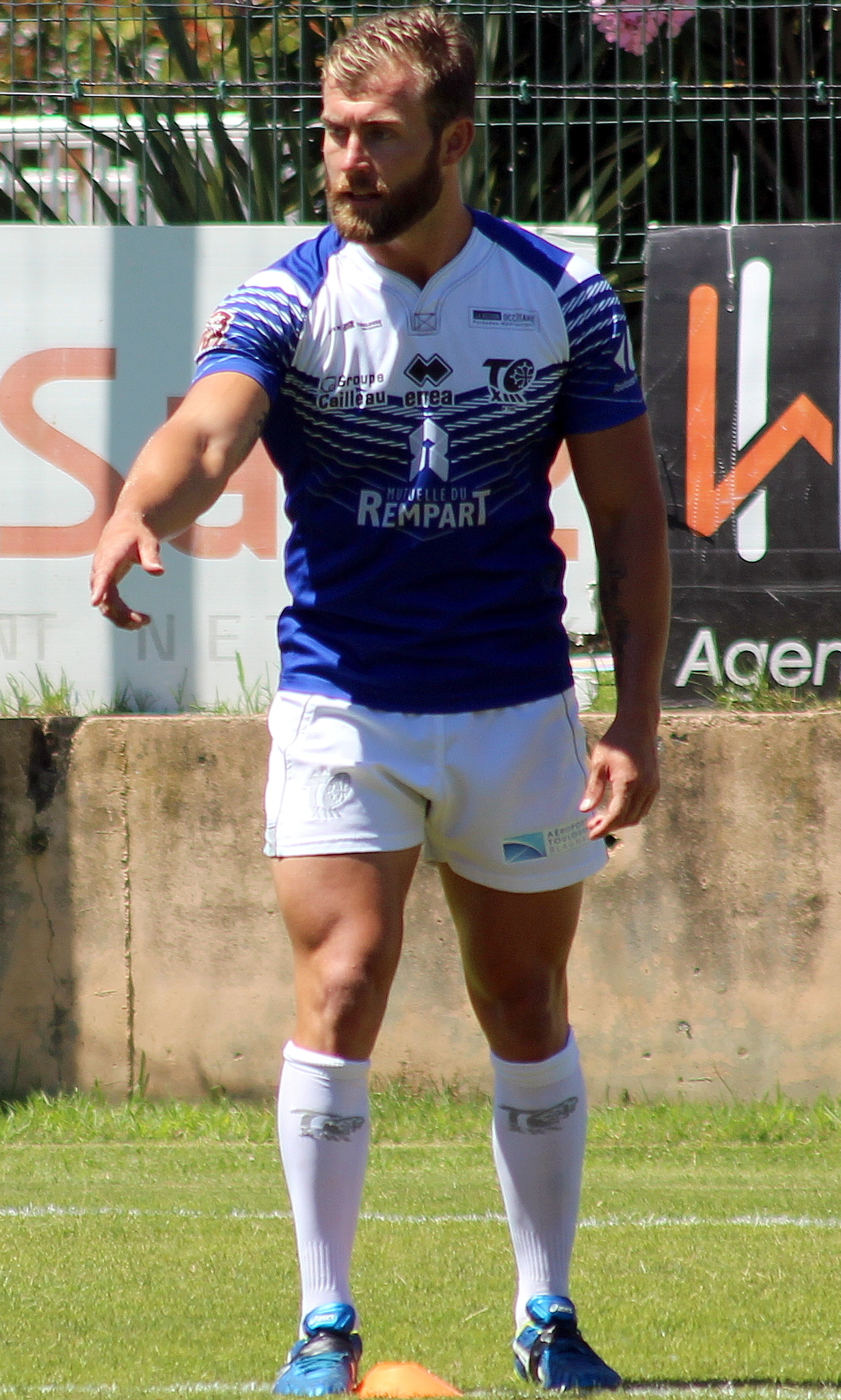

Personal information
- Full name: Rhys Michael Curran
- Born: 7 July 1989 (age 37) Darlinghurst, New South Wales, Australia
- Height: 6 ft 1 in (1.86 m)
- Weight: 16 st 1 lb (102 kg)

Playing information
- Position: Second-row, Loose forward, Prop
Club
Years	Team	Pld	T	G	FG	P
2012–15	Villeneuve	40	15	0	0	60
2015–19	Toulouse Olympique	116	67	0	0	268
2020–	London Broncos	39	10	0	0	40
	Total	195	92	0	0	368
Representative
Years	Team	Pld	T	G	FG	P
2018–	France	3	1	0	0	4
- Source: As of 14 September 2022

Rhys Curran (born 7 July 1989) is a France international rugby league footballer who plays as a second-row forward for the London Broncos in the Championship.

He previously played for Villeneuve in the Elite One Championship, and Toulouse Olympique in League 1 and the Championship.

== Background ==
Curran was born Darlinghurst, New South Wales, Australia and grew up on the Central Coast of New South Wales.

He only started playing rugby league at the age of 16, but went through the youth systems at the Wests Tigers. He played for his local club, winning the under 19s competition with the Erina Eagles in 2007.

== Career ==
=== Wests Tigers ===
Curran played in the Toyota Cup for the Wests Tigers and was elevated to the Tigers NRL squad in 2009, but did not feature in first grade. He featured extensively for Wests in the NSW Cup competition.

=== Villeneuve ===
He left Australia in 2012 and began his playing career in France at Villeneuve.

=== Toulouse Olympique ===
Curran joined Toulouse Olympique ahead of their entry into the English rugby league pyramid, joining the French club from the 2016 League 1 season.

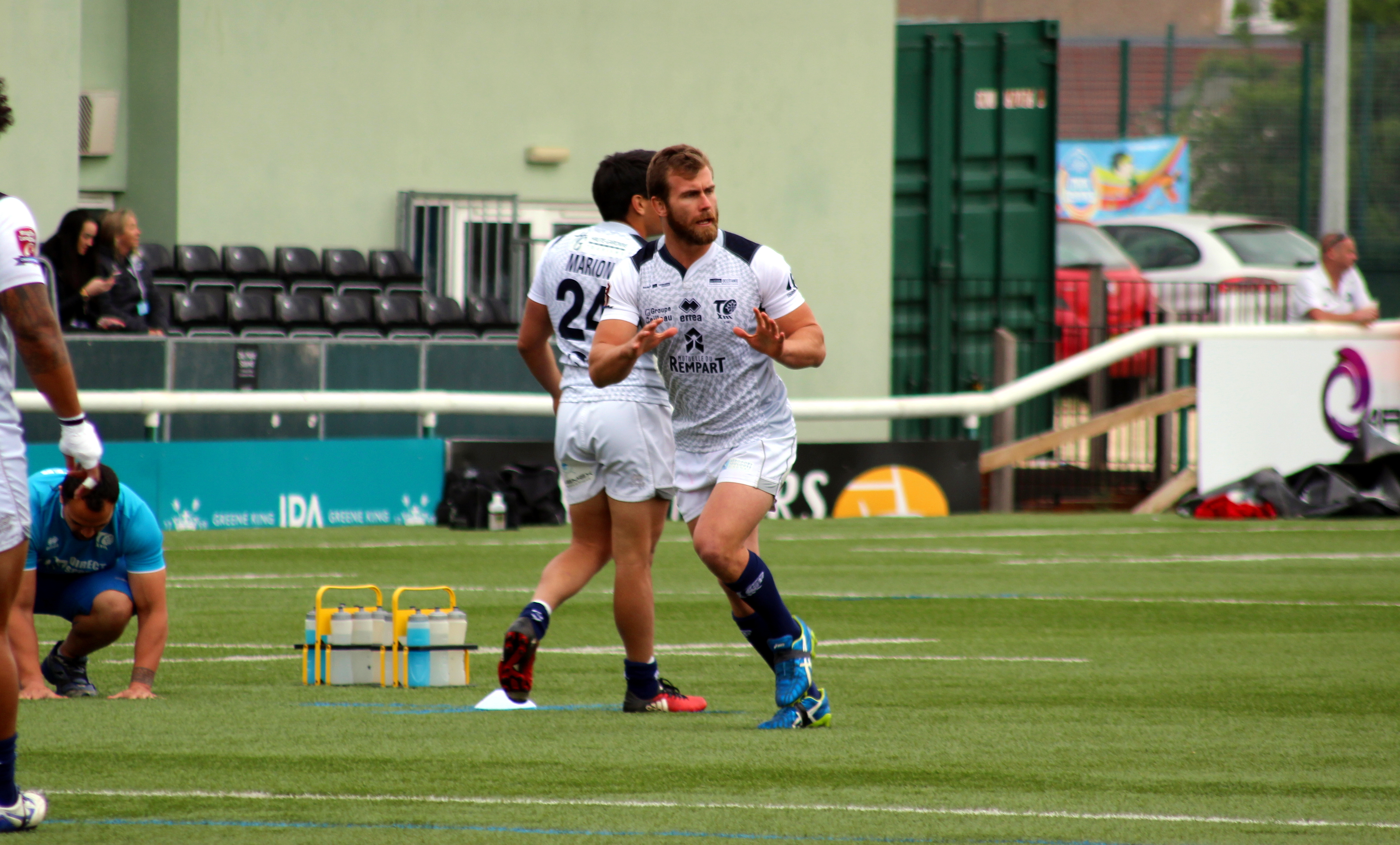
Curran playing for Toulouse Olympique in 2017

He spent four seasons with Toulouse, earning international honours while at the club in 2018.

=== London Broncos ===
He joined the London Broncos ahead of the 2020 RFL Championship season on a two-year contract.

=== International ===
Curran gained international honours for France in 2018. He qualified under residency grounds, having lived in France for over three years. He earned three caps against Wales, Ireland and Scotland, scoring a try on debut against the Welsh.

== Club statistics ==
Year	Club	Competition	Appearances	Tries	Goals	Drop goals	Points
2012-13	Villeneuve	Elite One Championship	10	1	0	0	4
2013-14	Villeneuve	Elite One Championship	11	4	0	0	16
2014-15	Villeneuve	Elite One Championship	16	4	0	0	16
2016	Toulouse Olympique	League 1	19	10	0	0	40
2017	Toulouse Olympique	Championship	29	19	0	0	76
2018	Toulouse Olympique	Championship	23	14	0	0	56
2019	Toulouse Olympique	Championship	18	4	0	0	16
2020	London Broncos	Championship	6	3	0	0	12
2021	London Broncos	Championship	9	4	0	0	16
Club career total			141	63	0	0	252
