= Gregory White =

Australian rugby footballer

Greg White
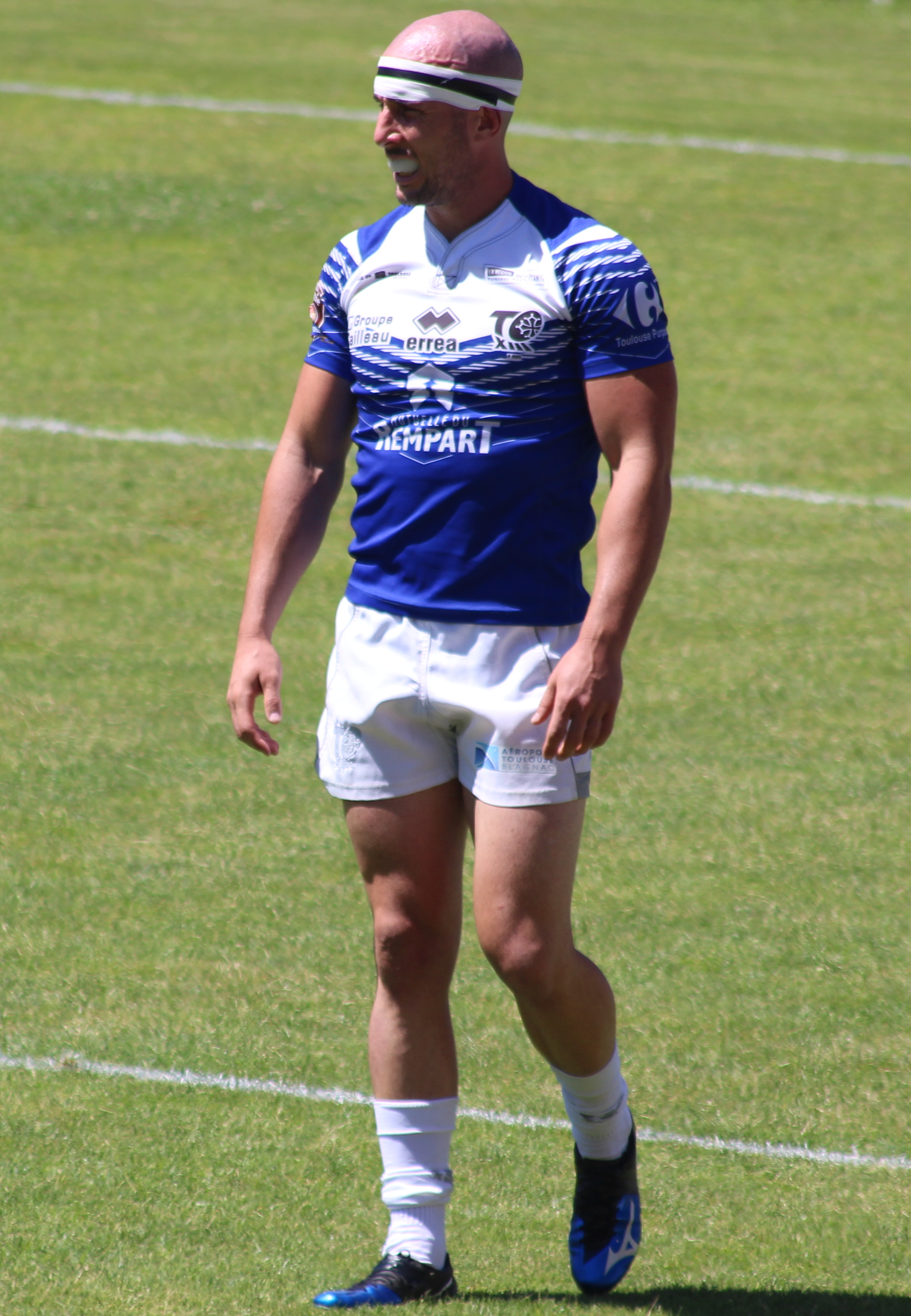

Personal information
- Full name: Gregory White
- Born: 28 August 1988 (age 38) Manly, Sydney, New South Wales, Australia
- Height: 6 ft 0.5 in (1.84 m)
- Weight: 13 st 4 lb (84 kg)

Playing information

Rugby union
- Position: Fullback, Wing, Outside centre
Club
Years	Team	Pld	T	G	FG	P
2007	Manly RUFC
2010	Warringah
2012	Melrose RFC
	Total	0	0	0	0	0

Rugby league
- Position: Centre
Club
Years	Team	Pld	T	G	FG	P
2011–12	Toulouse Olympique	26	15	0	0	60
2016–17	Toulouse Olympique	30	16	0	0	64
	Total	56	31	0	0	124
- Source: As of 12 October 2017

Gregory White (born 28 August 1988 in Sydney, New South Wales, Australia) is a dual rugby union and rugby league utility with French, English and Australian nationalities. He was named in the French Rugby League squad to play England, Wales, Scotland and Ireland in October 2011.

He played with Melrose RFC RBS Scottish Premiers from August to October 2012 . Melrose are also participants in the British and Irish Cup.

In November 2012, he was invited to join the England 7's squad for training in London, to prepare for the IRB 7's series circuit in Dubai. He will also train with the squad in Dubai as part of an RFU invitational team.

Previously he was with Toulouse Olympique XIII in SW France. Toulouse Olympique play in the Co-operative Championship, the second-tier competition below the Super League Europe. He re signed again in September for Toulouse Olympique to play in France's Elite 1 competition commencing October 2011 through May 2012.

In his first rugby league game in 2 years (expecting to return to his Warringah Rats Rugby Union club within the month.), he had his debut as a medical replacement for an injured player, in a friendly against Super League side Catalans Dragons. This was quickly followed by an impressive gathering of form with consecutive game tries against the soon to be announced 2012 Super League side Widnes Vikings and Keighley Cougars in the Northern Rail Cup. He was quickly recognised for his performances and signed up for a permanent team place and earmarked for the French National Team. His form continued to grow to become one of the leading try scorers in the competition.

Bobby Goulding French National Coach 2011 Squad said: "New player Gregory White has appeared in the group of 30 French player squad for 2011. I sincerely believe that this player can belong in Super League if the opportunity is given. He can play both a 'wing and at the back and represents a real danger to the opponent. [ in attack ]"

"Gregory White has good qualities of support and is a good finisher" ** Campagne Automnale Des Bleus

He holds Australian, English and French nationality, enabling him to play in all three countries outside of national quota restrictions in dual rugby codes of union and league.

White has previously played in the Sydney Shute Shield Premiership which is Australia's top Rugby Union club competition under Super 15, for the Warringah Rugby Club in 2010, and Manly RUFC since 2007. In 2009 he played as an invitation player in the Dubai 7's to assist India's development for the Commonwealth Games, with games against France B. In rugby union he plays fullback, wing and outside centre. In rugby league, he plays fullback or wing.

He went to school at St Augustines, Brookvale NSW Australia and Epsom College UK and university at ACPE, the Australian College of Physical Education, Sydney.
