= Kalausa Leha =

Tongan rugby footballer (born 1994)

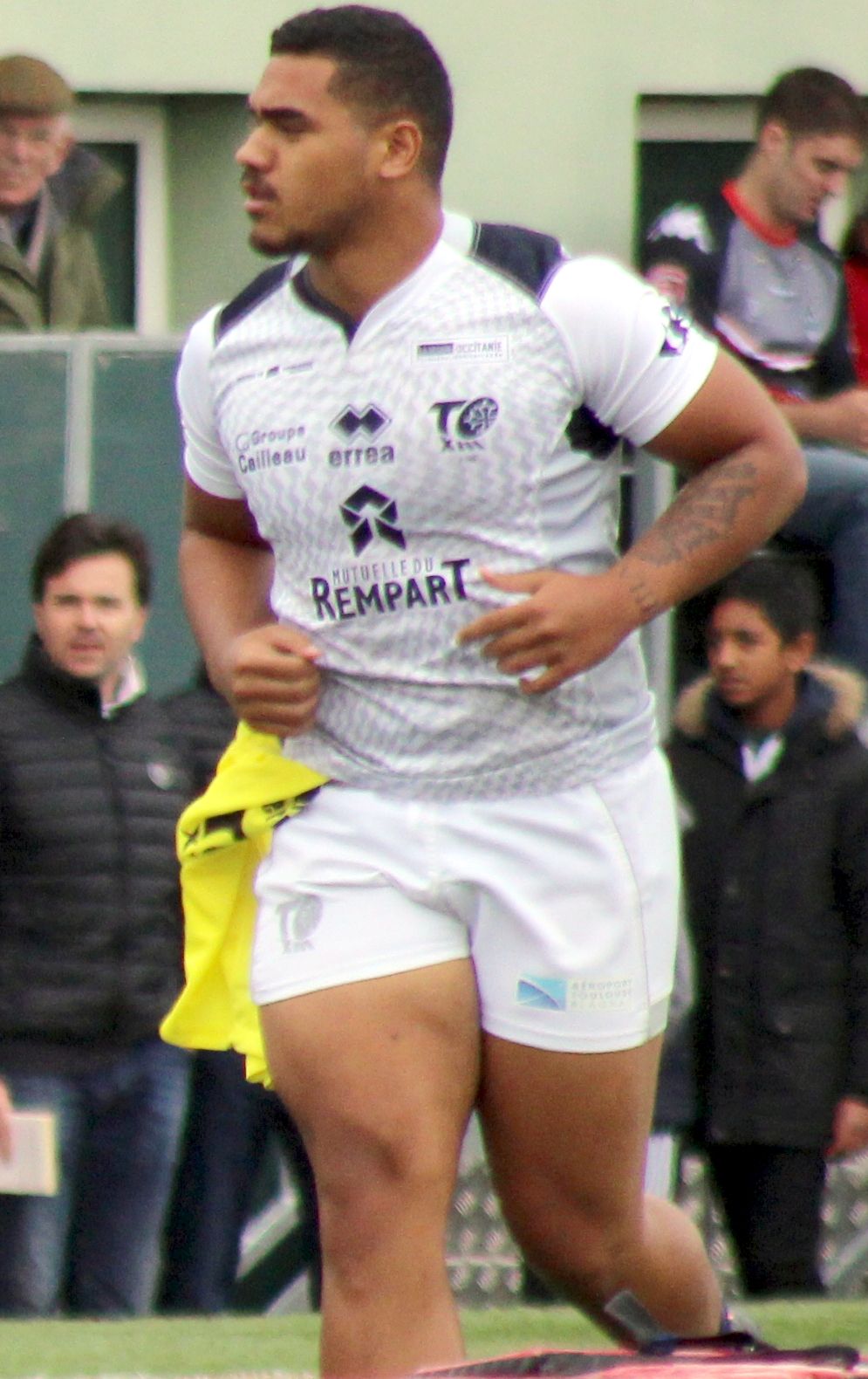

Personal information
- Full name: Kalausa Junior Leha
- Born: 26 March 1994 (age 31) Auckland, New Zealand
- Height: 6 ft 1 in (1.85 m)
- Weight: 17 st 0 lb (108 kg)

Playing information

Rugby union
Club
Years	Team	Pld	T	G	FG	P
2015–16	Aurillac

Rugby league
- Position: Prop, Second-row, Loose forward
Club
Years	Team	Pld	T	G	FG	P
2016–	Toulouse Olympique	28	3	1	0	4
- Source: As of 16 April 2017

Kalausa Jnr Leha is a Tongan rugby footballer who currently plays rugby league for Toulouse Olympique in the Kingstone Press Championship. He plays as a prop, second-row and can also play as a loose-forward.

Leha has previously played for the Parramatta Eels and Cronulla Sharks Holden Cup U20s Competition and also for Aurillac in the Rugby Pro D2.

From the age of 12 to 19 he was in the junior system of the Parramatta Eels.
