= Steel City Stadium =

Sports venue in Sheffield, England

- New Don Valley Stadium
- Interactive map of Steel City Stadium
- Full name: Steel City Stadium
- Former names: Sheffield Olympic Legacy Park Community Stadium (2022-2024)
- Location: Attercliffe Road, Sheffield, South Yorkshire, England
- Coordinates: 53.3960°N 1.4259°W
- Owner: Sheffield City Council; Sheffield Hallam University; Legacy Park Ltd
- Operator: Scarborough Group International
- Capacity: 1,998
- Surface: 3G synthetic pitch
- Field size: 149 x 85 yards (pitch)
- Public transit: Y TT; Arena / Olympic Legacy Park

Construction
- Built: 2021–2022
- Opened: 2022
- Cost: £10 million

Tenants
- Sheffield Eagles (2018–present); Sheffield Giants (2021–present); Sheffield United W.F.C. (2018–2019)

Steel City Stadium is a stadium built at the Sheffield Olympic Legacy Park. It occupies part of the site of the former Don Valley Stadium.

The first stage of the Stadium development was completed in January 2022, and features a three-storey, covered stand having capacity for up to 782 seated spectators and overall 2000, alongside 23,000 sq ft of business space and ancillary facilities. It was known as the Sheffield Olympic Legacy Park Community Stadium until 2025 when it was renamed Steel City Stadium.

It is the home ground of Sheffield Eagles, who play in the Betfred Championship - tier two of the English Rugby League.

== History ==
On 11 January 2013, Sheffield City Council announced that the Don Valley stadium was to be closed and demolished as part of a £50 million budget-cutting measure. An eleventh hour meeting was held at Sheffield Town Hall on 1 March 2013. Local and national politicians met to discuss the proposed closure and any possibility of preventing it. A final decision was made that the stadium was to close in September 2013 and would be demolished from 21 November 2013.

In October 2014, it was announced that the Olympic Legacy Park would be constructed on the site of the old Don Valley Stadium. It was to contain an Advanced Wellbeing Research Centre, an indoor sports arena, a sports pitch and stadium to be home of the Sheffield Eagles, Oasis Academy and University Technical College (UTC). The college, which cost £10 million and is backed by Sheffield College and Sheffield Hallam University, opened in 2016.

On 11 March 2018, the Sheffield Eagles finally made a long-awaited return to Sheffield, after spells playing in Doncaster, Rotherham and Wakefield. The first competitive sporting event played at the OLP ended in a 10-44 loss to the Toronto Wolfpack. This was after the scheduled first game against the London Broncos was postponed due to bad weather conditions.

They were joined later in the year by Sheffield United W.F.C. who played their first game at the stadium on 4 December 2018. Although they changed their plans and moved to Chesterfield FC's Technique Stadium in 2019 and now play at the club's main stadium, Bramall Lane.

In 2021 American Football team Sheffield Giants also began playing their home games at the stadium.

Construction works started on the Community Stadium in February 2021 and were completed in February 2022.
