= Olympic Legacy Park =

Place in Sheffield, South Yorkshire, England

Coordinates: 53.396253°N 1.425232°W

Sheffield Olympic Legacy Park
- Interactive map of Sheffield Olympic Legacy Park
- Address: Don Valley; Sheffield; South Yorkshire; England
- Public transit: Y TT; Arena / Olympic Legacy Park

Tenants
- Sheffield Eagles (rugby league) (2018–); Sheffield Sharks (basketball) (2023–); Sheffield Hatters (basketball) (2023–)

Website
- olympiclegacypark.co.uk

The Olympic Legacy Park is a sports and recreation hub in Sheffield, South Yorkshire, specialising in health and wellbeing, collaborative research and education.

== About ==
Legacy Park Ltd. is a joint venture between Sheffield Hallam University, Sheffield Teaching Hospitals NHS Foundation Trust and Sheffield City Council, created to deliver the Sheffield Olympic Legacy Park.

On the 35-acre Sheffield Olympic Legacy Park is the English Institute of Sport Sheffield (EISS), iceSheffield, Altitude, Don Valley Bowl, Sheffield Hallam University's Advanced Wellbeing Research Centre (AWRC), Oasis Academy Don Valley, UTC Sheffield Olympic Legacy Park campus, 3G pitch, Canon Medical Arena, Stadium, Hotel and park environment including 100m sprint track, Outdoor City Run Route cycle paths and green open spaces.

Since 2018, Sheffield Olympic Legacy Park has served as the home ground for the Sheffield Eagles Rugby League club.

In August 2020 the Don Valley Bowl hosted a drive-in cinema.

== Facilities ==
=== Advanced Wellbeing Research Centre ===
Sheffield Hallam University's Advanced Wellbeing Research Centre (AWRC).

=== UTC Sheffield Olympic Legacy Park campus ===
University Technical College (UTC) Sheffield Olympic Legacy Park, part of the UTC Sheffield Academy Trust, is a college for 13- to 19-year-olds, specialising in Health Sciences, Sport Science and Computing. Students can start in Y9, Y10 or Y12 to study a combination of GCSEs/A Levels and a technical specialism (OCR Cambridge Technicals and Nationals).

=== Tram stop ===
The Olympic Legacy Park is served by Arena / Olympic Legacy Park tram stop, which opened on the Yellow route of the Supertram network in 1994. Tram-train services to Rotherham Parkgate commenced in 2018.
