= Stade Ernest-Argelès =

French rugby stadium

Coordinates: 43°38′13″N 1°24′6″E

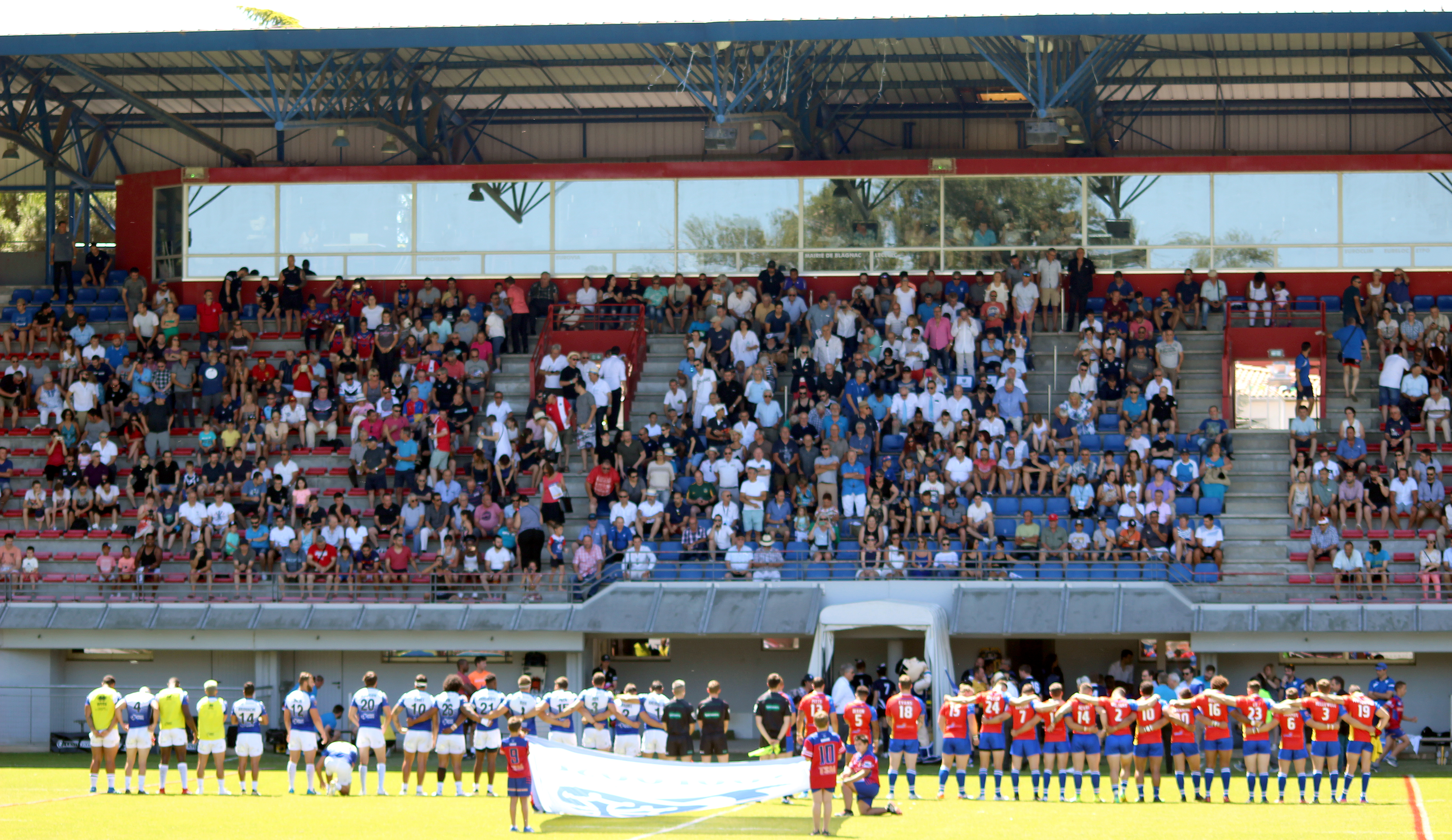
- Interactive map of Stade Ernest-Argelès
- Location: Blagnac, Toulouse, [France
- Capacity: 4000 (seated capacity)
- Surface: Grass

Tenant
- Toulouse Olympique (2016–present)

Ernest-Argelès stadium is a French Rugby football stadium with a capacity of 4,000 seats located in Blagnac (in the close vicinity of Toulouse).

== Description ==
Ernest-Argelès stadium is located on the sports complex of Ramier. It has the particularity of being close to the Garonne River on the opposite bank from the Ernest-Wallon Stadium of the Stade Toulousain.

Rugby Union clubs Blagnac SCR, in the third division, and Blagnac Saint-Orens RF, in the women's Premier division, play there their home games.

Toulouse Olympique played Rugby League in the Championship between 2016 and 2019 as the Stade des Minimes was not available. In 2020 they came to an agreement with Stade Toulousain to play their matches at Stade Ernest Wallon until 2029.
