= Craven Park, Barrow-in-Furness =

Sports venue in Barrow-in-Furness, Cumbria, England

Craven Park
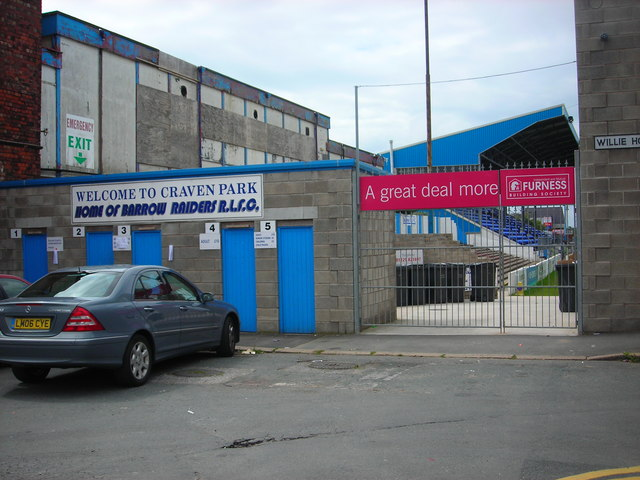
- Interactive map of Craven Park
- Location: Duke Street; Barrow-in-Furness; Cumbria; LA14 5UW
- Coordinates: 54°06′54″N 3°14′7″W
- Capacity: 4000 approx
- Surface: Grass

Construction
- Opened: 1931

Tenant
- Barrow Raiders

Craven Park (also referred to as the Northern Competitions Stadium for sponsorship reasons) is a rugby league stadium in Barrow-in-Furness, Cumbria, England. It is the home of Barrow Raiders rugby league team.

== Rugby league ==
Craven Park was built in 1931, largely as a result of the efforts of supporters of Barrow RLFC, 500 of whom volunteered to construct the ground. The total cost of the building project came to £7,500; which was a substantial sum in those days.

The stadium was named after Commander G. W. Craven, a local war hero, who had started the appeal fund with a donation of £500.

It should not be confused with Craven Park, or Old Craven Park in Hull, other rugby league venues.

Craven Park was a venue for the 2000 Rugby League World Cup.

As of 2022, the capacity of Craven Park stands at 6,000.

Matches of either Barrow or Cumbria against touring international rugby league sides included:

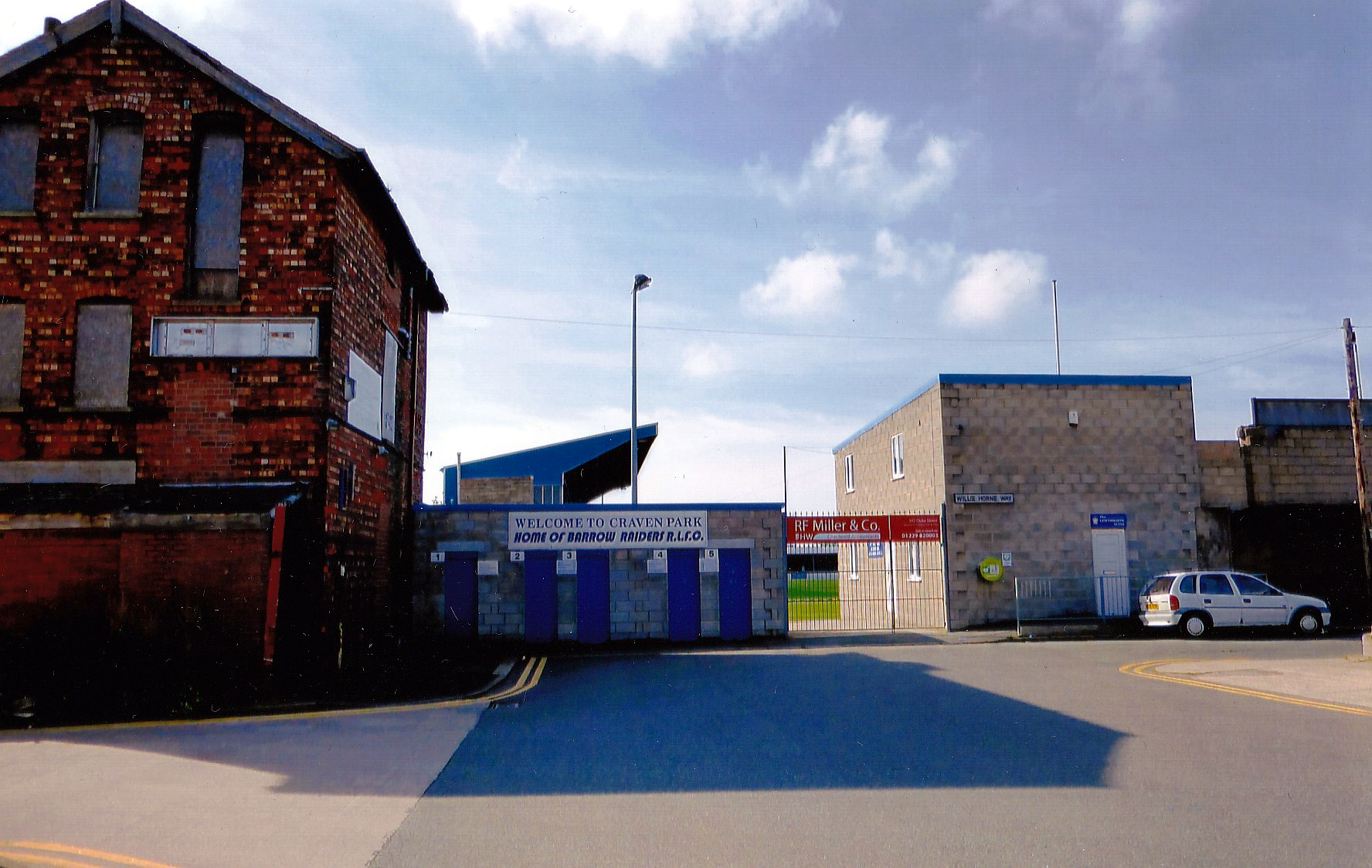
Craven Park

Date	Result	Attendance
16 September 1933	Australia 24–5 Barrow	12,221
4 December 1937	Barrow 12–8 Australia	8,153
23 October 1948	Australia 11–5 Barrow	13,143
11 September 1952	Australia 26–2 Barrow	16,045
18 October 1956	Australia 25–11 Barrow	9,988
24 October 1959	Barrow 12–9 Australia	8,488
2 September 1963	Australia 18–5 Barrow	10,130
16 November 1967	Barrow 10–10 Australia	8,418
1 October 1978	Australia 47–4 Cumbria	5,964
15 October 1982	Australia 29–2 Barrow	6,282
21 October 1986	Australia 48–12 Cumbria	4,233
4 November 2007	Cumbria 70–0 United States	1,028

== Greyhound racing ==
Independent (unaffiliated to a governing body) greyhound racing took place around Craven Park from 1932–1933.
