= Mount Pleasant, Batley =

Rugby stadium in Batley, England

Mount Pleasant
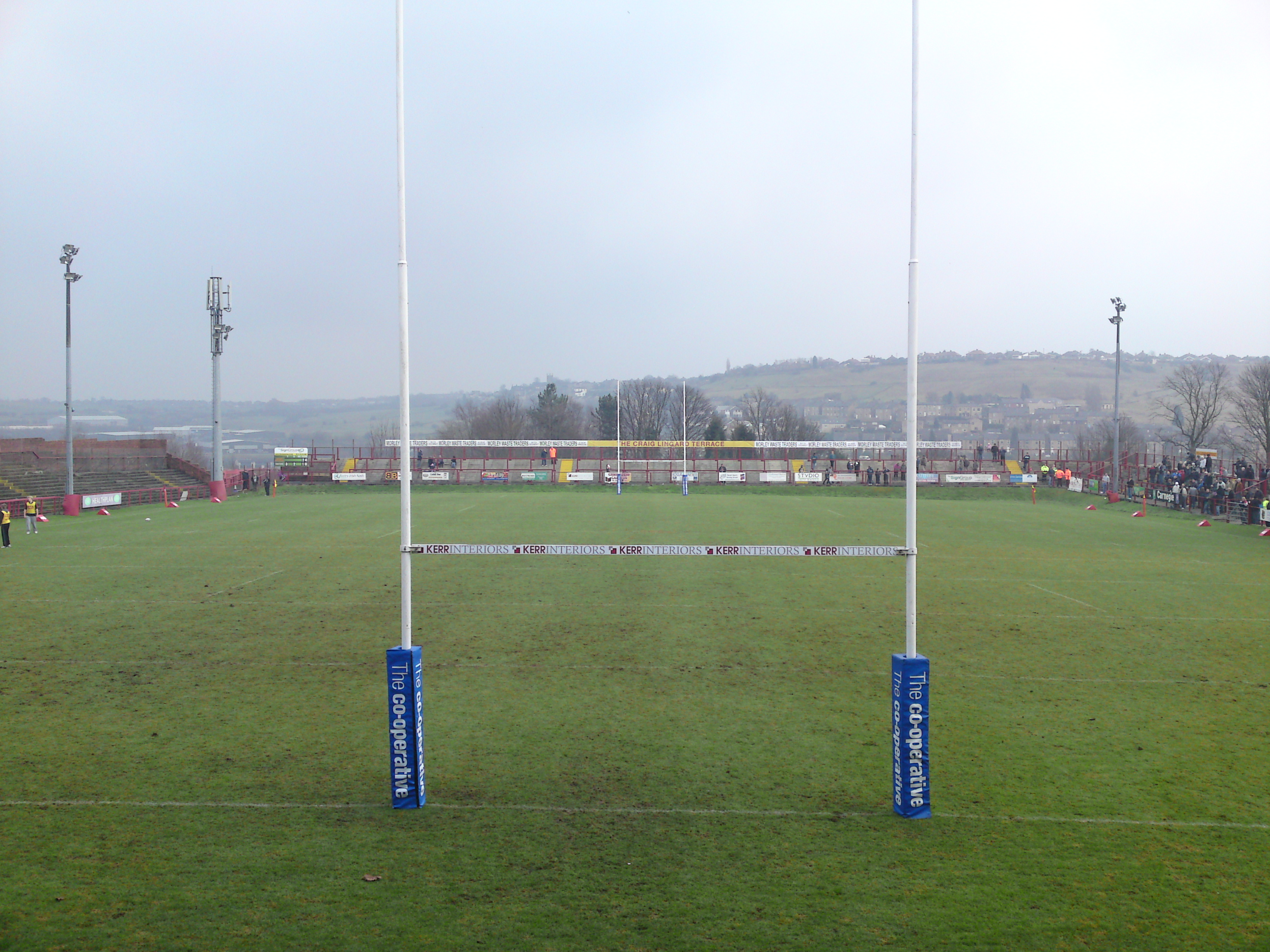
- A view down the hill from behind the rugby posts
- Interactive map of Mount Pleasant
- Location: Batley, West Yorkshire
- Coordinates: 53°42′26″N 1°37′54″W
- Capacity: 7,500
- Surface: Grass
- Scoreboard: Electronic
- Record attendance: 23,989 (Batley vs. Leeds, 14 March 1925)

Construction
- Opened: 1880

Tenants
- Batley Bulldogs (1880–present); Hunslet (1980–1982); Dewsbury Rams (1991); Batley ARLFC (2023-)

Mount Pleasant Stadium, officially known for sponsorship purposes as Fox's Biscuits Stadium, is a rugby league stadium in Batley, West Yorkshire, England. It is the home of the Batley Bulldogs and amateur club Batley ARLFC.

The Mount Pleasant pitch is sloped and is on a hill overlooking Batley. The end of the ground at the top of the hill has three grandstands. Behind the rugby posts is a terraced stand, which houses the players changing rooms and executive boxes.

At the opposite end at the bottom of the hill is an open terraced stand. The bottom corner of the pitch has a pronounced dip.

== History ==
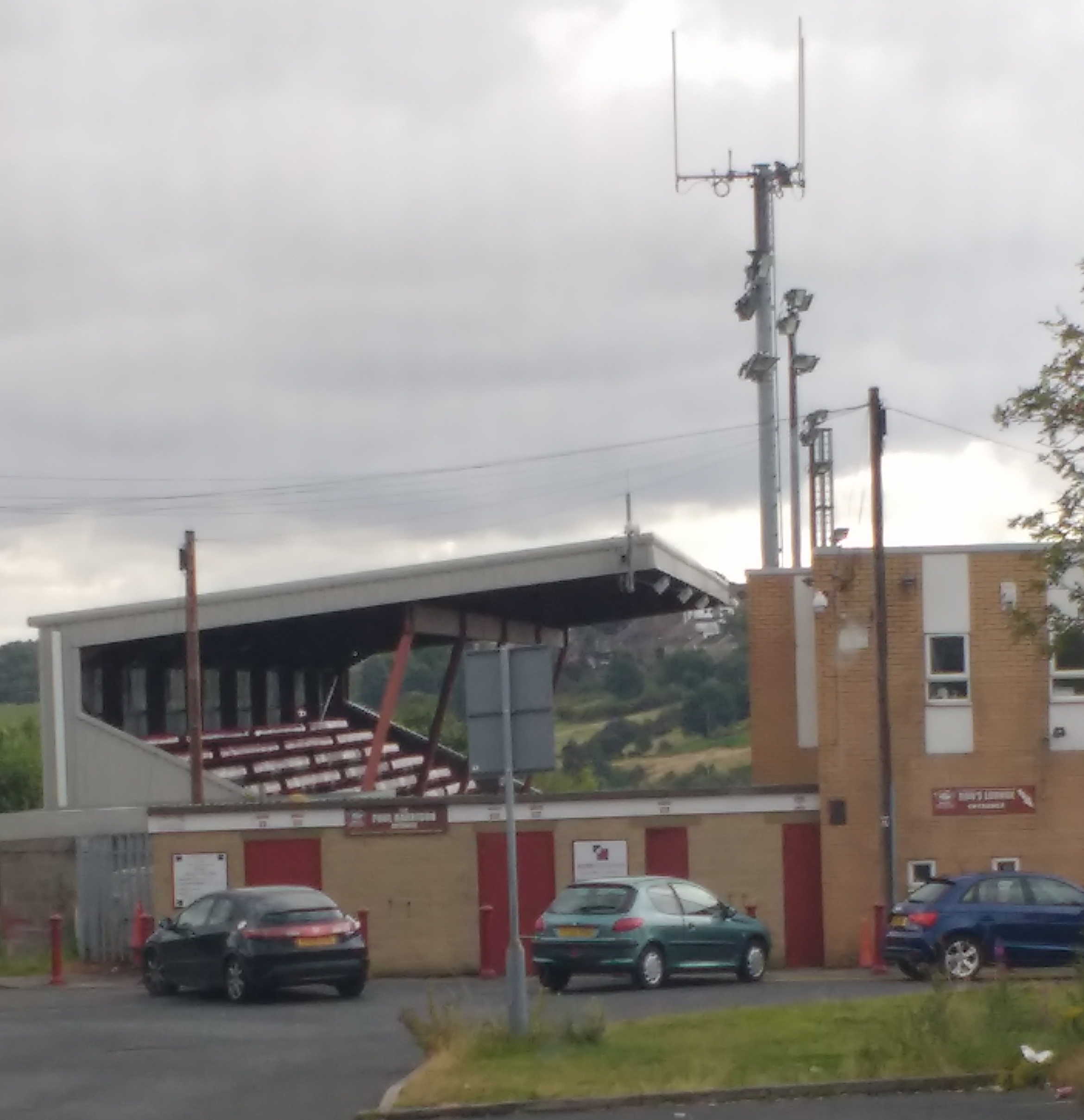
Mount Pleasant in 2016

Batley Cricket Club played at the foot of Howley Hill, more commonly known as "Owd Billy Wood’s Cloise". The cricket club decided to merge with Batley Athletic rugby football club in 1880. The new rugby club played at Mount Pleasant at the top of the hill. The first game on the new ground was on 2 October 1880 when the hosts beat Bradford Zingari. Captain Jacob Parker scored the first try.

In 1886–87, there was just one small covered stand, under which poultry were kept. This was situated where the current main stand is now. The ground was used to host a Yorkshire v Surrey county cricket match at around this time.

The 1893–94 season saw the erection of a huge open grandstand purchased by Batley's football committee following its use at the Great Yorkshire Show held at nearby Dewsbury. It cost £141–10s-0d. Once erected, it covered the whole side of one length of the Mount Pleasant playing area.

In 1901, Mount Pleasant was nearly lost and used for building land until the club's first president, serving from 1880 to 1890. Alderman John W. Blackburn stepped in and bought the land along with Sir Mark Oldroyd, MP. This was then offered back to the club for £2,300. A company was formed to raise the sum, helped greatly by Alderman Joseph Auty, who agreed to donate money on the basis that "no intoxicating liquor was to be sold" at the ground.

The ground's record attendance of 23,989 was set for the visit of Leeds for a third round Challenge Cup match on 14 March 1925.

Local rivals Dewsbury played their home games at Mount Pleasant from 1991 until 1994, while their new stadium was being built.

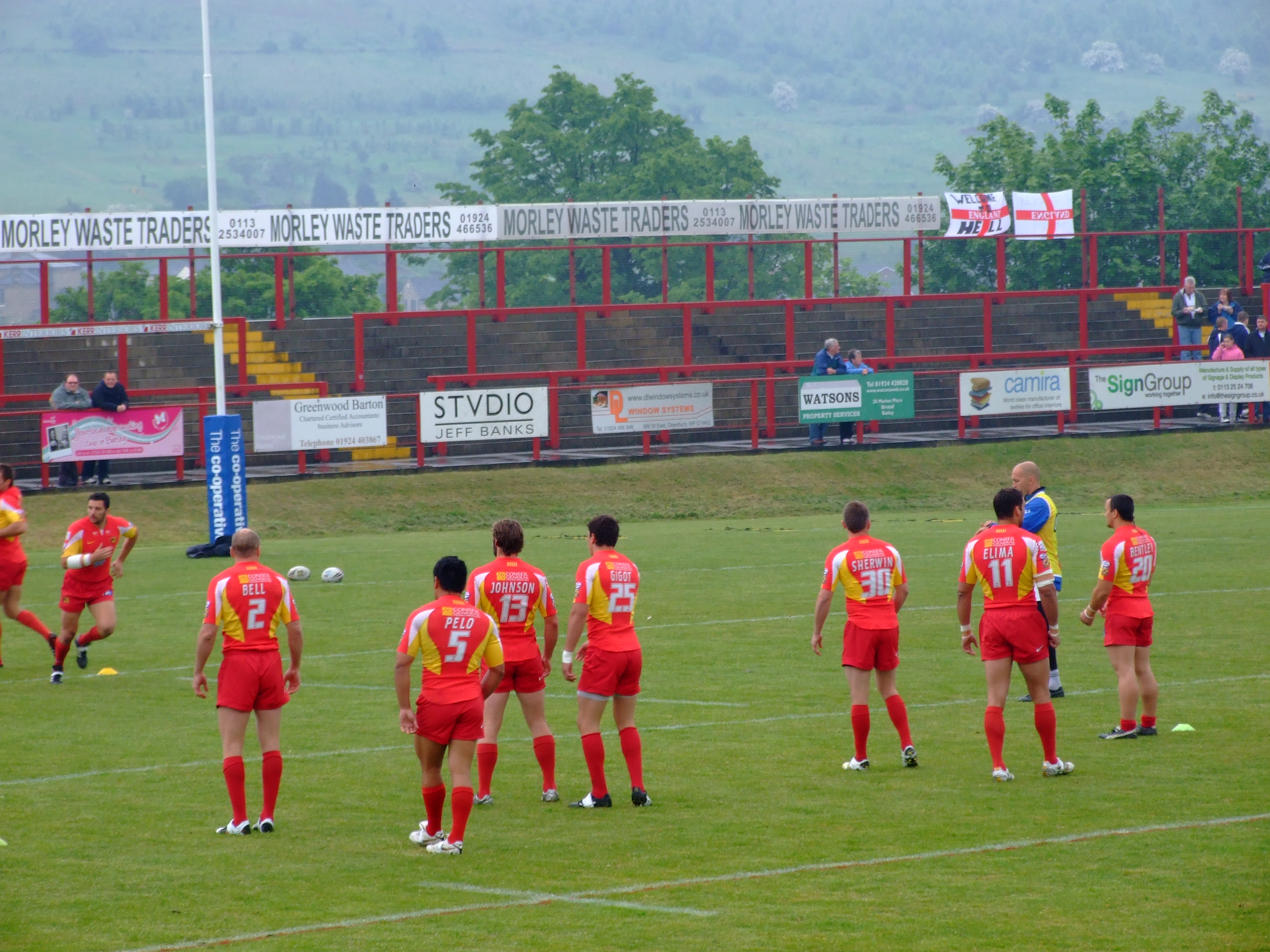
The Catalans Dragons warming up in 2010

On 19 December 2014, Batley announced a two-year sponsorship deal with Fox's Biscuits, including the renaming of Mount Pleasant to Fox's Biscuits Stadium. The naming rights of the stadium were later extended.

At the end of the 2023 season, local amateur club Batley Boys announced they would move into Mount Pleasant and rebrand as Batley ARLFC.

== Sponsors ==
Period	Sponsor	Name
2011–2013	Love Rugby League	Love Rugby League Stadium
2014–	Fox's Biscuits	Fox's Biscuits Stadium

== Bibliography ==
- Delaney, Trevor (1991). The Grounds Of Rugby League. Keighley: Trevor R. Delaney. ISBN 0-9509-9822-2.
