= List of Toronto Wolfpack players =

This is a list of rugby league footballers who have played professionally for the Toronto Wolfpack. Players are listed according to the date of their first professional match in which they played for the club. Appearances and points are for first-team competitive matches only.

These lists encompass player records from the:

- Super League competition, 2020.
- Challenge Cup competition, 2017–2020.
- Championship competition, 2018–2019.
- League 1 competition, 2017.

Key:

- No. — Order of debut. Craig Hall, as the foundation captain, is given No 1.
- App — Total number of games played, both as a starter, and as a substitute
- T — Total number of tries scored
- G — Total number of goals kicked
- FG — Total number of field goals kicked
- Pts — Total number of points scored

== List of players ==
No.	Name	Debut	Career	Previous club	App	T	G	FG	Pts
1	Craig Hall	25 February	2017	Wakefield	25	24	170	0	436
2	Quentin Laulu-Togaga'e	25 February	2017–2018	Sheffield	31	22	0	0	88
3	Jonathan Pownall	25 February	2017–2018	Leigh	32	31	0	0	124
4	Greg Worthington	25 February	2017–2020	Leigh	51	19	0	0	76
5	Ryan Burroughs	25 February	2017	Wentworthville	11	5	0	0	20
6	Blake Wallace	25 February	2017–2020	Illawarra	73	50	41	0	282
7	Rhys Jacks	25 February	2017	Sheffield	22	6	0	0	24
8	Jacob Emmitt	25 February	2017–2019	Swinton	51	2	0	0	8
9	Bob Beswick	25 February	2017–2019	Leigh	64	19	0	0	76
10	Steve Crossley	25 February	2017	Bradford	20	2	0	0	8
11	Andrew Dixon	25 February	2017–2020	Leigh	73	28	0	0	112
12	Richard Whiting	25 February	2017–2018	Leigh	45	18	0	0	72
13	Jack Bussey	25 February	2017–2018	London	36	8	0	0	32
14	James Laithwaite	25 February	2017–2018	Warrington	19	2	0	0	8
15	Fuifui Moimoi	25 February	2017	Leigh	20	12	0	0	48
16	Adam Sidlow	25 February	2017–2020	Bradford	80	16	0	0	64
17	Shaun Pick	25 February	2017	Featherstone	8	1	0	0	4
18	Liam Kay	4 March	2017–2020	Leigh	69	66	0	0	264
19	Gary Wheeler	4 March	2017–2020	Warrington	29	10	0	0	40
20	Toby Everett	12 March	2017	London	3	0	0	0	0
21	Daniel Fleming	17 March	2017	Bradford	15	1	0	0	4
22	Sean Penkywicz	14 April	2017	Leigh	13	6	0	0	24
23	Ryan Bailey	14 April	2017	Warrington	8	1	0	0	4
24	Ryan Brierley	23 April	2017–2019	Huddersfield	40	26	83	2	272
25	Tom Dempsey	3 June	2017	Eastern Suburbs	3	0	0	0	0
26	Joe Eichner	3 June	2017	Jacksonville	1	0	0	0	0
27	Quinn Ngawati	8 July	2017–2018	British Columbia	3	0	0	0	0
28	Josh McCrone	4 February	2018–2020	St. George Illawarra	64	15	1	1	63
29	Adam Higson	4 February	2018–2019	Leigh	18	12	0	0	48
30	Nick Rawsthorne	4 February	2018–2019	Hull F.C.	34	27	0	0	108
31	Sam Hopkins	4 February	2018	Leigh	19	2	0	0	8
32	Cory Paterson	4 February	2018	Leigh	18	11	0	0	44
33	Joe Westerman	4 February	2018	Warrington	6	0	0	0	0
34	Andy Ackers	4 February	2018–2020	London	65	28	0	0	112
35	Jack Buchanan	4 February	2018	Widnes	29	2	0	0	8
36	Olsi Krasniqi	11 February	2018–2019	Salford	20	2	0	0	8
37	Ashton Sims	18 February	2018–2019	Warrington	49	1	0	0	4
38	Jake Butler-Fleming	4 March	2018	York	1	2	0	0	8
39	Reni Maitua	4 March	2018	Leigh	8	2	0	0	8
40	Gareth O'Brien	23 March	2018–2020	Salford	55	31	171	2	468
41	Chase Stanley	30 March	2018–2020	Canterbury-Bankstown	36	21	0	0	84
42	Darcy Lussick	28 April	2018–2020	Manly-Warringah	43	5	0	0	20
43	Matty Russell	19 May	2018–2020	Warrington	39	34	0	0	136
44	Mason Caton-Brown	18 August	2018	Wakefield	7	2	0	0	8
45	Ricky Leutele	3 February	2019–2020	Cronulla-Sutherland	34	20	0	0	80
46	Joe Mellor	3 February	2019–2020	Widnes	22	8	0	0	32
47	Bodene Thompson	3 February	2019–2020	Warrington	26	5	0	0	20
48	Jon Wilkin	3 February	2019–2020	St Helens	33	3	0	0	12
49	Tom Olbison	3 February	2019–2020	Widnes	35	3	0	0	12
50	Gadwin Springer	3 February	2019–2020	Castleford	23	0	0	0	0
51	Anthony Mullally	24 February	2019–2020	Leeds	31	4	0	0	16
52	Jack Logan	9 March	2019	Hull F.C.	3	1	0	0	4
53	Brad Fash	17 March	2019	Hull F.C.	2	0	0	0	0
54	Hakim Miloudi	6 April	2019–2020	Hull F.C.	16	3	3	1	19
55	Brad Singleton	2 February	2020	Leeds	4	1	0	0	4
56	James Cunningham	2 February	2020	London	3	0	0	0	0
57	Sonny Bill Williams	2 February	2020	Blues (RU)	5	0	0	0	0
58	Tony Gigot	21 February	2020	Catalans	4	0	0	0	0
59	Jack Wells	29 February	2020	Wigan	2	1	0	0	4

== Internationals ==
=== Canada ===
Player	Years	Notes
Quinn Ngawati	2017	Americas Championship

=== Ireland ===
Player	Years	Notes
Liam Kay	2017	World Cup
Bob Beswick	2019	World Cup qualifying

=== Scotland ===
Player	Years	Notes
Ryan Brierley	2018–2019	European Championship and World Cup qualifying

=== United States ===
Player	Years	Notes
Ryan Burroughs	2017	World Cup
Joe Eichner	2017	World Cup

=== Wales ===
Player	Years	Notes
Jacob Emmitt	2018	European Championship
