= 2017 Toronto Wolfpack season =

- League 1 Rank: 1st (Promoted)
- Challenge Cup: 5th Round
- 2017 record: Wins: 22; draws: 1; losses: 2
- Points scored: For: 1,230; against: 304

Team information
- CEO: (Canada) Eric Perez
- Head Coach: (England) Paul Rowley
- Captain: (England) Craig Hall
- Stadium: Lamport Stadium
- Avg. attendance: 6,992
- Agg. attendance: 76,909
- High attendance: 8,546 (vs Doncaster)

Top scorers
- Tries: (Republic of Ireland) Liam Kay (27)
- Goals: (England) Craig Hall (170)
- Points: (England) Craig Hall (436)
List of seasons	2018 →

The 2017 Toronto Wolfpack season was the inaugural season for the Toronto Wolfpack rugby league football club. The Wolfpack finished 1st in League 1, winning 20 of their 22 matches, and earned promotion to 2018 Rugby League Championship.

== Season review ==
=== April 2016 ===
After becoming the first North American team to join the Rugby Football League (RFL) it was announced that former Leigh Centurions coach Paul Rowley would be taking the head coach's role for the Canadian team. Shortly after Brian Noble joined the club as the director of rugby. Coach Rowley announced that his assistant manager would be ex Super League and Ireland international Simon Finnigan. The Wolfpack announced that they would be playing their home games at the 9,600 capacity Lamport Stadium.

=== July 2016 ===
Toronto announced their first two signings, experienced Wakefield Trinity Wildcats centre Craig Hall and try scoring winger Liam Kay from Leigh Centurions. The Wolfpack later announced that they had signed Warrington Wolves pair, back rower James Laithwaite and halfback Gary Wheeler, in a bid to recruit a competitive squad for the 2017 season.

=== August 2016 ===
In August, Toronto announced it had signed its first Canadian player, (and Canada's captain) Sheffield Eagles halfback Rhys Jacks. Following this, young Australian halfback Blake Wallace signed for Toronto from the Illawarra Cutters. Further recruitment in the forwards was made as Wales prop Dan Fleming signed with the Wolfpack. 19-year-old halfback Reece Dean also joined the Toronto ranks from Challenge Cup winners Hull FC, identified as a player for the future by coach Rowley. The Wolfpack also announced that Leigh Centurions duo, loose forward Andrew Dixon and winger Jonathan Pownall, were to join for the 2017 season.

=== September 2016 ===
The first signing of September was loose forward Jack Bussey who was signed from RFL Championship side London Broncos. Toronto bolstered their team further by bringing in experienced Ireland international hooker Bob Beswick from Super League side Leigh Centurions. Beswick will take up the role of head of strength and conditioning at Toronto along with his playing duties. Greg Worthington was the next to join Paul Rowley's roster with the powerful centre being sign from the coach's former club Leigh.

=== October 2016 ===
Toronto announced their first American player, United States national representative Ryan Burroughs from the Wentworthville Magpies in the Ron Massey Cup. Bradford Bulls player Kurt Haggerty retired from playing rugby league in order to become part of Paul Rowley's coaching staff at Toronto. In the middle of the month the 2017 fixtures were released and it was revealed that Toronto's first ever League match would be away to London Skolars in March 2017. Their first home game would be in Round 6 against Oxford Rugby League in May 2017. Following the fixture release, Toronto announced that they had signed young prop forward Toby Everett from the London Broncos on a season-long loan.

=== November 2016 ===
The Wolfpack announced that they had signed former England international and veteran centre Richard Whiting from Super League side Leigh Centurions. In addition to this, young prop forward Steve Crossley signed for the Wolfpack from RFL Championship shield winners Bradford Bulls. Experienced Championship fullback Quentin Laulu-Togaga'e was signed from Sheffield Eagles. Toronto announced the signing of American born prop forward Jerome Veve from the Gold Coast Titans, in addition to this prop Jacob Emmitt signed for the Wolfpack from Swinton Lions. At the 2016 Four Nations final, the Wolfpack held a press conference where it was announced that Tongan prop Fuifui Moimoi had signed a one-year deal with the club from Leigh Centurions. In addition to this it was revealed that Premier Sports had acquired the rights to all of Toronto's matches for the 2017 and 2018 seasons. Furthermore, current Super League champions Wigan Warriors and Challenge Cup winners Hull F.C. will play Toronto in the pre-season friendlies.

=== December 2016 ===
During this month, the final 18 trialists from Toronto's Last Tackle campaign traveled to the UK to compete in a friendly match against Brighouse Rangers (Toronto's training partners) in order to win a full-time contract with the Wolfpack. With a record crowd of over 500 at Brighouse, the Wolfpack were victorious 28–26 due to a try in the last 5 minutes from Nathan Campbell. After the match it was announced that Jamaican born Campbell would join the first team squad for the 2017 season, in addition to this Canadian born Quinn Ngawati, the 17 year old stand off, was also offered a contract thanks to a try and 4 goals in the match. The final player to receive a full-time contract was USA born Joe Eichner, a second row forward who had previously played for Jacksonville Axemen.

=== January 2017 ===
Due to the liquidation of the Bradford Bulls, prop Adam Sidlow announced that he had signed with Toronto. Trialist Chad Bain (a Canadian born prop) was called up to the first team by Brian Noble following a man of the match performance in the friendly against Brighouse. During the month, Toronto played their first ever pre-season friendly against reigning Challenge Cup champions Hull FC. The Wolfpack took an early lead through halfback Blake Wallace but Hull soon took the lead and won the match 26–20 with further Toronto tries coming from Fuifui Moimoi, Jonathan Pownall and Liam Kay with captain Craig Hall kicking two conversions.

=== February 2017 ===
It was announced that Toronto would enter the 2017 Challenge Cup in the 3rd round along with the other League 1 sides. The Wolfpack were drawn away to National Conference League premier side Siddal. They overcame the amateur team 14–6 in tough conditions with American Ryan Burroughs crossing for the first competitive try for the Wolfpack.

=== March 2017 ===
Toronto started the League 1 season with a comprehensive 76–0 victory over London Skolars. Prop Fuifui Moimoi was the highlight of the match as he crossed for a hat-trick, the first player to achieve that at Toronto. In the process they helped to achieve the record attendance for the Skolars with 1,542 people coming to see the Wolfpack's first ever league game. Following this the Wolfpack travelled to Cumbria to face Whitehaven. Toronto came away with a 24–10 victory on a muddy and wet surface, captain Craig Hall scored the opening try with Liam Kay, Bob Beswick and Jonny Pownall also crossing for tries. Toronto continued their good start to their first Challenge Cup campaign as they beat RFL Championship side London Broncos in a close fought 30–26 win. The Wolfpack rounded up the month with a 48–21 win at the Keighley Cougars, the match was very close with Keighley 9–8 up at half time however the superior fitness of Toronto and a Jonny Pownall hat-trick saw them win the game.

=== April 2017 ===
Toronto announced the signing of former Leeds Rhinos and retired prop forward Ryan Bailey on a season long contract, meanwhile hooker Sean Penkywicz came back from a ban and signed for the club. The Wolfpack continued their winning run in the league with a comprehensive 82–6 victory over Doncaster, loose forward Jack Bussey scored a hat-trick while Fuifui Moimoi marked his return with a brace of tries along with winger Liam Kay and halfback Blake Wallace also scoring two tries each. Captain Craig Hall kicked a record 13 goals in the match. The following week saw Toronto beat North Wales Crusaders 80–0 in a one sided game, the Wolfpack were 60–0 at halftime with Hall scoring a hat-trick of tries and becoming the first player for the Wolfpack to reach 100 points for the club. The club announced the signing of halfback Ryan Brierley from the Huddersfield Giants, Brierley previously played under coach Paul Rowley at Leigh Centurions. April ended with Toronto's first ever loss in a competitive match as they were narrowly defeated 22–29 by Super League side Salford Red Devils in the Challenge Cup.

=== May 2017 ===
Team flew back to Toronto for the first ever home game for Toronto at Lamport Stadium on May 6 against Oxford RL. After the game, they immediately flew back to England to prepare for the game on May 12 against Newcastle Thunder. Just after that game, the Wolfpack flew transatlantic again back to Toronto for 2 home games.

== Competitions ==
Win Draw Loss

=== Pre-season friendlies ===
Date	Home	Score	Away	Venue	Tries	Goals	Attendance
22 January 2017	Hull FC	26-20	Toronto Wolfpack	KC Stadium	Wallace, Moimoi, Pownall, Kay	Hall 2/4	3,758

=== League 1 ===
==== Table ====
Pos	Team	Pld	W	D	L	PF	PA	PD	Pts	Qualification
1	Toronto Wolfpack	15	15	0	0	916	157	+759	30	League 1 Super 8s
2	Whitehaven	15	13	1	1	469	236	+233	27	League 1 Super 8s
3	Barrow Raiders	15	12	1	2	576	264	+312	25	League 1 Super 8s
4	York City Knights	15	10	0	5	487	305	+182	20	League 1 Super 8s
5	Doncaster	15	9	2	4	449	327	+122	20	League 1 Super 8s
6	Newcastle Thunder	15	9	0	6	459	328	+131	18	League 1 Super 8s
7	Keighley Cougars	15	7	1	7	590	387	+203	15	League 1 Super 8s
8	Workington Town	15	7	1	7	436	370	+66	15	League 1 Super 8s
9	North Wales Crusaders	15	7	1	7	366	422	−56	15	League 1 Shield
10	Hunslet	15	7	0	8	418	377	+41	14	League 1 Shield
11	London Skolars	15	6	1	8	367	453	−86	13	League 1 Shield
12	Gloucestershire All Golds	15	6	0	9	310	530	−220	12	League 1 Shield
13	Oxford	15	4	0	11	275	629	−354	8	League 1 Shield
14	Coventry Bears	15	2	0	13	287	615	−328	4	League 1 Shield
15	South Wales Ironmen	15	1	0	14	212	654	−442	2	League 1 Shield
16	Hemel Stags	15	1	0	14	229	792	−563	2	League 1 Shield

==== Results ====
Date	Rnd	Home	Score	Away	Venue	Tries	Goals	Attendance
4 March 2017	1	London Skolars	0-76	Toronto Wolfpack	New River Stadium	Moimoi (3), Kay (2), Pownall (2), Worthington (2), Beswick, Dixon, Hall, Togaga'e	Hall 12/13	1,542
12 March 2017	2	Whitehaven	10-24	Toronto Wolfpack	Recreation Ground	Beswick, Hall, Kay, Pownall	Hall 4/5	643
26 March 2017	3	Keighley Cougars	21-48	Toronto Wolfpack	Cougar Park	Pownall (3), Sidlow (2), Dixon, Hall, Kay, Wallace	Hall 6/9	1,128
9 April 2017	4	Doncaster	6-82	Toronto Wolfpack	Keepmoat Stadium	Bussey (3), Kay (2), Moimoi (2), Wallace (2), Beswick, Jacks, Togaga'e, Whiting, Worthington	Hall 13/14	943
14 April 2017	5	North Wales Crusaders	0-80	Toronto Wolfpack	Racecourse Ground	Hall (3), Togaga'e (2), Wheeler (2), Jacks, Kay, Moimoi, Penkywicz, Sidlow, Wallace, Worthington	Hall 12/14	590
6 May 2017	6	Toronto Wolfpack	62-12	Oxford	Lamport Stadium	Brierley (2), Dixon (2), Pownall (2), Whiting (2), Burroughs, Hall, Wallace, Worthington	Hall 7/12	6,281
12 May 2017	7	Newcastle Thunder	22-40	Toronto Wolfpack	Kingston Park	Brierley (2), Beswick, Kay, Pownall, Togaga'e, Wallace	Hall 6/7	1,087
20 May 2017	8	Toronto Wolfpack	70-2	Barrow Raiders	Lamport Stadium	Togaga'e (3), Brierley (2), Bailey, Dixon, Penkywicz, Pick, Wallace, Wheeler, Worthington	Hall 11/12	7,144
3 June 2017	9	Toronto Wolfpack	54-12	Coventry Bears	Lamport Stadium	Kay (3), Dixon (2), Moimoi (2), Beswick, Brierley, Jacks	Hall 7/10	7,236
11 June 2017	10	South Wales Ironmen	0-66	Toronto Wolfpack	The Wern	Worthington (3), Burroughs (2), Hall (2), Whiting (2), Brierley, Bussey, Penkywicz, Pownall	Hall 7/13	697
18 June 2017	11	Workington Town	12-58	Toronto Wolfpack	Derwent Park	Brierley (2), Hall (2), Pownall (2), Worthington (2), Bussey, Penkywicz	Hall 9/10	835
24 June 2017	12	Toronto Wolfpack	56-12	Hunslet	Lamport Stadium	Togaga'e (3), Pownall (2), Brierley, Hall, Kay, Laithwaite, Penkywicz, Whiting	Hall 6/11	6,042
1 July 2017	13	Toronto Wolfpack	64-22	York City Knights	Lamport Stadium	Kay (5), Pownall (2), Beswick, Bussey, Hall, Penkywicz, Togaga'e	Hall 8/12	5,646
8 July 2017	14	Toronto Wolfpack	62-10	Gloucestershire All Golds	Lamport Stadium	Hall (2), Beswick, Burroughs, Crossley, Jacks, Moimoi, Pownall, Togaga'e, Whiting, Worthington	Hall 9/11	7,139
15 July 2017	15	Toronto Wolfpack	74-16	Hemel Stags	Lamport Stadium	Hall (4), Wallace (3), Beswick, Crossley, Fleming, Kay, Moimoi, Pownall	Hall 11/13	7,247

==== Super 8's ====
Pos	Team	Pld	W	D	L	PF	PA	PD	Pts	Promotion or qualification
1	Toronto Wolfpack	22	20	1	1	1164	243	+921	41	Promoted as Champions
2	Barrow Raiders	22	18	1	3	731	381	+350	37	Play-off semi-finals
3	Whitehaven	22	17	1	4	656	349	+307	35	Play-off semi-finals
4	York City Knights	22	12	1	9	641	460	+181	25	Play-off semi-finals
5	Newcastle Thunder	22	12	0	10	595	521	+74	24	Play-off semi-finals
6	Doncaster	22	10	3	9	593	492	+101	23	Eliminated
7	Keighley Cougars	22	10	2	10	728	565	+163	22	Eliminated
8	Workington Town	22	9	1	12	532	621	−89	19	Eliminated

Date	Rnd	Home	Score	Away	Venue	Tries	Goals	Attendance
30 July 2017	16	York City Knights	26-16	Toronto Wolfpack	Bootham Crescent	Beswick, Brierley, Hall	Hall 2/3	2,602
6 August 2017	17	Workington Town	0-68	Toronto Wolfpack	Derwent Park	Wallace (4), Hall (2), Pownall (2), Emmitt, Kay, Laithwaite, Togaga'e	Hall 10/13	592
13 August 2017	18	Keighley Cougars	26-26	Toronto Wolfpack	Cougar Park	Kay, Pownall, Togaga'e, Whiting, Worthington	Hall 3/5	922
19 August 2017	19	Toronto Wolfpack	50-0	Newcastle Thunder	Lamport Stadium	Kay (3), Togaga'e (2), Hall, Jacks, Moimoi, Worthington	Hall 6/9	7,522
2 September 2017	20	Toronto Wolfpack	36-18	Whitehaven	Lamport Stadium	Whiting (2), Beswick, Kay, Pownall, Togaga'e, Wheeler	Hall 4/7	6,134
9 September 2017	21	Toronto Wolfpack	26-2	Barrow Raiders	Lamport Stadium	Wallace (2), Togaga'e, Whiting	Hall 5/5	7,972
16 September 2017	22	Toronto Wolfpack	26-14	Doncaster	Lamport Stadium	Pownall (3), Kay, Wallace	Hall 3/5	8,546

=== Challenge Cup ===
Date	Rnd	Home	Score	Away	Venue	Tries	Goals	Attendance
25 February 2017	3rd	Siddal	6-14	Toronto Wolfpack	Siddal Sports & Community Centre	Burroughs, Sidlow, Worthington	Hall 1/2, Wallace 0/1	1,023
17 March 2017	4th	London Broncos	26-30	Toronto Wolfpack	Trailfinders Sports Ground	Bussey, Hall, Jacks, Kay, Pownall	Hall 5/6	873
23 April 2017	5th	Salford Red Devils	29-22	Toronto Wolfpack	AJ Bell Stadium	Brierley, Kay, Moimoi, Togaga'e	Hall 3/4	1,318

Win Draw Loss

== Players ==
Statistics include Challenge Cup, League 1, and Super 8's matches.

No	Player	Position	Previous club	Apps	Tries	Goals	DG	Points
1	(Samoa) Quentin Laulu-Togaga'e	Fullback	Sheffield Eagles	22	20	0	0	80
2	(England) Jonathan Pownall	Wing	Leigh Centurions	24	26	0	0	104
3	(England) Greg Worthington	Centre	Leigh Centurions	22	15	0	0	60
4	(England) Craig Hall	Centre	Wakefield Trinity	25	24	170	0	436
5	(Republic of Ireland) Liam Kay	Wing	Leigh Centurions	21	27	0	0	108
6	(Australia) Blake Wallace	Stand-off	Illawarra Cutters	19	17	0	0	68
7	(Canada) Rhys Jacks	Scrum-half	Sheffield Eagles	22	6	0	0	24
8	(Tonga) Fuifui Moimoi	Prop	Leigh Centurions	20	12	0	0	48
9	(Republic of Ireland) Bob Beswick	Hooker	Leigh Centurions	23	10	0	0	40
10	(Wales) Daniel Fleming	Prop	Bradford Bulls	15	1	0	0	4
11	(England) Andrew Dixon	Second-row	Leigh Centurions	15	7	0	0	28
12	(England) James Laithwaite	Second-row	Warrington Wolves	17	2	0	0	8
13	(England) Jack Bussey	Loose forward	London Broncos	20	7	0	0	28
14	(England) Gary Wheeler	Stand-off	Warrington Wolves	13	4	0	0	16
15	(United States) Ryan Burroughs	Wing	Wentworthville Magpies	11	5	0	0	20
16	(England) Shaun Pick	Second-row	Featherstone Rovers	8	1	0	0	4
17	(England) Richard Whiting	Second-row	Leigh Centurions	22	11	0	0	44
19	(England) Steve Crossley	Prop	Bradford Bulls	20	2	0	0	8
20	(United States) Tom Dempsey	Prop		3	0	0	0	0
21	(England) Adam Sidlow	Prop	Bradford Bulls	22	4	0	0	16
23	(England) Toby Everett	Prop	London Broncos	3	0	0	0	0
24	(Wales) Sean Penkywicz	Hooker	Leigh Centurions	13	6	0	0	24
25	(England) Ryan Bailey	Prop	Warrington Wolves	8	1	0	0	4
26	(United States) Joe Eichner	Second-row	Jacksonville Axemen	1	0	0	0	0
27	(Scotland) Ryan Brierley	Scrum-half	Leigh Centurions	12	13	0	0	52
28	(Canada) Quinn Ngawati	Second-row	BC Bulldogs	2	0	0	0	0
29	(Wales) Jacob Emmitt	Prop	Swinton Lions	21	1	0	0	4

=== Transfers ===
==== In ====
Nat	Name	Position	Signed from	Date
(England)	Craig Hall	Centre	Wakefield Trinity Wildcats	July 2016
(England)	Liam Kay	Wing	Leigh Centurions	July 2016
(England)	James Laithwaite	Second-row	Warrington Wolves	July 2016
(England)	Gary Wheeler	Stand off	Warrington Wolves	July 2016
(Canada)	Rhys Jacks	Scrum half	Sheffield Eagles	August 2016
(Australia)	Blake Wallace	Scrum half	Illawarra Cutters	August 2016
(Wales)	Dan Fleming	Prop	Bradford Bulls	August 2016
(England)	Reece Dean	Stand off	Hull F.C.	August 2016
(England)	Andrew Dixon	Second-row	Leigh Centurions	August 2016
(England)	Jonathan Pownall	Wing	Leigh Centurions	August 2016
(England)	Jack Bussey	Loose forward	London Broncos	September 2016
(Ireland)	Bob Beswick	Hooker	Leigh Centurions	September 2016
(England)	Greg Worthington	Centre	Leigh Centurions	September 2016
(United States)	Ryan Burroughs	Centre	Wentworthville Magpies	October 2016
(England)	Toby Everett	Prop	London Broncos	October 2016
(England)	Richard Whiting	Centre	Leigh Centurions	November 2016
(England)	Steve Crossley	Prop	Bradford Bulls	November 2016
(Samoa)	Quentin Laulu-Togaga'e	Fullback	Sheffield Eagles	November 2016
(Wales)	Jacob Emmitt	Prop	Swinton Lions	November 2016
(United States)	Jerome Veve	Prop	Gold Coast Titans	November 2016
(Tonga)	Fuifui Moimoi	Prop	Leigh Centurions	November 2016
(Jamaica)	Nathan Campbell	Fullback	Duhaney Park Red Sharks	December 2016
(Canada)	Quinn Ngawati	Stand off	B.C. Bulldogs	December 2016
(United States)	Joe Eichner	Second-row	Jacksonville Axemen	December 2016
(England)	Adam Sidlow	Prop	Bradford Bulls	January 2017
(Canada)	Chad Bain	Prop	Brantford Broncos	January 2017
(England)	Shaun Pick	Prop	Featherstone Rovers	January 2017
(England)	Luke Menzies	Prop	Salford Red Devils	January 2017
(England)	Ryan Bailey	Prop	Retirement	April 2017
(England)	Sean Penkywicz	Hooker	Retirement	April 2017
(England)	Ryan Brierley	Scrum half	Huddersfield Giants	April 2017

==== Out ====
Nat	Name	Position	Club Signed	Date
(United States)	Jerome Veve	Prop	Gold Coast Titans	January 2017
(England)	Luke Menzies	Prop	Professional Wrestling	April 2017
(England)	Reece Dean	Centre	Doncaster	May 2017

== Milestones ==
- CCR3: Quentin Togaga'e, Jonathan Pownall, Greg Worthington, James Laithwaite, Ryan Burroughs, Blake Wallace, Rhys Jacks, Jacob Emmitt, Bob Beswick, Steve Crossley, Andrew Dixon, Richard Whiting, Jack Bussey, Craig Hall, Fuifui Moimoi, Adam Sidlow and Shaun Pick all made their debuts for the Wolfpack.
- CCR3: Ryan Burroughs, Greg Worthington and Adam Sidlow all scored their 1st tries for the Wolfpack.
- CCR3: Craig Hall kicked his 1st goal for the Wolfpack.
- Round 1: Liam Kay and Gary Wheeler made their debuts for the Wolfpack.
- Round 1: Craig Hall, Jonathan Pownall, Fuifui Moimoi, Bob Beswick, Liam Kay, Andrew Dixon and Quentin Togaga'e scored their 1st tries for the Wolfpack.
- Round 1: Fuifui Moimoi scored his 1st hat-trick for the Wolfpack.
- Round 2: Toby Everett made his debut for the Wolfpack.
- CCR4: Dan Fleming made his debut for the Wolfpack.
- CCR4: Jack Bussey and Rhys Jacks scored their 1st try for the Wolfpack.
- Round 3: Blake Wallace scored his 1st try for the Wolfpack.
- Round 4: Jack Bussey scored his 1st hat-trick for the Wolfpack.
- Round 4: Richard Whiting scored his 1st try for the Wolfpack.
- Round 5: Sean Penkywicz and Ryan Bailey made their debuts for the Wolfpack.
- Round 5: Sean Penkywicz and Gary Wheeler scored their 1st tries for the Wolfpack.
- Round 5: Craig Hall scored his 1st hat-trick for the Wolfpack.
- Round 5: Craig Hall reached 100 points for the Wolfpack.
- CCR5: Ryan Brierley made his debut for the Wolfpack.
- CCR5: Ryan Brierley scored his 1st try for the Wolfpack.
- Round 8: Quentin Togaga'e scored his 1st hat-trick for the Wolfpack.
- Round 8: Ryan Bailey and Shaun Pick scored their 1st try for the Wolfpack.
- Round 9: Tom Dempsey and Joe Eichner made their debut for the Wolfpack.
- Round 9: Liam Kay scored his 1st hat-trick for the Wolfpack.
- Round 9: Craig Hall reached 200 points for the Wolfpack.
- Round 11: Craig Hall kicked his 100th goal for the Wolfpack.
- Round 12: Quentin Togaga'e scored his 2nd hat-trick for the Wolfpack.
- Round 12: James Laithwaite scored his 1st try for the Wolfpack.
- Round 13: Liam Kay scored his 1st five-try haul, his 1st four-try haul and 2nd hat-trick for the Wolfpack.
- Round 14: Quinn Ngawati made his debut for the Wolfpack.
- Round 14: Steve Crossley scored his 1st try for the Wolfpack.
- Round 14: Craig Hall reached 300 points for the Wolfpack.
- Round 15: Craig Hall scored his 1st four-try haul and 2nd hat-trick for the Wolfpack.
- Round 15: Blake Wallace scored his 1st hat-trick for the Wolfpack.
- Round 15: Dan Fleming scored his 1st try for the Wolfpack.
- Super 8s Game 2: Blake Wallace scored his 1st four-try haul and 2nd hat-trick for the Wolfpack.
- Super 8s Game 2: Jacob Emmitt scored his 1st try for the Wolfpack.
- Super 8s Game 4: Liam Kay scored his 3rd hat-trick for the Wolfpack.
- Super 8s Game 4: Liam Kay scored his 25th try and reached 100 points for the Wolfpack.
- Super 8s Game 4: Craig Hall reached 400 points for the Wolfpack.
- Super 8s Game 7: Jonathan Pownall scored his 1st hat-trick for the Wolfpack.
- Super 8s Game 7: Jonathan Pownall scored his 25th try and reached 100 points for the Wolfpack.
