= Toronto Wolfpack records and statistics =

This is a list of all the records and statistics of rugby league side the Toronto Wolfpack. It concentrates on the records of the team and the performances of the players who have played for this team. The newly created Wolfpack played their first game against Siddal ARFLC in the 2017 Challenge Cup on 25 February 2017, Toronto won the match 14–6. As of 5 October 2019 the Wolfpack have played 88 games.

== Team records ==
=== Matches played ===
1st game	Matches	Won	Lost	Drawn	Points for	Points against	% won
22 January 2017	95	78	15	2	3478	1484	.880
Source:. Last updated: 11 March 2020.

=== Results summary ===
Opposition	Span	Pld	W	L	D	For	Agst	% won
Barrow Raiders	2017–2019	7	6	0	1	298	58	85.71
Batley Bulldogs	2018–2019	4	4	0	0	164	58	100.00
Bradford Bulls	2019	2	2	0	0	61	36	100.00
Castleford Tigers	2020–	1	0	1	0	10	28	00.00
Coventry Bears	2017	1	1	0	0	54	12	100.00
Dewsbury Rams	2018–2019	4	4	0	0	179	49	100.00
Doncaster	2017	2	2	0	0	108	20	100.00
Featherstone Rovers	2018–2019	5	4	1	0	105	84	80.00
Gloucestershire All Golds	2017	1	1	0	0	62	10	100.00
Halifax	2018–2019	5	5	0	0	158	40	100.00
Hemel Stags	2017	1	1	0	0	74	16	100.00
Huddersfield Giants	2020–	1	1	0	0	18	0	100.00
Hull Kingston Rovers	2018–	1	0	1	0	22	28	00.00
Hunslet	2017	1	1	0	0	56	12	100.00
Keighley Cougars	2017	2	1	0	1	74	47	50.00
Kells	2018	1	1	0	0	56	6	100.00
Leeds Rhinos	2018–2020	2	1	1	0	29	82	50.00
Leigh Centurions	2018–2019	5	5	0	0	168	86	100.00
London Broncos	2017–2018	5	3	2	0	114	111	60.00
London Skolars	2017	1	1	0	0	76	0	100.00
Newcastle Thunder	2017	2	2	0	0	90	22	100.00
North Wales Crusaders	2017	1	1	0	0	80	0	100.00
Oxford	2017	1	1	0	0	62	12	100.00
Rochdale Hornets	2018–2019	4	4	0	0	174	33	100.00
Salford Red Devils	2017–2020	3	0	3	0	54	81	00.00
Siddal	2017	1	1	0	0	14	6	100.00
Sheffield Eagles	2018–2019	4	4	0	0	194	40	100.00
West Wales Raiders	2017	1	1	0	0	66	0	100.00
St Helens	2020–	1	0	1	0	0	32	00.00
Swinton Lions	2018–2019	4	4	0	0	200	50	100.00
Toulouse Olympique	2018–2019	7	6	1	0	206	164	85.71
Warrington Wolves	2018–2020	2	0	2	0	32	98	00.00
Whitehaven	2017	2	2	0	0	60	28	100.00
Widnes Vikings	2018–2019	3	3	0	0	74	37	100.00
Wigan Warriors	2020–	1	0	1	0	10	32	00.00
Workington Town	2017	2	2	0	0	126	12	100.00
York City Knights	2017–2019	4	3	1	0	150	54	75.00
Source:. Last updated: 11 March 2020.

- Italics: Club folded

=== Top 10 highest scores ===
Rank	Score	Opposition	Competition	Venue	Date
1	82-6	Doncaster	RFL League 1	(England) Keepmoat Stadium, Doncaster, South Yorkshire	9 April 2017
2	80-0	North Wales Crusaders	2017 League 1	(Wales) Queensway Stadium, Wrexham, Wrexham County Borough	14 April 2017
3	76-0	London Skolars	2017 League 1	(England) New River Stadium, London, Greater London	5 March 2017
4	74-16	Hemel Stags	2017 League 1	(Canada) Lamport Stadium, Toronto, Ontario	15 July 2017
5	70-2	Barrow Raiders	2017 League 1	(Canada) Lamport Stadium, Toronto, Ontario	20 May 2017
6	70-8	Dewsbury Rams	2019 Championship	(Canada) Lamport Stadium, Toronto, Ontario	15 June 2019
7	68-0	Workington Town	2017 League 1	(England) Derwent Park, Workington, Cumbria	6 August 2017
8	68-4	Sheffield Eagles	2018 Championship	(Canada) Lamport Stadium, Toronto, Ontario	7 July 2018
9	66-0	South Wales Ironmen	2017 League 1	(Wales) The Wern, Merthyr Tydfil, Glamorgan	11 June 2017
10	64-0	Barrow Raiders	2018 Championship	(Canada) Lamport Stadium, Toronto, Ontario	23 June 2018
Last updated: 11 March 2020.

=== Lowest scores ===
Rank	Score	Opposition	Competition	Venue	Date
1	0-32	vs. St Helens R.F.C.	2020 Super League	(England) Halliwell Jones Stadium, Warrington, Cheshire	29 February 2020
2	2-4	vs. London Broncos	2018 Qualifiers	(Canada) Lamport Stadium, Toronto, Ontario	7 October 2018
3	8-8	vs. Barrow Raiders	2018 Championship	(England) Craven Park, Barrow-in-Furness, Cumbria	11 February 2018
4	10-28	vs. Castleford Tigers	2020 Super League	(England) Headingley Stadium, Leeds, West Yorkshire	2 February 2020
5	10-32	vs. Wigan Warriors	2020 Super League	(England) DW Stadium, Wigan, Greater Manchester	13 February 2020
6	10-66	vs. Warrington Wolves	2018 Challenge Cup	(England) Halliwell Jones Stadium, Warrington, Cheshire	13 May 2018
7	12-30	vs. Featherstone Rovers	2018 Championship	(Canada) Lamport Stadium, Toronto, Ontario	28 July 2018
8	12-66	vs. Leeds Rhinos	2020 Super League	(England) Headingley Stadium, Leeds, West Yorkshire	5 March 2020
9	13-12	vs. Toulouse Olympique	2018 Qualifiers	(Canada) Lamport Stadium, Toronto, Ontario	15 September 2018
10	14-0	vs. Halifax R.L.F.C.	2018 Qualifiers	(England) Shay Stadium, Halifax, West Yorkshire	12 August 2018
11	14-0	vs. York City Knights	2019 Championship	(England) Bootham Crescent, York, North Yorkshire	3 February 2019
Source:. Last updated: 11 March 2020.

=== Biggest wins ===
Rank	Margin	Opposition	Competition	Venue	Date
1	80 points	vs. North Wales Crusaders	2017 League 1	(Wales) Queensway Stadium, Wrexham, Wrexham County Borough	14 April 2017
2	76 points	vs. London Skolars	2017 League 1	(England) New River Stadium, London, Greater London	5 March 2017
3	76 points	vs. Doncaster R.L.F.C.	2017 League 1	(England) Keepmoat Stadium, Doncaster, South Yorkshire	9 April 2017
4	68 points	vs. Barrow Raiders	2017 League 1	(Canada) Lamport Stadium, Toronto, Ontario	20 May 2017
5	68 points	vs. Workington Town	2017 League 1	(England) Derwent Park, Workington, Cumbria	6 August 2017
6	66 points	vs. South Wales Ironmen	2017 League 1	(Wales) The Wern, Merthyr Tydfil, Glamorgan	11 June 2017
7	64 points	vs. Barrow Raiders	2018 Championship	(Canada) Lamport Stadium, Toronto, Ontario	23 June 2018
8	64 points	vs. Sheffield Eagles	2018 Championship	(Canada) Lamport Stadium, Toronto, Ontario	7 July 2018
9	62 points	vs. Dewsbury Rams	2019 Championship	(Canada) Lamport Stadium, Toronto, Ontario	15 June 2019
10	58 points	vs. Hemel Stags	2017 League 1	(Canada) Lamport Stadium, Toronto, Ontario	15 July 2017
Source:. Last updated: 11 March 2020.

=== Biggest losses ===
Rank	Margin	Opposition	Competition	Venue	Date
1	56 points	vs. Warrington Wolves	2018 Challenge Cup	(England) Halliwell Jones Stadium, Warrington, Cheshire	13 May 2018
2	54 points	vs. Leeds Rhinos	2020 Super League	(England) Headingley Stadium, Leeds, West Yorkshire	5 March 2020
3	32 points	vs. St Helens R.F.C.	2020 Super League	(England) Halliwell Jones Stadium, Warrington, Cheshire	29 February 2020
4	31 points	vs. London Broncos	2018 Championship	(England) Trailfinders Sports Ground, West Ealing, Greater London	25 February 2018
5	30 points	vs. Toulouse Olympique	2019 Championship	Stade Ernest-Argelès, Blagnac, France	9 March 2019
6	22 points	vs. Wigan Warriors	2020 Super League	(England) DW Stadium, Wigan, Greater Manchester	13 February 2020
7	18 points	vs. Featherstone Rovers	2018 Championship	(Canada) Lamport Stadium, Toronto, Ontario	28 July 2018
8	18 points	vs. Castleford Tigers	2020 Super League	(England) Headingley Stadium, Leeds, West Yorkshire	2 February 2020
9	12 points	vs. Salford Red Devils	2018 Qualifiers	(England) AJ Bell Stadium, Barton-upon-Irwell, Greater Manchester	8 September 2018
10	10 points	vs. York City Knights	2017 League 1	(England) Bootham Crescent, York, North Yorkshire	30 July 2017
11	10 points	vs. Warrington Wolves	2020 Super League	(England) Halliwell Jones Stadium, Warrington, Cheshire	21 February 2020
Source:. Last updated: 11 March 2020.

== Individual records ==
=== Most matches as captain ===
Name	Years as captain	Total	Won	Lost	Drawn
(England) Craig Hall	2017	25	22	2	1
(Australia) Josh McCrone	2018–present	65	51	13	1
(Australia) Ashton Sims	2018–2019	4	4	0	0
(England) Greg Worthington	2018–present	1	1	0	0
Source: Last updated: 11 March 2020.

=== Most career appearances ===
Rank	Apps	Player	Span
1	80	(England) Adam Sidlow	2017–present
2	74	(Australia) Blake Wallace	2017–present
3	73	(England) Andrew Dixon	2017–present
4	70	(England) Liam Kay	2017–present
5	66	(England) Andy Ackers	2018–present
6	65	(England) Bob Beswick	2017–2019
7	65	(Australia) Josh McCrone	2018–present
8	56	(England) Gareth O'Brien	2018–present
9	52	(England) Greg Worthington	2017–present
10	51	(England) Jacob Emmitt	2017–2019
Source: Last updated: 11 March 2020.

=== Most career points ===
Rank	Points	Player	Span
1	482	(England) Gareth O'Brien	2018–present
2	436	(England) Craig Hall	2017
3	284	(Australia) Blake Wallace	2017–present
4	272	(England) Ryan Brierley	2017–2019
5	260	(England) Liam Kay	2017–present
6	148	(England) Matty Russell	2018–present
7	124	(England) Jonathan Pownall	2017–2018
8	112	(England) Andrew Dixon	2017–present
9	112	(England) Andy Ackers	2018–present
10	108	(England) Nick Rawsthorne	2018–2019
Source:. Last updated: 11 March 2020.

=== Most career tries ===
Rank	Tries	Player	Span
1	65	(England) Liam Kay	2017–present
2	50	(Australia) Blake Wallace	2017–present
3	37	(England) Matty Russell	2018–present
4	33	(England) Gareth O'Brien	2018–present
5	31	(England) Jonathan Pownall	2017–2018
6	28	(England) Andrew Dixon	2017–present
7	28	(England) Andy Ackers	2018–present
8	27	(England) Nick Rawsthorne	2018–2019
9	26	(England) Ryan Brierley	2017–2019
10	24	(England) Craig Hall	2017
Source: Last updated: 11 March 2020.

=== Most career goals ===
Rank	Goals	Player	Span
1	174	(England) Gareth O'Brien	2018–present
2	170	(England) Craig Hall	2017
3	83	(England) Ryan Brierley	2017–2019
4	42	(Australia) Blake Wallace	2017–present
5	4	(France) Hakim Miloudi	2019–present
6	1	(Australia) Josh McCrone	2018–present
Source: Last updated: 11 March 2020.

=== Most career drop goals ===
Rank	DG's	Player	Span
1	2	(England) Ryan Brierley	2017–present
2	2	(England) Gareth O'Brien	2018–present
3	1	(Australia) Josh McCrone	2018–present
4	1	(France) Hakim Miloudi	2019–present
Source: Last updated: 11 March 2020.

=== Most points in a season ===
Rank	Points	Player	Season
1	436 points	(England) Craig Hall	2017
2	278 points	(England) Gareth O'Brien	2019
3	214 points	(England) Ryan Brierley	2018
4	186 points	(England) Gareth O'Brien	2018
5	134 points	(Australia) Blake Wallace	2019
6	108 points	(England) Liam Kay	2017
7	108 points	(England) Matty Russell	2019
8	104 points	(England) Jonathan Pownall	2017
9	104 points	(England) Liam Kay	2018
Source: Last updated: 5 October 2019.

=== Most tries in a season ===
Rank	Tries	Player	Season
1	27 tries	(England) Liam Kay	2017
2	27 tries	(England) Matty Russell	2019
3	26 tries	(England) Liam Kay	2018
4	26 tries	(England) Jonathan Pownall	2017
5	24 tries	(England) Craig Hall	2017
6	20 tries	(New Zealand) Quentin Laulu-Togaga'e	2017
7	20 tries	(England) Gareth O'Brien	2019
Source: Last updated: 5 October 2019.

=== Most goals in a season ===
Rank	Goals	Player	Season
1	170 goals	(England) Craig Hall	2017
2	99 goals	(England) Gareth O'Brien	2019
3	82 goals	(England) Ryan Brierley	2018
4	68 goals	(England) Gareth O'Brien	2018
Source: Last updated: 5 October 2019.

=== Most drop goals in a season ===
Rank	DG's	Player	Season
1	2	(England) Ryan Brierley	2018
2	2	(England) Gareth O'Brien	2018
Source: Last updated: 5 October 2019.

=== Most points in a match ===
Rank	Points	Player	Opposition	Competition	Venue	Date
1	38 points	(England) Craig Hall	vs. Hemel Stags	2017 League 1	(Canada) Lamport Stadium, Toronto, Ontario	15 July 2017
2	36 points	(England) Craig Hall	vs. North Wales Crusaders	2017 League 1	(Wales) Queensway Stadium, Wrexham, Clwyd	14 April 2017
3	28 points	(England) Craig Hall	vs. London Skolars	2017 League 1	(England) New River Stadium, London, Greater London	5 March 2017
4	28 points	(England) Craig Hall	vs. Workington Town	2017 League 1	(England) Derwent Park, Workington, Cumbria	6 August 2017
5	28 points	(England) Gareth O'Brien	vs. Dewsbury Rams	2018 Championship	(Canada) Lamport Stadium, Toronto, Ontario	16 June 2018
6	28 points	(Australia) Blake Wallace	vs. Barrow Raiders	2019 Championship	(England) Craven Park, Barrow-in-Furness, Cumbria	19 April 2019
7	26 points	(England) Craig Hall	vs. Doncaster R.L.F.C.	2017 League 1	(England) Keepmoat Stadium, Doncaster, South Yorkshire	9 April 2017
8	26 points	(England) Craig Hall	vs. Workington Town	2017 League 1	(England) Derwent Park, Workington, Cumbria	18 June 2017
9	26 points	(England) Craig Hall	vs. Gloucestershire All Golds	2017 League 1	(Canada) Lamport Stadium, Toronto, Ontario	8 July 2017
10	26 points	(England) Gareth O'Brien	vs. Dewsbury Rams	2019 Championship	(Canada) Lamport Stadium, Toronto, Ontario	15 June 2019
Source: Last updated: 5 October 2019

=== Most tries in a match ===
Rank	Tries	Player	Opposition	Competition	Venue	Date
1	5 tries	(England) Liam Kay	vs. York City Knights	2017 League 1	(Canada) Lamport Stadium, Toronto, Ontario	1 July 2017
2	4 tries	(England) Craig Hall	vs. Hemel Stags	2017 League 1	(Canada) Lamport Stadium, Toronto, Ontario	15 July 2017
3	4 tries	(Australia) Blake Wallace	vs. Workington Town	2017 League 1	(England) Derwent Park, Workington, Cumbria	6 August 2017
4	4 tries	(England) Matty Russell	vs. Rochdale Hornets	2019 Championship	(England) Spotland Stadium, Rochdale, Greater Manchester	10 February 2019
Source: Last updated: 5 October 2019.

=== Most goals in a match ===
Rank	Goals	Player	Opposition	Competition	Venue	Date
1	13 goals	(England) Craig Hall	vs. Doncaster R.L.F.C.	2017 League 1	(England) Keepmoat Stadium, Doncaster, South Yorkshire	9 April 2017
2	12 goals	(England) Craig Hall	vs. London Skolars	2017 League 1	(England) New River Stadium, London, Greater London	5 March 2017
3	12 goals	(England) Craig Hall	vs. North Wales Crusaders	2017 League 1	(Wales) Queensway Stadium, Wrexham, Clwyd	14 April 2017
4	11 goals	(England) Craig Hall	vs. Barrow Raiders	2017 League 1	(Canada) Lamport Stadium, Toronto, Ontario	20 May 2017
5	11 goals	(England) Craig Hall	vs. Hemel Stags	2017 League 1	(Canada) Lamport Stadium, Toronto, Ontario	15 July 2017
6	11 goals	(England) Gareth O'Brien	vs. Dewsbury Rams	2019 Championship	(Canada) Lamport Stadium, Toronto, Ontario	15 June 2019
7	10 goals	(England) Craig Hall	vs. Workington Town	2017 League 1	(England) Derwent Park, Workington, Cumbria	6 August 2017
8	10 goals	(England) Gareth O'Brien	vs. Dewsbury Rams	2018 Championship	(Canada) Lamport Stadium, Toronto, Ontario	16 June 2018
9	10 goals	(England) Gareth O'Brien	vs. Sheffield Eagles	2018 Championship	(Canada) Lamport Stadium, Toronto, Ontario	7 July 2018
Source: Last updated: 5 October 2019.

=== Most drop goals in a match ===
Rank	DG's	Player	Opposition	Competition	Venue	Date
1	1	(England) Ryan Brierley	vs. Dewsbury Rams	2018 Championship	(England) Crown Flatt, Dewsbury, West Yorkshire	15 April 2018
2	1	(England) Ryan Brierley	vs. Toulouse Olympique	2018 Championship	(England) St James' Park, Newcastle upon Tyne, Tyne and Wear	19 May 2018
3	1	(England) Gareth O'Brien	vs. Toulouse Olympique	2018 Qualifiers	(Canada) Lamport Stadium, Toronto, Ontario	15 September 2018
4	1	(England) Gareth O'Brien	vs. Leeds Rhinos	2018 Qualifiers	(England) Headingley Stadium, Leeds, West Yorkshire	28 September 2018
5	1	(Australia) Josh McCrone	vs. Featherstone Rovers	2019 Championship	(England) Post Office Road, Featherstone, West Yorkshire	22 April 2019
6	1	(France) Hakim Miloudi	vs. Bradford Bulls	2019 Championship	(England) Odsal Stadium, Bradford, West Yorkshire	4 August 2019
Source: Last updated: 5 October 2019.

== Attendance records ==
=== Season average attendance ===
Rank	Average	Highest	Opposition	Season
1	7,882	9,974	vs. Featherstone Rovers	2019
2	6,992	8,546	vs. Doncaster R.L.F.C.	2017
3	6,908	9,266	vs. London Broncos	2018
Source: Last updated: 5 October 2019.

=== Highest match attendance ===
Rank	Att	Opposition	Competition	Date
1	9,974	vs. Featherstone Rovers	2019 Championship	5 October 2019
2	9,562	vs. Swinton Lions	2019 Championship	28 April 2019
3	9,325	vs. Toulouse Olympique	2019 Championship	22 September 2019
4	9,266	vs. London Broncos	2018 Qualifiers	7 October 2018
5	8,546	vs. Doncaster R.L.F.C.	2017 League 1	16 September 2017
6	8,363	vs. Bradford Bulls	2019 Championship	4 May 2019
7	8,281	vs. Widnes Vikings	2018 Qualifiers	22 September 2018
8	8,217	vs. Featherstone Rovers	2018 Championship	28 July 2018
9	8,125	vs. Leigh Centurions	2019 Championship	7 September 2019
10	7,972	vs. Barrow Raiders	2017 League 1	9 September 2017
Source: Last updated: 5 October 2019.

== Coaching ==
Name	Years as coach	Total	Won	Lost	Drawn
(England) Paul Rowley	2017–2018	59	49	8	2
(England) Brian McDermott	2019–2020	36	29	7	0
Source: Last updated: 11 March 2020.
