= Quinn Ngawati =

Canada international dual-code rugby player (born 1999)

Personal information
- Born: 15 June 1999 (age 26) Victoria, British Columbia, Canada
- Height: 6 ft 4 in (1.93 m)
- Weight: 220 lb (15 st 10 lb; 100 kg)

Playing information

Rugby league
- Position: Centre, Second-row, Stand-off
Club
Years	Team	Pld	T	G	FG	P
2017–18	Toronto Wolfpack	3	0	0	0	0
2018(loan)	→ London Skolars	9	1	0	0	4
2020–20	Toronto Wolfpack	0	0	0	0	0
	Total	12	1	0	0	4
Representative
Years	Team	Pld	T	G	FG	P
2017	Canada	1	0	3	0	6

Rugby union
- Position: Centre, Wing
Club
Years	Team	Pld	T	G	FG	P
2021–	Rugby New York	30	2	0	0	10
2022	Mid Canterbury	3	0	0	0	0
	Total	33	2	0	0	10
Representative
Years	Team	Pld	T	G	FG	P
2021	Canada	6	0	0	0	0
- Source: As of 29 January 2021

Quinn Ngawati (born 15 June 1999) is a Canadian rugby union player currently playing for Rugby New York (Ironworkers) of Major League Rugby (MLR) in the U.S.

He formerly represented the Toronto Wolfpack in the Super League, becoming the first Canadian-born player to play professional rugby league.

== Background ==
Ngawati was born in Victoria, British Columbia, Canada. He is of Māori descent through his New Zealand born father. He is a graduate of the renowned boarding school, St. Michaels University School where he captained the school's rugby team to a Provincial Championship.

== Playing career ==
=== Rugby League ===
Ngawati has represented Canada at both rugby league and rugby union at age-grade level; playing league for the under-17 team and union for the under-19 team.

After attending a tryout for Toronto Wolfpack in Vancouver, Ngawati was one of three players to make the cut after attending the Wolfpack training camp in Brighouse, West Yorkshire, England. His professional debut came in round 14 of the 2017 season when he came on as an interchange player in the 55th minute of the game against Gloucestershire All Golds. Ngawati made his debut for the Canadian national team on 16 September 2017, kicking 3 goals against the United States.

In March 2018, Ngawati was sent on loan, along with Wolfpack teammate Ryan Burroughs, to League 1 side London Skolars, for the remainder of the 2018 season. Recalled by Toronto in June 2018 he made his final appearance for the Wolfpack against Featherstone Rovers on 23 July 2018. In October 2018 it was announced that Ngawati was leaving the club and the sport to return to British Columbia to pursue a career in aviation.

In March 2020 he had a change of heart and returned to rugby league re-joining Toronto.

=== Rugby Union ===
On October 2, 2020, it was announced that he had switched codes to sign for Rugby United New York for the upcoming Major League Rugby season
