= Paul Rowley =

English rugby league coach and former international

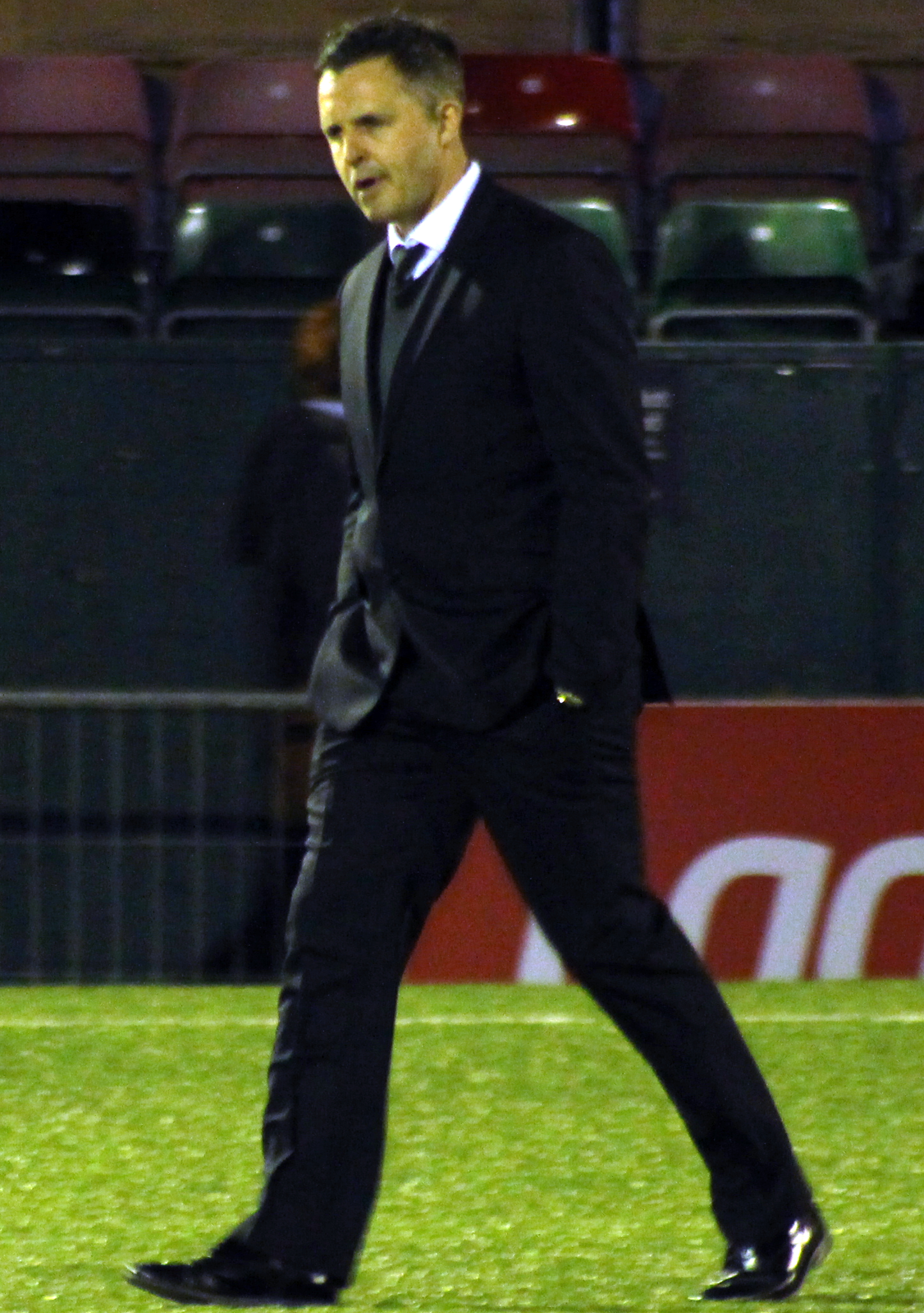

Personal information
- Full name: Paul Alun Rowley
- Born: 12 March 1975 (age 51) Leigh, Greater Manchester, England

Playing information
- Position: Hooker
Club
Years	Team	Pld	T	G	FG	P
1992–94	Leigh	50	16	0	0	64
1994–00	Halifax Blue Sox	170	40	1	3	165
2001	Huddersfield Giants	27	5	0	0	20
2002–07	Leigh Centurions	148	54	0	2	218
	Total	395	115	1	5	467
Representative
Years	Team	Pld	T	G	FG	P
1996–00	England	4	2	0	0	8

Coaching information
Club
Years	Team	Gms	W	D	L	W%
2009	Leigh Centurions
2012–16	Leigh Centurions	130	101	1	28	78
2017–18	Toronto Wolfpack	53	45	2	6	85
2022–25	Salford Red Devils	117	50	0	67	43
2026	St Helens	23	15	0	8	65
2027–	Castleford Tigers	0	0	0	0
	Total	323	211	3	109	65
- Source: As of 3 November 2026

Paul Rowley (born 12 March 1975) is an English professional rugby league coach, who is the head coach of the Castleford Tigers in the Super League, and former professional rugby league footballer who played in the 1990s and 2000s.

An England international hooker, he played at club level for Leigh, Halifax and Huddersfield. After retiring as a player, Rowley began a coaching career and was appointed head coach of Leigh in 2012, leading the club to Championship titles in 2014 and 2015 before departing at the beginning of the 2016 season. He subsequently was the head coach of the Toronto Wolfpack in the Championship.

== Background ==
Rowley was born in Leigh, Greater Manchester, England.

== Playing career ==
Having begun his career at his hometown club, Leigh, Rowley appeared in the Super League for Halifax and the Huddersfield Giants, returning to his hometown club in 2002. He retired as a player in April 2007 after his 400th career appearance, and joined the coaching staff at Leigh Centurions.

=== International honours ===
Rowley won caps for England while at Halifax in 1996 against France (sub), and in the 2000 Rugby League World Cup against Australia, Russia, and Ireland.

== Coaching career ==
=== Leigh Centurions ===
Rowley was appointed first team coach of Leigh Centurions on a permanent basis in January 2012. After a successful first season in charge which included guiding the club to 2nd in the Championship and a Northern Rail Cup semi-final, Rowley was named Championship Coach of the year. In February 2013 Rowley signed a new contract to keep him at the club until the end of 2015. Having won back-to-back Championship titles with Leigh in 2014 and 2015, Rowley resigned as Leigh Centurions head coach 10 days before the start of the 2016 Championship season, citing personal reasons.

=== Toronto Wolfpack ===
On 27 April 2016 he was confirmed as the inaugural head coach of the Toronto Wolfpack.

=== Salford Red Devils ===
On 5 November 2021, Rowley was announced as the new head-coach of the Salford Red Devils. In Rowley's first season in charge of Salford, the club started poorly and at one stage were sitting second last on the table before they went on to win eleven games which saw them qualify for the playoffs. After upsetting Huddersfield 28–0 in week one of the playoffs, the club played against St Helens in the semi-final in which they lost 19–12. In the 2023 Super League season, Rowley guided Salford to a 7th-placed finish as the club missed the playoffs by two points. In the 2024 Super League season, Rowley took Salford to the playoffs again but they were eliminated in the first week by Leigh. In 2025, Salford were hit with major financial issues and a limited playing squad. Under Rowley, the club would finish bottom of the Super League recording just three wins for the entire season.

=== St Helens ===
In November 2025, Rowley was appointed as the new head coach of St Helens. In Rowley's first game in charge of St Helens, the club would win 98-2 against Workington Town in the third round of the Challenge Cup. In round 18 of the 2026 Super League season under Rowley, St Helens would lose 46-0 at home against Toulouse Olympique. It was the first time since the competition had been rebranded as the Super League that St Helens had been held scoreless at home and the first time they had been held scoreless at home in any game since 1980.

On 23 July 2026 it was reported that he had stood down and left the club with immediate effect, with current assistant coach Eamon O'Carroll taking over in the interim

=== Castleford Tigers ===
On 13 October 2026 it was reported that he had taken the role of head-coach for Castleford Tigers in the Super League

== Personal life ==
Paul Rowley is the son of the rugby league prop who played in the 1970s and 1980s for Leigh, Workington Town, St. Helens and Carlisle; Allan Rowley (born 1951 (age 74–75)). Paul Rowley has two sons, Alex and Oliver.

== Honours ==
=== As a player ===
- National League One: 2004

=== As a coach ===
- Championship (3): 2014, 2015, 2018
- League 1 (1): 2017

==== Individual ====
- Championship Coach of the Year: 2013
