= Jack Bussey =

English rugby league footballer

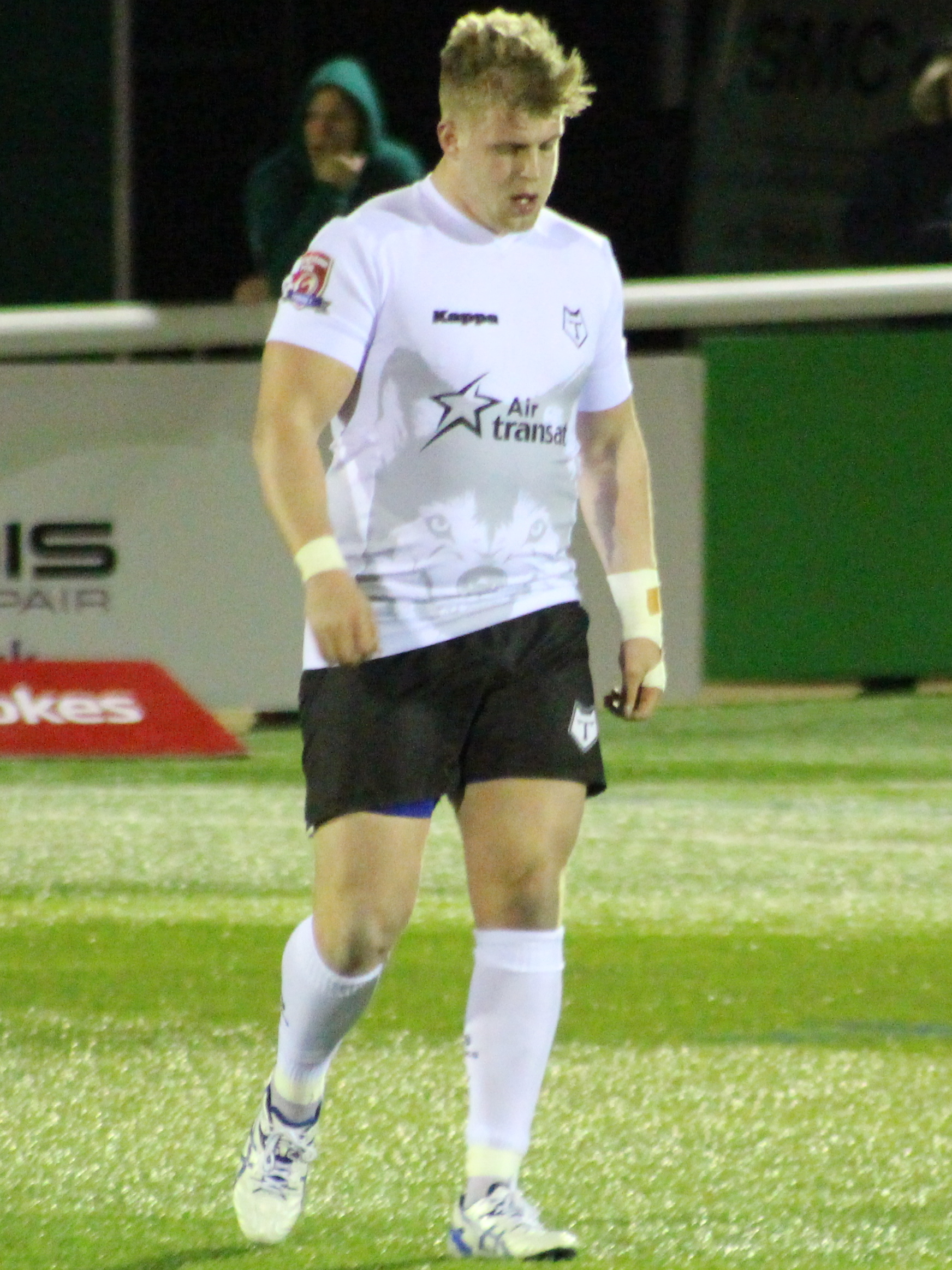

Personal information
- Born: 17 August 1992 (age 34) Leeds, West Yorkshire, England
- Height: 5 ft 11 in (1.81 m)
- Weight: 16 st 10 lb (106 kg)

Playing information
- Position: Loose forward, Stand-off
Club
Years	Team	Pld	T	G	FG	P
2012–15	Featherstone Rovers	69	11	9	0	62
2016	London Broncos	28	6	2	0	28
2017–18	Toronto Wolfpack	36	8	0	0	32
2019–24	Featherstone Rovers	89	29	4	0	124
2025–	Sheffield Eagles	21	2	0	0	8
	Total	243	56	15	0	254
- Source: As of 25 February 2026

Jack "Bus" Bussey (born 17 August 1992) is an English rugby league footballer who plays as a loose forward, second-row or stand-off for the Sheffield Eagles in the Championship.

He previously played for the London Broncos, Featherstone Rovers and the Toronto Wolfpack in the Championship.

== Background ==
Bussey was born in Leeds, West Yorkshire, England.

== Playing career ==
He signed for the Toronto Wolfpack from the 2017 season. Bussey made his début in the third round of the 2017 Challenge Cup.

In May 2017 Bussey underwent emergency surgery for thyroid cancer, which was a success with the cancer being removed.

=== Sheffield Eagles ===
On 21 December 2024, it was reported that he had signed for Sheffield in the RFL Championship.
