= Sean Penkywicz =

Wales international rugby league footballer

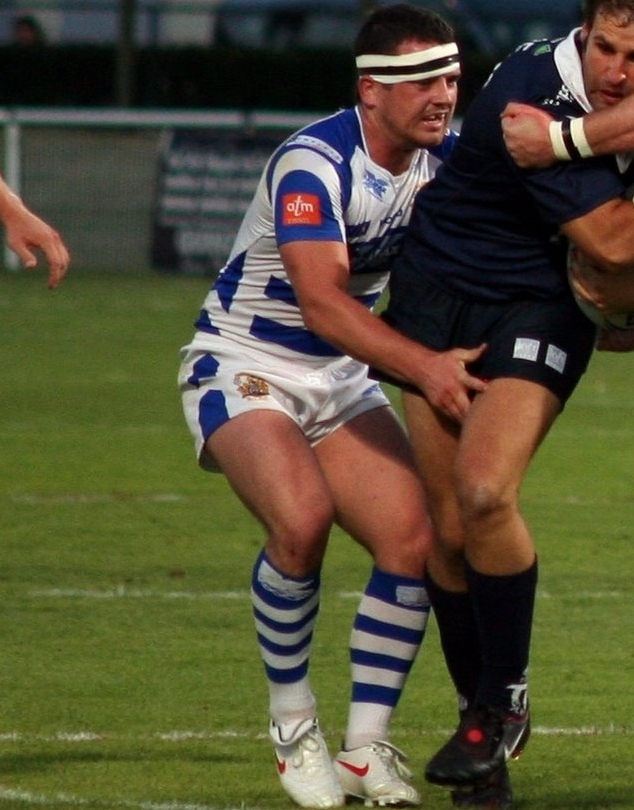

Personal information
- Full name: Sean Penkywicż
- Born: 18 May 1982 (age 43); Leigh, Greater Manchester, England
- Height: 5 ft 7 in (1.70 m)
- Weight: 14 st 2 lb (90 kg)

Playing information
- Position: Stand-off, Scrum-half, Hooker
Club
Years	Team	Pld	T	G	FG	P
2000–03	Halifax	59	8	0	0	32
2004–05	Huddersfield Giants	36	9	0	0	36
2007–12	Halifax	163	89	0	1	357
2013–15	Leigh Centurions	71	22	0	0	88
2017	Toronto Wolfpack	13	6	0	0	24
2018–19	Workington Town	47	22	0	0	88
2020–22	Rochdale Hornets	31	9	2	0	40
	Total	420	165	2	1	665
Representative
Years	Team	Pld	T	G	FG	P
2007–08	Wales	4	4	1	0	4
- Source: As of 8 January 2022

Sean Penkywicz (born 18 May 1982) is a former Wales international rugby league footballer who last played as a hooker for the Rochdale Hornets in RFL League 1.

He has played at club level in the Super League for Halifax (two spells, including the second in the Championship), the Huddersfield Giants, in the Championship for the Leigh Centurions, in the inaugural 2017 season for the Toronto Wolfpack, and for Workington Town in Betfred League 1, as a stand-off, scrum-half or hooker.

== Playing career ==
Sean Penkywicz was born in Leigh, Greater Manchester, England.

=== Halifax RLFC ===
Beginning his career with Halifax, Penkywicz made his Super League début in 2000.

=== Huddersfield Giants ===
He left Halifax and joined the Huddersfield Giants in 2004 following Halifax's relegation from the Super League. In 2005, Penkywicz was banned for two years after testing positive for steroid use.

=== Halifax RLFC (rejoined) ===
In 2007 he rejoined Halifax in the Championship, where he went on to help the West Yorkshire outfit to a period of sustained success that included 2 Grand Final appearances in a row (2009 & 2010) and 2 Northern Rail Cup Final appearances in a row (2011 & 2012). Fax would win the Grand Final in 2010 beating Featherstone Rovers 23-22 before Penkywicz captained the blue and whites to Northern Rail Cup glory in 2012, again beating the lowly Rovers in a grandstand finale.

=== Leigh Centurions ===
After 5 seasons with Halifax, Penkywicz joined the Leigh Centurions in 2013. His contract was terminated in 2015 after failing a drugs test.

=== Toronto Wolfpack ===
Penkywicz joined the Toronto Wolfpack on a short-term contract, making 13 appearances for the club during their inaugural 2017 season in League 1, and helping the team to promotion, after which he joined Workington Town.

=== Rochdale Hornets ===
Penkywicz joined the Rochdale Hornets for the 2020 season and was appointed captain by coach Matt Calland.

== International ==
In 2008, he was named in the Wales squad to face England at the Keepmoat Stadium prior to England's departure for the 2008 Rugby League World Cup.
