= 2017 League 1 =

- League: League 1
- Duration: 22 matches
- Teams: 16
- Highest attendance: 8,546 (Toronto v Doncaster; Super 8s round 7)
- Lowest attendance: 65 (Oxford v South Wales Ironmen; Shield round 4)

2017 Season
- Champions: Toronto Wolfpack
- Runners-up: Barrow Raiders
- Biggest home win: 92–6 Keighley Cougars v Oxford; Regular season, round 15
- Biggest away win: 6–82 Doncaster v Toronto Wolfpack; Regular season, round 4
- Top point-scorer(s): Craig Hall (Toronto Wolfpack) 436
- Top try-scorer(s): Liam Kay (Toronto Wolfpack) 27

The 2017 League 1, known as the Kingstone Press League 1 for sponsorship reasons, was a professional rugby league football competition played in England, Wales and Canada, the third tier of the sport for RFL affiliated clubs.

The 2017 League 1 season was expanded to 16 teams with the first professional Canadian team Toronto Wolfpack joining the British game.

The fixture list was first issued in October 2016 when the inclusion of York City Knights in the league was in doubt so the Knights were omitted from the fixture list. York's inclusion in the league was confirmed at the beginning of December and the fixture list was re-issued to include the club.

The format of the season was a regular season of 15 games where every team played each other once. After 15 games the top eight teams played each other once more in the League 1 Super 8s. The team finishing top of the Super 8s won automatic promotion to the 2018 Championship and named league champions for 2017. The teams finishing second to fifth met in two play-off semi-finals with the semi-final winners meeting in the promotion play-off final.

The league title was won by Toronto who only dropped three points all season (a defeat to York and a draw with Keighley in the Super 8s) and had a 100% winning record at home. The other promotion place was taken by Barrow Raiders who defeated Cumbrian rivals, Whitehaven in the promotion play-off final.

The clubs finishing in the lower half of the table after the regular season played in the League 1 Shield Super 8s with the top two clubs competing in the League 1 Shield final. The shield was won by Hunslet.

== Teams ==
Locations of the 2017 RFL League 1 teams
Locations of the 2017 RFL League 1 teams

| Colors | Club | City | Stadium | Capacity* |
|---|---|---|---|---|
| | Barrow Raiders | Barrow, Cumbria | Craven Park | 7,600 |
| | Coventry Bears | Coventry, West Midlands | Butts Park Arena | 4,000 |
| | Doncaster | Doncaster, South Yorkshire | Keepmoat Stadium | 15,231 |
| | Gloucestershire All Golds | Cheltenham, Gloucestershire | Prince of Wales Stadium | 2,000 |
| | Hemel Stags | Hemel Hempstead, Hertfordshire | Pennine Way | 2,000 |
| | Hunslet | Leeds, West Yorkshire | South Leeds Stadium | 4,000 |
| | Keighley Cougars | Keighley, West Yorkshire | Cougar Park | 7,800 |
| | London Skolars | Haringey, London | New River Stadium | 2,000 |
| | Newcastle Thunder | Newcastle, Tyne and Wear | Kingston Park | 10,200 |
| | North Wales Crusaders | Wrexham, Wales | Queensway Stadium | 2,000 |
| | Oxford | Abingdon, Oxfordshire | Tilsley Park | 2,000 |
| | South Wales Ironmen | Merthyr Tydfil, Wales | The Wern | 4,500 to July 2017 |
| | South Wales Ironmen | Llanelli, Wales | Stebonheath Park | 3,700 from July 2017 |
| | Toronto Wolfpack | Toronto, Ontario, Canada | Lamport Stadium | 9,600 |
| | Whitehaven | Whitehaven, Cumbria | Recreation Ground | 7,500 |
| | Workington Town | Workington, Cumbria | Zebra Claims Stadium | 10,000 |
| | York City Knights | York, North Yorkshire | Bootham Crescent | 8,256 |

*capacity for rugby league games may differ from official stadium capacity.

== Regular season ==
The regular season was dominated by new club, Toronto, who won all 15 of its games, amassing over 900 points while only conceding 150. The Cumbrian clubs, Whitehaven and Barrow finished second and third respectively. Whitehaven put a run of 12 straight wins together while Barrow who had been second for a long time lost two games towards the end of the season. York whose existence was in doubt before the season started finished fourth with Doncaster and Newcastle behind them. The last two places in the Super 8s were contested right up until the last fixture of the season with five clubs; Workington, Keighley, North Wales Crusaders, Hunslet and London Skolars all in contention. In the end the places were taken by Keighley and Workington while North Wales lost out on points difference.

=== Final standings ===
| Pos | Team | Pld | W | D | L | PF | PA | PD | Pts | Qualification |
|---|---|---|---|---|---|---|---|---|---|---|
| 1 | Toronto Wolfpack | 15 | 15 | 0 | 0 | 916 | 157 | +759 | 30 | League 1 Super 8s |
| 2 | Whitehaven | 15 | 13 | 1 | 1 | 469 | 236 | +233 | 27 | League 1 Super 8s |
| 3 | Barrow Raiders | 15 | 12 | 1 | 2 | 576 | 264 | +312 | 25 | League 1 Super 8s |
| 4 | York City Knights | 15 | 10 | 0 | 5 | 487 | 305 | +182 | 20 | League 1 Super 8s |
| 5 | Doncaster | 15 | 9 | 2 | 4 | 449 | 327 | +122 | 20 | League 1 Super 8s |
| 6 | Newcastle Thunder | 15 | 9 | 0 | 6 | 459 | 328 | +131 | 18 | League 1 Super 8s |
| 7 | Keighley Cougars | 15 | 7 | 1 | 7 | 590 | 387 | +203 | 15 | League 1 Super 8s |
| 8 | Workington Town | 15 | 7 | 1 | 7 | 436 | 370 | +66 | 15 | League 1 Super 8s |
| 9 | North Wales Crusaders | 15 | 7 | 1 | 7 | 366 | 422 | −56 | 15 | League 1 Shield |
| 10 | Hunslet | 15 | 7 | 0 | 8 | 418 | 377 | +41 | 14 | League 1 Shield |
| 11 | London Skolars | 15 | 6 | 1 | 8 | 367 | 453 | −86 | 13 | League 1 Shield |
| 12 | Gloucestershire All Golds | 15 | 6 | 0 | 9 | 310 | 530 | −220 | 12 | League 1 Shield |
| 13 | Oxford | 15 | 4 | 0 | 11 | 275 | 629 | −354 | 8 | League 1 Shield |
| 14 | Coventry Bears | 15 | 2 | 0 | 13 | 287 | 615 | −328 | 4 | League 1 Shield |
| 15 | South Wales Ironmen | 15 | 1 | 0 | 14 | 212 | 654 | −442 | 2 | League 1 Shield |
| 16 | Hemel Stags | 15 | 1 | 0 | 14 | 229 | 792 | −563 | 2 | League 1 Shield |

== Super 8s ==
The top eight teams after the regular season went forward to the Super 8s. Points gained in the regular season were carried forward to the Super 8s during which the clubs played each other once more. The top four clubs at entry to the Super 8s played four home fixtures and three away while the bottom four clubs had three home fixtures and four away.

After all seven rounds had been played, Toronto Wolfpack were named League Champions and were automatically promoted to the Championship for 2018. Barrow Raiders, Whitehaven, York City Knights and Newcastle Thunder made the play off semi-finals. Toronto secured the automatic promotion place after round six despite having suffered their first ever league defeat in round two at York and also dropping a point at Keighley in round three. Barrow and Whitehaven met in an all-Cumbrian play-off final with Barrow winning 10–6 to secure promotion to the Championship for 2018.

=== Final standings ===
| Pos | Team | Pld | W | D | L | PF | PA | PD | Pts | Promotion or qualification |
|---|---|---|---|---|---|---|---|---|---|---|
| 1 | Toronto Wolfpack | 22 | 20 | 1 | 1 | 1164 | 243 | +921 | 41 | Promoted as Champions |
| 2 | Barrow Raiders | 22 | 18 | 1 | 3 | 731 | 381 | +350 | 37 | Play-off semi-finals |
| 3 | Whitehaven | 22 | 17 | 1 | 4 | 656 | 349 | +307 | 35 | Play-off semi-finals |
| 4 | York City Knights | 22 | 12 | 1 | 9 | 641 | 460 | +181 | 25 | Play-off semi-finals |
| 5 | Newcastle Thunder | 22 | 12 | 0 | 10 | 595 | 521 | +74 | 24 | Play-off semi-finals |
| 6 | Doncaster | 22 | 10 | 3 | 9 | 593 | 492 | +101 | 23 | Eliminated |
| 7 | Keighley Cougars | 22 | 10 | 2 | 10 | 728 | 565 | +163 | 22 | Eliminated |
| 8 | Workington Town | 22 | 9 | 1 | 12 | 532 | 621 | −89 | 19 | Eliminated |

=== Play-offs ===
Semi-finals

| Home | Score | Away | Match Information |
| Home | Score | Away | Date and Time | Venue | Referee | Attendance |
|---|---|---|---|---|---|---|
| Barrow Raiders | 60–0 | Newcastle Thunder | 24 September, 15:00 | Craven Park | G Dolan | 1,090 |
| Whitehaven | 21–20 (Note: After extra time) | York City Knights | 24 September, 15:00 | Recreation Ground | J McMullen | 853 |

Final

| Home | Score | Away | Match Information |
| Home | Score | Away | Date and Time | Venue | Referee | Attendance |
|---|---|---|---|---|---|---|
| Barrow Raiders | 10–6 | Whitehaven | 1 October, 15:00 | Craven Park | S Mikalauskas | 3,128 |

== League 1 Shield ==
The teams finishing in the bottom eight at the end of the regular season competed for the League 1 Shield. Points gained in the regular season were carried forward to the Shield competition. The teams played each other once more and after the completion of the seven rounds the top two teams played for the League 1 Shield. The final was contested by Hunslet and London Skolars after both teams won six of their seven games in the qualifying section. Hunlset won the trophy beating London 32–12 in the final.

=== Final standings ===
| Pos | Team | Pld | W | D | L | PF | PA | PD | Pts | Qualification |
|---|---|---|---|---|---|---|---|---|---|---|
| 1 | Hunslet | 22 | 13 | 0 | 9 | 696 | 470 | +226 | 26 | League 1 Shield final |
| 2 | London Skolars | 22 | 12 | 1 | 9 | 625 | 529 | +96 | 25 | League 1 Shield final |
| 3 | North Wales Crusaders | 22 | 11 | 1 | 10 | 556 | 574 | −18 | 23 | |
| 4 | Gloucestershire All Golds | 22 | 9 | 0 | 13 | 478 | 702 | −224 | 18 | |
| 5 | Oxford | 22 | 6 | 1 | 15 | 393 | 849 | −456 | 13 | |
| 6 | Coventry Bears | 22 | 5 | 0 | 17 | 472 | 837 | −365 | 10 | |
| 7 | Hemel Stags | 22 | 3 | 0 | 19 | 393 | 1033 | −640 | 6 | |
| 8 | South Wales Ironmen | 22 | 2 | 1 | 19 | 299 | 926 | −627 | 5 | |

=== Final ===
| Home | Score | Away | Match Information |
| Home | Score | Away | Date and Time | Venue | Referee | Attendance |
|---|---|---|---|---|---|---|
| Hunslet | 32–12 | London Skolars | 24 September, 15:00 | South Leeds Stadium | N Bennett | 516 |

== Awards ==
At the Kingstone Press Championship & League 1 awards, Toronto captain Craig Hall was named League 1 player of the year with the young player award going to Lewis Young of Newcastle Thunder while Carl Forster of Whitehaven was named coach of the year. Hall was also the league's top goal kicker and points scorer kicking 170 goals and scoring 24 tries for a total of 436 points. His Toronto teammate, Liam Kay was the top try scorer with 27.
