= Daniel Fleming (rugby league) =

Wales international rugby league footballer

Dan Fleming
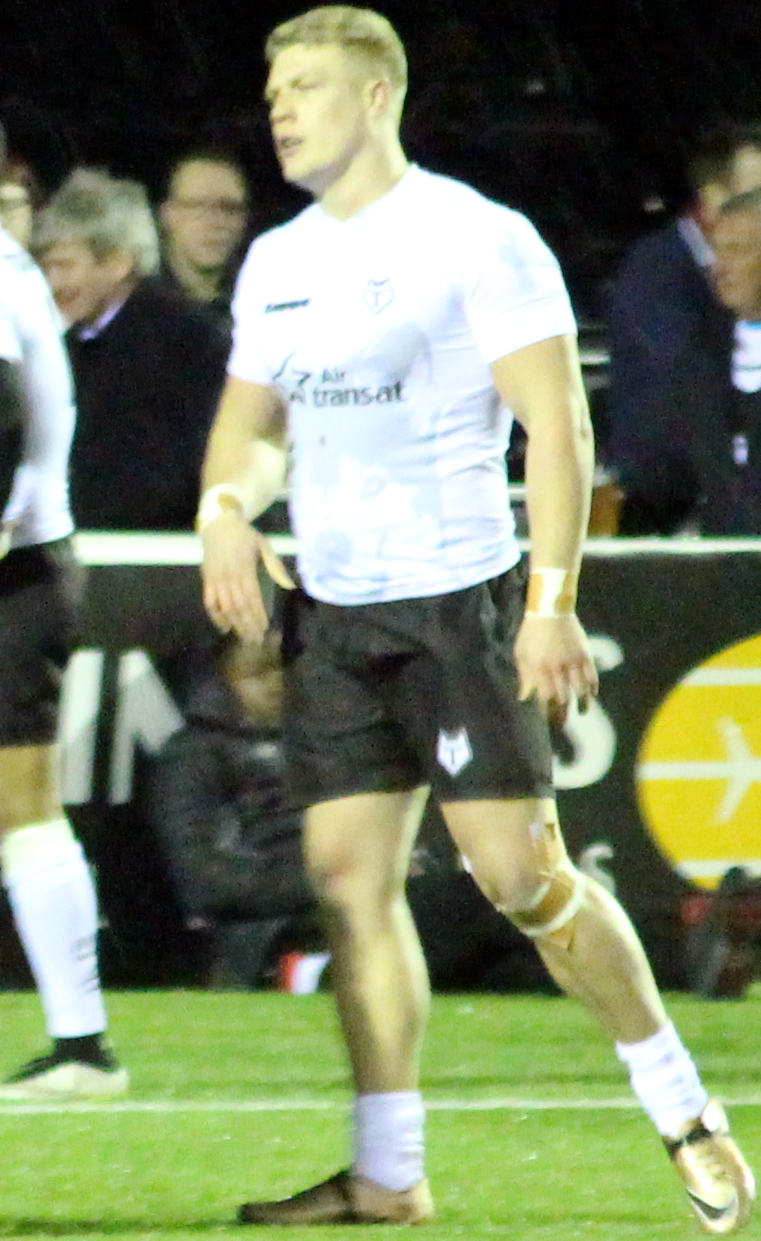

Personal information
- Full name: Daniel Fleming
- Born: 8 July 1992 (age 33) Halifax, West Yorkshire, England
- Height: 6 ft 3 in (1.90 m)
- Weight: 16 st 10 lb (106 kg)

Playing information

Rugby league
- Position: Prop
Club
Years	Team	Pld	T	G	FG	P
2010–12	Rochdale Hornets	1	0	0	0	0
2013	Batley Bulldogs	11	3	0	0	12
2013–14	Castleford Tigers	16	1	0	0	4
2014(loan)	→ York City Knights	1	0	0	0	0
2015–16	Bradford Bulls	21	0	0	0	0
2015(loan)	→ Oxford	1	0	0	0	0
2016(loan)	→ Swinton Lions	10	1	0	0	4
2017	Toronto Wolfpack	15	1	0	0	4
2018–20	Halifax Panthers	20	3	0	0	12
2020	Castleford Tigers	1	0	0	0	0
2021–22	Bradford Bulls	23	1	0	0	4
2022–23	Featherstone Rovers	5	0	0	0	0
2023(loan)	→ Halifax Panthers	8	1	0	0	4
	Total	133	11	0	0	44
Representative
Years	Team	Pld	T	G	FG	P
2012–22	Wales	12	2	0	0	8

Rugby union
- Position: Backrow
Club
Years	Team	Pld	T	G	FG	P
2023–	Heath RUFC	10	0	0	0	0
- Source: As of 20 April 2023

Daniel Fleming (born 8 July 1992) is a former Wales international rugby league footballer who currently plays for Heath RUFC.

He previously played for the Castleford Tigers in the Super League, the Bradford Bulls in the Championship and the Toronto Wolfpack in League 1.

== Background ==
Fleming was born in Halifax, West Yorkshire, England. He went to Sowerby Bridge High School and he now owns his own business, G's Cakes. He has 2 sons George and Henry.

== Playing career ==
Fleming made his Super League début for Castleford against London Broncos in 2013.

In June 2014, Fleming signed for Bradford Bulls on a two-year deal.

=== 2015 ===
He featured between round 4 and round 12 and then between round 19 and round 21. Fleming also played in round 23 against Halifax. Fleming played in qualifier 7 against Halifax. He featured in the Challenge Cup in round 5 against Hull Kingston Rovers.

=== 2016 ===
Fleming featured in the pre-season friendlies against Leeds and Castleford. He featured between round 7 and round 11. Fleming later joined Swinton Lions on loan for the remainder of the season.

In August 2016 it was announced that Fleming would be joining Toronto Wolfpack for their inaugural season in 2017.

=== 2023 ===
Fleming announced his retirement from rugby league at the end of the 2023 season. He began playing rugby union at Heath RUFC.

== International career ==
Fleming is a Wales international, having made his début against France in 2012. He was named in the Wales squad for the 2013 Rugby League World Cup but did not feature in the tournament.

He played in the 2014 European Cup.

He was selected in the Wales 9s squad for the 2019 Rugby League World Cup 9s.
