= Craig Hall (rugby league, born 1988) =

English rugby league footballer

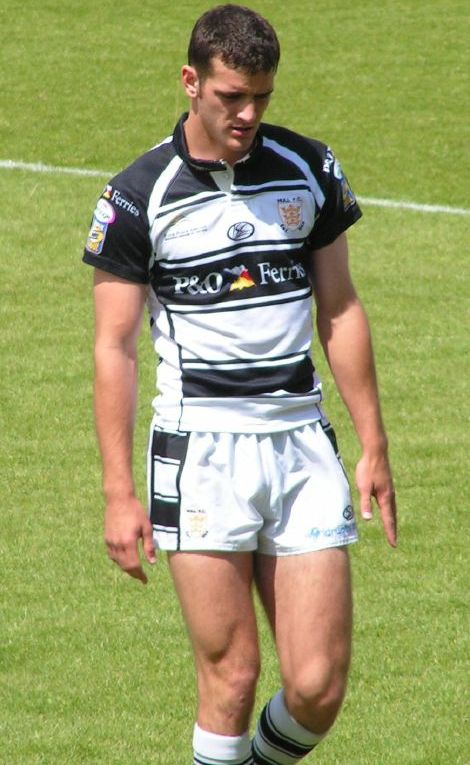

Personal information
- Full name: Craig David Hall
- Born: 21 February 1988 (age 38) Kingston upon Hull, Humberside, England
- Height: 6 ft 4 in (193 cm)
- Weight: 14 st 11 lb (94 kg)

Playing information
- Position: Wing, Centre, Fullback, Stand-off
Club
Years	Team	Pld	T	G	FG	P
2007–10	Hull F.C.	75	47	32	0	252
2009(loan)	→ Widnes Vikings	5	1	31	1	67
2011–14	Hull Kingston Rovers	80	42	41	2	252
2015–16	Wakefield Trinity Wildcats	40	17	41	0	150
2017	Toronto Wolfpack	25	25	171	0	442
2018	Leigh Centurions	20	21	11	0	106
2018(loan)	→ Hull Kingston Rovers	8	14	17	0	90
2019	Hull Kingston Rovers	30	12	23	0	98
2020–23	Featherstone Rovers	77	61	328	1	901
2024–25	Doncaster	48	9	22	3	83
	Total	408	249	717	7	2441
- Source: As of 31 August 2026

Craig David Hall (born 21 February 1988) is an English professional rugby league footballer who last played as a back for Doncaster RLFC in the Championship.

He played for Hull F.C. in the Super League, and on loan from Hull F.C. at the Widnes Vikings in the Championship.

He then played for Hull Kingston Rovers and the Wakefield Trinity Wildcats in the Super League, before moving to the play for the Toronto Wolfpack in Kingstone Press League 1.

He moved to the Leigh Centurions in the Championship, before moving from Leigh to Hull KR on loan ahead of a permanent return to Craven Park.

Hall agreed to play for Featherstone Rovers in the Championship, on loan from Hull Kingston Rovers, before making the deal permanent.

== Background ==
Hall was born in Kingston upon Hull, Humberside, England. He is the son of the rugby league footballer; David Hall. He is a product of the Hull F.C. Academy System.

== Playing career ==
=== Hull F.C. (2007-10) ===
Hall broke into the Hull F.C. first-team in 2007, after progressing through Hull F.C.'s Academy. He remained at the club until 2010. He later joined cross-city rivals Hull Kingston Rovers.

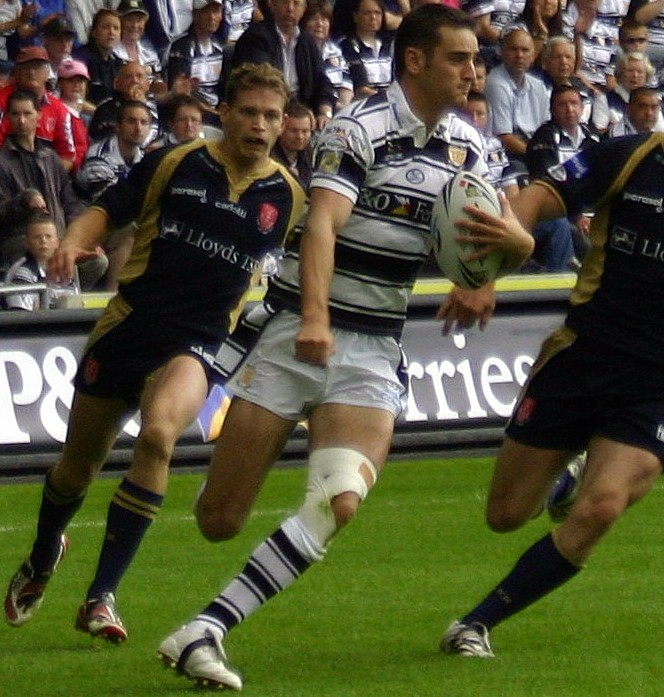
Hall in action for Hull F.C. during his time at the club

=== Widnes Vikings (2009) ===
Hall had a short loan-spell at the Widnes Vikings during the 2009 season.

=== Hull Kingston Rovers (2011-14) ===
Hall played for four seasons at Hull Kingston Rovers during 2011–14. (His first-spell at the club).

=== Wakefield Trinity (2015-16) ===
After leaving Hull Kingston Rovers, Hall moved to the Wakefield Trinity ahead of the 2015 Super League season. Hall spent two-years with the West Yorkshire club, before signing with the Toronto Wolfpack.

=== Toronto Wolfpack (2017) ===
In July 2016, Hall, along with Liam Kay, was announced as the first signings for the rugby league franchise the Toronto Wolfpack. He was later named as the team's inaugural captain for their debut campaign, for the 2017 League 1 season.

=== Leigh Centurions (2018) ===
Hall signed a two-year deal with Leigh in November 2017. But his stay at the Leigh was cut short in July 2018, due to the club facing financial difficulties and choosing to reduce their salary cap by moving a whole host of players to different clubs with Hall linking back-up with one of his former clubs in Hull Kingston Rovers, on a loan-deal agreement until the end of the 2018 season.

=== Hull Kingston Rovers (2018 – 2019) ===
It was revealed on 26 July 2018, that Hall would be returning to Hull Kingston Rovers for the remainder of the 2018 season, on a loan basis from Leigh. The loan-deal which involved Hall moving to the east Hull club, also saw his fellow Leigh teammate Ben Crooks come over with him in the same move. After a four-year exodus from the east Hull outfit, Hall would be embarking on his second-spell with one of his home town clubs. On 27 July 2018, just a day after joining Hull Kingston Rovers, Hall made his second début for the club on a rain-swept evening against Hull F.C., in the final round of the regular Super League season. Hall marked his return to Hull Kingston Rovers by scoring two tries and kicking a goal in the 'Hull Derby.' In which Hull Kingston Rovers claimed a thrilling 16–20 victory over their cross-city rivals. Hall picked up the Sky Sports' 'Man-of-the-Match' Award for his brilliant effort at the KCOM Stadium. It was revealed on 10 October 2018, that Hall would be staying at Hull Kingston Rovers following a short loan-spell from Leigh, after signing a new one-year contract.

=== Featherstone Rovers ===
Hall played for Featherstone in their 2021 Million Pound Game defeat against Toulouse Olympique. On 28 May 2022, Hall played for Featherstone in their 2022 RFL 1895 Cup final loss against Leigh.

=== Doncaster R.L.F.C. ===
On 20 October 2023, it was announced that Hall had signed a two-year deal with Doncaster R.L.F.C.

On 28 September 2025 it was reported that he would leave Doncaster RLFC at the end of the 2025 season

=== Career Awards and Accolades ===
==== Toronto Wolfpack ====
- 2017: Toronto Wolfpack – 'Player of the Year Award'

==== Hull Kingston Rovers ====
- 2018: Hull Kingston Rovers – 'Try of the Season Award'

==== Featherstone Rovers ====
- 2023: Featherstone Rovers – 'Craig Hall Testimonial'
