= Rhys Jacks =

Canada international rugby league footballer

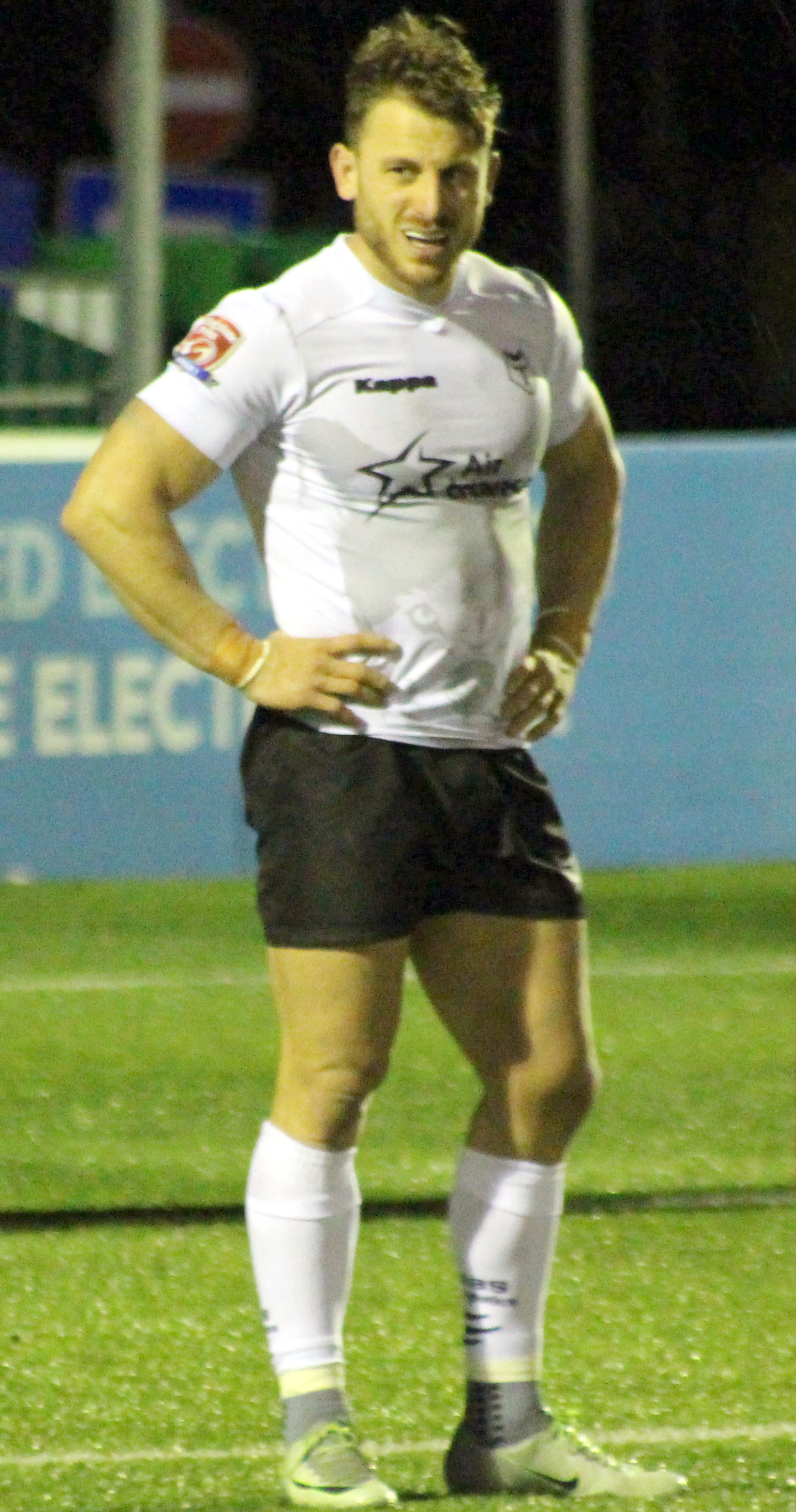

Personal information
- Born: 21 January 1990 (age 36) Brisbane, Queensland, Australia
- Height: 5 ft 9 in (175 cm)
- Weight: 13 st 10 lb (87 kg)

Playing information
- Position: Scrum-half, Hooker
Club
Years	Team	Pld	T	G	FG	P
2014–15	Souths Logan Magpies	33	6	0	0	24
2016	Sheffield Eagles	15	2	0	0	8
2017	Toronto Wolfpack	22	6	0	0	24
2018	Sunshine Coast Falcons	17	0	0	0	0
2019	Easts Tigers	0	0	0	0	0
	Total	87	14	0	0	56
Representative
Years	Team	Pld	T	G	FG	P
2015–25	Canada	5	1	0	0	4
- Source: As of 25 April 2026
- Relatives: Ryley Jacks (brother)

Rhys Jacks (born 21 January 1990) is a Canada international rugby league footballer who plays as a halfback for the Ipswich Jets in the Queensland Cup.

He previously played for the Sheffield Eagles in the Kingstone Press Championship in 2016, and for the Toronto Wolfpack during their inaugural season in 2017. Jacks represented the Canadian national team. He plays as a scrum-half and can also operate as a hooker.

== Background ==
Jacks was born in Brisbane, Queensland, Australia. As he is of Canadian descent, with his grandfather being born in Toronto, he is currently eligible for a Canadian passport; prior to the passage of Bill C-3 on December 15, 2025, citizenship was limited to only the first-generation born outside of Canada.

== Career ==
Jacks has played for the Souths Logan Magpies in the Queensland Cup and was previously in the system of the Easts Tigers.

Jacks is a Canadian international. His brother Ryley Jacks is a fellow representative for Canada.

Jacks joined the Toronto Wolfpack in 2017. Later that year, in October, he was named as one of five players to leave the Wolfpack before the 2018 season. He was released to make room for other international players; per Rugby Football League (RFL) rules a club may not have more than five overseas quota players—those from outside the United Kingdom and the European Union, and in the Wolfpack's case also Canada, the United States and Jamaica—as he did not hold Canadian citizenship at the time.

Upon return to his native Australia for the 2018 season, Jacks signed with the Sunshine Coast Falcons. Jacks returned to his initial rugby league organization of the Easts Tigers for the 2019 season.

He captained Canada in their 34-12 defeat to Jamaica on 22 November 2025 in Kingston, Jamaica.
