= Quentin Laulu-Togaga'e =

Samoa international rugby league footballer

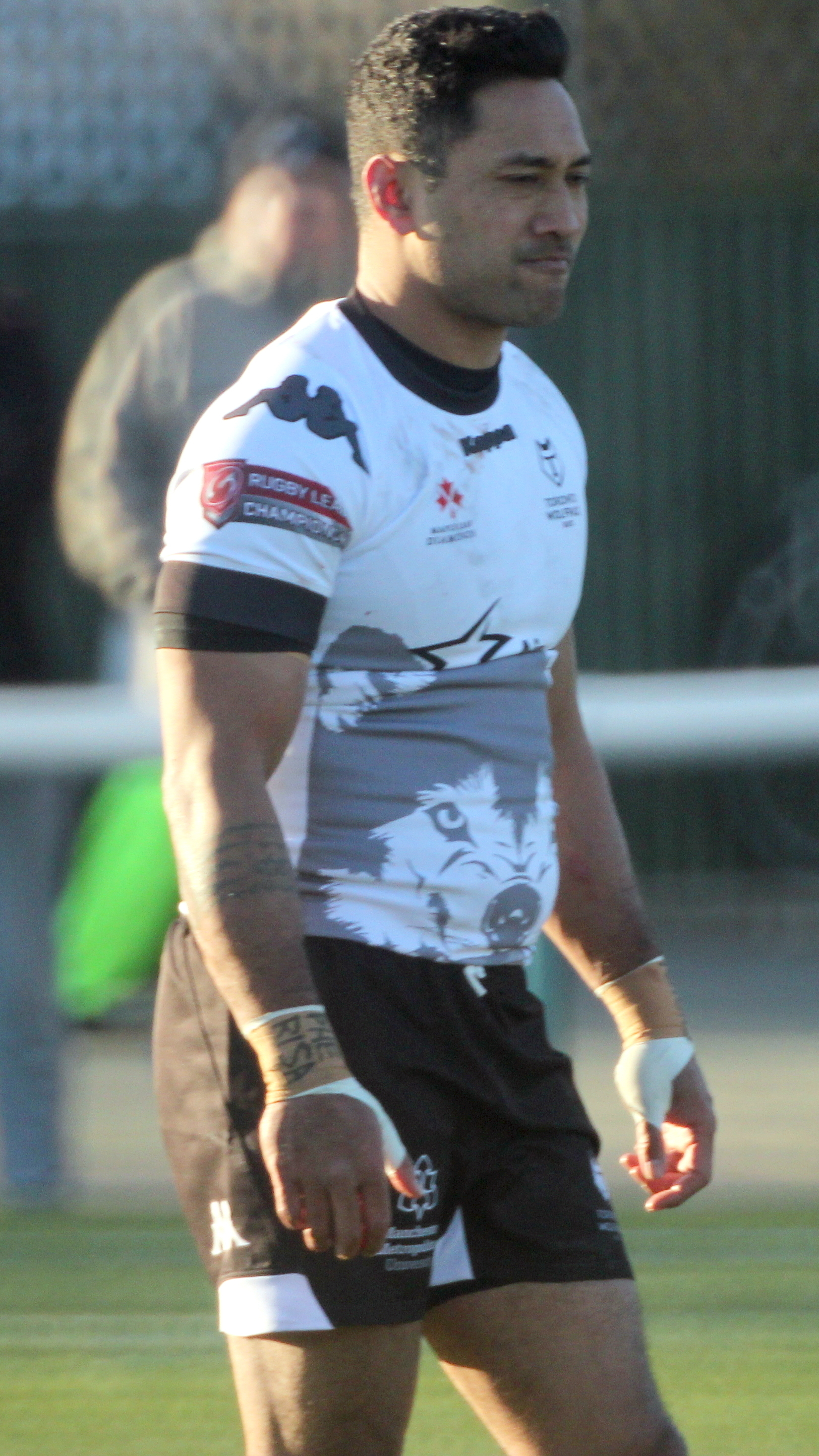

Personal information
- Full name: Quentin Laulu-Togaga'e
- Born: 1 December 1984 (age 40); Auckland, New Zealand
- Height: 178 cm (5 ft 10 in)
- Weight: 86 kg (13 st 8 lb)

Playing information
- Position: Fullback
Club
Years	Team	Pld	T	G	FG	P
2011–16	Sheffield Eagles	188	164	0	0	656
2017–18	Toronto Wolfpack	31	22	0	0	88
2018	Halifax	4	4	0	0	16
2018	Castleford Tigers	9	6	0	0	24
2019	Halifax	21	9	0	0	36
2019–20	Newcastle Thunder	14	7	0	0	28
2021–22	Keighley Cougars	12	7	0	0	28
2022(loan)	→ Sheffield Eagles	19	10	0	0	40
2023	Sheffield Eagles	21	7	0	0	28
	Total	319	236	0	0	944
Representative
Years	Team	Pld	T	G	FG	P
2010	Samoa	2	1	0	0	4
- Source: As of 3 January 2023
- Relatives: Phoenix Laulu-Togaga'e (son)

Quentin Laulu-Togaga'e (born 1 December 1984) is a Samoa international former rugby league footballer who last played as a fullback for the Sheffield Eagles in RFL Championship.

Laulu-Togaga'e previously played for the Sheffield Eagles, Toronto Wolfpack, a short spell at Halifax in the Championship and the Castleford Tigers in the Super League.

== Background ==
Laulu-Togaga'e was born in Auckland, New Zealand.

== Playing career ==
While playing for the Souths Logan Magpies in the Queensland Cup, QLT was selected to represent Samoa in two international matches in October 2010, against New Zealand and Tonga, scoring a try against the latter.

In 2012, QLT scored 35 tries for Sheffield, which was an all time season record for the club. Q was also named in the Championship team of the year at full back, and scored a try in Sheffield's 20–16 victory over Featherstone Rovers in the Championship Grand Final. The following year, he scored another 35 tries for Sheffield, and was again named in the team of the season. He also scored a try in Sheffield's 19–12 win over Batley in the Championship Grand Final.

In November 2016, QLT signed with the Toronto Wolfpack for their inaugural season in League 1.

On 1 January 2024, it was reported that he had suffered a heart attack whilst training.
