= Blake Wallace =

Australian rugby league footballer

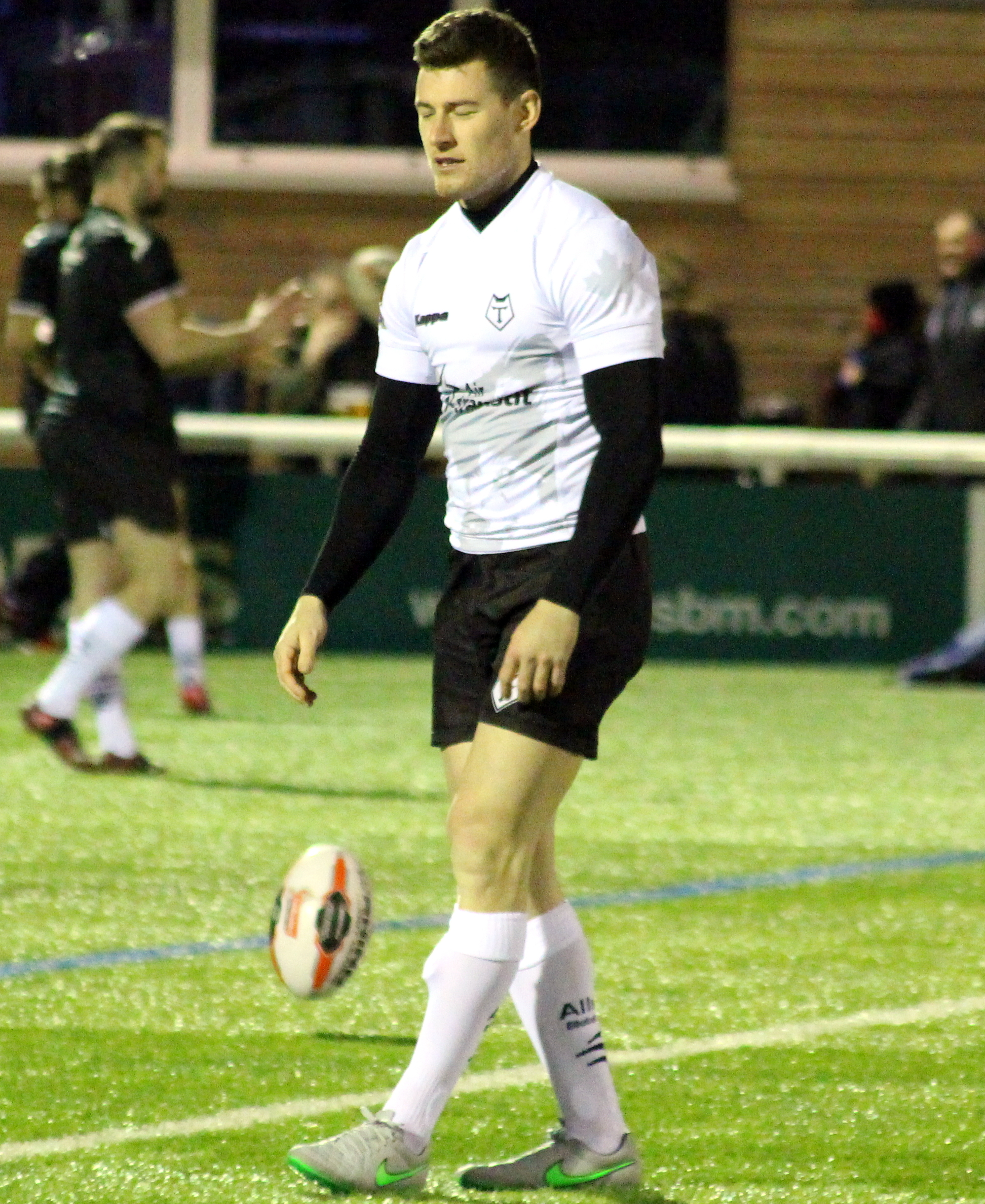

Personal information
- Born: 18 June 1992 (age 32); Wollongong, New South Wales, Australia
- Height: 5 ft 11 in (1.80 m)
- Weight: 13 st 12 lb (88 kg)

Playing information
- Position: Stand-off, Scrum-half
Club
Years	Team	Pld	T	G	FG	P
2017–20	Toronto Wolfpack	75	50	42	0	284
2021	Leigh Centurions	3	0	0	0	0
	Total	78	50	42	0	284
- Source: As of 15 April 2021

Blake Wallace (born 18 June 1992) is a retired Australian professional rugby league footballer who played as a stand-off or scrum-half for the Leigh Centurions in the Super League.

He previously played for the Toronto Wolfpack in League 1, Championship and the Super League.

== Background ==
Wallace was born in Wollongong, New South Wales, Australia.

He played his junior rugby league for the Dapto Canaries.

== Playing career ==
=== Central Queensland Capras ===
Wallace played for the Central Queensland Capras in the Queensland Cup.

=== Illawarra Cutters ===
He also played for the Illawarra Cutters in the NSW Cup.

=== Toronto Wolfpack ===
He made his professional debut for the Toronto Wolfpack in the Challenge Cup in 2017.

Wallace played in both 2018 RFL Championship and 2019 RFL Championship.

=== Leigh Centurions ===
When the Toronto club folded in mid-2020 (primarily due to the disruption caused to fixtures and attendance by the COVID-19 pandemic), Wallace was signed up by the Leigh Centurions. He only played three games with Leigh Centurions before suffering a concussion that forced him to be medically retired.

== Post-playing career ==
=== Dapto Canaries ===
In late 2022 he took up the role of head-coach of Dapto Canaries.
