= Jonny Pownall =

English rugby league footballer

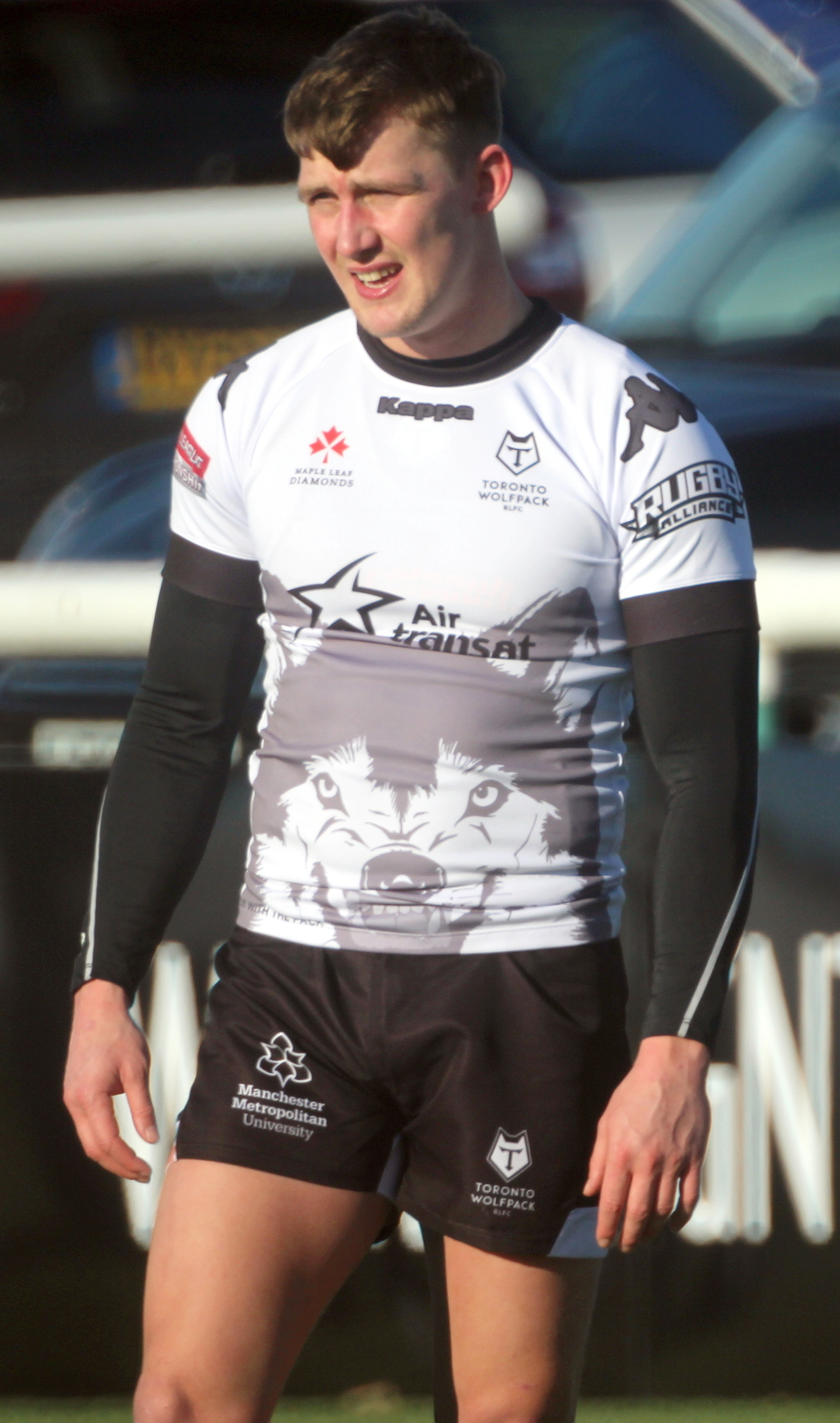

Personal information
- Full name: Jonathan Pownall
- Born: 22 August 1991 (age 34); England
- Height: 5 ft 11 in (1.80 m)
- Weight: 13 st 5 lb (85 kg)

Playing information
- Position: Wing
Club
Years	Team	Pld	T	G	FG	P
2011–16	Leigh Centurions	92	58	0	0	232
2017–18	Toronto Wolfpack	32	31	0	0	124
2018(loan)	→ Barrow Raiders	5	0	0	0	0
2018(loan)	→ Bradford Bulls	5	3	0	0	12
2019	Leigh Centurions	12	7	0	0	28
	Total	146	99	0	0	396
- Source: As of 19 October 2019 (UTC)

Jonathan Pownall (born 22 August 1991) is an English former professional rugby league footballer who last played as a winger for the Leigh Centurions in the Championship.

He previously played for the Leigh Centurions and Toronto Wolfpack.

== Career ==
Pownall made his senior début for Leigh on 6 March 2011 in a Challenge Cup match against the amateur club Hull Dockers. His first league game was on 22 May 2011 in a Championship match against Hunslet Hawks.

In 2016, it was announced that Pownall would join Toronto Wolfpack for the 2017 season. He made his début in the 3rd round of the 2017 Challenge Cup.
