= Greg Worthington =

English rugby league footballer

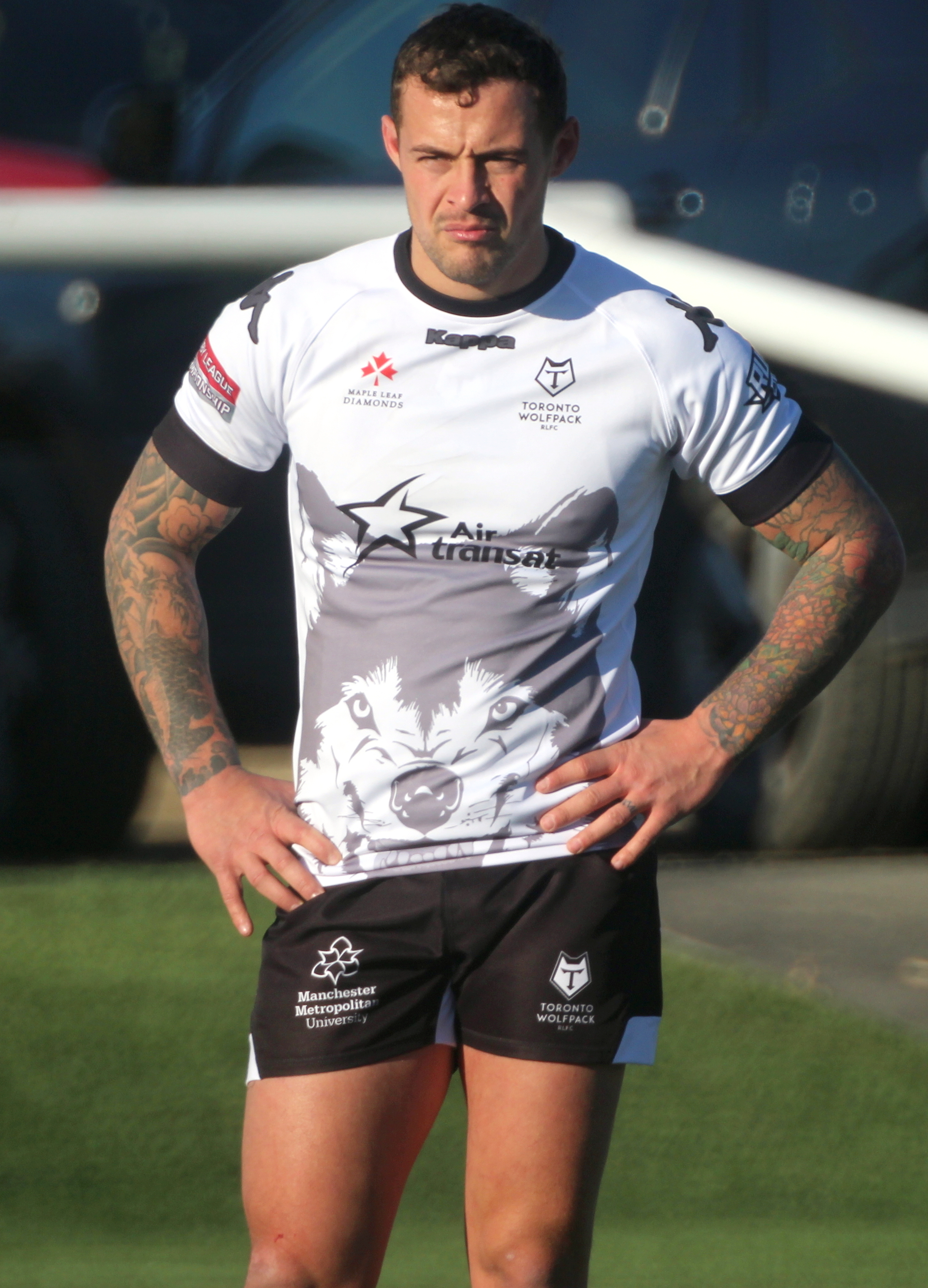

Personal information
- Full name: Gregory Worthington
- Born: 17 July 1990 (age 35) Queensbury, West Yorkshire, England
- Height: 6 ft 0 in (1.84 m)
- Weight: 15 st 6 lb (98 kg)

Playing information
- Position: Centre
Club
Years	Team	Pld	T	G	FG	P
2011–14	Featherstone Rovers	103	56	0	0	216
2015–16	Leigh Centurions	42	17	0	0	68
2017–20	Toronto Wolfpack	43	19	0	0	68
2020(loan)	→ Featherstone Rovers	4	5	0	0	8
2020(loan)	→ Halifax Panthers	1	0	0	0	0
2021–22	Halifax Panthers	43	2	0	0	4
2023	Barrow Raiders	22	1	0	0	4
	Total	258	100	0	0	368
- Source: As of 7 June 2025

Greg Worthington (born 17 July 1990) is a professional rugby league footballer who last played as a centre for Barrow Raiders in the Championship.

He previously played for the Leigh Centurions, Toronto Wolfpack and Halifax Panthers in the Championship.

== Background ==
Worthington was born in Queensbury, West Yorkshire, England.

== Club career ==
=== Huddersfield Giants ===
Worthington began his career at Queensbury ARLFC before joining Huddersfield, where he played in the academy team.

=== Featherstone Rovers ===
In 2011, Worthington joined Featherstone Rovers in the Championship where over four seasons with the club he made 101 appearances and scored 54 tries.

=== Leigh Centurions ===
In 2014, he joined Leigh Centurions, where he won the Championship title in 2015 and 2016 and helped the club gain promotion to Super League in the 2016 Super 8s.

=== Toronto Wolfpack ===
On 30 September 2016, it was announced that he would be joining Toronto Wolfpack for the club's inaugural season in 2017.

=== Halifax Panthers ===
On 24 August 2020, it was reported that Worthington would join Halifax for the 2021 season.

=== Barrow Raiders ===
On 6 October 2022, it was announced that he would join Barrow Raiders.

== Personal life ==
Worthington has completed a four-year apprenticeship as a welder. During his time playing for Halifax, Worthington was also the head coach of the first team at Queensbury ARLFC.

He is married with two children. In 2018, the couple had a son that died at birth due to a congenital heart defect. In 2021, with the support of Queensbury ARLFC, they raised around £10,000 for the Children's Heart Surgery Fund (CHSF).
