= Jacob Emmitt =

Wales international rugby league footballer

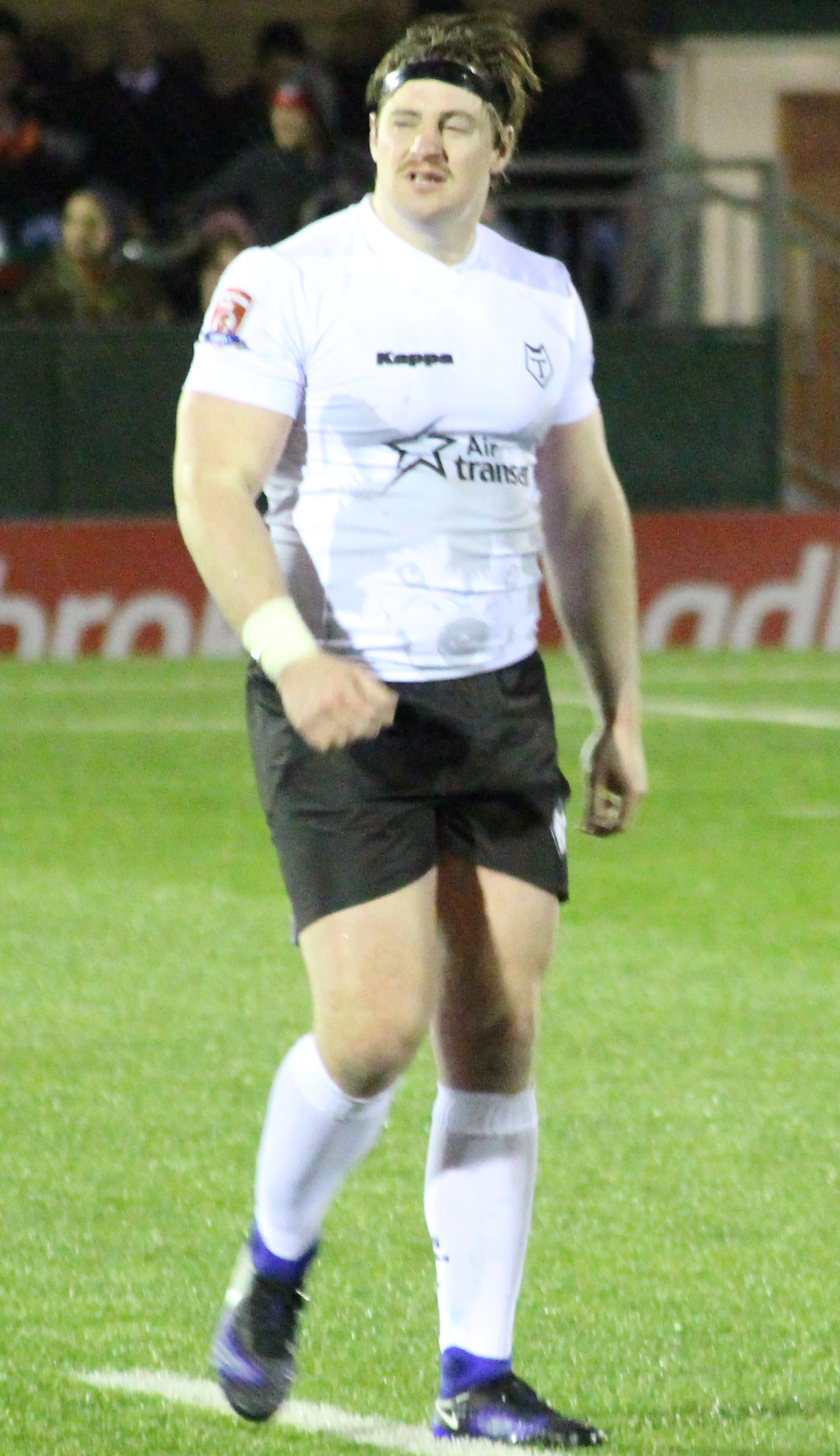

Personal information
- Full name: Jacob Emmitt
- Born: 4 October 1988 (age 37) Warrington, Cheshire, England
- Height: 6 ft 1 in (185 cm)
- Weight: 16 st 3 lb (103 kg)

Playing information

Rugby league
- Position: Prop, Loose forward, Second-row
Club
Years	Team	Pld	T	G	FG	P
2008–10	St Helens	19	1	0	0	4
2010(loan)	→ Leigh Centurions	13	8	0	0	32
2011–13	Castleford Tigers	52	0	0	0	0
2013(loan)	→ Keighley Cougars	3	0	0	0	0
2013	Salford Red Devils	17	1	0	0	4
2014–16	Leigh Centurions	76	7	1	0	30
2016	Swinton Lions	7	0	0	0	0
2017–19	Toronto Wolfpack	51	2	0	0	8
2019	Leigh Centurions	19	0	0	0	0
2019–20	AS Carcassonne	0	0	0	0	0
2021–	Barrow Raiders	2	0	0	0	0
	Total	259	19	1	0	78
Representative
Years	Team	Pld	T	G	FG	P
2010–16	Wales	6	0	0	0	0

Rugby union
Club
Years	Team	Pld	T	G	FG	P
2020–21	Lymm RFC	0	0	0	0	0
- Source: As of 4 August 2021

Jacob Emmitt (born 4 October 1988) is a Wales international rugby league footballer who plays as a prop for the Barrow Raiders in the RFL League 1.

He previously played for the Toronto Wolfpack, St Helens, Castleford Tigers, Leigh Centurions, Salford Red Devils and the Swinton Lions. He has also spent time on loan at the Leigh Centurions and the Keighley Cougars.

== Background ==
Emmitt was born in Warrington, Cheshire, England.

== Playing career ==
Emmitt began his career at St Helens. He joined Castleford on a 2-year deal on 16 September 2010. The following month he represented Wales in the Alitalia European Cup.

He signed an 18-month deal with Salford in April 2013, but left Salford and signed a contract to return to Leigh for the 2014 season.

In October and November 2013, He represented Wales in the 2013 Rugby League World Cup.

In October 2014, Emmitt played in the 2014 European Cup.

In October 2016, Emmit played in the 2017 World Cup qualifiers.

=== Lymm RFC ===
On 19 June 2020, it was announced that Emmitt would end his professional rugby league career and has joined Lymm RFC.

=== Barrow Raiders ===
On 3 August 2021, it was reported that he had signed for Barrow in the RFL League 1.
