= Liam Kay =

Ireland international rugby league footballer

Personal information
- Full name: Liam Thomas Kay
- Born: 17 December 1991 (age 34) Leeds, West Yorkshire, England

Playing information
- Height: 6 ft 1 in (1.85 m)
- Weight: 14 st 8 lb (93 kg)
- Position: Wing
Club
Years	Team	Pld	T	G	FG	P
2012–13	Wakefield Trinity Wildcats	5	7	0	0	28
2013(DR)	→ Doncaster	21	12	0	0	48
2014–16	Leigh Centurions	78	74	0	0	296
2017–20	Toronto Wolfpack	70	66	0	0	264
2020(loan)	→ Wakefield Trinity	3	2	0	0	8
2021–24	Wakefield Trinity	87	17	0	0	68
	Total	264	178	0	0	712
Representative
Years	Team	Pld	T	G	FG	P
2017–	Ireland	3	3	0	0	12

Liam Kay (born 17 December 1991) is a former Ireland international rugby league footballer.

He previously played for the Wakefield Trinity Wildcats in the Super League, and on loan from the Wildcats at Doncaster in the Kingstone Press Championship. Kay has also played for the Leigh Centurions in the Championship and the Toronto Wolfpack in the Championship and the Super League. He also spent time on loan from Toronto at Wakefield in the top flight.

Kay announced his retirement from the game following Wakefields promotion back to the Super League in 2024.

== Background ==
Kay was born in Leeds, West Yorkshire, England.

== Career ==
=== Wakefield ===
Kay signed a professional contract at Wakefield Trinity Wildcats in 2012 as a halfback but was mostly played on the wing. He scored 7 tries for the Wakefield Trinity Wildcats in 5 appearances. In 2013 he was sent on dual registration to Doncaster where he played at both halfback but mostly on the wing as he had done at Wakefield. He scored 12 tries in 21 appearances for Doncaster before he returned to Wakefield where a hat-trick of tries against Castleford Tigers in the closing game of the 2013 season.

=== Leigh ===
Kay signed for Championship side Leigh in 2014 where he played as a wing. In his first season with the club, they finished top of the league and won the Grand Final against Featherstone Rovers to win the Championship for the first time since 2004. In 2015 Kay equalled the record for most tries in a season by a Leigh wing which was 36 as the Leigh Centurions again won the Championship title.

=== Toronto ===
Kay was the first-ever signing to play for the newly formed Canadian club, Toronto Wolfpack, for their inaugural season in 2017. Kay ended that season as the division's top try scorer. He was also named in the Ireland squad for the 2017 Rugby League World Cup.

In 2018 again Toronto Wolfpack would finish top of the championship and would enter the playoffs for a chance for promotion.

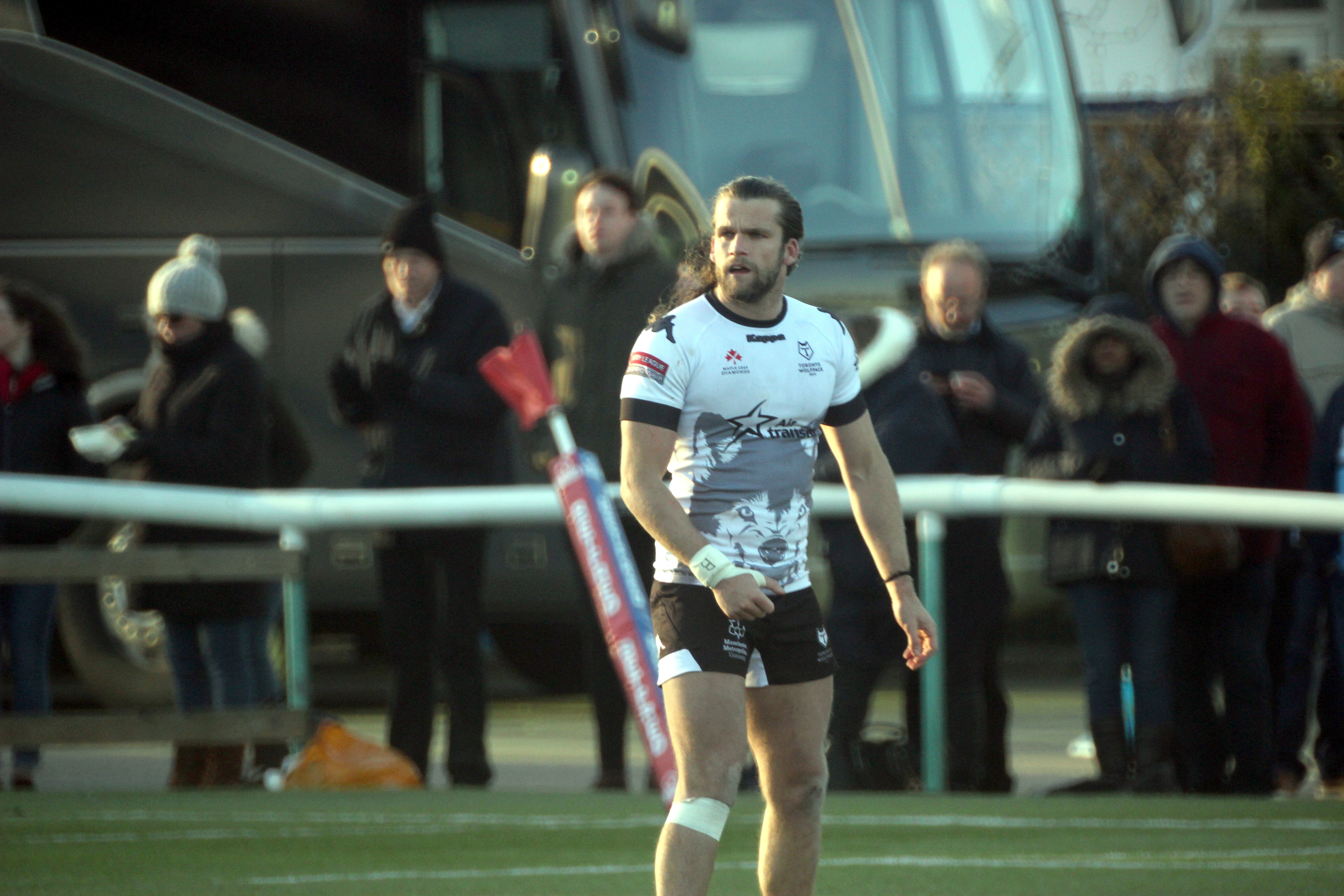
Kay playing for Toronto in 2018

Unfortunately Kay suffered an extremely complex injury in the first week of the play-offs, unfortunately that wasn't the first of the bad news for Toronto Wolfpack as they would later fail to reach the Super league losing to London Broncos In the Million Pound Game.

In 2019 Kay would miss the first few games due to the injury he sustained in August 2018. But he made his return on Canadian soil against Bradford Bulls. Again Toronto Wolfpack would finish top of the table and at last gain promotion to Super League with Kay firmly in the mix.

=== Wakefield (II) ===
On 16 July 2020, Kay was loaned to Wakefield Trinity from the Toronto Wolfpack for the remainder of the 2020 Super League season, while also signing a two-year deal with the Trinity for 2021 & 2022. Kay played 25 games for Wakefield Trinity in the Super League XXVIII season as the club finished bottom of the table and were relegated to the RFL Championship which ended their 24-year stay in the top flight.

== Honours ==
=== Leigh ===
- RFL Championship: (3) 2014, 2015, 2016

=== Toronto Wolfpack ===
RFL League 1: (1) 2017

- RFL Championship: (2) 2018, 2019

=== Wakefield Trinity ===
- RFL 1895 Cup: (1) 2024
- RFL Championship Leaders' Shield: 2024
