= 2025 RFL League One results =

Rugby league competition results

The fixture list for the 2025 RFL League One was issued on 26 November 2024. The regular season comprised 22 rounds. Each club had 20 fixtures with two bye weeks.

Cornwall withdrew from the league on 2 April. The results of the three matches they had played were expunged (Note: Expunged games are not counted for the competition but the appearances and points scored do still count for player's individual records) on 2 May.

All times are UK local time (UTC±00:00 until 30 March 2025, UTC+01:00 thereafter).

== Regular season ==
=== Round 1 ===
Betfred League One: round one
Home	Score	Away	Match Information
Home	Score	Away	Date and Time	Venue	Referee	Attendance
Dewsbury Rams	10–20	North Wales Crusaders	23 February 2025, 15:00	Crown Flatt	A. Belafonte
Goole Vikings	14–16	Midlands Hurricanes	23 February 2025, 15:00	Victoria Pleasure Grounds	T. Jones	479
Rochdale Hornets	44–0	Keighley Cougars	23 February 2025, 15:00	Spotland Stadium	A. Sweet	927
Swinton Lions	16–10	Whitehaven	23 February 2025, 15:00	Heywood Road	D. Arnold	742
Workington Town	C–C (Note: Match was originally Postponed due to waterlogged pitch. Cornwall's withdrawal from the league on 2 April led to the match's cancellation.)	Cornwall

=== Round 2 ===
Betfred League One: round two
Home	Score	Away	Match Information
Home	Score	Away	Date and Time	Venue	Referee	Attendance
Rochdale Hornets	68–0 (Note: Result expunged)	Cornwall	9 March 2025, 13:00	Spotland Stadium	S. Houghton	568
Midlands Hurricanes	16–16	Workington Town	9 March 2025, 14:00	Alexander Stadium	L.Bland	500
Goole Vikings	16–22	Dewsbury Rams	9 March 2025, 15:00	Victoria Pleasure Grounds	A. Williams	658
Whitehaven	20–4	Keighley Cougars	9 March 2025, 15:00	Recreation Ground	A. Sweet	811
Newcastle Thunder	6–48	Swinton Lions	9 March 2025, 17:00	Crow Trees Ground	C. Hughes

=== Round 3 ===
Betfred League One: round three
Home	Score	Away	Match Information
Home	Score	Away	Date and Time	Venue	Referee	Attendance
Cornwall	32–22	Newcastle Thunder	23 March 2025, 13:00	The Memorial Ground	A. Williams
Swinton Lions	10–26	Dewsbury Rams	23 March 2025, 14:00	Heywood Road	T. Jones	876
Goole Vikings	6–28	North Wales Crusaders	23 March 2025, 15:00	Victoria Pleasure Grounds	A. Sweet	447
Keighley Cougars	24–26	Midlands Hurricanes	23 March 2025, 15:00	Cougar Park	K. Moore	1,045
Whitehaven	24–20	Rochdale Hornets	23 March 2025, 15:00	Recreation Ground	A. Belafonte	859

=== Round 4 ===
Betfred League One: round four
Home	Score	Away	Match Information
Home	Score	Away	Date and Time	Venue	Referee	Attendance
Cornwall	6–78	Whitehaven	30 March 2025, 13:00	The Memorial Ground	D. Arnold
Dewsbury Rams	26–12	Keighley Cougars	30 March 2025, 15:00	Crown Flatt	A. Williams
Newcastle Thunder	6–54	Midlands Hurricanes	30 March 2025, 15:00	Crow Trees Ground	A. Sweet
Swinton Lions	30–28	Goole Vikings	30 March 2025, 15:00	Heywood Road	L. Bland	658
Workington Town	14–16	North Wales Crusaders	30 March 2025, 15:00	Derwent Park	T. Jones

=== Round 5 ===
Betfred League One: round five
Home	Score	Away	Match Information
Home	Score	Away	Date and Time	Venue	Referee	Attendance
Midlands Hurricanes	46–12	Dewsbury Rams	6 April 2025, 14:00	Alexander Stadium	T. Jones	250
Keighley Cougars	14–18	Swinton Lions	6 April 2025, 15:00	Cougar Park	A. Belefonte	1,263
Rochdale Hornets	24–34	Workington Town	6 April 2025, 15:00	Spotland Stadium	D. Arnold
Whitehaven	66–6	Newcastle Thunder	6 April 2025, 15:00	Recreation Ground	L. Bland	773

=== Round 6 ===
Betfred League One: round six
Home	Score	Away	Match Information
Home	Score	Away	Date and Time	Venue	Referee	Attendance
Dewsbury Rams	56–6	Newcastle Thunder	18 April 2025, 15:00	Crown Flatt	M. Mckelvey
Rochdale Hornets	8–7	Swinton Lions	18 April 2025, 15:00	Spotland Stadium	A. Sweet	1,137
Workington Town	10–8	Whitehaven	18 April 2025, 15:00	Derwent Park	A. Williams	2,310
Keighley Cougars	18–24	Goole Vikings	18 April 2025, 18:30	Cougar Park	C. Hughes	969
Midlands Hurricanes	18–31	North Wales Crusaders	19 April 2025, 14:00	Alexander Stadium	L. Bland	500

=== Round 7 ===
Betfred League One: round seven
Home	Score	Away	Match Information
Home	Score	Away	Date and Time	Venue	Referee	Attendance
North Wales Crusaders	42–12	Whitehaven	26 April 2025, 18:00	Eirias Stadium	A. Sweet	535
Dewsbury Rams	18–32	Rochdale Hornets	27 April 2025, 15:00	Crown Flatt	A. Williams
Newcastle Thunder	16–34	Goole Vikings	27 April 2025, 15:00	Crow Trees Ground	C. Hughes
Workington Town	32–12	Swinton Lions	27 April 2025, 15:00	Derwent Park	A. Belafonte	813

=== Round 8 ===
Betfred League One: round eight
Home	Score	Away	Match Information
Home	Score	Away	Date and Time	Venue	Referee	Attendance
Newcastle Thunder	0–62	Workington Town	2 May 2025, 20:00	Crow Trees Ground	T. Jones
Rochdale Hornets	50–6	Goole Vikings	3 May 2025, 15:00	Spotland Stadium	S. Mikalauskas	744
Swinton Lions	26–20	North Wales Crusaders	4 May 2025, 15:00	Heywood Road	A. Williams	801
Whitehaven	24–24	Dewsbury Rams	4 May 2025, 15:00	Recreation Ground	L. Bland	626

=== Round 9 ===
Betfred League One: round nine
Home	Score	Away	Match Information
Home	Score	Away	Date and Time	Venue	Referee	Attendance
Rochdale Hornets	10–22	Midlands Hurricanes	10 May 2025, 15:00	Spotland Stadium	L. Bland	772
Keighley Cougars	6–46	Workington Town	11 May 2025, 15:00	Cougar Park	D. Arnold	1,089
Whitehaven	42–24	Goole Vikings	11 May 2025, 15:00	Recreation Ground	A. Billington	667
North Wales Crusaders	74–0	Newcastle Thunder	18 May 2025, 14:30	Eirias Stadium	L. Bland	282

=== Round 10 ===
Betfred League One: round ten
Home	Score	Away	Match Information
Home	Score	Away	Date and Time	Venue	Referee	Attendance
Midlands Hurricanes	38–8	Whitehaven	25 May 2025, 14:00	Alexander Stadium	A. Belafonte	250
Keighley Cougars	6–30	North Wales Crusaders	25 May 2025, 15:00	Cougar Park	D. Arnold	767
Rochdale Hornets	70–6	Newcastle Thunder	25 May 2025, 15:00	Spotland Stadium	L. Bland	669
Workington Town	24–16	Goole Vikings	25 May 2025, 15:00	Derwent Park	A. Sweet

=== Round 11 ===
Betfred League One: round eleven
Home	Score	Away	Match Information
Home	Score	Away	Date and Time	Venue	Referee	Attendance
Midlands Hurricanes	38–26	Swinton Lions	1 June 2025, 14:00	Alexander Stadium	G. Poumes	623
North Wales Crusaders	32–12	Rochdale Hornets	1 June 2025, 14:30	Eirias Stadium	T. Jones
Newcastle Thunder	0–52	Keighley Cougars	1 June 2025, 15:00	Crow Trees Ground	A. Williams
Workington Town	12–20	Dewsbury Rams	1 June 2025, 15:00	Derwent Park	L. Bland

=== Round 12 ===
Betfred League One: round twelve
Home	Score	Away	Match Information
Home	Score	Away	Date and Time	Venue	Referee	Attendance
Dewsbury Rams	14–20	Goole Vikings	13 June 2025, 19:00	Crown Flatt	A. Williams
North Wales Crusaders	14–4	Midlands Hurricanes	15 June 2025, 14:30	Eirias Stadium	A. Belafonte	400
Keighley Cougars	26–25	Rochdale Hornets	15 June 2025, 15:00	Cougar Park	A. Sweet	1,828
Swinton Lions	24–14	Workington Town	15 June 2025, 15:00	Heywood Road	D. Arnold	949

=== Round 13 ===
Betfred League One: round thirteen
Home	Score	Away	Match Information
Home	Score	Away	Date and Time	Venue	Referee	Attendance
Midlands Hurricanes	12–13	Goole Vikings	22 June 2025, 14:00	Alexander Stadium	A. Sweet	920
Dewsbury Rams	28–14	Whitehaven	22 June 2025, 15:00	Crown Flatt	D. Arnold
Swinton Lions	30–22	Keighley Cougars	22 June 2025, 15:00	Heywood Road	L. Bland	842
Workington Town	56–0	Newcastle Thunder	22 June 2025, 15:00	Derwent Park	A. Williams

=== Round 14 ===
Betfred League One: round fourteen
Home	Score	Away	Match Information
Home	Score	Away	Date and Time	Venue	Referee	Attendance
Midlands Hurricanes	22–20	Rochdale Hornets	6 July 2025, 14:00	Alexander Stadium	A. Williams	463
North Wales Crusaders	56–22	Workington Town	6 July 2025, 14:30	Eirias Stadium	L. Bland
Keighley Cougars	22–16	Dewsbury Rams	6 July 2025, 15:00	Cougar Park	A. Sweet	1,503
Whitehaven	14–18	Swinton Lions	6 July 2025, 15:00	Recreation Ground	T. Jones

=== Round 15 ===
Betfred League One: round fifteen
Home	Score	Away	Match Information
Home	Score	Away	Date and Time	Venue	Referee	Attendance
North Wales Crusaders	20–6	Dewsbury Rams	13 July 2025, 14:30	Eirias Stadium	A. Williams
Goole Vikings	56–6	Whitehaven	13 July 2025, 15:00	Post Office Road, Featherstone (Note: Match played at Featherstone Rovers' due to pitch works at Victoria Pleasure Ground.)	L. Bland
Swinton Lions	52–10	Newcastle Thunder	13 July 2025, 15:00	Heywood Road	D. Arnold	725
Workington Town	29–12	Midlands Hurricanes	13 July 2025, 15:00	Derwent Park	A. Sweet

=== Round 16 ===
Betfred League One: round sixteen
Home	Score	Away	Match Information
Home	Score	Away	Date and Time	Venue	Referee	Attendance
Dewsbury Rams	26–6	Swinton Lions	20 July 2025, 15:00	Crown Flatt	K. Moore
Goole Vikings	26–12	Keighley Cougars	20 July 2025, 15:00	Post Office Road, Featherstone	L. Bland
Newcastle Thunder	0–60	Rochdale Hornets	20 July 2025, 15:00	Crow Trees Ground	D. Arnold
Whitehaven	8–22	Workington Town	20 July 2025, 15:00	Recreation Ground	A. Belafonte

=== Round 17 ===
Betfred League One: round seventeen
Home	Score	Away	Match Information
Home	Score	Away	Date and Time	Venue	Referee	Attendance
Swinton Lions	16–8	Midlands Hurricanes	27 July 2025, 14:00	Heywood Road	A. Belafonte (Note: Replaced by touch judge Oli Maddocks after 76 minutes.)	1,031
Goole Vikings	0–50	Rochdale Hornets	27 July 2025, 15:00	Victoria Pleasure Grounds	A. Williams	712
Keighley Cougars	26–14	Whitehaven	27 July 2025, 15:00	Cougar Park	D. Arnold	1,537
Newcastle Thunder	6–72	North Wales Crusaders	27 July 2025, 15:00	Crow Trees Ground	L. Bland

=== Round 18 ===
Betfred League One: round eighteen
Home	Score	Away	Match Information
Home	Score	Away	Date and Time	Venue	Referee	Attendance
North Wales Crusaders	12–24	Swinton Lions	3 August 2025, 14:30	Eirias Stadium	D. Arnold	770
Newcastle Thunder	10–64	Dewsbury Rams	3 August 2025, 15:00	Crow Trees Ground	C. Hughes
Rochdale Hornets	36–32	Whitehaven	3 August 2025, 15:00	Spotland Stadium	L. Bland
Workington Town	25–22	Keighley Cougars	3 August 2025, 15:00	Derwent Park	A. Williams

=== Round 19 ===
Betfred League One: round nineteen
Home	Score	Away	Match Information
Home	Score	Away	Date and Time	Venue	Referee	Attendance
Dewsbury Rams	20–36	Workington Town	10 August 2025, 15:00	Crown Flatt	D. Arnold
Goole Vikings	28–4	Swinton Lions	10 August 2025, 15:00	Victoria Pleasure Grounds	L. Bland	636
Keighley Cougars	56–0	Newcastle Thunder	10 August 2025, 15:00	Cougar Park	M. Mckelvey	978
Rochdale Hornets	20–16	North Wales Crusaders	10 August 2025, 15:00	Spotland Stadium	K. Moore
Whitehaven	26–16	Midlands Hurricanes	10 August 2025, 15:00	Recreation Ground	C. Hughes	639

=== Round 20 ===
Betfred League One: round twenty
Home	Score	Away	Match Information
Home	Score	Away	Date and Time	Venue	Referee	Attendance
Midlands Hurricanes	22–24	Keighley Cougars	24 August 2025, 14:00	Alexander Stadium	D. Arnold	405
North Wales Crusaders	31–6	Goole Vikings	24 August 2025, 14:30	Eirias Stadium	A. Williams
Newcastle Thunder	10–28	Whitehaven	24 August 2025, 15:00	Crow Trees Ground	A. Sweet
Swinton Lions	18–12	Rochdale Hornets	24 August 2025, 15:00	Heywood Road	A. Belafonte	963

=== Round 21 ===
Betfred League One: round twenty one
Home	Score	Away	Match Information
Home	Score	Away	Date and Time	Venue	Referee	Attendance
North Wales Crusaders	30–16	Keighley Cougars	31 August 2025, 14:30	Eirias Stadium	A. Sweet
Dewsbury Rams	40–4	Midlands Hurricanes	31 August 2025, 15:00	Crown Flatt	L. Bland
Goole Vikings	30–12	Newcastle Thunder	31 August 2025, 15:00	Victoria Pleasure Grounds	D. Arnold
Workington Town	36–4	Rochdale Hornets	31 August 2025, 15:00	Derwent Park	K. Moore

=== Round 22 ===
Betfred League One: round twenty two
Home	Score	Away	Match Information
Home	Score	Away	Date and Time	Venue	Referee	Attendance
Goole Vikings	6–12 (Note: Match abandoned after 73 minutes due to a medical emergency off the pitch)	Workington Town	6 September 2025, 15:00	Victoria Pleasure Grounds	K. Moore
Whitehaven	28–24	North Wales Crusaders	6 September 2025, 15:00	Recreation Ground	A. Belafonte
Midlands Hurricanes	58–4	Newcastle Thunder	7 September 2025, 14:00	Alexander Stadium	A. Williams	275
Rochdale Hornets	32–36	Dewsbury Rams	7 September 2025, 15:00	Spotland Stadium	A. Sweet	1,024
