= 2024 RFL League One results =

Rugby league competition results

The fixture list for the 2024 RFL League One was issued on 3 December 2023. The regular season comprised 23 rounds to be followed by the play-offs. Each club had 20 fixtures with three bye weeks.

All times are UK local time (UTC±00:00 until 31 March 2024, UTC+01:00 thereafter).

== Regular season ==
=== Round 1 ===
Betfred League One: round one
Home	Score	Away	Match Information
Home	Score	Away	Date and Time	Venue	Referee	Attendance
Hunslet	48–12	Newcastle Thunder	17 March 2024, 13:00	South Leeds Stadium	L. Bland	402
Keighley Cougars	56–12	Cornwall	17 March 2024, 13:00	Cougar Park	A. Sweet	971
Midlands Hurricanes	28–38	Rochdale Hornets	17 March 2024, 15:00	Alexander Stadium	M. Lynn	465
Workington Town	10–48	Oldham	17 March 2024, 15:00	Derwent Park	N. Bennett	685

=== Round 2 ===
Betfred League One: round two
Home	Score	Away	Match Information
Home	Score	Away	Date and Time	Venue	Referee	Attendance
Cornwall	16–40	North Wales Crusaders	24 March 2024, 12:30	Truro College (Note: Venue changed as the Memorial Ground was unplayable due to poor weather.)	A. Belafonte	300
Keighley Cougars	58–16	Workington Town	24 March 2024, 15:00	Cougar Park	M. Lynn	916
Midlands Hurricanes	70–16	Newcastle Thunder	24 March 2024, 15:00	Alexander Stadium	A. Sweet	377
Rochdale Hornets	24–26	Hunslet	24 March 2024, 15:00	Spotland Stadium	N. Bennett	448

=== Round 3 ===
Betfred League One: round three
Home	Score	Away	Match Information
Home	Score	Away	Date and Time	Venue	Referee	Attendance
Hunslet	14–42	Keighley Cougars	29 March 2024, 19:30	South Leeds Stadium	K. Moore	618
Newcastle Thunder	18–48	Workington Town	30 March 2024, 15:00	Kingston Park	L. Bland	412
North Wales Crusaders	20–14	Midlands Hurricanes	31 March 2024, 14:30	Eirias Stadium	R. Cox	707
Oldham	54–6	Rochdale Hornets	31 March 2024, 15:00	Boundary Park	A. Sweet	2,041

=== Round 4 ===
Betfred League One: round four
Home	Score	Away	Match Information
Home	Score	Away	Date and Time	Venue	Referee	Attendance
North Wales Crusaders	58–18	Newcastle Thunder	7 April 2024, 14:30	Eirias Stadium	A. Sweet	306
Hunslet	0–62	Oldham	7 April 2024, 15:00	South Leeds Stadium	B. Milligan	725
Workington Town	32–22	Rochdale Hornets	7 April 2024, 15:00	Derwent Park	N. Bennett	614

=== Round 5 ===
Betfred League One: round five
Home	Score	Away	Match Information
Home	Score	Away	Date and Time	Venue	Referee	Attendance
Oldham	46–10	Cornwall	14 April 2024, 13:00	Boundary Park	T. Jones	1,136
Keighley Cougars	22–6	North Wales Crusaders	14 April 2024, 15:00	Cougar Park	M. Lynn	1,096
Midlands Hurricanes	26–30	Hunslet	14 April 2024, 15:00	Sheffield Olympic Legacy Stadium (Note: Match relocated to Sheffield as the Alexander Stadium is unavailable.)	K. Moore	302
Rochdale Hornets	68–4	Newcastle Thunder	14 April 2024, 15:00	Spotland Stadium	A. Belafonte	379

=== Round 6 ===
Betfred League One: round six
Home	Score	Away	Match Information
Home	Score	Away	Date and Time	Venue	Referee	Attendance
North Wales Crusaders	36–37	Rochdale Hornets	21 April 2024, 14:30	Eirias Stadium	A. Belafonte	511
Cornwall	6–72	Midlands Hurricanes	21 April 2024, 15:00	The Memorial Ground	A. Williams	456
Hunslet	18–30	Workington Town	21 April 2024, 15:00	South Leeds Stadium	L. Bland	410
Newcastle Thunder	6–82	Keighley Cougars	21 April 2024, 15:00	Kingston Park	S. Houghton	461

=== Round 7 ===
Betfred League One: round seven
Home	Score	Away	Match Information
Home	Score	Away	Date and Time	Venue	Referee	Attendance
Midlands Hurricanes	16–44	Oldham	27 April 2024, 14:00	Alexander Stadium	T. Jones	367
Workington Town	52–18	Cornwall	28 April 2024, 13:00	Derwent Park	A. Sweet	599
Hunslet	22–14	North Wales Crusaders	28 April 2024, 15:00	South Leeds Stadium	N. Bennett	396
Rochdale Hornets	30–42	Keighley Cougars	28 April 2024, 15:00	Spotland Stadium	B. Milligan	734

=== Round 8 ===
Betfred League One: round eight
Home	Score	Away	Match Information
Home	Score	Away	Date and Time	Venue	Referee	Attendance
Keighley Cougars	16–24	Hunslet	5 May 2024, 15:00	Cougar Park	N. Bennett	1,389
Oldham	74–0	Newcastle Thunder	5 May 2024, 15:00	Boundary Park	A. Williams	1,303
Rochdale Hornets	56–24	Cornwall	5 May 2024, 15:00	Spotland Stadium	L. Bland	891
Workington Town	16–26	Midlands Hurricanes	5 May 2024, 15:00	Derwent Park	A. Belafonte	678

=== Round 9 ===
Betfred League One: round nine
Home	Score	Away	Match Information
Home	Score	Away	Date and Time	Venue	Referee	Attendance
Cornwall	0–42	Oldham	19 May 2024, 13:00	The Memorial Ground	D. Arnold
North Wales Crusaders	10–30	Keighley Cougars	19 May 2024, 14:30	Eirias Stadium	N. Bennett	462
Midlands Hurricanes	66–4	Newcastle Thunder	19 May 2024, 15:00	Alexander Stadium	B. Milligan	302
Rochdale Hornets	56–12	Workington Town	19 May 2024, 15:00	Spotland Stadium	A. Sweet	797

=== Round 10 ===
Betfred League One: round ten
Home	Score	Away	Match Information
Home	Score	Away	Date and Time	Venue	Referee	Attendance
Hunslet	42–16	Cornwall	26 May 2024, 13:00	South Leeds Stadium	T. Jones	296
Keighley Cougars	28–18	Oldham	26 May 2024, 15:00	Cougar Park	N. Bennett	1,852
Midlands Hurricanes	18–10	North Wales Crusaders	26 May 2024, 15:00	Alexander Stadium	A. Williams	527
Newcastle Thunder	18–24	Rochdale Hornets	26 May 2024, 15:00	Gateshead International Stadium	D. Arnold	326

=== Round 11 ===
Betfred League One: round eleven
Home	Score	Away	Match Information
Home	Score	Away	Date and Time	Venue	Referee	Attendance
North Wales Crusaders	24–25	Oldham	1 June 2024, 17:00	Eirias Stadium	B. Milligan	756
Cornwall	30–6	Newcastle Thunder	2 June 2024, 13:00	The Memorial Ground	A. Billington
Midlands Hurricanes	18–25	Keighley Cougars	2 June 2024, 14:00	Alexander Stadium	K. Moore	463
Workington Town	22–24	Hunslet	2 June 2024, 15:00	Derwent Park	N. Bennett	1,486

=== Round 12 ===
Betfred League One: round twelve
Home	Score	Away	Match Information
Home	Score	Away	Date and Time	Venue	Referee	Attendance
North Wales Crusaders	34–32	Workington Town	16 June 2024, 14:30	Eirias Stadium	D. Arnold	459
Cornwall	14–38	Rochdale Hornets	16 June 2024, 15:00	The Memorial Ground	C. Hughes
Hunslet	25–18	Midlands Hurricanes	16 June 2024, 15:00	South Leeds Stadium	B. Milligan	504
Newcastle Thunder	6–60	Oldham	16 June 2024, 15:00	Gateshead International Stadium	A. Sweet

=== Round 13 ===
Betfred League One: round thirteen
Home	Score	Away	Match Information
Home	Score	Away	Date and Time	Venue	Referee	Attendance
Cornwall	0–26	Keighley Cougars	23 June 2024, 13:00	The Memorial Ground	A. Williams
Newcastle Thunder	4–42	North Wales Crusaders	23 June 2024, 14:00	Crow Trees, Swalwell (Note: Gateshead Stadium not available, game played at Blaydon RFC.)	B. Milligan
Hunslet	18–48	Rochdale Hornets	23 June 2024, 15:00	South Leeds Stadium	W. Turley	402
Workington Town	4–28	Oldham	23 June 2024, 15:00	Derwent Park	N. Bennett	706

=== Round 14 ===
Betfred League One: round fourteen
Home	Score	Away	Match Information
Home	Score	Away	Date and Time	Venue	Referee	Attendance
Cornwall	10–16	North Wales Crusaders	30 June 2024, 13:00	The Memorial Ground	A. Billington
Newcastle Thunder	10–44	Midlands Hurricanes	30 June 2024, 14:00	Gateshead International Stadium	N. Bennett
Oldham	30–6	Hunslet	30 June 2024, 14:00	Boundary Park	B. Milligan	1,126
Workington Town	18–37	Keighley Cougars	30 June 2024, 14:00	Derwent Park	D. Arnold	793

=== Round 15 ===
Betfred League One: round fifteen
Home	Score	Away	Match Information
Home	Score	Away	Date and Time	Venue	Referee	Attendance
North Wales Crusaders	18–32	Midlands Hurricanes	7 July 2024, 14:30	Eirias Stadium	G. Poumes	552
Keighley Cougars	20–20	Rochdale Hornets	7 July 2024, 15:00	Cougar Park	W. Turley	1,608
Newcastle Thunder	0–44	Workington Town	7 July 2024, 15:00	Gateshead International Stadium	M. Smaill

=== Round 16 ===
Betfred League One: round sixteen
Home	Score	Away	Match Information
Home	Score	Away	Date and Time	Venue	Referee	Attendance
Newcastle Thunder	16–42	Hunslet	14 July 2024, 14:00	Gateshead International Stadium	A. Sweet
Midlands Hurricanes	22–24	Cornwall	12 May 2024, 15:00 (Note: Brought forward from 14 July.)	Alexander Stadium	A. Sweet	271
Oldham	32–6	North Wales Crusaders	14 July 2024, 15:00	Boundary Park	R. Cox	1,270
Workington Town	14–12	Rochdale Hornets	14 July 2024, 15:00	Derwent Park	M. Lynn	573

=== Round 17 ===
Betfred League One: round seventeen
Home	Score	Away	Match Information
Home	Score	Away	Date and Time	Venue	Referee	Attendance
Cornwall	8–30	Workington Town	21 July 2024, 13:00	The Memorial Ground	A. Williams
North Wales Crusaders	16–46	Hunslet	21 July 2024, 14:30	Eirias Stadium	A. Belafonte	488
Oldham	44–6	Keighley Cougars	21 July 2024, 15:00	Boundary Park	K. Moore	2,572
Rochdale Hornets	14–10	Midlands Hurricanes	21 July 2024, 15:00	Spotland Stadium	A. Sweet	676

=== Round 18 ===
Betfred League One: round eighteen
Home	Score	Away	Match Information
Home	Score	Away	Date and Time	Venue	Referee	Attendance
Newcastle Thunder	34–44	Cornwall	28 July 2024, 14:00	Gateshead International Stadium	A. Belafonte	329
Hunslet	24–32	Workington Town	28 July 2024, 15:00	South Leeds Stadium	W. Turley	572
Keighley Cougars	36–12	Midlands Hurricanes	28 July 2024, 15:00	Cougar Park	A. Williams	1,056
Rochdale Hornets	10–14	Oldham	28 July 2024, 15:00	Spotland Stadium	D. Arnold	2,178

=== Round 19 ===
Betfred League One: round nineteen
Home	Score	Away	Match Information
Home	Score	Away	Date and Time	Venue	Referee	Attendance
Keighley Cougars	72–12	Newcastle Thunder	4 August 2024, 15:00	Cougar Park	N. Bennett	968
Oldham	32–0	Midlands Hurricanes	4 August 2024, 15:00	Boundary Park	W. Turley	1,682
Rochdale Hornets	46–32	Cornwall	4 August 2024, 15:00	Spotland Stadium	B. Milligan	427
Workington Town	24–28	North Wales Crusaders	4 August 2024, 15:00	Derwent Park	L. Bland	857

=== Round 20 ===
Betfred League One: round twenty
Home	Score	Away	Match Information
Home	Score	Away	Date and Time	Venue	Referee	Attendance
Cornwall	26–33	Hunslet	10 August 2024, 13:00	The Memorial Ground	S. Jenkinson
Midlands Hurricanes	34–22	Workington Town	11 August 2024, 14:00	Alexander Stadium	D. Arnold	677
North Wales Crusaders	16–24	Keighley Cougars	11 August 2024, 14:30	Hare Lane, Chester	K. Moore	401
Oldham	84–0	Newcastle Thunder	11 August 2024, 15:00	Boundary Park	B. Millgan	1,006

=== Round 21 ===
Betfred League One: round twenty one
Home	Score	Away	Match Information
Home	Score	Away	Date and Time	Venue	Referee	Attendance
Newcastle Thunder	6–78	Rochdale Hornets	17 August 2024, 15:00	Gateshead International Stadium	C. Hughes	220
Cornwall	6–18	Midlands Hurricanes	18 August 2024, 15:00	The Memorial Ground	S. Houghton
Hunslet	28–20	North Wales Crusaders	18 August 2024, 15:00	South Leeds Stadium	L. Bland	556
Keighley Cougars	12–20	Oldham	18 August 2024, 15:00	Cougar Park	M. Lynn	2,174

=== Round 22 ===
Betfred League One: round twenty two
Home	Score	Away	Match Information
Home	Score	Away	Date and Time	Venue	Referee	Attendance
Oldham	72–0	Cornwall	25 August 2024, 13:00	Boundary Park	A. Belafonte	1,421
Keighley Cougars	40–22	Hunslet	25 August 2024, 15:00	Cougar Park	A. Sweet	1,642
Rochdale Hornets	28–10	North Wales Crusaders	25 August 2024, 15:00	Spotland Stadium	B. Milligan	657
Workington Town	46–0	Newcastle Thunder	25 August 2024, 15:00	Derwent Park	S. Jenkinson	631

=== Round 23 ===
Betfred League One: round twenty three
Home	Score	Away	Match Information
Home	Score	Away	Date and Time	Venue	Referee	Attendance
Midlands Hurricanes	22–28	Hunslet	31 August 2024, 15:00	Alexander Stadium	B. Milligan	420
North Wales Crusaders	40–10	Cornwall	1 September 2024, 14:30	Eirias Stadium	A. Williams	755
Oldham	56–0	Workington Town	1 September 2024, 15:00	Boundary Park	W. Turley	2,681
Rochdale Hornets	32–18	Keighley Cougars	1 September 2024, 15:00	Spotland Stadium	D. Arnold	1,474

== Play-offs ==
=== Team bracket ===
Qualifying & elimination play-offs
3	Rochdale Hornets	30
4	Hunslet	18
5	Midlands Hurricanes	24
6	Workington Town	22

Semi-finals
2	Keighley Cougars	26
3	Rochdale Hornets	22
4	Hunslet	18
5	Midlands Hurricanes	14

Preliminary final
3	Rochdale Hornets	26
4	Hunslet	46

Play-off final
2	Keighley Cougars	6
4	Hunslet	20

=== Week 1: Qualifying and elimination play-offs ===
Qualifying play-off

15 September 2024
15:00

Rochdale Hornets	30–18	Hunslet
Tries: Juma, Else (2), Andrade, Forber, Harrop; Goals: Harman (3)		Tries: Ferreira, Goddard, Render (2); Goals: Beharrell

Spotland Stadium
Attendance: 826
Referee: K. Moore

Elimination play-off

15 September 2024
15:00

Midlands Hurricanes	24–22	Workington Town
Tries: Hewitt, Luke-Kirby, Chrimes; Goals: Sweeting (6)		Tries: Burns (2), Brennan, Bickerdike; Goals: Forber (3)

Alexander Stadium
Referee: M. Lynn

=== Week 2: Semi-finals ===
Qualifying semi-final

22 September 2024
15:00

Keighley Cougars	26–22	Rochdale Hornets
Tries: Lanskey, Lynam, Miller, Ioane; Goals: Miller (5/6)		Tries: Roberts, Andrade, Forber, Harrop; Goals: Harman (3/4)

Cougar Park
Attendance: 1,037
Referee: B. Thaler

Elimination semi-final

22 September 2024
15:00

Hunslet	18–14	Midlands Hurricanes
Tries: Ferreira, Delaney, Render; Goals: Beharrell (3/4)		Tries: Clavering, Barcoe; Goals: Sweeting (3/3)

South Leeds Stadium
Attendance: 474
Referee: R. Cox

=== Week 3: Preliminary final ===
Played between the losing team of the qualifying semi-final and the winning team of the elimination semi-final. The match was played at the ground of the team that finished higher during the regular season.

Preliminary final

29 September 2024
15:00

Rochdale Hornets	26–46	Hunslet
Tries: Derbyshire, Nelmes, Andrade, Taulapapa, Forber; Goals: Harman (3/5)		Tries: Flanagan (2), Berry, Turner, Render (2), Ferreira, Wood; Goals: Beharrell (7/8)

Spotland Stadium
Attendance: 428
Referee: S. Mikalauskas

=== Week 4: Play-off final ===
Played between the winning team of the qualifying semi-final and the winning team of the preliminary final. The match was played at the ground of the team that finished higher during the regular season.

Play-off final

6 October 2024
15:00

Keighley Cougars	6–20	Hunslet
Tries: Flanagan; Goals: Miller (1/1)		Tries: Wood, Turner, Render; Goals: Beharrell (4/6)

Cougar Park
Attendance: 1,057
Referee: C. Worsley

== Championship play-off ==
Due to structure changes agreed before the season started, the play-off final winners did not automatically gain promotion and had to play a final match against the team that finishes 12th in the 2024 Championship. The winners of the match play in the Championship for 2025 and the losing team play in League One for 2025. Hunslet travelled to Swinton and won 22–20 to return to the Championship, from where they were relegated in 2013.

Championship play-off

13 October 2024
19:30

Swinton Lions	20–22	Hunslet
Tries: Williams, Cox, Wood, Vaughan; Goals: Abram (2/4)		Tries: Turner, Berry, Flanagan, Render; Goals: Beharrell (3/4)

Heywood Road
Attendance: 885
Referee: J. Vella
