= 2022 RFL League 1 results =

Rugby league competition results

The fixture list for the 2022 RFL League 1 season was released on 13 November 2021. The regular season, comprising 22 rounds, started on Saturday 26 March 2022 and ended on Sunday 4 September 2022.

All times are UK summer time (UTC+01:00) on the relevant dates, except the match on 26 March 2022 which is UK winter time (UTC±00:00).

== Regular season ==
=== Round 1 ===
Betfred League 1: round one
Home	Score	Away	Match Information
Home	Score	Away	Date and Time	Venue	Referee	Attendance
London Skolars	10–28	Hunslet	26 March 2022, 15:00	New River Stadium	N. Bennett	287
Doncaster	48–20	Midlands Hurricanes	27 March 2022, 15:00	Eco-Power Stadium	C. Worsley	786
Oldham	6–32	Keighley Cougars	27 March 2022, 15:00	Whitebank Stadium	J. Vella	815
Rochdale Hornets	34–36	North Wales Crusaders	27 March 2022, 15:00	Spotland Stadium	L. Rush	448
Swinton Lions	82–4	West Wales Raiders	27 March 2022, 15:00	Heywood Road	S. Mikalauskas	853

=== Round 2 ===
Betfred League 1: round two
Home	Score	Away	Match Information
Home	Score	Away	Date and Time	Venue	Referee	Attendance
West Wales Raiders	12–52	Rochdale Hornets	2 April 2022, 15:00	Stebonheath Park	M. Rossleigh	261
North Wales Crusaders	62–22	Cornwall	2 April 2022, 17:30	Eirias Stadium	M. Mannifield	590
Hunslet	22–22	Oldham	3 April 2022, 15:00	South Leeds Stadium	B. Milligan	654
Keighley Cougars	26–6	Doncaster	3 April 2022, 15:00	Cougar Park	S. Mikalauskas	863
Midlands Hurricanes	16–54	Swinton Lions	3 April 2022, 15:00	Portway Stadium	L. Rush	478

=== Round 3 ===
Betfred League 1: round three
Home	Score	Away	Match Information
Home	Score	Away	Date and Time	Venue	Referee	Attendance
London Skolars	6–54	North Wales Crusaders	9 April 2022, 15:00	New River Stadium	M. Rossleigh	186
Cornwall	14–60	Midlands Hurricanes	10 April 2022, 13:00	The Memorial Ground	J. Jones	1,473
Doncaster	22–64	Swinton Lions	10 April 2022, 15:00	Eco-Power Stadium	J. Vella	1,015
Oldham	100–4	West Wales Raiders	10 April 2022, 15:00	Whitebank Stadium	L. Rush	651
Rochdale Hornets	44–20	Hunslet	10 April 2022, 15:00	Spotland Stadium	M. Mannifield	415

=== Round 4 ===
Betfred League 1: round four
Home	Score	Away	Match Information
Home	Score	Away	Date and Time	Venue	Referee	Attendance
Rochdale Hornets	34–18	Oldham	15 April 2022, 15:00	Spotland Stadium	L. Rush	920
Hunslet	16–20	Keighley Cougars	15 April 2022, 19:30	South Leeds Stadium	K. Moore	714
Doncaster	52–16	Cornwall	17 April 2022, 15:00	Eco-Power Stadium	M. Mannifield	943
Midlands Hurricanes	50–28	London Skolars	17 April 2022, 15:00	Portway Stadium	B. Milligan	176
Swinton Lions	6–13	North Wales Crusaders	17 April 2022, 15:00	Heywood Road	M. Rossleigh	1,081

=== Round 5 ===
Betfred League 1: round five
Home	Score	Away	Match Information
Home	Score	Away	Date and Time	Venue	Referee	Attendance
London Skolars	22–56	Rochdale Hornets	23 April 2022, 15:00	New River Stadium	A. Sweet	184
West Wales Raiders	0–48 (Note: West Wales forfeited the match due to being unable to arrange the required medical cover.)	Doncaster	—N/a
Keighley Cougars	30–0	Swinton Lions	24 April 2022, 15:00	Cougar Park	B. Milligan	1,233
North Wales Crusaders	22–18	Midlands Hurricanes	24 April 2022, 15:00	Eirias Stadium	K. Moore	379
Oldham	48–22	Cornwall	24 April 2022, 15:00	Whitebank Stadium	L. Rush	621

=== Round 6 ===
Betfred League 1: round six
Home	Score	Away	Match Information
Home	Score	Away	Date and Time	Venue	Referee	Attendance
Cornwall	0–50	Rochdale Hornets	1 May 2022, 13:00	The Memorial Ground	A. Sweet	903
North Wales Crusaders	84–4	West Wales Raiders	1 May 2022, 14:30	Eirias Stadium	B. Milligan	503
Doncaster	16–12	Oldham	1 May 2022, 15:00	Eco-Power Stadium	M. Rossleigh	1,095
Keighley Cougars	96–0	London Skolars	1 May 2022, 15:00	Cougar Park	M. Mannifield	1,148
Midlands Hurricanes	16–22	Hunslet	1 May 2022, 15:00	Portway Stadium	L. Rush	253

=== Round 7 ===
Betfred League 1: round seven
Home	Score	Away	Match Information
Home	Score	Away	Date and Time	Venue	Referee	Attendance
Rochdale Hornets	44–24	Midlands Hurricanes	7 May 2022, 15:00	Spotland Stadium	M. Mannifield	327
West Wales Raiders	4–46	Keighley Cougars	7 May 2022, 15:00	Stebonheath Park	J. Jones	387
Doncaster	0–46	North Wales Crusaders	8 May 2022, 15:00	Eco-Power Stadium	J. Vella	1,097
Hunslet	52–16	Cornwall	8 May 2022, 15:00	South Leeds Stadium	M. Rossleigh	565
Swinton Lions	58–14	London Skolars	8 May 2022, 15:00	Heywood Road	K. Moore	768

=== Round 8 ===
Betfred League 1: round eight
Home	Score	Away	Match Information
Home	Score	Away	Date and Time	Venue	Referee	Attendance
London Skolars	12–44	Doncaster	14 May 2022, 15:00	New River Stadium	M. Rossleigh	180
North Wales Crusaders	30–16	Oldham	14 May 2022, 17:30	Eirias Stadium	M. Mannifield	494
Cornwall	0–20	West Wales Raiders	15 May 2022, 15:00	The Memorial Ground	K. Moore	1,153
Hunslet	16–28	Swinton Lions	15 May 2022, 15:00	South Leeds Stadium	B. Milligan	542
Keighley Cougars	40–16	Rochdale Hornets	15 May 2022, 15:00	Cougar Park	L. Rush	1,847

=== Round 9 ===
Betfred League 1: round nine
Home	Score	Away	Match Information
Home	Score	Away	Date and Time	Venue	Referee	Attendance
Swinton Lions	54–16	Cornwall	21 May 2022, 14:00	Heywood Road	M. Mannifield	678
Rochdale Hornets	46–28	Doncaster	21 May 2022, 15:00	Spotland Stadium	N. Bennett	354
West Wales Raiders	12–50	Hunslet	21 May 2022, 15:00	Stebonheath Park	K. Moore	315
Keighley Cougars	29–18	Midlands Hurricanes	22 May 2022, 15:00	Cougar Park	B. Milligan	1,126
London Skolars	38–16	Oldham	27 May 2022, 19:00	New River Stadium	L. Bland	872

=== Round 10 ===
Betfred League 1: round ten
Home	Score	Away	Match Information
Home	Score	Away	Date and Time	Venue	Referee	Attendance
Cornwall	20–24	London Skolars	4 June 2022, 13:00	The Memorial Ground	J. Jones	827
North Wales Crusaders	12–56	Keighley Cougars	4 June 2022, 17:30	Eirias Stadium	M. Mannifield	835
Doncaster	36–6	Hunslet	5 June 2022, 15:00	Eco-Power Stadium	B. Milligan	1,121
Midlands Hurricanes	56–12	West Wales Raiders	5 June 2022, 15:00	Portway Stadium	A. Sweet	168
Oldham	6–12	Swinton Lions	5 June 2022, 15:00	Whitebank Stadium	K. Moore	905

=== Round 11 ===
Betfred League 1: round eleven
Home	Score	Away	Match Information
Home	Score	Away	Date and Time	Venue	Referee	Attendance
West Wales Raiders	16–38	London Skolars	11 June 2022, 15:00	Stebonheath Park	L. Bland	592
Cornwall	12–56	Keighley Cougars	12 June 2022, 13:00	The Memorial Ground	J. MacMullen	1,082
Hunslet	30–22	North Wales Crusaders	12 June 2022, 15:00	South Leeds Stadium	A. Sweet	554
Oldham	66–0	Midlands Hurricanes	12 June 2022, 15:00	Whitebank Stadium	B. Milligan	673
Swinton Lions	34–14	Rochdale Hornets	12 June 2022, 15:00	Heywood Road	M. Mannifield	1,029

=== Round 12 ===
Betfred League 1: round twelve
Home	Score	Away	Match Information
Home	Score	Away	Date and Time	Venue	Referee	Attendance
Hunslet	24–32	Rochdale Hornets	25 June 2022, 15:00	South Leeds Stadium	L. Rush	784
London Skolars	22–48	Swinton Lions	25 June 2022, 15:00	New River Stadium	K. Moore	286
West Wales Raiders	4–24	Cornwall	25 June 2022, 15:00	Stebonheath Park	J. Jones	344
North Wales Crusaders	18–26	Doncaster	26 June 2022, 14:30	Eirias Stadium	N. Bennett	306
Keighley Cougars	62–0	Oldham	26 June 2022, 15:00	Cougar Park	C. Worsley	2,427

=== Round 13 ===
Betfred League 1: round thirteen
Home	Score	Away	Match Information
Home	Score	Away	Date and Time	Venue	Referee	Attendance
Cornwall	24–36	Hunslet	2 July 2022, 15:00	The Memorial Ground	R. Cox	946
North Wales Crusaders	30–16	London Skolars	3 July 2022, 14:30	Eirias Stadium	J. Jones	218
Keighley Cougars	86–0	West Wales Raiders	3 July 2022, 15:00	Cougar Park	B. Milligan	1,924
Midlands Hurricanes	34–42	Rochdale Hornets	3 July 2022, 15:00	Portway Stadium	M. Mannifield	417
Swinton Lions	12–26	Doncaster	3 July 2022, 15:00	Heywood Road	S. Mikalauskas	772

=== Round 14 ===
Betfred League 1: round fourteen
Home	Score	Away	Match Information
Home	Score	Away	Date and Time	Venue	Referee	Attendance
Cornwall	10–44	Doncaster	9 July 2022, 13:00	The Memorial Ground	A. Belafonte	807
London Skolars	0–48 (Note: Match forfeited by London Skolars as the club were unable to arrange medical cover.)	Keighley Cougars	—N/a
Midlands Hurricanes	16–46	North Wales Crusaders	9 July 2022, 17:30	Portway Stadium	K. Moore	656
Hunslet	54–6	West Wales Raiders	10 July 2022, 15:00	South Leeds Stadium	L. Bland	348
Oldham	24–50	Rochdale Hornets	10 July 2022, 15:00	Whitebank Stadium	J. MacMullen	938

=== Round 15 ===
Betfred League 1: round fifteen
Home	Score	Away	Match Information
Home	Score	Away	Date and Time	Venue	Referee	Attendance
West Wales Raiders	4–76	North Wales Crusaders	16 July 2022, 15:00	Stebonheath Park	M. Lynn	248
Keighley Cougars	68–0	Cornwall	17 July 2022, 13:00	Cougar Park	K. Moore	1,058
Hunslet	43–16	London Skolars	17 July 2022, 15:00	South Leeds Stadium	A. Moore	314
Oldham	12–64	Doncaster	17 July 2022, 15:00	Whitebank Stadium	C. Worsley	528
Swinton Lions	54–22	Midlands Hurricanes	17 July 2022, 15:00	Heywood Road	M. Mannifield	682

=== Round 16 ===
Betfred League 1: round sixteen
Home	Score	Away	Match Information
Home	Score	Away	Date and Time	Venue	Referee	Attendance
Cornwall	10–44	Swinton Lions	23 July 2022, 13:00	The Memorial Ground	M. Lynn	1,046
West Wales Raiders	0–38	Oldham	23 July 2022, 15:00	Stebonheath Park	A. Sweet	203
North Wales Crusaders	36–26	Hunslet	23 July 2022, 17:30	Eirias Stadium	B. Milligan	870
Midlands Hurricanes	6–54	Keighley Cougars	24 July 2022, 15:00	Portway Stadium	A. Moore	358
Rochdale Hornets	32–14	London Skolars	24 July 2022, 15:00	Spotland Stadium	K. Moore	373

=== Round 17 ===
Betfred League 1: round seventeen
Home	Score	Away	Match Information
Home	Score	Away	Date and Time	Venue	Referee	Attendance
Hunslet	0–24	Midlands Hurricanes	29 July 2022, 19:45	South Leeds Stadium	K. Moore	430
London Skolars	46–6	Cornwall	30 July 2022, 15:00	New River Stadium	J. Jones	271
Doncaster	62–6	West Wales Raiders	31 July 2022, 15:00	Eco-Power Stadium	M. Mannifield	691
Oldham	16–29	North Wales Crusaders	31 July 2022, 15:00	Whitebank Stadium	M. Rossleigh	508
Rochdale Hornets	22–53	Swinton Lions	31 July 2022, 15:00	Spotland Stadium	A. Moore	642

=== Round 18 ===
Betfred League 1: round eighteen
Home	Score	Away	Match Information
Home	Score	Away	Date and Time	Venue	Referee	Attendance
London Skolars	66–18	West Wales Raiders	6 August 2022, 15:00	New River Stadium	R. Cox	230
Cornwall	12–36	North Wales Crusaders	7 August 2022, 13:00	The Memorial Ground	L. Bland	1,031
Doncaster	26–20	Rochdale Hornets	7 August 2022, 15:00	Eco-Power Stadium	K. Moore	1,067
Swinton Lions	22–26	Keighley Cougars	7 August 2022, 15:00	Heywood Road	M. Mannifield	1,090
Midlands Hurricanes	36–41	Oldham	7 August 2022, 17:30	Portway Stadium	B. Milligan	183

=== Round 19 ===
Betfred League 1: round nineteen
Home	Score	Away	Match Information
Home	Score	Away	Date and Time	Venue	Referee	Attendance
West Wales Raiders	6–94	Swinton Lions	13 August 2022, 15:00	Stebonheath Park	M. Mannifield	213
Keighley Cougars	60–18	Hunslet	14 August 2022, 15:00	Cougar Park	M. Smaill	2,182
Midlands Hurricanes	18–52	Doncaster	14 August 2022, 15:00	Portway Stadium	M. Rossleigh	194
Oldham	60–6	London Skolars	14 August 2022, 15:00	Whitebank Stadium	M. Lynn	481
Rochdale Hornets	34–14	Cornwall	14 August 2022, 15:00	Spotland Stadium	C. Worsley	338

=== Round 20 ===
Betfred League 1: round twenty
Home	Score	Away	Match Information
Home	Score	Away	Date and Time	Venue	Referee	Attendance
West Wales Raiders	4–36	Midlands Hurricanes	20 August 2022, 15:00	Stebonheath Park	A. Belafonte	382
North Wales Crusaders	28–24	Rochdale Hornets	20 August 2022, 17:30	Eirias Stadium	M. Mannifield	691
Cornwall	12–32	Oldham	21 August 2022, 13:00	The Memorial Ground	N. Bennett	1,182
Doncaster	18–48	Keighley Cougars	21 August 2022, 15:00	Eco-Power Stadium	S. Mikalauskas	1,443
Swinton Lions	38–12	Hunslet	21 August 2022, 15:00	Heywood Road	B. Milligan	875

=== Round 21 ===
Betfred League 1: round twenty-one
Home	Score	Away	Match Information
Home	Score	Away	Date and Time	Venue	Referee	Attendance
Hunslet	20–32	Doncaster	26 August 2022, 19:30	South Leeds Stadium	J. McMullen	628
London Skolars	38–34	Midlands Hurricanes	27 August 2022, 15:00	New River Stadium	J. Jones	202
Keighley Cougars	50–18	North Wales Crusaders	28 August 2022, 15:00	Cougar Park	M. Mannifield	2,712
Rochdale Hornets	102–4	West Wales Raiders	28 August 2022, 15:00	Spotland Stadium	B. Milligan	215
Swinton Lions	35–6	Oldham	28 August 2022, 15:00	Heywood Road	K. Moore	1,009

=== Round 22 ===
Betfred League 1: round twenty-two
Home	Score	Away	Match Information
Home	Score	Away	Date and Time	Venue	Referee	Attendance
North Wales Crusaders	12–38	Swinton Lions	3 September 2022, 14:30	Victoria Park, Warrington	M. Rossleigh	751
Doncaster	70–22	London Skolars	4 September 2022, 15:00	Eco-Power Stadium	M. Mannifield	1,105
Midlands Hurricanes	42–26	Cornwall	4 September 2022, 15:00	Portway Stadium	B. Milligan	232
Oldham	30–18	Hunslet	4 September 2022, 15:00	Whitebank Stadium	C. Worsley	814
Rochdale Hornets	24–56	Keighley Cougars	4 September 2022, 15:00	Spotland Stadium	S. Mikalauskas	963

== Play-offs ==
The play-offs follow the same structure used since 2019. The teams finishing second to fifth in the regular season compete over a four-round play-off series. In each round one team is eliminated with the winners of the play-off final joining Keighley in being promoted to the 2023 Championship.

All matches are played at the ground of the higher placed team. The team finishing second in the regular season has a bye to the second round of the play-offs and home advantage in their matches. In the first round - the qualifying and elimination play-offs - the team losing the elimination play-off is out of play-offs. The winners of the elimination play-off meet the losers of the qualifying play-off in the second round - the semi-finals.

The team losing the elimination semi-final is out, while the winners go through the third round - the preliminary final - where they play the losing team in the qualifying semi-final. The winners of the qualifying semi-final go straight through to the play-off final where they play the winners of the preliminary final.

=== Team bracket ===
Qualifying & elimination play-offs
3	North Wales Crusaders	12
4	Doncaster	26
5	Rochdale Hornets	38
6	Oldham	24

Semi-finals
2	Swinton Lions	32
Doncaster	12
North Wales Crusaders	20
Rochdale Hornets	36

Preliminary final
Doncaster	52
Rochdale Hornets	20

Promotion play-off final
Swinton Lions	16
Doncaster	10

=== Week 1 ===
Qualifying play-off

11 September 2022
14:30

North Wales Crusaders	12 – 26	Doncaster
Tries: Massem, Johnson; Goals: Johnson (2)		Tries: Tali (2), Johnston, Corion, Smeaton; Goals: Robinson (3)

Eirias Stadium
Attendance: 345
Referee: N. Bennett

Elimination play-off

11 September 2022
13:00

Rochdale Hornets	38 – 24	Oldham
Tries: Forster, Bannion (2), Tyrer, McNally, Aspey, Chase; Goals: Tyrer (5)		Tries: Hartley (2), Restall, Morgan; Goals: Ridyard (4)

Spotland Stadium
Attendance: 735
Referee: A. Moore

=== Week 2 ===
Qualifying semi-final

18 September 2022
15:00

Swinton Lions	32 – 12	Doncaster
Tries: Lloyd, Hansen, Butt, Cox, Brogan; Goals: Abram (6)		Tries: Holdstock, Johnston; Goals: Boas (2)

Heywood Road
Attendance: 781
Referee: A. Moore

Elimination semi-final

17 September 2022
17:30

North Wales Crusaders	20 – 36	Rochdale Hornets
Tries: Ah Van, Rodden (2), Fletcher; Goals: Johnson (2)		Tries: Calland, Nixon (2), Rogers, McNally, Aspey, Brewin; Goals: Tyrer (4)

Eirias Stadium
Attendance: 307
Referee: J. Vella

=== Week 3 ===
Preliminary final

24 September 2022
15:00

Doncaster	52 – 20	Rochdale Hornets
Tries: Storey (2), Tali (2), Smeaton, Boas, Ruan, Corton, Johnston; Goals: Robinson (8)	report	Tries: Tyrer, Niton, O"Keefe (2); Goals: Tyrer (2)

Eco-Power Stadium
Attendance: 628
Referee: T. Grant

=== Week 4 ===
Play-off final

2 October 2022
15:00

Swinton Lions	16 – 10	Doncaster
Tries: Case, Cox, Hansen; Goals: Abram (2)	report	Tries: Tali, Halliday; Goals: Robinson

Heywood Road
Attendance: 1,086
Referee: J. Vella
