= 2023 RFL League 1 results =

Rugby league competition results

The fixture list for the 2023 League One season was issued on 13 November 2022. The regular season comprised 22 rounds to be followed by the play-offs. The season commenced on 18 February and ended on 17 September 2023.

All times are UK local time (UTC±00:00 until 26 March 2023, UTC+01:00 thereafter).

== Regular season ==
=== Round 1 ===
Betfred League One: round one
| Home | Score | Away | Match Information |
| Home | Score | Away | Date and Time | Venue | Referee | Attendance |
|---|---|---|---|---|---|---|
| London Skolars | 16–58 | Workington Town | 18 February 2023, 15:00 | New River Stadium | M. Rossleigh | 264 |
| North Wales Crusaders | 18–38 | Dewsbury Rams | 19 February 2023, 14:30 | DCBL Stadium (Note: Fixture moved to DCBL Stadium, Widnes due to unavailability of Eirias Stadium.) | S. Mikalauskas | 300 |
| Doncaster | 18–16 | Hunslet | 19 February 2023, 15:00 | Keepmoat Stadium | B. Milligan | 1,251 |
| Midlands Hurricanes | 40–6 | Cornwall | 19 February 2023, 15:00 | Alexander Stadium | K. Moore | 453 |

=== Round 2 ===
Betfred League One: round two
| Home | Score | Away | Match Information |
| Home | Score | Away | Date and Time | Venue | Referee | Attendance |
|---|---|---|---|---|---|---|
| Rochdale Hornets | 10–20 | Doncaster | 5 March 2023, 13:00 | Spotland Stadium | M. Rossleigh | 391 |
| Dewsbury Rams | 50–10 | Midlands Hurricanes | 5 March 2023, 15:00 | Crown Flatt | L. Bland | 771 |
| Hunslet | 22–8 | North Wales Crusaders | 5 March 2023, 15:00 | South Leeds Stadium | K. Moore | 504 |
| Oldham | 62–18 | London Skolars | 5 March 2023, 15:00 | Whitebank Stadium | B. Milligan | 525 |

=== Round 3 ===
Betfred League One: round three
| Home | Score | Away | Match Information |
| Home | Score | Away | Date and Time | Venue | Referee | Attendance |
|---|---|---|---|---|---|---|
| London Skolars | 22–66 | Hunslet | 18 March 2023, 15:00 | New River Stadium | L. Bland | 186 |
| Doncaster | 30–16 | North Wales Crusaders | 19 March 2023, 15:00 | Keepmoat Stadium | K. Moore | 837 |
| Midlands Hurricanes | 24–32 | Rochdale Hornets | 19 March 2023, 15:00 | Alexander Stadium | A. Sweet | 384 |
| Workington Town | 6–25 | Dewsbury Rams | 19 March 2023, 15:00 | Derwent Park | B. Milligan | 650 |

=== Round 4 ===
Betfred League One: round four
| Home | Score | Away | Match Information |
| Home | Score | Away | Date and Time | Venue | Referee | Attendance |
|---|---|---|---|---|---|---|
| Rochdale Hornets | 4–52 | Dewsbury Rams | 26 March 2023, 13:00 | Spotland Stadium | B. Milligan | 573 |
| North Wales Crusaders | 4–18 | Oldham | 26 March 2023, 14:30 | Eirias Stadium | M. Lynn | 387 |
| Cornwall | 35–10 | London Skolars | 26 March 2023, 15:00 | The Memorial Ground | R. Cox | 862 |
| Midlands Hurricanes | 28–38 | Workington Town | 26 March 2023, 15:00 | Alexander Stadium | L. Bland | 324 |

=== Round 5 ===
Betfred League One: round five
| Home | Score | Away | Match Information |
| Home | Score | Away | Date and Time | Venue | Referee | Attendance |
|---|---|---|---|---|---|---|
| Dewsbury Rams | 12–6 | Hunslet | 7 April 2023, 15:00 | Crown Flatt | K. Moore | 1,565 |
| Oldham | 56–16 | Rochdale Hornets | 7 April 2023, 15:00 | Whitebank Stadium | A. Sweet | 824 |
| Workington Town | 20–18 | North Wales Crusaders | 7 April 2023, 15:00 | Derwent Park | M. Lynn | 623 |
| Cornwall | 16–48 | Doncaster | 8 April 2023, 13:00 | The Memorial Ground | J. Jones | 928 |

=== Round 6 ===
Betfred League One: round six
| Home | Score | Away | Match Information |
| Home | Score | Away | Date and Time | Venue | Referee | Attendance |
|---|---|---|---|---|---|---|
| Rochdale Hornets | 28–29 | Workington Town | 16 April 2023, 13:00 | Spotland Stadium | K. Moore | 588 |
| Dewsbury Rams | 78–10 | Cornwall | 16 April 2023, 15:00 | Crown Flatt | M. Lynn | 876 |
| Doncaster | 26–22 | Oldham | 16 April 2023, 15:00 | Keepmoat Stadium | M. Rossleigh | 1,308 |
| Hunslet | 48–6 | Midlands Hurricanes | 16 April 2023, 15:00 | South Leeds Stadium | B. Milligan | 358 |

=== Round 7 ===
Betfred League One: round seven
| Home | Score | Away | Match Information |
| Home | Score | Away | Date and Time | Venue | Referee | Attendance |
|---|---|---|---|---|---|---|
| Rochdale Hornets | 32–18 | North Wales Crusaders | 7 May 2023, 13:00 | Spotland Stadium | R. Cox | 564 |
| Doncaster | 46–6 | Workington Town | 7 May 2023, 15:00 | Keepmoat Stadium | N. Bennett | 1,255 |
| Midlands Hurricanes | 38–20 | London Skolars | 7 May 2023, 15:00 | Alexander Stadium | A. Sweet | 239 |
| Oldham | 36–16 | Cornwall | 7 May 2023, 15:00 | Whitebank Stadium | K. Moore | 437 |

=== Round 8 ===
Betfred League One: round eight
| Home | Score | Away | Match Information |
| Home | Score | Away | Date and Time | Venue | Referee | Attendance |
|---|---|---|---|---|---|---|
| Cornwall | 10–54 | Hunslet | 13 May 2023, 13:00 | The Memorial Ground | M. Lynn | 727 |
| London Skolars | 24–28 | Rochdale Hornets | 13 May 2023, 15:00 | New River Stadium | M. Rossleigh | 209 |
| Dewsbury Rams | 26–12 | Doncaster | 14 May 2023, 15:00 | Crown Flatt | B. Milligan | 2,015 |
| Workington Town | 18–28 | Oldham | 14 May 2023, 15:00 | Derwent Park | K. Moore | 1,010 |

=== Round 9 ===
Betfred League One: round nine
| Home | Score | Away | Match Information |
| Home | Score | Away | Date and Time | Venue | Referee | Attendance |
|---|---|---|---|---|---|---|
| Rochdale Hornets | 62–6 | Cornwall | 21 May 2023, 15:00 | Spotland Stadium | B. Milligan | 496 |
| Midlands Hurricanes | 14–42 | North Wales Crusaders | 21 May 2023, 15:00 | Alexander Stadium | K. Moore | 496 |
| Doncaster | 60–30 | London Skolars | 21 May 2023, 15:00 | Keepmoat Stadium | L. Bland | 1,158 |
| Hunslet | 22–18 | Workington Town | 21 May 2023, 15:00 | South Leeds Stadium | A. Sweet | 347 |
| Oldham | 26–26 | Dewsbury Rams | 21 May 2023, 15:00 | Whitebank Stadium | M. Rossleigh | 1,295 |

=== Round 10 ===
Betfred League One: round ten
| Home | Score | Away | Match Information |
| Home | Score | Away | Date and Time | Venue | Referee | Attendance |
|---|---|---|---|---|---|---|
| Cornwall | 10–42 | North Wales Crusaders | 28 May 2023, 15:00 | The Memorial Ground | A. Sweet | 1,008 |
| Dewsbury Rams | 52–6 | London Skolars | 28 May 2023, 15:00 | Crown Flatt | K. Moore | 825 |
| Hunslet | 36–18 | Rochdale Hornets | 28 May 2023, 15:00 | South Leeds Stadium | M. Rossleigh | 481 |
| Midlands Hurricanes | 16–50 | Oldham | 28 May 2023, 15:00 | Alexander Stadium | B. Milligan | 342 |

=== Round 11 ===
Betfred League One: round eleven
| Home | Score | Away | Match Information |
| Home | Score | Away | Date and Time | Venue | Referee | Attendance |
|---|---|---|---|---|---|---|
| London Skolars | 6–60 | North Wales Crusaders | 3 June 2023, 15:00 | New River Stadium | W. Gilder | 215 |
| Workington Town | 54–0 | Cornwall | 4 June 2023, 14:30 | Derwent Park | E. Burrow | 603 |
| Midlands Hurricanes | 26–54 | Doncaster | 4 June 2023, 15:00 | Alexander Stadium | F. Lincoln | 273 |
| Oldham | 40–20 | Hunslet | 4 June 2023, 15:00 | Whitebank Stadium | L. Bland | 361 |

=== Round 12 ===
Betfred League One: round twelve
| Home | Score | Away | Match Information |
| Home | Score | Away | Date and Time | Venue | Referee | Attendance |
|---|---|---|---|---|---|---|
| London Skolars | 14–62 | Oldham | 10 June 2023, 15:00 | New River Stadium | A. Sweet | 338 |
| Cornwall | 6–30 | Dewsbury Rams | 11 June 2023, 15:00 | The Memorial Ground | W. Gilder | 1,164 |
| Doncaster | 42–20 | Rochdale Hornets | 11 June 2023, 15:00 | Keepmoat Stadium | B. Milligan | 1,191 |
| North Wales Crusaders | 24–32 | Workington Town | 16 July 2023, 15:00 (Note: Match postponed from 11 June due to overrunning pitch renewal work at the Eirias Stadium.) | Hare Lane, Chester (Note: Ongoing pitch works at the Eirias Stadium required the match to be played elsewhere.) | B. Milligan | 340 |

=== Round 13 ===
Betfred League One: round thirteen
| Home | Score | Away | Match Information |
| Home | Score | Away | Date and Time | Venue | Referee | Attendance |
|---|---|---|---|---|---|---|
| Dewsbury Rams | 42–0 | Rochdale Hornets | 16 June 2023, 19:30 | Crown Flatt | K. Moore | 811 |
| North Wales Crusaders | 62–24 | Midlands Hurricanes | 18 June 2023; 14:30 | Pant Carw (Note: Moved due to ongoing pitch works at Eirias Stadium.) | L. Bland | 205 |
| Hunslet | 36–6 | Cornwall | 18 June 2023, 15:00 | South Leeds Stadium | A. Sweet | 433 |
| Oldham | 22–28 | Doncaster | 18 June 2023, 15:00 | Whitebank Stadium | N. Bennett | 647 |
| Workington Town | 34–6 | London Skolars | 18 June 2023, 15:00 | Derwent Park | B. Milligan | 496 |

=== Round 14 ===
Betfred League One: round fourteen
| Home | Score | Away | Match Information |
| Home | Score | Away | Date and Time | Venue | Referee | Attendance |
|---|---|---|---|---|---|---|
| Dewsbury Rams | 20–8 | Oldham | 23 June 2023, 19:30 | Crown Flatt | B. Milligan | 1,650 |
| North Wales Crusaders | 20–30 | Hunslet | 25 June 2023, 14:30 | Hare Lane, Chester | N. Bennett | 363 |
| Workington Town | 60–10 | Midlands Hurricanes | 25 June 2023, 15:00 | Derwent Park | R. Cox | 843 |
| London Skolars | 0–60 | Doncaster | 11 August 2023, 19:00 | New River Stadium | M. Rossleigh | 509 |

=== Round 15 ===
Betfred League One: round fifteen
| Home | Score | Away | Match Information |
| Home | Score | Away | Date and Time | Venue | Referee | Attendance |
|---|---|---|---|---|---|---|
| North Wales Crusaders | 32–24 | Rochdale Hornets | 2 July 2023, 14:30 | Hare Lane, Chester | A. Sweet | 375 |
| Hunslet | 28–8 | Doncaster | 2 July 2023, 15:00 | South Leeds Stadium | M. Rossleigh | 767 |
| Midlands Hurricanes | 23–28 | Dewsbury Rams | 2 July 2023, 15:00 | Alexander Stadium | L. Bland | 423 |
| Oldham | 40–24 | Workington Town | 23 August 2023, 19:30 (Note: Match postponed on 2 July as Workington unable to reach Oldham due to motorway closure) | Boundary Park | R. Cox | 1,283 |

=== Round 16 ===
Betfred League One: round sixteen
| Home | Score | Away | Match Information |
| Home | Score | Away | Date and Time | Venue | Referee | Attendance |
|---|---|---|---|---|---|---|
| London Skolars | 14–30 | Cornwall | 8 July 2023, 14:30 | New River Stadium | M. Lynn | 281 |
| Midlands Hurricanes | 22–54 | Hunslet | 9 July 2023, 15:00 | Haslams Lane, Derby | A. Sweet | 547 |
| Oldham | 37–24 | North Wales Crusaders | 9 July 2023, 15:00 | Whitebank Stadium | B. Milligan | 734 |
| Workington Town | 40–12 | Rochdale Hornets | 9 July 2023, 15:00 | Derwent Park | K. Moore | 1,337 |

=== Round 17 ===
Betfred League One: round seventeen
| Home | Score | Away | Match Information |
| Home | Score | Away | Date and Time | Venue | Referee | Attendance |
|---|---|---|---|---|---|---|
| London Skolars | 16–48 | Dewsbury Rams | 29 April 2023, 14:30 | New River Stadium | L. Bland | 236 |
| Cornwall | 28–8 | Midlands Hurricanes | 16 July 2023, 13:00 | The Memorial Ground | L. Bland | 957 |
| North Wales Crusaders | 24–32 | Workington Town | 16 July 2023, 14:30 | Hare Lane, Chester | B. Milligan | 340 |
| Hunslet | 21–8 | Oldham | 16 July 2023, 15:00 | South Leeds Stadium | K. Moore | 726 |

=== Round 18 ===
Betfred League One: round eighteen
| Home | Score | Away | Match Information |
| Home | Score | Away | Date and Time | Venue | Referee | Attendance |
|---|---|---|---|---|---|---|
| Rochdale Hornets | 48–0 | London Skolars | N/A (Note: Original fixture on 23 July postponed due to bad weather. Match was subsequently rescheduled for 23 August but was further postponed on 21 August when Skolars informed the RFL they would be unable to fulfil the fixture. On 25 August, a statement from the RFL announced, that the match had been awarded as an automatic 48–0 win to Rochdale.) |
| Cornwall | 16–34 | Workington Town | 23 July 2023, 15:00 | The Memorial Ground | R. Cox | 1,204 |
| Dewsbury Rams | 18–4 | North Wales Crusaders | 23 July 2023, 15:00 | Crown Flatt | K. Moore | 807 |
| Doncaster | 10–41 | Midlands Hurricanes | 23 July 2023, 15:00 | Eco-Power Stadium | M. Lynn | 864 |

=== Round 19 ===
Betfred League One: round nineteen
| Home | Score | Away | Match Information |
| Home | Score | Away | Date and Time | Venue | Referee | Attendance |
|---|---|---|---|---|---|---|
| Rochdale Hornets | 37–22 | Midlands Hurricanes | 30 July 2023, 13:00 | Spotland Stadium | B. Milligan | 334 |
| North Wales Crusaders | 38–40 | Cornwall | 30 July 2023, 14:30 | Tynewydd Field | F. Lincoln | 649 |
| Hunslet | 16–14 | Dewsbury Rams | 30 July 2023, 15:00 | South Leeds Stadium | N. Bennett | 1,064 |
| Workington Town | 19–22 | Doncaster | 30 July 2023, 15:00 | Derwent Park | A. Sweet | 1,074 |

=== Round 20 ===
Betfred League One: round twenty
| Home | Score | Away | Match Information |
| Home | Score | Away | Date and Time | Venue | Referee | Attendance |
|---|---|---|---|---|---|---|
| London Skolars | 18–38 | Midlands Hurricanes | 5 August 2023, 15:00 | New River Stadium | L. Bland | 204 |
| Rochdale Hornets | 22–35 | Hunslet | 6 August 2023, 13:00 | Spotland Stadium | R. Cox | 344 |
| Cornwall | 4–56 | Oldham | 6 August 2023, 15:00 | The Memorial Ground | A. Belafonte | 891 |
| Dewsbury Rams | 38–8 | Workington Town | 6 August 2023, 15:00 | Crown Flatt | K. Moore | 1,579 |
| North Wales Crusaders | 28–22 | Doncaster | 6 August 2023, 15:00 | Hare Lane, Chester | B. Milligan | 531 |

=== Round 21 ===
Betfred League One: round twenty-one
| Home | Score | Away | Match Information |
| Home | Score | Away | Date and Time | Venue | Referee | Attendance |
|---|---|---|---|---|---|---|
| Rochdale Hornets | 20–24 | Oldham | 20 August 2023, 13:00 | Spotland Stadium | B. Milligan | 1,386 |
| Doncaster | 60–0 | Cornwall | 20 August 2023, 15:00 | Keepmoat Stadium | A. Sweet | 1,072 |
| Hunslet | 56–14 | London Skolars | 20 August 2023, 15:00 | South Leeds Stadium | M. Lynn | 484 |

=== Round 22 ===
Betfred League One: round twenty-two
| Home | Score | Away | Match Information |
| Home | Score | Away | Date and Time | Venue | Referee | Attendance |
|---|---|---|---|---|---|---|
| Cornwall | 18–12 | Rochdale Hornets | 27 August 2023, 13:00 | The Memorial Ground | W. Gilder | 1,281 |
| North Wales Crusaders | 62–20 | London Skolars | 27 August 2023, 14:30 | Eirias Stadium | A. Sweet | 495 |
| Doncaster | 36–26 | Dewsbury Rams | 27 August 2023, 15:00 | Keepmoat Stadium | B. Milligan | 1,064 |
| Oldham | 10–18 | Midlands Hurricanes | 27 August 2023, 15:00 | Whitebank Stadium | M. Lynn | 472 |
| Workington Town | 18–6 | Hunslet | 27 August 2023, 15:00 | Derwent Park | K. Moore | 803 |

== Play-offs ==
=== Team bracket ===
Qualifying & elimination play-offs
3 | Doncaster | 36
4 | Oldham | 0
5 | Workington Town | 10
6 | North Wales Crusaders | 26

Semi-finals
2 | Hunslet | 14
3 | Doncaster | 26
4 | Oldham | 12
6 | North Wales Crusaders | 13

Preliminary final
2 | Hunslet | 18
6 | North Wales Crusaders | 25

Promotion play-off final
3 | Doncaster | 18
6 | North Wales Crusaders | 6

=== Week 1: Elimination & qualifying play-offs ===
Qualifying play-off

3 September 2023
15:00 BST (UTC+01:00)

| Doncaster | 36–0 | Oldham |
|---|---|---|
| | Report |

Eco-Power Stadium
Attendance: 615
Referee: Kevin Moore

Elimination play-off

3 September 2023
15:00 BST (UTC+01:00)

| Workington Town | 10–26 | North Wales Crusaders |
|---|---|---|
| | Report |

Derwent Park
Attendance: 611
Referee: Ryan Cox

=== Week 2: Semi-finals ===
Qualifying semi-final

10 September 2023
18:00 BST (UTC+01:00)

| Hunslet | 14–26 | Doncaster |
|---|---|---|
| | Report |

South Leeds Stadium
Attendance: 897
Referee: Nick Bennett

Elimination semi-final

10 September 2023
15:00 BST (UTC+01:00)

| Oldham | 12–13 | North Wales Crusaders |
|---|---|---|
| | Report |

Boundary Park
Attendance: 836
Referee: Kevin Moore

=== Week 3: Preliminary final ===
17 September 2023
15:00 BST (UTC+01:00)

| Hunslet | 18–25 | North Wales Crusaders |
|---|---|---|
| | Report |

South Leeds Stadium
Attendance: 626
Referee: Matt Rossleigh

=== Week 4: Promotion play-off final ===
24 September 2023
15:00 BST (UTC+01:00)

| Doncaster | 18–6 | North Wales Crusaders |
|---|---|---|
| Tries: Fonua, Mcconnell, Smeaton; Goals: Robinson (3/4) | Report | Tries: Hughes; Goals: Hayes (1/1) |

Eco-Power Stadium, Doncaster
Attendance: 2,549
Referee: Nick Bennett
