= Daniel Walton =

English rugby league footballer and powerlifter

Personal information
- Full name: Daniel Walton

Playing information
Club
Years	Team	Pld	T	G	FG	P
2007–2010	York City Knights	5	1	0	0	4
2011	Coventry Bears	6	3	0	0	12
	Total	11	4	0	0	16

Daniel Walton is a former professional rugby league footballer and powerlifter. He played rugby league in the late 2000s and early 2010s for York City Knights and Coventry Bears. He competed in powerlifting in the late 2010’s.

== Rugby League Career ==
=== York City Knights ===
Walton was named academy player of the year in 2008. He made his first team debut the following season against Hunslet Hawks. Walton signed a one-year contract extension with the club for the 2010 season.

=== Coventry Bears ===
Walton signed for the Coventry Bears midway through the 2011 season but was unable to help them secure a play-off spot.

== Powerlifting ==
Walton competed in the 105 kg weight class at the 2018 All England Powerlifting Championships after achieving qualification the previous year. He won the Yorkshire and North East seniors title in 2019 for the 120 kg class.
