= 2024 RFL League One =

2024 rugby league competition in the United Kingdom

- League: League One
- Duration: March – October 2024
- Teams: 9
- Matches played: 96
- Points scored: 5,090
- Highest attendance: 2,681 Oldham v Workington (1 September 2024)

2024
- Champions: Oldham
- Top point-scorer: Jack Miller (Keighley) (190 points)
- Top try-scorer: Cian Tyrer (Oldham) (30 tries)

The 2024 RFL League One was a professional rugby league football competition played in the United Kingdom and the third tier of the sport for Rugby Football League (RFL) affiliated clubs. The sponsors for the league were the bookmakers, Betfred and the league continued to be known as the Betfred League One.

Nine teams competed in the league playing 20 matches each over 23 rounds in the regular season with the team finishing first being declared the champions and the teams finishing second to fifth taking part in the play-offs.

Oldham won the title and automatic promotion to the 2025 Championship with two matches to spare. The play-off final was won by Hunslet earning the club a chance to travel to Swinton Lions in the Championship play-off match, where the Yorkshire club also won promotion.

== Team changes ==
The league had decreased in size from 2023 with nine teams competing, down from 10 in 2023. At the end of the 2023 season London Skolars announced that the club was reverting to amateur status and was resigning from the professional ranks. Dewsbury Rams and Doncaster were promoted to the Championship and were replaced by Keighley Cougars and Newcastle Thunder who finished bottom of the Championship. When the fixture list was issued on 3 December 2023 there remained some doubt about Newcastle's participation as that club also announced they were withdrawing from the league at the end of the 2023 season. However an attempt to revive the club started in October 2023 and an application to rejoin the league made. Newcastle's application to rejoin the RFL was approved on 22 December when it was also confirmed that the club will continue to play at Kingston Park. In May 2024 Newcastle announced that the club would be playing all remaining games at Gateshead International Stadium.

== Structure changes ==
Until this season promotion and relegation was on a 2-up, 2-down basis between the Championship and League One but was subject to a review of the league structure.

In March 2024 the RFL completed the review and announced that the first steps will be taken to equalise the number of teams in the Championship and League One at 12 each by the start of the 2026 season. At the end of 2024 the Championship would reduce in size to 13 for 2025 while League One would increase to 10 in 2025. This means that at the end of the 2024 season, only the League 1 champions would automatically be promoted to the Championship while the bottom two teams in the Championship would be relegated. The team that won the League One play-offs would play the team finishing third-bottom in the Championship for the 13th place in the 2025 Championship.

As there were only nine teams in the division for 2024, playing the other clubs home and away only would give each team just 16 fixtures. To increase the number of fixtures for each team and make the season more financially sustainable, each club had four additional fixtures, known as loop fixtures, two home and two away.

== Rule changes ==
A number of changes have been introduced for 2024.

The "six again" rule was amended so that set restarts would only be awarded if the ball is in the defending team's half of the field. Infringements in the attacking team's half resulted in a penalty to the attacking team.

The use of the 18th man was allowed after two players (reduced from three) had failed head impact assessments or a player was unable to continue through injury (not just a head injury) resulting from foul play where the opposing player was sin-binned or sent-off. The use of the green card by the referee ordering injured players off the field for treatment was discontinued.

A team awarded a penalty at a scrum had the option to reset the scrum instead of taking the penalty.

For disciplinary processes a category of "reckless tackle" was introduced.

== Clubs ==
=== Stadiums and locations ===
Locations of the 2024 RFL League One teams

Team	Location	Stadium	Capacity
Cornwall	Penryn	The Memorial Ground	4,000
Hunslet	Leeds	South Leeds Stadium	4,000
Keighley Cougars	Keighley	Cougar Park	7,800
Midlands Hurricanes	Birmingham	Alexander Stadium	2,000
Newcastle Thunder	Newcastle upon Tyne	Kingston Park	10,200
Newcastle Thunder	Newcastle upon Tyne	Gateshead International Stadium	11,800
North Wales Crusaders	Colwyn Bay	Eirias Stadium	5,500
Oldham	Oldham	Boundary Park	13,513
Rochdale Hornets	Rochdale	Spotland Stadium	10,249
Workington Town	Workington	Derwent Park	10,000

== Table ==
Pos	Team	Pld	W	D	L	PF	PA	PD	Pts	Qualification
1	Oldham	20	19	0	1	885	144	+741	38	Champions
2	Keighley Cougars	20	15	1	4	694	352	+342	31	Advance to qualifying semi-final
3	Rochdale Hornets	20	13	1	6	687	432	+255	27	Advance to qualifying play-off
4	Hunslet	20	13	0	7	522	534	−12	26	Advance to qualifying play-off
5	Midlands Hurricanes	20	9	0	11	566	424	+142	18	Advance to elimination play-off
6	Workington Town	20	9	0	11	504	549	−45	18	Advance to elimination play-off
7	North Wales Crusaders	20	8	0	12	464	472	−8	16	
8	Cornwall	20	3	0	17	306	787	−481	6	
9	Newcastle Thunder	20	0	0	20	190	1124	−934	0	

== Play-offs ==
=== Team bracket ===
Qualifying & elimination play-offs
3	Rochdale Hornets	30
4	Hunslet	18
5	Midlands Hurricanes	24
6	Workington Town	22

Semi-finals
2	Keighley Cougars	26
3	Rochdale Hornets	22
4	Hunslet	18
5	Midlands Hurricanes	14

Preliminary final
3	Rochdale Hornets	26
4	Hunslet	46

Play-off final
2	Keighley Cougars	6
4	Hunslet	20

=== Week 1: Qualifying and elimination play-offs ===
Qualifying play-off

15 September 2024
15:00

Rochdale Hornets	30–18	Hunslet
Tries: Juma, Else (2), Andrade, Forber, Harrop; Goals: Harman (3)		Tries: Ferreira, Goddard, Render (2); Goals: Beharrell

Spotland Stadium
Attendance: 826
Referee: K. Moore

Elimination play-off

15 September 2024
15:00

Midlands Hurricanes	24–22	Workington Town
Tries: Hewitt, Luke-Kirby, Chrimes; Goals: Sweeting (6)		Tries: Burns (2), Brennan, Bickerdike; Goals: Forber (3)

Alexander Stadium
Referee: M. Lynn

=== Week 2: Semi-finals ===
Qualifying semi-final

22 September 2024
15:00

Keighley Cougars	26–22	Rochdale Hornets
Tries: Lanskey, Lynam, Miller, Ioane; Goals: Miller (5/6)		Tries: Roberts, Andrade, Forber, Harrop; Goals: Harman (3/4)

Cougar Park
Attendance: 1,037
Referee: B. Thaler

Elimination semi-final

22 September 2024
15:00

Hunslet	18–14	Midlands Hurricanes
Tries: Ferreira, Delaney, Render; Goals: Beharrell (3/4)		Tries: Clavering, Barcoe; Goals: Sweeting (3/3)

South Leeds Stadium
Attendance: 474
Referee: R. Cox

=== Week 3: Preliminary final ===
Played between the losing team of the qualifying semi-final and the winning team of the elimination semi-final. The match was played at the ground of the team that finished higher during the regular season.

Preliminary final

29 September 2024
15:00

Rochdale Hornets	26–46	Hunslet
Tries: Derbyshire, Nelmes, Andrade, Taulapapa, Forber; Goals: Harman (3/5)		Tries: Flanagan (2), Berry, Turner, Render (2), Ferreira, Wood; Goals: Beharrell (7/8)

Spotland Stadium
Attendance: 428
Referee: S. Mikalauskas

=== Week 4: Play-off final ===
Played between the winning team of the qualifying semi-final and the winning team of the preliminary final. The match was played at the ground of the team that finished higher during the regular season.

Play-off final

6 October 2024
15:00

Keighley Cougars	6–20	Hunslet
Tries: Flanagan; Goals: Miller (1/1)		Tries: Wood, Turner, Render; Goals: Beharrell (4/6)

Cougar Park
Attendance: 1,057
Referee: C. Worsley

=== Promotion play-off ===
The Championship promotion play-off match between the winners of the play-off final and the team finishing 12th in the Championship was played on 13 October 2024.

Championship play-off

13 October 2024
19:30

Swinton Lions	20–22	Hunslet
Tries: Williams, Cox, Wood, Vaughan; Goals: Abram (2/4)		Tries: Turner, Berry, Flanagan, Render; Goals: Beharrell (3/4)

Heywood Road
Attendance: 885
Referee: J. Vella
