= Alan Robinson =

Alan Robinson may refer to:

- Alan Robinson (Canadian politician)
- Alan Robinson (Northern Irish politician)
- Alan Robinson (rugby league)
- Alan Rook Robinson, Canadian policeman
- Alan Robinson, creator of the British children's television series School of Roars

== See also ==
- John Alan Robinson, British and American philosopher, mathematician, and early computer scientist
- Allen Robinson (born 1993), American football player
