= 2025 RFL League One =

2025 rugby league competition in the United Kingdom

- League: League One
- Duration: 23 February – 7 September 2025
- Teams: 11 (10 from 2 April)
- Matches played: 90
- Points scored: 4,077
- Highest attendance: 2,310 (Workington v Whitehaven, 18 April)

2025
- Champions: North Wales Crusaders
- Biggest home win: 74–0 (North Wales Crusaders v Newcastle Thunder, 18 May)
- Biggest away win: 6–72 (North Wales Crusaders at Newcastle Thunder, 27 July)
- Top point-scorer(s): Jake Carter (Workington Town), 161 points
- Top try-scorer(s): 21: Sam Wilde (North Wales Crusaders) & Luke Forber (Rochdale Hornets)
- Withdrew: Cornwall

The 2025 RFL League One was a professional rugby league football competition played in the United Kingdom and the third tier of the sport for Rugby Football League (RFL) affiliated clubs. The sponsors for the league were the bookmakers, Betfred and the league continued to be known as the Betfred League One.

Eleven teams were due to compete in the league playing 20 matches each over 22 rounds in the regular season. On 2 April, after four rounds had been played, Cornwall announced that the club were withdrawing from the league with immediate effect and would not be fulfilling their remaining fixtures.

Cornwall's membership of the RFL was terminated on 2 May and the club's three results for 2025 expunged. The competition continued as a 10 club league with each team playing 18 games.

The season was the 22nd and final season of the third-tier competition as League One and the Championship merged at the end of the season.

== Team changes ==
The league had increased in size from 2024 with 11 teams competing, up from nine in 2024. At the end of the 2024 season Dewsbury Rams, Swinton Lions and Whitehaven were relegated from the Championship replacing Oldham and Hunslet who won promotion. Goole Vikings were admitted to the league, the first new team since Cornwall in 2022.

== Structure changes ==
Until 2023 promotion and relegation was on a 2-up, 2-down basis between the Championship and League One but was subject to a review of the league structure.

In March 2024 the RFL completed the review and announced that the first steps will be taken to equalise the number of teams in the Championship and League One at 12 each by the start of the 2026 season. Following the 2-up, 3-down system in 2024, 2025 was to have seen the return of the Super 8s format with the top four teams in League One meeting the bottom four teams in the Championship to decide which division those clubs will play in for 2026.

However, following the decision to expand Super League from 12 to 14 clubs from 2026, the decision was taken on 27 August 2025 to merge the Championship and League One competitions for 2026. The Super 8s therefore became redundant and were cancelled.

== Rule changes ==
Three rule changes were brought in for 2025:

- Kick chasers will only be offside if they are influencing the play rather than automatically being offside for being within 10 metres.
- Drop-outs that fail to travel 10 metres or go out on the full result in a play-the-ball rather than a penalty.
- Attacking players as well as defending players can be green-carded if play has to be stopped due to an injury. Previously only defending players could be green-carded.

== Clubs ==
=== Stadiums and locations ===
Locations of the 2025 RFL League One teams

Team	Location	Stadium	Capacity
Cornwall (until 2 April)	Penryn	The Memorial Ground	4,000
Dewsbury Rams	Dewsbury	Crown Flatt	5,100
Goole Vikings	Goole	Victoria Pleasure Grounds	3,000
Keighley Cougars	Keighley	Cougar Park	7,800
Midlands Hurricanes	Birmingham	Alexander Stadium	18,000
Newcastle Thunder	Swalwell	Crow Trees Ground	2,000
North Wales Crusaders	Colwyn Bay	Eirias Stadium	5,500
Rochdale Hornets	Rochdale	Spotland Stadium	10,249
Swinton Lions	Sale	Heywood Road	3,387
Whitehaven	Whitehaven	Recreation Ground	7,500
Workington Town	Workington	Derwent Park	10,000

== Table ==
Pos	Team	Pld	W	D	L	PF	PA	PD	Pts	Qualification
1	North Wales Crusaders	18	14	0	4	568	236	+332	28	Champions
2	Workington Town	18	13	1	4	502	270	+232	27	
3	Swinton Lions	18	12	0	6	385	328	+57	24	
4	Dewsbury Rams	18	10	1	7	464	342	+122	21	
5	Midlands Hurricanes	18	9	1	8	432	333	+99	19	
6	Rochdale Hornets	18	9	0	9	529	335	+194	18	
7	Goole Vikings	18	8	0	10	353	399	−46	16	
8	Whitehaven	18	7	1	10	384	420	−36	15	
9	Keighley Cougars	18	6	0	12	362	422	−60	12	
10	Newcastle Thunder	18	0	0	18	98	992	−894	0	
