= 2023 RFL League 1 =

2023 rugby league competition in the United Kingdom

2023 RFL League One
- League: League One
- Duration: 18 February 2023 – 27 August 2023
- Teams: 10
- Matches played: 185
- Points scored: 4,986
- Highest attendance: 2,549 Doncaster v North Wales Crusaders (24 September)
- Lowest attendance: 186 London Skolars v Hunslet (18 March)
- Average attendance: 719
- Attendance: 69,820

2023
- Champions: Dewsbury Rams
- Biggest home win: Dewsbury Rams 78–10 Cornwall (16 April)
- Biggest away win: London Skolars 0–60 Doncaster (11 August)
- Top point-scorer: Connor Robinson (Doncaster) (228)
- Top try-scorer: Sam Smeaton (Doncaster) (21)
- Resignation: London Skolars

The 2023 RFL League One was a professional rugby league football competition played in the United Kingdom and the third tier of the sport for Rugby Football League (RFL) affiliated clubs. The sponsors for the league were the bookmakers, Betfred and the league continued to be known as the Betfred League One.

The title and the automatic promotion place was won by Dewsbury Rams. Also promoted were Doncaster who won through the play-offs to win the play-off final 18–6 against North Wales Crusaders.

Top try scorer was Doncaster's Sam Smeaton with 21. Top points-scorer was Connor Robinson, also of Doncaster with 228 points (9 tries and 96 goals).

== Teams ==
The number of teams in League One was scheduled to remain at 11, with Keighley and Swinton (who were promoted in 2022), being replaced by Dewsbury Rams and Workington Town, (the teams relegated from the Championship), but on 22 December 2022, the RFL announced that West Wales Raiders had withdrawn from the league, and that the season would proceed with just 10 clubs.

In January 2023, Midlands Hurricanes confirmed that the club would be moving from the Portway Stadium, to use the Alexander Stadium in Perry Park, Birmingham.

Towards the end of the season, Oldham announced that the club's planned relocation to Boundary Park would be brought forward from 2024. On 22 August, the club played their penultimate home game of the regular season, at Boundary Park (the club's first match there since 2009).

On 15 September 2023, London Skolars issued a statement to say they would be withdrawing from League One, ahead of the 2024 season.

=== Stadiums and locations ===
Locations of the 2023 RFL League 1 teams

Team	Location	Stadium	Capacity
Cornwall RLFC	Penryn, Cornwall	The Memorial Ground	4,000
Dewsbury Rams	Dewsbury	Crown Flatt	5,100
Doncaster	Doncaster	Eco-Power Stadium	15,231
Hunslet	Leeds	South Leeds Stadium	4,000
London Skolars	Haringey, London	New River Stadium	2,000
Midlands Hurricanes	Birmingham	Alexander Stadium	2,000
North Wales Crusaders	Colwyn Bay	Eirias Stadium	5,500
Oldham	Oldham	Whitebank Stadium (2 matches at Boundary Park)	1,500 (13,513)
Rochdale Hornets	Rochdale	Spotland Stadium	10,249
Workington Town	Workington	Derwent Park	10,000

== Rule changes ==
Changes in the operational rules were announced on 1 February 2023.

On-field, the main change is that teams awarded a penalty for an offence at a scrum can now kick for goal. Previously such penalties were differential precluding the team from kicking for goal. The green card process has been clarified so that if the referee calls "time off" for a player to receive medical attention, the player must leave the pitch for two minutes. Teams will be allowed to name an 18th player (fifth interchange player) in the squad who can play if three or more players are withdrawn due to failing a head injury assessment (HIA).

Off-field the graduated return to play process that applies after a player has suffered a concussion will be a minimum of 12 days (up from 11 in 2022).

Changes have also been made to the disciplinary process where the periods of suspension for the various grade of offences have been reduced but the use of fines increased.

== Fixtures and results ==
With the withdrawal of West Wales Raiders, consideration was given to adding loop fixture to the season but a meeting of the 10 clubs decided against this and to proceed with an 18-match season with the dates where clubs would have played West Wales as byes.

The round 18 match between Rochdale Hornets and London Skolars was forfeited by the Skolars. Originally scheduled for 23 July, the fixture was postponed due to bad weather. It was subsequently rescheduled again for 23 August, but was further postponed on 21 August, when Skolars informed the RFL they would be unable to fulfil the fixture. On 24 August, the RFL announced that Rochdale had been awarded the fixture as an automatic 48-0 win under the league's operational rules.

== Table ==
Pos	Team	Pld	W	D	L	PF	PA	PD	Pts	Qualification
1	Dewsbury Rams	18	15	1	2	623	215	+408	31	Promoted to the Championship
2	Hunslet	18	14	0	4	572	284	+288	28	Advance to qualifying semi-final
3	Doncaster	18	14	0	4	602	352	+250	28	Advance to qualifying play-off
4	Oldham	18	12	1	5	605	333	+272	25	Advance to qualifying play-off
5	Workington Town	18	11	0	7	516	385	+131	22	Advance to elimination play-off
6	North Wales Crusaders	18	7	0	11	520	437	+83	14	Advance to elimination play-off
7	Rochdale Hornets	18	6	0	12	425	520	−95	12	
8	Midlands Hurricanes	18	5	0	13	408	647	−239	10	
9	Cornwall	18	5	0	13	257	712	−455	10	
10	London Skolars	18	0	0	18	254	897	−643	0	

== Play-offs ==
=== Team bracket ===
Qualifying & elimination play-offs
3	Doncaster	36
4	Oldham	0
5	Workington Town	10
6	North Wales Crusaders	26

Semi-finals
2	Hunslet	14
3	Doncaster	26
4	Oldham	12
6	North Wales Crusaders	13

Preliminary final
2	Hunslet	18
6	North Wales Crusaders	25

Promotion play-off final
3	Doncaster	18
6	North Wales Crusaders	6

=== Week 1: Elimination & qualifying play-offs ===
Qualifying play-off

3 September 2023
15:00 BST (UTC+01:00)

Doncaster	36–0	Oldham
	Report

Eco-Power Stadium
Attendance: 615
Referee: Kevin Moore

Elimination play-off

3 September 2023
15:00 BST (UTC+01:00)

Workington Town	10–26	North Wales Crusaders
	Report

Derwent Park
Attendance: 611
Referee: Ryan Cox

=== Week 2: Semi-finals ===
Qualifying semi-final

10 September 2023
18:00 BST (UTC+01:00)

Hunslet	14–26	Doncaster
	Report

South Leeds Stadium
Attendance: 897
Referee: Nick Bennett

Elimination semi-final

10 September 2023
15:00 BST (UTC+01:00)

Oldham	12–13	North Wales Crusaders
	Report

Boundary Park
Attendance: 836
Referee: Kevin Moore

=== Week 3: Preliminary final ===
17 September 2023
15:00 BST (UTC+01:00)

Hunslet	18–25	North Wales Crusaders
	Report

South Leeds Stadium
Attendance: 626
Referee: Matt Rossleigh

=== Week 4: Promotion play-off final ===
24 September 2023
15:00 BST (UTC+01:00)

Doncaster	18–6	North Wales Crusaders
Tries: Fonua, Mcconnell, Smeaton; Goals: Robinson (3/4)	Report	Tries: Hughes; Goals: Hayes (1/1)

Eco-Power Stadium, Doncaster
Attendance: 2,549
Referee: Nick Bennett
