= Jack Aldous =

English rugby league footballer

Personal information
- Full name: Jack Aldous
- Born: 3 April 1991 (age 34) Bradford, England

Playing information
- Position: Prop, loose forward
Club
Years	Team	Pld	T	G	FG	P
2011	Hull FC	1	0	0	0	0
2011(loan)	→ York City Knights	3	0	0	0	0
2012–16	York City Knights	125	12	0	0	48
2017–19	Newcastle Thunder	68	3	0	0	12
2020	Hunslet	4	1	0	0	4
2025–	Goole Vikings	19	0	0	0	0
	Total	220	16	0	0	64

Jack Aldous (born 3 April 1991) is an English professional rugby league footballer who plays for the Goole Vikings in the Betfred Championship.

== Playing career ==
=== Newcastle Thunder ===
He previously played for the York City Knights until signing for Newcastle Thunder in October 2016.

=== Hunslet RLFC ===
On 26 December 2019 it was announced that Aldous had signed for Hunslet. He signed a new one-year deal with the club for the 2021 season, but made no further appearances for Hunslet due to work commitments.

=== Goole Vikings ===
On 21 October 2024 it was reported that he had signed for Goole Vikings in the RFL League 1.
