= Tyler Dickinson =

English rugby league footballer

Personal information
- Born: 18 August 1996 (age 29) Halifax, West Yorkshire, England
- Height: 6 ft 1 in (1.85 m)
- Weight: 16 st 6 lb (104 kg)

Playing information
- Position: Prop
Club
Years	Team	Pld	T	G	FG	P
2016–18	Huddersfield Giants	19	1	0	0	4
2015(loan)	→ Halifax	4	0	0	0	0
2015(loan)	→ Keighley Cougars	9	1	0	0	4
2016(loan)	→ Keighley Cougars	1	0	0	0	0
2016(loan)	→ Oldham	18	0	0	0	0
2016(loan)	→ Newcastle Thunder	1	0	0	0	0
2017(loan)	→ Oldham	5	0	0	0	0
2018(loan)	→ Workington Town	7	3	0	0	12
2019–20	Batley Bulldogs	16	2	0	0	8
2021–25	Sheffield Eagles	18	5	0	0	20
2026–	Midlands Hurricanes	0	0	0	0	0
	Total	98	12	0	0	48
- Source: As of 17 October 2025

Tyler Dickinson (born 18 August 1996) is an English professional rugby league footballer who plays as a prop for the Midlands Hurricanes in the Championship.

== Background ==
Dickinson was born in Halifax, West Yorkshire, England.

== Club career ==
=== Huddersfield Giants ===
He spent the majority of his Huddersfield Giants career out on loan to Halifax and Oldham in the Championship, and the Keighley Cougars, Newcastle Thunder and Workington Town in League 1.

=== Batley Bulldogs ===
In November 2018, it was reported that Dickinson had joined Batley Bulldogs in the Championship.

=== Sheffield Eagles ===
On 10 August 2020, it was announced that he had signed for the Sheffield Eagles. In the 2021 season, Dickinson was named by the Eagles as their Player of the Year and signed a new 2-year contract to remain with the club.

On 2 October 2025 it was reported that he had left Sheffield Eagles

=== Midlands Hurricanes ===
On 17 October 2025, it was announced that he had signed for the Midlands Hurricanes on a 1-year deal.
