= Goole Vikings =

English professional rugby league club, based in Yorkshire, England

Goole Vikings RLFC

Club information
- Full name: Goole Vikings Rugby League Football Club
- Nickname: The Seaporters
- Colours: Black and red
- Founded: 2018; 8 years ago
- Website: goolevikings.co.uk

Current details
- Ground: Victoria Pleasure Grounds Carter Street, Goole
- CEO: James Clark
- Chairman: Mark Richardson
- Coach: Brett Ferres
- Competition: Championship
- 2026 season: 14th
- Current season

Uniforms
Home colours	Away colours

The Goole Vikings are a semi-professional rugby league club from Goole, East Riding of Yorkshire, England who compete in the Championship, the second tier of the British rugby league system. The club previously competed in the amateur Yorkshire Men's League before joining League One in 2025, following a successful application.

== History ==
=== Formation ===
Goole Vikings was founded in 2018 as an amateur club in the Yorkshire Men's League, part of the fifth tier of the British rugby league system. The club is considered the successor club to Goole RLFC which disbanded in 1902.

The club's first ever professional game was a pre-season friendly on Tuesday, 14 January 2025 in a 46-6 defeat to Featherstone Rovers at the Millennium Stadium, with substitute winger Callum Shaw scoring Goole's only try. One week later, in the club's first ever competitive professional match they had a stunning 10-17 victory knocking out a depleted London Broncos side from the Challenge Cup 3rd round, played at the home of Rosslyn Park F.C. in Roehampton, with tries from Tom Halliday, Thomas Minns and Mackenzie Harman.

=== League 1 ===
Following the withdrawal of London Skolars from League 1 at the end of the 2023 season, the Rugby Football League (RFL) asked for applications for a replacement club for the 2025 season. Goole Vikings stated their intent to apply on 27 May 2024, and were placed on a three team shortlist along with Anglian Vipers (East Rugby League; Division 5) and Bedford Tigers (Southern Conference League; Division 4) on 3 July.

On 18 September 2024, the RFL announced Goole's application had been successful and the club would join League 1 in 2025.

On 1 October 2024, the club announced they had signed Scott Taylor as head coach, and Tom Halliday as their first professional player signing. In January 2025, Goole pulled off a huge upset in the second round of the 2025 Challenge Cup defeating London 17-10.

== 2027 squad ==
2027 Goole Vikings squad
First team squad			Coaching staff
(England) Harry Aldous – LF, SR; (England) Jack Arnold – PR; (England) Brad Bullock – PR; (England) Joe Burton – WG, CE; (England) Oli Burton – HK; (England) Tyler Craig – CE, PR; (England) Nathan Cullen – SR; (England) Alfie Dean – SR, CE; (Scotland) Tom Gray – FB, WG; (England) Josh Guzdek – FB, CE	(England) Owen Haldenby – PR; (England) Tom Halliday – WG; (England) Mackenzie Harman – SO, HK; (England) Henry Hope – WG; (England) Zach McGowan – SO, SH, HK; (England) Harry Medlicott – PR; (England) Oli Morgan – HK; (England) Leroy Ncube – WG; (England) Alfie Petty – PR; (England) Morgan Punchard – SO, SH	(England) Callum Rutland – SH, SO, HK; (England) Callum Shaw – WG; (England) Zeus Silk – PR, LF, SR; (England) Jack Smith – PR, SR, LF; (England) Ali Swyer – HK; (Jamaica) Keenen Tomlinson – CE, SR; (England) Shane Tuohey – FB, SO, SH, HK; (England) Jon Turner – PR; (England) Liam Watts – PR; (England) Eligh Wilkinson – WG	Head coach: Brett Ferres; Assistant coaches: Richard Whiting; Kevin Marshall; Legend: (c) Captain(s); (vc) Vice-captain(s)

== 2027 transfers ==
=== Gains ===
Player	From	Contract	Date
(England) Zeus Silk	Midlands Hurricanes	2 years	30 September 2026
(England) Nathan Cullen	Sarina Crocodiles	1 year	5 October 2026
(England) Joe Burton	Batley Bulldogs	1 year	8 October 2026
(England) Oli Burton	Keighley Cougars	1 year	8 October 2026
(England) Alfie Dean	Keighley Cougars	1 year	11 October 2026
(England) Owen Haldenby	Salford	1 year	12 October 2026
(England) Alfie Petty	Hull KR	1 year	15 October 2026
(England) Joe Thompson	Hull KR	1 year	20 October 2026
(England) Henry Hope	Hull KR	2 years	23 October 2026
(England) Jon Turner	Hull FC	1 year	17 October 2026
(England) Ali Swyer	Hull FC	1 year	29 October 2026
(England) Zach McGowan	Castleford Tigers	1 year	26 October 2026
(England) Eligh Wilkinson	West Hull ARLFC	1 year	2 November 2026
(Scotland) Tom Gray	Skirlaugh ARLFC	1 year	14 November 2026

=== Losses ===
Player	To	Contract	Date
(England) Ben Hodder			1 September 2026
(Australia) Cooper Howlett			1 September 2026
(England) Jack Miller			1 September 2026
(England) Baily Tait			1 September 2026
(England) Jeylan Hodgson	Huddersfield Giants	2 years	7 September 2026
(England) Connor Barley	Hull FC	1 year	17 September 2026
(England) Nick Staveley	Batley Bulldogs	1 year	19 September 2026

=== Retired ===
Player	Date
(England) Jack Aldous	1 September 2026
(England) Jack Coventry	1 September 2026
(Germany) Ben Dent	1 September 2026
(England) Brett Ferres	1 September 2026

== Head coaches ==
- Scott Taylor (2024–2026)
- Brett Ferres (2027–present)

== Seasons ==
Season	League										Challenge Cup	Other competitions	
Season	Division	P	W	D	L	F	A	Pts	Pos	Play-offs	Challenge Cup	Other competitions	
2019	Yorkshire Men's League Division 2	17	6	11	0	288	593	11	6th	Unknown	Did not participate		
2020	Yorkshire Men's League Division 2	League abandoned due to the COVID-19 pandemic								Unknown	Did not participate		
2021	Yorkshire Men's League Division 2	15	1	14	0	120	494	-2	9th	Unknown	Did not participate		
2022	Yorkshire Men's League Division 5	13	6	7	0	188	217	7	6th	Unknown	Did not participate		
2023	Yorkshire Men's League Division 4	14	8	5	1	432	268	17	2nd	Unknown	Did not participate		
2024	Yorkshire Men's League Division 4	13	7	5	1	334	347	15	3rd (Note: Promotion to League One by application)	Unknown	Did not participate		
2025	League One	18	8	0	10	353	399	16	7th (Note: Promotion due to the merging League One and the Championship)	Play-offs cancelled	R3	1895 Cup	R1
2026	Championship	24	8	0	16	532	867	16	14th	Did not qualify	R4	1895 Cup	QF
