= Josh Guzdek =

English rugby league footballer

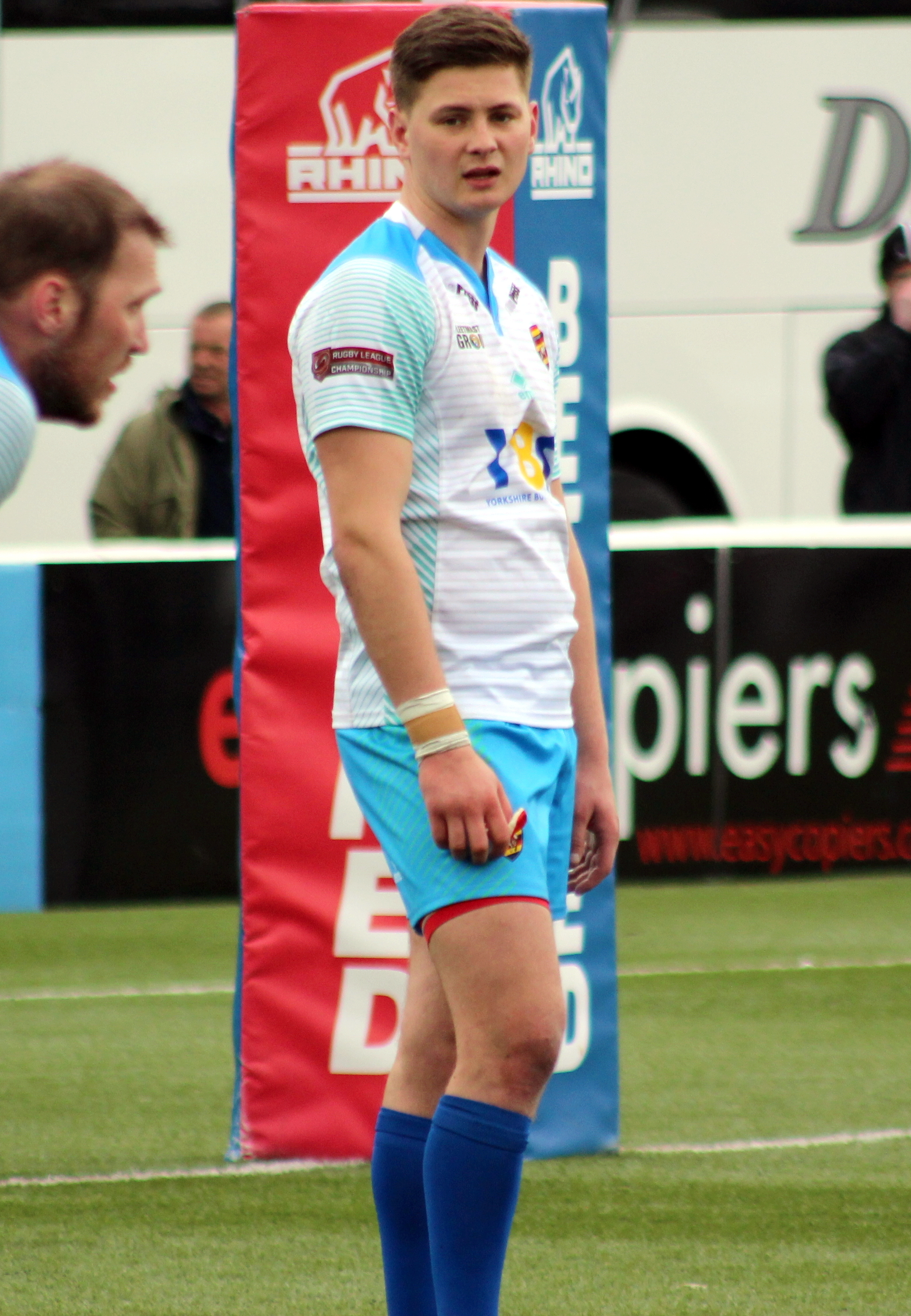

Personal information
- Full name: Joshua Liam Guzdek
- Born: 23 April 1995 (age 31)
- Height: 6 ft 0 in (1.83 m)
- Weight: 14 st 2 lb (90 kg)

Playing information
- Position: Fullback
Club
Years	Team	Pld	T	G	FG	P
2013–15	Hull Kingston Rovers	2	1	0	0	4
2015(loan)	→ Keighley Cougars	7	6	0	0	24
2015(loan)	→ Newcastle Thunder	2	0	0	0	0
2016–18	Dewsbury Rams	81	27	0	0	108
2019–23	Sheffield Eagles	71	14	51	0	158
2023(loan)	→ London Skolars	2	0	0	0	0
2023(loan)	→ Doncaster	11	2	0	0	8
2024	Doncaster	19	6	0	0	24
2025–	Goole Vikings	36	9	0	0	36
	Total	231	65	51	0	362
- Source: As of 8 September 2026

Josh Guzdek (born 23 April 1995) is a professional rugby league footballer who plays as a fullback for the Goole Vikings in the Betfred Championship.

He previously played for Hull Kingston Rovers, Dewsbury Rams, Sheffield Eagles, London Skolars and Doncaster.

== Playing career ==
=== Hull KR ===
A former Skirlaugh Bulls player, he was with Hull KR since the age of 13 and progressed through the academy system. In 2013, he made 1 appearance for Hull KR against London Broncos, and scored just 30 seconds into the game with his first touch of the ball. He was a member of Hull KR first team.

=== Dewsbury Rams ===
In October 2015 he joined the Dewbury Rams.

=== Sheffield Eagles ===
Guzdek joined the Sheffield Eagles on a two-year deal in October 2018.

He helped the Eagles to win the inaugural 1895 Cup as they defeated Widnes Vikings 36–18 in the final.

=== London Skolars (loan) ===
In May 2023, Guzdek joined the London Skolars on a two-week loan deal.

=== Doncaster RLFC (loan) ===
On 7 June 2023 it was reported that he had joined Doncaster RLFC on loan. Guzdek made ten appearances for Doncaster in the 2023 season as the team earned promotion from RFL League 1 to the Championship.

=== Doncaster RLFC (permanent deal) ===
On 18 November 2023, Guzdek signed a permanent deal to remain with Doncaster for the 2024 season.

=== Goole Vikings ===
On 3 October 2024, it was reported that he had signed for Goole in the RFL League 1
