= Alan Robinson (rugby league) =

Irish rugby league player

Personal information
- Full name: Alan Robinson

Playing information
Club
Years	Team	Pld	T	G	FG	P
2000	Limoux Grizzlies
1998–≥06	Coventry Bears
	Total	0	0	0	0	0
Representative
Years	Team	Pld	T	G	FG	P
2006	Ireland	2

Alan Robinson is a former professional rugby league footballer who played in the 2000s. He played at representative level for Ireland, and at club level for Limoux Grizzlies and Coventry Bears.

== Playing career ==
=== International honours ===
Alan Robinson won caps for Ireland while at Coventry Bears 2006 2-caps (World Cup Qualifiers sub vs Russia and Lebanon) He has also played for Ireland at A team level: 1996, 2002, 2003, 2004 Versus USA, 2006–08 in the Amateur Four Nations. He also played in two Student Rugby League World Cups in 1996 and 1999 and was the Great Britain and Ireland students captain in 1997.

=== Club career ===
He signed professional for French team Limoux Grizzlies in 2000 where he played one season before returning to England in 2001 to Coventry Bears the club which he founded in 1998.

=== Coaching career ===
He coached at Coventry Bears in Amateur Midlands Leagues and the National Conference Leagues. He also coached at International level for Ireland during the 2000s for Ireland Students and Ireland Wolfhounds.
