= Victoria Pleasure Grounds =

Sports stadium in Goole, England

- Interactive map of Victoria Pleasure Grounds
- Location: Carter Street, Goole, East Riding of Yorkshire
- Coordinates: 53°42′11″N 0°52′51″W
- Owner: East Riding of Yorkshire Council
- Operator: Goole Town Council
- Capacity: 3,000
- Surface: Artificial turf

Construction
- Built: 1888
- Opened: 1888

Tenants
- Football; Goole Town F.C. (1900–1996); Goole A.F.C. (1997–present); Rugby League; Goole 1888–1902 (rugby union until 1898); Goole Vikings (2018-present)

The Victoria Pleasure Grounds are a multi-use sports stadium in Goole, East Riding of Yorkshire. The grounds are home to Goole's two semi-professional sports teams, football team Goole A.F.C. and rugby league team Goole Vikings.

== History ==
A football ground on the site, was first used by the town's rugby team in September 1883.

In September 1888 the ground was named the Victoria Pleasure Grounds and as well as football pitches, supported cricket matches and athletic events.

With the demise of the rugby section of the football and athletics club in 1902, the principle tenants of the ground became football clubs Goole Town F.C. (then known as Goole Amateurs) and Goole Thursday.

In 1925 the freehold of the ground was purchased by the Carter's brewery of Knottingley who wished to build an inn on the site. No inn was ever built as the Goole justices repeatedly refused any application for an alcohol licence.

Frustrated by this behaviour, the brewery decided to sell the site in 1932 for a minimum price of £2,000, after notifying the tenants that the lease was not to be renewed. Rejecting an offer of £1,900 from the athletics club, the brewery sold the ground to Barnetts, a Hull building firm. Local opinion was that the ground should be retained for sporting use and in 1933, Goole Urban District Council purchased the majority of the site from Barnetts for £2,000 allowing sport to continue.

Due to changes in local government ownership of the ground passed from Goole Urban District Council through Goole Town Council and Boothferry Borough Council to the current owners, East Riding of Yorkshire Council, although it is leased to Goole Town Council.

== Facilities ==
The grounds grass pitch was replaced with an artificial turf surface in 2025. The athletics track is being relocated within the stadium so that it no longer surrounds the main pitch. A new pavilion is also being built with work due to complete in 2026.

== Occupants ==
=== Rugby ===
- Goole Football and Athletics Club 1889–1902 (the athletics club remained tenants for many years after)
- Goole Vikings 2018–present

=== Football ===
- Goole Town F.C. 1903–1996
- Goole A.F.C. 1997–present
