= Whitebank Stadium =

Rugby and soccer stadium in Oldham, England

- Vestacare Stadium
- Interactive map of Whitebank Stadium
- Former names: Whitebank Stadium
- Location: White Bank Road; Limeside; Oldham; OL8 3JH
- Coordinates: 53°31′6.75″N 2°7′18.29″W
- Capacity: 1,500
- Surface: Artificial surface

Construction
- Built: 1992
- Opened: 1992
- Renovated: 2010, 2017
- Expanded: 2010

Tenants
- Football; Oldham Boro F.C. (1992–2012); Rochdale Town F.C. (2004–2005); Avro F.C. (2017–present); Golcar United F.C. (2020) Rugby League; Oldham R.L.F.C. (2010–2015, 2018–2019, 2022–23)

Whitebank Stadium, currently also known as the Vestacare Stadium for sponsorship purposes, is a rugby league and association football stadium which forms part of Limeside in Oldham, England. It is the home stadium of Avro F.C.

In 2017, following a sponsorship from Vestacare, a service provider for people with learning disabilities, the stadium was renamed Vestacare Stadium.

== Structure ==
Over 350 seats were acquired from Wilderspool Stadium in Warrington and were installed by volunteers. Timber used in the construction of the new Wembley Stadium was also reused in the stadium developments in 2010.

On 13 September 2016, plans were announced for further improvements to the stadium site. It is envisaged that the planning application will seek consent for levelling and upgrading the main pitch into a new artificial grass surface. In additional to a range of ancillary work, an area of land to the North of the existing social club would also be upgraded to form an additional grass, training pitch.

== Association football ==
Oldham Boro F.C. (formerly Oldham Dew and Oldham Town) played at Whitebank Stadium from 1992 until 2012 after previously playing at Nordens Road, Chadderton since the mid 1960s. They became Oldham Boro in 2009. From the summer of 2012 until 2014 the club shared Alder House with Atherton Collieries F.C. The ground is approximately 19 miles away from their traditional home. The club has subsequently folded after a final season at Mossley.

Castleton Gabriels (now Rochdale Town F.C.) played part of the 2004–05 season at Whitebank during refurbishment work at their Castleton Sports Centre ground.

In September 2016 Manchester Football League club Avro announced plans for the use of Whitebank Stadium, enabling the club to apply for higher level football upon completion of ground improvements. The move from their Lancaster Club, Failsworth home to Whitebank was completed in April 2017.

In 2020 the ground also hosted home games for Golcar United, who are based in Huddersfield due to their pitch being unplayable.

Prior to 1992 the ground had been in use for amateur sports since at least the early 1930s.

== Rugby league ==
Oldham left their historic home of Watersheddings in 1997. The club went on to use eight venues in 12 years; only one of which was in Oldham. Oldham were told they would no longer be able to use Oldham Athletic's Boundary Park in November 2009. The club went to Oldham Council for help.

The 2010 season saw a transition with the five home games were played out of town at Park Lane, Whitefield, home of Sedgley Park R.U.F.C. Their first game at Whitebank took place on 9 May 2010 against York - the first time Oldham had played on their own ground in Oldham borough since 1997. The rest of the home games were also played at Whitebank. Home crowds were nearly double compared to Park Lane. Following promotion, for the 2016 and 2017 seasons Oldham played their first team games at Bower Fold, Stalybridge, as their Whitebank home didn't meet the grading requirements for Championship level rugby.

In September 2016 it was announced that Oldham had surrendered the lease on the stadium, although the club continue to run operations from Whitebank Stadium. Following relegation, Oldham returned to the Whitebank Stadium for the commencement of the 2018 season. Promotion in 2019 once again saw Oldham play at Bower Fold for the 2020 and 2021 seasons. Further relegation in 2021 allowed matches to be once again played at Whitebank from 2022. In March 2023, Oldham announced that they would move to Boundary Park from the 2024 season.
