= Cornwall R.L.F.C. =

Defunct English rugby league club, based in Penryn, Cornwall

Cornwall RLFC

Club information
- Full name: Cornwall RLFC
- Nickname: The Choughs
- Colours: Black and Gold
- Founded: 2021; 5 years ago
- Exited: 2025; 1 year ago

Former details
- Ground: The Memorial Ground, Penryn (4,000)

Cornwall RLFC was a British professional rugby league team based in Penryn, Cornwall, England. The club competed in the third-tier RFL League One from 2022 to 2025, when the club withdrew from the league and ceased operations mid-season.

== History ==
=== 2019–20: Ottawa Aces ===
Original Ottawa bid logo

It was first announced in March 2019 that a consortium from Canada, led by Toronto Wolfpack founder Eric Perez, had purchased the Rugby Football League membership of club Hemel Stags and planned to relocate their licence to Canada.

More due diligence took place during 2019 to decide if the club was ready to join League 1 for the 2020 season along with the New York City Rugby League, however at the end of July 2019 it was announced that the club would not enter the league in 2020 and would instead work towards joining the league in 2021.

On 9 March 2020, Ottawa announced they would push back their debut season and enter League 1 in 2021. However, due to travel restrictions between Canada and the United Kingdom resulting from the COVID-19 pandemic, the Aces and the RFL agreed to defer entry to the League 1 another year again, until 2022.

Come March 2021, it was announced Ottawa would compete in the newly founded North America Rugby League along with the Toronto Wolfpack, however Perez said the club still expected to play in League 1 in 2022 and suggested the club could play as a 2nd team in the NARL.

On 22 October 2021, it was announced that Ottawa Aces would relocate back to the United Kingdom permanently due the "unstable operating environment" of running a club in the British leagues from Canada during a pandemic. They would also withdraw from the NARL effectively disbanding as the Ottawa Aces.

=== 2021–25: Relocation to Cornwall ===
On 2 November 2021 the club was officially relocated to Penryn, Cornwall and rebranded as Cornwall RLFC. The club were allocated a place in League 1, the third tier of the British rugby league system.

On 8 December 2021 it was announced that Neil Kelly had been appointed as head coach, and Anthony Mullally, a former Super League winner with Leeds Rhinos and Ireland international was the first player signing. On 25 June 2022, Cornwall earned their first competitive win defeating West Wales Raiders 22–4. It was their only win of the season. in October 2022, Mike Abbot took over as head coach having previously been the assistant to Neil Kelly.

=== 2024–25: Cornish ownership and financial trouble ===
On 27 November 2024, the consortium led by Eric Perez sold the club to Gloucestershire-based businessman Kenny Stone. Stone aimed to make the RFL League 1 side a community-based club. However, on 2 April 2025 it was announced that Cornwall RLFC had folded due to financial issues, which Stone attributed to an unstable American investment market. Their last match was a 78–6 defeat by Whitehaven at Penryn - a record home loss.

== Coaches ==
- Neil Kelly 2021–2022
- Mike Abbot 2022–2025

== Seasons ==
Season	League									Play-offs	Challenge Cup	RFL 1895 Cup	Ref.
Season	Division	P	W	D	L	F	A	Pts	Pos	Play-offs	Challenge Cup	RFL 1895 Cup	Ref.
2022	League 1	20	1	0	19	276	864	2	10th	Did not qualify	Did not participate	Did not participate	
2023	League 1	18	5	0	13	257	712	10	9th	Did not qualify	R2	Did not qualify	
2024	League One	20	3	0	17	306	787	6	8th	Did not qualify	R3	Did not participate	
2025	League One	Did not complete season									R2	PR1	

== See also ==
- Rugby league in Cornwall
- Cornish Rebels
- Rugby Football League expansion
