= Heywood Road =

Rugby stadium in Greater Manchester, England

- Interactive map of Heywood Road
- Location: Heywood Road; Sale; Trafford; M33 3WB
- Coordinates: 53°24′58″N 2°19′17″W
- Capacity: 3,387 (2017)
- Surface: grass

Construction
- Opened: 1905

Tenants
- Sale F.C. (1905-); Sale Sharks (1996-2003); Sale Jets; Swinton RLFC (2016-); Sale Sharks Women (2020-)

Heywood Road (known for sponsorship reasons as the Morson Stadium) is a multi-use rugby stadium in Sale, Greater Manchester, England, which has been the home ground of rugby union side Sale F.C. since 1905. It was the home ground of spin-off professional club Sale Sharks until they moved to Edgeley Park, Stockport, in 2003. Sale Sharks Women use the stadium as their primary home ground in Premiership Women's Rugby.

From the 2016 season, it has also been home to Swinton Lions who play in RFL Championship. The move of Swinton to the ground meant that the General Safety Certificate had to be renewed. In September 2016, a report by Trafford Council to the Safety at Sports Grounds Sub-Committee recommended that Heywood Road's capacity be reduced from 5,678 to 3,387 for safety reasons.

The stadium is sponsored by Morson Group.
