= John Charles Centre for Sport =

Sports complex in Leeds, England

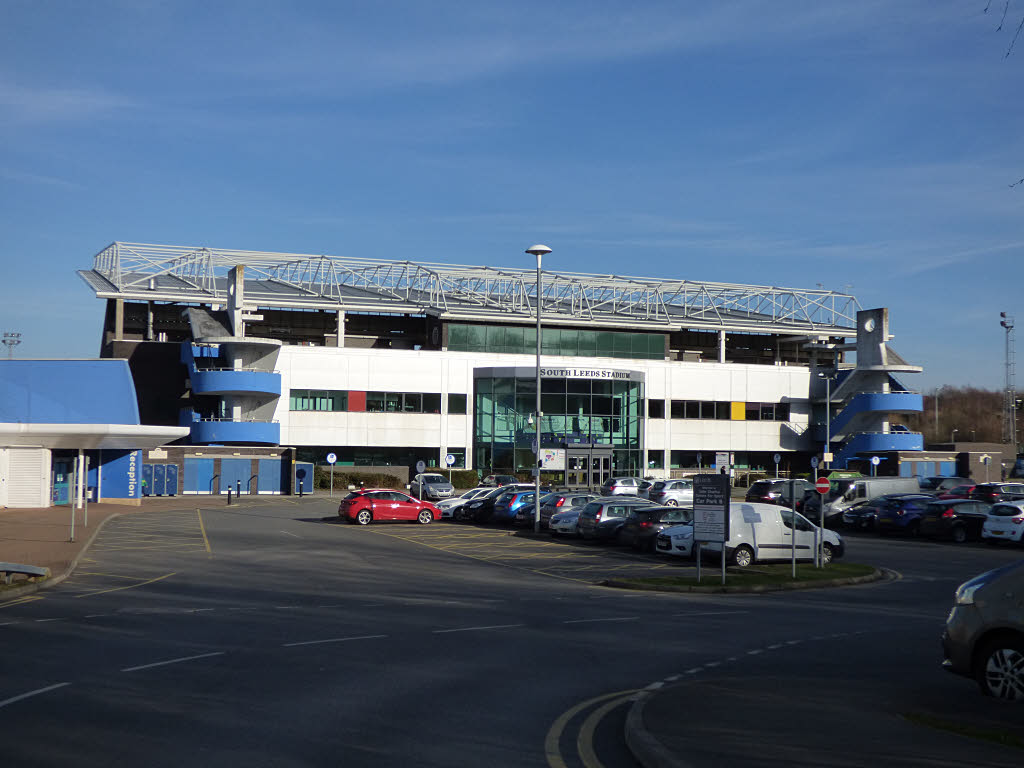
- Grandstand at the South Leeds Stadium
- Interactive map of John Charles Centre for Sport
- Full name: The John Charles Centre for Sport
- Location: Beeston, West Yorkshire
- Coordinates: 53°45′52″N 1°32′28″W
- Capacity: 3,450

Construction
- Built: 1996
- Opened: 1996

Tenants
- Hunslet (1996–); Yorkshire Rams (2016–); South Leeds F.C. (2024–)

The John Charles Centre for Sport is a multi-purpose sports facility in South Leeds, West Yorkshire, England. It consists of the South Leeds Stadium (a rugby league, football, and athletics stadium), an aquatics centre, indoor athletics centre, and tennis centre. In 2007 the complex was renamed in honour of John Charles (1931–2004), the former Leeds United, Juventus and Wales footballer.

The complex is located to the south of Leeds city centre roughly on the border of Beeston, Belle Isle and Hunslet. The sports centre opened in 1996, and the Aquatics Centre opening in 2007.

The stadium has been used by Leeds United for reserve matches, and since November 1995 by rugby league club Hunslet. It is the principal athletics stadium in the Leeds area and is the home of Leeds City Athletic Club. South Leeds F.C. (formerly Middleton FC) have used the stadium since 2024 enabling the club to be promoted to the Northern Counties East League.

== Layout ==
=== Stadium ===
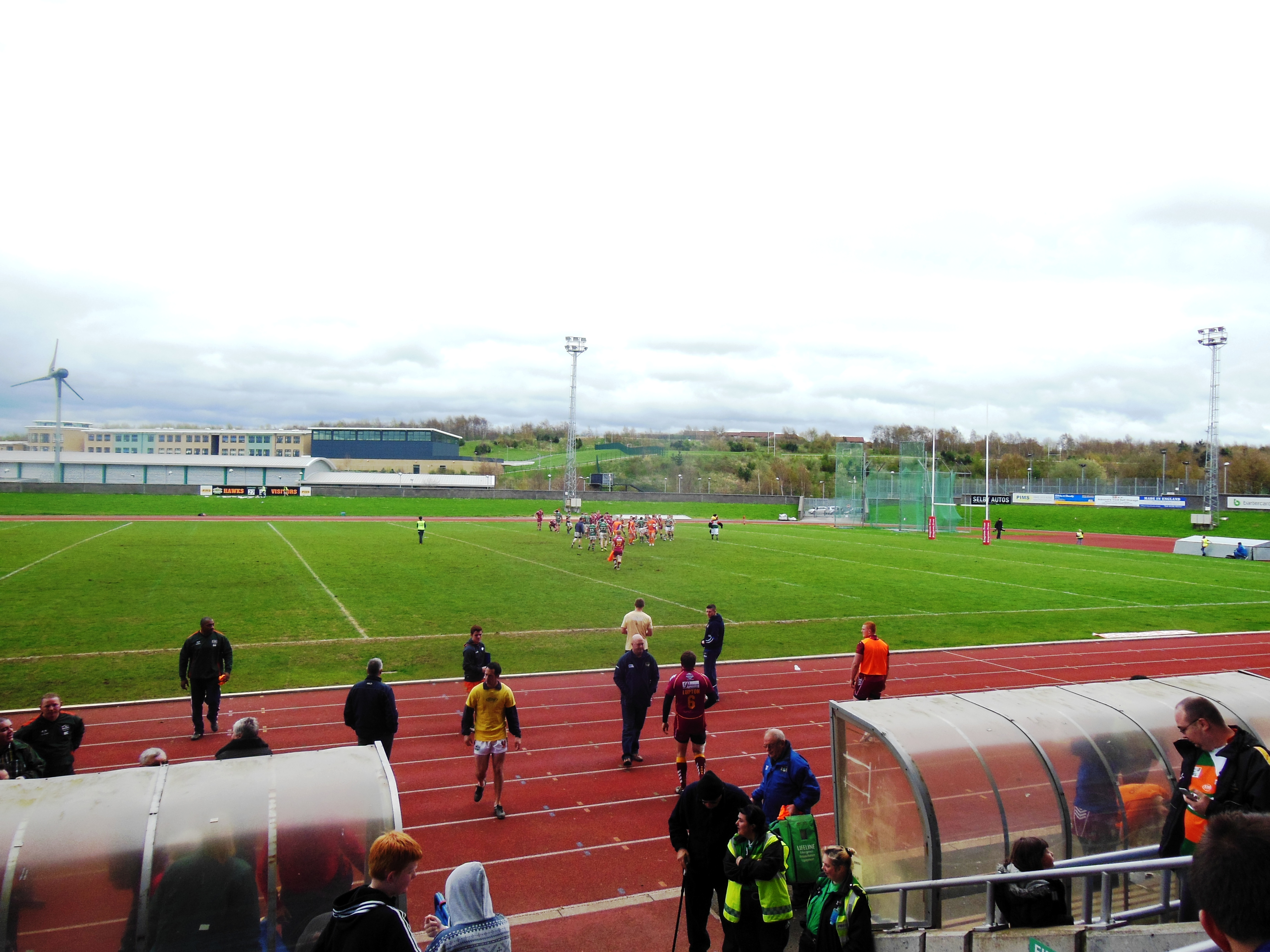
The main stand

The stadium was the first part of the sports centre to be built. It has a two tier stand at the west end of the ground which has a capacity of 4,000. It also houses the changing rooms, corporate boxes and the Phoenix Bar. The stadium has a running track as well as a pitch and is mainly used for rugby league and athletics.

=== Aquatics Centre ===
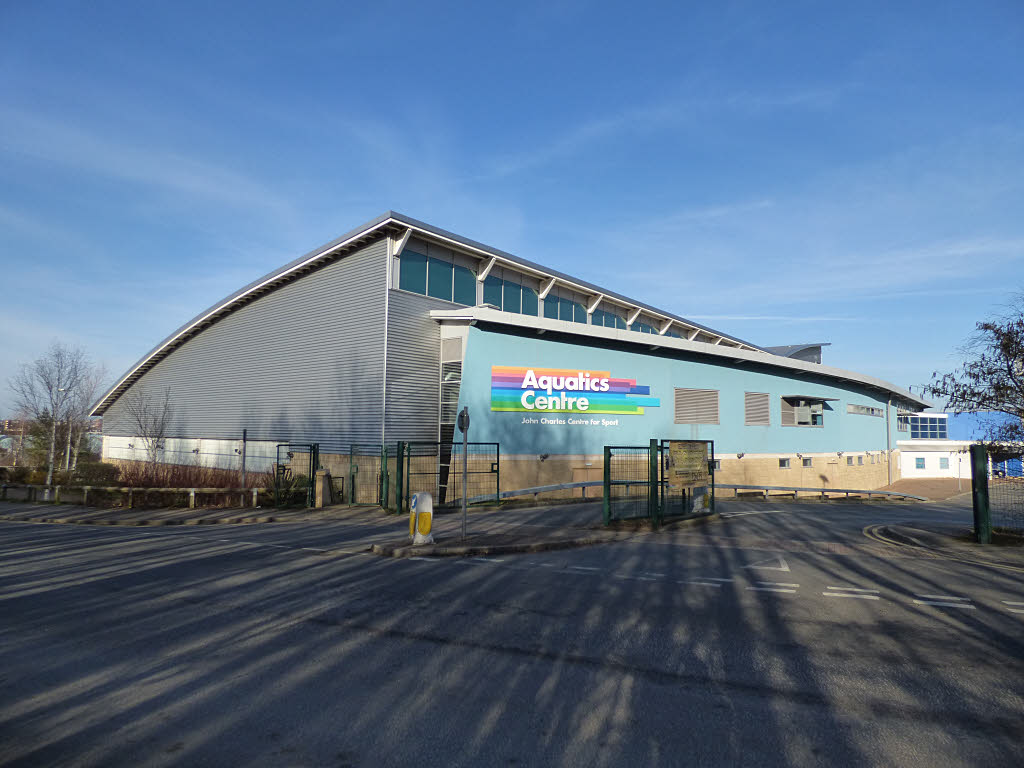
The Aquatics Centre

The Aquatics Centre opened on 29 October 2007. The Olympic size swimming pool replaced previous facilities at the 40-year-old Leeds International Pool.

Two submersible booms built into the main pool enable it to be divided into three pools of different sizes and depths, allowing a flexible daily swimming programme. A floating floor allows the depth of the diving pool and ⅓ of the main pool to be varied from two metres to shallow water for teaching and 0–5 metres for the diving pool. The centre is also suitable for national and international swimming and diving, with seating for 950 people overlooking the main pool and for 150 overlooking the diving area. The £16.5 million centre also includes an aerobics studio and multi-use rooms.

The movement of the city's main public swimming facilities to South Leeds attracted criticism. It left the city centre deprived of facilities and the new centre is difficult to reach for people without the use of a car. The South Leeds Stadium is also remote for people in north Leeds and outlying villages and towns, although other public sport facilities are available throughout Leeds.

=== Tennis Centre ===
The tennis centre at John Charles Centre for Sport consists of 6 indoor courts and 6 outdoor courts. There is also a spectator balcony, changing facilities, meeting room, and cafeteria. The courts are available to hire on a pay and play basis and can be booked up to seven days in advance or eight days in advance by LEEDSCard holders. There are a wide range of tennis sessions available to adults and youths including coaching, individual lessons, social tennis, and competitive league opportunities.

=== Indoor bowls ===
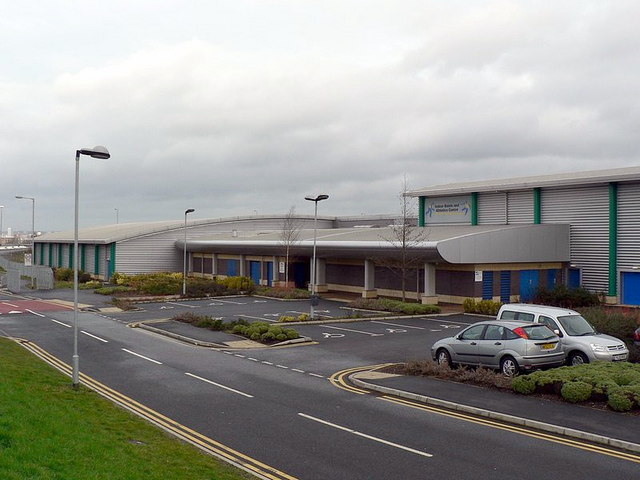
The indoor bowls and athletics centre

The centre has a large indoor bowls complex, this features eight bowls rinks and hosts bowls leagues and tournaments. It is the home venue of Leeds and District Indoor Bowls Club.

== Usage ==
=== Stadium ===
==== Rugby League ====
The stadium has been home to Hunslet since it was opened in 1996. Although the ground is not located in Hunslet it is just over the motorway from the club's original home at Parkside. The stadium has also held other rugby league events.

==== Association Football ====
Since 2024 the stadium has been the home of South Leeds of the Northern Counties East League Division One. Formerly known as Middleton, the club won the Yorkshire Amateur Football League allowing them promotion to the Northern Counties East Football League for the 2024–25 season.

==== Gaelic Football ====
The stadium is also used for Gaelic matches for time to time. Teams from all over Yorkshire, Manchester and Ireland compete for a trophy every year.

==== American football ====
Since 2016 the stadium has been home of English American football club Yorkshire Rams. The stadium has also hosted the Championship Games of the BAFA National Leagues Divisions 1 and 2 since 2015.

=== Aquatics Centre ===
==== Swimming ====
Since April 2008, the City of Leeds Synchronised Swimming Club adopted the facilities as their main centre for training and administration. The club are a regional club which consist of competitive swimmers throughout the whole of the North East.

In May 2012, the Dutch and Chinese Olympic Swimming Teams announced that they would train at the centre in the lead up to the 2012 London Olympics.

==== Diving ====
The centre is the primary training facility for the City of Leeds Diving Club and is responsible for producing some of the best divers in the country who have been chosen to compete at an international and Olympic level. The club has trained a number of athletes, including Rebecca Gallantree, Dan Goodfellow and Matty Lee as well as Great Britain's first ever diving gold medallists Jack Laugher and Chris Mears.

==== Underwater Hockey ====
The Aquatics Centre is used to host national underwater hockey competitions ran by the British Octopush Association.

=== 2010 election ===
The centre was used as the venue to count the general election votes in 2010 for all Leeds constituencies. Previously Leeds Town Hall was used for this purpose. In 2015 this function was moved to the First Direct Arena.

== Map ==
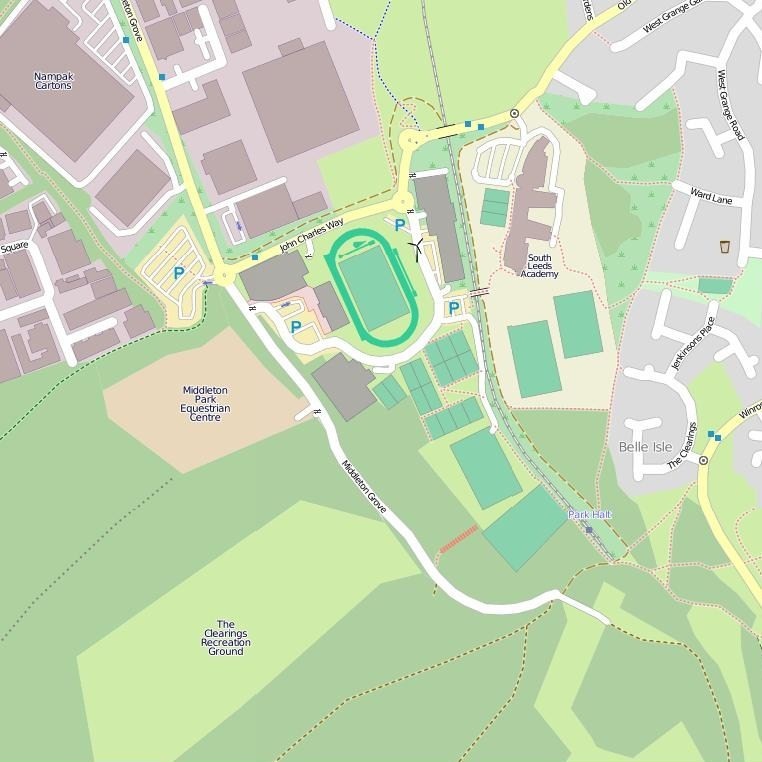
Street plan

== See also ==
- List of long course swimming pools in the United Kingdom
