= Birmingham Hurricanes =

English rugby league club, based in Birmingham

Club information
- Full name: Birmingham Hurricanes Rugby League Football Club
- Nickname: The Hurricanes
- Colours: Purple
- Founded: 1998; 28 years ago (as Coventry Bears); 2021; 5 years ago (as Midlands Hurricanes); 2026; 0 years ago (as Birmingham Hurricanes)
- Website: midlandshurricanes.com

Current details
- Ground: Avery Fields
- CEO: Eorl Crabtree
- Chairman: Mike Lomas
- Coach: Mark Dunning
- Captain: Jon Luke Kirby
- Competition: Championship
- 2026 season: 8th (Elimination Finals)
- Current season

The Birmingham Hurricanes are a semi-professional rugby league club based in Birmingham, West Midlands, England. They were founded in 2021 having took over the professional license owned by Coventry Bears. They currently play in the RFL Championship, the second tier of the British rugby league system.

== History ==
=== 1998–2021: Coventry Bears ===
==== 1998–2015: Formation and Amateur years ====
Coventry Bears was formed in 1998 by a group of university students led by Alan Robinson. They made an approach to Keith Fairbrother, the Coventry rugby union club's Chairman and one time rugby league player at Leigh, with a plan to form a team to play from Coundon Road Stadium.

The club played a season of friendly games in 1999 and were then admitted into the Rugby League Conference for the 2000 season and were unbeaten by any club within their division. They then won their quarter-final against Manchester Knights before being narrowly defeated by only one point by Rotherham Giants in the semi-finals at Super League club Warrington Wolves’ Wilderspool Stadium. Further success followed in 2001 with the Bears reaching the Grand Final at Webb Ellis Road, Rugby, only to lose out by 2pts 10–12 in a match against Teesside Steelers.

The following season Coventry won the Rugby League Conference Grand Final in September 2002 when they beat Hemel Stags at Cheltenham 21–14. Following on from this success the club applied for, and won, elevation to the newly formed National League Three.

The Bears reached the National League Three Grand Final in 2004, winning comfortably versus Warrington Woolston Rovers 48–24. This score being the highest margin in a final in this Competition. The following season Coventry Bears RLFC experienced difficulties and chose to resign from the National League to take time to rebuild and regroup and set up a community junior section. 2006 saw the return of the Bears as a Rugby League Conference Midlands Premier side, and the club finished the season in second place. They went on to beat Leicester Phoenix in the qualifying semi-final to set up a Midlands Grand Final with Nottingham Outlaws, which ended in defeat

Coventry defeated Nottingham Outlaws in 2007 to win the Midlands Premier and also won the Kilkenny 9s, The Bears went on to finish as runners-up to St Albans Centurions losing 28–20 in the final of the Harry Jepson Trophy. In 2008, the Bears finished as runners up in the Midlands Premier to Nottingham. In 2010, Coventry linked up with Super League side Wigan Warriors.

==== 2015–2021: Professionalism in League 1 ====
In July 2014, Coventry were accepted into the semi-professional ranks of League 1 for the 2015 season, and entered their newly formed reserve side into the Conference League South in the same season. They finished their first semi-professional season in 12th place. Coventry finished their final season as the Bears in the 2021 League 1 season in 8th place.

=== 2022–2026: Midlands Hurricanes ===
On 3 November 2021 the club announced a major rebranding in an effort to attract a wider support base from the English midlands region. The club was to be known as Midlands Hurricanes for the 2022 RFL League 1 season. As part of the re-branding the club relocated from Butts Park Arena in Coventry to Portway Stadium in Birmingham for the 2022 season.

Alan Robinson who founded the new Hurricanes club and business resigned from Midlands Hurricanes during the 2022 season selling his stake in the club. Coventry Bears and Bears in the Community CIC Rugby League Foundation moved back to Coventry to continue to develop the club's history and legacy there.

In May 2022, coach Richard Squires, was banned from the sport for three months (with one month suspended) by the Rugby Football League (RFL) for breaching RFL rules on betting. In his absence, assistant coach, Dave Scott took charge of the team.

The new Midlands Hurricanes club moved to Alexander Stadium in the Perry Barr district of Birmingham for the 2023 season and as a new company under new ownership.

The 2024 season was a breakthrough: the team finished fifth and reached the League One play‑offs for the first time in their history — a significant milestone.

Former Super League player Eorl Crabtree became managing director of Midlands Hurricanes in January 2025. In 2025, they continued their progress with one of their strongest seasons yet, achieving their highest points total. Following the RFL's decision to merge League One into the Championship at the end of the 2025 season, Hurricanes joined the newly merged Championship.

The club announced that they had taken a 20-year lease to play at Avery Fields in Bearwood in Sandwell, which is also home to rugby union side Bournville RFC, leaving Alexander Stadium which had been their home since 2023.

=== 2026–: Birmingham Hurricanes ===
Following the conclusion of the 2026 season, having established a long term base in Birmingham, the club changed their name to Birmingham Hurricanes.

== 2027 squad ==
Birmingham Hurricanes 2027 squad
First team squad			Coaching staff
(England) Eddie Battye – PR, LF; (England) Louis Beattie – LF, SR; (England) Connor Bower – SR, CE; (England) Matty Chrimes – WG; (England) Danny Craven – SO, SH, FB; (England) Tyler Dickinson – PR; (England) Lewis Else – SH, SO; (England) Brad Gallagher – SR; (England) Todd Horner – FB, CE	(England) Zach Jebson – SR, CE; (England) Ryan Johnson – CE, WG, FB; (England) Jon Luke Kirby (c) – PR, SR; (Ireland) Aidan McGowan – FB, WG; (England) Sully Medforth – SO, SH; (England) Brandon Moore – HK, LF; (England) Elliott Morris – PR; (England) Ethan Newboult – SO, SH, HK	(England) Ross Oakes – CE; (Wales) Owen Restall – FB, WG, CE; (Wales) Luis Roberts – WG, CE; (Ireland) Oli Roberts – SR, LF; (England) Aiden Roden – HK; (England) Isaac Shaw – PR; (England) Cian Tyrer – WG; (England) Tom Wilkinson – SR; (Jamaica) James Woodburn-Hall – FB, SO, CE	Head coach: Mark Dunning; Assistant coach: Leigh Beattie; Legend: (c) Captain(s); (vc) Vice-captain(s); Updated: Source(s):

== 2027 transfers ==
Gains

Player	Club	Contract	Date
(England) Eddie Battye	Hunslet RLFC	1 year	2 November 2026
(England) Connor Bower	Sheffield Eagles	2 years	3 November 2026
(England) Brad Gallagher	Northern Pride	1 year	20 November 2026

Losses

Player	Club	Contract	Date
(England) Danny Barcoe			28 September 2026
(England) Zeus Silk	Goole Vikings	2 years	30 September 2026
(Scotland) Kieran Moran	Newcastle Thunder	1 year	10 November 2026
(England) Liam Sutcliffe	Doncaster RLFC	2 years	10 November 2026
(England) Toby Warren	Huddersfield Giants	2 years	10 November 2026

Retired

Player	Date
(Scotland) Callum McLelland	28 September 2026
(England) Mikey Wood	28 September 2026

== Seasons ==
Season (As Coventry Bears)	League										Challenge Cup	Other competitions	
Season (As Coventry Bears)	Division	P	W	D	L	F	A	Pts	Pos	Play-offs	Challenge Cup	Other competitions	
2000: Played in RLC Western Division		2000 / 2001 / 2002 / 2003 / 2004; ? / ? / ? / 8th / 1st; 2005 / 2006 / 2007 / 2008 / 2009; 7th / 2nd / 1st / 2nd / 1st; 2010 / 2011 / 2012 / 2013 / 2014; 7th / 3rd / 3rd / ? / ?; (Note: Promotions and relegation are not based on league positions in the Rugby League Conference but by application to the RFL.)									Did not participate	N/A	
2001–2002: Played in RLC Midlands Division		2000 / 2001 / 2002 / 2003 / 2004; ? / ? / ? / 8th / 1st; 2005 / 2006 / 2007 / 2008 / 2009; 7th / 2nd / 1st / 2nd / 1st; 2010 / 2011 / 2012 / 2013 / 2014; 7th / 3rd / 3rd / ? / ?									Did not participate	N/A	
2003–2005: Played in RLC National Division		2000 / 2001 / 2002 / 2003 / 2004; ? / ? / ? / 8th / 1st; 2005 / 2006 / 2007 / 2008 / 2009; 7th / 2nd / 1st / 2nd / 1st; 2010 / 2011 / 2012 / 2013 / 2014; 7th / 3rd / 3rd / ? / ?									Did not participate	N/A	
2006–2009: Played in RLC Midlands Premier		2000 / 2001 / 2002 / 2003 / 2004; ? / ? / ? / 8th / 1st; 2005 / 2006 / 2007 / 2008 / 2009; 7th / 2nd / 1st / 2nd / 1st; 2010 / 2011 / 2012 / 2013 / 2014; 7th / 3rd / 3rd / ? / ?									Did not participate	N/A	
2010–2012: Played in RLC National Division		2000 / 2001 / 2002 / 2003 / 2004; ? / ? / ? / 8th / 1st; 2005 / 2006 / 2007 / 2008 / 2009; 7th / 2nd / 1st / 2nd / 1st; 2010 / 2011 / 2012 / 2013 / 2014; 7th / 3rd / 3rd / ? / ?									Did not participate	N/A	
2013–2014: Played in Conference League South		2000 / 2001 / 2002 / 2003 / 2004; ? / ? / ? / 8th / 1st; 2005 / 2006 / 2007 / 2008 / 2009; 7th / 2nd / 1st / 2nd / 1st; 2010 / 2011 / 2012 / 2013 / 2014; 7th / 3rd / 3rd / ? / ?									Did not participate	N/A	
2015	Championship 1	22	5	17	0	430	755	10	12th	Did not qualify	R3	N/A	
2016	League 1	14	4	1	9	289	460	9	11th	Third in Shield	R3	N/A	
2017	League 1	15	2	0	13	287	615	4	14th	Sixth in Shield	R3	N/A	
2018	League 1	26	7	0	19	406	1058	14	11th	Did not qualify	R5	N/A	
2019	League 1	20	4	0	16	365	829	8	9th	Did not qualify	R3	N/A	
2020	League 1	League abandoned due to the COVID-19 pandemic in the United Kingdom									R4	N/A	
2021	League 1	17	6	0	11	405	532	12	8th	Did not qualify	Did not participate	N/A	
Season (As Midlands Hurricanes)	League										Challenge Cup	Other competitions	
Season (As Midlands Hurricanes)	Division	P	W	D	L	F	A	Pts	Pos	Play-offs	Challenge Cup	Other competitions	
2022	League 1	20	6	0	14	546	696	12	8th	Did not qualify	R2		
2023	League 1	18	5	0	13	408	647	10	8th	Did not qualify	R4		
2024	League One	20	9	0	11	566	424	18	5th	Lost in elimination semi-final	R3		
2025	League One	18	9	1	8	432	333	19	5th (Note: Promotion due to the merging League One and the Championship)	Play-offs cancelled	R3		
2026	Championship	24	13	1	10	652	650	27	8th	Lost in Elimination Final	R3	1895 Cup	SF

== Honours ==
League

- National League Three:

Winners (1): 2004

- RFL Midlands Division One:

Winners (1): 2013

- RLC Midlands Premier:

Winners (3): 2007, 2009, 2010

- RLC Midlands Division:

Winners (2): 2001, 2002

- RLC Western Division:

Winners (1): 2000

Cups

- Harry Jepson Trophy:

Winners (1): 2002
Grand Finalists (4): 2001, 2007, 2009, 2010

Nines

- Midlands 9s:

Winners (1): 2007, 2009, 2013

- Kilkenny 9s

Winners (1): 2007

Women

- RLC Women's Plate:

Winners (1): 2010

- RLC Women's South Division:

Winners (1): 2011

== Women's team ==
The Coventry Bears women's team competed in the Women's Rugby League Conference reaching the Championship final in the first two seasons (2008 and 2009) and winning the Plate final in 2010. Following a restructuring of the league they competed in the Premier Division of the RFL Women's Rugby League until 2013.

In 2024, Midlands Hurricanes introduced a women's team, coached by Jamie-Lee Jones and captained by Kelly Gell, who debuted on 27 April 2024 at the Rugby League Outsiders Midlands 9s tournament in Coventry. The freshly-formed team battled to the final of the tournament, enjoying wins against Loughborough University (26–4) and Leamington Royals (12–4). The final game ended in narrow defeat by the Royal Air Force (12–10), admitting the team to 2nd place in their first 9s tournament.

The team's second appearance saw them travel away to Cheltenham, where they claimed a 40–18 win over Cheltenham Phoenixes in their first 13s match of the season. Their next three 13s games ended in defeat with losses to Bristol Golden Ferns (40–0), West Warriors (24–18), and the Royal Navy (26–20).

The final two games of their inaugural season saw the Hurricanes Women victorious at home with wins against Leamington Royals (12–8) and Telford Raiders (10–4), leaving them in a strong position to head into the 2025 season.

In 2025, the club joined the 2025 Midlands Championship, which was played as using a festival format and also included a Coventry Bears team.

== See also ==
- Rugby Football League expansion
