= Archie Siswick =

English rugby league footballer

Personal information
- Full name: Archie Siswick
- Born: 15 September 1894 Wakefield, England
- Died: first ¼ 1964 (aged 69) Leeds, England

Playing information
- Height: 5 ft 10 in (178 cm)
- Weight: 11 st 12 lb (75 kg)

Rugby union
Club
Years	Team	Pld	T	G	FG	P
1911–19	Wakefield RFC

Rugby league
- Position: Fullback, Centre
Club
Years	Team	Pld	T	G	FG	P
1919–30	Wakefield Trinity	317	43	3	0	135
Representative
Years	Team	Pld	T	G	FG	P
1924	Yorkshire	2	0	0	0	0

Archie Siswick (15 September 1894 – first ¼ 1964) was an English rugby union and professional rugby league footballer who played in the 1910s, 1920s and 1930s. He played club level rugby union (RU) for Wakefield RFC, and representative level rugby league (RL) for Yorkshire, and at club level for Wakefield Trinity, as a fullback or centre.

== Background ==
Archie Siswick's birth was registered in Wakefield district, West Riding of Yorkshire, England, he was a Lance corporal in the Queen's Own Yorkshire Dragoons during the First World War, and his death aged 69 was registered in Leeds district, West Riding of Yorkshire, England.

== Playing career ==
=== Rugby Union ===
Archie Siswick played rugby union for Wakefield RFC between 1911/12 and 1919/20. He was a centre and a press report stated that he had been elected club captain for the 1913/14 season, although later records do not back up this statement.

=== Rugby league ===
Archie Siswick turned professional with Wakefield Trinity during the 1919/20 season. His heritage number is 235. He went onto make 317 appearances and scoring 135 points, until his retirement during the 1929/30 season. He had been placed on the transfer list but decided to retire rather than join another club. The Wakefield Express described him as "one of the most enthusiastic and loyal players Trinity ever had."

Archie Siswick won cap(s) for Yorkshire (RL) while at Wakefield Trinity.

He played in Wakefield Trinity's 9–8 victory over Batley in the 1924–25 Yorkshire Cup Final during the 1924–25 season at Headingley Stadium on Saturday 22 November 1924.

He played at centre in Wakefield Trinity's 3–29 defeat by Australia in the 1921–22 Kangaroo tour of Great Britain match at Belle Vue, Wakefield on Saturday 22 October 1921.

Archie Siswick's Testimonial match at Wakefield Trinity took place in 1930.

Archie Siswick made his début for Wakefield Trinity during August 1919.
