= Harry Rees =

Harry Rees may refer to:

- Harry Rees (rugby league) (1899–1953), Welsh rugby league player
- Harry Rees (rugby union) (1908–1978), Welsh international rugby union player

== See also ==
- H. B. Reese (Harry Burnett Reese; 1879–1956), American inventor and businessman
- Harry Reis (born 1949), American professor of psychology
