= Ian Marsh =

Ian Marsh may refer to:

- Ian Marsh (writer) (born 1960), British writer and editor
- Ian Marsh (footballer) (1955–2021), former Australian rules footballer
- Ian Craig Marsh (born 1956), English musician

== See also ==
- Iain Marsh (born 1980), English-born rugby league footballer
