= Fred Carter (rugby league) =

English rugby league footballer

Personal information
- Full name: Fred Carter
- Born: 9 August 1894 Castleford, England
- Died: unknown

Playing information
- Position: Wing, Second-row, Loose forward
Club
Years	Team	Pld	T	G	FG	P
1914–19	Leeds	39	8	0	0	24
1920–27	Batley	207	82	≥0	≥0	246
1927–28	Castleford	41	11	0	0	33
1928–29	Bradford Northern	21	1	0	0	3
	Total	308	102			306
Representative
Years	Team	Pld	T	G	FG	P
1919–21	Yorkshire	2	0	0	0	0

Fred Carter was an English professional rugby league footballer who played in the 1910s and 1920s. He played at representative level for Yorkshire, and at club level for Leeds, Batley and Castleford, as a wing, second-row or loose forward.

== Background ==
Fred Carter was born in Castleford, West Riding of Yorkshire, England.

== Playing career ==
=== Club career ===
Carter made his début for Leeds against York at Headingley, Leeds on Saturday 12 December 1914, he was transferred from Leeds to Batley on Thursday 8 January 1920, he made his début for Batley as a loose forward, and scored a try in the 13-0 victory over Hull Kingston Rovers at Mount Pleasant, Batley on Saturday 10 January 1920. During his time at Batley, he scored eighty-two tries; seventy-five playing as a forward; including five hat-tricks, and a further seven tries playing as a wing.

Carter played loose forward in Batley's 13-7 victory over Wigan in the 1923–24 Championship Final during the 1923–24 season, at The Cliff, Broughton, Salford on Saturday 3 May 1924, in front of a crowd of 13,729.

Carter played in Batley's victory in the Yorkshire League during the 1923–24 season, and as a runner-up during the 1921–22 season and 1925–26 season.

Carter played loose forward in Batley's 0-5 defeat by York in the 1922–23 Yorkshire Cup Final during the 1922–23 season at Headingley, Leeds on Saturday 2 December 1922, in front of a crowd of 33,719, and played at second-row in the 8-9 defeat by Wakefield Trinity in the 1924–25 Yorkshire Cup Final during the 1924–25 season at Headingley, Leeds on Saturday 22 November 1924, in front of a crowd of 25,546.

He played his last match for Batley in the 2-6 defeat by Hunslet at Parkside, Hunslet on Saturday 3 September 1927, by which time he had become Batley's all-time record try-scoring forward, he was transferred from Batley to Castleford for £75 on Monday 26 September 1927 (based on inflation equivalent to £5,655 in 2023) (based on increases in average earnings approximately equivalent to £12,460 in 2016), over his career he scored in excess of 100 tries as a forward, this is an outstanding achievement in this era, and may even rugby league's record pre-World War II try-scoring forward.

=== Representative honours ===
Carter represented "The Whites" at loose forward against "The Reds" in the 1920 Great Britain Lions tour trial match at Watersheddings, Oldham on Monday 1 March 1920, and represented "The Whites" at loose forward, and scored a try in the 26-18 victory over "The Reds" in the 1924 Great Britain Lions tour trial match at Headingley, Leeds on Wednesday 9 January 1924, unfortunately he was injured and unable to play for either tour.

Carter won a cap for Yorkshire while at Batley; he played loose forward in the 30-12 victory over Cumberland in the County Championship match during the 1921–22 season at Thrum Hall, Halifax on Monday 14 November 1921.
