= Ian Talbot =

English RL coach and former professional rugby league footballer

Personal information
- Full name: Ian Talbot
- Born: 24 January 1977 (age 49)

Playing information
- Position: Hooker
Club
Years	Team	Pld	T	G	FG	P
1997	Wigan Warriors	3	1	0	0	4
1999	Wakefield Trinity Wildcats	14	2	31	0	70
2000–≥00	Dewsbury Rams
	Total	17	3	31	0	74

Coaching information
Club
Years	Team	Gms	W	D	L	W%
2012–15	Rochdale Hornets	77	39	0	38	51
- Source: As of 4 March 2026

Ian Talbot (born 24 January 1977), is a former professional rugby league footballer who played in the 1990s and 2000s. He played at club level for the Wigan Warriors, the Wakefield Trinity Wildcats, and the Dewsbury Rams, as a hooker.

After ending his playing career, Talbot began coaching at St Helens R.F.C. in 2002 as assistant coach to Keiron Purtill for the Under-18's side. He progressed through the coaching ranks at Saints and spent four years as head coach of their Under-20s before becoming head coach of Rochdale Hornets in October 2012.

Sporting positions
Preceded by John Stankevitch; 2009–2012	Coach Rochdale Hornets; 2012–2015	Succeeded by Alan Kilshaw; 2015–2019
