= Leo Aliyu =

Nigeria international rugby league player

Personal information
- Full name: Leo Aliyu
- Born: 24 November 2004 (age 21) Yorkshire, England
- Height: 183 cm (6 ft 0 in)
- Weight: 106 kg (16 st 10 lb)

Playing information
- Position: Prop
Club
Years	Team	Pld	T	G	FG	P
2025–26	Keighley Cougars	20	0	0	0	0
2027–	Batley Bulldogs	0	0	0	0	0
	Total	20	0	0	0	0
Representative
Years	Team	Pld	T	G	FG	P
2023	Yorkshire under-18	1	0	0	0	0
2025–	Nigeria	1	0	0	0	0
- As of 14 October 2026

Leo Aliyu (born 24 November 2004) is a Nigerian rugby league prop who plays for Batley Bulldogs in the RFL Championship.

== Club career ==
=== Junior career ===
Aliyu played junior rugby at Siddal before joining Leeds Rhinos Academy midway through 2022, featuring for the Academy and Reserves sides with strong performances seeing him being called up for the 2023 Academy Origin II, featuring for Yorkshire under-18 in the 32-32 draw against Lancashire under-18.

Aliyu nearly quit rugby before rediscovering his love for the sport, he described his call-up to Yorkshire as an 'honourable' moment. "Before I came to Leeds, I didn't know too much about Rugby. I nearly gave up a few years ago but I ended up at Siddal and then here, so I'm glad I didn't."

=== Keighley Cougars ===
Ahead of the 2024 season, Leo was signed by League One club Keighley Cougars. Head coach, Jake Webster described Leo as “Leo is a big raw unit with great leg speed. If we can channel that and work with Leo on the technical detail of the game we have a great player on our hands."

On 2 February 2025, Aliyu made his debut coming off the bench in the 2nd round of the Challenge Cup, against the York Knights. York won 72-12. Aliyu impressed over twelve appearances for Keighley in 2025, but managed only eight appearances in 2026 due to concussion causing him to spend extended time on the sideline.

=== Batley Bulldogs ===
On 14 October 2026 it was reported that he had signed for Batley Bulldogs in the RFL Championship

=== Nigeria ===
Aliyu was selected by his then club head coach, Alan Kilshaw, to play for the Nigeria national side against Cumbria, at Craven Park, Barrow-in-Furness. Leo started at Prop. It was Nigeria's first game on British soil, with the hosts winning the game 70-6.
