= Ned Thomas (rugby league) =

Wales international rugby league footballer

Personal information
- Full name: Edward Thomas
- Born: unknown Tumble, Carmarthenshire, Wales
- Died: unknown

Playing information
- Height: 5 ft 8.5 in (174 cm)
- Weight: 11 st 3 lb (71 kg)

Rugby union
Club
Years	Team	Pld	T	G	FG	P
	Tumble RFC

Rugby league
- Position: Wing
Club
Years	Team	Pld	T	G	FG	P
1919–24	Oldham	107	47	0	0	141
1924–28	Wakefield Trinity	82	36	0	0	141
	Total	189	83	0	0	282
Representative
Years	Team	Pld	T	G	FG	P
1923	Wales	1

Edward "Eddie"/"Ned" Thomas (birth unknown – death unknown), also known by the nickname of "Jumper" or Tommy Gwag, was a Welsh professional rugby league footballer who played in the 1910s and 1920s. He played at representative level for Wales, and at club level for Tumble RFC whom he captained, Oldham, and Wakefield Trinity, as a wing.

== Playing career ==
=== International honours ===
Ned Thomas won a cap for Wales while at Oldham in 1923.

=== County Cup Final appearances ===
Ned Thomas played on the wing in Wakefield Trinity's 9–8 victory over Batley in the 1924–25 Yorkshire Cup Final during the 1924–25 season at Headingley, Leeds on Saturday 22 November 1924.
