= 1922–23 Yorkshire Cup =

- Structure: Regional knockout championship
- Teams: 14
- Winners: York
- Runners-up: Batley

The 1922–23 Yorkshire Cup was the fifteen occasion on which the Yorkshire Cup competition had been held. For the third year in succession, the name of yet another new club appeared on the trophy. This year, York won the trophy by beating Batley by the score of 5–0 in the final. The match was played at Headingley, Leeds, now in West Yorkshire. The attendance was 33,719 and receipts were £2,414.

== Background ==
The Rugby Football League's Yorkshire Cup competition was a knock-out competition between (mainly professional) rugby league clubs from the county of Yorkshire. The actual area was at times increased to encompass other teams from outside the county such as Newcastle, Mansfield, Coventry, and even London (in the form of Acton & Willesden). The Rugby League season always (until the onset of "Summer Rugby" in 1996) ran from around August-time through to around May-time and this competition always took place early in the season, in the Autumn, with the final taking place in (or just before) December (The only exception to this was when disruption of the fixture list was caused during, and immediately after, the two World Wars).

== Competition and results ==
This season, two junior clubs were invited to enter bringing the total number taking part up to a "full house" of sixteen, which in turn removed the necessity to have any byes.

=== Round 1 ===
Involved 8 matches (with no byes) and 16 clubs

| Game No | Fixture date | Home team | Score | Away team | Venue | Ref |
|---|---|---|---|---|---|---|
| 1 | Sat 14 Oct 1922 | Bradford Northern | 13–3 | Keighley | Birch Lane | |
| 2 | Sat 14 Oct 1922 | Bramley | 2–7 | Dewsbury | Barley Mow | |
| 3 | We 18 Oct 1922 | Sharlston Rovers (Note: Sharlston Rovers are a junior (or amateur) club from Wakefield) | 11–32 | Batley | Mount Pleasant (Note: Sharlston Rovers forgo ground advantage for a better ground/higher receipts) | |
| 4 | Sat 21 Oct 1922 | Featherstone Rovers | 9–17 | Leeds | Post Office Road | |
| 5 | Sat 21 Oct 1922 | Huddersfield | 5–0 | Halifax | Fartown | |
| 6 | Sat 21 Oct 1922 | Hull Kingston Rovers | 14–2 | Hull | Craven Park (1) (Note: The first Yorkshire Cup match to be played at the new stadium) | |
| 7 | Sat 21 Oct 1922 | Hunslet | 11–13 | Wakefield Trinity | Parkside | |
| 8 | Sat 21 Oct 1922 | York | 24–2 | Elland Wanderers (Note: Elland Wanderers were a Junior/amateur club from Elland (Halifax)) | Clarence Street | |

=== Round 2 – quarterfinals ===
Involved 4 matches and 8 clubs

| Game No | Fixture date | Home team | Score | Away team | Venue | Ref |
|---|---|---|---|---|---|---|
| 1 | Sat 4 Nov 1922 | York | 4–3 | Huddersfield | Clarence Street | |
| 2 | Sat 4 Nov 1922 | Batley | 15–3 | Hull Kingston Rovers | Mount Pleasant | |
| 3 | Sat 4 Nov 1922 | Leeds | 22–3 | Bradford Northern | Headingley | |
| 4 | Sat 4 Nov 1922 | Wakefield Trinity | ? | Dewsbury | ? | |

=== Round 3 – semifinals ===
Involved 2 matches and 4 clubs

| Game No | Fixture date | Home team | Score | Away team | Venue | Ref |
|---|---|---|---|---|---|---|
| 1 | Sat 18 Nov 1922 | Leeds | 0–28 | Batley | Headingley | |
| 2 | Sat 18 Nov 1922 | Wakefield Trinity | 2–4 | York | Belle Vue | |

=== Final ===
| Game No | Fixture date | Home team | Score | Away team | Venue | Att | Rec | Ref |
|---|---|---|---|---|---|---|---|---|
| | Saturday 2 December 1922 | York | 5–0 | Batley | Headingley | 33,719 (Note: The attendance was at the time, a record not to be bettered until 1949, and then only the once.) | £2414 (Note: The receipts of £2,414 were also a record and this would stand for almost 25 years until broken in 1946 with a new record of £3,718) | |

==== Teams and scorers ====
| York | No. | Batley |
|---|---|---|
| | teams | |
| Edward Owen | 1 | Joe Robinson |
| L. Farrar | 2 | Albert Carter |
| A. Corsi | 3 | Harry Rees |
| Jack Corsi | 4 | Bryn Williams |
| S. Boston | 5 | Hugh Murray |
| S. Short | 6 | Ike Fowler |
| J. McEwan | 7 | Willie Scott |
| H. Brown | 8 | George Ramsbottom |
| F. Mirfield | 9 | James Sykes |
| J. Bettridge | 10 | Allen Mortimer |
| W. Whiting | 11 | George Douglas |
| G. S. Reynolds | 12 | Norman Gardiner |
| J. A. Ashton | 13 | Fred Carter |
| T. Goulden | Coach | ?? |
| 5 | score | 0 |
| 3 | HT | 0 |
| | Scorers | |
| | Tries | |
| L. Farrar (1) | T | |
| | Goals | |
| J. McEwan (DG) | G | |
| Referee | | Mr B. Ennion (Wigan) |

Scoring - Try = three (3) points - Goal = two (2) points - Drop goal = two (2) points

=== The road to success ===
First round
Hunslet | 11
Wakefield Trinity | 13
Bramley | 2
Dewsbury | 7
York | 24
Elland Wanderers | 2
Huddersfield | 5
Halifax | 0
Featherstone Rovers | 9
Leeds | 17
Bradford Northern | 13
Keighley | 3
Sharlston Rovers | 11
Batley | 32
Hull Kingston Rovers | 14
Hull | 2

Second round
Wakefield Trinity | w
Dewsbury
York | 4
Huddersfield | 3
Leeds | 22
Bradford Northern | 3
Batley | 15
Hull Kingston Rovers | 3

Semifinals
Wakefield Trinity | 2
York | 4
Leeds | 0
Batley | 28

Final
York | 5
Batley | 0

== See also ==
- 1922–23 Northern Rugby Football League season
- Rugby league county cups
