= Alan Kilshaw =

English rugby league coach (born 1982)

Personal information
- Full name: Alan Kilshaw
- Born: 23 November 1982 (age 43) England

Playing information
- Position: Loose forward, Halfback
Club
Years	Team	Pld	T	G	FG	P
2004	Swinton Lions	1	0	0	0	0
2006	Blackpool Panthers	9	2	0	0	8
	Total	10	2	0	0	8

Coaching information
Club
Years	Team	Gms	W	D	L	W%
–2009	Warrington Wizards
2011–13	England under-16 (Assistant)
2013–15	Sarina Crocodiles
2013–15	Mackay Cutters (Assistant)
2016–18	Rochdale Hornets	90	27	2	38	30
2021–23	Hunslet	54	23	1	18	43
2024	Swinton Lions	33	13	0	20	39
2025	Oakey Bears	0	0	0	0
2025	Keighley Cougars	14	6	0	8	43
2026–	Oldham RLFC	30	24	0	6	80
	Total	221	93	3	90	42
Representative
Years	Team	Gms	W	D	L	W%
2025–	Nigeria	1	0	0	1	0
- As of 3 November 2026

Alan Kilshaw (born 23 November 1982) is an English professional rugby league coach who is the head coach of Oldham in the RFL Championship.

== Playing career ==
Kilshaw came through the St Helens Academy. Playing his senior career at Swinton Lions and Blackpool Panthers.

== Coaching career ==
=== Warrington Wizards ===
Alan Kilshaw coached at Warrington Wizards in the National Conference League until 2009 where he left to take up a full time role with Warrington Wolves.

=== Warrington Wolves, Cheshire and England Academy ===
Kilshaw worked as the Warrington and Cheshire development officer as well as working with the Warrington Wolves’ Player Development Centre.

Alan Kilshaw was an assistant coach to the England under-16 between 2011 and 2013.

=== Sarina Crocodiles and Mackay Cutters ===
In 2013, Alan moved to Australia to head coach Sarina Crocodiles, a feeder club to the Mackay Cutters where he was also appointed assistant coach.

=== Rochdale Hornets ===
Returning to the UK in October 2015 to join up with Kingstone Press League 1 side Rochdale Hornets.

In his first season with the club he coached them to lose only 1 and drawing 1 game, finishing 2nd in the table. Before going on to beat Toulouse Olympique away in France to earn promotion into the RFL Championship 1.

In 2017, Kilshaw led Rochdale to a ninth-place finish in their first season back in the Championship. Notable highlights included away victories at Bradford and Featherstone, along with a dramatic 38–30 win over Oldham at the club’s first-ever appearance at the Blackpool Bash, having trailed 30–8 at half-time.

In 2018, Rochdale Hornets secured their Championship status with a crucial victory away at Sheffield Eagles. The season had been overshadowed by significant financial difficulties following the resignation of chairman Mark Wynn, which led to several players leaving the club.

Despite the turmoil, Kilshaw was widely praised for his professionalism throughout a turbulent campaign. Some described the club’s survival as a minor miracle, with Rochdale winning their final two games — Dewsbury at home and Sheffield away — despite having only 14 players available for selection.

Kilshaw, informed the club in August 2018, he would not be signing the contract extension he was offered, citing the ongoing instability and off-field challenges at the club.

=== Hunslet ===
After a break away from the sport Alan joined Hunslet in the middle of the 2021 season, replacing Gary Thornton. He tenure ended at the end of the 2023 season moving to RFL Championship side Swinton Lions. In his first season they lost in the Elimination Playoffs against Doncaster, and in his final season at Hunslet lost in the Preliminary Final once again against Doncaster.

He left the club due to travel reasons starting a teaching job as well as having a young family.

=== Swinton Lions ===
Alan joined his former club Swinton Lions ahead of the 2024 season.

After a game against Widnes Vikings, pictures were posted online by Widnes forward Nick Gregson of sheets that had been dotted around the Swinton dressing room which showed an image of him with a noose around his neck

Kilshaw’s Swinton Lions side produced a remarkable campaign, winning nine games to finish 10th and pulling off several major upsets. They beat Toulouse Olympique away in Toulouse, defeated Halifax Panthers, beat Featherstone Rovers home and away, overcame Widnes Vikings in both the 1895 Cup and league, and also won away at Sheffield Eagles in Sheffield.

However, the season ended in controversy. Due to an administrative error, nine players were unavailable for the promotion play-off final against Hunslet. It was widely believed this was the reason Kilshaw resigned after the game, with some sources reporting he had stepped down immediately upon learning of the mistake before later being asked by the board to continue.

Swinton Lions had won three of their last four matches and finished outside the relegation places, but because of the league restructure they were forced into a final against Kilshaw’s former club Hunslet — without the nine players who had already booked family holidays after being given incorrect information about the date of the fixture.

=== Oakey Bears ===
Alan moved back to Australia to join up with Toowoomba Rugby League side Oakey Bears, however after only 12 weeks and no competitive games he left to move back to England due to Visa issues.

=== Keighley Cougars ===
After a disastrous start to the 2025 Betfred League One season, with head coach Jake Webster stepping down, owner Ryan O'Neil and Kaue Garcia signed Alan Kilshaw until the end of 2026.

Although finishing 9th in the table in 2025, Kilshaw managed to steady the ship at the West Yorkshire town winning 6 out of the last 8 games in his first year, earning himself a contract extension until the end of 2027.

On 5 January 2026 it was reported that he had unexpectedly quit, just one week ahead of the new season starting, with Dan Burton stepping into the vacant head coach role in the interim.

=== Oldham RLFC ===
On 6 January 2026 it was reported that he had taken the role of head-coach for Oldham RLFC in the RFL Championship

=== Nigeria ===
On 17 October 2025 it was reported that he would take charge of the Nigeria team ahead of the forthcoming fixture v Cumbria in November.
