= George Davidge =

England international rugby league footballer

Personal information
- Full name: Arthur George Davidge
- Born: 17 April 1895 Taunton, England
- Died: third ¼ 1978 (aged 83) Blackpool & Fylde district, England

Playing information

Rugby union
Club
Years	Team	Pld	T	G	FG	P
≤1921–21	Plymouth Albion R.F.C.

Rugby league
- Position: Centre
Club
Years	Team	Pld	T	G	FG	P
1921–23	Huddersfield
1923–≥24	Batley
	Total	0	0	0	0	0
Representative
Years	Team	Pld	T	G	FG	P
1924	England	1	0	0	0	0

George Davidge (17 April 1895 – 1978) was an English rugby union, and professional rugby league footballer who played in the 1920s. He played club level rugby union (RU) for Plymouth Albion R.F.C., and representative level rugby league (RL) for England, and at club level for Huddersfield and Batley, as a centre.

== Background ==
George Davidge was born in Taunton, Somerset, and his death aged 83 was registered in Blackpool & Fylde district, Lancashire, England.

== Playing career ==
=== Club career ===
Davidge left Plymouth Albion R.F.C. to sign for Huddersfield in October 1921, he was transferred from Huddersfield to Batley on 28 September 1923 for a transfer fee of £300 (based on increases in average earnings, this would be approximately £56,260 in 2016).

Davidge played at centre in Batley's 13-7 victory over Wigan in the 1923–24 Championship Final during the 1923–24 season, at The Cliff, Broughton, Salford on Saturday 3 May 1924, in front of a crowd of 13,729.

Davidge played at centre in Batley's 8-9 defeat by Wakefield Trinity in the 1924–25 Yorkshire Cup Final during the 1924–25 season at Headingley, Leeds on Saturday 22 November 1924, in front of a crowd of 25,546.

=== International honours ===
Davidge won a cap for England (RL) while at Batley in 1924 against Other Nationalities.
