= Iain Marsh =

Scotland international rugby league footballer

Personal information
- Full name: Iain Marsh
- Born: 6 October 1980 (age 45) Blackbrook, St Helens, England

Playing information
- Position: Wing, Centre, Second-row
Club
Years	Team	Pld	T	G	FG	P
≤1998–01	Salford City Reds
2001–01	Barrow Raiders
2004–04	Oldham
2005–05	Batley Bulldogs
≤2007–≥07	Rochdale Hornets
2008–08	Workington Town
Representative
Years	Team	Pld	T	G	FG	P
2004–07	Scotland	8

Iain Marsh (born 6 October 1980) is a former rugby league footballer who played in the 1990s and 2000s. He played at representative level for Scotland, and at club level for the Salford City Reds, St Helens (A-Team), the Barrow Raiders, Oldham, the Batley Bulldogs, Rochdale Hornets and Workington Town, as a wing, centre or second-row.

== Background ==
Iain Marsh was born in Blackbrook, St Helens, Merseyside, England.

== International honours ==
Iain Marsh won 5 caps for Scotland in 2004–2007 while at Oldham R.L.F.C., Batley Bulldogs, and Rochdale Hornets + 3-caps (sub).

== Genealogical information ==
Iain Marsh is the son of the rugby league footballer who played in the 1970s for Oldham, and Rochdale Hornets; Derek Marsh.
