= Brinley Williams =

Wales international dual-code rugby footballer

Bryn Williams
Personal information
- Full name: Brinley Williams
- Born: 3 April 1895 Llanelli, Wales
- Died: 5 January 1987 (aged 91) Llanelli, Wales

Playing information

Rugby union
- Position: Wing
Club
Years	Team	Pld	T	G	FG	P
	Bryncaerau RFC
	Llanelli RFC
	Total	0	0	0	0	0
Representative
Years	Team	Pld	T	G	FG	P
1920	Wales	3				12

Rugby league
- Position: Back
Club
Years	Team	Pld	T	G	FG	P
	Batley
	Leeds
	Pontypridd
	Total	0	0	0	0	0
Representative
Years	Team	Pld	T	G	FG	P
1921–22	Wales	2	1	0	0	3
1921	Other Nationalities	1	0	0	0	0

Brinley "Bryn" Williams (3 April 1895 – 5 January 1987) was a Welsh dual-code international rugby wing who played rugby union for Llanelli and rugby league with Batley. At rugby union he won three caps for Wales, and at rugby league he won two caps for Wales, and one cap for Other Nationalities.

== Rugby career ==
Williams first came to note as a rugby player when he joined first-class Welsh team Llanelli. He had previously played for Bryncaerau, but after the cessation of rugby with the outbreak of World War I, he joined the Royal Welsh Fusiliers and was posted to the front. During his service in the War, he was wounded on three occasions, and came to the notice of his battalion commander Lord Howard de Walden, who after the war named a racehorse, Brynfleet, after him.

With the end of the war Williams joined Llanelli, and in 1920 he was awarded his first international cap. He was selected at wing, opposite William Charles Powell, for the last three games of the 1920 Five Nations Championship; with his first match played away from home against Scotland. Despite Wales losing the game, Williams was reselected for the next two matches, wins over France and Ireland. In the Ireland game, Williams scored his first international points, with three tries.

In 1920 Williams left Llanelli and rugby union by joining professional rugby league team Batley. His signing-on fee was a reported as £400, (based on increases in average earnings, this would be approximately £44,230 in 2016), and he made his début for the club on 28 August. While at Batley, Williams made three international appearances, two with Wales and one with Other Nationalities, all of the matches in 1921. His two games for Wales were against England and Australia, while the Other Nationalities was an away game to England.

Williams played at centre in Batley's 0–5 defeat by York in the 1922–23 Yorkshire Cup Final during the 1922–23 season at Headingley, Leeds on Saturday 2 December 1922, in front of a crowd of 33,719.

After leaving Batley he played for Leeds, and then Pontypridd.

== Bibliography ==
- Godwin, Terry (1984). The International Rugby Championship 1883-1983. Grafton Street, London: Willow Books. ISBN 0-00-218060-X.
- Smith, David; Williams, Gareth (1980). Fields of Praise: The Official History of The Welsh Rugby Union. Cardiff: University of Wales Press. ISBN 0-7083-0766-3.
