= George Douglas (rugby) =

Scotland international rugby union, and rugby league footballer

Personal information
- Full name: George Douglas
- Born: Scotland

Playing information

Rugby union
Club
Years	Team	Pld	T	G	FG	P
	Jedforest RFC
Representative
Years	Team	Pld	T	G	FG	P
1921	Scotland	1	0	0	0	0

Rugby league
- Position: Second-row
Club
Years	Team	Pld	T	G	FG	P
1921–25	Batley	0	0	0	0	0
- As of 17 April 2021

George Douglas (birth unknown – death unknown) was a Scottish rugby union and rugby league footballer.

== Rugby union ==
He was capped once for Scotland in 1921. He also played for Jedforest RFC.

== Rugby league ==
Douglas transferred to Batley during the 1921–22 season.

=== Championship final appearances ===
George Douglas played at second-row in Batley's 13–7 victory over Wigan in the 1923–24 Championship Final during the 1923–24 season, at The Cliff, Broughton, Salford on Saturday 3 May 1924, in front of a crowd of 13,729.

=== County Cup Final appearances ===
George Douglas played at second-row in Batley's 0–5 defeat by York in the 1922–23 Yorkshire Cup Final during the 1922–23 season at Headingley, Leeds on Saturday 2 December 1922, in front of a crowd of 33,719, and played at second-row in the 8–9 defeat by Wakefield Trinity in the 1924–25 Yorkshire Cup Final during the 1924–25 season at Headingley, Leeds on Saturday 22 November 1924, in front of a crowd of 25,546.
