= Paul Hicks (rugby league) =

English rugby league footballer

Personal information
- Full name: Paul Hicks
- Born: 22 June 1977 (age 48) Wakefield, England

Playing information
- Weight: 15 st 7 lb (98 kg)
- Position: Prop
Club
Years	Team	Pld	T	G	FG	P
1994–99	Wakefield Trinity (Wildcats)	35	2	0	0	0
1999–01	Batley Bulldogs	52	5
2002–06	Dewsbury Rams	112	6
	Total	199	13	0	0	0

Paul Hicks (born 22 June 1977) is an English former professional rugby league footballer who played in the 1990s and 2000s. He played at club level for Normanton, Wakefield Trinity (Wildcats), Batley Bulldogs, and Dewsbury Rams, as a prop. Paul was educated at Horbury School between 1988 and 1993. Paul is now married to Toni; they live in Waihi on the North Island of New Zealand. He has three children from a previous marriage
