= George Brown (rugby league, Batley) =

England international rugby league footballer

Personal information
- Full name: George Brown

Playing information
- Position: Second-row
Club
Years	Team	Pld	T	G	FG	P
≤1942–≥45	Batley
≤1942–≥42	→Leeds (guest)
	Total	0	0	0	0	0
Representative
Years	Team	Pld	T	G	FG	P
1945	England	1	0	0	0	0

George Brown is an English former professional rugby league footballer who played in the 1940s. He played at representative level for England, and at club level for Batley and Leeds (World War II guest), as a second-row.

== Playing career ==
=== Leeds ===
George Brown played right-second-row in Leeds' 15–10 victory over Halifax in the 1941–42 Challenge Cup Final during the 1941–42 season at Odsal Stadium, Bradford, in front of a crowd of 15,250.

=== International honours ===
George Brown won a cap for England while at Batley in 1945 against Wales.
