= Ike Fowler =

Wales dual-code international rugby footballer & RL match official

Personal information
- Full name: Isaac John Fowler
- Born: 27 August 1894; Pantyffynnon, Wales
- Died: 17 June 1981 (aged 86); Batley, England

Playing information

Rugby union
- Position: Scrum-half
Club
Years	Team	Pld	T	G	FG	P
	Tycroes RFC
	Ammanford RFC
1919	Llanelli RFC
	Total	0	0	0	0	0
Representative
Years	Team	Pld	T	G	FG	P
1919	Wales	1				0

Rugby league
- Position: Back
Club
Years	Team	Pld	T	G	FG	P
1919–26	Batley RLFC
Representative
Years	Team	Pld	T	G	FG	P
1921	Other Nationalities	1				0
1926	Wales	1				0

Isaac John Fowler (27 August 1894 – 17 June 1981) was a Welsh dual-code international rugby union, and professional rugby league footballer who played in the 1910s and 1920s. He played representative level rugby union (RU) for Wales, and at club level for Ammanford RFC and Llanelli RFC, as a scrum-half, and representative level rugby league (RL) for Wales, and the Other Nationalities, and at club level for Batley (vice-captain), as a scrum-half.

== Background ==
Fowler was born in 1894 in Pantyffynnon, a small village in Carmarthenshire, Wales he worked as a coal miner, and a foreman, and he died aged 86 in Batley, West Yorkshire, England.

== Rugby career ==
Fowler first played rugby for Tycroes, a club in the neighbouring village. He progressed to Ammanford before being selected by first class Welsh team, Llanelli. On the recommencement of rugby after the First World War, Llanelli faced two matches against New Zealand teams, the Larkhill depot of the New Zealand Army and the New Zealand Maoris. Fowler played in both matches. In 1919, Fowler won his first and only rugby union international call-up, when he was one of thirteen new caps to represent Wales against a New Zealand Army team. The Wales team lost 3–6, but before the country's next international match, Fowler turned professional, by joining rugby league team Batley. Such was the resentment caused by turning professional, Fowler was not only banned for life from playing rugby union at any level; a standard punishment, but he also had to wait until a 1975 'amnesty' to receive his international cap.

Fowler had a long career at Batley and secured two further international caps. His first came in 1921, when he was chosen to play for the Other Nationalities team to face England. Protests were made to recognise the team as a Wales squad as the entire 13 members were all Welsh by birth, but the request was rejected. On 12 April 1926 he was selected to play for the actual Wales rugby league team, against England at Pontypridd. Fowler played scrum-half in Batley's 13–7 victory over Wigan in the 1923–24 Championship Final during the 1923–24 season, at The Cliff, Broughton, Salford on Saturday 3 May 1924, in front of a crowd of 13,729. Fowler played stand-off in Batley's 0–5 defeat by York in the 1922–23 Yorkshire Cup Final during the 1922–23 season at Headingley, Leeds on Saturday 2 December 1922, in front of a crowd of 33,719, and played scrum-half in the 8–9 defeat by Wakefield Trinity in the 1924–25 Yorkshire Cup Final during the 1924–25 season at Headingley, Leeds on Saturday 22 November 1924, in front of a crowd of 25,546.

== Officiating career ==
Ike Fowler was the touch judge for Castleford's 11–8 victory over Huddersfield in the 1934–35 Challenge Cup Final at Wembley Stadium, London on Saturday 4 May 1935, in front of a crowd of 39,000.

== Bibliography ==
- Godwin, Terry (1984). The International Rugby Championship 1883-1983. Grafton Street, London: Willow Books. ISBN 0-00-218060-X.
- Smith, David; Williams, Gareth (1980). Fields of Praise: The Official History of The Welsh Rugby Union. Cardiff: University of Wales Press. ISBN 0-7083-0766-3.
