= Mark Barlow =

English rugby league footballer

Personal information
- Full name: Mark Barlow
- Born: 16 February 1984 (age 41)

Playing information
- Position: Wing, Stand-off, Scrum-half, Hooker
Club
Years	Team	Pld	T	G	FG	P
2002	Wakefield Trinity
2003	Dewsbury Rams
2006	Halifax RLFC
2007–10	Batley Bulldogs
2011	York City Knights
2012	Dewsbury Rams
2017–18	Hemel Stags
2019	Keighley Cougars
	Total	0	0	0	0	0

Mark Barlow (born 16 February 1984) is a former professional rugby league footballer who played in the 2000s and 2010s. He played at club level in 2002's Super League VII for the Wakefield Trinity Wildcats, the Dewsbury Rams (two spells), Halifax, the Batley Bulldogs, the York City Knights, the Hemel Stags and the Keighley Cougars, as a wing, stand-off, scrum-half or hooker.

== Background ==
Mark Barlow is the grandson of the rugby league hooker who played in the 1960s for Wakefield Trinity; Peter Barlow.

== Playing career ==
Barlow announced his retirement from playing after the Keighley Cougar's last match of the 2019 season. Since March 2019 Barlow had been head coach of amateur side Shaw Cross Sharks. - until he became the assistant coach for professional side Batley Bulldogs.
