= Gary Thornton =

English rugby league footballer and coach (born 1963)

Personal information
- Full name: Gary Thornton
- Born: 9 March 1963 (age 63)

Playing information
- Position: Wing
Club
Years	Team	Pld	T	G	FG	P
1986–90	Wakefield Trinity	18	3	0	0	12
1988(loan)	→ Batley			0	0
1990–02	Batley	215	79	0	0	316
	Total	233	82	0	0	328

Coaching information
Club
Years	Team	Gms	W	D	L	W%
2003–09	Batley Bulldogs	0	0	0	0
2012–14	York City Knights	0	0	0	0
2015–17	Doncaster RLFC	0	0	0	0
2018–21	Hunslet RLFC	48	25	3	20	52
2023–	Rochdale Hornets	102	47	1	54	46
	Total	150	72	4	74	48
- Source: As of 4 November 2026

Gary Thornton (born 1963) is an English professional rugby league coach who is the head coach of the Rochdale Hornets in the RFL Championship.

He has previously coached at Hunslet RLFC and the Castleford Tigers U20s academy side from 2009 to 2012.

In September 2022 he was announced as the head coach of the Rochdale Hornets.

He was inducted into the Batley Bulldogs Hall of Fame in November 2025 having a 16 year association with the club as player, assistant coach and Head Coach.

== Playing career ==
As a player, he spent 4 seasons at Wakefield Trinity before joining Batley in 1990, after initially having a loan spell at 'The Mount' in the 1988–89 season. He went on to make 215 appearances for the club scoring 79 tries.

== Coaching career ==
Gary spent five and a half years as head coach at Batley from October 2003-April 2009(the longest serving Championship coach at the time), and also spent time as U21s coach at Wakefield Trinity.

Gary was Head Coach at York between 2012 and 2014, and Doncaster R.L.F.C. from June 2015 to May 2017.

Has won the coach of the year award in respective Championship divisions:

- 2006 – National League 1 (Now the Championship) Coach of the Year – Batley
- 2014 – Championship 1 Coach of the Year – York
