= Danny Maun =

English rugby league footballer

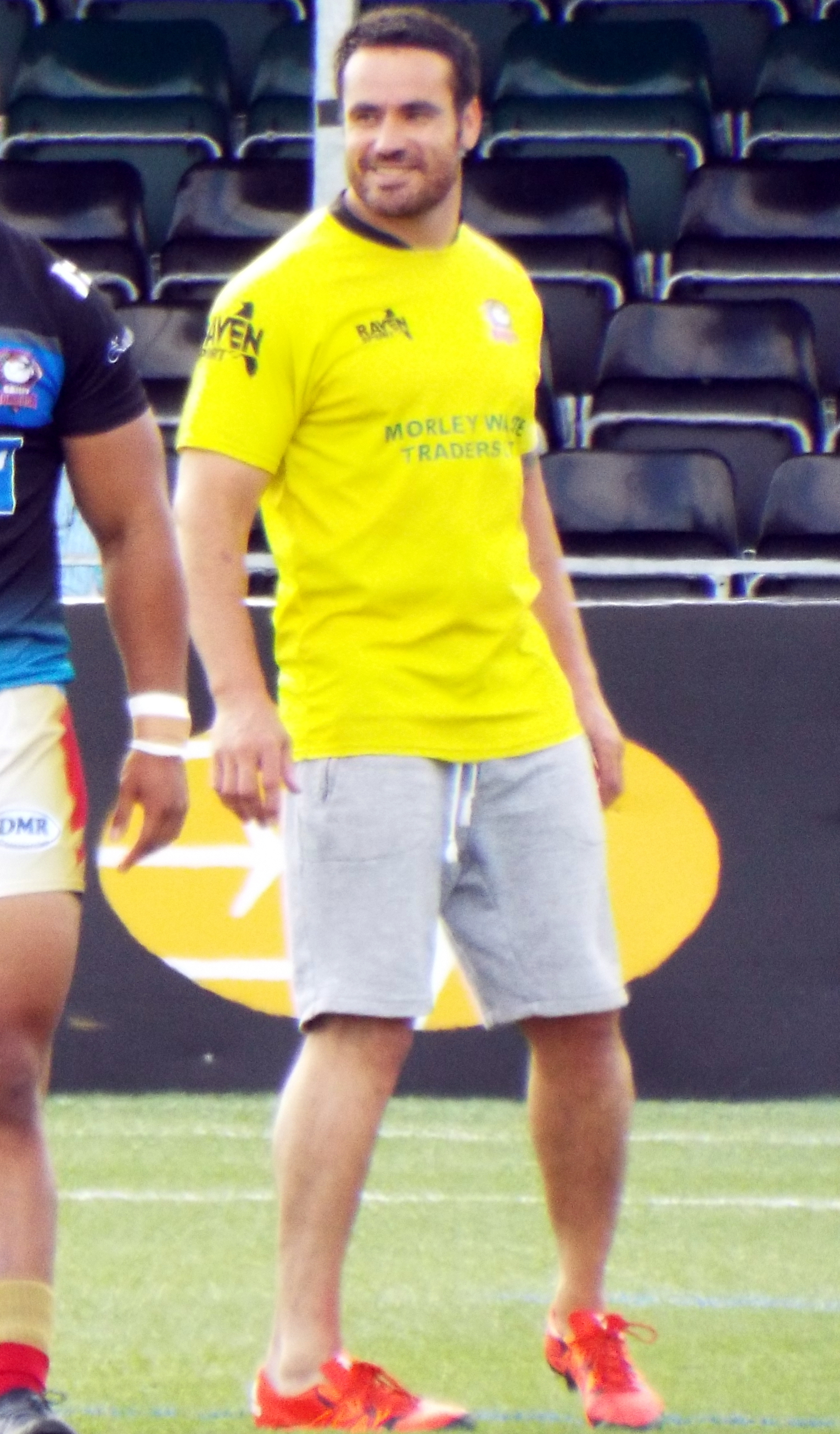

Personal information
- Full name: Daniel Wes Maun
- Born: 5 January 1981 (age 45) Dewsbury, West Yorkshire, England

Playing information
- Height: 5 ft 11 in (1.80 m)
- Weight: 15 st 0 lb (95 kg)
- Position: Centre
Club
| Years | Team | Pld | T | G | FG | P |
|---|---|---|---|---|---|---|
| 2000–04 | Batley Bulldogs | 117 | 46 | 0 | 0 | 184 |
| 2005 | Featherstone Rovers | 21 | 10 | 0 | 0 | 40 |
| 2005–07 | Dewsbury Rams | 55 | 27 | 0 | 0 | 108 |
| 2008–13 | Batley Bulldogs | 134 | 49 | 0 | 0 | 196 |
| 2014–15 | Hunslet Hawks | 54 | 17 | 0 | 0 | 68 |
| 2018 | Batley Bulldogs | 1 | 0 | 0 | 0 | 0 |
| | Total | 382 | 149 | 0 | 0 | 596 |

Danny Maun (born 5 January 1981, in Dewsbury, England) is an English former rugby league footballer. Maun plays for Hunslet Hawks in the Co-operative Championship 1. He previously played at Wigan, Featherstone Rovers and Dewsbury Rams.and Most notably Batley Bulldogs where he remains a fan favourite and playing 254 games.

Danny Maun's usual position is centre.

Danny Maun began his professional rugby career at Wigan Warriors before signing with Batley. In 2006 Maun won the Division 2 championship with Dewsbury and also in 2010 he won the northern rail cup with Batley and appeared in the 2013 Grand final Championship with the Batley Bulldogs. Maun re-signed with Batley for the 2008 season and in the 2010 season went on to win the Northern Rail Cup against Widnes Vikings 25–24. As of 2 October 2013, Danny Maun at the age of 32 registered with Hunslet Hawks who were just recently relegated to Kingstone Press Championship 1.

In 2025, Maun was inducted into the Batley Bulldogs Hall of Fame.

== Honours ==
- National League Two Runners-Up: 2005, with Dewsbury Rams
- National League Two Champions: 2006, with Dewsbury Rams
- Northern Rail Cup Champions: 2010, with Batley Bulldogs
- Kingstone Press Championship Grand Final Runners Up: 2013, with Batley Bulldogs

Dream team selection 2003 Championship 1 Grand final winner 2014 Hunslet Hawks
