= Dane Manning =

English rugby league footballer (born 1989)

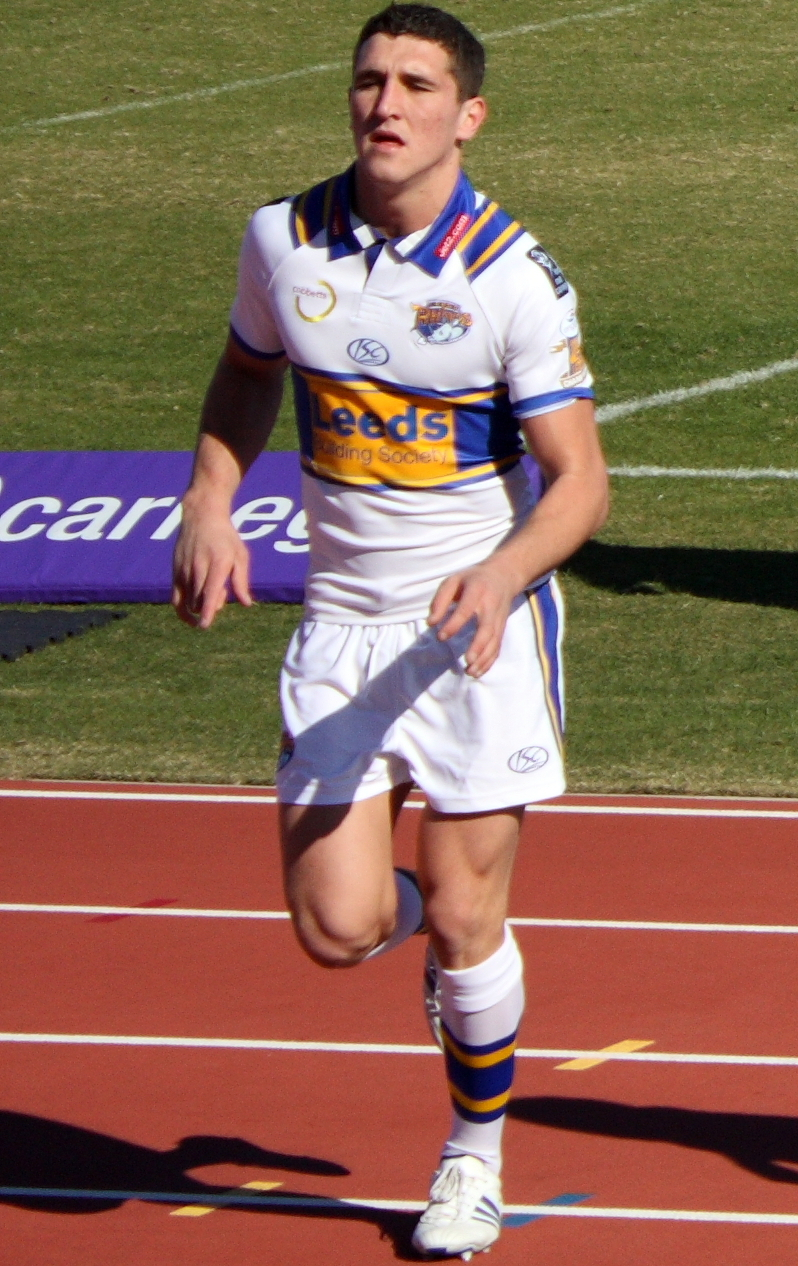

Personal information
- Born: 15 April 1989 (age 37) England
- Height: 6 ft 2 in (1.88 m)
- Weight: 15 st 13 lb (101 kg)

Playing information
- Position: Second-row
Club
Years	Team	Pld	T	G	FG	P
2009	Leeds Rhinos	1	0	0	0	0
2010	Featherstone Rovers	23	4	0	0	16
2011	Batley Bulldogs	27	9	0	0	36
2012–16	Halifax	129	40	0	0	160
2017–	Batley Bulldogs	232	52	0	0	208
	Total	412	105	0	0	420
- Source: As of 30 October 2025

Dane Manning (born 15 April 1989) is a professional rugby league footballer who plays as a second-row forward for the Batley Bulldogs in the Championship.

He previously played for the Leeds Rhinos in the Super League, and Featherstone Rovers, Batley Bulldogs and Halifax in the Championship.

== Career ==
Manning made one first team appearance for Leeds Rhinos in the 2009 Super League season, in a round 21 24–14 victory at home against Hull Kingston Rovers.
