= Marcus Walker (rugby league) =

English rugby league footballer

Personal information
- Full name: Marcus Walker
- Born: 12 August 2002 (age 24) Pocklington, East Riding of Yorkshire, England
- Height: 6 ft 0 in (1.82 m)
- Weight: 14 st 9 lb (93 kg)

Playing information
- Position: Centre
Club
Years	Team	Pld	T	G	FG	P
2021–22	Hull FC	1	0	0	0	0
2022(loan)	→ Whitehaven RLFC	13	1	0	0	4
2023	Newcastle Thunder	23	2	0	0	8
2024	Dewsbury Rams	23	0	0	0	0
2027–	Batley Bulldogs	0	0	0	0	0
	Total	60	3	0	0	12
- Source: As of 12 September 2026

Marcus Walker (born 12 August 2002) is an English professional rugby league footballer who plays as a centre for Batley Bulldogs in the RFL Championship.

He previously played for Hull FC in the Super League, and spent time on loan from Hull FC at Whitehaven in the Championship.

He made the personal move to Australia in later 2024.

== Playing career ==
=== Hull FC ===
In 2021 he made his Hull FC début in the Super League against the Catalans Dragons on 13 August 2021 after previously being named on the bench, but not playing for the home game against the Huddersfield Giants. In 2022 he had a loan spell at Whitehaven RLFC.

=== Dewsbury Rams ===
On 18 November 2023 he signed for Dewsbury Rams in the RFL Championship on a 1-year deal.

=== Wynnum Manly ===
On 28th February 2025 he was announced as part of the Wynnum Manly Seagulls Hostplus Cup squad for the 2025 season.

=== Batley Bulldogs ===
On 10 September 2026 it was reported that he had signed for Batley Bulldogs in the RFL Championship
