= Ben White (rugby league) =

Germany international rugby league footballer

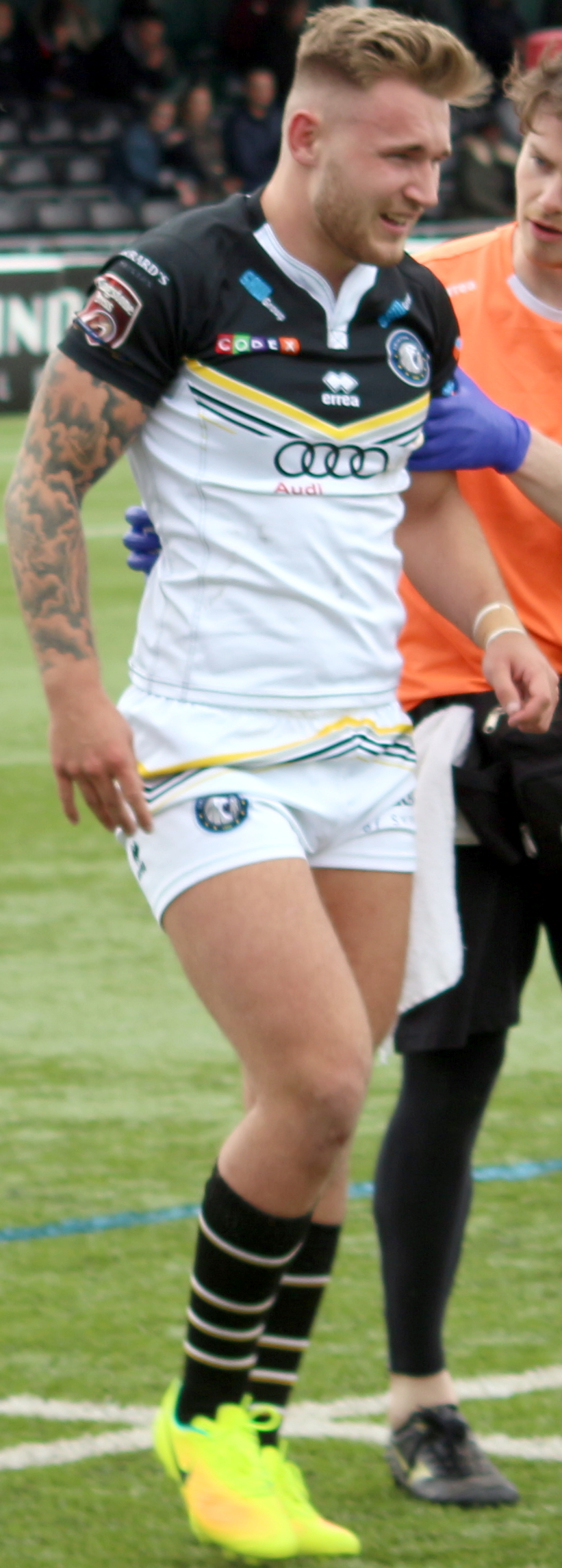

Personal information
- Full name: Benjamin White
- Born: 27 October 1994 (age 31) London, England
- Height: 184 cm (6 ft 0 in)
- Weight: 91 kg (14 st 5 lb)

Playing information
- Position: Scrum-half, Stand-off
Club
Years	Team	Pld	T	G	FG	P
2014	Leeds Rhinos	1	0	0	0	0
2014(loan)	→Gloucestershire All Golds	2	1	0	0	4
2015–17	Swinton Lions	66	28	13	1	139
2019	Halifax	12	1	1	1	7
2019	Barrow Raiders	10	0	1	0	2
2020–26	Batley Bulldogs	168	29	5	1	127
2027–	Rochdale Hornets	0	0	0	0	0
	Total	259	59	20	3	279
Representative
Years	Team	Pld	T	G	FG	P
2022	Germany	1	1	0	0	4
- Source: As of 21 September 2026

Ben White (born 27 October 1994) is an English professional rugby league footballer who plays as a scrum-half or stand-off for Rochdale Hornets in the RFL Championship.

He previously played for the Leeds Rhinos in the Super League, and on loan from Leeds at the Gloucestershire All Golds in League 1. White also played for the Swinton Lions in Championship 1 and the Championship, Halifax, Barrow Raiders and Batley Bulldogs in the Championship.

== Background ==
White was born in Hounslow, London, England.

== Playing career ==
White is an England Youth international. He was in the Leeds Rhinos Academy system and played his junior rugby league with the Saddleworth Rangers club.

=== Leeds Rhinos ===
In August 2014 White made his Super League début for Leeds in the defeat by the London Broncos. He has previously played on loan from the Rhinos at the Gloucestershire All Golds in 2014.

=== Swinton Lions ===
In 2015 he joined the Swinton Lions on a full-time deal. In 2015 he was nominated for the Kingstone Press League 1 Young Player of the Year.

=== Rochdale Hornets ===
On 21 September 2026 it was reported that he had signed for Rochdale Hornets in the RFL Championship
