= 1924–25 Yorkshire Cup =

- Structure: Regional knockout championship
- Teams: 16
- Winners: Wakefield Trinity
- Runners-up: Batley

The 1924–25 Yorkshire Cup was the seventeenth occasion on which the Yorkshire Cup competition was held. This year's final was between two local rivals, Wakefield Trinity, who won the trophy by beating Batley by the score of 9-8. The match was played at Headingley, Leeds, now in West Yorkshire. The attendance was 25,546 and receipts were £1,912.

== Background ==
The Rugby Football League's Yorkshire Cup competition was a knock-out competition between (mainly professional) rugby league clubs from the county of Yorkshire. The actual area was at times increased to encompass other teams from outside the county such as Newcastle, Mansfield, Coventry, and even London (in the form of Acton & Willesden.

The Rugby League season always (until the onset of "Summer Rugby" in 1996) ran from around August-time through to around May-time and this competition always took place early in the season, in the Autumn, with the final taking place in (or just before) December (The only exception to this was when disruption of the fixture list was caused during, and immediately after, the two World Wars).

== Competition and results ==
This season there were again two junior/amateur clubs taking part, Wyke and Castleford. The number of entries remained at last year's "full house" total of sixteen again obviating the necessity of having byes.

=== Round 1 ===
Involved 5 matches (with three byes) and 13 clubs

Game No	Fixture date	Home team	Score	Away team	Venue	Ref
1	Sat 11 Oct 1924	Bramley	5–9	Dewsbury	Barley Mow	
2	Sat 11 Oct 1924	Huddersfield	18–18	Batley	Fartown	
3	Sat 11 Oct 1924	Hull Kingston Rovers	45–0	Halifax	Craven Park (1)	
4	Sat 11 Oct 1924	Hunslet	2–11	York	Parkside	
5	Sat 11 Oct 1924	Keighley	13–0	Bradford Northern	Lawkholme Lane	
6	Sat 11 Oct 1924	Leeds	24–10	Castleford (Note: Castleford were at that time a junior club. They joined the league for season 1926–27)	Headingley	
7	Sat 11 Oct 1924	Wakefield Trinity	20–8	Hull	Belle Vue	
8	Sat 11 Oct 1924	Wyke (Note: Wyke are a junior/amateur club from Wyke, near Bradford)	3-19	Featherstone Rovers	venue unknown	

=== Round 1 - replays ===
Involved 1 match and 2 clubs

Game No	Fixture date	Home team	Score	Away team	Venue	Ref
R	Tue 14 Oct 1924	Batley	12–3	Huddersfield	Mount Pleasant	

=== Round 2 – quarterfinals ===
Involved 4 matches and 8 clubs

Game No	Fixture date	Home team	Score	Away team	Venue	Ref
1	Sat 25 Oct 1924	Featherstone Rovers	2–13	Batley	Post Office Road	
2	Sat 25 Oct 1924	Hull Kingston Rovers	16–0	York	Craven Park (1)	
3	Sat 25 Oct 1924	Keighley	5–8	Wakefield Trinity	Lawkholme Lane	
4	Sat 25 Oct 1924	Leeds	24–4	Dewsbury	Headingley	

=== Round 3 – semifinals ===
Involved 2 matches and 4 clubs

Game No	Fixture date	Home team	Score	Away team	Venue	Ref
1	Sat 08 Nov 1924	Hull Kingston Rovers	8–10	Batley	Craven Park (1)	
2	Sat 08 Nov 1924	Leeds	4–5	Wakefield Trinity	Headingley	

=== Final ===
Game No	Fixture date	Home team	Score	Away team	Venue	Att	Rec	Ref
	Saturday 22 November 1924	Wakefield Trinity	9–8	Batley	Headingley (Note: Headingley is the home ground of Leeds RLFC with a capacity of 21,000. The record attendance was 40,175 for a league match between Leeds and Bradford Northern on 21 May 1947.)	25,546	£1,912	

==== Teams and scorers ====
Wakefield Trinity	№	Batley
	teams	
Len Abraham(s)	1	Joseph "Joe" Robinson
C. A. "Charlie" Pollard	2	John Cyril Stacey
Billy Batten	3	George Davidge (Note: The initial is given as "A Davidge" in the book "100 Years of Rugby. The History of Wakefield Trinity 1873–1973")
Peter Reid	4	Harry Rees
Edward "Ned" Thomas	5	J. Kirkby
Thomas "Tommy" Pickup	6	William "Willie" Scott
Jonathan "Jonty" Parkin (c)	7	Isaac "Ike" John Fowler
Bernard P Gould	8	Alonza Brook
Robert "Bob" White	9	Jack Leeming
Ernest W. Blower	10	Jack W. Smith
Thomas Gibson	11	Fred Carter
William "Bill" Horton	12	George Douglas
C H "Charlie" Glossop	13	Frank Gallagher
??	Coach	??
9	score	8
5	HT	8
	Scorers	
	Tries	
Jonathan "Jonty" Parkin (1)	T	2
	T	
	Goals	
C. A. "Charlie" Pollard (2)	G	1
Jonathan "Jonty" Parkin (1)	G	
	Drop Goals	
	DG	
Referee		unknown

Scoring - Try = three (3) points - Goal = two (2) points - Drop goal = two (2) points

=== The road to success ===
First round
Leeds	24
Castleford	10
Bramley	5
Dewsbury	9
Keighley	13
Bradford Northern	0
Wakefield Trinity	20
Hull	8
Hull Kingston Rovers	45
Halifax	0
Hunslet	2
York	11
Wyke	3
Featherstone Rovers	19
Huddersfield	18 (3)
Batley	18 (12)

Second round
Leeds	24
Dewsbury	4
Keighley	5
Wakefield Trinity	8
Hull Kingston Rovers	16
York	0
Featherstone Rovers	2
Batley	13

Semifinals
Leeds	4
Wakefield Trinity	5
Hull Kingston Rovers	8
Batley	10

Final
Wakefield Trinity	9
Batley	8

== See also ==
- 1924–25 Northern Rugby Football League season
- Rugby league county cups
