= Harry Rees (rugby league) =

Wales international rugby league footballer

Henry Robert "Harry" Rees
Personal information
- Born: Wales

Playing information
- Position: Centre
Club
Years	Team	Pld	T	G	FG	P
≤1923–≥25	Batley
Representative
Years	Team	Pld	T	G	FG	P
1923–25	Wales	2	1			3

Henry Robert "Harry" Rees (21 September 1899 – 25 June 1953) was a Welsh professional rugby league footballer who played in the 1920s. He originally came from Loughor near Gorseinon in Glamorgan. He played at representative level for Wales, and at club level for Batley, as a centre. After retiring he ran the Bath Hotel in Batley until his death in 1953.

== Playing career ==
=== International honours ===
Harry Rees won caps for Wales while at Batley in 1923, and in 1925.

=== Championship final appearances ===
Harry Rees played at centre in Batley's 13–7 victory over Wigan in the 1923–24 Championship Final during the 1923–24 season, at The Cliff, Broughton, Salford on Saturday 3 May 1924, in front of a crowd of 13,729.

=== County Cup Final appearances ===
Harry Rees played at centre in Batley's 0–5 defeat by York in the 1922–23 Yorkshire Cup Final during the 1922–23 season at Headingley, Leeds on Saturday 2 December 1922, in front of a crowd of 33,719, and played at centre in the 8–9 defeat by Wakefield Trinity in the 1924–25 Yorkshire Cup Final during the 1924–25 season at Headingley, Leeds on Saturday 22 November 1924, in front of a crowd of 25,546.

== Notes ==
"The British Rugby League Records Book" has separate entries for H. R. Davies, and Harry Rees. Other sources combine these entries. However, it is not known whether this persons' full name is actually Harry Rees Davies.
