= Harry Rees (rugby union) =

- Full name: Henry Tudor Rees
- Born: 9 May 1908 Pontypridd, Wales
- Died: 3 June 1978 (aged 70) Pentyrch, Wales

Rugby union career
- Position: Forward
International career
Years	Team	Apps	(Points)
1937–38	Wales	5	(0)

Henry Tudor Rees (9 May 1908 – 3 June 1978) was a Welsh international rugby union player.

Born in Pontypridd, Rees was a police officer and played rugby for Town RFC while posted at Aberdare. He subsequently joined Cardiff RFC and also competed for the British Police XV.

Rees gained five Wales caps, as a second row forward in the 1937 Home Nations, before being moved to the front row for the 1938 Home Nations. A contentious scrummaging infraction he conceded in the final two minutes of a 1938 match at Murrayfield gave Scotland a winning penalty kick, en route to them claiming the triple crown.

== See also ==
- List of Wales national rugby union players
