= David Cox (rugby league) =

Australian rugby league footballer

Personal information
- Full name: David Cox
- Born: 10 June 1974 (age 52)

Playing information
- Position: Second-row, Prop
Club
Years	Team	Pld	T	G	FG	P
1995	Canberra	7	0	0	0	0
1996–97	Illawarra	12	1	0	0	4
1998–99	Canberra	7	1	0	0	4
	Total	26	2	0	0	8
- Source: As of 30 January 2023

David Cox is an Australian former professional rugby league footballer who played in the 1990s. He played for Canberra and Illawarra in the ARL/NRL competitions.

== Playing career ==
Cox made his first grade debut for Canberra in round 2 of the 1995 ARL season against Penrith at Bruce Stadium. Cox played off the interchange bench in Canberra's 34-12 victory. After one season with Canberra, Cox signed for Illawarra. In round 12 of the 1997 ARL season, Cox scored his first try in the top grade during a 28-28 draw with South Sydney. Cox returned to Canberra ahead of the 1998 NRL season. He would go on to make another seven appearances for the club before being released at the end of 1999. Cox played a total of 26 games in first grade with all of them coming off the interchange bench.
