= Rochdale Hornets =

English rugby league club

Rochdale Hornets RLFC

Club information
- Full name: Rochdale Hornets Rugby League Football Club
- Nickname: Hornets
- Colours: Red, white and blue
- Founded: 1871; 155 years ago
- Website: hornetsrugbyleague.co.uk

Current details
- Ground: Crown Oil Arena (10,249)
- CEO: Matt Rigby
- Chairman: Andy Mazey
- Coach: Gary Thornton
- Captain: Ross Whitmore
- Competition: Championship
- 2026 season: 15th
- Current season

Uniforms
Home colours	Away colours

Records
- Minor premierships: 2 (2013 2016)
- Challenge Cups: 1 (1922)

The Rochdale Hornets are a professional rugby league club from Rochdale, Greater Manchester, England, competing in the Championship, the second tier of British rugby league. The Rochdale Hornets are one of the original twenty-two rugby clubs that formed the Northern Rugby Football Union in 1895, making them one of the world's first rugby league clubs. Their main local rivals are Oldham, Salford Red Devils, Swinton Lions, Halifax and the Huddersfield Giants.

== History ==
=== Early years – the 19th century ===
A Rochdale Athletic Club was formed in 1866 and held its first festival on the cricket ground at Merefield. Rugby football first took place as an organised game about 1866 or 1867, when the Rochdale Football Club was formed by a magistrate and numerous business owners and self-employed men. Within a year they were all playing alongside new members when working-class men were allowed to join as well. Other clubs quickly followed, among them Rochdale Wasps and Rochdale Juniors.

In 1871, Rochdale Juniors and Rakebank merged to form Rochdale United. On 20 April 1871, the directors of Rochdale Wasps, Rochdale United and Rochdale Football Club met at the Roebuck Hotel in the town centre to form a senior team that would represent the town. Rochdale Wasps. Rochdale Butterflies and Rochdale Grasshoppers were suggested as names for the new club before Rochdale Hornets was agreed on. The original team colours were amber and black.

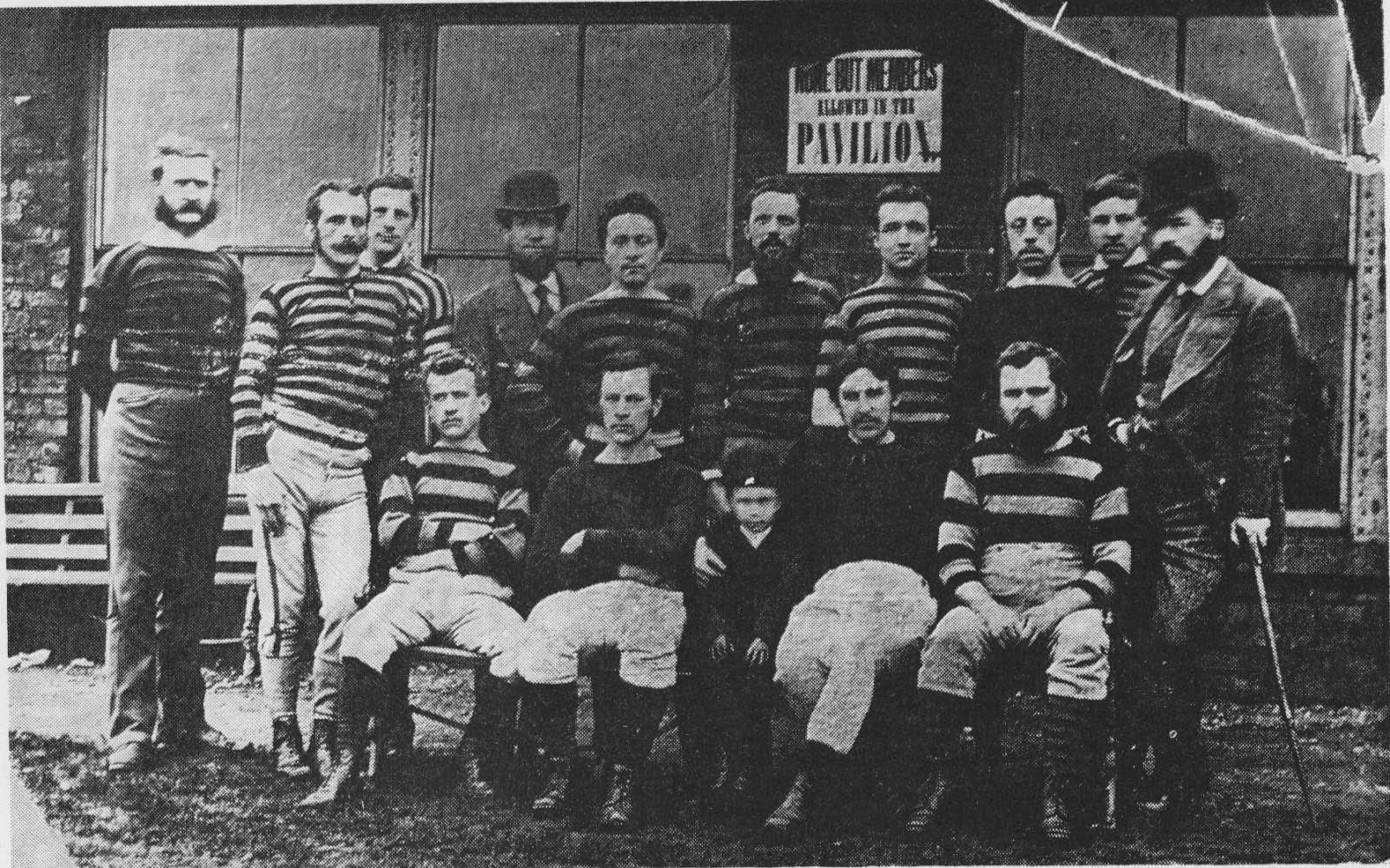
Rochdale Hornets team of 1875

In 1875, Hornets played at Mr R. Kershaw's Athletic Grounds in Vavasour Street, and later at Rochdale Cricket Ground. The club very quickly took a leading position in the game in Lancashire. Hornets had an open door approach to membership and were able to insist on gate money as they played on an enclosed field.

In June 1879, Rochdale Rovers threw in their lot with the Hornets, and it was in this year that the club first adopted the white jersey. A ground was taken at Oakenrod for the 1879–80 season but owing to poor gates, Rochdale Hornets returned to Rochdale Cricket Club ground.

In 1881, no fewer than 57 rugby clubs played in Rochdale and district, fielding 80 teams regularly. By the 1890s, the players were almost all working class.

Rochdale moved to the Athletic Grounds in Milnrow Road, which opened on 9 June 1894. Their first game at their new home took place in September 1894 against Crompton.

They were founder members of the Northern Union in 1895. Hornets made a poor start under the new regime and finished bottom of the league table, for a good number of years they lost many more matches than they won.

=== Early 20th century ===
They became tenants of the Athletics Grounds in 1900. Between the 7–9 March 1901, a three-day bazaar was held at the town hall where around £1,000 was raised to help pay for the club's debts. Incidents from the game played on 22 March 1901 resulted in the ground being suspended by the Northern Union.

The players went on strike on 29 March 1902 as empty coffers meant that they went unpaid.

Rochdale Hornets then refused to travel to Dewsbury on 1 October 1904 on account of a smallpox outbreak, and were subsequently fined £20.

Rochdale purchased the Athletics Grounds in 1913. Hornets won the Lancashire County Cup in 1911 and 1914. Between 10 October 1914 and 6 March 1915, Hornets played 25 games without defeat, shortly after this streak was broken by a defeat by Wigan but they would finish fourth in the table. Hornets beat Broughton Moor 75–13 in a cup-tie on 13 March 1915; it was their biggest margin of victory since 1871. Twenty-five Rochdale players enlisted for the First World War, three of whom are known to have died, Sergeant Twigg, Archie Field (Arras 1917) and Walter Roman (Somme 1916) (Rochdale Captain).

Rugby League came back to Rochdale following the Great War on Christmas Day 1918 when Rochdale played a friendly game. In the half-season of the spring of 1919, Rochdale Hornets not only won the Lancashire League but also carried off the Lancashire County Cup.

Rochdale's biggest win against a senior club came on 27 March 1920 when Wakefield Trinity were beaten 64-nil.

The annual Law Cup, then known as the Infirmaries' Cup, was first contested against neighbours Oldham on 7 May 1921. Hornets played six games in a fortnight before falling to their biggest ever defeat 79–2 at the hands of Hull FC. Hornets changed their colours from green and black to red, white and blue as the green and black strip was deteriorating in the wash.

The club's record attendance was set at 26,664 in 1922 when Oldham were the visitors for a third round Challenge Cup match. Hornets won the Northern Union Challenge Cup in 1922 by beating Hull 10–9 at Headingley, Leeds.That was Hornets' one and only Challenge Cup final. Due to the ferocity of their play, their pack of forwards was known as "the Terrible Six".

Hornets were formed into a limited company on 31 May 1929.

On 4 October 1930, Stanley Baldwin, Hornets' winger was fatally injured during a match with Oldham.

Owing to a financial crisis in 1931, the Athletic Ground was offered for sale and all the players put on the transfer list. A fire destroyed the stadium's main stand, dressing rooms and offices on 18 September 1935. A new stand, built over the ashes of the old, was opened on Saturday 7 March 1936 for the match against Liverpool Stanley. Another financial crisis in 1938 led to further talks about selling the ground and a further crisis in 1939 resulted in the creation of a members' club.

Hornets dropped out of the wartime Lancashire League, their last match a 12–4 defeat against Salford at the Athletic Grounds on 11 May 1940.

=== Post-war ===
An appeal went out to supporters in July 1945 for help in renovating the ground, pitch and premises so that rugby league could restart at the Athletic Grounds after the war. On 25 August 1945, Hornets resumed with an away game at Craven Park, Barrow which they lost 5–14. The first Infirmaries' Cup game since 1938 was played at the Athletic Grounds on 24 August 1946, in which Hornets were beaten by Oldham.

On 29 March 1947, Hornets ended a run of 14 consecutive defeats with a 3–0 home win over Halifax. Hornets played in green and black for the first time in 26 years on 13 December 1947 in a match against Wigan. Thereafter they used the colours as a change strip in the event of a colour clash.

In 1947 and 1958, Rochdale Hornets made it to the semi-finals of the Challenge Cup, but both times Wigan ended their hopes of a Wembley Final.

On 24 October 1953, Hornets' second row Ralph Slater was fatally injured in an A-team game at the Athletic Grounds against Oldham A.

Rochdale's highest attendance in a league match was set on Saturday, 16 October 1954 when Hornets lost 4–18 to local rivals Oldham in front of 19,654 spectators. Hornets played their first game at Spotland in 1954 when a one-off game against Keighley was played there.

Rochdale Hornets brought in a Fijian contingent in the early 1960s, starting with Orisi Dawai and Josefa Levula in 1961 and, later Apisai Toga. This has resulted in Rochdale having the largest Fijian community in the UK, outside of London.

In 1965, Hornets appeared in the final of the Lancashire County Cup when a 19,000 crowd saw them lose to Warrington at Knowsley Road, St. Helens.

Frank Myler arrived at Hornets in May 1971 to take up the position of player-coach with the Rochdale Hornets from May 1971. They reached a Players No 6 Final in 1974. Myler left Hornets in October 1974.

Kel Coslett was coach between 1976 and 1979.

=== 1980s and early 1990s ===
In the 1980s, things took a turn for the worse with the crowds virtually disappearing.

Eric Hughes coached Rochdale for the 1987–88 season. In 1987 both Rochdale Hornets and Rochdale A.F.C. were in financial trouble. Hornets were banned from signing players in November after failing to pay a transfer fee. Deep in debt, Rochdale accepted Morrisons £2.7m offer for the Athletic Grounds and following the sale of the land, moved to Rochdale A.F.C.'s stadium in the Spotland area of the town at the end of the 1988 season. The stadium became jointly owned by Hornets, Rochdale Council and Rochdale A.F.C. In October 1988, Rochdale were saved by the local council with a £60,000 loan.

In 1989, Hornets were promoted from the Second Division to the top tier. The club's record attendance at Spotland was set at 8,150 when Hornets played Oldham on Boxing Day 1989.

In September 1990, Neil Holding briefly coached Hornets.

In 1991, Hornets appeared in the final of the Lancashire Cup.

=== Summer era ===
On 9 May 1996, Rochdale sacked their coach, Steve Gibson, after taking just one point from their first six games of the First Division season.

Deryck Fox became player-coach in May 1998, and made an immediate impact. A ten-match losing sequence was ended as Hornets won at Featherstone Rovers in Fox's first match in charge. However, Hornets ended that 1998 campaign in next to bottom position in Division One.

In October 1998, Karl Marriott died following a training session and a couple of months later Roy Powell died in similar circumstances. Hornets struggled early in the campaign when they occupied bottom spot for a couple of weeks. They recovered slightly and had moved up to 15th position, fourth bottom, by late June.

On 30 June 1999, it was announced that Deryck Fox was no longer Rochdale's coach. During his 13 months as Hornets' coach, the club played 38 matches. They won 12, drew one and lost the remaining 25. Bob Eccles took over as caretaker coach.

Steve Linnane became head coach in December 1999 but quit in June 2000 to become assistant coach at Super League club Halifax.

Steve Deakin joined Rochdale Hornets as head coach in August 2000 before rejoining Keighley as head coach in September 2000 when incumbent Karl Harrison left to become assistant coach at Bradford.

Martin Hall took up the position of coach at Rochdale Hornets in November 2000. He stepped in after the shock resignation of Steve Deakin who returned to Keighley after a few months in charge. He took Rochdale to two consecutive third-place finishes in the Northern Ford Premiership. Hall departed along with all the players after not renewing his contract after his failed bid to take over the club.

Bobbie Goulding arrived as player-coach in December 2003. He was in charge of Rochdale Hornets for two seasons, twice being nominated for coach of the year. He left in November 2005, citing frustration at the club's financial problems and his lack of a proper contract.

On 13 March 2005, Hornets set an all-time Rugby League record when they defeated the amateur side Illingworth 120–4 in the Challenge Cup. This is the highest score ever achieved by a team in the cup. The biggest winning margin is still that of Huddersfield, who beat the amateur side Swinton Park 119–2 in 1914.

Darren Abram was appointed head coach two weeks later. Abram was dismissed on 9 July 2007 after a run of defeats which left the club facing relegation. Shaun Gartland was placed in temporary charge.

Bobbie Goulding was appointed as Rochdale Hornets coach for the second time in September 2007 and relieved of his duties in May 2008 after a run of six consecutive losses.

Darren Shaw was appointed as Rochdale Hornets coach in May 2008 after a previous spell as assistant coach under Bobbie Goulding in his first spell as player coach in 2003.

On 13 January 2009, shareholders voted to put Rochdale Hornets into administration after debts ordered by HM Revenue and Customs accumulated £55,000. An Industrial and Provident Society (a co-operative) was created and recognised by the Rugby Football League, and the Hornets were re-founded. The co-operative was initially created around a core of loyal fans, and membership is open to all. The co-op operates on a one-member, one-vote principle.

Darren Shaw departed the club at the end of the 2009 season and was replaced by ex St Helens player John Stankevitch in early November 2009.

Stankevitch was given the difficult task of recruiting a competitive squad of players from those available that had not already been recruited elsewhere and a slow start to the 2010 Northern Rail Cup followed.

However, the club went on to exceed all expectations and finish 5th in the table giving them a play-off position for the first time in years. The team were eventually eliminated in the semi-finals of the competition.

Stankevitch signed a new contract in July 2010 in preparation for the 2011 and 2012 seasons, and began the club's re-emergence with the recontracting of the majority of his squad.

In 2013 Rochdale Hornets appointed Ian Talbot as head coach. In a successful spell Talbot led Hornets to their first trophy in 91 years when they won the Kingstone Press Championship 1 play-off final defeating local rivals Oldham at Leigh Sports Village. Ian Talbot stood down as head coach at Hornets at the end of the 2015 season to take up a position at St. Helens.

Talbot's replacement was Alan Kilshaw who had had a successful stint coaching in Australia.

In Alan Kilshaws 1st season (2016) Rochdale Hornets defeated Toulouse Olympique XIII in the promotion final in Toulouse, France to become Kingstone Press League 1 Champions. This was the 1st time Rochdale Hornets had been Champions of a division since 1919, a gap of 97 years. In the three year period of 2013 to 2016 Hornets had their best trophy winning period since the inter-war years.

Having successfully retained Championship status in (2017) Rochdale Hornets again avoided relegation in (2018) due to the lifeline of a league restructure. The club sadly struggled to sustain its position in the second tier winning just one league game all season and finally succumbed to relegation at the end of a turbulent (2019). During the 2019 season Hornets recruited a new coaching team which saw the return of former player Matt Calland as head coach.

In the closed season the club looked into changes of its co-operative ownership model. CEO Steve Kerr who had been mandated to seek investment approached former Swinton Lions Chairman Andy Mazey. Following a series of talks Mazey headed up a consortium to include club president Paul Ormerod, and his former Swinton associates Tony Sheridan, Richard Hayes and Peter Smith. A proposal to take over the club and convert it back into private ownership was tabled and a special resolution passed on 23 December 2019 to change the business model after a number of presentations and supporter engagement sessions.

In June 2020 it was announced the conversion of Rochdale Hornets RLFC Society Ltd (IPS) to Rochdale Hornets RLFC Ltd (PLC) has formally completed.

The return of former player Matt Calland as head coach proved to unsuccessful with Calland leaving the club in August 2022 to be replaced by his assistant Coach Gary Thornton.

== Stadiums ==
=== 1894–1988: Athletic Grounds ===
Rochdale moved to the Athletic Grounds in 1894. Their first game at their new home took place in September 1894 against Crompton. Between 1896 and 1900, Rochdale Association Football Club played at the Athletics Grounds. Hornets became tenants of the ground in 1900 and purchased the ground in 1913.

The highest attendance at the Athletic Grounds was the 1924 Challenge Cup final between Oldham and Wigan when 41,831 saw Wigan win 21–4.

Hornets borrowed £3,000 from the Rugby Football League in 1954 to build a new covered outer boundary wall and new turnstiles for the main entrance and Waithlands. The highest attendance for a league match was set on Saturday 16 October 1954, Hornets lost 4–18 to local rivals Oldham in front of 19,654 spectators. In 1987 both Rochdale Hornets and Rochdale A.F.C. were in financial trouble. First to receive an offer for their ground, Hornets accepted Morrison's £2.6m offer for the Athletic Grounds and, following the sale of the land bought a half share in Rochdale A.F.C.'s Spotland Stadium, thus saving both clubs.

=== 1988-present: Spotland Stadium ===
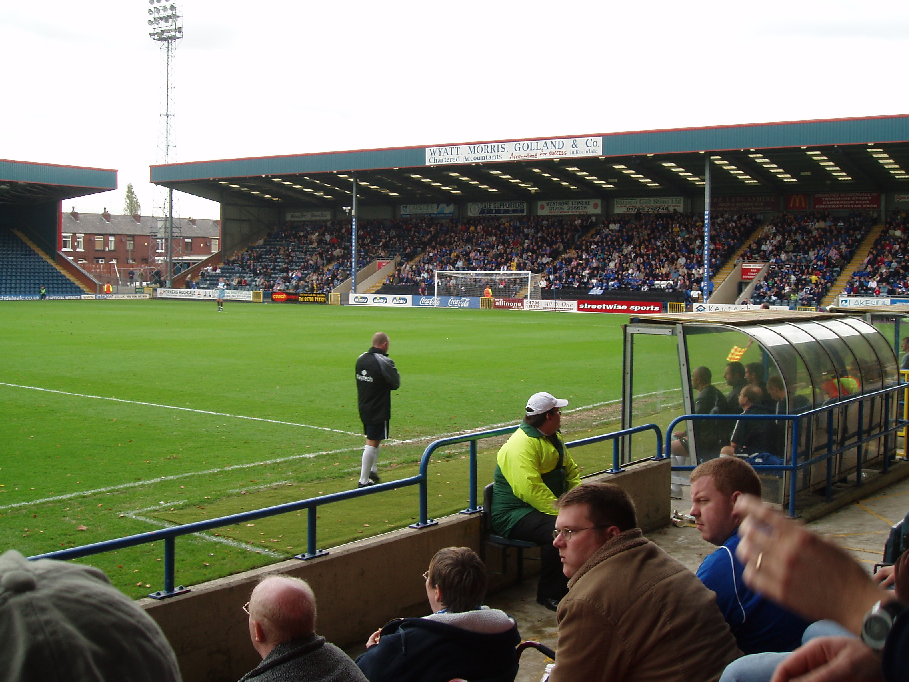

Spotland Stadium is a sports venue located at Willbutts Lane in the Spotland suburb of Rochdale, Greater Manchester. It is currently home to Rochdale A.F.C. and Rochdale Hornets R.F.L.C. It has a capacity of 10,249. The ground has four stands: the Co-Operative Stand (or Main Stand), the Thwaites Beer Stand (the Sandy Lane End), the T.D.S Stand (Pearl Street end) and the Westrose Leisure Stand (the Willbutts Lane Stand). All are fully seated, apart from the Sandy Lane End, which is a small terrace behind one of the goals.

== 2027 squad ==
2027 Rochdale Hornets Squad
First team squad			Coaching staff
(England) TJ Boyd – FB; (England) Alex Chippendale – WG; (England) Jamie Dallimore (vc) – SO, SH; (Jamaica) Jayden Dayes – PR; (England) Dan Hackney – SR; (England) Lewis Hatton – PR, SR; (England) Joe Hickey – SH; (New Zealand) Mark Ioane – PR, SR; (England) Sam Littler – SR, CE; (Democratic Republic of the Congo) Samy Kibula – PR, SR	(Ireland) Lachi Lanskey – SR; (England) Ryan Millar – WG, FB; (England) Jordan Paga – SH, SO, HK; (England) Dylan Proud – CE, WG; (England) Harry Ratcliffe – CE; (Samoa) Junior Sa'u (vc) – CE, WG; (England) Peter Scott – PR; (England) Harry Sheridan – FB, WG, CE	(England) Jack Twigg – SH, SO; (England) Matty Unsworth – SR; (England) Luke Waterworth – HK; (Ireland) Oli Whitford – CE, WG, FB; (Germany) Ben White – SO, CE, SH; (Scotland) Ross Whitmore (c) – HK; (England) Ethan Wood – SR	Head coach: (England) Gary Thornton; Assistant coach: (Samoa) Krisnan Inu; Legend: (c) Captain(s); (vc) Vice-captain(s); Updated: Source(s): https://www.hornetsrugbyleague.co.uk/teams/mens

== 2027 transfers ==
=== Gains ===
Player	From	Contract	Date
(England) Dylan Proud	Keighley Cougars	1 year	17 September 2026
(Ireland) Oli Whitford	Keighley Cougars	1 year	13 October 2026
(Ireland) Lachi Lanskey	Keighley Cougars	1 year	28 October 2026
(Germany) Ben White	Batley Bulldogs	1 year	21 September 2026
(England) Harry Ratcliffe	Wakefield Trinity	2 years	23 September 2026
(England) Jack Twigg	Huddersfield Giants	1 year	25 September 2026
(Democratic Republic of the Congo) Samy Kibula	Swinton Lions	1 year	27 September 2026
(England) Peter Scott	Leigh Leopards	1 year	30 September 2026
(England) Sam Littler	Oldham	1 year	15 October 2026
(England) Ryan Millar	Sheffield Eagles	1 year	30 October 2026

=== Losses ===
Player	To	Contract	Date
(England) Jack Hansen	Widnes Vikings	2 years	9 September 2026
(England) Dan Nixon	Widnes Vikings	1 year	9 September 2026
(Jamaica) Isaac Coleman	Keighley Cougars	1 year	10 October 2026
(England) Jay Scriven	Keighley Cougars	1 year	20 October 2026
(England) Max Flanagan	Oldham	1 year	12 October 2026
(England) Chris Barratt			6 November 2026
(England) Ben Metcalfe			6 November 2026
(England) George Roby			6 November 2026
(England) Jordan Syme			6 November 2026
(England) Bailey Pemberton	Newcastle Thunder	1 year	6 November 2026

=== Retired ===
Player	Date
(Jamaica) Jordan Andrade	28 August 2026
(England) Tom Ashton	28 August 2026

== Players ==
- For all Rochdale Hornets players with a Wikipedia article see Category:Rochdale Hornets players.

== Coaches ==
Also see Category:Rochdale Hornets coaches

- Trevor Hall (1936?)
- Jim Sullivan (1958 – 1961)
- Joe Warham
- Frank Myler (May 1971 – October 1974)
- Graham Starkey (October 1974 – November 1975)
- Henry Delooze (November 1975 – November 1976)
- Kel Coslett (November 1976 – August 1979)
- Paul Longstaff (September 1979 – May 1981)
- Terry Fogerty (May 1981 – January 1982)
- Dick Bonser (January 1982 – May 1982)
- Bill Kirkbride (June 1982 – September 1984)
- Charlie Birdsall (September 1984 – April 1986)
- Eric Fitzsimons (June 1986 – June 1987)
- Eric Hughes (June 1987 – June 1988)
- Jim Crellin (June 1988 – June 1989)
- Allan Agar (July 1989 – January 1991)
- Brian Juliff – Agar's assistant 1 game in Jan 1991
  (42–0 at Castleford)
- Neil Holding (January 1991 – April 1991)
- Stan Gittins (April 1991 – January 1993)
- Peter Regan (January 1993 – October 1993)
- Steve Gibson (October 1993 – May 1996)
- Shane Tupaea (May 1996 – April 1998)
- Deryck Fox (May 1998 – June 1999)
- Bob Eccles (July 1999 - November 1999)
- Steve Linnane (December 1999 – June 2000)
- Steve Deakin (August 2000 – October 2000)
- Martin Hall (November 2000 – November 2003)
- Bobbie Goulding (December 2003 – November 2005)
- Darren Abram (November 2005 – July 2007)
- Shaun Gartland (July 2007 – September 2007)
- Bobbie Goulding (September 2007 – May 2008)
- Darren Shaw (May 2008 – October 2009)
- John Stankevitch (October 2009 – October 2012)
- Ian Talbot (October 2012 – September 2015)
- Alan Kilshaw (October 2015 – 2019)
- Carl Forster (2019)
- Matt Calland (2019–2022)
- Gary Thornton (2023–present)

== Seasons ==
=== Super League era ===
Season	League									Play-offs	Challenge Cup	Other competitions		Name	Tries	Name	Points
Season	Division	P	W	D	L	F	A	Pts	Pos	Play-offs	Challenge Cup	Other competitions		Top try scorer		Top point scorer	
1996	Division One	20	2	2	16	348	602	6	10th		R5						
1997	Division Two	20	15	0	5	680	347	30	2nd		R4						
1998	Division One	30	6	1	23	571	912	13	10th		R4						
1999	Northern Ford Premiership	28	9	0	19	539	724	18	15th		R4						
2000	Northern Ford Premiership	28	10	0	18	563	696	20	13th		R5						
2001	Northern Ford Premiership	28	21	0	7	865	433	42	3rd		R5						
2002	Northern Ford Premiership	27	19	1	7	809	582	39	3rd		R4						
2003	National League One	18	13	0	5	647	477	26	3rd	Lost in Semi-final	R4						
2004	National League One	18	7	1	10	472	587	15	8th		R4						
2005	National League One	18	9	1	8	468	502	19	6th	Lost in Elimination Playoffs	R4						
2006	National League One	18	8	0	10	462	435	16	5th	Lost in Elimination Playoffs	R5						
2007	National League One	18	3	0	15	302	700	10	9th		R5						
2008	National League Two	22	10	1	11	715	610	36	7th		R4						
2009	Championship 1	18	6	0	12	500	557	15	8th		R5						
2010	Championship 1	20	10	0	10	630	498	37	5th	Lost in Semi-final	R3						
2011	Championship 1	20	12	0	8	652	498	40	4th	?	R4						
2012	Championship 1	18	9	0	9	496	462	28	5th	Lost in Elimination Playoffs	R4						
2013	Championship 1	16	10	0	6	538	375	32	3rd	Won in Final	R4						
2014	Championship	26	7	0	19	509	919	25	12th		R4						
2015	Championship 1	22	14	8	0	731	459	28	6th		R4						
2016	League 1	21	16	1	4	709	440	33	2nd	Won in Promotion Final	R5						
2017	Championship	23	7	1	15	457	680	15	9th		R4						
2017	Championship Shield	30	8	1	21	548	963	17	5th		R4						
2018	Championship	23	4	0	19	327	926	8	12th		R5						
2018	Championship Shield	30	6	0	24	465	1093	12	7th		R5						
2019	League 1	1	1	0	0	29	14	2	6th		R5	1895 Cup	R2				
2020	League 1	League abandoned due to the COVID-19 pandemic									R5						
2021	League 1	17	8	1	8	505	488	17	7th		Did not participate						
2022	League 1	20	13	0	7	772	511	26	5th	Lost in Preliminary Final	R4						
2023	League 1	18	6	0	12	425	520	12	7th		R3						
2024	League One	20	13	1	6	687	432	27	3rd	Lost in Semi-final	R4	1895 Cup	GS				
2025	League One	18	9	0	9	529	335	18	6th (Note: Promotion due to the merging League One and the Championship)	Play-offs cancelled	R1	1895 Cup	R1				
2026	Championship	24	8	0	16	403	754	16	15th		R3	1895 Cup	SF				

== Honours ==
- Challenge Cup: 1
  - 1921-22
- Lancashire County Cup: 3
  - 1911-12, 1914–15, 1918–19
- Lancashire League: 1
  - 1918-19
- League 1: 1
  - 2016
  - Play-Off Winners: 1
    - 2013

== Law Cup ==
The Law Cup is an annual match between Oldham Roughyeds and Rochdale Hornets, first contested on 7 May 1921. Including the 2008 fixture, Oldham have won 36 to Rochdale's 22 with 3 drawn games.

== Women's team ==
In 2014 and 2016, a Rochdale Hornets women's team took part in the Women's Challenge Cup, but did not progress past the first round on either occasion. In 2019, Rochdale Hornets relaunched the women's team entering the League 1 Division and playing their home fixtures at Rochdale Mayfield ARLFC. After losing their first three games they recording their first victory with a 28–26 over Whitley Bay Barbarians. In the 2019 Challenge Cup Rochdale were knocked out 56–12 by Barrow in the first round. In 2020, they were due to make their first appearance in the second round of Challenge Cup against Keighley Cougars (having been given a first-round bye). However, the competition was suspended before the match could take place. In 2025, Rochdale Hornets finished top of League 2 and defeated Rochdale Mayfield 20–14 in the final to earn promotion to Northern League 1 (the third tier of women's rugby league).
