= Head coach (rugby league) =

Head coach of a rugby league team

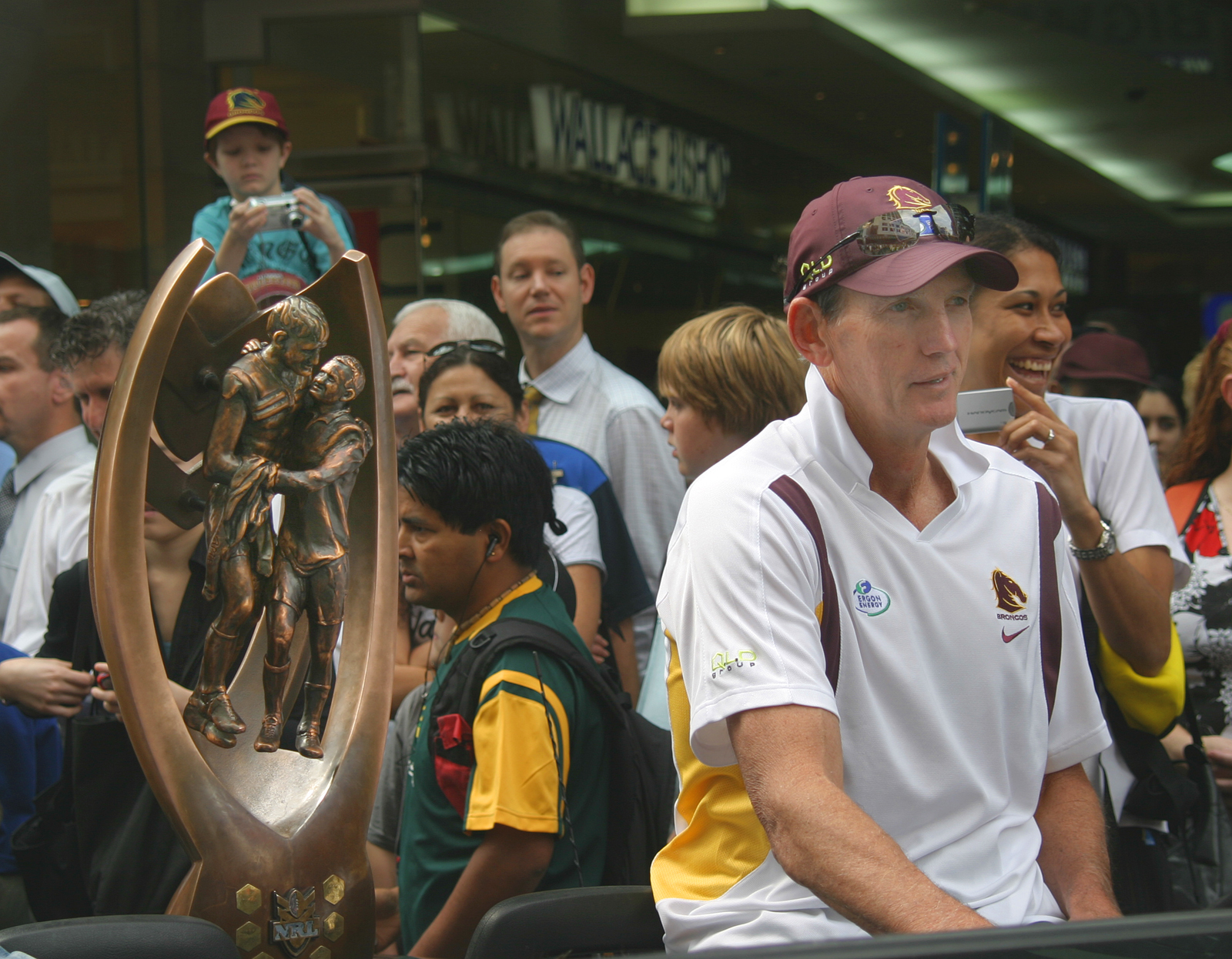
Wayne Bennett at a 2006 NRL Grand Final victory celebration

A professional rugby league head coach is the primary leader responsible for the tactics, selection, training, analysis and on-field performance of a 13-a-side rugby league team. They are tasked with media duties and in a broad sense in developing the players under their charge.

This role has one of the highest public profiles within an organisation and very likely, a higher salary than other coaching positions. The head coach typically nominally reports to a Football Manager or Director of Rugby, although the Head Coach has discretion over on-field matters, with the FM or DoR playing a supporting role to the Head Coach. A head coach may be involved in evaluating potential transfers, recruitment and player contracts, although this is often done by committee or specific off-field departments in the modern game.

The head coach typically takes their seat either in a box, or high up in the stands. They will be joined by part of their coaching staff, and unlike their soccer manager counterparts, the head-coach will not likely be seen at the touchline during the game.

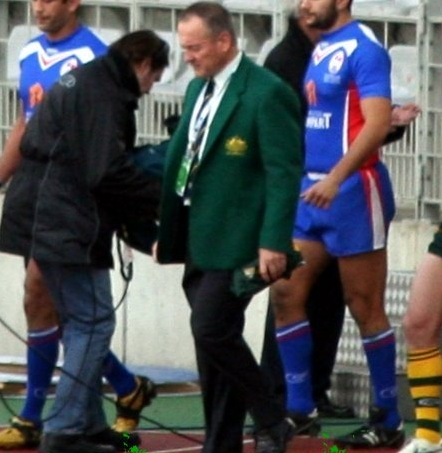
Tim Sheens as coach of the Australian national side in 2009

In the modern era the coaching staff can be quite extensive, with multiple assistant coaches and coaches specifically employed as advisors for certain parts of the game.

Strength and conditioning coaches are a feature of the modern game, and will ensure that the players are in the condition desired by the head coach. The video analysis, data and statistics team will feed into the head coach, making them aware of information via reports and analysis of the opposition. The Sports Science and medical department will likely nominally fall under the responsibility of an off-field department, but report information back to the head coach.

Teams with smaller hierarchies and tighter budgets have fewer off-field roles. Lower down the tiers of professional rugby league roles are combined with individuals taking on greater responsibilities. Prior to the 21st century smaller staff numbers were commonplace, with the head coach sometimes being the only off-field sporting position employed by a club or nation at international level. Prior to the professional era the role of a player-head coach was not uncommon. This has since largely been fazed out, apart from the role of Captain-coach in lower level rugby league.

The Head coach role is the highest role within a rugby league coaching hierarchy, with coaches progressing through the grades, leagues or age-groups in order to gain a position as the head coach of an elite-level organisation. Prior to becoming a Head coach, they may well also serve as assistant coach at a top-level club. Former professional rugby league players make up the overwhelming majority of professional rugby league head coaches, but there are many head coaches who have gained their coaching licence without playing at the elite level. Additionally there are players who had their playing careers cut short by injury, or just limited first-grade games such as Michael Maguire who would later on win competitions with the Wigan Warriors, South Sydney Rabbitohs, Brisbane Broncos, New South Wales and the Kiwis.

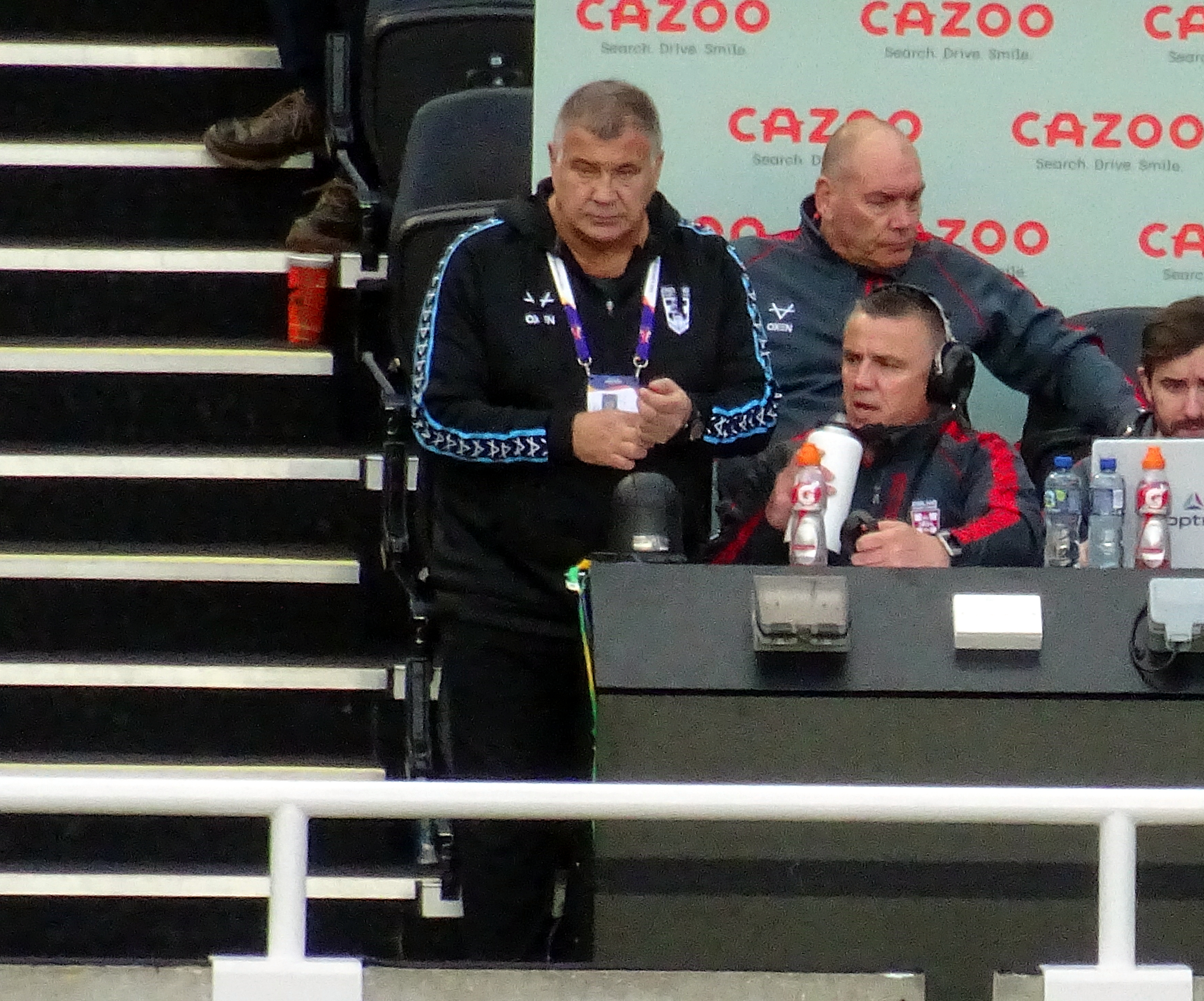
Shaun Wane in the coaching area high up in the stands in 2022

Representative sides and International sides may not follow the same progression through the ranks that tends to happen with club sides, with appointments made on criteria that links to shorter periods with players, rather than a whole season.

Metrics for the greatest head coaches are difficult to quantify, with differences with various eras, between the club game in the Northern and Southern Hemisphere, head coaches who have coached at international level and at Representative level. Win percentages and number of games and trophies are useful indicators in this regard.

== Southern Hemisphere ==
Wayne Bennett is the longest serving and most successful coach in the history of the game, with success at club, representative and international level.

Jack Gibson earned the nickname “Supercoach” for coaching winning sides at Eastern Suburbs and the Parramatta Eels as well as being a transformative figure in the modern game, changing the way the role of head coach was viewed by the outside world.

Tim Sheens coached nearly 800 games, winning four premierships and success with the Kangaroos at international level.

Warren Ryan is considered one of the most influential rugby league coaches of the 20th century.

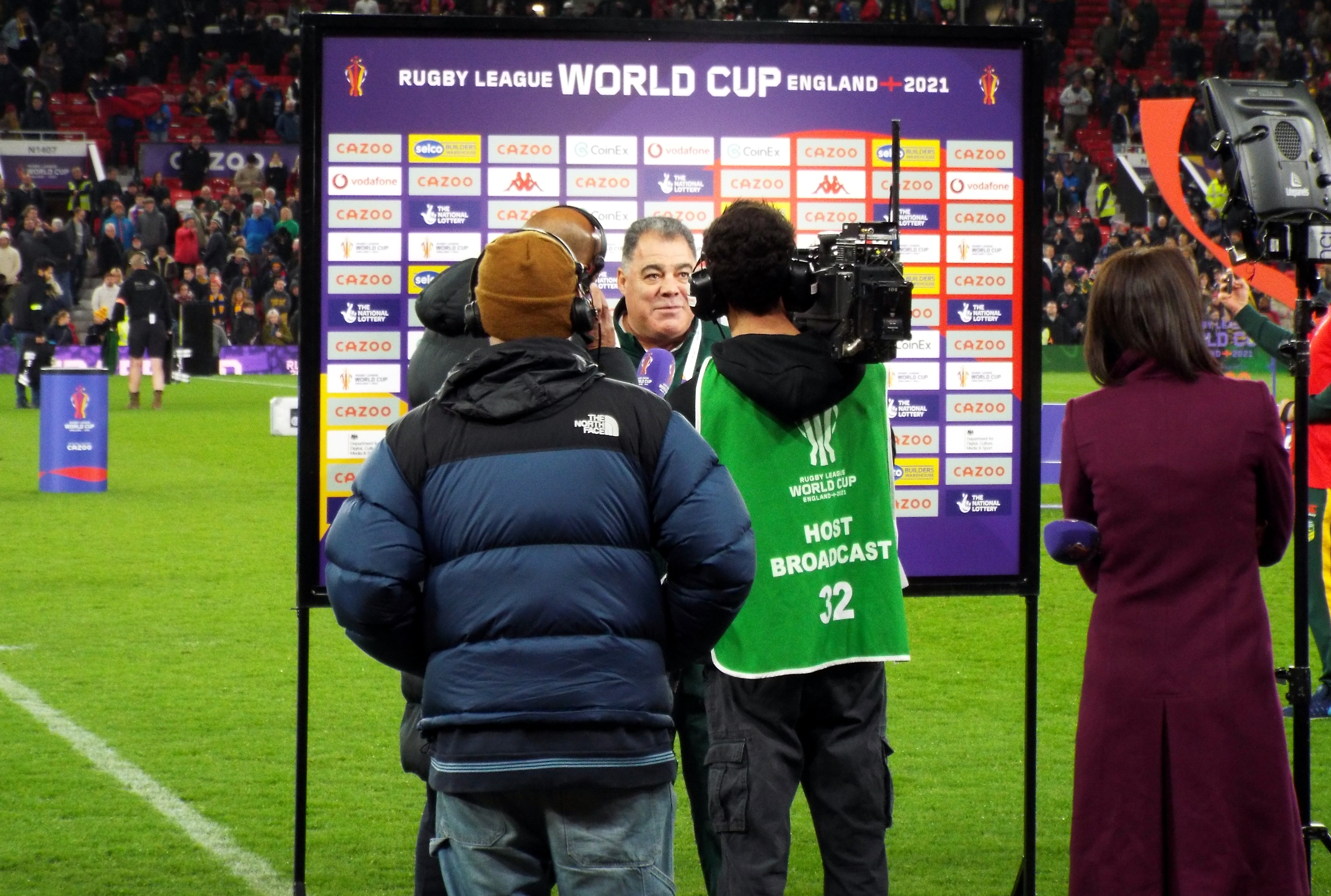
Mal Meninga interviewed post 2021 RLWC Final

Arthur Halloway was the most successful coach in the first half of the twentieth-century, winning eight premierships.

Ivan Cleary is credited as one of the greats currently coaching in the NRL, after leading the Penrith Panthers to four straight premierships in the 2021, 2022, 2023 and 2024 NRL Grand Finals, becoming the first coach to do so in the NRL era.

Mal Meninga has recently returned to coaching in the NRL, but really excelled as a head coach in the representative arena for Queensland and at international level for the Kangaroos, highlighting the differences between the club game and State of Origin and internationals for a head coach.

== Northern Hemisphere ==
John Monie, Tony Smith, Alex Murphy, Brian Noble, John Kear, Mal Reilly and Daniel Anderson are a handful of coaches who have achieved great success as a head coach in England.
