= Batley Bulldogs =

English professional rugby league club, based in West Yorkshire

Club information
- Full name: Batley Bulldogs Rugby League Football Club
- Nickname(s): The Bulldogs; The Gallant Youths
- Colours: Cerise, Gold and White
- Founded: 1880; 146 years ago
- Website: batleybulldogs.co.uk

Current details
- Ground: Mount Pleasant (7,500)
- CEO: Paul Harrison
- Chairman: Kevin Nicholas
- Coach: James Ford
- Captain: Dane Manning
- Competition: Championship
- 2026 season: 10th (Eliminators)
- Current season

Uniforms
Home colours	Away colours

Records
- Championships: 1 (1924)
- Challenge Cups: 3 (1897, 1898, 1901)
- Other top-tier honours: 3

The Batley Bulldogs are an English professional rugby league club in Batley, West Yorkshire, who play in the Championship. Batley were one of the original twenty-two rugby football clubs that formed the Northern Rugby Football Union in 1895. They were League Champions in 1924 and have won three Challenge Cups.

== History ==
=== Early years ===
Batley Cricket Club decided to have a rugby football side merge with them at their ground under the name Batley Cricket Athletic and Football Club. The two local rugby teams, Batley Mountaineers and Batley Athletic, played a challenge match at the cricket club's Mount Pleasant home on 23 October 1880 to determine which was the town's premier rugby side and worthy of the cricket club. Both sides claimed victory but the cricket club chose Batley Athletic to join them.

The new club's first game was at home against Bradford Zingari which they won by 2 goals, 3 touchdowns, 2 dead balls and one touch goal to nil. Jacob Parker scored the first touchdown. The first season finished with Batley having won 15 games and drawn 5 out of 26 matches played.

They won the Yorkshire Challenge Cup in 1884/85 season beating Heckmondwike, Pudsey, Halifax, Salterhebble and Bradford before beating Manningham 8 minor points to 2 in the final held at Cardigan Fields in Leeds.

After the 1890–91 season, Batley along with other Yorkshire Senior clubs Bradford, Brighouse, Dewsbury, Halifax, Huddersfield, Hull, Hunslet, Leeds, Liversedge, Manningham and Wakefield decided that they wanted their own county league starting in 1891 along the lines of a similar competition that had been played in Lancashire. The clubs wanted full control of the league but the Yorkshire Rugby Football Union would not sanction the competition as it meant giving up control of rugby football to the senior clubs.

Batley were one of the original twenty-two clubs that met at the George Hotel, Huddersfield on 29 August 1895 and formed the Northern Rugby Football Union. Batley's first match under the new union was on 7 September 1895 against Hull F.C. at Mount Pleasant with Batley winning 7–3.

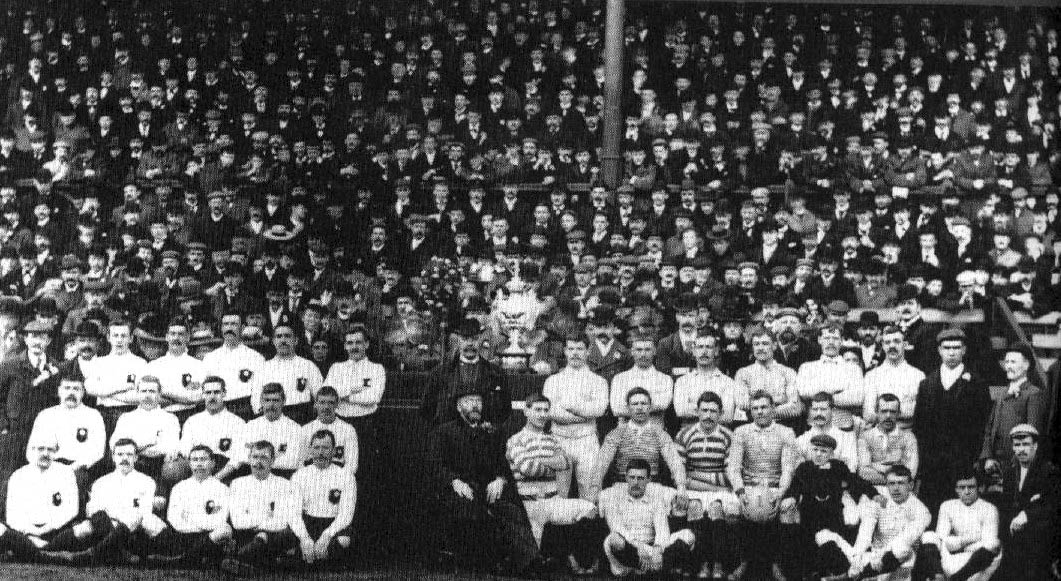
St Helens vs Batley (left) in the first 1897 Challenge Cup Final

Sixth in the Yorkshire Senior Competition of 1896/97, they battled their way to third spot come the end of the next season. Where knock-out competitions was concerned, they were peerless. In 1897, the 'Gallant Youths' became the first winners of the Challenge Cup beating St. Helens 10–3, in front of a crowd of 13,492 at Headingley. Batley retained the trophy by beating Bradford Northern on the corresponding weekend the following year at Headingley in front of 27,941 spectators, which was then a record gate for a rugby match.

The club were Yorkshire League winners in 1898/99 and in 1900/01 won the Challenge Cup for the third and last time to date; once again Headingley was the venue as Batley defeated Warrington 6–0.

Wharton 'Wattie' Davies set club records for most appearance, goals and points between 1896 and 1912. Batley's next cup triumph came on 23 November 1912 when Hull were defeated 17–3 at Headingley in Batley's one and only Yorkshire County Cup win.

Became a Limited Company Batley Cricket Athletic and Football Club Ltd in 1922

The 'Gallant Youths' reached the semi-final of the Yorkshire Cup and led the league in November 1923. Batley were crowned champions on Saturday 3 May 1924, lifting the Rugby League Championship Trophy for the only time in the club's history, after defeating Wigan 13–7 in the final. The club were also Yorkshire League winners that season.

The record attendance was set at 23,989 for the visit of Leeds for a third round Challenge Cup match on 14 March 1925.

=== Post Second World War ===
Cerise and fawn colours worn by Batley during the 1980s

1952 saw a Yorkshire Cup final appearance against Huddersfield on 15 November. 'Fartown' running out 18–8 winners. The club's name was changed from Batley Cricket, Athletic & Football Club Ltd to its present official name of Batley Football Club Ltd in 1979.

The club celebrated its centenary in 1981 with a win over the league's new London team, Fulham.

In the 1960s the league was restructured into two divisions for two seasons before the single-division format was finally ditched in 1973 (there was also a three-season experiment with two divisions at the beginning of the 20th century). Batley are one of only a few teams never to make it into the top flight, although they came very close in 1993/94. The last match of the season against Doncaster came down to being a play-off for a spot in the first division, but Batley lost 10–5 in front of a capacity crowd of 4,500 at Mount Pleasant, and the chance was lost.

The local council suggested that Dewsbury and Batley ground share at Crown Flatt after refusing a grant towards safety repairs to Mount Pleasant in February 1987.

Batley looked set to join the elite in 1995 when they held off Huddersfield to finish in second place, just two points behind champions Keighley. The club succeeded in winning the Second Division Championship in the 1994–95 season. However, when the Super League was created for the following year, Batley along with Keighley were excluded. The club estimated that the decision cost them around £500,000.

=== Summer rugby era ===
Old bulldog emblem

Batley added 'Bulldogs' to their name for the 1996 season. The newly named Batley Bulldogs finished 1996 at the foot of Division One. Batley won the Trans-Pennine Trophy in 1998 beating Oldham in the final held at Mount Pleasant. Batley were also promoted from the Second Division that same season.

In 2003, Barry Eaton broke the world record for consecutive goal kicks.

The club underwent a major shake up in the coaching staff with the resignation of head coach David Ward due to pressure from some supporters in the form of derisory comments in the local press. The new coaching first team set up involved Gary Thornton as Head Coach, and assistant Paul Harrison.

After a tough season in 2005 Batley were into National League One relegation play-offs, facing bitter rivals and neighbours Dewsbury. Victory in the final saw Batley stay up against increasingly well funded sides with Super League ambitions.

2006 saw Batley start the campaign with little promise after a series of dismal performances in the Northern Rail Cup and the early rounds of National League One. However, coach Gary Thornton turned the side round and Batley made their way into the end of season play-offs. Jay Duffy's late drop goal sealed a 23–22 victory at Leigh to end the Lancastrians' own hopes of promotion and ultimately earn Thornton the honour of National League coach of the year. Batley failed to replicate this success in the next round, crashing to a 30–0 defeat at Whitehaven to put an abrupt end to their season.

After the previous season's mid-table finish 2009 started as a bad season for Batley. Gary Thornton resigned after a 60–22 loss on Easter Monday against Toulouse Olympique He was replaced by Karl Harrison. Batley stayed up after a 30–24 over Featherstone Rovers in which Batley were 14–0 down at one stage, they also beat Leigh, Widnes, Barrow, Whitehaven and Halifax.

2010 started for Batley with 5 wins and 1 draw in the Northern Rail Cup, including a record-breaking 100–4 win over Gateshead Thunder. Batley had a good run of wins in the Challenge Cup however they were defeated 74–12 by Catalans Dragons in the Quarter Final. Batley's Co-operative Championship season commenced well with wins over Keighley 22–12, Dewsbury 22–8, Whitehaven 54–6 and Widnes 35–16 to see the club finish in 7th position. Having finished top of their Northern Rail group section, the club entered the knock-out stages. A strong performance away at Leigh in the semi-final, where Batley were clear underdogs, put them into the final on 18 July 2010, where they beat Widnes with two late tries scored by Alex Brown. It was Batley's first silverware since 1998.

2011 saw Batley finish 3rd in the championship, later to be knocked out of the play-offs by Halifax, whom the Batley coach, Karl Harrison headed to take over for the 2012 season. Batley also took the Huddersfield Giants close in their Challenge Cup quarter-final clash at Mount Pleasant. Batley had the lead throughout the game until Dane Manning was shown a red card at around 65 minutes for what many fans of both sides thought unfair. Huddersfield took the one man advantage and managed to outscore the Bulldogs in the last 15 minutes of the game.

2012 saw the arrival of John Kear taking over as head coach of Batley. Batley started 2012 winning the Northern Rail group which saw wins over Championship rivals Featherstone Rovers and Keighley. They also started the Championship season off strong with wins over Leigh, Dewsbury, York City Knights, Keighley and Halifax and a double over Hunslet but defeats came to Featherstone Rovers, Sheffield, Keighley at home, and Swinton Lions.

In April 2016 it was announced Matt Diskin was to take over at Batley Bulldogs from 2017 after John Kear announced he would be joining Wakefield Trinity as director of rugby in 2017.

Batley finished the 2021 Championship season in 4th place on the table and qualified for the playoffs. The club would fall one match short of the Million Pound Game after losing 51–12 against Toulouse Olympique. In the 2022 Championship season, Batley reached the Million Pound Game for the first time but were defeated 44–12 by Leigh. In the 2023 RFL Championship season, Batley finished 7th on the table, missing out on the playoffs by for and against. The following season, Batley finished 10th on the table.

== Ground ==
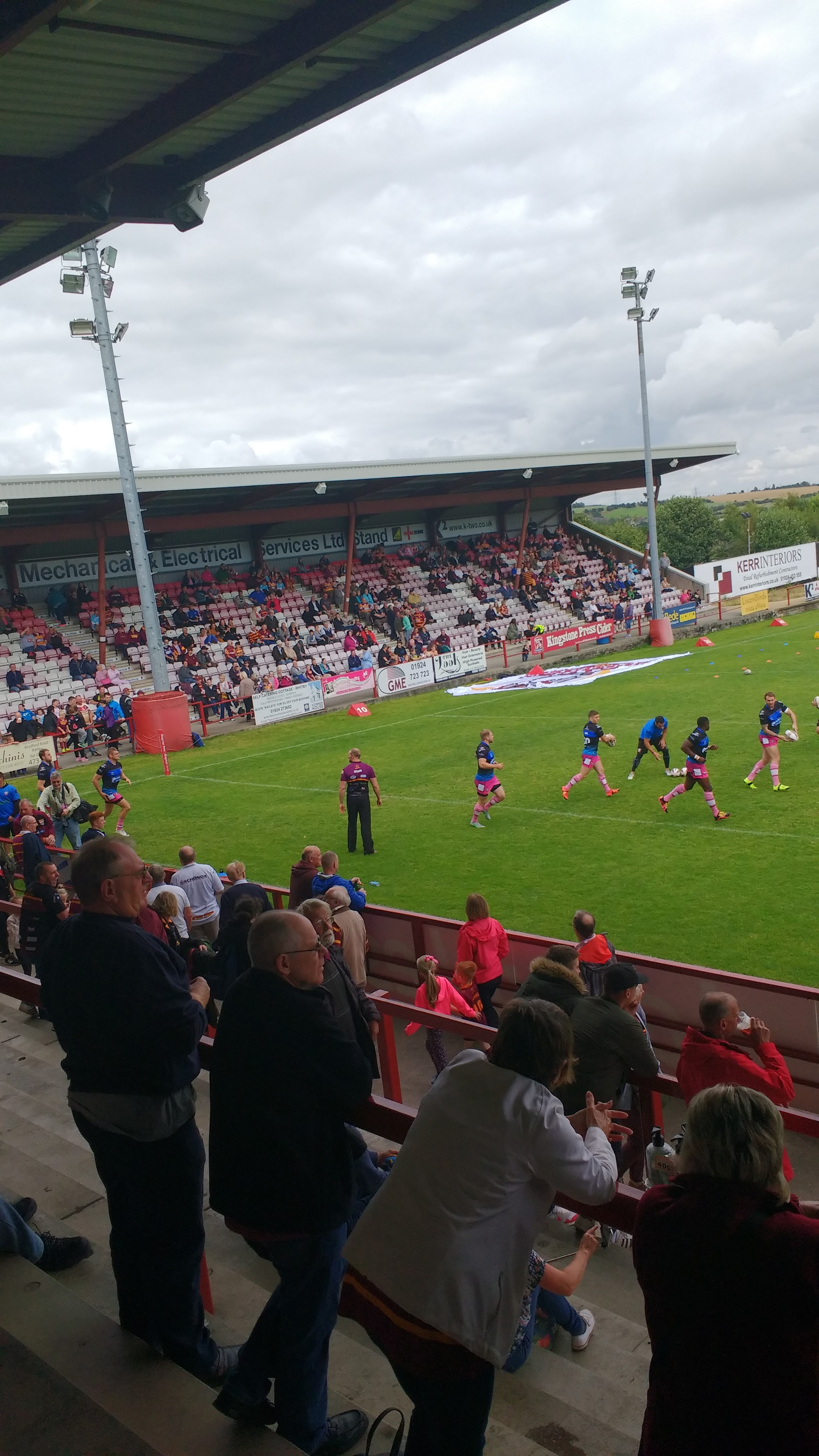
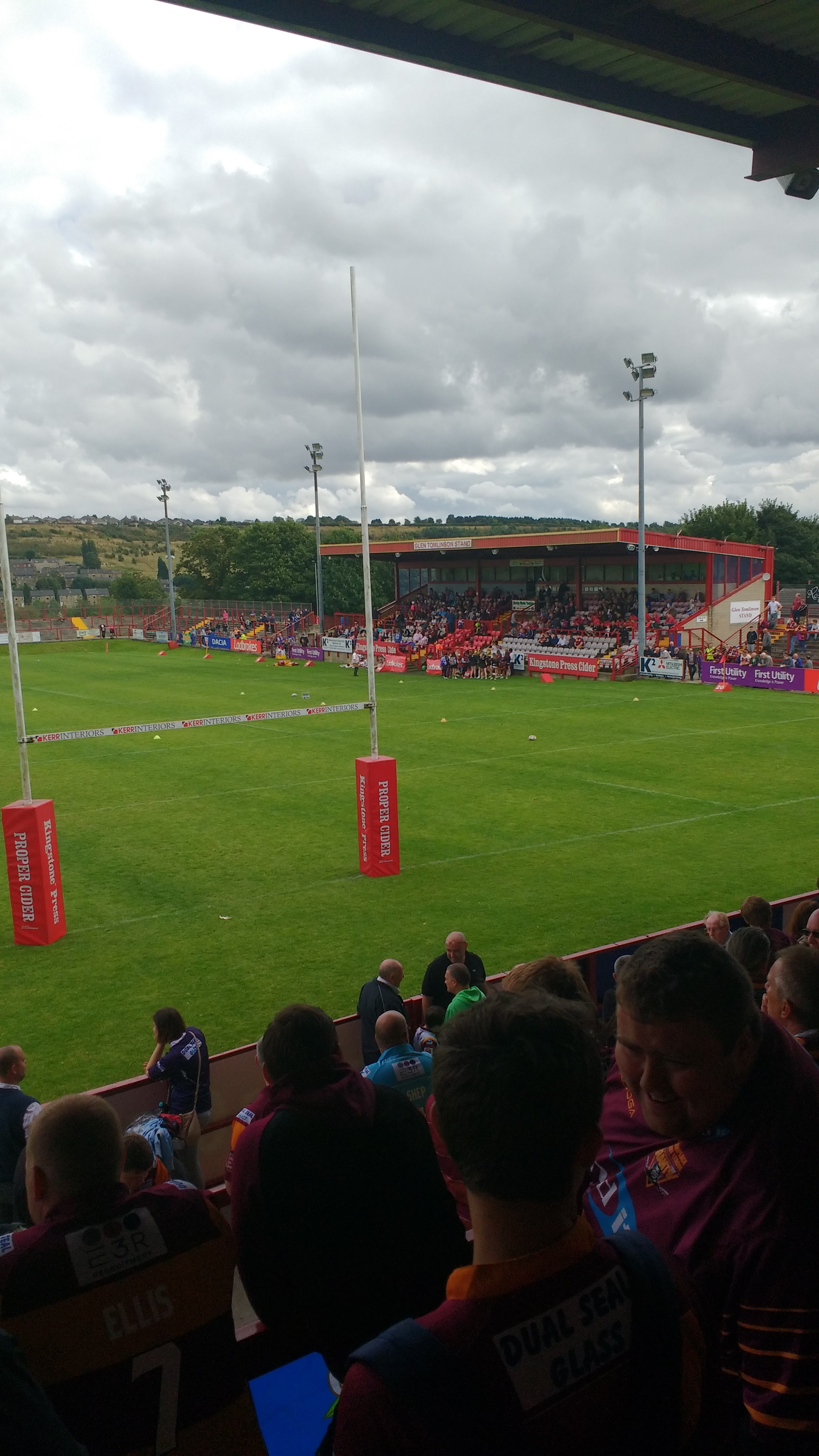
Two views of Mount Pleasant: (left) small seated stand, (right) main stand side

The club play at Mount Pleasant which currently has a capacity of 7,500. It has a seated main stand, a large covered terrace behind one goal where the changing facilities are located, a small covered seated stand running approximately halfway down one touchline, with open terracing behind the other goal and to the side of the main stand.

== Boards ==
Batley Cricket, Athletic & Football Club Presidents 1880 – 1922

John W. Blackburn – 1880/April 1890, Dr William Bayldon – April 1890/April 1893, David Fox Burnley – April 1893/April 1899, James Goodall – April 1899/May 1903, William G. Isherwood – May 1903/June 1905, Harry Brook – June 1905/May 1906, Dan Brearley – May 1906/May 1907, J. Harry Spencer – May 1907/May 1909, Harry E. Whitaker – May 1909/May 1911, William H. Shaw – May 1911/May 1913, Samuel Brearley – May 1913/May 1918, John Frederick Whitaker – May 1918/May 1922

Batley Cricket, Athletic & Football Club Ltd Chairmen 1922 – 1979

John Frederick Whitaker – June 1922/May 1925, Ernest Kirk – May 1925/May 1926, Dr William W. Walker – May 1926/June 1927, John Frederick Whitaker – June 1927/May 1929, Arthur Summers – May 1929/July 1929, Dr Frank W. Smorfitt -August 1929/July 1930, Ernest Kirk – July 1930/May 1938, Rubert Asquith – July 1938/May 1940

No Official Chairman from May 1940/January 1942

John 'Jackie' S. Barritt – January 1942/October 1954, William W. Battye – October 1954/May 1955, John 'Jackie' S. Barritt – June 1955/April 1958, Ewart Earnshaw – April 1958/November 1967 & President – November 1967/June 1979, Leslie Driver – November 1967/June 1979

Batley Football Club Ltd Chairmen 1979 –

Peter S. Wilson – June 1979/February 1981, Michael J. Lumb – February 1981/March 1989, Stephen A. Ball – March 1989/May 1995 & President May 1995/January 1996, Ron Earnshaw – May 1995/June 1996 & President September 2007/October 2013, Trevor Hobson – June 1996/November 1997, Kevin M. Nicholas – November 1997/

== 2027 squad ==
2027 Batley Bulldogs Squad
First team squad			Coaching staff
(Nigeria) Leo Aliyu – PR; (England) Mitch Beedle – SH, SO; (England) Cam Berry – HK; (England) Jack Briggs – PR; (England) Robbie Butterworth – FB, SO; (England) Ronan Dixon – PR; (England) Felix Ellis – CE, WG, FB; (England) Nyle Flynn – LF, SR; (England) Elliott Fox – HK	(England) Lewis Hagan – SR, CE; (England) Evan Hodgson – LF, SR; (England) Liam Kirk – PR; (England) Dane Manning (c) – SR; (England) Derrell Olpherts – WG, CE, FB; (England) Jonah Parsons – HK; (England) Ben Reynolds – SO, SH	(England) Nick Staveley – SR; (England) Dom Sinfield – CE; (England) Robson Stevens – PR, LF; (England) Marcus Walker – WG, CE; (England) Joel Walsh – WG, CE, FB; (England) Josh Woods – SH, SO	Head coach: (England) James Ford; Assistant coach: (England) Paul Couch; Legend: (c) Captain(s); (vc) Vice-captain(s); Updated: Source(s): https://batleybulldogs.co.uk/players/

== 2027 transfers ==
=== Gains ===
Player	From	Contract	Date
(England) Nick Staveley	Goole Vikings	1 year	19 September 2026
(England) Elliott Fox	Leeds Rhinos	1 year	23 September 2026
(England) Jack Briggs	Dewsbury Rams	1 year	23 September 2026
(England) Marcus Walker	Wynnum Manly Seagulls	1 year	4 October 2026
(Nigeria) Leo Aliyu	Keighley Cougars	1 year	13 October 2026
(England) Lewis Hagan	Bradford Bulls	1 year	18 October 2026
(England) Joel Walsh	Bradford Bulls	1 year	5 November 2026
(England) Cam Berry	Hunslet RLFC	1 year	27 October 2026
(England) Dom Sinfield	Wakefield Trinity	1 year	2 November 2026

=== Losses ===
Player	To	Contract	Date
(England) Paul Foulstone	Dewsbury Celtic		24 August 2026
(Germany) Ben White	Rochdale Hornets	1 year	21 September 2026
(England) Luca Atkinson			23 September 2026
(England) Joe Burton	Goole Vikings	1 year	8 October 2026
(England) Ollie Greensmith	Keighley Cougars	1 year	8 October 2026

=== Retired ===
Player	Date
(England) Alistair Leak	17 September 2026
(England) Lucas Walshaw	17 September 2026

== Players ==
=== Players earning international caps while at Batley ===
- Harry Bedford won caps for England (RU) while at Batley in 1889 against New Zealand Natives, and in 1890 against Scotland, and Ireland
- Joseph "Joe" Berry won caps for Scotland while at Huddersfield Giants, Doncaster, Rochdale Hornets, and Batley Bulldogs 1998...2003 4-caps + 3-caps (sub)
- George Brown won a cap for England while at Batley in 1945 against Wales
- George Davidge won a cap for England while at Batley in 1924 against Other Nationalities
- William "Will" T. Davies won caps for Wales (RL) while at Batley and Halifax 1909...1912 4-caps, and won a cap for Great Britain (RL) while at Halifax in 1911 against Australia
- Norman Field won a cap for Great Britain while at Batley in 1963 against Australia
- Isaac "Ike" John Fowler won a cap for Wales whilst at Batley, and won a cap for Other Nationalities whilst at Batley
- Carl Gibson won a cap playing for Great Britain against France in 1985 in his final season at the club.
- Nathan Graham won caps for Scotland while at Bradford, Dewsbury, Featherstone Rovers and Batley 1998...2004 7-caps + 3-caps (sub)
- Frederick Hill won a cap for England while at Batley in 1909 against Wales
- Bill Hudson won caps for England while at Batley in 1946 against Wales and France, in 1947 against France, while at Wigan in 1949 against France, and won caps for Great Britain while at Wigan in 1949 against Australia
- Frederick Lowrie won caps for England (RU) while at Batley in 1889 against New Zealand Natives, and in 1890 against Wales
- David Luckwell won caps for Wales while at Hull Kingston Rovers, and Batley 1999...2000 3-caps (sub)
- Iain Marsh won caps for Scotland while at Oldham, Batley and Rochdale Hornets 2004...2007 5-caps + 3-caps (sub)
- Martin McLoughlin won caps for Ireland while at Wigan, Oldham and Batley and 2001...2008
- Joseph "Joe" Oliver, won caps for England while at Batley in 1928 against Wales, while at Hull in 1933 against Australia, in 1936 against Wales and France, and won caps for Great Britain while at Batley in against 1928 Australia (3 matches), and New Zealand
- George Palmer won a cap for England while at Batley in 1951 against Other Nationalities
- Lee Paterson won caps for Scotland while at Batley and Widnes 2007...present 3-caps
- Harry Rees
- Brinley Williams won caps for Wales while at Batley in 1921 against England and Australia, and won a cap for Other Nationalities while at Batley in 1921 against England
- Frederick Willis won a cap for Wales while at Batley in 1921

=== Other notable players ===
- Wilf Auty
- Keegan Hirst
- F. T. Adams captain circa-1936
- (South Africa) Andrew Ballot (No. 13) circa-1990s
- Mark Barlow
- Trevor Barlow
- John Bell circa-1973
- Tommy "Dowdy" Brannan
- Tommy "Chick" Brannan
- Jack Briggs 1954–63
- David Brooke circa-1973
- Alex Brown
- Donald "Don" Burnell Yorkshire XIII 1947–48
- Graham Chalkley circa-1973
- Richard Colley
- Kevin Crouthers
- Wharton "Wattie" Davies 1896...1912
- Robin Dewhurst circa-1973
- Phil Doyle Yorkshire XIII 1969–70
- George Douglas, for Scotland (RU) while at Jed-Forest RFC (RU) 1921 1-cap (signed for Batley 1921–22)
- Eric Earnshaw
- Barry Eaton
- Danny Maun
- John Etty, for British Empire XIII while at Batley 1951 Wales XIII
- Jim Etty
- Bolu Fagborun
- Craig Farrell
- Dai Fitzgerald
- John Fox (Testimonial match 1979)
- Peter Fox
- Fred "Ted" Fozzard
- John Gallagher
- Jim Gath
- Ian Gelderd Stand-off
- Carl Gibson
- Harry Goodall
- John B "Jack" Goodall
- Jeff Grayshon
- Jonathan "Jon" Grayshon
- Ben Gronow
- Tommy Haslam 1888 British Isles tourist (RU)
- Samuel "Sam" Hargreaves Yorkshire XIII 1946–47
- Tom Hemingway
- Ernest "Ernie" Hepworth (Testimonial match 1978)
- David Heron
- Paul Hicks
- Philip "Phil" Holmes circa-1973
- John Jones circa-1980
- Arthur Keegan
- Robert Kelly
- Kevin King
- Dean Lawford
- Stephen "Steve" Lingard circa-1973
- Davide Longo
- George H. Main
- Francis Maloney
- Tommy Martyn
- Colin Maskill circa-1973
- Edward Melling circa-1920
- Luke Menzies
- James "Jim" Naylor Yorkshire XIII 1972–73
- Gareth Moore
- George Northern born circa-1927 Scrum-half and captain for Batley in 1954 and Doncaster from 1955 to 1963
- Joe Oakland
- Trevor Oldroyd circa-1973
- Lee Paterson
- Jackie Perry
- Roy Powell
- Richard Price circa-1998
- Sean Richardson
- William "Bill" Riches (Testimonial match 1952) Yorkshire 1946...52 (England v France 1946–47, "reserve to travel")
- Gus Risman
- Joe Robinson circa-1920
- Shad Royston
- Mark Scott (Testimonial match 1994)
- David "Dave" Secker circa-1973
- Malcolm Shuttleworth
- Herbert 'Dodger' Simms
- Roger Simpson
- Byron Smith
- Gilbert "Gil" Smith born circa-1925
- Andrew "Andy" Speak
- Timothy "Tim" Spears
- John Stainburn (Testimonial match 1993)
- George Standidge circa-1973
- Doug Stokes circa-1950s
- Paul Storey (Testimonial match 1988)
- Gary Thornton
- Glen Tomlinson
- Trevor 'Tank' Walker Left-Prop
- Jim Waltham
- Alan Watts circa-1973
- John Westbury (#13) circa-1950s
- Clifford "Cliff" Williams circa-1973
- Martin Whelan 1970s–1980s

== Past first team coaches ==
List of first team coaches for the Batley Bulldogs
Coach	Years
Richard Webster (aka London Dick)	c. 1881–92
Joseph "Joe" Birch	c. 1893
Fred Bennett	c. 1895–97
Joseph "Joe" Wilson	c. 1898–1901
Jack W. Sutcliffe	c. 1905
Ernest Gill	c. 1908
Arthur Garner	c. 1912
Jack W. Sutcliffe	c. 1913 – c. 1922
Albert Armitage	August 1923–?
Charlie Hollidge	July 1927 – July 1928
George Forber	August 1928–?
Jack Sheard	April 1929 – May 1929
W.H. Evans	June 1929 – April 1930
Albert Armitage	July 1930 – May 1931
Joe Lyman	July 1931 – November 1934
Charlie Glossop	November 1934 – February 1935
William R. 'Bill' Smith	February 1935 – July 1935
Charlie Pollard	July 1935 – March 1939
Jim Lyman	July 1939–?
William R. 'Bill' Smith	August 1945 – July 1947
Mick Exley	July 1947 – January 1948
Jim Brough	January 1948 – July 1948
William R. 'Bill' Smith	July 1948 – November 1949
Harry Royal	November 1949 – November 1950
Charles 'Charlie' Eaton	December 1950 – May 1952
Alex Fiddes	July 1952 – March 1954
Charles 'Charlie' Eaton	March 1954 – January 1955
Robert 'Bob' Robson	January 1955 – April 1955
Michael Condon	April 1955 – September 1955
Robert 'Bob' Robson	September 1955 – January 1956
Gordon Harrison	February 1956 – October 1956
Eric Batten	October 1956 – April 1958
Frank 'Shanks' Watson	June 1958 – June 1962
Robert 'Bob' Kelly	July 1962 – October 1962
Arthur Staniland	October 1962 – June 1966
Dave Valentine	June 1966 – December 1967
David 'Dave' Cox	December 1967 – April 1970
Mick Sullivan	June 1970 – October 1970
John Westbury	November 1970 – September 1971
David 'Dave' Cox	September 1971 – November 1972
Don Fox	November 1972 – October 1974
Alan Hepworth	November 1974 – April 1975
David 'Dave' Cox	May 1975 – June 1975
Trevor Walker	June 1975 – June 1977
Albert Fearnley	June 1977 – October 1977
David Stockwell	October 1977 – June 1979
Tommy Smales	June 1979 – October 1981
Trevor Lowe	October 1981 – May 1982
Terry Crook	June 1982 – November 1984
George Pieniazek	November 1984 – November 1985
Brian Lockwood	November 1985 – May 1987
Paul Daley	July 1987 – May 1990
Keith Rayne	May 1990 – April 1991
David Ward	May 1991 – October 1994
Jeff Grayshon MBE	October 1994 – July 1996
Mike Kuiti	July 1996 – September 1996
Peter Regan	November 1996 – September 1997
David Ward	September 1997 – June 2000
Jon Sharp	June 2000 – January 2001
David Ward	January 2001 – March 2001
Paul Storey	March 2001 – October 2003
Gary Thornton	October 2003 – April 2009
Karl Harrison	April 2009 – September 2011
John Kear	September 2011 – September 2016
Matt Diskin	October 2016 – September 2019
Craig Lingard	September 2019 – September 2023
Mark Moxon	September 2023 – June 2025
John Kear (caretaker)	June 2025 – September 2025

== Seasons ==
=== Super League era ===
Season	League									Play-offs	Challenge Cup	Other competitions		Name	Tries	Name	Points
Season	Division	P	W	D	L	F	A	Pts	Pos	Play-offs	Challenge Cup	Other competitions		Top try scorer		Top point scorer	
1996	Division One	20	2	2	16	230	668	6	11th		R4						
1997	Division Two	20	14	0	6	600	435	28	4th		R4						
1998	Division Two	20	13	0	7	437	354	26	3rd		R4	Trans-Pennine Cup	W				
1999	Northern Ford Premiership	28	9	3	16	546	553	21	12th		R4						
2000	Northern Ford Premiership	28	6	0	22	482	759	12	16th		R3						
2001	Northern Ford Premiership	28	13	0	15	452	618	26	13th		R4						
2002	Northern Ford Premiership	27	16	1	10	658	666	33	7th	Lost in Final	R4						
2003	National League One	18	5	1	12	366	543	11	9th		R5						
2004	National League One	18	8	0	10	503	534	16	7th		R5						
2005	National League One	18	5	0	13	417	574	10	8th		R4						
2006	National League One	18	8	0	10	393	467	16	7th	Lost in Preliminary Final	R4						
2007	National League One	18	5	1	12	372	645	19	8th		R4						
2008	National League One	18	5	0	13	387	538	23	9th		R4						
2009	Championship	20	8	2	10	536	620	32	8th		R5						
2010	Championship	20	7	0	13	479	488	29	7th		QF	Championship Cup	W				
2011	Championship	20	12	0	8	498	406	41	3rd	Lost in Elimination Playoffs	R4						
2012	Championship	18	11	0	7	551	326	40	5th	Lost in Elimination Playoffs	R5						
2013	Championship	26	16	1	9	670	394	57	5th	Lost in Semi Final	R4						
2014	Championship	26	12	1	13	582	573	45	8th		R4						
2015	Championship	23	7	0	16	421	539	14	9th		R6						
2015	Championship Shield	30	10	0	20	645	707	20	5th		R6						
2016	Championship	23	15	1	7	589	485	31	3rd		R6						
2016	The Qualifiers	7	1	0	6	97	276	2	7th		R6						
2017	Championship	23	11	0	12	549	663	22	6th	Lost in Shield Semi Final	R5						
2017	Championship Shield	30	16	1	13	797	801	33	2nd	Lost in Shield Semi Final	R5						
2018	Championship	23	8	0	15	523	703	16	7th		R4						
2018	Championship Shield	30	14	0	16	753	805	28	3rd		R4						
2019	Championship	27	8	1	18	462	756	17	10th		R5	1895 Cup	SF				
2020	Championship (Note: The 2020 Championship was abandoned due to the COVID-19 pandemic in the United Kingdom. Statistics shown are those at time of abandonment and are not official.)	5	1	0	4	82	133	3	9th		R4						
2021	Championship	21	13	0	8	561	411	26	4th	Lost in Semi Final	R4 (Note: Officially round 2 due to the competitions temporary restructure in 2021.)	1895 Cup	R2				
2022	Championship	27	17	2	8	738	551	36	5th	Lost in Grand Final	R5						
2023	Championship	27	15	0	12	506	519	30	7th		R6						
2024	Championship	26	11	0	15	422	591	22	10th		R6	1895 Cup	QF				
2025	Championship	24	4	2	18	386	751	10	12th		R4	1895 Cup	R1				
2026	Championship	24	11	0	13	657	573	22	10th	Lost in Elimination Semi-finals	R3	1895 Cup	R1				

== Honours ==
=== Major titles ===
Major title competitions
Competition	Wins	Years won
RFL Championship / Super League	1	1923–24
Challenge Cup	3	1896–97, 1897–98, 1900–01

=== Other titles ===
Other title competitions
Competition	Wins	Years won
RFL Yorkshire League	2	1898–99, 1923–24
RFL Yorkshire Cup	1	1912–13
RFU Yorkshire Cup	1	1885
Championship Cup	1	2010
Trans-Pennine Cup	1	1998

== See also ==
- Heavy Woollen Derby: rivalry with Dewsbury Rams
