= 1996 RFL Division One =

British rugby league championship

RFL Division One
- League: Rugby Football League Division One
- Duration: 20 Rounds
- Teams: 11

1996 Season
- Divisional Premiership winners: Salford Reds
- Champions: Salford Reds
- Tom Bergin Trophy: Cliff Eccles

The 1996 Division One Championship season was the second tier of British rugby league during the 1996 season, and was also the first season of rugby league to be played in the summer. The competition featured all eleven teams from the 1995–96 Rugby Football League season.

== Championship ==
The league was won by Salford Reds for a second successive season, winning promotion to the Super League. The club also won the Divisional Premiership final against Keighley Cougars, with Cliff Eccles winning the Tom Bergin Trophy.

Rochdale Hornets and Batley Bulldogs were both relegated to Division Two.

=== League table ===
	Team	Pld	W	D	L	PF	PA	Pts
1	Salford Reds	20	18	0	2	733	298	36
2	Keighley Cougars	20	14	2	4	558	333	30
3	Hull Sharks	20	14	0	6	565	392	28
4	Featherstone Rovers	20	12	2	6	557	371	26
5	Huddersfield	20	12	0	8	557	308	24
6	Wakefield Trinity	20	10	1	9	485	455	21
7	Widnes	20	9	1	10	413	447	19
8	Dewsbury	20	6	1	13	264	618	13
9	Whitehaven	20	5	1	14	328	546	11
10	Rochdale Hornets	20	2	2	16	348	602	6
11	Batley	20	2	2	16	230	668	6

Champions	Relegated

== Premiership ==
8 September 1996

Salford Reds	19 – 6	Keighley Cougars
Try: Naylor, Blakeley; Goal: Blakeley (3); Drop goal: Blakeley		Try: Cantillon; Goal: Irving

Old Trafford, Manchester
Referee: Stuart Cummings
Player of the Match: Cliff Eccles

== Statistics ==
The following are the top points scorers in Division One during the 1996 season. Statistics are for league matches only.

Most tries

Player	Team	Tries
Jason Critchley	Keighley Cougars	21
Nathan McAvoy	Salford Reds	16
Darren Rogers	Salford Reds	16
Brad Davis	Wakefield Trinity	15
Dean Hanger	Huddersfield Giants	15
Eddie Rombo	Featherstone Rovers	15
Fata Sini	Salford Reds	15
Andrew King	Keighley Cougars	14
Martin Pearson	Featherstone Rovers	14
Nick Pinkney	Keighley Cougars	14
Tevita Vaikona	Hull Sharks	14

Most goals

Player	Team	Goals
Steve Blakeley	Salford Reds	84
Martin Pearson	Featherstone Rovers	81
Mark Hewitt	Hull Sharks	67
Brad Davis	Wakefield Trinity	62
Christian Tyrer	Widnes	54
Keith Dixon	Keighley Cougars	46
Barry Eaton	Dewsbury	42
Craig Booth	Rochdale Hornets	26
Steve Booth	Huddersfield Giants	26
Greg Austin	Huddersfield Giants	25

Most points

Player	Team	Tries	Goals	DGs	Points
Martin Pearson	Featherstone Rovers	14	81	1	219
Steve Blakeley	Salford Reds	9	84	0	204
Brad Davis	Wakefield Trinity	15	62	3	187
Mark Hewitt	Hull Sharks	1	67	0	138
Christian Tyrer	Widnes	6	54	3	135
Keith Dixon	Keighley Cougars	5	46	0	112
Barry Eaton	Dewsbury	2	42	1	93
Greg Austin	Huddersfield Giants	10	25	0	90
Jason Critchley	Keighley Cougars	21	0	0	84
Fata Sini	Salford Reds	15	10	0	80

== See also ==
- Super League war
- 1996 Challenge Cup
