= 1997 Salford Reds season =

- Super League II Rank: 6th
- Play-off result: Premiership Trophy quarter final
- Challenge Cup: Semi final
- 1997 record: Wins: 15; draws: 0; losses: 13
- Points scored: For: 581; against: 609

Team information
- Coach: Andy Gregory
- Stadium: The Willows

The 1997 Salford Reds season was the 101st season in the club's rugby league history and the first season in the Super League. Coached by Andy Gregory, the Salford Reds competed in Super League II and finished in 6th place. The club also reached the semi-finals of the Challenge Cup before being knocked out by St. Helens.

== Table ==
Pos	Team	Pld	W	D	L	PF	PA	PD	Pts	Relegation
1	Bradford Bulls (C)	22	20	0	2	769	397	+372	40	
2	London Broncos	22	15	3	4	616	418	+198	33	
3	St Helens	22	14	1	7	592	506	+86	29	
4	Wigan	22	14	0	8	683	398	+285	28	
5	Leeds Rhinos	22	13	1	8	544	463	+81	27	
6	Salford Reds	22	11	0	11	428	495	−67	22	
7	Halifax Blue Sox	22	8	2	12	524	549	−25	18	
8	Sheffield Eagles	22	9	0	13	415	574	−159	18	
9	Warrington Wolves	22	8	0	14	437	647	−210	16	
10	Castleford Tigers	22	5	2	15	334	515	−181	12	
11	Paris Saint-Germain	22	6	0	16	362	572	−210	12	
12	Oldham Bears (R)	22	4	1	17	461	631	−170	9	Relegated to Division One

Source: Rugby League Project
Rules for classification: 1) Points; 2) Points difference; 3) Number of points scored;
(C) Champions; (R) Relegated

== Squad ==
No	Player
2	Fata Sini
3	Scott Naylor
4	Nathan McAvoy
5	Darren Rogers
6	Steve Blakeley
7	Mark Lee
8	Andy Platt
9	Peter Edwards
10	Cliff Eccles
11	Paul Forber
12	John Cartwright
13	Craig Randall
14	Scott Martin
15	David Hulme
16	Lokeni Savello
17	Andy Burgess
18	Ian Watson
19	Paul Southern
20	Phil Knowles
21	Phil Coussons
22	Ian Blease
23	Esene Faimalo
25	Gary Broadbent
31	Dave Bradbury
