= Tom Bergin Trophy =

The Tom Bergin Trophy was an award given to the man-of-the-match in the annual Championship Grand Final. The award is named after Tom Bergin, a former president of the Rugby League Writers' Association and former editor for the Salford City Reporter. The trophy was first awarded in the Second Division Premiership Final of the 1986–87 season.

In 1998, the Divisional Premiership final was replaced with a play-off system, and the trophy continued to be used as a man-of-the-match award for the Grand Final of the second division. The trophy was last awarded in 2014 to Martyn Ridyard.

Following the introduction of the Super 8s in the 2015 season, the Championship Grand Final was replaced by the Million Pound Game, and the trophy was no longer used. Despite the reintroduction of the Grand Final in 2019, the award was not reinstated.

== Recipients ==
Season	Recipient	Team	Opponent	Ref
1986–87	Gary Ainsworth	Swinton	Hunslet	
1987–88	Des Foy	Oldham	Featherstone Rovers	
1988–89	Mark Aston	Sheffield Eagles	Swinton	
1989–90	Mike Ford	Oldham	Hull Kingston Rovers	
1990–91	Steve Kerry	Salford Red Devils	Halifax	
1991–92	Daryl Powell	Sheffield Eagles	Oldham	
1992–93	Paul Newlove	Featherstone Rovers	Workington Town	
1993–94	Dean Marwood	Workington Town	London Crusaders	
1994–95	Martin Wood	Keighley Cougars	Huddersfield	
1995–96	Not awarded	Not awarded	Not awarded	
1996	Cliff Eccles	Salford Reds	Keighley Cougars	
1997	Craig Weston	Huddersfield Giants	Hull	
1998	Richard Chapman	Featherstone Rovers	Wakefield Trinity	
1999	Latham Tawhai	Hunslet Hawks	Dewsbury Rams	
2000	Mick Higham	Leigh Centurions	Dewsbury Rams	
2001	Phil Cantillon	Widnes Vikings	Oldham	
2002	Chris Thorman	Huddersfield Giants	Leigh Centurions	
2003	Gavin Clinch	Salford City Reds	Leigh Centurions	
2004	Neil Turley	Leigh Centurions	Whitehaven	
2005	Brad Davis	Castleford Tigers	Whitehaven	
2006	Ben Cockayne	Hull Kingston Rovers	Widnes Vikings	
2007	Danny Brough	Castleford Tigers	Widnes Vikings	
2008	?			
2009	Ben Black	Halifax	Barrow Raiders	
2010	Tommy Saxton	Featherstone Rovers	Halifax	
2011	Liam Finn	Featherstone Rovers	Sheffield Eagles	
2012	Michael Knowles	Sheffield Eagles	Featherstone Rovers	
2013	Dominic Brambani	Sheffield Eagles	Batley Bulldogs	
2014	Martyn Ridyard	Leigh Centurions	Featherstone Rovers	
