= 1999 Northern Ford Premiership =

Premiership
- League: Northern Ford Premiership
- Duration: 28 Rounds
- Teams: 18

1999 Season
- Grand Final winners: Hunslet Hawks
- League leaders: Dewsbury Rams
- Tom Bergin Trophy: Latham Tawhai

The 1999 Northern Ford Premiership season was the second tier of British rugby league during the 1999 season. The competition featured eighteen teams, with Dewsbury Rams finishing as league leaders and Hunslet Hawks winning the Grand Final.

== Championship ==
The league was won by Dewsbury Rams. Dewsbury also reached the Grand Final, but lost to Hunslet Hawks, with Hunslet's Latham Tawhai winning the Tom Bergin Trophy. Hunslet were not promoted to the Super League however, as their stadium did not meet the minimum requirements to be accepted into the league.

=== League table ===
	Team	Pld	W	D	L	PF	PA	Pts
1	Dewsbury Rams	28	21	2	5	710	449	44
2	Hunslet Hawks	28	21	0	7	845	401	42
3	Widnes Vikings	28	21	0	7	792	415	42
4	Leigh Centurions	28	21	0	7	802	524	42
5	Featherstone Rovers	28	19	1	8	714	466	39
6	Hull Kingston Rovers	28	19	1	8	573	425	39
7	York Wasps	28	17	1	10	569	425	35
8	Whitehaven Warriors	28	16	0	12	651	620	32
9	Keighley Cougars	28	14	1	13	584	612	29
10	Barrow Raiders	28	12	0	16	660	718	24
11	Bramley	28	11	1	16	489	596	23
12	Batley Bulldogs	28	9	3	16	546	553	21
13	Swinton Lions	28	10	0	18	645	641	20
14	Workington Town	28	9	1	18	468	813	19
15	Rochdale Hornets	28	9	0	19	539	724	18
16	Lancashire Lynx	28	7	0	21	544	889	14
17	Oldham R.L.F.C.	28	5	2	21	449	999	12
18	Doncaster Dragons	28	4	1	23	473	911	9

Play-offs

== Play-offs ==
=== Week 1 ===
Leigh Centurions 4–17 Featherstone Rovers

Hunslet Hawks 21–24 Widnes Vikings

=== Week 2 ===
Dewsbury Rams 28–6 Widnes Vikings

Hunslet Hawks 17–9 Featherstone Rovers

=== Week 3 ===
Hunslet Hawks 10–8 Widnes Vikings

=== Grand Final ===
25 September 1999

Hunslet Hawks	12 – 11	Dewsbury Rams
Try: Cook, Higgins; Goal: Ross; Drop goal: Tawhai, Leighton		Try: Flynn, Ball; Goal: Eaton; Drop goal: Agar

Headingley, Leeds
Referee: Steve Ganson (St. Helens)
Player of the Match: Latham Tawhai

== See also ==
- 1999 Challenge Cup
