= 2000 Northern Ford Premiership =

Premiership
- League: Northern Ford Premiership
- Duration: 28 Rounds
- Teams: 18

2000 Season
- Grand Final winners: Dewsbury Rams
- League leaders: Dewsbury Rams
- Tom Bergin Trophy: Mick Higham

The 2000 Premiership season was the second tier of British rugby league during the 2000 season. The competition featured eighteen teams, with Dewsbury Rams finishing as league leaders and winning the Grand Final.

== Championship ==
The league was won by the Dewsbury Rams. The Dewsbury Rams also reached the Grand Final and defeated Leigh Centurions, with Leigh Centurions' Mick Higham winning the Tom Bergin Trophy. The Dewsbury Rams were not promoted to the Super League however, as their stadium did not meet the minimum requirements to be accepted into the league.

=== League table ===
	Team	Pld	W	D	L	PF	PA	Pts
1	Dewsbury Rams	28	22	1	5	848	400	45
2	Keighley Cougars	28	22	0	6	1002	401	44
3	Doncaster Dragons	28	21	0	7	880	397	42
4	Leigh Centurions	28	21	0	7	854	476	42
5	Featherstone Rovers	28	20	1	7	795	523	41
6	Oldham	28	19	1	8	734	513	39
7	Hull Kingston Rovers	28	17	1	10	583	481	35
8	Widnes Vikings	28	17	0	11	698	483	34
9	Swinton Lions	28	13	2	13	726	733	28
10	Barrow Raiders	28	14	0	14	647	711	28
11	Whitehaven Warriors	28	11	1	16	533	674	23
12	Workington Town	28	11	1	16	502	776	23
13	Rochdale Hornets	28	10	0	18	563	696	20
14	Sheffield Eagles	28	9	1	18	479	585	19
15	Hunslet Hawks	28	8	0	20	487	678	16
16	Batley Bulldogs	28	6	0	22	482	759	12
17	York Wasps	28	5	1	22	392	859	11
18	Lancashire Lynx	28	1	0	27	301	1361	2

Play-offs

== Play-offs ==
=== Grand Final ===
29 July 2000

Dewsbury Rams	13 – 12	Leigh Centurions
Try: Eaton, Long; Goal: Eaton (2); Drop goal: Agar	Report	Try: Higham (2); Goal: Bretherton (2)

Gigg Lane, Bury
Attendance: 8,487
Referee: R. Connolly (Wigan)
Player of the Match: Mick Higham

== See also ==
- 2000 Challenge Cup
