= 1997 RFL Division Two =

RFL Division Two
- League: Rugby Football League Division Two
- Duration: 20 Rounds
- Teams: 11

1997 Season
- Champions: Hunslet Hawks

The 1997 Division Two Championship season was the third tier of British rugby league during the 1997 season.

== Championship ==
The league was won by Hunslet Hawks, winning promotion to Division One along with Rochdale Hornets and Leigh Centurions.

=== League table ===
	Team	Pld	W	D	L	PF	PA	Pts
1	Hunslet Hawks	20	15	0	5	682	256	30
2	Rochdale Hornets	20	15	0	5	680	347	30
3	Leigh Centurions	20	15	0	5	546	346	30
4	Batley Bulldogs	20	14	0	6	600	435	28
5	Carlisle Border Raiders	20	13	0	7	564	384	26
6	Lancashire Lynx	20	12	0	8	552	393	24
7	York Wasps	20	8	0	12	502	517	16
8	Barrow Braves	20	7	0	13	335	632	14
9	Bramley	20	5	1	14	353	513	11
10	Doncaster Dragons	20	3	1	16	247	668	7
11	Prescot Panthers	20	2	0	18	247	817	4

Champions	Promoted

== See also ==
- Super League war
- 1997 Challenge Cup
