= 2021 RFL League 1 results =

Rugby league competition results

The fixture list for the 2021 season was issued on 14 February 2021. The regular season comprised 18 rounds.

The end-of-season play-offs featured the clubs finishing second to sixth in the regular season in a four round elimination competition to decide which team accompanied the team finishing first into the Championship for 2022.

Four matches were postponed due under the RFL COVID-19 protocols and were not rearranged.

All times are UK local time (UTC+1) on the relevant dates.

== Regular season ==
=== Round 1 ===
Betfred League 1: round one
Home	Score	Away	Match Information
Home	Score	Away	Date and Time	Venue	Referee	Attendance
London Skolars	24–44	North Wales Crusaders	8 May 2021, 15:30	New River Stadium	J. Vella	—N/a (Note: Matches played behind closed doors due to COVID-19 restrictions)
Hunslet	16–28	Workington Town	9 May 2021, 14:00	South Leeds Stadium	C. Worsley	—N/a
Coventry Bears	20–38	Barrow Raiders	9 May 2021, 15:00	Butts Park Arena	M. Rossleigh	—N/a
Keighley Cougars	44–18	Doncaster	9 May 2021, 15:00	Cougar Park	J. McMullen	—N/a
Rochdale Hornets	40–16	West Wales Raiders	9 May 2021, 15:00	Crown Oil Arena	M. Mannifield	—N/a

=== Round 2 ===
Betfred League 1: round two
Home	Score	Away	Match Information
Home	Score	Away	Date and Time	Venue	Referee	Attendance
North Wales Crusaders	18–26	Hunslet	15 May 2021, 14:30	Eirias Stadium	M. Rossleigh	—N/a (Note: Matches played behind closed doors due to COVID-19 restrictions)
West Wales Raiders	10–36	Coventry Bears	15 May 2021, 15:00	Stebonheath Park	L. Staveley	—N/a
Workington Town	50–16	London Skolars	16 May 2021, 14:00	Derwent Park	J. McMullen	—N/a
Barrow Raiders	40–18	Keighley Cougars	16 May 2021, 15:00	Matt Johnson Prestige Stadium	M. Mannifield	—N/a
Doncaster	30–22	Rochdale Hornets	16 May 2021, 15:00	Keepmoat Stadium	N. Bennett	—N/a

=== Round 3 ===
Betfred League 1: round three
Home	Score	Away	Match Information
Home	Score	Away	Date and Time	Venue	Referee	Attendance (Note: Limited attendances allowed but by home fans only.)
Doncaster	62–24	West Wales Raiders	23 May 2021, 14:30	Keepmoat Stadium	C. Worsley	784
North Wales Crusaders	16–44	Workington Town	23 May 2021, 14:30	Eirias Stadium	T. Crashley	—N/a (Note: Match played behind closed doors due to COVID-19 restrictions)
Coventry Bears	26–44	London Skolars	23 May 2021, 15:00	Butts Park Arena	L. Staveley	210
Hunslet	6–29	Barrow Raiders	23 May 2021, 15:00	South Leeds Stadium	M. Smaill	452
Keighley Cougars	36–43	Rochdale Hornets	23 May 2021, 15:00	Cougar Park	K. Moore	700

=== Round 4 ===
Betfred League 1: round four
Home	Score	Away	Match Information
Home	Score	Away	Date and Time	Venue	Referee	Attendance (Note: Limited attendances allowed in England under COVID-19 restrictions)
West Wales Raiders	10–52	London Skolars	29 May 2021, 15:00	Stebonheath Park	T. Crashley	—N/a (Note: COVID-19 regulations in Wales did not permit spectator attendance at matches on this date)
Workington Town	24–26	Doncaster	30 May 2021, 14:00	Derwent Park	M. Mannifield	942
Barrow Raiders	44–8	North Wales Crusaders	30 May 2021, 15:00	Matt Johnson Prestige Stadium	K. Moore	1,915
Coventry Bears	38–30	Rochdale Hornets	30 May 2021, 15:00	Butts Park Arena	A. Sweet	232
Keighley Cougars	40–0	Hunslet	30 May 2021, 15:00	Cougar Park	N. Bennett	683

=== Round 5 ===
Betfred League 1: round five
Home	Score	Away	Match Information
Home	Score	Away	Date and Time	Venue	Referee	Attendance (Note: Limited attendances allowed in England under COVID-19 restrictions)
West Wales Raiders	10–60	Barrow Raiders	5 June 2021, 15:00	Stebonheath Park	A. Sweet	—N/a (Note: COVID-19 regulations in Wales did not permit spectator attendance at matches on this date)
Workington Town	34–20	Keighley Cougars	6 June 2021, 14:00	Derwent Park	G. Hewer	942
North Wales Crusaders	36–12	Coventry Bears	6 June 2021, 14:30	Eirias Stadium	C. Worsley	—N/a
Doncaster	46–12	London Skolars	6 June 2021, 15:00	Keepmoat Stadium	J. McMullen	882
Hunslet	36–22	Rochdale Hornets	6 June 2021, 15:00	South Leeds Stadium	A. Moore	483

=== Round 6 ===
Betfred League 1: round six
Home	Score	Away	Match Information
Home	Score	Away	Date and Time	Venue	Referee	Attendance
Barrow Raiders	40–4	Rochdale Hornets	12 June 2021, 15:00	Matt Johnson Prestige Stadium	C. Worsley	1,758
London Skolars	10–62	Hunslet	12 June 2021, 15:30	New River Stadium	K. Moore	370
Coventry Bears	12–30	Workington Town	13 June 2021, 15:00	Butts Park Arena	T. Crashley	198
Keighley Cougars	70–12	West Wales Raiders	13 June 2021, 15:00	Cougar Park	M. Rossleigh	463
North Wales Crusaders	0–68	Doncaster	13 June 2021, 15:00	Eirias Stadium	J. Vella	—N/a (Note: COVID-19 regulations in Wales did not permit spectator attendance at matches on this date)

=== Round 7 ===
Betfred League 1: round seven
Home	Score	Away	Match Information
Home	Score	Away	Date and Time	Venue	Referee	Attendance
West Wales Raiders	10–60	North Wales Crusaders	19 June 2021, 15:00	Stebonheath Park	M. Rossleigh	285
London Skolars	14–24	Barrow Raiders	19 June 2021, 15:30	New River Stadium	J. Vella	391
Workington Town	34–28	Rochdale Hornets	20 June 2021, 14:00	Derwent Park	C. Smith	942
Coventry Bears	24–18	Keighley Cougars	16 July 2021, 20:00 (Note: Match original scheduled for 20 June but postponed on 18 June under RFL COVID-19 protocols due to a number of Keighley players either testing positive or being required to self-isolate.)	Butts Park Arena	K. Moore	387
Hunslet	18–18	Doncaster	20 June 2021, 15:00	South Leeds Stadium	L. Staveley	527

=== Round 8 ===
Betfred League 1: round eight
Home	Score	Away	Match Information
Home	Score	Away	Date and Time	Venue	Referee	Attendance
West Wales Raiders	12–38	Hunslet	26 June 2021, 15:00	Stebonheath Park	C. Smith	100
Barrow Raiders	24–24	Workington Town	27 June 2021, 15:00	Craven Park	T. Crashley	3,146
Coventry Bears	16–34	Doncaster	27 June 2021, 15:00	Butts Park Arena	K. Moore	275
Keighley Cougars	34–22	London Skolars	27 June 2021, 15:00	Cougar Park	B. Milligan	548
Rochdale Hornets	38–28	North Wales Crusaders	27 June 2021, 15:00	Crown Oil Arena	J. Vella	1,389

=== Round 9 ===
Betfred League 1: round nine
Home	Score	Away	Match Information
Home	Score	Away	Date and Time	Venue	Referee	Attendance
Workington Town	66–0	West Wales Raiders	4 July 2021, 14:00	Derwent Park	L. Bland	942
North Wales Crusaders	34–28	Keighley Cougars	4 July 2021, 14:30	Eirias Stadium	M. Smaill	437
Barrow Raiders	31–6	Doncaster	4 July 2021, 15:00	Craven Park	C. Smith	2,005
Coventry Bears	46–44	Hunslet	4 July 2021, 15:00	Butts Park Arena	B. Milligan	255
Rochdale Hornets	22–4	London Skolars	4 July 2021, 15:00	Crown Oil Arena	A. Sweet	1,171

=== Round 10 ===
Betfred League 1: round ten
Home	Score	Away	Match Information
Home	Score	Away	Date and Time	Venue	Referee	Attendance
West Wales Raiders	18–30	Rochdale Hornets	10 July 2021, 15:00	Stebonheath Park	J. Jones	318
Workington Town	P–P	Coventry Bears	Not rearranged (Note: Match postponed under RFL COVID-19 protocols due to a number of Workington players either testing positive or having to self-isolate.)	Derwent Park
Hunslet	24–34	North Wales Crusaders	11 July 2021, 15:00	South Leeds Stadium	K. Moore	404
Keighley Cougars	40–12	Barrow Raiders	11 July 2021, 15:00	Cougar Park	N. Bennett	572
London Skolars	16–16	Doncaster	16 July 2021, 19:00	New River Stadium	M. Rossleigh	575

=== Round 11 ===
Betfred League 1: round eleven
Home	Score	Away	Match Information
Home	Score	Away	Date and Time	Venue	Referee	Attendance
London Skolars	46–30	West Wales Raiders	24 July 2021, 15:30	New River Stadium	J. Jones	196
Doncaster	P–P	North Wales Crusaders	Not rearranged (Note: Match postponed under RFL COVID-19 protocols after Doncaster reported more than seven players isolating.)	Keepmoat Stadium
Barrow Raiders	40–12	Coventry Bears	25 July 2021, 15:00	Craven Park	M. Smaill	1,862
Hunslet	20–20	Keighley Cougars	25 July 2021, 15:00	South Leeds Stadium	C. Smith	714
Rochdale Hornets	P–P	Workington Town	Not rearranged (Note: Match postponed under RFL COVID-19 protocols after Rochdale reported more than seven players isolating.)	Crown Oil Arena

=== Round 12 ===
Betfred League 1: round twelve
Home	Score	Away	Match Information
Home	Score	Away	Date and Time	Venue	Referee	Attendance
London Skolars	12–14	Coventry Bears	31 July 2021, 15:30	New River Stadium	L. Rush	190
Workington Town	P–P	Barrow Raiders	Not rearranged (Note: Match postponed under COVID-19 protocols after Barrow reported seven or more players required to self-isolated through positive tests or close contacts.)	Derwent Park
Doncaster	24–46	Hunslet	1 August 2021, 14:30	Keepmoat Stadium	M. Rossleigh	1,179
North Wales Crusaders	72–4	West Wales Raiders	1 August 2021, 14:30	Eirias Stadium	J. Vella	610
Rochdale Hornets	20–42	Keighley Cougars	1 August 2021, 15:00	Crown Oil Arena	J. Jones	891

=== Round 13 ===
Betfred League 1: round thirteen
Home	Score	Away	Match Information
Home	Score	Away	Date and Time	Venue	Referee	Attendance
West Wales Raiders	24–24	Doncaster	7 August 2021, 15:00	Stebonheath Park	L. Rush	180
London Skolars	34–38	Rochdale Hornets	7 August 2021, 15:30	New River Stadium	J. Vella	208
Barrow Raiders	40–10	Hunslet	8 August 2021, 15:00	Craven Park	M. Mannifield	1,918
Coventry Bears	16–32	North Wales Crusaders	8 August 2021, 15:00	Butts Park Arena	C. Smith	378
Keighley Cougars	18–22	Workington Town	8 August 2021, 15:00	Cougar Park	M. Smaills	774

=== Round 14 ===
Betfred League 1: round fourteen
Home	Score	Away	Match Information
Home	Score	Away	Date and Time	Venue	Referee	Attendance
West Wales Raiders	24–36	Workington Town	14 August 2021, 15:00	Stebonheath Park	K. Moore	239
North Wales Crusaders	23–10	Barrow Raiders	15 August 2021, 14:30	Eirias Stadium	M. Smaill	727
Hunslet	38–10	London Skolars	15 August 2021, 15:00	South Leeds Stadium	C. Worsley	435
Keighley Cougars	46–18	Coventry Bears	15 August 2021, 15:00	Cougar Park	L. Staveley	1,028
Rochdale Hornets	44–8	Doncaster	15 August 2021, 15:00	Crown Oil Arena	J. Jones	882

=== Round 15 ===
Betfred League 1: round fifteen
Home	Score	Away	Match Information
Home	Score	Away	Date and Time	Venue	Referee	Attendance
London Skolars	14–34	Keighley Cougars	21 August 2021, 15:00	New River Stadium	L. Bland	228
Workington Town	18–40	North Wales Crusaders	22 August 2021, 14:00	Derwent Park	C. Smith	1,457
Coventry Bears	50–18	West Wales Raiders	22 August 2021, 15:00	Butts Park Arena	M. Smaill	280
Doncaster	26–18	Barrow Raiders	22 August 2021, 15:00	Keepmoat Stadium	K. Moore	1,019
Rochdale Hornets	34–34	Hunslet	22 August 2021, 15:00	Crown Oil Arena	L. Rush	822

=== Round 16 ===
Betfred League 1: round sixteen
Home	Score	Away	Match Information
Home	Score	Away	Date and Time	Venue	Referee	Attendance
Barrow Raiders	38–24	London Skolars	28 August 2021, 14:00	Craven Park	L. Rush	1,486
North Wales Crusaders	36–10	Rochdale Hornets	28 August 2021, 14:30	Eirias Stadium	M. Mannifield	617
West Wales Raiders	12–42	Keighley Cougars	28 August 2021, 15:00	Stebonheath Park	J. Jones	267
Doncaster	22–12	Workington Town	29 August 2021, 15:00	Keepmoat Stadium	C. Smith	948
Hunslet	32–30	Coventry Bears	29 August 2021, 15:00	South Leeds Stadium	J. Vella	353

=== Round 17 ===
Betfred League 1: round seventeen
Home	Score	Away	Match Information
Home	Score	Away	Date and Time	Venue	Referee	Attendance
London Skolars	18–35	Workington Town	4 September 2021, 15:30	New River Stadium	A. Sweet	241
Doncaster	18–13	Coventry Bears	5 September 2021, 15:00	Keepmoat Stadium	K. Moore	1,138
Hunslet	82–6	West Wales Raiders	5 September 2021, 15:00	South Leeds Stadium	L. Bland	474
Keighley Cougars	34–14	North Wales Crusaders	5 September 2021, 15:00	Cougar Park	L. Staveley	1,327
Rochdale Hornets	30–32	Barrow Raiders	5 September 2021, 15:00	Crown Oil Arena	J. Jones	1,064

=== Round 18 ===
Betfred League 1: round eighteen
Home	Score	Away	Match Information
Home	Score	Away	Date and Time	Venue	Referee	Attendance
North Wales Crusaders	44–0	London Skolars	11 September 2021, 14:30	Eirias Stadium	B. Milligan	560
Barrow Raiders	76–0	West Wales Raiders	11 September 2021, 15:00	Craven Park	J. McMullen	1,922
Workington Town	14–32	Hunslet	12 September 2021, 14:00	Derwent Park	T. Crashley	1,397
Doncaster	26–28	Keighley Cougars	12 September 2021, 14:30	Keepmoat Stadium	M. Mannifield	738
Rochdale Hornets	50–22	Coventry Bears	12 September 2021, 15:00	Crown Oil Arena	M. Smaill	693

== Play-offs ==
Workington Town, who finished the regular season in second place, advanced straight to the qualifying semi-final in the second week of the play-offs. Teams that finished 3rd to 6th after the regular season played off in qualifying and elimination play-offs respectively. Keighley Cougars defeated North Wales Crusaders in the qualifying play-off and proceeded to the qualifying play-off against Workington Town, where they lost. Doncaster defeated Hunslet in the elimination play-off which resulted in the latter being eliminated from the play-offs. Doncaster then proceeded to defeat North Wales in the elimination semi-final which saw them advance to the preliminary final against Keighley.

=== Team bracket ===
Qualifying play-off
3	North Wales Crusaders	14
4	Keighley Cougars	28
5	Doncaster	31
6	Hunslet	10

Qualifying semi-final
2	Workington Town	18
Keighley Cougars	16
Elimination semi-final
North Wales Crusaders	34
Doncaster	48

Preliminary final
Keighley Cougars	26
Doncaster	28

Promotion play-off final
Workington Town	36
Doncaster	12

=== Week 1: Elimination and qualifying play-offs ===
Qualifying play-off

18 September 2021
18:30 BST (UTC+01)

North Wales Crusaders	14 – 28	Keighley Cougars
	Report

Eirias Stadium, Colwyn Bay
Attendance: 488
Referee: Michael Smaill

Elimination play-off

19 September 2021
16:00 BST (UTC+01)

Doncaster	31 – 10	Hunslet
	Report

Keepmoat Stadium, Doncaster
Attendance: 547
Referee: Nick Bennett

=== Week 2: Semi-finals ===
Qualifying semi-final

26 September 2021
14:00 BST (UTC+01)

Workington Town	18 – 16 (Note: After golden point extra time)	Keighley Cougars
	Report

Derwent Park, Workington
Attendance: 1,221
Referee: Marcus Griffiths

Elimination semi-final

26 September 2021
16:30 BST (UTC+01)

North Wales Crusaders	34 – 48	Doncaster
	Report

Eirias Stadium, Colwyn Bay
Attendance: 432
Referee: Tom Grant

=== Week 3: Preliminary final ===
Preliminary final

3 October 2021
15:00 BST (UTC+01)

Keighley Cougars	26 – 28	Doncaster
	Report

Cougar Park, Keighley
Attendance: 1,128
Referee: Tom Grant

=== Week 4: Promotion play-off final ===
Promotion play-off final

10 October 2021
13:00 BST (UTC+01)

Workington Town	36 – 12	Doncaster
	Report

Derwent Park, Workington
Attendance: 2,997
Referee: Tom Grant
