= 2021 RFL League 1 =

2021 rugby league competition in the United Kingdom

- League: League 1
- Duration: 8 May 2021 – 10 October 2021
- Teams: 10
- Matches played: 92
- Points scored: 5,075
- Highest attendance: 2,997 (Workington v Doncaster, 10 October 2021)
- Lowest attendance: 100 (West Wales Raiders vs Hunslet, 26 June 2021)
- Champions: Barrow Raiders (2nd title)
- Top point-scorer: Jack Miller (Keighley) 240
- Top try-scorer(s): Tee Ritson (Barrow) 22; Rob Massam (North Wales) 22

The 2021 RFL League 1 is a professional rugby league football competition played in the United Kingdom and is the third tier of the sport for Rugby Football League (RFL) affiliated clubs. The sponsors for the league are the bookmakers, Betfred and the league will continue to be known as the Betfred League 1.

== Teams ==
The 2020 season was declared null and void due to the COVID-19 pandemic as was the 2020 Championship season, there was therefore no teams relegated to League 1 for 2021. Due to restructuring in the Championship and Super League, Newcastle Thunder were promoted to the Championship and with the planned entry of Ottawa Aces to the league deferred until 2022, the number of teams to compete in League 1 for 2021 was reduced to 10.

=== Stadiums and locations ===
Locations of the 2021 RFL League 1 teams

Team	Location	Stadium	Capacity	Coach	Captain	Chairman
Barrow Raiders	Barrow-in-Furness	Matt Johnson Prestige Stadium	6,000	(England) Paul Crarey	(Australia) Jarrad Stack	Steve Neale
Coventry Bears	Coventry	Butts Park Arena	4,000	(England) Rich Squires	(England) Liam Welham	Alan Robinson
Doncaster	Doncaster	Keepmoat Stadium	15,231	(England) Richard Horne	(England) Brad Foster	Gavin Baldwin
Hunslet	Leeds	South Leeds Stadium	4,000	(England) Alan Kilshaw	(England) Duane Straugheir	Kenny Sykes
Keighley Cougars	Keighley	Cougar Park	7,800	(Australia) Rhys Lovegrove	(England) Kyle Kesik	Michael O'Neill
London Skolars	Haringey, London	New River Stadium	2,000	(England) Jermaine Coleman	(England) Iliess Macani	Adrian Fraine
North Wales Crusaders	Colwyn Bay	Stadiwm Zip World	5,500	(England) Anthony Murray		Ian Edwards
Rochdale Hornets	Rochdale	Crown Oil Arena	10,249	(England) Matt Calland	(Wales) Sean Penkywicz	Andrew Mazey
West Wales Raiders	Llanelli	Stebonheath Park	3,700	(Australia) Aaron Wood	(Wales) Morgan Evans	Andrew Thorne
Workington Town	Workington	Zebra Claims Stadium	10,000	(England) Chris Thorman	(England) Carl Forber	Les Smallwood

== Fixtures and results ==
The season consisted of 18 rounds with each of the 10 teams playing each other home and away. Promotion and play-off details together with the fixture list were originally due to be announced early in 2021 but this announcement was delayed after a meeting on 13 January 2021 at which the start of the season was delayed to at least Spring. On 22 January it was announced that the proposed start date for the competition is the weekend of 8–9 May.

Anticipating that the continuing COVID-19 situation may affect the season, the RFL decided that league position would be based from the outset on win percentage (number of wins divided by number of games played) rather than by competition points as is normal in the league. Postponements were allowed if a team had seven or more players unavailable due to COVID-19 related reasons (e.g. having returned a positive test result or required to isolate following contact with an infected person). In the event of a postponement the clubs were to try and find a new date to play the match otherwise it would be cancelled. Golden point extra time was not used during this season except in the play-offs. The fixture list was released on 14 February and the promotion arrangements on 4 March.

== Regular season table ==
The team finishing top of the league after the regular season was automatically promoted to the Championship for 2022 with the teams finishing 2nd to 6th taking part in a five-team play-off structure culminating in the promotion play-off final, the winner of which would also be promoted to the Championship. Teams had to complete 70% of their league fixtures to qualify for the play-offs.

Pos	Team	Pld	W	D	L	PF	PA	PP	Pts	PCT	Qualification
1	Barrow Raiders	17	13	1	3	596	275	216.7	27	79.41	Champions & promoted to Championship
2	Workington Town	15	10	1	4	471	310	151.9	21	70.00	Advance to qualifying semi-final
3	North Wales Crusaders	17	11	0	6	539	410	131.5	22	64.71	Advance to qualifying play-off
4	Keighley Cougars	18	11	1	6	612	385	159.0	23	63.89	Advance to qualifying play-off
5	Doncaster	17	9	3	5	472	392	120.4	21	61.76	Advance to elimination play-off
6	Hunslet	18	9	3	6	564	435	129.7	21	58.33	Advance to elimination play-off
7	Rochdale Hornets	17	8	1	8	505	488	103.5	17	50.00	
8	Coventry Bears	17	6	0	11	405	532	76.1	12	35.29	
9	London Skolars	18	3	1	14	372	605	61.5	7	19.44	
10	West Wales Raiders	18	0	1	17	238	942	25.3	1	2.78	

Rules for classification: 1) win percentage; 2) points scored percentage (points scored divided by points conceded).

== Play-offs ==
The play-off structure and dates were confirmed on 20 August and used the same five-team play-off structure used in 2019. Matches were played on four consecutive weekends commencing 17 September.

=== Team bracket ===
Qualifying play-off
3	North Wales Crusaders	14
4	Keighley Cougars	28
5	Doncaster	31
6	Hunslet	10

Qualifying semi-final
2	Workington Town	18
Keighley Cougars	16
Elimination semi-final
North Wales Crusaders	34
Doncaster	48

Preliminary final
Keighley Cougars	26
Doncaster	28

Promotion play-off final
Workington Town	36
Doncaster	12

== Awards ==
The end of year awards for the 2021 League 1 season were announced on 29 September 2021.

Award	Winner
Betfred League 1 Player of the Year	Rob Massam (North Wales Crusaders)
Betfred League 1 Young Player of the Year	(Samoa) Phoenix Laulu-Togaga'e (Keighley Cougars)
Betfred League 1 Coach of the Year	(England) Anthony Murray (North Wales Crusaders)
Betfred League 1 Club of the Year	Barrow Raiders
