= 1998 RFL Division One =

RFL Division One
- League: Rugby Football League Division One
- Duration: 30 Rounds
- Teams: 11

1998 Season
- Grand Final winners: Wakefield Trinity
- League leaders: Wakefield Trinity
- Tom Bergin Trophy: Richard Chapman

The 1998 Division One Championship season was the second tier of British rugby league during the 1998 season. The competition featured eleven teams, with Wakefield Trinity winning the league and the inaugural Grand Final.

== Championship ==
The league was won by Wakefield Trinity. Wakefield also won the inaugural First Division Grand Final against Featherstone Rovers, and were awarded a place in the Super League. Despite being on the losing side, Richard Chapman won the Tom Bergin Trophy.

No teams were relegated, as the First and Second Divisions were merged to form a single division which would later become known as the Northern Ford Premiership.

=== League table ===
	Team	Pld	W	D	L	PF	PA	Pts
1	Wakefield Trinity	30	22	1	7	790	506	45
2	Hull Kingston Rovers	30	20	1	9	748	480	41
3	Dewsbury Rams	30	19	2	9	723	481	40
4	Featherstone Rovers	30	17	1	12	779	613	35
5	Swinton Lions	30	17	1	12	702	544	35
6	Hunslet Hawks	30	17	1	12	719	575	35
7	Keighley Cougars	30	14	1	15	587	675	29
8	Whitehaven Warriors	30	13	0	17	636	657	26
9	Widnes Vikings	30	9	1	20	601	862	19
10	Rochdale Hornets	30	6	1	23	571	912	13
11	Leigh Centurions	30	6	0	24	505	1056	12

Champions	Play-offs

== Play-offs ==
=== Week 1 ===
Featherstone Rovers 22–12 Swinton Lions

Hull Kingston Rovers 18–2 Dewsbury Rams

=== Week 2 ===
Wakefield Trinity 19–16 Hull Kingston Rovers

Dewsbury Rams 10–20 Featherstone Rovers

=== Week 3 ===
Hull Kingston Rovers 6–54 Featherstone Rovers

=== Grand Final ===
26 September 1998

Wakefield Trinity	24 – 22	Featherstone Rovers
Try: Southernwood, Bostock (2), Casey, Stephenson; Goal: Casey (2)		Try: Baker, Jackson, Collins, Hall; Goal: Chapman (3)

Alfred McAlpine Stadium, Huddersfield
Attendance: 8,224
Referee: Nick Oddy (Halifax)
Player of the Match: Richard Chapman

== See also ==
- 1998 Challenge Cup
