= Danny Ansell =

Wales international rugby league footballer

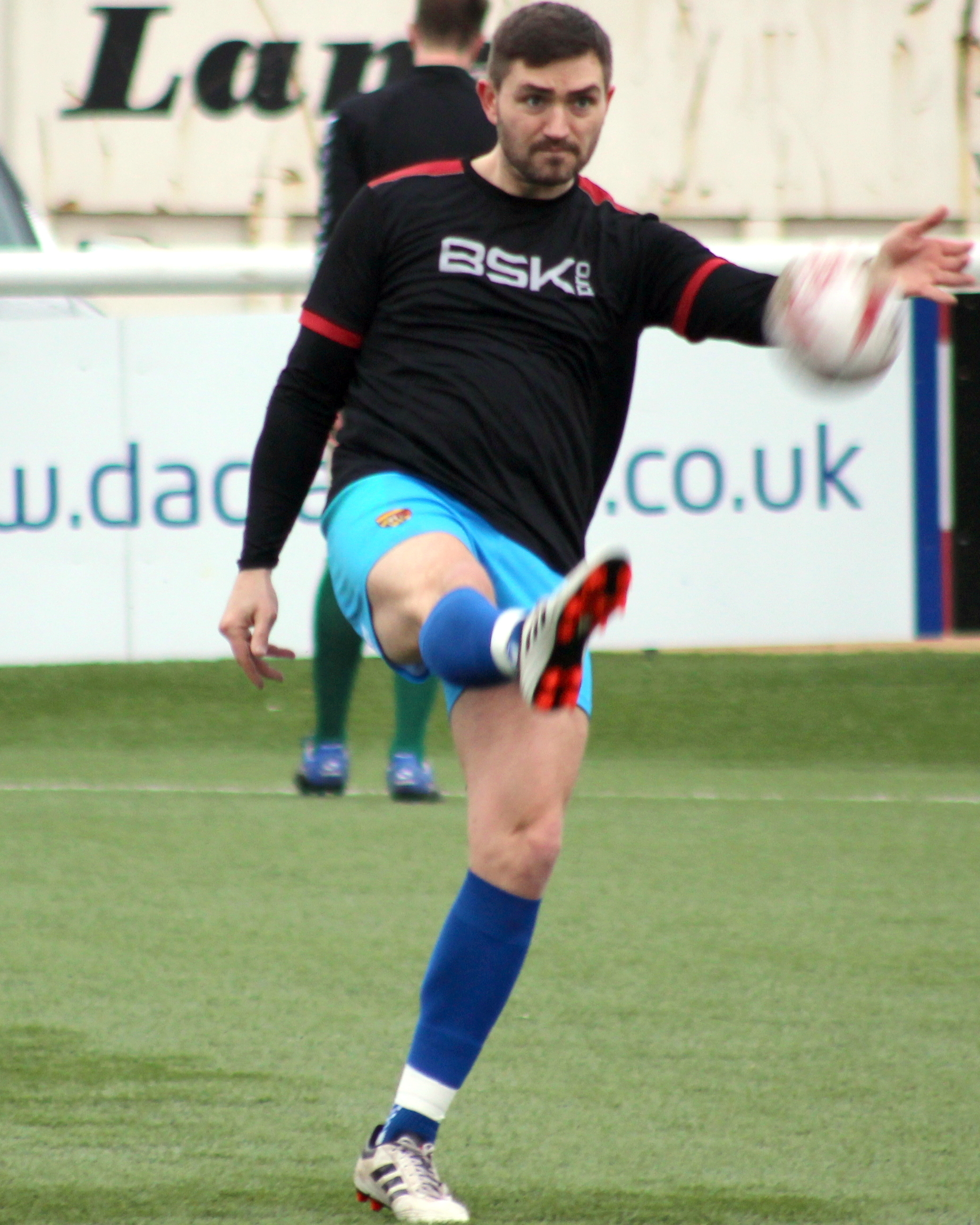

Personal information
- Born: 9 October 1991 (age 34) Wakefield, West Yorkshire, England

Playing information
- Position: Scrum-half
Club
Years	Team	Pld	T	G	FG	P
2012–17	Hunslet Hawks	83	15	108	3	269
2018	Swinton Lions	1	0	0	0	0
2018	Dewsbury Rams	6	1	0	0	4
	Total	90	16	108	3	273
Representative
Years	Team	Pld	T	G	FG	P
2016–17	Wales	2	0	0	0	0
- Source: As of 29 April 2018
- Relatives: Barry Eaton (uncle)

Danny Ansell (born 9 October 1991) is a former rugby league footballer who played as a scrum-half.

He has played at representative level for Wales, and at club level for Hunslet Hawks, Swinton Lions, and in the Championship for the Dewsbury Rams .

== Background ==
Ansell was born in Wakefield, West Yorkshire, England.

== Playing career ==
Ansell played junior rugby league for the Stanley Rangers ARLFC before being signed by the Huddersfield Giants.

Ansell joined the Hunslet Hawks in 2012 from the Wakefield Trinity Wildcats.

He made his début for Wales in 2016, playing against Italy. He was named in Wales 2017 Rugby League World Cup squad.

His uncle, Barry Eaton, played in the 2000 Rugby League World Cup.
