= 1997 RFL Division One =

RFL Division One
- League: Rugby Football League Division One
- Duration: 20 Rounds
- Teams: 11

1997 Season
- Divisional Premiership winners: Huddersfield Giants
- Champions: Hull Sharks
- Tom Bergin Trophy: Craig Weston

The 1997 Division One Championship season was the second tier of British rugby league during the 1997 season. The competition featured eleven teams, with Hull Sharks winning the league, and Huddersfield Giants winning the Divisional Premiership.

== Championship ==
The league was won by Hull Sharks, winning promotion to the Super League along with runners-up the Huddersfield Giants. The Huddersfield Giants also won the Divisional Premiership final against Hull FC, with Craig Weston winning the Tom Bergin Trophy.

The Widnes Vikings and Workington Town were both relegated to Division Two.

=== League table ===
	Team	Pld	W	D	L	PF	PA	Pts
1	Hull Sharks	20	18	1	1	617	228	37
2	Huddersfield Giants	20	16	0	4	630	320	32
3	Keighley Cougars	20	11	1	8	428	332	23
4	Whitehaven Warriors	20	11	1	8	436	398	23
5	Wakefield Trinity	20	9	1	10	393	419	19
6	Dewsbury Rams	20	9	0	11	341	455	18
7	Featherstone Rovers	20	8	1	11	408	395	17
8	Hull Kingston Rovers	20	8	1	11	440	481	17
9	Swinton Lions	20	7	0	13	355	488	14
10	Widnes Vikings	20	6	0	14	282	579	12
11	Workington Town	20	4	0	16	320	555	8

Champions	Promoted	Relegated

== Premiership ==
28 September 1997

Huddersfield Giants	18 – 0	Hull Sharks
Try: Davys, Bunyan, Cheetham; Goal: Cook (3)	Report

Old Trafford, Manchester
Referee: John Connolly (Wigan)
Player of the Match: Craig Weston

== See also ==
- 1997 Challenge Cup
