= Justin Collins =

Justin Collins may refer to:

- Justin Lee Collins, British TV personality and actor
- Justin Collins (rugby union), New Zealand player
- Steve Collins (rugby league), rugby league player misidentified as Justin
- Justin Collins (Dark Shadows), fictional character
