= 2025 RFL Championship season results =

The fixture list for the 2025 RFL Championship was issued on 26 November 2024.

All times, including matches played in France, are UK local time (UTC±00:00 until 29 March 2025, UTC+01:00 thereafter).

== Regular season ==
=== Round 1 ===
Betfred Championship: round one
Home	Score	Away	Match Information
Home	Score	Away	Date and Time	Venue	Referee	Attendance
Toulouse Olympique	14–18	Widnes Vikings	15 February 2025, 17:00	Stade Ernest-Wallon	R. Cox	2,133
Barrow Raiders	38–12	Hunslet	16 February 2025, 15:00	Craven Park	M. Lynn	1,604
Bradford Bulls	20–6	London Broncos	16 February 2025, 15:00	Odsal Stadium	W. Turley	2,698
Featherstone Rovers	22–4	Doncaster	16 February 2025, 15:00	Post Office Road	S. Mikalauskas	1,854
Sheffield Eagles	14–28	Halifax Panthers	16 February 2025, 15:00	Steel City Stadium	C. Worsley	1,101
Oldham	50–4	York Knights	16 February 2025, 15:00	Boundary Park	M. Griffiths	1,525

=== Round 2 ===
Betfred Championship: round two
Home	Score	Away	Match Information
Home	Score	Away	Date and Time	Venue	Referee	Attendance
Halifax Panthers	24–14	Barrow Raiders	23 February 2025, 15:00	The Shay	K. Moore
Hunslet	20–38	Bradford Bulls	23 February 2025, 15:00	South Leeds Stadium	R. Cox	1,470
London Broncos	14–12	Featherstone Rovers	23 February 2025, 15:00	Plough Lane	M. Lynn	800
Oldham	18–18	Batley Bulldogs	23 February 2025, 15:00	Boundary Park	C. Worsley	1,377
Widnes Vikings	10–8	Sheffield Eagles	23 February 2025, 15:00	Halton Stadium	L. O'brien	2,203
York Knights	6–7	Toulouse Olympique	23 February 2025, 15:00	York Community Stadium	S. Mikalauskas

=== Round 3 ===
Betfred Championship: round three
Home	Score	Away	Match Information
Home	Score	Away	Date and Time	Venue	Referee	Attendance
Toulouse Olympique	36–4	Bradford Bulls	8 March 2025, 18:00	Stade Ernest-Wallon	J. Vella	3,700
Barrow Raiders	20–6	Oldham	9 March 2025, 15:00	Craven Park	D. Arnold	2,222
Batley Bulldogs	28–20	Widnes Vikings	9 March 2025, 15:00	Mount Pleasant	K. Moore
Featherstone Rovers	12–19	Sheffield Eagles	9 March 2025, 15:00	Post Office Road	R. Cox
Hunslet	10–38	Doncaster	9 March 2025, 15:00	South Leeds Stadium	A. Belafonte	646
York Knights	10–18	Halifax Panthers	9 March 2025, 15:00	York Community Stadium	C. Worsley

=== Round 4 ===
Betfred Championship: round four
Home	Score	Away	Match Information
Home	Score	Away	Date and Time	Venue	Referee	Attendance
Bradford Bulls	8–18	Barrow Raiders	21 March 2025, 19:45	Odsal Stadium	R. Cox	3,085
Toulouse Olympique	50–6	Hunslet	22 March 2025, 18:00	Stade Ernest-Wallon	M. Lynn	5,390
Batley Bulldogs	10–23	York Knights	23 March 2025, 15:00	Mount Pleasant	J. Vella
Doncaster	22–26	Widnes Vikings	23 March 2025, 15:00	Eco-Power Stadium	C. Worsley	1,471
Halifax Panthers	38–12	Featherstone Rovers	23 March 2025, 15:00	The Shay	M. Griffiths	2,225
Oldham	50–6	London Broncos	23 March 2025, 15:00	Boundary Park	S. Mikalauskas	1,567

=== Round 5 ===
Betfred Championship: round five
Home	Score	Away	Match Information
Home	Score	Away	Date and Time	Venue	Referee	Attendance
London Broncos	26–6	Hunslet	29 March 2025, 17:00	Plough Lane	K. Moore
Doncaster	10–6	Toulouse Olympique	29 March 2025, 19:30	Eco-Power Stadium	A. Belafonte	1,028
Barrow Raiders	12–36	York Knights	30 March 2025, 15:00	Craven Park	S. Mikalauskas
Halifax Panthers	50–6	Batley Bulldogs	30 March 2025, 15:00	The Shay	M. Lynn	1,659
Featherstone Rovers	24–48	Bradford Bulls	30 March 2025, 15:00	Post Office Road	C. Worsley
Sheffield Eagles	8–20	Oldham	30 March 2025, 15:00	Steel City Stadium	R. Cox	992

=== Round 6 ===
Betfred Championship: round six
Home	Score	Away	Match Information
Home	Score	Away	Date and Time	Venue	Referee	Attendance
Hunslet	12–46	Halifax Panthers	11 April 2025, 19:45	South Leeds Stadium	T. Jones	1,095
London Broncos	14–16	Batley Bulldogs	12 April 2025, 17:00	Plough Lane	R. Cox
Sheffield Eagles	12–34	Toulouse Olympique	12 April 2025, 18:00	Steel City Stadium	S. Mikalauskas	911
Oldham	30–28	Featherstone Rovers	13 April 2025, 15:00	Boundary Park	C. Worsley	1,660
Widnes Vikings	12–37	Barrow Raiders	13 April 2025, 15:00	Halton Stadium	M. Griffiths	2,284
York Knights	66–0	Doncaster	13 April 2025, 15:00	York Community Stadium	M. Lynn

=== Round 7 ===
Betfred Championship: round seven
Home	Score	Away	Match Information
Home	Score	Away	Date and Time	Venue	Referee	Attendance
Barrow Raiders	24–6	London Broncos	18 April 2025, 15:00	Craven Park	T. Jones	1,754
Batley Bulldogs	24–28	Hunslet	18 April 2025, 15:00	Mount Pleasant	A. Belafonte	1,613
Doncaster	19–6	Sheffield Eagles	18 April 2025, 15:00	Eco-Power Stadium	K. Moore	1,234
Halifax Panthers	8–12	Bradford Bulls	18 April 2025, 15:00	The Shay	S. Mikalauskas	4,887
Widnes Vikings	10–10	Oldham	18 April 2025, 15:00	Halton Stadium	M. Lynn	2,561
Featherstone Rovers	24–22	York Knights	18 April 2025, 18:00	Post Office Road	R. Cox

=== Round 8 ===
Betfred Championship: round eight
Home	Score	Away	Match Information
Home	Score	Away	Date and Time	Venue	Referee	Attendance
Oldham	12–42	Bradford Bulls	25 April 2025, 19:30	Boundary Park	C. Worsley	2,694
Sheffield Eagles	50–18	Batley Bulldogs	25 April 2025, 19:45	Steel City Stadium	R. Cox	627
Featherstone Rovers	10–18	Toulouse Olympique	26 April 2025, 15:00	Post Office Road	M. Lynn
Barrow Raiders	24–19	Doncaster	27 April 2025, 15:00	Craven Park	K. Moore	1,612
Halifax Panthers	40–12	London Broncos	27 April 2025, 15:00	The Shay	D. Arnold	1,783
York Knights	26–12	Widnes Vikings	27 April 2025, 15:00	York Community Stadium	S. Mikalauskas

=== Round 9 ===
Betfred Championship: round nine
Home	Score	Away	Match Information
Home	Score	Away	Date and Time	Venue	Referee	Attendance
London Broncos	6–36	York Knights	3 May 2025, 17:00	Plough Lane	A. Belafonte
Toulouse Olympique	32–0	Halifax Panthers	3 May 2025, 18:00	Stade Ernest-Wallon	K. Moore
Batley Bulldogs	24–24	Barrow Raiders	4 May 2025, 15:00	Mount Pleasant	C. Worsley
Bradford Bulls	32–20	Sheffield Eagles	4 May 2025, 15:00	Odsal Stadium	M. Lynn	3,208
Doncaster	26–30	Oldham	4 May 2025, 15:00	Eco-Power Stadium	D. Arnold
Hunslet	14–28	Widnes Vikings	4 May 2025, 15:00	South Leeds Stadium	A. Sweet	860

=== Round 10 ===
Betfred Championship: round ten
Home	Score	Away	Match Information
Home	Score	Away	Date and Time	Venue	Referee	Attendance
Oldham	18–30	Toulouse Olympique	10 May 2025, 17:00	Boundary Park	J. Vella	1,454
Batley Bulldogs	12–48	Bradford Bulls	11 May 2025, 15:00	Mount Pleasant	K. Moore	2,304
Halifax Panthers	6–30	Doncaster	11 May 2025, 15:00	The Shay	M. Lynn	1,748
London Broncos	20–22	Sheffield Eagles	11 May 2025, 15:00	The Rock (Note: Plough Lane unavailable to London due to AFC Wimbledon being involved in the EFL play-offs)	R. Cox	850
Widnes Vikings	16–38	Featherstone Rovers	11 May 2025, 15:00	Halton Stadium	C. Worsley
York Knights	58–8	Hunslet	11 May 2025, 15:00	York Community Stadium	A. Belafonte

=== Round 11 ===
Betfred Championship: round eleven
Home	Score	Away	Match Information
Home	Score	Away	Date and Time	Venue	Referee	Attendance
Sheffield Eagles	18–22	Hunslet	23 May 2025, 19:30	Steel City Stadium	S. Mikalauskas
Toulouse Olympique	30–12	Barrow Raiders	24 May 2025, 18:00	Stade Ernest-Wallon	J. Vella	3,555
Bradford Bulls	36–20	Widnes Vikings	25 May 2025, 15:00	Odsal Stadium	K. Moore	3,311
Doncaster	30–12	London Broncos	25 May 2025, 15:00	Eco-Power Stadium	R. Cox	1,177
Featherstone Rovers	46–4	Batley Bulldogs	25 May 2025, 15:00	Post Office Road	C. Worsley
Oldham	34–10	Halifax Panthers	25 May 2025, 15:00	Boundary Park	M. Lynn	1,998

=== Round 12 ===
Betfred Championship: round twelve
Home	Score	Away	Match Information
Home	Score	Away	Date and Time	Venue	Referee	Attendance
Batley Bulldogs	14–30	Toulouse Olympique	31 May 2025, 15:00	Mount Pleasant	D. Arnold
London Broncos	10–12	Widnes Vikings	31 May 2025, 17:00	Plough Lane	A. Belafonte
Barrow Raiders	12–30	Featherstone Rovers	1 June 2025, 15:00	Craven Park	M. Lynn	1,684
Doncaster	22–30	Bradford Bulls	1 June 2025, 15:00	Eco-Power Stadium	S. Mikalauskas
Hunslet	4–54	Oldham	1 June 2025, 15:00	South Leeds Stadium	K. Moore	711
York Knights	48–8	Sheffield Eagles	1 June 2025, 15:00	York Community Stadium	C. Worsley

=== Round 13 ===
Betfred Championship: round thirteen
Home	Score	Away	Match Information
Home	Score	Away	Date and Time	Venue	Referee	Attendance
Toulouse Olympique	24–16	London Broncos	15 June 2025, 14:00	Stade Ernest-Wallon	M. Lynn	4,136
Barrow Raiders	22–28	Sheffield Eagles	15 June 2025, 15:00	Craven Park	K. Moore	1,884
Batley Bulldogs	12–50	Doncaster	15 June 2025, 15:00	Mount Pleasant	R. Cox	1,529
Bradford Bulls	18–20	York Knights	15 June 2025, 15:00	Odsal Stadium	J. Vella	3,603
Featherstone Rovers	26–24	Hunslet	15 June 2025, 15:00	Post Office Road	T. Jones	1,897
Widnes Vikings	24–24	Halifax Panthers	15 June 2025, 15:00	Halton Stadium	S. Mikalauskas	2,582

=== Round 14 ===
Betfred Championship: round fourteen
Home	Score	Away	Match Information
Home	Score	Away	Date and Time	Venue	Referee	Attendance
Bradford Bulls	32–6	Batley Bulldogs	20 June 2025, 19:45	Odsal Stadium	K. Moore	3,131
Featherstone Rovers	32–16	Halifax Panthers	20 June 2025, 20:00	Post Office Road	M. Lynn
Toulouse Olympique	34–14	Oldham	21 June 2025, 18:00	Stade Ernest-Wallon	A. Belafonte	2,873
Hunslet	0–58	Barrow Raiders	22 June 2025, 15:00	South Leeds Stadium	R. Cox	804
Sheffield Eagles	12–26	Doncaster	22 June 2025, 15:00	Steel City Stadium	T. Jones	821
Widnes Vikings	18–36	York Knights	22 June 2025, 15:00	Halton Stadium	S. Mikalauskas	2,677

=== Round 15 ===
Betfred Championship: round fifteen
Home	Score	Away	Match Information
Home	Score	Away	Date and Time	Venue	Referee	Attendance
Widnes Vikings	24–4	Toulouse Olympique	28 June 2025, 15:00	Halton Stadium	R. Cox	2,631
Barrow Raiders	24–22	Bradford Bulls	29 June 2025, 15:00	Craven Park	D. Arnold	2,456
Batley Bulldogs	24–14	Sheffield Eagles	29 June 2025, 15:00	Mount Pleasant	A. Belafonte
Halifax Panthers	20–23	Oldham	29 June 2025, 15:00	Odsal Stadium (Note: Halifax played a number of home games at Bradford's Odsal stadium due to pitch redevelopment work at the Shay.)	S. Mikalauskas	1,392
Hunslet	6–72	London Broncos	29 June 2025, 15:00	South Leeds Stadium	L. Bland	849
York Knights	30–8	Featherstone Rovers	29 June 2025, 15:00	York Community Stadium	K. Moore

=== Round 16 ===
Betfred Championship: round sixteen
Home	Score	Away	Match Information
Home	Score	Away	Date and Time	Venue	Referee	Attendance
Bradford Bulls	34–0	Hunslet	4 July 2025, 19:30	Odsal Stadium	C. Worsley	3,777
London Broncos	20–14	Halifax Panthers	5 July 2025, 15:00	Stonebridge Road, Ebbsfleet (Note: Match played at Ebbsfleet due to pitch works at Plough Lane.)	A. Belafonte
Toulouse Olympique	12–6	Doncaster	5 July 2025, 20:00	Stade Michel Bendichou, Colomiers (Note: Match moved due to works at Stade Ernest Wallon.)	K. Moore	2,762
Featherstone Rovers	48–12	Barrow Raiders	6 July 2025, 15:00	Post Office Road	S. Mikalauskas	1,680
Oldham	22–4	Widnes Vikings	6 July 2025, 15:00	Park Lane, Whitefield (Note: Match moved to Park Lane due to pitch maintenance works at Boundary Park.)	M. Lynn
Sheffield Eagles	10–36	York Knights	6 July 2025, 15:00	Steel City Stadium	R. Cox	746

=== Round 17 ===
Betfred Championship: round seventeen
Home	Score	Away	Match Information
Home	Score	Away	Date and Time	Venue	Referee	Attendance
Hunslet	4–70	Featherstone Rovers	11 July 2025, 19:30	South Leeds Stadium	A. Belafonte	1,009
London Broncos	18–38	Doncaster	12 July 2025, 17:00	Stonebridge Road, Ebbsfleet	T. Jones
Halifax Panthers	30–16	Toulouse Olympique	17 July 2025, 18:00	Odsal Stadium	K. Moore	980
Barrow Raiders	40–16	Batley Bulldogs	13 July 2025, 15:00	Craven Park	C. Worsley	1,863
Oldham	24–12	Sheffield Eagles	13 July 2025, 15:00	Boundary Park	S. Mikalauskas
York Knights	16–14	Bradford Bulls	13 July 2025, 15:00	York Community Stadium	M. Lynn

=== Round 18 ===
Betfred Championship: round eighteen
Home	Score	Away	Match Information
Home	Score	Away	Date and Time	Venue	Referee	Attendance
Bradford Bulls	28–12	Oldham	18 July 2025, 19:45	Odsal Stadium	J. Vella
Toulouse Olympique	24–22	Featherstone Rovers	19 July 2025, 18:00	Stade Ernest-Wallon	T. Jones
Batley Bulldogs	16–18	Halifax Panthers	20 July 2025, 15:00	Mount Pleasant	S. Mikalauskas
Sheffield Eagles	6–48	London Broncos	20 July 2025, 15:00	Steel City Stadium	M. Lynn
Widnes Vikings	16–20	Doncaster	20 July 2025, 15:00	Halton Stadium	C. Worsley	2,722
York Knights	26–12	Barrow Raiders	20 July 2025, 15:00	York Community Stadium	R. Cox

=== Round 19 ===
Betfred Championship: round nineteen
Home	Score	Away	Match Information
Home	Score	Away	Date and Time	Venue	Referee	Attendance
Halifax Panthers	12–19	York Knights	25 July 2025, 19:45	Odsal Stadium	M. Lynn
Barrow Raiders	14–34	Toulouse Olympique	26 July 2025, 18:00	Craven Park	M. Lynn	2,049
Doncaster	42–16	Batley Bulldogs	27 July 2025, 15:00	Eco-Power Stadium	L. Rush	2,036
Featherstone Rovers	36–18	London Broncos	27 July 2025, 15:00	Post Office Road	R. Cox
Oldham	48–16	Hunslet	27 July 2025, 15:00	Boundary Park	T. Jones	1,711
Widnes Vikings	16–28	Bradford Bulls	27 July 2025, 15:00	Halton Stadium	S. Mikalauskas	3,304

=== Round 20 ===
Betfred Championship: round twenty
Home	Score	Away	Match Information
Home	Score	Away	Date and Time	Venue	Referee	Attendance
Bradford Bulls	30–10	Halifax Panthers	1 August 2025, 19:45	Odsal Stadium	R. Cox	4,505
Batley Bulldogs	4–18	Featherstone Rovers	3 August 2025, 15:00	Mount Pleasant	M. Lynn	1,884
Doncaster	34–34	Hunslet	3 August 2025, 15:00	Eco-Power Stadium	A. Belafonte	1,237
London Broncos	18–10	Barrow Raiders	3 August 2025, 15:00	Plough Lane	M. Griffiths
Sheffield Eagles	12–24	Widnes Vikings	3 August 2025, 15:00	Steel City Stadium	K. Moore	765
York Knights	24–16	Oldham	3 August 2025, 15:00	York Community Stadium	S. Mikalauskas

=== Round 21 ===
Betfred Championship: round twenty one
Home	Score	Away	Match Information
Home	Score	Away	Date and Time	Venue	Referee	Attendance
Bradford Bulls	18–12	Doncaster	8 August 2025, 19:45	Odsal Stadium	S. Mikalauskas	3,541
London Broncos	18–24	Toulouse Olympique	10 August 2025, 13:00	Plough Lane	J. Vella
Halifax Panthers	46–6	Sheffield Eagles	10 August 2025, 15:00	Odsal Stadium	T. Jones	1,273
Hunslet	0–56	York Knights	10 August 2025, 15:00	South Leeds Stadium	M. Lynn	1,008
Oldham	44–30	Barrow Raiders	10 August 2025, 15:00	Boundary Park	R. Cox	1,998
Widnes Vikings	30–10	Batley Bulldogs	10 August 2025, 15:00	Halton Stadium	M. Griffiths	2,632

=== Round 22 ===
Betfred Championship: round twenty two
Home	Score	Away	Match Information
Home	Score	Away	Date and Time	Venue	Referee	Attendance
Toulouse Olympique	58–6	Sheffield Eagles	16 August 2025, 18:00	Stade Ernest-Wallon	R. Cox	2,076
Barrow Raiders	14–20	Widnes Vikings	17 August 2025, 15:00	Craven Park	L. Rush	2,120
Batley Bulldogs	18–22	Oldham	17 August 2025, 15:00	Mount Pleasant	M. Lynn	2,480
Doncaster	30–42	Featherstone Rovers	17 August 2025, 15:00	Eco-Power Stadium	J. Vella
Halifax Panthers	48–10	Hunslet	17 August 2025, 15:00	Odsal Stadium	S. Mikalauskas	1,288
York Knights	42–16	London Broncos	17 August 2025, 15:00	York Community Stadium	K. Moore

=== Round 23 ===
Betfred Championship: round twenty three
Home	Score	Away	Match Information
Home	Score	Away	Date and Time	Venue	Referee	Attendance
Toulouse Olympique	8–16	York Knights	22 August 2025, 18:30	Stade Ernest-Wallon	J. Vella	2,853
Sheffield Eagles	8–70	Bradford Bulls	22 August 2025, 19:30	Steel City Stadium	R. Cox	1,344
Featherstone Rovers	14–30	Widnes Vikings	23 August 2025, 18:00	Post Office Road	M. Lynn
Doncaster	22–32	Barrow Raiders	24 August 2025, 15:00	Eco-Power Stadium	S. Mikalauskas	1,432
Hunslet	6–40	Batley Bulldogs	24 August 2025, 15:00	South Leeds Stadium	K. Moore	855
London Broncos	18–20	Oldham	24 August 2025, 15:00	Plough Lane	T. Jones

=== Round 24 ===
Betfred Championship: round twenty four
Home	Score	Away	Match Information
Home	Score	Away	Date and Time	Venue	Referee	Attendance
Batley Bulldogs	16–30	London Broncos	30 August 2025, 15:00	Mount Pleasant	A. Belafonte	1,160
Bradford Bulls	10–12	Toulouse Olympique	30 August 2025, 18:00	Odsal Stadium	L. Rush	4,792
Barrow Raiders	10–48	Halifax Panthers	31 August 2025, 15:00	Craven Park	M. Lynn
Oldham	13–12	Doncaster	31 August 2025, 15:00	Boundary Park	J. Vella	2,334
Sheffield Eagles	10–30	Featherstone Rovers	31 August 2025, 15:00	Steel City Stadium	T. Jones	901
Widnes Vikings	40–12	Hunslet	31 August 2025, 15:00	Halton Stadium	R. Cox	3,025

=== Round 25 ===
Betfred Championship: round twenty five
Home	Score	Away	Match Information
Home	Score	Away	Date and Time	Venue	Referee	Attendance
London Broncos	24–34	Bradford Bulls	6 September 2025, 16:00	Plough Lane	M. Griffiths
Toulouse Olympique	46–22	Batley Bulldogs	6 September 2025, 18:00	Stade Ernest-Wallon	G. Poumes	3,739
Doncaster	0–56	York Knights	7 September 2025, 15:00	Eco-Power Stadium	T. Jones	1,878
Featherstone Rovers	28–12	Oldham	7 September 2025, 15:00	Post Office Road	L. Rush
Halifax Panthers	16–14	Widnes Vikings	7 September 2025, 15:05	The Shay	J. Vella	2,661
Hunslet	6–46	Sheffield Eagles	7 September 2025, 15:05	South Leeds Stadium	S. Mikalauskas

=== Round 26 ===
Betfred Championship: round twenty six
Home	Score	Away	Match Information
Home	Score	Away	Date and Time	Venue	Referee	Attendance
Hunslet	6–68	Toulouse Olympique	13 September 2025, 18:00	South Leeds Stadium	A. Belafonte	641
Bradford Bulls	22–8	Featherstone Rovers	14 September 2025, 15:00	Odsal Stadium	J. Vella	3,684
Doncaster	16–24	Halifax Panthers	14 September 2025, 15:00	Eco-Power Stadium	L. Rush
Sheffield Eagles	26–12	Barrow Raiders	14 September 2025, 15:00	Steel City Stadium	M. Lynn	777
Widnes Vikings	10–20	London Broncos	14 September 2025, 15:00	Halton Stadium	T. Jones	2,529
York Knights	52–12	Batley Bulldogs	14 September 2025, 15:00	York Community Stadium	R. Cox

== Play-offs ==
The format follows previous years with the teams finishing third to sixth in the regular season meeting in the eliminators with the winners of those two matches progressing to the semi-finals. The teams that finish first and second in the regular season have byes to the semi-finals and also have home advantage. York Knights, having finished first, play whichever team is the lowest ranked winner of the eliminators while the other semi-final sees the second placed team playing the highest ranked winner of the eliminators.

=== Team bracket ===
Eliminators
4	Oldham	4
5	Halifax Panthers	40
3	Bradford Bulls	28
6	Featherstone Rovers	8

Semi-finals
1	York Knights	30
5	Halifax Panthers	18
2	Toulouse Olympique	24
3	Bradford Bulls	20

Grand Final
1	York Knights	8
2	Toulouse Olympique	10

=== Week 1: Eliminators ===
19 September
19:45

Bradford Bulls	28–8	Featherstone Rovers
Tries: Okunbor (2), Taufua (2), Scurr; Goals: Lilley (1), Hooley (3)		Tries: Aekins; Goals: Addy (2)

Odsal Stadium
Referee: S. Mikalauskas

19 September
20:00

Oldham	4–40	Halifax Panthers
Tries: Ryan		Tries: C. Graham (2), Douglas, Crooks, Nofoaluma, Woodburn-Hall, Fairbank; Goals: Whitby (6)

Boundary Park
Attendance: 2,667
Referee: M. Lynn

=== Week 2: Semi-finals ===
27 September
18:00

York Knights	30–18	Halifax Panthers
Tries: Jones-Bishop, Galeano, Buchanan, Mata'afa (2); Goals: Harris (5/7)		Tries: Johnson, Crooks, Douglas; Goals: Whitby (3/3)

York Community Stadium
Referee: T. Grant

28 September
16:00

Toulouse Olympique	24–20	Bradford Bulls
Tries: Ashall-Bott (2), Rennie, Ulberg; Goals: Shorrocks (4/4)		Tries: Blake, Gee, Okunbor (2); Goals: Hooley (2/4)

Stade Ernest-Wallon
Attendance: 3,245
Referee: A. Moore

=== Week 3: Championship Grand Final ===
5 October
14:00

York Knights	8–10	Toulouse Olympique
Tries: Mataafa, Buchanan; Goals: Harris (0/2)		Goals: Shorrocks (5/5)

York Community Stadium
Referee: T. Grant

Team details
York Knights		Position	Toulouse Olympique
Name	Number	Position	Number	Name
Toa Mata’afa	36	FB	1	Olly Ashall-Bott
Ben Jones-Bishop	34	WG	5	Paul Marcon
Kieran Buchanan	3	CE	26	Romeo Tropis
Oli Field	20	CE	3	Reubenn Rennie
Scott Galeano	35	WG	2	Paul Ulberg
Ata Hingano	6	SO	25	Thomas Lacans
Liam Harris	7	SH	7	Jake Shorrocks
Jack Martin	8	PR	8	Lambert Belmas
Paul McShane	9	HK	35	Brendan Hands
Bailey Antrobus	25	PF	17	Rob Butler
Jesse Dee	11	SR	4	Mathieu Jussaume
Connor Bailey	12	SR	11	Maxime Stefani
Jordan Thompson	13	LF	13	Anthony Marion
Brenden Santi	10	IN	10	James Roumanos
Sam Cook	20	IN	15	Joe Cator
Kieran Hudson	31	IN	16	Joe Bretherton
Mitch Clark	33	IN	28	AJ Wallace
Mark Applegarth		Coach		Sylvain Houles
