= 1998 RFL Division Two =

RFL Division Two
- League: Rugby Football League Division Two
- Duration: 20 Rounds
- Teams: 8

1998 Season
- Champions: Lancashire Lynx

The 1998 Division Two Championship season was the third tier of British rugby league during the 1998 season.

== Championship ==
The league was won by Lancashire Lynx. No teams were promoted, as the First and Second Divisions were merged to form a single division which would later become known as the Northern Ford Premiership.

=== League table ===
	Team	Pld	W	D	L	PF	PA	Pts
1	Lancashire Lynx	20	13	2	5	561	339	28
2	York Wasps	20	14	0	6	476	280	28
3	Batley Bulldogs	20	13	0	7	437	354	26
4	Bramley	20	12	1	7	487	386	25
5	Oldham	20	10	1	9	399	383	21
6	Barrow Border Braves	20	8	2	10	354	377	18
7	Workington Town	20	3	2	15	293	558	8
8	Doncaster Dragons	20	2	2	16	289	619	6

Champions

== See also ==
- Super League war
- 1998 Challenge Cup
