= Martin Pearson =

Wales international rugby league footballer

Personal information
- Full name: Martin Vickers-Pearson
- Born: 24 October 1971 (age 53)

Playing information

Rugby league
- Position: Fullback, Centre, Stand-off, Scrum-half
Club
| Years | Team | Pld | T | G | FG | P |
|---|---|---|---|---|---|---|
| 1989–96 | Featherstone Rovers | 166 | 101 | 464 | 6 | 1338 |
| 1997–98 | Halifax | 54 | 14 | 132 | 0 | 320 |
| 1999 | Sheffield Eagles | 25 | 9 | 36 | 2 | 110 |
| 2000 | Halifax | 21 | 11 | 69 | 0 | 182 |
| 2001 | Wakefield Trinity Wildcats | 25 | 4 | 71 | 3 | 161 |
| | Total | 291 | 139 | 772 | 11 | 2111 |
Representative
| Years | Team | Pld | T | G | FG | P |
| 1998–01 | Wales | 4 | 2 | 2 | 0 | 12 |

Rugby union
Club
| Years | Team | Pld | T | G | FG | P |
|---|---|---|---|---|---|---|
| 2001–03 | Pau |
| 2005–06 | Toulon |
| | Total | 0 | 0 | 0 | 0 | 0 |

Martin Pearson (born 24 October 1971) is a former professional rugby league and rugby union footballer who played in the 1990s and 2000s. He played representative level rugby league (RL) for Wales, and at club level for Featherstone Rovers, Halifax (two spells), the Sheffield Eagles and the Wakefield Trinity Wildcats, as a goal-kicking fullback, centre, stand-off, or scrum-half, and club level rugby union in France for Pau and Toulon.

== Playing career ==
=== International honours ===
Pearson won four caps for Wales between 1998 and 2001, scoring two tries and two goals.

=== Division Two Premiership Final appearances ===
Martin Pearson played fullback and scored four conversions in Featherstone Rovers' 20-16 victory over Workington Town in the 1992–93 Division Two Premiership Final at Old Trafford, Manchester on Wednesday 19 May 1993.

=== Career Records ===
Martin Pearson holds Featherstone Rovers' 'The Most Points In A Season' record, with 391-points scored in the 1992–93 season.
