= Martyn Ridyard =

English rugby league footballer

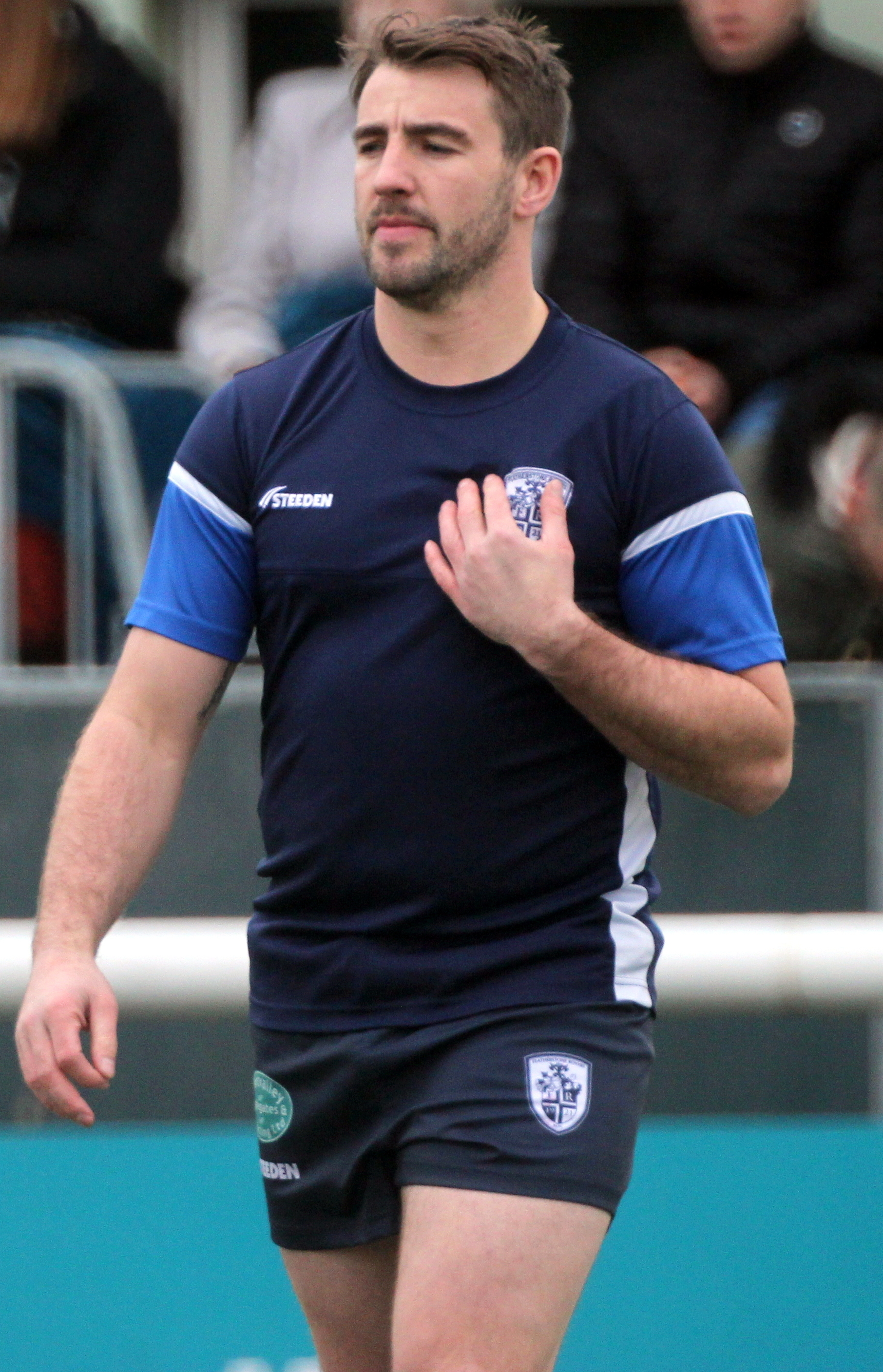

Personal information
- Born: 25 July 1986 (age 39) Salford, Greater Manchester, England
- Height: 5 ft 10 in (1.78 m)
- Weight: 13 st 12 lb (88 kg)

Playing information
- Position: Stand-off, Scrum-half
Club
Years	Team	Pld	T	G	FG	P
2009–17	Leigh Centurions	222	77	740	9	1797
2017(loan)	→ Huddersfield Giants	7	1	26	0	56
2018	Featherstone Rovers	20	8	59	0	150
2019–20	Leigh Centurions	28	3	98	3	211
2020(loan)	→ Rochdale Hornets	1	0	0	1	1
2021	Swinton Lions	23	3	59	1	131
2022–23	Oldham RLFC	39	3	165	2	344
2024–25	Rochdale Hornets	21	1	91	2	188
	Total	361	96	1238	18	2878
- Source: As of 15 November 2025

Martyn Ridyard (born 25 July 1986) is an English professional rugby league footballer who last played as a goal-kicking stand-off or scrum-half for Rochdale Hornets in the RFL League 1.

He played for the Leigh Centurions in two separate spells in the Championship and the Super League, and on loan from Leigh at the Huddersfield Giants in the Super League and the Rochdale Hornets in the Championship. Ridyard has also played for Featherstone Rovers in the second tier.

== Background ==
Ridyard was born in Salford, Greater Manchester, England.

== Career ==
=== Early career ===
Ridyard came through the junior ranks at Leigh Miners, joining Leigh academy squad upon leaving school before returning to Leigh Miners. There he helped Miners win the 2004-2005 National Conference Championship and the 2005-2006 BARLA National Cup Final, continuing to play at that level before accepting an offer from Warrington to play in their Senior Academy during 2007.

Ridyard returned once more to Leigh Miners Rangers and helped them win the 2008 League Leaders Trophy, scoring 231 points along the way, only for Miners to lose in the 2008 National Conference League Grand Final, though his season ended on a personal high by winning the highly coveted Player of the Season award.

=== Leigh Centurions ===
After a couple of false starts, Ridyard's professional career finally took off in 2009 when he re-joined hometown club Leigh Centurions, and quickly established himself as a first team regular.

A highly decorated player at amateur level, Ridyard has been capped by the BARLA Young Lions and GB Community Lions and has also represented Lancashire, before winning the first honour of his professional career when Leigh won the 2011 Northern Rail Cup Final. His second honour was being MOM in the 2013 Northern Rail Cup final win 2014 Leigh Centurions won the Kingston Press championship at Headingley, Martyn winning the Tom Bergin Trophy as MOM and also was voted Kingstone press player of the year.

=== Featherstone Rovers ===
In October 2017 he signed a two-year deal to play for Featherstone.

=== Leigh Centurions (return) ===
He returned to his home town club Leigh Centurions in 2018 for the 2019 season, although he spent most of 2020 out on loan at the Rochdale Hornets.

=== Swinton Lions ===
On 7 September 2020 it was announced that Ridyard would join the Swinton Lions for the 2021 season.

=== Oldham R.L.F.C. ===
On 22 Oct 2021 it was reported that he had signed for Oldham R.L.F.C. in the RFL League 1.

=== Rochdale Hornets ===
On 17 Nov 2023 it was reported that he had signed for Rochdale Hornets in the RFL League 1. He retired at the end of the 2025 season.
