= RFL League One Promotion Play-off Final =

Rugby league promotion play-offs

League 1 Play-off Final
- Sport: Rugby league
- Instituted: 2003
- Ceased: 2024
- Number of teams: 2
- Holders: Hunslet (2nd title) (2024)
- Most titles: Keighley Cougars; Doncaster (3 titles)

The League One play-off final was a series of play-off games that determined the one or both of teams who were promoted to the Championship. The play-offs included different number of teams between 2009 and 2024. The League One play-offs did not take place for the 2025 season, following the confirmation by the Rugby Football League in August 2025 that League One and the Championship would merge in the 2026 season.

== History ==
=== 2003: Institution ===
A Third Division was reintroduced in 2003 and was branded as National League Two. It was decided a play-off system would be introduced in both National Leagues One and Two to decide who would be promoted from their respective leagues. A six team play-off was implemented in both divisions.

=== 2004–2005: Promotion/relegation play-off ===
In 2004 promotion and relegation between both National Leagues was restructured. Now the team finishing top of the National League Two would be automatically promoted while teams finishing between 2nd and 6th competed in a five team play-off where the team reaching the final would play the team that finished second from bottom in National League One.

=== 2006–2013: One up and five team play-off ===
After just two years the promotion/ relegation play-off was scrapped in favour of a more traditional play-off. Under the new system the team finishing first would still be promoted and a six team play-off would be competed by teams finishing 2nd to 7th.

This system was not used in 2012 due to a league restructure, where the top 4 teams were promoted but competed in the Champions Play-off. The teams finishing 5th and 6th also competed in the play-off but were not guaranteed promotion.

=== 2014: Grand Final ===
Due to another league restructure taking place for the 2015 season, the make up of the play-offs was changed again for one season. A top 5 play-off would be used team winning the Grand Final being promoted.

=== 2015–2016: Promotion and play-off finals ===
Two new play-off systems were implemented in 2015, the Promotion Final and League 1 Play-offs. The top two teams would play in the Promotion Final with the winner being promoted. The loser would then join 3rd, 4th and 5th in the play-offs with the winner being promoted.

=== 2017–2018: Four team play-off ===
Halfway through the 2017 season, it was announced that the Promotion Final would be scrapped in favour of the top team being automatically promoted while 2nd to 5th would play-off for the final promotion spot. The same system was used in 2018 bit the loser of the Play-off Final would have a second chance at promotion by playing 12th in the Championship due to a league restructure.

=== 2019–2024: Return to one up and five team play-off ===
At an EGM in 2018 the League 1 clubs voted in another restructure of the play-offs and promotion spots. From 2019 onwards they would use the same system used between 2006 and 2013 by having first being promoted automatically and 2nd to 6th competing in a five team play-off.

== Results ==
Year	Winners	Score	Runners up	Stadium	Attendance
2003	Keighley	13–11	Sheffield	Halton Stadium	9,186
2004	Halifax	34–30	York	Halton Stadium	
2005	Batley	28–26	Dewsbury	Halton Stadium	
2006	Sheffield	35–10	Swinton	Halliwell Jones Stadium	
2007	Featherstone	24–6	Oldham	Headingley	
2008	Doncaster	20–10	Oldham	Halton Stadium	
2009	Keighley	28–26	Oldham	Halliwell Jones Stadium	11,398
2010	York	25–4	Oldham	Halliwell Jones Stadium	
2011	Keighley	32–12	Workington	Halliwell Jones Stadium	
2012	Doncaster	16–13	Barrow	Halliwell Jones Stadium	6,409
2013	Rochdale	32–18	Oldham	Leigh Sports Village	6,800
2014	Hunslet	17–16	Oldham	Headingley	9,167
2015	Swinton	29–28	Keighley	Halton Stadium	4,179
2016	Toulouse	32–22	Barrow	Stade Ernest-Argeles	
2017	Barrow	10–6	Whitehaven	Craven Park	3,128
2018	Bradford	27–8	Workington	Odsal	6,011
2019	Oldham	18–14	Newcastle	Whitebank	1,203
2021	Workington	36–12	Doncaster	Derwent Park	2,997
2022	Swinton	16–10	Doncaster	Heywood Road	1,086
2023	Doncaster	18–6	North Wales Crusaders	Eco-Power Stadium	2,549
2024	Hunslet	22–20	Swinton Lions	Heywood Road	885

=== Winners ===
	Club	Wins	Winning years
1=	Keighley Cougars	3	2003, 2009, 2011
1=	Doncaster	3	2008, 2012, 2023
3	Hunslet	2	2014, 2024
4	Halifax	1	2004
5	Batley Bulldogs	1	2005
6	Sheffield Eagles	1	2006
7	Featherstone Rovers	1	2007
8	York City Knights	1	2010
9	Rochdale Hornets	1	2013
10	Swinton Lions	1	2015, 2022
11	Toulouse Olympique	1	2016
12	Barrow Raiders	1	2017
13	Bradford Bulls	1	2018
14	Workington	1	2021

== See also ==
- Championship Grand Final
- Million Pound Game
