= Myles-Dalton Harrop =

English rugby league footballer (born 1998)

Myles Harrop
Personal information
- Full name: Myles-Dalton Harrop
- Born: 21 October 1998 (age 27)

Playing information
- Position: Wing, Centre
Club
Years	Team	Pld	T	G	FG	P
2022	Salford Red Devils	1	1	0	0	4
2023	Swinton Lions	2	1	0	0	4
2024–25	Rochdale Hornets	34	16	0	0	64
2026–	Hunslet	4	1	0	0	4
	Total	41	19	0	0	76
- Source: As of 18 February 2026

Myles-Dalton Harrop is a professional rugby league footballer who plays as a centre for Hunslet in the RFL Championship.

== Playing career ==
=== Salford Red Devils ===
In September 2022, Harrop scored on his Super League debut for the Salford Red Devils against the Warrington Wolves.

=== Swinton Lions ===
In December 2022, it was announced that Harrop had joined the Swinton Lions in the Championship. In January, Harrop scored a try in the pre-season victory over the Midlands Hurricanes, before suffering an injury in a pre-season friendly at St Helens that caused him to miss the majority of the season.

=== Rochdale Hornets ===
In October 2023, Harrop was released by Swinton and he signed for the Rochdale Hornets for the 2024 season.

=== Hunslet RLFC ===
On 8 November 2025 it was reported that he had signed for Hunslet in the RFL Championship on a 2-year deal.
