= Paul Southern =

Ireland international rugby league footballer

Personal information
- Born: 18 March 1976 (age 49)

Playing information
- Position: Prop
Club
Years	Team	Pld	T	G	FG	P
1997–02	Salford	122	7	15	0	58
2002(loan)	→ St Helens	2	0	0	0	0
2003	Rochdale Hornets	29	6	0	0	24
2004	Oldham	22	1	0	0	4
2005	Swinton	18	2	0	0	8
2007–08	Halifax	54	6	0	0	24
2009–10	Swinton	15	2	0	0	8
	Total	262	24	15	0	126
Representative
Years	Team	Pld	T	G	FG	P
1999–04	Ireland	8	0	0	0	0

Paul Southern (born 18 March 1976) is a former professional rugby league footballer who played in the 1990s, 2000s and 2010s for St Helens, Salford, Rochdale Hornets, Oldham, Swinton Lions and Halifax.

Southern was an Ireland international and played at the 2000 Rugby League World Cup.
