= Steve Collins (rugby league) =

Australian rugby league footballer

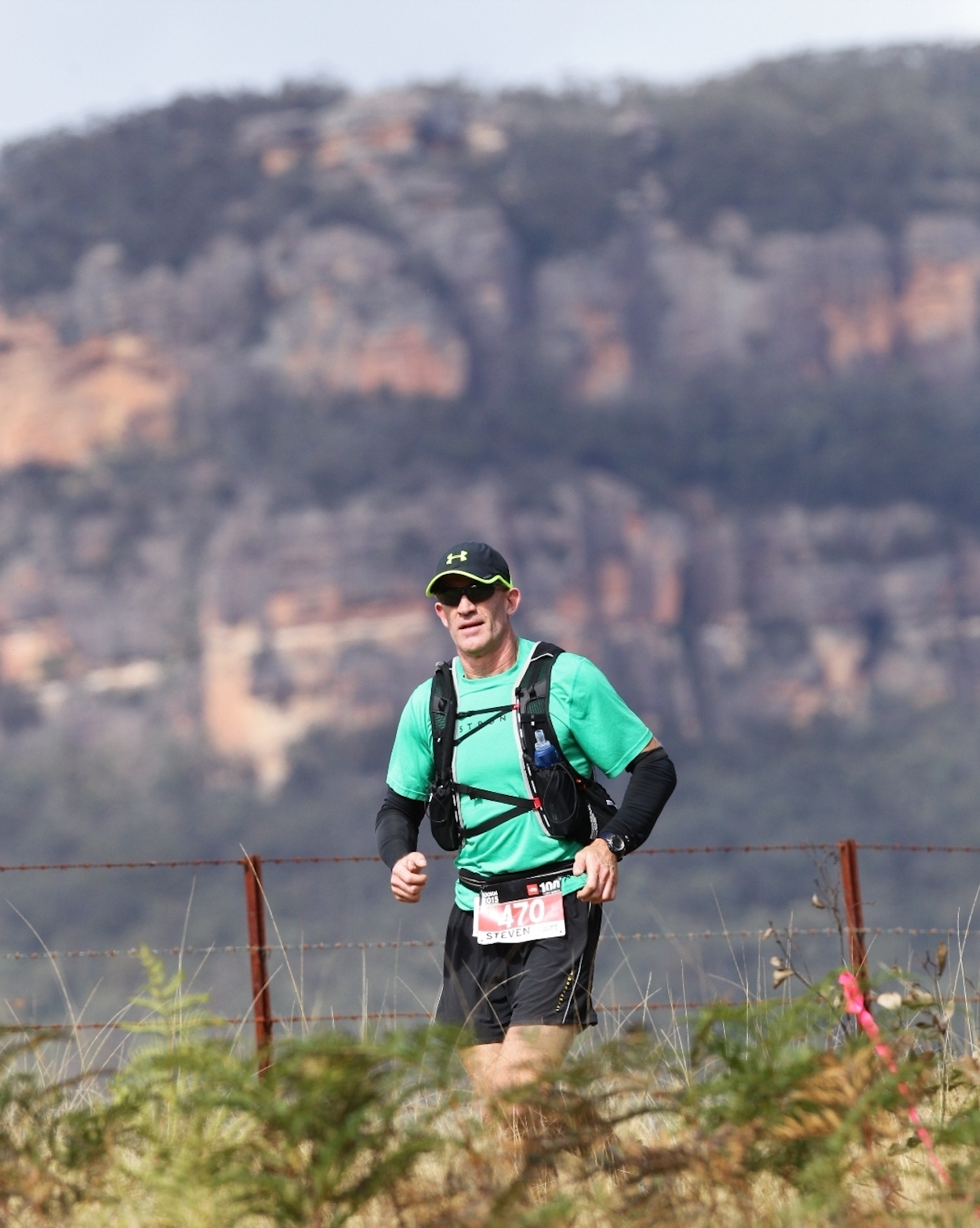
- Here, Steve Collins is pictured participating in the 2021 UTA 100km ultra-marathon.

Personal information
- Full name: Steven Douglas Collins
- Born: 9 April 1974 (age 50)

Playing information
- Position: Fullback, Wing, Centre
Club
Years	Team	Pld	T	G	FG	P
1996	Canberra Raiders	11	4	0	0	16
1997	Parramatta Eels	17	7	0	0	28
1998	Featherstone Rovers	32	22	0	0	88
1999	Gateshead Thunder	24	13	0	0	52
2000	Hull FC	32	18	0	0	72
	Total	116	64	0	0	256

Steve Collins (born 9 April 1974) is an Australian former professional rugby league footballer who played in the 1990s and 2000s. He played at club level for Canberra Raiders, Parramatta Eels, Featherstone Rovers, Gateshead Thunder and Hull FC during 2000s Super League V, as a fullback, wing, or centre.

== Playing career ==
=== First Division Grand Final appearances ===
Collins played fullback, and scored a try in Featherstone Rovers' 22–24 defeat by Wakefield Trinity in the 1998 First Division Grand Final at McAlpine Stadium, Huddersfield on 26 September 1998.

=== Club career ===
Collins was transferred from Parramatta Eels to Featherstone Rovers, signed by Steve Simms, Steve Collins made his début for Featherstone Rovers on Sunday 1 February 1998, and he played his last match for Featherstone Rovers during the 1998 season.
