= Darren Rogers (rugby league) =

England international rugby league footballer

Personal information
- Full name: Darren Rogers
- Born: 6 May 1974 (age 52) Wakefield, West Yorkshire, England

Playing information
- Position: Wing, Centre, Fullback
Club
| Years | Team | Pld | T | G | FG | P |
|---|---|---|---|---|---|---|
| 1992–95 | Dewsbury | 61 | 35 | 0 | 0 | 140 |
| 1995–98 | Salford City Reds | 94 | 50 | 0 | 0 | 200 |
| 1999–04 | Castleford Tigers | 178 | 89 | 0 | 0 | 356 |
| 2005–06 | Dewsbury Rams | 50 | 28 | 0 | 0 | 112 |
| | Total | 383 | 202 | 0 | 0 | 808 |
Representative
| Years | Team | Pld | T | G | FG | P |
| 1999–00 | England | 5 | 2 | 0 | 0 | 8 |

Darren Rogers (born 6 May 1974) is an English former professional rugby league footballer who played in the 1990s and 2000s. He played at representative level for England, and at club level for Dewsbury Rams (two spells), Salford City Reds and the Castleford Tigers, as a fullback, wing or centre. Rogers also coached Huddersfield Blue Ghosts 2015 Varsity winning side. Darren was a regular try scorer for Castleford but left the club when they got relegated in 2004. He went on to play 2 seasons for Dewsbury Rams.

== Background ==
Rogers was born on 6 May 1974 in Wakefield, West Yorkshire, England. He played junior rugby league at Stanley Rangers before being signed by Dewsbury in May 1991.

== Playing career ==
=== Club career ===
Rogers previously held the Castleford 'Most Tries In A Season' record, with 23-tries scored in 1999. Darren Rogers scored 206 tries in his career.

=== International honours ===
Rogers won two caps for England in 1999, both against France. He was called up as an injury replacement during the 2000 Rugby League World Cup, and went on to play three games during the tournament (against Russia, Fiji, and Ireland).
