= Cliff Eccles =

Ireland international rugby league footballer

Personal information
- Full name: Clifford Eccles
- Born: 4 September 1967 (age 58) Warrington, Cheshire, England

Playing information
- Position: Prop, Second-row
Club
Years	Team	Pld	T	G	FG	P
1987–91	Springfield Borough/Chorley Borough
1991–94	Rochdale Hornets
1994–98	Salford City Reds	124	13	0	0	52
1999	Swinton Lions	25	4	0	0	16
2000	Widnes Vikings	14	6	0	0	24
	Total	163	23	0	0	92
Representative
Years	Team	Pld	T	G	FG	P
1997–98	Ireland	3	0	0	0	0
- Relatives: Bob Eccles (brother)

Clifford Eccles (born 4 September 1967 in Warrington) is a professional rugby league footballer who played in the 1980s, 1990s and 2000s. He played at representative level for Ireland, and at club level for Springfield Borough/Chorley Borough, Rochdale Hornets, Salford City Reds, Swinton Lions and Widnes Vikings, as a prop, or second-row.

== Playing career ==
Eccles started his professional rugby league career with Springfield Borough, signing from amateur club Leigh Miners in 1987. He usually played as a second-row forward during the early years of his career, but made a successful switch to prop forward during the 1989–90 season.

Eccles spent the 1991–92 season on loan at Rochdale Hornets, playing for the club in the 1991–92 Lancashire Cup final defeat against St Helens. He joined the club on a permanent basis for the following season.

Eccles was signed to Salford at the start of the 1994 season from Rochdale Hornets by the then head coach Garry Jack. He went on to play a key role in the side that achieved Grand Final Success at Old Trafford in 1996, and was awarded the Tom Bergin Trophy for his man of the match performance. He went on to play in the Super League under the guidance of former Wigan player Andy Gregory.

Gregory's team made three Challenge Cup semi-final appearances but never quite stepped up to reach the Wembley Final, the most memorable being at Headingley Stadium against the Sheffield Eagles, with minutes to go Salford were in charge of the game, Gregory decided to replace Cliff Eccles and Andy Platt in the front row, this proved to be his tactical downfall as the Sheffield Eagles went on to score tries in the very gaps that the two strong front rowers had left in the defensive line.

Eccles held the record at the Salford Reds for most consecutive appearances by a forward at 103 without missing a game over four seasons including Super League and Challenge Cup Games.

Cliff left the Salford Reds before the start of the 1999 season to join former Salford player turned coach Mike Gregory in his first head coaching role at Swinton Lions.

Eccles stayed with Gregory at Swinton for one season and then joined the Widnes Vikings with Colin Whitfield as head coach; after one season Eccles retired from the game with damaged knee ligaments.

== International honours ==
Cliff Eccles won caps for Ireland while at the Salford City Reds 1997–1998 1-cap + 2-caps (sub).

== Personal life ==
Cliff Eccles is the younger brother of the former Great Britain rugby league international, Bob Eccles.
