= Brad Davis (rugby, born 1968) =

Australian rugby league footballer & dual-code rugby coach

- Born: 13 March 1968 (age 58) Australia

Rugby union career
Coaching career
- Years: Team
- 2006–2013: Bath (Defence and skills coach)
- 2013–2016: Wasps (Defence coach)
- 2016–2019: Ospreys (Defence coach)
- 2019–2023: London Irish (Assistant coach)
- 2023: Australia (Attack Coach)
- 2024–: Queensland Reds (Assistant coach)
- Rugby league career

Playing information
- Position: Stand-off, Scrum-half, Hooker
Club
Years	Team	Pld	T	G	FG	P
1992–93	Nottingham City
1993–94	Huddersfield
1994–95	York Wasps	37	24	2	1	101
1995–97	Wakefield Trinity	48	29	128	8	376
1997–00	Castleford Tigers	96	37	57	9	177
2001–03	Wakefield Trinity Wildcats	70	16	23	5	115
2003	Villeneuve
2004–06	Castleford Tigers	45	17	9	1	87
	Total	296	123	219	24	856

Coaching information
Club
Years	Team	Gms	W	D	L	W%
2003–04	Villeneuve

Brad Davis (born 13 March 1968) is an Australian former professional rugby league footballer who played in the 1990s and 2000s. He is a rugby league and current rugby union coach.

He played club rugby league for Nottingham City, Huddersfield, the York Wasps, Wakefield Trinity Wildcats (two spells) (captain), Castleford Tigers (two spells), and the Villeneuve Leopards, as a stand-off, scrum-half, or hooker. He coached rugby league for the Villeneuve Leopards and was assistant coach of Castleford Tigers.

Davis coached club level rugby union for Bath (defence and skills coach), Wasps (defence coach), Ospreys (defence coach), and London Irish.

Davis is a Tigers Hall of Fame Inductee.
