= Steve Blakeley =

England international rugby league footballer

Personal information
- Full name: Steve Blakeley
- Born: 17 October 1972 (age 53) Leigh, England

Playing information
- Position: Stand-off, Scrum-half
Club
Years	Team	Pld	T	G	FG	P
1991–92	Wigan	8	3	3	0	18
1992–99	Salford	176	62	573	8	1402
2000	Warrington	10	1	9	0	22
2000–03	Salford	87	15	207	1	475
	Total	281	81	792	9	1917
Representative
Years	Team	Pld	T	G	FG	P
1996–99	England	3	1	0	0	4

Steve Blakeley (born 17 October 1972) is an English former professional rugby league footballer who played in the 1990s and 2000s. He played at representative level for England, and at club level for Wigan, Salford (two spells), and Warrington Wolves, as a stand-off, or scrum-half.

== Career ==
=== Wigan ===
Blakeley started his career at Wigan where he made eight appearances as an interchange/substitute. He made his début for Wigan against Featherstone Rovers in the 1990–91 Rugby League Premiership first-round match during the 1990–91 season at Central Park, Wigan on Sunday 21 April 1991, scoring his first try for Wigan in a 26–31 defeat. He scored his last try for Wigan in the 31-14 victory over Dewsbury in the 1991–92 Regal Trophy preliminary-round during the 1991–92 season at Central Park, Wigan on Tuesday 29 October 1991, and he played his last match for Wigan in the 36-16 victory over Leigh during the 1992–93 season at Hilton Park, Leigh on Sunday 4 October 1992.

=== Salford ===
In 1992, he was transferred from Wigan to Salford for £28,000. He was transferred from the Salford City Reds to the Warrington Wolves at the end of 1999's Super League IV. He made his début for Warrington Wolves on Sunday 13 February 2000, and he played his last match for Warrington Wolves on Monday 1 May 2000. He played 10 games for the Warrington Wolves, but returned to Salford City Reds in May 2000 after becoming frustrated at his lack of playing time. He then remained with Salford City Reds until his retirement in 2003. He holds Salford's "Most goals in a game" record with 14-goals scored against Gateshead Thunder on Sunday 23 March 2003. He is also Salford's third highest point scorer behind David Watkins and Gus Risman.

=== International honours ===
Blakeley won caps for England while at Salford Reds in 1996 against France, and Wales (interchange/substitute), and while at Salford City Reds in 1999 against France (interchange/substitute).

== Physiotherapist ==
After retiring from playing he served a number of clubs as a physiotherapist including Wigan Warriors, Huddersfield Giants and football teams Manchester City and Bolton Wanderers.
