= Rugby Football League Championship Third Division =

Founded in England in 1991

RFL Championship Third Division
- Sport: Rugby league
- Instituted: 1991-1993 (as Third Division); 1995-1998 (as Division Two)
- Ceased: 1998
- Replaced by: League 1
- Country: England
- Most titles: Hull Kingston Rovers (2 titles)
- Related competition: Challenge Cup
- Promotion to: Second Division

The Rugby Football League Championship Third Division was founded in 1991 and was the third tier of professional rugby league in the UK until 1998.

== History ==
The RFL Championship Third Division was founded in 1991 to make the top two divisions more competitive. The competition ran for two seasons until it was scrapped in 1993. The third division was resurrected in 1995 and ran for another three seasons although there was no promotion in 1995–96. In 1999 the Second and Third Divisions were merged to create the Northern Ford Premiership, the third division was recreated again in 2003.

In 2003 rugby league beneath Super League were completely re-organised into the Rugby League National Leagues. The Third Division was renamed National League Two.

== Results ==
Year	Champions	Promoted	Bottom	Ref
1991–92	Huddersfield	Huddersfield; Bramley	Nottingham City	
1992–93	Keighley	Second and Third Division merged	Nottingham City	
1993–1995: No Third Division
1995–96	Hull Kingston Rovers	No Promotion	Highfield	
1996	Hull Kingston Rovers	Hull Kingston Rovers; Swinton	Prescot Panthers	
1997	Hunslet	Hunslet; Rochdale; Leigh	Prescot Panthers	
1998	Lancashire Lynx	Division One and Two merged	Doncaster	
1999-2002: No Third Division

- In 1993, Chorley Borough, Blackpool Gladiators and Nottingham City were relegated to the National Conference League.

=== Winners ===
	Club	Wins	Winning years
1	Hunslet	1	1997
2	Keighley Cougars	1	1992–93
3	Hull Kingston Rovers	2	1995–96, 1996
6	Huddersfield Giants	1	1991–92
5	Lancashire Lynx §	1	1998

- § Denotes club now defunct

== See also ==
- Rugby Football League Championship
- Rugby Football League Championship Second Division
