= Barry Eaton =

English RL coach and former Wales international rugby league footballer

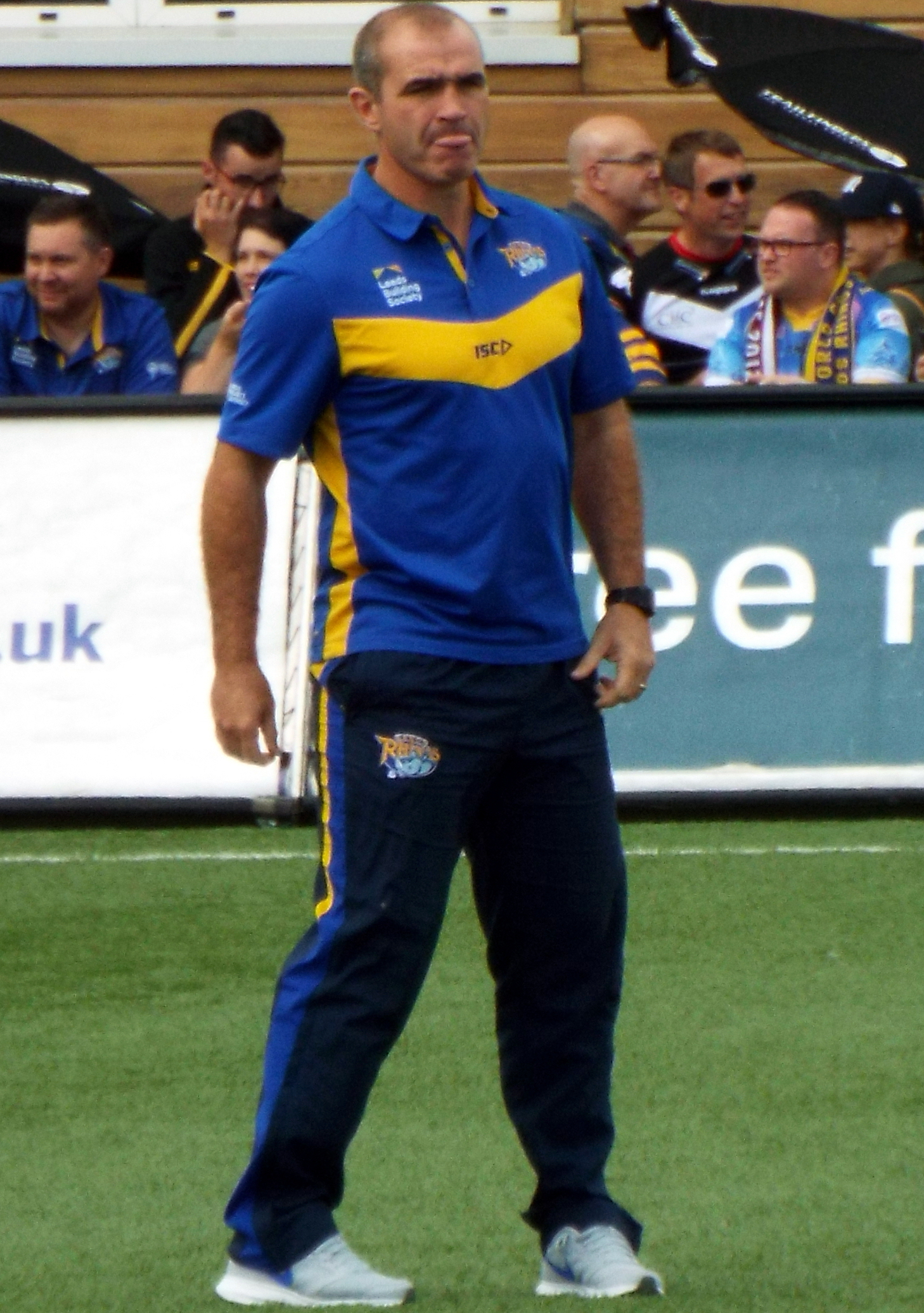

Personal information
- Born: 30 September 1973 (age 52) Wakefield, West Riding of Yorkshire, England

Playing information
- Position: Stand-off, Scrum-half, Hooker
Club
Years	Team	Pld	T	G	FG	P
1993–95	Doncaster	16	4	3	0	22
1995	Wakefield Trinity Wildcats	13	3	24	1	61
1995–01	Dewsbury Rams	188	62	658	17	1581
2000(loan)	→ Castleford Tigers	5	0	3	0	6
2002	Widnes Vikings	27	3	58	4	132
2003–05	Batley Bulldogs	94	14	382	4	824
2006–10	Keighley Cougars	63	12	136	0	320
	Total	406	98	1264	26	2946
Representative
Years	Team	Pld	T	G	FG	P
1999–01	Wales	4	0	0	0	0

Coaching information
Club
Years	Team	Gms	W	D	L	W%
2007–10	Keighley Cougars
2012–16	Hunslet Hawks
	Total	0	0	0	0
- Relatives: Danny Ansell (nephew)

Barry Eaton (born 30 September 1973) is a Welsh former international rugby league footballer who played in the 1990s and 2000s, and coached in the 2000s and 2010s. He played at representative level for Wales, and at club level for Doncaster, Wakefield Trinity, Dewsbury Rams, Castleford Tigers, Widnes Vikings, Batley Bulldogs and the Keighley Cougars, as a stand-off, scrum-half or hooker, and coached at club level for Keighley Cougars and Hunslet Hawks.

== Background ==
Eaton was born Wakefield, West Riding of Yorkshire, England. He is the uncle of the rugby league footballer; Danny Ansell.

== International honours ==
Eaton won caps for Wales while at Dewsbury in the 17-24 defeat by Ireland at Vetch Field, Swansea on Friday 15 October 1999, the 16-36 defeat by Scotland at Firhill Stadium, Glasgow on Friday 22 October 1999, the 40-8 victory over South Africa at Loftus Versfeld Stadium, Pretoria on Thursday 19 October 2000, and the 33-42 defeat by England at the Racecourse Ground, Wrexham on Sunday 29 July 2001.

== Playing career ==
As a schoolboy, Barry Eaton played rugby league for Stanley Rangers, and both rugby league, and football (soccer) for both Wakefield district, and Yorkshire county, this was followed by an apprenticeship with football club Barnsley from 1990 to 1992, in 1993 he joined rugby league club Doncaster, gaining promotion to the First Division in that year, he was briefly at Wakefield Trinity from August 1995 to November 1995, after which he joined Dewsbury, in 1997 he was the "Supporters' Player of the Year", in 1999 he was a Trans-Pennine Cup and First Division title winner, and a First Division Grand Final runner-up, he set both of Dewsbury's "goals in a season" and "points in a season" records, and was "Supporters' Player of the Year" again, in 2000 he played and scored in every game, and was a First Division title, and First Division Grand Final winner. In 2000 he had a loan spell with Castleford in 2000's Super League V.

In 2001 he joined Widnes, and played in all but three of their 28 matches in 2002's Super League VII. In October 2002 he joined Northern Ford Premiership club Batley, he played and scored in all 35-games first team games in season 2003, and in all 30-games in season 2004, he established a new world record by landing 38 consecutive successful goal kicks between 29 June 2003 and 24 August 2003, and set Batley's "goals in a season" record, he was "Supporters' Player of the Year", and "Coaches' Player of the Year", between 2002 and 2005 he played and scored in 70 consecutive games, and equalled record for fastest century of goals from start of season in 17-games.

== Coaching career ==
Barry Eaton moved to Keighley as player-coach in 2005. He retired from playing and was given full control of the team when Peter Roe became Director of Rugby in 2007, although he continued to make sporadic on-field appearances during that season. In both 2008 and 2009 he was nominated for Championship 1 coach of the year. After leading Keighley to promotion, he was unable to keep them in the Co-operative Championship, he then moved to Crusaders to become assistant to Iestyn Harris for 2011's Super League XVI. He then moved to Hunslet Hawks in August 2011.
