= Championship Grand Final =

Rugby league final in the UK

- Teams: 2
- First meeting: 2003
- Latest meeting: 2026
- Next meeting: 2027

Statistics
- Most wins: Leigh Leopards (3 titles)

The Championship Grand Final (previously the National League One Grand Final) is the championship-deciding game of the Championship competition via the playoffs. In 2022 and 2023 the Grand Final was also used to determine promotion to Super League.

== History ==
=== 2003–2007: Promotion ===
In 2003 as the Second Division was rebranded National League One and promotion and relegation was reintroduced between the Super League and National League One. Rather than having a traditional one up one down system, the RFL decided to implement a top 6 playoff system that was being used in the Super League at the time to decide promotion.

=== 2008–2014: Licensing ===
In 2007 it was announced licensing was to be introduced for the 2008 season, replacing promotion and relegation, but the Grand Final would be retained and the division would be rebranded the Championship.

Salford and Celtic Crusaders were the first teams to be awarded Super League licenses and both teams reached the Grand Final which was reduced to being decided by a 5 team playoff, however it would return to six teams the following season.

In 2013, the playoffs were expanded for the first time to eight teams as it had been seen to be a success in the Super League for a number of years before. The eight team playoff would be the last before it was announced the Championship Grand Final would be scrapped in 2014 due to a league restructure in 2015.

=== 2015–2018: Million Pound Game ===
In 2015 the Championship Grand Final was effectively replaced with the Million Pound Game. In the new league structure the top four Championship clubs would form a mini league with the bottom four Super League clubs. Teams finishing in the top three were promoted to Super League while teams in the bottom three were relegated to the Championship, meanwhile teams finishing 4th and 5th would play each other in the Million Pound Game for the final Super League place. In the four years it was contested three Championship clubs competed in it with 2018 being the only time both teams in it were from the Championship.

=== 2019–present: Reintroduction ===
After scrapping the Super 8s in 2019 the RFL Championship Grand Final returned as the promotion deciding game. Despite this, the "Million Pound Game" name was still kept for marking purposes until the 2022 season.

== Results ==
Year	Winners	Score	Runner-up	Stadium	Attendance
2003	Salford	31–14	Leigh	Halton Stadium	9,186
2004	Leigh	32–16	Whitehaven	Halton Stadium	11,005
2005	Castleford	36–8	Whitehaven	Halton Stadium	13,300
2006	Hull KR	29–16	Widnes	Halliwell Jones Stadium	
2007	Castleford	42–10	Widnes	Headingley	20,814
2008	Salford	36–18	Celtic Crusaders	Halton Stadium	7,104
2009	Barrow	26–18	Halifax	Halliwell Jones Stadium	11,398
2010	Halifax	23–22	Featherstone	Halliwell Jones Stadium	9,443
2011	Featherstone	40–4	Sheffield	Halliwell Jones Stadium	7,263
2012	Sheffield	20–16	Featherstone	Halliwell Jones Stadium	6,409
2013	Sheffield	19–12	Batley	Leigh Sports Village	6,800
2014	Leigh	36–12	Featherstone	Headingley	9,164
For 2015-2018 see Million Pound Game
2019	Toronto Wolfpack	24–6	Featherstone Rovers	Lamport Stadium	9,974
2020	Season cancelled due to the COVID-19 pandemic				
2021	Toulouse Olympique	34–12	Featherstone Rovers	Stade Ernest-Wallon	9,235
2022	Leigh Centurions	44–12	Batley Bulldogs	Leigh Sports Village	7,233
2023	London Broncos	18–14	Toulouse Olympique	Stade Ernest-Wallon	3,974
2024	Wakefield Trinity	36–0	Toulouse Olympique	Belle Vue	8,016
2025	Toulouse Olympique	10–8	York Knights	York Community Stadium	
2026	London Broncos	78-6	Doncaster	Plough Lane	

=== Winners ===
Club	Wins	Runners-up	Winning years
Leigh Centurions	3	1	2004, 2014, 2022
Toulouse Olympique	2	2	2021, 2025
Sheffield Eagles	2	1	2012, 2013
Castleford Tigers	2	0	2005, 2007
London Broncos	2	0	2023, 2026
Salford Red Devils	2	0	2003, 2008
Featherstone Rovers	1	5	2011
Halifax	1	1	2010
Barrow Raiders	1	0	2009
Hull Kingston Rovers	1	0	2006
Toronto Wolfpack	1	0	2019
Wakefield Trinity	1	0	2024
Batley Bulldogs	0	2	N/A
Whitehaven	0	2	N/A
Widnes Vikings	0	2	N/A
Celtic Crusaders	0	1	N/A
York Knights	0	1	N/A

== See also ==
- Super League Grand Final
- League 1 Promotion Final
- Championship Leaders' Shield
