= Rugby Football League Championship Second Division =

Second level of British rugby league

RFL Championship Second Division
- Sport: Rugby league
- Instituted: 1902-1996 (as Second Division); 1996-1998 (as Division One); 1999-2002 (as Northern Premiership)
- Ceased: 2002
- Replaced by: Championship
- Country: England
- Most titles: Leigh Centurions; Salford Red Devils; Oldham (3 titles)
- Related competition: Challenge Cup
- Promotion to: First Division
- Relegation to: Third Division

The Rugby Football League Championship Second Division was founded in 1902 and was the second tier of professional rugby league in the UK until 2003.

During the 1990s a third division was established and there is automatic promotion between the second and third division.

== History ==
The Second Division was formed in 1902 by splitting the RFL Championship into two divisions of 18. After three seasons the Second Division was abolished and not resurrected until 1962. Two seasons later in 1964 the Second Division was scrapped for the second time.

The division was resurrected again in 1973 and has been played every season since. During the 1991–92 season, a third division was established and, for the first time, two teams were relegated. There was no regular relegation from the Second Division until 2003.

In 1995, in anticipation for the Super League starting in 1996, six teams were relegated from the RFL Championship, five were relegated to the Second Division and one was relegated to form the Third Division. Controversy was caused as London Broncos, who finished 4th in the Second Division, were elected to the Championship ahead of Keighley, Batley and Huddersfield.

In 2003, the divisions under Super League were reorganised into the National Leagues with Second and Third Divisions becoming National League One and National League Two.

== Results ==
Year	Champions	Promoted	Relegated	Ref
1902-03	Keighley	Keighley; Leeds	No Relegation	
1903-04	Wakefield Trinity	Wakefield Trinity; St. Helens	No Relegation	
1904-05	Dewsbury	All: Divisions combined in 1905–06 season	No Relegation	
1905-1962: No Second Division
1962-63	Hunslet	Hunslet; Keighley	No Relegation	
1963-64	Oldham	All: Divisions combined in 1964–65 season	No Relegation	
1964-1973: No Second Division
1973-74	Bradford Northern	Bradford Northern; York; Keighley; Halifax	No Relegation	
1974-75	Huddersfield	Huddersfield; Hull Kingston Rovers; Oldham; Swinton	No Relegation	
1975-76	Barrow	Barrow; Rochdale Hornets; Workington; Leigh	No Relegation	
1976-77	Hull F.C.	Hull; Dewsbury; Bramley; New Hunslet	No Relegation	
1977-78	Leigh	Leigh; Barrow; Rochdale Hornets; Huddersfield	No Relegation	
1978-79	Hull F.C.	Hull; New Hunslet; York; Blackpool	No Relegation	
1979-80	Featherstone Rovers	Featherstone Rovers; Halifax; Oldham; Barrow	No Relegation	
1980-81	York	York; Wigan; Fulham; Whitehaven	No Relegation	
1981-82	Oldham	Oldham; Carlisle; Workington; Halifax	No Relegation	
1982-83	Fulham	Fulham; Wakefield Trinity; Salford; Whitehaven	No Relegation	
1983-84	Barrow	Barrow; Workington; Hunslet; Halifax	No Relegation	
1984-85	Swinton	Swinton; Salford; York; Dewsbury	No Relegation	
1985-86	Leigh	Leigh; Barrow; Wakefield Trinity	No Relegation	
1986-87	Hunslet	Hunslet; Swinton	No Relegation	
1987-88	Oldham	Oldham; Featherstone Rovers; Wakefield Trinity	No Relegation	
1988-89	Leigh	Leigh; Barrow; Sheffield Eagles	No Relegation	
1989-90	Hull Kingston Rovers	Hull Kingston Rovers; Rochdale Hornets; Oldham	No Relegation	
1990-91	Salford	Salford; Halifax; Swinton	All below top 8 relegated to new Third Division	
1991-92	Sheffield	Sheffield; Leigh	Ryedale-York; Workington	
1992-93	Featherstone Rovers	Featherstone Rovers; Oldham	Second and Third Division merged	
1993-94	'Workington	Workington; Doncaster	No Relegation	
1994-95	Keighley	London Broncos	All below top 7 relegated to new Third Division	
1995-96	Salford Reds	No Promotion	No Relegation	
1996	Salford Reds	Salford Reds	Rochdale Hornets; Batley	
1997	Hull	Hull; Huddersfield	Widnes; Workington	
1998	Wakefield Trinity	Wakefield Trinity	Division One and Two merged	
1999	Hunslet Hawks	No Promotion	No Relegation	
2000	Dewsbury	No Promotion	No Relegation	
2001	Widnes	Widnes	No Relegation	
2002	Huddersfield	Huddersfield	No Relegation	

== Winners ==
	Club	Wins	Winning Year
1	Leigh Centurions	3	1976-77, 1985–86, 1988–89
=	Salford Red Devils	3	1990-91, 1995–96, 1996
=	Oldham	3	1963-64, 1981–82, 1987–88
4	Barrow Raiders	2	1975-76, 1983–84
=	Featherstone Rovers	2	1979-80, 1992–93
=	Keighley Cougars	2	1902-03, 1994–95
=	Dewsbury Rams	2	1904-05, 2000
=	Hunslet	2	1986–87, 1999
=	Wakefield Trinity	2	1903-04, 1998
=	Huddersfield Giants	2	1974-75, 2002
=	Hull F.C.	2	1976-77, 1978–79
12	Hunslet (1883)	1	1962-63
=	Bradford Bulls	1	1973-74
=	York	1	1980-81
=	Fulham	1	1982-83
=	Swinton Lions	1	1984-85
=	Hull Kingston Rovers	1	1989-90
=	Sheffield Eagles	1	1991-92
=	Workington Town	1	1993-94
=	Widnes Vikings	1	2001

- § Denotes club now defunct

== See also ==
- Rugby Football League Championship
- Rugby Football League Championship Third Division
