= Hunslet R.L.F.C. =

English rugby league club in Leeds

Club information
- Full name: Hunslet Rugby League Football Club
- Nickname: Parksiders
- Colours: Myrtle, flame and white
- Founded: 1973; 53 years ago
- Website: hunsletrlfc.com

Current details
- Ground: South Leeds Stadium (4,000)
- CEO: Neil Hampshire
- Chairman: Ken Sykes
- Coach: Kyle Trout
- Captain: Billy Jowitt
- Competition: Championship
- 2026 season: 13th
- Current season

Uniforms
Home colours

Hunslet R.L.F.C. is a professional rugby league club in Beeston, Leeds, West Yorkshire, England. They play home games at South Leeds Stadium and compete in Championship, the second tier of British rugby league.

The club was formed as a Phoenix club after the original Hunslet club folded.

== History ==
=== 1973–1996: New club ===
In July 1973, the original Hunslet club was wound up following the sale of their Parkside ground, because no suitable new location could be found that was financially viable. The £300,000 proceeds of the sale of Parkside were distributed to shareholders.

Due to the efforts of their former Great Britain forward Geoff Gunney (MBE), local businessmen and supporters the club managed to reform as New Hunslet for the 1973–74 season and moved to the Leeds Greyhound Stadium and erected iron American football posts. The resurrected club had a new badge depicting a rising phoenix to symbolise their rebirth. In 1974, New Hunslet adopted green and white as team colours because the traditional myrtle, white and flame colours were still registered to the former Parkside-based club, and they would not release them. The stay at the greyhound stadium was cut short when the owners closed the ground and arranged to demolish everything on the site.

In 1978, coach Bill Ramsey put a lot of pressure on the RFL and finally got permission to use the traditional colours. The club reverted to Hunslet for the 1979–80 season. With the closure of the Greyhound stadium, the next ground to host Hunslet was Mount Pleasant, Batley, for two seasons, before Hunslet moved to Leeds United's Elland Road football stadium then owned by Leeds City Council. After leaving Elland Road, Hunslet had a brief spell at Bramley.

On 19 November 1995, the club, now known as Hunslet Hawks, moved to the South Leeds Stadium, only about half a mile from Parkside. On that day, Leigh were the guests at Hunslet's first home game for twenty-two years. They then narrowly missed out on promotion from Division Two in 1996. Coach Steve Ferres left to join Huddersfield and David Plange took over as player-coach.

=== 1996–2009: Summer era ===
In 1997 the Hawks played in the first (and last) Challenge Cup Plate Final losing 60–14 to Hull Kingston Rovers. It was the Hawks first appearance at Wembley Stadium since 1965. Also in 1997, the Hawks were promoted to the First Division as champions.

In 1999 as a possible merger between Hunslet and Bramley was debated. In 1999 Hunslet won the Northern Ford Premiership Grand Final against Dewsbury, 12–11, at Headingley. After that game the Hawks were denied entry to Super League by the Rugby Football League who cited a document called Framing the Future as justification. This caused a number of players to leave the club and for the average attendance to fall by more than 1,200 to 800. A link-up with Leeds Rhinos saw Plange go to Headingley as Academy coach.

2004 saw the re-establishment the annual friendly against Leeds Rhinos for the Lazenby Cup, a trophy that had previously been contested between Hunslet F.C. and Leeds since 1912.

Paul March was the player/coach at Hunslet, joining midway through the 2009 season following the resignation of Graeme Hallas. March guided Hunslet to a 6th-place finish and a play-off spot in Championship 1. Hunslet travelled to Blackpool in the first week of the play-offs winning, 18–21, to set up an elimination semi-final against Oldham in which Hunslet were comfortably beaten, 54–30.

=== 2010–present: Promotions and silverware ===
In 2010 Paul March led Hunslet to their first silverware for over 11 years by securing the Co-operative Championship 1 title, and subsequent survival in 2011.

In 2012, Barry Eaton took over as coach. In 2014 Hunslet won the Grand Final after extra time against Oldham, thus gaining promotion to the Championship. Barry Eaton left in late January 2016 to join Leeds Rhinos and was replaced by his assistant coach and former Hunslet Hawks player Matt Bramald. Bramald left the club at the end of the 2016 season having completed his contract. He was replaced by former Hunslet player James Coyle.

Hunslet Hawks returned to their original name of Hunslet RLFC for the 2017 season following an overwhelming fan vote in favour of their original name. Fans were then asked to choose between the clubs' original 'Rampant Lion' crest and the 'Phoenix Rising' crest adopted by the club in 1973 when the club was reformed. Fans voted 54% to 46% in favour of the lion. On 13 October 2024, Hunslet earned promotion to the championship after beating Swinton 22–20 in the relegation/promotion playoff match. In the 2025 RFL Championship season, Hunslet finished bottom of the table recording just two wins all year.

== Colours and crest ==
Old crest

Hunslet play in myrtle, flame and white, with away colours mainly being white. The club's original crest was a 'Rampant Lion' but as part of a rebrand at the start of the summer era was the introduction of the Hunslet Hawks. In 2017, the club's fans voted to drop Hawks from their name and reinstate the 'Rampant Lion' crest.

== Stadia ==
=== 1973–1980: Leeds Greyhound Stadium ===
The new Hunslet club's first ground was the Elland Road Greyhound Stadium in Beeston after they were told they could not play at Parkside. American football posts were erected to be used as goal posts.

=== 1980–1982: Mount Pleasant ===
In 1982, the greyhound stadium closed and Hunslet were left homeless. For two seasons they ground-shared with Batley while they searched for a permanent home in Leeds.

=== 1982–1995: Elland Road ===
In 1982, after leaving Batley, Hunslet negotiated a deal with Leeds City Council to play at Leeds United's Elland Road, which the council owned at the time.

=== 1995–present: South Leeds Stadium ===
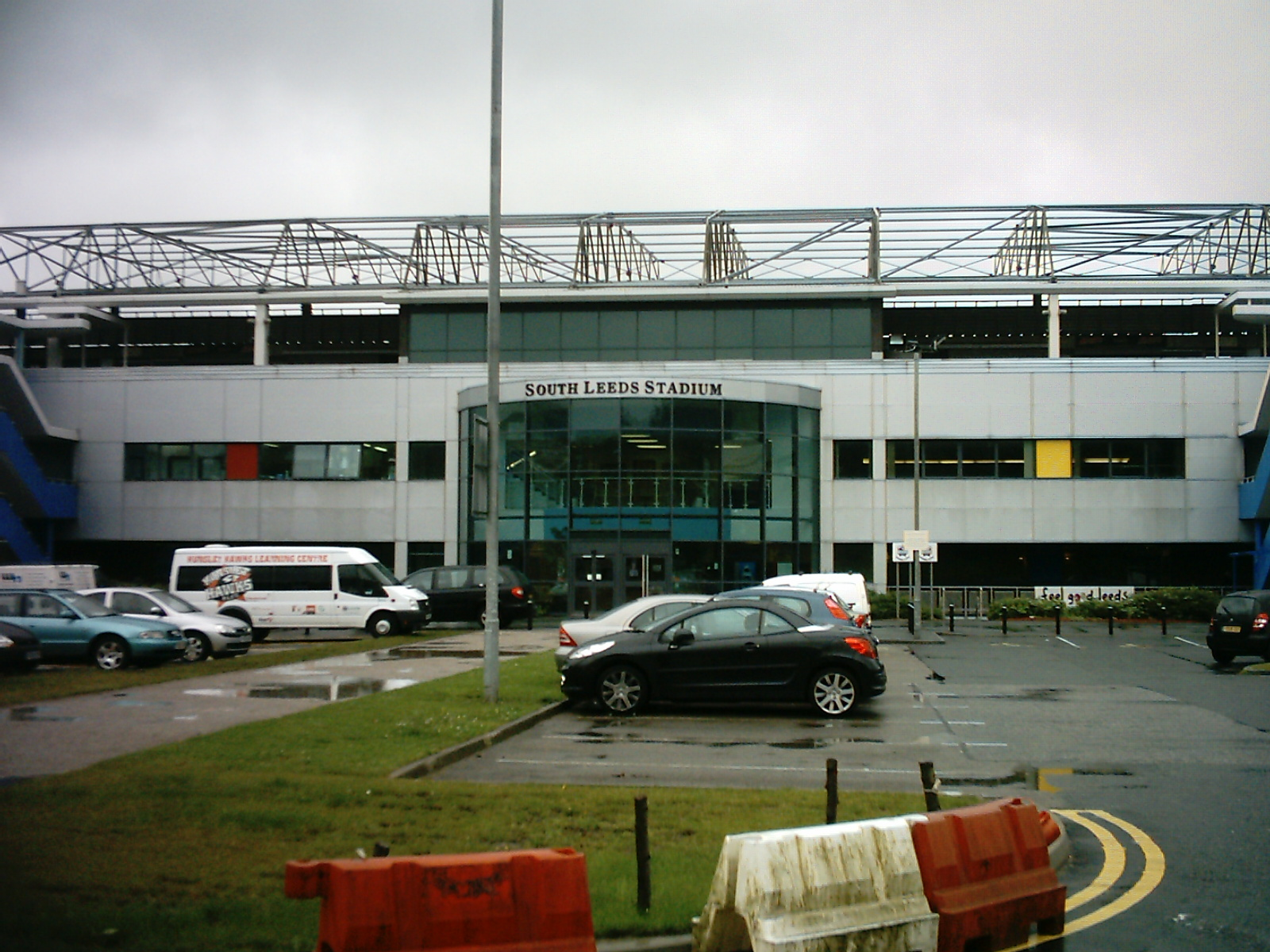
Grandstand at the South Leeds Stadium

Hunslet moved into the South Leeds Stadium, Beeston, Leeds after it was built in 1995. The stadium is used to host athletics and also has a swimming pool and other facilities the club can use. The stadium has one main stand that accommodates the grounds 5,000 capacity.

== 2027 squad ==
Hunslet RLFC 2027 Squad
| First team squad | | | Coaching staff |
|---|---|---|---|
| (Jamaica) Mo Agoro – WG; (England) Jordon Baker – PR; (England) Jordan Baldwinson – PR, LF; (England) Liam Carr – SR, PR; (England) Lee Gaskell – SO, FB, CE; (England) Harrison Gilmore – SR; (England) Alfie Goddard – WG, CE | (England) Harvey Hallas – PR; (England) Myles Harrop – CE; (England) Jayden Hatton – CE, WG; (England) Ben Johnson – CE; (England) Billy Jowitt (c) – FB, SO, CE, SH; (Ireland) Ethan O'Hanlon – PR; (England) Dom Tydeman – HK, CE, SO | (England) Mackenzie Turner – WG; (Wales) Ant Walker – PR; (England) Jack Ward – SH, SO; (England) Will Wilson – PR; (England) Archie Wright – SH, SO | Head coach: (England) Kyle Trout; Assistant coaches: (England) Michael Knowles; (England) Dave Merrick; Legend: (c) Captain(s); (vc) Vice-captain(s) |

== 2027 transfers ==
=== Gains ===
| Player | From | Contract | Date |
|---|---|---|---|
| (England) Jordan Baldwinson | Doncaster | 1 year | 13 October 2026 |
| (England) Ben Johnson | Hull FC | 1 year | 14 October 2026 |
| (England) Jordon Baker | Hull FC | 1 year | 28 October 2026 |
| (England) Will Wilson | Hull FC | 1 year | 30 October 2026 |
| (England) Archie Wright | Bradford Bulls | 1 year | 5 November 2026 |

=== Losses ===
| Player | To | Contract | Date |
|---|---|---|---|
| (England) Keelan Foster | | | 3 September 2026 |
| (Australia) Darcy Simpson | | | 3 September 2026 |
| (Australia) Elijah Simpson | | | 3 September 2026 |
| (England) Charlie Graham | Halifax Panthers | 1 year | 20 September 2026 |
| (England) Dan Abram | Swinton Lions | 1 year | 26 October 2026 |
| (England) Cam Berry | Batley Bulldogs | 1 year | 28 October 2026 |
| (England) Eddie Battye | Birmingham Hurricanes | 1 year | 2 November 2026 |

=== Retired ===
| Player | Date |
|---|---|
| (France) Kevin Larroyer | 3 September 2026 |
| (England) Jimmy Watson | 3 September 2026 |

== Players ==
=== Players earning international caps while at Hunslet ===
- Frank Davies won a cap for Wales while at Hunslet in 1978 against England
- Robert 'Iain' Higgins won caps for Scotland while at London Broncos, and Hunslet 1997...2001 1-cap + 1-cap (sub)
- Charlie Wabo won caps for Papua New Guinea while at Hunslet
- Michael Mark won caps for Papua New Guinea while at Hunslet
- Neil Lowe won caps for Scotland while at Hunslet
- Lee Hanlan won caps for Ireland while at Hunslet
- Arthur Clues won caps for Australia while at Wests, and won caps for Other Nationalities while at Leeds, and Hunslet

== Coaches ==
- Jack Walkington 1946–1960
- Fred Ward 1962–1967
- Harry Poole 1969–1971
- Geoff Gunney 1971–1973
- Bill Ramsey 1978–1979
- Paul Daley 1980–1985
- Peter Jarvis 1986–1987
- David Ward 1986–1987
- Nigel Stephenson 1988
- Jack Austin 1988
- Johnny Wolford 1988
- Paul Daley 1990–1991
- Paul Daley 1993
- Stephen Ferres 1994–1996
- David Plange 1996–2000
- Roy Sampson 2000–2006
- Mark Cass 2007
- Graeme Hallas 2008–2009
- Paul March 2010–2011
- Barry Eaton 2012–2015
- Matt Bramald 2016
- James Coyle 2016–2017
- Gary Thornton 2017–2021
- Mark Cass (interim) 2021
- Alan Kilshaw 2021–2023
- Dean Muir 2023–2025

== Seasons ==
=== Super League era ===
| Season | League | | | | | | | | | Play-offs | Challenge Cup | Other competitions | | Name | Tries | Name | Points |
| Season | Division | P | W | D | L | F | A | Pts | Pos | Play-offs | Challenge Cup | Other competitions | | Top try scorer | | Top point scorer | |
|---|---|---|---|---|---|---|---|---|---|---|---|---|---|---|---|---|---|
| 1996 | Division Two | 22 | 18 | 0 | 4 | 730 | 326 | 36 | 3rd | | R4 | | | | | | |
| 1997 | Division Two | 20 | 15 | 0 | 5 | 682 | 256 | 30 | 1st | | R4 | | | | | | |
| 1998 | Division One | 30 | 17 | 1 | 12 | 719 | 575 | 35 | 6th | | R4 | | | | | | |
| 1999 | Northern Ford Premiership | 28 | 21 | 0 | 7 | 845 | 401 | 42 | 2nd | Won in Final | R4 | | | | | | |
| 2000 | Northern Ford Premiership | 28 | 8 | 0 | 20 | 487 | 678 | 16 | 15th | | R4 | | | | | | |
| 2001 | Northern Ford Premiership | 28 | 6 | 1 | 21 | 380 | 959 | 13 | 16th | | R4 | | | | | | |
| 2002 | Northern Ford Premiership | 27 | 3 | 1 | 23 | 438 | 954 | 7 | 17th | | R4 | | | | | | |
| 2003 | National League Two | 18 | 10 | 1 | 7 | 513 | 425 | 21 | 6th | Lost in Elimination Playoffs | R5 | | | | | | |
| 2004 | National League Two | 18 | 10 | 0 | 8 | 475 | 394 | 20 | 6th | | R4 | | | | | | |
| 2005 | National League Two | 18 | 11 | 0 | 7 | 476 | 385 | 22 | 5th | Lost in Elimination Playoffs | R4 | | | | | | |
| 2006 | National League Two | 22 | 4 | 2 | 16 | 411 | 617 | 10 | 10th | | R4 | | | | | | |
| 2007 | National League Two | 22 | 8 | 0 | 14 | 368 | 591 | 31 | 8th | | R4 | | | | | | |
| 2008 | National League Two | 22 | 4 | 0 | 18 | 336 | 778 | 17 | 12th | | R4 | | | | | | |
| 2009 | Championship 1 | 18 | 10 | 0 | 8 | 472 | 411 | 33 | 6th | Lost in Semi Final | R4 | | | | | | |
| 2010 | Championship 1 | 20 | 18 | 0 | 2 | 828 | 305 | 55 | 1st | Promoted as Champions | R5 | | | | | | |
| 2011 | Championship | 20 | 4 | 1 | 15 | 395 | 630 | 20 | 7th | | R4 | | | | | | |
| 2012 | Championship | 18 | 2 | 0 | 16 | 248 | 684 | 10 | 9th | | R4 | | | | | | |
| 2013 | Championship | 26 | 6 | 0 | 20 | 529 | 704 | 30 | 13th | | R4 | | | | | | |
| 2014 | Championship 1 | 20 | 15 | 5 | 0 | 716 | 249 | 49 | 2nd | Won in Final | R5 | | | | | | |
| 2015 | Championship | 23 | 5 | 0 | 18 | 362 | 769 | 10 | 11th | | R5 | | | | | | |
| 2015 | Championship Shield | 30 | 8 | 0 | 22 | 518 | 957 | 16 | 7th | | R5 | | | | | | |
| 2016 | League 1 | 21 | 11 | 0 | 10 | 544 | 550 | 22 | 7th | | R5 | | | | | | |
| 2017 | League 1 | 15 | 7 | 0 | 8 | 418 | 377 | 14 | 10th | Won in Shield Final | R4 | | | | | | |
| 2018 | League 1 | 26 | 15 | 0 | 11 | 735 | 596 | 30 | 7th | | R4 | | | | | | |
| 2019 | League 1 | 20 | 12 | 0 | 8 | 596 | 379 | 24 | 5th | Lost in Elimination Playoffs | R4 | 1895 Cup | R1 | | | | |
| 2020 | League 1 | League abandoned due to the COVID-19 pandemic | | | | | | | | | R5 | | | | | | |
| 2021 | League 1 | 18 | 9 | 3 | 6 | 564 | 435 | 21 | 6th | Lost in Elimination Playoffs | Did not participate | | | | | | |
| 2022 | League 1 | 20 | 8 | 1 | 11 | 513 | 524 | 17 | 7th | | R4 | | | | | | |
| 2023 | League 1 | 18 | 14 | 0 | 4 | 572 | 284 | 28 | 2nd | Lost in Preliminary Final | R3 | | | | | | |
| 2024 | League One | 20 | 13 | 0 | 7 | 522 | 534 | 26 | 4th | Won in Promotion Final | R3 | 1895 Cup | GS | | | | |
| 2025 | Championship | 24 | 2 | 0 | 22 | 256 | 1058 | 4 | 13th | | R3 | 1895 Cup | R1 | | | | |
| 2026 | Championship | 24 | 8 | 0 | 16 | 496 | 776 | 16 | 14th | | R3 | 1895 Cup | R1 | | | | |

== Honours ==
- Division 2 / Championship:

Winners (1): 1999

- Division 3 / League 1:

Winners (2): 2010, 2014

- League 1 Shield:

Winners: 2017

- League 1 Play-Off Final:

Winners: 2024
