= 2022 Keighley Cougars season =

- 2022 League One champions
- 2022 League One Rank: 1
- Challenge Cup: Lost in 2nd round
- 2022 record: Wins: 20; draws: 0; losses: 1
- Points scored: For: 995; against: 216

Team information
- Chairman: Mick O'Neil
- Coach: Rhys Lovegrove
- Captain: Jack Miller
- Stadium: Cougar Park
- Avg. attendance: 1,625
- Agg. attendance: 16,250
- High attendance: 2,712 v North Wales Crusaders, 28 August

Top scorers
- Tries: Mo Agoro (28)
- Goals: Jack Miller (134)
- Points: Jack Miller (340; 18t, 134g)

The 2022 season was the Keighley Cougars' 122nd year in the Rugby Football League (RFL). Since 2015 the team had competed in League One, the third tier of professional rugby league in the United Kingdom. In 2022 the team competed in the League One season, Challenge Cup and the 1895 Cup.

After three early defeats in pre-season fixtures and the Challenge Cup, the Cougars went on to win all 20 league games and become only the third British team to complete a perfect season. (Note: The first club to register a perfect season were Hull F.C. in the 1978–79 season. The feat was repeated by Dewsbury Rams in 2009.)

Winger Mo Agoro was the League 1 leading try-scorer with 28 tries, centre Charlie Graham was second in the table with 22 tries, while team captain Jack Miller was the division's regular season top goal-scorer, kicking 134 goals as well as scoring 18 tries, to make him the division's top-scorer with 338 points.

In the RFL end of season awards, the club was named Betfred League One Club of the Year while head coach Rhys Lovegrove was named Betfred League One Coach of the Year and Jack Miller was named Betfred League One Player of the Year. Mo Agoro was also nominated for the player of the year award.

== Squad ==
Head coach Rhys Lovegrove was starting his fourth season with the club after taking the club to the play-off preliminary final in 2021. Former London Broncos coach Andrew Henderson was appointed as head of rugby in October 2021. The two then set about assembling a squad for 2022.

2022 Keighley Cougars squad
First team squad			Coaching staff
1 Quentin Laulu-Togaga'e – FB; 2 Charlie Graham – WG; 3 Jake Webster – CE; 4 Taylor Prell – CE (*); 5 Mo Agoro – WG; 6 Retired; 7 Jack Miller (c) – SO, SH; 8 Brenden Santi – PR; 9 Kyle Kesik – HK; 10 Anesu Mudoti – PR; 11 Dan Parker – SR; 12 Aaron Levy – SR, LF; 13 Scott Murrell – SH, SO	14 Billy Gaylor – PR, SR; 15 Keiron Moran – PR (*); 16 Dalton Desmond-Walker – PR; 17 Josh Slingsby – WG, CE (*); 17 Eddy Pettybourne – PR (+); 18 Alix Stephenson – CE, WG; 19 Matthew Bailey – SR; 20 Dane Chisholm – SH (+); 21 Josh Lynam – SR; 22 Spencer Darley – PR; 23 Robert Matamosi – WG (*); 23 Junior Sa'u – CE (+); 24 Aidan Scully – CE, SR	25 Chris Cullimore – HK; 26 Anthony Dyne – WG; 27 Nathan Roebuck – WG; 28 Harvey Spence – SH, SO; 29 Myles Tate – PR (*); 30 Lewis Young – FB; 31 Kian Fisher – HK; 32 Bradley Ho – PR; 33 Keenan Dyer-Dixon – WG; 34 Rory Nettleton – PR (*); 35 Toby Everett – PR (+); 36 James Feather – HK, LF; 38 Kyle Trout – PR (+)	Head coach: Rhys Lovegrove; Assistant coaches: Dean Muir; Matt Nicholson; Legend: (c) Captain(s); (vc) Vice-captain(s); (+) Joined club during the season; (*) Left club during the season; Updated: 14 July 2022; Source(s): Squad Numbers

With the squad mostly assembled there were a number of gains and losses during the season. Not all the departures were permanent but included players on loan to other clubs.

=== Arrivals ===
In season arrivals at the club were:

In season arrivals
Player	Club	Date
Toby Everett	Batley Bulldogs (loan)	May 2022
Dane Chisholm	Featherstone Rovers	May 2022
Eddy Pettybourne	Limoux Grizzlies	June 2022
Junior Sa'u	Old Glory DC	June 2022
Kyle Trout	Featherstone Rovers	July 2022

=== Departures and loans ===
A number of players left the club during the season or were loaned to other clubs:

In season departures and loans out
Player	Club	Date
Quentin Laulu-Togaga'e	Sheffield Eagles (loan)	March 2022
Kieran Moran	Hunslet	April 2022
Josh Slingsby	released	May 2022
Kian Fisher	West Wales Raiders (loan)	May 2022
Keenan Dyer-Dixon	West Wales Raiders (loan) (Note: Dyer-Dixon was recalled towards the end of the season.)	May 2022
Robert Matamosi	released	May 2022
Chris Cullimore	Midlands Hurricanes (loan)	May 2022
Taylor Prell	released	June 2022
Myles Tate	Cornwall	July 2022
Rory Nettleton	released	July 2022
Anthony Dyne	West Wales Raiders (loan)	July 2022

== Season summary ==
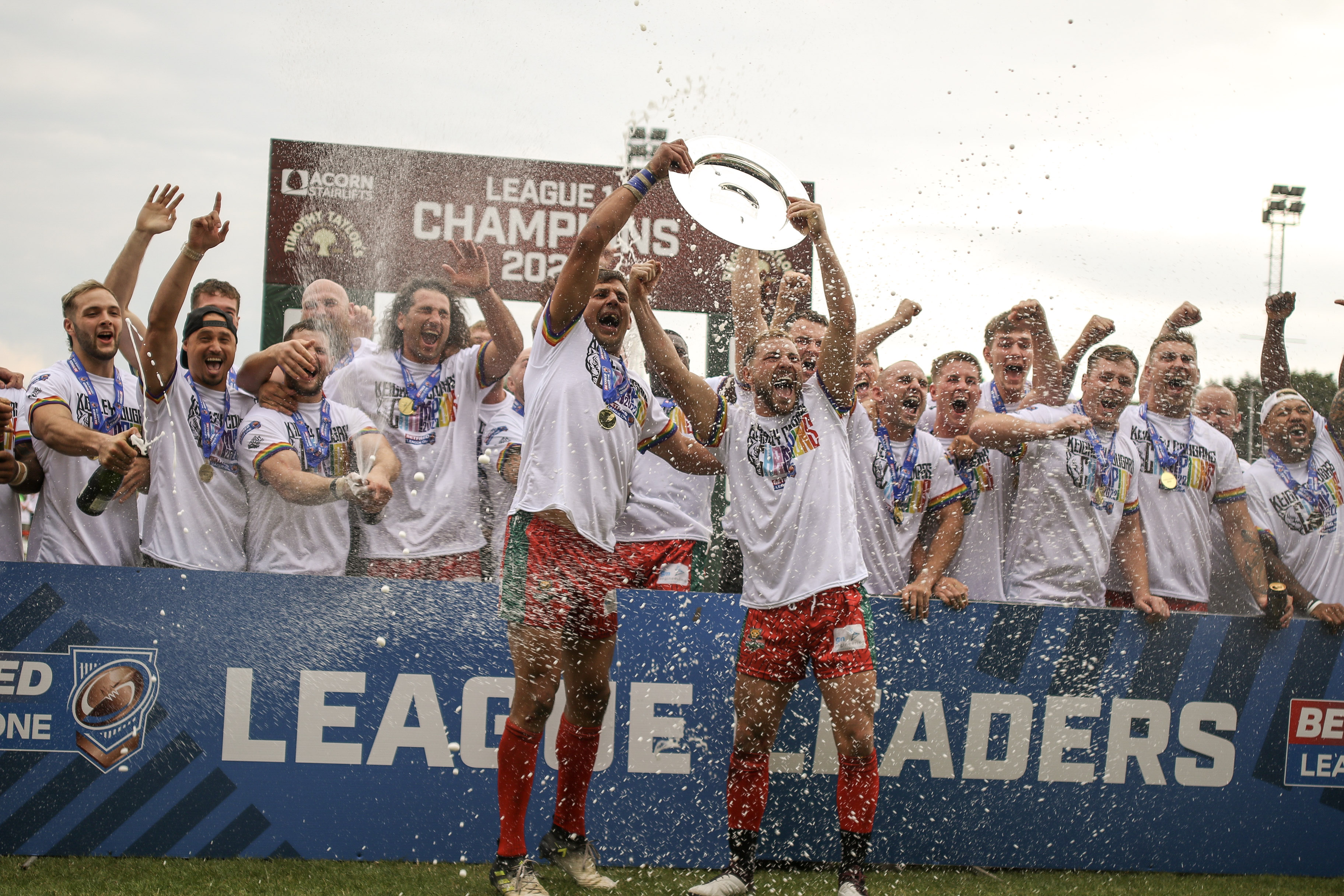
The squad celebrating after being presented with the League One champions trophy on 28 August 2022

The season began in January 2022 with a third round cup match at Hunslet. Due to the way the RFL organised the two cup competitions, the early rounds of the Challenge Cup also served as the early rounds of the 1895 Cup. The match was won 22–6 by Hunslet ending Keighley's interest in the cup competitions. Keighley's only try being scored by debutant Anesu Mudoti. Other debutants in this match were, Lewis Young, Anthony Dyne, Harvey Spence and Nathan Roebuck. The game also saw Spencer Darley and Kyle Kesik sent off and Dan Parker sin-binned. Parker's sin-binning earned him a four-match ban, while Darley's red-card was rescinded and Kesik's deemed sufficient punishment.

With the league season not scheduled to start until the end of March, two pre-season fixtures were arranged against Oldham and Swinton Lions, the two teams who had been relegated from the 2021 Championship. Both matches were home games but ended in two defeats. The Oldham game was lost 26–34 and the Swinton match lost 22–42.

The league season kicked off on 27 March with an away game at Oldham. In a reversal from the pre-season game, three weeks previously, Keighley quickly built a 16–0 lead and never looked under pressure eventually winning 32–6. Prop forwards, Bradley Ho and Rory Nettleton made their debuts in this match.

Round two was the Cougars' first home match of the season against Doncaster. The game marked James Feather's 350th appearance for Keighley and he celebrated the occasion by kicking his first (and last) career goal by taking the conversion to Jake Webster's late try in a 26–6 win.

With an odd number of teams, 11, in the league each team had two bye weeks during the season and round three was the Cougars' first. Round four was a West Yorkshire derby and a return trip to Hunslet on Good Friday. A close game was settled by a Mo Agoro try in the last seconds of the game - from a pass many claimed was forward - but the referee awarded the try to give the Cougars a 20–16 victory.

A return to Cougar Park the following week saw the visit of Swinton Lions. A dominant performance saw Swinton prevented from scoring while a Mo Agoro double helped secure a 30–0 win.

London Skolars were the visitors in round six and were routed as Keighley scored 17 tries and 14 goals to win 96–0, a new home record score, Agoro leading the way with four tries.

Round seven was the long trip to Llanelli to play West Wales Raiders. The game was a debut for Dane Chisholm who had joined Keighley the previous week from Featherstone Rovers. Keighley won 4–46 in a match notable for being the first RFL league match where all five match officials were Welsh.

The home match against Rochdale Hornets in round eight marked the 350th career appearance for veteran centre Jake Webster. Despite going behind to two early Rochdale tries, Keighley took advantage of two Rochdale sin-binnings to win 40–16 with six tries and Jack Miller kicking another eight goals. After the match, forward Billy Gaylor was handed a one-match ban for illegal use of his legs in a tackle.

Midlands Hurricanes were the visitors to Cougar Park in round nine and a close game was only settled in Keighley's favour, 29–18, through a Dane Chisholm drop goal and two late tries by Mo Agoro. With North Wales Crusaders on a bye week, the win also moved the Cougars to first position in the league ahead of the also-undefeated Crusaders on points difference.

With no League One fixtures on the weekend of 28–29 May due to the 2022 Challenge Cup Final being played that weekend, round 10 was not until the first weekend in June. Keighley travelled to Colwyn Bay in a table-topping clash with North Wales Crusaders. The game proved to be one-sided with the Cougars scoring 11 tries, including an Aaron Levy hat-trick, to win 56–12.

The first half of the season ended with the longest trip of the season, to the league's newest club - Cornwall. The Cougars repeated the previous game's scoreline winning 56–12 with a pair of tries each for Mo Agoro, Dane Chisholm and Charlie Graham. Charlie Graham's tries meant that he scored for the ninth game in a row, breaking the club record for scoring in consecutive games set by Nick Pinkney in 1996.

Round 12 welcomed Oldham to Cougar Park, in the return fixture from round one. The match saw Keighley debuts for new signings, Junior Sa'u and Eddy Pettybourne and the team recorded a third clean sheet as they won 62–0 although Graham's scoring run came to an end. Chisholm was sin-binned for dissent in the second half and subsequently given a two-match ban.

Round 13 was the club's annual pride day game. A fourth clean sheet was recorded as West Wales Raiders were defeated 86–0. Keighley scoring 16 tries with Agoro scoring four tries for the second time in the season and in the process overtaking Charlie Graham's newly set record as Agoro scored for the 10th consecutive match.

The following week, Keighley should have visited London Skolars in round 14. The match was scheduled for Saturday 9 July, but the day before the Skolars informed the RFL that they had been unable to arrange the necessary medical cover. The RFL therefore cancelled the match as the RFL's operational rules preclude a match taking place without a doctor being present. The match and league points were awarded to Keighley as a 48–0 victory. The match was also due to be the first match of Chisholm's ban awarded after the Oldham game. The RFL clarified that the cancelled match would count towards the ban.

Cornwall made the longest trip in the division when they were the visitors to Cougar Park in round 15. Like West Wales and Oldham they failed to score as Keighley won 68–0. Kyle Trout scored on his debut, having signed from Featherstone Rovers at the end of June and Mo Agoro scoring another hat-trick.

The Cougars' streak of clean sheets ended in their next game, away at Midlands Hurricanes when Chris Cullimore, on loan from Keighley to the Hurricanes, scored the Hurricanes only try as the Cougars won 54–6, Mo Agoro extended his scoring run to 12 consecutive games while Miller scored three and Levy, Stephenson and Everett all scored two .

Round 17 was the Cougars' second bye week. The way results had panned out meant that Keighley's last five fixtures were against all the other teams in the play-off positions.

First up, in round 18 was an away fixture at Swinton Lions. After taking an early lead, the Cougars then conceded more points in the first half than any other team had scored against them all season to be 20–2 behind just before half-time. A converted Charlie Graham try on half-time meant the second half started 20–8 in Swinton's favour. The Cougars scored three tries through Everett, Sa'u and Trout while restricting Swinton to a single penalty. The difference in the end was that Jack Miller converted all four tries while Swinton's Dan Abram missed two of his conversion attempts. The game also ended Agoro's scoring run at 12 games.

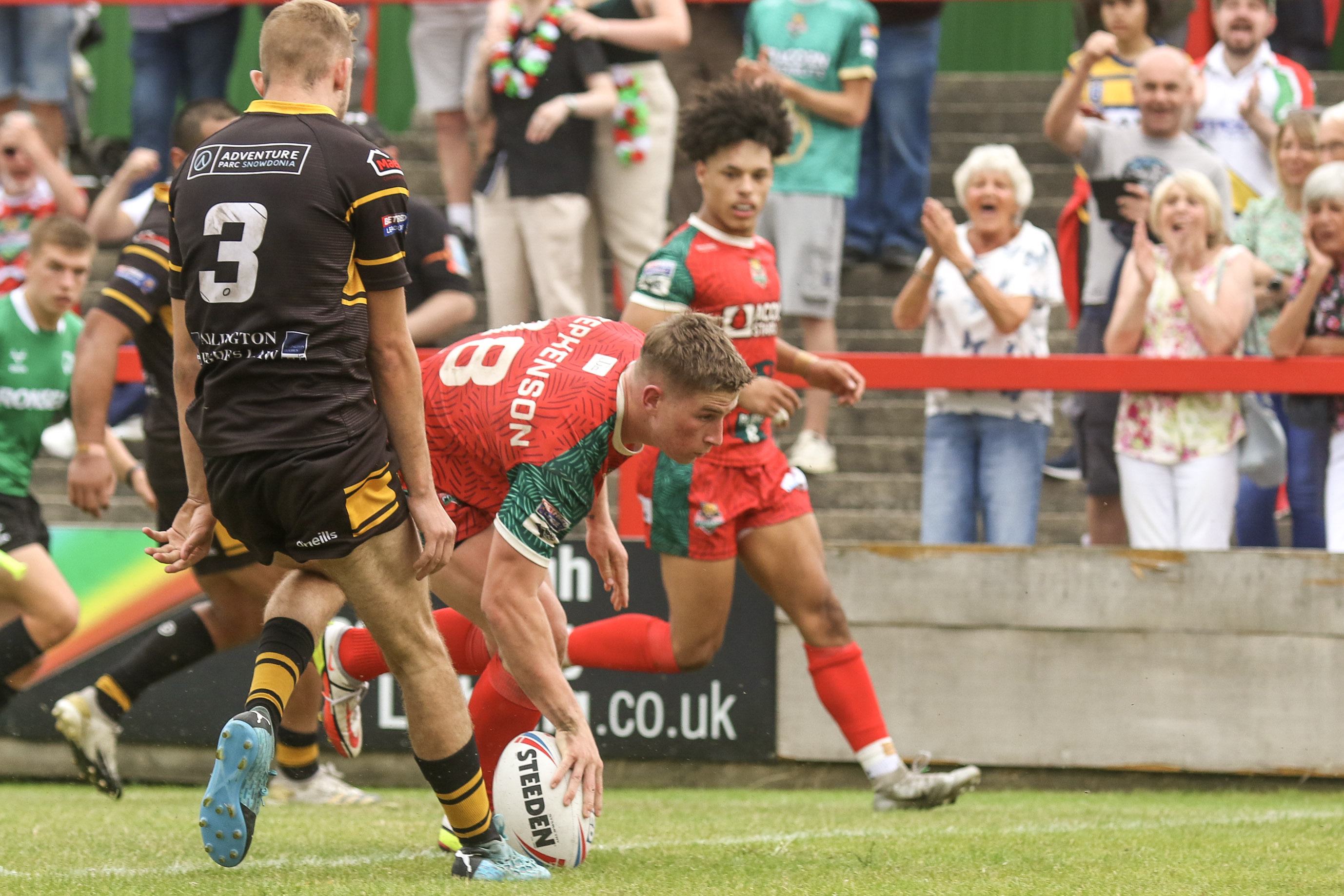
Cougars fans celebrating as Alix Stephenson scores a try against North Wales Crusaders

Round 19 was the home West Yorkshire derby against sixth-place Hunslet, a close game at the start changed to being in Keighley's favour when Hunslet half-back, Matty Beharrell, was sent to the sin-bin and against 12-man opposition, Keighley scored four tries to build a gap between the teams which Hunslet were unable to reply to. The game ended 60–18 to Keighley with Alix Stephenson scoring a hat-trick. Dane Chisholm was sent to the sin-bin during the game for a high tackle and Kyle Kesik was cited by the match review panel for dangerous contact, Chisholm being given a one-match ban and Kesik a two-match ban.

Results meant that Keighley needed just one point from their last three games. Round 20 was away to fourth-place Doncaster. The Cougars scored four tries in the each half to win 48–18 and secure promotion.

The final home game was against second-placed North Wales Crusaders. In front of the largest crowd at Cougar Park this season, it was North Wales who opened the scoring. Keighley then scored four first half tries to lead 20–6 at half time. North Wales scored the first try of the second half but the Cougars then scored five before Rob Massam scored North Wales' third try on the hooter to make the final score 50–16 to the Cougars. The League One trophy was presented to the team after the match.

The last match of the season was away at Rochdale Hornets. Rochdale laid fifth in the table but had hope of finishing fourth if they could beat Keighley and other results went in their favour. However, due to injuries, Rochdale were only able to name a squad of 14 for the game and the lack of numbers showed as the Rochdale players tired and the Cougars ran in 50+ points for the tenth time in the season. The 56–24 win completing the perfect league season. Rochdale did score four tries and in scoring 24 points became the team to score most against Keighley in a competitive game in 2022.

=== Player appearance, scoring and disciplinary records ===
Appearances, points scored and disciplinary records
No	Name	Appearances		Scoring				Discipline	
No	Name	Starts	Int	Tries	Goals	DG	Points	R	Y
1	Quentin Laulu-Togaga'e	0	0						
2	Charlie Graham	20	0	22			88		
3	Jake Webster	12	0	8			32		
4	Taylor Prell	1	0						
5	Mo Agoro	19	0	28			112		
7	Jack Miller	20	0	18	134		340		
8	Brenden Santi	10	4	1			4		
9	Kyle Kesik	13	4	1			4	1	
10	Anesu Mudoti	0	1	1			4		
11	Dan Parker	13	2	5			20		1
12	Aaron Levy	20	0	12			48		
13	Scott Murrell	8	8						
14	Billy Gaylor	8	7	3			12		
15	Kieran Moran	1	0						
16	Dalton Desmond-Walker	0	8						
17	Josh Slingsby	0	0						
17	Eddy Pettybourne	4	1						
18	Alix Stephenson	16	1	13			52		
19	Matthew Bailey	2	13	1			4		1
20	Dane Chisholm	11	1	5		1	21		2
21	Josh Lynam	2	2						
22	Spencer Darley	1	3						
23	Robert Matamosi	0	0						
23	Junior Sa'u	8	0	9			36		
24	Aidan Scully	0	2						
25	Chris Cullimore	1	0						
26	Anthony Dyne	2	0						
27	Nathan Roebuck	13	0	13			52		
28	Harvey Spence	2	11	2			8		
29	Myles Tate	0	0						
30	Lewis Young	19	0	12			48		
31	Kian Fisher	0	0						
32	Bradley Ho	4	3	1			4		
33	Keenan Dyer-Dixon	1	0						
34	Rory Nettleton	0	1						
35	Toby Everett	7	7	5			20		
36	James Feather	18	1	7	1		30		1
38	Kyle Trout	4	0	2			8		

=== League table ===
Pos	Team	Pld	W	D	L	PF	PA	PD	Pts	Qualification
1	Keighley Cougars	20	20	0	0	989	194	+795	40	Champions & promoted to Championship
2	Swinton Lions	20	16	0	4	834	317	+517	32	Advance to qualifying semi-final
3	North Wales Crusaders	20	15	0	5	708	420	+288	30	Advance to qualifying play-off
4	Doncaster	20	15	0	5	720	434	+286	30	Advance to qualifying play-off
5	Rochdale Hornets	20	13	0	7	772	511	+261	26	Advance to elimination play-off
6	Oldham	20	8	1	11	571	526	+45	17	Advance to elimination play-off
7	Hunslet	20	8	1	11	513	524	−11	17	
8	Midlands Hurricanes	20	6	0	14	546	696	−150	12	
9	London Skolars	20	6	0	14	440	827	−387	12	
10	Cornwall	20	1	0	19	276	864	−588	2	
11	West Wales Raiders	20	1	0	19	140	1196	−1056	2	

== Match details ==
Win Loss Walkover

=== Challenge Cup/1895 Cup ===
Date and time	Opponents	H/A	Venue	Result	Score	Tries	Goals	Attendance	Report
30 January, 15:00	Hunslet	A	South Leeds Stadium	L	22–6	Mudoti	Miller	637	

=== Pre-season friendlies ===
Date and time	Opponents	H/A	Venue	Result	Score	Tries	Goals	Attendance	Report
6 March, 15:00	Oldham	H	Cougar Park	L	26–34	Miller, Stephenson, Graham, Slingsby, Scully	Miller (3)	—N/a	
13 March, 15:00	Swinton Lions	H	Cougar Park	L	22–42	Agoro, Feather, Roebuck, Bailey	Miller (2), Spence	—N/a	

=== League One ===
Round	Date and time	Opponents	H/A	Venue	Result	Score	Tries	Goals	Attendance	Report
1	27 March, 15:00	Oldham	A	Whitebank Stadium	W	6–32	Stephenson, Levy (2), Roebuck (2), Young	Miller (4)	815	
2	3 April, 15:00	Doncaster	H	Cougar Park	W	26–6	Graham, Webster, Stephenson, Roebuck, Young	Miller (2), Feather	863	
3	Bye									
4	15 April, 19:45	Hunslet	A	South Leeds Stadium	W	16–20	Graham, Miller, Ho, Agoro	Miller (2)	714	
5	24 April, 15:00	Swinton Lions	H	Cougar Park	W	30–0	Graham, Agoro (2), Miller, Young	Miller (5)	1,233	
6	1 May, 15:00	London Skolars	H	Cougar Park	W	96–0	Graham (2), Webster, Agoro (4), Miller, Kesik, Parker (2), Gaylor, Roebuck (2), Young (2), Feather	Miller (14)	1,148	
7	7 May, 15:00	West Wales Raiders	A	Stebonheath Park	W	4–46	Graham, Agoro (2), Miller (3), Stephenson, Roebuck, Feather	Miller (5)	387	
8	15 May, 15:00	Rochdale Hornets	H	Cougar Park	W	40–16	Feather, Roebuck, Miller, Agoro (2), Graham	Miller (8)	1,847	
9	22 May, 15:00	Midlands Hurricanes	H	Cougar Park	W	29–18	Graham, Agoro (2), Roebuck (2)	Miller (4), Chisholm (1dg)	1,126	
10	4 June, 15:00	North Wales Crusaders	A	Eirias Stadium	W	12–56	Young, Chisholm (2), Stephenson, Levy (3), Agoro, Webster (2), Graham	Miller (6)	835	
11	12 June, 13:00	Cornwall	A	The Memorial Ground	W	12–56	Everett, Young, Spence, Chisholm (2), Stephenson, Agoro (2), Graham (2)	Miller (8)	1,082	
12	26 June, 15:00	Oldham	H	Cougar Park	W	62–0	Feather, Sa'u, Roebuck (2), Levy, Parker, Miller (2), Agoro (2), Webster	Miller (9)	2,427	
13	3 July, 15:00	West Wales Raiders	H	Cougar Park	W	86–0	Graham (2), Webster (2), Agoro (4), Miller, Levy (2), Chisholm, Roebuck (2), Young, Sa'u	Miller (11)	1,924	
14	9 July	London Skolars	A	—N/a	W	0–48	Match forfeited by London Skolars. Under the RFL operational rules the game is recorded as a 48–0 victory to the non-forfeiting team.			
15	17 July, 15:00	Cornwall	H	Cougar Park	W	68–0	Trout, Sa'u (2), Young, Stephenson, Levy, Parker, Miller, Agoro (3), Graham	Miller (10)	1,058	
16	24 July, 15:00	Midlands Hurricanes	A	Portway Stadium	W	6–54	Agoro, Miller (3), Levy (2), Stephenson (2), Everett (2)	Miller (7)	358	
17	Bye									
18	7 August, 15:00	Swinton Lions	A	Heywood Road	W	22–26	Graham, Trout, Sa'u, Everett	Miller (5)	1,090	
19	14 August, 15:00	Hunslet	H	Cougar Park	W	60–18	Graham, Agoro, Miller, Stephenson (3), Gaylor, Bailey, Sa'u, Feather	Miller (10)	2,182	
20	21 August, 15:00	Doncaster	A	Eco-Power Stadium	W	18–48	Young, Sa'u, Everett, Levi, Santi, Miller, Graham (2)	Miller (8)	1,443	
21	28 August, 15:00	North Wales Crusaders	H	Cougar Park	W	50–16	Graham (2), Webster, Miller (2), Parker, Stephenson, Young, Feather	Miller (7)	2,712	
22	4 September, 15:00	Rochdale Hornets	A	Spotland Stadium	W	24–56	Feather, Sa'u, Young, Spence, Stephenson, Agoro, Graham (2)	Miller (8)	963	
