= List of rugby league players who died during matches =

This is a list of professional rugby league players who died during matches, or shortly afterwards due to injuries received/incidents during matches.

Not included are non-first team players, amateur players or deaths unrelated to playing.

== Deaths ==
Date	Name	Age	Team	Notes
14 August 1897	Joseph Gerrard	20	St Helens	Gerrard died after breaking his neck in a practice match.
3 November 1902	John Richardson	21	Cumberland	Richardson, who played at club level for Whitehaven Recreation, died of peritonitis after being accidentally kicked in the abdomen, a kick which ruptured his bowel, during a County Championship match between Cumberland and Yorkshire on 1 November.
19 December 1906	Harry Myers	31	Keighley	Myers fractured his spine in a collision with an opposing player in a match against Dewsbury on 3 November 1906. Died in hospital seven weeks later.
3 December 1921	Pat Collins	32	Keighley	Collins collapsed and died shortly after leaving the pitch in a game against Batley Bulldogs. Coroner ruled he had died from syncope.
4 October 1930	Stanley Baldwin	24	Rochdale Hornets	Baldwin died of a brain stem injury incurred when attempting a tackle in a game against Oldham on 3 October. Baldwin did not recover consciousness after the incident and was taken to hospital where he died the following day.
8 June 1936	Henry Berry	27	Streatham and Mitcham	Berry was kicked in the mouth playing against Warrington on 25 April 1936. The injury became infected with an abscess forming in his jaw. Berry was hospitalised and died of asphyxiation after being given an anaesthetic for an operation to relieve the abscess.
28 September 1946	Frank Townsend	21	Wakefield Trinity	Townsend was injured in a tackle playing against Featherstone Rovers and was helped off the field. He was later taken to hospital, unconscious, where he died of a brain haemorrhage.
12 April 1947	Hudson Irving	34	Halifax	Irving collapsed and died of a heart attack due to a blood clot during the second half of Halifax's match against Dewsbury.
28 November 1955	Dennis Norton	22	Castleford	Norton collapsed during Castleford's match against the touring New Zealand side on 16 November. Norton was subsequently admitted to Pontefract Infirmary where he died on 28 November from a coronary thrombosis.
15 April 1969	John Davies	28	Dewsbury	Davies died of a heart attack during a match against Batley. The coroner returned an open verdict as he could not be sure that an injury sustained in a match two years earlier did not have some effect on Davies's health.
7 May 1976	Jeff Whiteside	22	Swinton	Whiteside broke his neck playing in the first half of a reserve (or A game) against Rochdale Hornets on 3 March 1976. Initially hospitalised in Rochdale, he was later transferred to a specialist spinal unit at Southport hospital in a critical condition. He died at the Southport hospital two months after the accident. The direct cause of death was a haemorrhage from an ulcer in the windpipe that had formed after an operation following the accident.
24 April 1977	Chris Sanderson	22	Leeds	Sanderson died after choking on his own vomit after a tackle early on in a game against Salford. Despite being taken immediately to hospital, doctors were unable to revive him.
3 May 2015	Danny Jones	29	Keighley Cougars	Jones suffered a cardiac arrest during a match against London Skolars and died in hospital shortly afterwards.
