= Mo Agoro =

Jamaica international rugby league footballer

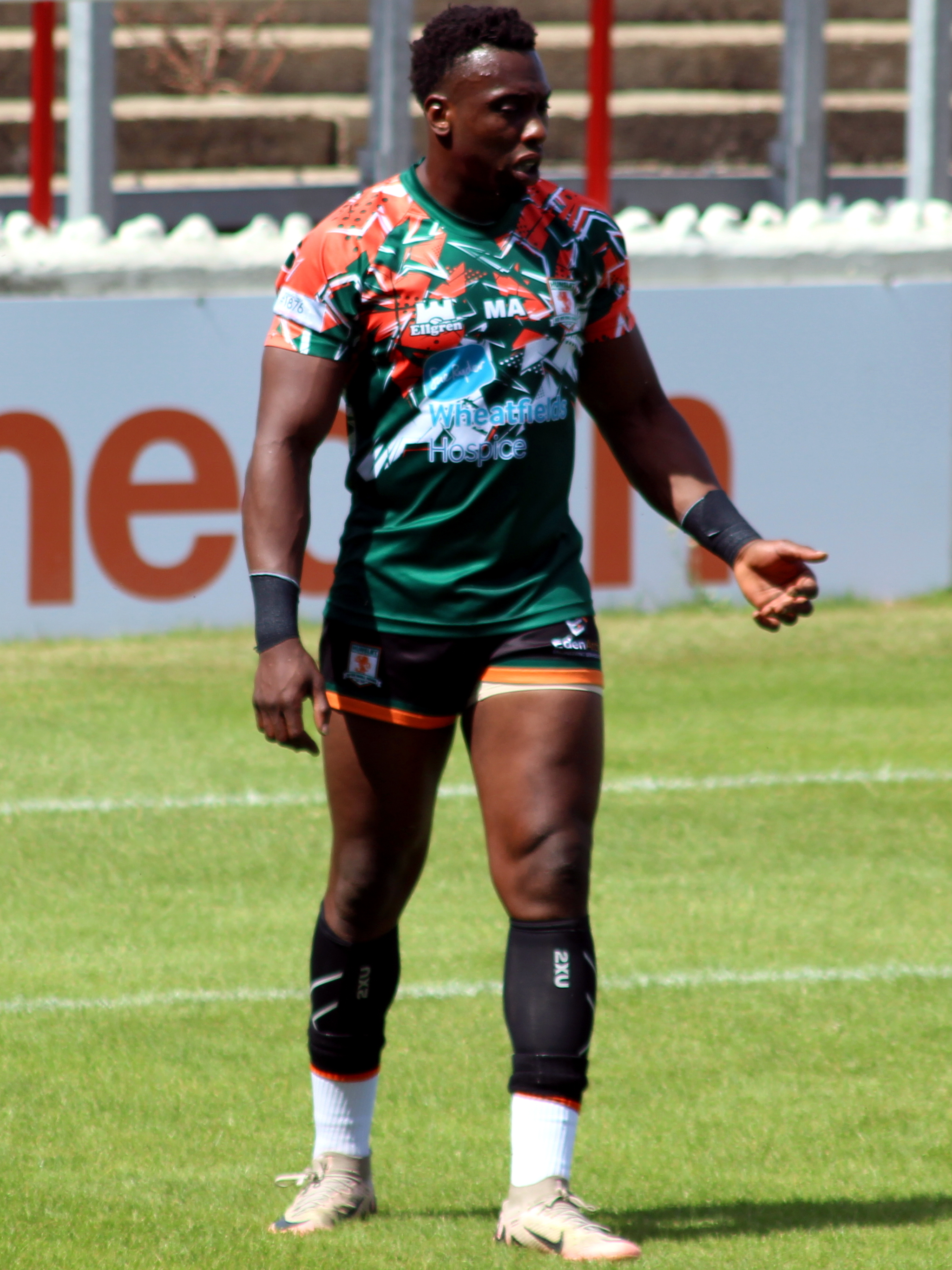

Personal information
- Full name: Mobolaji Agoro
- Born: 29 January 1993 (age 33) Leeds, West Yorkshire, England
- Height: 6 ft 1 in (1.86 m)
- Weight: 15 st 6 lb (98 kg)

Playing information
- Position: Wing, Centre, Second-row
Club
Years	Team	Pld	T	G	FG	P
2013–14	Oldham	40	27	0	0	108
2015–16	Hunslet	19	5	0	0	20
2015(DR)	→ Hemel Stags	5	3	0	0	12
2016–17	Gloucestershire All Golds	35	21	0	0	84
2018–19	Newcastle Thunder	37	22	0	0	88
2019(Loan)	→ London Skolars	4	2	0	0	8
2020–23	Keighley Cougars	59	47	0	0	188
2024–25	Oldham	15	16	0	0	64
2026–	Hunslet	0	0	0	0	0
	Total	214	143	0	0	572
Representative
Years	Team	Pld	T	G	FG	P
2015–	Jamaica	12	1	0	0	4
- Source: As of 24 September 2025

Mo Agoro (born 29 January 1993) is a Jamaica international rugby league footballer who plays as a wing, centre or second-row forward for Hunslet in the RFL Championship.

Agoro has previously played for Oldham (two spells), Keighley Cougars, Hunslet, Gloucestershire All Golds and Newcastle Thunder, with short loan periods at Hemel Stags and London Skolars.

== Playing career ==
=== Oldham ===
Of Nigerian and Jamaican heritage Agoro was raised in Leeds, West Yorkshire, England and played for Leeds Rhinos Academy before signing his first professional contract with Oldham at the end of 2012. After a debut appearance against North Wales Crusaders Agoro went on to play 40 games for Oldham scoring 27 tries in the 2013 and 2014 seasons.

=== Hunslet ===
At the end of the 2014 season he signed for Hunslet where he stayed for two seasons, including a short period in 2015 playing for Hemel Stags with whom Hunslet had a dual registration agreement.

=== Gloucestershire All Golds ===
Partway through the 2016 season, finding first-team appearances at Hunslet limited, Agoro joined Gloucestershire All Golds on loan before making the move permanent in September 2016.

=== Newcastle Thunder ===
With the withdrawal of the All Golds from the league at the end of 2017, Agoro joined Newcastle Thunder for 2018. Extending his stay at Newcastle for 2019, Agoro scored 22 tries in 37 appearances before joining London Skolars on loan in July 2019.

=== Keighley Cougars ===
Released by Newcastle following the conclusion of the 2019 season, Agoro joined Keighley on a two-year contract. At the end of the 2021 season Agoro extended his contract with Keighley for a further two years.

In the 2022 League One season Agoro was the division's top try scorer with 28 tries. He was one of three players nominated for the League One Player of the Year award but lost out to teammate Jack Miller.

=== Oldham RLFC (rejoin) ===
On 27 September 2023 he re-joined Oldham.

=== Hunslet (rejoin) ===
On 24 September 2025 Agoro re-signed for Hunslet.

=== International career ===
Agoro was first selected for the Jamaica national team for the Americas qualifying tournament for the 2017 World Cup and won his first (and to date only) cap as one of the interchange players in the match against United States on 4 December 2015. His first starting appearance came in the same tournament in the 18–all draw with Canada on 8 December. As of October 2024 Agoro has made twelve appearances for Jamaica, most recently in a friendly against Wales in October 2024. In September 2022 Agoro was named in the Jamaica squad for the World Cup to be held in October and November.
