= Lewis Taylor (rugby league) =

Wales international rugby league footballer

Personal information
- Full name: Lewis Taylor

Playing information
- Position: Prop
Club
Years	Team	Pld	T	G	FG	P
≤2004–04	Leeds Rhinos
2004–≥04	Keighley Cougars
	Total	0	0	0	0	0
Representative
Years	Team	Pld	T	G	FG	P
2004	Wales	1

Lewis Taylor (birth unknown) is a professional rugby league footballer who played in the 2000s. He played at representative level for Wales, and at club level for the Leeds Rhinos and the Keighley Cougars, as a prop.

== Background ==
Taylor has worked as a Royal Navy Aircraft Maintenance Technician who trained at HMS Sultan.

== Playing career ==
=== International honours ===
Taylor won a cap for Wales while at Leeds Rhinos in the 22–30 defeat by Scotland at Firhill Stadium, Glasgow, on Wednesday, 24 November 2004.

=== Club career ===
Taylor transferred from the Leeds Rhinos to the Keighley Cougars on 16 December 2004.
