= Nathan Roebuck =

English rugby league footballer

Personal information
- Full name: Nathan Roebuck
- Born: 2 October 1999 (age 26) Oldham, Greater Manchester, England
- Height: 6 ft 5 in (1.95 m)
- Weight: 15 st 2 lb (96 kg)

Playing information
- Position: Wing, Centre
Club
Years	Team	Pld	T	G	FG	P
2020–21	Warrington Wolves	1	1	0	0	4
2021(loan)	→ Leigh Centurions	0	0	0	0	0
2021(loan)	→ Salford Red Devils	0	0	0	0	0
2021(loan)	→ Newcastle Thunder	1	2	0	0	8
2022–23	Keighley Cougars	16	15	0	0	60
2024–	Oldham RLFC	3	2	0	0	8
	Total	21	20	0	0	80
- Source: As of 20 February 2025

Nathan Roebuck (born 2 October 1999) is a professional rugby league footballer who currently plays as a winger or centre for Oldham RLFC in the RFL Championship

== Background ==
Roebuck played his amateur rugby league with the Saddleworth Rangers, mainly as a centre.

== Career ==
=== Warrington Wolves ===
Roebuck made his Super League debut in round 14 of the 2020 Super League season for Warrington against the Salford Red Devils and went on to score a try in the 18th minute.

=== Leigh Centurions (loan) ===
On 17 March 2021, it was reported that he had joined the Leigh Centurions in the Super League on loan.

=== Salford Red Devils (loan) ===
On 8 July 2021, it was reported that he had signed for Salford in the Super League on loan for the remainder of the 2021 season.

=== Keighley Cougars ===
On 19 November 2021, it was reported that he had signed for Keighley in the RFL League 1. On 4 July 2023 it was reported that he had left Keighley Cougars with immediate effect to pursue opportunities outside the sport.

=== Oldham RLFC ===
On 14 June 2024, it was reported that he had signed for Oldham RLFC in the RFL League 1.
