= Keith Pollard (rugby league) =

English rugby league footballer

Personal information
- Full name: Keith Pollard
- Born: 27 June 1946 (age 79) Kingston upon Hull, England

Playing information
- Position: Prop, Hooker
Club
Years	Team	Pld	T	G	FG	P
≤1967–67	Hull Kingston Rovers	20+2	1	0	0	3
1967–71	Keighley	58+5	3	0	0	9
c. 1975	Maitland Pickers	45
1975–76	Kempsey Kowboys	60
1977	Wakefield Trinity	1	0	0	0	0
1977	Doncaster	1	0	0	0	0
	Total	192	4	0	0	12

Keith Pollard (27 June 1946) is an English former professional rugby league footballer who played in the 1960s and 1970s, and coached in the 1970s through to the 2000s. As of December 2018, he is a member of the Hull Kingston Rovers Heritage Committee, which is part of the Hull Kingston Rovers Trust. He played at representative level for the Group 2 Rugby League (2-matches) and North Coast (a combined team of Northern Rivers Regional Rugby League, Group 2 Rugby League and Group 3 Rugby League from the Mid North Coast and New South Wales North Coast regions) (3-matches, two in the Country Rugby League Divisional Competition against Newcastle, and Illawarra and one in the Amco Cup in the 2-44 defeat by Manly Warringah in the 1975 Amco Cup at Lang Park, Brisbane, on Wednesday 16 April 1975), and at club level for the Hull Kingston Rovers, Keighley, the Maitland Pickers (in Maitland, New South Wales, Australia, of the Newcastle Rugby League), the Kempsey Kowboys (in Kempsey, New South Wales, Australia, of the Group 2 Rugby League of Country Rugby League) (captain/player-coach), Hull F.C. (A-Team c. 8-matches, a first-team appearance was prevented by adverse weather), Wakefield Trinity and Doncaster, as a prop or hooker, and coached at club level for Kempsey Kowboys, Hull Dockers A.R.L.F.C. (First team, and Under-18s) and East Hull A.R.L.F.C. (First team jointly with Lee Radford, and Under-18s).

== Background ==
Keith Pollard was born in Kingston upon Hull, East Riding of Yorkshire, England, he has worked as a mechanical estimator, he published his autobiography entitled "Red & White Phoenix - The Adventures Of A Hessle Road Lad" during December 2018, the net proceeds of which go to the Alpha 1-antitrypsin deficiency (A1AD) charity; Alpha-1 UK Support Group, his son Jason had previously died from A1AD, and as of January 2019 he lives in Kingston upon Hull.

== Playing career ==
Keith Pollard signed for Hull Kingston Rovers, during his time at Rovers he went on loan to York RLFC at the end of the 1965 / 6 season and played 6 first team games making his debut against Leeds RLFC at the end of that season he went back to Rovers. he was transferred from Hull Kingston Rovers to Keighley, he made his début for Keighley against Bradford Northern on 30 September 1967, he played his last match for Keighley against Batley at Mount Pleasant, Batley on Saturday 27 February 1971, he relocated to Australia, he signed for the Maitland Pickers where he played alongside future rugby league coach; Peter Sharp, he joined the Maitland Pickers during the 1971 mid-season, he played two third-grade matches, then 14 straight first-grade matches; including first-grade semi-finals and the grand final, in the 1972 season he played 10 first-grade matches and 10 reserve-grade matches, plus reserve-grade semi-finals and grand final, in the 1973 season he played 18 first-grade matches, and 2 reserve-grade matches, plus first-grade semi-finals and grand final for a total of 21 first-grade matches, he signed for the Kempsey Kowboys where he played c. 60-matches as captain/player-coach, he played alongside John Mayew, during the 1975 season he played the full season, playing a total of 20-matches including the major semi-final and the grand final, during the 1976 season he missed 4-matches through injury, playing a total of 18-matches including the major semi-final and the grand final, he returned to the United Kingdom, he signed for Hull F.C., he transferred from Hull F.C. to Wakefield Trinity, he made his début for Wakefield Trinity during February 1977, he played his last match for Wakefield Trinity during the 1976–77 season, he was transferred from the Wakefield Trinity to Doncaster where he played one match against Keighley at Lawkholme Lane, Keighley during 1977.

== Coaching career ==
Keith Pollard coached at Kempsey Kowboys from 1975 to 1976, coached Hull Dockers A.R.L.F.C. c. 1996, and coached East Hull A.R.L.F.C. (jointly with Lee Radford) from the Yorkshire League to the National Conference League c. 2000.
