= Roy Sabine =

English rugby league footballer and coach

Personal information
- Born: England

Playing information

Rugby union
- Position: Centre
Representative
Years	Team	Pld	T	G	FG	P
≤1962–≥62	"The Dukes"

Rugby league
- Position: Stand-off
Club
Years	Team	Pld	T	G	FG	P
≤1959–≥62	Keighley	175
Representative
Years	Team	Pld	T	G	FG	P
1963	Yorkshire	2	1	0	0	3

Coaching information
Club
Years	Team	Gms	W	D	L	W%
≤1976–≥76	Keighley

Roy Sabine (birth unknown) is an English former rugby union and professional rugby league footballer who played in the 1950s and 1960s, and coached rugby league in the 1970s. He played rugby union (RU) for Duke of Wellington's Regiment ("The Dukes"), as a centre, and representative level rugby league (RL) for Yorkshire, and at club level for Keighley, as a stand-off, and coached at club level for Keighley. Roy Sabine served as a Private with the Duke of Wellington's Regiment.

== Coaching career ==
Roy Sabine coached Keighley to the 1976 Challenge Cup semi-final during the 1975–76 season against St. Helens at Fartown Ground, Huddersfield on Saturday 3 April 1976.

== Honoured at Keighley Cougars ==
Roy Sabine is a Keighley Cougars Hall of Fame inductee, he was inducted in 1999 alongside Len Ward.
