= Harry Myers (rugby) =

England international rugby union & league footballer (1875–1906)

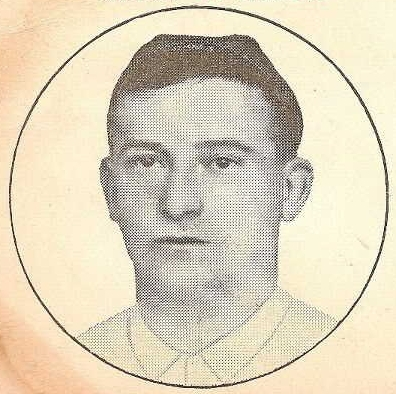

Personal information
- Born: 3 February 1875 Horsforth, Leeds, England
- Died: 19 December 1906 (aged 31) Keighley, England

Playing information

Rugby union
- Position: Fly-half
Club
Years	Team	Pld	T	G	FG	P
1893–94	Horsforth
1894–96	Bramley
1896–1900	Keighley		49	120
	Total	0	49	120	0	0
Representative
Years	Team	Pld	T	G	FG	P
1898	England	1	0	0	0	0
1895–99	Yorkshire	27
1898	The North	1

Rugby league
- Position: Halfback
Club
Years	Team	Pld	T	G	FG	P
1900–06	Keighley		77	41		313
Representative
Years	Team	Pld	T	G	FG	P
1903	Yorkshire	1	0	0	0	0

Harry Myers (3 February 1875 – 19 December 1906) from Horsforth, Leeds was a Rugby Union and later Northern Union (rugby league) footballer who played in the 1890s and 1900s. He played rugby union for Horsforth, Bramley and Keighley and played one international match for England as well representative rugby for Yorkshire. In 1900 he changed codes to play rugby league (then known as Northern Union football). He died in 1906 after an accident during a game for Keighley against Dewsbury.

== Playing career ==
=== Rugby Union ===
Myers first played rugby for Horsforth whom he joined part way through the 1893–4 season. At the end of that season he joined Bramley for who he played for the next two seasons. Making his debut for Bramley against Werenth on 1 September 1894 he scored his first try for the club against Bowling Old Lane on 8 September 1894. In 1896 before the start of the 1896–7 season the Bramley club decided to change codes and join the Northern Rugby Union where professionalism i.e. payments to players was allowed. Myers did not wish to become a professional player so he left Bramley and opted to join Keighley instead, his resignation from Bramley being noted by the Yorkshire Rugby Football Union the same week.

Myers arrival at Keighley coincided with an upturn in the club's fortunes and in the next four seasons the club won the Yorkshire No.2 Competition, with promotion to the No.1 competition, and after twice finishing runners-up the club won the No.1 competition in 1899–1900. During these four seasons Myers had been appointed captain of the team and had scored 49 tries as well as kicking 120 goals. His abilities were also recognised by the rugby union and he was selected to play for Yorkshire on a number of occasions in the County Championship. First selected for Yorkshire against Durham in November 1895, Myers played in every Yorkshire game for three consecutive seasons; 1895–6, 1896–7 and 1897–8.

He was capped once by England playing in the 6–9 defeat by Ireland at Athletic Ground, Richmond, London on Saturday 5 February 1898. He was also selected to play for the North against the South in February 1898. With 27 appearances for Yorkshire and one for England, Myers has the most representative appearances by a Keighley player in rugby union and the only Keighley player to play for England.

In October 1898 press reports appeared that Myers had resigned from Keighley and was crossing codes to rejoin Bramley. Myers was asked to attend before the Yorkshire rugby union committee, but after explaining that he had been approached by Bramley and had rebuffed all offers made, the committee accepted that he was not guilty of professionalism.

=== Change of code ===
In April 1900, only days after being presented with the Yorkshire Rugby Union cup for winning the No.1 competition the Keighley club voted to leave the Rugby Union and join the Northern Rugby Union. This time Myers did decide to move codes and along with the rest of the Keighley team he voted in favour of the move.

=== Northern Union ===
Myers kicked the first points scored by Keighley as a Northern Union team when he kicked a drop goal in the club's first game under Northern Union rules against Manningham on 14 April 1900 - just two days after the club vote to change codes.

Keighley were admitted into the Northern Union on 12 June 1900 and in August 1900 were placed in the west division of the Yorkshire Second Competition Myers captained the side for the next six seasons including fifth place in the league in 1905–6 and reaching the semi-finals of the Challenge Cup in the same season. Myers personal tally was 77 tries and 41 goals and in six seasons his longest absence from the side was six weeks recovering from a broken collar bone.

In April 1902 he played in the Yorkshire Senior Competition season-closing match between the league champions, Leeds and a team drawn from the rest of the competition - The Rest - and scored a try in a game won 7–5 by Leeds at Headingley Stadium.

Selected to play in the Yorkshire trial match, Possibles v Probables, in October 1902 Myers was subsequently selected as reserve for the county side but he informed the committee that unless he was a member of the team he was not playing for the county at all; he was not selected. Despite this he did earn one county cap, against Durham and Northumberland in April 1903.

In 1904 Myers was awarded a benefit game by Keighley and the game chosen was the match against his old club Bramley on 15 October 1904, Keighley won the game and the gate earning totalled £54/7/3 which was passed to Myers.

== Death ==
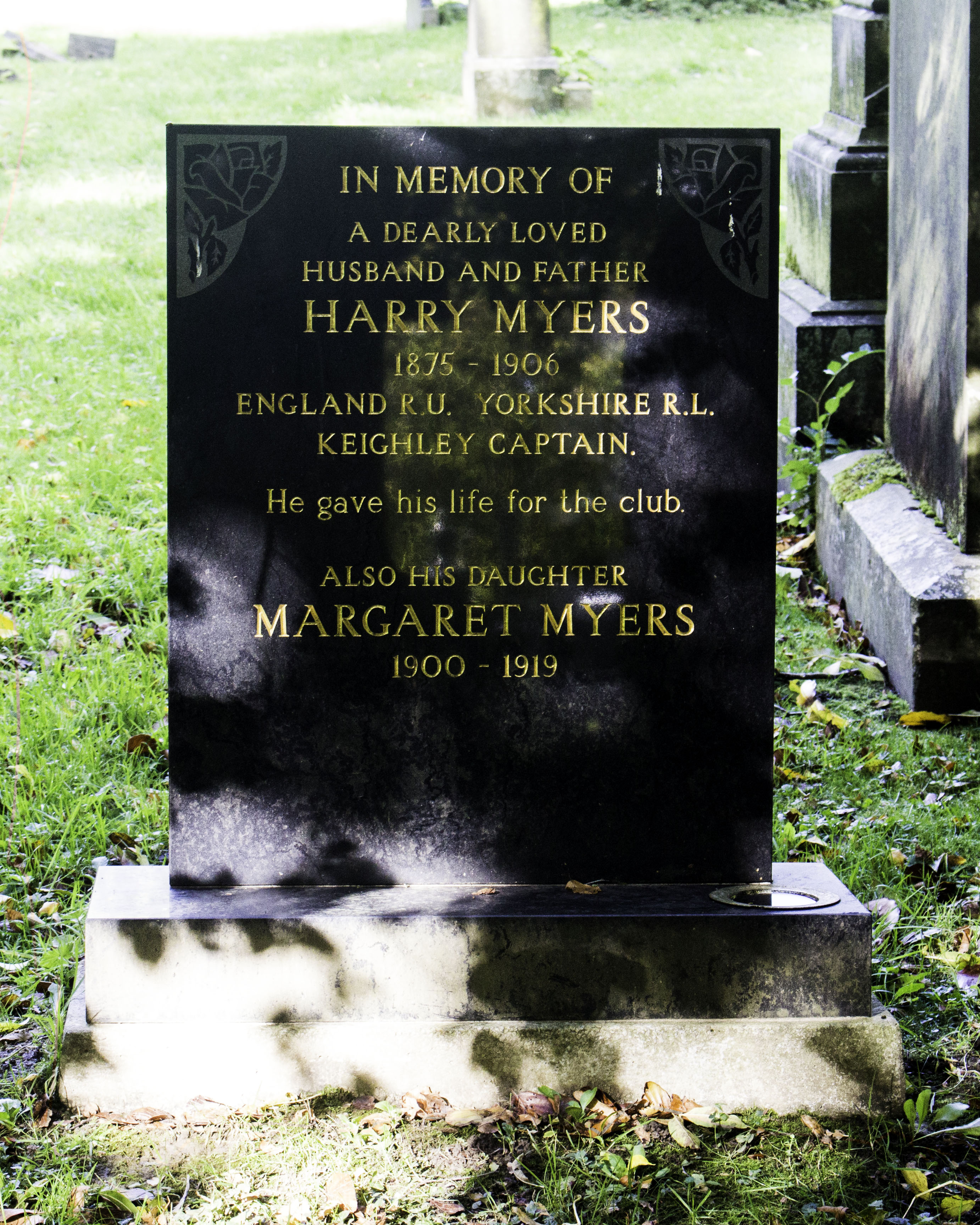
Myers' headstone in Utley Cemetery

On 3 November 1906 Keighley played Dewsbury at Crown Flatt. Late in the first half Myers recovered a loose ball and was running head-down towards the Dewsbury goal line when he collided with Fred Richardson, one of the Dewsbury forwards. Myers' head hit Richardson's shoulder and both fell over. Richardson was bruised but was able to regain his feet but Myers remained unconscious on the ground. Myers was carried to the dressing room where a doctor examined him and recommended that he be taken to hospital. Myers was taken to Dewsbury Infirmary, conscious on arrival he complained of pain in the neck and was unable to move his arms or legs. The doctors who assessed him were sure there were severe spinal injuries but due to swellings at the site of the injury they could not confirm the full nature of the injury. X-rays detected no fracture of the spine and the doctors concluded that the paralysis was caused by an internal haemorrhage putting pressure on the spine. The injury also made breathing difficult. Myers was able to talk and one of his first actions was to absolve Richardson of any fault for the incident and that it was solely an accident.

Such was the interest in Myers' condition that daily bulletins about his condition were released and reported in many local papers across the North of England. On 6 December he was transferred to Keighley and District Victoria Hospital to be closer to his family. Further examination, once the swelling had reduced, showed that there was a fracture between the sixth and seventh cervical vertebrae with complete severing of the spinal cord. It had already been concluded that there would be no recovery from the injuries but his condition remained unchanged until 18 December when his condition deteriorated and he died in the evening of 19 December 1906.

The jury at the subsequent inquest, held at Keighley Police Station on 21 December 1906, returned a verdict of accidental death. The coroner, Edgar Wood, concluded that "there did not seem to blame attached to anyone" and "that Harry Myers, on Saturday Nov. 3rd 1906, while playing a game of Rugby football on the Crown Flatts ground, Dewsbury, collided suddenly with another player and sustained a fracture, dislocation of the back, and laceration of the spinal cord, resulting in death on the 19th inst. at the Victoria Hospital, Keighley."

Myers' funeral was held on 23 December 1906. The funeral procession marched from the Worth Valley Hotel at Ingrow to Keighley Parish Church where the service was conducted by the Reverend H. J. Palmer, Rector of Keighley. Myers was buried in Utley cemetery and it was estimated that over 10,000 people lined the route of the procession.

== Personal life ==
Myers married Ada Winstanley in December 1898 and they had four children. Originally employed in the textile trade, from 1901 Myers was manager of the Fleece Inn in Keighley and in 1903 he became the licensee of the nearby Brunswick Arms in Keighley. In April 1906 he took over the licence of the Worth Valley Hotel in Ingrow and it was here that he and his family resided at the time of his death. After his death Ada took over the licence.

== See also ==
- List of rugby league players who died during matches
