= Frank Townsend (rugby league) =

English rugby league footballer

Personal information
- Full name: Frank Walton Townsend
- Born: 16 April 1925; Wakefield, England
- Died: 28 September 1946 (aged 21); Featherstone, England

Playing information
- Height: 5 ft 10.5 in (1.8 m)
- Weight: 12 st 4 lb (78.0 kg)
- Position: Centre
Club
Years	Team	Pld	T	G	FG	P
1945–46	Wakefield Trinity	43	13	0	0	39

Frank Walton Townsend (16 April 1925 – 28 September 1946) was an English professional rugby league footballer who played in the 1940s. He played for Wakefield Trinity as a centre. After signing for Wakefield in January 1945, he made regular appearances during the 1945–1946 and 1946–1947 seasons scoring 13 tries in 39 appearances. On 28 September 1946 he was fatally injured in a match against Featherstone Rovers at Post Office Road, Featherstone during the 1946–47 season. Townsend was injured in a tackle and was helped off the field. He was later taken to hospital, unconscious, where he died of a brain haemorrhage.

His father, Harry "Chick" Townsend, had also played for Wakefield after the First World War.

== See also ==
- List of rugby league players who died during matches
