= John Davies (rugby, born 1941) =

Wales international rugby union & league footballer (1941–1969)

Personal information
- Full name: David John Davies
- Born: 20 February 1941 Neath, Wales
- Died: 15 April 1969 (aged 28) Dewsbury, West Riding of Yorkshire, England

Playing information
- Height: 6 ft 1 in (185 cm)

Rugby union
- Position: Flanker
Club
Years	Team	Pld	T	G	FG	P
≤1962–≥62	Neath RFC
	Llanelli RFC
	Total	0	0	0	0	0
Representative
Years	Team	Pld	T	G	FG	P
1962	Wales	1	0	0	0	0

Rugby league
Club
Years	Team	Pld	T	G	FG	P
	Leeds
≤1969–69	Dewsbury
	Total	0	0	0	0	0

David John Davies (20 February 1941 – 15 April 1969) was a Welsh rugby union, and professional rugby league footballer who played in the 1960s. He played representative level rugby union (RU) for Wales, and at club level for Neath RFC, as a flanker, and club level rugby league (RL) for Leeds and Dewsbury.

== Background ==
John Davies was born in Neath, Wales, and a physical education teacher at Foxwood School, Seacroft, Leeds from 1963 until 1969. He suffered a suspected heart attack shortly after being stretchered from the field in the Heavy Woollen District local derby, during Dewsbury's 8–7 victory over Batley at Crown Flatt, Dewsbury on Tuesday 15 April 1969. He died aged 28 on the way to hospital in Dewsbury, West Riding of Yorkshire, England. The coroner returned an open verdict as he could not be sure that an injury sustained in a match two years earlier did not have some effect on Davies's health.

== Playing career ==
=== International honours ===
John Davies won a cap for Wales (RU) while at Neath RFC in 1962 against Ireland.

== See also ==
- List of rugby league players who died during matches
