= Bert Cook (rugby) =

New Zealand rugby league footballer and coach

Personal information
- Full name: Herbert Errol Cook
- Born: 24 December 1923; Wairoa, New Zealand
- Died: 19 December 1986 (aged 62); Leeds, England

Playing information

Rugby union
Representative
Years	Team	Pld	T	G	FG	P
1945–46	2nd NZEF "Kiwis"	20				138

Rugby league
- Position: Fullback
Club
Years	Team	Pld	T	G	FG	P
1947–53	Leeds	210	19	556	0	1169
1953–≥53	Keighley
≤1958–58	Dewsbury
	Total	210	19	556	0	1169
Representative
Years	Team	Pld	T	G	FG	P
≥1947–≤58	Other Nationalities

Coaching information
Club
Years	Team	Gms	W	D	L	W%
1953–≥53	Keighley
≤1958–58	Dewsbury
	Total	0	0	0	0

Herbert Errol Cook (24 December 1923 – 19 December 1986) was a New Zealand rugby union and professional rugby league footballer who played in the 1940s and 1950s, and coached rugby league in the 1950s. He played representative level rugby union (RU) for 2nd New Zealand Expeditionary Force "Kiwis", and representative level rugby league (RL) for Other Nationalities, and at club level for Leeds, Keighley and Dewsbury, as a goal-kicking fullback, and coached club level rugby league (RL) for Keighley and Dewsbury.
