= Brian Jefferson =

England international rugby league & union player

Personal information
- Full name: Brian Jefferson
- Born: unknown England

Playing information

Rugby union
Club
Years	Team	Pld	T	G	FG	P
≤1967–≥67	Moortown RUFC

Rugby league
- Position: Fullback
Club
Years	Team	Pld	T	G	FG	P
1965–77	Keighley					2116
Representative
Years	Team	Pld	T	G	FG	P
1971–74	Yorkshire	7	2	30		66
1968	England	1	0	0	0	0

Brian Jefferson (birth unknown), also known by the nickname of "Bootsie", is an English former rugby union, and professional rugby league footballer who played in the 1960s and 1970s. He played club level rugby union (RU) for Moortown RUFC (in Moortown, Leeds), and representative level rugby league (RL) for England and Yorkshire, and at club level for Keighley, as a fullback.

== Background ==
Brian Jefferson was a pupil at Blenheim School, Woodhouse, Leeds in c. 1957.

== Playing career ==
=== Career records ===
Jefferson holds Keighley's "Most points a career" record with 2,116-points scored over 13-seasons.

=== Testimonial match ===
Jefferson's Testimonial match at Keighley took place in 1977.

=== International honours ===
Jefferson won a cap for England (RL) while at Keighley in 1968 against Wales.
