= Jordan Ross (rugby league) =

Wales international rugby league footballer

Personal information
- Full name: Jordan Ross
- Born: 25 October 1984 (age 41) Keighley, West Yorkshire, England

Playing information
- Position: Second-row
Club
Years	Team	Pld	T	G	FG	P
2004–05	Keighley Cougars	11	0	0	0	0
2006	Rochdale Hornets	2	0	0	0	0
2009–10	York City Knights	41	3	0	0	12
	Total	54	3	0	0	12
Representative
Years	Team	Pld	T	G	FG	P
2010	Wales	3	0	0	0	0

Jordan Ross (born 25 October 1984) is a former Wales international rugby league footballer who played in the 2000s and 2010s. He played as a second-row forward at club level for the Keighley Cougars, Rochdale Hornets and the York City Knights.

== Playing career ==
In 2010, he helped York City Knights earn promotion to the Championship, playing in the 25–4 victory against Oldham in the Championship One Grand Final. He left the club at the end of the season and moved to Australia.

=== International honours ===
Jordan Ross won caps for Wales while at York City Knights in 2010.
