= 2022 RFL League 1 =

2022 rugby league competition in the United Kingdom

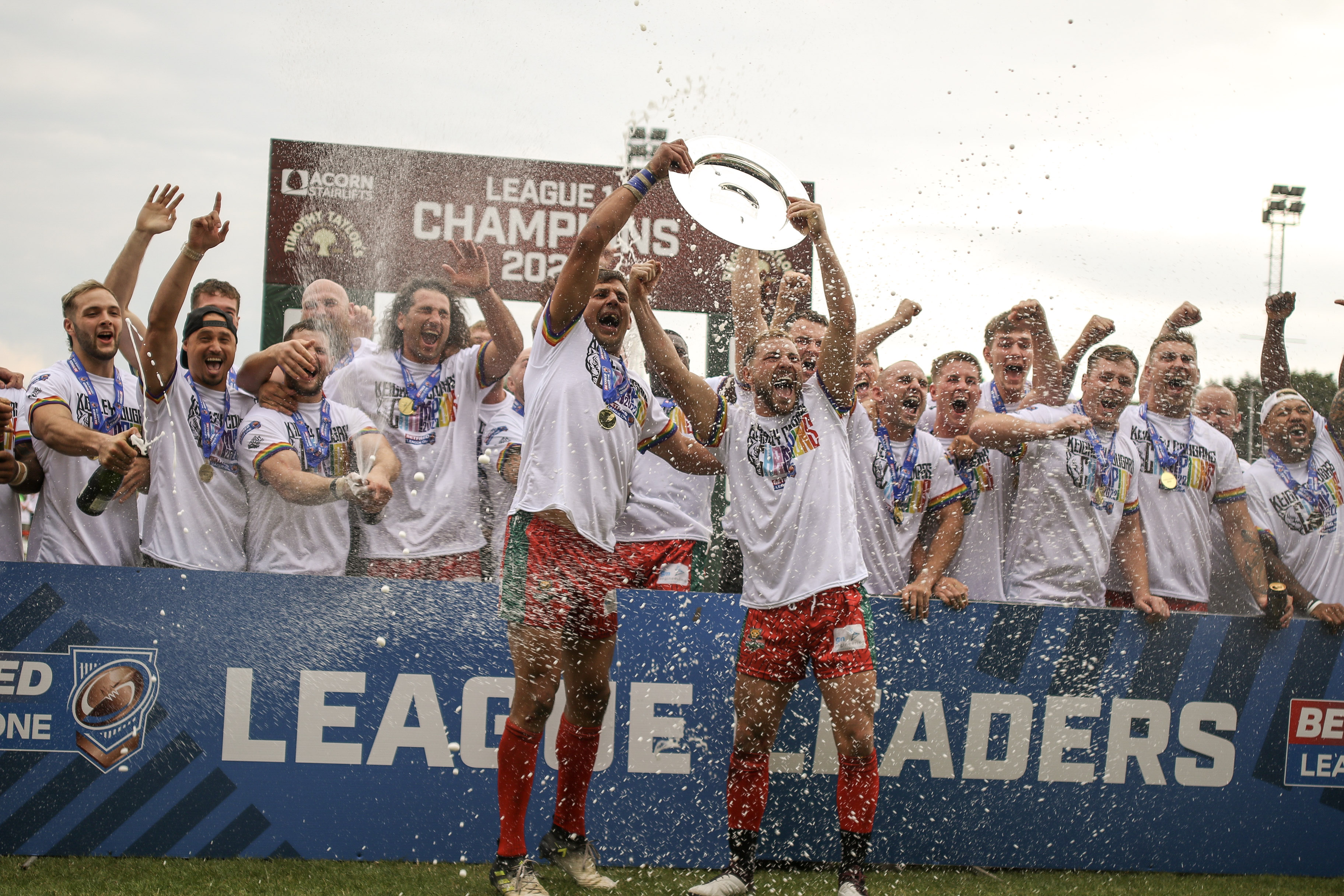
- The 2022 season was won by Keighley Cougars
- League: League 1
- Duration: 26 March 2022 – 2 October 2022
- Teams: 11
- Matches played: 114
- Points scored: 6,807
- Highest attendance: 2,712; Keighley Cougars v North Wales Crusaders (28 August 2022)
- Lowest attendance: 168; Midlands Hurricanes v West Wales Raiders (5 June 2022)
- Average attendance: 718
- Attendance: 81,919
- Champions: Keighley Cougars
- League Leaders: Keighley Cougars
- Also promoted: Swinton Lions
- Biggest home win: 102–4; Rochdale Hornets v West Wales Raiders (28 August 2022)
- Biggest away win: 6–94; West Wales Raiders v Swinton Lions (13 August 2022)
- Top point-scorer: Jack Miller (Keighley Cougars) (338)
- Top try-scorer: Mo Agoro (Keighley Cougars) (28)
- Expansion team: Cornwall

The 2022 RFL League 1 is a professional rugby league football competition played in the United Kingdom and is the third tier of the sport for Rugby Football League (RFL) affiliated clubs. The sponsors for the league are the bookmakers, Betfred and the league will continue to be known as the Betfred League 1.

The league was won by the Keighley Cougars who clinched the title after round 20 having won all 18 of their games to that point. The Cougars went on to win all 20 matches and become only the fourth team in the European game to complete a perfect season. (Note: The first club to register a perfect season were Hull F.C. in the 1978–79 season. The feat was repeated by Dewsbury Rams in 2009 and Toulouse Olympique in 2021.) Cougars' players also topped all the regular season point scoring totals with Mo Agoro being the divisions top try-scorer with 28 and Jack Miller topping the goal-scoring table with 133 goals as well as heading the points-scoring table with 338 points. Overall Swinton's Dan Abram was the leading goal-scorer with 139 goals in the regular season and the play-offs.

Swinton Lions won the promotion play off final 16–10, to earn an immediate return to the Championship, after being relegated the previous season.

Total attendances for the season were 81,919 while the average attendance for regular season games was 711. The average attendance was an increase of 79 per game compared to the 2019 season (the last full season with no restrictions due to COVID-19).

== Rule changes ==
The RFL approved three rules changes for 2022. On 20 January 2022, The RFL confirmed that scrums would return to all competitions, having been suspended as part of the game's COVID-19 response in 2020 and 2021. Scrums are only being reintroduced for errors (knock-on, forward pass or accidental offside) in the first four tackles of a set. Other cases, where previously a scrum would have been awarded, for example - ball into touch on the full, ball kicked or passed into touch, incorrect play the ball; will result in a handover.

The ball steal law will revert to the 2020 rule where the ball can only be stolen in a one-on-one tackle and not during a multi-person tackle where the additional tacklers have peeled off the tackle before the steal. Finally, injured players will be required to leave the pitch for treatment, if possible, following complaints that stoppages for injury spoil the speed and flow of the game.

== Teams ==
2022 was due to see the second professional rugby league team in Canada, Ottawa Aces, join League 1 and increase the number of teams in the division to 11. However, in October 2021 the company behind the Ottawa club announced that due to the COVID-19 pandemic, the club would relocate to the United Kingdom. The following month, the club's new home and name were announced with the team to be called Cornwall RLFC and be based in Penryn, Cornwall.

Also in October 2021, Coventry Bears was rebranded as Midlands Hurricanes and would for 2022 be leaving Butts Park Arena in Coventry to play at Birmingham & Solihull R.F.C.'s Portway ground south of Birmingham.

Oldham, who were relegated from the Championship, relocated to the Vestacare Stadium for 2022.

=== Stadiums and locations ===
Locations of the 2022 RFL League 1 teams

Team	Location	Stadium	Capacity
Cornwall RLFC	Penryn, Cornwall	The Memorial Ground	4,000
Doncaster	Doncaster	Eco-Power Stadium	15,231
Hunslet	Leeds	South Leeds Stadium	4,000
Keighley Cougars	Keighley	Cougar Park	7,800
London Skolars	Haringey, London	New River Stadium	2,000
Midlands Hurricanes	Birmingham	Portway Stadium	2,000
North Wales Crusaders	Colwyn Bay	Eirias Stadium	5,500
Oldham	Oldham	Whitebank Stadium	1,500
Rochdale Hornets	Rochdale	Spotland Stadium	10,249
Swinton Lions	Sale, Greater Manchester	Heywood Road	3,387
West Wales Raiders	Llanelli	Stebonheath Park	3,700

== Fixtures and results ==
The season comprised 22 rounds with each of the 11 teams playing each other home and away. Each team had 20 fixtures and byes in two rounds. The fixture list was released on 13 November 2021. Promotion was confirmed with two clubs to be promoted to the 2023 Championship.

The round 5 fixture between West Wales and Doncaster was forfeited by West Wales when the Welsh club failed to arrange the necessary medical cover. Under RFL operational rules the match was awarded to Doncaster as a 48–0 win. For the same reason, London Skolars forfeited the round 14 match against Keighley Cougars; the match being recorded as a 48–0 win for Keighley.

The 108 fixtures played saw a total of 6,413 points scored and attendance was 77,814 (average 721 per game). The six play-off matches added 298 points and 3,882 to the attendances.

== Regular season table ==
Pos	Team	Pld	W	D	L	PF	PA	PD	Pts	Qualification
1	Keighley Cougars	20	20	0	0	989	194	+795	40	Champions & promoted to Championship
2	Swinton Lions	20	16	0	4	834	317	+517	32	Advance to qualifying semi-final
3	North Wales Crusaders	20	15	0	5	708	420	+288	30	Advance to qualifying play-off
4	Doncaster	20	15	0	5	720	434	+286	30	Advance to qualifying play-off
5	Rochdale Hornets	20	13	0	7	772	511	+261	26	Advance to elimination play-off
6	Oldham	20	8	1	11	571	526	+45	17	Advance to elimination play-off
7	Hunslet	20	8	1	11	513	524	−11	17	
8	Midlands Hurricanes	20	6	0	14	546	696	−150	12	
9	London Skolars	20	6	0	14	440	827	−387	12	
10	Cornwall	20	1	0	19	276	864	−588	2	
11	West Wales Raiders	20	1	0	19	140	1196	−1056	2	

== Play-offs ==
The play-offs used the same structure used since 2019 with the team finishing first gaining automatic promotion and the teams finishing second to sixth competing in a four-round play-off series with one other team gaining promotion.

=== Team bracket ===
Qualifying & elimination play-offs
3	North Wales Crusaders	12
4	Doncaster	26
5	Rochdale Hornets	38
6	Oldham	24

Semi-finals
2	Swinton Lions	32
Doncaster	12
North Wales Crusaders	20
Rochdale Hornets	36

Preliminary final
Doncaster	52
Rochdale Hornets	20

Promotion play-off final
Swinton Lions	16
Doncaster	10

=== Summary ===
Elimination & Qualifying play-offs
Match	Home	Score	Away	Match Information
Match	Home	Score	Away	Date and Time	Venue	Referee	Attendance
QPO	North Wales Crusaders	12–26	Doncaster	11 September 2022, 14:30	Eirias Stadium	N. Bennett	345
EPO	Rochdale Hornets	38–24	Oldham	11 September 2022, 13:00	Spotland Stadium	A. Moore	735

Semi-finals
Match	Home	Score	Away	Match Information
Match	Home	Score	Away	Date and Time	Venue	Referee	Attendance
QSF	Swinton Lions	32–12	Doncaster	18 September 2022; 15:00	Heywood Road	A. Moore	781
ESF	North Wales Crusaders	20–36	Rochdale Hornets	17 September 2022, 17:30	Eirias Stadium	J. Vella	307

Preliminary Final
Home	Score	Away	Match Information
Home	Score	Away	Date and Time	Venue	Referee	Attendance
Doncaster	52–20	Rochdale Hornets	25 September 2022, 15:00	Eco-Power Stadium	T. Grant	628

Play-off Final
Home	Score	Away	Match Information
Home	Score	Away	Date and Time	Venue	Referee	Attendance
Swinton Lions	16–10	Doncaster	2 October 2022, 15:00	Heywood Road	J. Vella	1,086

== End of season awards ==
The League One awards were made on 26 September. Four awards were made:

- Club of the year: Keighley Cougars
- Coach of the year: Rhys Lovegrove (Keighley Cougars)
- Young player of the year: George Roby (Swinton Lions)
- Player of the year: Jack Miller (Keighley Cougars)
