= Keighley Cougars =

English rugby league club

Club information
- Full name: Keighley Cougars Rugby League Football Club
- Nickname: Cougars
- Colours: Red, white and green
- Founded: 1876; 150 years ago
- Website: keighleycougars.uk/

Current details
- Ground: Cougar Park
- Chairman: Ryan O'Neill, Kaue Garcia
- Coach: Matt Bramald
- Captain: tbc
- Competition: Championship
- 2026 season: 16th
- Current season

The Keighley Cougars are a professional rugby league club from Keighley in West Yorkshire, England. The club play home games at Cougar Park and compete in the Championship, the second tier of British rugby league.

Keighley have never won a major honour. Their main rivals are Bradford Bulls.

== History ==
=== Early years ===
Crest used by Keighley prior to 1991

The club was formed at a meeting held on 17 October 1876 under the presidency of the Reverend Marriner. A committee was elected and the club was allowed the use of Holmes' field in Lawkholme Lane.

The first kick-off took place on Saturday afternoon, 21 October and the committee met again on 24 October and decided to adopt Association and Rugby football laws. On 18 November 1876, the first game took place at Lawkholme Lane. The visitors were Crosshills and although the game ended in a draw, there are records, which say, "the draw was in the visitors' favour".

The first important match appears to have been played on 13 January 1877 against Bingley. Under the scoring system of the day, the visitors won by two tries and two touchdowns to two touchdowns. One of the earliest games of the following season was a fixture with Kildwick on 13 October 1877 when Keighley won by one goal to five touchdowns. Other teams met during that second season were Bradford Zingari, Manningham, Cleckheaton, Leeds Athletic, Skipton and Bradford Juniors. Up to April 1878, Keighley and Bingley had met seven times with Keighley losing every match.

At the annual meeting of the club in 1878, shortly after the headquarters had been moved to Dalton Lane, a second XV was formed. Keighley Athletic were formed on 27 October 1879. There was some rivalry with those who had set up the new club, but a couple of years later these differences had been settled, and on 24 March 1881 a merger was agreed between the two clubs.

Keighley officially joined the Rugby Football Union on Tuesday, 8 April 1879, and the following year, in a match at Bingley, there was a peculiar incident. A report of the game states that Bradbury attempted a drop goal, but the ball passed under the crossbar, and Bairstow, following up, touched down. Bingley would not concede the try, alleging that the player who obtained it was offside, and due to their refusal to allow the ball to be brought out, the home players left the field and the game was unfinished.

By the end of season 1880–81, the membership of the club was 80; ten honorary members and 70 playing members. In 1882–83 "the team had a most successful experience". Gate receipts reached £58 and expenditure was £32.

In March 1882, the team figured in the Yorkshire Cup for the first time. They met Wakefield Trinity, who were one of the top sides. During that year, a match with Hunslet F.C. was played under Association rules which ended in a draw. It may be the only Association game ever played by the town's club.

In April 1885, the club merged with Keighley Cricket and Football Club, and from that time the club played on the Lawkholme Lane ground. Soon membership had risen to 300 and dressing rooms and headquarters were established at the Black Horse Hotel. The first game at Lawkholme took place on 10 October 1885, against Liversedge. The club's fixture list was improved and in 1886–87 played clubs such as Hipperholme and Lightcliffe, Bramley, Otley, York, Shipley, Ossett, Bingley, Pudsey, Halifax Free Wanderers, Morley, Skipton and Hunslet.

The club reached one of its best seasons in 1892–93 when the team figured in several rounds of the cup and won no less than 22 matches during the season. Leagues were being formed about this time and in 1893–94 Keighley had a try at the Intermediate Competition and finished sixth with a record of eleven wins and eleven defeats. The following season the club did badly and finished tenth, but in 1895–96, the side came into its own again and finished fourth.

Success came Keighley's way in 1896–97 when they won the Second Competition championship. The final match of the competition took place at Mytholmroyd on the 3 April 1897, and despite a bitterly cold day there was a gate of 2,000 of which over half had travelled from Keighley. Keighley won 6–3. This heralded a run of success which saw them win the First Competition championship in 1899–1900 after having been runners-up the two preceding years.

=== Northern Union ===
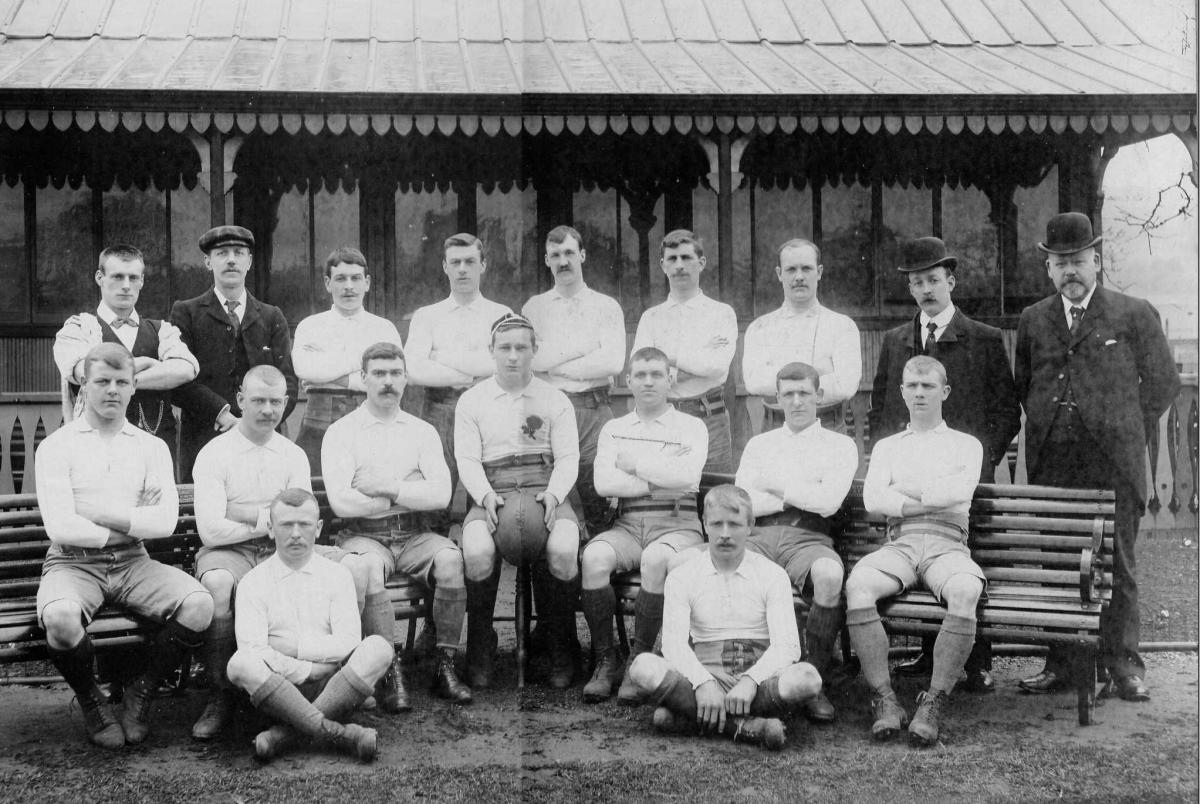
Keighley FC team, c. 1900

On 12 April 1900, Keighley Rugby Union Club decided to apply for membership of the Northern Union. Two days after deciding to change to rugby league, Keighley played Manningham, in the first ever rugby league match at Lawkholme Lane; Manningham won 5–2.

Keighley were elected into the Yorkshire Second Competition on 14 July 1900.

They finished in second place and the following season became members of the Yorkshire Senior Competition as fourteen of the leading clubs broke away from the two County Leagues, to form a new Northern Rugby League.

In March 1901, Keighley entered the Northern Union Cup (now known as the Challenge Cup) for the first time. They beat Kinsley before meeting York. Keighley refused £120 to transfer the tie, and despite a sending-off, earned a 5–5 draw in front of a crowd of 5,293. In the replay York had a player sent off but won 12–0.

In 1902–03, the Lancashire and Yorkshire leagues were combined to form a second division. Keighley was one of the new clubs to join the second division, which they topped with 27 wins out of 34 games and were promoted.

Keighley had their greatest cup season up to that time. They reached the semi-final of the Challenge Cup for the first time by beating Castleford, Egremont, Hull F.C. and Featherstone Rovers before falling to Salford in the semi-final at Warrington. An old newspaper clipping says that "dissatisfaction among the players with regard to terms of payment was the reason for this defeat, and but for this very discreditable piece of business Keighley would have opposed Bradford in the final".

On 19 December 1906, tragedy overtook the club when Harry Myers died as a result of an accident on the field of play. About that time Keighley were one of the leading teams in the Challenge Cup and again in 1907–08 they advanced to the third round by virtue of wins over Brookland Rovers and Whitehaven.

During the years of the First World War the club arranged no fixtures and did not take part in the 1918–19 season. When the game returned to normal there was a hectic period of team rebuilding, and following a really bad season in 1921, six new players were signed from the Furness district.

The 1925–26 season was memorable for a first round Challenge Cup tie with Bradford Northern which had to be replayed twice. The aggregate attendance for those three games was nearly 47,000 and the total gate receipts of £3,043 constituted a record for a first round tie.

The club became a limited company in 1929, but failed to make any immediate improvement. During the 1930s, Keighley began to make progress. Major Norman Harrison, the club secretary/manager, was responsible for signing a side that was to reach great heights.

=== 1930s and 1940s ===
The big coup in 1932, when Ted Spillane, the New Zealand halfback signed for the side. That season saw hundreds of lost supporters return and gates reached unprecedented heights. The result was that the directors launched a big scheme of ground improvements. The new stand and improvements were opened on 9 September 1933 when Leeds were the visitors to Lawkholme, and though that particular match was lost the season was to be a notable one.

With such fine forwards as Harold "Hal" Jones and George Dixon from Wigan, and Jimmy Gill from Leeds, already having joined Keighley during their period of revival, there came more important signings in the latter part of the 1930s.

Keighley played in their first and so far only Challenge Cup final in 1937. Having beaten Hunslet, Broughton Rangers, Liverpool Stanley in earlier rounds they played Wakefield Trinity in the semi-final. The first semi-final, held in Leeds on the third of April, was a scoreless draw, but four days later at Huddersfield, Keighley beat Wakefield Trinity 5–3. However, Widnes won the final 18–5.

After their Wembley appearance, Keighley again suffered a decline. In November 1938, they were at the top of the Rugby League table, for the first time ever, for a spell of three weeks, but this form was not maintained and they finished 16th with 17 wins, 17 defeats and two draws.

The main reason for the club's decline was that veterans were not replaced quickly enough, and the one promising young player, Reggie Lloyd, was transferred to Castleford in 1938. In the season after Wembley, Keighley were 13th in the league table. This was to be the last season of competitive peacetime rugby before the Second World War.

During the war years many young players were naturally called into the armed forces. The Rugby League decided to form the Lancashire and Yorkshire Emergency Leagues at the beginning of the 1939–40 season. A system of "guest" players was introduced the following season, some players who guested for Keighley include Jim Sullivan, Les "Cowboy" Jones, and Mel De Lloyd. Keighley and Bradford Northern became regular cup-tie opponents during the war years.

In season 1941–42 Keighley lost both legs in the first round of the Challenge Cup, but got their revenge a year later when they triumphed home and away in the second round of the same competition.

On 13 November 1943, Keighley won the first leg of the Yorkshire Cup semi-final at Lawkholme Lane against Huddersfield 21–0. Although Keighley lost the second leg at Fartown 13–4 and they qualified for the final on aggregate. Keighley played Bradford Northern in the final. This as well, was a two-legged affair with Northern just coming out the better overall. They achieved a slender 5–2 advantage in the first leg at Odsal Stadium, and held Keighley to a 5–5 draw in the return encounter at Lawkholme Lane a week later. That second leg attracted Keighley's biggest wartime 'gate' of 9,487 (£694).

Keighley again met Northern in the second round of the Challenge Cup later the same season. They lost both home and away. And in the 1944–45 season the sides met in the third round of the Challenge Cup when Northern comfortably won on aggregate (35–8) after Keighley had established a 5–0 advantage in the first leg at Lawkholme Lane.

=== Post war ===
Guest players who had played for Keighley during the war years returned to their own clubs when regular competition was resumed in 1945. There were also a number of local players who had joined the club during the war years who blossomed into notable members of the senior side. Keighley finished sixth from the bottom of the league table.

On 14 February 1948, Keighley were the victims of one of the biggest Challenge Cup upsets when they were defeated 2–10 by Cumbrian junior club, Risehow and Gillhead. Fortunately for Keighley they had established an 11–0 lead in the first leg of first round at Lawkholme Lane, though they only scraped home on aggregate by a matter of three points. Prop-forward Chris Brereton became player-coach on 15 June 1948.

Keighley's highest attendance was set at 14,500 for the Challenge Cup clash against Halifax on 3 March 1951. For the second time in their history, Keighley reached the final of the Yorkshire Cup in 1951. On their way to the final held at Fartown, they defeated Castleford, Halifax and Hunslet. Until half-time Keighley were well placed against their opponents – Wakefield Trinity. But in the second period Trinity played some fine rugby and went on to win 17–3. The Yorkshire Cup defeat seemed to have an adverse effect on Keighley who won only one of their 20 remaining games up to the end of the 1951–52 season and they finished third from the bottom of the league.

The 1952–53 season opened on 6 September. The eighth Australian touring side opened their campaign with a game at Lawkholme Lane – for the first time in front of the television cameras. Keighley were on the wrong end of a thrashing as the Aussies scored a half-century and beat the previous best score for a touring side in an opening match.

Bert Cook joined Keighley from Leeds on 21 September 1953, as player-coach. After a major financial crisis, when an entirely new board of directors took over in December 1953. On Wednesday, 9 December, following a major financial crisis, the existing members of the board resigned and were replaced by an entirely new board. Share capital was increased from £3,000 to £10,000 through the issuing of an additional 7,000 £1 shares. The traditional playing colours of blue and white were discarded in favour of the present colours of red, white and green.

In 1957 the board bought the Lawkholme Lane rugby ground, cricket ground, bowling green and cottages for £10,000. In the late 1950s, Keighley had some notable backs, in the 1957–58 season fullback Joe Phillips, and three-quarters Dave Smith, Terry Hollindrake, Derek Hallas and Roy Bleasby, between them scored no less than 89 tries.

=== 1960s–1970s ===
Rugby league as a whole went through a two-decade slump that started in the 1960s, attendances dropped and so did Keighley's performances. Keighley signed Garfield Owen as player-coach from Halifax on 12 January 1962.

=== 1980s ===
The 1980–81 season started badly but 11 wins and one draw from the last 17 games brought some respectability. Albert Fearnley resigned as coach due to poor health and was replaced by Bak Diabira. His first match was a home game against Doncaster on 15 March 1981; Keighley winning 6–5, and completed the last seven games. The team finished the season in 7th position, winning 14 and drawing one from 28 games.

Keighley continued the 1981–82 season where they had left off the previous season by winning 10 of their first 14 league games. Terrible winter weather with weeks of snow and frost hit and no matches were played between 6 December and 3 January. This break upset Keighley's form and they won only 8 out of the remaining 18 games. Keighley finished in 7th position once again.

Despite reaching the Yorkshire Cup semi–final which they lost 3–23 to Hull, the 1982–83 league campaign started badly. Keighley lost their opening three games and Bak Diabira quit as coach. Lee Greenwood, the A-team coach, took over and this immediately led to an eight-game unbeaten streak. However this could not be kept up and a spate of injuries helped to create inconsistency, especially away from home. Keighley finished the season in ninth place in the league, winning 15, drawing 5 and losing 12.

The 1983–84 season saw the worst results, since World War Two. Lee Greenwood was released after a 30–0 defeat by bottom club, Doncaster on 24 August 1983. His replacement, Geoff Peggs, was forced to rely on trialists; a total of 54 players were used including 31 debutantes during this campaign. Without this step, there would have been a danger of being unable to fulfil the fixture list. Keighley finished second from bottom of the second division with only seven wins and three draws from 34 games. The club announced massive debts and planned to sell part of the ground.

53 players were used in the 1984–85 season, which again included 31 debutantes. Despite this, Keighley's results improved and they finished 15th in the league, winning 11 games.

100 years of rugby at Lawkholme Lane was celebrated during the 1985–86 season. With mounting debts and a ground in need of investment in light of the Taylor Report. In October 1985 Keighley were served a winding-up order by Inland Revenue, which was avoided only by selling the cricket field for a reported £30,000 and the training pitch for £65,000. Keighley for the second time in three years finished the season in the second from bottom position of the second division and had taken some heavy defeats along their way. These included the worst ever defeat 2–92 away to Leigh. These poor results affected attendances and Keighley's record for the lowest gate was broken twice. First against Workington Town on 23 April when the crowd was just 386 and again on 7 May against Whitehaven when only 355 turned up to witness the 0–16 defeat. Peter Roe took over as coach mid-way through the season following the sudden death of Geoff Peggs and the results improved temporarily. Roe left the following year.

The 1987–88 season saw a recovery on the field, attributed to the signing of experienced players Trevor Skerrett, Gary Moorby and Brenden White. Attendances increased, averaging 951 in the league and a 2–16 defeat to Widnes in the second round of the Challenge Cup drew a crowd of 4,358 watched Keighley lose 2–16. Keighley finished in eighth position, winning 15 from 28 games and eventually lost to league leaders Oldham, 24–34 in the end of season play-offs.

The 1988–89 season was another year of consolidation. Keighley again completed the season in eighth position, winning 16 from 28 games. The average attendance again increased by 135 to 1,193, the best since the 1981–82 season.

For the 1989–90 season Colin Dixon moved up onto the board of directors and Les Coulter took over as head coach. The season featured a run of eleven matches with only two victories. Keighley finished the season 19th out of 21 clubs and winning only 6 games out of 28.

=== 1990–1995: Cougarmania ===
Tony Fisher replaced Les Coulter for the 1990–91 campaign which began modestly with just the one win out of eight games, a streak of 11 wins out of 14 games turned things around. Two new directors joined the board – Mick O'Neill and Mike Smith. They embarked on re-branding; the first being to rebrand the club Keighley Cougars and to rename the ground, Lawkholme Lane, as Cougar Park.

=== 1996–2000: Summer era ===
Keighley were excluded from the new Super League competition and continue to play in the Second Division, and the disappointment of being denied promotion for a second time due to marketing decisions, cost them fans and sponsors. Keighley took out an injunction to try to stop the new competition kicking off and only withdrew their legal threat with the offer of more money for lower division clubs and the prospect of promotion and relegation.

The following year, there was only one promotion place into Super League and competing against some of the larger relegated teams the Cougars could only manage a second-place finish in the league behind Salford who would also beat Keighley in the play-off final at Old Trafford. The club was taken over in a coup by Carl Metcalfe who promised to invest £3 million into the team and the ground. O'Neil, and directors Neil Spencer and Maurice Barker left to make way for the new regime. Phil Larder resigned after not being paid and was replaced by player coach Daryl Powell in April 1995.

The club offered to change their name to Pennine Cougars and ground-share with Burnley F.C. at Turf Moor in an attempt to be fast-tracked into Super League.

Metcalfe's promised millions did not materialise, and only months later, Metcalfe sold the senior squad, including Powell, to Leeds for about £10,000 and put the club into administration. He was later arrested and convicted of supplying fake illegal drugs.

Karl Harrison was appointed head coach for the 2000 Centenary season.

Assistant coach, Steve Deakin, joined Rochdale Hornets as head coach in August before rejoining Keighley as head coach in September 2000 when Harrison left to become assistant coach at Bradford Bulls.

=== 2001–2017: Lower leagues and administrations ===
After dissolving in liquidation, the club was reformed as Keighley Cougars 2001 by former directors Neil Spencer and Colin Farrer. In January 2002, Keighley appointed Gary Moorby as their coach in succession to Steve Deakin who left to join London Broncos as their assistant coach.

Keighley won promotion from National League Two in 2003 by winning the divisional final after only finishing third in the League and were promoted to National League One, having defeated Sheffield Eagles in the final. However the following season they were immediately relegated back to National League Two after a dismal season in which they only won one league game and were eliminated from the Challenge Cup by amateur side, Dudley Hill.

Peter Roe returned for his third spell in charge at Lawkholme Lane at the end of 2005, succeeding Gary Moorby. but left in 2007 after admitting he had become bored with the role and player-coach Barry Eaton took over control.

Since relegation in 2004 the club had remained in League 1 until 2009 when after beating York in the play-offs, they beat Oldham in the League 1 Grand Final on 4 October 2009, winning 28–26 to gain promotion to the Championship for 2010 in a game staged at the Halliwell Jones Stadium, Warrington.

In November 2009 a winding up petition against the owners of the club was issued by HM Revenue and Customs (HMRC) for unpaid taxes. The petition hearing was adjourned until January 2010 but in the interim Keighley Cougars (2001) Ltd went into administration on 18 December 2009 following a hearing at the High Court in Leeds. Administrators were appointed and the assets of Keighley Cougars (2001) Ltd were immediately sold to a new company Keighley Cougars (2010) Ltd. In line with RFL rules the club had a 9-point deduction applied to the following season and once again having gained promotion to the league's second tier, Keighley were immediately relegated.

Between the 2010 and 2011 season player coach Barry Eaton left to be replaced by former Super League star Jason Demetriou as player-coach. 2011 was Demetriou's first season as a coach and the Cougars, having finished second in the league, won promotion to the Championship beating Workington Town 32–12 in the play-off final.

Demetriou left at the end of the 2012 season with his side comfortably ensconced in the Championship and was succeeded by Paul March. Under March the Cougars played in the Championship until 2014 when they were relegated in controversial circumstances that led the club to consider taking legal action against the RFL. Keighley finished 10th in the league on 44 points. Batley Bulldogs finished with 42 points after being penalised three points for fielding an ineligible player in an earlier game. The deduction was appealed successfully by Batley leaving them on 45 points, one ahead of Keighley. No legal action was taken after the RFL agreed to review the disciplinary system.

The 2015 season, during which Danny Jones died whilst playing for the club, and 2016 season were played in Championship 1 with Paul March in charge. March led the club to victory in the 2016 iPro Sport Cup with a 22–18 win over York City Knights at Blackpool, however the failure to gain promotion cost March his job and he was replaced by Craig Lingard at the end of the 2016 season.

=== 2018–present: Takeovers ===
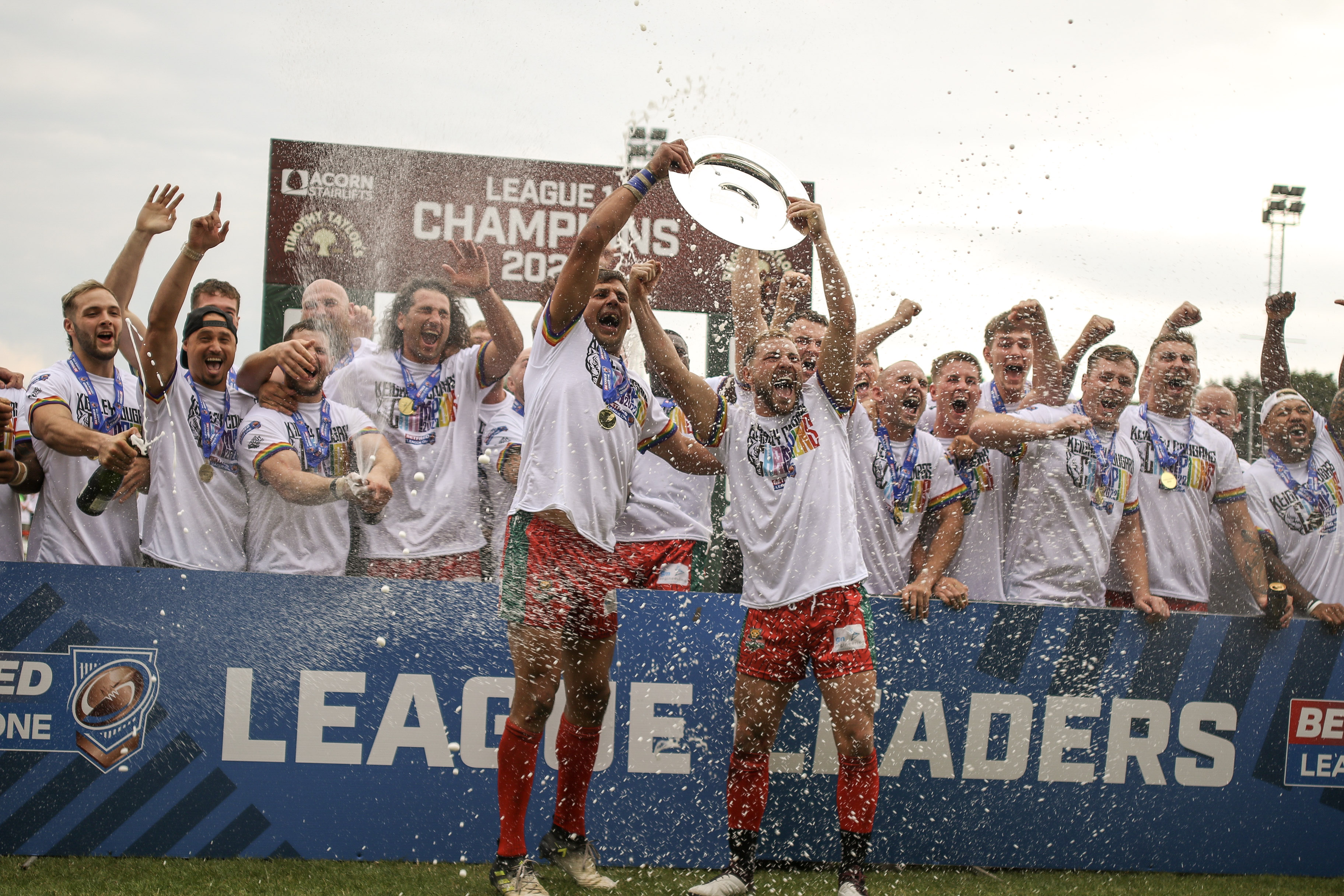
Keighley celebrating winning the 2022 RFL League 1

In July 2018 chairman Gary Fawcett stood down and the club was acquired by Austria Holdings. The next day Steve Gill, former chief executive of Castleford Tigers, was appointed as general manager of the club. In November 2018 the players were in dispute with the owners regarding unpaid wages. Austria Holdings ceded control of the club in December 2018 and Steve Gill left the club.

In January 2019 the club was purchased a consortium led by former owner Mick O'Neill. The purchase by O'Neill, Cougarmania partner Mike Smith, O'Neill's son Ryan and his husband Kaue Garcia enabled the club to be taken out of special measures and to compete in the 2019 League 1 season but with a 12-point penalty deduction.

The Cougars decided to part company with head coach Craig Lingard midway through the 2019 season, replacing Craig shortly after with Rhys Lovegrove supported by returning ex-head coach Phil Larder. Larder's return was short lived as he left the club within a few weeks of his return for 'personal reasons'.

During the season the Cougars hosted what is believed to be the first Gay Pride event in rugby league. David Connor, the RFL lead for diversity and equality, praised the club stating: "Rugby League has been breaking down social barriers for more than a hundred years and this is another important milestone. We pride ourselves on genuinely being a sport for all and Keighley are to be congratulated for actively demonstrating the inclusivity of our game".

The Cougars finished the 2019 season in 10th place with five points; despite this lowly finish the club was named RFL League 1 club of the year at the RFL annual awards ceremony in September 2019.

Club chairman, Mick O'Neill, was awarded the MBE for 'services to Rugby League Football, the community in Keighley, West Yorkshire and to Charity during the COVID-19 Pandemic' in the 2021 New Year Honours.

The 2021 season saw an improvement with the team reaching the play-offs, losing in the preliminary final to Doncaster. 2022 saw Keighley win League One going undefeated in the league season to clinch the title with two game left. In the 2023 RFL Championship season, Keighley finished in 13th position and were relegated back to League 1.

On 9 July 2024, Matt Foster was relieved of his duties as head coach and replaced by Jake Webster on an interim basis. Webster was made head coach at the end of the 2024 season but stepped down from the role on 26 February 2025. Assistant coach Jordie Hedges was appointed interim head coach. Alan Kilshaw was made head coach on a deal until the end of the 2026 season. Kilshaw left the club shortly before the start of the 2026 season to join Oldham and was replaced by Ian Hardman, formerly assistant coach at Featherstone Rovers. In the interim assistant coach Dan Burton took control.

== Rivalry ==
Keighley's main rivals are nearby Bradford Bulls. The clubs play a friendly in pre-season for the Joe Phillips Memorial Trophy, named after a former player at both clubs. During the 'Cougarmania' days, the club enjoyed a rivalry with Huddersfield which saw huge crowds including travelling support attend the games, the rivalry ended when the Giants were admitted to Super league.

== Kit sponsors and manufacturers ==
Years	Kit Manufacturer	Main Shirt Sponsor
2013	Raven Sports	A1 Stairlifts
2014	Raven Sports	GMB Union
2015	Stag	A1 Stairlifts
2016	Erra	A1 Stairlifts
2017	Kappa	A1 Stairlifts
2018	O'Neills	Shield Building and Roofing Services
2019	Raven Sports	Moochies
2020–22	Keighley Cougars	Acorn Stairlifts
2023–24	Keighley Cougars	Bedspredz Poultry
2025–	Keighley Cougars	Raiseprint

== 2027 squad ==
2027 Keighley Cougars squad
First team squad			Coaching staff
Finlay Balback – SH; Matty Beharrell (c) – SH, SO; Jayden Billy – WG; Aaron Brown – LF, SR; Brad Clavering – PR, LF; Isaac Coleman – SR; Max Fleary – SO; George Flanagan – HK; Dee Foggin-Johnston – WG	Oliver Greensmith – CE, WG, SR; Marcus Green – PR; Kye Jacobson – CE, SR; Harry Kirk – PR, SR; Waldimar Matahwa – CE, WG; Junior Nuu – CE; Dan Parker – PR, LF, SR; Lewis Pavier – CE	Brandon Pickersgill – FB, SO; Nathan Rushworth – SR, LF; Jordan Schofield – PR; Jay Scriven – LF, SR; Leo Skerrett-Evans – SR; Jack Teanby – PR; Mac Walsh – CE	Head coach: Matt Bramald; Assistant coach: Ryan Jackson; Legend: (c) Captain(s); (vc) Vice-captain(s); Updated: Source(s): https://keighleycougars.uk/team

2027 Coaching Staff
Role	Name
Head Coach	Matt Bramald
Assistant Coach	Ryan Jackson
Head of Performance	Adam Mitchell
Performance Analyst	Harry Curtis
Lead Physiotherapist	Amy Southam

== 2027 transfers ==
=== Gains ===
Player	From	Contract	Date
Marcus Green	Sheffield Eagles	1 year	7 October 2026
Oliver Greensmith	Batley Bulldogs	1 year	8 October 2026
Jayden Billy	Sheffield Eagles	1 year	9 October 2026
Isaac Coleman	Rochdale Hornets	1 year	10 October 2026
Finlay Balback	Bradford Bulls	1 year	12 October 2026
Jay Scriven	Rochdale Hornets	1 year	20 October 2026
Lewis Pavier	Castleford Tigers	1 year	21 October 2026
Max Fleary	Newsome Panthers	1 year	21 October 2026
Kye Jacobson	unattached	1 year	26 October 2026
Harry Kirk	unattached	1 year	13 November 2026

=== Losses ===
Player	Club	Date
Dylan Proud	Rochdale Hornets	17 September 2026
Oli Whitford	Rochdale Hornets	13 October 2026
Lachi Lanskey	Rochdale Hornets	28 October 2026
Oli Burton	Goole Vikings	8 October 2026
Alfie Dean	Goole Vikings	11 October 2026
Lucas Green	Oldham	9 October 2026
Connor Sayner	Oldham	19 October 2026
Leo Aliyu	Batley Bulldogs	13 October 2026
Brad Holroyd	Swinton Lions	27 October 2026
Max Clarke	Cessnock Goannas	27 October 2026

== Players ==
=== Players earning international caps while at Keighley ===
A number of players have been capped for their countries while playing for Keighley.

- C. Burton (England)
- Jason Critchley (Wales)
- Colin Evans (Wales)
- Norman Foster (England)
- Stuart Gallacher (Wales)
- Terry Hollindrake (Great Britain)
- Brian Jefferson (England)
- Danny Jones (Wales)
- W. Jones (Wales)
- Harold "Hal" Jones (Wales) (Note: also won representative caps for Great Britain but never played a test match)
- Jason Lee (Wales)
- Neil Lowe (Scotland)
- Harry Myers (England) (Note: appeared for England at rugby union before Keighley joined the Northern Union)
- L. Orchard (Wales)
- Nick Pinkney (England) (Note: also won representative caps for Great Britain but never played a test match)
- Daryl Powell (Great Britain)
- William "Billy" Watson (Wales)
- Oliver Wilkes (Scotland)
- Billy Walkley (Wales)
- Oliver Whitford (Ireland)
- Lachlan Lanskey (Ireland)
- Leo Aliyu (Nigeria)

=== Other notable players ===
These players have either; received a testimonial match, or were international representatives before, or after, their time at Keighley.

- Bill Aspinall (Testimonial match 1972)
- Llew Bevan (circa-1940s/50s
- Charlie Birdsall circa-1974
- Neville Black circa-1953 stand-off (ex-Wigan)
- Gordon Brown
- John Burke prop circa-1974
- Geoff Butterfield (Testimonial match 1995)
- Phil Cantillon
- Des Clarkson c. 1955
- Thomas Cockcroft scrum-half 1938 & 1944
- William Cockcroft wing 1967 & 1974
- Isaac Cole
- Bert Cook
- David Creasser
- Geoff Crewdson (Testimonial match 1966)
- Sam Crowther 2009–10
- Dai Davies scrum-half
- Kenneth Davies scrum-half (Testimonial match 1950)
- Mel De Lloyd
- Alan Dickinson c. 1968
- Keith Dixon (Testimonial match 1995)
- Grant Doorey
- Jason Donnelly
- Geoff Dudley circa-1962
- Barry Eaton
- Kevin Ellis
- St. John Ellis
- Joe Flanagan circa-1962
- Darren Fleary
- Brian Gaines circa-1965
- Dave Garbett circa-1974
- Tony Garforth prop circa-1976
- Ian Gately prop circa-1995
- Joey Grima
- Frank Haigh circa-1962
- Derek Hallas 12/1953...01/1959, and 10/1962...04/1963 Great Britain, Yorkshire (RU)/(RL), Roundhay (RU), Leeds, and Parramatta player
- Sid Hebden circa-1962
- Iorwerth Herbert circa-1940s/1950s
- Fred Higginbotham (centre from Warrington) circa-1940s/1950s
- Brendan Hill prop circa-1990s
- Ian Hughes
- Dave Jickells, c. 1974
- Eric Johnson circa-1953 fullback (ex-Wigan)
- Alan Kellett stand-off, centre player-coach from February 1968, Captain
- Dick Kendall 1921/22-1932/33
- Bob Kelly
- Brian Larkin c. 1968
- Reg Lloyd (Resolven) circa-1940s/1950s
- John Mantle
- John A Martin
- Frank Mortimer
- Dick Moulding c. 1968
- Paul Moses (Testimonial match 1995)
- Harry Murphy, for England while at Wakefield Trinity 1946 France, Wales, for Great Britain while at Wakefield Trinity 1950 Australia (Later joined Keighley)
- Kevan Narey 1950s/60s
- Terry O'Brien c. 1968 (Testimonial match 1973)
- Garfield Owen
- Harold Palin
- Eric Palmer c. 1968
- Lee Paterson
- Tony Pell c. 1968
- Edward Perkins 1921/22-1932/33
- Syd Phillips circa-1962
- Harry Plunkett
- Keith Pollard hooker circa-1967
- Barry Potter c. 1968
- Rod Raines circa-1953 second-row (ex-Wigan)
- Dean Raistrick prop circa-1974
- Jason Ramshaw (Testimonial match 2002)
- Eric Redman circa-1962
- Kenny Roberts c. 1968
- Peter Roe
- Jack Rogers c. 1968
- Jordan Ross
- Albert Rowlands circa-1953 scrum-half (ex-Wigan)
- Roy Sabine
- Bill Sharpe circa-1962
- Joseph Sherburn circa-1922
- Trevor Skerrett
- M. Slater circa-1922
- Mel Smith circa-1962
- Richard Smith
- Phil Stephenson (Testimonial match 2005)
- Andre Stoop
- Jim Sullivan
- Latham Tawhai
- Lewis Taylor
- Bryan Todd
- Jim Traill
- Rob Valentine
- J. Waite circa-1922
- Len Ward circa-1962
- Sonny Whakarau
- Philip Whiteside
- Gary Widdop
- Calvin Wilkes
- Daley Williams
- Ricky Winterbottom (Testimonial match 1995)
- Martin Wood
- George Woosey circa-1953 prop
- Dave Worthy
- Jamaine Wray
- Brian Wright circa-1962
- William Yiend

== Past coaches ==
Also see Category:Keighley Cougars coaches

- Jim Davies 1920
- Bert Cook 1953-195?
- Fred Barrett 195?–195?
- Russell Pepperell 196?–1964
- Gordon Brown 196?–196?
- Harry Street 1965–1967
- Donald Metcalfe 1967
- Alan Kellett 1968
- Mick Clark 1969–1969
- Roy Sabine 1976
- Bakary Diabira 1981–1982
- Lee Greenwood 1982–1983
- Geoff Peggs 1983–1985
- Peter Roe 1985–1986
- Colin Dixon 1986–89
- Les Coulter 1989–1990
- Tony Fisher 1990–1991
- Peter Roe 1991–1994
- Phil Larder 1994–1996
- Daryl Powell 1996–1997
- John Kain 1997–1998
- Lee Crooks 1998–1999
- Frank Punchard 1999
- Karl Harrison 2000
- Steve Deakin 2000–2001
- Gary Moorby 2002–2005
- Peter Roe 2006
- Barry Eaton 2007–2010
- Jason Demetriou 2011–2012
- Paul March 2013–2016
- Craig Lingard 2017–2019
- Rhys Lovegrove 2019–2023
- Matt Foster 2023–2024
- Jake Webster 2024–2025
- Jordie Hedges (interim) 2025
- Alan Kilshaw 2025
- Danny Burton (interim) 2026

== Seasons ==
=== Summer era ===
Season summary since the introduction of summer rugby in the UK
Season	League									Play-offs	Challenge Cup	Other competitions		Name	Tries	Name	Points
Season	Division	P	W	D	L	F	A	Pts	Pos	Play-offs	Challenge Cup	Other competitions		Top try scorer		Top point scorer	
1996	Division One	20	14	2	4	558	333	30	2nd		R5						
1997	Division One	20	11	1	8	428	332	23	3rd		QF						
1998	Division One	30	14	1	15	587	675	29	7th		R4						
1999	Northern Ford Premiership	28	14	1	13	584	612	29	9th		R4						
2000	Northern Ford Premiership	28	22	0	6	1002	401	44	2nd		R4						
2001	Northern Ford Premiership	28	16	1	11	810	498	33	8th		R4	Trans-Pennine Cup	RU				
2002	Northern Ford Premiership	27	7	0	20	488	906	14	14th		R3						
2003	National League Two	18	13	0	5	488	340	26	3rd	Won in Play-off Final	R4						
2004	National League One	18	1	0	17	366	708	2	10th		R3						
2005	National League Two	18	4	1	13	359	471	9	8th		R4						
2006	National League Two	22	4	1	17	419	736	9	11th		R4						
2007	National League Two	22	6	1	15	407	692	24	10th		R4						
2008	National League Two	22	15	0	7	611	519	48	5th		R3						
2009	Championship 1	18	13	0	5	539	415	42	2nd	Won in Play-off Final	R4						
2010	Championship	20	4	1	15	362	703	10	11th		R3						
2011	Championship 1	20	13	0	7	663	412	43	2nd	Won in Play-off Final	R4						
2012	Championship	18	8	1	9	395	368	31	6th	Lost in Elimination Playoffs	R4						
2013	Championship	26	8	0	18	492	719	33	11th		R4						
2014	Championship	26	12	0	14	587	601	44	10th		QF						
2015	Championship 1	22	18	4	0	759	400	36	2nd	Lost in Play-off Final	R3	League 1 Cup	R2				
2016	League 1	21	11	0	10	658	514	22	7th		R4	League 1 Cup	W				
2017	League 1	22	10	2	10	728	565	22	7th		R4	League 1 Cup	QF				
2018	League 1	26	13	0	13	839	657	26	9th		R3						
2019	League 1	20	8	1	11	447	576	5	10th		R4	1895 Cup	R1	Jack Miller	15	Benn Hardcastle	135
2020	League 1	League abandoned due to the COVID-19 pandemic									R3						
2021	League 1	18	11	1	6	612	385	23	4th	Lost in Preliminary Final	R3 (Note: Officially round 1 due to the competitions temporary restructure in 2021.)	1895 Cup	R1	Jack Miller	14	Jack Miller	262
2022	League 1	20	20	0	0	989	194	40	1st	N/A (Note: League leaders do not compete in playoffs)	R2	1895 Cup	R1	Mo Agoro	28	Jack Miller	340
2023	Championship	27	8	0	19	506	837	16	13th	R5				Charlie Graham	10	Dane Chisholm	80
2024	League One	20	15	1	4	694	352	31	2nd	Lost in Play-off Final	R4	1895 Cup	GS	Billy Walkley	20	Jack Miller	190
2025	League One	18	6	0	12	362	422	12	9th (Note: Promotion due to the merging League One and the Championship)	Play-offs cancelled	R2	1895 Cup	R1	Brad England	11	Matty Beharrell	64
2026	Championship	24	6	2	16	594	678	14	16th		R4	1895 Cup	R1				

== Honours ==
Leagues

- Second Division / Championship

Winners (2): 1902–03, 1994–95
Runners up (1): 1962–63

- Third Division / League 1:

Winners (3): 1992–93, 2003, 2022
Runners up (2): 2009, 2011, 2015, 2024

Cups

- Challenge Cup:

Runners up (1): 1937

- League 1 Cup:

Winners (1): 2016

== Records ==
- Biggest home victory (also biggest home winning margin): 96–0 vs London Skolars 1 May 2022
- Biggest away victory: 112–6 vs West Wales Raiders 15 September 2018
- Biggest home defeat: 0–76 vs Wigan 15 February 1998
- Biggest away defeat: 2–92 vs Leigh, 30 April 1996
- Highest home attendance: 14,500 vs Halifax, 3 March 1953
- Lowest home attendance: 216 vs Fulham, 4 April 1987
