= Syd Phillips =

Australian rules footballer

Personal information
- Full name: Sydney Wilfred Hastings Phillips
- Born: 27 May 1874; Fitzroy, Victoria
- Died: 25 August 1960 (aged 86); Perth, Western Australia

Playing career^{1}
Years	Club	Games (Goals)
1893–96	St Kilda (VFA)	74 (1)
1897–98	St Kilda	25 (0)
1899–1904 (?)	Perth	? (?)
- ^{1} Playing statistics correct to the end of 1898.

Sydney Wilfred Hastings Phillips (27 May 1874 – 25 August 1960) was an Australian rules footballer who played with St Kilda in the Victorian Football League (VFL).

After six years with St Kilda (spanning the time when they entered the VFL), Phillips took a role with the Perth Mint in late 1898 and moved to Western Australia where he was captain of the Perth Football Club for a few years. He later took up lawn bowls and became a state champion of both Victoria and Western Australia.
