= Matty Beharrell =

English rugby league footballer

Personal information
- Full name: Matthew Beharrell
- Born: 29 March 1994 (age 32) Kingston upon Hull, Humberside, England
- Height: 1.63 m (5 ft 4 in)
- Weight: 13 st 5 lb (85 kg)

Playing information
- Position: Scrum-half
Club
| Years | Team | Pld | T | G | FG | P |
|---|---|---|---|---|---|---|
| 2012–2014 | Hull Kingston Rovers | 1 | 0 | 0 | 0 | 0 |
| 2014(loan) | → Gateshead Thunder | 20 | 10 | 25 | 1 | 91 |
| 2015 | Newcastle Thunder | 22 | 7 | 46 | 1 | 121 |
| 2016 | Swinton Lions | 26 | 2 | 1 | 1 | 11 |
| 2017–2018 | Keighley Cougars | 38 | 9 | 111 | 2 | 260 |
| 2018–2021 | Doncaster | 15 | 5 | 56 | 02 | 132 |
| 2022 | Dewsbury Rams | 13 | 1 | 21 | 0 | 46 |
| 2022(loan) | → Hunslet RLFC | 8 | 2 | 17 | 1 | 43 |
| 2023–25 | Hunslet RLFC | 66 | 6 | 166 | 3 | 365 |
| 2025– | Keighley Cougars | 9 | 0 | 28 | 0 | 56 |
| | Total | 218 | 42 | 471 | 11 | 1125 |
- Source: As of 25 September 2025

Matty Beharrell (born 29 March 1994) is a professional rugby league footballer who plays for Keighley Cougars in the RFL Championship. He plays as a scrum-half.

== Playing career ==
=== Hull KR ===
Beharrell started his career at Hull Kingston Rovers' first team where he was the under-18 winner of the 2012 Man of Steel Awards winner in 2012. He came through Hull KR's academy, and was signed onto a professional contract in 2012. His only Super League appearance to date, has come in Hull KR's record 84–6 loss to Wigan. He is just 5 feet 4 inches (1.63 m), which makes him the smallest player to have played in Super League, one inch smaller than Warrick Davis.

While at Hull KR, Beharrell spent two seasons at Newcastle Thunder on dual registration terms before joining Newcastle on a one-year contract.

=== Swinton Lions ===
In 2015 Beharrell joined Swinton Lions where he spent one season before moving to Keighley Cougars for the start of the 2017 season.

=== Doncaster RLFC ===
Beharell left Keighley in the middle of the 2018 season to join Doncaster for the rest of the 2018 season and 2019.

=== Hunslet RLFC ===
On 16 April 2023, it was reported that Beharrell had re-joined Hunslet RLFC, from local amateur side Hull Dockers, for the remainder of the 2023 season

=== Keighley Cougars (re-join) ===
On 4 June 2025 it was reported that he had re-joined Keighley Cougars in the RFL League 1 on a 2½-year deal. His first game back was against Rochdale Hornets in Round 12 of the 2025 RFL League One, where in which he scored the final points of the match securing the win with a high pressure penalty kick, to bring the final score to 26–25.
