= Jack Miller (rugby league, born 1994) =

English rugby league footballer

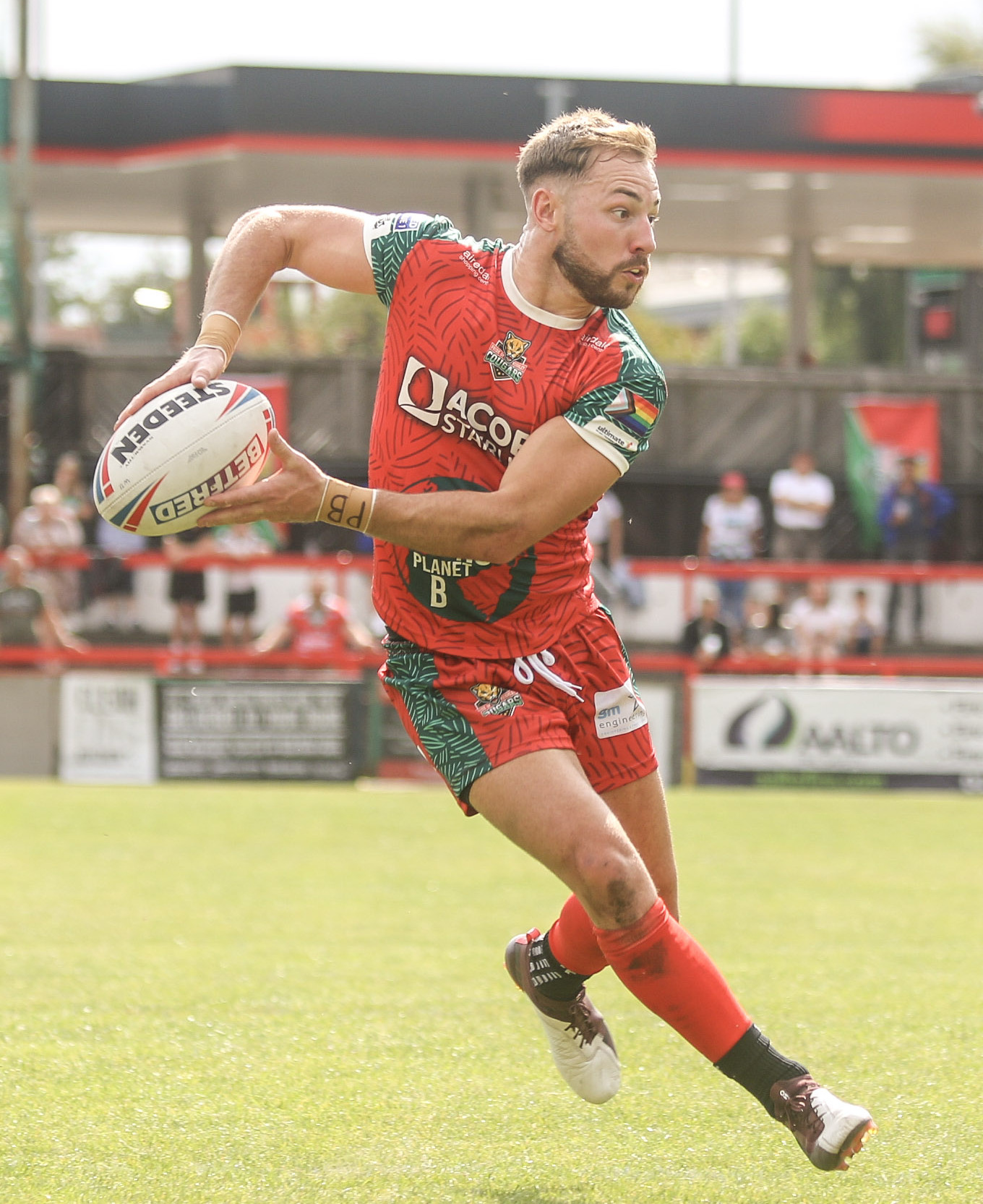

Personal information
- Born: 28 November 1994 (age 31) Yorkshire, England
- Height: 5 ft 9 in (1.75 m)
- Weight: 12 st 11 lb (81 kg)

Playing information
- Position: Scrum-half, Stand-off
Club
Years	Team	Pld	T	G	FG	P
2013–14	Huddersfield Giants	1	0	1	0	2
2017–18	Doncaster	28	8	93	2	220
2019–23	Keighley Cougars	68	47	256	0	700
2023	Newcastle Thunder	21	3	20	0	52
2024–25	Keighley Cougars	34	5	127	3	227
2025	Rochdale Hornets	2	0	6	1	13
2026–	Goole Vikings	14	2	41	0	90
	Total	168	65	544	6	1304
- Source: As of 22 September 2026

Jack Miller (born 28 November 1994) is a rugby league footballer who plays as a scrum-half or stand-off for Goole Vikings in the Betfred Championship.

== Career ==
Miller played for amateur team, Smallthorne Panthers, before signing an academy contract with the Huddersfield Giants in 2011. In May 2013 he played for the England Academy side in a 52–18 win against the French under-18 team in Bordeaux.

=== Huddersfield Giants ===
Two months previously, Miller signed a two-year contract with Huddersfield and was promoted to the first team. His first team debut was on 7 September 2013 when he started as scrum-half in the final round of Super League XVIII against the Bradford Bulls. Miller and fellow debutant, Jake Connor scored Huddersfield's only points in a 58–6 defeat, Miller converting Connor's try.

Although Miller was named in Huddersfield's first team squad for 2014, he did not play any first team games during the season and was released by Huddersfield at the end of the season.

=== Queanbeyan Kangaroos ===
Miller travelled to Australia to join the Queanbeyan Kangaroos in the Canberra Raiders Cup. In his first season in Australia he was the winner of the McIntyre Medal as the league's first-grade player of the year. In his second season the Queanbeyan Kangaroos won the minor premiership in the Canberra Raiders Cup.

=== Doncaster ===
After two seasons in Australia, Miller returned to England and signed for League One side Doncaster in October 2016. During the 2017 and 2018 seasons Miller made 28 appearances for Doncaster scoring eight tries and kicking 95 goals.

=== Keighley Cougars ===
In October 2018 Miller made the move from South Yorkshire to West Yorkshire to join fellow League One side, Keighley Cougars. The Cougars top-try scorer in his first season, Miller has been ever present since 2021 scoring in every game in 2021 and 2022. Appointed captain at Keighley for 2022, Miller led the Cougars through a unbeaten league campaign as the team became 2022 League One Champions. In both the 2021 and 2022 seasons, Miller has been the League One top-goal scorer and top-points scorer.

=== Newcastle Thunder ===
Miller left Keighley to join Newcastle Thunder three weeks into the 2023 season.

=== Keighley Cougars (re-join) ===
On 29 September 2023, Miller rejoined Keighley in League One on a two-year deal. Miller's departure from Keighley was announced on 4 June 2025.

=== Rochdale Hornets ===
Miller joined Rochdale for the remainder of the 2025 season on 5 June 2025. Miller's debut for Rochdale was made against Keighley on 15 June.

=== Goole Vikings ===
On 23 September 2025 Miller signed for Goole Vikings on a 2-year deal.
