= 2015 League 1 Cup =

2015 iPro Sport Cup
- Official logo of the iPro sports cup
- Duration: 4 Rounds
- Number of teams: 16
- Highest attendance: 1,200
- Lowest attendance: 150
- Broadcast partners: Sky Sports (Cup Final Only)
- Winners: North Wales Crusaders
- Runners-up: Swinton Lions
- Biggest home win: Keighley Cougars 64 - 0 East Leeds
- Biggest away win: London Skolars10 – 78 York City Knights
- Top point-scorer(s): Matty Beharrell 20pts

The 2015 League 1 Cup or 2015 iPro Cup for sponsorship reasons is the first year in the tournament's existence. 16 teams are playing in this years tournament, no team in a division higher than the Championship One. The tournament is seen as a replacement for the recently ceased Northern Rail Cup however teams from the Championship are not eligible to compete.

The final of the competition was played as the opening match of the 2015 Summer Bash at Bloomfield Road, Blackpool. It was won by North Wales Crusaders who defeated Swinton Lions.

== Teams competing ==
- Barrow Raiders
- Coventry Bears
- East Leeds
- Hemel Stags
- Keighley Cougars
- London Skolars
- Newcastle Thunder
- North Wales Crusaders
- Oldham R.L.F.C.
- Oxford Rugby League
- Rochdale Hornets
- South Wales Scorpions
- Swinton Lions
- University of Gloucestershire All Golds
- West Hull
- York City Knights

== First round ==
Home	Score	Away	Match information
Home	Score	Away	Date and time	Venue	Referee	Attendance
West Hull	10 – 36	North Wales Crusaders	Saturday 28 February 2015, 15:00	YPI Hull	C Campbell	150
Oxford Rugby League	20 – 56	Newcastle Thunder	Saturday 28 February 2015, 15:00	Iffley Road	J Roberts	220
Barrow Raiders	16 – 14	Gloucestershire All Golds	Sunday 1 March 2015, 14:00	Craven Park	J Bloem	836
Keighley Cougars	64 – 0	East Leeds	Sunday 1 March 2015, 15:00	Cougar Park	T Grant	423
Swinton Lions	34 – 0	Hemel Stags	Sunday 1 March 2015, 15:00	Park Lane, Sedgley Park	M Woodhead	349
Oldham R.L.F.C.	42 – 6	Coventry Bears	Sunday 1 March 2015, 15:00	Whitebank Stadium	D Merrick	425
Rochdale Hornets	40 – 0	South Wales Scorpions	Sunday 1 March 2015, 15:00	Spotland	C Kendall	260
London Skolars	10 – 78	York City Knights	Sunday 1 March 2015, 15:00	New River Stadium	W Turley	156

== Second round ==
Home	Score	Away	Match information
Home	Score	Away	Date and time	Venue	Referee	Attendance
Barrow Raiders	10 – 32	Oldham R.L.F.C.	15 March 2015, 14:00	Craven Park	M Woodhead	844
North Wales Crusaders	28 – 4	Rochdale Hornets	15 March 2015, 14:30	Racecourse Stadium, Wrexham	G Hewer	465
York City Knights	24 – 38	Newcastle Thunder	15 March 2015, 15:00	Huntington Stadium	T Crashley	358
Keighley Cougars	22 – 24	Swinton Lions	15 March 2015, 15:00	Cougar Park	D Merrick	472

== Semi finals ==
Home	Score	Away	Match information
Home	Score	Away	Date and time	Venue	Referee	Attendance
Swinton Lions	36 – 28	Newcastle Thunder	7 April 2015, 20:00 BST	Park Lane, Sedgley Park	M Woodhead	351
Oldham R.L.F.C.	16 – 18	North Wales Crusaders	8 April 2015, 19:30 BST	Whitebank Stadium	D Merrick	444

== Final ==
Home	Score	Away	Match information
Home	Score	Away	Date and time	Venue	Referee	Attendance
Swinton Lions	8 – 14	North Wales Crusaders	23 May 2015	Bloomfield Road, Blackpool	M Woodhead	1,200 (Note: The figure for the first day of Summer Bash was 8360, but the RFL report estimated only 1,200 for this match)
