= Tony Benson (rugby league) =

New Zealand rugby league coach

Personal information
- Full name: Tony Edwin Benson
- Born: 22 December 1965 (age 59); Auckland, New Zealand

Coaching information
Club
Years	Team	Gms	W	D	L	W%
2001–05	Hibiscus Coast Raiders
2005–06	Leigh Centurions
2007	London Skolars
2009–12	Oldham R.L.F.C.
2013–14	Oxford Rugby League
2015–16	MMU RL
2015–16	Crosfields RL
2021–	Glenora Bears
	Total	0	0	0	0
Representative
Years	Team	Gms	W	D	L	W%
2002–05	Junior Kiwis
2007	Ireland A
2015–17	Belgium	0	0	0	0
2017–18	Kiwi Ferns
- As of 15 March 2021

Tony Benson (born 22 December 1965) is a rugby league coach from New Zealand.

== Coaching career ==
=== New Zealand ===
Benson coached Bartercard Cup team Hibiscus Coast Raiders from 2001 to 2005, as well as the Junior Kiwis team from 2003 to 2005.

=== Great Britain ===
Moving to Britain in September 2005, Benson took charge of Leigh Centurions. Leigh's relegation from Super League had been all but confirmed at the time of his appointment and he knew his task would be to lead the club back to the top. He replaced Darren Abram, who left the club in September 2005. In his only season in charge, Benson led the Centurions to cup glory, in the victory over Hull Kingston Rovers in the Northern Rail Cup final.

Benson parted company with Leigh after the club's defeat by Batley Bulldogs in the 2006 National League One playoffs. Following the announcement, a number of Leigh's coaching staff and management left the club, resigning to show solidarity with Benson.

In 2007, Benson coached the Ireland A squad in the four nations championship. He also led the Irish Wolfhounds on a tour of New Zealand.

He was appointed head coach of the London Skolars in December 2007 to replace Latham Tawhai, who left to become the understudy coach at neighbours Harlequins RL. Benson left his job at London Skolars at the end of the season due to the inconvenience of travelling from his home in Leigh, Greater Manchester.

In 2009 he was appointed head coach of Oldham R.L.F.C. in the British Rugby League National Championship 1.

When he left Oldham, Benson became the first coach of new side Oxford Rugby League. He left the club after two seasons. Benson subsequently took up a post with Belgium Rugby League as Sport Director. Benson then decided to give up the professional side of the game to set up a coaching business coaching the amateur side of the game. He took on the Crosfields first team job, Manchester Met University RL and Leigh Miners U13s, while still coaching Belgium. He coached each team for 2 years and in his second season he won every title available losing only 3 games in a season across all 4 teams.

=== Kiwi Ferns ===
He was appointed as the coach of the Kiwi Ferns in March 2017 where they competed at the 2017 Rugby League World Cup and lost narrowly in the Grand Final after completing the pool games undefeated.

Sporting positions
Preceded by Tommy Martyn; 2005	Coach Leigh Centurions; 2005–2006	Succeeded by Darren Shaw; 2006–2008
Preceded by Latham Tawhai; 2005-2007	Coach London Skolars; 2007-2008	Succeeded by Jermaine Coleman; 2009
Preceded by Steve Deakin; 2007–2008	Coach Oldham RLFC; 2008–2012	Succeeded by Scott Naylor; 2013–2019
Preceded by Eric Delreux; 2009–2015	Coach Belgium; 2015–present	Succeeded by Incumbent
Preceded by Michael Rawiri	Coach (New Zealand); Kiwi Ferns; 2017–2018	Succeeded by Justin Morgan; 2018–2020
