= 2012 Championship 1 season results =

Rugby league competition results

This is a list of the 2012 Championship 1 season results. Championship 1 is the third-tier rugby league competition in the United Kingdom. The 2012 season started on 11 March and ends on 30 September with the grand final at the Halliwell Jones Stadium in Warrington.

The 2012 season consists of two stages. The regular season was played over 18 round-robin fixtures, in which each of the fourteen teams involved in the competition played each other once at home and once away. In the Championship, a win was worth three points in the table, a draw worth two points apiece, and a loss by less than 12 points during the game earned one bonus point. Defeats by more than 12 points yielded no points.

For one year only, the top four teams at the end of the regular season, Barrow Raiders, Doncaster, Whitehaven and Workington Town, are promoted to the 2013 RFL Championship, as part of an expanded 14-team division. However, the champions of the division will be decided through the second stage of the season, the play-offs. The top six teams in the table contest to play in the grand final, the winners of which will be crowned champions.

== Regular season ==
=== Round 1 ===
Home	Score	Away	Match information
Home	Score	Away	Date and time	Venue	Referee	Attendance
North Wales Crusaders	24–26	Barrow Raiders	11 March, 14:30 GMT	Racecourse Ground	Matthew Kidd	1,513
Doncaster	48–16	Whitehaven	11 March, 15:00 GMT	Keepmoat Stadium	Chris Leatherbarrow	761
Gateshead Thunder	30–32	South Wales Scorpions	11 March, 15:00 GMT	Thunderdome	Dave Merrick	233
Rochdale Hornets	36–4	London Skolars	11 March, 15:00 GMT	Spotland Stadium	Clint Sharrad	359
Workington Town	14–24	Oldham R.L.F.C.	11 March, 15:00 GMT	Derwent Park	Warren Turley	760

=== Round 2 ===
Home	Score	Away	Match information
Home	Score	Away	Date and time	Venue	Referee	Attendance
South Wales Scorpions	10–40	Workington Town	18 March, 13:00 GMT	The Gnoll	Warren Turley	374
Barrow Raiders	25–8	Doncaster	18 March, 15:00 GMT	Craven Park	Jamie Leahy	1,325
London Skolars	66–16	North Wales Crusaders	18 March, 15:00 GMT	New River Stadium	Tom Crashley	535
Oldham R.L.F.C.	40–14	Gateshead Thunder	18 March, 15:00 GMT	Whitebank Stadium	George Stokes	539
Whitehaven	30–10	Rochdale Hornets	18 March, 15:00 GMT	Recreation Ground	Dave Merrick	714

=== Round 3 ===
Home	Score	Away	Match information
Home	Score	Away	Date and time	Venue	Referee	Attendance
Workington Town	27–20	London Skolars	1 April, 14:00 BST	Derwent Park	Chris Leatherbarrow	430
North Wales Crusaders	18–54	Rochdale Hornets	1 April, 14:30 BST	Racecourse Ground	Warren Turley	1,047
Doncaster	46–12	South Wales Scorpions	1 April, 15:00 BST	Keepmoat Stadium	Dave Merricks	606
Gateshead Thunder	18–30	Whitehaven	1 April, 15:00 BST	Thunderdome	Joe Cobb	347
Oldham R.L.F.C.	32–26	Barrow Raiders	1 April, 15:00 BST	Whitebank Stadium	Clint Sharrad	1,114

=== Round 4 ===
Home	Score	Away	Match information
Home	Score	Away	Date and time	Venue	Referee	Attendance
Rochdale Hornets	18–10	Oldham R.L.F.C.	6 April, 13:00 BST	Spotland Stadium	Gareth Hewer	1,020
Barrow Raiders	40–12	Gateshead Thunder	6 April, 15:00 BST	Craven Park	Peter Brooke	1,371
Doncaster	58–16	London Skolars	6 April, 15:00 BST	Keepmoat Stadium	George Stokes	541
Whitehaven	12–30	Workington Town	6 April, 15:00 BST	Recreation Ground	Matt Thomason	1,529
North Wales Crusaders	34–22	South Wales Scorpions	9 April, 17:00 BST	Racecourse Ground	Chris Leatherbarrow	1,204

=== Round 5 ===
Home	Score	Away	Match information
Home	Score	Away	Date and time	Venue	Referee	Attendance
Barrow Raiders	44–18	Rochdale Hornets	22 April, 15:00 BST	Craven Park	Dave Merrick	1,332
Gateshead Thunder	22–40	Doncaster	22 April, 15:00 BST	Thunderdome	Ronnie Laughton	316
London Skolars	20–20	Oldham R.L.F.C.	22 April, 15:00 BST	New River Stadium	Joe Cobb	492
South Wales Scorpions	0–34	Whitehaven	22 April, 15:00 BST	The Gnoll	Chris Leatherbarrow	231
Workington Town	58–0	North Wales Crusaders	22 April, 15:00 BST	Derwent Park		776

=== Round 6 ===
Home	Score	Away	Match information
Home	Score	Away	Date and time	Venue	Referee	Attendance
Whitehaven	36–28	London Skolars	6 May, 14:00 BST	Recreation Ground	Matt Thomason	628
Doncaster	48–26	Rochdale Hornets	6 May, 15:00 BST	Keepmoat Stadium	Peter Brooke	720
Oldham R.L.F.C.	32–36	North Wales Crusaders	6 May, 15:00 BST	Whitebank Stadium	Chris Leatherbarrow	580
South Wales Scorpions	24–42	Barrow Raiders	6 May, 15:00 BST	The Gnoll	Matthew Kidd	337
Workington Town	58–6	Gateshead Thunder	6 May, 15:00 BST	Derwent Park	James Bloom	467

=== Round 7 ===
Home	Score	Away	Match information
Home	Score	Away	Date and time	Venue	Referee	Attendance
North Wales Crusaders	10–17	Whitehaven	13 May, 14:30 BST	Racecourse Ground	Matthew Kidd	804
Barrow Raiders	20–12	Workington Town	13 May, 15:00 BST	Craven Park	Chris Leatherbarrow	1,808
Doncaster	40–18	Oldham R.L.F.C.	13 May, 15:00 BST	Keepmoat Stadium	Dave Merrick	653
Rochdale Hornets	46–26	Gateshead Thunder	13 May, 15:00 BST	Spotland Stadium	Greg Dolan	350
London Skolars	64–6	South Wales Scorpions	29 July, 14:00 BST ^{A}	New River Stadium	Greg Dolan	290

=== Round 8 ===
Home	Score	Away	Match information
Home	Score	Away	Date and time	Venue	Referee	Attendance
Barrow Raiders	42–12	London Skolars	20 May, 15:00 BST	Craven Park	Joe Cobb	1,159
Oldham R.L.F.C.	16–26	Whitehaven	20 May, 15:00 BST	Whitebank Stadium	Chris Leatherbarrow	624
South Wales Scorpions	32–30	Rochdale Hornets	20 May, 15:00 BST	The Gnoll	Warren Turley	557
Workington Town	45–18	Doncaster	20 May, 15:00 BST	Derwent Park	Gareth Hewer	804
Gateshead Thunder	10–60	North Wales Crusaders	15 July, 15:00 BST^{B}	Filtrona Park	Matthew Kidd	336

=== Round 9 ===
Home	Score	Away	Match information
Home	Score	Away	Date and time	Venue	Referee	Attendance
Oldham R.L.F.C.	30–35	South Wales Scorpions	26 May, 13:00 BST	Whitebank Stadium	Greg Dolan	471
London Skolars	48–22	Gateshead Thunder	27 May, 14:00 BST	New River Stadium	Dave Sharpe	353
North Wales Crusaders	28–41	Doncaster	27 May, 14:30 BST	Racecourse Ground	James Bloom	705
Whitehaven	28–42	Barrow Raiders	27 May, 15:00 BST	Recreation Ground	Tom Crashley	1,124
Rochdale Hornets	24–37	Workington Town	3 June, 15:00 BST	Spotland Stadium	Ronnie Laughton	512

=== Round 10 ===
Home	Score	Away	Match information
Home	Score	Away	Date and time	Venue	Referee	Attendance
Rochdale Hornets	6–38	Doncaster	29 April, 15:00 BST	Spotland Stadium	Gareth Hewer	301
London Skolars	12–44	Workington Town	10 June, 14:00 BST	New River Stadium	Greg Dolan	623
North Wales Crusaders	30–28	Oldham R.L.F.C.	10 June, 14:30 BST	Racecourse Ground	Matt Thomason	822
Gateshead Thunder	18–40	Barrow Raiders	10 June, 15:00 BST	Filtrona Park	Dave Sharpe	398
Whitehaven	34–18	South Wales Scorpions	10 June, 15:00 BST	Recreation Ground	Dave Merrick	648

=== Round 11 ===
Home	Score	Away	Match information
Home	Score	Away	Date and time	Venue	Referee	Attendance
Barrow Raiders	40–24	North Wales Crusaders	24 June, 15:00 BST	Craven Park	Peter Brooke	1,238
Doncaster	78–6	Gateshead Thunder	24 June, 15:00 BST	Keepmoat Stadium	Matthew Kidd	656
Oldham R.L.F.C.	4–30	Rochdale Hornets	24 June, 15:00 BST	Whitebank Stadium	Joe Cobb	599
South Wales Scorpions	32–36	London Skolars	24 June, 15:00 BST	The Gnoll	Warren Turley	907
Workington Town	30–28	Whitehaven	24 June, 15:00 BST	Derwent Park	Matthew Thomasson	721

=== Round 12 ===
Home	Score	Away	Match information
Home	Score	Away	Date and time	Venue	Referee	Attendance
London Skolars	17–30	Barrow Raiders	1 July, 14:00 BST	New River Stadium	Tom Crashley	472
South Wales Scorpions	30–44	Doncaster	1 July, 14:00 BST	The Gnoll	Peter Brooke	360
North Wales Crusaders	20–30	Workington Town	1 July, 14:30 BST	Racecourse Ground	Ronnie Laughton	733
Gateshead Thunder	0–32	Rochdale Hornets	1 July, 15:00 BST	Filtrona Park	Dave Merrick	231
Whitehaven	42-20	Oldham R.L.F.C.	1 July, 15:00 BST	Recreation Ground	Clint Sharrad	641

=== Round 13 ===
Home	Score	Away	Match information
Home	Score	Away	Date and time	Venue	Referee	Attendance
North Wales Crusaders	46–18	Gateshead Thunder	8 July, 15:00 BST	Racecourse Ground	Greg Dolan	719
Workington Town	50–10	South Wales Scorpions	15 July, 13:00 BST	Derwent Park	Joe Cobb	653
Doncaster	28–24	Barrow Raiders	15 July, 15:00 BST	Keepmoat Stadium	Jamie Leahy	997
Oldham R.L.F.C.	25–24	London Skolars	15 July, 15:00 BST	Whitebank Stadium	Chris Leatherbarrow	487
Rochdale Hornets	12-31	Whitehaven	29 July, 15:00 BST	Spotland Stadium	Warren Turley	581

=== Round 14 ===
Home	Score	Away	Match information
Home	Score	Away	Date and time	Venue	Referee	Attendance
Barrow Raiders	48–16	Whitehaven	19 July, 19:00 BST	Craven Park	Chris Leatherbarrow	1,710
Gateshead Thunder	16–64	London Skolars	22 July, 15:00 BST	Filtrona Park	Tom Crashley	186
Rochdale Hornets	34–6	North Wales Crusaders	22 July, 15:00 BST	Spotland Stadium	Clint Sharrad	648
South Wales Scorpions	12–44	Oldham R.L.F.C.	22 July, 15:00 BST	The Gnoll	Peter Brooke	196
Doncaster	22–6	Workington Town	26 July, 19:30 BST	Keepmoat Stadium	Matt Thomason	972

=== Round 15 ===
Home	Score	Away	Match information
Home	Score	Away	Date and time	Venue	Referee	Attendance
Barrow Raiders	42–16	Oldham R.L.F.C.	5 August, 15:00 BST	Craven Park	Peter Brooke	1,337
Gateshead Thunder	24–22	Workington Town	29 August, 20:00 BST^{C}	Thunderdome	Dave Sharpe	256
London Skolars	56–36	Rochdale Hornets	5 August, 15:00 BST	New River Stadium	Joe Cobb	407
South Wales Scorpions	24–36	North Wales Crusaders	5 August, 15:00 BST	The Gnoll	Clint Sharrad	687
Whitehaven	25–18	Doncaster	5 August, 15:00 BST	Recreation Ground	Warren Turley	652

=== Round 16 ===
Home	Score	Away	Match information
Home	Score	Away	Date and time	Venue	Referee	Attendance
North Wales Crusaders	40–22	London Skolars	12 August, 14:30 BST	Racecourse Ground	Gareth Hewer	800
Oldham R.L.F.C.	22–46	Doncaster	12 August, 15:00 BST	Whitebank Stadium	Matthew Kidd	500
Rochdale Hornets	42-12	South Wales Scorpions	12 August, 15:00 BST	Spotland Stadium	Dave Merrick	311
Whitehaven	60–12	Gateshead Thunder	12 August, 15:00 BST	Recreation Ground	Tom Crashley	648
Workington Town	48–34	Barrow Raiders	12 August, 15:00 BST	Derwent Park	Chris Leatherbarrow	1,710

=== Round 17 ===
Home	Score	Away	Match information
Home	Score	Away	Date and time	Venue	Referee	Attendance
Doncaster	48–12	North Wales Crusaders	19 August, 15:00 BST	Keepmoat Stadium	Dave Merrick	891
Oldham R.L.F.C.	28–18	Workington Town	19 August, 15:00 BST	Whitebank Stadium	Joe Cobb	538
Rochdale Hornets	24–18	Barrow Raiders	19 August, 15:00 BST	Spotland Stadium	Peter Brooke	446
South Wales Scorpions	32–10	Gateshead Thunder	19 August, 15:00 BST	The Gnoll	Greg Dolan	219
London Skolars	41–26	Whitehaven	24 August, 19:30 BST	New River Stadium	Warren Turley	1,174

=== Round 18 ===
Home	Score	Away	Match information
Home	Score	Away	Date and time	Venue	Referee	Attendance
Barrow Raiders	34–22	South Wales Scorpions	2 September, 15:00 BST	Craven Park	Matthew Kidd	1,245
Gateshead Thunder	12–56	Oldham R.L.F.C.	2 September, 15:00 BST	Thunderdome	Ronnie Laughton	273
London Skolars	8–48	Doncaster	2 September, 15:00 BST	New River Stadium	Peter Brooke	578
Whitehaven	58–20	North Wales Crusaders	2 September, 15:00 BST	Recreation Ground	Chris Leatherbarrow	701
Workington Town	48–18	Rochdale Hornets	2 September, 15:00 BST	Derwent Park	Warren Turley	514

== Play-offs ==
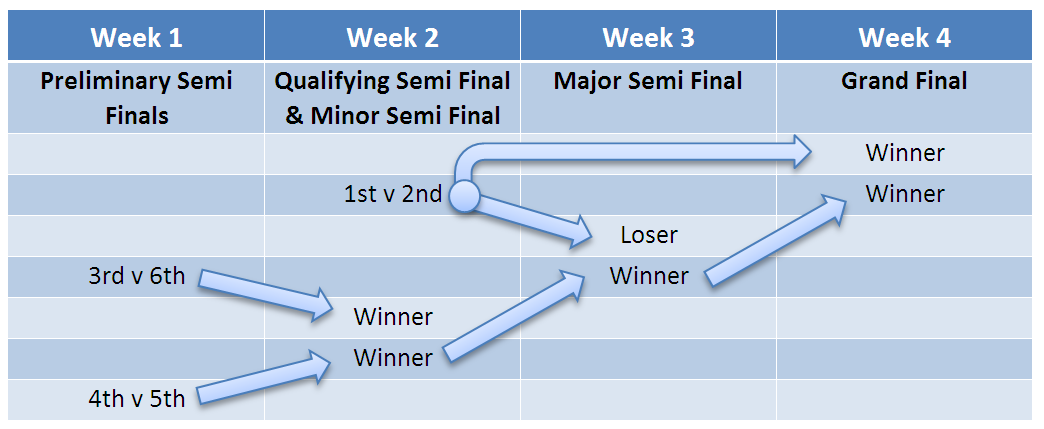
The 2012 Co-Operative Championship 1 Play-off structure

The play-offs commence following the conclusion of the regular season and include the top six sides from the league and uses a top 6 play-off system, culminating in the grand final at the Halliwell Jones Stadium in Warrington, home of Super League side Warrington Wolves.

=== Preliminary Semi-finals ===
#	Home	Score	Away	Match information
#	Home	Score	Away	Date and time	Venue	Referee	Attendance
P1	Workington Town	34–29	Oldham R.L.F.C.	9 September 2012, 15:00 BST	Derwent Park	Gareth Hewer	563
P2	Whitehaven	40–12	Rochdale Hornets	9 September 2012, 15:00 BST	Recreation Ground	Matt Thomason	601

=== Qualifying and minor semi-final ===
#	Home	Score	Away	Match information
#	Home	Score	Away	Date and time	Venue	Referee	Attendance
QS	Doncaster	20–22	Barrow Raiders	16 September 2012, 15:00 BST	Keepmoat Stadium	Matt Thomason	744
MS	Workington Town	26–2	Whitehaven	16 September 2012, 16:00 BST^{D}	Derwent Park	Robert Hicks	1,273

=== Major semi-final ===
#	Home	Score	Away	Match information
#	Home	Score	Away	Date and time	Venue	Referee	Attendance
SF	Doncaster	20–0	Workington Town	23 September 2012, 15:00 BST	Keepmoat Stadium	Jamie Leahy

=== Grand final ===
#	Home	Score	Away	Match information
#	Home	Score	Away	Date and time	Venue	Referee	Attendance
GF	Barrow Raiders	13–16	Doncaster	30 September 2012, 14:00 BST	Halliwell Jones Stadium, Warrington	Jamie Leahy	6,409

=== Play-off ladder ===
Elimination play-offs
9 September 2012
3	Workington Town	34
6	Oldham R.L.F.C.	29
9 September 2012
4	Whitehaven	40
5	Rochdale Hornets	12

Qualifying/elimination semifinal
16 September 2012
1	Doncaster	20
2	Barrow Raiders	22
16 September 2012
Workington Town	26
Whitehaven	2

Elimination final
23 September 2012
Doncaster	20
Workington Town	0

Grand final
30 September 2012, Halliwell Jones Stadium
Barrow Raiders	13
Doncaster	16

== Notes ==
A. Match originally scheduled for 13 May but postponed due to health and safety reasons
B. Match rescheduled from 20 May due to Gateshead reseeding pitch
C. Match rescheduled from 5 August due to waterlogged pitch
D. Match originally scheduled for 15:00 but kick-off delayed by an hour
