= 2016 League 1 Cup =

- Duration: 4 Rounds
- Number of teams: 16

The 2016 League 1 Cup known as the 2016 iPro Sport cup for sponsorship reasons is the second playing of the competition, first played in 2015.

The competition is for the rugby league clubs in the British League 1 - the third tier of rugby league in Britain. As there are 15 teams in League 1 but French club Toulouse Olympique declined to enter the tournament, two amateur teams were invited into the competition to bring the numbers to 16. In 2016 these clubs were Wath Brow Hornets and Leigh Miners Rangers.

== Teams ==
Team	Appearance	First appearance	Last appearance
Barrow Raiders	2nd	2015	2015
Coventry Bears	2nd	2015	2015
Doncaster	1st	2016	N/A
Gloucestershire All Golds	2nd	2015	2015
Hemel Stags	2nd	2015	2015
Hunslet Hawks	1st	2016	N/A
Keighley Cougars	2nd	2015	2015
Leigh Miners Rangers	1st	2016	N/A
London Skolars	2nd	2015	2015
Newcastle Thunder	2nd	2015	2015
North Wales Crusaders	2nd	2015	2015
Oxford	2nd	2015	2015
Rochdale Hornets	2nd	2015	2015
South Wales Scorpions	2nd	2015	2015
Wath Brow Hornets	1st	2016	N/A
York City Knights	2nd	2015	2015

== First round ==
The first round draw of the 2016 iPro Sport Cup was broadcast live on BBC Radio Newcastle on Thursday November 26 from 6.45pm. Last year's winners, North Wales Crusaders, joined the other 13 Kingstone Press League 1 clubs and Kingstone Press National Conference League teams Leigh Miners Rangers and Wath Brow Hornets in the bag from which eight ties played over the weekend of February 20–21 will be selected.

The draw was made by former England, Huddersfield Giants, Hull FC and York City Knights player Chris Thorman and BBC Newcastle presenter and former footballer John Anderson . For the first round the teams were split into two pools – Pool A (Northern regions) and Pool B (Midlands and Southern regions).

=== Pool A ===
Home	Score	Away	Match information
Home	Score	Away	Date and time	Venue	Referee	Attendance
Wath Brow Hornets	4 – 10	Keighley Cougars	20 February 2016, 14:30	Cleator Moor	C Straw	300
Newcastle Thunder	36 – 12	Leigh Miners Rangers	20 February 2016, 18:30	Kingston Park	T Crashley	200
Hunslet Hawks	4 – 24	York City Knights	21 February 2016, 15:00	South Leeds Stadium	D Merrick	464
Doncaster	35 – 28	North Wales Crusaders	21 February 2016, 15:00	Keepmoat Stadium	A Sweet	513
Barrow Raiders	4 – 14	Rochdale Hornets	21 February 2016, 15:30	Craven Park	S Mikalauskas	659

=== Pool B ===
Home	Score	Away	Match information
Home	Score	Away	Date and time	Venue	Referee	Attendance
London Skolars	44 – 6	South Wales Scorpions	20 February 2016, 16:00	New River Stadium	J Smith	100
Coventry Bears	24 – 48	Gloucestershire All Golds	21 February 2016, 14:00	Butts Park Arena	T Grant	146
Oxford Rugby League	34 – 12	Hemel Stags	21 February 2016, 14:30	Maidenhead RFC	G Hewer	155

== Second round ==
The second round draw took place on Sunday February 21 live on BBC Radio Leeds. Home teams were drawn by former Great Britain and Leeds Rhinos player Francis Cummins; the away teams by BBC Radio Leeds presenter James Deighton.

Home	Score	Away	Match information
Home	Score	Away	Date and time	Venue	Referee	Attendance
Doncaster	12 – 24	London Skolars	3 April 2016, 15:00	Keepmoat Stadium	J Roberts	367
Keighley Cougars	54 – 14	Oxford Rugby League	3 April 2016, 15:00	Cougar Park	C Straw	402
Rochdale Hornets	16 – 40	York City Knights	3 April 2016, 15:00	Spotland Stadium	A Sweet	451
Gloucestershire All Golds	36 – 28	Newcastle Thunder	3 April 2016, 15:00	Prince of Wales Stadium	S Mikalauskas	102

== Semi finals ==
The draw for the semi-finals was made on 3 April 2016.

Home	Score	Away	Match information
Home	Score	Away	Date and time	Venue	Referee	Attendance
London Skolars	22 – 31	Keighley Cougars	30 April 2016, 14:30	New River Stadium	Tom Grant	436
York City Knights	58 – 14	Gloucestershire All Golds	1 May 2016, 15:00	Bootham Crescent	Scott Mikalauskas	469

== Final ==
Home	Score	Away	Match information
Home	Score	Away	Date and time	Venue	Referee	Attendance
Keighley Cougars	22 – 18	York City Knights	28 May 2016, 12:00	Bloomfield Road, Blackpool	Scott Mikalauskas
