= 2015 Championship 1 =

- League: Championship 1
- Duration: 22 matches
- Teams: 14
- Highest attendance: 4,066; Keighley Cougars vs Coventry Bears (10/05/15)
- Lowest attendance: 115; London Skolars vs Keighley Cougars (31/08/15)

2015 Season
- Champions: Oldham
- Promotion Playoff Winner: Swinton Lions

The 2015 Championship 1, known as the Kingstone Press League 1 for sponsorship reasons, was a semi-professional rugby league football competition played in England, the third tier of the sport in the country.

The 2015 Championship 1 featured fourteen teams, who all played each other once; Each team then played nine other teams again, based on a geographical basis, totalling 22 games. Two teams were promoted from Championship 1, due to the restructure of Super League, Championship and Championship 1. After the 22 regular season games, the top two sides faced each other and the winner was automatically be promoted to the Kingstone Press Championship as champions, while the loser and the teams finishing 3rd, 4th and 5th contested the play-offs and the winner was also promoted. There is no relegation from this league as it is the lowest tier of professional rugby league.

== 2015 structure ==
The competition featured the eight teams that did not win promotion in 2014: Gloucestershire All Golds, Hemel Stags, London Skolars, Newcastle Thunder, Oldham R.L.F.C., Oxford RLFC, South Wales Scorpions and York City Knights. It also featured five teams relegated from the RFL Championship: Barrow Raiders, Keighley Cougars, North Wales Crusaders, Rochdale Hornets and Swinton Lions. Coventry Bears were also accepted into the division, creating a fourteen-team division.

Team & current season	2014 Position	Stadium	Capacity	Location
Barrow Raiders	14th (Championship)	Craven Park	7,600	Barrow-in-Furness, Cumbria
Coventry Bears	N/A	Butts Park Arena	4,000	Coventry, West Midlands
Gloucestershire All Golds	6th	Prince of Wales Stadium	480	Cheltenham, Gloucestershire
Hemel Stags	5th	Pennine Way	2,000	Hemel Hempstead, Hertfordshire
Keighley Cougars	8th (Championship)	Cougar Park	7,800	Keighley, West Yorkshire
London Skolars	7th	New River Stadium	5,000	Haringey, London
Newcastle Thunder	4th	Kingston Park	10,200	Newcastle upon Tyne, Tyne and Wear
North Wales Crusaders	11th (Championship)	Racecourse Ground	10,500 (15,500 with The Kop open)	Wrexham, Wales
Oldham	3rd	Whitebank Stadium	1,500 (temporary capacity)	Limeside, Oldham, Greater Manchester
Oxford RLFC	8th	Iffley Road	500	Oxford, Oxfordshire
Rochdale Hornets	12th (Championship)	Spotland	10,249	Rochdale, Greater Manchester
South Wales Scorpions	9th	Llynfi Road	6,000	Maesteg, Bridgend, Wales
Swinton Lions	13th (Championship)	Park Lane	3,000	Whitefield, Greater Manchester
York City Knights	1st	Huntington Stadium	3,428	York, North Yorkshire

== Season table ==
2015 Championship 1
Pos	Team	Pld	W	L	D	PF	PA	PD	Pts	Qualification
1	Oldham (C, P)	22	19	3	0	840	362	+478	38	Qualified for Grand Final
2	Keighley Cougars	22	18	4	0	759	400	+359	36	Qualified for Grand Final
3	Swinton Lions (P)	22	16	5	1	899	402	+497	33	Qualified for play-offs
4	York City Knights	22	16	6	0	816	382	+434	32	Qualified for play-offs
5	North Wales Crusaders	22	14	7	1	677	391	+286	29	Qualified for play-offs
6	Rochdale Hornets	22	14	8	0	731	459	+272	28	
7	Barrow Raiders	22	14	8	0	661	423	+238	28	
8	Newcastle Thunder	22	11	11	0	555	552	+3	22	
9	Gloucestershire All Golds	22	8	14	0	562	677	−115	16	
10	Oxford RLFC	22	7	15	0	453	948	−495	14	
11	London Skolars	22	5	17	0	388	671	−283	10	
12	Coventry Bears	22	5	17	0	430	775	−345	10	
13	Hemel Stags	22	5	17	0	422	903	−481	10	
14	South Wales Scorpions	22	1	21	0	274	1122	−848	2	

Updated to match(es) played on 14 September 2015 (season complete). Source: rugbyleaguechampionships.co.uk and Rugby League Project.
Rules for classification: 1st on competition points; 2nd on match points difference. Competition points: For win = 2; For draw = 1
(C) Champions; (P) Promoted

== Play-offs ==
- League One Grand Final

#	Home	Score	Away	Match Information
#	Home	Score	Away	Date and Time (Local)	Venue	Referee	Attendance
League One Grand Final
F	Oldham	31 – 20	Keighley Cougars	20 September, 15:00 BST	Whitebank Stadium, Oldham	Mike Woodhead	1,405

- Oldham are League One Champions 2015 and are promoted to the 2016 Championship. Keighley Cougars will enter the play off semi finals for the second promotion place along with teams finishing 3rd, 4th and 5th.
- League One Promotion Play Offs

#	Home	Score	Away	Match Information
#	Home	Score	Away	Date and Time (Local)	Venue	Referee	Attendance
League One Promotion Play Off Semi-finals
SF1	Keighley Cougars	32 – 6	North Wales Crusaders	27 September, 15:00 BST	Cougar Park, Keighley	Stuart Ansell	1,103
SF2	Swinton Lions	18 – 17 (AET)	York City Knights	27 September, 15:00 BST	Park Lane, Swinton	Chris Campbell	684
League One Promotion Play Off Final
F	Keighley Cougars	28 – 29	Swinton Lions	4 October, 14:00 BST	Select Security Stadium, Widnes	Chris Kendall	4,179

- Swinton won the play off final to secure the second and final promotion place to the 2016 Championship.

=== Play-off bracket ===
Promotion Final
1	Oldham	31
2	Keighley Cougars	24

Play-off semi-finals
Keighley Cougars	32
5	North Wales Crusaders	6
3	Swinton Lions	18
4	York City Knights	17

Play-off final
Keighley Cougars	28
Swinton Lions	29
