= 2015 RFL Championship =

- League: Championship
- Duration: 23 Rounds (Followed by a league split into "Super 8's" for 7 more fixtures.)
- Teams: 12
- Highest attendance: 7,439; Leigh Centurions Vs Bradford Bulls
- Lowest attendance: 300; London Broncos Vs Workington Town
- Broadcast partners: Sky Sports

2015 Season
- Champions: Leigh Centurions
- Championship Shield: Featherstone Rovers

Promotion and relegation
- Relegated to League 1: Hunslet Hawks; Doncaster

The 2015 Rugby Football League Championship, known as the Kingstone Press Championship for sponsorship reasons, was a professional rugby league football competition played in the UK, one tier below the Super League.

The 2015 Championship featured twelve teams, who played each other twice in the regular season, once at home and once away, totaling 22 games. The 2015 season also saw for the first time the Summer Bash Weekend, which was played at Bloomfield Road, Blackpool and created an additional round of fixtures. After 23 rounds in both the Championship and the Super League, the two divisions of twelve were split into the Rugby League Super 8s.

Leigh Centurions were the league leaders after 23 rounds and were thus deemed Champions for the 2015 season, while Hunslet Hawks and Doncaster were relegated following the culmination of the Super 8s.

== Teams ==
The competition featured 12 teams, as opposed to the 14 seen in the previous year. The teams consisted of nine of the 14 teams from 2014, the Play-off winner of the 2014 Championship 1 season, which was Hunslet Hawks, and the two sides relegated from 2014 Super League, Bradford Bulls and London Broncos. Keighley Cougars, North Wales Crusaders, Rochdale Hornets, Swinton Lions, and Barrow Raiders who finished in the bottom five in 2015 were relegated into League One for 2015.

Legend
Reigning champions
Promoted
Relegated

Team & Current Season	Stadium	Capacity	2015 Average Crowd	Location
Batley Bulldogs	loverugbyleague.com Stadium	6,000	1,605	Batley, West Yorkshire
Bradford Bulls	Odsal Stadium	27,000	4,360	Bradford, West Yorkshire
Dewsbury Rams	Tetley's Stadium	5,100	1,689	Dewsbury, West Yorkshire
Doncaster	Keepmoat Stadium	15,231	1,595	Doncaster, South Yorkshire
Featherstone Rovers	Bigfellas Stadium	6,750	2,277	Featherstone, West Yorkshire
Halifax	The Shay Stadium	6,561	2,151	Halifax, West Yorkshire
Hunslet Hawks	South Leeds Stadium	4,000	1,437	Leeds, West Yorkshire
Leigh Centurions	Leigh Sports Village	12,700	3,177	Leigh, Greater Manchester
London Broncos	The Hive Stadium	5,176	1,381	Canons Park, London
Sheffield Eagles	Owlerton Stadium	4,000	1,640	Sheffield, South Yorkshire
Whitehaven	Recreation Ground	7,500	1,527	Whitehaven, Cumbria
Workington Town	Derwent Park	10,000	1,448	Workington, Cumbria

Locations of the 2015 RFL Championship teams
Locations of the 2015 RFL Championship teams in West Yorkshire

== Season standings ==
The regular league season saw the 12 teams play each other twice (one home, one away) over 24 matches. The top four teams at the end of the regular season qualified for "The Qualifiers", while the other eight teams contested the "Championship Shield".

Pos	Team	Pld	W	D	L	PF	PA	PD	Pts	Qualification
1	Leigh Centurions	23	21	1	1	972	343	+629	43	The Qualifiers
2	Bradford Bulls	23	18	1	4	828	387	+441	37	The Qualifiers
3	Sheffield Eagles	23	17	0	6	586	451	+135	34	The Qualifiers
4	Halifax	23	16	0	7	646	377	+269	32	The Qualifiers
5	Featherstone Rovers	23	13	0	10	633	565	+68	26	Championship Shield
6	Dewsbury Rams	23	12	1	10	490	461	+29	25	Championship Shield
7	London Broncos	23	12	0	11	538	510	+28	24	Championship Shield
8	Workington Town	23	7	1	15	379	631	−252	15	Championship Shield
9	Batley Bulldogs	23	7	0	16	421	539	−118	14	Championship Shield
10	Whitehaven	23	7	0	16	418	671	−253	14	Championship Shield
11	Hunslet Hawks	23	5	0	18	362	769	−407	10	Championship Shield
12	Doncaster	23	1	0	22	282	851	−569	2	Championship Shield

Source: Rugby League Project
Rules for classification: 1) Points; 2) Points difference; 3) Number of points scored;
- The Qualifiers

The Qualifiers Super 8's saw the bottom 4 teams from Super League table join the top 4 teams from the Championship. The points totals are reset to 0 and each team plays 7 games each, playing every other team once. After 7 games each the teams finishing 1st, 2nd, and 3rd will gain qualification to the 2016 Super League season. The teams finishing 4th and 5th will play in the "Million Pound Game" at the home of the 4th place team which will earn the winner a place in the 2016 Super League; the loser, along with teams finishing 6th, 7th and 8th, will be relegated to the Championship.

Pos	Team	Pld	W	D	L	PF	PA	PD	Pts	Qualification
1	Hull Kingston Rovers	7	7	0	0	234	118	+116	14	2016 Super League
2	Widnes Vikings	7	5	0	2	232	70	+162	10	2016 Super League
3	Salford City Reds	7	5	0	2	239	203	+36	10	2016 Super League
4	Wakefield Trinity Wildcats (W)	7	3	0	4	153	170	−17	6	Million Pound Game
5	Bradford Bulls	7	3	0	4	167	240	−73	6	Million Pound Game
6	Halifax	7	2	0	5	162	186	−24	4	2016 Championship
7	Sheffield Eagles	7	2	0	5	152	267	−115	4	2016 Championship
8	Leigh Centurions	7	1	0	6	146	231	−85	2	2016 Championship

Source: Rugby League Project
Rules for classification: 1) Points; 2) Points difference; 3) Number of points scored;
(W) Million Pound Game Winner

#	Home	Score	Away	Match Information
#	Home	Score	Away	Date and Time (Local)	Venue	Referee	Attendance
Million Pound Game
F	Wakefield Trinity Wildcats	24 – 16	Bradford Bulls	3 October, 14:50 BST	Belle Vue	R. Silverwood	7,246

- Therefore, Wakefield are the final team to secure a spot in Super League XXI.
- Championship Shield

The third of the three "Super 8" groups saw teams finishing 5th to 12th in the regular Championship table. Like the Super League 8's, these teams retained their original points and played 7 extra games, with the teams finishing in the top 4 places after these extra games contesting playoffs similar to Super League, with 1st v 4th and 2nd vs 3rd, with the winners contesting the Championship Shield Grand Final. The two teams finishing at the bottom of this Super 8s group (7th and 8th) were relegated to the League 1 2016 season, and replaced by the two 2015 League One promoted sides.

Position	Club	Played	Won	Drawn	Lost	Pts for	Pts agst	Points
1	Featherstone Rovers (Q)	30	19	0	11	809	701	38
2	Dewsbury Rams (Q)	30	17	1	12	686	624	35
3	London Broncos (Q)	30	15	0	15	756	674	30
4	Workington Town (Q)	30	11	1	18	587	782	23
5	Batley Bulldogs	30	10	0	20	645	707	20
6	Whitehaven	30	10	0	20	618	921	20
7	Hunslet Hawks (R)	30	8	0	22	518	957	16
8	Doncaster (R)	30	2	0	28	401	1128	4

(Q) Qualified for the semi-final (R) Relegated to League 1

Teams qualifying for the Championship Shield 2015 Semi-Finals.
Teams relegated to 2016 League One.

#	Home	Score	Away	Match Information
#	Home	Score	Away	Date and Time (Local)	Venue	Referee	Attendance
CHAMPIONSHIP SHIELD SEMI-FINALS
SF1	Featherstone Rovers	52 – 14	Workington Town	27 September, 15:00	Post Office Road, Featherstone		1,233
SF1	Dewsbury Rams	18 – 34	London Broncos	27 September, 15:00.	Tetley's Stadium, Dewsbury		940
CHAMPIONSHIP SHIELD GRAND FINAL
F	Featherstone Rovers	34 – 6	London Broncos	Sunday 4 October, 4:30pm	Select Security Stadium	Chris Campbell	4,179

== See also ==
- Championship
- 2014 Championship 1
- British rugby league system
- Super League
- Rugby League Conference
- Northern Ford Premiership
- National League Cup
