= 2014 Championship 1 =

- League: Championship 1
- Duration: 20 matches
- Teams: 9

2014 Season
- Champions: Hunslet Hawks
- League Leaders: York City Knights

The 2014 Championship 1, known as the Kingstone Press Championship 1 for sponsorship reasons, was a semi-professional rugby league football competition played in England, the third tier of the sport in the country.

One team was promoted from Championship 1, due to the restructure of Super League and the Championship, The top five sides contested the play-offs and the winner was promoted. There is no relegation from this league as it is the lowest tier of professional rugby league.

The only cup competition the teams competed in was the 2014 Challenge Cup after the Northern Rail Cup was scrapped for 2014.

== 2014 structure ==
The competition featured the seven teams that did not win promotion at the end of 2012 Championship 1: Gateshead Thunder, Gloucestershire All Golds, Hemel Stags, London Skolars, Oldham, Oxford Rugby League and South Wales Scorpions. The two new teams to the division for 2014 were Hunslet Hawks and York City Knights, who were relegated from the RFL Championship.

| Team & current season | 2013 Position | Stadium | Capacity | Location |
|---|---|---|---|---|
| Gateshead Thunder | 7th | Thunderdome | 11,800 | Gateshead, Tyne and Wear |
| Gloucestershire All Golds | 9th | Prince of Wales Stadium | 480 | Cheltenham, Gloucestershire |
| Hemel Stags | 5th | Pennine Way | 2,000 | Hemel Hempstead, Hertfordshire |
| Hunslet Hawks | 13th (Championship) | South Leeds Stadium | 4,000 | Hunslet, West Yorkshire |
| London Skolars | 4th | New River Stadium (March to May); Queen Elizabeth II Stadium (May to August) | 5,000; 2,500 | Haringey, London; Enfield, London |
| Oldham | 2nd | Whitebank Stadium | 1,500 (temporary capacity) | Limeside, Oldham, Greater Manchester |
| Oxford RLFC | 6th | Iffley Road | 500 | Oxford, Oxfordshire |
| South Wales Scorpions | 8th | Llynfi Road | 6,000 | Maesteg, Bridgend, Wales |
| York City Knights | 14th (Championship) | Huntington Stadium | 3,428 | York, North Yorkshire |

== Season table ==
2014 Championship 1
| Pos | Team | Pld | W | L | D | PF | PA | PD | BP | Pts | Qualification |
|---|---|---|---|---|---|---|---|---|---|---|---|
| 1 | York City Knights | 20 | 17 | 3 | 0 | 738 | 367 | +371 | 3 | 54 | Qualified for play-offs |
| 2 | Hunslet Hawks | 20 | 15 | 5 | 0 | 716 | 249 | +467 | 4 | 49 | Qualified for promotion |
| 3 | Oldham | 20 | 15 | 4 | 1 | 675 | 457 | +218 | 1 | 48 | Qualified for play-offs |
| 4 | Gateshead Thunder | 20 | 11 | 9 | 0 | 615 | 576 | +39 | 3 | 36 | Qualified for play-offs |
| 5 | Hemel Stags | 20 | 8 | 10 | 2 | 482 | 521 | −39 | 5 | 33 | Qualified for play-offs |
| 6 | Gloucestershire All Golds | 20 | 8 | 12 | 0 | 446 | 616 | −170 | 5 | 29 | |
| 7 | London Skolars | 20 | 5 | 15 | 0 | 471 | 647 | −176 | 9 | 24 | |
| 8 | Oxford RLFC | 20 | 7 | 12 | 1 | 493 | 679 | −186 | 1 | 24 | |
| 9 | South Wales Scorpions | 20 | 2 | 18 | 0 | 304 | 828 | −524 | 4 | 10 | |

Source: rugbyleaguechampionships.co.uk and Rugby League Project.
Rules for classification: 1st on competition points; 2nd on match points difference.
Competition points: For win = 3; For draw = 2; For loss by 12 points or fewer = 1

== Season results ==
The regular league season was played over 24 rounds. Each of the nine teams played each other twice (one home, one away), played four additional matches, and had four byes. At the end of the season, five teams contested a playoff for a place in the new Championship structure. Five clubs were relegated to the Championship 1 from the Championship.
