= 2013 Championship 1 =

- League: Championship 1
- Duration: 16 matches (over 18 rounds)
- Teams: 9
- Highest attendance: 1,562 North Wales Crusaders v South Wales Scorpions (1 September 2013)
- Lowest attendance: 103 Gloucestershire All Golds v London Skolars (28 July 2013)
- Average attendance: 477
- Total attendance: 33,374
- Broadcast partners: Premier Sports

2013 Season
- North Wales Crusaders
- Playoff Winner: Rochdale Hornets
- Top point-scorer: Dylan Skee (176)
- Top try-scorer: Rob Massam (18)

The 2013 Championship 1, known as the Kingstone Press Championship 1 for sponsorship reasons, was a semi-professional rugby league football competition played in England and Wales, the third tier of the sport in the country. The 2013 season will see three new teams enter the division alongside the six remaining teams that were not promoted during the 2012 season. Coventry, who had been considered for entry into the division for 2013, will enter the division in 2014. This means that the 2013 Championship 1 season will consist of 9 teams.

The promotion/relegation positions and the play-off format also revert to the normal formats, following the change for the 2012 season to allow the top four teams to be promoted to the Rugby Football League Championship and the champions of the division to be decided by a six-team play-off. This will mean two teams relegated from the 2013 RFL Championship and two teams promoted from Championship 1, which will be the team who finishes top of the league and winner of the play-offs. There is no relegation from this league as it is the lowest tier of professional rugby league.

All of the teams competed in the 2013 Challenge Cup and the 2013 National League Cup.

== 2013 structure ==
The competition features the six teams that did not win promotion in 2012. They are Gateshead Thunder, London Skolars, North Wales Crusaders, Oldham, Rochdale Hornets and South Wales Scorpions. The four teams who were promoted, Barrow Raiders, Doncaster, Whitehaven and Workington Town are replaced by three new teams, which are Hemel Stags, Oxford RLFC and University of Gloucestershire All Golds.

A fourth team had been originally planned for entry for the 2013 to be the tenth team of the division. Northampton Rebels had been the original first team chosen in December 2011 to enter the division for 2013 but withdrew on 26 August 2012, due to Northampton Town FC (who were setting up and running the team) not wanting to launch a team that they thought had no chance of success. Coventry Bears, who was part of the application process for entry to Championship 1, was chosen to be the tenth team in September 2012, however the club will enter in 2014, to be given more time to prepare for entry to a semi-professional competition.

Championship 1
| Team & current season | 2012 Position | Stadium | Capacity | Location |
|---|---|---|---|---|
| Gateshead Thunder | 10th | Thunderdome | 11,800 | Gateshead, Tyne and Wear |
| Gloucestershire All Golds | N/A | Prince of Wales Stadium | 480 | Cheltenham, Gloucestershire |
| Hemel Stags | N/A | Pennine Way | 2,000 | Hemel Hempstead, Hertfordshire |
| London Skolars | 7th | New River Stadium | 5,000 | Haringey, London |
| North Wales Crusaders | 8th | Racecourse Ground | 10,500 (15,500 with The Kop open) | Wrexham, Wales |
| Oldham | 6th | Whitebank Stadium | 1,500 (temporary capacity) | Limeside, Oldham, Greater Manchester |
| Oxford RLFC | N/A | Iffley Road | 500 | Oxford, Oxfordshire |
| Rochdale Hornets | 5th | Spotland | 10,249 | Rochdale, Greater Manchester |
| South Wales Scorpions | 9th | The Gnoll | 6,000 | Neath, West Glamorgan, Wales |

== Season table ==
2013 Championship 1
| Pos | Team | Pld | W | D | L | PF | PA | PD | BP | Pts | Qualification |
|---|---|---|---|---|---|---|---|---|---|---|---|
| 1 | North Wales Crusaders (P) | 16 | 14 | 0 | 2 | 568 | 212 | +356 | 1 | 43 | Qualified for promotion |
| 2 | Oldham | 16 | 12 | 1 | 3 | 508 | 289 | +219 | 3 | 41 | Qualified for play-offs |
| 3 | Rochdale Hornets | 16 | 10 | 0 | 6 | 538 | 375 | +163 | 2 | 32 | Qualified for play-offs |
| 4 | London Skolars | 16 | 9 | 1 | 6 | 489 | 468 | +21 | 3 | 32 | Qualified for play-offs |
| 5 | Hemel Stags | 16 | 8 | 0 | 8 | 381 | 365 | +16 | 4 | 28 | Qualified for play-offs |
| 6 | Oxford RLFC | 16 | 5 | 2 | 9 | 326 | 436 | −110 | 4 | 23 | Qualified for play-offs |
| 7 | Gateshead Thunder | 16 | 4 | 1 | 11 | 356 | 542 | −186 | 6 | 20 | |
| 8 | South Wales Scorpions | 16 | 5 | 0 | 11 | 368 | 504 | −136 | 4 | 19 | |
| 9 | Gloucestershire All Golds | 16 | 2 | 1 | 13 | 286 | 629 | −343 | 4 | 12 | |

Updated to match(es) played on 1 September 2013. Source: rugbyleaguechampionships.co.uk and Rugby League Project.
Rules for classification: 1st on competition points; 2nd on match points difference.
Competition points: For win = 3; For draw = 2; For loss by 12 points or fewer = 1
(P) Promoted

== Season results ==
The regular league season sees the 9 teams play each other twice (one home, one away) over 16 matches, which will be played over 18 rounds, with each team getting two rounds off. The team that finishes first will be promoted to the Championship, while the teams who finish second to sixth at the end of the regular season goes through to the play-offs to determine the second promotion place.
