= Jy-mel Coleman =

Jamaica international rugby league footballer & coach

Personal information
- Full name: Jy-mel Arron Coleman
- Born: 13 October 1988 (age 37) Leeds, West Yorkshire, England

Playing information
- Position: Stand-off, Scrum-half, Loose forward, Hooker
Club
Years	Team	Pld	T	G	FG	P
2009	London Skolars	9	0	0	0	0
2010	York City Knights	1	0	0	0	0
2010–11	London Skolars	23	10	8	0	56
2011–12	Keighley Cougars	25	9	4	1	45
2013	Dewsbury Rams	10	5	5	1	31
2013–15	Hemel Stags	44	11	17	2	80
2016–18	London Skolars	38	8	23	2	80
2019	Newcastle Thunder	5	0	15	0	30
2019–21	London Skolars	2	1	0	0	4
2021	Hunslet	9	4	19	0	54
	Total	166	48	91	6	380
Representative
Years	Team	Pld	T	G	FG	P
2011–22	Jamaica	9	1	25	0	54

Coaching information
Club
Years	Team	Gms	W	D	L	W%
2023	Keighley Cougars	6	1	0	5	17
- Source: As of 8 August 2026
- Relatives: Jermaine Coleman (brother)

Jy-mel Coleman (born 13 October 1988) is assistant coach of Halifax Panthers, and a former Jamaican international rugby league footballer who has played as a stand-off, scrum-half, hooker or loose forward for a number of clubs.

== Background ==
Coleman was born in Leeds, West Yorkshire, England. He is of Jamaican heritage.

His brother Jermaine Coleman is a fellow Jamaican international.

== Playing career ==
=== Club career ===
Coleman began his career at the London Skolars in 2010

He played for the York City Knights in 2003.

Coleman returned to play for the Skolars between 2010 and 2011.

He moved to the Keighley Cougars for 2011 and 2012.

Coleman moved to the Dewsbury Rams for 2013.

He played for the Hemel Stags between 2013 and 2015.

Coleman returned to play for the London Skolars, staying at the club between 2016 and 2019.

He played for the Gateshead Thunder in 2019.

Coleman again returned to play for the London Skolars in 2019 through to 2021.

He left to play for Hunslet in 2021.

=== International career ===
Coleman represented Great Britain Students in 2010.

He made his international debut for Jamaica in 2011 against South Africa.

In 2022 Coleman was named in the Jamaica squad for the 2021 Rugby League World Cup.

== Coaching career ==
Coleman joined the London Broncos in 2022 as the assistant coach under his brother Jermaine Coleman. Both he and his brother were sacked in May 2022 following poor performances and results.
