= 2014 RFL Championship =

- League: Championship
- Duration: 26 Rounds (Followed by 4 round playoffs)
- Teams: 14
- Broadcast partners: Premier Sports

2014 Season

The 2014 Rugby Football League Championship, known as the Kingstone Press Championship due to sponsorship reasons, was a semi-professional rugby league football competition played in the UK, one tier below the first tier Super League. The 2014 season was the second and final season to consist of a 14-team division following the expansion of the league in 2013.

Relegation to Championship 1 was in place for the 2014 season, along with the play-offs with the format for the play-offs remaining the same with no promotion to the Super League. With two Super League teams relegated in 2014 and the Championship reduced to 12 teams in 2015, as part of the reform of the leagues, five teams were relegated at the end of the regular season with one team promoted at the end of 2014 Championship 1.

== Teams ==
The competition featured 12 of the 14 teams from 2013 plus the Champions and Play-off winner of the 2013 Championship 1 season, which were North Wales Crusaders and Rochdale Hornets. Hunslet Hawks and York City Knights, who finished in the bottom two in 2013 were relegated into Championship 1.

Legend
Reigning champions
Defending Northern Rail Cup Champions
Promoted

Team & Current Season	Stadium	Capacity	Location
Barrow Raiders	Craven Park	7,600	Barrow-in-Furness, Cumbria
Batley Bulldogs	loverugbyleague.com Stadium	6,000	Batley, West Yorkshire
Dewsbury Rams	Tetley's Stadium	5,100	Dewsbury, West Yorkshire
Doncaster	Keepmoat Stadium	15,231	Doncaster, South Yorkshire
Featherstone Rovers	Bigfellas Stadium	6,750	Featherstone, West Yorkshire
Halifax	The Shay Stadium	6,561	Halifax, West Yorkshire
Keighley Cougars	Cougar Park	7,800	Keighley, West Yorkshire
Leigh Centurions	Leigh Sports Village	12,700	Leigh, Greater Manchester
North Wales Crusaders	Racecourse Ground	10,500 (15,500 with The Kop open)	Wrexham, Wales
Rochdale Hornets	Spotland	10,249	Rochdale, Greater Manchester
Sheffield Eagles	Owlerton Stadium	4,000	Sheffield, South Yorkshire
Swinton Lions	Leigh Sports Village	12,700	Leigh, Greater Manchester
Whitehaven	Recreation Ground	7,500	Whitehaven, Cumbria
Workington Town	Derwent Park	10,000	Workington, Cumbria

== Season standings ==
2014 RFL Championship
Pos	Team	Pld	W	D	L	PF	PA	PD	BP	Pts	Qualification
1	Leigh Centurions	26	25	0	1	1024	396	+628	1	76	Qualifying for the Play-offs
2	Featherstone Rovers	26	18	1	7	871	532	+339	5	61	Qualifying for the Play-offs
3	Halifax	26	16	2	8	714	504	+210	6	58	Qualifying for the Play-offs
4	Doncaster	26	17	1	8	643	599	+44	4	57	Qualifying for the Play-offs
5	Sheffield Eagles	26	16	0	10	790	605	+185	6	54	Qualifying for the Play-offs
6	Dewsbury Rams	26	15	0	11	669	585	+84	6	51	Qualifying for the Play-offs
7	Workington Town	26	12	1	13	467	524	−57	10	48	Qualifying for the Play-offs
8	Batley Bulldogs	26	12	1	13	582	573	+9	7	45	Qualifying for the Play-offs
9	Whitehaven	26	13	0	13	592	666	−74	6	45	
10	Keighley Cougars	26	12	0	14	587	601	−14	8	44	Relegation position
11	North Wales Crusaders	26	7	0	19	468	709	−241	10	31	Relegation position
12	Rochdale Hornets	26	7	0	19	509	919	−410	4	25	Relegation position
13	Swinton Lions	26	5	0	21	570	865	−295	9	24	Relegation position
14	Barrow Raiders	26	4	0	22	462	870	−408	7	19	Relegation position

Rules for classification: 1st on competition points; 2nd on match points difference.
Competition points: For win = 3; For draw = 2; For loss by 12 points or fewer = 1.

== Season Results ==
The regular league season saw the 14 teams play each other twice (one home, one away) over 26 matches. The top eight teams at the end of the regular season went through to the play-offs to determine the winners of the Championship.

== See also ==
- Championship
- 2014 Championship 1
- British rugby league system
- Super League
- Rugby League Conference
- Northern Ford Premiership
- National League Cup
