= Jermaine Coleman (rugby league) =

Jamaica international rugby league footballer & coach

Personal information
- Full name: Jermaine Coleman
- Born: 17 June 1982 (age 44) Leeds, West Yorkshire, England

Playing information
- Position: Scrum-half, Stand-off
Club
Years	Team	Pld	T	G	FG	P
2001–02	Hunslet Hawks	16	2	2	0	12
2002	Gateshead Thunder	12	2	0	0	8
2003	York City Knights	2	0	0	0	0
2003	Gateshead Thunder	18	0	0	0	0
2004–11	London Skolars	116	19	14	0	104
2013–15	Hemel Stags	20	4	0	0	16
2015–21	London Skolars	46	2	0	0	8
	Total	230	29	16	0	148
Representative
Years	Team	Pld	T	G	FG	P
2017	Jamaica	1	0	0	0	0

Coaching information
Club
Years	Team	Gms	W	D	L	W%
2019–21	London Skolars	41	10	2	29	24
2022	London Broncos	18	3	1	14	17
	Total	59	13	3	43	22
Representative
Years	Team	Gms	W	D	L	W%
2016	Jamaica	2	1	1	0	50
- Source: As of 24 October 2022
- Relatives: Jy-mel Coleman (brother)

Jermaine Coleman (born 17 June 1982) is a rugby league coach who is the lead coach of Jamaica and a former Jamaican international rugby league footballer who played as a stand-off or scrum-half for a number of clubs.

== Background ==
Coleman was born in Leeds, West Yorkshire, England and is Jamaican heritage.

His brother Jy-mel Coleman is a fellow Jamaican international.

He is a teacher.

== Playing career ==
=== Club career ===
Coleman played for the Hunslet Hawks between 2001 and 2002.

He played for the Gateshead Thunder in 2002.

Coleman played for the York City Knights in 2003.

He played for the Gateshead Thunder in 2003.

Coleman played for the London Skolars between 2004 and 2011.

He played for the Hemel Stags as a player-coach between 2013 and 2015.

Coleman re-joined the London Skolars, this time as a player-coach in 2015, before ending his playing career in 2021.

=== International career ===
Coleman represented the Academic Lions in 2003.

He earned his one and only test cap for Jamaica in 2017 against France.

== Coaching career ==
=== Club career ===
Coleman was appointed as Head Coach of London Skolars on 18 March 2015, a position he held until the end of the 2021 season as cited at https://www.skolarsrl.com/2015/03/18/skolars-announce-former-player-jermaine-coleman-as-new-head-coach/

He took over at the London Broncos in the Championship following their move to Plough Lane ahead of their 2022 season.

Owner David Hughes claimed to have found the "ideal man" and that "he will use his knowledge of the lower divisions and part-time environments to help us create a strong group of players" as cited in https://www.loverugbyleague.com/post/new-london-coach-jermaine-coleman-wants-to-take-broncos-back-to-super-league

Thus Coleman recruited heavily from the lower leagues. He signed 13 players from London Skolars. Three were former Broncos players in Iliess Macani, Jordan Willams and Dalton Grant, whilst 38 year old Neil Thorman had Super League experience in the distant past. However Paulos Latu, Jacob Thomas, Will Ramsey, Rob Tuliatu, Adam Vranhos, Michael Greenhalgh, Judd Greenhalgh, Lameck Juma and Ronny Palumbo appeared to have only played in the third tier for the Skolars. Other signings like Dan Coates and reserve centre Jude Ferreira seemed also to have played in the lower leagues, as did the likes of Rian Horsman, Max Allen, Jack Howorth and Euan Parke.

London Broncos first game against Widnes with a weak third division standard side saw the Broncos conceding 3 times from the first 4 attacking sets, as cited at https://widnesvikings.co.uk/event/london-broncos-v-widnes-vikings/

By the end of his tenure, the Broncos were in the relegation zone, fielding the likes of 38 year old Halfback Neil Thorman and in very poor form; the team had managed just one win versus Dewsbury and one draw at Barrow from their league games under Coleman as cited at https://www.loverugbyleague.com/post/london-broncos-looking-for-new-full-time-head-coach-as-coleman-departs

He and his brother Jy-Mel were both sacked in May 2022.

=== International career ===
Coleman coached Jamaica for two games in 2016, beating Ireland in Dublin and drawing with Wales.

He is the secondary coach for Jamaica under Director of Rugby Romeo Monteith at the 2021 Rugby League World Cup.
