= Skee =

Skee may refer to:

- Skee, Sweden, a locality in Västra Götaland County, Sweden
- DJ Skee (born 1983), American DJ
- Skee Riegel (1914–2009), American golfer

== People with the surname ==
- Dylan Skee, English rugby league player

== See also ==
- Skee Ball, an arcade game
