= 2016 RFL Championship =

- League: Championship
- Duration: 23 rounds (followed by a league split into "Super 8's" for 7 more fixtures)
- Teams: 12
- Broadcast partners: Sky Sports

2016 season
- Championship winners: Leigh Centurions

Promotion and relegation
- Promoted from RFL Championship: Leigh Centurions
- Relegated to League 1: Workington Town; Whitehaven

The 2016 Rugby Football League Championship, known as Kingstone Press Championship due to sponsorship by Kingstone Press Cider, was a rugby league football competition played in the UK, one tier below the first tier Super League. The 2016 season was the second to consist of a new structure combining the championship and super league divisions three quarters of the way through the season.

The 2016 Championship featured 12 teams, which all played one another twice in the regular season, once at home, and once away, totalling 22 games. The 2016 season also featured the "Summer Bash Weekend" for a second time. This is a 23rd round of fixtures which replicates Super League's Magic Weekend concept for the Championship sides. After these 23 rounds in both the Championship and the Super League, the two divisions of twelve were split into three divisions of eight, the "Super 8's".

Following the split into the Super 8's, the top four teams in the Championship 2016 joined the bottom four teams of the Super League 2016 in the qualifiers. This group saw each team play each other once each, totalling seven extra games, with points reset to zero for the qualifiers. After seven extra rounds, the top three teams earned a place in the Super League competition for 2017, thus either retaining or earning a place in the top competition. The teams finishing 4th and 5th in the qualifiers played off in an extra fixture, hosted by the fourth-place side, for the final place in the 2017 Super League competition. The loser of this fixture, along with teams finishing 6th, 7th, and 8th in the qualifiers, were either relegated to or remained in the Championship for the 2017 season.

Teams finishing after 23 rounds between 5th and 12th in the Championship played in the third of the three "Super 8" groups, "The Championship Shield". This saw each team playing each other once more, but with points from the original season retained. Following the additional seven rounds a four-team play-off took place pitting 1st vs 4th and 2nd vs 3rd, with the winners playing each other in the final to win the new "Championship Shield". The two teams finishing at the bottom of this group of eight were relegated to the 2017 Kingstone Press League One, being replaced by two promoted teams from the 2016 League 1 competition.

Relegation to League 1 was in place for the 2016 season, with the two bottom teams from "The Championship Shield" group after the split suffering the drop, with promotion to the Super League being available to teams finishing in the top four after 23 rounds. All of the teams in the 2016 Championship also competed in the 2016 Challenge Cup, where they entered in the third round.

== Teams ==
This year's competition featured 12 teams. The teams consisted of ten of the 12 teams from 2015, the champion of the 2015 Championship 1 season, Oldham, and the champion of the Championship 1 playoffs, Swinton Lions. Doncaster and Hunslet Hawks, who finished in the bottom two in 2015, were relegated to League One for 2016.

Legend
Reigning Champions
Championship Shield holders
Promoted
Relegated

Team and current season	Stadium	Capacity	Location
Batley Bulldogs	Fox's Biscuits Stadium	7,500	Batley, West Yorkshire
Bradford Bulls	Provident Stadium	27,000	Bradford, West Yorkshire
Dewsbury Rams	Tetley's Stadium	5,800	Dewsbury, West Yorkshire
Featherstone Rovers	Bigfellas Stadium	8,000	Featherstone, West Yorkshire
Halifax	The MBi Shay	14,000	Halifax, West Yorkshire
Leigh Centurions	Leigh Sports Village	12,700	Leigh, Greater Manchester
London Broncos	Trailfinders Sports Ground	3,176	Ealing, London
Oldham	Bower Fold	6,500	Stalybridge, Greater Manchester
Sheffield Eagles	SHU Sports Park	3,000	Sheffield, South Yorkshire
Swinton Lions	Heywood Road	5,400	Sale, Greater Manchester
Whitehaven	Recreation Ground	7,500	Whitehaven, Cumbria
Workington Town	Zebra Claims Stadium	10,000	Workington, Cumbria

Locations of the 2016 RFL Championship teams
Locations of the 2016 RFL Championship teams in West Yorkshire
Locations of the 2016 RFL Championship teams in Greater Manchester

== Table ==
Pos	Team	Pld	W	D	L	PF	PA	PD	Pts	Qualification
1	Leigh Centurions	23	21	1	1	881	410	+471	43	The Qualifiers
2	London Broncos	23	17	0	6	702	444	+258	34	The Qualifiers
3	Batley Bulldogs	23	15	1	7	589	485	+104	31	The Qualifiers
4	Featherstone Rovers	23	15	0	8	595	384	+211	30	The Qualifiers
5	Bradford Bulls	23	13	2	8	717	446	+271	28	Championship Shield
6	Halifax	23	13	1	9	615	484	+131	27	Championship Shield
7	Sheffield Eagles	23	8	0	15	583	617	−34	16	Championship Shield
8	Dewsbury Rams	23	8	0	15	486	603	−117	16	Championship Shield
9	Swinton Lions	23	7	1	15	449	813	−364	15	Championship Shield
10	Oldham	23	7	0	16	401	678	−277	14	Championship Shield
11	Workington Town	23	5	1	17	455	756	−301	11	Championship Shield
12	Whitehaven	23	5	1	17	367	720	−353	11	Championship Shield

Source: Rugby League Project
Rules for classification: 1) Points; 2) Points difference; 3) Number of points scored;

== See also ==
- Championship
- 2015 RFL Championship
- British rugby league system
- Super League
- Rugby League Conference
- Northern Ford Premiership
- National League Cup
