= Gareth Honor =

English rugby league footballer

Personal information
- Full name: Gareth Honor
- Born: 1 October 1981 (age 45) Farnborough, London, England

Playing information
- Position: Hooker
Club
Years	Team	Pld	T	G	FG	P
2002	Batley	5	0	0	0	0
2003–11	London Skolars	198	33	0	1	133
	Total	203	33	0	1	133
- Source: As of 12 May 2021

Gareth Honor (born 1 October 1981 in Farnborough, London, England) is an English former professional rugby league footballer who played in the 2000s and 2010s. He played for London Skolars in National League Two.

Gareth Honor's position of choice is as a hooker.

He was with the London Broncos in the Super League.
