= 2012 RFL Championship =

- League: RFL Championship
- Duration: 18 Rounds (Followed by 4 round playoffs)
- Teams: 10
- Highest attendance: 2,816 Featherstone Rovers v Keighley Cougars (2 September 2012)
- Lowest attendance: 408 Hunslet Hawks v Leigh Centurions (5 August 2012)
- Broadcast partners: Premier Sports

2012 Season
- Grand Final winners: Sheffield Eagles
- League leaders: Featherstone Rovers
- Runners-up: Leigh Centurions
- Top point-scorer: Liam Finn (247)
- Top try-scorer: Andy Kain (22)

The 2012 Rugby Football League Championship, also known as Co-operative Championship due to sponsorship by The Co-operative Group, was a semi-professional rugby league football competition played in the UK, one tier below the first tier Super League. The two worst performing teams during the season usually are relegated to Championship 1, however for the 2012 season, no relegation took place, due to the expansion of the Championship to 14 teams in 2013. The winners of the division is decided by a play-off system involving the top 6 teams at the end of the regular season with two teams eventually progressing to the Grand Final. The final was won by Sheffield Eagles, who beat Featherstone Rovers 20–16 at the Halliwell Jones Stadium.

There was no automatic promotion from this league to Super League, which uses a licensing system renewed every three years. Qualifying for the Grand Final or winning the Northern Rail Cup is a prerequisite for Championship clubs to be able to apply for a licence in the next round of applications for the 2015–17 seasons.

All of the teams in the 2012 Co-operative Championship also competed in the 2012 Challenge Cup, where they entered in the third round. All of the teams also competed in the 2012 National League Cup which started before the Co-operative Championship with the finals held mid season.

== Teams ==
This year's competition featured mostly the same teams as it did in 2011. The Swinton Lions and Keighley Cougars were promoted from the 2011 Championship 1, Widnes Vikings were promoted into Super League after winning a licence for 2012-14 seasons, while Barrow Raiders were relegated. Toulouse Olympique, who finished second bottom the previous season, decided to withdraw from the competition and return to the French Elite One Championship league. The changes means that 10 teams competed in the 2012 season. This will increase to 14 in the 2013 season, which meant no relegation from the Championship for the 2012 season.

Legend
Reigning champions
Defending Northern Rail Cup Champions
Promoted

Team & Current Season	Stadium	Capacity	Location
Batley Bulldogs	Mount Pleasant	6,000	Batley, West Yorkshire
Dewsbury Rams	Tetley's Stadium	3,500	Dewsbury, West Yorkshire
Featherstone Rovers	Bigfellas Stadium	6,750	Featherstone, West Yorkshire
Halifax	The Shay Stadium	6,561	Halifax, West Yorkshire
Hunslet Hawks	South Leeds Stadium	4,000	Leeds, West Yorkshire
Keighley Cougars	Cougar Park	7,800	Keighley, West Yorkshire
Leigh Centurions	Leigh Sports Village	12,700	Leigh, Greater Manchester
Sheffield Eagles	Bramall Lane	32,702	Sheffield, South Yorkshire
Swinton Lions	Leigh Sports Village	12,700	Leigh, Greater Manchester
York City Knights	Huntington Stadium	3,428	York, North Yorkshire

== Season standings ==
2012 RFL Championship
#	Team	Pld	W	D	L	PF	PA	PD	Bns	Pts
1	Featherstone Rovers	18	15	1	2	684	354	+330	0	47
2	Leigh Centurions	18	14	0	4	612	310	+302	2	44
3	Halifax	18	14	0	4	597	377	+220	2	44
4	Sheffield Eagles	18	12	1	5	565	437	+128	3	41
5	Batley Bulldogs	18	11	0	7	551	326	+225	7	40
6	Keighley Cougars	18	8	1	9	395	368	+27	5	31
7	Dewsbury Rams	18	7	0	11	371	518	-147	4	25
8	Swinton Lions	18	4	1	13	366	632	−266	5	19
9	Hunslet Hawks	18	2	0	16	248	684	-436	4	10
10	York City Knights	18	1	0	17	272	645	-373	4	7

Teams qualifying for the Play-offs

This table is correct as of 2 September 2012.

Source: cooperativechampionship.co.uk and BBC Sport.

Classification: 1st on competition points; 2nd on match points difference.

Competition points: For win = 3; For draw = 2; For loss by 12 points or fewer = 1.

== Season results ==
The regular league season sees the 10 teams play each other twice (one home, one away) over 18 matches. The top six teams at the end of the regular season goes through to the play-offs to determine the winners of the Championship.

== Playoffs ==
The Co-operative Championship uses a top 6 play-off system.

Round 1

Sheffield Eagles 42-12 Batley Bulldogs

Halifax 28-24 Keighley Cougars

Round 2

Halifax 12-54 Sheffield Eagles

Featherstone Rovers 32-14 Leigh

Semi Final

Leigh 22-32 Sheffield Eagles

Final

Featherstone Rovers 16-20 Sheffield Eagles

== See also ==
- Co-operative Championship
- 2012 Championship 1
- British rugby league system
- Super League
- Rugby League Conference
- Northern Ford Premiership
- National League Cup
