= 2012 Championship 1 =

- League: Championship 1
- Duration: 18 rounds
- Teams: 10
- Highest attendance: 1,954 Workington Town v Whitehaven (24 June 2012)
- Lowest attendance: 186 Gateshead Thunder v London Skolars (22 July 2012)
- Broadcast partners: Premier Sports

2012 Season
- Doncaster
- Doncaster
- Runners-up: Barrow Raiders
- Top point-scorer: Dylan Skee (194)
- Top try-scorer: Lee Waterman (25)

The 2012 Championship 1 was a semi-professional rugby league football competition played in England and Wales, the third tier of the sport in the country. For one season only, the top four teams (Barrow Raiders, Doncaster, Whitehaven and Workington Town) were promoted to the 2013 Rugby Football League Championship, while the champions of the division were decided by a six-team play-off, which was won by Doncaster, who beat Barrow 16–13 at the Halliwell Jones Stadium.

There was no relegation from this league as it is the lowest tier of professional rugby league. All of the teams competed in the 2012 Challenge Cup and the 2012 National League Cup.

== 2012 structure ==
The competition featured mainly the same teams as it did in 2011. The exceptions being that the Swinton Lions and the Keighley Cougars were both promoted to compete in the 2012 RFL Championship. The Barrow Raiders were relegated from the 2010 RFL Championship, while the North Wales Crusaders enter the division following the collapse of the Crusaders, who lost a Super League licence for the 2012 season.

Championship 1
Team & Current Season	2011 Position	Stadium	Capacity	Location
Barrow Raiders	11th (Championship)	Craven Park	7,600	Barrow-in-Furness, Cumbria
Doncaster	5th	Keepmoat Stadium	15,231	Doncaster, South Yorkshire
Gateshead Thunder	10th	Thunderdome	11,800	Gateshead, Tyne and Wear
London Skolars	9th	New River Stadium	5,000	Haringey, London
North Wales Crusaders	N/A	Racecourse Ground	10,500 (15,500 with The Kop open)	Wrexham, Wales
Oldham	7th	Whitebank Stadium	1500 (temporary capacity)	Limeside, Oldham, Greater Manchester
Rochdale Hornets	4th	Spotland Stadium	10,249	Rochdale, Greater Manchester
South Wales Scorpions	8th	The Gnoll	6,000	Neath, West Glamorgan, Wales
Whitehaven	6th	Recreation Ground	7,500	Whitehaven, Cumbria
Workington Town	2nd	Derwent Park	10,000	Workington, Cumbria

== Season table ==
2012 Championship 1
Pos	Team	Pld	W	D	L	GF	GA	GD	BP	Pts	Qualification
1	Doncaster (P)	18	15	0	3	717	347	+370	1	46	Promotion to 2013 Co-operative Championship and Champions play-offs
2	Barrow Raiders (P)	18	14	0	4	617	383	+234	3	45	Promotion to 2013 Co-operative Championship and Champions play-offs
3	Workington Town (P)	18	13	0	5	617	330	+287	4	43	Promotion to 2013 Co-operative Championship and Champions play-offs
4	Whitehaven R.L.F.C. (P)	18	12	0	6	549	421	+128	1	37	Promotion to 2013 Co-operative Championship and Champions play-offs
5	Rochdale Hornets (Q)	18	9	0	9	496	462	+34	1	28	Champions play-offs
6	Oldham (Q)	18	7	1	10	465	485	−20	5	27	Champions play-offs
7	London Skolars	18	7	1	10	558	560	−2	2	24	
8	North Wales Crusaders	18	7	0	11	460	628	−168	3	24	
9	South Wales Scorpions	18	4	0	14	365	680	−315	4	16	
10	Gateshead Thunder	18	1	0	17	276	824	−548	2	5	

Updated to match(es) played on 2 September 2012. Source: cooperativechampionship.co.uk and BBC Sport.
Rules for classification: 1st on competition points; 2nd on match points difference.
Competition points: For win = 3; For draw = 2; For loss by 12 points or fewer = 1.
(P) Promoted; (Q) Qualified for Playoffs

== Season results ==
The regular league season sees the 10 teams play each other twice (one home, one away) over 18 matches. The top six teams at the end of the regular season goes through to the play-offs to determine the winners of Championship 1.

== See also ==
- Co-operative Championship
- 2012 RFL Championship
- RFL League 1
- 2012 National League Cup
