= Latham Tawhai =

Former New Zealand Māori international rugby league footballer and coach

Personal information
- Full name: Latham Dean Henare Tawhai
- Born: 23 August 1972 (age 54) Auckland, New Zealand
- Height: 175 cm (5 ft 9 in)
- Weight: 82 kg (12 st 13 lb)

Playing information
- Position: Five-eighth, Halfback
Club
Years	Team	Pld	T	G	FG	P
19??	Northcote
1994–96	North Harbour	62	16	51	2	167
1996–97	Keighley Cougars	13	2	0	0	8
1997–99	Hunslet Hawks	77	32	0	11	139
2000–01	Doncaster Dragons	38	21	0	3	87
2001–02	Rochdale Hornets	51	12	2	1	53
2003	Hull Kingston Rovers	26	8	3	4	42
2004	Hunslet Hawks	24	8	5	4	46
2005	Doncaster Lakers	21	3	0	0	12
2006	London Skolars	5	3	0	3	12
	Total	317	105	61	28	566
Representative
Years	Team	Pld	T	G	FG	P
	Auckland
	New Zealand Māori

Coaching information
Club
Years	Team	Gms	W	D	L	W%
2005–07	London Skolars

Latham Tawhai (born 23 August 1972) is a rugby league coach and former player from New Zealand. He has also represented his country in softball. His usual position was at stand-off or scrum-half.

== Playing career ==
A Northcote Tigers junior, Tawhai played in the Auckland Rugby League competition before being selected for Auckland, and making the North Harbour Lion Red Cup side.

After playing for the champion North Harbour Sea Eagles in the Lion Red Cup, Tawhai represented New Zealand at the inaugural Super League World Nines, helping the side to victory before signing for Keighley in 1996. He later went on to play for Hunslet (winning the Tom Bergin Trophy for Man of the Match in the 1999 Grand Final), Rochdale Hornets, Doncaster and Hull Kingston Rovers.

Tawhai then left Hull KR to take up a player-coach role at Hunslet in 2004.

== Coaching career ==
Tawhai was part of the RFL's coaching pathway starting with the Leeds Service Area and Rhinos Scholarship Programme. He went on to assist with the Bradford Bulls Foundation before coaching on the RFL's Elite Player Camps.

In 2005 after guiding local amateur club Drighlington to success in the Pennine Premier League, the Yorkshire Cup Final and winning the Pennine League Coach of the Year, he moved to London where he became the first full-time coach at the London Skolars. In October 2007, after London Skolars best ever season, Latham was named the Co-operative National League Two Coach of the year. He left Skolars at the end of 2007 to become assistant coach at Harlequins RL under Brian McDermott. He remained with the renamed London Broncos until mid-season 2012 when he left the club, moving to Wales for personal and business reasons.

== Other sports ==
Tawhai was a New Zealand Fastpitch softball representative. He went on to play in the United States with the Larry Miller Club in Salt Lake City and make the USA National U23 Tournament Team.

After being resident in the UK for a number of years, he represented Great Britain at the 2004 World Softball Championships.

Tawhai was also an Auckland Rugby Union Junior representative.

Sporting positions
Preceded by	Coach London Skolars; 2005-2007	Succeeded by Tony Benson; 2007-2008
