= Bristol Rugby League =

2019 proposed rugby league team

Bristol Rugby League was a bid to enter a rugby league club based in Bristol who would have competed in League 1 from 2019.

== History ==
In 2017, existing clubs Gloucestershire All Golds and Oxford were both struggling on and off the field. Since entering the professional structure neither club had progressed and when stuck at the bottom of League 1.

With little progress on the pitch and crowds dwindling around 500, both clubs agreed the best option would be to merge and start a new club in Bristol. At the end of the 2017 season it was announced that both clubs would not compete in 2018 and would focus on entering Bristol for 2019.

== See also ==
- Rugby Football League expansion
