= 2012 Championship Cup =

- Teams: 20

2012 season

The 2012 Championship Cup (known for commercial reasons as the Northern Rail Cup) was the 11th season of the rugby league football competition for clubs in Great Britain's Co-operative Championship and Championship One.

In the final staged at Bloomfield Road in Blackpool, Halifax defeated Featherstone Rovers 21-12 to claim the trophy.

== Format ==
The twenty teams were split up into two pools. Each team played two home games and two away games against teams in their pool. The top four teams in each pool following the conclusion of the group stage fixtures then progressed into an open draw for the knock-out quarter-final stage. The competition started on February 5.

Toulouse Olympique competed in this competition despite withdrawing from the Co-operative Championship. All the teams from the Championships competed except for the newly reformed North Wales Crusaders.

== 2012 competition results ==
=== Pool 1 ===
==== Round 1 ====
Home	Score	Away	Match information			
Home	Score	Away	Date & time	Referee	Venue	Attendance
London Skolars	16 – 32	Toulouse Olympique	9 April, 12:30 BST		New River Stadium	0
Keighley Cougars	16 – 22	Batley Bulldogs	12 February, 14:00 GMT	Gareth Hewer	Cougar Park	1,095
Dewsbury Rams	6 – 36	Halifax	12 February, 15:00 GMT	Tim Roby	Tetley's Stadium	1,347
Oldham	0 – 68	Featherstone Rovers	15 February, 20:00 GMT	Jamie Leahy	Whitebank Stadium	672
Rochdale Hornets	0 – 0	South Wales Scorpions	9 May, 20:00 BST		Spotland Stadium	0

==== Round 2 ====
Home	Score	Away	Match information			
Home	Score	Away	Date & time	Referee	Venue	Attendance
Toulouse Olympique	24 – 24	Keighley Cougars	18 February, 19:00 GMT		Stade des Minimes	650
Batley Bulldogs	50 – 16	London Skolars	19 February, 14:30 GMT	Warren Turley	Mount Pleasant	601
Featherstone Rovers	38 – 6	Dewsbury Rams	19 February, 15:00 GMT	Clint Sharrad	Post Office Road	1,943
Halifax	38 – 6	Rochdale Hornets	19 February, 15:00 GMT	Matt Thomason	The Shay	1,881
South Wales Scorpions	36 – 36	Oldham	19 February, 15:00 GMT	Peter Brooke	The Gnoll	849

==== Round 3 ====
Home	Score	Away	Match information			
Home	Score	Away	Date & time	Referee	Venue	Attendance
Batley Bulldogs	34 - 12	Toulouse Olympique	25 February, 14:00 GMT	Greg Dolan	Mount Pleasant	620
Halifax	32 - 34	Featherstone Rovers	26 February, 15:00 GMT	Robert Hicks	The Shay	2,530
Oldham	28 - 30	Dewsbury Rams	26 February, 15:00 GMT		Whitebank Stadium	573
Rochdale Hornets	16 - 40	Keighley Cougars	26 February, 15:00 GMT	George Stokes	Spotland Stadium	604
South Wales Scorpions	30 - 38	London Skolars	26 February, 15:00 GMT	Tom Crashley	The Gnoll	205

==== Round 4 ====
Home	Score	Away	Match information			
Home	Score	Away	Date & time	Referee	Venue	Attendance
Toulouse Olympique	44 - 30	South Wales Scorpions	3 March, 19:00 GMT	Matthew Thomasson	Stade des Minimes	0
Keighley Cougars	26 – 12	Oldham	4 March, 14:00 GMT	Ronnie Laughton	Cougar Park	0
Dewsbury Rams	32 - 10	Rochdale Hornets	4 March, 15:00 GMT	Matthew Kidd	Spotland Stadium	0
Featherstone Rovers	22 - 34	Batley Bulldogs	4 March, 15:00 GMT	Jamie Leahy	Post Office Road	0
London Skolars	12 - 16	Halifax	4 March, 15:00 GMT		New River Stadium	0

==== Pool 1 qualification table ====
2012 Northern Rail Cup: Pool 1
#		PLD	W	D	L	PF	PA	PD	BP	PTS
1	Batley Bulldogs	4	4	0	0	140	66	74	0	12
2	Featherstone Rovers	4	3	0	1	162	72	90	1	10
3	Halifax	4	3	0	1	122	58	64	1	10
4	Keighley Cougars	4	2	1	1	106	74	32	1	9
5	Toulouse Olympique	4	2	1	1	112	104	8	0	8
6	Dewsbury Rams	4	2	0	2	74	112	-38	0	6
7	London Skolars	4	1	0	3	82	128	-46	2	5
8	South Wales Scorpions	3	0	1	2	96	118	-22	1	3
9	Oldham R.L.F.C.	4	0	1	3	76	160	-84	1	3
10	Rochdale Hornets	3	0	0	3	32	110	-78	0	0

Teams qualifying for the next round

Source: Northern Rail Cup Table – The RFL
Classification: 1st on competition points; 2nd on match points difference.
Competition Points: For win = 3; For draw = 2; For loss by 12 points or fewer = 1

=== Pool 2 ===
==== Round 1 ====
Home	Score	Away	Match information			
Home	Score	Away	Date & time	Referee	Venue	Attendance
Gateshead Thunder	10 - 48	Doncaster	15 February, 20:00 GMT		Gateshead International Stadium	243
Hunslet Hawks	34 - 18	Whitehaven	15 February, 19:30 GMT	Dave Merrick	South Leeds Stadium	305
Leigh Centurions	48 - 16	Barrow Raiders	12 February, 15:00 GMT	George Stokes	Leigh Sports Village	1,860
Workington Town	14 - 28	Sheffield Eagles	12 February, 15:00 GMT	Chris Leatherbarrow	Derwent Park	532
York City Knights	30 - 22	Swinton Lions	23 February, 20:00 GMT		Huntington Stadium	504

==== Round 2 ====
Home	Score	Away	Match information			
Home	Score	Away	Date & time	Referee	Venue	Attendance
Barrow Raiders	31 - 24	Workington Town	19 February, 14:00 GMT	Jamie Leahy	Craven Park	1,366
Swinton Lions	18 - 24	Hunslet Hawks	19 February, 14:00 GMT	Thierry Alibert	Leigh Sports Village	475
Doncaster	18 - 29	York City Knights	19 February, 15:00 GMT	Ronnie Laughton	Keepmoat Stadium	418
Sheffield Eagles	23 - 22	Leigh Centurions	19 February, 15:00 GMT	Robert Hicks	Don Valley Stadium	1,045
Whitehaven	44 - 18	Gateshead Thunder	19 February, 15:00 GMT	Gary Dolan	Recreation Ground	649

==== Round 3 ====
Home	Score	Away	Match information			
Home	Score	Away	Date & time	Referee	Venue	Attendance
Barrow Raiders	32 - 16	Swinton Lions	26 February, 14:00 GMT	Dave Merrick	Craven Park	1,083
Doncaster	12 - 56	Sheffield Eagles	26 February, 15:00 GMT	Warren Turley	Keepmoat Stadium	731
Leigh Centurions	30 - 12	Hunslet Hawks	26 February, 15:00 GMT	Chris Leatherbarrow	Leigh Sports Village	1,374
Workington Town	44 - 16	Whitehaven	26 February, 15:00 GMT	Matthew Kidd	Derwent Park	1,147
York City Knights	26 - 22	Gateshead Thunder	26 February, 15:00 GMT	D Sharpe	Huntington Stadium	635

==== Round 4 ====
Home	Score	Away	Match information			
Home	Score	Away	Date & time	Referee	Venue	Attendance
Sheffield Eagles	36 - 4	York City Knights	2 March, 19:30 GMT	Robert Hicks	Don Valley Stadium	0
Swinton Lions	30 - 12	Workington Town	4 March, 14:00 GMT	Clint Sharrad	Leigh Sports Village	0
Gateshead Thunder	0 - 42	Leigh Centurions	4 March, 15:00 GMT	Tom Crashley	Gateshead International Stadium	0
Hunslet Hawks	20 - 10	Doncaster	4 March, 15:00 GMT	Peter Brooke	South Leeds Stadium	0
Whitehaven	10 - 18	Barrow Raiders	4 March, 15:00 GMT		Recreation Ground	0

==== Pool 2 qualification table ====
2012 Northern Rail Cup: Pool 2
#		PLD	W	D	L	PF	PA	PD	BP	PTS
1	Sheffield Eagles	4	4	0	0	143	52	91	0	12
2	Leigh Centurions	4	3	0	1	142	51	91	1	10
3	Hunslet Hawks	4	3	0	1	90	76	14	0	9
4	Barrow Raiders	4	3	0	1	97	98	-1	0	9
5	York City Knights	4	3	0	1	89	98	-9	0	9
6	Swinton Lions	4	1	0	3	86	98	-12	2	5
7	Doncaster	4	1	0	3	88	115	-27	2	5
8	Workington Town	4	1	0	3	94	105	-11	1	4
9	Whitehaven	4	1	0	3	88	112	-24	1	4
10	Gateshead Thunder	4	0	0	4	50	160	-110	0	0

Teams qualifying for the next round

Source: Northern Rail Cup Table – The RFL
Classification: 1st on competition points; 2nd on match points difference.
Competition Points: For win = 3; For draw = 2; For loss by 12 points or fewer = 1

=== Finals ===
==== Finals Tournament bracket ====
Quarter-finals
H	Leigh Centurions	32
A	Batley Bulldogs	12
H	Keighley Cougars	12
A	Featherstone Rovers	60
H	Sheffield Eagles	40
A	Hunslet Hawks	8
H	Halifax RLFC	54
A	Barrow Raiders	24

Semi-finals
H	Featherstone Rovers	54
A	Leigh Centurions	16
H	Sheffield Eagles	22
A	Halifax RLFC	24

Final
N	Featherstone Rovers
N	Halifax RLFC

==== Quarter-finals ====
Home	Score	Away	Match information
Home	Score	Away	Date & time	Referee	Venue	Attendance
Keighley Cougars	12–60	Featherstone Rovers	19:30 BST, 14 June 2012	Jamie Leahy	Cougar Park	828
Sheffield Eagles	40–8	Hunslet Hawks	14:00 BST, 15 June 2012	Ronnie Laughton	Don Valley Stadium	286
Leigh Centurions	32–12	Batley Bulldogs	14:00 BST, 16 June 2012	Clint Sharrad	Leigh Sports Village	2,002
Halifax	54–24	Barrow Raiders	15:00 BST, 16 June 2012		The Shay	1,448

==== Semi-finals ====
Home	Score	Away	Match information
Home	Score	Away	Date & time	Referee	Venue	Attendance
Featherstone Rovers	54–16	Leigh Centurions	19:30 BST, 5 July 2012	Jamie Leahy	Bigfellas Stadium	1,721
Sheffield Eagles	22-24	Halifax	19:30 BST, 6 July 2012	Ronnie Laughton	Don Valley Stadium

==== Final ====
Home	Score	Away	Match information
Home	Score	Away	Date & time	Referee	Venue	Attendance
Featherstone Rovers	12–21	Halifax	15:00 BST, 29 July 2012	Jamie Leahy	Bloomfield Road, Blackpool	6,691
