= 2013 RFL Championship =

- League: Championship
- Duration: 26 Rounds (Followed by 4 round playoffs)
- Teams: 14
- Highest attendance: 3,890 Featherstone Rovers v Sheffield Eagles (28 August 2013)
- Lowest attendance: 375 Hunslet Hawks v Whitehaven (10 March 2013)
- Average attendance: 1,199
- Total attendance: 187,103
- Broadcast partners: (United Kingdom) Premier Sports

2013 Season
- Grand Final winners: Sheffield Eagles
- League Leaders Shield: Featherstone Rovers
- Runners-up: Sheffield Eagles
- Top point-scorer: Liam Finn (308)
- Top try-scorer: Menzie Yere (30)

Promotion and relegation
- Relegated to Championship 1: Hunslet Hawks; York City Knights

The 2013 Rugby Football League Championship, which will be known as Kingstone Press Championship due to sponsorship by Kingstone Press Cider, is a semi-professional rugby league football competition played in the UK, one tier below the first tier Super League. The 2013 season is the first season to consist of a 14-team division. This was achieved by scrapping relegation for the 2012 season and having four teams promoted from the Championship 1.

Relegation to Championship 1 is restored for the 2013 but as in previous years, there is no automatic promotion from this league to Super League, which uses a licensing system renewed every three years. Qualifying for the Grand Final or winning the Northern Rail Cup is a prerequisite for Championship clubs to be able to apply for a licence in the next round of applications for the 2015–17 seasons.

All of the teams in the 2013 Co-operative Championship will also compete in the 2013 Challenge Cup where they will enter in the third round. All of the teams will also compete in the 2013 National League Cup which starts before the Co-operative Championship with the finals held mid season.

== Teams ==
This year's competition features the same 10 teams as it did in 2012 plus the top four teams from the 2012 Championship 1 season, which are Barrow Raiders, Doncaster, Whitehaven and Workington Town.

Legend
Reigning champions
Defending Northern Rail Cup Champions
Promoted

Team & Current Season	Stadium	Capacity	Location
Barrow Raiders	Craven Park	7,600	Barrow-in-Furness, Cumbria
Batley Bulldogs	loverugbyleague.com Stadium	6,000	Batley, West Yorkshire
Dewsbury Rams	Tetley's Stadium	3,500	Dewsbury, West Yorkshire
Doncaster	Keepmoat Stadium	15,231	Doncaster, South Yorkshire
Featherstone Rovers	Bigfellas Stadium	6,750	Featherstone, West Yorkshire
Halifax	The Shay Stadium	6,561	Halifax, West Yorkshire
Hunslet Hawks	South Leeds Stadium	4,000	Leeds, West Yorkshire
Keighley Cougars	Cougar Park	7,800	Keighley, West Yorkshire
Leigh Centurions	Leigh Sports Village	12,700	Leigh, Greater Manchester
Sheffield Eagles	Bramall Lane	32,702	Sheffield, South Yorkshire
Swinton Lions	Leigh Sports Village	12,700	Leigh, Greater Manchester
Whitehaven	Recreation Ground	7,500	Whitehaven, Cumbria
Workington Town	Derwent Park	10,000	Workington, Cumbria
York City Knights	Huntington Stadium	3,428	York, North Yorkshire

== Season standings ==
Pos	Team	Pld	W	D	L	PF	PA	PD	BP	Pts	Qualification
1	Featherstone Rovers	26	22	0	4	940	362	+578	4	70	Qualifying for the play-offs
2	Sheffield Eagles	26	22	0	4	806	474	+332	1	67	Qualifying for the play-offs
3	Halifax	26	19	2	5	817	476	+341	1	62	Qualifying for the play-offs
4	Leigh Centurions	26	18	0	8	752	495	+257	4	58	Qualifying for the play-offs
5	Batley Bulldogs	26	16	1	9	670	394	+276	7	57	Qualifying for the play-offs
6	Doncaster	26	12	1	13	593	594	−1	6	44	Qualifying for the play-offs
7	Dewsbury Rams	26	12	0	14	492	620	−128	6	42	Qualifying for the play-offs
8	Workington Town	26	11	0	15	483	681	−198	6	39	Qualifying for the play-offs
9	Whitehaven	26	11	0	15	485	774	−289	4	37	
10	Swinton Lions	26	9	0	17	516	738	−222	7	34	
11	Keighley Cougars	26	8	0	18	492	719	−227	9	33	
12	Barrow Raiders	26	8	0	18	482	792	−310	9	33	
13	Hunslet Hawks (R)	26	6	0	20	529	704	−175	12	30	Relegation position
14	York City Knights (R)	26	6	0	20	493	727	−234	8	26	Relegation position

Source: rugbyleaguechampionships.co.uk and BBC Sport
Rules for classification: 1st on competition points; 2nd on match points difference.
Competition points: For win = 3; For draw = 2; For loss by 12 points or fewer = 1.
(R) Relegated

== Season results ==
The regular league season sees the 14 teams play each other twice (one home, one away) over 26 matches. The top eight teams at the end of the regular season goes through to the play-offs to determine the winners of the Championship.

== See also ==
- Co-operative Championship
- 2013 Championship 1
- British rugby league system
- Super League
- Rugby League Conference
- Northern Ford Premiership
- National League Cup
