= South Wales Scorpions =

Defunct Welsh professional rugby league club, based latterly in Llanelli

South Wales

Club information
- Full name: South Wales Scorpions
- Colours: Pink and black
- Founded: 2009; 17 years ago
- Exited: 2017; 9 years ago

Former details
- Competition: League 1
- 2017 season: 15th

Records
- Premierships: 0
- Runners-up: 0
- Minor premierships: 0
- Wooden spoons: 2 (2014, 2015)
- Most capped: 111 – Ashley Bateman
- Highest points scorer: 282 – Paul Emanuelli

The South Wales Scorpions, known as the South Wales Ironmen in 2017, were a semi-professional rugby league club based in South Wales. They played in the third tier of the British rugby league system between 2010 and 2017 (known during this period as either the Championship 1 or League 1). The team initially played at The Gnoll in Neath, before spells at Caerphilly, Mountain Ash, Maesteg, and Merthyr Tydfil.

Under new ownership, the club relocated to Llanelli effective immediately in July 2017. The following season, they began competing as West Wales Raiders.

== History ==
In December 2009, South Wales RLFC was admitted into Championship One for the 2010 season. This followed the relocation of Super League club Crusaders RL from Bridgend to Wrexham. The Scorpions moniker was announced on 22 December.

In 2012, a feeder club for the Scorpions, South Wales Hornets, competed in the National Conference League. The team was disbanded after one season.

Wales Rugby League agreed to take over the running of the Scorpions for the 2014 season after club owner Phil Davies decided to step down.

In 2014, the Scorpions played at Llynfi Road in Maesteg. The club relocated the following year, to Parc Dyffryn Pennar in Mountain Ash, which also served as a training ground. In 2016, the team played at Virginia Park in Caerphilly.

The club was renamed South Wales Ironmen for the 2017 season, coinciding with their move to The Wern, Merthyr Tydfil.

In July 2017, the club was bought by Andrew Thorne, owner of amateur club West Wales Raiders. The Ironmen began using Llanelli's Stebonheath Park as their home ground for the remainder of the season after which the South Wales name was discontinued with the West Wales Raiders replacing them in League 1 in 2018.

== Seasons ==
Season	League										Challenge Cup	Other competitions		Refs
Season	Division	P	W	D	L	F	A	Pts	Pos	Play-offs	Challenge Cup	Other competitions		Refs
2010	Championship 1	20	9	0	11	576	468	34	6th	Lost in Elimination play-offs	—N/a	—N/a		
2011	Championship 1	20	6	0	14	536	674	22	8th	Did not qualify	R3	—N/a		
2012	Championship 1	18	4	0	14	365	680	16	9th	Did not qualify	R4	Championship Cup	GS	
2013	Championship 1	16	5	0	11	368	504	19	8th	Did not qualify	R3	Championship Cup	GS	
2014	Championship 1	20	2	0	18	304	828	10	9th	Did not qualify	R3	—N/a		
2015	Championship 1	22	1	0	21	274	1122	2	14th	Did not qualify	R3	League 1 Cup	R1	
2016	League 1	14	1	0	13	176	582	2	13th	Did not qualify	R3	League 1 Cup	R1	
2017	League 1	15	1	0	14	212	654	2	15th	Did not qualify	R3	League 1 Cup	R1	

== See also ==
- Rugby Football League expansion
