= Llynfi Road =

Welsh sports venue

- Old Parish Ground
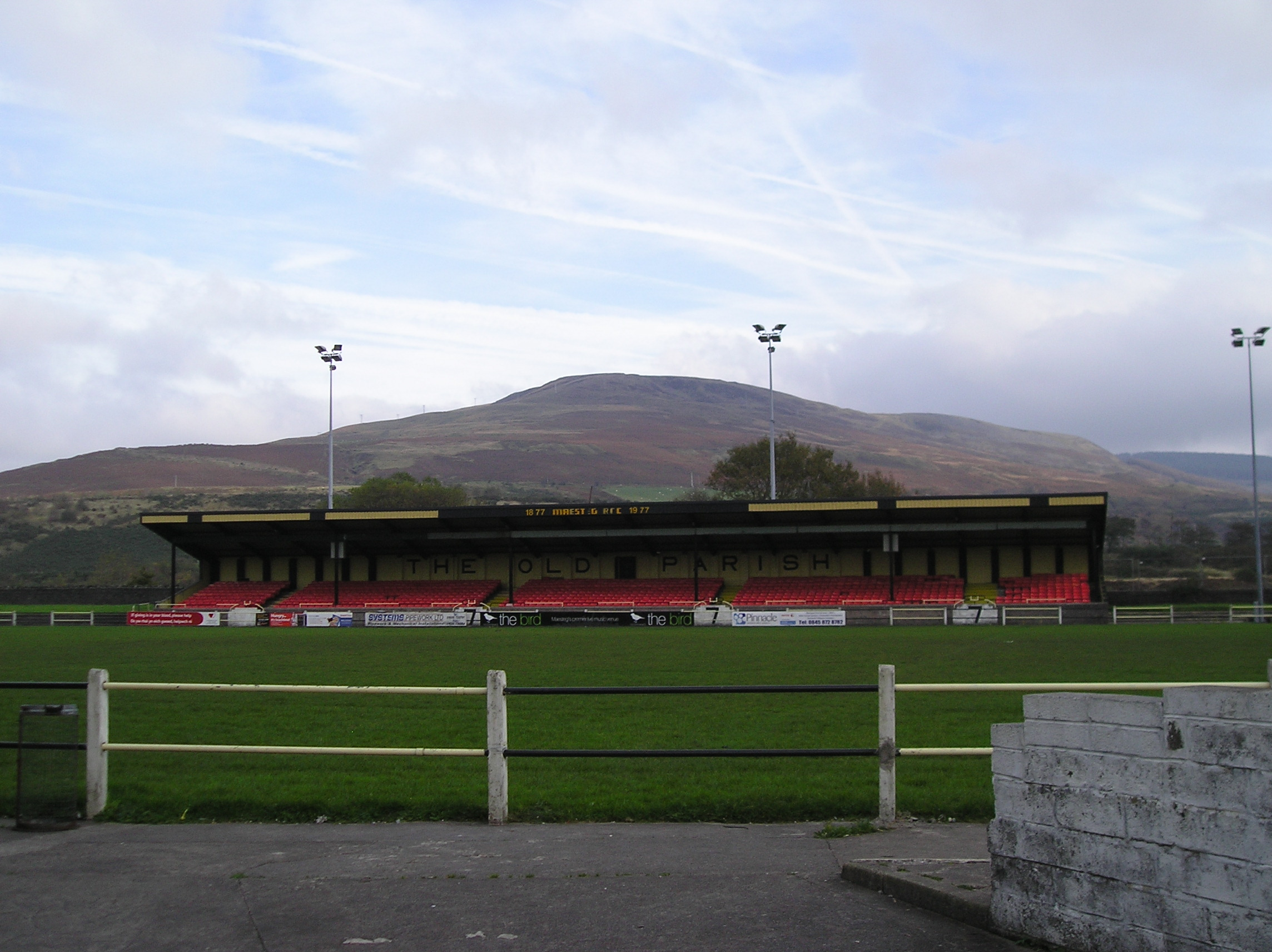
- Interactive map of Llynfi Road
- Location: Maesteg, Bridgend County Borough, Wales
- Coordinates: 51.611401°N 3.661851°W

Tenants
- Maesteg RFC, South Wales Scorpions (2014–2015)

Llynfi Road is a rugby stadium in Maesteg in Bridgend County Borough, Wales. It is the home of Maesteg RFC.

== History ==
=== Rugby Union ===
Maesteg RFC was formed in 1877 in the Llynfi Valley, in the county of Glamorgan. The Llynfi ground (sometimes referred to as the Old Parish, was constructed in an area dominated by Llynfi ironworks at the time and is believed to have been built sometime around the end of the 19th century.

In 1920, a fund was set up to improve the ground and add changing rooms next to the grandstand and add fencing and turnstiles.

=== Greyhound racing ===
A short lived greyhound track was built around the Old Parish Ground owned by Maesteg Rugby Club. The racing took place before World War II from approximately 1930 until the outbreak of war. The Maesteg Greyhound Association applied for a betting licence in 1935, under the Betting and Lotteries Act 1934.

=== Rugby league ===
The first senior rugby league match played at Llynfi Road was in 2005 when Bridgend Blue Bulls played Valley Cougars. The game attracted a crowd of around 1,500. The two sides would face each other again in 2010.

Celtic Crusaders took on Keighley Cougars in 2006, winning 58–18. The game had been moved from Brewery Field because of a Bryan Adams concert two days before. Throughout 2009, Celtic Crusaders reserves played 12 games, their under-18s played four times and the under-16s once.

On 8 November 2009, Italy beat Serbia 42–14 and Lebanon beat Ireland 40–16 in a European Cup ranking double header event.

Professional rugby league returned to the Bridgend county borough as South Wales Scorpions moved to Llynfi Road for the 2014 season. This lasted for one season following the Scorpions move to Mountain Ash for the start of the 2015 season.

=== Club house fire ===
On 13 August 2013, the club's house was devastated by fire, destroying the Sponsor's Lounge including memorabilia and the electricity. Other areas of the club were also damaged by smoke and water. This was a result of an arson attack. This resulted in there being no annual firework display by Maesteg Round Table on 5 November 2013.
