= Dylan Skee =

Australian rugby league footballer

Personal information
- Born: 13 January 1986 (age 40) Australia
- Height: 5 ft 3 in (1.60 m)

Playing information
- Position: Stand-off, Scrum-half
Club
Years	Team	Pld	T	G	FG	P
2008–09	Harlequins RL	3	0	0	0	0
2010	Whitehaven	15	5	14	0	48
2011–13	London Skolars	71	29	232	1	581
	Total	89	34	246	1	629
- Source: As of 28 July 2015

Dylan Skee is an Australian rugby league footballer. He plays as a stand-off or scrum-half. He previously played for Harlequins, Whitehaven, and the London Skolars in the Co-operative Championship One.
