= Oxford Rugby League =

Defunct English rugby league club

Club information
- Full name: Oxford Rugby League
- Short name: Oxford
- Colours: Blue and white
- Founded: 2012; 14 years ago
- Exited: 2017; 9 years ago

Former details
- Ground: Iffley Road (2013–2015), Tilsley Park (2016–17)

Oxford Rugby League was a semi-professional rugby league club based in Oxford, England. The club was formed in 2012 and joined League 1 in 2013, playing for five seasons before agreeing to merge with Gloucestershire All Golds following the 2017 season, resulting in both clubs exiting the league in order to form a new club, Bristol Rugby League, which intended to enter League 1 from the 2019 season. However, when this did not happen, All Golds continued on its own in the southern league, leaving Oxford to simply fold.

== History ==
=== 1976–1993: Early clubs ===
Oxford University has had a rugby league side since 1976 and has been competing in the annual Rugby League Varsity Match against Cambridge since 1981.

Grassroots rugby league began with the Oxford Sharks, formed in association with the Oxford University team. The Sharks dissolved in 1993, but the amateur Oxford Cavaliers were formed three years later.

=== 2012–2017: League 1 ===
Oxford Rugby League was founded in 2012 and was admitted to the semi-professional League 1 in March 2013 along with Hemel Stags and Gloucestershire All Golds as part of the league's expansion, finishing their first season in 6th position and thus qualifying for the play-offs however they were eliminated in their first match against Hemel Stags.

Following a relatively successful first season, the club struggled to make progress on and off the field. In 2016 the club relocated from their initial base at Iffley Road to Tilsley Park in Abingdon. Following the culmination of the 2017 season, it was announced that Oxford would merge with Gloucestershire All Golds, with both clubs exiting the league in order to pool their resources and create a new club based in Bristol. This ultimately didn't happen, and Oxford RL folded.

=== Seasons summary ===
Season	League										Challenge Cup
Season	Division	P	W	D	L	F	A	Pts	Pos	Play-offs	Challenge Cup
2013	Championship 1	16	5	2	9	326	436	23	6th	Lost in Elimination Playoffs	R3
2014	Championship 1	20	7	1	12	493	679	24	8th	Did not qualify	R3
2015	Championship 1	22	7	0	15	453	948	14	10th	Did not qualify	R4
2016	League 1	14	1	0	13	176	582	2	14th	Fifth in Shield	R3
2017	League 1	15	4	0	11	275	629	8	13th	Fifth in Shield	R4

== See also ==
- Rugby Football League expansion
