= Hemel Stags =

Defunct English rugby league club

Club information
- Full name: Hemel Stags Rugby League Club
- Nickname: Stags
- Colours: Blue and yellow
- Founded: 1981; 45 years ago
- Website: hemelstags.com

Current details
- Ground: Pennine Way Stadium (2,000)

Uniforms
Home colours	Away colours

Records
- National Conference League Division 3: 1 (2012)
- London League: 3 (1988–89, 1989–90, 1990–91)
- Southern Cup: 1 (1995)
- Rugby League Alliance First Division: 1 (1998)
- RLC Eastern Division: 1 (2000)

The Hemel Stags are an amateur rugby league club based in Hemel Hempstead, Hertfordshire. They were semi-professional and played in Betfred League 1 from 2013 until 2018. They withdrew from the professional system when their licence was purchased by Eric Perez and permission was granted by the RFL to relocate it, this would ultimately lead to Cornwall R.L.F.C. entering League 1. The extensive community rugby league teams at Hemel Stags were unaffected As such, Hemel Stags still ran an amateur team at the Southern Conference League East Division in the 2021 season.

== History ==
=== 1981–1990: Foundations ===
Hemel Hempstead Amateur Rugby League Football Club played its first match on 5 April 1981 against the Walthamstow-based McEntee, losing 38–0. It began as a pub team wearing borrowed jerseys. After a series of friendly fixtures during summer 1981, the club was formally constituted and joined the Second Division of the South Amateur Rugby League. The club's original logo featured Henry VIII as the local association football team Hemel F.C. is nicknamed "The Tudors".

During the club's early seasons, success on the field was hard to come by. Nevertheless, the club was determined to prosper and in its fourth season it opened its first social club at Pennine Way in February 1985 – a modest self-build affair. Commercial pressures led to the club leaving the London League division two and joining the Midlands and South West Amateur Rugby League Association (MASWARLA) for the 1986–87 and 1987–88 seasons. This brought playing success and on the club's return to the London Amateur Rugby League it became the dominant force in amateur rugby league in the South of England.

=== 1991–2011: Competitiveness and success ===
Hemel were London League champions in 1989–90 and 1990–91 and from there joined the Rugby League Alliance in 1991; the club played the reserve teams of professional clubs. At the same time, the club appointed Chris Tate as its first full-time development officer with the task of developing junior and youth players in Hemel. The first Stag logo appeared at this time.

The club spent three seasons in the National Conference League Premier Division between 1993 and 1996. David Ellis coached at the club during the 1993–94 and the 1994–95 seasons. A move to the National Conference League saw the club narrowly miss promotion to the professional ranks in 1993. In 1994, Hemel played London Broncos in the Regal Trophy, leading 18–6 at half-time only to succumb in the final 10 minutes. The club's playing depth that day was emphasised when, in the curtain-raiser, its reserves won the Southern Counties Cup against the all-Kiwi South London Warriors.

Hemel were the last winners of the Southern Cup in 1996, beating London Colonials at Roslyn Park RFC. The club was relegated from the NCL Premier division in 1995–96 finishing bottom, having played 22 won 4 and lost 18. After relegation Hemel resigned, spent a year in the London League then returned to the Rugby League Alliance in 1997. Hemel won the First Division of the Alliance in 1998 under player-coach Jay Turner and would have won promotion to the Super League Alliance but for their lack of a suitable stadium; their plan to build a stadium with National Lottery money having fallen through. The name, Hemel Stags, emerged in the late 90s in place of the cumbersome Hemel Hempstead Amateur Rugby League Football Club.

With the Rugby League Alliance being scrapped and its application for the Northern Ford Premiership rejected again because of their lack of a stadium, Hemel joined the newly formed Rugby League Conference for the 1999 season. After several years in the Rugby League Conference, they entered the newly formed National League 3 in 2003. Although the club lost all of its games in the first season, it progressed steadily and made the 2006 Grand Final under new coach Troy Perkins, losing to Bramley Buffaloes.

In 2006, the club entered the Northern Rail Cup, where the team met local rivals St Albans Centurions as well as the semi-professional clubs London Skolars and Crusaders. Hemel finished in second place in the 2006 league table and qualified for the playoffs for the Grand Final, where they lost to Bramley Buffaloes by 30 points to 8.

The arrival of Callum Irving as community rugby league coach in 2006 revitalised junior rugby league in Hemel and subsequently led to the club joining the Gillette National Youth League in 2008. In September 2008, the club obtained planning permission for a small stadium at Pennine Way and in 2010 the first stage was completed with the enclosure of the ground and the opening of an all-weather training pitch and the floodlighting of the main pitch.

=== 2012–2017: Switch to professional rugby ===
In February 2012, Hemel was announced as the second side to join an expanded Championship 1 division for the 2013 season. Hemel Stags beat Huddersfield Underbank Rangers 17–10 in the National Conference League Division 3 Grand Final on 29 September 2012.

In the first campaign as a professional team, Hemel Stags finished fifth in the Kingstone Press Championship 1 claiming a play-off place. After defeating Oxford RLFC 30-26 at the Pennine Way Stadium in the first round, Hemel left the competition following a 28-44 loss away to London Skolars.

The 2014 season saw Hemel Stags finish the regular season of the Kingstone Press Championship 1 in the playoffs places for the second time in their first two seasons of being a semi-professional [rugby league] club. They finished in fifth position with 33 points after drawing 22-22 against Oxford at Iffley Road.

The club has played in a number of leagues over the years, from the London League, MASWARLA, National Conference League and the Alliance League. The dilemma for the club was how to raise standards without the costs of constant trips to the stronger leagues in the North of England.

The club has an active development policy in the town and a number of schools and junior sides are supported by the development officer.

Rugby league has a long history in Hemel schools with some of them having played it for 20 years. The schools' work has produced a number of talented rugby league players, including Dan Sarginson who now plays for the Super League club, Wigan and Kieran Dixon for Hull Kingston Rovers. Jack Howieson and Simon Tillyer played professionally for the Championship club, Sheffield Eagles.

As of the 2017 season, Hemel Stags moved their training base to Dewsbury, West Yorkshire, which ultimately signalled an end to their first foray into professionalism.

=== 2018–2020: Withdrawal from League 1 ===
In October 2018 the club announced that they were withdrawing from league one for 2019 with a view to possibly returning in 2020 and for 2019 the club had applied to join the Southern Conference competition to be launched in the spring of 2019.

On 20 May 2019, the semi-pro franchise of the club was granted approval to relocate to Ottawa, Ontario, Canada, where it was intended will play at TD Place Stadium beginning in 2021. However, the relocated licence was ultimately used by Eric Perez to admit Cornwall R.L.F.C. to League One. Hemel Stags remain active in amateur rugby league.

== Seasons ==
Season	League										Challenge Cup
Season	Division	P	W	D	L	F	A	Pts	Pos	Play-offs	Challenge Cup
1981–1986: Played in London League
1986–1988: Played in Midlands and South West League
1988–1991: Played in London League
1991–1993: Played in Rugby League Alliance League
1993–1997: Played in Rugby League Conference National Division
1997–1998: Played in London League
1999–2012: Played in Rugby League Conference National Division		'99 / '00 / '01 / '02 / '03 / '04 / '05; Regional Leagues / / / / 10th / 6th / 6th; '06 / '07 / '08 / '09 / '10 / '11 / '12; 2nd / 6th / 8th / 5th / 3rd / 4th / 2nd								Runner-up (2006); Winners (2012)	Did not participate
2013	Championship 1	16	8	0	8	381	365	28	5th	Lost in Semi Final	R4
2014	Championship 1	20	8	2	10	482	521	33	5th	Lost in Elimination Playoffs	R4
2015	Championship 1	22	5	0	17	422	903	8	13th	Did not qualify	R3
2016	League 1	14	1	0	13	190	718	2	15th	Seventh in Shield	R3
2017	League 1	15	1	0	14	229	792	2	16th	Seventh in Shield	R3
2018–2020: Reformed as Ottawa Aces then became Cornwall R.L.F.C.
2021	Conference League South	11	1	0	10	139	423	1	7th	Did not qualify	Did not participate
2022	Did Not Participate									Did not qualify	Did not participate
2023	East Rugby League	8	5	0	3	154	156	10	2nd	Did not qualify	Did not participate
2024	East Rugby League	8	6	0	2	250	180	12	1st	Did not qualify	Did not participate

== Club honours ==
- London League: 1988–89, 1989–90, 1990–91
- Southern Cup: 1995
- Rugby League Alliance First Division: 1998
- RLC Eastern Division: 2000
- RLC South Central Division: 2001, 2002
- London Junior League: 2006, 2008
- NCL Division 3: 2012

== See also ==
- Rugby Football League expansion
