= London Skolars =

English rugby league club

Club information
- Full name: London Skolars Rugby League Football Club
- Nickname: Skolars
- Colours: Red and black
- Founded: 1995; 31 years ago (as Student Rugby League Old Boys)
- Website: skolarsrl.com

Current details
- Grounds: 1995– New River Stadium (5,000); May – August 2014 Queen Elizabeth II Stadium (2,500)
- CEO: Colin Browne
- Chairman: Adrian Fraine
- Coach: Trevor McLachlan
- Manager: Charlie DeHaan
- Captain: Louis Robinson
- Competition: Southern Conference League
- 2023 season: 10th (League 1)

Uniforms
Home colours

Records
- London League: 3 (2000, 2001, 2004)
- RLC Challenge Cup: 1 (2004)
- RLC Southern Division: 1 (2000)
- RLC London & South Division: 1 (2002)
- Middlesex 9s: 1 (2003)

The London Skolars are a rugby league club based at the New River Stadium in Wood Green, Haringey, North London. Founded in 1995, the club operated as a semi-professional team for 2003 and competed in the League 1 until it withdrew from the professional leagues at the end of 2023. The London Skolars were accepted into the Southern Conference League (SCL) for the 2024 season.

== History ==
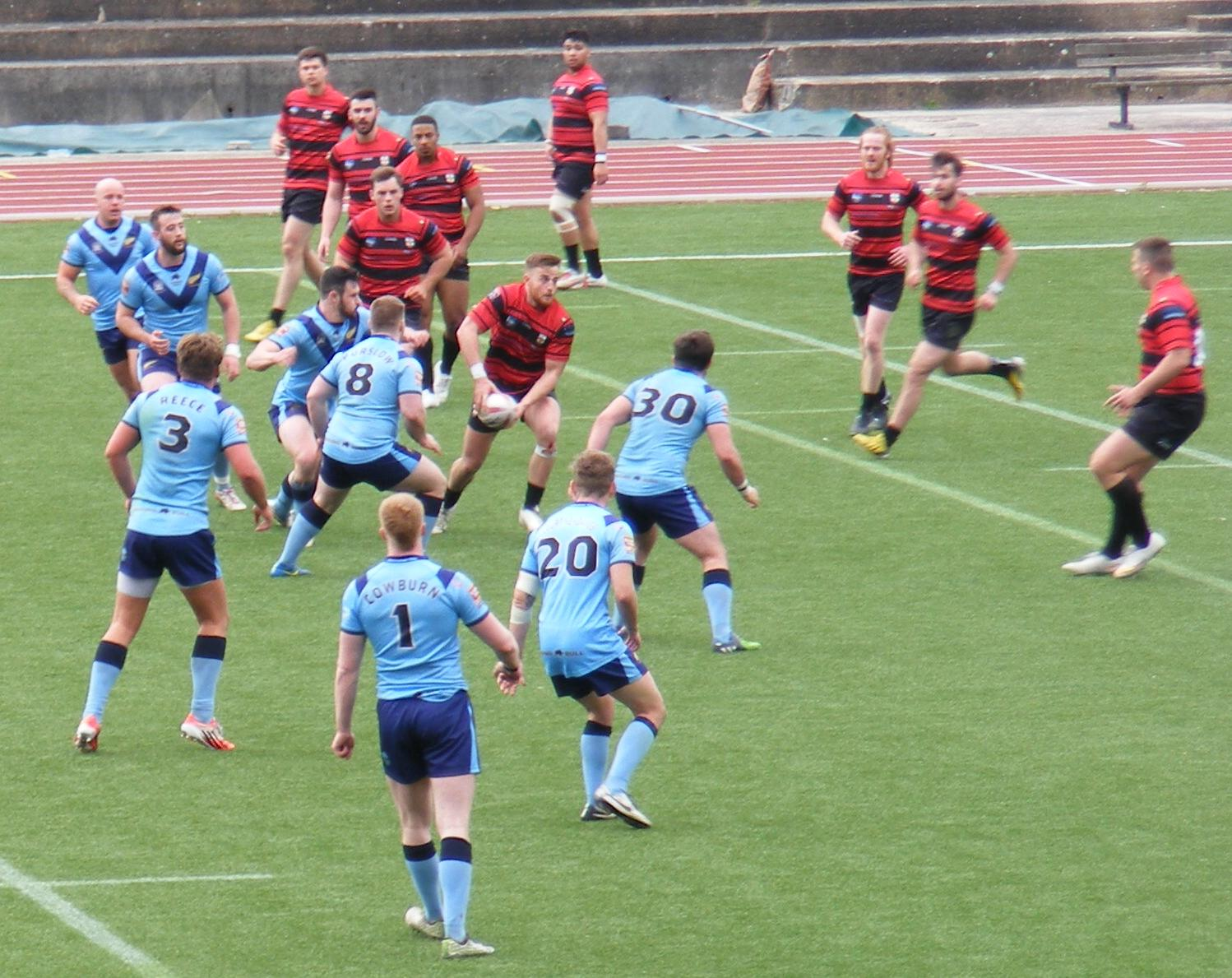
Skolars (red) play Gloucestershire All Golds (blue) in the 2015 Championship 1

The London Skolars were founded in 1995 by Ian "Hector" McNeil as the Student Rugby League Old Boys. The club was established for post-university graduates in London who wished to continue playing competitive rugby league, with several former international student players among its members. Initially, the team played at Hackney RFC and quickly expanded its player base to include London-based antipodeans and local rugby enthusiasts.

In 1997, the club changed its name to London Skolars, partly to humorously reference its academic origins but primarily due to a potential sponsorship from Skol Lager. The Skolars became a founding member of the Southern Conference League (SCL), the precursor to the Rugby League Conference, and won the inaugural competition (under the name North London Skolars). They also relocated to New River Stadium. Later that year, the Skolars joined the National Conference League, becoming the only club south of Sheffield in the competition for four consecutive seasons.

In 1998, the Skolars hosted Strella XIII, marking the first time a team from Tatarstan had toured Great Britain. During the 1999 season, the Skolars toured Russia, becoming the first amateur club to tour the former Soviet Union.

In 2000, the Skolars' first team won the Southern Division of the Rugby League Conference, while the second team secured the London League title. The second team repeated this achievement in 2001.

The club applied to join the National Leagues in 2002 and was accepted, becoming the first club in eighty years to transition from amateur to professional leagues. The A team also joined the Conference and won the London & South Division in its first year.

In 2003, during their inaugural season in National League Two, the Skolars finished at the bottom of the league but made significant progress in 2004, winning the Middlesex 9s and the London League. They dropped "North" from their name to become London Skolars. The appointment of Latham Tawhai as a full-time coach at the end of the 2005 season marked another step forward for the club.

Tawhai left the Skolars at the end of 2007 to become assistant coach at Harlequins RL, and was succeeded by Tony Benson. Benson left at the end of the 2008 season due to the logistical challenges of traveling from his home in Leigh, Greater Manchester. Callum Irving, Benson's assistant, took over as head coach but resigned in July 2009 for personal reasons. Injured player Jermaine Coleman then served as interim head coach for the remainder of the season. In 2009, the club appointed its first full-time CEO, Philip Browne, who was later replaced by Howard Kramer in 2010. The Skolars finished the 2009 season in 10th place in the Championship One table, taking the wooden spoon with just one win and five points. James Massara, a Hammersmith-born 32-year-old, was named head coach in 2010, followed by the appointment of former Harlequins RL player Joe Mbu in October 2010.

Under Mbu, the Skolars finished 4th in the Championship 1 in 2013, reaching the play-offs but failing to achieve promotion after being knocked out in the semi-finals. In 2014, the Skolars finished 7th out of 9 teams. Following a heavy defeat by Swinton Lions in the Challenge Cup early in the 2015 season, Mbu was released from his contract on 9 March.

On 18 March 2015, the Skolars appointed ex-player and then Hemel Stags assistant coach Jermaine Coleman as head coach. In his first season, Coleman led the Skolars to 11th place out of 14 teams. He strengthened the squad and guided the Skolars to a top-8 playoff position, securing a dramatic 23-22 win over the Gloucestershire All Golds.

In 2021, Mbu returned as coach. However, the team struggled in the league, finishing 9th out of 11 in both the 2021 and 2022 seasons. The 2023 season was particularly challenging, the club announced it would withdraw from the professional structure and continue as a community club in the Southern Conference League. On 29 July, they withdrew from the Southern Conference League, being unable to field for a number of matches.

On 12 September 2024, it was reported that Australian Trevor McLachlan had been appointed as head coach.

== Past coaches ==
- Latham Tawhai (2005–2007)
- Tony Benson (2007–2008)
- Jermaine Coleman (2009)
- James Massara (2010)
- Joe Mbu (2010–2015)
- Jermaine Coleman (2015–2021)
- Joe Mbu (2021–2023)
- Trevor McLachlan (2024–present)

== Seasons ==
Season	League										Challenge Cup	Other competitions	
Season	Division	P	W	D	L	F	A	Pts	Pos	Play-offs	Challenge Cup	Other competitions	
2003	National League Two	18	1	1	16	222	876	3	10th	Did not qualify	R3		
2004	National League Two	18	6	0	12	361	583	12	8th	Did not qualify	R4	Middlesex 9s	W
2005	National League Two	18	2	0	16	258	620	4	10th	Did not qualify	R3		
2006	National League Two	22	5	1	16	406	776	11	9th	Did not qualify	R4		
2007	National League Two	22	8	1	13	448	610	30	9th	Did not qualify	R4		
2008	National League Two	22	4	1	17	449	823	20	11th	Did not qualify	R4		
2009	Championship 1	18	1	0	17	210	927	5	10th	Did not qualify	R3		
2010	Championship 1	20	2	0	18	444	900	10	10th	Did not qualify	R3		
2011	Championship 1	20	5	1	14	433	678	21	9th	Did not qualify	R4		
2012	Championship 1	18	7	1	10	558	560	26	7th	Did not qualify	R3		
2013	Championship 1	16	10	0	6	489	468	32	4th	Lost in preliminary final	R3		
2014	Championship 1	20	5	0	15	471	647	24	7th	Did not qualify	R4		
2015	Championship 1	22	5	0	17	388	671	10	11th	Did not qualify	R3		
2016	League 1	21	8	0	13	470	650	16	8th	Did not qualify	R3		
2017	League 1	15	6	1	8	367	453	13	11th	Lost in Shield Final	R4		
2018	League 1	26	6	1	19	626	887	13	12th	Did not qualify	R3		
2019	League 1	20	7	1	12	440	542	15	8th	Did not qualify	R3		
2020	League 1	League abandoned due to the COVID-19 pandemic in the United Kingdom									R3		
2021	League 1	18	3	1	14	372	605	7	9th	Did not qualify	Did not participate		
2022	League 1	20	6	0	14	440	827	12	9th	Did not qualify	R3		
2023	League 1	18	0	0	18	254	897	0	10th	Did not qualify	R2		
2024	Southern Conference League	12	0	0	12	74	476	0	9th	Did not qualify	Did not participate		
2025	London & South East League	0	0	0	0	0	0	0		Did not qualify	Did not participate		

== Honours ==
League

- RFL London League:

Winners (3): 2000, 2001, 2004

- Conference South Division:

Winners (2): 2000, 2002

- Conference Eastern Division:

Winners (1): 1997

Cups

- Conference Challenge Cup:

Winners (1): 2004

- Harry Jepson Trophy:

Winners (2): 1997, 2012

Nines

- Middlesex 9s:

Winners (1): 2003

== Player Records ==
Semi-professional era from 2003 to 2023

=== Most appearances ===
Rank	Player	Apps.	Points	Skolars Career
1	(England) Gareth Honor	198	133	2003–2011
2	(England) Austen Aggrey	178	216	2004–2012
3	(Jamaica) Jermaine Coleman	164	116	2004–2011; 2015–2019; 2021
4	(Jamaica) Lamont Bryan	145	192	2010–2012; 2014–2015; 2017–2023
5=	(England) Dave Williams	144	104	2010–2017
5=	(England) Michael Sykes	144	32	2010–2019; 2021
7	(England) John Paxton	128	124	2009–2017
8	(England) Neil Thorman	119	518	2010–2012; 2018–2022
9	(Jamaica) Corey Simms	112	108	2005–2009
10	(England) Aaron Small	109	128	2010–2012; 2015–2017; 2021–2023

=== Most tries ===
Rank	Player	Tries	Apps.	Skolars Career
1	(England) Austen Aggrey	54	178	2004–2012
2	(England) Ade Adebisi	52	68	2006; 2010–2013
3	(Jamaica) Lamont Bryan	48	145	2010–2012; 2014–2015; 2017–2023
4	(England) James Anthony	47	85	2011–2013; 2015
5	(England) Lameck Juma	42	97	2012; 2016–2023
6	(England) Gareth Honor	33	198	2003–2011
7=	(Wales) Matt Thomas	32	83	2008–2012
7=	(England) Aaron Small	32	109	2010–2012; 2015–2017; 2021–2023
9	(England) John Paxton	31	128	2009–2017
10	(Australia) Dylan Skee	30	72	2011–2013

=== Most goals ===
Rank	Player	Goals	D-Gls.	Apps.	Skolars Career
1	(Australia) Dylan Skee	229	1	72	2011–2013
2	(England) Neil Thorman	226	2	119	2010–2012; 2018–2022
3	(England) Paul Thorman	221	2	106	2007–2010
4	(Jamaica) Jy-mel Coleman	97	3	88	2009–2011; 2016–2019; 2021
5	(England) Mike Bishay	70	1	105	2013–2021
6	(England) Phil Lyon	67	0	47	2017–2018; 2022–2023
7	(England) Tim Gee	50	0	24	2005–2006
8	(England) Charlie Lawrence	46	2	50	2016–2018
9	(England) Jake Johnstone	45	0	24	2003
10	(England) Ben Joyce	36	2	69	2004–2006; 2009

=== Most points ===
Rank	Player	Points	Apps.	Skolars Career
1	(Australia) Dylan Skee	579	72	2011–2013
2	(England) Neil Thorman	518	119	2010–2012; 2018–2022
3	(England) Paul Thorman	488	106	2007–2010
4	(Jamaica) Jy-mel Coleman	285	88	2009–2011; 2016–2019; 2021
5	(England) Mike Bishay	253	105	2013–2021
6	(England) Austen Aggrey	216	178	2004–2012
7	(England) Ade Adebisi	208	68	2006; 2010–2013
8	(Jamaica) Lamont Bryan	192	145	2010–2012; 2014–2015; 2017–2023
9	(England) James Anthony	188	85	2011–2013; 2015
10	(England) Lameck Juma	168	97	2012; 2016–2023

== See also ==
- Rugby Football League expansion
