= RFL Championship =

British rugby league

Championship
- Current season, competition or edition: 2026 RFL Championship
- Sport: Rugby league
- Founded: 2003; 23 years ago (as National League 1); 2009; 17 years ago as (Championship)
- No. of teams: 20
- Country: England; Wales
- Most recent champions: London Broncos (2nd title)
- Most titles: Leigh Leopards (5 titles)
- Level on pyramid: 2
- Domestic cups: Challenge Cup; 1895 Cup
- Website: Championship

The Rugby Football League Championship, is the second highest tier of rugby league in Britain .

Introduced in 2003 as National League One, it replaced the existing Second Division. It was rebranded as the Championship in 2009.

Until the end of the 2025 season the league consisted of 13 or 14 teams, with the winner decided by a playoff. Prior to the 2026 season, the Championship and the third division, League One, were merged into a single second tier below Super League.

London Broncos were winners of the 2026 season after beating Doncaster in the Championship Grand Final.

== History ==
=== 1902–1973: Establishment and regular competition ===
Second division rugby league competitions have been played at various times since 1902, and have been in place annually since 1973. When Super League began in 1996, the second division continued to operate a system of promotion and relegation with the new competition. In 1999, the second-tier competition below the Super League was renamed the Northern Ford Premiership (NFP) when Northern Ford Dealers acquired the naming rights.

=== 2002–2008: National Leagues ===
In 2003, the NFP was re-organised into National Leagues One and Two. Teams that finished in the top ten league positions of the 2002 Northern Ford Premiership joined National League One and the bottom eight joined National League Two. They were joined by London Skolars from the Rugby League Conference, who entered National League Two, and York City Knights, who replaced the defunct York Wasps (who had folded mid-season in 2002) and also joined National League Two in 2003, creating two ten-team leagues which operated a system of promotion and relegation between themselves while also maintaining the promotion and relegation between National League One and Super League.

At the same time, National League Three was created with teams from the Rugby League Conference and from the British Amateur Rugby League Association amateur leagues. It was intended that there would be promotion and relegation between National League Two and National League Three when League Three became more established, however this never eventuated.

=== 2009–2014: Championship ===
In 2009 Super League was expanded to 14 teams, with two additional teams being promoted from National League One. In turn, two additional teams were promoted from National League Two to National League One at the end of the 2008 season, reducing the number of teams in National League Two to 10. National Leagues One and Two were then rebranded as the Championship and Championship 1 respectively, with the change being implemented in time for the 2009 season. Championship 1 was later rebranded to League 1. During this period, a system of licensing was put in place which meant there was no automatic system of promotion and relegation between the Championship and Super League, although promotion and relegation continued between the Championship and League 1. Widnes Vikings were promoted to Super League from the Championship via the licensing system in 2011.

The record crowd for a club game at this level of competition was set in 2017 at KCOM Craven Park for the opening fixture of the season between Hull Kingston Rovers and Bradford Bulls with Rovers winning 54–24 in front of a crowd of 8,817. The crowd record for regular season attendance was also broken in 2008 with an average of 2,205 spectators at each game.

=== 2015–2018: Super 8s ===
In 2013, Super League clubs agreed to reduce the number of clubs in the competition to 12 and return to an amended system of promotion and relegation with a 12-club Championship competition. These changes came into effect for the 2015 season.

Under the amended structure, the 12 Super League and 12 Championship clubs play a regular season of 23 rounds, including a Magic Weekend for both divisions. Following the conclusion of their regular league seasons, the 24 clubs then compete in a play-off series where they split into 3 divisions of 8 based upon league position:

- The bottom 4 Super League clubs and the top 4 Championship clubs compete in The Qualifiers. They play each other once (either home or away) to determine which four of the clubs will compete in Super League the following year.
- The remaining (bottom 8) Championship clubs compete for the Championship Shield and to avoid relegation to League 1. Two clubs will be relegated each year.

=== 2019–2023: Return of playoffs ===
On 14 September 2018, an EGM was called to discuss the future of the sport and a change in structure, as the clubs were in favour of scrapping the Super 8s in favour of a more conventional structure. Two proposals were put forward: one by Super League and one by the Championship and League 1;

Super League proposal: The Super League proposed staying with 12 teams who play each other home and away plus Magic Weekend and 6 loop fixtures (29 games). They also proposed a return to a top-5 playoff and the 12th placed team being relegated.

Championship & League 1 proposal: The alternative proposal was that Super League would expand to 14 clubs playing 29 games ending with a top-5 playoff. The team finishing 14th would be relegated and 13th would play 2nd, 3rd and 4th in the Championship in a relegation playoff.

After a vote, the Super League proposal was voted through was implemented for the 2019 season. The Championship clubs then voted for a top 5 playoff being used to decide which team will be promoted to Super League.

=== 2024–2025: Introduction of grading ===
From 2024 there was no automatic promotion from the Championship to Super League. Membership of Super League was determined entirely by IMG grading.

The grading system made no effect on the make-up of Super League for 2025 as the Championship winners, Wakefield Trinity, were placed 8th in the grading list - so would have been promoted under the previous system. The 2025 season saw Bradford Bulls and two other highest rated IMG clubs promoted to the Betfred Super League York Knights and Toulouse Olympique. Salford Red Devils were relegated to the Championship.

=== 2026: merger with League One ===
At the end of 2025 the Championship was merged with League One into a 21 team division. In early January 2026 Featherstone Rovers were ejected from the Rugby Football League due to the club being in an extended period of administration reducing the number of clubs in the league to 20. By the start of the season at the end of January, there was no decision on whether there would be any automatic promotion and relegation between Super League and the Championship or whether entry to Super league is entirely on IMG grading. The 2026 Championship features a play-off system between the top ten clubs, details of which were released on 16 January.

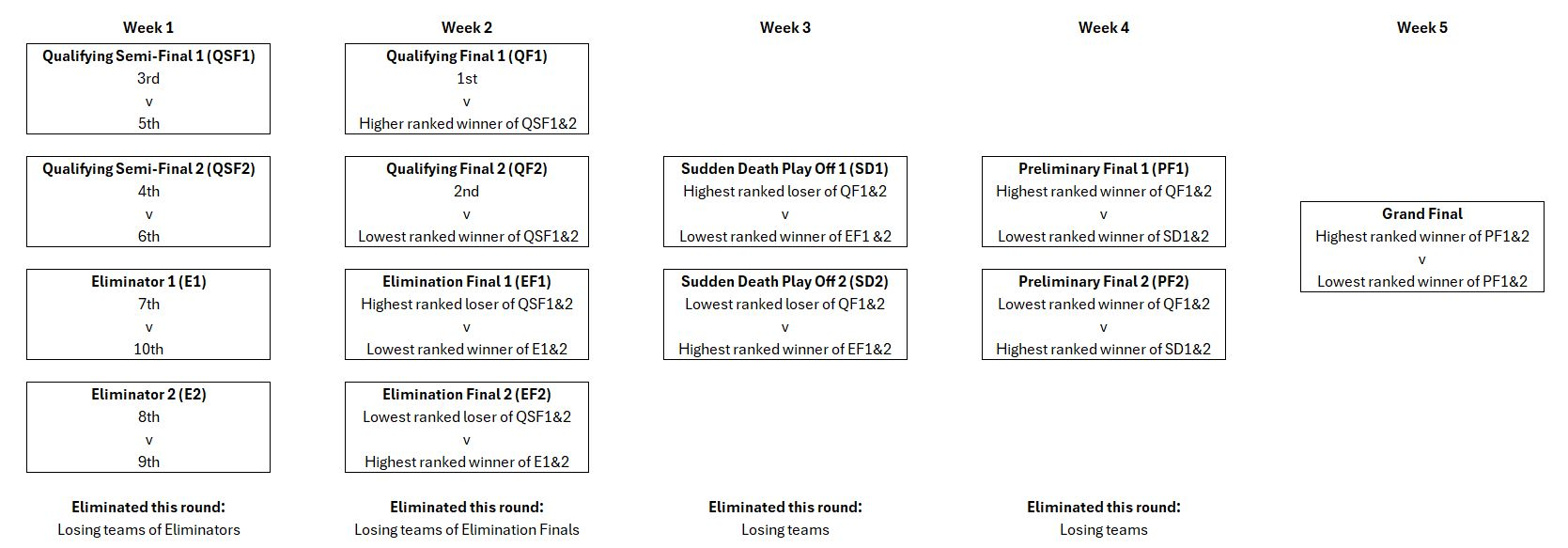
Play-off structure for 2026

== Clubs ==
Championship clubs
Colours	Club	Established	Location	Stadium	Capacity*
	Barrow Raiders	1875	Barrow-in-Furness, Cumbria	Craven Park	6,000
	Batley Bulldogs	1880	Batley, West Yorkshire	Mount Pleasant	7,500
	Birmingham Hurricanes	1998	Birmingham, West Midlands	Avery Fields	1,500
	Dewsbury Rams	1898	Dewsbury, West Yorkshire	Crown Flatt	5,100
	Doncaster	1951	Doncaster, South Yorkshire	Eco-Power Stadium	15,231
	Goole Vikings	2018	Goole, East Yorkshire	Victoria Pleasure Grounds	3,000
	Halifax Panthers	1873	Halifax, West Yorkshire	The Shay	14,000
	Hunslet	1973	Leeds, West Yorkshire	South Leeds Stadium	4,000
	Keighley Cougars	1876	Keighley, West Yorkshire	Cougar Park	7,800
	London Broncos	1980	Wimbledon, London	Plough Lane	9,215
	Newcastle Thunder	2000	Swalwell, Tyne and Wear	Crow Trees Ground	2000
	North Wales Crusaders	2011	Colwyn Bay, Conwy	Eirias Stadium	5,500
	Oldham	1876	Oldham, Greater Manchester	Boundary Park (Note: Oldham began the 2026 season at Bower Fold due to a dispute over their use of Boundary Park)	13,513
	Rochdale Hornets	1871	Rochdale, Greater Manchester	Spotland Stadium	10,249
	Salford	1873	Barton-upon-Irwell, Greater Manchester	Salford Community Stadium	11,404
	Sheffield Eagles	1984	Sheffield, South Yorkshire	Steel City Stadium	3,000
	Swinton Lions	1866	Sale, Greater Manchester	Heywood Road	3,387
	Whitehaven	1948	Whitehaven, Cumbria	Recreation Ground	8,603
	Widnes Vikings	1875	Widnes, Cheshire	Halton Stadium	13,500
	Workington Town	1945	Workington, Cumbria	Derwent Park	10,000

- Seat capacity for other sports, concerts and events may differ.

== Structure ==
=== Regular season ===
As envisaged for the 2026 competition, there are 20 clubs in the Championship. During the course of the season (usually from January to September) each club plays 12 home games, and 12 away games. Each club will play 12 teams in one season, 10 of which will be determined by league position from the previous season, while the remaining two teams will be determined based on local rivalries and geographic proximity.

Teams receive two points for a win, one for a draw and none for a loss.

Teams are ranked by competition points, then points difference (points scored less points conceded), then points scored. The team finishing top at the end of the regular season is awarded the League Leaders Shield.

The 2026 season was affected by the exclusion of Featherstone Rovers after the fixture list had been published. Initially, rather than re-arrange all fixtures, the games that would have involved Featherstone were vacated and those clubs scheduled to play Featherstone would play two games fewer. The Championship table would have been ranked on win percentage. This decision was reversed and replacement fixtures were scheduled for clubs that had been due to play Featherstone. As a result, all clubs will still play 24 matches and competition points will decide the table rather than win percentage.

=== Play-offs ===
The play-offs have had various formats. Currently once every club has played all 24 games, the top ten teams qualify for the playoffs.

The 2026 play-offs will begin on the first weekend of September, and will conclude with the Grand Final, in the first weekend of October.

== Results ==
The champions of the Championship are determined by a playoff series at the end of the regular season. The team at the top of the league table at the end of regular season is awarded the League Leaders’ Shield. This has been the case for all but the four seasons of the Super 8s era where the league leaders were declared Champions and promotion was determined by The Qualifiers.

Year	Champions	Score	Runners up	Relegated
2003	Salford	31–14	Leigh	Dewsbury
2004	Leigh	32–16	Whitehaven	Keighley
2005	Castleford	36–8	Whitehaven	Barrow; Featherstone
2006	Hull Kingston Rovers	29–16	Widnes	Oldham; York
2007	Castleford	42–10	Widnes	Rochdale; Doncaster
2008	Salford	36–18	Crusaders	Dewsbury
2009	Barrow	26–18	Halifax	Doncaster; Gateshead
2010	Halifax	23–22	Featherstone	Keighley; Whitehaven
2011	Featherstone	40–4	Sheffield	Barrow; Toulouse
2012	Sheffield	20–16	Featherstone	None
2013	Sheffield	19–12	Batley	York; Hunslet
2014	Leigh	36–12	Featherstone	Barrow; Swinton; Rochdale, North Wales; Keighley
2015	Leigh	N/A	Bradford	Doncaster; Hunslet
2016	Leigh	N/A	London	Workington; Whitehaven
2017	Hull Kingston Rovers	N/A	London	Oldham; Bradford
2018	Toronto	N/A	London	None
2019	Toronto	24–6	Featherstone	Barrow; Rochdale
2020	Season cancelled due to the COVID-19 pandemic. Leigh elevated to Super League			
2021	Toulouse	34–12	Featherstone	Oldham; Swinton
2022	Leigh	44–12	Batley	Dewsbury; Workington
2023	London	18–14	Toulouse	Keighley; Newcastle
2024	Wakefield	36–0	Toulouse	Swinton; Whitehaven; Dewsbury
2025	Toulouse	10–8	York	None
Year	Champions	Score	Runners up	Bottom
2026	London	78-6	Doncaster	North Wales

=== Winners ===
	Club	Wins	runners up	Winning years
1	Leigh Leopards	5	1	2004, 2014, 2015, 2016, 2022
2	London Broncos	2	3	2023, 2026
3	Toulouse Olympique	2	2	2021, 2025
4	Sheffield Eagles	2	1	2012, 2013
5	Salford Red Devils	2	0	2003, 2008
5	Castleford Tigers	2	0	2005, 2007
5	Hull Kingston Rovers	2	0	2006, 2017
5	Toronto Wolfpack	2	0	2018, 2019
6	Featherstone Rovers	1	5	2011
7	Halifax Panthers	1	1	2010
8	Barrow Raiders	1	0	2009
8	Wakefield Trinity	1	0	2024
9	Whitehaven	0	2	–
9	Widnes Vikings	0	2	–
9	Batley Bulldogs	0	2	–
10	Crusaders	0	1	–
10	Bradford Bulls	0	1	–
10	York Knights	0	1	–

== Sponsor ==
The Championship has been sponsored four times since its inception in 2003. Betfred are the current title sponsor.

The title sponsor has been able to determine the league's sponsorship name. There have been seven different title sponsors since the league's formation:

Period	Sponsor	Name
2003–2008	Nuffield	LHF Healthplan National League 1
2009–2012	Co-operative Group	Co-operative Championship
2013–2017	Kingstone Press Cider	Kingstone Press Championship
2018–2026	Betfred	Betfred Championship

The official rugby ball supplier is Steeden.

== Media ==
Period	Broadcaster
2008–2011	Sky Sports; Premier Sports
2012–2013	Premier Sports
2014	Sky Sports (Grand Final Only)
2015–2021	Sky Sports
2022	Premier Sports
2023	Viaplay Sports
2024–present	none

=== TV ===
Sky Sports and Premier Sports shared the TV rights to the Championship between 2008 and 2012. After Sky only showed the Championship and Championship 1 Grand Finals while games were broadcast on Premier Sports until 2013. There was no TV coverage on the Championship in 2014. In 2015 Sky Sports won the rights to show the Championship including The Summer Bash, Championship Shield and The Qualifiers in a seven-year deal.

A two-year broadcast deal with Premier Sports for 2022 and 2023 was signed at the end of 2021. Premier show a live match every Monday as well as all seven matches from the Summer Bash. The deal also includes the broadcasting rights to play-off matches and the Million Pound Game.

Premier Sports became part of Viaplay late in 2022 and was marketed as Viaplay Sports for the 2023 season.

=== Radio ===
Regional radio stations have coverage of the Championship clubs but mostly only cover Super League clubs in the same area and give updates of Championship scores and results.

== Academies ==
=== Reserve League ===
In 2014 and 2015 Super League clubs were unhappy with the Dual registration system and wanted to form an Under 23 reserve leagues between the Under 19s and 1st team. Wigan, Warrington and St Helens were the first teams to propose the return of the reserve league where players could move from the under 19s and play with professional players before playing in the 1st team. A reserve league was set up in 2016 with a mixture of Super League, Championship and League 1 teams.

=== Dual registration ===
Clubs in both the Super League and the Championships benefit from the new dual registration system which was introduced for the 2013 season. The new system is intended to complement the existing player loan system.

Dual registration refers to an arrangement between clubs whereby a player continues to be registered to his current Super League club and is also registered to play for a club in the Championship.

The dual registration scheme was abandoned in 2025.

== Match officials ==
All rugby league matches are governed by the laws set out by the RFL; these laws are enforced by match officials. Former Super League and International Referee Phil Bentham is the current head of the Match Officials Department.

== See also ==
- British rugby league system
- Super League
- Rugby League Conference
- Northern Ford Premiership
- Championship Cup
- Betfred League 1
- List of professional sports teams in the United Kingdom
