= List of British rugby league stadiums by capacity =

This is a list of British rugby league stadiums. ranked in descending order of capacity. There is a large number of rugby league stadiums and pitches in England, and a definitive list of stadiums would be impossible to produce. This list, therefore, is limited to stadiums that meet one of the following criteria based on current capacity:

- Used by a club in the professional pyramid
- Has a capacity of at least 3,000.
- Teams outside of the UK that compete in the British rugby league system are included but not ranked.

== Existing stadiums ==
Overall Rank	Stadium	Town / City	Capacity	Team	League
1	Odsal Stadium	Bradford	26,019	Bradford Bulls	Super League
2	MKM Stadium	Hull	25,586	Hull F.C.	Super League
3	Brick Community Stadium	Wigan	25,133	Wigan Warriors	Super League
4	Headingley	Headingley, Leeds	21,062	Leeds Rhinos, Leeds Rhinos Women	Super League; Women's Super League
	Stade Ernest-Wallon	(France) Toulouse (Note: Located in France but club plays in a top 2 tier of British Rugby League)	19,500	Toulouse Olympique	Super League
5	BrewDog Stadium	St Helens	18,000	St Helens, St Helens Women	Super League; Women's Super League
6	Eco-Power Stadium	Doncaster	15,231	Doncaster	Championship
7	Halliwell Jones Stadium	Warrington	15,200	Warrington Wolves	Super League
8	Boundary Park	Oldham	13,531	Oldham	Championship
9	Halton Stadium	Widnes	13,500	Widnes Vikings	Championship
	Stade Gilbert Brutus	(France) Perpignan	13,000	Catalans Dragons	Super League
10	Craven Park	Hull	12,225	Hull Kingston Rovers	Super League
11	Salford Community Stadium	Barton upon Irwell, Salford	12,000	Salford	Championship
12	Leigh Sports Village	Leigh	12,000	Leigh Leopards; Leigh Leopards Women	Super League; Women's Super League
13	Wheldon Road	Castleford	11,775	Castleford Tigers	Super League
14	The Shay	Halifax	10,401	Halifax Panthers	Championship
15	Kingston Park	Newcastle upon Tyne	10,200	Newcastle Thunder	Championship
16	Derwent Park	Workington	10,000	Workington Town	Championship
17	Spotland Stadium	Rochdale	9,961	Rochdale Hornets	Championship
18	Post Office Road	Featherstone	9,850	Featherstone Rovers	Championship
19	Belle Vue	Wakefield	9,333	Wakefield Trinity	Championship
20	Plough Lane	Wimbledon, London	9,215	London Broncos	Championship
21	York Community Stadium	Huntington, York	8,500	York Knights, York Valkyrie	Super League; Women's Super League
22	Craven Park	Barrow in Furness	7,600	Barrow Raiders, Barrow Raiders Ladies	Championship; Women's Super League
23	Cougar Park	Keighley	7,500	Keighley Cougars	Championship
24	Mount Pleasant	Batley	7,500	Batley Bulldogs	Championship
25	Recreation Ground	Whitehaven	7,500	Whitehaven	Championship
26	Eirias Stadium	Colwyn Bay	6,080	North Wales Crusaders	Championship
27	The Gnoll	Neath	6,000	Wales, Wales Women	N/A
28	Crown Flatt	Dewsbury	5,100	Huddersfield Giants Dewsbury Rams	Super League Championship
29	Fartown Ground	Huddersfield	5,000	St Joseph's ARLC	
30	South Leeds Stadium	Beeston, Leeds	4,000	Hunslet	Championship
31	Olympic Legacy Stadium	Sheffield	3,900	Sheffield Eagles	Championship
32	Heywood Road	Sale	3,387	Swinton Lions	Championship
33	Edge Hall Road	Wigan	3,000	Wigan Warriors Women	Women's Super League

== Former stadiums ==
=== Stadiums no longer used for rugby league ===
Stadium	City	Club	Capacity	Last used
Alexander Stadium	Birmingham	Midlands Hurricanes	18,000	2025
Barnet Copthall	Hendon, London	London Broncos	10,500	1995
Brewery Field	Bridgend	Crusaders	8,000	2009
Butts Park Arena	Coventry	Coventry Bears	4,000	2021
Coundon Road Stadium	Coventry	Coventry Bears	9,000	2004
Craven Cottage	Fulham, London	London Broncos	22,384	1984
Crystal Palace National Sports Centre	Crystal Palace, London	London Broncos	16,000	1993
Deepdale	Preston	Lancashire Lynx	23,404	2000
Elland Road	Beeston, Leeds	Hunslet	37,608	1995
Leeds Greyhound Stadium	Beeston, Leeds	Hunslet		1980
Gateshead International Stadium	Gateshead	Gateshead Thunder	11,800	2014
Griffin Park	Brentford, London	London Broncos	12,300	2006
The Gnoll	Heath	South Wales Scorpions	6,000	2013
Iffley Road	Oxford	Oxford	500	2017
Kirklees Stadium	Huddersfield	Huddersfield Giants	24,500	2026
Memorial Ground	Penryn	Cornwall	4,000	2025
Polytechnic Stadium	Fulham, London	London Broncos		1990
Portway Stadium	Birmingham	Midlands Hurricanes	3,000	2022
Queensway Stadium	Wrexham	North Wales Crusaders	8,256	2020
Racecourse Ground	Wrexham	North Wales Crusaders	15,500	2016
The Hive Stadium	Canons Park, London	London Broncos	6,500	2015
Trailfinders Sports Ground	West Ealing, London	London Broncos	5,000	2021
Twickenham Stoop	Twickenham, London	London Broncos	14,800	2013
White Hart Lane Community Sports Centre	Wood Green, London	London Skolars	5,000	2023
Woodlands Memorial Ground	Lytham St Annes	Blackpool Panthers	9,000	2010
The Valley	Charlton, London	London Broncos	27,111	2000
Victory Park	Chorley	Chorley Lynx	4,300	2004

=== Demolished stadiums ===
Year	Club	Defunct Stadium	Replacement Stadium
1973	Hunslet	Parkside	
1988	Rochdale Hornets	Athletic Grounds	Spotland Stadium
1989	Hull Kingston Rovers	Old Craven Park	New Craven Park
1991	Dewsbury Rams	Old Crown Flatt	Crown Flatt
1992	Swinton Lions	Station Road	Gigg Lane
1997	Oldham	Watersheddings	Boundary Park
1998	Halifax Panthers	Thrum Hall	The Shay
1999	Wigan Warriors	Central Park	DW Stadium
2002	Hull F.C.	The Boulevard	MKM Stadium
2004	Warrington Wolves	Wilderspool	Halliwell Jones Stadium
2006	Doncaster	Belle Vue	Keepmoat Stadium
2009	Leigh Leopards	Hilton Park	Leigh Sports Village
2010	St Helens	Knowsley Road	Langtree Park
2011	Salford Red Devils	The Willows	City of Salford Stadium
2013	Sheffield Eagles	Don Valley Stadium	Sheffield Olympic Legacy Stadium
2014	York Knights	Huntington Stadium	York Community Stadium

== Future stadiums ==
Stadiums which are currently in development, and are likely to open in the near future, include:

Stadium	Expected capacity	Club	Notes
Five Towns Stadium	15,000	Castleford Tigers	
The Jungle (Wheldon Road) (Redevelopment)	11,775	Castleford Tigers	In April 2022, Castleford announced alternative plans to their new stadium project. The club would use £2m grant from Wakefield Councils Rugby League Resilience Fund and funds from the new employment site proposed at the site of the new stadium. The club would then build a new main stand and modernise and redevelop the 3 other existing stands.
Cougar Park (Redevelopment)	7,800	Keighley Cougars	Keighley announced plans for a new 2,000 capacity main stand in April 2023 that would be partly funded by the £33m Keighley Towns Fund. It will replace the original stand that dates back to the 1930s and include classrooms, a cafe, health suite and better facilities for the media and TV crews.
New Swinton Stadium	6,000	Swinton Lions	

There are usually also several expansions to existing grounds in progress.

== Event stadiums ==
Several stadiums in the UK are used for regular events during the British rugby league season.

Stadium	Town / City	Capacity	Event
Wembley Stadium	Wembley, London	90,000	Challenge Cup Final, Women's Challenge Cup Final
Old Trafford	Old Trafford, Manchester	74,310	Super League Grand Final

== See also ==
- List of rugby league stadiums by capacity
- List of Australian rugby league stadiums
- List of stadiums in the United Kingdom by capacity
- List of English rugby union stadiums by capacity
