= 2012–2014 Super League licences =

2012–2014 Super League Licensing
- Duration: 3 Years

Licence
- Awarded to: Widnes Vikings

The 2012–14 Super League licences were awarded following the second round of licensing for the Super League rugby league competition. Successful applicants were given a three-year licence to compete in Super League, the premier rugby league competition in Europe.

== Applications ==
Applications for licences were accepted from all Super League clubs and Championship clubs could apply if they met certain criteria:

1. they competed in the 2009 or 2010 Grand Finals, or won the Northern Rail Cup
2. they had a stadium with a capacity of over 10,000
3. they had not been insolvent at any point since 2008
4. they had a turnover of at least £1 million in 2009 or 2010
5. they had an average attendance of over 2500 in 2009 or 2010

The applicants were:

Applicants
Club	Location	Stadium	Capacity*	League
Barrow Raiders	Barrow, Cumbria	Craven Park		Championship
Bradford Bulls	Bradford, West Yorkshire	Odsal Stadium	27,000	Super League
Castleford Tigers	Castleford, West Yorkshire	Wheldon Road	12,000	Super League
Catalans Dragons	Perpignan, France		13,000	Super League
Celtic Crusaders	Wrexham, Wales	Racecourse Ground	15,000	Super League
Halifax	Halifax, West Yorkshire	The Shay	15,000	Championship
Harlequins	Twickenham, London	Twickenham Stoop	14,000	Super League
Hull F.C.	Hull, East Yorkshire	KC Stadium	25,000	Super League
Hull Kingston Rovers	Hull, East Yorkshire	Craven Park	12,225	Super League
Huddersfield Giants	Huddersfield, West Yorkshire	Kirklees Stadium	24,000	Super League
Leeds Rhinos	Leeds, West Yorkshire	Headingley Stadium	21,000	Super League
Salford City Reds	Salford, Greater Manchester	The Willows	11,363	Super League
St. Helens	St. Helens, Merseyside	Knowsley Road	17,500	Super League
Wakefield Trinity Wildcats	Wakefield, West Yorkshire	Belle Vue	12,000	Super League
Warrington Wolves	Warrington, Cheshire	Halliwell Jones Stadium	15,000	Super League
Widnes Vikings	Widnes, Cheshire	Halton Stadium	13,000	Championship
Wigan Warriors	Wigan, Greater Manchester	DW Stadium	25,000	Super League

Applications were made in 2011, and the Rugby Football League, operators of Super League, announced that at least one applicant from the Co-operative Championship would be accepted.

Eligible applicants from the Championship were: Halifax, Barrow Raiders, Featherstone Rovers, Widnes Vikings and Batley Bulldogs. Of these, only Halifax, Widnes and Barrow applied.

== 2009–11 commitments ==
Talking about the progress of some clubs towards fulfilling their commitments to either upgrade their stadium facilities and move to new ones during the 2009–11 three year licence period, Gary Tasker warned of "the potential implications [of] any failure to do so may have on their next application. Clubs need to be aware that we are raising the bar for the next licence period." "Showcasing Super League in high quality stadium facilities remains a key objective," he said.

In July 2009, the RFL was reported to have warned Salford City Reds, Castleford Tigers and Wakefield Trinity Wildcats, of which none had started construction on a new stadium, that progress must be made in order to avoid jeopardising their chances of obtaining a second Super League licence. St Helens RLFC and Celtic Crusaders (later Crusaders Rugby League) were also warned, but were reported to have a likely chance of having a new stadium by 2012. The news came just over a week after Widnes Vikings, who already had a new stadium, won their Northern Rail Cup Final against Barrow Raiders; a key criterion for non-Super League clubs to obtain a first licence. Following this report, all of the named Super League teams made moves to address stadium concerns:

- Salford City originally planned to move into the new Salford City Stadium for the 2011 season, but construction delays pushed back the date to 2012.
- Castleford are also building a new stadium. It was also intended to be open for 2011, but was ultimately pushed back to 2013.
- Wakefield had plans to build a new stadium in Stanley, hoping to move in no later than the 2012 season. After the plans fell through, they announced that they would extensively renovate their existing Belle Vue ground to meet new stadium requirements.
- St Helens built a new stadium that was initially expected to open sometime in 2011, but was delayed to January 2012. They agreed to groundshare with Widnes in 2011, presumably as a hedge against construction delays.
- Crusaders (who dropped "Celtic" from their name after the 2009 season) moved to the larger Racecourse Ground in Wrexham, the largest town in North Wales (an area that did not have a professional team in either rugby code). It is also close to the M62 corridor that has been the traditional heartland of league in England.

== Results ==
=== Number of teams ===
No upper limit on the number of Super League licences awarded had initially been set by the RFL, the option remained open to expand again in the future. Increasing the number of teams in the competition without changing the competition's format would be at odds with recent RFL and Super League decisions and reports. The RFL's plan for international success, which was the result of an inquiry into England's poor performance at the 2008 World Cup, states an intention to work with clubs to limit the number of games top players can take part in. The Magic Weekend event has allowed for a reduction in the number of games each club plays to 27, from 28; although a reason for the desire to reduce games in this case was to reduce the number of times Super League sides played each other more than twice in the regular season.

RFL Chief Executive Nigel Wood said, "The best performing [Championship] club will be guaranteed admission to Super League, either at the expense of the worst performing club or by expanding the competition," he said.

On 4 August 2010, the RFL announced that the number of licences would remain at 14. Once Widnes were granted a licence, the RFL's decision meant that at least one existing Super League club would be left out of the competition.

The final Super League lineup for the 2012–14 period was set on 26 July 2011, when Crusaders announced that they had withdrawn their application for a licence, believing that they were not financially able to sustain themselves in Super League in the near future. The club had gone into administration after the 2010 season, This decision provided a reprieve for Wakefield Trinity, who had been expected to be denied a licence after also going into administration in the 2010–11 close season. Crusaders' former place in Super League was filled by Widnes.

=== Outcome ===
A summary of licence applications was released with a grading of each club's application by the RFL on 8 September 2011. Clubs were graded as follows:

Super League Licences
A licence	B licence	C licence
Hull F.C.	Bradford Bulls	Castleford Tigers
Leeds Rhinos	St. Helens	Widnes Vikings †
Warrington Wolves	Catalans Dragons	Halifax ‡
Wigan Warriors	Huddersfield Giants	Harlequins
	Hull Kingston Rovers	Salford City Reds
		Wakefield Trinity Wildcats

†	Team elevated to Super League
‡	Awarded licence but not promoted

- Barrow Raiders did not meet the criteria for a C licence and Crusaders withdrew their application.

Using the RFL criteria, there has been an increase in the standard of Super League clubs on the previous licensing period. Wigan Warriors improved from a B to an A licence. Catalans Dragons, Hull Kingston Rovers and Huddersfield Giants improved from a C to a B licence. There were three additional applications, with only one not meeting minimum requirements.

On 31 March 2011, Widnes were granted a licence for the 2012-2014 Super League seasons. Halifax had also met the requirements for a licence, but were not awarded one. Barrow had failed with their licence bid.

== The future: 2015–17 licences ==
Planning for the next licence period, 2015–17, began in 2009. The RFL, working with its members in Super League and the Championship to agree minimum standards in Business Management, Facilities, Finance, Commercial/Marketing/Community and Playing Strength/Performance.

Gary Tasker, the RFL's Director of Development, reiterated: "Clubs need to be aware that we are raising the bar for the next licence period and showcasing the Super League competition in high quality, 21st Century stadium facilities remains a key strategic objective."

This was, however, a complete waste of time as the RFL decided on a completely new structure for the 2015 Super League season which included bringing back promotion and relegation.

However in 2023, the RFL in association with IMG effectively brought back licensing in the form of Grading, a more robust points operated system that ranked every professional club.
