= List of rugby league stadiums by capacity =

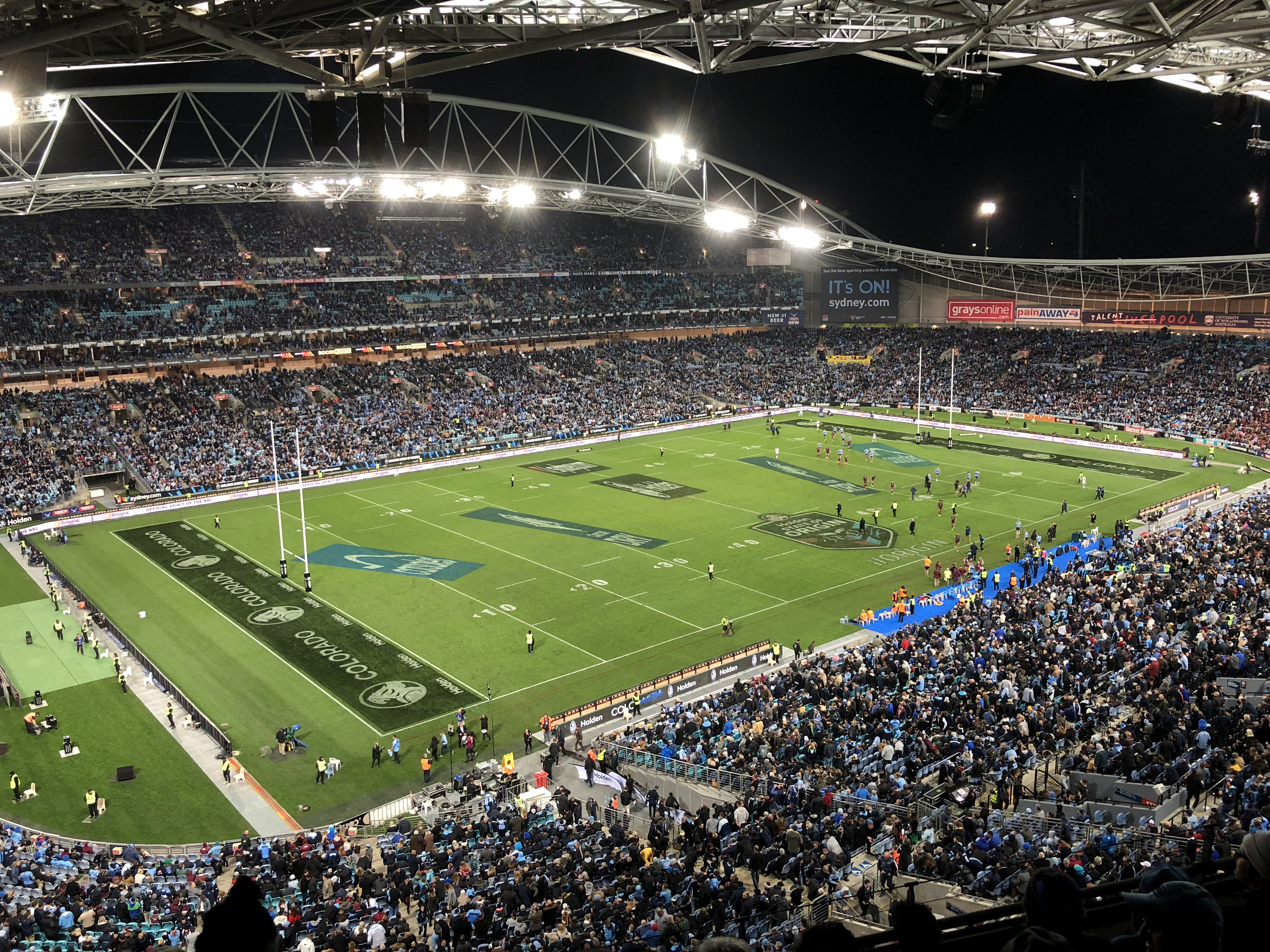
Stadium Australia, home of the NRL Grand Final.

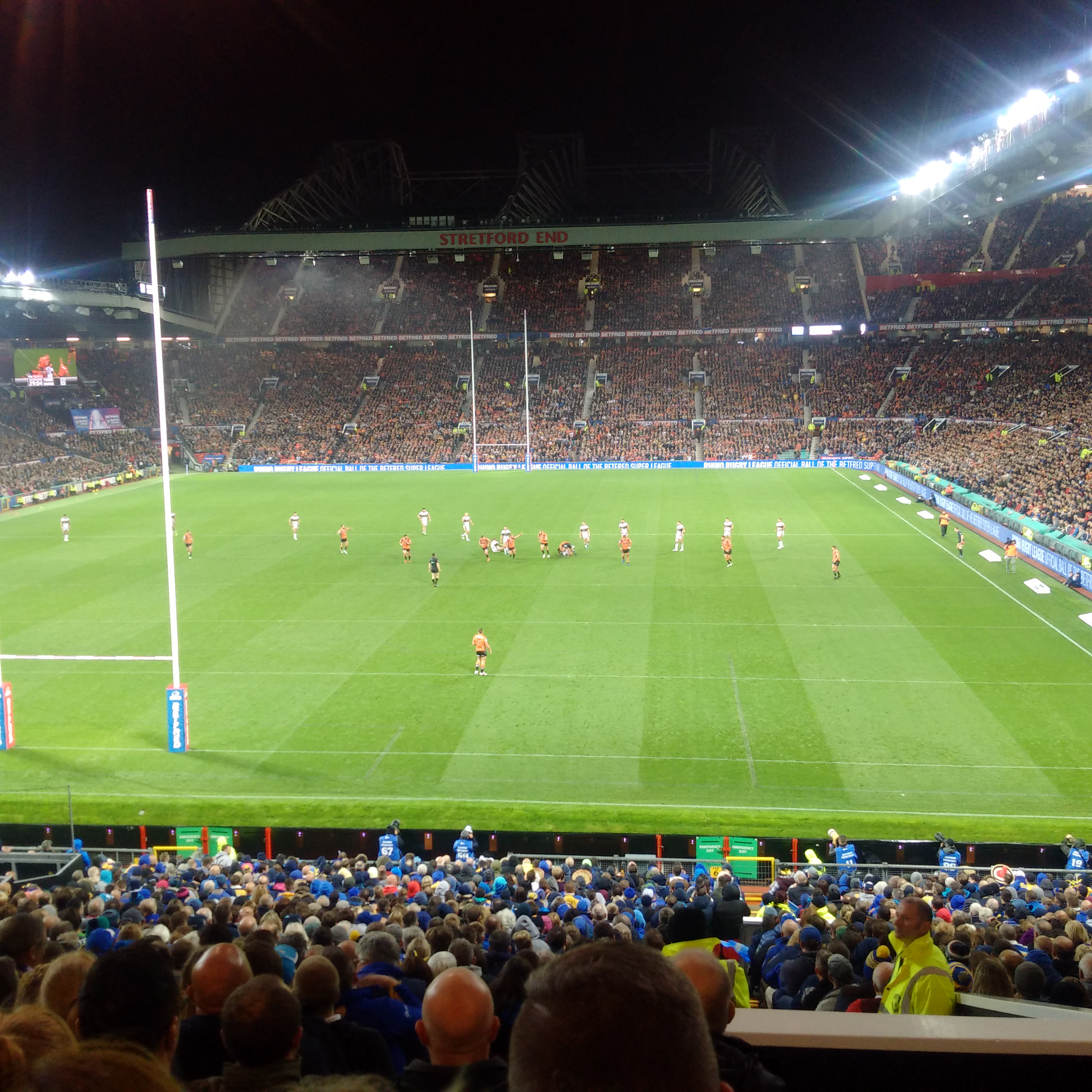
Old Trafford, home of the Super League Grand Final.

The following is a list of stadiums at which rugby league is played, ordered by seating capacity.

All stadiums with a capacity of 5,000 or more which are the regular home venue of a club or national team, or are the regular hosts of a major competition (such as the State of Origin series or the final of an annual national competition), are included. Stadiums for which the only rugby league use is hosting occasional matches or which have only hosted one-off rugby league tournaments are not included. Not all of these stadiums are primarily venues for rugby league, with some being primarily venues for another sport.

== Current stadiums ==
#	Stadium	Capacity	City/town	Country	Tenants & events hosted	Image
1	Wembley Stadium	90,000	London	England	Challenge Cup Final	
2	Stadium Australia	83,500	Sydney	Australia	Canterbury Bulldogs, South Sydney Rabbitohs, NRL Grand Final, New South Wales Blues, Australia national team.	
3	Old Trafford	74,994	Manchester	England	Super League Grand Final	
4	Docklands Stadium	56,347	Melbourne	Australia	Melbourne Storm, Australia national team	
5	Lang Park	52,500	Brisbane	Australia	Brisbane Broncos, Queensland Maroons, Australia national team	
6	Sydney Football Stadium	42,500	Sydney	Australia	Sydney Roosters, South Sydney Rabbitohs	
7	Newcastle International Sports Centre	33,000	Newcastle	Australia	Newcastle Knights	
8	Melbourne Rectangular Stadium	33,000	Melbourne	Australia	Melbourne Storm	
9	Western Sydney Stadium	30,000	Sydney	Australia	Parramatta Eels, Wests Tigers	
10	Henson Park	30,000	Sydney	Australia	Newtown Jets	
11	Mount Smart Stadium	30,000	Auckland	New Zealand	New Zealand Warriors, New Zealand national team, Akarana Falcons	
12	Odsal Stadium	27,491	Odsal	England	Bradford Bulls	
13	Robina Stadium	27,400	Gold Coast	Australia	Gold Coast Titans	
14	RZD Arena	27,320	Moscow	Russia	RC Lokomotiv Moscow	
15	MKM Stadium	25,404	Kingston upon Hull	England	Hull FC	
16	Brick Community Stadium	25,133	Wigan	England	Wigan Warriors	
17	Canberra Stadium	25,011	Canberra	Australia	Canberra Raiders	
18	North Queensland Stadium	25,000	Townsville	Australia	North Queensland Cowboys	
19	Kirklees Stadium	24,121	Huddersfield	England	Huddersfield Giants	
20	Brookvale Oval	23,000	Sydney	Australia	Manly-Warringah Sea Eagles	
21	Wollongong Showground	23,000	Wollongong	Australia	St George Illawarra Dragons	
22	Penrith Stadium	22,500	Sydney	Australia	Penrith Panthers	
23	International Olympic Stadium	22,400	Tripoli	Lebanon	Lebanon national team	
24	Endeavour Field	22,000	Sydney	Australia	Cronulla-Sutherland Sharks	
25	Headingley	21,062	Leeds	England	Leeds Rhinos	
26	Jubilee Oval	20,505	Sydney	Australia	St George Illawarra Dragons	
27	Perth Rectangular Stadium	20,500	Perth	Australia	West Coast Pirates	
28	Campbelltown Stadium	20,000	Sydney	Australia	Western Suburbs Magpies, Wests Tigers	
29	Lidcombe Oval	20,000	Sydney	Australia	Auburn Warriors	
30	North Sydney Oval	20,000	Sydney	Australia	North Sydney Bears	
31	Barlow Park	18,000	Cairns	Australia	Northern Pride RLFC	
32	Rugby League Park	18,000	Christchurch	New Zealand	Canterbury Bulls	
33	Totally Wicked Stadium	18,000	St Helens	England	St Helens RFC	
34	North Hobart Oval	18,000	Hobart	Australia	Melbourne Storm	
35	Parc des Sports	17,518	Avignon	France	France national team	
36	Bislett Stadium	15,400	Oslo	Norway	Norway national team	
37	Keepmoat Stadium	15,231	Doncaster	England	Doncaster RLFC	
38	Halliwell Jones Stadium	15,200	Warrington	England	Warrington Wolves	
39	Apia Park	15,000	Apia	Samoa	Samoa national team	
40	National Stadium	15,000	Suva	Fiji	Fiji national team	
41	Seiffert Oval	15,000	Canberra	Australia	Queanbeyan Blues	
42	National Football Stadium	14,800	Port Moresby	Papua New Guinea	Papua New Guinea national team, Port Moresby Vipers, Papua New Guinea Hunters	
43	The Shay	14,061	Halifax	England	Halifax Panthers	
44	Gladsaxe Stadium	13,507	Copenhagen	Denmark	Denmark national team	
45	Avanhard Stadium	13,466	Rivne	Ukraine	Ukraine national team	
46	DCBL Stadium	13,350	Widnes	England	Widnes Vikings	
47	Stadium Municipal d'Albi	13,058	Albi	France	Racing Club Albi XIII	
48	Stade Gilbert Brutus	13,000	Perpignan	France	Catalans Dragons, Catalonia national team	
49	Craven Park	12,225	Kingston upon Hull	England	Hull Kingston Rovers	
50	Stadium Mackay	12,200	Mackay	Australia	Mackay Cutters	
51	Hodges Stadium	12,000	Jacksonville	United States	United States national team, Jacksonville Axemen	
52	Leigh Sports Village	12,000	Leigh	England	Leigh Centurions	
53	Salford Community Stadium	12,000	Eccles	England	Salford Red Devils	
54	Sunshine Coast Stadium	12,000	Kawana Waters	Australia	Sunshine Coast Falcons	
55	Wheldon Road	11,775	Castleford	England	Castleford Tigers	
56	Kingston Park	10,200	Newcastle upon Tyne	England	Newcastle Thunder	
57	Derwent Park	10,000	Workington	England	Workington Town	
58	Dolphin Oval	10,000	Kippa-Ring	Australia	Redcliffe Dolphins, Dolphins (NRL)	
59	Spotland Stadium	10,000	Rochdale	England	Rochdale Hornets	
60	Stade d'Albert Domec	10,000	Carcassonne	France	AS Carcassonne	
61	Teufaiva Sport Stadium	10,000	Nuku'Alofa	Tonga	TNRL Grand Final	
62	Nickerson Field	9,871	Boston	United States	Boston Thirteens	
63	Post Office Road	9,850	Featherstone	England	Featherstone Rovers	
64	Lamport Stadium	9,600	Toronto	Canada	Canada national team, Toronto Wolfpack	
65	Belle Vue	9,333	Wakefield	England	Wakefield Trinity	
66	York Community Stadium	8,500	York	England	York Knights, York Valkyrie	
67	Queensway Stadium	8,256	Wrexham	Wales	North Wales Crusaders	
68	Browne Park	8,000	Wandal	Australia	Central Queensland Capras	
69	Tuks Stadium	8,000	Hatfield	South Africa	TUKS Blues	
70	Cougar Park	7,800	Keighley	England	Keighley Cougars	
71	Craven Park	7,600	Barrow-in-Furness	England	Barrow Raiders, Cumbria rugby league team	
72	Mount Pleasant	7,500	Batley	England	Batley Bulldogs	
73	Recreation Ground	7,500	Whitehaven	England	Whitehaven RLFC, Cumbria rugby league team	
74	Carlisle Grounds	7,000	Bray	(Republic of Ireland) Ireland	Ireland national team	
75	Kalabond Oval	7,000	Kokopo	Papua New Guinea	Rabaul Gurias	
76	Stade Sabathé	6,500	Montpellier	France	Montpellier Red Devils	
77	Széktói Stadion	6,300	Kecskemét	Hungary	Hungary national team	
78	Stade du Moulin	6,000	Lézignan-Corbières	France	Lézignan Sangliers	
79	Stade Municipal	6,000	Saint-Esteve	France	Saint-Esteve XIII Catalan	
80	Spec Martin Stadium	6,000	DeLand	United States	Central Florida Warriors	
81	North Ipswich Reserve	5,500	Ipswich	Australia	Ipswich Jets	
82	Crown Flatt	5,100	Dewsbury	England	Dewsbury Rams	
83	Atlanta Silverbacks Park	5,000	Chamblee	United States	Atlanta Rhinos	
84	Avarua Tereora Stadium	5,000	Avarua	Cook Islands	Cook Islands national team	
85	BMD Kougari Oval	5,000	Manly West	Australia	Wynnum-Manly Seagulls	
86	Fritz-Grunebaum-Sportpark	5,000	Heidelberg	Germany	Germany national team	
87	H.E. Laybutt Field	5,000	Blacktown	Australia	Blacktown Workers Sea Eagles	
88	Langlands Park	5,000	Coorparoo	Australia	Easts Tigers	
89	Mount Pritchard Oval	5,000	Mount Pritchard	Australia	Mount Pritchard Mounties	
90	Port Vila Municipal Stadium	5,000	Port Vila	Vanuatu	Vanuatu national team	
91	Redfern Oval	5,000	Sydney	Australia	Redfern All Blacks	
92	Ringrose Park	5,000	Wentworthville	Australia	Wentworthville Magpies	
93	Stade de la Roseraie	5,000	Carpentras	France	RC Carpentras XIII	
94	Stade de l'Aiguille	5,000	Limoux	France	Limoux Grizzlies	
95	Stade Georges Lyvet	5,000	Lyon	France	Lyon Villeurbanne XIII	
96	Stade Jules Ribet	5,000	Saint-Gaudens	France	Saint-Gaudens Bears	
97	Stade Max Rousie	5,000	Villeneuve-sur-Lot	France	Villeneuve XIII RLLG	
98	Stade Municipal de Berrechid	5,000	Berrechid	Morocco	Morocco national team	
99	White Hart Lane Community Sports Centre	5,000	Wood Green	England	London Skolars	

== Former or demolished stadiums ==
Stadium	Capacity	City/Town	Country	Home team/s	Closed (as a RL stadium)	Fate
Wembley Stadium	100,000	London	England	Challenge Cup Final	1999	Closed in 2000, demolished in 2003. Site is now the New Wembley Stadium.
Queensland Sport & Athletics Centre	60,000	Brisbane	Australia	Brisbane Broncos	2003	Remains in use for athletics and football, capacity is now 48,500
Sydney Football Stadium	44,000	Sydney	Australia	Sydney Roosters	2018	demolished and replaced by Sydney Football Stadium (2022)
Sydney Sports Ground	35,000	Sydney	Australia	Eastern Suburbs	1986	Demolished in 1987. Site is now the car park for the Sydney Football Stadium.
Willows Sports Complex	26,500	Townsville	Australia	North Queensland Cowboys	2019	Demolished in 2022.
Belmore Sports Ground	25,000	Sydney	Australia	Canterbury-Bankstown Bulldogs	1998	Still in use, currently the training base of the Bulldogs
Carrara Stadium	25,000	Carrara	Australia	Gold Coast Titans	2007	Still in use for AFL.
Don Valley Stadium	25,000	Sheffield	England	Sheffield Eagles	2013	Demolished in 2013.
WACA Ground	24,500	Perth	Australia	Western Reds	1997	Re-developed in 2002, Still in use for cricket.
Parramatta Stadium	24,000	Sydney	Australia	Parramatta Eels	2017	Demolished in 2017. Site is now the new Western Sydney Stadium.
Redfern Oval	23,000	Sydney	Australia	South Sydney	1987	Re-developed in 2009, currently the training base of the Rabbitohs. Capacity is now 5,000.
Ninian Park	21,508	Cardiff	Wales	Cardiff City	2009	Demolished in 2009. Now the Ninian Park housing estate.
Stade Sébastien Charléty	20,000	Paris	France	Paris Saint-Germain	1997	Remains in use for athletics, football (Paris FC) and rugby union (temporary home of Stade Français). French national team sometimes play at the venue.
Lidcombe Oval	20,000	Sydney	Australia	Western Suburbs Magpies	1986	Still in use for rugby league, rugby union, and football.
Olympic Park Stadium	18,500	Melbourne	Australia	Melbourne Storm	2009	Demolished in 2011. Now an AFL training oval.
Central Park	18,000	Wigan	England	Wigan Warriors	1999	Demolished in 1999.
Hindmarsh Stadium	17,500	Adelaide	Australia	Adelaide Rams	1997	2 more NRL matches were held at the stadium in 2006 and 2009. Still in use for football.
Knowsley Road	17,500	St Helens	England	St Helens RFC	2010	Demolished in 2010.
Carlaw Park	17,000	Auckland	New Zealand	New Zealand national team	2002	Closed in 2002, demolished in 2006. Site now contains a new student village complex for Auckland University.
Twickenham Stoop	14,800	London	England	London Broncos	2013	Still in use for rugby union.
Gateshead International Stadium	11,800	Gateshead	England	Gateshead Thunder	2014	Still in use for football.
The Willows	11,363	Salford	England	Salford Red Devils	2011	Demolished in 2012.
Belle Vue	11,500	Doncaster	England	Doncaster RLFC	2006	Demolished in 2007. Redeveloped as a housing estate.
Station Road	c. 11,000	Pendlebury	England	Swinton Lions	1992	Demolished in 1992.
The Boulevard	10,500	Hull	England	Hull F.C.	2000	Demolished in 2010.
Thrum Hall	9,832	Halifax	England	Halifax Panthers	1998	Demolished in 1999.
Wilderspool Stadium	9,200	Warrington	England	Warrington Wolves	2012	Demolished in 2014.
Bootham Crescent	8,256	York	England	York City Knights	2020	Residential development.
Barnet Copthall	5,000	London	England	London Crusaders	1994	Remains in use for its original purpose of athletics. Reopened as a rugby union stadium in February 2013, under the name Allianz Park, as home of Saracens.
St Helen's Rugby and Cricket Ground	4,500	Swansea	Wales		2012	Still in use as a rugby union and cricket ground.

== Future stadiums ==
Stadium name	Capacity	City	Country	Years	Home team/s
Macquarie Point Stadium	23,000	Hobart, Tasmania	Australia	2030	
Five Towns Stadium	13,300	Glasshoughton, Castleford	England	TBA	Castleford Tigers
New Swinton Stadium	6000	Agecroft, Pendlebury	England	TBA	Swinton

== See also ==
- Lists of stadiums
- List of Australian rugby league stadiums by capacity
- List of British rugby league stadiums by capacity
