= Super League licences =

Super League licences are issued periodically to rugby league football clubs that meet requirements for participation in the Super League, the premier rugby league competition for clubs from, e.g. the United Kingdom and France:

- 2009–11 Super League licences
- 2012–14 Super League licences
