= Michael Seatter =

English rugby & association footballer

Personal information
- Full name: Jerrey Michael Henry Falvey
- Born: 4 September 1945 Newark-on-Trent, England
- Died: 5 December 2008 (aged 63) Poitiers, France

Playing information

Rugby union
Club
| Years | Team | Pld | T | G | FG | P |
|---|---|---|---|---|---|---|
| | Llandaff RFC |

Rugby league
- Position: Wing
Club
| Years | Team | Pld | T | G | FG | P |
|---|---|---|---|---|---|---|
| 1967–≥67 | Wakefield Trinity | 9 | 1 | 2 | 0 | 7 |
Association football career
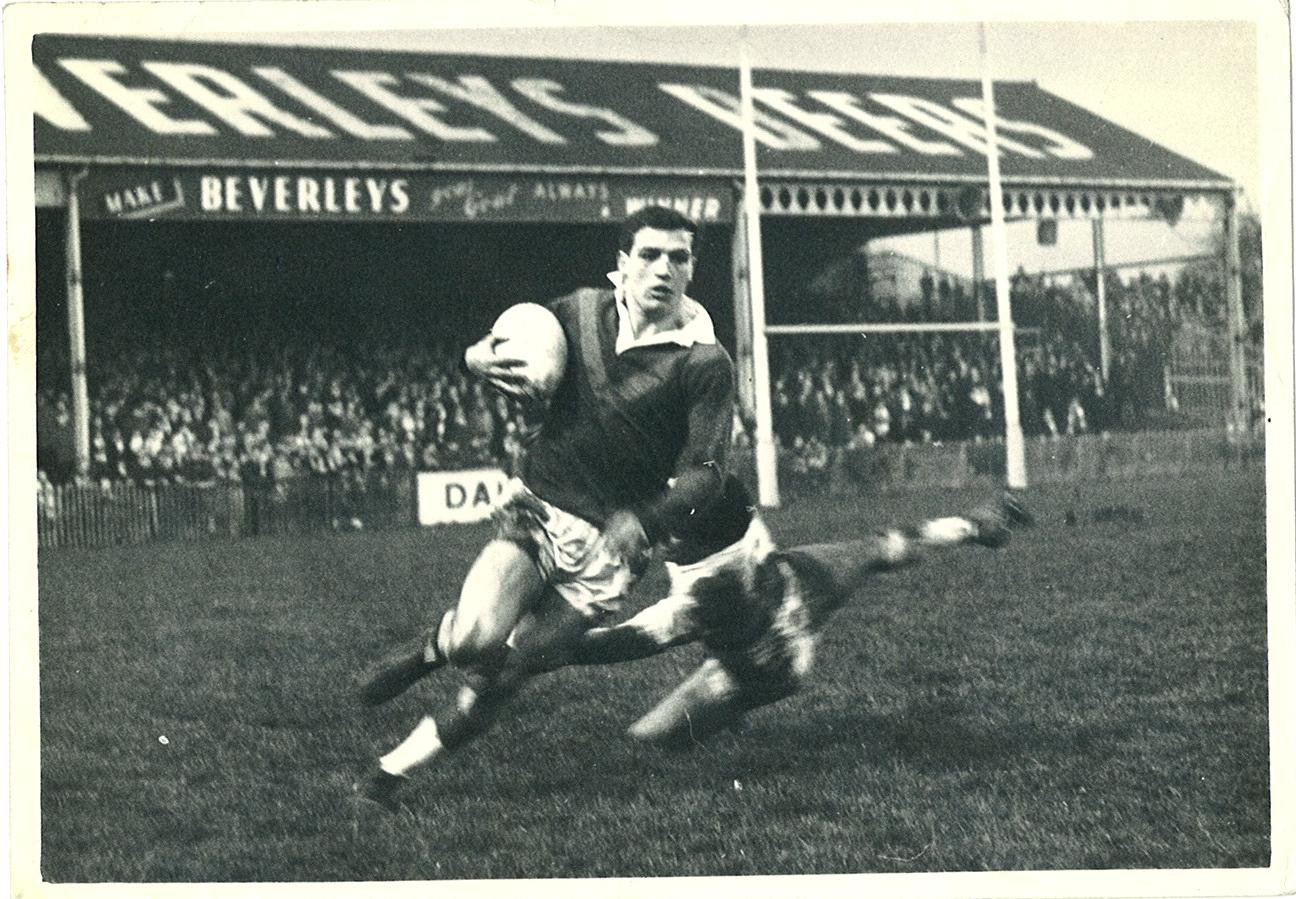
- Position: Winger
Senior career*
| Years | Team | Apps | (Gls) |
| –1967 | Barry Town | | |
- Magpies
International career
| 1973–74 | Jersey | | |
- * Club domestic league appearances and goals

Michael "Mike" Seatter (born Jerrey Michael Henry Falvey) (4 September 1945 – 5 December 2008) was a rugby union, and professional association football (soccer), and rugby league footballer who played in the 1960s and 1970s. He played club level rugby union (RU) for Llandaff RFC, representative level association football for Jersey, and at club level for Barry Town F.C. and Magpies (Jersey), as a winger, and club level rugby league (RL) for Wakefield Trinity, as a wing.

== Background ==
Michael Seatter was born in Newark-on-Trent, Nottinghamshire, England, and he died aged 63 from Leukaemia in Poitiers, France.

== Rugby league playing career ==
=== Club career ===
Michael Seatter made his début for Wakefield Trinity against Halifax at Belle Vue, Wakefield in 1967, he played his last match for Wakefield Trinity during the 1968–69 season.

== Association football (soccer) playing career ==
=== Muratti Vase ===
Michael Seatter played as a winger in Jersey's 4-1 victory over Guernsey in the 1973 Muratti Final at The Track, Guernsey, and in the 1-2 defeat (after extra time) in the 1974 Muratti Final Springfield Stadium, Jersey.
