= Newmarket Stadium =

Proposed stadium in Wakefield, England

Coordinates: 53.71454°N 1.47603°W

- Interactive map of Newmarket Stadium
- Location: Wakefield, West Yorkshire, England
- Operator: Wakefield & District Community Trust
- Capacity: 12,000

Tenant
- Wakefield Trinity

Newmarket Stadium was a proposed community stadium in Wakefield, which was to be leased to Wakefield Trinity in Stanley, Wakefield, West Yorkshire, England. It would have replaced Belle Vue which has been home to the rugby league club for over 100 years.

Wakefield Trinity were hoping to move into the stadium for the start of the 2015 season but work had not started on the project due to the conditions for development, implemented by the Secretary of State following a public inquiry, not being met. The conditions required that 60,000 square metres of warehousing had to be built out and occupied, while the trust responsible for the management of the stadium also had to provide funding towards the build cost

The development failed to get off the ground which led to Wakefield Trinity working with Wakefield Council to find a resolution and began redeveloping their current home at Belle Vue.

== See also ==
- List of rugby league stadiums by capacity
