= Seating capacity =

Number of people who can be seated in a specific space

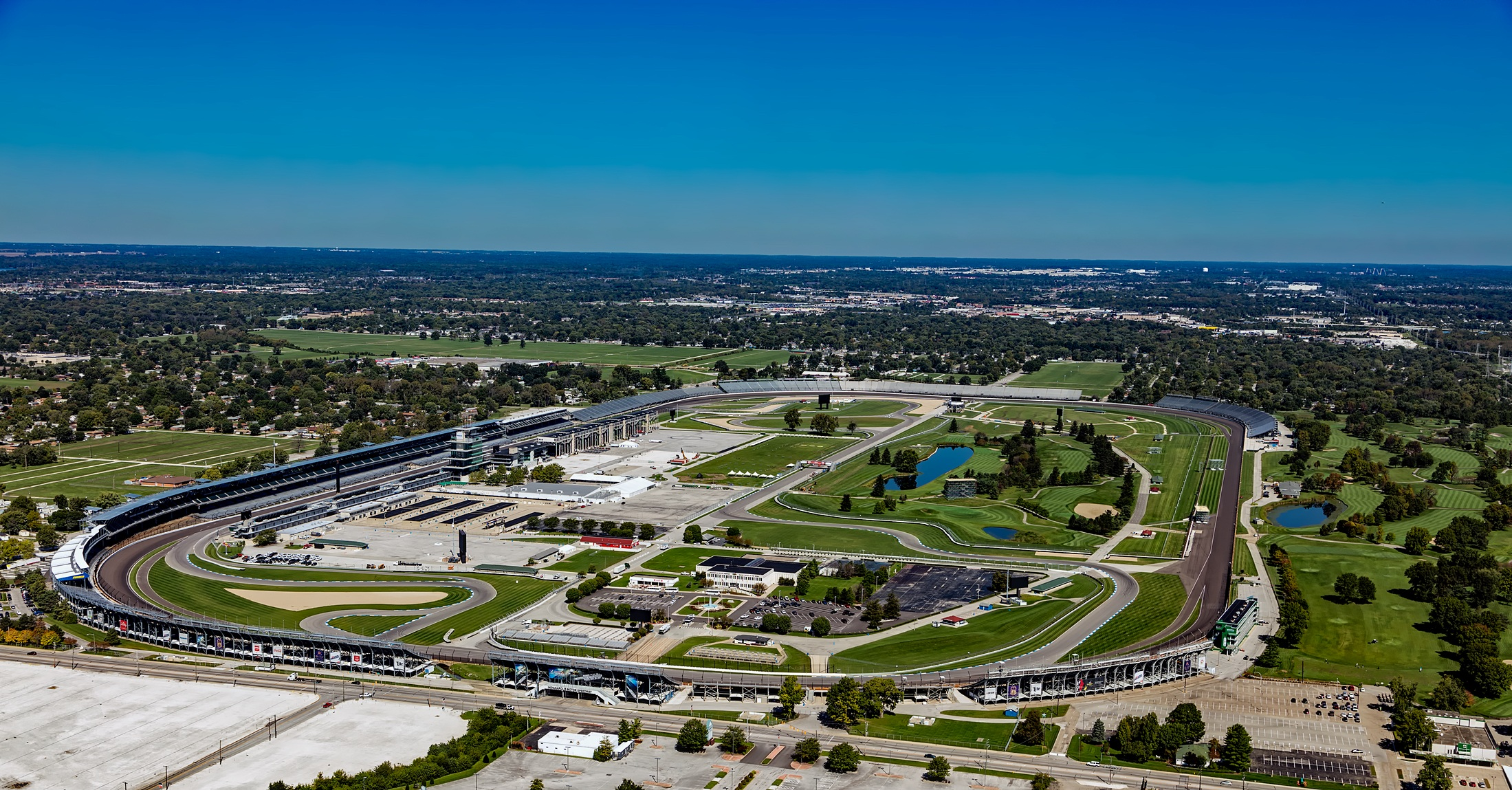
The Indianapolis Motor Speedway has the largest seating capacity of any venue in the world.

Seating capacity is the number of people who can be seated in a specific space or vehicle, in terms of both the physical space available and limitations set by law. Seating capacity can be used in the description of anything ranging from an automobile that seats two to a stadium that seats hundreds of thousands of people. The largest sports venue in the world, the Indianapolis Motor Speedway, has a permanent seating capacity for more than 235,000 people and infield seating that raises capacity to an approximate 400,000.

== In transport ==
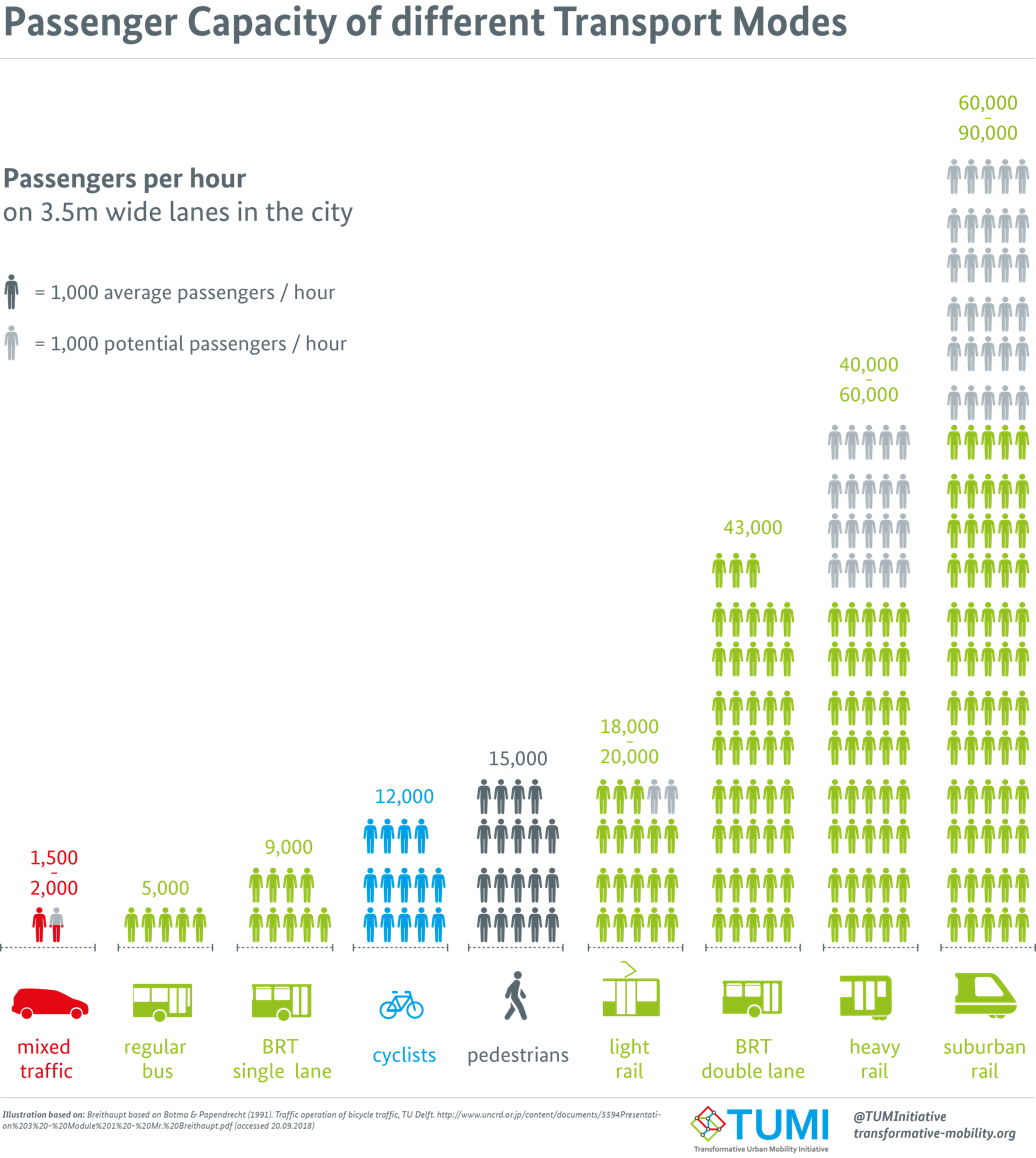
Passenger capacity of different transport modes

== In venues ==
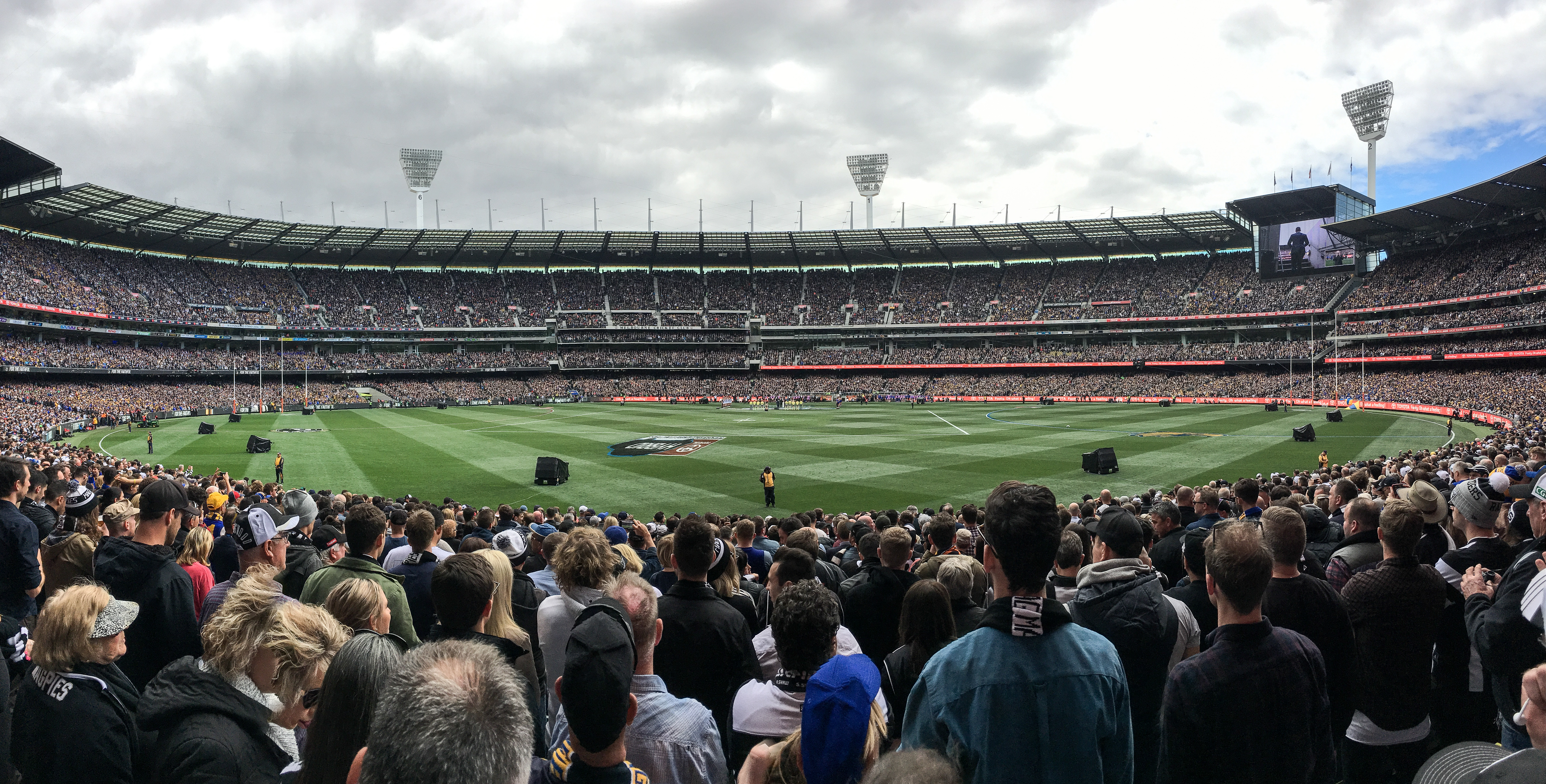
An aerial view of the Melbourne Cricket Ground during the 2018 AFL Grand Final, packed with 100,000 people

Safety is a primary concern in determining the seating capacity of a venue: "Seating capacity, seating layouts and densities are largely dictated by legal requirements for the safe evacuation of the occupants in the event of fire". The International Building Code specifies, "In places of assembly, the seats shall be securely fastened to the floor" but provides exceptions if the total number of seats is fewer than 100, if there is a substantial amount of space available between seats or if the seats are at tables. It also delineates the number of available exits for interior balconies and galleries based on the seating capacity, and sets forth the number of required wheelchair spaces in a table derived from the seating capacity of the space.

The International Fire Code, portions of which have been adopted by many jurisdictions, is directed more towards the use of a facility than the construction. It specifies, "For areas having fixed seating without dividing arms, the occupant load shall not be less than the number of seats based on one person for each 18 inches (457 mm) of seating length". It also requires that every public venue submit a detailed site plan to the local fire code official, including "details of the means of egress, seating capacity, [and] arrangement of the seating...."

Once safety considerations have been satisfied, determinations of seating capacity turn on the total size of the venue, and its purpose. For sports venues, the "decision on maximum seating capacity is determined by several factors. Chief among these are the primary sports program and the size of the market area". In motion picture venues, the "limit of seating capacity is determined by the maximal viewing distance for a given size of screen", with image quality for closer viewers declining as the screen is expanded to accommodate more distant viewers.

Seating capacity of venues also plays a role in what media they are able to provide and how they are able to provide it. In contracting to permit performers to use a theatre or other performing space, the "seating capacity of the performance facility must be disclosed". Seating capacity may influence the kind of contract to be used and the royalties to be given. The seating capacity must also be disclosed to the copyright owner in seeking a license for the copyrighted work to be performed in that venue.

Venues that may be leased for private functions such as ballrooms and auditoriums generally advertise their seating capacity. Seating capacity is also an important consideration in the construction and use of sports venues such as stadiums and arenas. When entities such as the National Football League's Super Bowl Committee decide on a venue for a particular event, seating capacity, which reflects the possible number of tickets that can be sold for the event, is an important consideration.

== Legal capacity and total capacity ==
Seating capacity differs from total capacity (sometimes called public capacity), which describes the total number of people who can fit in a venue or in a vehicle either sitting or standing. Where seating capacity is a legal requirement, however, as it is in movie theatres and on aircraft, the law reflects the fact that the number of people allowed in should not exceed the number who can be seated.

Use of the term "public capacity" indicates that a venue is allowed to hold more people than it can actually seat. Again, the maximum total number of people can refer to either the physical space available or limitations set by law.

== See also ==
- All-seater stadium
- List of stadiums by capacity
- List of association football stadiums by capacity
- List of American football stadiums by capacity
- List of rugby league stadiums by capacity
- List of rugby union stadiums by capacity
- List of tennis stadiums by capacity
- Seating assignment
