= Five Towns Stadium =

- Artist's impression of Five Towns Stadium
- Interactive map of Five Towns Stadium
- Location: Glasshoughton, Castleford, West Yorkshire, England
- Coordinates: 53.709°N 1.330°W
- Capacity: 13,300

Construction
- Opened: unknown
- Cost: £15 million

Tenant
- Castleford Tigers

The Five Towns Stadium, also known as Axiom, was a proposed rugby league stadium in Glasshoughton, Castleford, West Yorkshire, England. The stadium was intended to have a capacity of 13,300 spectators and would have replaced Wheldon Road which has been home to Castleford Tigers since 1927.

== Background ==
Work was expected to start on the new ground in late 2008, just off junction 32 of the M62. On 22 May 2009, the completion of a detailed draft design including details of the facilities to be included in the new ground and a building schedule was unveiled. The new stadium had been designed by Leeds- and London-based architect practice 'Ramsden and Partners'. Unfortunately no money could be found to fund the project and it was abandoned although Castleford still expressed their desire to move to a new stadium.

Planning permission was granted in early 2011 and the club aimed to move into the stadium for the 2013 Super League season however sponsorship money became unavailable and the stadium once again had to be put on hold.

In 2015 it was announced that there would be a stadium built at Glasshoughton as part of a new retail park called the Five Towns Park which would be on the same site as the stadium with work expected to start early 2016 and with a view of Castleford Tigers moving in by the 2019 season.

In late 2018 it was announced the new stadium was to be part of the new Axiom shopping complex.

Due to various financial hurdles Castleford have begun looking into redeveloping their current ground after the council announced it would give grants to the three clubs that fall under its governance.
