= Belle Vue (Wakefield) =

Stadium in Wakefield, England

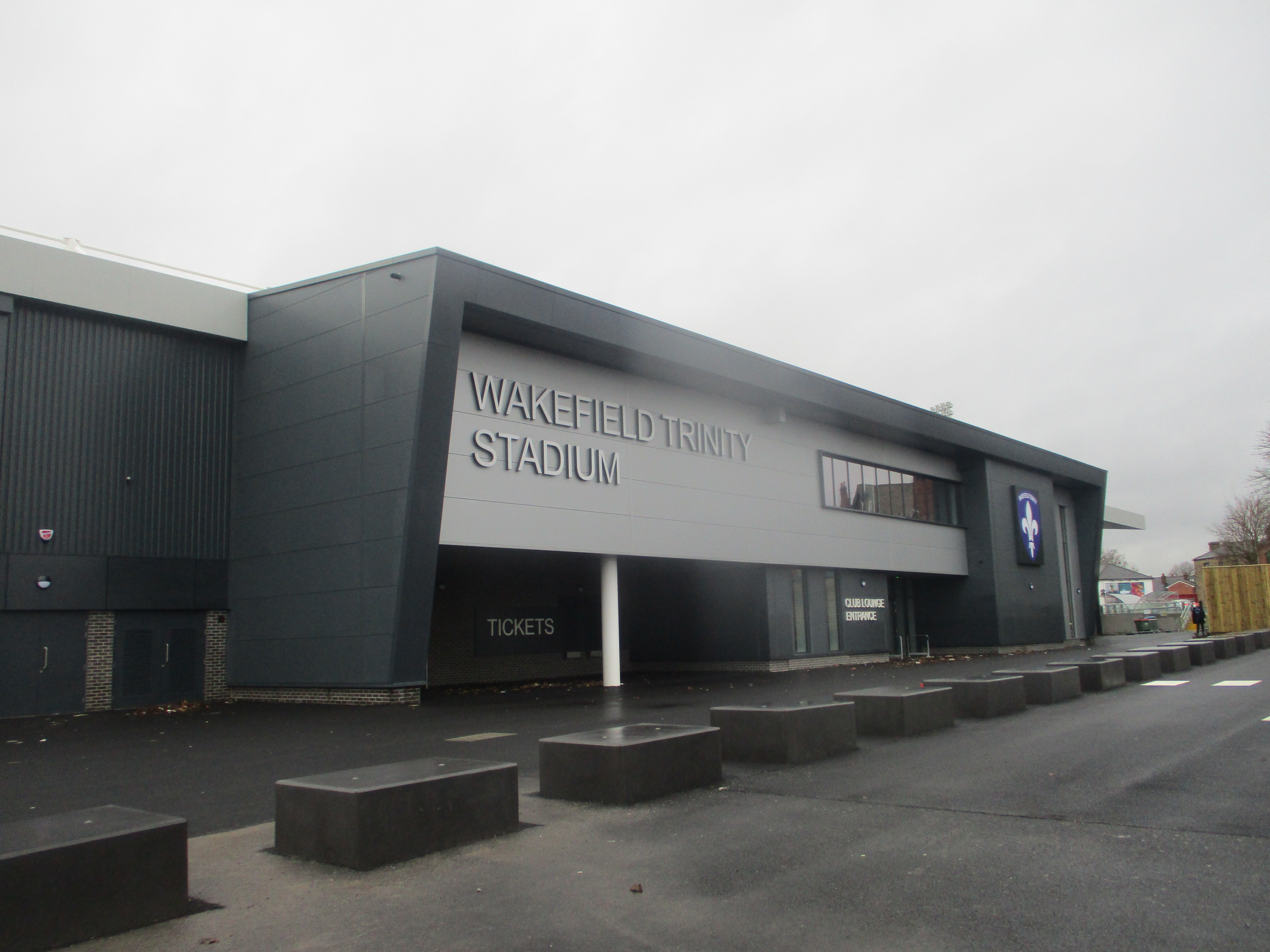
- Interactive map of Belle Vue
- Full name: DIY Kitchens Stadium
- Location: Doncaster Road, Wakefield, WF1 5EY, England
- Coordinates: 53°40′11″N 1°28′46″W
- Owner: Wakefield Trinity
- Operator: Wakefield Trinity
- Capacity: 9,252
- Surface: Grass and artificial mix
- Scoreboard: Philips Vidiwall
- Record attendance: 29,335 (1923)
- Field size: 120 by 74 yards (110 m × 68 m)
- Public transit: Sandal and Agbrigg; Wakefield Kirkgate

Construction
- Opened
- Renovated: 2011, 2022–25

Tenants
- Rugby League; Wakefield Trinity (1895–present); Sheffield Eagles (2017); Football; Wakefield F.C. (2000–2006, 2012–2014); Wakefield A.F.C. (2023–2024)

Belle Vue, also known as the DIY Kitchens Stadium for sponsorship reasons, in Wakefield, England, is the home of Rugby League club Wakefield Trinity RLFC and, previously, Association Football club Wakefield A.F.C. It is on the A638 Doncaster Road, a mile south of Wakefield city centre.

== History ==
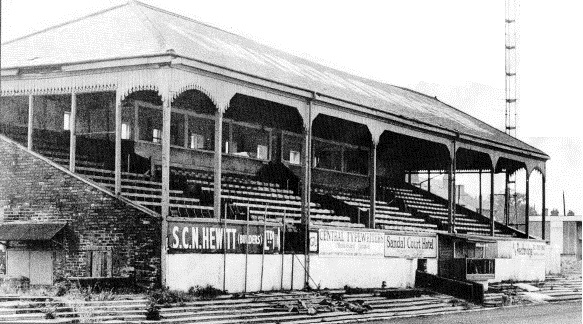
The original West Stand at Belle Vue

=== Early years ===
Wakefield Trinity originally played on Heath Common. In 1875–76, they moved to a ground near the Borough Market (near the current Trinity shopping centre). They returned to the Belle Vue area of Wakefield played on a ground behind the Alexandra Hotel near Elm Street. This is on the opposite side of the road from the present ground.

It remains unconfirmed when Wakefield Trinity moved to the present ground as Belle Vue is both an area of Wakefield and the name of the ground and people can confuse a mention of one for the other.

Reverend Marshall in "Football – the Rugby Union Game" (first published 1892) wrote, "the club migrated to Belle Vue on the opposite side of the road to the present field, and where the first cup ties were played. In the following year a move was made to the present field."

The Cup referred to is the Yorkshire Cup which was first played during the 1877–78 season. Wakefield Trinity's first Yorkshire Cup game was played on 8 December 1877 during the 1877–78 season. If Trinity played the "first cup ties" on the Elm Street ground in 1877, the "following year" would have been 1878.

However, in, "The Grounds of Rugby League" by Trevor R. Delaney gives the opening of the present ground as Easter Monday, 14 April 1879. This is based on the evidence of former Wakefield Trinity treasurer Ernest Parker, who remembered that Trinity debuted their new (and now traditional) colours of blue and red on the same day and he was present at the match (He would have been approx. 10 years old). There is no mention of the ground move in the local newspapers and Parker's recollection was many years later.

D. W. Armitage writing in J. C. Lindley's "100 years of Rugby – the history of Wakefield Trinity 1873–1973" said "From minutes of the committee it is evident that by the time the club was about ten years old [this would have been around 1883] the field on which Trinity still play had been occupied and was looked upon as the permanent home."

In J. C. Lindley's "100 years of Rugby – the history of Wakefield Trinity 1873–1973" states "Their move to the arena which still forms their home did not come until late in 1892. In December of that year the club agreed to lease a field adjacent to the St Catherine's School and there they made their headquarters which have remained so throughout the rest of their history."

Lindley goes onto explain, "But that move of playing area, obviously caused by their inability to continue the lease on two grounds on which they had progressed, bought severe problems. Here was a "field" – an area of grass which needed fencing and developing, in direct contrast to their previous home, enclosed with two stands, on which athletics, cycling and lacrosse as well as rugby football, were given adequate facilities. In 1892 a completely fresh start had to be made, and until such developments, athletics (including the popular annual sports) had to be staged on Wakefield Cricket club's ground."

In 1892 newspaper reports that Trinity may "have to quit their present ground at Belle Vue at Belle Vue as it is required for building purposes." Delaney comments "Fortunately, the only development was the building of St Catherine's Road which stopped at the present turnstiles." This however may be incorrect and the reference to the "present ground" was actually a reference to the Elm Street ground and the redevelopment was a reference to the building of houses on Elm Street. Lindley explains that in January 1895 "some three years after taking the lease for this Belle Vue field", the club planned ground developments and to finance these, a Limited liability company "Wakefield Trinity Athletic Company Limited", controlled by but separate from the rugby club, was formed to both buy out the lease and raise finance to develop the ground. On 24 September 1898 Lord Milton, Wakefield's MP official opened the re-constituted ground, which now included a cycle track around the perimeter of the rugby field, with a game between Wakefield Trinity and Halifax.

=== Finals played at the ground ===
Belle Vue was the venue of the 1922–23 Challenge Cup final, in which Leeds beat Hull F.C. 28–3 in front of a crowd of 29,335, the only occasion that Belle Vue was the venue for the Challenge Cup final.

The 1937–38 Rugby Football League Championship Final was due to have taken place at Belle Vue, but as both finalists Hunslet and Leeds were from Leeds, the authorities switched the match to Elland Road.

=== 1960–1995 ===
Scenes from This Sporting Life were filmed at the Belle Vue Stadium during Wakefield Trinity's third round Challenge Cup match against Wigan in 1962. In 1967, floodlights were erected for the first time, allowing games to be held on an evening.

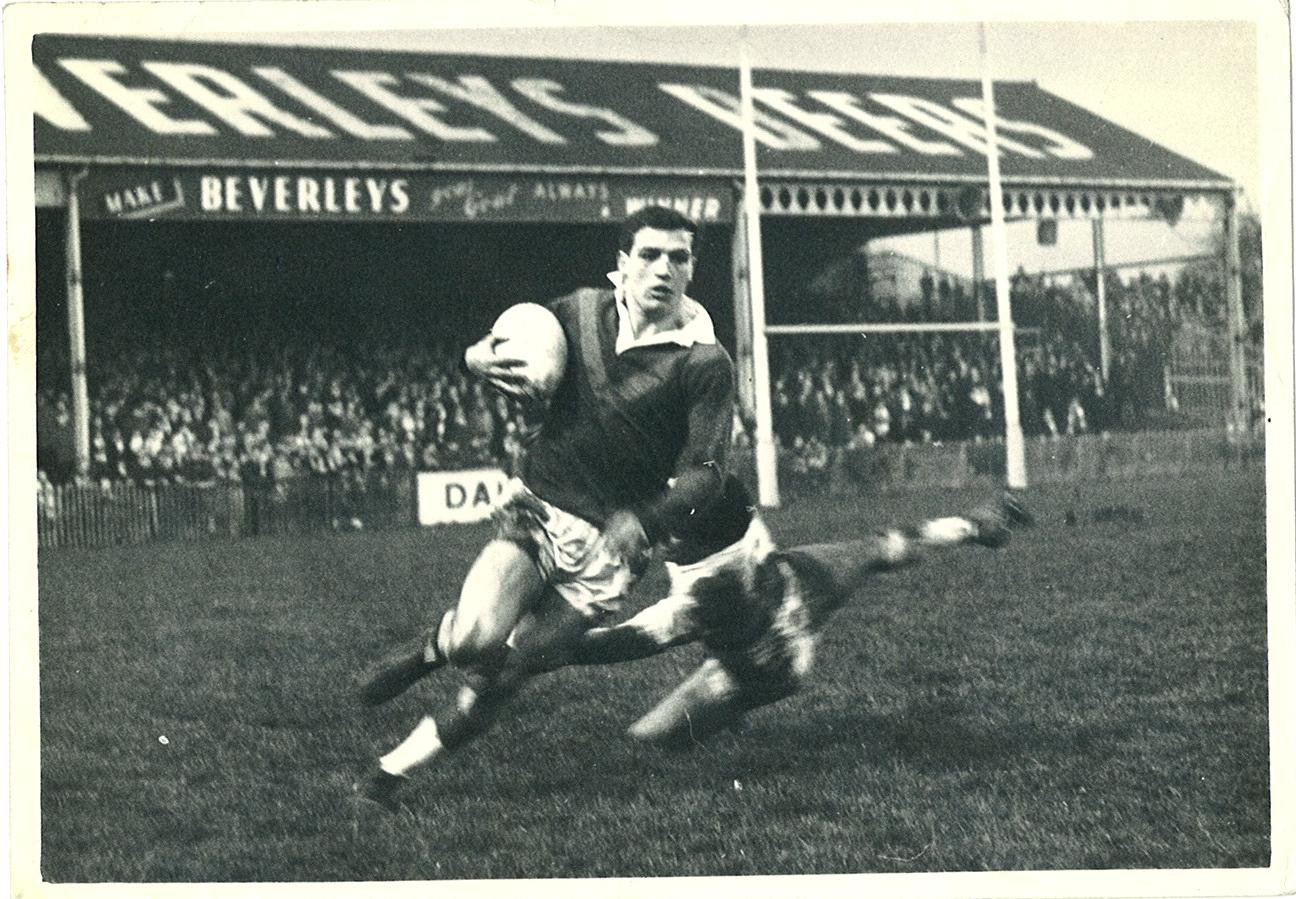
Michael Seatter on the field at Belle Vue in 1967

in 1986 the old wooden West Stand that had stood their since the construction of the ground in 1895 was demolished. It was however never fully replaced and now houses the TV gantry.

In 1992 the old floodlights that were installed in 1967 were upgraded. New changing rooms were also added for the 1984/85 season in the South-East corner of the ground

=== 1996–2009: Summer rugby ===
With Super League being founded in 1996, Wakefield Trinity, who then played in the Second Division, released plans for hospitality suites to be built at the South End of the ground to meet with Super League regulations. In the early 2000s a four-storey building was completed.

The capacity of the stadium was increased to 12,600 in 2008, to help with the application for a 2009 Super League licence, which was granted in July 2008. A roof was subsequently erected over the North Stand and a smaller roof was constructed in the South-West corner of the ground.

=== 2010–present: Redevelopment ===
Wakefield Trinity have long been in negotiation with the local council to find an alternative site, as the present Belle Vue stadium does not comply with the proposed standards required by the Super League. However, there have been difficulties in agreeing with the council on a suitable alternative site.

Originally plans for a 12,000 seater stadium in Stanley were unveiled on 17 April 2009, with the development proposed by Yorkcourt Properties and a community trust, chaired by former Rugby Football League chairman Sir Rodney Walker. However the club, community trust and Wakefield Council could never find enough money to start the project.

In 2016, Belle Vue was purchased on lease by the 88m Group, who planned to redevelop the stadium. The following year, plans were released for a new 12,000-capacity stadium to be built on the current site of Belle Vue, with the view for the stadium to be completed by 2020. However, this plan did not come to fruition, and a dispute emerged when Wakefield Trinity refused to agree to commercial rent rates imposed by Wakefield Council for the redevelopment. The club then threatened to take Wakefield Council to the High Court of Justice in November 2017 in order to compel Yorkcourt Properties to construct the Newmarket stadium as planned.

Belle Vue was sold by the 88m Group to Wakefield Trinity in 2019. A £3.15 million loan was granted to Wakefield Trinity by Wakefield Council in order to help the club purchase both Belle Vue and the site of a disused bowling alley, however it was found that this loan was double the market value of Belle Vue, and that no business plan had been agreed upon for operating the stadium after the completion of any stadium redevelopment. It was also found that if the club failed to repay the £3.15 million loan at 2.5% interest over 15 years, Wakefield Trinity must be willing to evict the club and sell the site for residential development.

Planning permission for the redevelopment of Belle Vue was granted in December 2021. Redevelopment commenced in July 2022 with the demolition of the East Stand, with a new 2,600-capacity seated stand featuring team changing rooms and a corporate hospitality restaurant, as well as a resurfaced car park, currently under construction, with plans to complete the rebuild in time for Wakefield Trinity's 150th anniversary in summer 2023. The terraced North Stand, having been limited to a standing capacity of 1,500 due to health and safety precautions, is also being refurbished to upgrade its standing capacity to 3,500.

Other redevelopments to Belle Vue, which are also planned for completion by summer 2023, include replacing the pitch with a hybrid surface, which was criticised in March 2023 for causing seven Catalans Dragons players to develop infections despite the pitch passing independent inspections, a permanent electronic scoreboard being erected in the north-west corner of the stadium and a set of new floodlights being installed.

== Layout ==
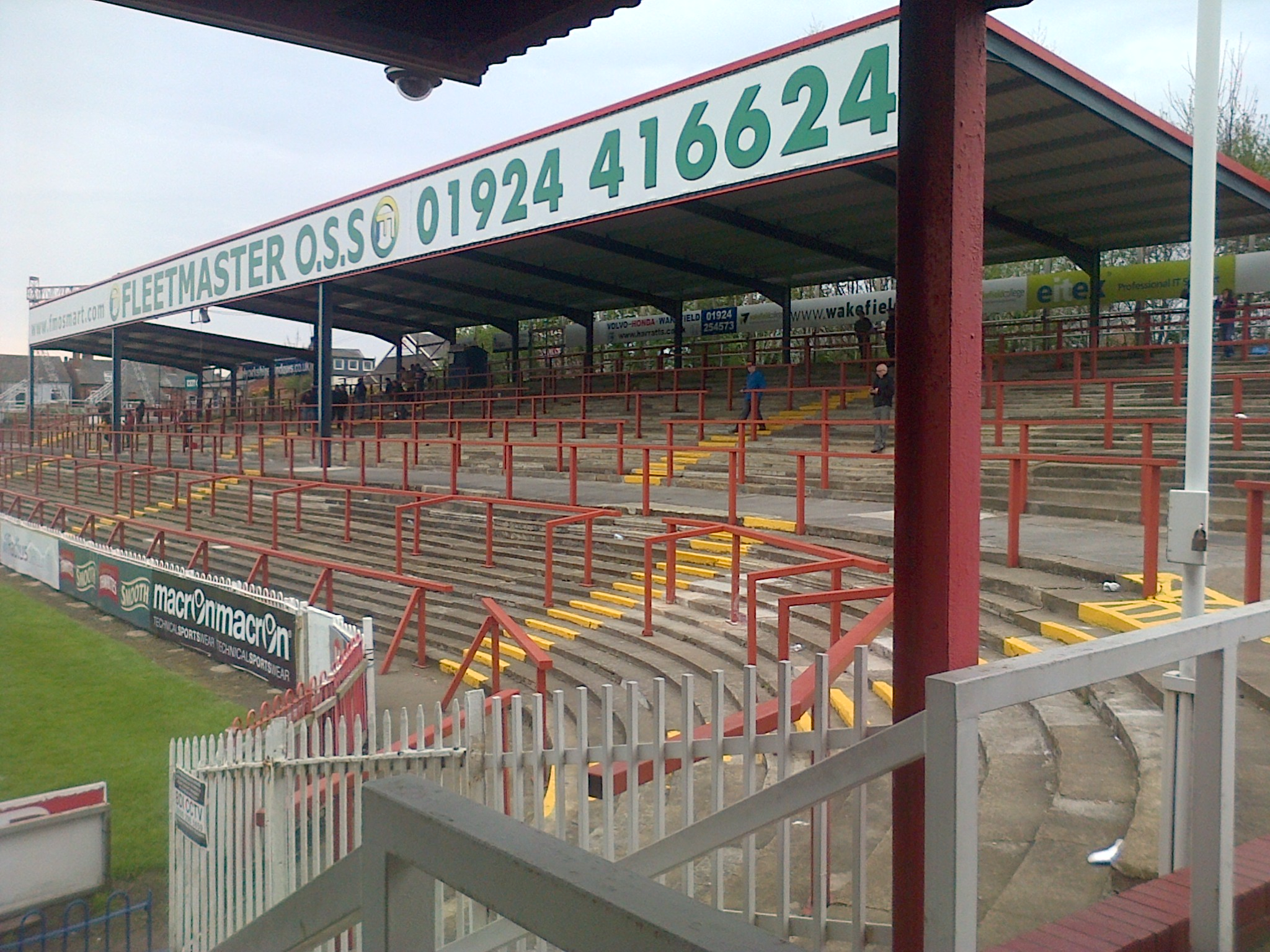

=== North Stand ===
Capacity: 2,500 (standing)
The North Stand is the kop end of the ground. It is terraced and has bars at the top of the stand and in the North-East corner. Originally uncovered a roof was erected in 2012 to meet minimum requirements for Super League. Following upgrades to the ground in 2023 the north stand 'Top Tier' was resurfaced and following promotion back to super league the bottom tier resurfaced with new safety barriers installed along with a new LED screen. Upgraded concessions were also added for fans.

=== Neil Fox MBE East Stand ===
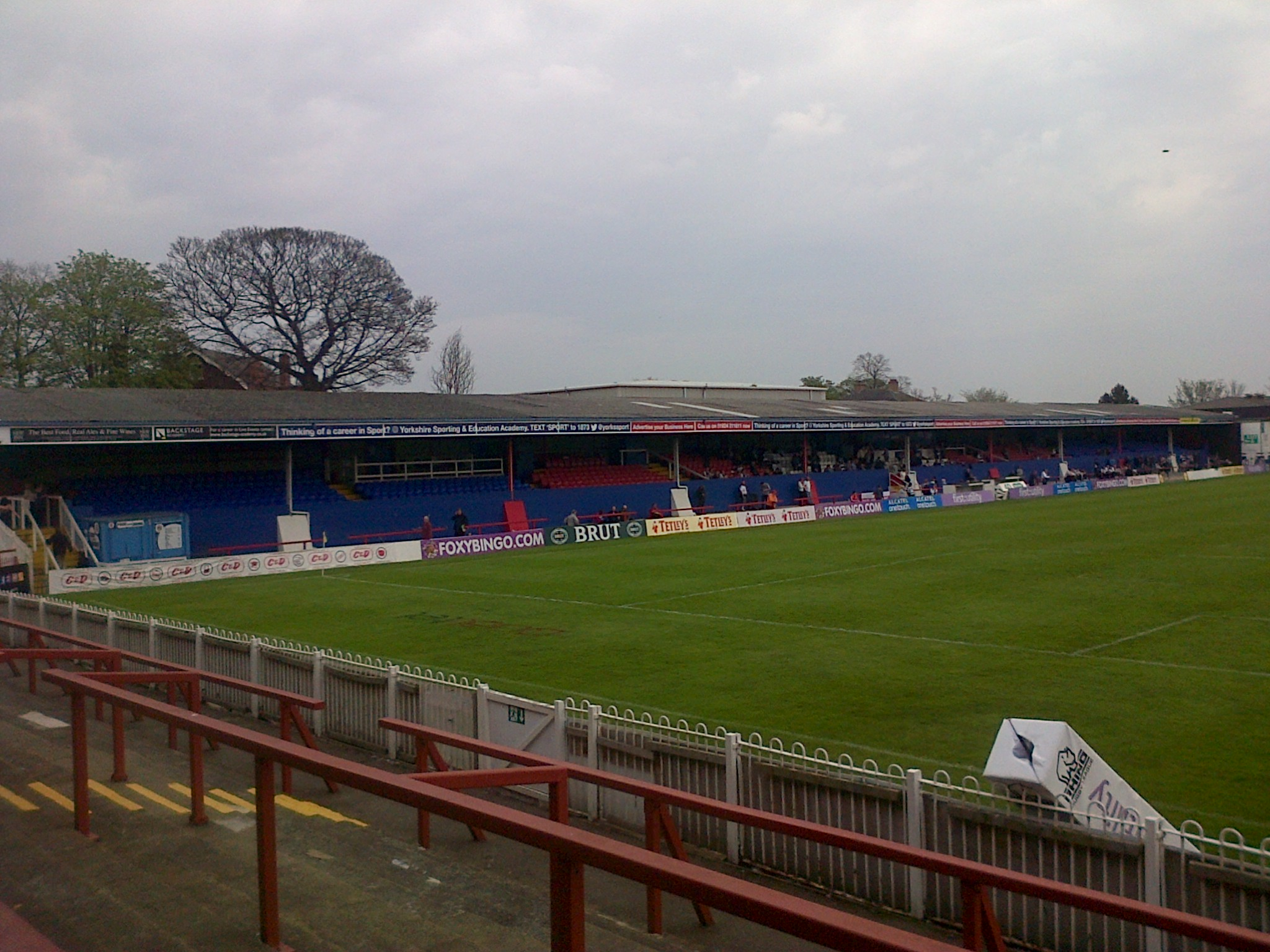

Capacity: 2,600 (seating)
The East stand is seen as the 'main' stand named after trinity's own rugby league record points holder. The stand was opened in 2024 and houses new changing rooms, hospitality and conference facilities.

=== Trinity Street End ===
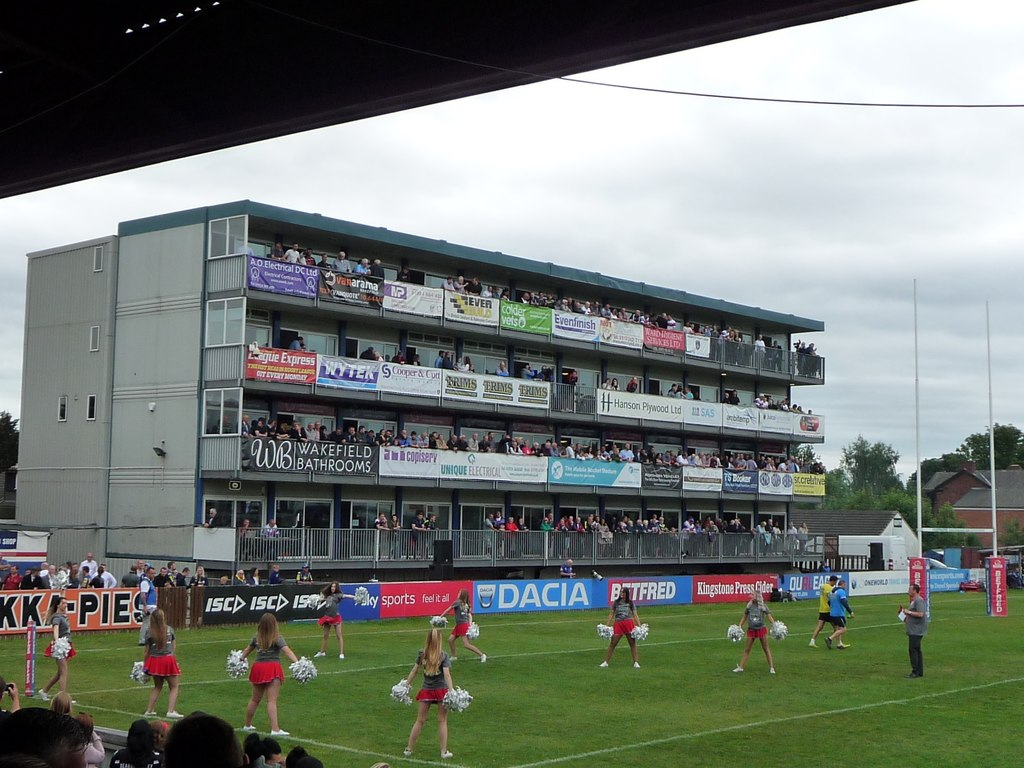

Capacity: ? (standing)
The Trinity Street End, locally known as the Benidorm Flats, is situated at the southern end of the ground. Originally it had been terracing but in the early 2000s Wakefield needed more and updated hospitality facilities so built a four-storey building similar to the South Bank at Bradford's Odsal Stadium. The South East corner houses a club shop and reception.

=== Arthur Street Side – Western Terrace ===
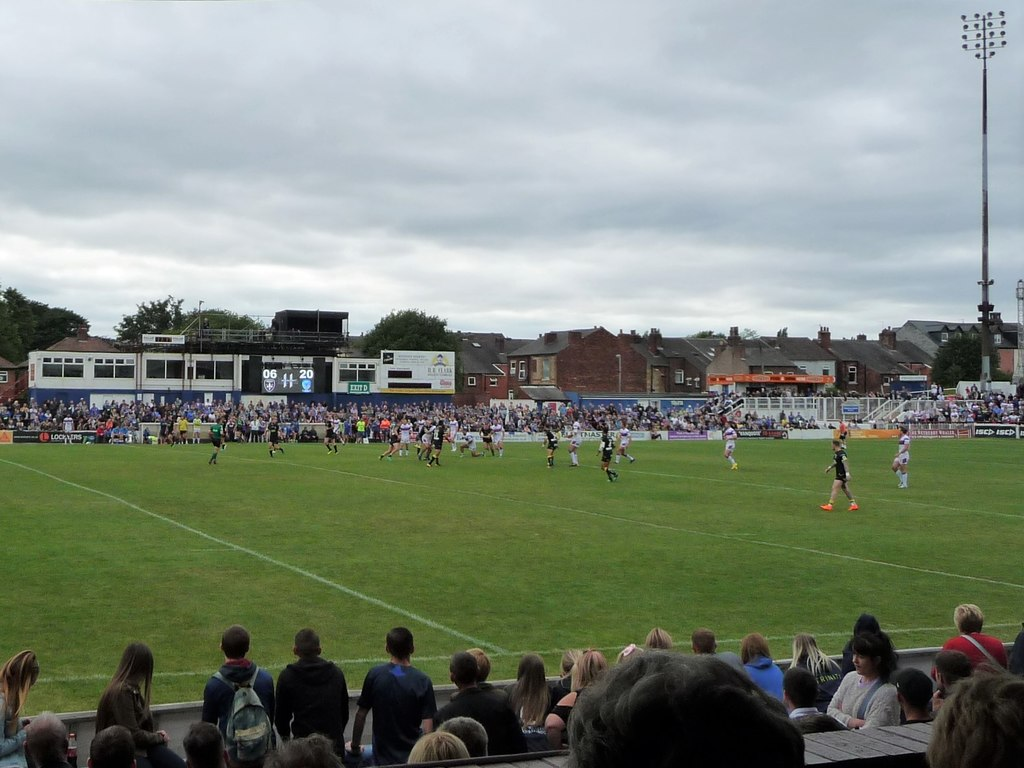
view out towards the Arthur Street side

Capacity: 2,500 (standing)
The west side of the ground, known as the Arthur Street side is mostly uncovered terracing. It houses the TV gantry . The stand mostly holds away fans and has a bar and big screen in the North-West corner. This is the designated stand for 'away fans' but also mixes in with home fans.

== Sponsors ==
Years	Sponsor	Name
2005	Atlantic Solutions	Atlantic Solutions Stadium
2009–2010	Hearwell	Hearwell Stadium
2011–2014	Rapid Solicitors	Rapid Solicitors Stadium
2017	Beaumont Legal	Beaumont Legal Stadium
2018–2021	Mobile Rocket	Mobile Rocket Stadium
2022–2023	Be Well Support	Be Well Support Stadium
2024–	DIY Kitchens	DIY Kitchens Stadium

== Usage ==
=== Rugby ===
The ground is primarily used for Rugby. It was originally a rugby union venue before the schism of 1895, although the occasional rugby union game has been played on the ground after 1895.

Belle Vue was the venue of the 1922–23 Challenge Cup final, in which Leeds beat Hull F.C. 28–3 in front of a crowd of 29,335, the only occasion that Belle Vue was the venue for the Challenge Cup final.

The 1937–38 Rugby Football League Championship Final was due to have taken place at Belle Vue, but as both finalists Hunslet and Leeds were from Leeds, the authorities switched the match to Elland Road.

On Saturday 16 September 2006 the stadium played host to the 'Battle of Belle Vue' when 11,000 fans from Wakefield Trinity and Castleford watched the match which would decide who was relegated from Super League. Wakefield Trinity won the match 29–17 sending their nearest rivals Castleford down to the National League.

Sheffield Eagles made Belle Vue their temporary home in 2017 after they were forced out of their home ground Don Valley Stadium two years earlier. The previous season they had played at Doncaster's Keepmoat Stadium.

On November 7, 2026, the ground hosted a Rugby Union international, Zimbabwe vs Samoa, as part of the November test series under the World Rugby Nations Cup (2nd tier tournament). The game was won by Samoa by 43-7.

=== Football ===
After Emley A.F.C. were relocated to Wakefield in 2000, they chose to play their home games at Belle Vue as it was the only sporting venue in the city big enough to accommodate them and the facilities were much better than their ground in Emley. The club's name changed three times after they moved to Wakefield, from Emley AFC to Wakefield & Emley FC to Wakefield-Emley and then just to Wakefield FC. They remained at Belle Vue until 2006 when they moved out to play at College Grove.

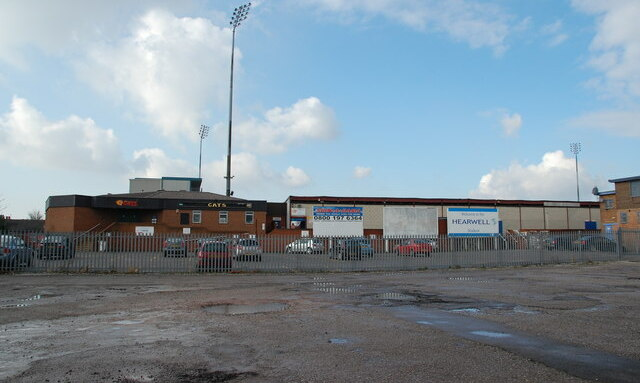
External view of Belle Vue in February 2010

After five years away the club returned to Belle Vue in 2012 but their return was short lived as they were wound up in 2014 after a move back to Emley failed and the club resigned from the Northern Counties League.

Leeds United reserves also played at the ground

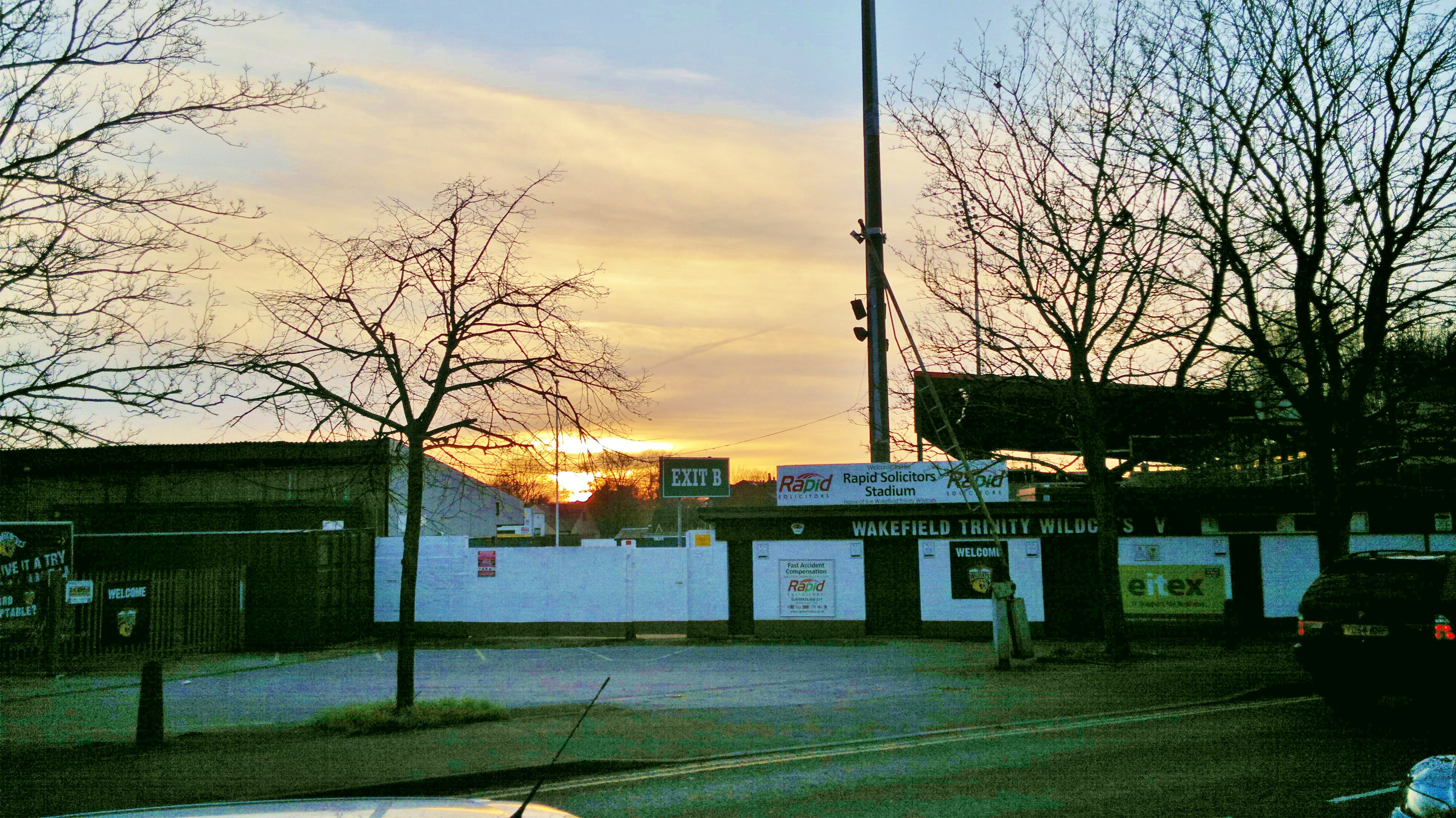
External view of Belle Vue in November 2012

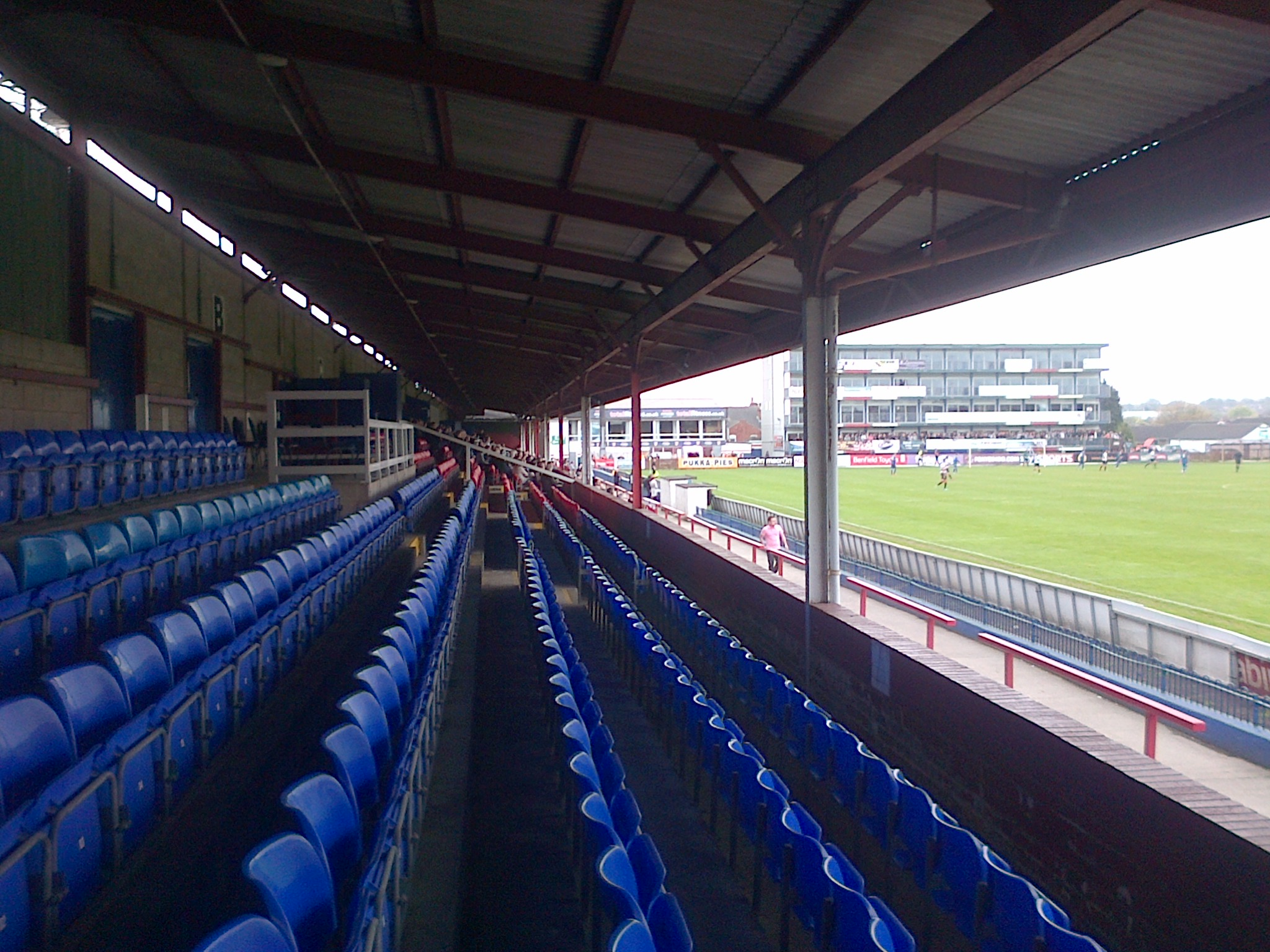
Belle Vue main stand looking southwards in April 2014

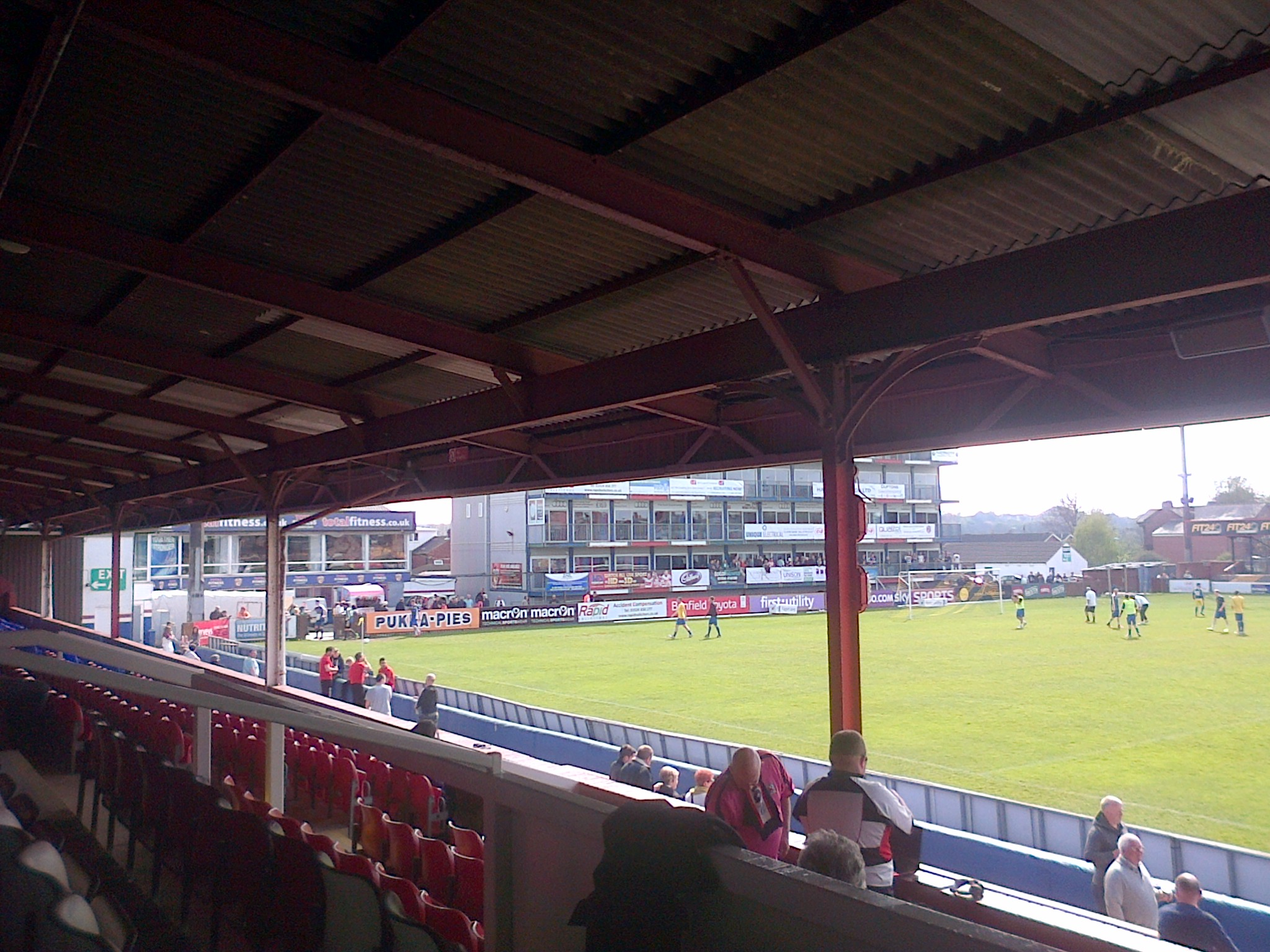
Belle Vue main stand looking to the south-west in April 2014

=== Other sports ===
After the redevelopment of the late 1890s the venue included a cycling track.

Lacrosse has also been played at the ground.

== International fixtures ==
=== Rugby League Test matches ===
The list of international rugby league matches played at Belle Vue is.

Date	Winner	Score	Runners up	Attendance
4 December 1909	England	19–13	Wales	4,000
21 October 2016	Wales	16–16	Jamaica	1,378

=== Rugby League Tour matches ===
In addition, Belle Vue has also played host to numerous Australian and New Zealand touring teams.

Date	Winner	Result	Runners up	Competition	Attendance
23 October 1907	Wakefield Trinity	5–5	New Zealand	1907–08 All Golds tour	5,000
18 December 1907	New Zealand	23–4	Yorkshire	1907–08 All Golds tour	
20 December 1908	Wakefield Trinity	20–13	Australia	1908–09 Kangaroo tour	3,000
18 November 1911	Australasia	24–10	Wakefield Trinity	1911–12 Kangaroo tour	5,000
22 October 1921	Australasia	29–3	Wakefield Trinity	1921–22 Kangaroo tour	6,000
7 December 1921	Australasia	24–8	Yorkshire	1921–22 Kangaroo tour	6,000
28 September 1929	Wakefield Trinity	14–3	Australia	1929–30 Kangaroo tour	9,786
20 November 1929	Australia	25–12	Yorkshire	1929–30 Kangaroo tour	7,011
28 October 1933	Australia	17–6	Wakefield Trinity	1933–34 Kangaroo tour	5,596
9 October 1937	Australia	17–10	Wakefield Trinity	1937–38 Kangaroo tour	8,696
25 September 1948	Australia	26–19	Wakefield Trinity	1948–49 Kangaroo tour	20,040
12 November 1952	Australia	58–8	Wakefield Trinity	1952–53 Kangaroo tour	7,239
10 December 1956	Wakefield Trinity	17–12	Australia	1956–57 Kangaroo tour	3,381
28 November 1959	Wakefield Trinity	20–10	Australia	1959–60 Kangaroo tour	17,615
26 October 1963	Australia	29–14	Wakefield Trinity	1963–64 Kangaroo tour	15,821
4 October 1967	Yorkshire	15–14	Australia	1967–68 Kangaroo tour	19,370
28 October 1967	Australia	33–7	Wakefield Trinity	1967–68 Kangaroo tour	10,056
3 October 1973	Australia	13–9	Wakefield Trinity	1973 Kangaroo tour	5,836
10 October 1990	Australia	36–18	Wakefield Trinity	1990 Kangaroo tour	7,724

== See also ==
- List of rugby league stadiums by capacity
