= Wheldon Road =

Rugby league stadium in Castleford, England

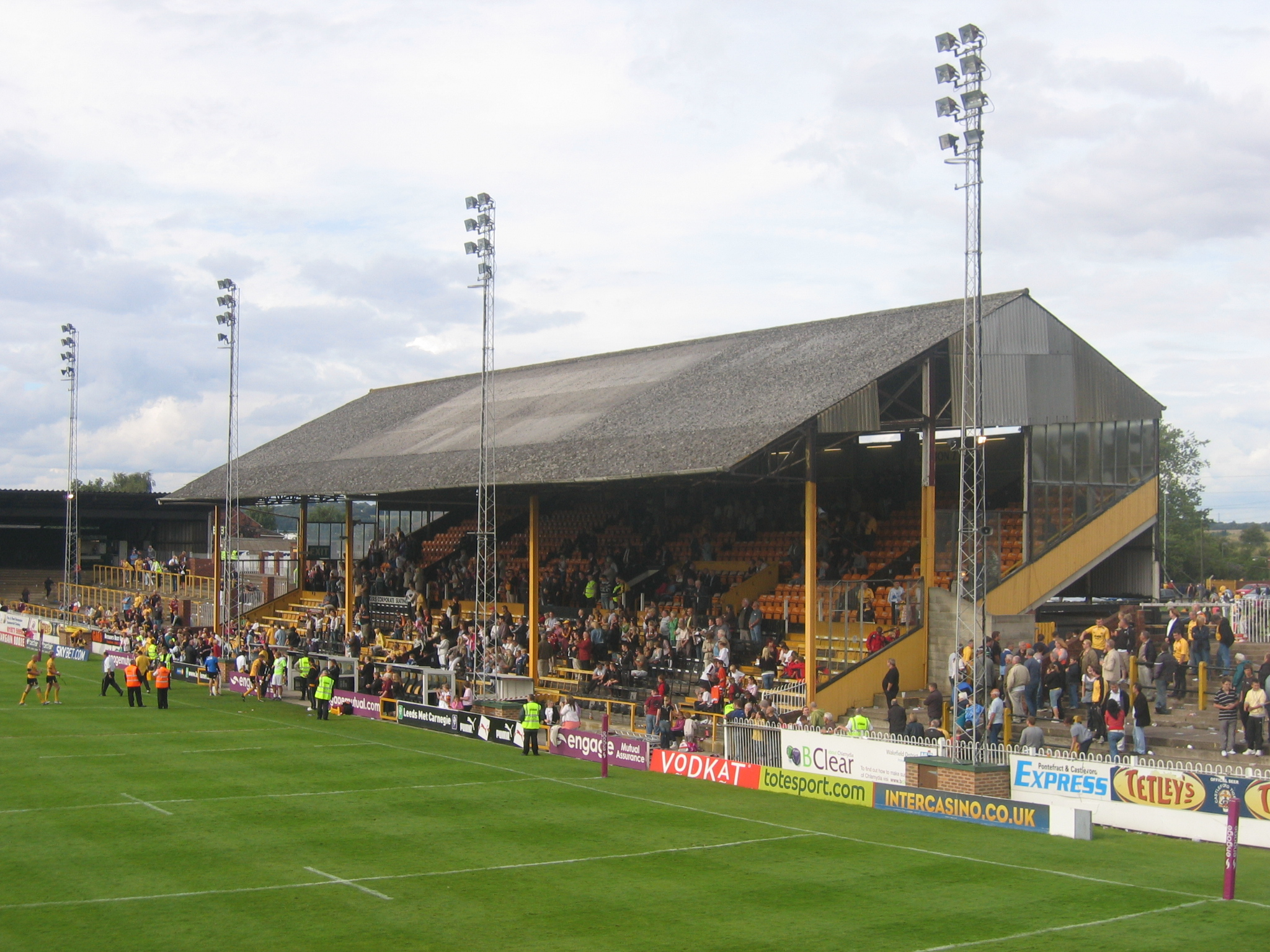
- Interactive map of Wheldon Road
- Full name: Wheldon Road
- Location: Wheldon Road, Castleford, West Yorkshire, England
- Coordinates: 53°43′47″N 1°20′27″W
- Owner: Castleford Tigers
- Operator: Castleford Tigers
- Capacity: 10,500
- Surface: Grass
- Scoreboard: Philips Vidiwall
- Record attendance: 25,449 (Castleford vs Hunslet, 9 March 1935)
- Field size: 120 by 74 yards (110 m × 68 m)
- Public transit: Castleford

Construction
- Built: 1926
- Opened: 1926

Tenants
- Castleford Town F.C. (1926–1936); Castleford Tigers (1927–present)

Wheldon Road (known as the OneBore Stadium for sponsorship purposes) is the home ground of Castleford Tigers rugby league club in Castleford, West Yorkshire, England. It is on Wheldon Road, just outside Castleford town centre. The record attendance of 25,449 was for a Challenge Cup match in 1935.

== History ==
Wheldon Road officially opened in 1926 and was the home of association football club Castleford Town F.C. The following year Castleford RLFC moved in after the completion of their first season (1926–27) after playing at 'Sandy Desert', which has since been redeveloped, and is the home of Castleford Lock Lane.

On 9 March 1935, the ground set its record attendance of 25,449 for a third-round Challenge Cup match against Hunslet.

Floodlights were installed for the 1965–66 season.

On 7 March 2004, Wheldon Road recorded its highest attendance of the Super League era with 11,731 against the Leeds Rhinos.

In 2011, Castleford Tigers signed a deal with developers who intended to redevelop the ground as a supermarket. This deal would fund a new £12 million stadium at nearby Glasshoughton for which the club had received planning consent. In October 2012 the plans were scrapped due to lack of funding. In 2014, it was announced that the club would be moving to a new stadium near Glasshoughton along with a new retail park on the same site.

From the 2023 season, the stadium's maximum capacity was slightly reduced to 10,500 after taking on board fan feedback.

== Layout ==
=== North Stand ===
The Wheldon Road End is a covered standing terrace and is considered the Kop end of the ground as it is particularly used by Castleford supporters.

=== East Stand ===
The Main Stand in the east end of the ground houses 1,500 seats and the changing rooms and tunnel. About two thirds of the stand is uncovered terracing each side of the Main Stand. The clubs pavilion is situated at this side of the ground. Most of the bars and food outlets are at this side of the ground inside the marquee.

=== South Stand ===
The Railway End is at the south of the ground. It is an uncovered standing terrace, with a supporters' club, executive boxes and a scoreboard along its top. It is mainly used by away supporters.

=== West Stand ===
The Princess Street Stand is at the west of the ground. It is almost identical to the Wheldon Road End, though is fully seated as of 2024. It is completely covered and houses the TV and commentary gantry.

== Sponsors ==
The stadium was renamed the Jungle from 2000 to 2010, initially due to sponsorship from online retailer Jungle.com. In 2010 PROBIZ became the stadium's sponsors after signing a three-year deal. Wish Communications became sponsors for the 2013 season before Mend-a-Hose became sponsors in 2014.

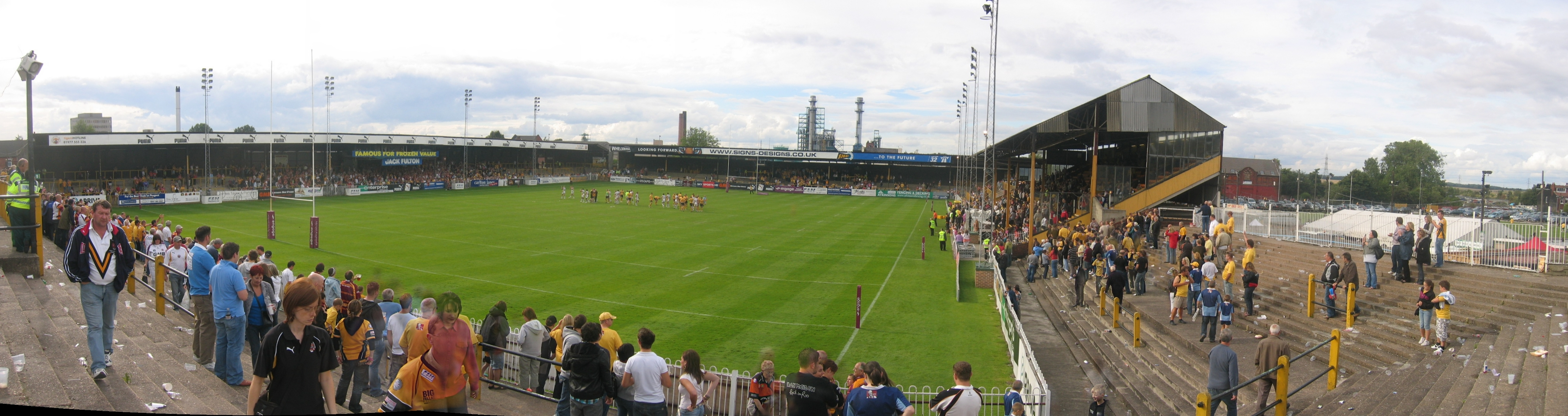
Panorama of Wheldon Road in 2008

Year	Sponsor	Name
2000–2001	Jungle.com	The Jungle
2010–2012	PROBIZ	PROBIZ Colliseum
2013	Wish Communications	Wish Communications Stadium
2014–2024	Mend-A-Hose	The Mend-A-Hose Jungle
2025–	OneBore	The OneBore Stadium

== International matches ==
=== Rugby league test matches ===
List of international rugby league matches played at Wheldon Road:

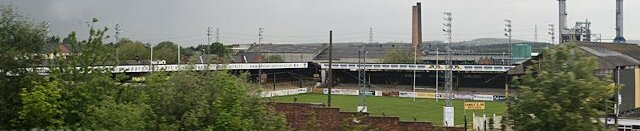
View into Wheldon Road in 2014

Date	Winners	Score	Runners up	Competition	Attendance
28 October 1970	Great Britain	6–0	France	1970 World Cup	8,958
16 October 1971	New Zealand	17–14	Great Britain	1971 New Zealand Tour	4,108
20 October 1995	Cook Islands	21–10	Scotland	1995 Emerging Nations Tournament	2,889
12 November 2000	New Zealand	54–6	France	2000 World Cup	5,158

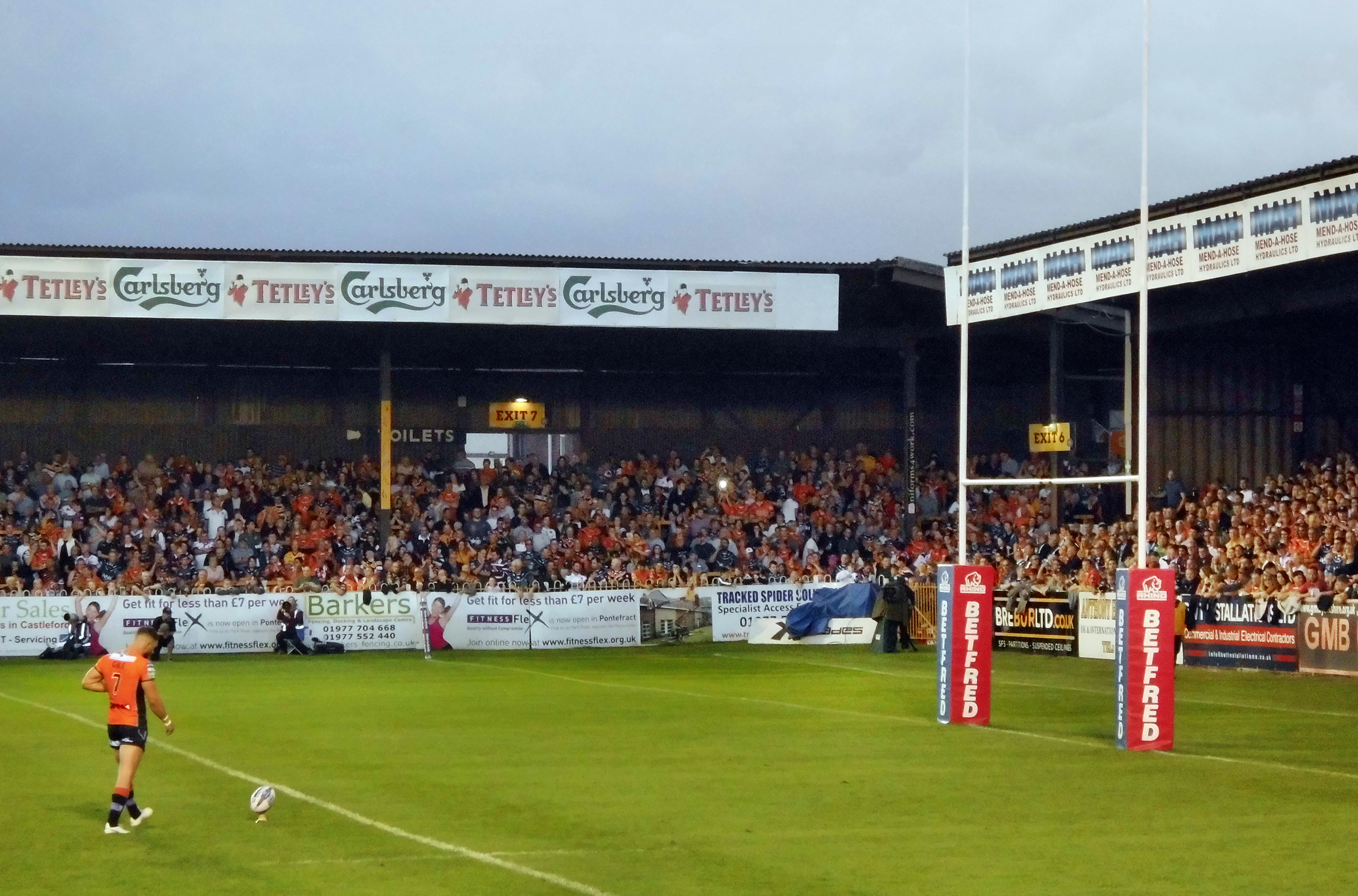
Luke Gale preparing to kick at goal in front of the Cas faithful at Wheldon Road in 2017

=== Rugby league tour matches ===
Other than Castleford club games, Wheldon Road also saw Cas play host to various international touring teams from 1929 to 1994.

Date	Winners	Score	Runners up	Competition	Attendance
9 October 1929	Australia	53–2	Castleford	1929–30 Kangaroo Tour	4,000
27 September 1933	Australia	39–6	Castleford	1933–34 Kangaroo Tour	4,259
6 October 1948	Australia	10–8	Castleford	1948–49 Kangaroo Tour	14,004
13 November 1963	Castleford	13–12	Australia	1963–64 Kangaroo Tour	7,887
9 November 1967	Castleford	22–3	Australia	1967–68 Kangaroo Tour	6,137
10 October 1973	Australia	18–0	Castleford	1973 Kangaroo Tour	2,419
3 October 1989	New Zealand	22–20	Castleford	1989 New Zealand Tour	
4 November 1990	Australia	28–8	Castleford	1990 Kangaroo Tour	9,033
12 October 1994	Australia	38–12	Castleford	1994 Kangaroo Tour	11,073

== Gallery ==
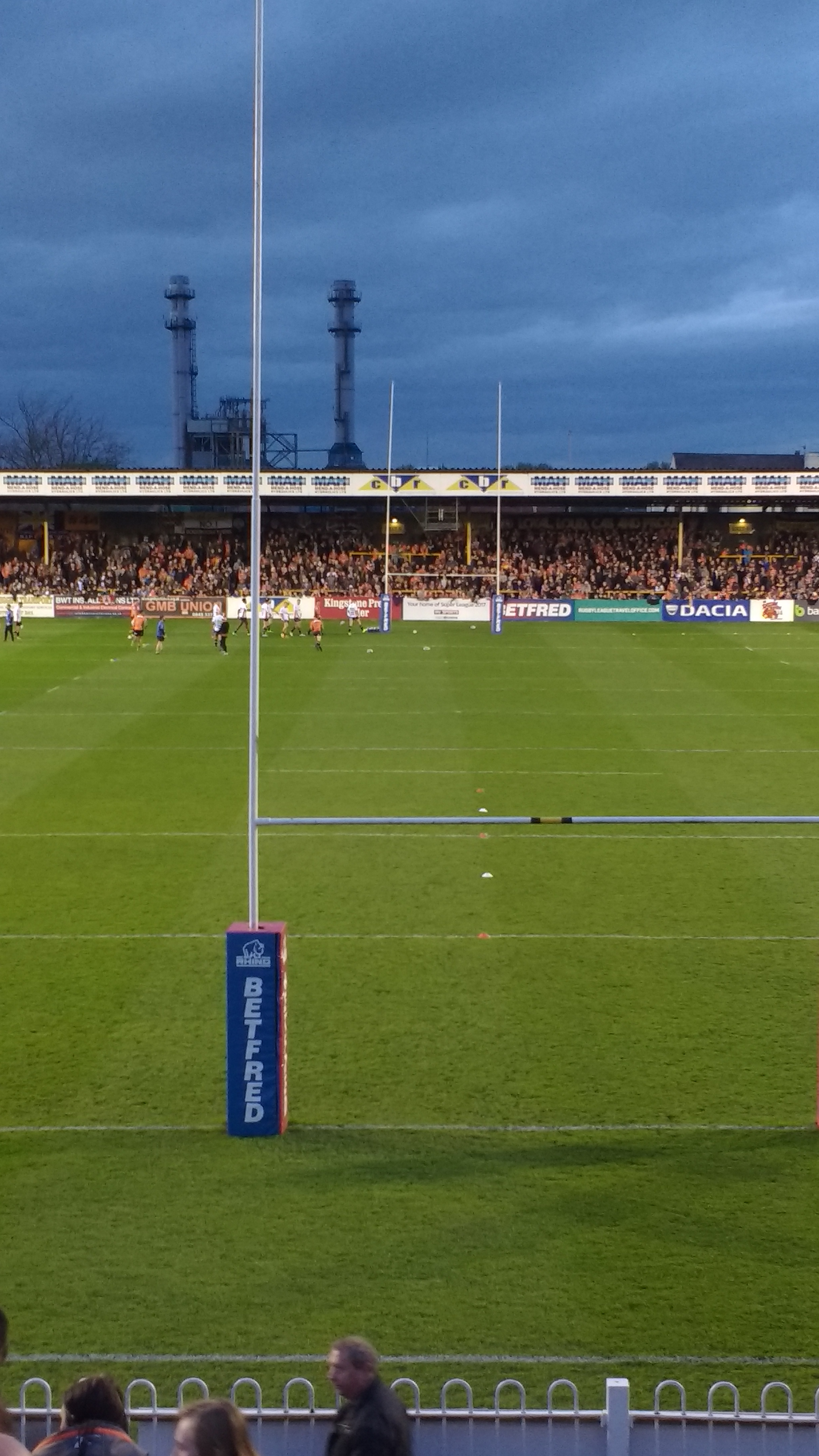
View of the Wheldon Road end from the Railway End

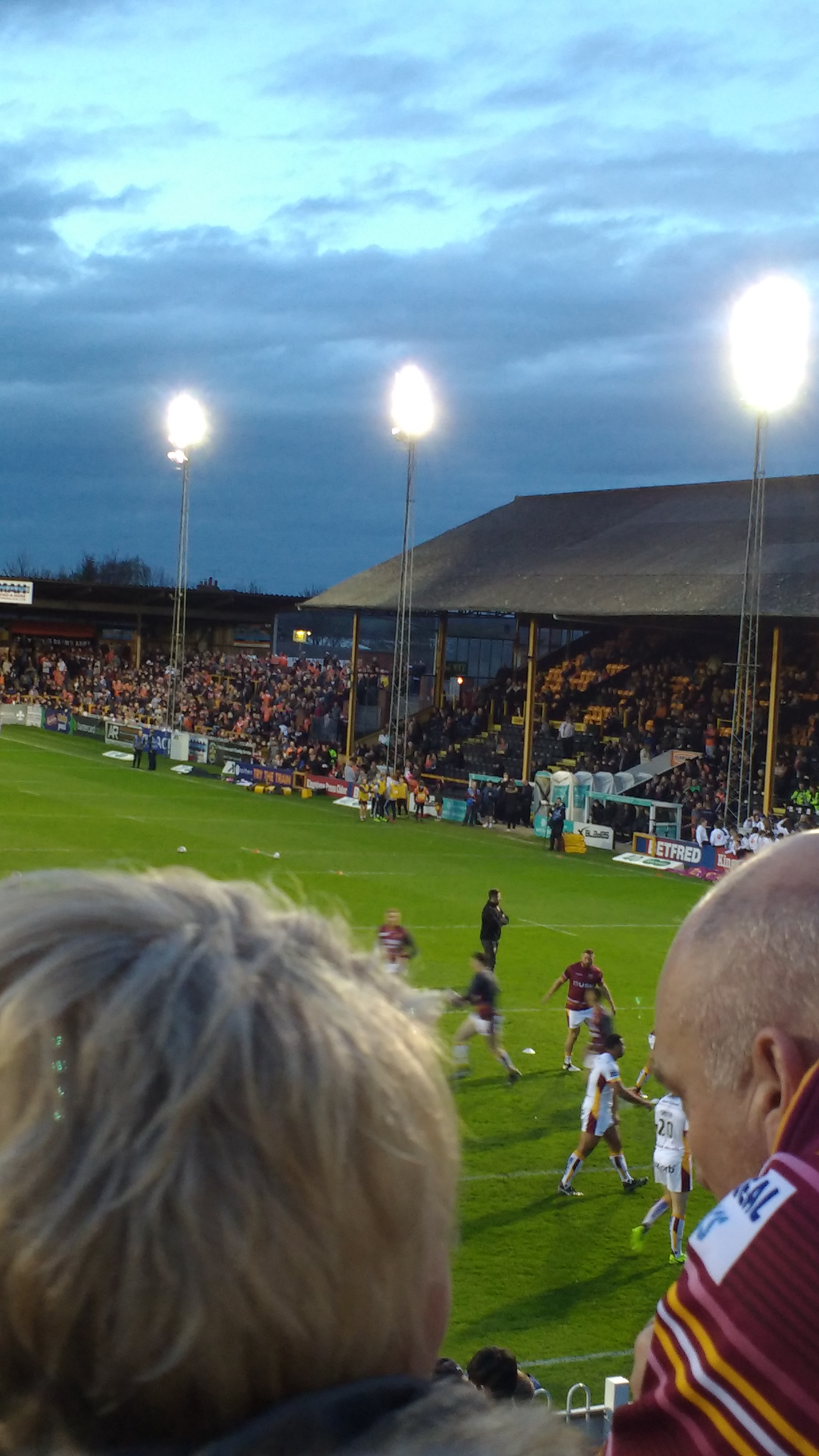
Main Stand side

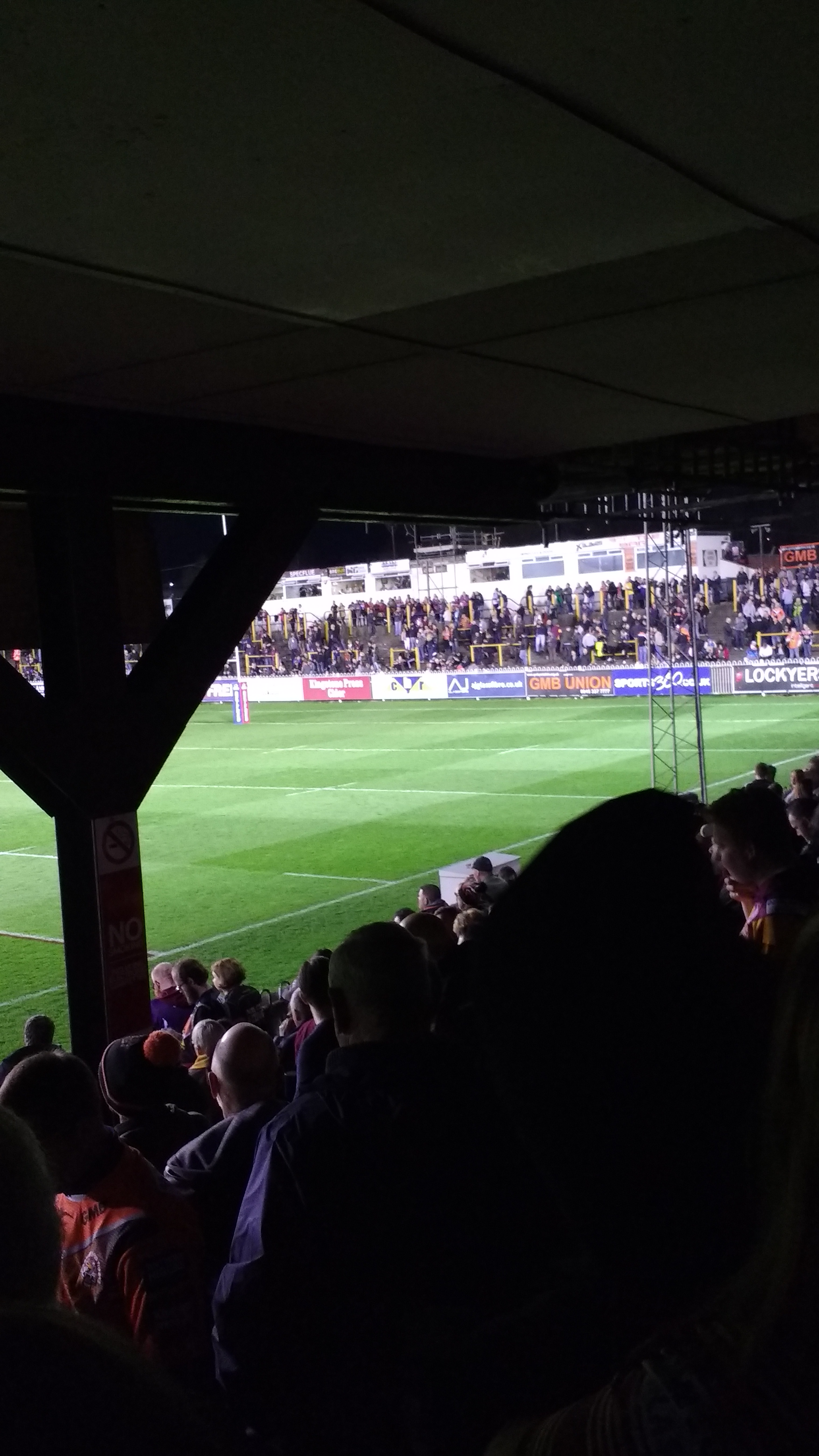
View of the Railway End from Princess Street Terrace

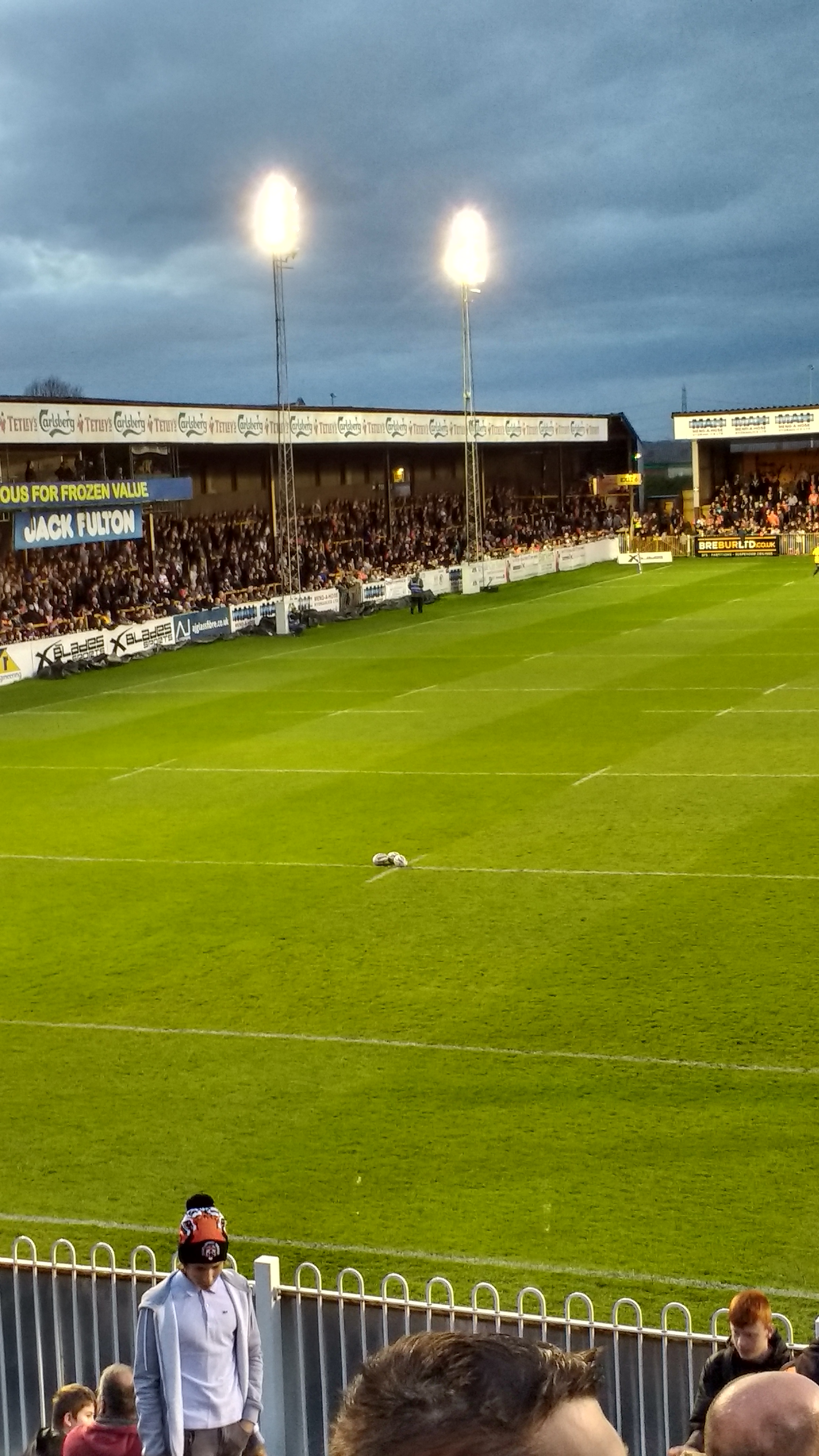
Princess Street terrace
