= Glasshoughton =

Suburb of Castleford, West Yorkshire, England

Coordinates: 53.713931°N 1.341638°W

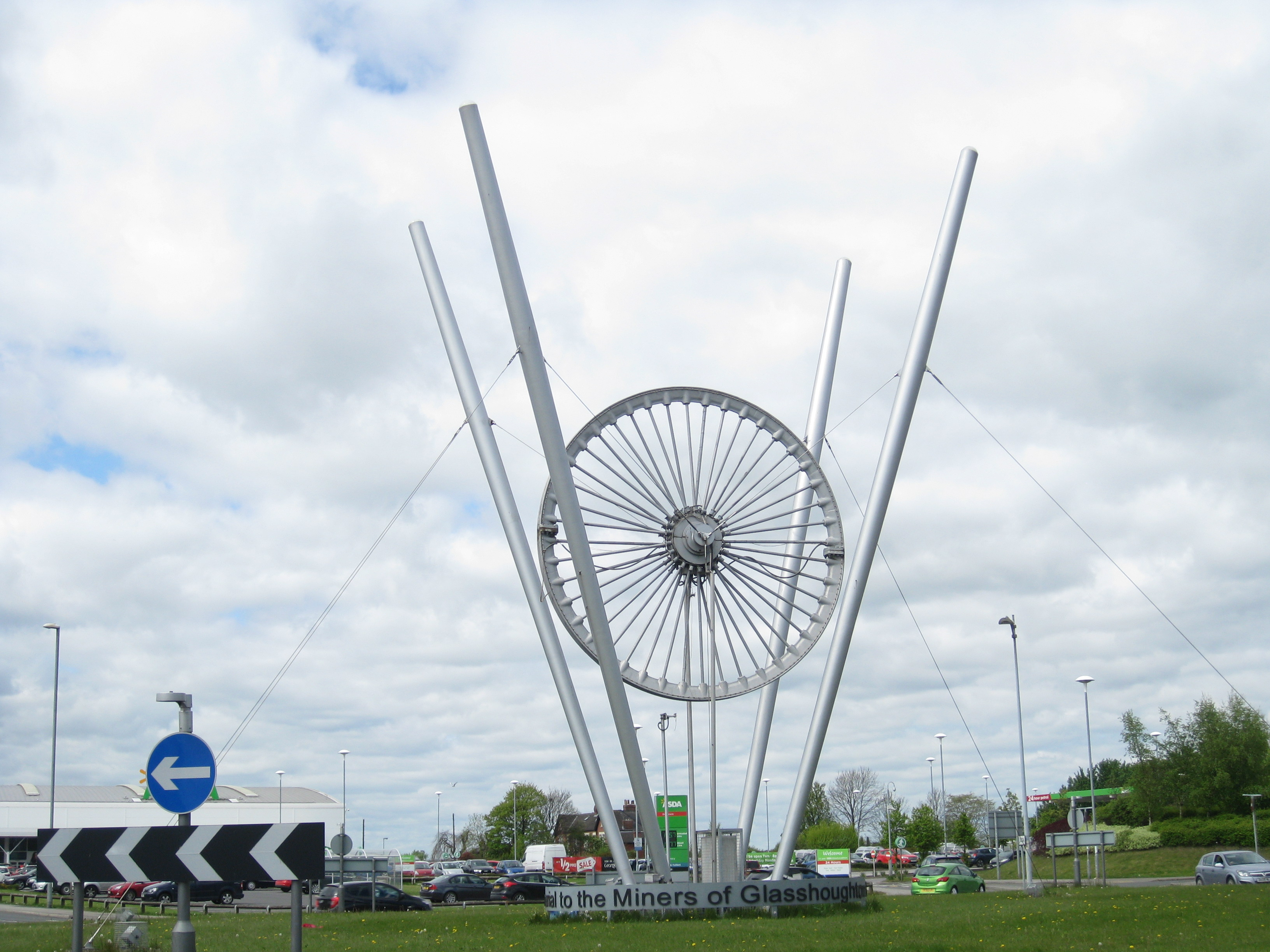
- Glasshoughton Wheel of Light

- Location within West Yorkshire
- Metropolitan borough: City of Wakefield
- Metropolitan county: West Yorkshire
- Region: Yorkshire and the Humber
- Country: England
- Sovereign state: United Kingdom
- Post town: CASTLEFORD
- Postcode district: WF10
- Dialling code: 01977
- Police: West Yorkshire
- Fire: West Yorkshire
- Ambulance: Yorkshire
- UK Parliament: Normanton, Pontefract and Castleford

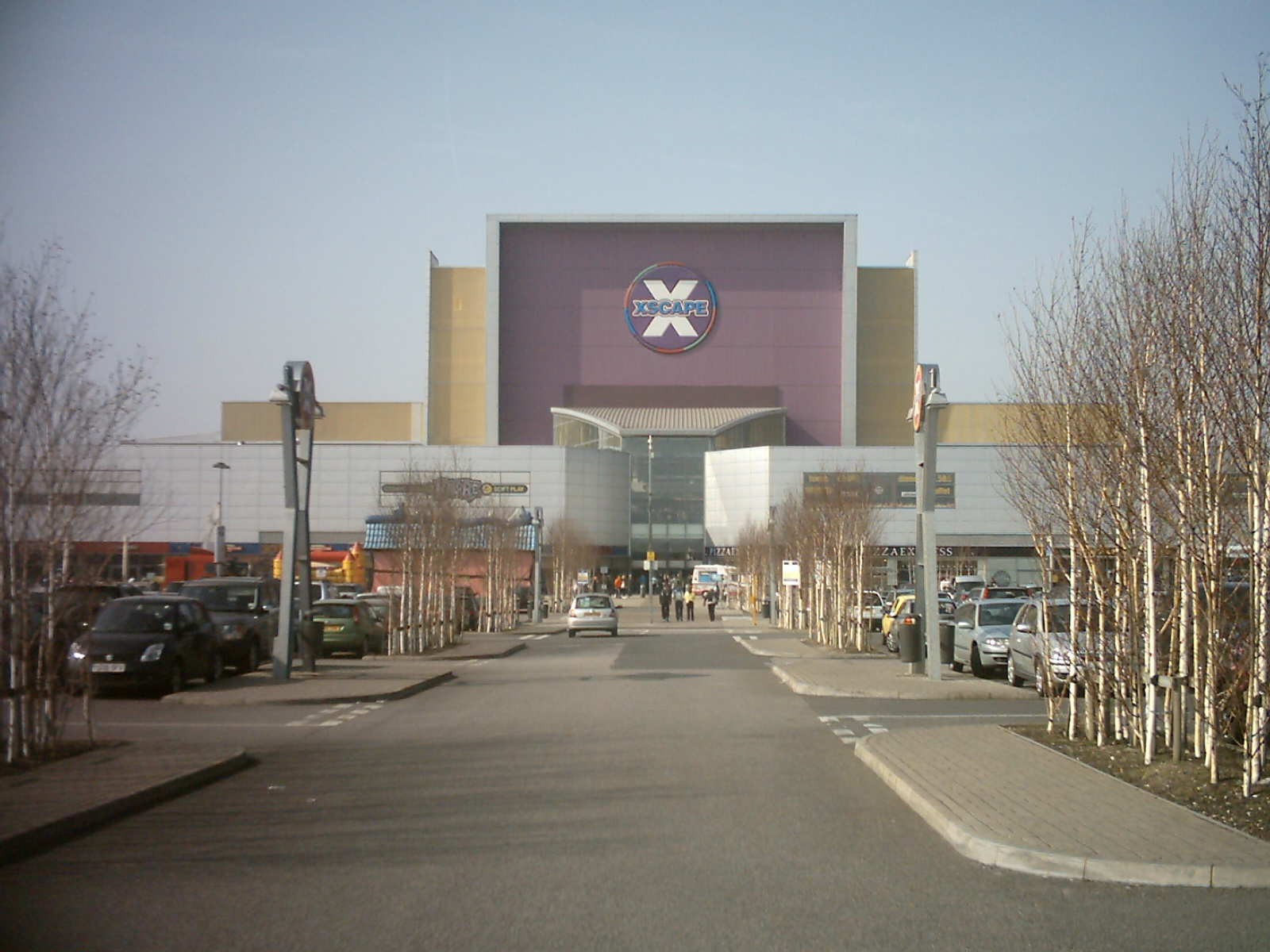
Xscape

Glasshoughton is a neighbourhood of Castleford in the Wakefield district of West Yorkshire, England. The area is next to Junction 32 of the M62 motorway and the Glasshoughton railway station, and borders Pontefract.

Glasshoughton is home to the Xscape leisure centre and ski slope, the Junction 32 Outlet Shopping Village, a B&Q, a hotel, several pubs and a number of fast food restaurants, which were built on the site of the former Glasshoughton Colliery and coke coking plant. This area also contains the Glasshoughton Wheel of Light, a former pit winding wheel now made into a sculpture as a memorial to the miners of Glasshoughton. The local football team is Glasshoughton Welfare F.C., for whom former Liverpool F.C. goalkeeper, Bruce Grobbelaar made one fund-raising appearance in 2007.

For elections to Wakefield Council, it is in the Castleford Central and Glasshoughton electoral ward.

== History ==
For most of the nineteenth century Glasshoughton was a separate village with an economic, social and religious life of its own. It had glassworks before Castleford and it supplied most of the coal for Castleford's industries until the big, modern pits opened at Wheldale, Fryston and Glasshoughton itself from the late 1860s. There was a Wesleyan chapel in the village from not much later than 1837, this being the year a plot of land on what is now School Lane was sold for "a Methodist Chapel and Sunday School". In the 1851 census the village name was sometimes spelled Glashouton. In the 1870s, the locale was well known as Houghton-Glass for its mines and quarries, producing excellent limestone and excellent sand used by glassmakers and iron foundries. The 1890 Ordnance Survey map shows Glass Houghton as a village distinct from Castleford, with its largest buildings along each side of Front Street. The population growth of Castleford to the southwest of the old village centre naturally has been referred to as Glasshoughton.

Houghton-Glass was formerly a township in the parish of Castleford, in 1866 Glass Houghton became a separate civil parish, on 1 April 1938 the parish was abolished and merged with Castleford. In 1931 the parish had a population of 8602.

== Education ==
Glasshoughton is home to the Castleford Campus of Wakefield College, now known as Castleford College.

== Transport ==
Glasshoughton railway station on the Pontefract Line opened in 2005 to serve the newly built leisure and retail facilities. The station has 100 car spaces accessed by bridge over the track, and encourages park/walk and ride commuting to reduce road congestion.
