= 2010 RFL Championship =

- Championship logo
- League: RFL Championship
- Duration: 22 Rounds (Followed by 4 round playoffs)
- Teams: 11
- Highest attendance: 3,686; Widnes vs. Halifax (18 Mar)
- Lowest attendance: 835; Sheffield vs. Dewsbury (19 Mar)
- Average attendance: 1,771 ▲
- Total attendance: 53,130 ▲
- Broadcast partners: Sky Sports

2010 Season
- Halifax
- Featherstone Rovers
- Runners-up: Halifax

Promotion and relegation
- Relegated to Championship 1: Whitehaven; Keighley Cougars

The 2010 Rugby Football League Championship is known as Co-operative Championship due to sponsorship by The Co-operative Group.

The 2010 Co-operative Championship is a semi-professional rugby league football competition played in the United Kingdom and France one tier below the first tier Super League. The two worst performing teams during the season, with the exception of Toulouse Olympique, will be relegated to Championship 1.

There is no automatic promotion from this league to Super League, which uses a licensing system renewed every three years. Qualifying for the grand final or winning the Northern Rail Cup is a prerequisite for Championship clubs to be able to apply for license in the next round of applications for the 2012–14 period.

All of the teams in the 2010 Co-operative Championship will also compete in the 2010 Challenge Cup where they will enter in the third round. All of the teams, with the exception of Toulouse Olympique will compete in the 2010 Northern Rail Cup which starts before the Co-operative Championship with the finals held mid season.

Featherstone Rovers finished the league in first place after the regular season but were beaten by Halifax in the grand final 23-22

== Teams ==
This competition features mostly the same teams as it did in 2009. The Dewsbury Rams and Keighley Cougars were promoted from the 2009 Championship One. The Leigh Centurions and Doncaster were meant to be relegated. However, the chairman of Gateshead Thunder wound up the club and they were reformed by the community. This breach of insolvency laws caused them to be relegated and allowed Leigh to stay in the Co-operative Championship.

Legend
| Reigning champions |
| Defending Northern Rail Cup Champions |

| Team & Current Season | Stadium | Capacity | Location |
|---|---|---|---|
| Barrow Raiders | Craven Park | 7,600 | Barrow-in-Furness, Cumbria |
| Batley Bulldogs | Mount Pleasant | 6,000 | Batley, West Yorkshire |
| Dewsbury Rams | Tetley's Stadium | 3,500 | Dewsbury, West Yorkshire |
| Featherstone Rovers | Bigfellas Stadium | 6,750 | Featherstone, West Yorkshire |
| Halifax | The Shay Stadium | 6,561 | Halifax, West Yorkshire |
| Keighley Cougars RLFC | Cougar Park | 6,800 | Keighley, West Yorkshire |
| Leigh Centurions | Leigh Sports Village | 12,700 | Leigh, Greater Manchester |
| Sheffield Eagles | Bramall Lane | 32,702 | Sheffield, South Yorkshire |
| Toulouse Olympique XIII (2010 Toulouse Olympique season) | Stade des Minimes | 4,066 | Toulouse, Midi-Pyrénées, France |
| Whitehaven | Recreation Ground | 7,500 | Whitehaven, Cumbria |
| Widnes Vikings (2010 Widnes Vikings season) | Stobart Stadium Halton | 13,500 | Widnes, Cheshire |

== Rule changes ==
=== Player safety in tackle ===
The RFL announced two new rule interpretations intended to increase player safety in the tackle:

- Referees will now call "held" if one of the ball-carrier's legs is lifted by a defender in a tackle in which the participants are stood upright. Previously, a referee would only declare the tackle complete if both legs had been lifted.
- Referees will now call held as soon as they see the ball carrier being dragged by more than one defender. This will prevent groups of defenders dragging an opponent into touch or the in-goal area.

=== Salary cap ===
- The salary cap for the 2010 Co-Operative Championship has been reduced from £400,000 to £300,000

== Fair Play Index ==
The Fair Play Index was launched in 2007 as part of The RFL's new Official partnership with Frontline Bathrooms. The Fair Play Index (known as the Frontline Fair Play Index through sponsorship) will be putting standards of discipline under the spotlight throughout the 2010 Co-operative Championship campaign.

At the end of the regular season the teams that finish top of the Frontline Fair Play Index will be presented with a specially engraved trophy and £5,000 prize from Frontline Bathrooms.

=== 2010 Fair Play Index ===
2010 Frontline Fair Play Index
| # | Team | Pen | Sin | Off | Ban | Pts |
|---|---|---|---|---|---|---|
| 1 | Widnes | 45 | 0 | 0 | 0 | 45 |
| 2 | Leigh Centurions | 46 | 0 | 0 | 0 | 46 |
| 3 | Sheffield Eagles | 44 | 2 | 0 | 0 | 50 |
| 4 | Keighley Cougars | 53 | 0 | 0 | 0 | 53 |
| 4 | Featherstone Rovers | 50 | 1 | 0 | 0 | 53 |
| 6 | Whitehaven | 57 | 0 | 1 | 0 | 61 |
| 7 | Batley Bulldogs | 61 | 1 | 0 | 0 | 65 |
| 7 | Halifax | 59 | 2 | 0 | 0 | 65 |
| 7 | Dewsbury Rams | 62 | 1 | 0 | 0 | 65 |
| 10 | Toulouse Olympique | 66 | 0 | 0 | 1 | 71 |
| 11 | Barrow Raiders | 61 | 1 | 0 | 4 | 84 |

Source:"2010 Co-Operative Championship Fairplay Index". The RFL. Archived from the original on 4 April 2010. Note: Stats are correct as of Round 7 of the Co-Operative Championship on 16 April 2010.

== Disciplinary record ==
The following table lists all incidents that were reviewed by the Rugby Football League during 2010 Co-Operative Championship, which were later deemed guilty and resulted in disciplinary action. The offenses were graded, depending on severity, in alphabetical order, "A" being less severe than "B".

| Disc date | Name of player | Grade | Offense | Suspension | Fine | Source |
|---|---|---|---|---|---|---|
| 23 March 2010 | Gareth Haggerty | C | Use of forearm on player not in possession of the ball in 56th minute (Barlow). | 4 matches | £50 | Report |
| 31 March 2010 | Brendan Worth | B | Head butting in 20th minute. | 1 match | £50 | Report |

== Notable moments ==
December 2009

- 18 Dec - Keighley Cougars (Cougars (2001) Ltd) appeared in court in Leeds after an unpaid tax bill of £183,000 forced them into administration. However, the club was saved from being wound up after local businessmen sealed a deal to purchase the club and restart under the name of Keighley Cougars (2010) Ltd.

February 2010

- 18 Feb - Coronation Street actresses Michelle Keegan, Helen Flanagan and Lucy-Jo Hudson, joined a host of current players in the Manchester Evening News Arena to officially launch the 2010 Co-Operative Championship.
- 20 Feb - Keighley Cougars will start the 2010 season on minus nine points after being deducted nine points by the RFL for going into administration.
- 28 Feb - Widnes Vikings recorded the biggest win of the season so far after defeating Keighley Cougars 72-10 at the Stobart Stadium Halton.

March 2010

- 15 Mar - All Co-Operative championship clubs agree to a special Easter Bank Holiday weekend family ticket that gives matchday admission to two adults and two children for just £25.
- 17 Mar - The Co-operative Group announced that Jamie Rooney has signed alongside Paul Sculthorpe to form part of their 2010 ambassador line-up.
- 18 Mar - Widnes Vikings set a new highest attendance record for the 2010 Co-Operative Championship season. 3,686 fans were in attendance to witness the Widnes Vikings take on Halifax RLFC at the Stobart Stadium Halton.
- 19 Mar - A new record low attendance for the 2010 Co-Operative Championship season is set. Only 835 fans attended the round 3 fixture between Sheffield Eagles and Dewsbury Rams at the Don Valley Stadium.
- 23 Mar - Gareth Haggerty is suspended for 4 matches and fined £50 by the RFL disciplinary panel. Haggerty was found guilty of a category C offence for "use of forearm on a player not in possession of the ball". Haggerty was put on report during the clash between Sheffield Eagles and Widnes Vikings at the Don Valley Stadium when an off the ball incident between Haggerty and Sam Barlow was not witnessed by the referee.

May 2010

- 6 May - Featherstone Rovers 100% unbeaten record for the 2010 Co-Operative Championship season came to an end when they were beaten at home 24 - 26 by Touoluse. Featherstone has started the season by winning 8 consecutive league games.

== League table ==
2010 Co-operative Championship
| Pos | Team | Pld | W | D | L | PF | PA | PD | BP | Pts | Qualification or relegation |
|---|---|---|---|---|---|---|---|---|---|---|---|
| 1 | Featherstone Rovers | 20 | 18 | 0 | 2 | 735 | 334 | +401 | 2 | 56 | Qualified for the Play-offs |
| 2 | Halifax | 20 | 16 | 0 | 4 | 684 | 509 | +175 | 2 | 50 | Qualified for the Play-offs |
| 3 | Leigh Centurions | 20 | 12 | 1 | 7 | 580 | 403 | +177 | 5 | 43 | Qualified for the Play-offs |
| 4 | Barrow Raiders | 20 | 12 | 1 | 7 | 607 | 449 | +158 | 1 | 39 | Qualified for the Play-offs |
| 5 | Widnes Vikings | 20 | 11 | 0 | 9 | 619 | 488 | +131 | 5 | 38 | Qualified for the Play-offs |
| 6 | Sheffield Eagles | 20 | 10 | 1 | 9 | 503 | 555 | −52 | 1 | 33 | Qualified for the Play-offs |
| 7 | Batley Bulldogs | 20 | 7 | 0 | 13 | 479 | 488 | −9 | 8 | 29 | |
| 8 | Toulouse Olympique | 20 | 8 | 0 | 12 | 486 | 649 | −163 | 3 | 27 | |
| 9 | Dewsbury Rams | 20 | 6 | 0 | 14 | 454 | 503 | −49 | 8 | 26 | |
| 10 | Whitehaven (R) | 20 | 4 | 0 | 16 | 281 | 707 | −426 | 4 | 16 | Relegation position |
| 11 | Keighley Cougars (R) | 20 | 4 | 1 | 15 | 362 | 703 | −341 | −4 | 10 (Note: Keighley had 5 bonus points, but started the season on −9 points for going into administration.) | Relegation position |

Updated to match(es) played on 25 August 2010 (1:12pm). Source:
Rules for classification: 1st on competition points; 2nd on match points difference.
Competition points: For win = 3; For draw = 2; For loss by 12 points or fewer = 1.
(R) Relegated

== Play-offs ==
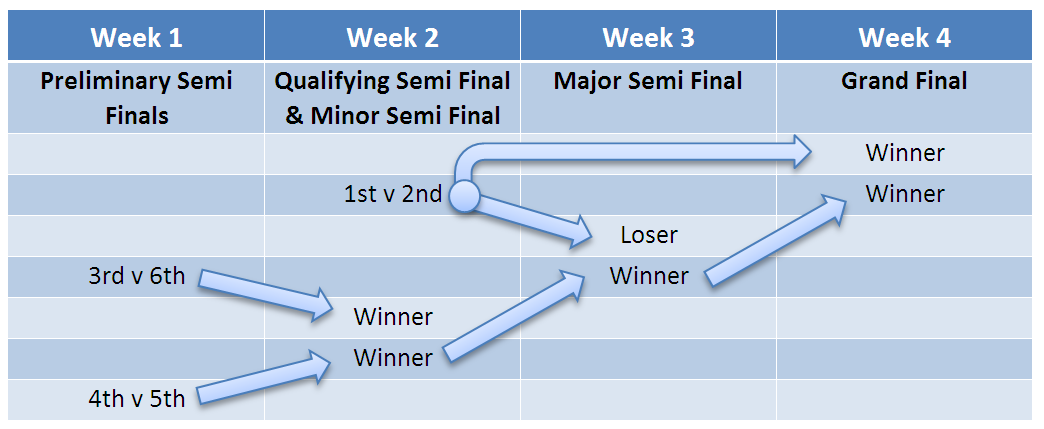
The 2010 Co-Operative Championship play-off structure.

The play-offs commence following the conclusion of 22 round regular season and include the top six sides from the league.

The 2010 play-offs culminate in a grand final to be held at Halliwell Jones Stadium in Warrington, home of Super League side Warrington Wolves.

The Co-operative Championship uses a top-6 play-off system.

=== Preliminary semi-finals ===
| Home | Score | Away | Match information |
| Home | Score | Away | Date and time | Venue | Referee | Attendance |
|---|---|---|---|---|---|---|
| Leigh Centurions | 24 – 26 | Sheffield Eagles | 2 September, 19:30 GMT | Leigh Sports Village | | 1,516 |
| Barrow Raiders | 38 – 0 | Widnes Vikings | 5 September, 15:00 GMT | Craven Park | | 2,434 |

=== Qualifying and minor semi-final ===
| Home | Score | Away | Match information |
| Home | Score | Away | Date and time | Venue | Referee | Attendance |
|---|---|---|---|---|---|---|
| Featherstone Rovers | 46 – 16 | Halifax | 9 September, 19:30 BST | Post Office Road | Robert Hicks | 2,553 |
| Barrow Raiders | 14 – 21 | Sheffield Eagles | 10 September, 20:00 BST | Craven Park | Gareth Hewer | 2,231 |

=== Major semi-final ===
| Home | Score | Away | Match information |
| Home | Score | Away | Date and time | Venue | Referee | Attendance |
|---|---|---|---|---|---|---|
| Halifax | 42 – 16 | Sheffield Eagles | 16 September 2010, 19:30 BST | The Shay | Robert Hicks | 1,490 |

=== Grand final ===
| Home | Score | Away | Match information |
| Home | Score | Away | Date and time | Venue | Referee | Attendance |
|---|---|---|---|---|---|---|
| Featherstone Rovers | 22 – 23* | Halifax | 26 September, 17:30 BST | Halliwell Jones Stadium | Robert Hicks | 9,443 |
*Halifax won in extra time via the golden point rule.

== Attendances ==
| | Team | Played | Highest | Lowest | Total | Average |
|---|---|---|---|---|---|---|
| 1 | Widnes Vikings | 10 | 3,686 | 2,659 | 30,205 | 3,021 |
| 2 | Halifax | 10 | 4,795 | 1,725 | 25,090 | 2,509 |
| 3 | Leigh Centurions | 10 | 3,392 | 1,265 | 20,180 | 2,018 |
| 4 | Featherstone Rovers | 10 | 2,353 | 1,353 | 19,120 | 1,912 |
| 5 | Barrow Raiders | 10 | 2,072 | 1,328 | 17,170 | 1,717 |
| 6 | Toulouse Olympique | 10 | 2,500 | 850 | 14,380 | 1,438 |
| 7 | Sheffield Eagles | 10 | 2,871 | 835 | 13,080 | 1,308 |
| 8 | Dewsbury Rams | 10 | 1,935 | 850 | 11,950 | 1,195 |
| 9 | Keighley Cougars | 10 | 1,602 | 736 | 10,830 | 1,083 |
| 10 | Batley Bulldogs | 10 | 1,837 | 689 | 10,580 | 1,058 |
| 11 | Whitehaven | 10 | 1,580 | 504 | 9990 | 999 |
| | Playoffs | 6 | 9,443 | 1,490 | 19,667 | 3,278 |
| | Total | 116 | 9,443 | 504 | 202,242 | 1,743 |

== See also ==
- 2010 RFL Championship Results
- Co-operative Championship
- 2010 Championship 1
- British rugby league system
- Super League
- Rugby League Conference
- Northern Ford Premiership
- National League Cup
