= 2010 Championship Cup =

British rugby league competition

- Teams: 20
- Total attendance: 49,202 (average: 1,144)

2010 season
- Season Champions: Batley Bulldogs
- Runners-up: Widnes Vikings

The 2010 Championship Cup (known for commercial reasons as the Northern Rail Cup) was the 9th season of the rugby league football competition for clubs in Great Britain's Co-operative Championship and Championship One.

The final was played at Bloomfield Road in Blackpool with Batley Bulldogs defeating the Widnes Vikings 25–24 to claim the trophy.

== Format ==
The format and structure of the 2010 Northern Rail Cup competition was the same as in 2009. All the English-based Co-operative Championship and Championship One clubs have been divided equally into two pools for the group stages with five teams from each division in each pool.

Each team played two home games and two away games against teams in their pool with each club playing an equal number of The Co-operative Championship and The Co-operative Championship One clubs.

The top four teams in each pool following the conclusion of the group stage fixtures then progressed into an open draw for the knock-out quarter-final stage.

The Northern Rail Cup quarter-finals were played on the weekend of 5 and 6 June with the semi-finals taking place on 19 and 20 June.

The winners of the Northern Rail Cup were eligible to apply for a Super League licence in 2011.

Toulouse Olympique and newly formed South Wales Scorpions did not participate in the 2010 Northern Rail Cup.

== Fixtures ==
=== Pool 1 ===
==== Round 1 ====
Home	Score	Away	Match information			
Home	Score	Away	Date & time	Referee	Venue	Attendance
Whitehaven	26 – 34	Batley Bulldogs	10 February, 19:30 GMT		Recreation Ground (Whitehaven)	888
Widnes Vikings	50 – 6	Gateshead Thunder	2 February, 15:00 GMT		Stobart Stadium Halton	2,200
Blackpool Panthers	22 – 24	Keighley Cougars	31 January, 15:00 GMT		Woodlands Memorial Ground	
Doncaster	0 – 60	Barrow Raiders	17 February, 19:45 GMT		Keepmoat Stadium	285
Workington Town	18 – 19	Swinton Lions	17 February, 19:30 GMT		Derwent Park	286

==== Round 2 ====
Home	Score	Away	Match information			
Home	Score	Away	Date & time	Referee	Venue	Attendance
Barrow Raiders	34 – 8	Blackpool Panthers	7 February, 14:00 GMT		Craven Park	1,474
Batley Bulldogs	30 – 30	Widnes Vikings	7 February, 14:00 GMT		Mount Pleasant, Batley	1,004
Keighley Cougars	17 – 16	Whitehaven	7 February, 14:00 GMT		Cougar Park	756
Gateshead Thunder	12 – 26	Workington Town	7 February, 15:00 GMT		Gateshead International Stadium	404
Swinton Lions	30 – 20	Doncaster	7 February, 15:00 GMT		Park Lane (stadium)	380

==== Round 3 ====
Home	Score	Away	Match information			
Home	Score	Away	Date & time	Referee	Venue	Attendance
Batley Bulldogs	46 - 10	Swinton Lions	14 February, 14:00 GMT		Mount Pleasant, Batley	999
Keighley Cougars	38 - 10	Workington Town	14 February, 15:00 GMT		Cougar Park	654
Whitehaven	54 - 10	Doncaster	14 February, 14:00 GMT		Recreation Ground (Whitehaven)	808
Widnes Vikings	22 - 20	Barrow Raiders	14 February, 15:00 GMT		Stobart Stadium Halton	3,432
Blackpool Panthers	74 - 6	Gateshead Thunder	14 February, 15:00 GMT		Woodlands Memorial Ground	

==== Round 4 ====
Home	Score	Away	Match information			
Home	Score	Away	Date & time	Referee	Venue	Attendance
Barrow Raiders	62 - 18	Keighley Cougars	10 March, 19:45 GMT	Craig Halloran	Craven Park	1,277
Doncaster	20 – 40	Blackpool Panthers	24 March, 19:45 GMT	Tim Roby	Keepmoat Stadium	198
Gateshead Thunder	4 - 100	Batley Bulldogs	17 March, 19:30 GMT	Chris Leatherbarrow	Gateshead International Stadium	237
Swinton Lions	12 - 36	Widnes Vikings	21 February, 15:00 GMT	Warren Turley	Park Lane (stadium)	816
Workington Town	22 - 14	Whitehaven	21 February, 15:00 GMT	M Thomason	Derwent Park	738

==== Pool 1 qualification table ====
2010 Northern Rail Cup: Pool 1
Pos	Team	Pld	W	D	L	PF	PA	PD	BP	Pts
1	Batley Bulldogs	4	3	1	0	210	70	+140	0	11
2	Widnes Vikings	4	3	1	0	138	68	+70	0	11
3	Barrow Raiders	4	3	0	1	176	48	+128	1	10
4	Keighley Cougars	4	3	0	1	144	110	+34	0	9
5	Blackpool Panthers	4	2	0	2	144	84	+60	1	7
6	Workington Town	4	2	0	2	76	83	−7	1	7
7	Whitehaven	4	1	0	3	110	83	+27	3	6
8	Swinton Lions	4	2	0	2	71	120	−49	0	6
9	Doncaster	4	0	0	4	50	184	−134	1	1
10	Gateshead Thunder	4	0	0	4	28	250	−222	0	0

Source: Northern Rail Cup Table – The RFL
Rules for classification: 1st on competition points; 2nd on match points difference. Competition Points: For win = 3; For draw = 2; For loss by 12 points or fewer = 1.

=== Pool 2 ===
==== Round 1 ====
Home	Score	Away	Match information			
Home	Score	Away	Date & time	Referee	Venue	Attendance
Dewsbury Rams	50 - 4	London Skolars	31 January, 15:00 GMT		Tetley's Stadium	887
Leigh Centurions	24 - 12	Oldham	31 January, 15:00 GMT		Leigh Sports Village	1,627
Sheffield Eagles	13 - 6	Halifax	17 February, 19:45 GMT		Don Valley Stadium	851
Hunslet Hawks	0 - 68	Featherstone Rovers	4 March, 20:00 GMT		South Leeds Stadium	
Rochdale Hornets	12 - 36	York City Knights	17 February, 20:00 GMT		Spotland Stadium	362

==== Round 2 ====
Home	Score	Away	Match information			
Home	Score	Away	Date & time	Referee	Venue	Attendance
Featherstone Rovers	18 - 18	Sheffield Eagles	7 February, 15:00 GMT		Chris Moyles Stadium	1,175
Halifax	24 - 0	Dewsbury Rams	7 February, 15:00 GMT		Shay Stadium	2,141
London Skolars	12 - 60	Hunslet Hawks	7 February, 14:00 GMT		New River Stadium	328
Oldham	22 - 14	Rochdale Hornets	8 February, 20:00 GMT		Boundary Park	
York City Knights	13 - 12	Leigh Centurions	7 February, 15:00 GMT		Huntington Stadium	911

==== Round 3 ====
Home	Score	Away	Match information			
Home	Score	Away	Date & time	Referee	Venue	Attendance
Leigh Centurions	36 - 6	Featherstone Rovers	14 February, 15:00 GMT		Leigh Sports Village	1,729
Sheffield Eagles	40 - 10	York City Knights	14 February, 15:00 GMT		Don Valley Stadium	840
Hunslet Hawks	28 - 14	Oldham	14 February, 14:00 GMT		John Charles Centre for Sport	519
London Skolars	0 - 68	Halifax	14 February, 15:00 GMT		New River Stadium	416
Rochdale Hornets	12 - 48	Dewsbury Rams	14 February, 15:00 GMT		Spotland Stadium	575

==== Round 4 ====
Home	Score	Away	Match information			
Home	Score	Away	Date & time	Referee	Venue	Attendance
Featherstone Rovers	56 - 10	Rochdale Hornets	23 February, 20:00 GMT	Craig Halloran	Chris Moyles Stadium	777
Dewsbury Rams	22 - 44	Leigh Centurions	3 March, 19:45 GMT	Jamie Leahy	Tetley's Stadium	888
Halifax	36 - 42	Hunslet Hawks	21 March, 15:00 GMT	Ronnie Laughton	Shay Stadium	1,771
Oldham	22 - 24	Sheffield Eagles	21 February, 15:00 GMT	Robert Hicks	Boundary Park	340
York City Knights	34 - 12	London Skolars	10 March, 19:00 GMT	Tim Roby	Huntington Stadium	439

==== Pool 2 qualification table ====
2010 Northern Rail Cup: Pool 2
Pos	Team	Pld	W	D	L	PF	PA	PD	BP	Pts
1	Sheffield Eagles (Q)	4	3	1	0	95	56	+39	0	11
2	Leigh Centurions (Q)	4	3	0	1	116	53	+63	1	10
3	York City Knights (Q)	4	3	0	1	93	76	+17	0	9
4	Hunslet Hawks (Q)	4	3	0	1	130	130	0	0	9
5	Featherstone Rovers	4	2	1	1	148	64	+84	0	8
6	Halifax	4	2	0	2	134	55	+79	2	8
7	Dewsbury Rams	4	2	0	2	120	84	+36	0	6
8	Oldham	4	1	0	3	70	90	−20	2	5
9	Rochdale Hornets	4	0	0	4	48	162	−114	1	1
10	London Skolars	4	0	0	4	28	212	−184	0	0

Source: Northern Rail Cup Table – The RFL
Rules for classification: 1st on competition points; 2nd on match points difference. Competition Points: For win = 3; For draw = 2; For loss by 12 points or fewer = 1.
(Q) Teams qualifying for the next round

=== Finals ===
Sky Sports televised one Northern Rail Cup quarter-final tie live on Thursday 3 June and one of the semi-finals on Thursday 17 June as well as providing full coverage of the Northern Rail Cup final at Bloomfield Road, Blackpool, on Sunday 18 July.

Quarter-finals
1	Keighley Cougars	32
2	York City Knights	6
3	Widnes Vikings	26
4	Barrow Raiders	12
5	Batley Bulldogs	26
6	Sheffield Eagles	16
7	Hunslet Hawks	6
8	Leigh Centurions	42

Semi-finals
Keighley Cougars	18
Widnes Vikings	48
Leigh Centurions	4
Batley Bulldogs	25

Final
Batley Bulldogs	25
Widnes Vikings	24

==== Quarter-finals ====
The Northern Rail Cup quarter-final draw took place on Wednesday 24 March and was broadcast live on Sky Sports’ weekly Boots N' All programme.

Barrow, Batley, Hunslet, Keighley, Leigh, Sheffield, Widnes & York all qualified for the quarter-final stage of the competition. The eight teams were entered into the open draw for the quarter-final knock-out stages which was played on the weekend of 5 and 6 June. Only Hunslet and York come from Co-operative Championship 1.

One quarter-final tie was brought forward to Thursday 3 June to be screened live on Sky Sports.

The teams lined up as per the table below:

Home	Score	Away	Match information			
Home	Score	Away	Date & time	Referee	Venue	Attendance
Widnes Vikings	26 – 12	Barrow Raiders	19:30, 3 June 2010		Stobart Stadium Halton	1,718
Keighley Cougars	32 – 6	York City Knights	15:00 6 June 2010		Cougar Park	712
Batley Bulldogs	26 – 16	Sheffield Eagles	15:00 6 June 2010		Mount Pleasant	708
Hunslet Hawks	6 – 42	Leigh Centurions	15:00 6 June 2010		South Leeds Stadium	770

==== Semi-finals ====
The semi-finals will take place on the weekend of 19 and 20 June with Sky Sports broadcasting one tie live on the Thursday night.

Home	Score	Away	Match information			
Home	Score	Away	Date & time	Referee	Venue	Attendance
Leigh Centurions	4 – 25	Batley Bulldogs	19:30, 17 June 2010		Leigh Sports Village	2,058
Keighley Cougars	18 – 48	Widnes Vikings	15:00 20 June 2010		Cougar Park	1,686

==== Final ====
The Northern Rail Cup final took place at Bloomfield Road, Blackpool on Sunday 18 July at 4pm live on Sky Sports. The Match was contested by Batley Bulldogs and defending champions Widnes Vikings, who were looking for their 3rd cup victory in just 4 years. Batley won the match, beating Widnes 25-24 thanks to two late tries from Alex Brown. This was Batley's first appearance in a cup final since 1998 and first in a major final since 1952. The victory leaves Batley eligible to apply for the 2012–14 Super League licences to gain promotion to the Super League, although coach Karl Harrison stated that they have no Super League ambitions.

Home	Score	Away	Match information			
Home	Score	Away	Date & time	Referee	Venue	Attendance
Batley Bulldogs	25-24	Widnes Vikings	16:00 18 July 2010	Robert Hicks	Bloomfield Road, Blackpool	8,138

== See also ==
- 2010 RFL Championship
- 2010 Championship 1
