= Keegan Hirst =

English rugby league player

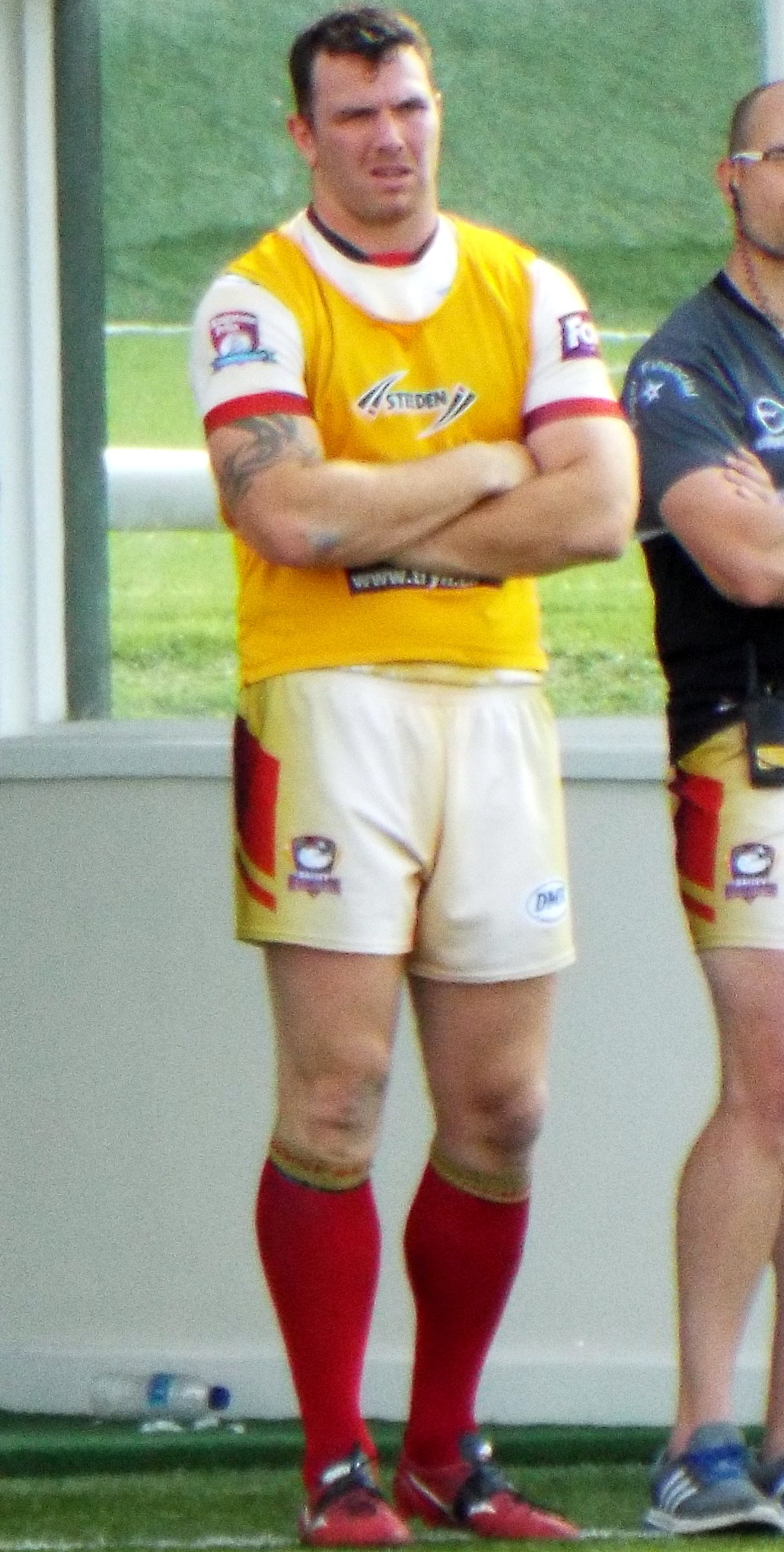

Personal information
- Born: 13 February 1988 (age 38) Batley, West Yorkshire, England
- Height: 6 ft 5 in (1.96 m)
- Weight: 19 st 3 lb (122 kg)

Playing information
- Position: Prop
Club
Years	Team	Pld	T	G	FG	P
2007	Dewsbury Rams	10	1	0	0	4
2008	Hunslet Hawks	18	2	0	0	8
2009–11	Dewsbury Rams	69	6	0	0	24
2012–13	Batley Bulldogs	52	4	0	0	16
2014	Featherstone Rovers	20	0	0	0	0
2014–16	Batley Bulldogs	68	8	0	0	32
2017–19	Wakefield Trinity	66	1	0	0	4
2017(loan)	→ Dewsbury Rams	2	1	0	0	4
2019(loan)	→ Halifax	4	0	0	0	0
2020	Halifax	5	0	0	0	0
2023	Batley Bulldogs	8	1	0	0	4
	Total	322	24	0	0	96
- Source: As of 12 April 2026

Keegan Hirst (born 13 February 1988) is an English professional rugby league player who played most recently as a prop for the Batley Bulldogs in the Championship, a personal trainer and a podcaster.

He played for the Hunslet Hawks in 2008 National League Two, and the Dewsbury Rams in 2009 Championship 1 and the Championship. Hirst also played for the Batley Bulldogs in two separate spells and for Featherstone Rovers in the Championship. He played for Wakefield Trinity in the Super League, and spent time on loan from Wakefield at Dewsbury and Halifax in the second tier. After the abandonment of the 2020 Championship season, Hirst signed for a third spell with Batley but in October 2020 announced his retirement from the game.

In 2015, he became the first British professional rugby league player to come out as gay.

== Background ==
Hirst was born in Batley, West Yorkshire, England.

== Playing career ==
Hirst began his career as an academy player at Bradford Bulls before joining Hunslet Hawks in 2008. After a season with the Hunslet Hawks, Hirst moved to Dewsbury Rams for two seasons and then moved to Batley Bulldogs for the 2012 season. In 2013 he moved to Featherstone Rovers but returned to Batley, first on loan and then on a permanent move in 2014.

In August 2016, Hirst signed a deal with Wakefield Trinity to play for the Super League side from 2017. Hirst made his Super League début in the round six match of Super League XXII against Leigh Centurions.

== In popular culture ==
In 2016, Hirst was a dater on Channel 4's dating show First Dates, also in 2016 Hirst took part in W's Celebrity Haunted Hotel.

== Personal life ==
Hirst is divorced with two children. In an interview with the Sunday Mirror in August 2015 he came out as gay, becoming the first British professional rugby league player to do so.

From May 2022, Hirst was in a relationship with British YouTuber Joel Wood with whom he created in 2023 the podcast Happy Healthy Homo, also available in a video version on YouTube, essentially aimed at LGBTQ+ listeners, but also who they inclusively call "allies" or more jokingly "honorary homos". In January 2026, Wood announced on Instagram that the couple had decided to end their relationship.

In November 2024, Hirst was diagnosed with dilated cardiomyopathy and heart failure for which he needs a constant medication treatment.

== See also ==
- Ian Roberts – first openly gay rugby league player
- Gareth Thomas – first openly gay rugby union player
