= 2009 Barrow Raiders season =

The Barrow Raiders, the English professional rugby league team from Barrow-in-Furness, Cumbria, competed in the second-tier competition of British rugby league, the 2009 Co-operative Championship.

== Table ==
2009 Co-operative Championship
Pos	Team	Pld	W	D	L	PF	PA	PD	BP	Pts	Qualification
1	Barrow Raiders	20	13	0	7	632	361	+271	5	44	Qualified for the play-offs
2	Halifax	20	13	0	7	714	476	+238	4	43	Qualified for the play-offs
3	Sheffield Eagles	20	11	0	9	635	447	+188	9	42	Qualified for the play-offs
4	Widnes Vikings	20	11	0	9	649	438	+211	6	39	Qualified for the play-offs
5	Whitehaven	20	12	0	8	565	567	−2	3	39	Qualified for the play-offs
6	Featherstone Rovers	20	12	0	8	619	524	+95	1	37	Qualified for the play-offs
7	Gateshead Thunder	20	9	2	9	610	657	−47	3	32	
8	Batley Bulldogs	20	8	2	10	536	620	−84	6	32	
9	Leigh Centurions	20	9	0	11	426	572	−146	5	32	Relegated
10	Toulouse Olympique XIII	20	9	0	11	556	582	−26	3	30 (Note: Toulouse were exempt from relegation.)	
11	Doncaster	20	1	0	19	257	955	−698	−4	−1 (Note: Doncaster had 5 bonus points, but lost 9 competition points for entering administration.)	Relegated

Source: www.cooperativechampionship.co.uk and Rugby-League.com
Rules for classification: 1st on league points; 2nd on match points difference.

== 2009 Fixtures and results ==
Competition	Round	Opponent	Result	Score	Home/Away	Venue	Attendance	Date
Northern Rail Cup	-	Rochdale Hornets	Win	12-54	Away	Spotland Stadium	510	15/02/2009
Northern Rail Cup	-	Halifax	Loss	40-10	Away	Shay stadium	1,687	22/02/2009
Northern Rail Cup	-	Keighley Cougars	Win	34-7	Home	Craven Park	1,311	01/03/2009
Northern Rail Cup	-	Widnes Vikings	Win	12-4	Home	Craven Park	1,563	04/03/2009
Challenge Cup	3	Blackpool Panthers	Win	44-12	Home	Craven Park	1,187	08/03/2009
Co-operative Championship	1	Doncaster	Win	34-14	Home	Craven Park	1,809	14/03/2009
Co-operative Championship	2	Gateshead Thunder	Win	14-38	Away	Gateshead International Stadium	502	22/03/2009
Co-operative Championship	3	Halifax	Loss	26-28	Home	Craven Park	1,918	28/03/2009
Challenge Cup	4	Wigan Warriors	Loss	20-32	Home	Craven Park	6,275	05/04/200
Co-operative Championship	4	Whitehaven	Win	18-12	Home	Craven Park	2,910	10/04/2009
Co-operative Championship	5	Leigh Centurions	Win	16-25	Away	Leigh Sports Village	2,177	13/04/2009
Co-operative Championship	7	Batley Bulldogs	Win	52-0	Home	Craven Park	1,757	25/04/2009
Co-operative Championship	8	Widnes Vikings	Win	6-27	Away	Halton Stadium	3,290	30/04/2009
Co-operative Championship	10	Toulouse Olympique	Loss	22-14	Away	Stade des Minimes	2,900	16/05/2009
Co-operative Championship	11	Featherstone Rovers	Win	44-12	Home	Craven Park	1,995	24/05/2009
Co-operative Championship	12	Sheffield Eagles	Win	26-18	Home	Craven Park	1,693	30/05/2009
Northern Rail Cup	QF	Dewsbury Rams	Win	20-18	Away	Boundary Park	1,650	06/06/2009
Co-operative Championship	13	Halifax	Loss	30-24	Away	Shay stadium	2,872	14/06/2009
Northern Rail Cup	SF	Featherstone Rovers	Win	30-24	Away	Craven Park	2,775	17/06/2009
Co-operative Championship	14	Batley Bulldogs	Loss	46-16	Away	Mount Pleasant	1,002	28/06/2009
Co-operative Championship	15	Toulouse Olympique	Win	30-22	Home	Craven Park	2,456	02/07/2009
Northern Rail Cup	F	Widnes Vikings	Loss	30-24	-	Bloomfield Road	8,720	11/07/2009
Co-operative Championship	16	Whitehaven	Loss	28-4	Away	Recreation Ground	2,708	16/07/2009
Co-operative Championship	17	Leigh Centurions	Win	74-6	Home	Craven Park	1,934	25/07/2009
Co-operative Championship	19	Doncaster	Win	0-64	Away	Keepmoat Stadium	481	09/08/2009
Co-operative Championship	20	Widnes Vikings	Win	38-16	Home	Craven Park	3,050	15/08/2009
Co-operative Championship	21	Featherstone Rovers	Win	28-46	Away	Chris Moyles Stadium	2,099	23/08/2009
Co-operative Championship	9	Gateshead Thunder	Loss	12-16	Home	Craven Park	2,981	30/08/2009
Co-operative Championship	22	Sheffield Eagles	Loss	29-22	Away	Don Valley Stadium	1,283	06/09/2009
Co-operative Championship	SF	Halifax	Win	35-12	Home	Craven Park	2,823	17/09/2009
Co-operative Championship	F	Halifax	Win	26-18	-	Halliwell Jones Stadium	11,398	04/10/2009
