= Martin Crompton =

Former Ireland international rugby league footballer

Personal information
- Born: 27 September 1969 (age 56) Ince-in-Makerfield, Wigan, England

Playing information
- Position: Scrum-half
Club
Years	Team	Pld	T	G	FG	P
1987–92	Warrington	81	21	0	2	86
1992–93	Wigan	19	4	0	0	16
1993–97	Oldham	118	41	0	11	175
1998–00	Salford City Reds	46	13	6	3	67
2001	Widnes Vikings	29	9	0	0	36
	Total	293	88	6	16	380
Representative
Years	Team	Pld	T	G	FG	P
1995–99	Ireland	9	4	0	1	17

Coaching information
Club
Years	Team	Gms	W	D	L	W%
2008–10	Blackpool Panthers	0	0	0	0

Martin Crompton (born 29 September 1969) is a former professional rugby league footballer who played in the 1980s, 1990s and 2000s, usually as a scrum-half.

== Playing career ==
=== Warrington ===
Born in Ince-in-Makerfield, Wigan, Crompton initially played for Warrington. Crompton played stand-off in Warrington's 14–36 defeat by Wigan in the 1990 Challenge Cup Final during the 1989–90 season at Wembley Stadium, London on Saturday 28 April 1990, in front of a crowd of 77,729.

=== Wigan ===
Crompton moved to his hometown club Wigan in 1992, following the sale of Andy Gregory. The transfer fee was decided via tribunal, with Wigan paying £65,000 to Warrington, plus an additional £20,000 if Crompton represented Great Britain. However, coach John Monie chose to play Shaun Edwards and Frano Botica at half back, resulting in Crompton's first team starts being seldom. During the 1992–93 season, Crompton appeared as a substitute (replacing wing Martin Offiah) in Wigan's 5–4 victory over St Helens in the 1992 Lancashire Cup Final at Knowsley Road, St Helens on 18 October 1992. Crompton also played from the interchange bench in the 1992 World Club Challenge against the visiting Brisbane Broncos on 30 October 1992.

=== Later career ===
After a season with Wigan, Crompton went to Oldham in September 1993, and became captain of the Roughyeds. When Oldham was relegated from Super League, Crompton went to Salford City Reds. After a few seasons with Salford, he moved to Widnes Vikings, helping the club win promotion to the Super League. He retired from rugby league but was an assistant coach at Widnes.

=== International career ===
Crompton was named in England's 40-man training squad in preparation for the 1995 Rugby League World Cup, but chose to represent Ireland instead, and played for the team in the 1995 Emerging Nations Tournament. He was also selected for Ireland at the 2000 Rugby League World Cup.

== Coaching career ==
Crompton was appointed as head coach at Blackpool Panthers in 2007. In April 2008, he oversaw the club's first win in nearly two years against Workington Town. The club improved over the next couple of seasons, reaching the playoffs in the 2009 and 2010 Championship 1 seasons. However, the club went into administration in October 2010, and Crompton resigned shortly afterwards.
