= Carnegie Floodlit Nines =

Rugby league nines event in England

Carnegie Floodlit Nines is a rugby league nines event held at Headingley Stadium in Leeds, West Yorkshire, England. The same stadium hosted the Headingley Sevens, rugby league sevens tournament from 1965-78. The old BBC2 Floodlit Trophy is awarded to the winner of the competition.

== 2008 Event ==
The first Carnegie Nines event was held on Wednesday August 27, 2008 in front of a crowd of 2,232 spectators. The tournament featured a mixture of professional sides from England along with representative sides from the British Army, Cumbria, Fiji Rugby UK and Leeds Metropolitan University. Rugby sevens legend Waisale Serevi played for Fiji UK. Before the main event, amateur clubs and development teams took part in an invitational junior tournament.

The full list of teams that took part in the event were:

- British Army
- Cumbria
- Fiji UK
- Hull
- Hull Kingston Rovers
- Huddersfield Giants
- Leeds Rhinos
- Wakefield Trinity Wildcats

The Huddersfield Giants won the inaugural competition, defeating Hull F.C. 22-10 in the final, to reach the final they defeated Leeds Rhinos in the first round, Hull Kingston Rovers in the Semi-final.

== 2009 Event ==
The 2009 Event took place on Wednesday August 26, once again at Headingley Stadium in Leeds. Six super league clubs along with representational clubs again competed in the event. Before the main event, there was a competition to determine the fastest player in rugby league, with representatives from a number of Super League clubs hoping to compete.

Since the 2008 event, it was decided that this year's competition would have a 2 minute sin bin period for player misconduct, reduced from 5 minutes, to better reflect the length of games.

The full list of teams entered into the 2009 event are:

- Jamaica
- Cumbria RL
- Leeds Met RL
- British Army
- The Royal Air Force (2009 Cheltenham Nines winners)
- Blackpool Panthers (2009 Northern Rail Nines winners)
- Warrington Wolves
- Hull
- Hull Kingston Rovers
- Huddersfield Giants
- Leeds Rhinos
- Wakefield Trinity Wildcats

=== 2009 Fastest Man in Rugby League ===
Before the Nines competition, the stadium held host to the 2009 Fastest man in Rugby League competition, in which rugby league players raced over 96m in full playing kit to determine the fastest player in Rugby League. The provisional entries for the competition are as follows:

- Kevin Penny (Warrington)
- Jamel Chisholm (Leeds)
- Jack Briscoe (Hull FC)
- Peter Fox (Hull KR)
- Roy Calvert (Jamaica)
- Tom Lineham (York City Knights)
- Luke George (Wakefield)
- Amos Roberts (Wigan)
- James Ford (Castleford)

The competition has been revived after it was first held in Wigan in 2005, However in the previous event the players had to run 90m while in full playing kit and carrying a ball.

The person who went on to win the race was Leeds Rhinos youth prospect, Jamel Chisholm, who won the race in a photo finish from Warrington's Kevin Penny with York City Knights Tom Lineham 3rd and Hull FC's Jack Briscoe 4th.
