= 2005 National League Cup =

The 2005 National League Cup (known for commercial reasons as the Northern Rail Cup) was a British rugby league competition. The 2005 competition was the first to feature sides from National League Three: previously the competition had only featured sides from National Leagues One and Two.

There were no cross-group games in the 2005 competition, each team therefore played only six games in the group stages. The top team from each of the first five groups progressed to the quarter-final directly. The second-placed team in each of these groups, plus the top team from group six (the group of teams from National League 3), played an additional round to determine the remaining three spots in the quarter-finals.

The winners of the 2005 Northern Rail Cup were Hull Kingston Rovers, beating Castleford in the final.

== Group stages ==
=== Group 1 ===
Team	Played	Won	Drew	Lost	For	Against	Difference	Points	WHI	WOR	GAT	BAR
Whitehaven	6	5	0	1	238	56	182	10	—N/a	58–10	44–12	44–0
Workington Town	6	4	0	2	184	140	44	8	28–8	—N/a	44–14	28–18
Gateshead Thunder	6	2	0	4	115	207	–92	4	4–44	30–20	—N/a	20–29
Barrow Raiders	6	1	0	5	89	223	–134	2	2–42	12–54	28–35	—N/a

=== Group 2 ===
Team	Played	Won	Drew	Lost	For	Against	Difference	Points	ROC	SWI	OLD	BLA
Rochdale Hornets	6	5	0	1	288	118	170	10	—N/a	54–20	68–26	62–16
Swinton Lions	6	4	1	1	171	150	21	9	20–14	—N/a	46–14	14–14
Oldham	6	2	0	4	137	241	–104	4	10–54	30–37	—N/a	22–20
Blackpool Panthers	6	0	1	5	116	203	–87	1	26–36	24–34	16–35	—N/a

=== Group 3 ===
Team	Played	Won	Drew	Lost	For	Against	Difference	Points	HFX	HKR	KEI	LON
Halifax	6	5	0	1	240	95	145	10	—N/a	34–26	42–12	60–12
Hull Kingston Rovers	6	5	0	1	244	104	140	10	21–14	—N/a	36–6	78–20
Keighley Cougars	6	2	0	4	147	181	–34	4	24–50	26–27	—N/a	38–10
London Skolars	6	0	0	6	62	313	–251	0	0–40	4–56	16–41	—N/a

=== Group 4 ===
Team	Played	Won	Drew	Lost	For	Against	Difference	Points	CAS	FEV	YOR	HUN
Castleford Tigers	6	6	0	0	237	50	187	12	—N/a	35–16	52–2	70–0
Featherstone Rovers	6	3	1	2	123	127	–4	7	10–22	—N/a	21–20	28–18
York City Knights	6	1	1	4	104	141	–37	3	16–24	20–20	—N/a	34–6
Hunslet Hawks	6	1	0	5	60	206	–146	2	6–34	12–28	18–12	—N/a

=== Group 5 ===
Team	Played	Won	Drew	Lost	For	Against	Difference	Points	DON	BAT	DEW	SHE
Doncaster Dragons	6	5	0	1	244	105	139	10	—N/a	54–0	40–10	58–20
Batley Bulldogs	6	4	0	2	124	140	-16	8	28–22	—N/a	12–10	28–16
Dewsbury Rams	6	2	0	4	135	137	–2	4	27–32	32–22	—N/a	40–8
Sheffield Eagles	6	1	0	5	93	214	–121	2	20–38	6–34	23–16	—N/a

=== Group 6 ===
Team	Played	Won	Drew	Lost	For	Against	Difference	Points	BDH	WAR	HEM	BRM
Bradford Dudley Hill	6	5	0	1	327	96	231	10	—N/a	39–12	66–8	76–0
Warrington Wizards	6	2	2	2	146	167	–21	6	52–38	—N/a	20–20	24–24
Hemel Stags	6	2	1	3	100	190	–90	5	16–52	30–20	—N/a	14–6
Bramley Buffaloes	6	1	1	4	80	200	–120	3	8–56	16–18	26–12	—N/a

=== Knockout stages ===
Home team given first.

==== Play-off Round ====
- Swinton Lions 40–24 Batley Bulldogs (1 May)
- Featherstone Rovers 44–20 Workington Town (1 May)
- Hull Kingston Rovers 64–14 Bradford Dudley Hill (1 May)

==== Quarter-finals ====
- Featherstone Rovers 14–38 Castleford Tigers (29 May)
- Doncaster Dragons 54–38 Halifax (29 May)
- Whitehaven 28–22 Rochdale Hornets (29 May)
- Hull Kingston Rovers 62–0 Swinton Lions (29 May)

==== Semi-finals ====
- Hull Kingston Rovers 34–26 Doncaster Dragons (19 June)
- Castleford Tigers 42–14 Whitehaven (19 June)

==== Final ====
- Castleford Tigers 16–18 Hull Kingston Rovers (17 July, Bloomfield Road, Blackpool)
