= 2010 Championship 1 =

- Championship 1 logo
- League: Championship 1
- Duration: 20 games each
- Teams: 11
- Total attendance: 2,896
- Broadcast partners: SKY Sports

2010 Season
- Playoff Winners: York City Knights
- League Leaders: Hunslet Hawks
- Runners-up: Oldham

The 2010 Championship 1 was a semi-professional rugby league football competition played in the United Kingdom, the third tier of the sport in the country. The winner of this league, Hunslet Hawks, were promoted to the Co-operative Championship along with play-off winners, York City Knights. There was no relegation from this league as it is the lowest tier of professional rugby league in the UK.

All of the teams competed in the 2010 Challenge Cup but South Wales did not compete in the 2010 National League Cup.

== 2010 structure ==
The competition features mainly the same teams as it did in 2009. The exceptions being that the Dewsbury Rams and the Keighley Cougars were both promoted to compete in the 2010 RFL Championship. Originally, Doncaster and the Leigh Centurions were supposed to be relegated. However, Gateshead Thunder breached the insolvency laws which meant that it was they, instead of Leigh, who were relegated.

The competition was going to contain 10 teams but one more was added when the Super League team the Crusaders left their home base at Bridgend and moved to Wrexham. This resulted in a new club being formed in Neath, South Wales, called the South Wales Scorpions who will play at the Gnoll.

Championship 1
Team	2009 Season	Stadium	Capacity	City/Area
Blackpool Panthers	5th	Woodlands Memorial Ground	N/A	Lytham St Annes, Lancashire
Doncaster	11th (Championship)	Keepmoat Stadium	15,231	Doncaster, South Yorkshire
Gateshead Thunder	7th (Championship)	Thunderdome	11,800	Gateshead, Tyne and Wear
Hunslet Hawks	6th	South Leeds Stadium	N/A	Leeds, West Yorkshire
London Skolars	10th	New River Stadium	5,000	Haringey, London
Oldham	4th	Park Lane (Season Start to May); Whitebank Stadium (May onwards)	N/A; 1050	Whitefield, Greater Manchester; Oldham, Greater Manchester
Rochdale Hornets	8th	Spotland Stadium	10,249	Rochdale, Greater Manchester
South Wales Scorpions	N/A	The Gnoll	6,000	Neath, West Glamorgan, Wales
Swinton Lions	7th	Park Lane	N/A	Swinton, Greater Manchester
Workington Town	9th	Derwent Park	10,000	Workington, Cumbria
York City Knights	3rd	Huntington Stadium	3,428	York, North Yorkshire

== Table ==
Position	Club	Played	Won	Drawn	Lost	Pts for	Pts agst	Pts Diff	B.P.	Points
1	Hunslet Hawks	20	18	0	2	828	305	523	1	55
2	Oldham	20	17	0	3	694	438	256	1	52
3	York City Knights	20	12	0	8	617	524	83	3	39
4	Blackpool Panthers	20	15	0	5	805	370	435	3	38 (Note: Blackpool were docked 10 points for an operational rules breach)
5	Rochdale Hornets	20	10	0	10	630	498	132	7	37
6	South Wales Scorpions	20	9	0	11	576	468	108	7	34
7	Workington Town	20	8	1	11	494	498	−4	7	33
8	Swinton Lions	20	9	1	10	570	581	−11	4	33
9	Doncaster	20	8	0	12	518	588	−70	4	28
10	London Skolars	20	2	0	18	444	900	−456	4	10
11	Gateshead Thunder	20	1	0	19	236	1232	−996	1	-2 (Note: Gateshead were docked 6 points for entering administration)

=== 2010 Playoffs ===
Elimination play-offs
5 September 2010
3	Blackpool Panthers	36
6	Workington Town	26
5 September 2010
4	Rochdale Hornets	60
5	South Wales Scorpions	26

Qualifying/Elimination semifinal
12 September 2010
1	Oldham	41
2	York City Knights	32
12 September 2010
Blackpool Panthers	34
Rochdale Hornets	26

Elimination final
19 September 2010
York City Knights	38
Blackpool Panthers	18

Grand Final
26 September 2010, Halliwell Jones Stadium
Oldham	4
York City Knights	25

== See also ==
- Co-operative Championship
- 2010 RFL Championship
- Championship 1
