= Fair Play Index =

Rugby league ranking system

Fairplay Index
- Sport: Rugby league
- Instituted: 2007
- Winners: Hull F.C. (2009); Halifax (2009)
- Website: superleague.co.uk cooperativechampionship.co.uk

The Fair Play Index is used in the Super League and Co-operative Championship rugby league competitions as a measure to determine the fairest team over the regular season. The team with the lowest points total wins. As a result of sponsorship from Frontline, the Index is currently officially known as the Frontline Fair Play Index.

== Scoring system ==
- 1 pt
- 2 pts
- 3 pts
- 4 pts
- 5 pts

Technical penalty
Foul play penalty*
Sin bin
Sending off sufficient
Each match ban (i.e. five matches is 25 points)

* In the Co-operative Championship all penalties count one point.

== Winners ==
=== Super League Index ===
Year	Season	Winner	Games played	Fair Play Total	Average per game
2007	Super League XII	Harlequins RL	27	268	9.9
2008	Super League XIII	St. Helens	27	222	8.2
2009	Super League XIV	Hull F.C.	27	171	6.3
2010	Super League XV	Harlequins RL	27		

=== Co-operative Championship Index ===
Year	Season	Winner	Games played	Fair Play Total	Average per game
2007	National League One	Castleford Tigers	18	107	5.9
2008	National League One	Widnes Vikings	18	139	7.7
2009	Championship	Halifax	20	147	7.35
2010	Championship	Sheffield Eagles	20		

== Reward ==
The winning team from each competition is presented with a trophy and prize (£5,000 in 2008) at the end-of-season awards ceremonies.
