= 2013 Championship Cup =

- Teams: 22

2013 Season

The 2013 Championship Cup, (known for commercial reasons as the Northern Rail Cup), was the 12th and last season of the rugby league football competition for clubs in Great Britain's Championship and Championship 1.

Leigh beat Sheffield 43-28 in the final, which was played at Halifax's The Shay.

== Format ==
For 2013, the format of the competition was changed to coincide with the expansion of the Championship from 10 to 14 teams. The competition began on 3 March with a group stage containing eight teams from the 2013 Championship 1 split into two groups. Each team played four games (two home, two away) with three of the games being played against the other teams in the group and the fourth game being played against a team from the other group.

Following the completion of the group stage, the teams finishing first in each group progressed to the knock-out stages where they join the 14 teams from the Championship to make up 16 teams. There were three knock-out rounds (play-off, quarter final, semi final) before the final on 20 July 2013 at The Shay in Halifax. The final took place after the inaugural Northern Rail Bowl final, involving the two highest-ranked teams from the group stages.

== 2013 Competition Results ==
=== Group stage ===
==== Round 1 ====
Home	Score	Away	Match Information
Home	Score	Away	Date and Time	Venue	Referee	Attendance
North Wales Crusaders	48 – 12	Oldham R.L.F.C.	3 March, 14:30 GMT	Racecourse Ground	Clint Sharrad	721
Gloucestershire All Golds	18 – 36	Hemel Stags	3 March, 15:00 GMT	Prince of Wales Stadium, Cheltenham	Peter Brooke	256
Rochdale Hornets	58 – 16	Gateshead Thunder	3 March, 15:00 GMT	Spotland Stadium	Joe Cobb	508
South Wales Scorpions	12 – 54	London Skolars	3 March, 15:00 GMT	The Gnoll	Tom Crashley	329

==== Round 2 ====
Home	Score	Away	Match Information
Home	Score	Away	Date and Time	Venue	Referee	Attendance
Gateshead Thunder	4 – 30	North Wales Crusaders	10 March, 15:00 GMT	MS3 Craven Park, Hull ^{A}	Dave Sharpe	228
Gloucestershire All Golds	20 – 42	South Wales Scorpions	10 March, 15:00 GMT	Prince of Wales Stadium, Cheltenham	Clint Sharrad
London Skolars	26 – 4	Hemel Stags	10 March, 15:00 GMT	New River Stadium	Jamie Bloem
Oldham R.L.F.C.	26 – 10	Rochdale Hornets	10 March, 15:00 GMT	Whitebank Stadium	Tom Crashley	518

==== Round 3 ====
Home	Score	Away	Match Information
Home	Score	Away	Date and Time	Venue	Referee	Attendance
North Wales Crusaders	30 – 16	Rochdale Hornets	17 March, 14:30 GMT	Racecourse Ground	Peter Brooke	659
Hemel Stags	20 – 22	South Wales Scorpions	17 March, 15:00 GMT	Pennine Way stadium	Dave Sharpe	179
London Skolars	20 – 0	Gloucestershire All Golds	17 March, 15:00 GMT	New River Stadium	Tom Crashley	251
Oldham R.L.F.C.	34 – 16	Gateshead Thunder	17 March, 15:00 GMT	Whitebank Stadium	Joe Cobb	476

==== Round 4 ====
Home	Score	Away	Match Information
Home	Score	Away	Date and Time	Venue	Referee	Attendance
Gateshead Thunder	16 – 18	Gloucestershire All Golds	24 March, 15:00 GMT	Crow Trees (Blaydon RFC)^{B}	Jamie Bloem	142
South Wales Scorpions	12 – 24	Oldham R.L.F.C.	24 March, 15:00 GMT	The Gnoll	Peter Brooke	280
Rochdale Hornets	40 – 16	London Skolars	1 April 15:00 BST ^{C}	Spotland Stadium	Joe Cobb	413
Hemel Stags	24 – 36	North Wales Crusaders	23 April 19:00 BST ^{C}	Pennine Way stadium	Tom Crashley	129

==== Tables ====
2013 Northern Rail Cup: Pool A
#		PLD	W	D	L	PF	PA	PD	BP	PTS
1	North Wales Crusaders	4	4	0	0	144	56	+88	0	12
2	Oldham R.L.F.C.	4	3	0	1	96	86	+10	0	9
3	Rochdale Hornets	4	2	0	2	124	88	+36	0	6
4	Gateshead Thunder	4	0	0	4	52	140	-88	1	1

2013 Northern Rail Cup: Pool B
#		PLD	W	D	L	PF	PA	PD	BP	PTS
1	London Skolars	4	3	0	1	116	56	+60	0	9
2	South Wales Scorpions	4	2	0	2	88	118	-30	1	7
3	Hemel Stags	4	1	0	3	84	102	-18	2	5
4	Gloucestershire All Golds	4	1	0	3	56	114	-58	0	3

Teams qualifying for the next round

Tables are correct as of 23 April 2013. Source: rugbyleaguechampionships.co.uk and BBC Sport.

Classification: 1st on competition points; 2nd on match points difference.
Competition Points: For win = 3; For draw = 2; For loss by 12 points or fewer = 1

=== Knock-out Stages ===
==== Finals Tournament Bracket ====
1st Knock-out Round
Keighley Cougars	18
Batley Bulldogs	38
Workington Town	36
Hunslet Hawks	16
Featherstone Rovers	12
Leigh Centurions	22
London Skolars	16
Whitehaven	62
Swinton Lions	26
North Wales Crusaders	18
York City Knights	12
Doncaster	24
Sheffield Eagles	64
Barrow Raiders	10
Dewsbury Rams	20
Halifax	18

Quarter Final
Batley Bulldogs	30
Workington Town	4
Leigh Centurions	34
Whitehaven	18
Swinton Lions	14
Doncaster	36
Sheffield Eagles	26
Dewsbury Rams	16

Semi Final
Batley Bulldogs	6
Leigh Centurions	23
Doncaster	10
Sheffield Eagles	32

Final
Leigh Centurions	43
Sheffield Eagles	28

==== Play Off Round ====
Home	Score	Away	Match Information
Home	Score	Away	Date and Time	Venue	Referee	Attendance
Dewsbury Rams	20 – 18	Halifax	16 May, 19:30 BST	Tetley's Stadium	George Stokes	800
London Skolars	16 – 62	Whitehaven	19 May, 14:00 BST	New River Stadium	Joe Cobb	276
Featherstone Rovers	12 – 22	Leigh Centurions	19 May, 15:00 BST	Bigfellas Stadium	Matt Thomason	1,745
Keighley Cougars	18 – 38	Batley Bulldogs	19 May, 15:00 BST	Cougar Park	Dave Merrick	714
Sheffield Eagles	64 – 10	Barrow Raiders	19 May, 15:00 BST	Don Valley Stadium	Chris Leatherbarrow	408
Swinton Lions	26 – 18	North Wales Crusaders	19 May, 15:00 BST	Leigh Sports Village	Jamie Leahy	544
Workington Town	36 – 16	Hunslet Hawks	19 May, 15:00 BST	Derwent Park	Gareth Hewer	569
York City Knights	12 – 24	Doncaster	19 May, 15:00 BST	Huntington Stadium	Ronnie Laughton	451

==== Quarter-final ====
Home	Score	Away	Match Information
Home	Score	Away	Date and Time	Venue	Referee	Attendance
Swinton Lions	14 – 36	Doncaster	13 June, 19:30 BST	Leigh Sports Village	Chris Leatherbarrow
Sheffield Eagles	26 – 16	Dewsbury Rams	14 June, 20:00 BST	Don Valley Stadium	Matt Thomason	576
Batley Bulldogs	30 – 4	Workington Town	16 June, 14:00 BST	Loverugbyleague.com Stadium	George Stokes	671
Leigh Centurions	34 – 18	Whitehaven	16 June, 15:00 BST	Leigh Sports Village	Jamie Leahy	1,320

==== Semi-final ====
Home	Score	Away	Match Information
Home	Score	Away	Date and Time	Venue	Referee	Attendance
Leigh Centurions	23 – 6	Batley Bulldogs	27 June, 19:30 BST	Leigh Sports Village	Jamie Leahy	1,807
Doncaster	10 – 32	Sheffield Eagles	28 June, 20:00 BST	Doncaster Athletics Stadium	Chris Leatherbarrow	611

==== Finals ====
Home	Score	Away	Match Information
Home	Score	Away	Date and Time	Venue	Referee	Attendance
Northern Rail Cup
Leigh Centurions	43 – 28	Sheffield Eagles	20 July, 17:00 BST	The Shay, Halifax	Chris Leatherbarrow	4,179
Northern Rail Bowl
North Wales Crusaders	42 – 24	London Skolars	20 July, 14:30 BST	The Shay, Halifax	Joe Cobb	2,000

== Notes ==
A. Game switched from Thunderdome to Craven Park due to Stan Calvert Cup match between Northumbria University and Newcastle University
B. Game switched from Thunderdome to Blaydon RFC due to poor conditions of pitch at Gateshead
C. Match originally postponed on 24 March due to snow
