= 2009 RFL Championship =

- League: Championship
- Duration: 20 Rounds
- Teams: 11
- Attendance: 217,362 (average 1,874)

2009 Season
- Champions: Barrow Raiders
- League Leaders: Barrow Raiders
- Runners-up: Halifax
- Top try-scorer: (Scotland) James Nixon (26)

Promotion and relegation
- Relegated to Championship 1: Doncaster; Gateshead Thunder

The 2009 RFL Championship (known as the Co-operative Championship for sponsorship reasons) was the 1st season of the RFL Championship under its current name and the 42nd season under its current league status.

There was no automatic promotion to Super League due to licensing being used. Qualifying for the Grand Final is a prerequisite for Championship clubs to be able to apply for license in the next round of applications for the 2012–14 period.

The Grand Final was won by Barrow Raiders, who also won the League leaders Shield, beating Halifax 26-18.

Toulouse Olympique were exempt from relegation meaning Leigh Centurions were relegated along with bottom placed Doncaster. Following the completion of the season, Gateshead Thunder were eliminated following salary cap breaches and subsequently relegated, meaning Leigh Centurions retained their place in the Championship.

== Table ==
2009 Co-operative Championship
Pos	Team	Pld	W	D	L	PF	PA	PD	BP	Pts	Qualification
1	Barrow Raiders	20	13	0	7	632	361	+271	5	44	Qualified for the play-offs
2	Halifax	20	13	0	7	714	476	+238	4	43	Qualified for the play-offs
3	Sheffield Eagles	20	11	0	9	635	447	+188	9	42	Qualified for the play-offs
4	Widnes Vikings	20	11	0	9	649	438	+211	6	39	Qualified for the play-offs
5	Whitehaven	20	12	0	8	565	567	−2	3	39	Qualified for the play-offs
6	Featherstone Rovers	20	12	0	8	619	524	+95	1	37	Qualified for the play-offs
7	Gateshead Thunder	20	9	2	9	610	657	−47	3	32	
8	Batley Bulldogs	20	8	2	10	536	620	−84	6	32	
9	Leigh Centurions	20	9	0	11	426	572	−146	5	32	Relegated
10	Toulouse Olympique XIII	20	9	0	11	556	582	−26	3	30 (Note: Toulouse were exempt from relegation.)	
11	Doncaster	20	1	0	19	257	955	−698	−4	−1 (Note: Doncaster had 5 bonus points, but lost 9 competition points for entering administration.)	Relegated

Source: www.cooperativechampionship.co.uk and Rugby-League.com
Rules for classification: 1st on league points; 2nd on match points difference.

== Play-offs ==
=== Eliminators ===
Home	Score	Away	Match Information
Home	Score	Away	Date and Time	Venue	Referee	Attendance
Widnes Vikings	26 – 21	Whitehaven	10 September, 19:30 GMT	Stobart Stadium		2,375
Sheffield Eagles	8 – 32	Featherstone Rovers	11 September, 20:00 GMT	Don Valley Stadium		808

=== Semi finals ===
Home	Score	Away	Match Information
Home	Score	Away	Date and Time	Venue	Referee	Attendance
Barrow Raiders	35 – 12	Halifax	17 September, 19:30 GMT	Craven Park	Thierry Alibert	2823
Widnes Vikings	24 – 32	Featherstone Rovers	18 September, 20:00 GMT	Stobart Stadium	Ben Thaler	3,296

=== Elimination final ===
Home	Score	Away	Match Information
Home	Score	Away	Date and Time	Venue	Referee	Attendance
Halifax	36 – 30	Featherstone Rovers	24 September, 19:30 GMT	Shay Stadium	Ian Smith	2,556

=== Grand Final ===
Home	Score	Away	Match Information
Home	Score	Away	Date and Time	Venue	Referee	Attendance
Barrow Raiders	26 – 18	Halifax	4 October, 17:30	Halliwell Jones Stadium	P Bentham	11,398

=== Team bracket ===
Eliminators
4	Widnes Vikings	26
5	Whitehaven	21
3	Sheffield Eagles	8
6	Featherstone Rovers	32

Semi-finals
1	Barrow Raiders	35
2	Halifax	12
4	Widnes Vikings	24
6	Featherstone Rovers	32

Eliminator Final
2	Halifax	36
6	Featherstone Rovers	30

Grand Final
1	Barrow Raiders	26
2	Halifax	18

Source:Rugby League Project

== Statistics ==
The following are the top points scorers in the 2009 Championship season. Statistics include points scored in both league and play-off appearances.

Most tries

Player	Team	Tries
James Nixon	Barrow Raiders	26
Jermaine McGillvary	Batley Bulldogs	20
Shad Royston	Halifax	20
Gregg McNally	Whitehaven	19
Paddy Flynn	Widnes Vikings	18
Ian Hardman	Featherstone Rovers	16
Ben McAlpine	Gateshead Thunder	15
Nick Youngquest	Gateshead Thunder	15
Craig Calvert	Batley Bulldogs	15
Luke Branighan	Barrow Raiders	13
Rob Worrincy	Widnes Vikings	13

Most goals (excluding drop goals)

Player	Team	Goals
Lee Patterson	Halifax	106
Jonny Woodcock	Sheffield Eagles	85
Michael Knowles	Gateshead Thunder	84
Nathan Wynn	Toulouse Olympique	76
Stuart Dickens	Featherstone Rovers	65
Gregg McNally	Whitehaven	65
Ian Mort	Leigh Centurions	52
Paul Mennell	Batley Bulldogs	50
Jamie Rooney	Barrow Raiders	44
Tim Hartley	Widnes Vikings	42

== Attendances ==
	Team	Played	Highest	Lowest	Total	Average
1	Widnes Vikings	12	5,236	2,375	43,752	3,646
2	Halifax	11	3,274	2,002	25,812	2,347
3	Barrow Raiders	11	3,050	1,693	25,326	2,302
4	Toulouse Olympique	10	3,206	1,200	21,788	2,179
5	Leigh Centurions	10	2,721	1,394	19,843	1,984
6	Featherstone Rovers	10	2,673	1,346	18,084	1,808
7	Whitehaven	10	2,708	1,175	16,698	1,670
8	Sheffield Eagles	11	1,457	809	12,546	1,141
9	Batley Bulldogs	10	1,430	580	8,952	895
10	Doncaster	10	1,096	275	6,693	669
11	Gateshead Thunder	10	1,033	405	6,470	647
	Total	115	11,398	275	217,362	1,874

Rugby League Crowds - 2009 Co-operative Champs

== See also ==
- Co-operative Championship
- 2009 Championship 1
- British rugby league system
- Super League
- Rugby League Conference
- Northern Ford Premiership
- National League Cup

=== Team season articles ===
- 2009 Widnes Vikings season
- 2009 Toulouse Olympique season
- 2009 Whitehaven RLFC season
- 2009 Featherstone Rovers season
- 2009 Barrow Raiders season
