= Mark Lee (rugby league) =

Wales international rugby league footballer and coach

Personal information
- Full name: Mark Lee
- Born: 27 March 1968 (age 57)

Playing information
- Position: Scrum-half, Hooker, Second-row
Club
Years	Team	Pld	T	G	FG	P
1987–90	St Helens	7	0	0	1	1
1990–00	Salford City Reds	203	23	0	22	114
	Total	210	23	0	23	115

Coaching information
Club
Years	Team	Gms	W	D	L	W%
2003–04	Chorley Lynx
2004–05	Blackpool Panthers
	Total	0	0	0	0

Mark Lee (born 27 March 1968) is a former professional rugby league footballer who played in the 1980s, 1990s and 2000s. He played at club level for Blackbrook ARLFC (in St Helens, Merseyside), St. Helens and Salford City Reds as a scrum-half, hooker, or second-row, and coached at club level for Blackpool Panthers and Blackbrook ARLFC.

== Playing career ==
=== Salford ===
Lee signed for Salford in January 1990. He played hooker in Salford's 24–18 defeat by Widnes in the 1990 Lancashire Cup Final during the 1990–91 season at Central Park, Wigan on Saturday 29 September 1990.

== Coaching career ==
In 2003, Lee was appointed as head coach of Chorley Lynx. Following the demise of the club at the end of the 2004 season, Lee joined the newly-formed Blackpool Panthers along with many of the former Chorley players.

Sporting positions
Preceded by Club founded	Coach Blackpool Panthers; 2004-2005	Succeeded by Kevin Ashcroft; 2005
