= 2010 RFL Championship results =

This is a list of the 2010 Rugby Football League Championship. The RFL Championship is known as Co-operative Championship due to sponsorship by The Co-operative Group.

The Co-operative Championship is a semi-professional rugby league football competition played in the United Kingdom and France one tier below the first tier Super League. The two worst performing teams during the season, with the exception of Toulouse Olympique, will be relegated to Championship 1.

There is no automatic promotion from this league to Super League, which uses a licensing system renewed every three years. Qualifying for the Grand Final is a prerequisite for Championship clubs to be able to apply for license in the next round of applications for the 2012–14 period.

The 2010 Co-Operative Championship season will consist of two stages. The regular season is played over 22 round-robin fixtures, in which each of the eleven teams involved in the competition will play each other once at home and once away. In the 2010 Co-Operative Championship, a win is worth three points in the table, a draw is worth one two points apiece, and a loss by 12 points or fewer is worth 1 bonus point.

The league leaders at the end of the regular season will receive the league leaders trophy, but the Championship is decided through the second stage of the season via a playoffs system. The top six teams in the table will contest to play in the Grand Final, the winners of which are crowned 2010 Co-Operative Champions.

== Regular season ==
The 2010 season started on 25 February, when Leigh Centurions hosted the Barrow Raiders.

=== Round 1 ===
Home	Score	Away	Match Information				
Home	Score	Away	Date & Time	Referee	Venue	Attendance	RFL Match Report
Leigh Centurions	(12) 20 - 20 (6)	Barrow Raiders	25 February, 19:30 GMT	Gareth Hewer	Leigh Sports Village	2,203	Report
Toulouse Olympique XIII	(10) 26 - 22 (12)	Dewsbury Rams	27 February, 20:00 GMT	Peter Brook	Stade des Minimes	850	Report
Featherstone Rovers	(24) 36 - 10 (0)	Batley Bulldogs	28 February, 15:00 GMT		Big Fellas Stadium	1,353	Report
Halifax	(12) 32 - 26 (12)	Sheffield Eagles	28 February, 15:00 GMT	Jamie Leahy	Shay Stadium	2,139	Report
Widnes Vikings	(34) 72 - 10 (6)	Keighley Cougars	28 February, 15:00 GMT	Ron Laughton	Stobart Stadium Halton	2,777	Report
Round Stats
Agg Att:	9,322	Avg Att:	1,865	Pts Scored:	274	Avg Pts:	55
Highest Try Scorer(s):		Shane Grady (3) Dean Thompson (3); Shad Royston (3)		Highest Goal Scorer(s):		Shane Grady (10)	

=== Round 2 ===
Home	Score	Away	Match Information				
Home	Score	Away	Date & Time	Referee	Venue	Attendance	RFL Match Report
Batley Bulldogs	(6) 24 - 34 (30)	Halifax	11 March, 19:30 GMT	Ronnie Laughton	Mount Pleasant	1,837	Report
Whitehaven	(10) 34 - 20 (20)	Toulouse Olympique	13 March, 18:00 GMT	Jamie Leahy	Recreation Ground	1,181	Report
Dewsbury Rams	(6) 10 - 40 (22)	Featherstone Rovers	14 March, 15:00 GMT	Gareth Hewer	The Tetley's Stadium	1,313	Report
Keighley Cougars	(6) 12 - 34 (18)	Leigh Centurions	14 March, 15:00 GMT	Robert Hicks	Cougar Park	1,115	Report
Sheffield Eagles	(14) 30 - 44 (18)	Widnes Vikings	14 March, 15:00 GMT	Warren Turley	Don Valley Stadium	1,085	Report
Round Stats
Agg Att:	6,531	Avg Att:	1,306	Pts Scored:	282	Avg Pts:	56
Highest Try Scorer(s):		Andy Kain (3)		Highest Goal Scorer(s):		Shane Grady (8)	

=== Round 3 ===
Home	Score	Away	Match Information				
Home	Score	Away	Date & Time	Referee	Venue	Attendance	RFL Match Report
Widnes Vikings	(10) 28 - 30 (16)	Halifax	18 March, 19:30 GMT	Robert Hicks	Stobart Stadium Halton	3,686	Report
Sheffield Eagles	(12) 22 - 10 (10)	Dewsbury Rams	19 March, 19:30 GMT	Jamie Leahy	Don Valley Stadium	835	Report
Toulouse Olympique	(14) 34 - 26 (4)	Keighley Cougars	20 March, 19:00 GMT	Warren Turley	Stade des Minimes	1,823	Report
Barrow Raiders	(0) 6 - 20 (8)	Featherstone Rovers	20 March, 18:30 GMT	Ian Smith	Craven Park	1,998	Report
Leigh Centurions	(12) 44 - 12 (0)	Whitehaven	21 March, 15:00 GMT	P Brooke	Leigh Sports Village	1,891	Report
Round Stats
Agg Att:	10,233	Avg Att:	2,046	Pts Scored:	232	Avg Pts:	46
Highest Try Scorer(s):		Thomas Coyle (2) Tangi Ropati (2); Cédric Gay (2)		Highest Goal Scorer(s):		Kyle Briggs (6)	

=== Round 4 ===
Home	Score	Away	Match Information				
Home	Score	Away	Date & Time	Referee	Venue	Attendance	RFL Match Report
Keighley Cougars	(12) 12 - 22 (10)	Batley Bulldogs	25 March, 19:30 GMT	Jamie Leahy	Cougar Park	1,336	Report
Toulouse Olympique	(16) 16 - 48 (16)	Barrow Raiders	27 March, 19:00 GMT	Gareth Hewer	Stade des Minimes	1,500	Report
Dewsbury Rams	(14) 30 - 36 (16)	Widnes Vikings	28 March, 15:00 GMT	Ronnie Laughton	Tetley's Stadium	1,499	Report
Featherstone Rovers	(32) 54 - 18 (12)	Whitehaven	28 March, 15:00 GMT	Warren Turley	Big Fellas Stadium	1,551	Report
Halifax	(4) 10 - 48 (20)	Leigh Centurions	28 March, 15:00 GMT	M Thomason	Shay Stadium	3,071	Report
Round Stats
Agg Att:	8,957	Avg Att:	1,791	Pts Scored:	294	Avg Pts:	59
Highest Try Scorer(s):		Anthony Thackeray (3) Chris Spurr (3); Jessie Joe Parker (3); Kyle Briggs (3); Liam Campbell (3)		Highest Goal Scorer(s):		Kyle Briggs (7)	

=== Round 5 ===
Home	Score	Away	Match Information				
Home	Score	Away	Date & Time	Referee	Venue	Attendance	RFL Match Report
Whitehaven	(8) 8 - 19 (6)	Barrow Raiders	1 April, 18:00 GMT	Ian Smith	Recreation Ground	1,386	Report
Featherstone Rovers	(8) 44 - 4 (0)	Halifax	2 April, 19:30 GMT	Gareth Hewer	Big Fellas Stadium	2,353	Report
Keighley Cougars	(2) 16 - 16 (10)	Sheffield Eagles	2 April, 19:30 GMT	M Thomason	Cougar Park	927	
Batley Bulldogs	(10) 22 - 8 (4)	Dewsbury Rams	2 April, 19:30 GMT	Warren Turley	Mount Pleasant	1,484	
Toulouse Olympique	(0) 6 - 36 (18)	Leigh Centurions	2 April, 19:30 GMT	Craig Halloran	Stade des Minimes	1,225	Report
Round Stats
Agg Att:	7,375	Avg Att:	1,475	Pts Scored:	179	Avg Pts:	36
Highest Try Scorer(s):		Martin Ostler (2)		Highest Goal Scorer(s):		Kyle Briggs (8)	

=== Round 6 ===
Home	Score	Away	Match Information				
Home	Score	Away	Date & Time	Referee	Venue	Attendance	RFL Match Report
Dewsbury Rams	(4) 10 - 42 (14)	Keighley Cougars	5 April, 15:00 GMT	Craig Halloran	Tetley's Stadium	1,854	Report
Halifax	(16) 50 - 6 (6)	Toulouse Olympique	5 April, 18:00 GMT	Peter Brooke	Shay Stadium	1,725	Report
Leigh Centurions	(14) 26 - 4 (4)	Batley Bulldogs	5 April, 19:00 GMT	Gareth Hewer	Leigh Sports Village	2,246	Report
Widnes Vikings	(30) 48 - 18 (8)	Whitehaven	5 April, 15:00 GMT	Jamie Leahy	Stobart Stadium Halton	3,033	Report
Round Stats
Agg Att:	8,858	Avg Att:	2,215	Pts Scored:	204	Avg Pts:	51
Highest Try Scorer(s):		Matty Blythe (3); Shad Royston (3)		Highest Goal Scorer(s):		Jamie Rooney (7); Lee Patterson (7)	

=== Round 7 ===
Home	Score	Away	Match Information				
Home	Score	Away	Date & Time	Referee	Venue	Attendance	RFL Match Report
Halifax	(16) 40 - 20 (6)	Keighley Cougars	8 April, 19:30 GMT	Robert Hicks	The Shay	2,522	Report
Widnes Vikings	(12) 36 - 42 (30)	Toulouse Olympique	10 April, 18:00 GMT	M Thomason	Stobart Stadium Halton	2,793	Report
Barrow Raiders	(32) 56 - 10 (4)	Batley Bulldogs	10 April, 18:30 GMT	Craig Halloran	Craven Park	1,725	Report
Dewsbury Rams	(4) 12 - 20 (18)	Whitehaven	11 April, 15:00 GMT	P Brooke	Tetley's Stadium	850	Report
Sheffield Eagles	(6) 16 - 40 (16)	Featherstone Rovers	11 April, 15:00 GMT	Jamie Leahey	Bramall Lane	2,871	Report
Round Stats
Agg Att:	10,761	Avg Att:	2,152	Pts Scored:	292	Avg Pts:	58
Highest Try Scorer(s):		Jermaine McGilvary (3); Vincent Duport (3); Anthony Thackeray (3)		Highest Goal Scorer(s):		Jamie Rooney (8)	

=== Round 15 ===
Home	Score	Away	Match Information				
Home	Score	Away	Date & Time	Referee	Venue	Attendance	RFL Match Report
Barrow Raiders	(28) 50 - 4 (4)	Sheffield Eagles	5 April, 15:00 GMT	Ronnie Laughton	Craven Park	1,854	Report
Round Stats
Agg Att:	1,854	Avg Att:	1,854	Pts Scored:	54	Avg Pts:	54
Highest Try Scorer(s):				Highest Goal Scorer(s):			

== Progression table ==
- Cells in gold indicate team finished top of the table at the end of the round.
- Cells in green indicate team finished in the six play-off places at the end of the round.
- Cells in red indicate team finished in the relegation zone at the end of the round.
- Cells that contain a star (*) next to the points indicates that team did not play that week

#	Team	1	2	3	4	5	6	7
1	Featherstone Rovers	3	6	9	12	15	15*	18
2	Leigh Centurions	2	5	8	11	14	17	17*
3	Halifax	3	6	9	9	9	12	15
4	Barrow Raiders	2	2*	2	5	8	11	14
5	Widnes Vikings	3	6	7	10	10*	13	14
6	Toulouse Olympique	3	3	6	6	6	6	9
7	Batley Bulldogs	0	1	1*	4	7	7	7
8	Whitehaven	0*	3	3	3	4	4	7
9	Sheffield Eagles	1	1	4	4*	6	6	6
9	Dewsbury Rams	1	1	2	3	3	3	4
11	Keighley Cougars	-9	-9	-8	-7	-5	-2	-2
