= Cheltenham Rugby Festival =

English rugby league nines event

GRL Cheltenham Rugby Festival is a rugby league nines event held in Cheltenham, Gloucestershire. It is organised by the Gloucestershire County Rugby League in partnership with Cheltenham Borough Council and the Tourist Board.

It will take place on Friday 2 May at the Prince of Wales stadium in Cheltenham. The event is intended to dovetail with the Rugby Football League’s Millennium Magic event in Cardiff on the weekend of 3–4 May.

It comprises two main elements: the All Golds Cup and the 1908 Cup.

== All Golds Cup ==
The All Golds Cup is the festival’s main event. This is a rugby league nines event for eight senior teams.

The Cup is named in honour of the famous New Zealand team that defeated England at Cheltenham’s Athletic Ground on 15 February 1908 to win the first international rugby league series.

- 2008 The British Army
- 2009 The Royal Air Force
- 2010 Warrington Wolves

== Shield ==
- 2010 Featherstone Rovers

== Plate ==
- 2010 British Army

=== William "Massa" Johnston Award ===
This is awarded to the player of the tournament and is named in honour of the New Zealand forward who scored the winning try for the All Golds in the last minutes of the game to secure an 8 - 5 victory.

- 2008 Rob Smart (British Army)
- 2010 Rhys Evans (Warrington)

== 1908 Cup ==
This is a rugby league nines event for eight local schools at year 8.

The 1908 Cup commemorates the year of the All Golds match.

- 2008 Archway School, Stroud

=== 1908 Plate ===
- 2008 Winchcombe School

=== Arthur Smith Award ===
The Arthur Smith Award is presented to the player of the tournament and is named in honour of the Gloucestershire rugby player who joined Oldham and represented England. He played in the All Golds test in Cheltenham in 1908.

- 2008 Billy Chick (Pittville School)

=== 2009 Competition ===
The 2009 event took place on Friday 24 April 2009 at Newlands Park, With the Royal Navy winning the event. The winners of the event will qualify to play in the 2009 Carnegie Floodlit Nines
