= Northern Rail Nines =

2009 one-off rugby league nines tournament

The Northern Rail Nines was a one-off rugby league nines tournament held in Lytham St Annes and Blackpool, England as part of a celebration weekend encompassing the Northern Rail Cup Final.

Held over the weekend of 11 and 12 July 2009, it was won by Blackpool Panthers with Halifax winning the Plate final.

The tournament was staged at Woodlands Memorial Ground, Lytham St Annes, the home of Blackpool Panthers with the final at Bloomfield Road, Blackpool.

The event was supported by the Northwest Regional Development Agency (NWDA), complementing a three-year £3.5million funding package to support a programme of signature events in Blackpool announced by the NWDA in June 2007. Every English Co-operative Championship and Championship 1 sides not involved in the 2009 Northern Rail Cup Final entered full strength sides into the tournament.

The first day of the competition will saw all eighteen clubs playing in group stages, with the top eight sides going forward to a straight knock-out competition on the Sunday for the Northern Rail Nine's trophy. Meanwhile the ten remaining sides also competed on the Sunday in a competition to win the Northern Rail Nine's plate.

The finals of both the Northern Rail Nine's trophy and plate were played as curtain raisers to the 13-a-side Northern Rail Cup Final at Bloomfield Road on 12 July.

The winners of the competition were awarded a place in the Carnegie Floodlit Nines.

== Group stages ==
The teams were divided into five groups on Saturday. The top two teams in group's A, B and C progressed to the Northern Rail Nines Trophy competition whilst the bottom two entered the Plate competition. Each team in Pool D played each team in Pool E with the top side from each group qualifying for the Trophy competition and the remaining teams contesting the Plate.

Group A

- Swinton Lions
- Rochdale Hornets
- Blackpool Panthers
- Dewsbury Rams

Group B

- Batley Bulldogs
- Keighley Cougars
- Hunslet Hawks
- Doncaster

Group C

- London Skolars
- Leigh Centurions
- Gateshead Thunder
- York City Knights

Group D

- Whitehaven
- Workington Town
- Featherstone Rovers

Group E

- Oldham R.L.F.C.
- Sheffield Eagles
- Halifax

=== Group A ===
Rank	Team	Pld	W	D	L	F	A	D	Points
1	Dewsbury Rams	3	3	0	0	76	40	36	9
2	Blackpool Panthers	3	2	0	1	58	44	14	6
3	Swinton Lions	3	1	0	2	34	52	-18	3
4	Rochdale Hornets	3	0	0	3	26	68	-44	0

- Blackpool Panthers 20–8 Rochdale Hornets
- Dewsbury Rams 22–4 Swinton Lions
- Blackpool Panthers 26–10 Swinton Lions
- Dewsbury Rams 28–14 Rochdale Hornets
- Rochdale Hornets 4–20 Swinton Lions
- Blackpool Panthers 12–26 Dewsbury Rams

=== Group B ===
Rank	Team	Pld	W	D	L	F	A	D	Points
1	Hunslet Hawks	3	3	0	0	48	18	30	9
2	Batley Bulldogs	3	2	0	1	52	22	30	6
3	Doncaster	3	1	0	2	34	60	-26	3
4	Keighley Cougars	3	0	0	3	28	60	-32	0

- Batley Bulldogs 24–6 Doncaster
- Hunslet Hawks 16–6 Keighley Cougars
- Batley Bulldogs 22–10 Keighley Cougars
- Hunslet Hawks 24–6 Doncaster
- Batley Bulldogs 6–8 Hunslet Hawks
- Doncaster 22–12 Keighley Cougars

=== Group C ===
Rank	Team	Pld	W	D	L	F	A	D	Points
1	York City Knights	3	3	0	0	62	30	32	9
2	Leigh Centurions	3	2	0	1	50	26	24	6
3	Gateshead Thunder	3	1	0	2	42	56	-14	3
4	London Skolars	3	0	0	3	30	70	-40	0

- Leigh Centurions 22–0 London Skolars
- Gateshead Thunder 10–20 York City Knights
- Gateshead Thunder 10–20 Leigh Centurions
- London Skolars 14–26 York City Knights
- Gateshead Thunder 22–16 London Skolars
- Leigh Centurions 6–16 York City Knights

=== Groups D & E ===
Group D

Rank	Team	Pld	W	D	L	F	A	D	Points
1	Featherstone Rovers	3	2	1	0	48	36	12	7
2	Whitehaven	3	1	0	2	36	54	-18	3
3	Workington Town	3	0	0	3	26	70	-44	0

Group E

Rank	Team	Pld	W	D	L	F	A	D	Points
1	Sheffield Eagles	3	2	1	0	72	40	32	7
2	Halifax	3	2	0	1	54	30	24	6
3	Oldham R.L.F.C.	3	1	0	2	44	50	-6	3

- Featherstone Rovers 16–8 Halifax
- Oldham 4–16 Whitehaven
- Sheffield Eagles 26–8 Workington Town
- Sheffield 24–10 Whitehaven
- Featherstone Rovers 20–16 Oldham
- Halifax 20–4 Workington
- Halifax 26–10 Whitehaven
- Featherstone Rovers 22–22 Sheffield Eagles
- Oldham 24–14 Workington Town

== Plate ==
- Qualifying round

12 July 2009

Workington Town	10–26	Rochdale Hornets

Woodlands Memorial Ground, Lytham St Annes

12 July 2009

London Skolars	4–26	Keighley Cougars

Woodlands Memorial Ground, Lytham St Annes

- Quarter-finals

12 July 2009

Swinton Lions	17–16	Whitehaven

Woodlands Memorial Ground, Lytham St Annes

12 July 2009

Gateshead Thunder	32–0	Doncaster

Woodlands Memorial Ground, Lytham St Annes

12 July 2009

Oldham R.L.F.C.	8–26	Rochdale Hornets

Woodlands Memorial Ground, Lytham St Annes

12 July 2009

Halifax	20–10	Keighley Cougars

Woodlands Memorial Ground, Lytham St Annes

- Semi-finals

12 July 2009

Swinton Lions	18–40	Halifax

Woodlands Memorial Ground, Lytham St Annes

12 July 2009

Gateshead Thunder	36–30	Rochdale Hornets

Woodlands Memorial Ground, Lytham St Annes

- Plate final

12 July 2009

Halifax	24–20	Gateshead Thunder

Bloomfield Road, Blackpool

== Trophy ==
- Quarter-finals

12 July 2009

Dewsbury Rams	18–14	Batley Bulldogs

Woodlands Memorial Ground, Lytham St Annes

12 July 2009

Hunslet Hawks	12–28	Blackpool Panthers

Woodlands Memorial Ground, Lytham St Annes

12 July 2009

Featherstone Rovers	32–4	York City Knights

Woodlands Memorial Ground, Lytham St Annes

12 July 2009

Sheffield Eagles	50–10	Leigh Centurions

Woodlands Memorial Ground, Lytham St Annes

- Semi-finals

12 July 2009

Featherstone Rovers	14–20	Sheffield Eagles

Woodlands Memorial Ground, Lytham St Annes

12 July 2009

Dewsbury Rams	8–10	Blackpool Panthers

Woodlands Memorial Ground, Lytham St Annes

- Trophy final

12 July 2009

Blackpool Panthers	14–10	Sheffield Eagles

Bloomfield Road, Blackpool

== Winners ==
=== Trophy ===
- 2009 Blackpool Panthers 14–10 Sheffield Eagles
- 2010 Halifax 16–4 Sheffield Eagles

=== Plate ===
- 2009 Halifax 24–20 Gateshead Thunder

== See also ==
- Northern Rail Cup
