= 2007 National League Two =

- League: National League Two
- Duration: 22 games each
- Teams: 12

2007 Season
- Champions: Celtic Crusaders
- Play-off winners: Featherstone Rovers
- Runners-up: Featherstone Rovers

Promotion and relegation
- Promoted from Championship: Celtic Crusaders; Featherstone Rovers

2007 National League Two was a semi-professional rugby league football competition played in the United Kingdom, the third tier of the sport in the country. The winner of this league and the play-off winner were promoted to National League One. There was no relegation from this league as it was the lowest tier of professional rugby league in the UK.

Celtic Crusaders won the title to earn automatic promotion following second-placed Featherstone's loss to Barrow in the final round of the regular season. A month later, Featherstone were promoted too when they defeated Oldham 24–6 in the play-off final.

== Results ==
=== Table ===
Pos	Team	Pld	W	D	L	PF	PA	PD	BP	Pts	Qualification
1	Celtic Crusaders	22	19	0	3	918	345	+573	3	60	Promoted to 2008 National League One
2	Featherstone Rovers	22	18	0	4	819	366	+453	2	56	Play-off semi-finals
3	Barrow Raiders	22	17	0	5	769	387	+382	4	55	Play-off semi-finals
4	Oldham	22	16	0	6	661	420	+241	5	53	Play-off eliminators
5	Workington Town	22	12	0	10	655	515	+140	7	43	Play-off eliminators
6	Swinton Lions	22	11	0	11	605	649	−44	6	39	Play-off eliminators
7	York City Knights	22	10	0	12	488	470	+18	6	36	Play-off eliminators
8	Hunslet Hawks	22	8	0	14	368	591	−223	7	31	
9	London Skolars	22	8	1	13	448	610	−162	4	29	
10	Keighley Cougars	22	6	1	15	407	692	−285	4	23	
11	Gateshead Thunder	22	6	0	16	381	822	−441	3	21	
12	Blackpool Panthers	22	0	0	22	332	984	−652	6	6	

=== Play-offs ===
Elimination play-offs
16 September 2007
4	Oldham	36
6	Swinton Lions	6
16 September 2007
5	Workington Town	42
7	York City Knights	4

Qualifying / Elimination semifinal
23 September 2007
2	Featherstone Rovers	36
3	Barrow Raiders	20
23 September 2007
Oldham	48
Workington Town	0

Elimination final
30 September 2007
Barrow Raiders	6
Oldham	28

Grand Final
7 October 2007
Featherstone Rovers	24
Oldham	6

== See also ==
- Rugby League Championships
