= Michael Knowles (rugby league) =

English rugby league footballer

Mike Knowles
Personal information
- Full name: Michael Knowles
- Born: 2 May 1987 (age 39)
- Height: 6 ft 4 in (1.93 m)
- Weight: 14 st 7 lb (92 kg)

Playing information
- Position: Second-row, Loose forward, Prop
Club
Years	Team	Pld	T	G	FG	P
2005–07	Castleford Tigers	15	4	0	0	16
2009	Gateshead Thunder	28	9	101	0	238
2010–11	Barrow Raiders	51	17	9	0	86
2012–16	Sheffield Eagles	142	42	35	3	241
2017	Featherstone Rovers	14	1	22	0	48
2017–22	Dewsbury Rams	28	5	0	0	20
2023–24	Hunslet RLFC	0	0	0	0	0
2025	Hunslet RLFC	1	0	0	0	0
	Total	279	78	167	3	649

Michael Knowles (born 2 May 1987) is a former professional rugby league player who played as a second-row. He is the current Assistant Coach of Hunslet RLFC in the Betfred Championship.

Knowles has one first-grade honour to his name from when he played for Castleford. He played in round 25 of 2006's Super League XI, here he came off the bench in a 48-10 loss away to Bradford. After being released by Featherstone he signed for Dewsbury in July 2017 on a deal lasting until the end of the 2018 season.
