= 2008 National League Two =

- League: National League Two
- Duration: 22 games each
- Teams: 12

2008 Season
- Playoff Winners: Doncaster
- Champions: Gateshead Thunder
- Runners-up: Barrow Raiders

2008 National League Two was a semi-professional rugby league football competition played in the United Kingdom, the third tier of the sport in the country. The top two teams of this league and the winner of the play-offs were promoted to renamed Championship (formerly National League 1). There is no relegation from this league as it is the lowest tier of professional rugby league in the UK.

The competition used the points system introduced by the Rugby Football League ahead of the 2007 season in which teams earned three points for a win, two for a draw, and one bonus point for a loss by 12 points or less. Gateshead Thunder were champions and were promoted along with Barrow Raiders, who finished second, and Doncaster who won in the play-offs.

== Results ==
=== Table ===
Pos	Team	Pld	W	D	L	BP	PF	PA	PD	Pts	Qualification
1	Gateshead Thunder (C, P)	22	19	0	3	2	767	415	352	59	Promoted to 2009 RFL Championship
2	Barrow Raiders (P)	22	16	0	6	4	703	375	328	52	Promoted to 2009 RFL Championship
3	Oldham	22	17	0	5	1	716	456	260	52	Play-off semi-finals
4	Doncaster (P)	22	15	0	7	3	672	426	246	48	Play-off semi-finals
5	Keighley Cougars	22	15	0	7	3	611	519	92	48	Play-off eliminators
6	York City Knights	22	11	1	10	7	740	540	200	42	Play-off eliminators
7	Rochdale Hornets	22	10	1	11	4	715	610	105	36	Play-off eliminators
8	Workington Town	22	6	0	16	10	512	628	−116	28	Play-off eliminators
9	Blackpool Panthers	22	7	1	14	2	472	828	−356	25	
10	Swinton Lions	22	6	0	16	4	482	777	−295	22	
11	London Skolars	22	4	1	17	6	449	823	−374	20	
12	Hunslet Hawks	22	4	0	18	5	336	778	−442	17	

Source: National Leagues
(C) Champion; (P) Promoted

=== Playoffs ===
Eliminators
5	Keighley Cougars	32
8	Workington	14
6	York City Knights	12
7	Rochdale Hornets	28

Semi-finals
3	Oldham	20
4	Doncaster	32
5	Keighley Cougars	26
6	Rochdale Hornets	32

Eliminator Final
3	Oldham	38
7	Rochdale Hornets	14

Grand Final
3	Oldham	10
4	Doncaster	18

Source:RFL, RFL
