= Championship Cup =

Rugby league football competition

- Sport: Rugby league
- Instituted: 2002
- Ceased: 2013
- Replaced by: 1895 Cup
- Number of teams: 26
- Country: England (RFL)
- Holders: Leigh Centurions
- Most titles: Leigh Centurions (4 titles)
- Broadcast partner: Premier Sports

The Championship Cup (known as the Northern Rail Cup for sponsorship reasons), previously known as the National League Cup, was a rugby league football competition for clubs in the United Kingdom's Rugby League Championships. Although the French club Toulouse Olympique competed in the Championship from 2009 through 2011, they never participated in the cup until 2012 after they had left the Championship. The Cup's last season was 2013, after which it was replaced by the 1895 Cup.

== History ==
The Trans-Pennine Cup was a short-lived competition for professional British rugby league clubs outside Super League. It was played for during the period in which all non-Super League professional clubs were grouped into a single competition, the Northern Ford Premiership.

As part of the redevelopment of the Northern Ford Premiership competition; the National League cup was first held in 2002. It was known as the Buddies Cup, after its sponsor, a soft drinks manufacturer. Eighteen teams took part divided into three groups of six (East, West and Central).

The Northern Ford Premiership was replaced by National Leagues One and Two in 2003. The competition was known as the Arriva Trains Cup after sponsor Arriva Trains Northern). The twenty National League teams were divided into four groups (North, East, West and Central) of five teams each, while in 2004 there were five groups (North, East, West, Pennine, Yorkshire) of four teams each.

Northern Rail became the competition's sponsor in 2005 and the name Northern Rail Cup was adopted. Four teams from the then National League Three also entered the competition. There were no cross-group games in the 2005 competition; each team therefore played only six games in the group stages, with the top team from each of the first five groups progressing to the quarter-final directly. The second-placed team in each of these groups, plus the top team from group six (the group of teams from National League 3) played an additional round to determine the remaining three spots in the quarter-finals.

For 2006 there were seven groups. Groups one to six comprised the 22 teams in National Leagues One and Two and the two southern National League Three teams, Hemel Stags and St Albans Centurions. There were four teams in each regional division. The top two teams from groups one to six and the best three third-placed teams qualified for the last sixteen knock out stage along with the winner of group seven. Group seven comprised northern National League Three teams that choose to enter, and included three teams: Bramley Buffaloes, Warrington Wizards and Dewsbury Celtic.

In 2007, it was announced that the competition would adopt a new points system: Win – three points; Draw – two points; Loss by 12 points or fewer – one point. However, in the group tables only one point was given for a draw.

In 2009, the Northern Rail Nines tournament was started. Teams not involved in the Northern Rail Cup Final entered a rugby league nines event with the trophy and plate final played as curtain raisers to the Northern Rail Cup Final at Bloomfield Road, Blackpool.

== Venues ==
	City	Stadium	Years
1	(England) Featherstone	Post Office Road	2002
2	(England) Rochdale	Spotland Stadium	2003–2004
3	(England) Blackpool	Bloomfield Road	2005–2012
4	(England) Halifax	The Shay	2013

== Results ==
Year	Winner	Score	Runner up	Attendance
2002	Huddersfield Giants	32–6	Hull Kingston Rovers	4,352
2003	Salford City Reds	36–19	Leigh Centurions	6,486
2004	Leigh Centurions	42–14	Hull Kingston Rovers	4,383
2005	Hull Kingston Rovers	18–16	Castleford Tigers	9,400
2006	Leigh Centurions	22–18	Hull Kingston Rovers	7,547
2007	Widnes Vikings	54–6	Whitehaven	8,326
2008	Salford City Reds	60–0	Doncaster	6,328
2009	Widnes Vikings	34–18	Barrow Raiders	8,720
2010	Batley Bulldogs	25–24	Widnes Vikings	8,138
2011	Leigh Centurions	20–16	Halifax	8,822
2012	Halifax	21–12	Featherstone Rovers	6,691
2013	Leigh Centurions	43–28	Sheffield Eagles	4,179

=== Winners ===
Club	Winners	Runners-up	Winning years
Leigh Centurions	4	1	2004, 2006, 2011, 2013
Widnes Vikings	2	1	2007, 2009
Salford City Reds	2	0	2003, 2008
Hull Kingston Rovers	1	3	2005
Halifax	1	1	2012
Huddersfield Giants	1	0	2002
Batley Bulldogs	1	0	2010

== Championship Bowl ==
Year	Winner	Score	Runner Up
2013	North Wales Crusaders	42–24	London Skolars

== Sponsors ==
Years	Sponsor	Name
2002	Buddies	Buddies Cup
2003–2004	Arriva Trains Northern	Arriva Trains Cup
2005–2013	Northern Rail	Northern Rail Cup

== Records ==
Below is a list of National League Cup records.

Most tries

- 5 Paul Salmon (Barrow Raiders) vs Workington Town 2002
- 5 Neil Turley (Leigh Centurions) vs Swinton Lions 2003
- 5 Neil Turley (Leigh Centurions) vs Chorley Lynx 2004
- 5 Jon Steel (Hull Kingston Rovers) vs London Skolars 2005
- 5 Byron Ford (Hull Kingston Rovers) vs York City Knights 2006

Most goals

- Gareth Moore (Batley Bulldogs) vs Gateshead Thunder 2010

Most goals in a final

- 10 John Wilshere (Salford City Reds) vs Doncaster 2008 equaling the all-time record for goals kicked in any final

Most points

- 42 (5 tries, 11 goals) Neil Turley (Leigh Centurions) at Chorley Lynx 2004

Highest score

- Gateshead Thunder 4 vs 100 Batley Bulldogs – 2010

Highest away score

- Gateshead Thunder 4 vs 100 Batley Bulldogs – 2010

Closest score

- Batley Bulldogs 25 vs Widnes Vikings 24 – 2010

Most Final appearances (Club)

- Leigh Centurions have contested 5 Championship Cup Finals.

Most Competition Wins (Club)

- Leigh Centurions have won 4 Championship Cup Finals, from 5 final appearances.

== Broadcasting rights ==
Sky Sports broadcast a limited number of Championship Cup matches. In 2012 the rights passed to Premier Sports. Setanta Sports Australia broadcast live Northern Rail Cup matches in Australia.

== See also ==
- Co-operative Championship
- Northern Rail Nines
- RFL League 1
- Rugby Football League Championship Second Division
- Rugby League Challenge Cup
- Trans-Pennine Cup
