= 2009 Championship 1 =

- Championship 1 logo
- League: Championship 1
- Duration: 18 games each
- Teams: 10
- Total attendance: 71,166 (average 791)

2009 Season
- Playoff Winners: Keighley Cougars
- Champions: Dewsbury Rams
- Runners-up: Keighley Cougars

2009 Championship 1 was a semi-professional rugby league football competition played in the United Kingdom, the third tier of the sport in the country. The winner of this league will be promoted to the Co-operative Championship. There is no relegation from this league as it is the lowest tier of professional rugby league in the UK.

== 2009 Structure ==
Championship 1
Team	2008 Season	Stadium	Capacity	City/Area
Blackpool Panthers	9th	Woodlands Memorial Ground	9,000	Lytham St Annes, Lancashire
Dewsbury Rams	11th (National League One)	Crown Flatt	5,100	Dewsbury, West Yorkshire
Hunslet Hawks	12th	South Leeds Stadium	4,000	Leeds, West Yorkshire
Keighley Cougars	5th	Cougar Park	7,800	Keighley, West Yorkshire
London Skolars	11th	New River Stadium	5,000	Haringey, London
Oldham	3rd	Boundary Park	10,368	Oldham, Greater Manchester
Rochdale Hornets	7th	Spotland Stadium	10,249	Rochdale, Greater Manchester
Swinton Lions	10th	Park Lane	3,000	Swinton, Greater Manchester
Workington Town	8th	Derwent Park	10,000	Workington, Cumbria
York City Knights	6th	Huntington Stadium	3,428	York, North Yorkshire

The Dewsbury Rams were easily the best team throughout the regular season. They won all their games and finished on top of the table, 12 points ahead of the second placed Keighley Cougars. The Rochdale Hornets were stripped of six competition points for going into administration and had to be reformed by local fans .

== Table ==
Three points were awarded for a win, one point for a draw. Bonus points were awarded (one point per game) to losing teams where the margin of defeat was 13 points or less.

Position	Club	Played	Won	Drawn	Lost	Pts for	Pts agst	Pts diff	B.P.	Points
1	Dewsbury Rams	18	18	0	0	760	233	537	0	54
2	Keighley Cougars	18	13	0	5	539	415	124	3	42
3	York City Knights	18	12	0	6	589	360	229	4	40
4	Oldham R.L.F.C.	18	10	1	7	618	449	169	4	35
5	Blackpool Panthers	18	9	1	8	565	456	76	5	33
6	Hunslet Hawks	18	10	0	8	472	411	61	3	33
7	Swinton Lions	18	8	0	10	513	516	−3	3	27
8	Rochdale Hornets	18	6	0	12	500	557	−57	6	15(a)
9	Workington Town	18	2	0	16	281	700	−419	5	11
10	London Skolars	18	1	0	17	210	927	−717	2	5

a: Rochdale were docked 9 points for going into administration.

== Play-offs ==
Championship 1 uses a top 6 play-off system.

=== Elimination semi-finals ===
Home	Score	Away	Match information
Home	Score	Away	Date and time	Venue	Referee	Attendance
Blackpool Panthers	18–21	Hunslet Hawks	13 September, 15:00 GMT	Woodlands Memorial Ground	Craig Halloran	543
Oldham R.L.F.C.	31–26	Swinton Lions	13 September, 15:00 GMT	Boundary Park	Matthew Thomasson	745

=== Qualification and elimination matches ===
Home	Score	Away	Match information
Home	Score	Away	Date and time	Venue	Referee	Attendance
Keighley Cougars	32–18	York City Knights	20 September, 15:00 GMT	Cougar Park	Ronnie Laughton	1,501
Oldham R.L.F.C.	54–30	Hunslet Hawks	20 September, 15:00 GMT	Boundary Park	Jamie Leahy	801

=== Final qualifiers ===
Home	Score	Away	Match information
Home	Score	Away	Date and time	Venue	Referee	Attendance
York City Knights	14–44	Oldham R.L.F.C.	27 September, 15:00 GMT	Huntington Stadium	Phil Bentham	1,164

=== Grand Final ===
Home	Score	Away	Match information
Home	Score	Away	Date and time	Venue	Referee	Attendance
Keighley Cougars	28–26	Oldham R.L.F.C.	4 October, 15:05 GMT	Halliwell Jones Stadium	Ronnie Laughton	11,398

== 2009 Attendances ==
	Team	Played	Highest	Lowest	Total	Average
1	Dewsbury Rams	9	2,103	912	11,381	1,265
2	York City Knights	10	3,106	629	11,469	1,147
3	Keighley Cougars	10	1,726	534	9,898	989
4	Oldham R.L.F.C.	11	1,419	745	10,710	974
5	Rochdale Hornets	9	1,249	480	6,139	682
6	Hunslet Hawks	9	1019	412	5,747	639
7	Blackpool Panthers	8	975	280	4,139	517
8	Swinton Lions	9	705	369	4,610	512
9	Workington Town	6	693	353	3070	512
10	London Skolars	9	1,156	215	4003	445
	Total	90	11,398	215	82,564	907

– Crowd figures could not be found for all games. – The final will be played at a neutral venue and thus will not be included in the averages of any team.

== See also ==
- Co-operative Championship
- 2009 Co-operative Championship
- RFL League 1
