= Woodlands Memorial Ground =

Rugby stadium in Lytham St Annes, England

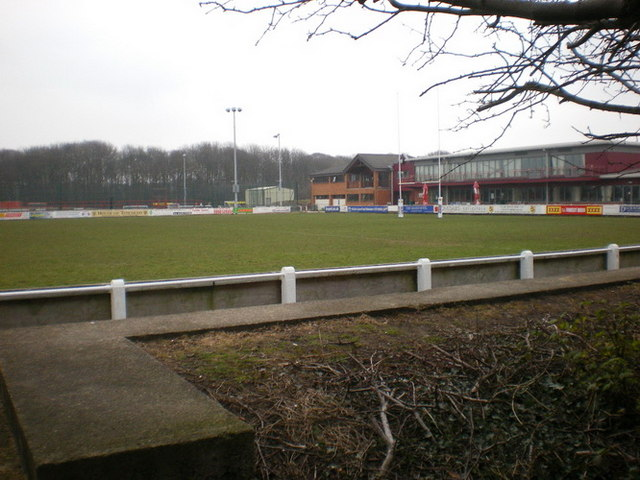
- Interactive map of Woodlands Memorial Ground
- Full name: Woodlands Memorial Ground
- Location: Lytham St Annes, Lancashire, England
- Coordinates: 53°44′42″N 2°59′17″W
- Capacity: 7,500 (500 seats)
- Surface: Grass

Construction
- Built: 1919
- Opened: 1920

Tenants
- Fylde Rugby Club (1920-); Blackpool Panthers (2006-2010)

Woodlands Memorial Ground is a rugby stadium in Lytham St Annes, Lancashire, England. It is the home of Fylde Rugby Club and was the home of the Blackpool Panthers between 2006 and 2010.

The Northern Rail Nines group matches, quarter and semi finals were held at the ground in July 2009, with the finals taking place at Bloomfield Road, Blackpool.

An official capacity figure provided by the club in 1990 was that the Woodlands could hold a total of 7,500 spectators – 7,000 standing and 500 seated - with relatively little changed since then. Other estimates had the ground capacity being 9,000 but this seems high by modern safety standards.

== History ==
Fylde Rugby Club was founded in 1919 and first used the Woodlands for rugby union in May 1920.

During the Second World War, the Army took over the ground. In 1946, the President, G.W. Parkes, welcomed back members from the forces, and the ground was purchased for £7,000. It was named the Woodlands Memorial Ground in recognition of those members who gave their lives during World War II.

In the 1950s, the dressing rooms were erected.

In 1964, the second England trial was held at Fylde, and Sir Laurie Edwards opened the new pavilion extension.

In 1970, the North West Counties played the Fijian Tourists at the Woodlands attracting a record gate of 7,600.

Fylde Rugby Club ran up significant debts in trying to compete in National One in 1997-9 and had to sell a small portion of the Woodlands grounds to re-establish financial health. With the receipts of the sale, a period of redevelopment of facilities of all kinds at the Woodlands began in January 2005. The new clubhouse opened in October 2005 and houses 500 people.

In June and July, Blackpool Panthers played three rugby league games at Woodlands while Bloomfield Road was being reseeded. The Blackpool Panthers beat Keighley Cougars and Workington Town and lost to Gateshead Thunder.

In October 2006, a contract was signed between the Blackpool Panthers and Fylde R.F.C. for an initial period of six years, covering the seasons 2007–2012. The administrative and commercial base of the Blackpool Panthers, as well as the National League games, moved to the Woodlands Memorial Ground.

International rugby union returned to the ground in February 2015 when the England Counties XV played the Scotland Club XV for the first time.

== See also ==
- List of English rugby league stadiums by capacity
