= Blackpool Panthers =

Defunct English rugby league club

Club information
- Full name: Blackpool West Coast Panthers; Rugby League Football Club
- Founded: 2004; 22 years ago
- Exited: 2010; 16 years ago

Former details
- Ground: Woodlands Memorial Ground, Lytham St Annes (7,500 (500 seats))
- Chairman: Bobby Hope
- Coach: Martin Crompton
- Competition: Championship 1
- 2009: 5th

Uniforms
Home colours	Away colours

Blackpool Panthers RLFC was an English professional rugby league club based in Lytham St Annes, Lancashire. They played at Bloomfield Road, between 2005 and 2007, then moved to the Woodlands Memorial Ground owned by Fylde rugby union club. They were members of the Rugby Football League from 2005 to 2010.

== History ==
The club was founded as Blackpool West Coast Panthers in 2004 for the 2005 season, and took the place of Chorley Lynx, which had folded. Sixteen of Chorley's squad and Chorley coach Mark Lee joined the Panthers. Blackpool agreed an initial two-year tenancy of Bloomfield Road, the home of Blackpool F.C. and they were elected to National League Two for the 2005 season. The original chairman quit before the season started leaving Dave Rowland in charge. Coach Mark Lee was sacked before the start of the season and appointed former Great Britain international Kevin Ashcroft as Team Manager on a 12-month contract. The Panthers struggled on the field finishing second bottom of National League Two with only managing three wins all season, against Sheffield Eagles, Gateshead Thunder and London Skolars. Overall the Panthers failed to make an impact on the Blackpool public, with attendances averaging 400.

In September 2005 Dave Rowland, who had resigned from the board of directors but remained the clubs majority shareholder, put forward a proposal to relocate the Panthers to Preston where they would ground share with Preston Grasshoppers rugby union club. However, the board bought out former major shareholder Dave Rowland's stake in the club and a last minute deal saw them secure the use of Bloomfield Road at a reduced rent. And at a public meeting held at Bloomfield Road in October 2005, former chairman of Leeds Rhinos, Alf Davies warned the club and its fans that it could take up to five years to establish the club in the resort. Davies who had been appointed by the Rugby Football League to help the new Panthers' board of directors revitalise the club said, ""It will be a hell of a struggle and it will take five years before you can say you are established in rugby league, but if directors hold their nerve it can be done." The club also confirmed that they were working on a plan to develop links with local schools.

The 2006 season was again a difficult one for Blackpool as they finished bottom of National League Two, winning only four games. In June and July three games were played at Fylde Rugby Union Club's Woodlands Memorial Ground in Lytham St Annes as Bloomfield Road was being reseeded. The Panthers beat Keighley Cougars and Workington Town but lost to Gateshead Thunder. In October 2006 a contract was signed to move to Woodlands Memorial Ground for an initial period of six years, covering the seasons from 2007 to 2012. The club's administrative and commercial base also moved to Woodlands, with Panthers' Chairman, John Chadwick, saying, "We're looking for stability and a base from which we can establish the Panthers as a successful national league club operating from the Fylde Coast. The set-up at the ground is first rate.

Andy Gregory took control of the Panthers in June 2007 when they were bottom of National League Two and had not won for 25 matches. However, Gregory resigned after the club finished the entire season without managing a single win, becoming only the fourth professional sports club to have suffered that fate in the United Kingdom. Former Ireland international, Martin Crompton was appointed as coach at the end of the 2007 season. The club finally ended their losing streak, which had lasted two years and 45 matches, on 6 April 2008, when they beat Workington Town 24–20. They had not won a match since beating Gateshead Thunder 38–36 on 15 July 2006, with the run being made up of 32 National League Two matches, 12 Northern Rail Cup matches and two Carnegie Challenge Cup matches. It was the club's first win under coach Martin Crompton. In May 2008 they won back-to-back matches for only the second time in the club's history, beating Hunslet Hawks and then a week later, seventh-placed Swinton Lions 30–28 prompting Martin Crompton to target the league play-offs saying after the Swinton victory, "The play-offs have always been the goal. That victory was a fantastic achievement against a quality team. Everyone is playing with confidence now.

On 12 July 2009 the Panthers won their first trophy, when they won the inaugural Northern Rail Nines beating Sheffield Eagles 14–10 in the final at Bloomfield Road. The Panthers went on to finish fifth in Championship 1 in 2009, only to lose in the first round of the play-offs.

After the 2009 season, Bobby Hope replaced John Chadwick as club chairman and set the Panthers' sights high for the 2010 campaign, vowing to win the Championship 1 league title. The Panthers finished the season in the play-offs but went into administration in October and had their membership of the RFL cancelled having failed to provide the RFL a financial plan for the upcoming season, and therefore took no part in the 2011 Co-operative Championship.

== Past coaches ==
- Mark Lee 2004-05
- Kevin Ashcroft 2005
- Simon Knox 2005-07
- Andy Gregory 2007
- Martin Crompton 2008-10

== Seasons ==
Season	League										Challenge Cup
Season	Division	P	W	D	L	F	A	Pts	Pos	Play-offs	Challenge Cup
2005	National League Two	18	3	0	15	356	623	6	9th	Did not qualify	R3
2006	National League Two	22	4	1	17	350	853	9	12th	Did not qualify	R3
2007	National League Two	22	0	0	22	332	984	6	12th	Did not qualify	R3
2008	National League Two	22	7	1	14	472	828	25	9th	Did not qualify	R3
2009	Championship 1	18	9	1	8	565	456	33	5th	Lost in elimination playoffs	R3
2010	Championship 1	20	15	0	5	805	370	38	4th	Lost in preliminary final	R5

== Honours ==
- Northern Rail Nines winners: 2009

== See also ==
- Rugby Football League expansion
- Blackpool Borough
- List of defunct rugby league clubs
