= RFL League One =

British rugby league

League One
- Sport: Rugby league
- Founded: 2003; 23 years ago (as National League 2); 2009; 17 years ago as (Championship 1); 2015; 11 years ago (as League 1); 2022; 4 years ago (as League One)
- Folded: 2025 (merged with Betfred Championship)
- No. of teams: 10
- Country: England; Wales; France; Canada
- Last champion: North Wales Crusaders (2nd title)
- Most titles: Dewsbury Rams (3 titles)
- Level on pyramid: 3
- Promotion to: Championship
- Domestic cups: Challenge Cup; 1895 Cup
- Website: League One

The Rugby Football League's League One (known as the Betfred League One) was the third-highest division of rugby league in Britain. It was also the lowest level of professional rugby league in Britain.

Introduced in 2003 as National League 2 it was the first time British rugby league had a third tier since the old Third and Second Divisions merged in 1998. The league was rebranded as Championship 1 in 2009, then League 1 in 2015, and League One in 2022.

The league was disbanded at the conclusion of 2025 due to the merger of the Championship and League One for the 2026 season.

== History ==
=== 1991–2003: Foundation and regular competition ===
Third-division rugby league competitions in the United Kingdom have existed periodically since 1991. The current incarnation was created in 2003 when the second-division competition below Super League, the Northern Ford Premiership, was split into National Leagues One and Two. Teams that finished in the top ten league positions of the Northern Ford Premiership at the end of the 2002 season formed National League One, while the remaining eight formed National League Two where they were joined by two additional clubs, London Skolars from the Rugby League Conference and York City Knights, who replaced the defunct York Wasps and also joined National League Two for the inaugural season in 2003.

=== 2004–2009: National Leagues ===
At the end of the 2005 Super League season, an extra team was relegated to National League One in order to accommodate French side Catalans Dragons' entry to the competition. In turn, an additional team was relegated from National League One to League Two, while Blackpool Panthers were elected to National League Two for the 2005 season to replace the defunct Chorley Lynx, leaving 11 teams in League Two. In order to even up the numbers, the Welsh team Celtic Crusaders were admitted to the competition in 2005, first playing in the 2006 season and increasing the division to twelve teams.

=== 2010–2014: Championship 1 ===
In 2009 Super League was expanded to 14 teams, with two additional teams being promoted from National League One. In turn, two additional teams were promoted from National League Two to National League One at the end of the 2008 season, reducing the number of teams in National League Two to 10. National Leagues One and Two were then rebranded as Championship and Championship 1 respectively, with the change being implemented in time for the 2009 season.

South Wales Scorpions were admitted to Championship 1 for the 2010 season, increasing the number of teams in the league to 11. Blackpool Panthers left the league in 2011, once again reducing the number of teams to 10. In 2013, three new teams were admitted to the league; Hemel Stags, Gloucestershire All Golds and Oxford Rugby League. To facilitate this expansion, in 2012 four teams were promoted to the Championship from Championship 1 and no teams were relegated from the Championship, meaning that the 2013 Championship 1 season was contested by 9 teams.

=== 2015–2025: League 1 ===
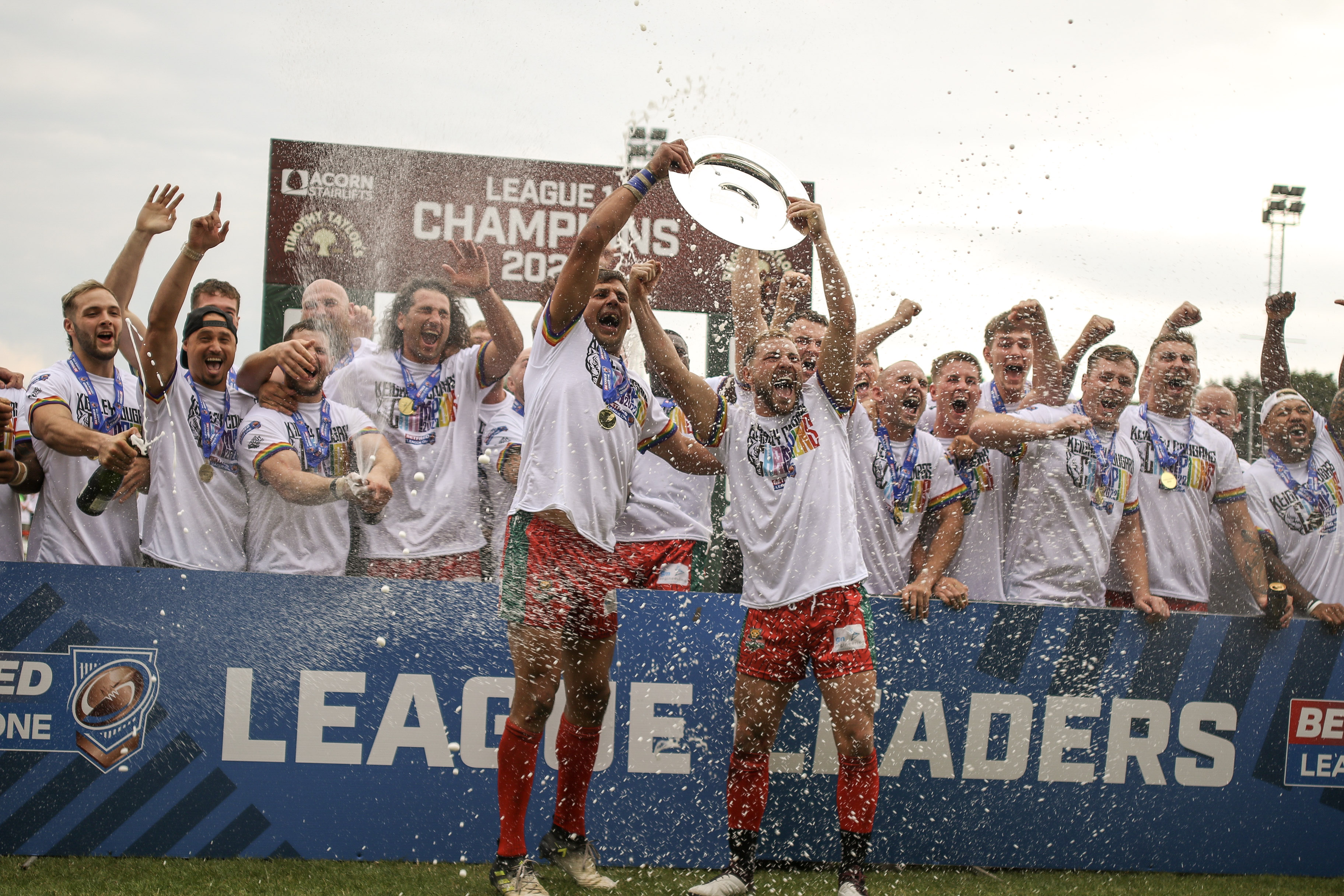
Keighley Cougars celebrating winning the competition in 2022

In 2014 expansion and restructure took place with 5 teams relegated from the Championship and Coventry Bears added to expand the league to 14 teams, which was then renamed League 1. A new playoff structure was also introduced with two teams being promoted to the Championship. In 2015 the League 1 Cup was introduced as an additional competition for League 1 clubs. In 2016 Toulouse Olympique joined the league, bringing the total number of teams to 15. Toronto Wolfpack joined the league in 2017, bringing the total number of teams to 16.

In 2016, the Super 8s format that had been used in the Super League and Championship was introduced to League 1.

Under the amended structure, the 16 League 1 clubs played a regular season of 15 rounds, playing each other once either home or away. Following the conclusion of their regular league seasons, the 16 clubs then compete in a playoff series where they split into 2 divisions of 8 based upon league position:

- The top eight League 1 clubs compete in the League 1 Super 8s. They play each other once (either home or away) to determine the champion and the four clubs that will compete in the playoffs for the second promotion place.
- The remaining clubs compete for the League 1 Shield.

This format remained in use for the 2017 season but on 26 October 2017, it was confirmed that Oxford Rugby League and Gloucestershire All Golds would not compete for the 2018 season, in favour of creating a merged club in Bristol for 2019. This reduced the number of clubs to 14 and for 2018 the Super 8 format has been discarded and instead the teams will play a 26-game season; with home and away fixtures against all the other teams. The club top of the table after 26 games will automatically be promoted to the Championship and those finishing second to fifth will play off for the other promotion spot.

The format was modified for 2019 following an RFL extraordinary general meeting in September 2018. The number of clubs in the division was reduced to 12 and the top six teams competed for two promotion places to the Championship. However, on 23 October 2018, Hemel Stags announced that the club was withdrawing from the league for 2019 reducing the number of teams to 11; the RFL indicated that no replacement team was to be sought. The team finishing top of the 11-team league after the 20-game regular season was automatically be promoted then a series of six further matches will decide the second promotion spot.

Following the aborted 2020 season, the number of clubs was reduced to 10 as Newcastle Thunder were appointed to the Championship and the planned entry of Ottawa Aces was deferred to 2022. Over the close season of 2021–2022 Ottawa Aces decided to relocate to Cornwall and Cornwall R.L.F.C. became the division's eleventh team for 2022.

A reduction to ten teams happened for 2023 as West Wales Raiders withdrew from the league in December 2022.

Further reductions to the number of teams initially saw the league go from ten to eight teams for the 2024 season, following London Skolars withdrawal from the league in September 2023 and Newcastle Thunders' withdrawal in October 2023. However the league was restored to nine when Newcastle were re-admitted in December 2023. The addition of Goole Vikings for the start of the 2025 season brought the league back to ten teams. The league did reduce to nine teams as Cornwall RLFC withdrew from the league with immediate effect midseason.

== Clubs ==
In the 22 years of the league, 29 different clubs played in the league at some point.

Name	Count	Seasons
Barrow Raiders	11	2003–2004, 2006–2008, 2012, 2015–2017, 2020–2021
Blackpool Panthers §	6	2005–2010
Bradford Bulls	1	2018
Celtic Crusaders §	2	2006–2007
Chorley Lynx §	2	2003–2004
Cornwall §	4	2022–25
Dewsbury Rams	6	2004–2006, 2009, 2023, 2025
Doncaster	12	2008, 2010–2012, 2016–2023
Featherstone Rovers	2	2006–2007
Gloucestershire All Golds	5	2013–2017
Goole Vikings	1	2025
Hemel Stags	6	2013–2018
Hunslet	18	2003–2010, 2014, 2016–2024
Keighley Cougars	17	2003, 2005–2009, 2011, 2015–2022, 2024–2025
London Skolars	21	2002–2023
Midlands Hurricanes (as Coventry Bears 1998–2021)	11	2015–2025
Newcastle Thunder (as Gateshead Thunder 1999–2014)	13	2003–2008, 2010–2020, 2024–2025
North Wales Crusaders	13	2012–2013, 2015–2025
Oldham	14	2007–2015, 2018–2019, 2022–2024
Oxford §	5	2013–2017
Rochdale Hornets	14	2008–2013, 2015–2016, 2020–2025
Sheffield Eagles	4	2003–2006
Swinton Lions	12	2003–2011, 2015, 2022, 2025
Toronto Wolfpack	1	2017
Toulouse Olympique	1	2016
West Wales Raiders § (as South Wales Scorpions 2010–2016 and South Wales Ironmen 2017)	13	2010–22
Whitehaven	6	2011–2012, 2017–2019, 2025
Workington Town	18	2003–2012, 2017–2021, 2023–2025
York Knights (as York City Knights)	12	2003–2005, 2007–2010, 2014–2018

== Structure ==
Teams play each other once home and away in a round robin system. There is no relegation from League 1. At the end of the season the team finishing first was promoted to the Championship. Various systems have been used to decide the second team to promote, the most recent system – in use between 2019 and 2024 – is for the teams finishing between 2nd and 6th compete in a playoff competition to decide the second promotion spot.

In the play-offs first round there are two matches; the Elimination Final (EF) between the clubs finishing fifth and sixth, and the Qualifying Final (QF) between the clubs finishing third and fourth. For the losing team of the Elimination Final the season is over but the other three play in the semi-finals of the play-offs. In the semi-finals the 1st semi-final was between the winning team in the EF and the losing team in the QF; while the 2nd semi-final was between the team who finished second in the regular season (and had a bye in the first round of the play-offs) and the winning team of the QF. The team winning the 2nd semi-final had home advantage in the Grand Final while the losing team had home advantage in the Preliminary Final. The team losing the 1st semi-final were out of the competition while the winning team played the team losing the 2nd semi-final in the Preliminary Final. The winner of the Preliminary Final played the winner of the 2nd semi-final in the League 1 Grand Final where the victorious team took the second promotion spot to the Championship.

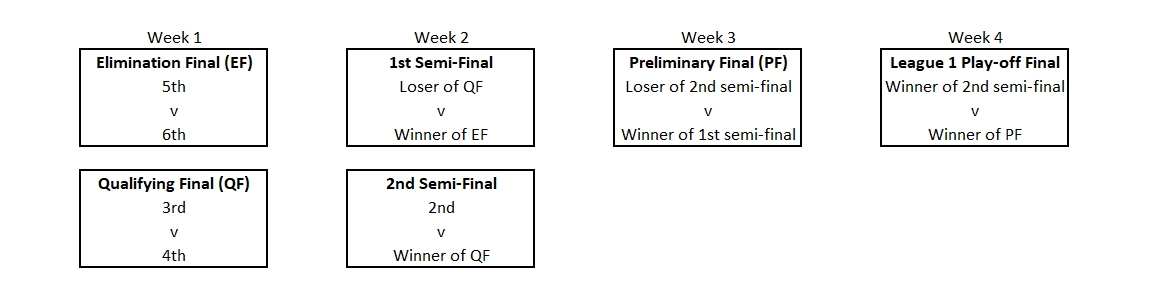
Play-off structure 2019 to 2024

== Results ==
Year	Champions	Also Promoted	Bottom place
2003	Keighley	none	London Skolars
2004	Barrow	none	Newcastle
2005	York	none	Blackpool
2006	Dewsbury	Sheffield	Blackpool
2007	Crusaders	Featherstone	Blackpool
2008	Newcastle	Barrow; Doncaster	Hunslet
2009	Dewsbury	Keighley	London Skolars
2010	Hunslet	York	Newcastle
2011	Swinton	Keighley	Newcastle
2012	Doncaster	Barrow; Whitehaven; Workington	Newcastle
2013	North Wales	Rochdale	Gloucestershire
2014	Hunslet	none	South Wales
2015	Oldham	Swinton	South Wales
2016	Rochdale	Toulouse	Hemel
2017	Toronto	Barrow	Hemel
2018	York	Bradford	West Wales
2019	Whitehaven	Oldham	West Wales
2020	Season cancelled due to the COVID-19 pandemic. Newcastle elevated to Championship		
2021	Barrow	Workington	West Wales
2022	Keighley	Swinton	West Wales
2023	Dewsbury	Doncaster	London Skolars
2024	Oldham	Hunslet	Newcastle
2025	North Wales	Championship & League One merged	Newcastle

=== Winners ===
	Club	Wins	Winning years
1	Dewsbury Rams	3	2006, 2009, 2023
2	Hunslet	2	2010, 2014
3	York Knights	2	2005, 2018
4	Barrow Raiders	2	2004, 2021
5	Keighley Cougars	2	2003, 2022
6	Oldham	2	2015, 2024
7	North Wales Crusaders	2	2013, 2025
8	Celtic Crusaders	1	2007
9	Newcastle Thunder	1	2008
10	Swinton Lions	1	2011
11	Doncaster	1	2012
12	Rochdale Hornets	1	2016
13	Toronto Wolfpack	1	2017
14	Whitehaven	1	2019

== Match officials ==
All rugby league matches are governed by the laws set out by the RFL; these laws are enforced by match officials.

== Sponsor ==
League One had four different sponsors since 2003.

The official rugby ball supplier was Steeden.

Period	Sponsor	Name
2003–2008	Nuffield	LHF Healthplan National League 2
2009–2012	Co-operative	Co-operative Championship 1
2013–2014	Kingstone Press Cider	Kingstone Press Championship 1
2015–2017	Kingstone Press Cider	Kingstone Press League 1
2018–2021	Betfred	Betfred League 1
2022–2025	Betfred	Betfred League One

== Expansion ==
RFL policy was to add expansion teams to the professional structure via entry to League One. In 2011, the RFL invited expressions of interest for four additional British teams to join the competition starting in 2013. Of the 16 interested parties, three teams, University of Gloucestershire All Golds, Hemel Stags and Oxford Rugby League were accepted to join the league and began play in 2013, a fourth, the Northampton Town F.C.-linked Northampton Rebels were also accepted, but ultimately decided not to proceed. An additional team, Coventry Bears (now the Midlands Hurricanes), were also accepted in September 2012, however it was decided that they would join from the 2014 season to give them additional time to prepare. Coventry again deferred their membership in 2014, eventually joining the league for the 2015 season.

In 2015 it was announced that Toulouse Olympique, after talks with the RFL, had accepted the proposal to rejoin the English league structure in League 1 for the 2016 season, airing their aims for promotion in their maiden League 1 season in a bid to eventually achieve Super League status. They currently play in the Championship, having earned promotion at their first opportunity in 2016.

In 2016, it was announced that Toronto Wolfpack would be joining the league from the 2017 season, becoming the first team to compete in the RFL structure from outside of the UK or France. The Wolfpack won the League 1 title in their inaugural season and went on to play in the Super League.

In October 2017 it was announced that Gloucestershire All Golds and Oxford would withdraw from the league, merge and relocate the new club to Bristol with the intention of rejoining the league for the 2019 season, however this did not eventuate and in 2019 the All Golds entered the relaunched Conference League South. In addition Hemel Stags announced their withdrawal from League 1 at the end of the 2018 season in order to rejoin the Conference League South. In March 2019 it was announced that Hemel's RFL membership had been bought by a consortium including Toronto Wolfpack founder Eric Perez, with the intention of relocating the club to Ottawa, Canada. The club would ultimately be based in Cornwall and be called Cornwall R.L.F.C. A bid to establish a team in New York was also formally considered by the RFL in March 2019. There were also expressions of interest in joining the RFL system from Spain and Serbia through Valencia Huracanes and Red Star Belgrade RL.

== Media ==
=== TV ===
League 1 games have been televised only rarely and sporadically. Before the 2017 season, new members of the league, Toronto Wolfpack, announced that their games would be shown live on Canadian channel GameTV, as well as digitally on CBC Sports.

Period	Broadcaster
2008–2011	Sky Sports; Premier Sports
2012–2013	Premier Sports
2014	Sky Sports (Grand Final Only)

== See also ==
- British rugby league system
- Super League
- National Conference League
- Northern Ford Premiership
- National League Cup
- Rugby Football League Championship Third Division
