= 2011 RFL Championship results =

These are the season results for the 2011 RFL Championship.

== Season results ==
=== Round 1 ===
Home	Score	Away	Match Information
Home	Score	Away	Date and Time	Venue	Referee	Attendance
Leigh Centurions	36–10	Featherstone Rovers	10 March, 19:30 GMT	Leigh Sports Village^{A}		1,940
Toulouse Olympique	26–12	Halifax	12 March, 19:00 GMT	Arnaune Stadium		1,200
Sheffield Eagles	16–44	Widnes Vikings	13 March, 15:00 GMT	Bramall Lane		1,831
Hunslet Hawks	28–28	York City Knights	13 March, 15:00 GMT	South Leeds Stadium		606
Batley Bulldogs	28–0	Dewsbury Rams	13 March, 15:00 GMT	Mount Pleasant		1,402

=== Round 2 ===
Home	Score	Away	Match Information
Home	Score	Away	Date and Time	Venue	Referee	Attendance
York City Knights	10–28	Sheffield Eagles	17 March, 19:30 GMT	Huntington Stadium^{A}		2,022
Dewsbury Rams	35–6	Toulouse Olympique	19 March, 18:00 GMT	Tetley's Stadium		928
Barrow Raiders	32–36	Leigh Centurions	19 March, 17:30 GMT	The Furness Heating Components Stadium		1,799
Widnes Vikings	10–18	Hunslet Hawks	20 March, 15:00 GMT	Stobart Stadium Halton		3,023
Featherstone Rovers	36–6	Batley Bulldogs	20 March, 15:00 GMT	Big Fellas Stadium		1,786

=== Round 3 ===
Home	Score	Away	Match Information
Home	Score	Away	Date and Time	Venue	Referee	Attendance
Halifax	20–32	Featherstone Rovers	24 March, 19:30 GMT	The Shay^{A}		2,638
Sheffield Eagles	34–16	Toulouse Olympique	26 March, 15:00 GMT	Bramall Lane		1,076
Batley Bulldogs	38–12	Hunslet Hawks	27 March, 15:00 GMT	Mount Pleasant		940
Leigh Centurions	54–16	Widnes Vikings	27 March, 15:00 GMT	Leigh Sports Village		3,198
York City Knights	16–42	Barrow Raiders	27 March, 15:00 GMT	Huntington Stadium		1,064

=== Round 4 ===
Home	Score	Away	Match Information
Home	Score	Away	Date and Time	Venue	Referee	Attendance
Hunslet Hawks	4–22	Dewsbury Rams	31 March, 19:30 GMT	South Leeds Stadium^{A}		1,190
Barrow Raiders	22–30	Batley Bulldogs	2 April, 17:30 GMT	The Furness Heating Components Stadium		1,741
Toulouse Olympique	18–56	Featherstone Rovers	2 April, 19:00 GMT	Arnaune Stadium		2,000
Sheffield Eagles	41–22	Halifax	3 April, 15:00 GMT	Bramall Lane		1,280
Widnes Vikings	76–12	York City Knights	3 April, 15:00 GMT	Stobart Stadium Halton		4,087

=== Round 5 ===
Home	Score	Away	Match Information
Home	Score	Away	Date and Time	Venue	Referee	Attendance
Hunslet Hawks	28–6	Toulouse Olympique	17 April, 13:00 GMT	South Leeds Stadium^{A}		518
Batley Bulldogs	32–12	Widnes Vikings	17 April, 15:00 GMT	Mount Pleasant		1,101
Dewsbury Rams	12–36	Sheffield Eagles	17 April, 15:00 GMT	Tetley's Stadium		1,010
Halifax	22–32	Leigh Centurions	17 April, 15:00 GMT	The Shay		2,479

=== Round 6 ===
Home	Score	Away	Match Information
Home	Score	Away	Date and Time	Venue	Referee	Attendance
Dewsbury Rams	20–36	Batley Bulldogs	21 April, 18:00 GMT	Tetley's Stadium^{A}		1,184
Widnes Vikings	47–36	Halifax	21 April, 19:30 GMT	Stobart Stadium Halton		3,669
Leigh Centurions	26–24	Barrow Raiders	22 April, 12:00 GMT	Leigh Sports Village		2,583
York City Knights	12–50	Hunslet Hawks	22 April, 14:00 GMT	Huntington Stadium		1,036

=== Round 7 ===
Home	Score	Away	Match Information
Home	Score	Away	Date and Time	Venue	Referee	Attendance
Barrow Raiders	30–12	Widnes Vikings	25 April, 15:00 GMT	The Furness Heating Components Stadium^{A}		1,965
Batley Bulldogs	16–28	Sheffield Eagles	25 April, 15:00 GMT	Mount Pleasant		843
Featherstone Rovers	28–28	Leigh Centurions	25 April, 16:00 GMT	Big Fellas Stadium		2,375
Toulouse Olympique	10–16	York City Knights	25 April, 18:00 GMT	Arnaune Stadium		650
Halifax	56–24	Dewsbury Rams	25 April, 15:00 GMT	The Shay		1,745

=== Round 8 ===
Home	Score	Away	Match Information
Home	Score	Away	Date and Time	Venue	Referee	Attendance
Widnes Vikings	26–12	Toulouse Olympique	28 April, 19:30 GMT	Stobart Stadium Halton^{A}
Halifax	25–43	Barrow Raiders	1 May, 15:00 GMT	The Shay
Hunslet Hawks	12–50	Featherstone Rovers	1 May, 15:00 GMT	South Leeds Stadium
Leigh Centurions	36–12	Batley Bulldogs	1 May, 15:00 GMT	Leigh Sports Village
York City Knights	30–26	Dewsbury Rams	1 May, 15:00 GMT	Huntington Stadium

=== Round 9 ===
Home	Score	Away	Match Information
Home	Score	Away	Date and Time	Venue	Referee	Attendance
Barrow Raiders	34–12	York City Knights	14 May, 18:30 GMT	The Furness Heating Components Stadium^{A}
Toulouse Olympique	28–6	Hunslet Hawks	14 May, 19:00 GMT	Arnaune Stadium
Sheffield Eagles	8–44	Leigh Centurions	15 May, 17:05 GMT	Bramall Lane
Dewsbury Rams	34–34	Widnes Vikings	15 May, 15:00 GMT	Tetley's Stadium
Featherstone Rovers	30–18	Halifax	15 May, 15:00 GMT	Big Fellas Stadium

=== Round 10 ===
Home	Score	Away	Match Information
Home	Score	Away	Date and Time	Venue	Referee	Attendance
Batley Bulldogs	50–16	York City Knights	19 May, 19:30 GMT	Mount Pleasant^{A}
Featherstone Rovers	0–0	Widnes Vikings	21 May, 18:00 GMT	Big Fellas Stadium
Barrow Raiders	18–14	Dewsbury Rams	21 May, 18:30 GMT	The Furness Heating Components Stadium
Halifax	14–12	Sheffield Eagles	22 May, 15:00 GMT	The Shay
Leigh Centurions	56–18	Hunslet Hawks	22 May, 15:00 GMT	Leigh Sports Village
