= 2011 Championship 1 =

- League: Championship 1
- Duration: 18 games each
- Teams: 10
- Broadcast partners: SKY Sports

2011 Season
- Play-off Winners: Keighley Cougars
- Champions: Swinton Lions
- Top point-scorer: Ian Mort (292)
- Top try-scorer: Ian Mort (21)

The 2011 Championship 1 was a semi-professional rugby league football competition played in England and Wales, the third tier of the sport in the country. The winner of this league, along with the play-off winners will be promoted to the 2012 Rugby Football League Championship. There is no relegation from this league as it is the lowest tier of professional rugby league.

All of the teams competed in the 2011 Challenge Cup but the South Wales Scorpions did not compete in the 2011 National League Cup.

== 2011 structure ==
The competition features mainly the same teams as it did in 2010. The exceptions being that the Hunslet Hawks and the York City Knights were both promoted to compete in the 2011 RFL Championship. The Keighley Cougars and Whitehaven were relegated from the 2010 RFL Championship. The competition was to contain 11 teams, however, the Blackpool Panthers went into administration and were thus omitted from the competition for 2011.

Championship 1
| Team | 2010 Season | Stadium | Capacity | City/Area |
|---|---|---|---|---|
| Doncaster | 9th | Keepmoat Stadium | 15,231 | Doncaster, South Yorkshire |
| Gateshead Thunder | 11th | Thunderdome | 11,800 | Gateshead, Tyne and Wear |
| Keighley Cougars | 10th (Championship) | Cougar Park | 6,800 | Keighley, West Yorkshire |
| London Skolars | 10th | New River Stadium | 5,000 | Haringey, London |
| Oldham | 2nd | Whitebank Stadium | 1500 | Limeside, Oldham Greater Manchester |
| Rochdale Hornets | 5th | Spotland Stadium | 10,249 | Rochdale, Greater Manchester |
| South Wales Scorpions | 6th | The Gnoll | 6,000 | Neath, West Glamorgan, Wales |
| Swinton Lions | 8th | The Willows (Shared with Salford for this season) | N/A | Swinton, Greater Manchester |
| Whitehaven | 11th (Championship) | Recreation Ground | 7,500 | Whitehaven, Cumbria |
| Workington Town | 7th | Derwent Park | 10,000 | Workington, Cumbria |

== Season table ==
2011 Championship 1
| # | Team | Pld | W | D | L | PF | PA | PD | Bns | Pts |
|---|---|---|---|---|---|---|---|---|---|---|
| 1 | Swinton Lions | 20 | 14 | 1 | 5 | 720 | 479 | +241 | 3 | 47 |
| 2 | Keighley Cougars | 20 | 13 | 0 | 7 | 663 | 412 | +251 | 4 | 43 |
| 3 | Workington Town | 20 | 11 | 1 | 8 | 659 | 443 | +216 | 6 | 41 |
| 4 | Rochdale Hornets | 20 | 12 | 0 | 8 | 652 | 498 | +154 | 4 | 40 |
| 5 | Doncaster | 20 | 12 | 0 | 8 | 531 | 433 | +98 | 4 | 40 |
| 6 | Whitehaven | 20 | 13 | 2 | 5 | 566 | 425 | +141 | 2 | 36 (Note: Whitehaven were deducted 9 points for entering administration.) |
| 7 | Oldham | 20 | 11 | 0 | 9 | 641 | 533 | +108 | 3 | 36 |
| 8 | South Wales Scorpions | 20 | 6 | 0 | 14 | 536 | 674 | −138 | 4 | 22 |
| 9 | London Skolars | 20 | 5 | 1 | 14 | 433 | 678 | −245 | 4 | 21 |
| 10 | Gateshead Thunder | 20 | 0 | 1 | 19 | 268 | 1094 | −826 | 0 | 2 |

| Teams qualifying for promotion |
| Teams qualifying for the Play-offs |

updated 7 October 2011

Source: https://web.archive.org/web/20111005000040/http://www.cooperativechampionship.co.uk/table_nl2.php

Competition points: For win = 3; For draw = 2; For loss by 12 points or fewer = 1.

== Season Results ==
=== Round 1 ===
| Home | Score | Away | Match Information | | |
| Home | Score | Away | Date and time | Venue | Attendance |
|---|---|---|---|---|---|
| Whitehaven | 30–22 | Rochdale Hornets | 13 March, 15:00 GMT | Recreation Ground^{A} | 704 |
| Swinton Lions | 22–10 | Workington Town | 13 March, 15:00 GMT | The Willows | 681 |
| Oldham R.L.F.C. | 66–12 | Gateshead Thunder | 13 March, 15:00 GMT | Whitebank Stadium | 562 |
| Keighley Cougars | 66–6 | London Skolars | 13 March, 15:00 GMT | Cougar Park | 640 |
| Doncaster | 40–10 | South Wales Scorpions | 13 March, 15:00 GMT | Keepmoat Stadium | 895 |

=== Round 2 ===
| Home | Score | Away | Match Information | | |
| Home | Score | Away | Date and time | Venue | Attendance |
|---|---|---|---|---|---|
| Workington Town | 31–12 | Oldham R.L.F.C. | 20 March, 15:00 GMT | Derwent Park^{A} | 473 |
| South Wales Scorpions | 18–22 | Whitehaven | 20 March, 13:00 GMT | The Gnoll | 271 |
| Rochdale Hornets | 26–46 | Swinton Lions | 20 March, 15:00 GMT | Spotland Stadium | 743 |
| London Skolars | 22–42 | Doncaster | 20 March, 15:00 GMT | New River Stadium | 326 |
| Gateshead Thunder | 10–44 | Keighley Cougars | 20 March, 15:00 GMT | Gateshead International Stadium | 305 |

=== Round 3 ===
| Home | Score | Away | Match Information | | |
| Home | Score | Away | Date and time | Venue | Attendance |
|---|---|---|---|---|---|
| Whitehaven | 24–10 | Keighley Cougars | 27 March, 15:00 GMT | Recreation Ground^{A} | 754 |
| South Wales Scorpions | 60–20 | Gateshead Thunder | 27 March, 13:00 GMT | The Gnoll | 302 |
| Rochdale Hornets | 40–20 | London Skolars | 27 March, 15:00 GMT | Spotland Stadium | 434 |
| Oldham R.L.F.C. | 24–68 | Swinton Lions | 27 March, 15:00 GMT | Whitebank Stadium | 744 |
| Doncaster | 26–16 | Workington Town | 27 March, 15:00 GMT | Keepmoat Stadium | 493 |

=== Round 4 ===
| Home | Score | Away | Match Information | | |
| Home | Score | Away | Date and time | Venue | Attendance |
|---|---|---|---|---|---|
| Workington Town | 38–24 | South Wales Scorpions | 3 April, 13:00 GMT | Derwent Park^{A} | 376 |
| Swinton Lions | 48–24 | Gateshead Thunder | 3 April, 15:00 GMT | The Willows | 493 |
| London Skolars | 16–48 | Whitehaven | 3 April, 15:00 GMT | New River Stadium | 542 |
| Keighley Cougars | 40–14 | Oldham R.L.F.C. | 3 April, 15:00 GMT | Cougar Park | 995 |
| Doncaster | 8–24 | Rochdale Hornets | 3 April, 15:00 GMT | Keepmoat Stadium | 589 |

=== Round 5 ===
| Home | Score | Away | Match Information | | |
| Home | Score | Away | Date and time | Venue | Attendance |
|---|---|---|---|---|---|
| Swinton Lions | 38–30 | London Skolars | 9 April, 17:00 GMT | The Willows^{A} | 395 |
| Rochdale Hornets | 49–18 | Whitehaven | 10 April, 15:00 GMT | Spotland Stadium^{A} | 457 |

=== Round 6 ===
| Home | Score | Away | Match Information | | |
| Home | Score | Away | Date and time | Venue | Attendance |
|---|---|---|---|---|---|
| Whitehaven | 26–16 | Doncaster | 17 April, 15:00 GMT | Recreation Ground^{A} | 727 |
| South Wales Scorpions | 22–74 | Swinton Lions | 17 April, 15:00 GMT | The Gnoll | 370 |
| Rochdale Hornets | 32–40 | Keighley Cougars | 17 April, 15:00 GMT | Spotland Stadium | 515 |
| Oldham R.L.F.C. | 52–26 | London Skolars | 17 April, 15:00 GMT | Whitebank Stadium | 566 |
| Gateshead Thunder | 0–64 | Workington Town | 17 April, 15:00 GMT | Gateshead International Stadium | 273 |

=== Round 7 ===
| Home | Score | Away | Match Information | | |
| Home | Score | Away | Date and time | Venue | Attendance |
|---|---|---|---|---|---|
| Doncaster | 32–36 | Swinton Lions | 25 April, 15:00 GMT | Keepmoat Stadium^{A} | 649 |
| Keighley Cougars | 38–18 | Workington Town | 25 April, 15:00 GMT | Cougar Park | 892 |
| London Skolars | 32–32 | Gateshead Thunder | 25 April, 14:00 GMT | New River Stadium | 263 |
| Rochdale Hornets | 40–18 | South Wales Scorpions | 25 April, 15:00 GMT | Spotland Stadium | 402 |
| Whitehaven | 40–24 | Oldham R.L.F.C. | 25 April, 15:00 GMT | Recreation Ground | 946 |

=== Play-offs ===
Elimination play-offs
11 September 2010
3 | Rochdale Hornets | 39
6 | Oldham | 18
11 September 2010
4 | Doncaster | 34
5 | Whitehaven | 16

Qualifying/Elimination semifinal
18 September 2010
1 | Keighley Cougars | 10
2 | Workington Town | 19
18 September 2010
Rochdale Hornets | 26
Doncaster | 18

Elimination final
25 September 2010
Keighley Cougars | 38
Rochdale Hornets | 23

Grand Final
2 October 2010, Halliwell Jones Stadium
Workington Town | 12
Keighley Cougars | 32

== Statistics ==
The following are the top points scorers in Championship 1 during the 2011 season. Statistics also include tries and goals scored in the play-offs.

Most tries
| Player | Team | Tries |
|---|---|---|
| Andy Saywell | Rochdale Hornets | 22 |
| Ian Mort | Swinton Lions | 21 |
| Scott Kaighan | Workington Town | 21 |
| Dale Bloomfield | Rochdale Hornets | 19 |
| Gavin Dodd | Swinton Lions | 17 |
| Andrew Gay | South Wales Scorpions | 16 |
| Craig Calvert | Whitehaven | 15 |
| Chris Spurr | Doncaster | 13 |
| Mark Brocklehurst | Oldham R.L.F.C. | 13 |
| Ben Heaton | Oldham R.L.F.C. | 13 |
| Steve Parry | South Wales Scorpions | 13 |
| Neil Frazer | Workington Town | 13 |

Most goals
| Player | Team | Goals |
|---|---|---|
| Ian Mort | Swinton Lions | 104 |
| Paul Crook | Rochdale Hornets | 100 |
| Darren Holt | Workington Town | 73 |
| Scott Spaven | Doncaster | 70 |
| Carl Forber | Oldham R.L.F.C. | 63 |
| Danny Lawton | Keighley Cougars | 58 |
| Lewis Palfrey | Whitehaven | 56 |
| Lewis Reece | South Wales Scorpions | 54 |
| Dylan Skee | London Skolars | 36 |
| Chris Baines | Keighley Cougars | 33 |

Most points
| Player | Team | Tries | Goals | DGs | Points |
|---|---|---|---|---|---|
| Ian Mort | Swinton Lions | 21 | 104 | 0 | 292 |
| Paul Crook | Rochdale Hornets | 10 | 100 | 5 | 245 |
| Scott Spaven | Doncaster | 7 | 70 | 1 | 169 |
| Darren Holt | Workington Town | 1 | 73 | 5 | 155 |
| Danny Lawton | Keighley Cougars | 9 | 58 | 0 | 152 |
| Carl Forber | Oldham R.L.F.C. | 5 | 63 | 0 | 146 |
| Lewis Palfrey | Whitehaven | 5 | 56 | 0 | 132 |
| Lewis Reece | South Wales Scorpions | 5 | 54 | 0 | 128 |
| Scott Kaighan | Workington Town | 21 | 16 | 1 | 117 |
| Dylan Skee | London Skolars | 6 | 36 | 1 | 97 |

== See also ==
- Co-operative Championship
- 2011 RFL Championship
- RFL League 1
- 2011 National League Cup
