= 2011 RFL Championship =

- Championship logo
- League: RFL Championship
- Duration: 22 Rounds (Followed by 4 round playoffs)
- Teams: 10
- Broadcast partners: Sky Sports

2011 Season
- Grand Final winners: Featherstone Rovers
- League leaders: Featherstone Rovers
- Top point-scorer: Mick Nanyn (296)
- Top try-scorer(s): Jamie Ellis, Mick Nanyn (22)

The 2011 Rugby Football League Championship is known as Co-operative Championship due to sponsorship by The Co-operative Group.

The 2011 Co-operative Championship is a semi-professional rugby league football competition played in the UK and France one tier below the first tier Super League. The two worst performing teams during the season, with the exception of Toulouse Olympique, will be relegated to Championship 1.

There is no automatic promotion from this league to Super League, which uses a licensing system renewed every three years. Qualifying for the Grand Final or winning the Northern Rail Cup is a prerequisite for Championship clubs to be able to apply for a licence in the next round of applications for the 2012–14 period.

All of the teams in the 2011 Co-operative Championship will also compete in the 2011 Challenge Cup where they will enter in the third round. All of the teams will also compete in the 2011 National League Cup which starts before the Co-operative Championship with the finals held mid season.

== Teams ==
This competition features mostly the same teams as it did in 2010. The Hunslet Hawks and York City Knights were promoted from the 2010 Championship 1 while the Keighley Cougars and Whitehaven were relegated.

Legend
Reigning champions
Defending Northern Rail Cup Champions
Promoted

Team & Current Season	Stadium	Capacity	Location
Barrow Raiders	Craven Park	7,600	Barrow-in-Furness, Cumbria
Batley Bulldogs	Mount Pleasant	6,000	Batley, West Yorkshire
Dewsbury Rams	Tetley's Stadium	3,500	Dewsbury, West Yorkshire
Featherstone Rovers	Bigfellas Stadium	6,750	Featherstone, West Yorkshire
Halifax	The Shay Stadium	6,561	Halifax, West Yorkshire
Hunslet Hawks	South Leeds Stadium	4,000	Leeds, West Yorkshire
Leigh Centurions	Leigh Sports Village	12,700	Leigh, Greater Manchester
Sheffield Eagles	Bramall Lane	32,702	Sheffield, South Yorkshire
Toulouse Olympique XIII	Stade des Minimes	4,066	Toulouse, Midi-Pyrénées, France
Widnes Vikings	Stobart Stadium Halton	13,500	Widnes, Cheshire
York City Knights	Huntington Stadium	3,428	York, North Yorkshire

== Season standings ==
2011 Co-operative Championship
#	Team	Pld	W	D	L	PF	PA	PD	Bns	Pts
1	Featherstone Rovers	20	18	1	1	840	348	+492	0	56
2	Leigh Centurions	20	18	1	1	776	368	+408	1	53
3	Batley Bulldogs	20	12	0	8	498	406	+92	0	41
4	Sheffield Eagles	20	12	0	8	577	488	+89	0	39
5	Widnes Vikings	20	11	1	8	555	532	+23	0	38
6	Halifax	20	10	0	10	569	543	+26	1	36
7	Hunslet Hawks	20	4	1	15	395	630	-235	3	20
8	York City Knights	20	5	1	14	416	788	-372	3	19
9	Dewsbury Rams	20	4	1	15	413	618	−205	0	18
10	Toulouse Olympique(R)	20	4	0	16	358	663	−305	0	15
11	Barrow Raiders (R)	20	9	0	11	527	540	-13	1	0

Teams qualifying for the Play-offs
Teams in relegation position

This table is correct as of 25 August 2010 (1:12pm).

Source: https://web.archive.org/web/20110322190230/http://www.cooperativechampionship.co.uk/table_nl1.php

Classification: 1st on competition points; 2nd on match points difference.

Competition points: For win = 3; For draw = 2; For loss by 12 points or fewer = 1.

== Season results ==
=== Play-offs ===
Elimination play-offs

8 September 2011	Batley Bulldogs	22–32	Halifax	Batley
	Tries: Preece (2), Daley Williams, Manning; Goals: Handforth 2/3, Mennell 1/3		Tries: Haley, Bannister, Worrincy, Penkywicz, Beswick; Goals: Jones 6/6	Stadium: Mount Pleasant; Attendance: 1,179; Referee: Clint Sharrad

9 September 2011	Sheffield Eagles	36–20	Widnes Vikings	Sheffield
	Tries: Laulu-Togagae (2), McDonald (2), Taulapapa; Goals: Brown 8/9		Tries: Flynn (2), Ropati, Craven; Goals: Craven 2/4	Stadium: Bramall Lane; Attendance: 564; Referee: Matthew Thomason

Qualifying semi-final

15 September 2011	Featherstone Rovers	35–20	Leigh Centurions	Featherstone
	Tries: Cockayne, Finn, Saxton (3), Bostock; Goals: Finn 5/7; Drop goals: Finn		Tries: Maden, Mills, Ridyard, Nanyn; Goals: Nanyn 2/4	Stadium: Post Office Road; Attendance: 2,031; Referee: Tim Roby

Elimination semi-final

18 September 2011	Sheffield Eagles	50–12	Halifax	Sheffield
	Tries: Laulu-Togagae, Hirst, Henderson (2), McDonald (2), Taulapapa, Woodcock; Goals: Brown 9/11		Tries: Goddard, Penkywicz; Goals: Jones 2/2	Stadium: Bramall Lane; Attendance: 1,233; Referee: Matthew Thomason

Elimination final

22 September 2011	Leigh Centurions	10–20	Sheffield Eagles	Leigh
	Tries: Donlan, Nanyn; Goals: Nanyn 1/2		Tries: S. Scott, Finigan, Laulu-Togagae; Goals: Brown 4/4	Stadium: Leigh Sports Village; Attendance: 1,818; Referee: Ben Thaler

Grand Final

2 October 2011

Featherstone Rovers	40–4	Sheffield Eagles
Tries: Spears, Finn (2), Hardman, Cockayne, Hepworth, Saxton; Goals: Finn 6/7		Tries: McDonald; Goals: Brown 0/1

Halliwell Jones Stadium, Warrington
Attendance: 7,263
Referee: Matthew Thomason

Elimination play-offs
8 September 2011
3	Batley Bulldogs	22
6	Halifax	32
9 September 2011
4	Sheffield Eagles	36
5	Widnes Vikings	20

Qualifying/Elimination semifinal
15 September 2011
1	Featherstone Rovers	35
2	Leigh Centurions	20
18 September 2011
Halifax	12
Sheffield Eagles	50

Elimination final
22 September 2011
Leigh Centurions	10
Sheffield Eagles	20

Grand Final
2 October 2011
Featherstone Rovers	40
' Sheffield Eagles	4

== Statistics ==
The following are the top points scorers in the Championship during the 2011 season. Statistics also include tries and goals scored in the play-offs.

Most tries

Player	Team	Tries
Jamie Ellis	Leigh Centurions	22
Mick Nanyn	Leigh Centurions	22
Andy Ballard	Barrow Raiders	20
Bryn Powell	Featherstone Rovers	20
Tom Saxton	Featherstone Rovers	18
Paul White	Halifax	17
Martyn Ridyard	Leigh Centurions	17
Quentin Laulu-Togagae	Sheffield Eagles	17
Menzie Yere	Sheffield Eagles	16
Jon Hepworth	Featherstone Rovers	15

Most goals

Player	Team	Goals
Liam Finn	Featherstone Rovers	115
Mick Nanyn	Leigh Centurions	104
Simon Brown	Sheffield Eagles	95
Steve Tyrer	Widnes Vikings	69
Danny Jones	Halifax	65
Jamie Rooney	Barrow Raiders	63
Paul Handforth	Batley Bulldogs	59
Darren Nicholls	Toulouse Olympique	40
Dominic Brambani	Dewsbury Rams	39
Pat Walker	Dewsbury Rams	29

Most points

Player	Team	Tries	Goals	DGs	Points
Mick Nanyn	Leigh Centurions	22	104	0	296
Liam Finn	Featherstone Rovers	14	115	1	287
Simon Brown	Sheffield Eagles	2	95	1	199
Steve Tyrer	Widnes Vikings	12	69	0	186
Danny Jones	Halifax	6	65	0	154
Jamie Rooney	Barrow Raiders	6	63	1	151
Paul Handforth	Batley Bulldogs	4	59	0	134
Darren Nicholls	Toulouse Olympique	13	40	0	132
Dominic Brambani	Dewsbury Rams	6	39	1	103
Jamie Ellis	Leigh Centurions	22	7	0	102

== See also ==
- Co-operative Championship
- 2011 Championship 1
- British rugby league system
- Super League
- Rugby League Conference
- Northern Ford Premiership
- National League Cup
