= 2013 RFL Championship season results =

This is a list of the 2013 RFL Championship season results. The Championship is the second-tier rugby league competition in the United Kingdom. The 2013 season started on 31 January and ends on 29 September with the Grand Final at Leigh Sports Village in Leigh, Greater Manchester, which replaces the previous venue of the Halliwell Jones Stadium in Warrington. 2013 is the first season to consist of a 14-team division, with the league expanding from 10 teams following the promotion of the top 4 teams from the 2012 Championship 1 season, Barrow Raiders, Doncaster, Whitehaven and Workington Town.

The 2013 season consists of two stages. The regular season was played over 26 round-robin fixtures, in which each of the fourteen teams involved in the competition played each other once at home and once away. In the Championship, a win was worth three points in the table, a draw worth two points apiece, and a loss by 12 points or less during the game earned one bonus point. Defeats by more than 12 points yielded no points.

The Championship will be decided through the second stage of the season, the play-offs, which has been re-structured following the expansion. The play-offs now adopts the 8-team play-off, similar to what is used in the Super League with the top eight teams in the table contest to play in the Grand Final, the winners of which will be crowned champions. A decision whether to use the club-call system, as used in Super League, will be taken during the regular season.

== Regular season ==
=== Round 1 ===
Home	Score	Away	Match Information
Home	Score	Away	Date and Time	Venue	Referee	Attendance
Halifax	18 – 10	Sheffield Eagles	31 January, 19:30 GMT	The Shay	George Stokes	1,553
Batley Bulldogs	42 – 10	Keighley Cougars	3 February, 14:00 GMT	Mount Pleasant	Gareth Hewer	775
Doncaster	16 – 22	Dewsbury Rams	3 February, 15:00 GMT	Keepmoat Stadium	Matt Thomason	857
Featherstone Rovers	38 – 6	Leigh Centurions	3 February, 15:00 GMT	Bigfellas Stadium	Thierry Alibert	2,831
Hunslet Hawks	42 – 12	Barrow Raiders	3 February, 15:00 GMT	South Leeds Stadium	Jamie Leahy	491
Swinton Lions	10 – 14	Workington Town	3 February, 15:00 GMT	Leigh Sports Village	Chris Leatherbarrow	601
Whitehaven	32 – 22	York City Knights	3 February, 15:00 GMT	Recreation Ground	Warren Turley	801

=== Round 2 ===
Home	Score	Away	Match Information
Home	Score	Away	Date and Time	Venue	Referee	Attendance
Sheffield Eagles	13 – 6	Batley Bulldogs	8 February, 19:30 GMT	Don Valley Stadium	Ronnie Lawton	1,008
Barrow Raiders	4 – 14	Doncaster	10 February, 15:00 GMT	Craven Park	Gareth Hewer	876
Keighley Cougars	12 – 16	Whitehaven	10 February, 15:00 GMT	Cougar Park	George Stokes	712
Leigh Centurions	40 – 0	Hunslet Hawks	10 February, 15:00 GMT	Leigh Sports Village	Warren Turley	1,419
Workington Town	8 – 20	Halifax	10 February, 15:00 GMT	Derwent Park	Matt Thomason	1,020
York City Knights	34 – 12	Swinton Lions	10 February, 15:00 GMT	Huntington Stadium	Dave Merrick	532
Dewsbury Rams	20 – 22	Featherstone Rovers	10 February, 18:00 GMT	Tetley's Stadium	Thierry Alibert	1,286

=== Round 3 ===
Home	Score	Away	Match Information
Home	Score	Away	Date and Time	Venue	Referee	Attendance
Whitehaven	14 – 28	Leigh Centurions	14 February, 19:30 GMT	Recreation Ground	Matt Thomason	764
Batley Bulldogs	42 – 4	York City Knights	17 February, 14:00 GMT	Mount Pleasant	George Stokes	720
Doncaster	26 – 4	Workington Town	17 February, 15:00 GMT	Keepmoat Stadium	Thierry Alibert	676
Featherstone Rovers	58 – 12	Barrow Raiders	17 February, 15:00 GMT	Bigfellas Stadium	Ronnie Lawton	2,389
Halifax	30 – 20	Keighley Cougars	17 February, 15:00 GMT	The Shay	Jamie Leahy	1,972
Hunslet Hawks	4 – 14	Dewsbury Rams	17 February, 15:00 GMT	South Leeds Stadium	Dave Merrick	628
Swinton Lions	20 – 52	Sheffield Eagles	17 February, 15:00 GMT	Leigh Sports Village	Gareth Hewer	515

=== Round 4 ===
Home	Score	Away	Match Information
Home	Score	Away	Date and Time	Venue	Referee	Attendance
Barrow Raiders	10 – 20	Batley Bulldogs	21 February, 19:30 GMT	Craven Park	Chris Leatherbarrow	936
Keighley Cougars	10 – 20	Swinton Lions	23 February, 18:00 GMT	Cougar Park	Steve Ganson	526
Dewsbury Rams	46 – 8	Whitehaven	24 February, 15:00 GMT	Tetley's Stadium	Matt Thomason	813
Featherstone Rovers	36 – 18	Hunslet Hawks	24 February, 15:00 GMT	Bigfellas Stadium	Jamie Leahy	2,319
Leigh Centurions	34 – 8	Doncaster	24 February, 15:00 GMT	Leigh Sports Village	George Stokes	1,522
Workington Town	24 – 28	Sheffield Eagles	24 February, 15:00 GMT	Derwent Park	Warren Turley	683
York City Knights	14 – 18	Halifax	24 February, 15:00 GMT	Huntington Stadium	Ronnie Lawton	909

=== Round 5 ===
Home	Score	Away	Match Information
Home	Score	Away	Date and Time	Venue	Referee	Attendance
Batley Bulldogs	18 – 18	Halifax	28 February, 19:30 GMT	loverugbyleague.com Stadium	George Stokes	948
Sheffield Eagles	46 – 14	York City Knights	1 March, 19:30 GMT	Bramall Lane	Gareth Hewer	1,011
Hunslet Hawks	42 – 22	Doncaster	3 March, 15:00 GMT	South Leeds Stadium	Tim Roby	415
Keighley Cougars	16 – 46	Leigh Centurions	3 March, 15:00 GMT	Cougar Park	Ronnie Lawton	859
Swinton Lions	18 – 23	Dewsbury Rams	3 March, 15:00 GMT	Leigh Sports Village	Chris Leatherbarrow	581
Whitehaven	18 – 45	Featherstone Rovers	3 March, 15:00 GMT	Recreation Ground	Warren Turley	917
Workington Town	38 – 10	Barrow Raiders	3 March, 15:00 GMT	Derwent Park	Jamie Leahy	972

=== Round 6 ===
Home	Score	Away	Match Information
Home	Score	Away	Date and Time	Venue	Referee	Attendance
Featherstone Rovers	52 – 10	Keighley Cougars	7 March, 19:30 GMT	Bigfellas Stadium	Chris Leatherbarrow	2,263
Leigh Centurions	18 – 40	Sheffield Eagles	8 March, 19:30 GMT	Leigh Sports Village	George Stokes	1,581
Barrow Raiders	36 – 22	Dewsbury Rams	10 March, 15:00 GMT	Craven Park	Joe Cobb	819
Doncaster	18 – 24	Batley Bulldogs	10 March, 15:00 GMT	Keepmoat Stadium	Tim Roby	781
Halifax	34 – 22	Swinton Lions	10 March, 15:00 GMT	The Shay	Matt Thomason	1,493
Hunslet Hawks	30 – 0	Whitehaven	10 March, 15:00 GMT	South Leeds Stadium	Ronnie Laughton	375
York City Knights	48 – 6	Workington Town	10 March, 15:00 GMT	Huntington Stadium	Gareth Hewer	510

=== Round 7 ===
Home	Score	Away	Match Information
Home	Score	Away	Date and Time	Venue	Referee	Attendance
Sheffield Eagles	26 – 18	Featherstone Rovers	14 March, 19:30 GMT	Don Valley Stadium	Gareth Hewer	1,243
Barrow Raiders	20 – 30	Whitehaven	17 March, 15:00 GMT	Craven Park	Chris Leatherbarrow	1,214
Dewsbury Rams	6 – 36	Leigh Centurions	17 March, 15:00 GMT	Tetley's Stadium	Matt Thomasson	935
Halifax	38 – 6	Hunslet Hawks	17 March, 15:00 GMT	The Shay	Warren Turley	1,555
Keighley Cougars	34 – 0	York City Knights	17 March, 15:00 GMT	Cougar Park	Jamie Leahy	739
Swinton Lions	14 – 6	Doncaster	17 March, 15:00 GMT	Leigh Sports Village	Ronnie Laughton	468
Workington Town	16 – 30	Batley Bulldogs	17 March, 15:00 GMT	Derwent Park	George Stokes	750

=== Round 8 ===
Home	Score	Away	Match Information
Home	Score	Away	Date and Time	Venue	Referee	Attendance
Leigh Centurions	42 – 30	Barrow Raiders	21 March, 19:30 GMT	Leigh Sports Village	Gareth Hewer	1,290
Whitehaven	12 – 22	Halifax	24 March, 15:00 GMT	Recreation Ground	George Stokes	737
Batley Bulldogs	36 – 6	Swinton Lions	12 May, 14:00 BST^{A}	loverugbyleague.com Stadium	Gareth Hewer	583
Dewsbury Rams	18 – 10	Keighley Cougars	12 May, 15:00 BST^{A}	Tetley's Stadium	Jamie Leahy	818
Hunslet Hawks	22 – 38	Sheffield Eagles	29 May, 19:30 BST^{A}	South Leeds Stadium	George Stokes	491
Featherstone Rovers	40 – 0	Workington Town	30 June, 15:00 BST^{A}	Bigfellas Stadium	Ronnie Laughton	2,110
Doncaster	38 – 20	York City Knights	28 August, 19:30 BST^{A}	Keepmoat Stadium	Dave Merrick	580

=== Round 9 ===
Home	Score	Away	Match Information
Home	Score	Away	Date and Time	Venue	Referee	Attendance
Halifax	60 – 6	Dewsbury Rams	28 March, 19:45 GMT	The Shay	Ronnie Laughton	1,100
Swinton Lions	12 – 20	Leigh Centurions	29 March, 12:00 GMT	Leigh Sports Village	Thierry Alibert	1,172
Workington Town	28 – 16	Whitehaven	29 March, 13:00 GMT	Derwent Park	Chris Leatherbarrow	1,648
York City Knights	24 – 16	Featherstone Rovers	29 March, 13:00 GMT	Huntington Stadium	Gareth Hewer	945
Keighley Cougars	24 – 20	Barrow Raiders	29 March, 15:00 GMT	Cougar Park	Matt Thomasson	783
Batley Bulldogs	28 – 12	Hunslet Hawks	29 March, 19:30 GMT	loverugbyleague.com Stadium	Jamie Leahy	671
Sheffield Eagles	32 – 26	Doncaster	29 March, 19:30 GMT	Don Valley Stadium	Joe Cobb	1,253

=== Round 10 ===
Home	Score	Away	Match Information
Home	Score	Away	Date and Time	Venue	Referee	Attendance
Featherstone Rovers	38 – 18	Swinton Lions	1 April, 13:00 BST	Bigfellas Stadium	Dave Merrick	1,910
Hunslet Hawks	18 – 22	Keighley Cougars	1 April, 14:00 BST	South Leeds Stadium	George Stokes	455
Leigh Centurions	42 – 22	Workington Town	1 April, 14:00 BST	Leigh Sports Village	Matt Thomasson	1,446
Barrow Raiders	20 – 18	York City Knights	1 April, 15:00 BST	Craven Park	Chris Leatherbarro	1,002
Whitehaven	30 – 16	Sheffield Eagles	1 April, 15:00 BST	Recreation Ground	Ronnie Laughton	569
Doncaster	10 – 34	Halifax	1 April, 15:30 BST	Keepmoat Stadium	Peter Brooke	1,000
Dewsbury Rams	12 – 30	Batley Bulldogs	1 April, 18:00 BST	Tetley's Stadium	Gareth Hewer	1,137

=== Round 11 ===
Home	Score	Away	Match Information
Home	Score	Away	Date and Time	Venue	Referee	Attendance
Doncaster	12 – 28	Featherstone Rovers	11 April, 19:30 BST	Keepmoat Stadium	Matt Thomason	801
Batley Bulldogs	30 – 16	Whitehaven	14 April, 14:00 BST	loverugbyleague.com Stadium	Dave Merrick	826
Halifax	60 – 10	Leigh Centurions	14 April, 15:00 BST	The Shay	Chris Leatherbarrow	2,161
Sheffield Eagles	44 – 18	Barrow Raiders	14 April, 15:00 BST	Don Valley Stadium	Jamie Leahy	1,177
Swinton Lions	44 – 40	Hunslet Hawks	14 April, 15:00 BST	Leigh Sports Village	Gareth Hewer	453
York City Knights	29 – 20	Dewsbury Rams	14 April, 15:00 BST	Huntington Stadium	George Stokes	705
Workington Town	25 – 18	Keighley Cougars	14 August, 20:00 BST^{B}	Derwent Park	Peter Brooke	607

=== Round 12 ===
Home	Score	Away	Match Information
Home	Score	Away	Date and Time	Venue	Referee	Attendance
Barrow Raiders	36 – 16	Swinton Lions	28 April, 15:00 BST	Craven Park	Peter Brooke	987
Dewsbury Rams	16 – 18	Workington Town	28 April, 15:00 BST	Tetley's Stadium	Chris Leatherbarrow	715
Featherstone Rovers	40 – 18	Halifax	28 April, 15:00 BST	Bigfellas Stadium	George Stokes	3,686
Hunslet Hawks	26 – 12	York City Knights	28 April, 15:00 BST	South Leeds Stadium	Ronnie Laughton	609
Keighley Cougars	18 – 28	Sheffield Eagles	28 April, 15:00 BST	Cougar Park	Gareth Hewer	623
Leigh Centurions	20 – 0	Batley Bulldogs	28 April, 15:00 BST	Leigh Sports Village	Matt Thomason	1,635
Whitehaven	24 – 14	Doncaster	28 April, 15:00 BST	Recreation Ground	Dave Merrick	567

=== Round 13 ===
Home	Score	Away	Match Information
Home	Score	Away	Date and Time	Venue	Referee	Attendance
Swinton Lions	30 – 24	Whitehaven	2 May, 19:30 BST	Leigh Sports Village	George Stokes	1,411
Sheffield Eagles	36 – 18	Dewsbury Rams	3 May, 19:30 BST	Don Valley Stadium	Matt Thomason	904
Batley Bulldogs	12 – 16	Featherstone Rovers	5 May, 14:00 BST	LoveRugbyLeague.com Stadium	Chris Leatherbarrow	1,245
Doncaster	32 – 12	Keighley Cougars	5 May, 15:00 BST	Keepmoat Stadium	Jamie Leahy	686
Halifax	56 – 30	Barrow Raiders	5 May, 15:00 BST	The Shay	Tom Crashley	1,577
Workington Town	32 – 18	Hunslet Hawks	5 May, 15:00 BST	Derwent Park	Warren Turley	708
York City Knights	4 – 52	Leigh Centurions	5 May, 15:00 BST	Huntington Stadium	Peter Brooke	709

=== Round 14 ===
Home	Score	Away	Match Information
Home	Score	Away	Date and Time	Venue	Referee	Attendance
Hunslet Hawks	18 – 24	Batley Bulldogs	23 May, 19:30 BST	South Leeds Centre	Jamie Leahy	850
Sheffield Eagles	31 – 18	Halifax	24 May, 19:30 BST	Bramall Lane	Matt Thomason	1,104
Dewsbury Rams	24 – 16	Swinton Lions	26 May, 15:00 BST	Tetley's Stadium	Ronnie Laughton	693
Featherstone Rovers	52 – 6	York City Knights	26 May, 15:00 BST	Bigfellas Stadium	Dave Merrick	2,208
Leigh Centurions	62 – 12	Keighley Cougars	26 May, 15:00 BST	Leigh Sports Village	Gareth Hewer	1,551
Whitehaven	30 – 18	Barrow Raiders	26 May, 15:00 BST	Recreation Ground	Tom Crashley	850
Workington Town	20 – 24	Doncaster	26 May, 15:00 BST	Derwent Park	Joe Cobb	585

=== Round 15 ===
Home	Score	Away	Match Information
Home	Score	Away	Date and Time	Venue	Referee	Attendance
Keighley Cougars	28 – 20	Workington Town	30 May, 19:30 BST	Cougar Park	Matt Thomason	623
Leigh Centurions	8 – 23	Featherstone Rovers	1 June, 13:00 BST	Leigh Sports Village	George Stokes	2,077
Batley Bulldogs	22 – 10	Dewsbury Rams	2 June, 15:00 BST	LoveRugbyLeague.com Stadium	Dave Merrick	1,074
Barrow Raiders	18 – 20	Sheffield Eagles	2 June, 15:00 BST	Craven Park	Joe Cobb	874
Swinton Lions	18 – 76	Halifax	2 June, 15:00 BST	Leigh Sports Village	Gareth Hewer	726
Whitehaven	22 – 14	Hunslet Hawks	2 June, 15:00 BST	Recreation Ground	Chris Leatherbarrow	670
York City Knights	42 – 10	Doncaster	2 June, 15:00 BST	Huntington Stadium	Jamie Leahy	701

=== Round 16 ===
Home	Score	Away	Match Information
Home	Score	Away	Date and Time	Venue	Referee	Attendance
Dewsbury Rams	22 – 12	Barrow Raiders	9 June, 15:00 BST	Tetley's Stadium	Jamie Leahy	714
Featherstone Rovers	24 – 36	Doncaster	9 June, 15:00 BST	Leigh Sports Village	Joe Cobb	2,010
Hunslet Hawks	24 – 31	Halifax	9 June, 15:00 BST	South Leeds Stadium	Ronnie Laughton	722
Sheffield Eagles	56 – 18	Whitehaven	9 June, 15:00 BST	Don Valley Stadium	Dave Merrick	1,000
Swinton Lions	10 – 46	Batley Bulldogs	9 June, 15:00 BST	Leigh Sports Village	Chris Leatherbarrow	646
Workington Town	26 – 22	Leigh Centurions	9 June, 15:00 BST	Derwent Park	Warren Turley	725
York City Knights	32 – 12	Keighley Cougars	9 June, 15:00 BST	Huntington Stadium	George Stokes	1,006

=== Round 17 ===
Home	Score	Away	Match Information
Home	Score	Away	Date and Time	Venue	Referee	Attendance
Batley Bulldogs	8 – 14	Sheffield Eagles	20 June, 19:30 BST	LoveRugbyLeague.com Stadium	Chris Leatherbarrow	814
Whitehaven	29 – 18	Workington Town	23 June, 12:00 BST	Recreation Ground	Ronnie Laughton	1,334
Barrow Raiders	6 – 60	Featherstone Rovers	23 June, 15:00 BST	Craven Park	Gareth Hewer	1,185
Dewsbury Rams	16 – 35	Halifax	23 June, 15:00 BST	Tetley's Stadium	Warren Turley	1,396
Hunslet Hawks	6 – 36	Swinton Lions	23 June, 15:00 BST	South Leeds Stadium	Joe Cobb	463
Keighley Cougars	34 – 10	Doncaster	23 June, 15:00 BST	Cougar Park	Jamie Leahy	757
Leigh Centurions	42 – 20	York City Knights	23 June, 15:00 BST	Leigh Sports Village	Matt Thomason	1,373

=== Round 18 ===
Home	Score	Away	Match Information
Home	Score	Away	Date and Time	Venue	Referee	Attendance
York City Knights	24 – 26	Barrow Raiders	4 July, 19:30 BST	Huntington Stadium	Chris Leatherbarrow	827
Sheffield Eagles	34 – 10	Swinton Lions	5 July, 19:30 BST	Don Valley Stadium	Joe Cobb	814
Doncaster	30 – 36	Leigh Centurions	7 July, 15:00 BST	Keepmoat Stadium	Ronnie Laughton	595
Featherstone Rovers	18 – 12	Batley Bulldogs	7 July, 15:00 BST	Bigfellas Stadium	Dave Merrick	2,435
Halifax	50 – 18	Whitehaven	7 July, 15:00 BST	The Shay	Gareth Hewer	2,325
Keighley Cougars	28 – 20	Hunslet Hawks	7 July, 15:00 BST	Cougar Park	Warren Turley	813
Workington Town	22 – 6	Dewsbury Rams	7 July, 15:00 BST	Derwent Park	Chris Leatherbarrow	635

=== Round 19 ===
Home	Score	Away	Match Information
Home	Score	Away	Date and Time	Venue	Referee	Attendance
Halifax	16 – 30	Featherstone Rovers	11 July, 19:30 BST	The Shay	Dave Merrick	2,063
Barrow Raiders	22 – 34	Leigh Centurions	14 July, 15:00 BST	Craven Park	Gareth Hewer	972
Dewsbury Rams	20 – 16	York City Knights	14 July, 15:00 BST	Tetley's Stadium	Chris Leatherbarrow	739
Doncaster	30 – 26	Hunslet Hawks	14 July, 15:00 BST	Keepmoat Stadium	Tom Crashley	721
Swinton Lions	16 – 36	Keighley Cougars	14 July, 15:00 BST	Leigh Sports Village	Matt Thomason	518
Whitehaven	36 – 30	Batley Bulldogs	14 July, 15:00 BST	Recreation Ground	Warren Turley	730
Sheffield Eagles	36 – 0	Workington Town	31 July, 19:30 BST^{C}	Don Valley Stadium	Dave Merrick	732

=== Round 20 ===
Home	Score	Away	Match Information
Home	Score	Away	Date and Time	Venue	Referee	Attendance
Batley Bulldogs	12 – 26	Doncaster	21 July, 14:00 BST	LoveRugbyLeague.com Stadium	Ronnie Laughton	601
Barrow Raiders	28 – 26	Hunslet Hawks	21 July, 15:00 BST	Craven Park	George Stokes	929
Keighley Cougars	28 – 32	Dewsbury Rams	21 July, 15:00 BST	Cougar Park	Gareth Hewer	937
Workington Town	44 – 20	Swinton Lions	21 July, 15:00 BST	Derwent Park	Tom Crashley	676
York City Knights	4 – 20	Whitehaven	21 July, 15:00 BST	Huntington Stadium	Dave Merrick	615
Leigh Centurions	11 – 4	Halifax	31 July, 19:30 BST^{D}	Leigh Sports Village	Gareth Hewer	2,000
Featherstone Rovers	40 – 24	Sheffield Eagles	28 August, 19:30 BST^{D}	Bigfellas Stadium	Chris Leatherbarrow	3,890

=== Round 21 ===
Home	Score	Away	Match Information
Home	Score	Away	Date and Time	Venue	Referee	Attendance
Whitehaven	16 – 15	Dewsbury Rams	25 July, 19:30 BST	Recreation Ground	Warren Turley	756
Sheffield Eagles	34 – 10	Keighley Cougars	26 July, 19:30 BST	Don Valley Stadium		710
Batley Bulldogs	16 – 18	Workington Town	28 July, 14:00 BST	LoveRugbyLeague.com Stadium	Matt Thomason	450
Doncaster	32 – 4	Barrow Raiders	28 July, 15:00 BST	Keepmoat Stadium	Chris Leatherbarrow	560
Halifax	18 – 16	York City Knights	28 July, 15:00 BST	The Shay	George Stokes	1,722
Hunslet Hawks	12 – 19	Leigh Centurions	28 July, 15:00 BST	South Leeds Stadium	Gareth Hewer	432
Swinton Lions	12 – 10	Featherstone Rovers	28 July, 15:00 BST	Leigh Sports Village	Tom Crashley	778

=== Round 22 ===
Home	Score	Away	Match Information
Home	Score	Away	Date and Time	Venue	Referee	Attendance
Barrow Raiders	26 – 12	Halifax	4 August, 15:00 BST	Craven Park	Warren Turley	1,102
Dewsbury Rams	20 – 16	Hunslet Hawks	4 August, 15:00 BST	Tetley's Stadium		743
Doncaster	46 – 4	Whitehaven	4 August, 15:00 BST	Keepmoat Stadium		551
Keighley Cougars	6 – 46	Batley Bulldogs	4 August, 15:00 BST	Cougar Park		716
Leigh Centurions	32 – 22	Swinton Lions	4 August, 15:00 BST	Leigh Sports Village		1,614
Workington Town	6 – 62	Featherstone Rovers	4 August, 15:00 BST	Derwent Park		813
York City Knights	16 – 42	Sheffield Eagles	4 August, 15:00 BST	Huntington Stadium	Gareth Hewer	641

=== Round 23 ===
Home	Score	Away	Match Information
Home	Score	Away	Date and Time	Venue	Referee	Attendance
Swinton Lions	34 – 10	York City Knights	8 August, 19:30 BST	Leigh Sports Village	Chris Leatherbarrow	402
Sheffield Eagles	20 – 8	Leigh Centurions	9 August, 19:30 BST	Don Valley Stadium	Matt Thomason	1,012
Batley Bulldogs	54 – 4	Barrow Raiders	11 August, 14:00 BST	LoveRugbyLeague.com Stadium	Tom Crashley
Featherstone Rovers	52 – 18	Dewsbury Rams	11 August, 15:00 BST	Bigfellas Stadium	Gareth Hewer	2,281
Halifax	28 – 28	Doncaster	11 August, 15:00 BST	The Shay	Warren Turley	1,428
Hunslet Hawks	22 – 16	Workington Town	11 August, 15:00 BST	South Leeds Stadium	Dave Merrick	382
Whitehaven	18 – 52	Keighley Cougars	11 August, 15:00 BST	Recreation Ground	Joe Cobb	750

=== Round 24 ===
Home	Score	Away	Match Information
Home	Score	Away	Date and Time	Venue	Referee	Attendance
Barrow Raiders	36 – 18	Workington Town	18 August, 15:00 BST	Craven Park	Jamie Bloem	1,157
Dewsbury Rams	18 – 30	Sheffield Eagles	18 August, 15:00 BST	Tetley's Stadium	Peter Brooke	857
Doncaster	29 – 26	Swinton Lions	18 August, 15:00 BST	Keepmoat Stadium	Dave Sharpe	597
Halifax	29 – 24	Batley Bulldogs	18 August, 15:00 BST	The Shay	Dave Merrick	1,178
Keighley Cougars	12 – 24	Featherstone Rovers	18 August, 15:00 BST	Cougar Park		1,235
Leigh Centurions	44 – 6	Whitehaven	18 August, 15:00 BST	Leigh Sports Village		1,523
York City Knights	30 – 33	Hunslet Hawks	18 August, 15:00 BST	Huntington Stadium		715

=== Round 25 ===
Home	Score	Away	Match Information
Home	Score	Away	Date and Time	Venue	Referee	Attendance
Batley Bulldogs	24 – 18	Leigh Centurions	22 August, 19:30 BST	LoveRugbyLeague.com Stadium	Dave Merrick	704
Dewsbury Rams	24 – 10	Doncaster	22 August, 19:30 BST	Tetley's Stadium	Gareth Hewer	751
Featherstone Rovers	54 – 4	Whitehaven	22 August, 19:30 BST	Bigfellas Stadium	Warren Turley	2,110
Keighley Cougars	4 – 34	Halifax	22 August, 19:30 BST	Cougar Park	Dave Sharpe	1,217
Sheffield Eagles	36 – 26	Hunslet Hawks	22 August, 19:30 BST	Don Valley Stadium	Ronnie Laughton	1,184
Swinton Lions	22 – 0	Barrow Raiders	22 August, 19:30 BST	Leigh Sports Village	George Stokes	571
Workington Town	22 – 18	York City Knights	22 August, 19:30 BST	Derwent Park	Matt Thomason	576

=== Round 26 ===
Home	Score	Away	Match Information
Home	Score	Away	Date and Time	Venue	Referee	Attendance
Barrow Raiders	24 – 14	Keighley Cougars	1 September, 15:00 BST	Craven Park	Joe Cobb	1,375
Doncaster	34 – 20	Sheffield Eagles	1 September, 15:00 BST	Keepmoat Stadium	Warren Turley	1,063
Halifax	40 – 18	Workington Town	1 September, 15:00 BST	The Shay	Thierry Alibert	1,579
Hunslet Hawks	8 – 46	Featherstone Rovers	1 September, 15:00 BST	South Leeds Stadium	Matt Thomason	1,256
Leigh Centurions	22 – 24	Dewsbury Rams	1 September, 15:00 BST	Leigh Sports Village	Jamie Bloem
Whitehaven	24 – 32	Swinton Lions	1 September, 15:00 BST	Recreation Ground	Dave Sharpe	553
York City Knights	16 – 34	Batley Bulldogs	1 September, 15:00 BST	Huntington Stadium	George Stokes	706

== Play-offs ==
The play-offs will commence following the conclusion of the regular season and includes the top eight sides from the league and uses a top 8 play-off system, similar to Super League and AFL, culminating in the grand final at Leigh Sports Village in Leigh, Greater Manchester, home of Championship sides Leigh Centurions and Swinton Lions. Unlike the Super League playoffs, there is no Club Call in week three.

=== Week 1 ===
#	Home	Score	Away	Match Information
#	Home	Score	Away	Date and Time	Venue	Referee	Attendance
Qualifying Play-offs
QP1	Featherstone Rovers	40 – 26	Leigh Centurions	8 September 2013, 15:00 BST	Bigfellas Stadium	Matt Thomason	2,006
QP2	Sheffield Eagles	6 – 21	Halifax	6 September 2013, 19:30 BST	Don Valley Stadium	Dave Merrick	773
Elimination Play-offs
EP1	Batley Bulldogs	68 – 28	Workington Town	8 September 2013, 14:00 BST	Mount Pleasant	Warren Turley	631
EP2	Doncaster	28 – 30	Dewsbury Rams	8 September 2013, 15:00 BST	Keepmoat Stadium	George Stokes
Progress to Qualifying Semi-Final: Featherstone Rovers, Halifax; Progress to Preliminary Semi-Final: Batley Bulldogs, Dewsbury Rams, Leigh Centurions, Sheffield Eagles; Eliminated: Doncaster, Workington Town

=== Week 2 ===
#	Home	Score	Away	Match Information
#	Home	Score	Away	Date and Time	Venue	Referee	Attendance
Preliminary Semi-Final
PSF1	Sheffield Eagles	52 – 16	Dewsbury Rams	15 September 2013, 18:30 BST	Don Valley Stadium		839
PSF2	Leigh Centurions	14 – 15 AET	Batley Bulldogs	15 September 2013, 15:00 BST	Leigh Sports Village		1,413
AET=After Extra Time; Progress to Qualifying Semi-Final: Batley, Sheffield; Eliminated: Dewsbury, Leigh

=== Week 3 ===
#	Home	Score	Away	Match Information
#	Home	Score	Away	Date and Time	Venue	Referee	Attendance
Qualifying Semi-Final
QSF1	Featherstone Rovers	20 – 21 AET	Batley Bulldogs	22 September 2013, 15:00 BST	Bigfellas Stadium	Chris Leatherbarrow	2,216
QSF2	Halifax	10 – 29	Sheffield Eagles	19 September 2013, 19:00 BST	The Shay	Matt Thomason	1,700
Progress to Grand Final: Batley Bulldogs, Sheffield Eagles; Eliminated: Featherstone Rovers, Halifax

=== Week 4 ===
#	Home	Score	Away	Match Information
#	Home	Score	Away	Date and Time	Venue	Referee	Attendance
Grand Final
GF	Batley Bulldogs	12 – 19	Sheffield Eagles	29 September 2013, 16:30 BST	Leigh Sports Village	Matt Thomason	6,800

=== Play-off ladder ===
Qualifying playoffs/Elimination playoffs
8 September 2013
1	Featherstone Rovers	40
4	Leigh Centurions	26
8 September 2013
5	Batley Bulldogs	68
8	Workington Town	28
8 September 2013
6	Doncaster	28
7	Dewsbury Rams	30
6 September 2013
2	Sheffield Eagles	6
3	Halifax	21

Preliminary semifinals
15 September 2013
Leigh Centurions	14
Batley Bulldogs	15
15 September 2013
Dewsbury Rams	16
Sheffield Eagles	52

Qualifying semifinals
22 September 2013
Featherstone Rovers	20
Batley Bulldogs	21
22 September 2013
Halifax	10
Sheffield Eagles	29

Grand Final
29 September 2013, Leigh
Batley Bulldogs	12
Sheffield Eagles	19

Week 1. Qualifying/Elimination play-offs: Fixtures decided by regular reason finishing positions. Higher ranked teams play lower ranked teams. Higher ranked teams receive home ground advantage.
Week 2. Preliminary semi-finals: Fixtures decided by regular season finishing positions. Higher ranked teams play lower ranked teams. Higher ranked teams receive home ground advantage.
Week 3. Qualifying semi-finals: Winners of Qualifying play-offs play winners of Qualifying semi-finals. Higher ranked teams play lower ranked teams. Winners of Qualifying play-offs receive home ground advantage.

=== Notes ===
A. Match re-arranged for August due to Leigh's Challenge Cup Quarter Final tie

== Notes ==
A. Matches originally postponed on 24 March due to snow
B. Match postponed on 14 April due to pitch safety issues
C. Match re-arranged from 14 July due to Sheffield's Challenge Cup quarter final tie
D. Matches re-arranged from 21 July due to Northern Rail Cup final
