= 2014 Championship 1 season results =

Rugby league competition results

This is a list of the 2014 Championship 1 season results. Championship 1 is the third-tier rugby league competition in the United Kingdom. The 2014 season starts on 2 March with the Grand Final at Leigh Sports Village in Leigh, Greater Manchester.

The 2014 season consists of two stages. The regular season was played over 18 round-robin fixtures, in which each of the nine teams involved in the competition played each other once at home and once away. This means that teams will play 16 games and will have two bye-rounds, where they will not play a game. In the Championship 1, a win was worth three points in the table, a draw worth two points apiece, and a loss by less than 12 points during the game earned one bonus point. Defeats by more than 12 points yielded no points.

At the end of the regular season, due to restructuring the teams who finish the regular season between first and fifth will enter the play-offs with the winner claiming promotion.

== Regular season ==
=== Round 1 ===
| Home | Score | Away | Match information |
| Home | Score | Away | Date and time | Venue | Referee | Attendance |
|---|---|---|---|---|---|---|
| Hemel Stags | 0–28 | Hunslet Hawks | 2 March, 15:00 GMT | Pennine Way | C Kendall | 450 |
| Oxford Rugby League | 19–12 | London Skolars | 2 March, 15:00 GMT | Iffley Road | A Sweet | 435 |
| South Wales Scorpions | 4–18 | Oldham R.L.F.C. | 2 March, 15:00 GMT | Llynfi Road | Adam Gill | 458 |
| York City Knights | 26–16 | Gloucestershire All Golds | 2 March, 15:00 BST | Huntington Stadium | M Woodhead | 648 |
Bye-round: Gateshead Thunder

=== Round 2 ===
| Home | Score | Away | Match information |
| Home | Score | Away | Date and time | Venue | Referee | Attendance |
|---|---|---|---|---|---|---|
| Gateshead Thunder | 47-28 | Oxford | 9 March, 15:00 GMT | Thunderdome | M Woodward | 200 |
| Gloucestershire All Golds | 29-17 | South Wales Scorpions | 9 March, 15:00 GMT | Prince of Wales Stadium | D Sharpe | 186 |
| Hunslet Hawks | 26-28 | York City Knights | 9 March, 15:00 GMT | South Leeds Stadium | A Gill | 409 |
| Oldham R.L.F.C. | 20-20 | Hemel Stags | 9 March, 15:00 GMT | Whitebank Stadium | P Brooke | 508 |
Bye-round: London Skolars

=== Round 3 ===
| Home | Score | Away | Match information |
| Home | Score | Away | Date and time | Venue | Referee | Attendance |
|---|---|---|---|---|---|---|
| Hemel Stags | 37-24 | Gateshead Thunder | 23 March, 14:30 GMT | Pennine Way | D Sharpe | 200 |
| Oxford | 20-46 | Hunslet Hawks | 23 March, 15:00 GMT | Iffley Road | P Brooke | 301 |
| London Skolars | 16-18 | Oldham R.L.F.C. | 23 March, 15:00 GMT | New River Stadium | C Kendall | 479 |
| York City Knights | 76-00 | South Wales Scorpions | 23 March, 15:00 GMT | Huntington Stadium | A Sweet | 638 |
Bye-round: Gloucestershire All Golds

=== Round 4 ===
| Home | Score | Away | Match information |
| Home | Score | Away | Date and time | Venue | Referee | Attendance |
|---|---|---|---|---|---|---|
| Gateshead Thunder | 20-28 | Gloucestershire All Golds | 30 March, 15:00 GMT | Prince of Wales Stadium | A Gill | 248 |
| Hunslet Hawks | 60-4 | London Skolars | 30 March, 15:00 GMT | South Leeds Stadium | A Sweet | 329 |
| South Wales Scorpions | 16-34 | Hemel Stags | 30 March, 15:00 GMT | Llynfi Road | M Woodhead | 193 |
Bye-round:

=== Round 5 ===
| Home | Score | Away | Match information |
| Home | Score | Away | Date and time | Venue | Referee | Attendance |
|---|---|---|---|---|---|---|
| Gloucestershire All Golds | 4-44 | Hunslet Hawks | 13 April, 15:00 GMT | Prince of Wales stadium | D Sharpe | 306 |
| London Skolars | 66-14 | South Wales Scorpions | 13 April, 15:00 GMT | New River Stadium | M Woodhead | 417 |
| Oldham R.L.F.C. | 52-16 | Gateshead Thunder | 13 April, 15:00 GMT | Whitebank Stadium | C Kendall | 446 |
| York City Knights | 16-24 | Oxford | 13 April, 15:00 GMT | Huntington Stadium | A Gill | 574 |
Bye-round: Hemel Stags

=== Round 6 ===
| Home | Score | Away | Match information |
| Home | Score | Away | Date and time | Venue | Referee | Attendance |
|---|---|---|---|---|---|---|
| Gateshead Thunder | 26-30 | York City Knights | 18 April, 19:30 GMT | Thunderdome | C Kendall | 257 |
| Hemel Stags | 24-27 | London Skolars | 18 April, 14:30 GMT | Pennine Way | A Sweet | 284 |
| Hunslet Hawks | 38-12 | Oldham R.L.F.C. | 18 April, 14:00 GMT | South Leeds Stadium | P Brooke | 598 |
| Oxford | 38-24 | Gloucestershire All Golds | 18 April, 15:00 GMT | Iffley Road | M Woodhead | 240 |
Bye-round: South Wales Scorpions

=== Round 7 ===
| Home | Score | Away | Match information |
| Home | Score | Away | Date and time | Venue | Referee | Attendance |
|---|---|---|---|---|---|---|
| Gloucestershire All Golds | 20-21 | Hemel Stags | 4 May, 15:00 GMT | Prince of Wales stadium | C Kendall | 126 |
| Oldham R.L.F.C. | 48-28 | Oxford | 4 May, 15:00 GMT | Whitebank Stadium | M Woodhead | 504 |
| South Wales Scorpions | 16-50 | Gateshead Thunder | 4 May, 13:00 GMT | Llynfi Road | C Campbell | 258 |
| York City Knights | 36-16 | London Skolars | 4 May, 15:00 GMT | Huntington Stadium | A Gill | 451 |
Bye-round: Hunslet Hawks

=== Round 8 ===
| Home | Score | Away | Match information |
| Home | Score | Away | Date and time | Venue | Referee | Attendance |
|---|---|---|---|---|---|---|
| Gateshead Thunder | 24-16 | London Skolars | 11 May, 14:00 GMT | Thunderdome | M Woodhead | 209 |
| South Wales Scorpions | 6-20 | Hunslet Hawks | 11 May, 14:00 GMT | Glan-Yr-Afon Park | A Gill | 255 |
| York City Knights | 22-14 | Hemel Stags | 11 May, 15:00 GMT | Huntington Stadium | C Kendall | 457 |
Bye-round:

=== Round 9 ===
| Home | Score | Away | Match information |
| Home | Score | Away | Date and time | Venue | Referee | Attendance |
|---|---|---|---|---|---|---|
| Hunslet Hawks | 52-6 | Gateshead Thunder | 18 May, 15:00 GMT | South Leeds Stadium | P Brooke | 566 |
| London Skolars | 24-34 | Gloucestershire All Golds | 18 May, 15:00 GMT | Queen Elizabeth II Stadium | J Bloem | 398 |
| Oldham R.L.F.C. | 31-30 | York City Knights | 18 May, 15:00 GMT | Whitebank Stadium | A Gill | 579 |
| Oxford | 40-24 | South Wales Scorpions | 18 May, 15:00 GMT | Iffley Road | G Hewer | 236 |
Bye-round: Hemel Stags

=== Round 10 ===
| Home | Score | Away | Match information |
| Home | Score | Away | Date and time | Venue | Referee | Attendance |
|---|---|---|---|---|---|---|
| Gloucestershire All Golds | 22-30 | Oldham R.L.F.C. | 25 May, 15:00 GMT | Prince of Wales stadium | M Woodhead | 264 |
| Hemel Stags | 30-24 | Oxford | 25 May, 14:30 GMT | Pennine Way | A Gill | 170 |
| York City Knights | 40-0 | Hunslet Hawks | 25 May, 15:00 GMT | Huntington Stadium | D Merrick | 837 |
Bye-round:

=== Round 11 ===
| Home | Score | Away | Match information |
| Home | Score | Away | Date and time | Venue | Referee | Attendance |
|---|---|---|---|---|---|---|
| Hemel Stags | 22-26 | Gateshead Thunder | 1 June, 14:30 GMT | Pennine Way | C Campbell | 126 |
| Hunslet Hawks | 32-12 | Oxford | 1 June, 15:00 GMT | South Leeds Stadium | M Woodhead | 417 |
| Oldham R.L.F.C. | 46-16 | London Skolars | 1 June, 15:00 GMT | Whitebank Stadium | D Sharpe | 486 |
| South Wales Scorpions | 38-38 | Gloucestershire All Golds | 1 June, 15:00 GMT | Llynfi Road | J Bloem | 320 |
Bye-round: York City Knights

=== Round 12 ===
| Home | Score | Away | Match information |
| Home | Score | Away | Date and time | Venue | Referee | Attendance |
|---|---|---|---|---|---|---|
| London Skolars | 18-46 | South Wales Scorpions | 7 June, 15:00 GMT | Queen Elizabath II Stadium | M Woodhead | 362 |
| Gloucestershire All Golds | 24-22 | York City Knights | 8 June, 15:00 GMT | Prince of Wales stadium | P Brooke | 318 |
| Hemel Stags | 44-32 | Oldham R.L.F.C. | 8 June, 14:30 GMT | Pennine Way | D Merrick | 233 |
| Oxford | 22-36 | Gateshead Thunder | 8 June, 15:00 GMT | Iffley Road | C Kendall | 310 |
Bye-round: Hunslet Hawks

=== Round 13 ===
| Home | Score | Away | Match information |
| Home | Score | Away | Date and time | Venue | Referee | Attendance |
|---|---|---|---|---|---|---|
| Hunslet Hawks | 28-6 | Hemel Stags | 15 June, 15:00 GMT | South Leeds Stadium | D Sharpe | 450 |
| Oldham R.L.F.C. | 58-2 | South Wales Scorpions | 15 June, 15:00 GMT | Whitebank Stadium | M Woodhead | 480 |
| Oxford | 28-52 | London Skolars | 15 June, 15:00 GMT | Iffley Road | P Brooke | 316 |
| York City Knights | 42-16 | Gateshead Thunder | 15 June, 15:00 GMT | Huntington Stadium | A Gill | 495 |
Bye-round: Gloucestershire All Golds

=== Round 14 ===
| Home | Score | Away | Match information |
| Home | Score | Away | Date and time | Venue | Referee | Attendance |
|---|---|---|---|---|---|---|
| South Wales Scorpions | 10-48 | York City Knights | 21 June, 14:30 GMT | Glan Yr-Afon Park | D Sharpe | 225 |
| Gateshead Thunder | 14-32 | Oldham R.L.F.C. | 22 June, 15:00 GMT | Thunderdome | A Sweet | 253 |
| Gloucestershire All Golds | 36-20 | Oxford | 22 June, 15:00 GMT | Prince of Wales stadium | A Gill | 323 |
Bye-round:

=== Round 15 ===
| Home | Score | Away | Match information |
| Home | Score | Away | Date and time | Venue | Referee | Attendance |
|---|---|---|---|---|---|---|
| Hemel Stags | 22-46 | York City Knights | 29 June, 14:30 GMT | Pennine Way | C Campbell | 227 |
| Hunslet Hawks | 16-23 | Gloucestershire All Golds | 29 June, 15:00 GMT | South Leeds Stadium | D Sharpe | 390 |
| London Skolars | 6-66 | Gateshead Thunder | 29 June, 14:00 GMT | Queen Elizabath II Stadium | T Grant | 350 |
| Oxford | 22-38 | Oldham R.L.F.C. | 29 June, 15:00 GMT | Iffley Road | P Brooke | 256 |
Bye-round: South Wales Scorpions

=== Round 16 ===
| Home | Score | Away | Match information |
| Home | Score | Away | Date and time | Venue | Referee | Attendance |
|---|---|---|---|---|---|---|
| Gateshead Thunder | 6-45 | Hunslet Hawks | 4 July, 20:00 GMT | Thunderdome | A Sweet | 457 |
| South Wales Scorpions | 16-36 | Oxford | 5 July, 15:00 GMT | Llynfi Road | D Sharpe | 150 |
| Gloucestershire All Golds | 14-22 | Hemel Stags | 6 July, 15:00 GMT | Prince of Wales stadium | A Gill | 200 |
| London Skolars | 20-30 | York City Knights | 6 July, 15:00 GMT | Queen Elizabath II Stadium | M Woodhead | 465 |
Bye-round: Oldham R.L.F.C.

=== Round 17 ===
| Home | Score | Away | Match information |
| Home | Score | Away | Date and time | Venue | Referee | Attendance |
|---|---|---|---|---|---|---|
| Hunslet Hawks | 74-0 | South Wales Scorpions | 13 July, 15:00 GMT | South Leeds Stadium | A Gill | 456 |
| London Skolars | 34-28 | Hemel Stags | 13 July, 15:00 GMT | Queen Elizabath II Stadium | G Hewer | 378 |
| Oldham R.L.F.C. | 46-6 | Gloucestershire All Golds | 13 July, 15:00 GMT | Whitebank Stadium | J Bloem | 516 |
| Oxford | 16-58 | York City Knights | 13 July, 15:00 GMT | Dry Lea | D Merrick | 172 |
Bye-round: Gateshead Thunder

=== Round 18 ===
| Home | Score | Away | Match information |
| Home | Score | Away | Date and time | Venue | Referee | Attendance |
|---|---|---|---|---|---|---|
| Gloucestershire All Golds | 22-38 | Gateshead Thunder | 20 July, 15:00 GMT | Prince of Wales stadium | D Sharpe |
| Hemel Stags | 40-10 | South Wales Scorpions | 20 July, 14:30 GMT | Pennine Way | M Woodhead | 176 |
| York City Knights | 54-12 | Oldham R.L.F.C. | 20 July, 15:00 GMT | Huntington Stadium | T Crashley | 1,006 |
Bye-round:

=== Round 19 ===
| Home | Score | Away | Match information |
| Home | Score | Away | Date and time | Venue | Referee | Attendance |
|---|---|---|---|---|---|---|
| Gateshead Thunder | 48-28 | Oxford | 27 July, 15:00 GMT | Thunderdome | J Bloem | 153 |
| Oldham R.L.F.C. | 24-23 | Hunslet Hawks | 27 July, 15:00 GMT | Whitebank Stadium | W Turley | 678 |
| South Wales Scorpions | 19-18 | London Skolars | 27 July, 15:00 GMT | Cardiff Arms Park | A Gill | 486 |
Bye-round:

=== Round 20 ===
| Home | Score | Away | Match information |
| Home | Score | Away | Date and time | Venue | Referee | Attendance |
|---|---|---|---|---|---|---|
| Gateshead Thunder | 34-26 | Hemel Stags | 3 August, 15:00 GMT | Thunderdome | G Hewer | 166 |
| Gloucestershire All Golds | 18-42 | York City Knights | 3 August, 15:00 GMT | Prince of Wales stadium | A Gill | 184 |
| Hunslet Hawks | 48-6 | Oxford | 3 August, 15:00 GMT | South Leeds Stadium | M Woodhead | 474 |
| London Skolars | 28-38 | Oldham R.L.F.C. | 3 August, 15:00 GMT | Queen Elizabath II Stadium | D Sharpe | 419 |
Bye-round: South Wales Scorpions

=== Round 21 ===
| Home | Score | Away | Match information |
| Home | Score | Away | Date and time | Venue | Referee | Attendance |
|---|---|---|---|---|---|---|
| London Skolars | 24-31 | Oxford | 9 August, 14:00 GMT | Pennine Way | P Brooke | 186 |
| South Wales Scorpions | 16-28 | Gloucestershire All Golds | 9 August, 15:00 GMT | Llynfi Road | D Sharpe | 177 |
| Hemel Stags | 16-34 | Hunslet Hawks | 10 August, 14:30 GMT | Pennine Way stadium | A Gill | 454 |
| York City Knights | 34-30 | Gateshead Thunder | 10 August, 15:00 GMT | Huntington Stadium | G Hewer | 571 |
Bye-round: Oldham R.L.F.C.

=== Round 22 ===
| Home | Score | Away | Match information |
| Home | Score | Away | Date and time | Venue | Referee | Attendance |
|---|---|---|---|---|---|---|
| Gateshead Thunder | 58-24 | South Wales Scorpions | 17 August, 14:00 GMT | Thunderdome | | 161 |
| Gloucestershire All Golds | 12-36 | London Skolars | 17 August, 15:00 GMT | Prince of Wales stadium | S Ansell | 108 |
| Hunslet Hawks | 18-20 | York City Knights | 17 August, 15:00 GMT | South Leeds Stadium | C Kendall | 798 |
| Oldham R.L.F.C. | 38-10 | Hemel Stags | 17 August, 15:00 GMT | Whitebank Stadium | D Sharpe | 438 |
Bye-round: Oxford

=== Round 23 ===
| Home | Score | Away | Match information |
| Home | Score | Away | Date and time | Venue | Referee | Attendance |
|---|---|---|---|---|---|---|
| London Skolars | 10-36 | Hunslet Hawks | 22 August, 19:30 GMT | Queen Elizabeth II Stadium | T Crashley | 1,325 |
| Gateshead Thunder | 40-14 | Oldham R.L.F.C. | 31 August, 15:00 GMT | Thunderdome | D Merrick | 397 |
| Hemel Stags | 44-24 | Gloucestershire All Golds | 31 August, 14:30 GMT | Pennine Way | G Hewer | 305 |
| Oxford | 29-22 | South Wales Scorpions | 31 August, 15:00 GMT | Iffley Road | A Sweet | 240 |
Bye-round: York City Knights

=== Round 24 ===
| Home | Score | Away | Match information |
| Home | Score | Away | Date and time | Venue | Referee | Attendance |
|---|---|---|---|---|---|---|
| Oxford | 22-22 | Hemel Stags | 6 September, 15:00 GMT | Iffley Road | M Woodhead | 205 |
| Oldham R.L.F.C. | 68-24 | Gloucestershire All Golds | 7 September, 15:00 GMT | Whitebank Stadium | A Sweet | 437 |
| South Wales Scorpions | 6-50 | Hunslet Hawks | 7 September, 14:30 GMT | Parc Dyffryn Pennar | A Gill | 363 |
| York City Knights | 38-28 | London Skolars | 7 September, 15:00 GMT | Huntington Stadium | D Sharpe | 643 |
Bye-round: Gateshead Thunder

== Playoffs ==
=== Week 1 ===
| # | Home | Score | Away | Match information |
| # | Home | Score | Away | Date and time | Venue | Referee | Attendance |
|---|---|---|---|---|---|---|---|
Qualifying Play-off
| A | Hunslet Hawks | 24-25 | Oldham R.L.F.C. | 12 September, 20:00 GMT | South Leeds Stadium | Chris Kendall | 748 |
Elimination Play-off
| B | Gateshead Thunder | 15-14 | Hemel Stags | 14 September, 18:00 GMT | Kingston Park | Tom Crashley | 557 |

=== Week 2 ===
| # | Home | Score | Away | Match information |
| # | Home | Score | Away | Date and time | Venue | Referee | Attendance |
|---|---|---|---|---|---|---|---|
Qualifying Semi-final
| A | York City Knights | 12-31 | Oldham R.L.F.C. | 21 September, 15:00 GMT | Huntington Stadium | George Stokes | 663 |
Elimination Semi-final
| B | Hunslet Hawks | 50-6 | Gateshead Thunder | 21 September, 15:00 GMT | South Leeds Stadium | Chris Leatherbarrow | 463 |

=== Week 3 ===
| Home | Score | Away | Match information |
| Home | Score | Away | Date and time | Venue | Referee | Attendance |
|---|---|---|---|---|---|---|
Final Eliminator
| York City Knights | 24-32 | Hunslet Hawks | 28 September, 15:00 GMT | Huntington Stadium | George Stokes | 759 |

=== Week 4 ===
| Home | Score | Away | Match information |
| Home | Score | Away | Date and time | Venue | Referee | Attendance |
|---|---|---|---|---|---|---|
2014 Grand Final
| Oldham R.L.F.C. | 16-17 | Hunslet Hawks | 5 October, 16:05 GMT | Headingley Stadium | Joe Cobb | 9,167 |

=== Play-off ladder ===
Qualifying play-off 12 September 2014
Hunslet Hawks | 24
Oldham R.L.F.C. | 25
Gateshead Thunder | 15
Hemel Stags | 14

Qualifying semi-final 21 September 2014
York City Knights | 12
Oldham R.L.F.C. | 31
Elimination semi-final 21 September 2014
Hunslet Hawks | 50
Gateshead Thunder | 6

Preliminary final
York City Knights | 24
Hunslet Hawks | 32

2014 Grand Final; 5 October 2014, Leeds
Oldham R.L.F.C. | 16
Hunslet Hawks | 17
