= 2012 RFL Championship season results =

This is a list of the 2012 RFL Championship season results. The Championship is the second-tier rugby league competition in the United Kingdom. The 2012 season started on 8 March and ended on 30 September with the grand final at the Halliwell Jones Stadium in Warrington. The 2012 season is the last season to consist of a 10-team division, with the league expanding to 12 teams for 2013 with the inclusion of the top 4 teams from the 2012 Championship 1 season, Barrow Raiders, Doncaster, Whitehaven, and Workington Town.

The 2012 season consisted of two stages. The regular season was played over 18 round-robin fixtures, in which each of the fourteen teams involved in the competition played each other once at home and once away. In the Championship, a win was worth three points in the table, a draw worth two points apiece, and a loss by less than 12 points during the game earned one bonus point. Defeats by more than 12 points yielded no points.

The Championship was decided through the second stage of the season, the play-offs. The top six teams in the table contested to play in the grand final, the winners of which were crowned champions.

== Regular season ==
=== Round 1 ===
Home	Score	Away	Match Information
Home	Score	Away	Date and Time	Venue	Referee	Attendance
Leigh Centurions	18–24	Batley Bulldogs	8 March, 19:30 GMT	Leigh Sports Village	Matt Thomason	1,663
Keighley Cougars	12–22	Featherstone Rovers	10 March, 14:00 GMT	Cougar Park	Gareth Hewer	1,621
Dewsbury Rams	30–10	York City Knights	10 March, 15:00 GMT	Tetley's Stadium	Ronnie Laughton	1,059
Halifax	44–18	Hunslet Hawks	10 March, 15:00 GMT	The Shay	Tim Roby	2,052
Sheffield Eagles	56–22	Swinton Lions	10 March, 15:00 GMT	Don Valley Stadium	Jamie Leahy	1,815

=== Round 2 ===
Home	Score	Away	Match Information
Home	Score	Away	Date and Time	Venue	Referee	Attendance
Featherstone Rovers	36–16	Leigh Centurions	15 March, 19:30 GMT	Bigfellas Stadium	Steve Maden	2,382
Batley Bulldogs	8–10	Keighley Cougars	18 March, 14:00 GMT	Mount Pleasant	Clint Sharrad	848
Swinton Lions	16–34	Dewsbury Rams	18 March, 14:00 GMT	Leigh Sports Village	Tim Roby	654
Hunslet Hawks	22–40	Sheffield Eagles	18 March, 15:00 GMT	South Leeds Stadium	Matt Thomason	419
York City Knights	18–24	Halifax	18 March, 15:00 GMT	Huntington Stadium	Gareth Hewer	967

=== Round 3 ===
Home	Score	Away	Match Information
Home	Score	Away	Date and Time	Venue	Referee	Attendance
Sheffield Eagles	18–50	Halifax	29 March, 19:30 BST	Bramall Lane	Gareth Hewer	1,412
Leigh Centurions	36–6	York City Knights	30 March, 20:00 BST	Leigh Sports Village	Jamie Leahy	1,700
Keighley Cougars	48–6	Hunslet Hawks	1 April, 14:00 BST	Cougar Park	Ronnie Laughton	1,069
Swinton Lions	26–18	Batley Bulldogs	1 April, 14:00 BST	Leigh Sports Village	Matt Thomason	707
Dewsbury Rams	12–24	Featherstone Rovers	1 April, 15:00 GMT	Tetley's Stadium	George Stokes	1,597

=== Round 4 ===
Home	Score	Away	Match Information
Home	Score	Away	Date and Time	Venue	Referee	Attendance
Leigh Centurions	38–4	Swinton Lions	6 April, 12:00 BST	Leigh Sports Village	Ronnie Laughton	2,135
Batley Bulldogs	18–16	Dewsbury Rams	6 April, 19:30 BST	Mount Pleasant	Clint Sharrad	1,353
Halifax	13–12	Keighley Cougars	6 April, 19:30 BST	The Shay	Jamie Leahy	2,378
Featherstone Rovers	40–60	Sheffield Eagles	7 April, 18:00 BST	Bigfellas Stadium	Tim Roby	2,293
Hunslet Hawks	20–6	York City Knights	8 April, 15:00 BST	South Leeds Stadium	Warren Turley	505

=== Round 5 ===
Home	Score	Away	Match Information
Home	Score	Away	Date and Time	Venue	Referee	Attendance
Halifax	18–32	Leigh Centurions	19 April, 19:30 BST	The Shay	George Stokes	2,062
Keighley Cougars	23–16	Sheffield Eagles	22 April, 14:00 BST	Cougar Park	Matt Thomason	948
Swinton Lions	24–26	Featherstone Rovers	22 April, 14:00 BST	Leigh Sports Village	Clint Sharrad	866
Dewsbury Rams	16–8	Hunslet Hawks	22 April, 15:00 BST	Tetley's Stadium	Gareth Hewer	850
York City Knights	16–30	Batley Bulldogs	22 April, 15:00 BST	Huntington Stadium	Jamie Leahy	691

=== Round 6 ===
Home	Score	Away	Match Information
Home	Score	Away	Date and Time	Venue	Referee	Attendance
Swinton Lions	32–12	York City Knights	6 May, 12:00 BST	Leigh Sports Village	George Stokes	410
Dewsbury Rams	29–22	Keighley Cougars	6 May, 15:00 BST	Tetley's Stadium	Ronnie Laughton	992
Featherstone Rovers	12–60	Halifax	6 May, 15:00 BST	Bigfellas Stadium	Tim Roby	2,806
Hunslet Hawks	0–48	Batley Bulldogs	6 May, 15:00 BST	South Leeds Stadium	Dave Merrick	506
Sheffield Eagles	32–34	Leigh Centurions	6 May, 15:00 BST	Don Valley Stadium	Jamie Leahy	1,237

=== Round 7 ===
Home	Score	Away	Match Information
Home	Score	Away	Date and Time	Venue	Referee	Attendance
York City Knights	18–25	Sheffield Eagles	10 May, 19:30 BST	Huntington Stadium	Gareth Hewer	462
Batley Bulldogs	24–31	Featherstone Rovers	13 May, 14:00 BST	Mount Pleasant	Matt Thomason	1,317
Halifax	50–22	Dewsbury Rams	13 May, 15:00 BST	The Shay	Jamie Leahy	2,377
Hunslet Hawks	12–38	Swinton Lions	13 May, 15:00 BST	South Leeds Stadium	Ronnie Laughton	426
Leigh Centurions	40–14	Keighley Cougars	23 August, 19:45 BST^{A}	Leigh Sports Village	Gareth Hewer	1,597

=== Round 8 ===
Home	Score	Away	Match Information
Home	Score	Away	Date and Time	Venue	Referee	Attendance
Keighley Cougars	36–4	Swinton Lions	17 May, 19:30 BST	Cougar Stadium	Jamie Leahy	716
Sheffield Eagles	42–10	Dewsbury Rams	18 May, 19:30 BST	Bramall Lane	Dave Merrick	1,154
Featherstone Rovers	34–14	York City Knights	19 May, 18:00 BST	Bigfellas Stadium	Ronnie Laughton	1,610
Batley Bulldogs	23–16	Halifax	20 May, 14:00 BST	Mount Pleasant	George Stokes	1,553
Leigh Centurions	30–10	Hunslet Hawks	20 May, 15:00 BST	Leigh Sports Village	Dave Merrick	1,716

=== Round 9 ===
Home	Score	Away	Match Information
Home	Score	Away	Date and Time	Venue	Referee	Attendance
Sheffield Eagles	26–16	Batley Bulldogs	24 May, 19:30 BST	Bramall Lane	Ronnie Laughton	1,117
Swinton Lions	18–24	Halifax	25 May, 20:00 BST	Leigh Sports Village	Jamie Leahy	822
Dewsbury Rams	18–34	Leigh Centurions	27 May, 15:00 BST	Tetley's Stadium	Gareth Hewer	922
Hunslet Hawks	10–54	Featherstone Rovers	27 May, 15:00 BST	South Leeds Stadium	Matthew Kidd	724
York City Knights	18–42	Keighley Cougars	27 May, 15:00 BST	Huntington Stadium	Dave Merrick	918

=== Round 10 ===
Home	Score	Away	Match Information
Home	Score	Away	Date and Time	Venue	Referee	Attendance
Leigh Centurions	40–12	Sheffield Eagles	7 June, 19:30 BST	Leigh Sports Village	George Stokes	1,645
Batley Bulldogs	56–10	Hunslet Hawks	10 June, 14:00 BST	Mount Pleasant	Jamie Leahy	705
Keighley Cougars	16–30	Halifax	10 June, 14:00 BST	Cougar Park	Clint Sharrad	1,723
Featherstone Rovers	60–18	Dewsbury Rams	10 June, 15:00 BST	Bigfellas Stadium	Ronnie Laughton	2,241
York City Knights	26–22	Swinton Lions	10 June, 15:00 BST	Huntington Stadium	Gareth Hewer	641

=== Round 11 ===
Home	Score	Away	Match Information
Home	Score	Away	Date and Time	Venue	Referee	Attendance
Dewsbury Rams	24–34	Halifax	21 June, 19:30 BST	Tetley's Stadium	Clint Sherrard	1,092
Leigh Centurions	16–22	Featherstone Rovers	22 June, 19:30 BST	Leigh Sports Village	Gareth Hewer	1,837
Sheffield Eagles	44–10	York City Knights	22 June, 19:30 BST	Don Valley Stadium	Jamie Leahy	784
Swinton Lions	36–22	Hunslet Hawks	24 June, 14:00 BST	Leigh Sports Village	Chris Leatherbarrow	567
Keighley Cougars	30–34	Batley Bulldogs	24 June, 17:00 BST	Cougar Park	Ronnie Laughton	878

=== Round 12 ===
Home	Score	Away	Match Information
Home	Score	Away	Date and Time	Venue	Referee	Attendance
Halifax	4–24	Featherstone Rovers	28 June, 19:30 BST	The Shay	Matthew Thomasson	2,792
York City Knights	24–32	Dewsbury Rams	29 June, 20:00 BST	Huntington Stadium	Chris Leatherbarrow	906
Batley Bulldogs	42–20	Leigh Centurions	1 July, 14:00 BST	Mount Pleasant	George Stokes	1,003
Swinton Lions	24–32	Sheffield Eagles	1 July, 14:00 BST	Leigh Sports Village	Gareth Hewer	506
Hunslet Hawks	12–22	Keighley Cougars	1 July, 15:00 BST	South Leeds Stadium	Jamie Leahy	505

=== Round 13 ===
Home	Score	Away	Match Information
Home	Score	Away	Date and Time	Venue	Referee	Attendance
Batley Bulldogs	24–32	Sheffield Eagles	12 July, 19:30 BST	Mount Pleasant	George Stokes	874
Leigh Centurions	50–6	Dewsbury Rams	13 July, 19:30 BST	Leigh Sports Village	Matthew Thomasson	1,536
Keighley Cougars	46–24	York City Knights	15 July, 14:00 BST	Cougar Park	Ronnie Laughton	972
Featherstone Rovers	68–0	Hunslet Hawks	15 July, 15:00 BST	Bigfellas Stadium	Clint Sharrad	2,021
Halifax	50–28	Swinton Lions	15 July, 15:00 BST	The Shay	Gary Dewar	2,089

=== Round 14 ===
Home	Score	Away	Match Information
Home	Score	Away	Date and Time	Venue	Referee	Attendance
Sheffield Eagles	16–6	Keighley Cougars	20 July, 19:30 BST	Don Valley Stadium	Matt Thomason	854
Dewsbury Rams	32–24	Swinton Lions	22 July, 15:00 BST	Tetley's Stadium	Warren Turley	835
Featherstone Rovers	31–28	Batley Bulldogs	22 July, 15:00 BST	Bigfellas Stadium	Ronnie Laughton	2,304
Hunslet Hawks	22–52	Halifax	22 July, 15:00 BST	South Leeds Stadium	Dave Merrick	664
York City Knights	20–66	Leigh Centurions	22 July, 15:00 BST	Huntington Stadium	George Stokes	806

=== Round 15 ===
Home	Score	Away	Match Information
Home	Score	Away	Date and Time	Venue	Referee	Attendance
Batley Bulldogs	62–6	Swinton Lions	2 August, 19:30 BST	Mount Pleasant	Dave Merrick	720
York City Knights	12–40	Featherstone Rovers	3 August, 20:00 BST	Huntington Stadium	Gareth Hewer	1,015
Keighley Cougars	34–6	Dewsbury Rams	5 August, 14:00 BST	Cougar Park	Jamie Leahy	814
Halifax	30–26	Sheffield Eagles	5 August, 15:00 BST	The Shay	Chris Leatherbarrow	1,912
Hunslet Hawks	6–36	Leigh Centurions	5 August, 15:00 BST	South Leeds Stadium	Matt Thomason	408

=== Round 16 ===
Home	Score	Away	Match Information
Home	Score	Away	Date and Time	Venue	Referee	Attendance
Keighley Cougars	0–26	Leigh Centurions	9 August, 19:30 BST	Cougar Park	Jamie Leahy	831
Sheffield Eagles	30–20	Hunslet Hawks	10 August, 19:30 BST	Don Valley Stadium	M Thomas	777
Dewsbury Rams	12–26	Batley Bulldogs	12 August, 15:00 BST	Tetley's Stadium	Ronnie Laughton	1,703
Featherstone Rovers	86–12	Swinton Lions	12 August, 15:00 BST	Bigfellas Stadium	Warren Turley	2,068
Halifax	44–12	Leigh Centurions	12 August, 15:00 BST	The Shay	Clint Sharrad	1,989

=== Round 17 ===
Home	Score	Away	Match Information
Home	Score	Away	Date and Time	Venue	Referee	Attendance
Sheffield Eagles	28–28	Featherstone	16 August, 19:30 BST	Don Valley Stadium	Gareth Hewer	1,449
Leigh Centurions	32–28	Halifax	17 August, 19:30 BST	Leigh Sports Village	Tim Roby	2,122
Batley Bulldogs	50–0	York City Knights	19 August, 14:00 BST	Mount Pleasant	Matt Thomason	741
Swinton Lions	18–18	Keighley Cougars	19 August, 14:00 BST	Leigh Sports Village	Ronnie Laughton	515
Hunslet Hawks	22–34	Dewsbury Rams	19 August, 15:00 BST	South Leeds Stadium	Jamie Leahy	463

=== Round 18 ===
Home	Score	Away	Match Information
Home	Score	Away	Date and Time	Venue	Referee	Attendance
Swinton Lions	12–48	Leigh Centurions	2 September, 14:00 BST	Leigh Sports Village	Jamie Leahy	1,026
Dewsbury Rams	20–30	Sheffield Eagles	2 September, 15:00 BST	Tetley's Stadium	Warren Turley	1,156
Featherstone Rovers	46–4	Keighley Cougars	2 September, 15:00 BST	Bigfellas Stadium	Dave Merrick	2,816
Halifax	26–20	Batley Bulldogs	2 September, 15:00 BST	The Shay	Matt Thomason	2,344
York City Knights	26–28	Hunslet Hawks	2 September, 15:00 BST	Huntington Stadium	Gareth Hewer	913

== Play-offs ==
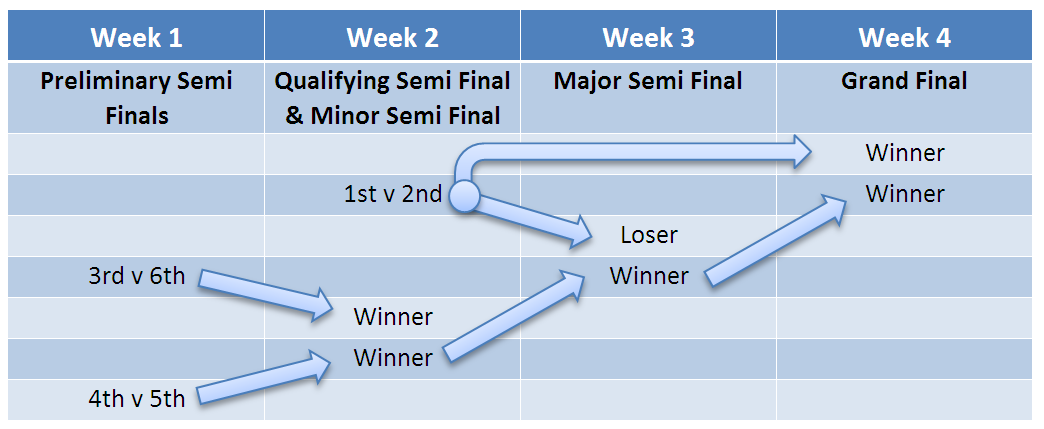
The 2012 Co-Operative Championship Play-Off structure

The play-offs commence following the conclusion of the regular season and include the top six sides from the league and uses a top 6 play-off system, culminating in the grand final at the Halliwell Jones Stadium in Warrington, home of Super League side Warrington Wolves.

=== Preliminary Semi-finals ===
#	Home	Score	Away	Match Information
#	Home	Score	Away	Date and Time	Venue	Referee	Attendance
P1	Halifax	28–24	Keighley Cougars	6 September 2012, 19:30 BST	The Shay	Jamie Leahy	1,203
P2	Sheffield Eagles	42–12	Batley Bulldogs	9 September 2012, 15:00 BST	Don Valley Stadium	George Stokes	722

=== Qualifying and minor semi-final ===
#	Home	Score	Away	Match Information
#	Home	Score	Away	Date and Time	Venue	Referee	Attendance
QS	Featherstone Rovers	32–14	Leigh Centurions	13 September 2012, 19:30 BST	Bigfellas Stadium	George Stokes	1,828
MS	Halifax	12–54	Sheffield Eagles	16 September 2012, 13:30 BST	The Shay	Tim Roby	1,514

=== Major semi-final ===
#	Home	Score	Away	Match Information
#	Home	Score	Away	Date and Time	Venue	Referee	Attendance
SF	Leigh Centurions	22–32	Sheffield Eagles	20 September 2012, 19:30 BST	Leigh Sports Village	Tim Roby	1,725

=== Grand final ===
#	Home	Score	Away	Match Information
#	Home	Score	Away	Date and Time	Venue	Referee	Attendance
GF	Featherstone Rovers	16–20	Sheffield Eagles	30 September 2012, 16:30 BST	Halliwell Jones Stadium, Warrington	Tim Roby	6,409

=== Play-off ladder ===
Elimination finals
9 September 2012
3	Halifax	28
6	Keighley Cougars	24
9 September 2012
4	Sheffield Eagles	42
5	Batley Bulldogs	12

QualifyingElimination semifinal
13 September 2012
1	Featherstone Rovers	32
2	Leigh Centurions	14
16 September 2012
Halifax	12
Sheffield Eagles	54

Elimination final
20 September 2012
Leigh Centurions	22
Sheffield Eagles	32

Grand final
30 September 2012, Halliwell Jones Stadium
Featherstone Rovers	16
Sheffield Eagles	20

=== Notes ===
A. Match re-arranged for August due to Leigh's Challenge Cup Quarter-final tie
