= Carl Forber =

English professional rugby league footballer

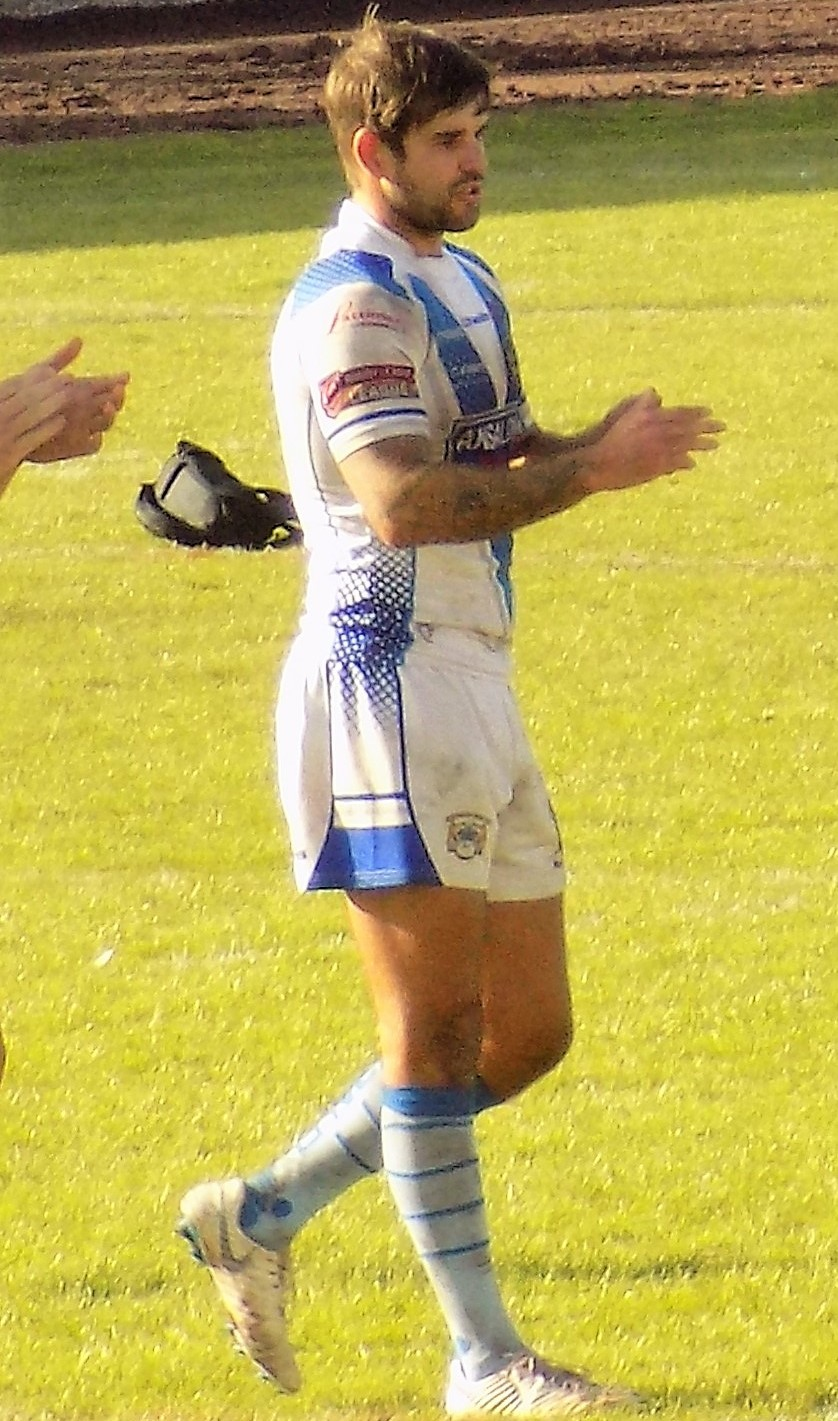

Personal information
- Full name: Carl Forber
- Born: 17 March 1985 (age 41) St Helens, Merseyside, England
- Height: 5 ft 8.5 in (1.740 m)
- Weight: 12 st 4 lb (78 kg)

Playing information
- Position: Scrum-half, Stand-off, Loose forward
Club
Years	Team	Pld	T	G	FG	P
2004	St Helens	2	0	6	0	12
2005–06	Leigh Centurions	30	14	36	0	128
2007–09	Workington Town	75	17	255	1	579
2009–10	Blackpool Panthers	39	16	27	0	118
2011	Swinton Lions	3	0	0	0	0
2011	Oldham	14	5	63	0	146
2012–24	Workington Town	248	48	671	4	1538
	Total	411	100	1058	5	2521
- Source: As of 11 November 2024

Carl Forber (born 17 March 1985) is an English former rugby league footballer who last played for Workington Town in League 1, as a goal-kicking scrum-half/stand-off. He has previously played for St Helens, Leigh Centurions and Oldham, although he only played twice in the Super League for St. Helens. He is now assistant coach at Workington Town.

== Playing career ==
Forber represented Workington Town for the majority of his league career. He has over 300 appearances and over 1,000 points, playing as an Stand Off. Much of his points tally has come from his right boot, converting for Workington time and again.

Forber earned a testimonial at Workington, where he was top points scorer in the 2017 League 1 rugby season. Forber is prolific with the boot. A place kick specialist. Forber has been a central player for Town in achieving playoff places over the years for the Betfred League 1 and a top scorer for the team during their successful 2021 Betfred Championship promotion season.
