= Bryn Powell =

Wales international rugby league footballer

Personal information
- Born: 5 September 1979 (age 46)

Playing information
- Position: Wing
Club
Years	Team	Pld	T	G	FG	P
2002–03	Hunslet Hawks	63	49	0	0	196
2004	Salford City Reds	2	0	0	0	0
2004	Batley Bulldogs	14	8	0	0	32
2005	Featherstone Rovers	27	11	0	0	44
2006–10	Dewsbury Rams	117	63	1	0	250
2011	Featherstone Rovers	25	23	0	0	92
	Total	248	154	1	0	614
Representative
Years	Team	Pld	T	G	FG	P
2004–06	Wales	6	3	0	0	12

Bryn Powell (born 5 September 1979) is a Wales international rugby league footballer who played as a professional for Hunslet Hawks, Salford City Reds, Featherstone Rovers (two spells), Dewsbury Rams in National League One. Powell's preferred position was as a wing.

== Career ==
Powell started his professional career at Hunslet Hawks. In 2004, Powell played two Super League games for Salford City Reds. After one season at Featherstone Rovers, he moved to Dewsbury Rams, where he spent several years.

Bryn Powell made his début for Featherstone Rovers on Sunday 13 February 2005, and he played his last match for Featherstone Rovers, in his second spell, during the 2011 season.

Powell also represented Wales at international level, and was capped six times between 2004 and 2006. He was named in the Wales squad to face England at the Keepmoat Stadium prior to England's departure for the 2008 Rugby League World Cup, but had to withdraw.
