= 2011 Championship Cup =

- Teams: 20

2011 Season

The 2011 Championship Cup, (known for commercial reasons as the Northern Rail Cup), was the 10th season of the rugby league football competition for clubs in Great Britain's Co-operative Championship and Championship One.

Leigh Centurions won the final against Halifax by the score of 20–16. The match was played at Bloomfield Road in Blackpool.

== Format ==
The twenty teams are split up into two pools.

Pool A: Featherstone Rovers, Doncaster, London Skolars, Widnes Vikings, Toulouse Olympique, York City Knights, Keighley Cougars, Barrow Raiders, Rochdale Hornets, Dewsbury Rams.

Pool B: Swinton Lions, Halifax RLFC, Batley Bulldogs, Leigh Centurions, Gateshead Thunder, Sheffield Eagles, Oldham, Hunslet Hawks, Workington Town, Whitehaven RLFC.

Each team played two home games and two away games against teams in their pool. The top four teams in each pool following the conclusion of the group stage fixtures progressed into an open draw for the knock-out quarter-final stage. The competition started on 5 February.

Toulouse Olympique competed in the competition for the first time after the withdrawal of Blackpool Panthers who have entered administration. The South Wales Scorpions did not compete.

== 2011 Competition results ==
=== Pool 1 ===
==== Round 1 ====
Home	Score	Away	Match Information			
Home	Score	Away	Date & Time	Referee	Venue	Attendance
Featherstone Rovers	54–10	Doncaster	4 February, 19:30 GMT		Big Fellas Stadium	1,223
Toulouse Olympique	40–38	Dewsbury Rams	5 February, 16:00 GMT		Arnaune Stadium	800
London Skolars	18–62	Widnes Vikings	6 February, 15:00 GMT		New River Stadium	643
Keighley Cougars	24–6	Rochdale Hornets	6 February, 15:00 GMT		Cougar Park	627
Barrow Raiders	24–20	York City Knights	6 February, 14:00 GMT		The Furness Heating Components Stadium	1,305

==== Round 2 ====
Home	Score	Away	Match Information			
Home	Score	Away	Date & Time	Referee	Venue	Attendance
Widnes Vikings	44–28	Toulouse Olympique	12 February, 18:00 GMT		Stobart Stadium Halton	2,376
Doncaster	32–4	London Skolars	13 February, 15:00 GMT		Keepmoat Stadium	-
York City Knights	22–32	Featherstone Rovers	13 February, 15:00 GMT		Huntington Stadium	1,387
Dewsbury Rams	14–0	Keighley Cougars	13 February, 15:00 GMT		Tetley's Stadium	758
Rochdale Hornets	18–30	Barrow Raiders	13 February, 15:00 GMT		Spotland Stadium	-

==== Round 3 ====
Home	Score	Away	Match Information			
Home	Score	Away	Date & Time	Referee	Venue	Attendance
Keighley Cougars	22–36	Toulouse Olympique	19 February, 18:00 GMT		Cougar Park	513
London Skolars	16–16	York City Knights	20 February, 15:00 GMT		New River Stadium	264
Doncaster	18–30	Dewsbury Rams	20 February, 15:00 GMT		Keepmoat Stadium	555
Widnes Vikings	50–10	Rochdale Hornets	20 February, 15:00 GMT		Stobart Stadium Halton	3,155
Barrow Raiders	22–28	Featherstone Rovers	20 February, 14:00 GMT		The Furness Heating Components Stadium	1,852

==== Round 4 ====
Home	Score	Away	Match Information			
Home	Score	Away	Date & Time	Referee	Venue	Attendance
Toulouse Olympique	34–22	London Skolars	26 February, 15:00 GMT		Arnaune Stadium	998
Featherstone Rovers	16–22	Widnes Vikings	26 February, 18:00 GMT		Big Fellas Stadium	1,719
Rochdale Hornets	36–40	Doncaster	27 February, 15:00 GMT		Spotland Stadium	442
York City Knights	28–22	Keighley Cougars	27 February, 15:00 GMT		Huntington Stadium	748
Dewsbury Rams	16–12	Barrow Raiders	27 February, 15:00 GMT		Tetley's Stadium	911

==== Pool 1 Qualification Table ====
2011 Northern Rail Cup: Pool 1
#		PLD	W	D	L	PF	PA	PD	BP	PTS
1	Widnes Vikings	4	4	0	0	178	72	+106	0	12
2	Featherstone Rovers	4	3	0	1	130	76	+54	1	10
3	Dewsbury Rams	4	3	0	1	98	70	+28	1	10
4	Toulouse Olympique	4	3	0	1	138	126	+12	0	9
5	Barrow Raiders	4	2	0	2	88	82	+6	2	8
6	York City Knights	4	1	1	2	86	94	−8	2	7
7	Doncaster	4	2	0	2	100	124	-24	1	7
8	Keighley Cougars	4	1	0	3	68	84	−16	1	4
9	London Skolars	4	0	1	3	60	144	−84	1	3
10	Rochdale Hornets	4	0	0	4	70	144	−74	2	2

Teams qualifying for the next round

Source: Northern Rail Cup Table – The RFL
Classification: 1st on competition points; 2nd on match points difference.
Competition Points: For win = 3; For draw = 2; For loss by 12 points or fewer = 1

=== Pool 2 ===
==== Round 1 ====
Home	Score	Away	Match Information			
Home	Score	Away	Date & Time	Referee	Venue	Attendance
Swinton Lions	22–28	Halifax	4 February, 20:00 GMT		The Willows	1,000
Oldham	28–22	Hunslet Hawks	6 February, 15:00 GMT		Whitebank Stadium	685
Gateshead Thunder	20–32	Sheffield Eagles	6 February, 15:00 GMT		Gateshead International Stadium	444
Batley Bulldogs	4–24	Leigh Centurions	6 February, 14:00 GMT		Mount Pleasant	1,072
Whitehaven	18–28	Workington Town	8 February, 19:30 GMT		Recreation Ground	1,005

==== Round 2 ====
Home	Score	Away	Match Information			
Home	Score	Away	Date & Time	Referee	Venue	Attendance
Workington Town	82–0	Gateshead Thunder	13 February, 15:00 GMT		Derwent Park	381
Sheffield Eagles	16–16	Whitehaven	13 February, 15:00 GMT		Bramall Lane	727
Leigh Centurions	42–22	Swinton Lions	13 February, 15:00 GMT		Leigh Sports Village	1,623
Halifax	50–10	Oldham	13 February, 15:00 GMT		The Shay	2,027
Hunslet Hawks	8–12	Batley Bulldogs	13 February, 15:00 GMT		South Leeds Stadium	666

==== Round 3 ====
Home	Score	Away	Match Information			
Home	Score	Away	Date & Time	Referee	Venue	Attendance
Swinton Lions	29–20	Oldham R.L.F.C.	20 February, 15:00 GMT		The Willows	776
Leigh Centurions	68–6	Sheffield Eagles	20 February, 15:00 GMT		Leigh Sports Village	1,520
Hunslet Hawks	30–0	Workington Town	20 February, 15:00 GMT		South Leeds Stadium	379
Batley Bulldogs	60–6	Gateshead Thunder	20 February, 14:00 GMT		Mount Pleasant Stadium	612
Whitehaven	6–60	Halifax	16 March, 19:30 GMT		Recreation Ground	771

==== Round 4 ====
Home	Score	Away	Match Information			
Home	Score	Away	Date & Time	Referee	Venue	Attendance
Workington Town	12–42	Leigh Centurions	27 February, 15:00 GMT		Derwent Park	592
Oldham R.L.F.C.	4–14	Whitehaven	27 February, 15:00 GMT		Whitebank Stadium	544
Gateshead Thunder	4–76	Swinton Lions	27 February, 15:00 GMT		Gateshead International Stadium	323
Sheffield Eagles	12–16	Hunslet Hawks	27 February, 15:00 GMT		Bramall Lane	854
Halifax	25–26	Batley Bulldogs	27 February, 15:00 GMT		The Shay	1,968

==== Pool 2 Qualification Table ====
2011 Northern Rail Cup: Pool 2
#		PLD	W	D	L	PF	PA	PD	BP	PTS
1	Leigh Centurions	4	4	0	0	176	44	+132	0	12
2	Halifax	4	3	0	1	163	64	+99	1	10
3	Batley Bulldogs	4	3	0	1	102	63	+39	0	9
4	Hunslet Hawks	4	2	0	2	76	52	24	2	8
5	Swinton Lions	4	2	0	2	149	94	+55	1	7
6	Workington Town	4	2	0	2	122	90	+32	0	6
7	Sheffield Eagles	4	1	1	2	66	120	-54	1	6
8	Whitehaven	4	1	1	2	54	108	−54	1	6
9	Oldham R.L.F.C.	4	1	0	3	62	115	−53	2	5
10	Gateshead Thunder	4	0	0	4	30	250	−220	1	1

Teams qualifying for the next round

Source: Northern Rail Cup Table – The RFL
Classification: 1st on competition points; 2nd on match points difference.
Competition Points: For win = 3; For draw = 2; For loss by 12 points or fewer = 1

=== Finals ===
==== Finals Tournament Bracket ====
Quarter-finals
H	Leigh Centurions	50
A	Widnes Vikings	18
H	Hunslet Hawks	12
A	Featherstone Rovers	50
H	Toulouse Olympique XIII	26
A	Halifax RLFC	36
H	Dewsbury Rams	38
A	Batley Bulldogs	22

Semi-finals
H	Featherstone Rovers	30
A	Halifax RLFC	31
H	Leigh Centurions	44
A	Dewsbury Rams	10

Final
H	Halifax RLFC	16
A	Leigh Centurions	20

==== Quarter-finals ====
Home	Score	Away	Match Information			
Home	Score	Away	Date & Time	Referee	Venue	Attendance
Leigh Centurions	50–18	Widnes Vikings	19:30, 7 April 2011		Leigh Sports Village	2,737
Hunslet Hawks	12–50	Featherstone Rovers	20:00 8 April 2011		South Leeds Stadium	877
Toulouse Olympique	26–36	Halifax RLFC	19:00 9 April 2011		Stade de Minimes	850
Dewsbury Rams	38–22	Batley Bulldogs	15:00 10 April 2011		Tetley's Stadium	1,643

==== Semi-finals ====
The semi-finals took place on 16 and 19 June with Sky Sports broadcasting the Featherstone v Halifax game live on Thursday 16 June.

Home	Score	Away	Match Information			
Home	Score	Away	Date & Time	Referee	Venue	Attendance
Featherstone Rovers	30–31	Halifax RLFC	Thursday 16 June 2011, 19:30 KO	Gareth Hewer	Big Fellas Stadium	1,987
Leigh Centurions	44–10	Dewsbury Rams	Sunday 19 June 2011, 15:00 KO	Matt Thompson	Leigh Sports Village	2,234

==== Final ====
The Northern Rail Cup Final took place at Bloomfield Road, Blackpool on Sunday 17 July at 17:00 GMT live on Sky Sports 3. The Match was contested by Halifax RLFC and Leigh Centurions.

This was Halifax's first appearance in the National League Cup final and was he fourth time Leigh have appeared in the final after making the finals in 2003 and winning the final in 2004 & 2006.

The game was won by Leigh 20 points to 16 with Leigh scoring in the final minute thanks to Tom Armstrong. The victory fulfils the on-field criteria that clubs must meet to be allowed to apply for a Super League licence for the 2015–17 period. Leigh Centurions have become the first club to have won the competition on 3 occasions.

Home	Score	Away	Match Information			
Home	Score	Away	Date & Time	Referee	Venue	Attendance
Halifax RLFC	16–20	Leigh Centurions	Sunday, 17 July 2011, 17:00 KO	Matt Thomason	Bloomfield Road, Blackpool	8,522
