= Huntington Stadium =

Stadium in York, England

- Interactive map of Huntington Stadium
- Full name: Huntington Stadium
- Former names: Ryedale Stadium
- Location: Huntington, York, England
- Coordinates: 53°59′5″N 1°03′12″W
- Capacity: 3,428
- Surface: Grass
- Record attendance: 4,977 vs Halifax; 5 January 1990

Construction
- Built: 1989
- Opened: 1989
- Closed: 2014
- Main contractor: Birse Construction Ltd

Tenants
- York Wasps (1989–2002); York City Knights (2003–2014)

Huntington Stadium (formerly Ryedale Stadium) is the former stadium of English rugby league teams York Wasps, and York City Knights.

== History ==
The stadium, which was financed by the Ryedale District Council and was initially named the Ryedale Stadium, was completed in October 1989.

York Wasps played their first ever match at the Huntington Stadium when they lost to Hull Kingston Rovers 36–26 in front of a crowd of 3,105.

2009 saw the first game at the stadium to be televised live on Sky Sports. York were victorious as they beat Oldham 20–18 to go second in the Championship.

The 2014 season was announced as the final season at the stadium for the York City Knights. They won the league and lifted the trophy at the final home league game against London Skolars. The final game at Huntington Stadium ended in a 32–24 defeat for the York City Knights by Hunslet Hawks in the Championship 1 Play Off Semi Final.

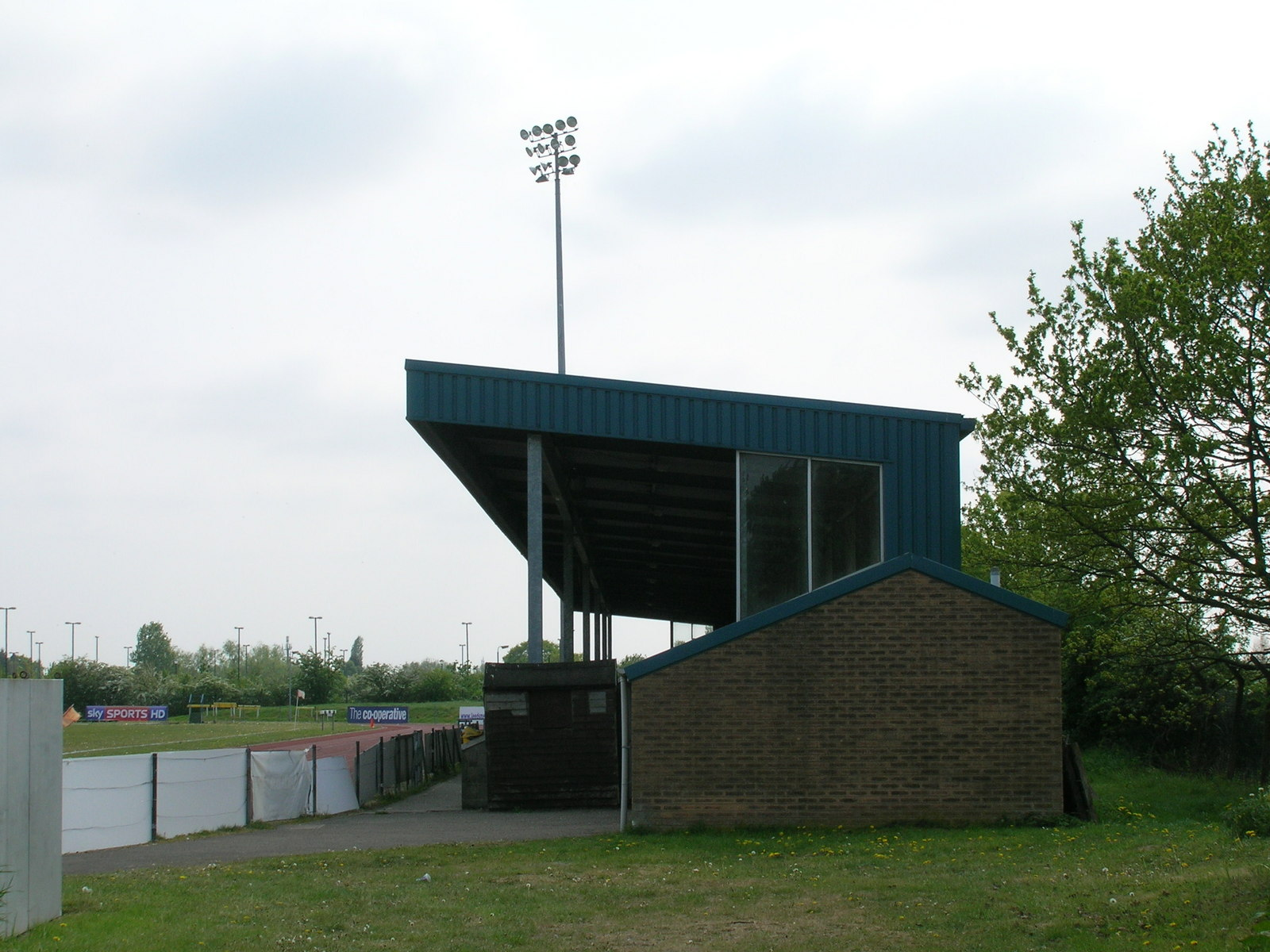
Spectator stands

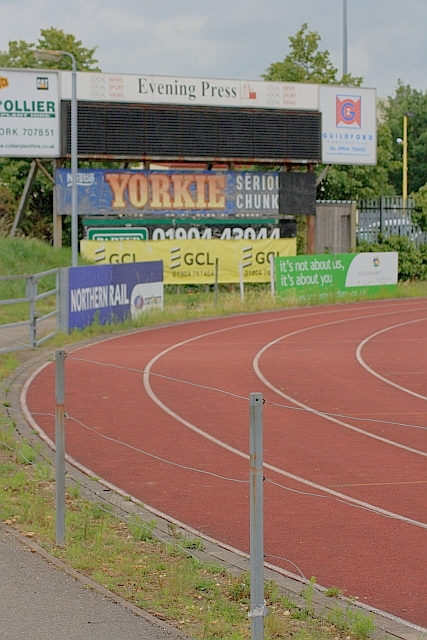
Scoreboard

== Demolition and replacement ==
It had long been proposed that the Knights should share a new municipal stadium with York City F.C. and it was announced in July 2010 that the preferred location would be the site of the current Huntington Stadium.

A community archaeology project was undertaken by York Archaeological Trust in 2015 to record the site of a Roman Marching Camp Site. The work of the local community project "Dig York Stadium" produced a historical record.

After the York Dig had concluded on 19 June 2015 it appeared that demolition of Huntington Stadium would be able to commence. However, the project faced more delays after a legal challenge to its planning application.

The new municipal stadium, York Community Stadium, completed in December 2020.
