= Finley Glare =

Papua New Guinea international rugby league footballer

Fin Glare
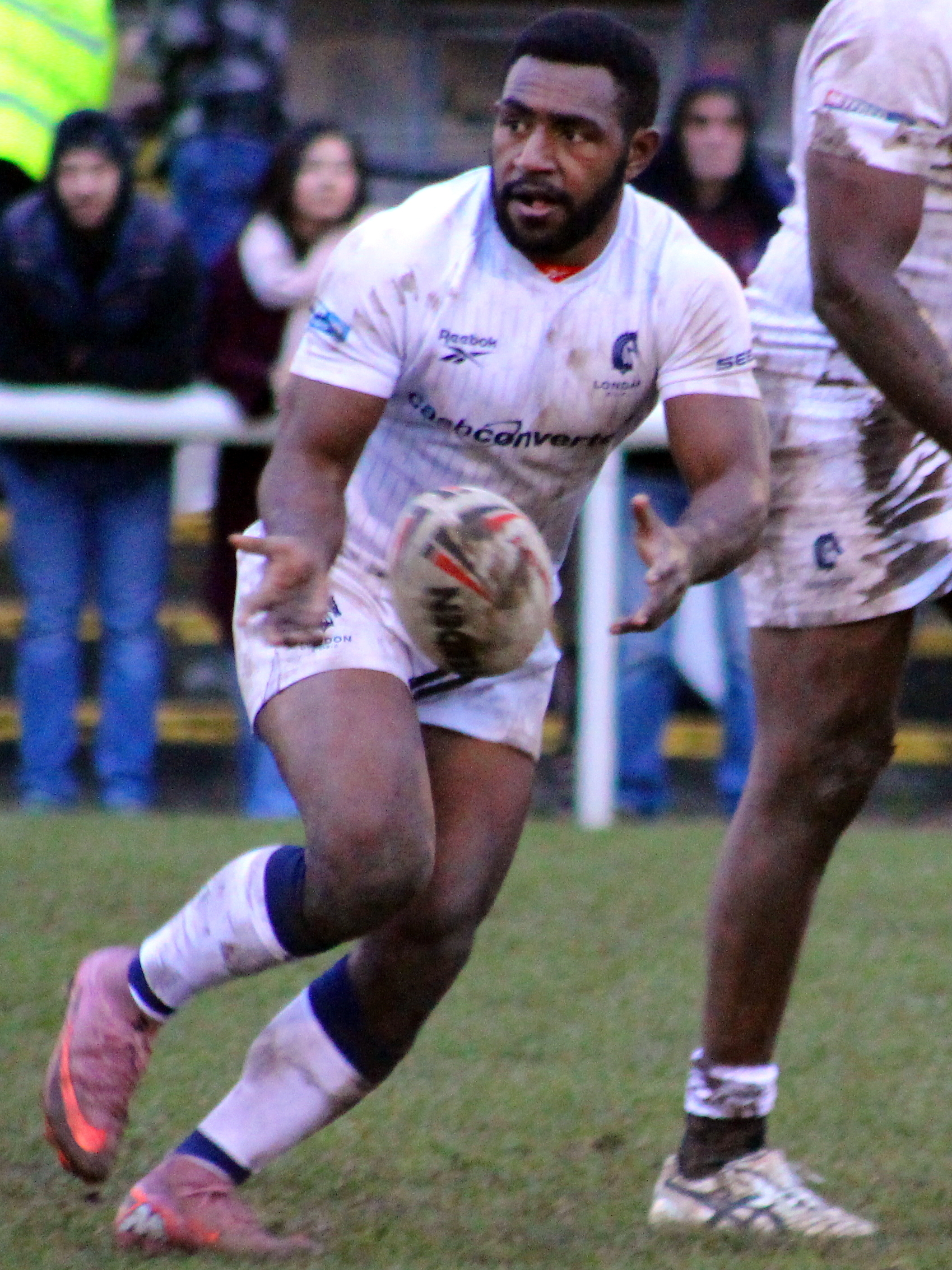

Personal information
- Full name: Finley Glare
- Born: 11 October 2003 (age 23) Lae, Morobe Province, Papua New Guinea
- Height: 5 ft 7 in (1.70 m)
- Weight: 13 st 3 lb (84 kg)

Playing information
- Position: Hooker, Stand-off, Scrum-half
Club
Years	Team	Pld	T	G	FG	P
2024–25	PNG Hunters	36	8	8	0	48
2026–	London Broncos	24	18	0	0	72
	Total	60	26	8	0	120
Representative
Years	Team	Pld	T	G	FG	P
2024–	PNG Prime Minister's XIII	2	1	0	0	4
2025–	Papua New Guinea	5	1	0	0	4
- Source: As of 19 November 2026

Finley Glare (born 11 October 2003) is a Papua New Guinean professional rugby league footballer who plays as a hooker, stand-off or scrum-half for the London Broncos in the Super League and Papua New Guinea at international level.

He previously played for the PNG Hunters in the QLD Cup.

Glare will join the Papua New Guinea Chiefs ahead of the 2028 NRL season.

== Early life ==
Glare was born in Lae in the Morobe Province, Papua New Guinea in 2003. His brother Warren Hunter is a former PNG Hunters player.

He played for the East Taraka Spiders in a local competition in Lae. He later signed with the Lae Snax Tigers in the PNGNRL Digicel-ExxonMobil Cup, the highest level of competition in Papua New Guinea.

== Career ==
=== Club career ===
==== PNG Hunters ====
Glare made his PNG Hunters debut against the Central Queensland Capras in the QLD Cup in 2024.

==== London Broncos ====
On 6 November 2025 it was reported that he had signed for the London Broncos in the RFL Championship.

In August 2026, he was part of the Broncos squad that lifted the RFL Championship Leaders' Shield.

He played in London's 1895 Cup Final victory over the Widnes Vikings at the Halliwell Jones Stadium in August 2026.

Glare warming up for London in 2026

In October 2026, he played in the Broncos Championship Grand Final victory over Doncaster at Plough Lane.

=== International ===
==== Junior Kumuls ====
Glare captained the Junior Kumuls against the Australian Schoolboys team.

==== PNG Prime Minister's XIII ====
He made his debut for the PNG Prime Minister's XIII against the Australian Prime Minister's XIII in 2024.

==== Papua New Guinea ====
Glare made his international debut for Papua New Guinea in their 22–12 victory over the Cook Islands in October 2025.

== Club statistics ==
Year	Club	League Competition	Appearances	Tries	Goals	Drop goals	Points	Notes
2024	Papua New Guinea Hunters	2024 Queensland Cup	20	7	6	0	40	
2025	Papua New Guinea Hunters	2025 Queensland Cup	16	1	2	0	8	
2026	London Broncos	2026 RFL Championship	24	18	0	0	72	
Club career total			60	26	8	0	120	
