= Morea Morea =

PNG international rugby league footballer

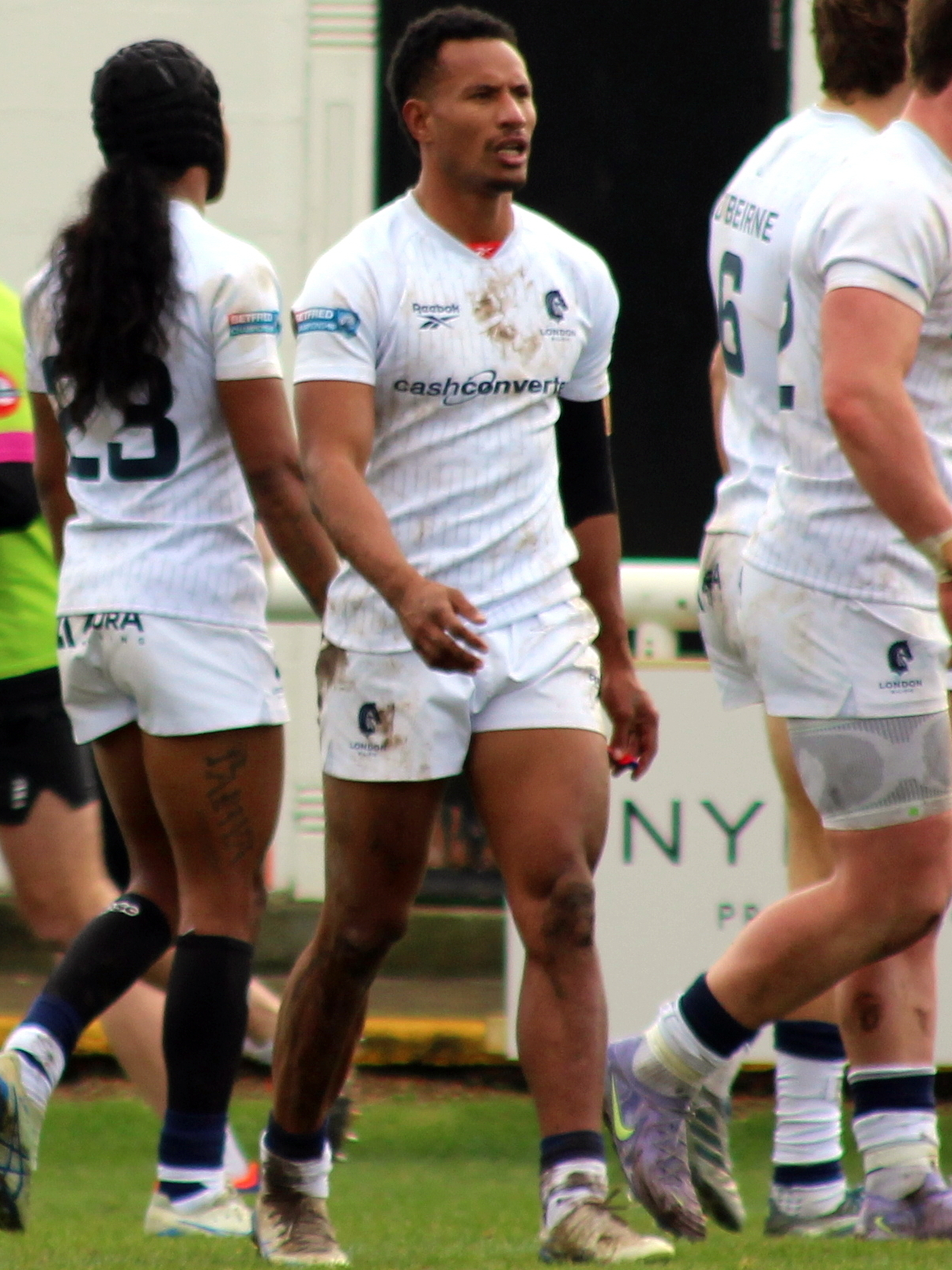

Personal information
- Full name: Morea Morea Jnr
- Born: 3 June 2001 (age 25) Papa, Central Province, Papua New Guinea
- Height: 5 ft 9 in (1.74 m)
- Weight: 11 st 9 lb (74 kg)

Playing information
- Position: Fullback
Club
Years	Team	Pld	T	G	FG	P
2023–25	PNG Hunters	23	11	9	0	62
2025	Central Qld Capras	9	3	2	0	16
2026–	London Broncos	19	29	1	0	118
	Total	51	43	12	0	196
Representative
Years	Team	Pld	T	G	FG	P
2024–25	PNG Prime Minister's XIII	2	0	0	0	0
2024–	Papua New Guinea	5	3	0	0	12
- Source: As of 19 November 2026

Morea Morea (born 3 June 2001) is a Papua New Guinean professional rugby league footballer who plays as a fullback for the London Broncos in the Super League and Papua New Guinea at international level.

He previously played for the Central Queensland Capras in the QLD Cup.

Morea will join the Papua New Guinea Chiefs ahead of the 2028 NRL season.

== Background ==
Morea was born in Port Moresby, Papua New Guinea.

== Career ==
Morea won the Rookie of the Year award for the Queensland Cup in 2023.

Morea made his international debut for Papua New Guinea in their 42–20 victory over Cook Islands in the 2024 Pacific Test coming into the game in the 70th minute as 18th man after Koso Bandi Head Injury Assessment was activated.

On 12 October 2025 he played for the PNG Prime Minister's XIII in the 28-10 defeat to Australia’s Prime Minister's XIII in Port Moresby

=== London Broncos ===
On 7 November 2025 it was reported that he had joined the London Broncos in the RFL Championship for 2026.

In August 2026, he was part of the Broncos squad that lifted the RFL Championship Leaders' Shield.

In October 2026, he played in the Broncos Championship Grand Final victory over Doncaster at Plough Lane.

In 2026 he was part of the London Broncos squad that secured their historic treble of League Leaders' Shield, 1895 Cup and Grand Final victories.

== Club statistics ==
Year	Club	League Competition	Appearances	Tries	Goals	Drop goals	Points	Notes
2023	Papua New Guinea Hunters	2023 Queensland Cup	20	11	9	0	62	
2024	Papua New Guinea Hunters	2024 Queensland Cup	2	0	0	0	0	
2025	Papua New Guinea Hunters	2025 Queensland Cup	1	0	0	0	0	
2025	Central Queensland Capras	2025 Queensland Cup	9	3	2	0	16	
2026	London Broncos	2026 RFL Championship	19	29	1	0	118	
Club career total			51	43	12	0	196	
