= Robert Mathias (rugby league) =

Papua New Guinea international rugby league footballer

Rob Mathias
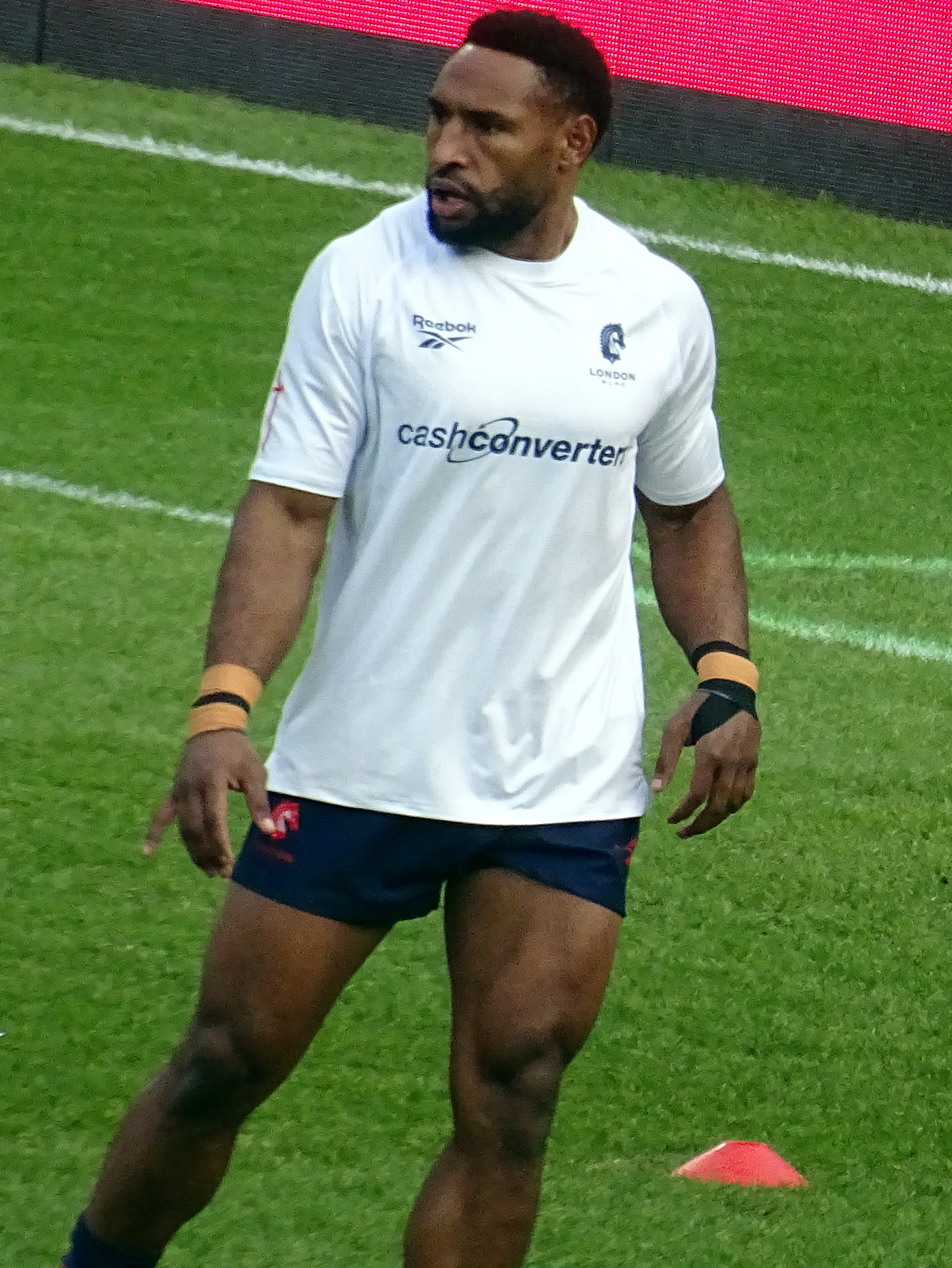

Personal information
- Full name: Robert Mathias
- Born: 4 April 2003 (age 23) Mount Hagen, Papua New Guinea
- Height: 6 ft 0 in (1.84 m)
- Weight: 16 st 12 lb (107 kg)

Playing information
- Position: Centre, Second-row
Club
Years	Team	Pld	T	G	FG	P
2024–25	PNG Hunters	31	10	0	0	40
2026–	London Broncos	16	18	0	0	72
	Total	47	28	0	0	112
Representative
Years	Team	Pld	T	G	FG	P
2024–25	PNG Prime Minister's XIII	2	1	0	0	4
2024–	Papua New Guinea	5	1	0	0	4
- Source: As of 19 November 2026

Robert Mathias (born 4 April 2003) is a Papua New Guinean professional rugby league footballer who plays as a centre or second-row forward for the London Broncos in the Super League and Papua New Guinea at international level.

He previously played for the PNG Hunters in the QLD Cup.

== Background ==
Mathias was born in Mount Hagen, Papua New Guinea.

== Career ==
=== Papua New Guinea Hunters ===
He played for the Papua New Guinea Hunters in the 2024 and 2025 Queensland Cup seasons.

=== London Broncos ===
On 10 November 2025 it was reported that he had signed for the London Broncos in the RFL Championship.

In August 2026, he was part of the Broncos squad that lifted the RFL Championship Leaders' Shield.

He played in London's 1895 Cup Final victory over the Widnes Vikings at the Halliwell Jones Stadium in August 2026.

In October 2026, he played in the Broncos Championship Grand Final victory over Doncaster at Plough Lane.

== International ==
Mathias made his international debut for Papua New Guinea in their 22–10 victory over Fiji Bati in the 2024 Pacific Test.

== Club statistics ==
Year	Club	League Competition	Appearances	Tries	Goals	Drop goals	Points	Notes
2024	Papua New Guinea Hunters	2024 Queensland Cup	11	3	0	0	12	
2025	Papua New Guinea Hunters	2025 Queensland Cup	20	7	0	0	28	
2026	London Broncos	2026 RFL Championship	16	18	0	0	72	
2027	London Broncos	2027 Super League						
Club career total			47	28	0	0	112	
