= Gairo Voro =

Papua New Guinea international rugby league footballer

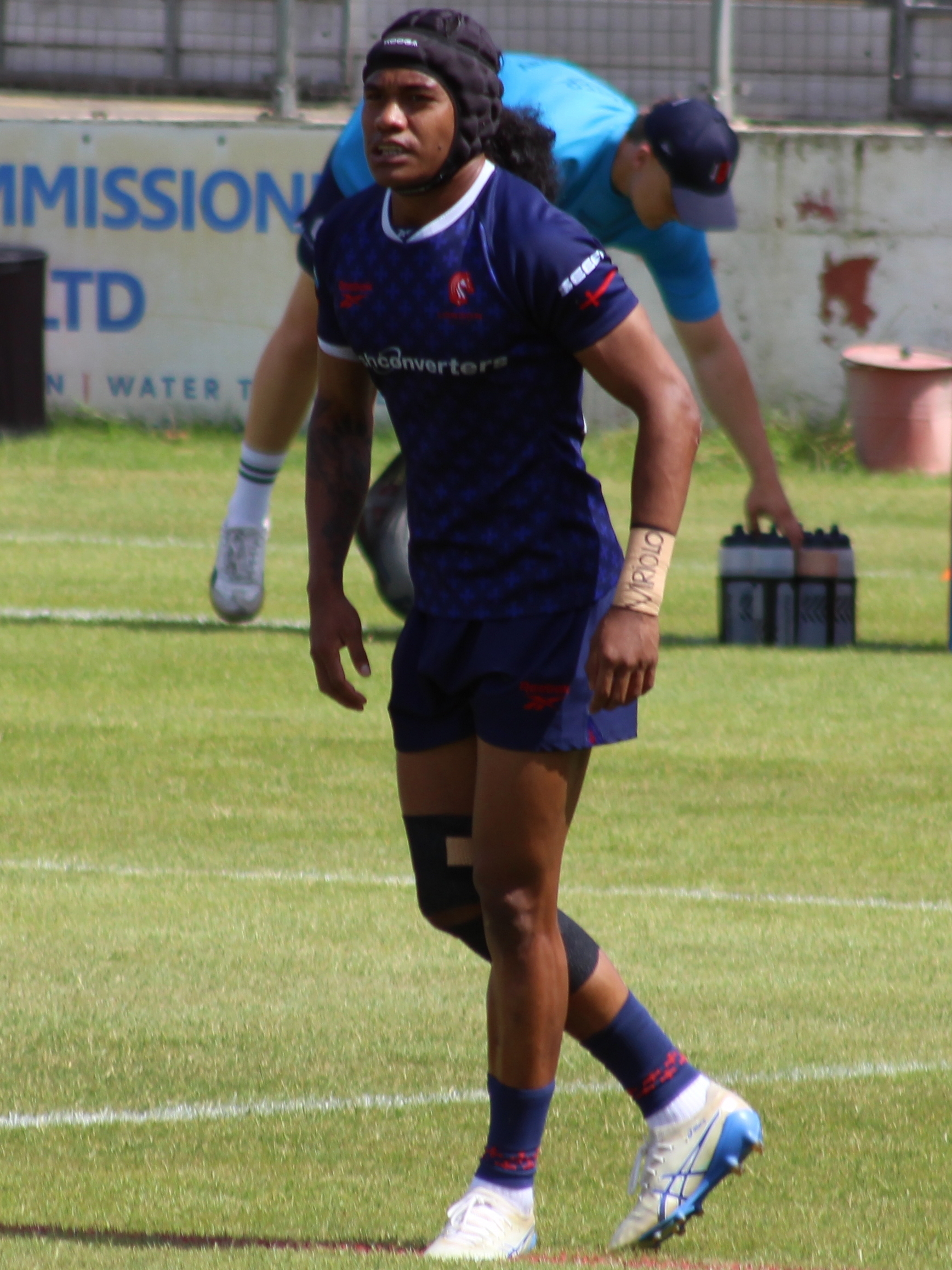

Personal information
- Full name: Gairo Voro
- Born: 7 June 2003 (age 23) Viriolo, Abau District, Central Province, Papua New Guinea
- Height: 6 ft 0 in (1.84 m)
- Weight: 13 st 10 lb (87 kg)

Playing information
- Position: Stand-off
Club
Years	Team	Pld	T	G	FG	P
2024–25	PNG Hunters	20	7	0	0	28
2026	London Broncos	31	39	62	0	280
2027–	PNG Hunters	0	0	0	0	0
	Total	51	46	62	0	308
Representative
Years	Team	Pld	T	G	FG	P
2025–	PNG Prime Minister's XIII	1	0	0	0	0
2025–	Papua New Guinea	5	3	0	0	12
- Source: As of 16 November 2026

Gairo Voro (born 7 June 2003) is a Papua New Guinean professional rugby league footballer who plays as a stand-off for the PNG Hunters in the Queensland Cup and Papua New Guinea at international level.

He previously played for the PNG Hunters in the QLD Cup and London Broncos in the RFL Championship.

Voro will join the Papua New Guinea Chiefs ahead of the 2028 NRL season.

== Early life ==
Voro was born in Viriolo, Abau District in the Central Province, Papua New Guinea in 2003.

He played for the Central Dabaris in the Digicel Cup, the highest level of competition in Papua New Guinea.

== Career ==
=== Club career ===
==== PNG Hunters ====
Voro made his PNG Hunters debut against the Northern Pride in the QLD Cup in 2024.

==== London Broncos ====
On 18 November 2025 it was reported that he had signed for the London Broncos in the RFL Championship.

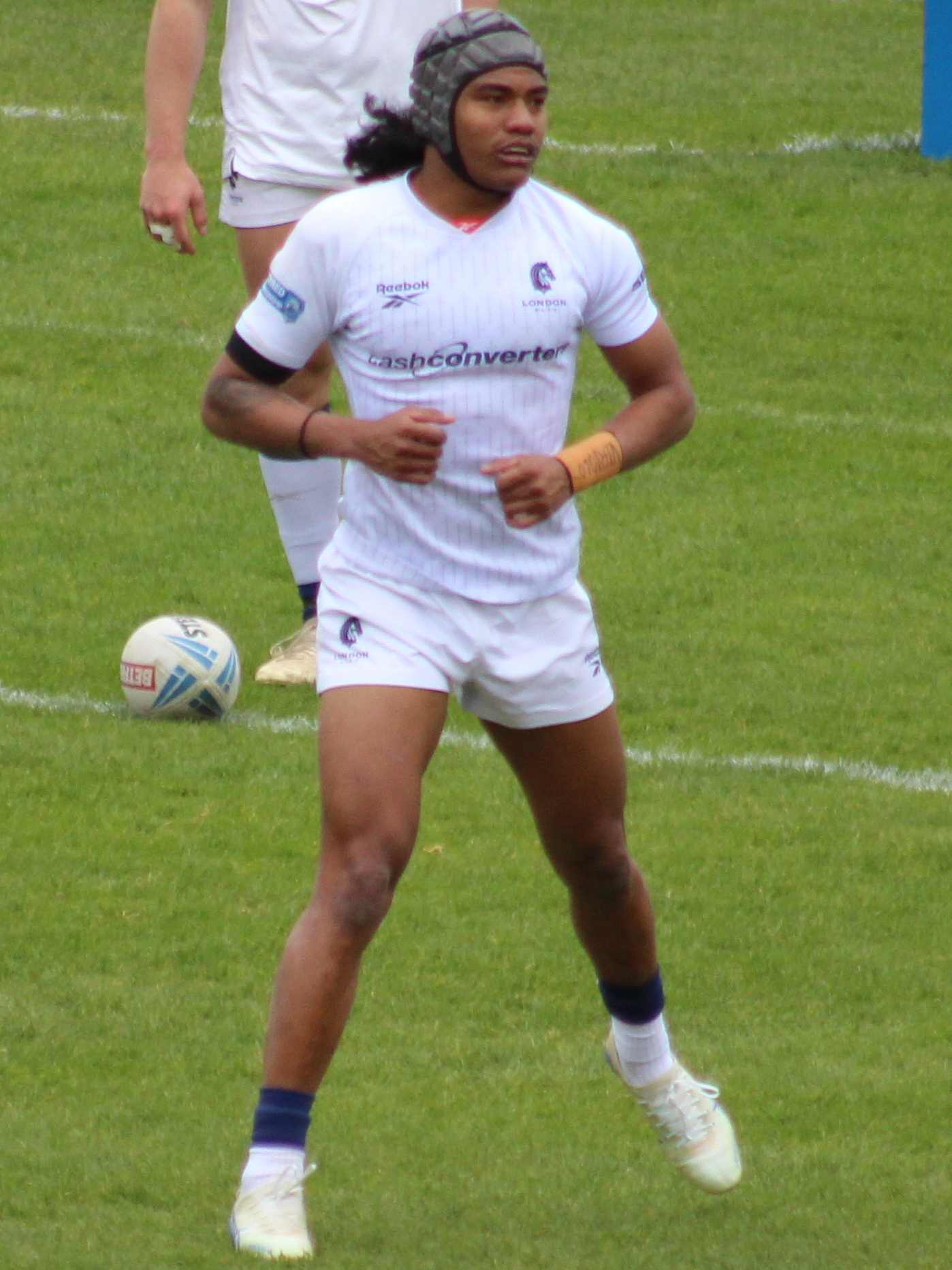
Voro warming up for London in 2026

On 4 July 2026 Voro scored seven tries and a total of 44 points in the 78-16 victory over Hunslet at Stonebridge Road in the RFL Championship. This broke the Broncos record for the most points in a game and the most tries in a game.

In August 2026, he was part of the Broncos squad that lifted the RFL Championship Leaders' Shield.

He played in London's 1895 Cup Final victory over the Widnes Vikings at the Halliwell Jones Stadium in August 2026.

In September 2026 he was named Young Player of the Year at the clubs awards night.

Voro was named Championship Player of the Year in September 2026.

In October 2026, he played in the Broncos Championship Grand Final victory over Doncaster at Plough Lane.

=== PNG Hunters ===
On 16 November 2026 it was reported that he had signed for the PNG Hunters in the Queensland Cup

=== International ===
==== Junior Kumuls ====
Voro played for the Junior Kumuls against the Australian Schoolboys team.

==== PNG Prime Minister's XIII ====
He made his debut for the PNG Prime Minister's XIII against the Australian Prime Minister's XIII in 2025.

==== Papua New Guinea ====
Voro made his international debut for Papua New Guinea in their 22–12 victory over the Cook Islands in October 2025.

== Club statistics ==
Year	Club	League Competition	Appearances	Tries	Goals	Drop goals	Points	Notes
2024	Papua New Guinea Hunters	Queensland Cup	1	0	0	0	0	
2025	Papua New Guinea Hunters	Queensland Cup	19	7	0	0	28	
2026	London Broncos	RFL Championship	32	39	62	0	280	
2027	PNG Hunters	Queensland Cup						
Club career total			51	46	53	0	298	
