= 2025 Papua New Guinea Hunters season =

Rugby league team season

Team information
- CEO: Scott Barker
- Coach: Paul Aiton
- Captain: Ila Alu
- Stadium: PNG Football Stadium
- Avg. attendance: 4,353
| ← 2024 | 2026 → |

The 2025 Hostplus Cup will be the PNG Hunters' twelfth season in rugby league's Queensland Cup. The Papua New Guinea Hunters is a professional rugby league club from Papua New Guinea.

== Season summary ==
=== Milestone games ===
| Round | Player | Milestone |
|---|---|---|
| Round 1 | (#117) | Hostplus Cup debuts |
| Round 1 | | scored his first try |

== 2025 squad ==
PNG Hunters
| First team squad | | | | Coaching staff |
|---|---|---|---|---|
| Sanny Wabo – FB; Derrick Voku – WG; Rob Mathias – CE; Elijah Roltinga – CE; Brandon Nima – WG, CE (vc); Jamie Mavoko – SO; Joshua Mire – HB; Koso Bandi – PR; Finley Glare – HK; Epel Kapinias – PR; Benji Kot – SR, CE; Whallen Tau-Loi – SR; Ila Alu – LK (c) | Trevor Solu – HK; Seal Kalo – PR; Anthony Worot – PR, SR; Alex Max – CE; Jordan Pat – PR; Sakias Komati – SO; Clent Lama – CE; Murray Connors – PR; Gairo Voro – SO, HB; Bradley Orosambo – HB, SO; Himson Ulalom – SR; Manasi Kai – PR; Norman Akunai – PR | Cedric Kuli – SR; Steven Bruno – PR; Finley Muno – WG; Smith Pamundi – LK; Zechariah Selu – HK; Jacob Lot – PR; Jade Puk – WG; Jetro James – PR; Limbi Henry – SR; Emmanuel Balio – PR; Shane Kunjil – SR; Vane Manuma – PR, SR; Lynchill Kiap – HK | Reynolds Tai – PR, SR; Fabian Kairi – HK; Zebedy Kip – SR; Jade Puk – WG | Head coach: Paul Aiton; Assistant coaches: Wartovo Puara; Enoch Maki; Legend: (c) Captain(s); (vc) Vice-captain(s); Updated: 12 November 2024; Source(s): https://www.pnghunters.com/2024/11/12/hunters-kick-off-2025-preseason-training/ |

== Squad movement ==
=== Gains ===
| Player | Signed from | Until end of | Notes |
|---|---|---|---|
| | | 2025 | |

=== Losses ===
| Player | Signed to | Until end of | Notes |
|---|---|---|---|
| Judah Rimbu | Castleford Tigers | 2026 | |
| Morea Morea | Central Queensland Capras | 2025 | |

== Statistics ==
| * | Denotes player on loan from the Central Queensland Capras. |

| Name | App | T | G | FG | Pts |
|---|---|---|---|---|---|
| Ila Alu | - | - | - | - | - |
| Koso Bandi | - | - | - | - | - |
| Norman Akunai | - | - | - | - | - |
| Finley Glare | - | - | - | - | - |
| Steven Bruno | - | - | - | - | - |
| Emmanuel Anis | - | - | - | - | - |
| Seal Kalo | - | - | - | - | - |
| Epel Kapinias | - | - | - | - | - |
| Limbi Henry | - | - | - | - | - |
| Sakias Komati | - | - | - | - | - |
| Jordan Pat | - | - | - | - | - |
| Benji Kot | - | - | - | - | - |
| Joshua Lau | - | - | - | - | - |
| Bradley Orosambo | - | - | - | - | - |
| Joshua Mire | - | - | - | - | - |
| Shane Kunjil | - | - | - | - | - |
| Himson Ulalom | - | - | - | - | - |
| Brandon Nima | - | - | - | - | - |
| Reynolds Tai | - | - | - | - | - |
| Vane Manuma | - | - | - | - | - |
| Zechariah Selu | - | - | - | - | - |
| Trevor Solu | - | - | - | - | - |
| Whallen Tau-Loi | - | - | - | - | - |
| Anthony Worot | - | - | - | - | |
| Zebedy Kip | - | - | - | - | - |
| Totals | | 0 | 0 | 0 | 0 |

== Representatives ==
The following players played representative matches in 2025.

| PNG Prime Minister's XIII | 2025 Rugby League Pacific Championships |
|---|---|
| PNG Prime Minister's XIII | |
| PNG Prime Minister's XIII | PNG Kumuls |
| PNG Prime Minister's XIII | PNG Kumuls |
| PNG Prime Minister's XIII | |
| PNG Prime Minister's XIII | |
| PNG Prime Minister's XIII | PNG Kumuls |
| PNG Prime Minister's XIII | PNG Kumuls |
| PNG Prime Minister's XIII | PNG Kumuls |
