= Siliva Havili =

NZ & Tonga international rugby league footballer

Liva Havili

Personal information
- Full name: Siliva Havili
- Born: 18 February 1993 (age 33) Auckland, New Zealand
- Height: 5 ft 10 in (1.78 m)
- Weight: 16 st 10 lb (106 kg)

Playing information
- Position: Hooker, Loose forward
Club
Years	Team	Pld	T	G	FG	P
2014–15	New Zealand Warriors	14	0	0	0	0
2016–17	St. George Illawarra	10	0	0	0	0
2018–21	Canberra Raiders	80	5	0	0	20
2022–25	South Sydney	69	4	0	0	16
2026–	London Broncos	26	7	0	0	28
	Total	199	16	0	0	64
Representative
Years	Team	Pld	T	G	FG	P
2013–25	Tonga	22	3	0	0	12
2014	New Zealand	1	0	0	0	0
- Source: As of 19 November 2026

Siliva Havili (born 18 February 1993) is a professional rugby league footballer who plays as a loose forward and hooker for the London Broncos in the Super League. He has played for both Tonga and New Zealand at international level.

He previously played for the New Zealand Warriors, the St. George Illawarra Dragons, Canberra Raiders and the South Sydney Rabbitohs in the National Rugby League.

== Background ==
Havili was born in Auckland, New Zealand. He was educated at St Paul's College, Auckland.

== Playing career ==
=== Early career ===
An Otara Scorpions junior, Havili signed with the New Zealand Warriors and has played in their NYC side in the 2011, 2012 and 2013 seasons.

Havili has also played for the Auckland Vulcans in the NSW Cup.

Havili was a Junior Kiwi in 2011 and 2012.

=== 2013 ===
On 20 April 2013, Havili made his international debut for Tonga against Samoa in the Pacific Rugby League International at Penrith Stadium. Havili started at hooker in the Tongan 36–4 victory.

On 8 October 2013, Havili was selected in the Tonga 24 man squad.

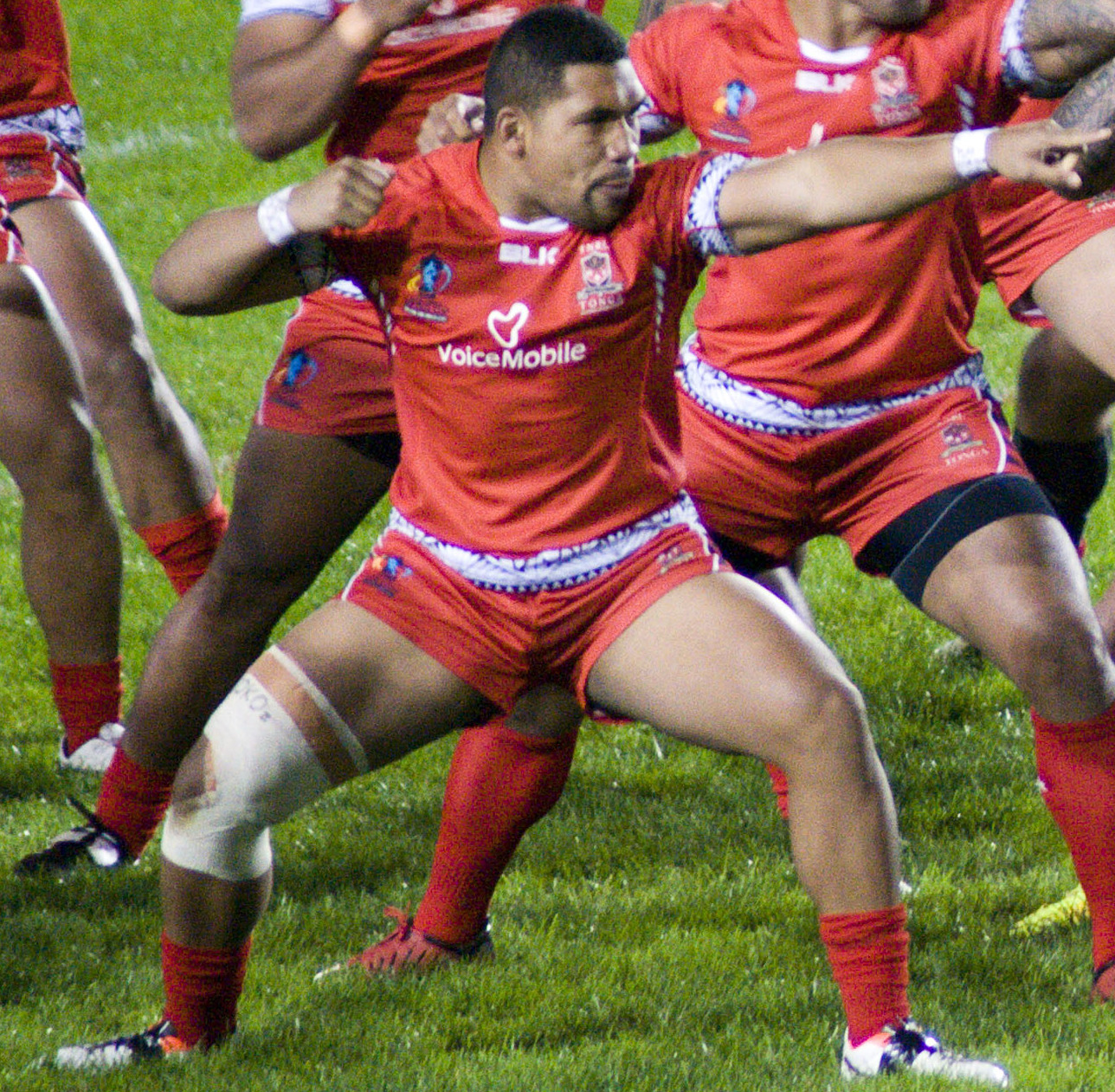
Havili playing for Tonga in 2013

Havili played 1 match for Tonga in the 2013 Rugby League World Cup in Tonga's opening match against Scotland, playing at hooker in Tonga's 26–24 loss at Derwent Park.

=== 2014 ===
Havili made his first grade debut in Round 6 of the 2014 NRL season against the Canterbury-Bankstown Bulldogs playing off the bench in the Warriors 21–20 loss at Eden Park.

On 28 April 2014, after just playing in 3 NRL matches, Havili earnt a surprise call-up to the Kiwis squad to take on Australia in the 2014 Anzac Test at SFS. Havili his New Zealand international debut off the bench in the 30–18 loss.

On 11 May 2014, Havili extended his contract with the Warriors for a further two seasons, keeping him at the club to the end off the 2016 season.

Havili finished off his debut year in the NRL with him playing in 6 matches for the Warriors in the 2014 season.

On 9 September 2014, Havili was selected for the New Zealand 2014 Four Nations train on squad. On 7 October 2014, Havili was selected in the New Zealand national rugby league team final 24 man squad for the series.

=== 2015 ===
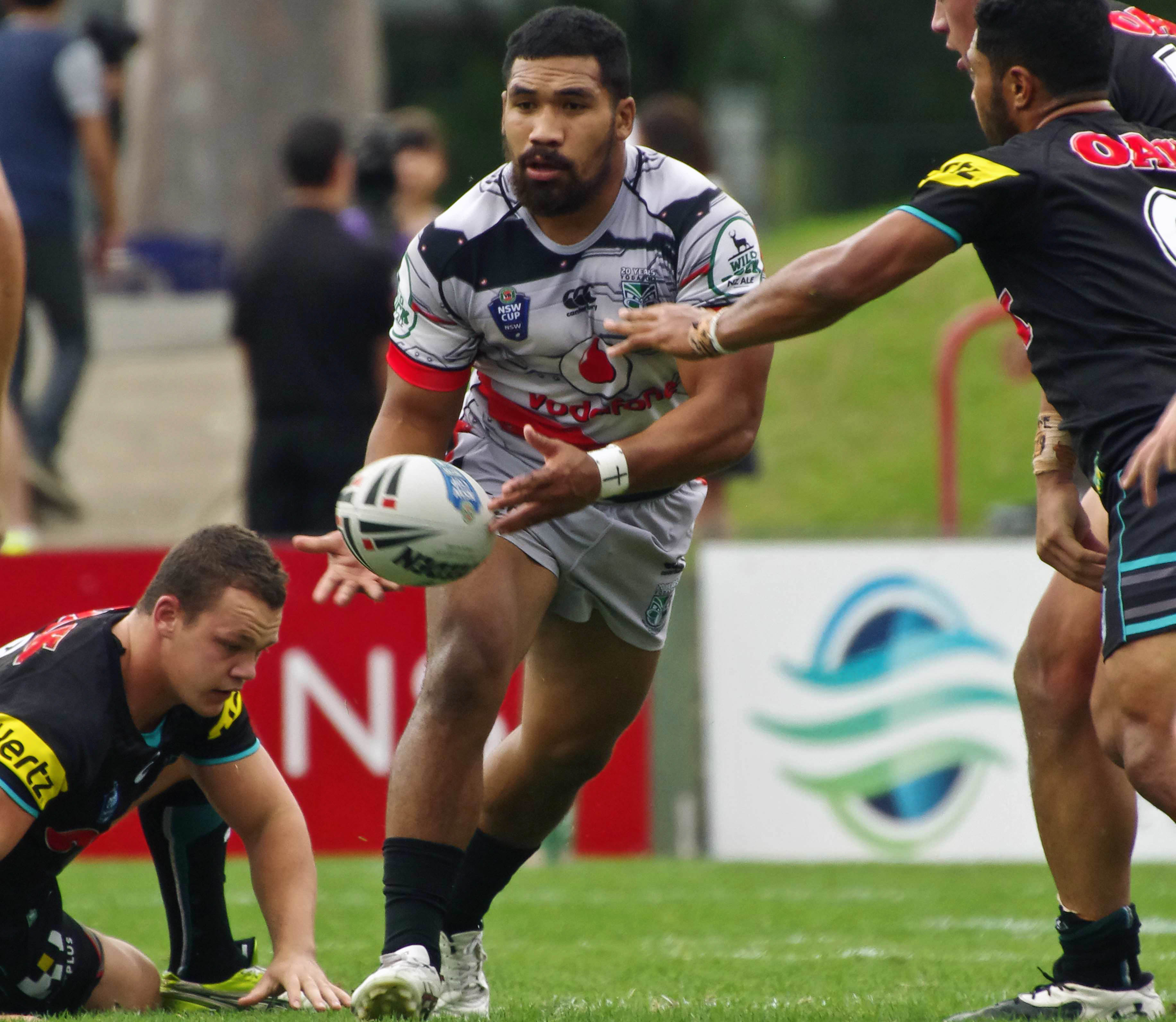
Havili playing for the New Zealand Warriors in 2015

On 20 July 2015, Havili signed a two-year contract with the St. George Illawarra Dragons starting in 2016.

=== 2016 ===
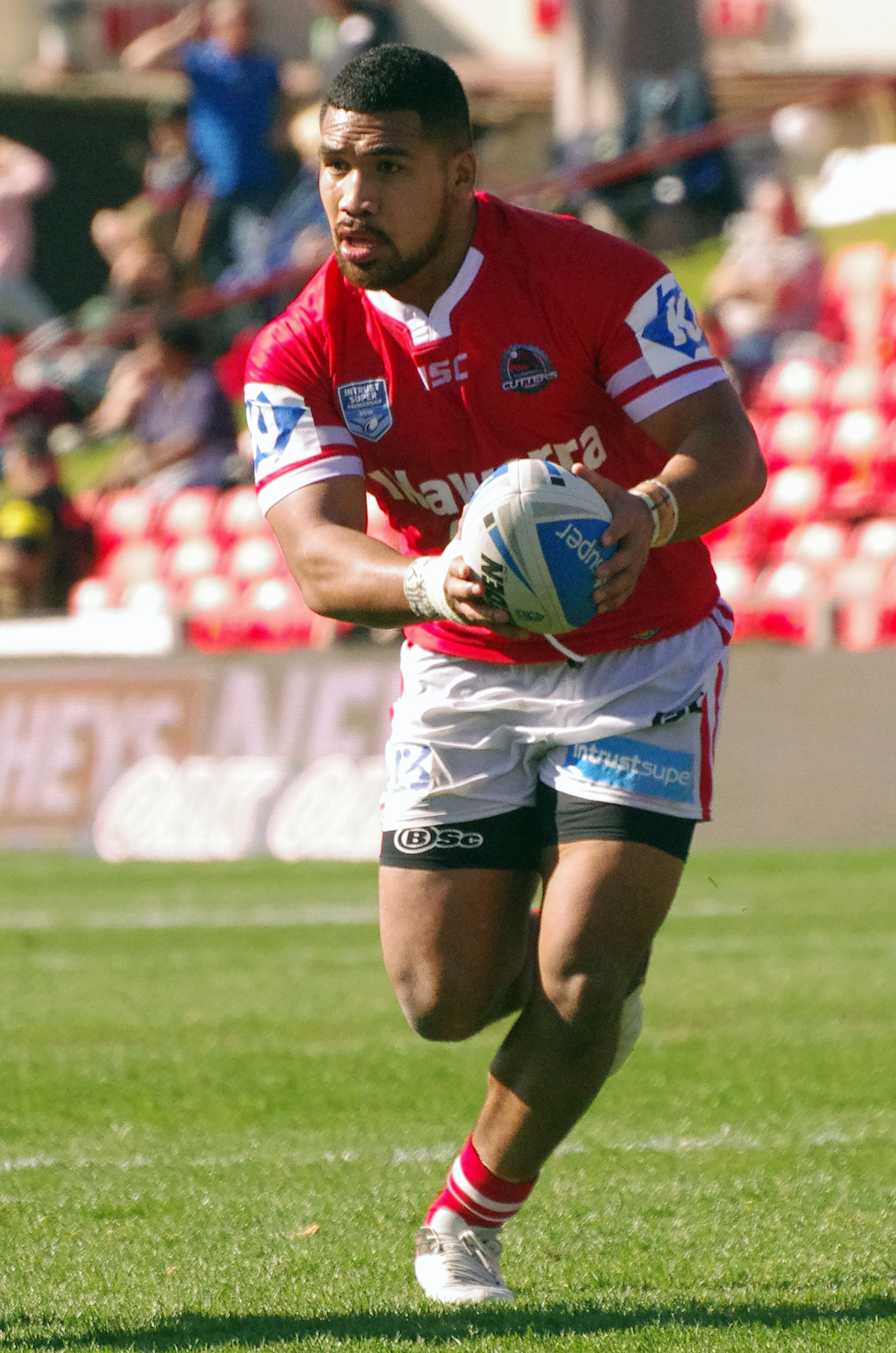
Havili playing, whilst at the St. George Illawarra Dragons in 2016

Havili played ten games for the Dragons, all coming from the bench.

=== 2017 ===
Havili was selected to play for Tonga in the 2017 Rugby League World Cup despite not playing a single game for the Dragons that season. After producing a string of excellent performances in the World Cup, he was signed to a one-year contract by the Canberra Raiders.

=== 2018 ===
With first-choice hooker Josh Hodgson injured for much of season 2018, Havili produced the best season of his career to date, playing 24 games and earning himself a two-year contract extension.

He also retained his place in the Tonga squad for their historic first Test match against the Australian Kangaroos on October 20.

=== 2019 ===
Havili made 22 appearances for Canberra in the 2019 NRL season as the club reached their first grand final in 25 years.

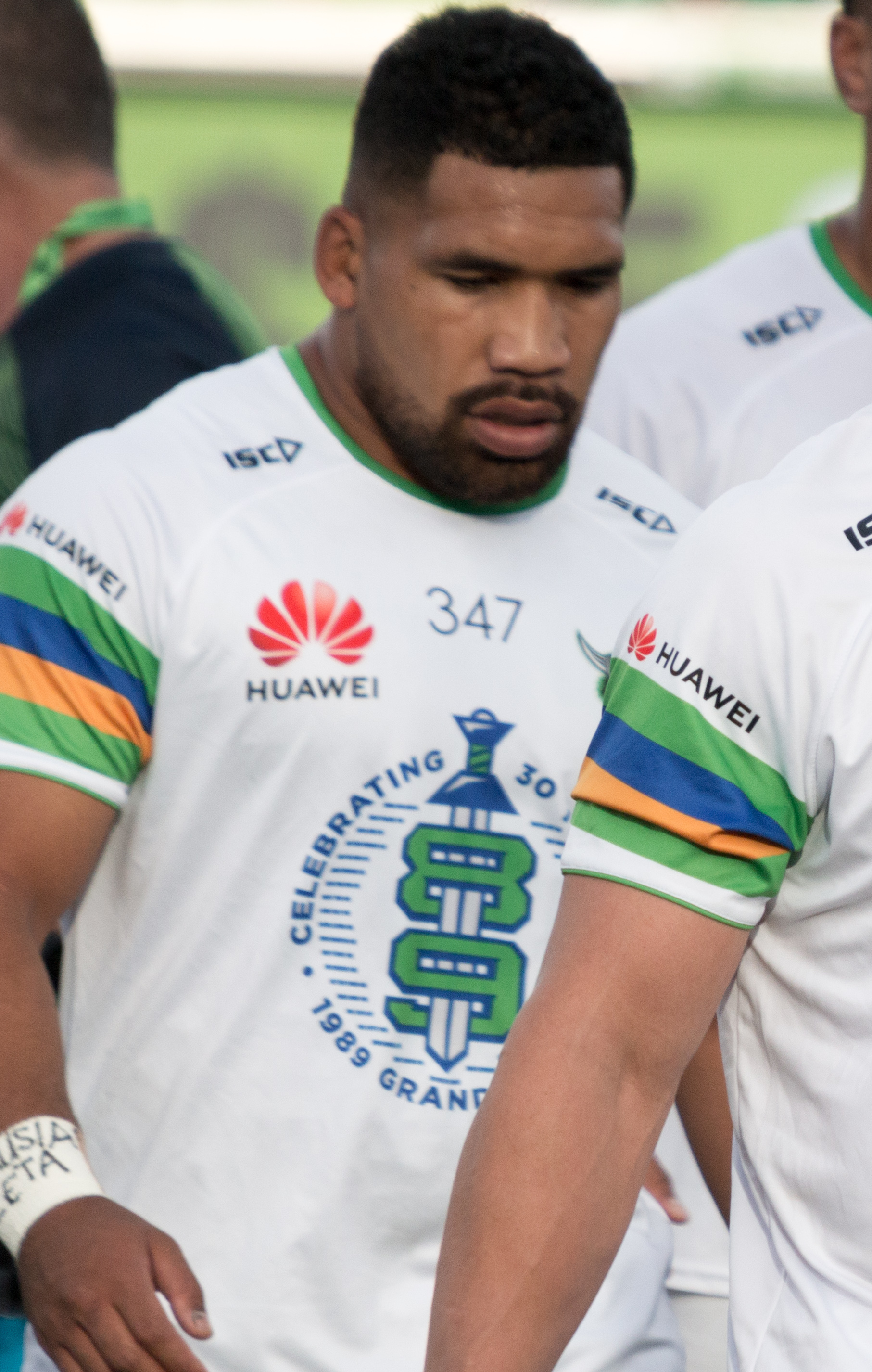
Havili warming up for the Raiders in 2019

Havili did not play in the 2019 NRL Grand Final in which Canberra were defeated 14–8 by the Sydney Roosters at ANZ Stadium.

=== 2020 ===
He played 23 games for Canberra in the 2020 NRL season including the club's preliminary final loss against Melbourne.

=== 2021 ===
He was limited to only eleven appearances for Canberra in the 2021 NRL season which saw the club miss the finals series.

On 21 October, he signed a two-year deal to join South Sydney.

=== 2022 ===
Havili played 23 games for South Sydney in the 2022 NRL season including two of the clubs finals matches against the Sydney Roosters and Cronulla. Havili did not feature in South Sydney's preliminary final loss to eventual premiers Penrith.

In October 2022 he was named in the Tonga squad for the 2021 Rugby League World Cup.

=== 2023 ===
Havili played a total of eight games throughout the 2023 NRL season as South Sydney finished 9th on the table and missed the finals.

=== 2024 ===
Havili played 15 games for South Sydney in the 2024 NRL season which saw the club finish 16th on the table.

=== 2025 ===
Havili played 23 matches for South Sydney in the 2025 NRL season which saw the club finish 14th on the table. In September, it was announced that Havili would be departing the South Sydney club after not being offered a new contract.

On 9 October 2025 it was reported that he had joined the London Broncos. The length of the deal is unclear at present.

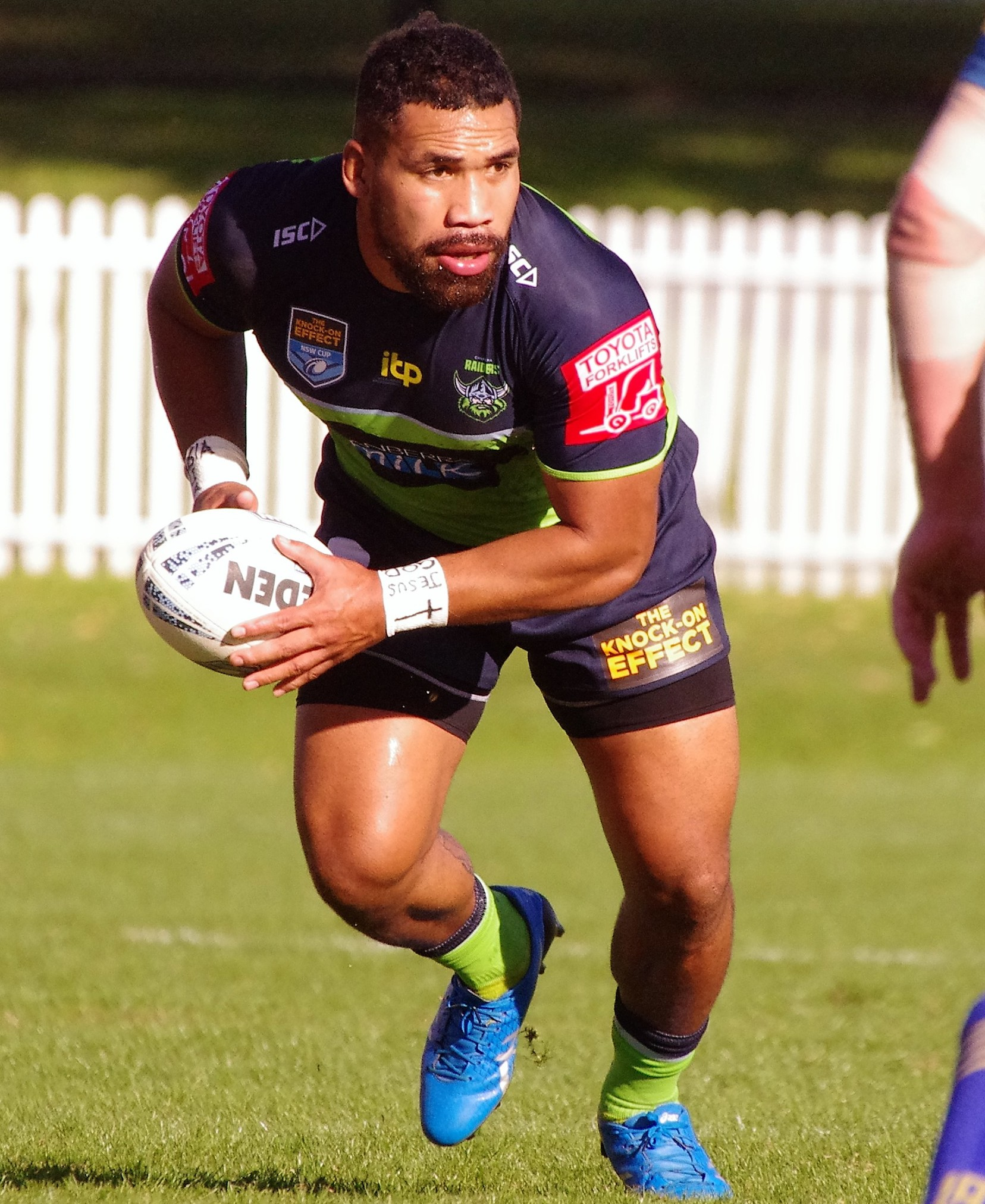
Havili playing for Canberra in 2021

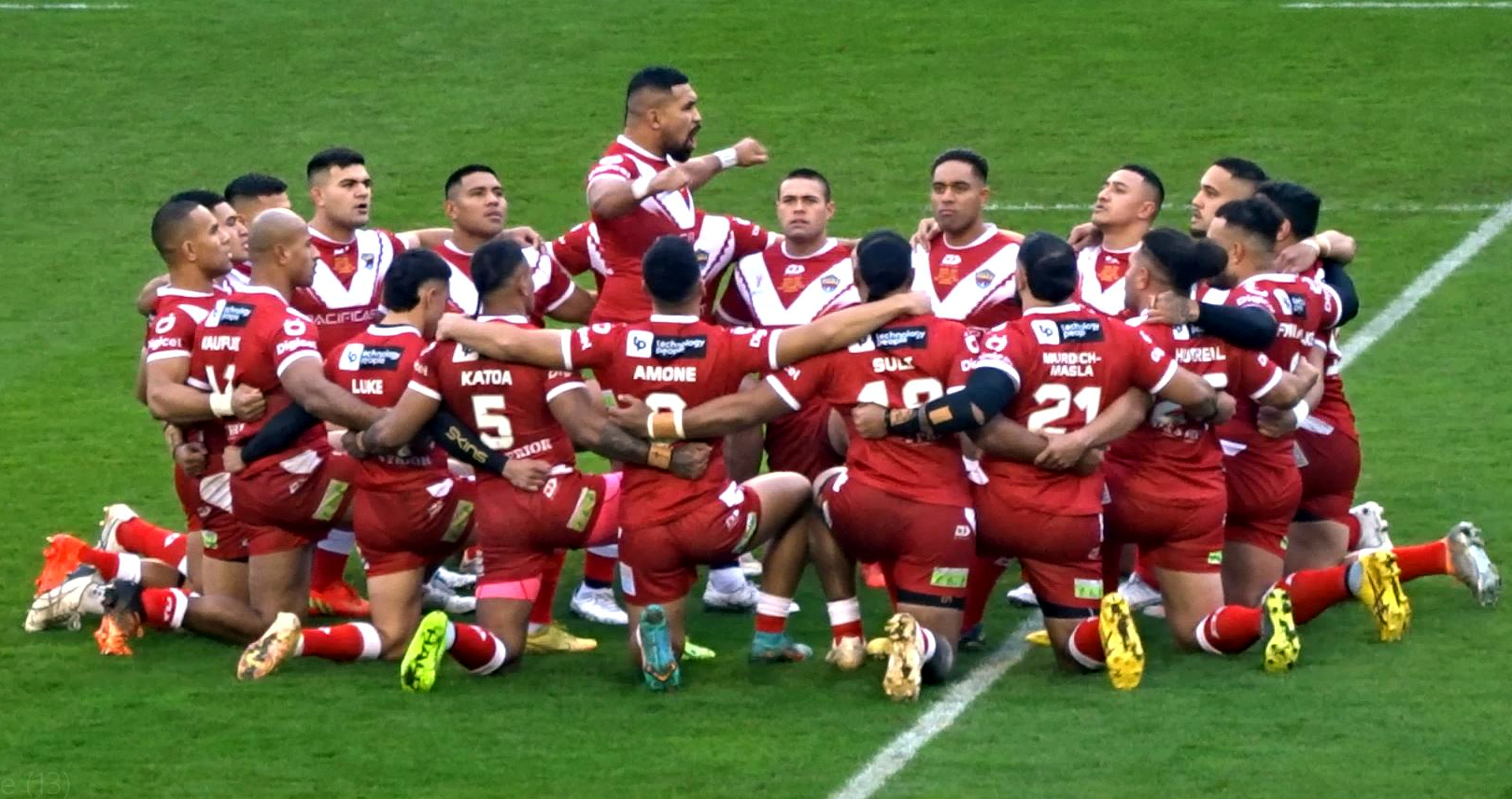
Havili leading the Sipi Tau for Tonga in 2022

=== 2026 ===
Havili was banned for two matches in April 2026 for foul and abusive language to a match official after being sin-binned in the match against Doncaster.

In August 2026, he was part of the Broncos squad that lifted the RFL Championship Leaders' Shield.

He played in London's 1895 Cup Final victory over the Widnes Vikings at the Halliwell Jones Stadium in August 2026.

In October 2026, he played in the Broncos Championship Grand Final victory over Doncaster at Plough Lane.

== Statistics ==
Year	Team	Games	Tries	Goals	Points	Notes
2014	New Zealand Warriors	6	0	0	0	
2015	New Zealand Warriors	8	0	0	0	
2016	St. George Illawarra Dragons	10	0	0	0	
2017	St. George Illawarra Dragons	0	0	0	0	
2018	Canberra Raiders	24	3	0	12	
2019	Canberra Raiders	22	2	0	8	
2020	Canberra Raiders	23	0	0	0	
2021	Canberra Raiders	11	0	0	0	
2022	South Sydney Rabbitohs	23	1	0	4	
2023	South Sydney Rabbitohs	8	0	0	0	
2024	South Sydney Rabbitohs	15	1	0	4	
2025	South Sydney Rabbitohs	23	2	0	8	
2026	London Broncos	26	7	0	28	
2027	London Broncos					
	Totals	199	16	0	64	
