= Papua New Guinea Chiefs =

Future professional rugby league team

PNG Chiefs

Club information
- Full name: Papua New Guinea Chiefs
- Nickname: The PNG Chiefs
- Short name: PNG Chiefs
- Colours: Primary; Gold; Red; Charcoal
- Founded: 2024
- Website: https://nrlpng.co/

Current details
- Ground: National Football Stadium (14,800)
- CEO: Lorna McPherson
- Coach: Willie Peters
- Competition: National Rugby League (2028)

The Papua New Guinea Chiefs are a planned professional rugby league football team based in Port Moresby, Papua New Guinea. They are scheduled to compete in Australia's National Rugby League from the 2028 season.

The inclusion of a Papua New Guinea-based team in the NRL was announced on 12 December 2024, as part of the Pacific Rugby League Partnership involving the Australian Rugby League Commission and Australian Government, in which AU$600 million in government funding will support the new team as well as grassroots development and other community initiatives in Papua New Guinea and the Pacific islands. The PNG Chiefs will be the 19th team in the NRL, with the ARLC finalising a $645m deal with the Western Australian Government on 8 May 2025, thereby securing the Perth Bears as the 18th team from 2027.

== Background ==
=== Papua New Guinean rugby league in Australia ===
Rugby league is the most popular sport in Papua New Guinea and even regarded its national sport, and efforts to launch an NRL team in the country date back to 2008, when prime minister Sir Michael Somare announced a Papua New Guinean bid. In 2014, the Papua New Guinea Hunters entered the state level Queensland Cup competition, going on to win the premiership in 2017.

In February 2021, PNG Prime Minister James Marape declared his hopes of an NRL side in the country by 2025. Through 2023 and 2024, a Papua New Guinea bid was viewed as a frontrunner to enter the NRL, in light of an Australian Government plan to invest $600 million over a 10-year period in rugby league and socio-economic programs in the country. Discussions have included a proposal from ARLC chairman Peter V'landys to offer tax-free status to rugby league players who played for a Papua New Guinea NRL team.

On 12 December, 2024, a Papua New Guinea team in the NRL was formally announced, with the team planned to begin playing in the league in 2028. The name and colours of the team are yet to be determined.

On 24 June 2025, the ARLC boss V'landys met with Marape to unveil the new franchise's seven-person board chaired by former Bulldogs supremo Ray Dib. Dib was unveiled as PNG's first chair and chaired a seven-person board that includes Melbourne Storm legend Marcus Bai. The other board members are Lorna McPherson, Richard Pegum, Stan Joyce, Wapu Sonk and Ian Tarutia.

On 12 October 2025, before the Prime Minister's XIII test between Papua New Guinea and Australia, Marape announced the franchises name as the 'PNG Chiefs', set be the 19th active franchise to join the National Rugby League from the 2028 season

On 21 January 2026, Catherine Harris AO PSM succeeded Ray Dib as Chair of the PNG Chiefs, with Dib departing the board.

=== Security agreement ===
The PNG Chiefs will be funded by a A$600 million package from the Australian government over a ten-year period, as part of the NRL's Pacific Rugby League Partnership which supports and provides investment into grassroots, pathways, and elite rugby league across Papua New Guinea, Tonga, Samoa and Fiji.

In a separate deal, signed in exchange, the Papua New Guinean Government reaffirmed a security pact with Australia aimed at growing relations between Papua New Guinea and Australia and limiting China's influence in the region (in addition to other Pacific countries), in consideration of China's 2022 policing deal with the Solomon Islands. As part of the deal, Papua New Guinea are unable to sign into security agreements with any nation outside the "Pacific Family".

If Australia deem Papua New Guinea to be in breach of this security pact, they reserve the right to withdraw funding for the team: in that case, the NRL would be required to remove the PNG Chiefs from the competition.

== Logo and colours ==
The PNG team ran a national competition to choose a team name, logo and colours that reflect the entire nation. Officials did consider using the Hunters moniker, currently used by the PNG Queensland Cup side. The Crocs were considered as another option that became quite popular amongst Australians and Papua New Guineans. On 12 October 2025, Papua New Guinea Prime Minister James Marape announced that the new PNG team to enter the NRL in 2028 will be known as the PNG Chiefs - a name with cultural significance for men and women. Three names were shortlisted, with the PNG Chiefs had particular appeal for the PNG team as the term can be equally applied to a male or female leader in Papua New Guinea.

On 21 October 2026, The PNG Chiefs launched their inaugural logo and jersey. The centrepiece of the new logo is a PNG chief formed from elements drawn across Papua New Guinea. The logo has four key elements:

- The feather headpiece: Inspired by Papua New Guinea’s ceremonial plumes, the five feathers represent strength, beauty, chiefly status and national pride, with the Southern Cross connecting the club to the nation’s flag. The five feathers further represent Papua, Highlands, Momase, New Guinea Islands and the Autonomous Region of Bougainville.
- The cassowary bone: Inspired by warrior traditions, the cassowary bone symbolises chiefly status, courage, power and the fighting spirit of the team.
- The face: The chief’s face represents the shape of Papua New Guinea, with ceremonial red paint showing a nation united through one warrior, one team and one purpose.
- The kina shells: The headband features shells representing kina and toea, Papua New Guinea’s currency. Representing traditional wealth, trade and prestige across Papua New Guinea’s coastal, island and highland communities, the kina symbolises the value, legacy and future the club is building for the nation.

The home kit is predominantly white with a classic V, made up of cultural drawings, while the club’s primary colours are red, gold and charcoal. The away strip is a mainly black jersey with gold trim and the same cultural designs inside the classic V.

However, the club is engaged in an ongoing trademark dispute with New Zealand Rugby over similarities with the Chiefs, casting some doubt over future use of the name.

== Stadium ==
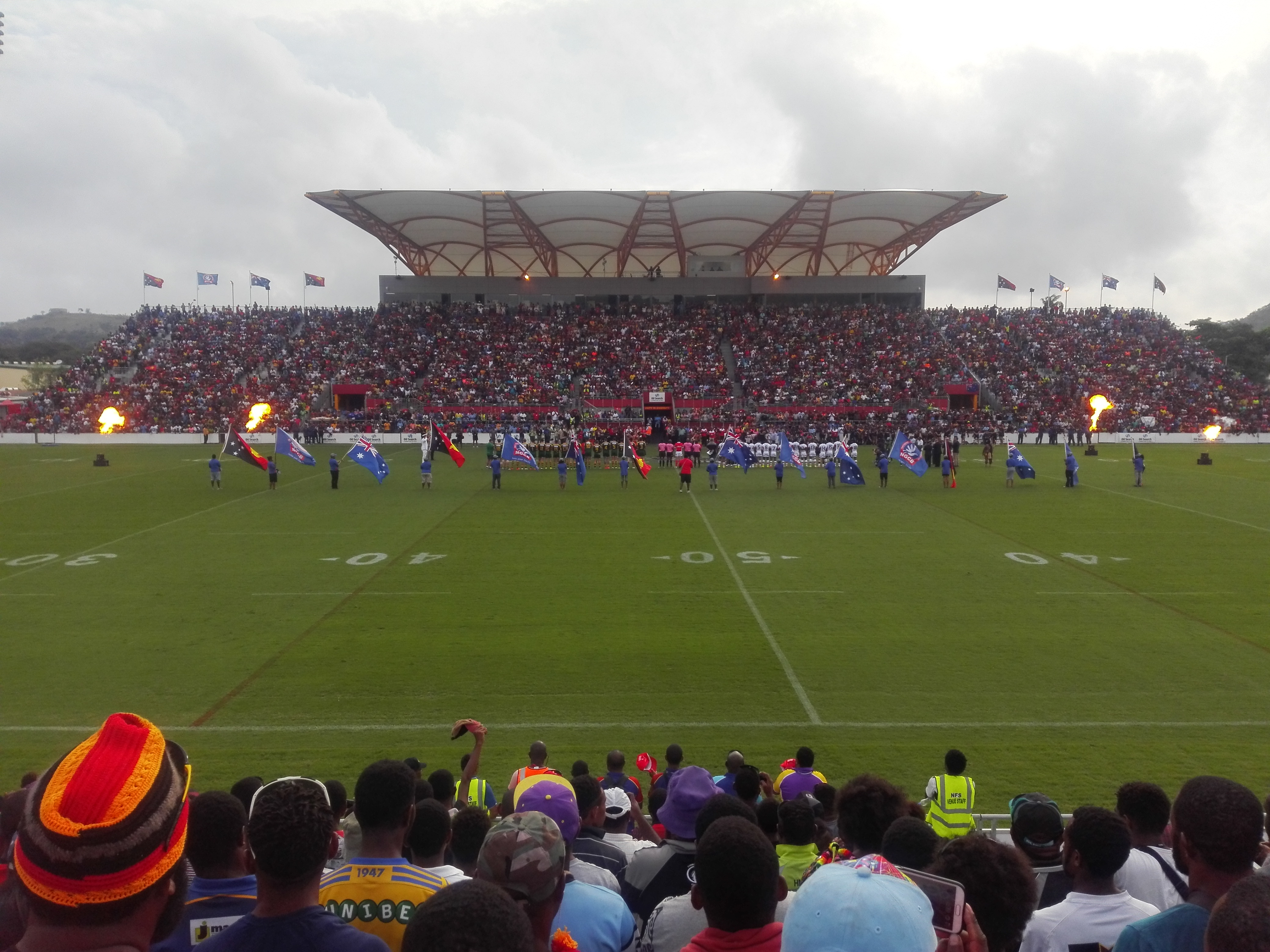
National Football Stadium will be the home of the PNG team

National Football Stadium, known by the sponsored name of Santos National Football Stadium, is a sporting ground in Port Moresby. It will be the home ground for the Chiefs and the Papua New Guinea national rugby league team. It has a total capacity of approximately 15,000 and is the National Stadium of Papua New Guinea. The stadium was completely redeveloped in preparation for the 2015 Pacific Games. It will be upgraded to a capacity of 23,000 - 25,000 for the Chiefs games in 2028

== Players ==
Player	Previous club	Length	Date
(Papua New Guinea) Alex Johnston	South Sydney Rabbitohs	1 year	28 April 2026
(Samoa) Jarome Luai	Parramatta Eels	3 years	28 April 2026
(Australia) Connor Watson	Sydney Roosters	2 years	28 May 2026
(England) Matty Lees	St Helens	2 years	2 June 2026
(Papua New Guinea) Gairo Voro	London Broncos	2 years	1 July 2026
(Papua New Guinea) Morea Morea	London Broncos	2 years	1 July 2026
(Papua New Guinea) Finley Glare	London Broncos	2 years	1 July 2026
(Australia) Zac Lomax	Western Force	3 years	26 July 2026
(Samoa) Brian To’o	Penrith Panthers	3 years	10 August 2026
(New Zealand) Joey Manu	Racing 92	2 years	24 August 2026
(Papua New Guinea) Zac Laybutt	North Queensland Cowboys	2 years	10 November 2026
(Papua New Guinea) Nixon Putt	Central Queensland Capras	2 years	13 November 2026

== Feeder club ==
The PNG Hunters will remain in the second-tier Queensland Cup and act as a feeder club to the Chiefs.

List of Feeders club for the PNG Chiefs from the 2028 NRL Season.
Club name	Club competition
Papua New Guinea Hunters	Queensland Cup

== See also ==
- Expansion of the National Rugby League
- Papua New Guinea National Rugby League
- Papua New Guinea Rugby Football League
- Politics and sports
