= 2024 Papua New Guinea Hunters season =

- Queensland Cup Rank: 5
- Play-off result: 4
- 2024 record: Wins: 12; draws: 0; losses: 8

Team information
- CEO: Scott Barker
- Coach: Paul Aiton
- Captain: Ila Alu
- Stadium: PNG Football Stadium
← 2023	2025 →

The 2024 Hostplus Cup is the PNG Hunters' eleventh season in rugby league's Queensland Cup. The Papua New Guinea Hunters is a professional rugby league club from Papua New Guinea.

== Season summary ==
=== Milestone games ===
Round	Player	Milestone

== Ladder ==
Pos	Team	Pld	W	D	L	B	PF	PA	PD	Pts	Qualification
3	Redcliffe Dolphins	20	13	0	7	3	616	414	+202	32	Finals series
4	Sunshine Coast Falcons	20	12	0	8	3	546	387	+159	30	Finals series
5	Papua New Guinea Hunters	20	12	0	8	3	602	595	+7	30	Finals series
6	Central Queensland Capras	20	10	2	8	3	474	452	+22	28	Finals series
7	Burleigh Bears	20	10	1	9	3	542	404	+138	27	Finals series

Source: QRL RLP

== 2024 squad ==
PNG Hunters
First team squad			Coaching staff
Sanny Wabo – FB; Brandon Nima – WG, CE; Robert Mathias – CE, SR; Alex Max – CE, SR; Solo Wane – WG; Joshua Lau – SO, CE, FB; Jamie Mavoko – HB; Valentine Richard – PR; Judah Rimbu – HK, HB; Junior Rop – PR, LK; Whallen Tau-Loi – SR; Benji Kot – SR, CE; Ila Alu – LK (c)	Finley Glare – HK, HB; Jordan Pat – PR; Koso Bandi – SR; Junior Talin – SR; Elijah Roltinga – CE; Anthony Worot – PR; Clent Lama – CE; Joshua Mire – SO, HB; Manisa Kai – SR; Seal Kalo – PR; Weiyah Koi – SR, LK; Morea Morea – FB; Sakias Komati – SO	Wendle Kipsy – PR, SR; Gairo Voro – HK; Trevor Solu – HK; Zechariah Selu – SO, HB	Head coach: Paul Aiton; Assistant coaches: Wartovo Puara; Enoch Maki; Legend: (c) Captain(s); (vc) Vice-captain(s); Updated: 04 March 2024; Source(s):

== Squad movement ==
=== Gains ===
Player	Signed from	Until end of	Notes
Koso Bandi	Rabaul Gurias	2024	

=== Losses ===
Player	Signed to	Until end of	Notes
Rodrick Tai	Warrington Wolves	2024	

== Statistics ==
Name	App	T	G	FG	Pts
Ila Alu	21	1	-	-	4
Koso Bandi	18	0	-	-	0
Finley Glare	4	0	-	-	0
Manisa Kai	7	0	-	-	0
Seal Kalo	10	0	-	-	0
Sakias Komati	6	2	-	-	8
Weiyah Koi	7	0	-	-	0
Benji Kot	20	5	-	-	20
Clent Lama	15	6	6	-	36
Joshua Lau	20	8	-	1	33
Jamie Mavoko	17	2	68	-	144
Alex Max	17	13	-	-	52
Joshua Mire	6	1	-	-	4
Morea Morea	2	0	0	-	0
Brandon Nima	23	14	-	-	56
Jordan Pat	20	2	-	-	8
Valentine Richard	17	6	-	-	24
Elijah Roltinga	15	9	-	-	36
Judah Rimbu	23	16	-	-	64
Junior Rop	13	2	-	-	8
Trevor Solu	1	-	1	-	2
Whallen Tau-Loi	5	2	-	-	8
Gairo Voro|1	-	-	-	-	
Sanny Wabo|22	13	-	-	52	
Solo Wane	23	7	-	-	28
Anthony Worot	16	-	-	-	-
Totals		124	91	1	679

== Representatives ==
The following players played representative matches in 2024.

	PNG Prime Minister's XIII	2024 Rugby League Pacific Championships
Ila Alu	PNG Prime Minister's XIII	PNG Kumuls
Valentine Richard		PNG Kumuls
Benji Kot	PNG Prime Minister's XIII	
Alex Max	PNG Prime Minister's XIII	
Jamie Mavoko	PNG Prime Minister's XIII	
Finley Glare	PNG Prime Minister's XIII	
Jordan Pat	PNG Prime Minister's XIII	
Sakias Komati	PNG Prime Minister's XIII	
Brandon Nima	PNG Prime Minister's XIII	
Morea Morea	PNG Prime Minister's XIII	PNG Kumuls
Koso Bandi	PNG Prime Minister's XIII	PNG Kumuls
Judah Rimbu	PNG Prime Minister's XIII	PNG Kumuls
Elijah Roltinga	PNG Prime Minister's XIII	PNG Kumuls
Sanny Wabo	PNG Prime Minister's XIII	
Rob Mathias	PNG Prime Minister's XIII	PNG Kumuls
