= Willie Peters =

Australian rugby league footballer & coach

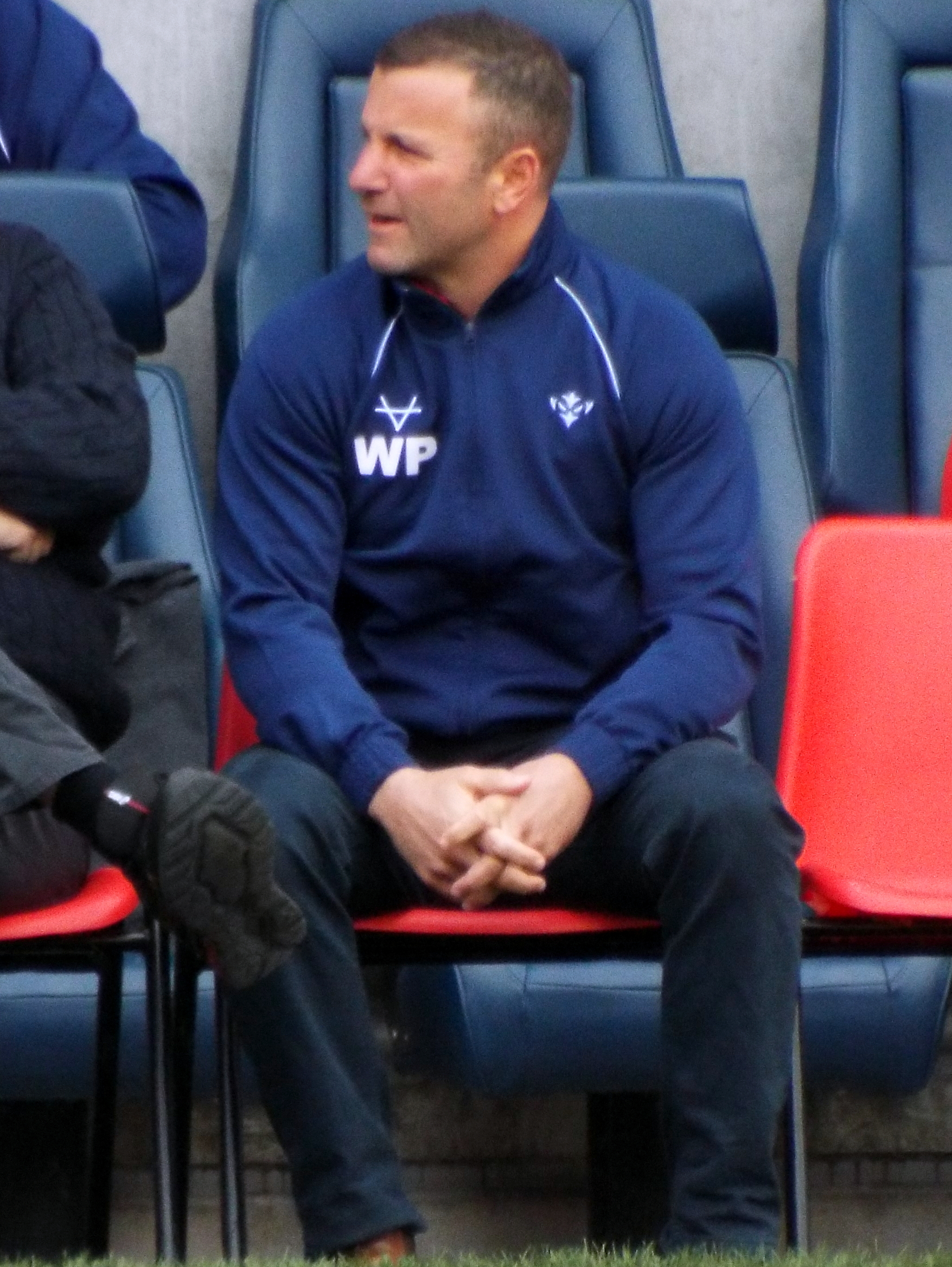

Personal information
- Born: 1 March 1979 (age 47) Sydney, New South Wales, Australia
- Height: 5 ft 5 in (1.66 m)
- Weight: 11 st 11 lb (75 kg)

Playing information
- Position: Halfback
Club
Years	Team	Pld	T	G	FG	P
1997–98	South Sydney	18	2	0	0	8
1999	Gateshead Thunder	27	11	1	6	52
2000	Wigan Warriors	31	16	5	6	80
2001–02	St. George Illawarra	38	13	0	5	57
2003–04	South Sydney	20	2	3	1	15
2004	Widnes Vikings	9	3	0	2	14
	Total	143	47	9	20	226

Coaching information
Club
Years	Team	Gms	W	D	L	W%
2023–26	Hull Kingston Rovers	134	94	0	40	70
2025	Australia (Assistant)	3	3	0	0	100
2028	PNG Chiefs
	Total	137	97	0	40	71
- Source: As of 15 November 2026

Willie Peters (born 1 March 1979) is an Australian professional rugby league coach who is the head coach of Hull Kingston Rovers in the Super League and a former professional rugby league footballer.

Peters played in the 1990s and 2000s for the South Sydney Rabbitohs as a halfback. He had also previously played for the St George Illawarra Dragons as well as in England for Gateshead, Widnes and Wigan.

== Background ==
Willie Peters was born in Sydney, Australia and is of Greek heritage.

== Playing career ==
While playing for Souths in the 1990s, coach Craig Coleman declared that Peters could be the next Peter Sterling. In 1999, Peters joined Gateshead before joining Wigan in 2000. Peters played for the Wigan Warriors at scrum half back in their 2000 Super League Grand Final loss against St Helens

In 2001, Peters joined St. George playing with the club for two seasons before returning to Souths in 2003. Peters played his two final seasons in Australia with South Sydney where the club finished with back to back wooden spoons. In 2004, Peters joined Widnes and played one season with the club before retiring.

== Post playing ==
In 2016, Peters became head coach of the Wests Tigers Holden Cup team. In 2017, Peters became the assistant coach at Manly Warringah Sea Eagles. On 15 September 2017, Peters left his position at Manly after it was alleged he had been involved in a fight with another Manly staff member at a pub in The Rocks, Sydney. Peters was issued with an infringement notice by police for offensive behaviour. The Manly club later released a statement which read "The Sea Eagles will not tolerate misconduct and expect all employees to represent the club at the highest standard," Manly owner and chairman Scott Penn said. "All employees agree to the club's code of conduct and know what is expected of them. We must uphold these standards and will not accept any avoidable breach of conduct".

After leaving Manly, Peters became an NRL assistant coach under Wayne Bennett at the South Sydney Rabbitohs in 2019, before joining with the Newcastle Knights in 2020 as assistant coach.

In May 2022, Peters was named as the new coach of Hull KR, succeeding Tony Smith. Peters took charge at the end of the 2022 season. On 12 August 2023, Peters guided Rovers to the 2023 Challenge Cup Final against Leigh, however, the club would lose 17-16 after golden point extra-time. Peters later guided Hull KR to fourth place, and qualification for the playoffs, where they reached the semi-final, but were defeated 42-12 against Wigan.

In 2024, Peters guided Hull Kingston Rovers to the Grand Final, after narrowly defeating Warrington 10–8 in the semi finals. On 8 October 2024, Peters was named as the Super League coach of the year. On 12 October 2024, Peters coached Hull Kingston Rovers in their 2024 Super League Grand Final loss against Wigan.

On 7 June 2025, Peters coached Hull Kingston Rovers to their 8-6 2025 Challenge Cup final victory over Warrington. It was the clubs first major trophy in 40 years.

In October 2025, Peter became assistant head coach of Australia in addition to his role with KR. In the same month, Peters won the 2025 Super League coach of the year award.

On 11 October 2025, Peters coached Hull Kingston Rovers in their 2025 Super League Grand Final victory over Wigan.

In December 2025, Peters was awarded an Honorary Doctor of Letters (DLitt) by the University of Hull in recognition of his leadership and contribution to rugby league, coinciding with the premiere of Hull KR’s documentary series Renaissance, which documented the club’s treble-winning season.

On 19 February 2026, Peters guided Hull Kingston Rovers to their World Club Challenge victory against Brisbane.

In March 2026, Peters announced the 2026 season would be his last with Hull KR, in addition to stepping down as Australia assistant coach, with Peters taking the head coach role at the new NRL franchise PNG Chiefs for 2027.
