= 2026 RFL Championship =

Rugby league competition in the United Kingdom

2026 Betfred Championship
- Duration: January – October 2026
- Teams: 20
- Matches played: 264
- Points scored: 1,775
- Highest attendance: 4,380 London Broncos v Widnes Vikings (18 January)
- Lowest attendance: 208 Midlands Hurricanes v Goole Vikings (23 June)
- Average attendance: 1,231
- Total attendance: 28,020

2026 season
- Grand Final winners: London Broncos
- League Leaders' Shield: London Broncos
- Biggest home win: Doncaster 120–0 North Wales Crusaders (9 August)
- Biggest away win: North Wales Crusaders 0–134 London Broncos (7 June)
- Top point-scorer: Jimmy Meadows (182)
- Top try-scorer: Morea Morea (25)

The 2026 RFL Championship (officially known as the Betfred Championship for sponsorship reasons) is a professional rugby league club competition. The second tier of the British rugby league system comprises 20 clubs - this is due to the Rugby Football League (RFL) announcing that the Championship and League One competitions were to be combined for the 2026 season.

The Grand Final and League Leaders Shield were both won by London Broncos.

== Team changes ==
Due to the merging of the third tier League One with the Championship into one competition, the Championship increased from 13 clubs to 21 for the 2026 season.

The clubs joining the Championship from League One are:

- Dewsbury Rams
- Goole Vikings
- Keighley Cougars
- Midlands Hurricanes
- Newcastle Thunder
- North Wales Crusaders
- Rochdale Hornets
- Swinton Lions
- Whitehaven
- Workington Town

If the two divisions had not been merged, North Wales would have been promoted to the Championship anyway as winners of the 2025 RFL League One season.

On 16 October 2025 the Bradford Bulls were to be promoted to the Super League and were replaced by the Salford Red Devils. Salford were relegated from Super League via the IMG grading system, as was Bradford's elevation. The following day the two teams joining the Super League as a result of its expansion to 14 teams were announced. Toulouse Olympique and the York Knights were promoted via an independent panel.

On 3 December 2025, Salford was liquidated as a result of unpaid debts to HM Revenue and Customs (HMRC), and as a result had their membership with the RFL terminated, and would no longer compete in the Championship. The RFL hoped that a phoenix club could be created to contest the fixtures, with Salford having until 11 December to submit a viable proposal with a decision scheduled for 17 December. On 17 December, the timeline was extended. On 22 December, a phoenix club was approved to complete in the 2026 Championship.

Featherstone Rovers went into administration in December 2025 and as no satisfactory bid to take over the club emerged by the week before the start of the season, the RFL removed the club from the 2026 season. Further complications arose when Halifax Panthers were wound-up following non-payment of monies due to HMRC on 9 February 2026. The Panthers' membership of the RFL, and therefore the club's permission to participate in the Championship, was withdrawn on 11 February. On 3 March, the RFL granted membership to a new Halifax Panthers club who re-joined the Championship with a 12-point deduction.

North Wales Crusaders were the next team to hit difficulties as the owners withdrew further funding on 9 April. The club's game against Keighley Cougars took place but only because two Crusaders' fans paid the players' wages. The subsequent 1895 Cup game against Midlands Hurricanes was forfeited by the Crusaders and the next scheduled league game against Doncaster was postponed on 27 April after many players left the club. On 6 May, the RFL terminated the Crusaders' membership due to an insolvency event. The following day, the RFL announced that it had approved membership of a new ownership group for the remainder of the 2026 season. The club also received a 12-point deduction.

== Fixtures format ==
The growth from 13 to an originally-planned 21 teams required the development of a new fixture scheduling format, with 40 fixtures deemed far too many for the calendar. A new format, described as a 'pendulum system', was devised, to retain 24 fixtures as in the previous Championship season. To allocate 20 of the fixtures per club, teams play two matches, home and away, against the 10 clubs that finished closest to them in the previous season.

For example, London Broncos, having finished 10th in the 2025 Championship, will play the teams who finished: 5th to 9th and 11th to 13th in the 2025 Championship; and 1st and 2nd in the 2025 League One. Salford, the highest-ranked team having been relegated from the Super League in 2025, will play the 10 teams who finished 3rd to 12th in the 2025 Championship (clubs in 1st and 2nd having been promoted to the 2026 Super League), while Newcastle Thunder, the lowest-ranked team having finished 10th in 2025 League One, will play the nine teams from the 2025 League One plus the 13th placed team from the 2025 Championship.

The final four fixtures are home and away ties against two teams, primarily based on ensuring local derby matches could take place, and then filling up the fixture list to minimise overall travel. These games only include matches between teams that were not previously scheduled: for example, the three most northerly teams - Whitehaven, Workington and Newcastle - were already due to play each other, and so did not have extra games scheduled between them. Rather, all three were given games against the Cumbrian team Barrow, with Workington being drawn against Widnes, Whitehaven against Sheffield and Newcastle against Batley.

After Featherstone withdrew, a new round of replacement fixtures were announced for the clubs due to have played Featherstone. This reverted a decision to not schedule new fixtures, which would have shifted the table to being decided by win percentage rather than competition points. No further information regarding the Championship structure was given at this time other than the postponement of the Halifax game against Sheffield scheduled for 15 February.

== Clubs ==
=== Stadiums and locations ===
2026 Championship clubs
1 Barrow Raiders
2 Batley Bulldogs
3 Dewsbury Rams
4 Doncaster
5 Goole Vikings
6 Halifax Panthers
7 Hunslet
8 Keighley Cougars
9 London Broncos
10 Midlands Hurricanes
11 Newcastle Thunder
12 North Wales Crusaders
13 Oldham
14 Rochdale Hornets
15 Salford RLFC
16 Sheffield Eagles
17 Swinton Lions
18 Whitehaven
19 Widnes Vikings
20 Workington Town

Team	2025 Position	Head coach	Captain	Stadium	Capacity	Grading
Barrow Raiders	9th	Paul Crarey	Ryan Johnston	Craven Park	4,000	B
Batley Bulldogs	12th	James Ford	Alistair Leak, Dane Manning	Mount Pleasant	7,500	B
Dewsbury Rams	4th League One	Paul March	George Senior	Crown Flatt	5,100	C
Doncaster	8th	Richard Horne	Cory Aston	Eco-Power Stadium	15,231	B
Goole Vikings	7th League One	Scott Taylor	Brett Ferres	Victoria Pleasure Grounds	3,000	C
Halifax Panthers	5th	Kyle Eastmond	Ben Crooks	The Shay	10,401	B
Hunslet	13th	Kyle Trout	Billy Jowitt	South Leeds Stadium	3,450	C
Keighley Cougars	9th League One	Danny Burton (interim until round 3); Ian Hardman (from round 4)	Matty Beharrell	Cougar Park	7,800	– (Note: Not graded as required information was not submitted to the RFL on time)
London Broncos	10th	Jason Demetriou	Reagan Campbell-Gillard	Plough Lane	9,215	B
Midlands Hurricanes	5th League One	Mark Dunning	Jon Luke Kirby	Avery Fields	1,500	C
Newcastle Thunder	10th League One	Graham Steadman		Crow Trees Ground	2,000	–
North Wales Crusaders	1st League One	Dean Muir (until round 7); Krisnan Inu (rounds 8–10); Sean Long (rounds 13–14); Mike Grady (rounds 15–20); vacant	Dom Horn	Eirias Stadium	5,500	C
Oldham	4th	Alan Kilshaw	Matty Wildie	Boundary Park (Note: Oldham played their first four home games at Bower Fold due to a dispute over their use of Boundary Park)	13,186	B
Rochdale Hornets	6th League One	Gary Thornton	Ross Whitmore	Spotland Stadium	10,249	C
Salford RLFC	12th Super League (Note: Position achieved by a previous iteration of the club)	Mike Grady (until round 7); Dave Hewitt (interim, from round 8)	Brad Dwyer	Salford Community Stadium	12,000	B
Sheffield Eagles	11th	Craig Lingard	Joel Farrell	Steel City Stadium (until 26 April); Home of Football Stadium (from 24 May)	1,300; 2,000	B
Swinton Lions	3rd League One	Paul Wood (until round 8); Anthony Murray (from round 9)	Gavin Rodden	Heywood Road	3,387	C
Whitehaven	8th League One	Anthony Murray (until round 4); James Newton (interim from round 5)	Jordan Burns	Recreation Ground	7,500	C
Widnes Vikings	7th	Allan Coleman	Jack Owens	Halton Stadium	13,350	B
Workington Town	2nd League One	Jonty Gorley	Stevie Scholey	Derwent Park	10,000	C

== Regular season ==
=== Table ===
Pos	Team	Pld	W	D	L	PF	PA	PD	Pts	Qualification
1	London Broncos	24	23	0	1	1511	296	+1215	46	League Leaders Shield and qualify for Qualifying Finals
2	Newcastle Thunder	24	21	0	3	1093	302	+791	42	Qualifying Finals
3	Oldham	24	21	0	3	787	403	+384	42	Qualifying Semi-Finals
4	Doncaster	24	19	0	5	915	379	+536	38	Qualifying Semi-Finals
5	Widnes Vikings	24	17	0	7	757	356	+401	34	Qualifying Semi-Finals
6	Barrow Raiders	24	17	0	7	649	447	+202	34	Qualifying Semi-Finals
7	Sheffield Eagles	24	16	0	8	637	545	+92	32	Eliminators
8	Midlands Hurricanes	24	13	1	10	652	650	+2	27	Eliminators
9	Whitehaven	24	11	1	12	519	661	−142	23	Eliminators
10	Batley Bulldogs	24	11	0	13	657	573	+84	22	Eliminators
11	Dewsbury Rams	24	8	0	16	522	652	−130	16	
12	Salford	24	8	0	16	544	796	−252	16	
13	Hunslet	24	8	0	16	496	776	−280	16	
14	Goole Vikings	24	8	0	16	532	867	−335	16	
15	Rochdale Hornets	24	8	0	16	403	754	−351	16	
16	Keighley Cougars	24	6	2	16	594	678	−84	14	
17	Swinton Lions	24	6	1	17	488	794	−306	13	
18	Workington Town	24	5	1	18	472	735	−263	11	
19	Halifax Panthers	24	8	0	16	558	668	−110	4 (Note: A 12-point deduction was applied upon re-instatement to the league)	
20	North Wales Crusaders	24	3	0	21	282	1736	−1454	−6 (Note: A 12-point deduction was imposed for insolvency and change of ownership mid-season)	

Source: RFL

== Play-offs ==
A 10 team play-off structure based on the McIntyre system which allows higher qualified teams to lose more games before being eliminated compared to lower qualified teams was introduced for this year.

=== System summary ===
Week 1 (four games)

- 1st–2nd: Bye to week 2 Qualifiers
- 3rd–6th: Qualifiers
  - Winners progress to week 2 Qualifiers
  - Losers progress to week 2 Eliminators
- 7th–10th: Eliminators
  - Winners progress to week 2 Eliminators
  - Losers eliminated

Week 2 (four games)

- Qualifiers
  - Winners bye to week 4
  - Losers progress to week 3
- Eliminators
  - Winners progress to week 3
  - Losers eliminated

Week 3 (two games)

- Preliminary semi-finals
  - Winners progress to week 4
  - Losers eliminated

Week 4 (two games)

- Semi-finals
  - Winners progress to week 5
  - Losers eliminated

Week 5 (one game)

- Grand Final

=== Team bracket ===
Qualifying Semi-Finals and Eliminators
QSF1
3	Oldham	24
5	Widnes Vikings	30
QSF2
4	Doncaster	72
6	Barrow Raiders	0
E1
7	Sheffield Eagles	25
10	Batley Bulldogs	18
E2
8	Midlands Hurricanes	36
9	Whitehaven	4

Qualifying and Elimination Finals
QF1
1	London Broncos	42
4	Doncaster	6
QF2
2	Newcastle Thunder	34
5	Widnes Vikings	16
EF1
3	Oldham	46
8	Midlands Hurricanes	16
EF2
6	Barrow Raiders	26
7	Sheffield Eagles	10

Sudden Death Play-Offs
SD1
4	Doncaster	56
6	Barrow Raiders	12
SD2
5	Widnes Vikings	16
3	Oldham	20

Preliminary Finals
PF1
2	Newcastle Thunder	18
4	Doncaster	33
PF2
1	London Broncos	74
5	Oldham	8

Grand Final
1	London Broncos	78
4	Doncaster	6

== Player statistics ==
=== Top 10 try scorers ===
Rank	Player (s)	Club	Tries
1	(England) Neil Tchamambe	London Broncos	28
1	(Papua New Guinea) Gairo Voro	London Broncos	28
3	(England) Brad Ward	Newcastle Thunder	26
4	(Papua New Guinea) Morea Morea	London Broncos	25
5	(Australia) Luke Smith	London Broncos	21
5	(Wales) Billy Walkley	Sheffield Eagles	21
7	(Australia) Jordan Lipp	Newcastle Thunder	20
8	(Papua New Guinea) Matthew Chrimes	Midlands Hurricanes	19
8	(England) Andy Djeukessi	Newcastle Thunder	19
8	(Papua New Guinea) Luke Forber	North Wales Crusaders / Oldham	19

As of 24 August 2026

=== Top 10 goal scorers ===
Rank	Player (s)	Club	Goals
1	(England) Jimmy Meadows	London Broncos	115
2	(England) Connor Robinson	Doncaster	78
3	(England) Myles Harrison	Newcastle Thunder	75
4	(England) Brad Walker	Barrow Raiders	70
5	(England) Ciaran Walker	Whitehaven	69
6	(England) Jack Miller	Goole Vikings	61
7	(England) Jacob Hookem	Dewsbury Rams	59
7	(England) Sully Medforth	Midlands Hurricanes	59
7	(England) Ben Reynolds	Batley Bulldogs	59
10	(England) Kieran Dixon	Oldham / Salford	55

As of 6 August 2026

=== Top 10 point scorers ===
Rank	Player (s)	Club	Points
1	(England) Jimmy Meadows	London Broncos	258
2	(England) Ciaran Walker	Whitehaven	182
3	(England) Connor Robinson	Doncaster	168
4	(England) Myles Harrison	Newcastle Thunder	166
5	(England) Ben Reynolds	Batley Bulldogs	154
6	(Papua New Guinea) Gairo Voro	London Broncos	152
7	(England) Brad Walker	Barrow Raiders	146
8	(England) Kieran Dixon	Oldham / Salford	134
8	(England) Sully Medforth	Midlands Hurricanes	134
10	(England) Jack Miller	Goole Vikings	130

As of 6 August 2026

== Discipline ==
=== Yellow cards ===
Rank	Player (s)	Club	Cards
1	(England) Luke Broadbent	Barrow Raiders	2
1	(England) Dan Coates	Dewsbury Rams	2
1	(England) Bradley Graham	Dewsbury Rams	2
1	(Ireland) Lachlan Lanskey	Keighley Cougars	2
1	(England) Josh Drinkwater	Oldham R.L.F.C.	2
1	(England) Tom Nisbet	Oldham RLFC	2
3	(England) Brad Dwyer	Barrow Raiders	1
3	(England) Joe Bullock	Barrow Raiders	1
3	(England) Ryan Johnston	Barrow Raiders	1
3	(England) Robbie Butterworth	Batley Bulldogs	1
3	(England) Felix Ellis	Batley Bulldogs	1
3	(England) Bailey O'Connor	Dewsbury Rams	1
3	(England) Jacob Parkinson	Dewsbury Rams	1
3	(England) Luke Briscoe	Doncaster RLFC	1
3	(England) Brett Ferres	Goole Vikings	1
3	(England) Will Brough	Halifax Panthers	1
3	(England) Jacob Fairbank	Halifax Panthers	1
3	(England) Dan Abram	Hunslet RLFC	1
3	(England) Zak Lloyd	Hunslet RLFC	1
3	(England) Alfie Dean	Keighley Cougars	1
3	(Scotland) Izaac Farrell	Keighley Cougars	1
3	(England) David Foggin-Johnston	Keighley Cougars	1
3	(Tonga) Siliva Havili	London Broncos	1
3	(Papua New Guinea) Epel Kapinias	London Broncos	1
3	(Ireland) Oliver Roberts	Midlands Hurricanes	1
3	(England) Mikey Wood	Midlands Hurricanes	1
3	(New Zealand) Mitch Clark	Newcastle Thunder	1
3	(England) Andy Djeukessi	Newcastle Thunder	1
3	(Fiji) King Vuniyayawa	Newcastle Thunder	1
3	(England) Noah Whittingham	Newcastle Thunder	1
3	(England) Harry Coleman	North Wales Crusaders	1
3	(England) Bailey Dawson	North Wales Crusaders	1
3	(England) Josh Eaves	North Wales Crusaders	1
3	(England) Jordy Gibson	North Wales Crusaders	1
3	(New Zealand) Mark Ioane	North Wales Crusaders	1
3	(England) Matthew Lightfoot	North Wales Crusaders	1
3	(England) Dec Patton	North Wales Crusaders	1
3	(England) Junior Westwood	North Wales Crusaders	1
3	(England) Matty Ashurst	Oldham RLFC	1
3	(England) Ted Chapelhow	Oldham RLFC	1
3	(England) Matty Wildie	Oldham RLFC	1
3	(England) Jamie Dallimore	Rochdale Hornets	1
3	(England) Dylan Kelly-Duffy	Rochdale Hornets	1
3	(England) Harry Bowes	Sheffield Eagles	1
3	(England) Alex Foster	Sheffield Eagles	1
3	(England) Josh Hodson	Sheffield Eagles	1
3	(England) Martyn Reilly	Sheffield Eagles	1
3	(England) Deane Meadows	Swinton Lions	1
3	(England) Louie Roberts	Swinton Lions	1
3	(England) George Roby	Swinton Lions	1
3	(Wales) Mike Butt	Widnes Vikings	1
3	(England) Jay Chapelhow	Widnes Vikings	1

=== Red cards ===
Rank	Player (s)	Club	Cards
1	(Scotland) Danny Addy	Dewsbury Rams	1
1	(England) Harry Coleman	North Wales Crusaders	1
1	(England) Will Fernley	North Wales Crusaders	1
1	(England) Jamie Dallimore	Rochdale Hornets	1
1	(Democratic Republic of the Congo) Samuel Kibula	Swinton Lions	1
1	(England) Ellis Nixon	Whitehaven RLFC	1

As of 17 June 2026
