= 2026 RFL Championship season results =

The fixture list for the 2026 RFL Championship was issued on 2 December 2025.
All times are UK local time (UTC±00:00 until 28 March 2026, UTC+01:00 thereafter).

Featherstone were excluded from the Championship on 9 January 2026. While it was initially proposed to leave those dates empty for their opponents, the RFL announced on 19 January that additional fixtures for the 12 clubs affected would be added to the schedule.

== Regular season ==
=== Round 1 ===
Betfred Championship: round one
Home	Score	Away	Match Information
Home	Score	Away	Date and Time	Venue	Referee	Attendance
Salford	0–44	Oldham	16 January 2026, 20:00	Salford Community Stadium	A. Moore
Midlands Hurricanes	10–28	Newcastle Thunder	18 January 2026, 14:00	Avery Fields	A. Williams	413
Barrow Raiders	40–0	Workington Town	18 January 2026, 15:00	Craven Park	M. Lynn	2,003
Doncaster	19–12	Halifax Panthers	18 January 2026, 15:00	Eco-Power Stadium	S. Mikalauskas	1,445
Hunslet	12–20	Dewsbury Rams	18 January 2026, 15:00	South Leeds Stadium	L. Bland	780
Keighley Cougars	32–18	Goole Vikings	18 January 2026, 15:00	Cougar Park	D. Arnold	1,179
London Broncos	44–12	Widnes Vikings	18 January 2026, 15:00	Plough Lane	T. Jones	4,380
Swinton Lions	8–12	Rochdale Hornets	18 January 2026, 15:00	Heywood Road	R. Cox	822
Whitehaven	4–11	Sheffield Eagles	18 January 2026, 15:00	Recreation Ground	K. Moore	824

=== Round 2 ===
Betfred Championship: round two
Home	Score	Away	Match Information
Home	Score	Away	Date and Time	Venue	Referee	Attendance
Barrow Raiders	38–4	Salford	31 January 2026, 18:00	Craven Park	A. Williams	2,170
Dewsbury Rams	22–20	Keighley Cougars	1 February 2026, 14:00	Crown Flatt	A. Belafonte
Midlands Hurricanes	26–24	Doncaster	1 February 2026, 14:00	Avery Fields	K. Moore	332
Halifax Panthers	28–10	Batley Bulldogs	1 February 2026, 15:00	The Shay	T. Jones	1,740
London Broncos	25–8	Oldham	1 February 2026, 15:00	Plough Lane	M. Lynn	2,330
Rochdale Hornets	20–14	Workington Town	1 February 2026, 15:00	Spotland Stadium	C. Hughes	693
Swinton Lions	24–26	Goole Vikings	1 February 2026, 15:00	Heywood Road	S. Mikalauskas	622
Whitehaven	6–54	Newcastle Thunder	1 February 2026, 15:00	Recreation Ground	D. Arnold	809
Widnes Vikings	28–14	North Wales Crusaders	1 February 2026, 15:00	Halton Stadium	R. Cox	4,018

=== Round 3 ===
Betfred Championship: round three
Home	Score	Away	Match Information
Home	Score	Away	Date and Time	Venue	Referee	Attendance
Goole Vikings	14–28	Midlands Hurricanes	14 February 2026, 15:00	Victoria Pleasure Grounds	M. Lynn	672
North Wales Crusaders	48–22	Swinton Lions	14 February 2026, 15:00	Eirias Stadium	K. Moore	424
Batley Bulldogs	12–16	Doncaster	15 February 2026, 15:00	Fox's Biscuits Stadium	T. Jones
Newcastle Thunder	28–38	Dewsbury Rams	15 February 2026, 15:00	Crow Trees Ground	L. Bland
Rochdale Hornets	24–10	Keighley Cougars	15 February 2026, 15:00	Spotland Stadium	S. Mikalauskas	844
Salford	29–18	Hunslet	15 February 2026, 15:00	Salford Community Stadium	D. Arnold
Whitehaven	0–30	Barrow Raiders	15 February 2026, 15:00	Recreation Ground	A. Williams
Workington Town	10–22	Widnes Vikings	15 February 2026, 15:00	Derwent Park	C. Hughes
Halifax Panthers	14–28	Sheffield Eagles	15 May 2026, 19:30 (Note: Originally scheduled for 15 February but postponed when Halifax Panthers went into liquidation.)	The Shay	J. Vella

=== Round 4 ===
Betfred Championship: round four
Home	Score	Away	Match Information
Home	Score	Away	Date and Time	Venue	Referee	Attendance
Oldham	12–18	Widnes Vikings	20 February 2026, 19:45	Bower Fold	T. Jones	1,527
Dewsbury Rams	14–16	Goole Vikings	21 February 2026, 14:00	Crown Flatt	K. Moore	1,412
Sheffield Eagles	22–6	Barrow Raiders	21 February 2026, 15:00	Steel City Stadium	R. Cox	535
Midlands Hurricanes	30–12	Batley Bulldogs	22 February 2026, 14:30	Avery Fields	A. Williams	470
Keighley Cougars	56–14	Whitehaven	22 February 2026, 15:00	Cougar Park	L. Bland	1,328
Newcastle Thunder	20–30	North Wales Crusaders	22 February 2026, 15:00	Crow Trees Ground	M. Lynn
Rochdale Hornets	6–42	Hunslet	22 February 2026, 15:00	Spotland Stadium	A. Belafonte	687
Swinton Lions	6–84	London Broncos	22 February 2026, 15:00	Heywood Road	S. Mikalauskas	662

=== Round 5 ===
Betfred Championship: round five
Home	Score	Away	Match Information
Home	Score	Away	Date and Time	Venue	Referee	Attendance
London Broncos	106–18	North Wales Crusaders	28 February 2026, 19:30	Plough Lane	T. Jones
Midlands Hurricanes	20–40	Oldham	1 March 2026, 14:00	Avery Fields	K. Moore	451
Batley Bulldogs	54–6	Swinton Lions	1 March 2026, 15:00	Fox's Biscuits Stadium	F. Lincoln
Doncaster	78–8	Salford	1 March 2026, 15:00	Eco-Power Stadium	L. Bland	1,896
Hunslet	16–24	Sheffield Eagles	1 March 2026, 15:00	South Leeds Stadium	A. Williams	686
Keighley Cougars	16–16	Workington Town	1 March 2026, 15:00	Cougar Park	C. Hughes	1,156
Whitehaven	20–0	Rochdale Hornets	1 March 2026, 15:00	Recreation Ground	A. Belafonte	460
Widnes Vikings	54–24	Goole Vikings	1 March 2026, 15:00	Halton Stadium	D. Arnold	2,461
Barrow Raiders	26–20	Halifax Panthers	19 April 2026, 15:00 (Note: Originally scheduled for 1 March but postponed when Halifax Panthers went into liquidation.)	Craven Park	A. Belafonte	1,718

=== Round 6 ===
Betfred Championship: round six
Home	Score	Away	Match Information
Home	Score	Away	Date and Time	Venue	Referee	Attendance
Dewsbury Rams	8–20	Barrow Raiders	8 March 2026, 14:00	Crown Flatt	A. Williams
Doncaster	32–16	Goole Vikings	8 March 2026, 15:00	Eco-Power Stadium	R. Cox	1,365
Halifax Panthers	4–42	London Broncos	8 March 2026, 15:00	The Shay	S. Mikalauskas	2,062
North Wales Crusaders	16–30	Batley Bulldogs	8 March 2026, 15:00	Eirias Stadium	M. Lynn
Rochdale Hornets	20–44	Sheffield Eagles	8 March 2026, 15:00	Spotland Stadium	K. Moore	359
Swinton Lions	4–36	Newcastle Thunder	8 March 2026, 15:00	Heywood Road	A. Belafonte	649
Whitehaven	20–20	Midlands Hurricanes	8 March 2026, 15:00	Recreation Ground	L. Bland	590
Widnes Vikings	32–26	Hunslet	8 March 2026, 15:00	Halton Stadium	T. Jones	2,223
Workington Town	52–10	Salford	8 March 2026, 15:00	Derwent Park	M. McKelvey	1,207

=== Round 7 ===
Betfred Championship: round seven
Home	Score	Away	Match Information
Home	Score	Away	Date and Time	Venue	Referee	Attendance
Sheffield Eagles	30–36	Oldham	21 March 2026, 15:00	Steel City Stadium	T. Jones	813
Doncaster	28–12	Widnes Vikings	22 March 2026, 15:00	Eco-Power Stadium	J. Vella	1,672
Halifax Panthers	50–22	North Wales Crusaders	22 March 2026, 15:00	The Shay	M. McKelvey	1,778
Hunslet	24–29	Barrow Raiders	22 March 2026, 15:00	South Leeds Stadium	C. Hughes	746
London Broncos	66–6	Salford	22 March 2026, 15:00	Plough Lane	K. Moore
Newcastle Thunder	44–18	Keighley Cougars	22 March 2026, 15:00	Crow Trees Ground	S. Mikalauskas
Rochdale Hornets	22–28	Midlands Hurricanes	22 March 2026, 15:00	Spotland Stadium	M. Lynn	362
Workington Town	22–38	Dewsbury Rams	22 March 2026, 15:00	Derwent Park	A. Belafonte

=== Round 8 ===
Betfred Championship: round eight
Home	Score	Away	Match Information
Home	Score	Away	Date and Time	Venue	Referee	Attendance
Salford	22–28	Halifax Panthers	27 March 2026, 20:00	Salford Community Stadium	A. Williams	3,125
Dewsbury Rams	16–18	Sheffield Eagles	29 March 2026, 15:00	Crown Flatt	M. Lynn
Doncaster	74–6	Swinton Lions	29 March 2026, 15:00	Eco-Power Stadium	C. Hughes	1,170
Keighley Cougars	12–20	Midlands Hurricanes	29 March 2026, 15:00	Cougar Park	A. Belafonte
London Broncos	40–12	Batley Bulldogs	29 March 2026, 15:00	Plough Lane	R. Cox
Newcastle Thunder	38–8	Workington Town	29 March 2026, 15:00	Crow Trees Ground	K. Moore
North Wales Crusaders	52–20	Whitehaven	29 March 2026, 15:00	Eirias Stadium	L. Bland
Oldham	44–0	Hunslet	29 March 2026, 15:00	Bower Fold	S. Mikalauskas	978
Rochdale Hornets	35–10	Goole Vikings	29 March 2026, 15:00	Spotland Stadium	D. Arnold	324

=== Round 9 ===
Betfred Championship: round nine
Home	Score	Away	Match Information
Home	Score	Away	Date and Time	Venue	Referee	Attendance
Whitehaven	14–22	Workington Town	3 April 2026, 13:00	Recreation Ground	A. Williams	1,448
Barrow Raiders	18–8	Widnes Vikings	3 April 2026, 15:00	Craven Park	R. Cox	2,103
Sheffield Eagles	0–46	Doncaster	3 April 2026, 15:00	Steel City Stadium	S. Mikalauakas	1,194
Oldham	36–10	Rochdale Hornets	3 April 2026, 15:45	Bower Fold	K. Moore	1,376
Batley Bulldogs	21–20	Dewsbury Rams	3 April 2026, 17:00	Fox's Biscuits Stadium	D. Arnold
Goole Vikings	14–32	Newcastle Thunder	3 April 2026, 17:00	Victoria Pleasure Grounds	A. Belafonte	707
Keighley Cougars	30–42	Hunslet	4 April 2026, 13:00	Cougar Park	L. Bland
Swinton Lions	10–20	Salford	5 April 2026, 14:00	Heywood Road	C. Hughes	2,785
North Wales Crusaders	18–56	Midlands Hurricanes	5 April 2026, 15:00	Eirias Stadium	M. Lynn	300

=== Round 10 ===
Betfred Championship: round ten
Home	Score	Away	Match Information
Home	Score	Away	Date and Time	Venue	Referee	Attendance
London Broncos	48–4	Sheffield Eagles	11 April 2026, 18:00	Plough Lane	D. Arnold
Dewsbury Rams	10–20	Widnes Vikings	12 April 2026, 15:00	Crown Flatt	T. Jones
Goole Vikings	22–36	Whitehaven	12 April 2026, 15:00	Victoria Pleasure Grounds	K. Moore
Halifax Panthers	12–28	Oldham	12 April 2026, 15:00	The Shay	R. Cox	2,123
Hunslet	34–32	Newcastle Thunder	12 April 2026, 15:00	South Leeds Stadium	M. Mckelvey	662
Keighley Cougars	66–10	North Wales Crusaders	12 April 2026, 15:00	Cougar Park	A. Williams
Rochdale Hornets	12–46	Barrow Raiders	12 April 2026, 15:00	Spotland Stadium	S. Mikalauskas	370
Salford	29–28	Batley Bulldogs	12 April 2026, 15:00	Salford Community Stadium	A. Belafonte	1,873
Workington Town	20–24	Midlands Hurricanes	12 April 2026, 15:00	Derwent Park	L. Bland

=== Round 11 ===
Betfred Championship: round ten
Home	Score	Away	Match Information
Home	Score	Away	Date and Time	Venue	Referee	Attendance
Newcastle Thunder	37–22	Barrow Raiders	25 April 2026, 16:00	Crow Trees Ground	M. Lynn
Swinton Lions	22–22	Keighley Cougars	26 April 2026, 14:00	Heywood Road	F. Lincoln	777
Batley Bulldogs	46–10	Goole Vikings	26 April 2026, 15:00	Mount Pleasant	S. Mikalauskas
Doncaster	16–30	London Broncos	26 April 2026, 15:00	Eco-Power Stadium	L. Rush	1,546
Oldham	74–4	Workington Town	26 April 2026, 15:00	Bower Fold	L. Bland	790
Rochdale Hornets	18–54	Dewsbury Rams	26 April 2026, 15:00	Spotland Stadium	A. Belafonte	370
Sheffield Eagles	38–26	Salford	26 April 2026, 15:00	Steel City Stadium	K. Moore	912
Whitehaven	10–30	Hunslet	26 April 2026, 15:00	Recreation Ground	D. Arnold	608
Widnes Vikings	54–0	Halifax Panthers	26 April 2026, 15:00	Halton Stadium	R. Cox	2,114

=== Round 12 ===
Betfred Championship: round twelve
Home	Score	Away	Match Information
Home	Score	Away	Date and Time	Venue	Referee	Attendance
Doncaster	48–0 (Note: Match awarded as a 48–0 win to Doncaster after North Wales Crusaders went into insolvency.)	North Wales Crusaders	—N/a
Goole Vikings	10–70	London Broncos	2 May 2026, 15:00	Victoria Pleasure Grounds	A. Belafonte
Newcastle Thunder	52–8	Batley Bulldogs	2 May 2026, 16:00	Crow Trees Ground	A. Williams
Barrow Raiders	18–40	Oldham	3 May 2026, 15:00	Craven Park	R. Cox	1,860
Dewsbury Rams	22–12	Whitehaven	3 May 2026, 15:00	Crown Flatt	K. Moore
Hunslet	6–38	Workington Town	3 May 2026, 15:00	South Leeds Stadium	F. Lincoln
Keighley Cougars	29–20	Halifax Panthers	3 May 2026, 15:00	Cougar Park	D. Arnold	1,826
Swinton Lions	28–10	Midlands Hurricanes	3 May 2026, 15:00	Heywood Road	M. McKelvey	704
Widnes Vikings	16–12	Sheffield Eagles	3 May 2026, 15:00	Halton Stadium	T. Jones	2,016

=== Round 13 ===
Betfred Championship: round thirteen
Home	Score	Away	Match Information
Home	Score	Away	Date and Time	Venue	Referee	Attendance
Oldham	18–10	Doncaster	8 May 2026, 19:30	Boundary Park	M. Lynn	1,177
Rochdale Hornets	6–54	Newcastle Thunder	9 May 2026, 13:00	Spotland Stadium	D. Arnold
Goole Vikings	80–0	North Wales Crusaders	9 May 2026, 15:00	Victoria Pleasure Grounds	L. Seal	352
Keighley Cougars	22–26	Batley Bulldogs	10 May 2026, 15:00	Cougar Park	K. Moore
Halifax Panthers	30–16	Dewsbury Rams	10 May 2026, 15:00	The Shay	A. Williams	1,821
London Broncos	64–0	Midlands Hurricanes	10 May 2026, 15:00	Plough Lane	A. Belafonte
Salford	6–32	Widnes Vikings	10 May 2026, 15:00	Salford Community Stadium	S. Mikalauskas
Swinton Lions	40–12	Whitehaven	10 May 2026, 15:00	Heywood Road	C. Hughes	733
Workington Town	16–28	Sheffield Eagles	10 May 2026, 15:00	Derwent Park	M. McKelvey

=== Additional round ===
One fixture were slotted into the schedule before round 14. This was an additional fixture added to the schedule for the clubs involved when Featherstone Rovers were excluded from the league.

Betfred Championship: Additipnal round
Home	Score	Away	Match Information
Home	Score	Away	Date and Time	Venue	Referee	Attendance
Doncaster	12–36	Barrow Raiders	20 May 2026, 19:30	Eco-Power Stadium	K. Moore	1,465

=== Round 14 ===
Betfred Championship: round fourteen
Home	Score	Away	Match Information
Home	Score	Away	Date and Time	Venue	Referee	Attendance
Newcastle Thunder	62–10	Goole Vikings	22 May 2026, 19:30	Crow Trees Ground	F. Lincoln
Oldham	30–10	Midlands Hurricanes	22 May 2026, 19:45	Boundary Park	R. Cox	1,012
Barrow Raiders	36–22	Hunslet	24 May 2026, 15:00	Craven Park	C. Hughes	1,892
Batley Bulldogs	108–10	North Wales Crusaders	24 May 2026, 15:00	Mount Pleasant	L. Seal
Dewsbury Rams	32–6	Workington Town	24 May 2026, 15:00	Crown Flatt	A. Williams
Halifax Panthers	28–34	Salford	24 May 2026, 15:00	The Shay	L. Bland	1,749
Rochdale Hornets	36–32	Swinton Lions	24 May 2026, 15:00	Spotland Stadium	K. Moore
Sheffield Eagles	10–72	London Broncos	24 May 2026, 15:00	Home of Football Stadium	S. Mikalauskas	707
Whitehaven	16–14	Keighley Cougars	24 May 2026, 15:00	Recreation Ground	M. McKelvey	585

=== Additional round ===
Two fixtures were slotted into the schedule for the Sunday after the Challenge Cup final. These were additional fixtures added to the schedule for the clubs involved when Featherstone Rovers were excluded from the league.

Betfred Championship: Additional round
Home	Score	Away	Match Information
Home	Score	Away	Date and Time	Venue	Referee	Attendance
Hunslet	18–54	London Broncos	31 May 2026, 15:00	South Leeds Stadium	D. Arnold	951
North Wales Crusaders	0–86	Salford	31 May 2026, 15:00	Eirias Stadium	A. Belafonte	908

=== Round 15 ===
Betfred Championship: round fifteen
Home	Score	Away	Match Information
Home	Score	Away	Date and Time	Venue	Referee	Attendance
Midlands Hurricanes	24–30	Whitehaven	6 June 2026, 14:00	Avery Fields	A. Belafonte	267
Goole Vikings	4–50	Batley Bulldogs	6 June 2026, 15:00	Victoria Pleasure Grounds	M. McKelvey
Newcastle Thunder	52–6	Hunslet	6 June 2026, 16:00	Crow Trees Ground	K. Moore
Keighley Cougars	22–34	Rochdale Hornets	7 June 2026, 15:00	Cougar Park	C. Hughes	928
North Wales Crusaders	0–134	London Broncos	7 June 2026, 15:00	Eirias Stadium	F. Lincoln
Salford	16–44	Doncaster	7 June 2026, 15:00	Salford Community Stadium	A. Williams
Swinton Lions	22–24	Halifax Panthers	7 June 2026, 15:00	Edge Hall Road (Note: Game moved due to ongoing pitch works at Heywood Road.)	L. Seal	551
Widnes Vikings	46–0	Dewsbury Rams	7 June 2026, 15:00	Halton Stadium	M. Lynn
Workington Town	12–56	Barrow Raiders	7 June 2026, 15:00	Derwent Park	L. Bland	1,061

=== Round 16 ===
The fixtures involving Rochdale, Widnes and Midlands were all postponed as those teams were playing in the semi-finals of the 1895 Cup on the same weekend.

Betfred Championship: round sixteen
Home	Score	Away	Match Information
Home	Score	Away	Date and Time	Venue	Referee	Attendance
Barrow Raiders	18–16	Sheffield Eagles	13 June 2026, 18:00	Craven Park	A. Belafonte	1,398
Batley Bulldogs	26–22	Halifax Panthers	14 June 2026, 15:00	Mount Pleasant	K. Moore
Hunslet	22–12	Salford	14 June 2026, 15:00	South Leeds Stadium	C. Hughes
Keighley Cougars	0–74	Newcastle Thunder	14 June 2026, 15:00	Cougar Park	M. McKelvey
Whitehaven	80–12	North Wales Crusaders	14 June 2026, 15:00	Recreation Ground	L. Seal	609
Workington Town	24–28	Oldham	14 June 2026, 15:00	Derwent Park	A. Williams	1,058
Midlands Hurricanes	38–22	Goole Vikings	23 June 2026, 19:30	Avery Fields	L. Seal	208
Widnes Vikings	6–26	Doncaster	1 July 2026, 19:00	Halton Stadium	S. Mikalauskas	1,580
Dewsbury Rams	22–34	Rochdale Hornets	19 August 2026, 19:00	Crown Flatt	D. Arnold

=== Round 17 ===
Betfred Championship: round seventeen
Home	Score	Away	Match Information
Home	Score	Away	Date and Time	Venue	Referee	Attendance
Midlands Hurricanes	6–24	Swinton Lions	20 June 2026, 13:00	Avery Fields	C. Hughes	330
Goole Vikings	50–16	Keighley Cougars	20 June 2026, 15:00	Victoria Pleasure Grounds	F. Lincoln
Barrow Raiders	39–28	Dewsbury Rams	20 June 2026, 18:00	Craven Park	M. McKelvey	2,311
Hunslet	0–48	Widnes Vikings	21 June 2026, 15:00	South Leeds Stadium	T. Grant	875
Newcastle Thunder	66–0	Rochdale Hornets	21 June 2026, 15:00	Crow Trees Ground	K. Moore
North Wales Crusaders	0–94	Halifax Panthers	21 June 2026, 15:00	Eirias Stadium	A. Belafonte	234
Oldham	26–6	Batley Bulldogs	21 June 2026, 15:00	Crown Flatt	R. Cox
Salford	52–28	Workington Town	21 June 2026, 15:00	Salford Community Stadium	S. Mikalauskas
Sheffield Eagles	50–14	Whitehaven	21 June 2026, 15:00	Home of Football Stadium	D. Arnold	502

=== Round 18 ===
Betfred Championship: round eighteen
Home	Score	Away	Match Information
Home	Score	Away	Date and Time	Venue	Referee	Attendance
Widnes Vikings	10–28	Oldham	26 June 2026, 19:30	Halton Stadium	M. Lynn	2,677
Goole Vikings	24–18	Rochdale Hornets	27 June 2026, 15:00	Victoria Pleasure Grounds	M. McKelvey
Newcastle Thunder	50–6	Whitehaven	27 June 2026, 16:00	Crow Trees Ground	A. Williams
Batley Bulldogs	12–64	London Broncos	28 June 2026, 15:00	Mount Pleasant	S. Mikalauskas
Halifax Panthers	12–50	Doncaster	28 June 2026, 15:00	The Shay	D. Arnold	1,603
Keighley Cougars	18–40	Swinton Lions	28 June 2026, 15:00	Cougar Park	K. Moore
Salford	20–22	Barrow Raiders	28 June 2026, 15:00	Salford Community Stadium	L. Bland
Sheffield Eagles	42–30	Dewsbury Rams	28 June 2026, 15:00	Home Of Football Stadium	R. Cox	565
Workington Town	40–14	Hunslet	28 June 2026, 15:00	Derwent Park	A. Belafonte

=== Additional round ===
Five additional fixtures were slotted into the schedule before round 19. These were additional fixtures added to the schedule for the clubs involved when Featherstone Rovers were excluded from the league.

Betfred Championship: Additional round
Home	Score	Away	Match Information
Home	Score	Away	Date and Time	Venue	Referee	Attendance
Batley Bulldogs	14–20	Oldham	3 July 2026, 19:30	Mount Pleasant	K. Moore
Goole Vikings	0–52	Widnes Vikings	4 July 2026, 15:00	Victoria Pleasure Grounds	A. Belafonte
London Broncos	78–16	Hunslet	4 July 2026, 15:00	Stonebridge Road	A. Williams
Halifax Panthers	30–22	Swinton Lions	5 July 2026, 15:00	The Shay	M. Lynn	1,429
Salford	64–4	North Wales Crusaders	5 July 2026, 15:00	Salford Community Stadium	C. Hughes

=== Round 19 ===
Betfred Championship: round nineteen
Home	Score	Away	Match Information
Home	Score	Away	Date and Time	Venue	Referee	Attendance
Barrow Raiders	6–30	Newcastle Thunder	11 July 2026, 18:00	Craven Park	R. Cox	3,300
London Broncos	68–18	Doncaster	11 July 2026, 18:00	Stonebridge Road	D. Arnold
Batley Bulldogs	30–34	Midlands Hurricanes	12 July 2026, 15:00	Mount Pleasant	F. Lincoln
North Wales Crusaders	6–116	Widnes Vikings	12 July 2026, 15:00	Eirias Stadium	J. Pemberton	733
Oldham	36–18	Halifax Panthers	12 July 2026, 15:00	Boundary Park	S. Mikalauskas
Salford	24–30	Sheffield Eagles	12 July 2026, 15:00	Salford Community Stadium	A. Williams
Whitehaven	34–24	Swinton Lions	12 July 2026, 15:00	Recreation Ground	C. Hughes	660
Keighley Cougars	16–26	Dewsbury Rams	29 July 2026, 19:45 (Note: March postponed on 12 July, pitch unplayable)	Rose Cottage	D. Arnold

=== Round 20 ===
Betfred Championship: round twenty
Home	Score	Away	Match Information
Home	Score	Away	Date and Time	Venue	Referee	Attendance
Widnes Vikings	24–8	Barrow Raiders	18 July 2026, 17:00	Halton Stadium	J. Vella	1,916
Midlands Hurricanes	42–4	Rochdale Hornets	19 July 2026, 13:00	Avery Fields	A. Belafonte	200
Sheffield Eagles	38–12	Workington Town	19 July 2026, 13:30	Home Of Football Stadium	K. Moore	535
Whitehaven	46–16	Goole Vikings	19 July 2026, 13:30	Recreation Ground	F. Lincoln	620
Dewsbury Rams	18–36	Halifax Panthers	19 July 2026, 15:00	Crown Flatt	T. Jones
Hunslet	16–60	Oldham	19 July 2026, 15:00	South Leeds Stadium	M. McKelvey	858
North Wales Crusaders	0–90	Newcastle Thunder	19 July 2026, 15:00	Eirias Stadium	A. Williams
Salford	4–62	London Broncos	19 July 2026, 15:00	Salford Community Stadium	R. Cox
Swinton Lions	0–56	Doncaster	19 July 2026, 15:00	Heywood Road	S. Mikalauskas

=== Round 21 ===
Betfred Championship: round twenty-one
Home	Score	Away	Match Information
Home	Score	Away	Date and Time	Venue	Referee	Attendance
Doncaster	22–10	Batley Bulldogs	24 July 2026, 19:30	Club Doncaster Sports Village	M. McKelvey	1,212
Widnes Vikings	52–8	Salford	24 July 2026, 19:30	Halton Stadium	R. Cox	2,362
Goole Vikings	28–24	Dewsbury Rams	25 July 2026, 15:00	Victoria Pleasure Grounds	D. Arnold
Newcastle Thunder	34–10	Swinton Lions	25 July 2026, 16:00	Crow Trees Ground	C. Hughes	194
Midlands Hurricanes	16–78	London Broncos	26 July 2026, 14:00	Avery Fields	F. Lincoln	489
Hunslet	16–18	Whitehaven	26 July 2026, 15:00	South Leeds Stadium	L. Bland
Oldham	28–16	Barrow Raiders	26 July 2026, 15:00	Boundary Park	S. Mikalauskas
Sheffield Eagles	56–6	Rochdale Hornets	26 July 2026, 15:00	Home Of Football Stadium	A. Williams	547
Workington Town	36–24	Keighley Cougars	26 July 2026, 15:00	Derwent Park	K. Moore	826

=== Round 22 ===
Betfred Championship: round twenty-two
Home	Score	Away	Match Information
Home	Score	Away	Date and Time	Venue	Referee	Attendance
Barrow Raiders	24–14	Rochdale Hornets	1 August 2026, 18:00	Craven Park	L. Bland	1,579
Midlands Hurricanes	46–6	Keighley Cougars	2 August 2026, 14:00	Avery Fields	A. Williams	302
Swinton Lions	12–30	Batley Bulldogs	2 August 2026, 14:00	Heywood Road	C. Hughes	862
Dewsbury Rams	20–30	Hunslet	2 August 2026, 15:00	Crown Flatt	L. Seal
Doncaster	46–18	Oldham	2 August 2026, 15:00	Club Doncaster Sports Village	K. Moore
North Wales Crusaders	6–68	Goole Vikings	2 August 2026, 15:00	Eirias Stadium	J. Pemberton	364
Sheffield Eagles	48–16	Halifax Panthers	2 August 2026, 15:00	Home Of Football Stadium	A. Belafonte	783
Widnes Vikings	36–42	London Broncos	2 August 2026, 15:00	Halton Stadium	M. Lynn	2,011
Workington Town	16–40	Newcastle Thunder	2 August 2026, 15:00	Derwent Park	F. Lincoln

=== Round 23 ===
Betfred Championship: round twenty-three
Home	Score	Away	Match Information
Home	Score	Away	Date and Time	Venue	Referee	Attendance
Salford	18–20	Swinton Lions	8 August 2026, 14:00	Brick Community Stadium	A. Williams
Midlands Hurricanes	30–24	Workington Town	9 August 2026, 14:00	Avery Fields	K. Moore	350
Batley Bulldogs	24–28	Newcastle Thunder	9 August 2026, 15:00	Mount Pleasant	S. Mikalauskas	1,237
Doncaster	120–0	North Wales Crusaders	9 August 2026, 15:00	Club Doncaster Sports Village	L. Seal
Halifax Panthers	20–28	Barrow Raiders	9 August 2026, 15:00	The Shay	M. Lynn	1,434
Hunslet	32–18	Keighley Cougars	9 August 2026, 15:00	South Leeds Stadium	A. Belafonte
London Broncos	92–6	Goole Vikings	9 August 2026, 15:00	Plough Lane	F. Lincoln
Oldham	31–30	Sheffield Eagles	9 August 2026, 15:00	Boundary Park	R. Cox	1,125
Rochdale Hornets	22–24	Whitehaven	9 August 2026, 15:00	Spotland Stadium	C. Hughes	1,296

=== Additional round ===
One fixture was slotted into the schedule before round 24. This was an additional fixture added to the schedule for the clubs involved when Featherstone Rovers were excluded from the league.

Betfred Championship: Additipnal round
Home	Score	Away	Match Information
Home	Score	Away	Date and Time	Venue	Referee	Attendance
Barrow Raiders	25–26	Doncaster	12 August 2026, 19:30	Craven Park	K. Moore	1,396

=== Round 24 ===
Betfred Championship: round twenty-four
Home	Score	Away	Match Information
Home	Score	Away	Date and Time	Venue	Referee	Attendance
Swinton Lions	60–10	North Wales Crusaders	16 August 2026, 13:00	Heywood Road	C. Hughes	693
Batley Bulldogs	22–18	Keighley Cougars	16 August 2026, 15:00	Mount Pleasant	L. Seal
Doncaster	44–16	Midlands Hurricanes	16 August 2026, 15:00	Club Doncaster Sports Village	S. Mikalauskas	1,533
Halifax Panthers	10–11	Widnes Vikings	16 August 2026, 15:00	The Shay	T. Jones	1,588
Oldham	34–24	London Broncos	16 August 2026, 15:00	Boundary Park	M. Lynn	1,345
Sheffield Eagles	28–26	Hunslet	16 August 2026, 15:00	Home Of Football Stadium	F. Lincoln	571
Whitehaven	34–12	Dewsbury Rams	16 August 2026, 15:00	Recreation Ground	A. Belafonte	890
Workington Town	20–22	Rochdale Hornets	16 August 2026, 16:00	Derwent Park	L. Bland

=== Round 25 ===
Betfred Championship: round twenty-five
Home	Score	Away	Match Information
Home	Score	Away	Date and Time	Venue	Referee	Attendance
Goole Vikings	32–28	Swinton Lions	22 August 2026, 15:00	Victoria Pleasure Grounds	M. Clayton
Newcastle Thunder	56–20	Midlands Hurricanes	22 August 2026, 16:00	Crow Trees Ground	D. Arnold
Barrow Raiders	42–20	Whitehaven	23 August 2026, 15:00	Craven Park	F. Lincoln	2,336
Dewsbury Rams	26–48	Batley Bulldogs	23 August 2026, 15:00	Crown Flatt	L. Bland
Doncaster	24–18	Sheffield Eagles	23 August 2026, 15:00	Club Doncaster Sports Village	J. Vella	2,796
Hunslet	28–18	Rochdale Hornets	23 August 2026, 15:00	South Leeds Stadium	O. Maddock
London Broncos	58–12	Halifax Panthers	23 August 2026, 15:00	Plough Lane	C. Hughes
North Wales Crusaders	6–90	Keighley Cougars	23 August 2026, 15:00	Eirias Stadium	L. Breheny	500
Oldham	36–28	Salford	23 August 2026, 15:00	Boundary Park	L. Seal	1,752
Widnes Vikings	40–12	Workington Town	23 August 2026, 15:00	Halton Stadium	J. Pemberton	2,183

=== Round 26 ===
Betfred Championship: round twenty-six
Home	Score	Away	Match Information
Home	Score	Away	Date and Time	Venue	Referee	Attendance
Sheffield Eagles	12–8	Widnes Vikings	27 August 2026, 19:30	Home Of Football Stadium	K. Moore	669
Goole Vikings	14–36	Doncaster	29 August 2026, 15:00	Victoria Pleasure Grounds	C. Hughes	1,083
Dewsbury Rams	6–56	Newcastle Thunder	29 August 2026, 15:00	Crown Flatt	F. Lincoln
Midlands Hurricanes	98–0	North Wales Crusaders	30 August 2026, 14:00	Avery Fields	L. Bland	363
Batley Bulldogs	16–18	Salford	30 August 2026, 15:00	Mount Pleasant	R. Cox	1,440
Halifax Panthers	18–19	Keighley Cougars	30 August 2026, 15:00	The Shay	D. Arnold	1,680
Rochdale Hornets	14–32	Oldham	30 August 2026, 15:00	Spotland Stadium	S. Mikalauskas	2,087
Workington Town	20–29	Whitehaven	30 August 2026, 15:00	Derwent Park	A. Belafonte	1,811
London Broncos	66–18	Swinton Lions	5 September 2026, 14:00	Richmond Athletic Ground	A. Williams

== Play-offs ==
=== Team bracket ===
Qualifying Semi-Finals and Eliminators
QSF1
3	Oldham	24
5	Widnes Vikings	30
QSF2
4	Doncaster	72
6	Barrow Raiders	0
E1
7	Sheffield Eagles	25
10	Batley Bulldogs	18
E2
8	Midlands Hurricanes	36
9	Whitehaven	4

Qualifying and Elimination Finals
QF1
1	London Broncos	42
4	Doncaster	6
QF2
2	Newcastle Thunder	34
5	Widnes Vikings	16
EF1
3	Oldham	46
8	Midlands Hurricanes	16
EF2
6	Barrow Raiders	26
7	Sheffield Eagles	10

Sudden Death Play-Offs
SD1
4	Doncaster	56
6	Barrow Raiders	12
SD2
5	Widnes Vikings	16
3	Oldham	20

Preliminary Finals
PF1
2	Newcastle Thunder	18
4	Doncaster	33
PF2
1	London Broncos	74
5	Oldham	8

Grand Final
1	London Broncos	78
4	Doncaster	6

=== Qualifying Semi Finals ===
Betfred Championship: Qualifying Semi Finals
Home	Score	Away	Match Information
Home	Score	Away	Date and Time	Venue	Referee	Attendance
Doncaster (4)	72–0	Barrow Raiders (6)	6 September 2026, 15:00	Club Doncaster Sports Village	R. Cox	728
Oldham (3)	24–30	Widnes Vikings (5)	6 September 2026, 15:00	Boundary Park	J. Vella	1,638

=== Eliminators ===
Betfred Championship: Eliminators
Home	Score	Away	Match Information
Home	Score	Away	Date and Time	Venue	Referee	Attendance
Midlands Hurricanes (8)	36–4	Whitehaven (9)	5 September 2026, 14:00	Avery Fields	D. Arnold	319
Sheffield Eagles (7)	25–18	Batley Bulldogs (10)	6 September 2026, 15:00	Home Of Football Stadium	S. Mikalauskas	632

=== Qualifying Finals ===
Betfred Championship: Qualifying Finals
Home	Score	Away	Match Information
Home	Score	Away	Date and Time	Venue	Referee	Attendance
Newcastle Thunder (2)	34–16	Widnes Vikings (5)	12 September 2026, 17:00	Crow Trees Ground	L. Rush
London Broncos (1)	42–6	Doncaster (4)	13 September 2026, 15:00	Plough Lane	J. Vella

=== Elimination Finals ===
Betfred Championship: Elimination Finals
Home	Score	Away	Match Information
Home	Score	Away	Date and Time	Venue	Referee	Attendance
Barrow Raiders (6)	26–10	Sheffield Eagles (7)	13 September 2026, 15:00	Craven Park	S. Mikalauskas	1,103
Oldham (3)	46–16	Midlands Hurricanes (8)	13 September 2026, 15:00	Boundary Park	R. Cox	1,006

=== Sudden Death ===
Betfred Championship: Sudden Death
Home	Score	Away	Match Information
Home	Score	Away	Date and Time	Venue	Referee	Attendance
Doncaster (4)	56–12	Barrow Raiders (6)	20 September 2026, 15:00	Club Doncaster Sports Village	M. Lynn	629
Widnes Vikings (5)	16–20 (Note: After golden point extra time)	Oldham (3)	20 September 2026, 15:00	DCBL Stadium	L. Rush

=== Preliminary Finals ===
Betfred Championship: Preliminary Finals
Home	Score	Away	Match Information
Home	Score	Away	Date and Time	Venue	Referee	Attendance
Newcastle Thunder (2)	18–33	Doncaster (3)	26 September 2026, 17:00	Crow Trees Ground	J. Vella
London Broncos (1)	74–8	Oldham (5)	27 September 2026, 15:00	Plough Lane	T. Jones

=== Grand Final ===
Betfred Championship: Grand Final
Home	Score	Away	Match Information
Home	Score	Away	Date and Time	Venue	Referee	Attendance
London Broncos	78–6	Doncaster	4 October 2026, 15:00	Plough Lane	L. Rush
