= Koso Bandi =

PNG international rugby league footballer

Personal information
- Full name: Koso Bandi
- Born: 8 December 1999 (age 26) Mt. Hagen, Papua New Guinea
- Height: 181 cm (5 ft 11 in)
- Weight: 105 kg (16 st 7 lb)

Playing information
- Position: Second-row
Club
Years	Team	Pld	T	G	FG	P
2023	PNG Hunters	25	0	0	0	0
Representative
Years	Team	Pld	T	G	FG	P
2024–26	PNG Prime Minister's XIII	2	0	0	0	0
2024–	Papua New Guinea	1	0	0	0	0
- Source: As of 3 October 2026

Koso Bandi is a Papua New Guinean professional rugby league footballer who plays as a prop for the PNG Hunters in the QLD Cup and Papua New Guinea at international level.

== Career ==
Bandi made his international debut for Papua New Guinea in their 22–10 victory over Fiji Bati in the 2024 Pacific Test.

=== 2026 ===
He played for PNG Prime Minister's XIII on 3 October 2026 in the 10-60 defeat to Prime Minister's XIII in Port Moresby.
