= 2026 RFL 1895 Cup =

Rugby league competition in the United Kingdom

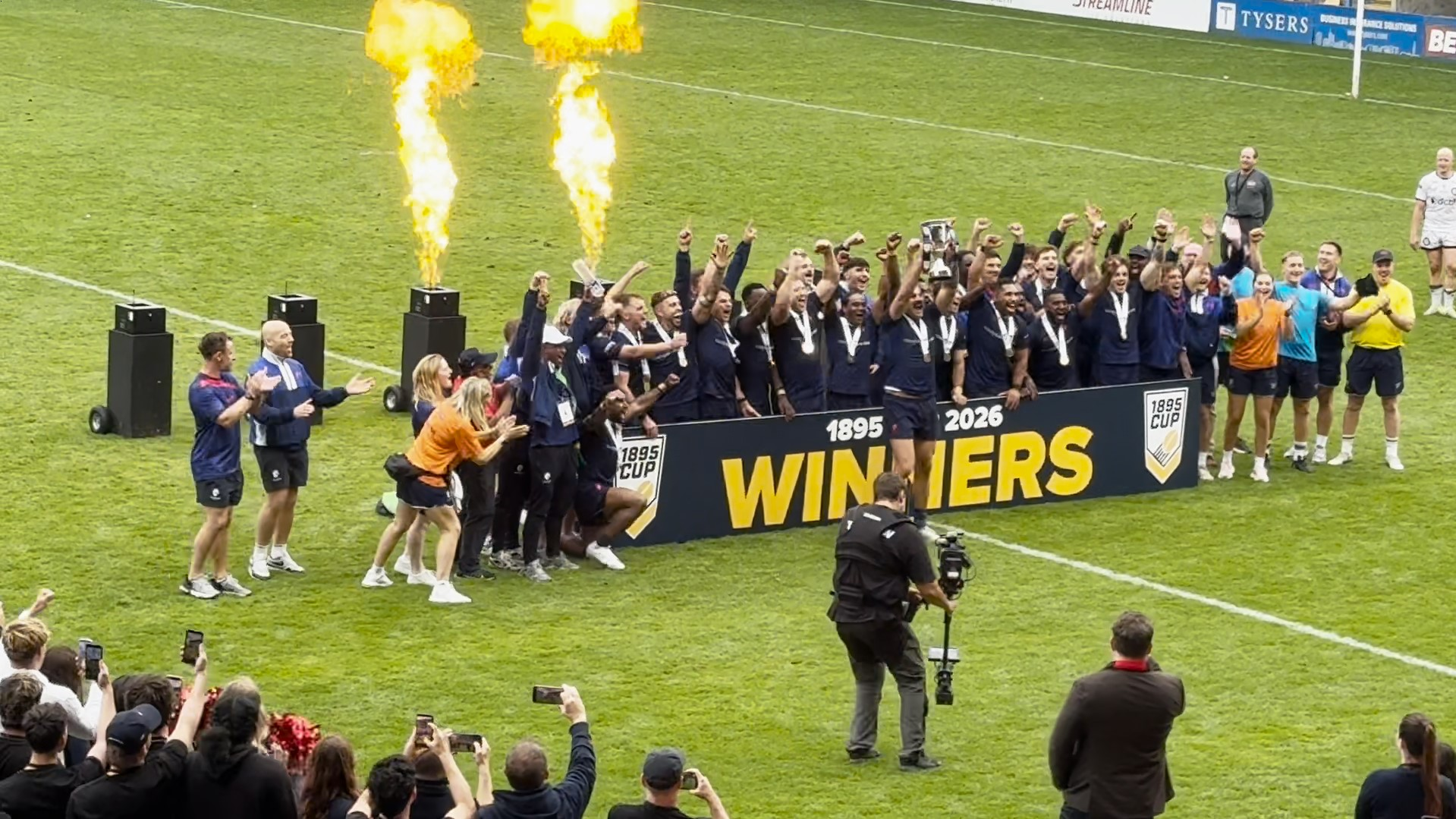
- London Broncos celebrating winning the final
- Duration: March – August 2026
- Number of teams: 19
- Winners: London Broncos
- Runners-up: Widnes Vikings

The 2026 RFL 1895 Cup was the seventh staging of the RFL 1895 Cup, a rugby league competition for English and Welsh clubs competing outside of Super League. The merger of the Championship and League One made the competition solely for Championship clubs.

The cup was won by London Broncos who beat Widnes Vikings 32–10 in the final on 31 August 2026.

== Format ==
The tournament for 2026 had a slightly revised format from previous years, with just the single preliminary round, down from two preliminary rounds in 2025.

The final was not played at Wembley Stadium, as had been the case for previous seasons. After the semi-finals had been played, the venue for the final was announced as the Halliwell Jones Stadium, the home of Super League team Warrington Wolves.

== Preliminary round ==
The preliminary round comprised three ties, drawn from the 16 teams no longer in the 2026 Challenge Cup. The ties were played over the weekend of 14/15 March.

1895 Cup preliminary round fixtures
Home	Score	Away	Match Information
Home	Score	Away	Date and Time	Venue	Referee	Attendance
London Broncos	36–10	Barrow Raiders	15 March 2026, 15:00	Richmond Athletic Ground	A. Belafonte
Swinton Lions	0–50	Sheffield Eagles	15 March 2026, 15:00	Heywood Road	R. Cox	230
Workington Town	12–28	Newcastle Thunder	15 March 2026, 15:30	Derwent Park	D. Arnold	602

== First round ==
Drawn concurrently with the preliminary round on 15 February, the first round comprised eight ties; the winners of the preliminary round, the 10 teams who were not drawn for the preliminary round, and the three teams who qualified for the fourth round of the Challenge Cup – Goole Vikings, Keighley Cougars and Oldham. The ties were played over the weekend of 18/19 April.

1895 Cup round 1 fixtures
Home	Score	Away	Match Information
Home	Score	Away	Date and Time	Venue	Referee	Attendance
Doncaster	64–0	Salford	18 April 2026, 15:00	Eco-Power Stadium	D. Arnold	735
Dewsbury Rams	10–50	Widnes Vikings	19 April 2026, 15:00	Crown Flatt	C. Kendall
Goole Vikings	40–10	Whitehaven	19 April 2026, 15:00	Victoria Pleasure Grounds	L. Bland
London Broncos	62–6	Keighley Cougars	19 April 2026, 15:00	Richmond Athletic Ground	A. Williams
Newcastle Thunder	34–20	Batley Bulldogs	19 April 2026, 15:00	Crow Trees Ground	K. Moore
North Wales Crusaders	C–C	Midlands Hurricanes	Tie cancelled due to ongoing off-field issues at North Wales Crusaders. Midlands Hurricanes received a bye to the quarter finals.
Oldham	72–24	Hunslet	19 April 2026, 15:00	Bower Fold	S. Mikalauskas	740
Rochdale Hornets	32–18	Sheffield Eagles	19 April 2026, 15:00	Spotland Stadium	R. Cox	245

== Quarter-finals ==
The quarter-final draw was made on 19 April. The ties were played over the weekend of 16/17 May.

1895 Cup quarter-final fixtures
Home	Score	Away	Match Information
Home	Score	Away	Date and Time	Venue	Referee	Attendance
Oldham	34–40	Midlands Hurricanes	15 May 2026, 19:45	Boundary Park	D. Arnold	1,004
Rochdale Hornets	24–6	Goole Vikings	17 May 2026, 15:00	Spotland Stadium	S. Mikalauskas	395
Widnes Vikings	30–20	Newcastle Thunder	17 May 2026, 15:00	Robin Park Arena	M. Lynn	596
London Broncos	52–20	Doncaster	17 May 2026, 15:30	Richmond Athletic Ground	R. Cox

== Semi-finals ==
The semi-final draw was made on 18 May. The ties were played over the weekend of 13/14 June. Rochdale were drawn at home against Widnes but with ground work being carried out at Spotland Stadium, both teams agreed to move the fixture to Widnes' Halton Stadium.

1895 Cup semi-final fixtures
Home	Score	Away	Match Information
Home	Score	Away	Date and Time	Venue	Referee	Attendance
Midlands Hurricanes	24–62	London Broncos	13 June 2026, 14:00	Avery Fields	M. Lynn	519
Widnes Vikings	52–0	Rochdale Hornets	14 June 2026, 15:00	Halton Stadium	S. Mikalauskas	2,190

== Final ==
The final was played on 31 August.

1895 Cup Final
Home	Score	Away	Match Information
Home	Score	Away	Date and Time	Venue	Referee	Attendance
London Broncos	32–10	Widnes Vikings	31 August 2026, 15:00	Halliwell Jones Stadium	T. Grant	4,829

== External list ==
- The 1895 Cup draw and format confirmed for 2026
