= Rob Oakley =

Rob Oakley may refer to:

- Rob Oakley (equestrian) (born 1962), Australian equestrian
- Rob Oakley (rugby league) (born 1999), Scotland international rugby league footballer

== See also ==
- Robert Oakley (disambiguation)
