= Brandon Webster-Mansfield =

Australian professional rugby league footballer

Brandon Webster Mansfield

Personal information
- Full name: Brandon Webster-Mansfield
- Born: 1 September 2001 (age 25) Campbelltown, Sydney, New South Wales, Australia
- Height: 6 ft 2 in (1.87 m)
- Weight: 16 st 1 lb (102 kg)

Playing information
- Position: Centre, Wing
Club
Years	Team	Pld	T	G	FG	P
2025	Villefranche	4	3	0	0	12
2025–	London Broncos	30	26	2	0	108
	Total	34	29	2	0	120
- Source: As of 15 November 2026

Brandon Webster-Mansfield (born 1 September 2001) is an Australian professional rugby league footballer who plays as a centre or winger for the London Broncos in the Super League.

He previously played for Villefranche XIII Aveyron in the French Super XIII competition.

== Early life ==
Webster-Mansfield was born in Campbelltown, Sydney, New South Wales, Australia.

He played for the Campbelltown Collegians club as a junior. He attended school at St Gregory's College, Campbelltown.

Webster-Mansfield came through the junior system at the Wests Tigers, playing in their Harold Matthews Cup side in 2017 and the Laurie Daley Cup team in 2018. Webster-Mansfield played in the Wests Tigers Jersey Flegg Cup side between 2020 and 2022. He played as a second-row forward in his early career.

== Career ==
=== Western Suburbs Magpies ===
Webster-Mansfield playing for Western Suburbs in the New South Wales Cup in 2023

He spent 2023 in the NSW Cup with the Western Suburbs Magpies, playing 18 games and scoring 6 tries.

=== St George Illawarra Dragons ===
Webster-Mansfield joined the St George Illawarra Dragons ahead of the 2024 NSW Cup season, but left after playing just the single game.

=== South Sydney Rabbitohs ===
He joined the South Sydney Rabbitohs during the 2024 NSW Cup season, playing 11 games and scoring 3 tries.

=== Villefranche XIII Aveyron ===
Webster-Mansfield played for Villefranche XIII Aveyron in the French Super XIII competition in the 2024–2025 season.

=== London Broncos ===
On 28 May 2025 it was reported that he had signed for the London Broncos in the RFL Championship, signing an 18 month deal that would keep him in the capital until the end of 2026.

On 7 June 2026, Webster-Mansfield equalled Martin Offiah and Sean Morris' record of five tries in a game in the 134–0 victory over the North Wales Crusaders at the Eirias Stadium in the RFL Championship.

In August 2026, he was part of the Broncos squad that lifted the RFL Championship Leaders' Shield.

Webster-Mansfield played in London's 1895 Cup Final victory over the Widnes Vikings at the Halliwell Jones Stadium in August 2026.

In October 2026, he played in the Broncos Championship Grand Final victory over Doncaster at Plough Lane.

Webster-Mansfield signed a new two year deal with the Broncos which will take him through to the end of the 2028 Super League season.

== Club statistics ==
Year	Club	League Competition	Appearances	Tries	Goals	Drop goals	Points	Notes
2023	Western Suburbs Magpies	2023 NSW Cup season	18	6	0	0	24	
2024	St George Illawarra Dragons	2024 NSW Cup season	1	0	0	0	0	
2024	South Sydney Rabbitohs	2024 NSW Cup season	11	3	0	0	12	
2025	Villefranche XIII Aveyron	Super XIII 2024–2025	4	3	0	0	12	
2025	London Broncos	2025 RFL Championship	8	3	0	0	12	
2026	London Broncos	2026 RFL Championship	22	23	2	0	96	
Club career total			64	39	2	0	160	
