= 2026 London Broncos season =

47th London Broncos season

- 2026 RFL Championship Rank: 1st
- Play-off result: Grand Final Winners
- Challenge Cup: 3rd Round
- RFL 1895 Cup: Winners
- 2026 record: Wins: 32; draws: 0; losses: 2
- Points scored: For: 2,043; against: 406

Team information
- Chairman: Gary Hetherington
- Head Coach: Jason Demetriou
- Captain: Reagan Campbell-Gillard
- Stadium: Plough Lane
- Avg. attendance: 3,396
- High attendance: 4,380

Top scorers
- Tries: Neil Tchamambe – 40
- Goals: Jimmy Meadows – 150
- Points: Jimmy Meadows – 340
Home colours	Away colours
← 2025	List of seasons	2027 →

The 2026 London Broncos season is the 47th year in the club's history and their first season under the ownership group of Darren Lockyer, Grant Wechsel and Gary Hetherington. It is their fifth season at Plough Lane as tenants of AFC Wimbledon. They are coached by new Head Coach Jason Demetriou who is assisted by the returning Danny Ward. The Broncos will compete in the 2026 RFL Championship, 2026 Challenge Cup and 2026 RFL 1895 Cup.

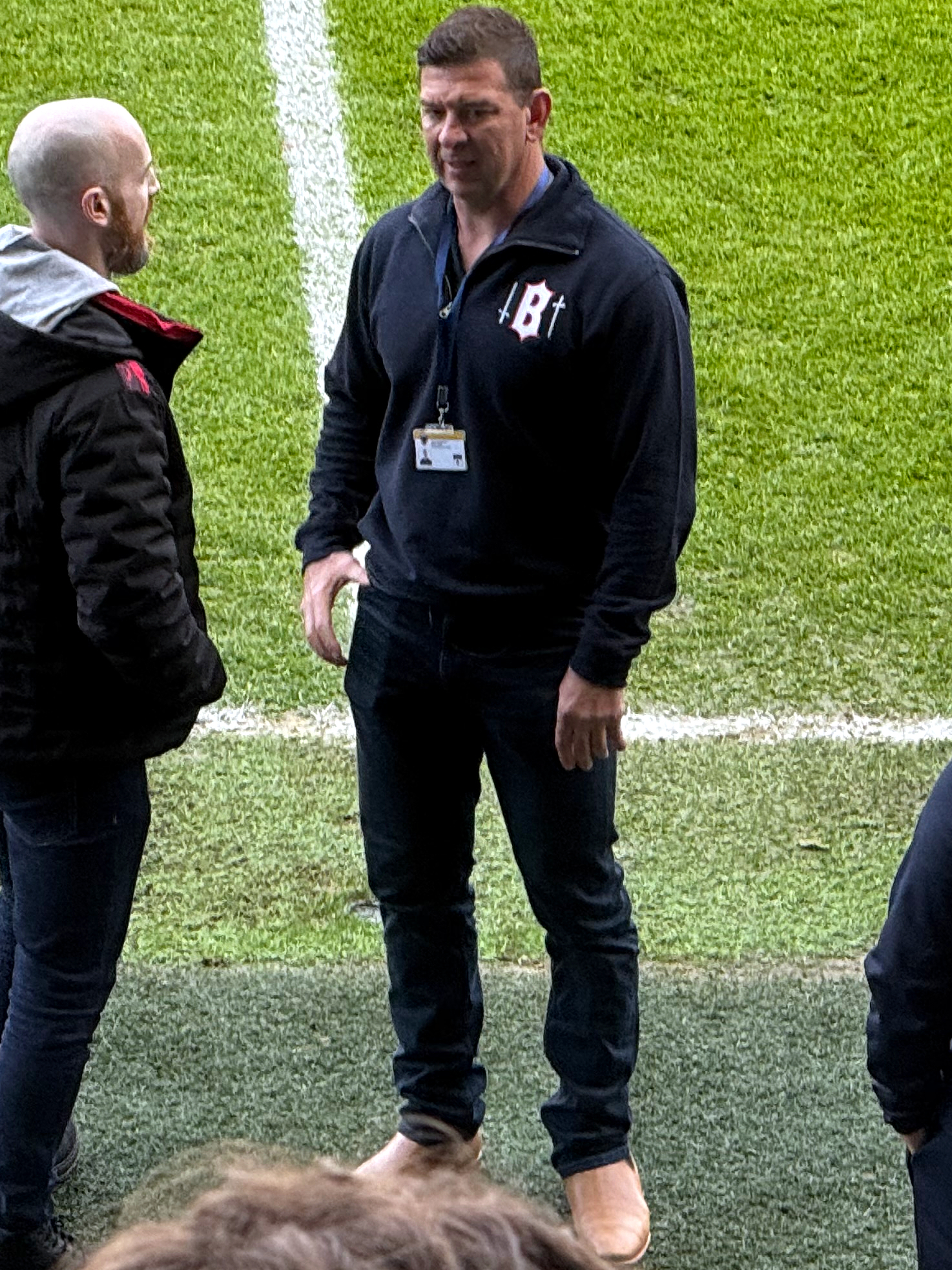
Coach Demetriou in conversation in January 2026

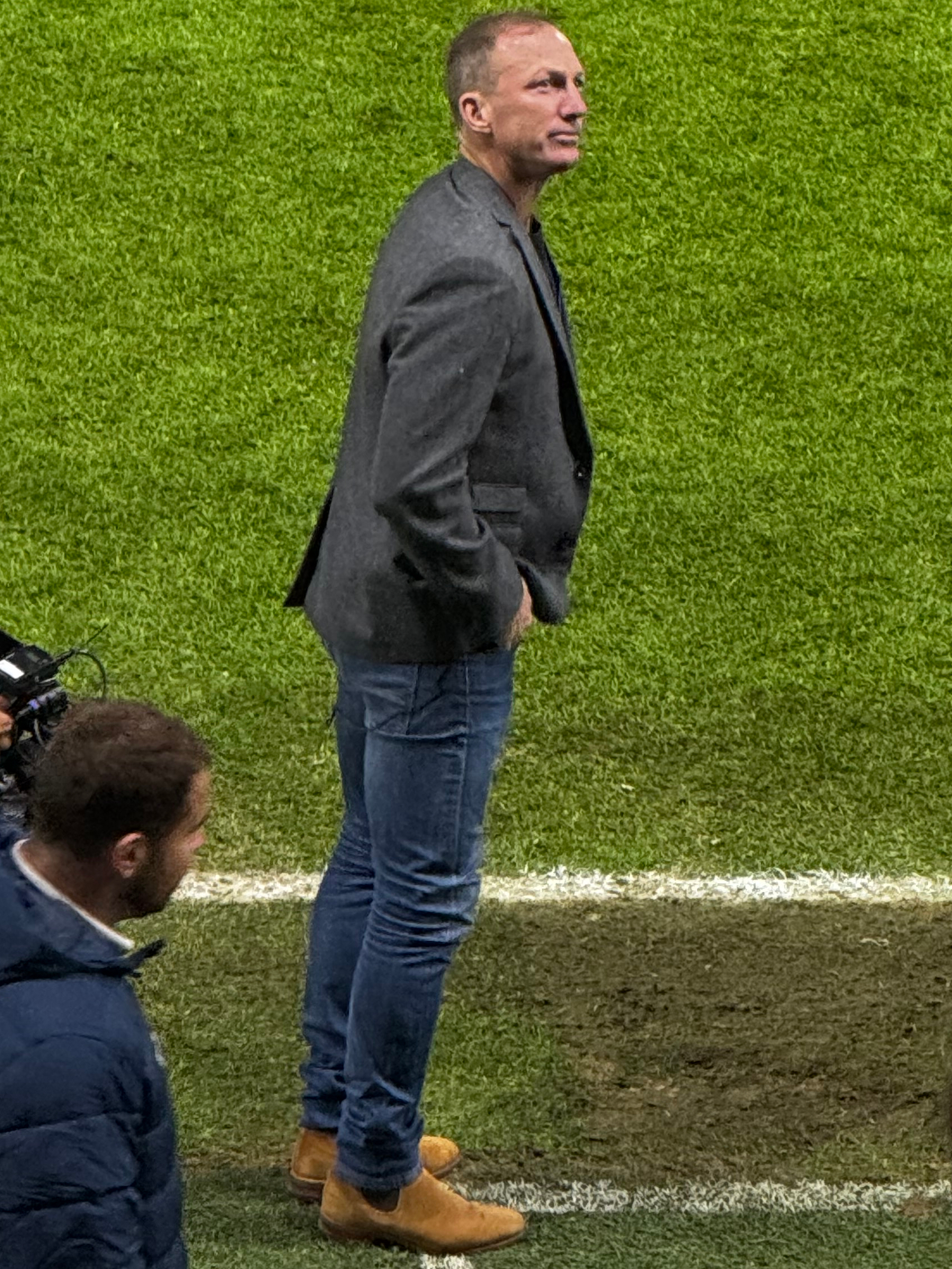
Darren Lockyer pitchside at London in January 2026

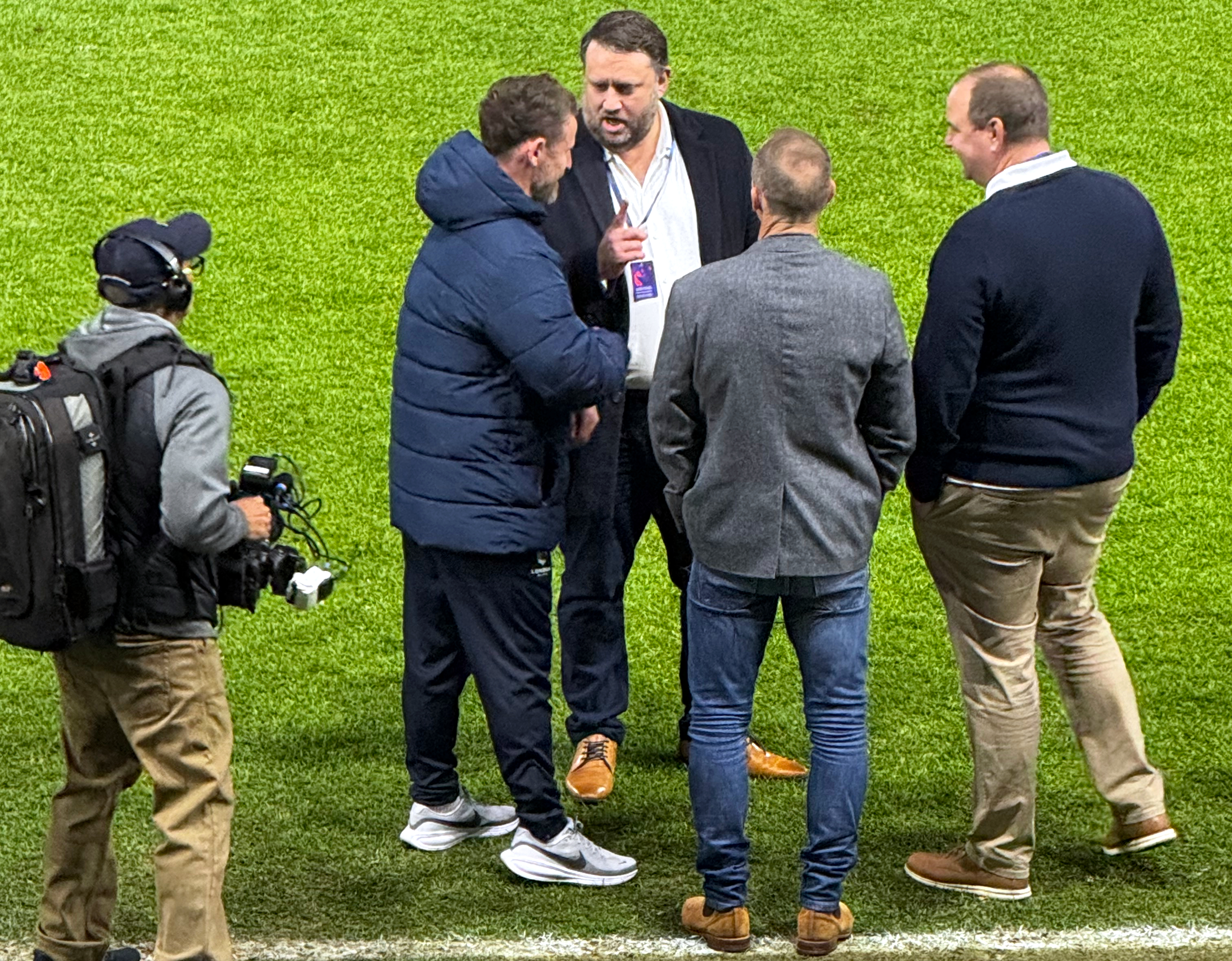
Mike Eccles, Grant Wechsel and Darren Lockyer on the pitch post-match in 2026

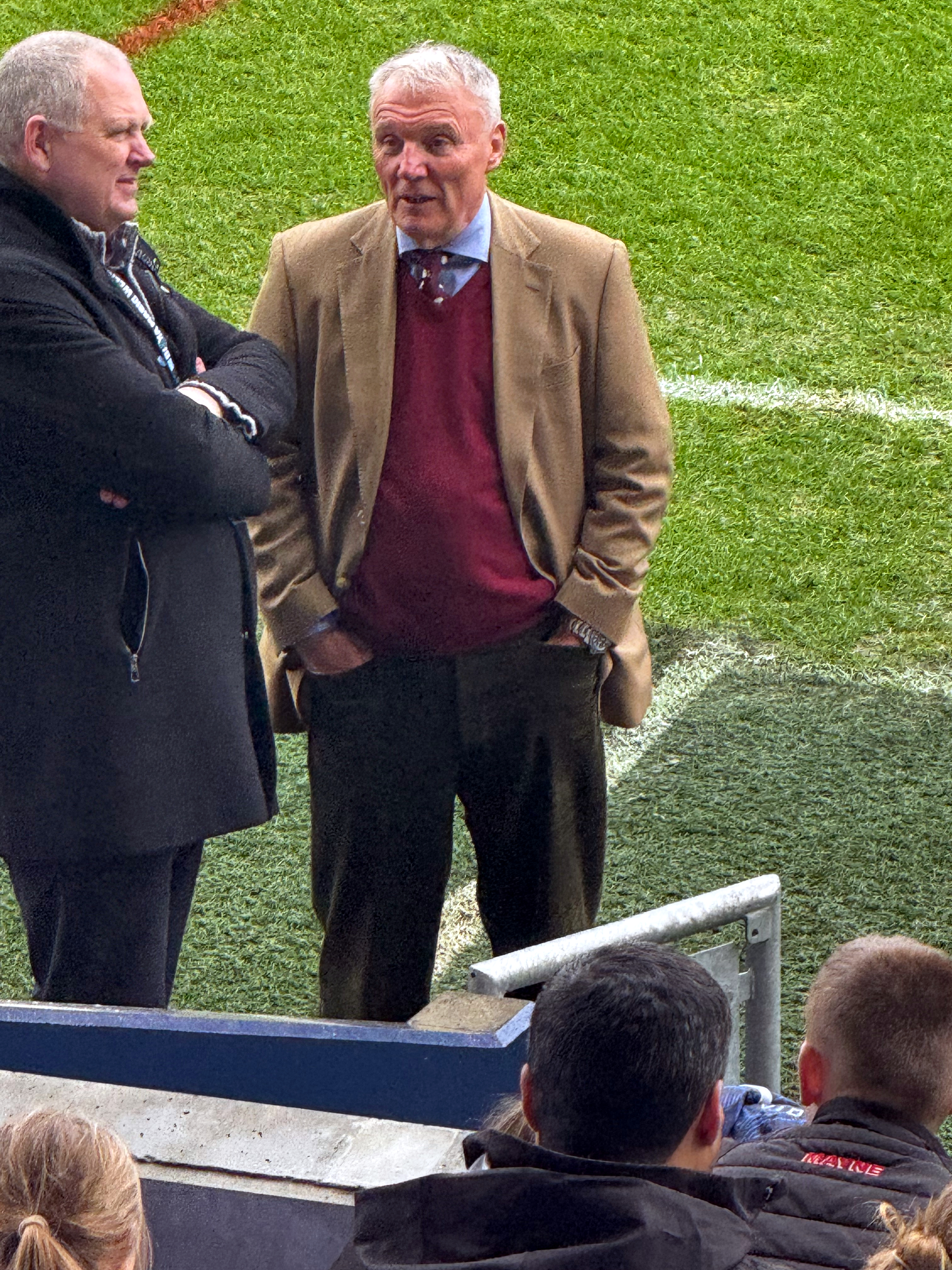
Gary Hetherington pitchside pre-game against Oldham in February 2026

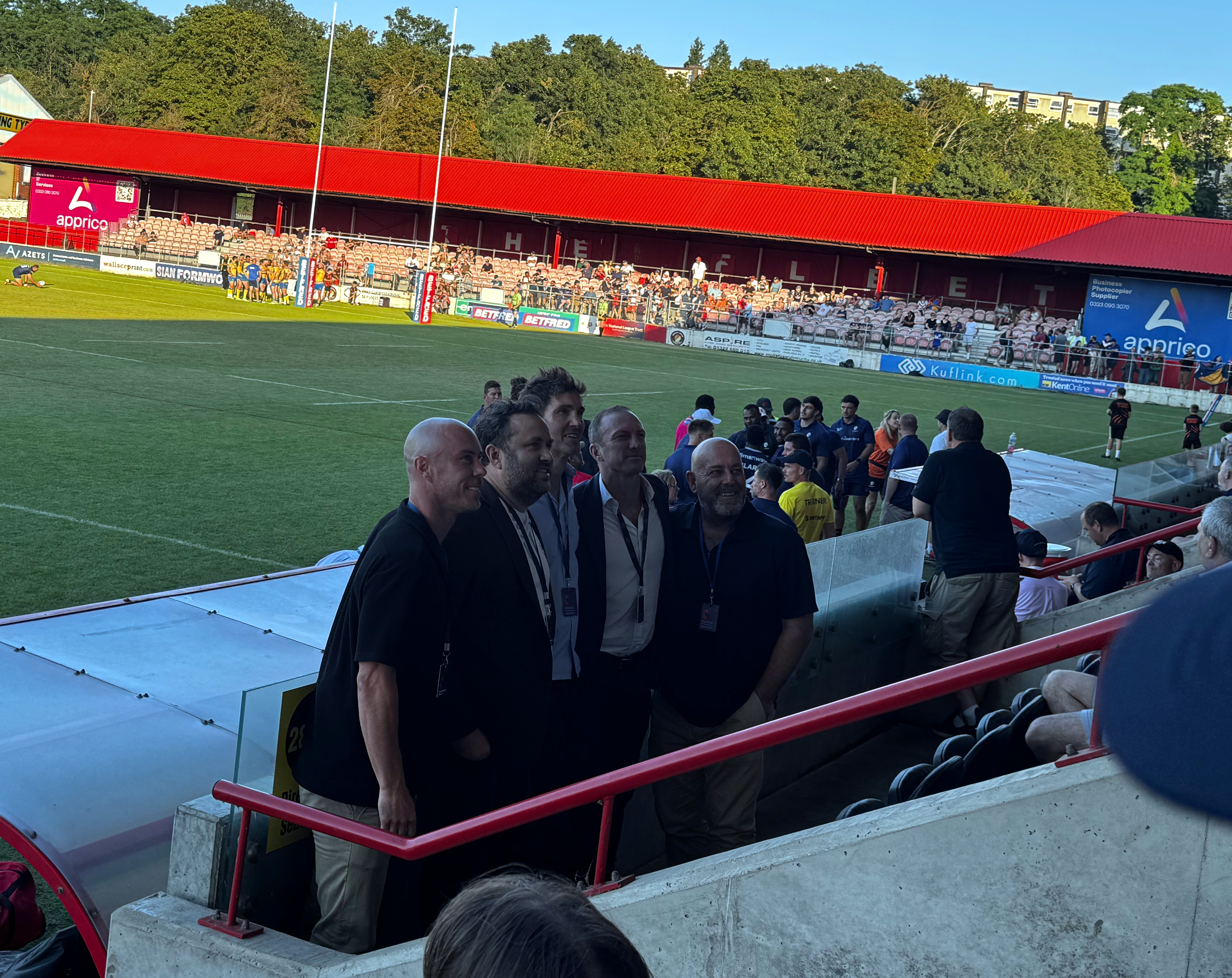
Chris Lynn, Grant Wechsel, Andrew Gray, Darren Lockyer and Darren Lehmann in July 2026

== Ownership ==
In September 2025, following the conclusion of London's 2025 RFL Championship season, Darren Lockyer led an ownership group consisting of businessman Grant Wechsel, and Super League executive Gary Hetherington in the successful takeover of the London Broncos.

Lockyer and his business partner Grant Wechsel have a 90% stake, with Gary Hetherington retaining a minority share in the club in the capital.

In May 2026 prominent Brisbane property developer Andrew Gray was added to the ownership group, after purchasing an undisclosed minority stake in the London club. Andrew alongside his brother Rob Gray, run Graya a luxury design and construction firm who regularly sell properties for over $20 million and have over $1 billion in ongoing projects in Australia.

In Summer 2026 David Dixon, the founder and CEO of Playerworks joined the ownership group. His company represents Premier League and international footballers.

== Super League bid ==
In October 2025, with Toulouse Olympique and the York Knights selected for promotion, the London club were controversially overlooked for elevation to the Super League in favour of the Bradford Bulls.

Following the decision, the club's ownership group confirmed their commitment to the long-term vision, emphasising that they will compete in the Championship for the 2026 season with the goal of securing a Super League place in the future.

== Coaches ==
Mike Eccles relinquished his lead coach role at the end of the 2025 season after Jason Demetriou was confirmed as the new head coach of the London Broncos from the 2026 season.

This was confirmed after the Darren Lockyer led takeover of the London side was ratified in September 2025. Eccles became the Director of Rugby & Performance at the Broncos.

In September 2025 Jason Demetriou was confirmed as the new head coach of the London Broncos from 2026 onwards. This was confirmed was confirmed to be a three-year deal after the Darren Lockyer-led takeover of the London side was ratified in September 2025.

In October 2025 Danny Ward returned to the club as assistant coach, taking the role after winning the Super League with Hull Kingston Rovers. He returned to the club where he was the head coach for four years, assistant for three years and under 19s coach for two years, as well as spending four years as a player in the capital.

== Re-branding and Reebok partnership ==
In October 2025 the Broncos signed a multi-year deal with the global sports brand Reebok as first team kit manufacturer as well as official supplier of teamwear and merchandise.

The re-branding also involved a change in logo, as well as a move away from the black with a white chevron kits that had been the mainstay of the club for over a decade.

The 2026 home kit shifted away from traditional London colours and moved to navy blue. This move however did have connection to the away kits of the 2003, 2004 and 2005 seasons, as well as a colour connection to the away kits of the 1999, 2000, 2001 and 2002 seasons. It also had a link to AFC Wimbledon with shades of blue being the traditional colours of Wimbledon F.C. as well as both clubs having all-white away kits. Another link was the Union Jack or the Union Flag; with blue, red and white being the clubs colours on the field and their branding identity away from it.

== Training ground ==
In November 2025 the London Broncos moved to a new training base, taking over the former London Irish rugby union club facility in Sunbury-on-Thames in Surrey. The Hazelwood complex will serve as the Broncos' new training ground and also their administrative base. The Broncos are the primary tenants at the site, but the London Irish Amateur side will still continue play their Regional 2 Thames level six games there.

The Broncos' new administrative headquarters has four full size grass pitches, one full size 4G pitch, medical support centre, gym and a large clubhouse with an on-site chef and a licensed bar open to the public seven days a week.

== Captaincy ==
In January 2026 Wally Lewis presided over a ceremony in which Reagan Campbell-Gillard was named as captain of the London Broncos for the 2026 RFL Championship season, taking over from long-term captain Will Lovell.

== Reserves ==
In late 2025, the Broncos' hierarchy announced their intention to run a Reserves side alongside the first team. In January 2026 it was confirmed that the London Broncos would feature in the 2026 Super League Reserve competition, with home games played at the clubs Hazelwood facility.

== Documentary series ==
Every aspect of the London Broncos season is being filmed for a planned documentary series. Both Darren Lockyer and Grant Wechsel have confirmed that it is being filmed, but have remained coy on where it is due to be broadcast.

== Television deal ==
In March 2026 the National Broadcasting Corporation of Papua New Guinea announced that it has secured the exclusive broadcast rights for all of the remaining London Broncos home matches for the 2026 season. PNG NBC will broadcast these home games across PNG and selected Pacific Island markets. In Papua New Guinea, NBC will feature all the matches LIVE on NBC Channel 1 along with a simulcast on NBC Radio.

== Pre-season friendly ==
Pre-season friendly
Home	Score	Away	Match Information
Home	Score	Away	Date	Time	Venue	Tries	Goals	Referee	Attendance
Keighley Cougars	C-C	London Broncos	Sunday 11 January 2026	15:00	Cougar Park	Cancelled due to freezing conditions

== Betfred Championship ==
=== Fixtures ===
Betfred Championship
Round	Home	Score	Home	Match Information
Round	Home	Score	Home	Date	Time	Venue	Tries	Goals	Referee	Attendance
1	London Broncos	44–12	Widnes Vikings	Sunday 18 January	15:00	Plough Lane	Hawkins, Max 2, Mathias, Campbell-Gillard, Bienek, Wallis, Meadows	Croft 6	Tara Jones	4,380
2	London Broncos	25–8	Oldham	Sunday 1 February	15:00	Plough Lane	Max, Campbell-Gillard, Mathias, Tindall, Glare	Voro, Croft, Hawkins (DG)	M. Lynn	2,330
3	Featherstone Rovers	C–C	London Broncos	Sunday 15 February	15:00	The Millennium Stadium
4	Swinton Lions	6–84	London Broncos	Sunday 22 February	15:00	Heywood Road	Meadows, Tindall 2, Morea 4, Glare 2, Smith, Tchamambe, Webster-Mansfield 2, Kapinias, Stock	Meadows 12	S. Mikalauskas	662
5	London Broncos	106-18	North Wales Crusaders	Saturday 28 February	19:30	Plough Lane	Kapinias, Meadows 2, Croft, Voro 2, Tchamambe 2, Morea 3, Glare 2, Bitungane, Hursey-Hord, Smith, Tindall, Adebiyi	Meadows 17	Tara Jones
6	Halifax Panthers	4-42	London Broncos	Sunday 8 March	15:00	The Shay	Croft, Tindall, Glare 2, Voro, Morea, Webster-Mansfield, Kapinias	Meadows 2, Croft, Voro 2	S. Mikalauskas	2,066
7	London Broncos	66-6	Salford	Sunday 22 March	15:00	Plough Lane	Wallis, Tindall, Tchamambe 2, O'Beirne 2, Bienek, Kapinias 3, Alex Walker, Smith	Meadows 9	K. Moore
8	London Broncos	40-12	Batley Bulldogs	Sunday 29 March	15:00	Plough Lane	Tindall 2, Smith 2, Meadows 2, Tchamambe, Stock	Meadows 4	R. Cox
9	Bye
10	London Broncos	48-4	Sheffield Eagles	Saturday 11 April	18:00	Plough Lane	Hawkins, Morea 2, Tindall, Kapinias 2, Webster-Mansfield, Voro	Meadows 6, Morea, Voro	D. Arnold
11	Doncaster	16-30	London Broncos	Sunday 26 April	15:00	Eco-Power Stadium	Hawkins 2, Campbell-Gillard, Morea, Smith	Hawkins 5	L. Rush	1,546
12	Goole Vikings	10-70	London Broncos	Saturday 2 May	15:00	Victoria Pleasure Grounds	Bitungane, Campbell-Gillard, Hursey-Hord, Voro, Smith 2, Tchamambe 2, Morea 2, Tindall, Havili	Hawkins 11	A. Belafonte
13	London Broncos	64-0	Midlands Hurricanes	Sunday 10 May	15:00	Plough Lane	Voro 4, Tindall, Morea 4, Adebiyi, Hawkins	Hawkins 7, Meadows	A. Belafonte
14	Sheffield Eagles	10-72	London Broncos	Sunday 24 May	15:00	Steel City Stadium	Smith 2, Wallis 2, Webster-Mansfield 3, Morea 2, Glare 2, O'Beirne, Tchamambe	Meadows 10	S. Mikalauskas	707
3*	Hunslet	18-54	London Broncos	Sunday 31 May	15:00	South Leeds Stadium	Smith, Tchamambe 3, Adebiyi, Bitungane, Morea 2, Hursey-Hord	Meadows 9	D. Arnold	951
15	North Wales Crusaders	0-134	London Broncos	Sunday 7 June	15:00	Eirias Stadium	Bitungane, Morea 4, Tchamambe 4, Hawkins, Glare, Webster-Mansfield 5, Hursey-Hord, Davidson, Smith 2, Voro 2, O'Beirne, Adebiyi, Meadows	Voro 10, Meadows 7	F. Lincoln
16	Bye
17	London Broncos	C–C	Featherstone Rovers	Sunday 21 June	15:00	Twickenham Stoop
18	Batley Bulldogs	12-64	London Broncos	Sunday 28 June	15:00	The Fox's Biscuits Stadium	Tchamambe 2, Davidson, Havili, Alex Walker, Bienek, Glare, Smith, O'Beirne, Wallis, Bitungane	Meadows 9, Voro	S. Mikalauskas
17*	London Broncos	78-16	Hunslet	Saturday 4 July	15:00	Kuflink Stadium	Walker 3, Lovell, Havili, Voro 7, Wallis, Tchamambe, Smith	Voro 8, Webster-Mansfield	A. Williams
19	London Broncos	68-18	Doncaster	Saturday 11 July	18:00	Kuflink Stadium	Tchamambe, Glare 2, Hursey-Hord, O'Beirne, Webster-Mansfield, Voro 2, Campbell-Gillard, Smith 2, Bienek	Meadows 9, Webster-Mansfield	D. Arnold
20	Salford	4-62	London Broncos	Sunday 19 July	15:00	CorpAcq Stadium	Smith 3, Mathias 4, Glare 2, Stock, Croft	Meadows 9	R. Cox
21	Midlands Hurricanes	16-78	London Broncos	Sunday 26 July	14:00	Avery Fields	Croft, Wallis, Webster-Mansfield 2, Tchamambe 2, Voro 3, Hursey-Hord, Hawkins, Havili, Campbell-Gillard, Max	Meadows 11	F. Lincoln	489
22	Widnes Vikings	36-42	London Broncos	Sunday 2 August	15:00	DCBL Stadium	Wallis 2, Max 2, Voro, Smith, Tchamambe 2	Voro 5	M. Lynn	2,011
23	London Broncos	92-6	Goole Vikings	Sunday 9 August	15:00	Plough Lane	Walker 4, Max 2, Davidson 2, Bienek 2, Voro 2, Mathias 2, Hursey-Hord, Davis, Bitungane	Voro 7, Hawkins 4, Walker	F. Lincoln
24	Oldham	34-24	London Broncos	Sunday 16 August	15:00	Boundary Park	Bienek, Tchamambe, Wallis, Hursey-Hord	Hawkins 4	M. Lynn	1,345
25	London Broncos	58-12	Halifax Panthers	Sunday 23 August	15:00	Plough Lane	Mathias 3, Tchamambe 3, Voro 2, Walker, Stock, Havili	Voro 7	C. Hughes
26	London Broncos	66-18	Swinton Lions	Saturday 5 September	14:00	Athletic Ground, Richmond	Tindall 2, Adebiyi, Lenthall 2, Davis, Max 3, Stock 2, Porter	Davidson 9	A. Williams	2000+

=== Table ===
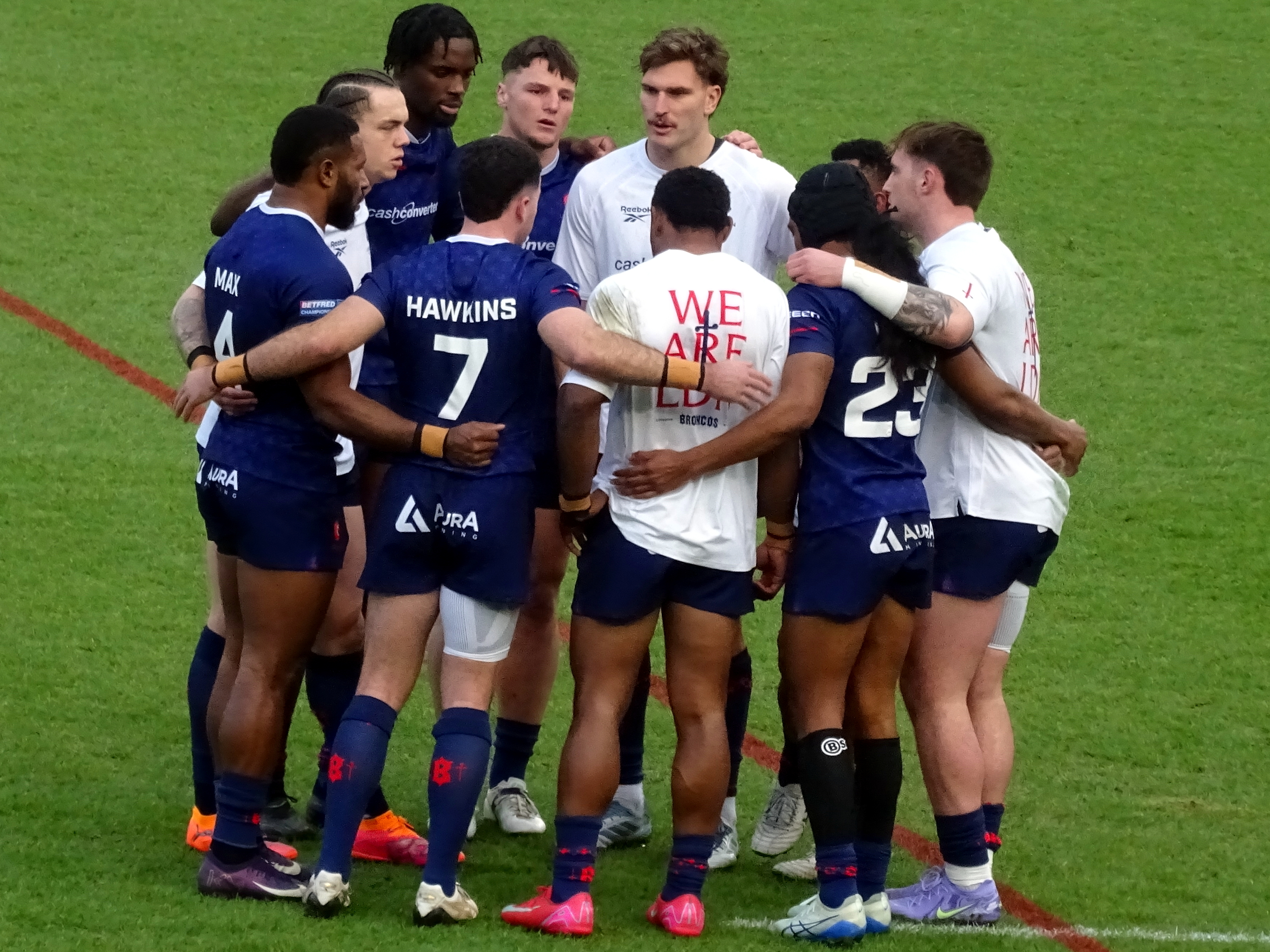
Backs and second-rows pre-match huddle, January 2026

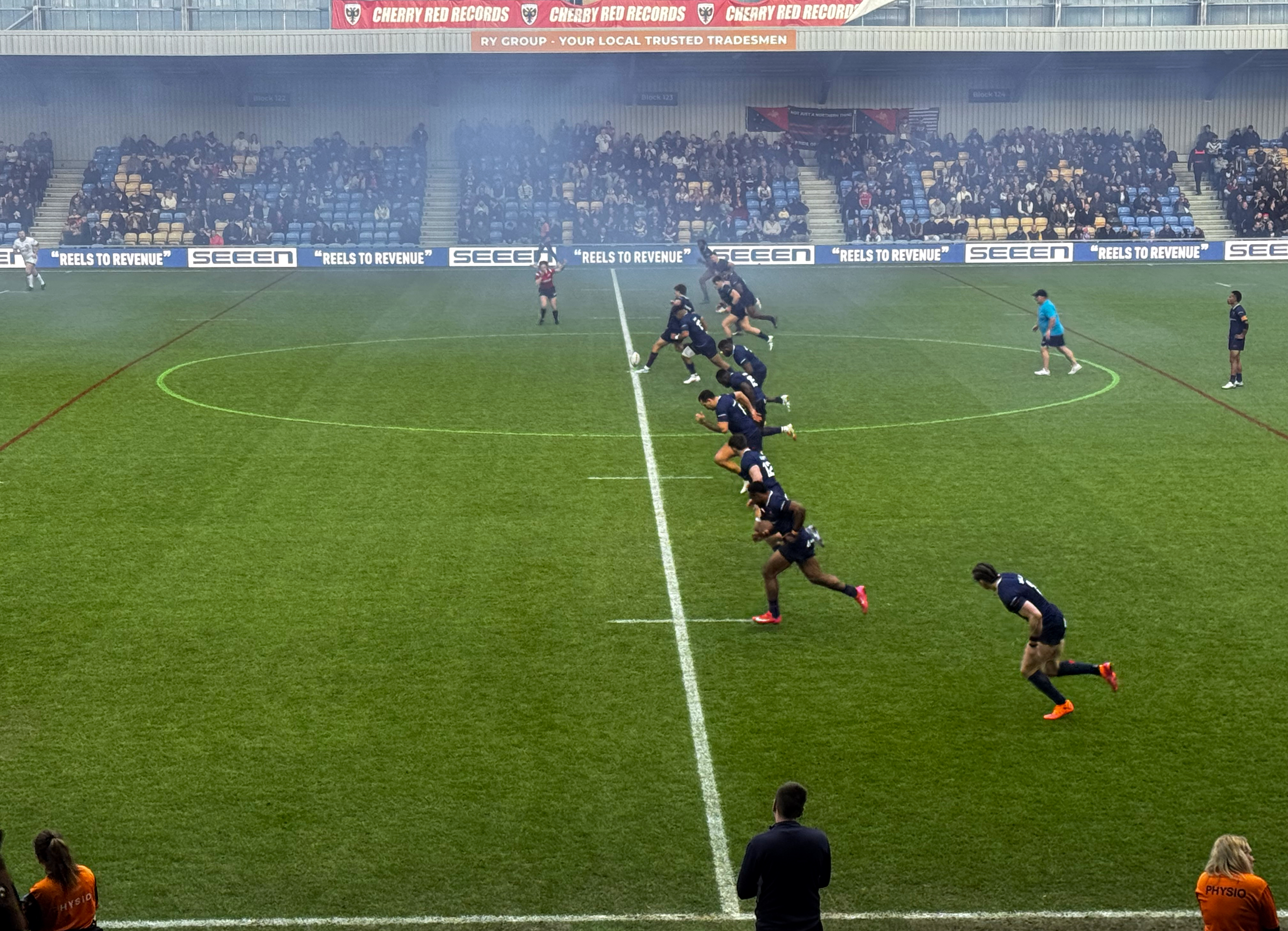
London Broncos kicking off the season against the Widnes Vikings in January 2026

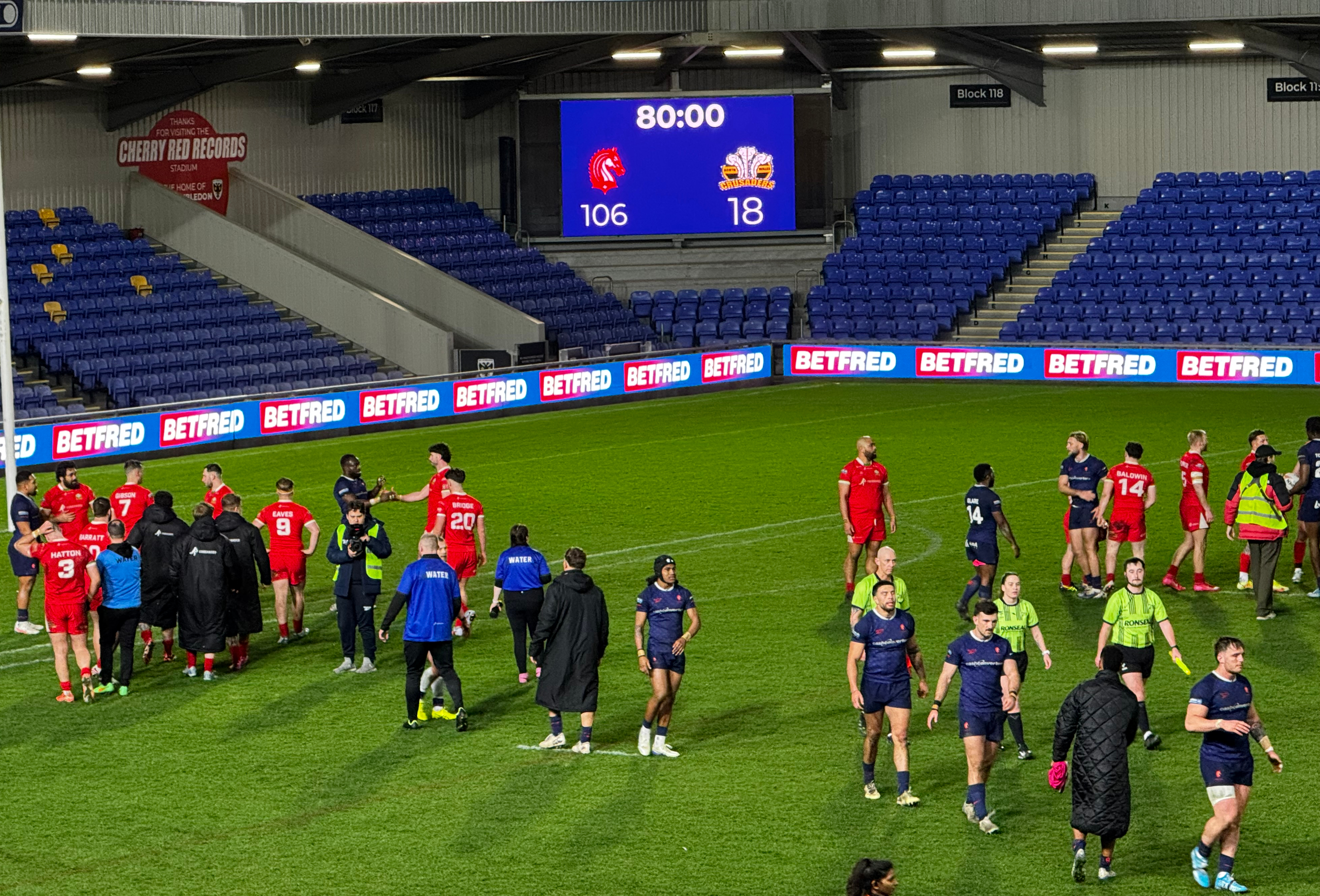
The London Broncos post match against the North Wales Crusaders in February 2026 after scoring the most points and securing the widest margin of victory in their history

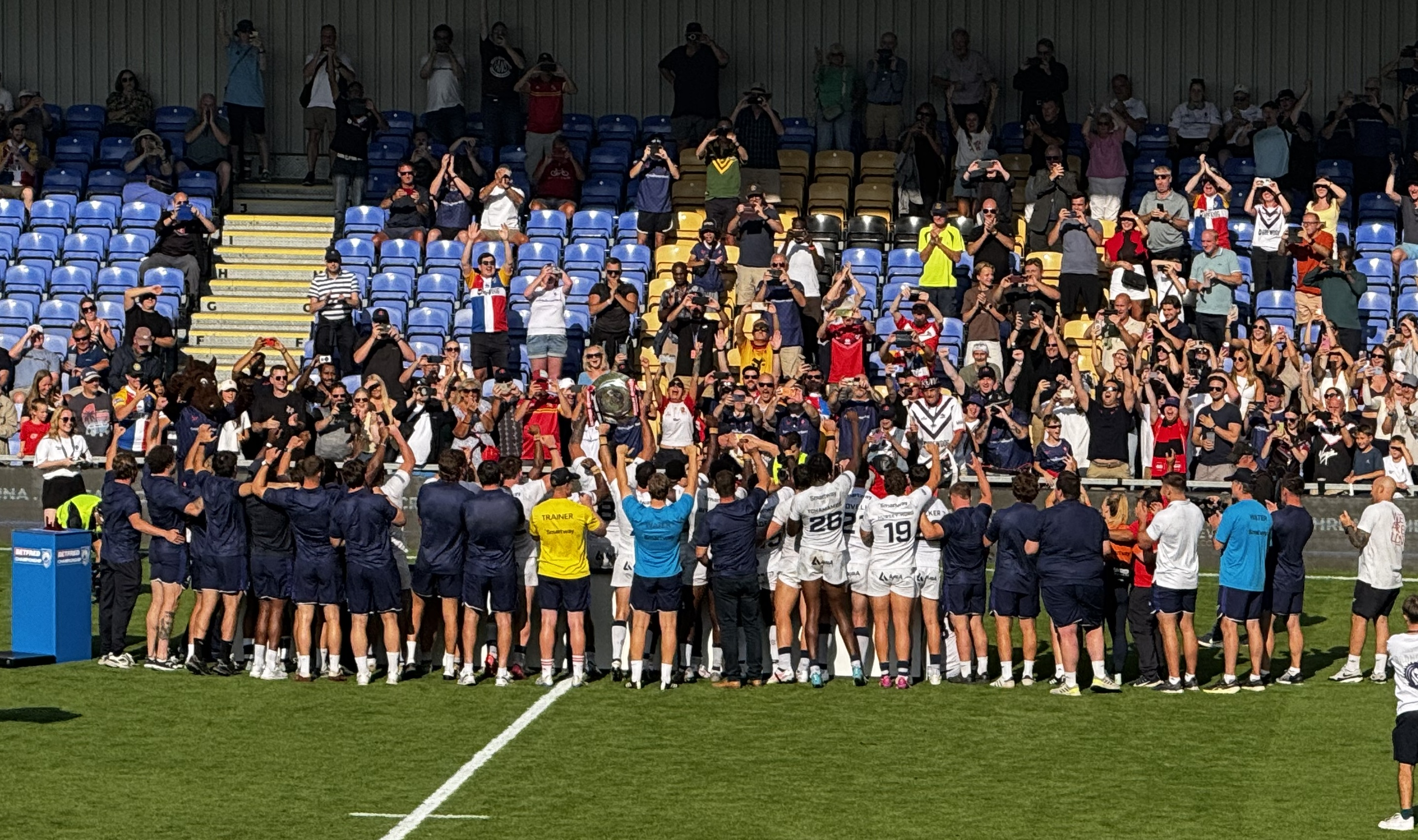
The League Leaders Shield being lifted in August 2026

Pos	Team	Pld	W	D	L	PF	PA	PD	Pts	Qualification
1	London Broncos	24	23	0	1	1511	296	+1215	46	League Leaders Shield and qualify for Qualifying Finals
2	Newcastle Thunder	24	21	0	3	1093	302	+791	42	Qualifying Finals
3	Oldham	24	21	0	3	787	403	+384	42	Qualifying Semi-Finals
4	Doncaster	24	19	0	5	915	379	+536	38	Qualifying Semi-Finals
5	Widnes Vikings	24	17	0	7	757	356	+401	34	Qualifying Semi-Finals
6	Barrow Raiders	24	17	0	7	649	447	+202	34	Qualifying Semi-Finals
7	Sheffield Eagles	24	16	0	8	637	545	+92	32	Eliminators
8	Midlands Hurricanes	24	13	1	10	652	650	+2	27	Eliminators
9	Whitehaven	24	11	1	12	519	661	−142	23	Eliminators
10	Batley Bulldogs	24	11	0	13	657	573	+84	22	Eliminators
11	Dewsbury Rams	24	8	0	16	522	652	−130	16	
12	Salford	24	8	0	16	544	796	−252	16	
13	Hunslet	24	8	0	16	496	776	−280	16	
14	Goole Vikings	24	8	0	16	532	867	−335	16	
15	Rochdale Hornets	24	8	0	16	403	754	−351	16	
16	Keighley Cougars	24	6	2	16	594	678	−84	14	
17	Swinton Lions	24	6	1	17	488	794	−306	13	
18	Workington Town	24	5	1	18	472	735	−263	11	
19	Halifax Panthers	24	8	0	16	558	668	−110	4 (Note: A 12-point deduction was applied upon re-instatement to the league)	
20	North Wales Crusaders	24	3	0	21	282	1736	−1454	−6 (Note: A 12-point deduction was imposed for insolvency and change of ownership mid-season)	

Source: RFL

== Play-offs ==
=== Team bracket ===
Qualifying Semi-Finals and Eliminators
QSF1
3	Oldham	24
5	Widnes Vikings	30
QSF2
4	Doncaster	72
6	Barrow Raiders	0
E1
7	Sheffield Eagles	25
10	Batley Bulldogs	18
E2
8	Midlands Hurricanes	36
9	Whitehaven	4

Qualifying and Elimination Finals
QF1
1	London Broncos	42
4	Doncaster	6
QF2
2	Newcastle Thunder	34
5	Widnes Vikings	16
EF1
3	Oldham	46
8	Midlands Hurricanes	16
EF2
6	Barrow Raiders	26
7	Sheffield Eagles	10

Sudden Death Play-Offs
SD1
4	Doncaster
6	Barrow Raiders
SD2
5	Widnes Vikings
3	Oldham

Preliminary Finals
PF1
2	Newcastle Thunder	18
4	Doncaster	33
PF2
1	London Broncos	74
5	Oldham	8

Grand Final
1	London Broncos	78
4	Doncaster	6

2026 Championship Play-Offs
Round	Home	Score	Away	Match Information
Round	Home	Score	Away	Date	Time	Venue	Tries	Goals	Referee	Attendance
QF1	London Broncos	42-6	Doncaster	Sunday 14 September 2026	15:00	Plough Lane	Tchamambe 2, Voro 2, O'Beirne, Mathias, Smith, Kapinias	Hawkins 5	J. Vella
PF1	London Broncos	74–8	Oldham	Sunday 27 September 2026	15:00	Plough Lane	Meadows, Webster-Mansfield, Mathias 2, Wallis 2, Smith, Campbell-Gillard, Hawkins, Voro, Tchamambe 2, Bitungane 2	Meadows 7, Voro 2	T. Jones
GF	London Broncos	78-6	Doncaster	Sunday 4 October 2026	15:00	Plough Lane	Meadows 2, Hawkins, Tchamambe 2, Mathias, Wallis 2, Havili, Webster-Mansfield 2, O'Beirne, Voro, Bitungane	Meadows 6, Voro 4, Smith	L. Rush

== Challenge Cup ==
2026 Challenge Cup
Round	Home	Score	Away	Match Information
Round	Home	Score	Away	Date	Time	Venue	Tries	Goals	Referee	Attendance
2	London Broncos	86–0	Wests Warriors	Sunday 25 January 2026	14:00	Athletic Ground, Richmond	Max 4, Tindall 3, Wallis, Voro 2, Hursey-Hord, Morea 2, Stock, Mathias, Kapinias	Meadows 7, Voro 2, O'Beirne 2	Aaryn Belafonte
3	London Broncos	8–26	Bradford Bulls	Sunday 8 February 2026	15:00	Cherry Red Records Stadium	Glare, Tindall		M. Griffiths	3,477

== 1895 Cup ==
2026 RFL 1895 Cup
Round	Home	Score	Away	Match Information
Round	Home	Score	Away	Date	Time	Venue	Tries	Goals	Referee	Attendance
Preliminary	London Broncos	36-10	Barrow Raiders	Sunday 15 March 2026	15:00	Athletic Ground, Richmond	Kapinias, Tindall, Wallis, Webster-Mansfield, Stock, Bienek	Voro 6	Aaryn Belafonte
1	London Broncos	62-6	Keighley Cougars	Sunday 19 April 2026	15:00	Athletic Ground, Richmond	Mathias, Voro, O'Beirne, Morea, Wallis, Stock, Max, Tchamambe	Hawkins 9	A. Williams
Quarter Final	London Broncos	52-20	Doncaster	Sunday 17 May 2026	15:00	Athletic Ground, Richmond	Smith 2, Tchamambe 3, Morea, Hursey-Hord, Voro 2, Adebiyi	Meadows 6	Aaryn Belafonte
Semi Final	Midlands Hurricanes	24-62	London Broncos	Saturday 13 June 2026	14:00	Avery Fields	Webster-Mansfield 4, Glare 2, Voro, Havili, Alex Walker, O'Beirne, Hursey-Hord	Meadows 9	M. Lynn	519
Final	London Broncos	32-10	Widnes Vikings	Monday 31 August 2026	15:00	Halliwell Jones Stadium	Tchamambe 2, Hawkins, Smith, Alex Walker, Mathias	Hawkins 4	T. Grant	4,829

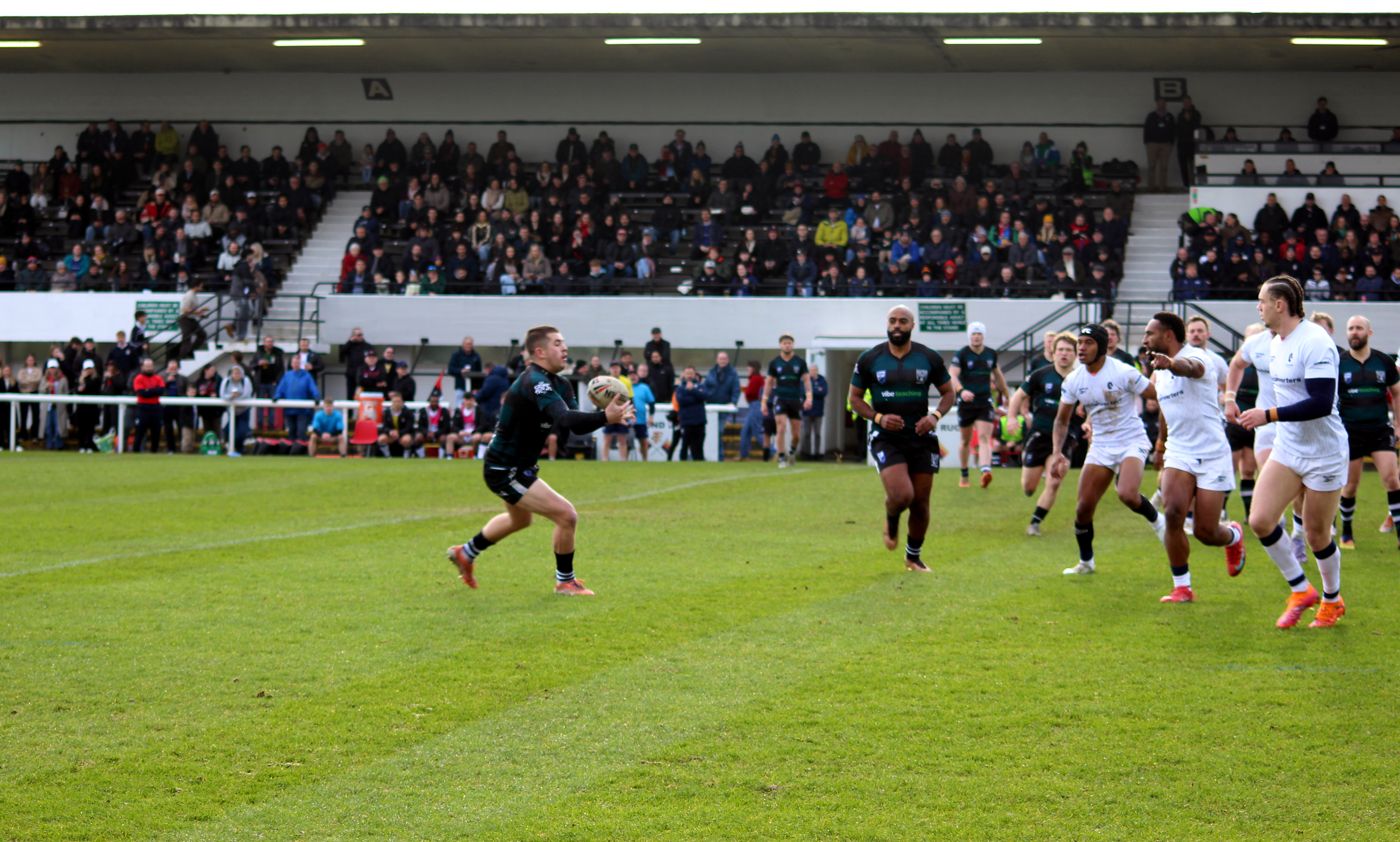
The Wests Warriors with ball against the Broncos in the Second Round of the Challenge Cup at the Athletic Ground, Richmond in 2026

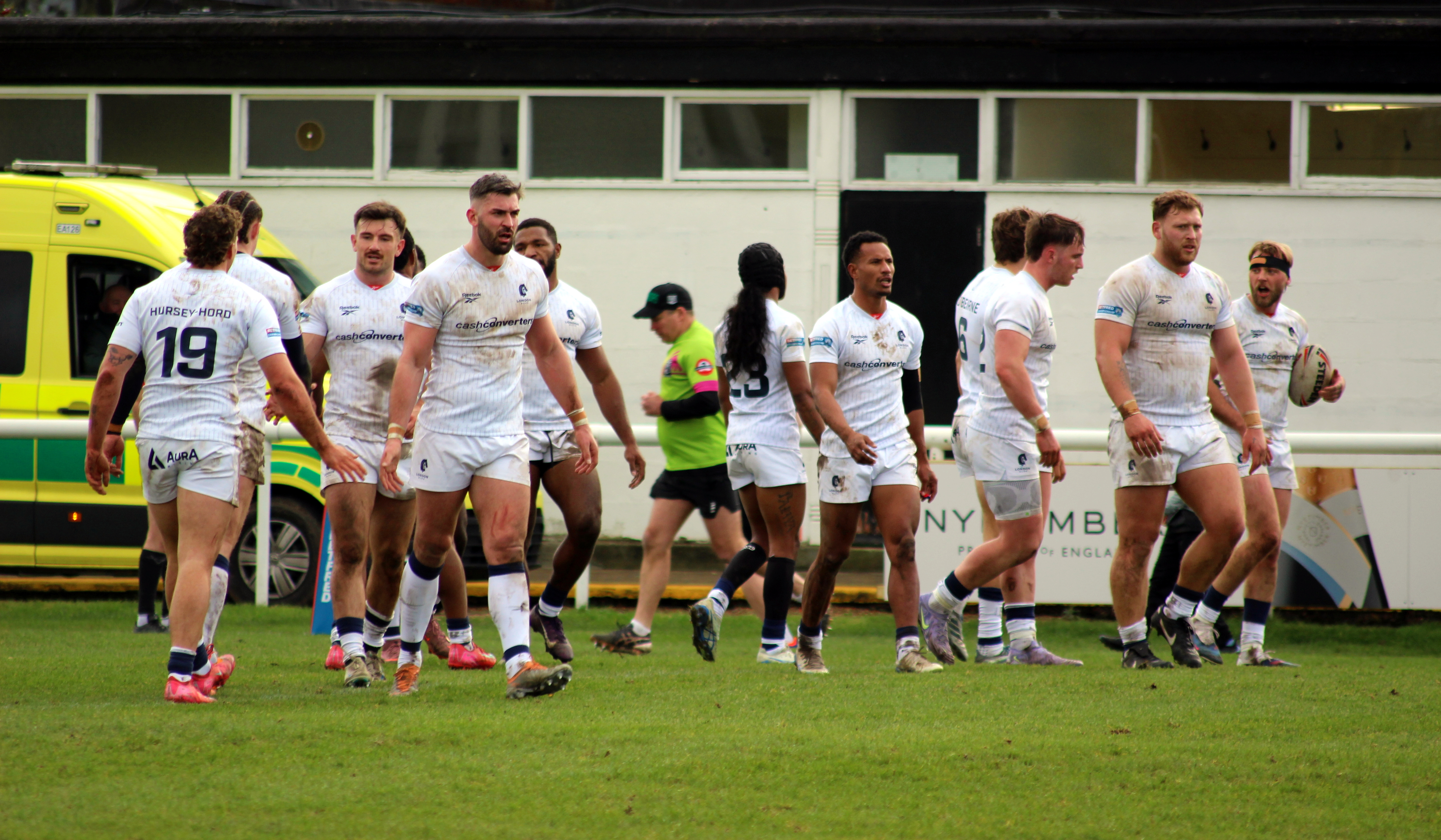
London celebrate a try against the Wests Warriors in the 2nd Round of the 2026 Challenge Cup at the Athletic Ground, Richmond

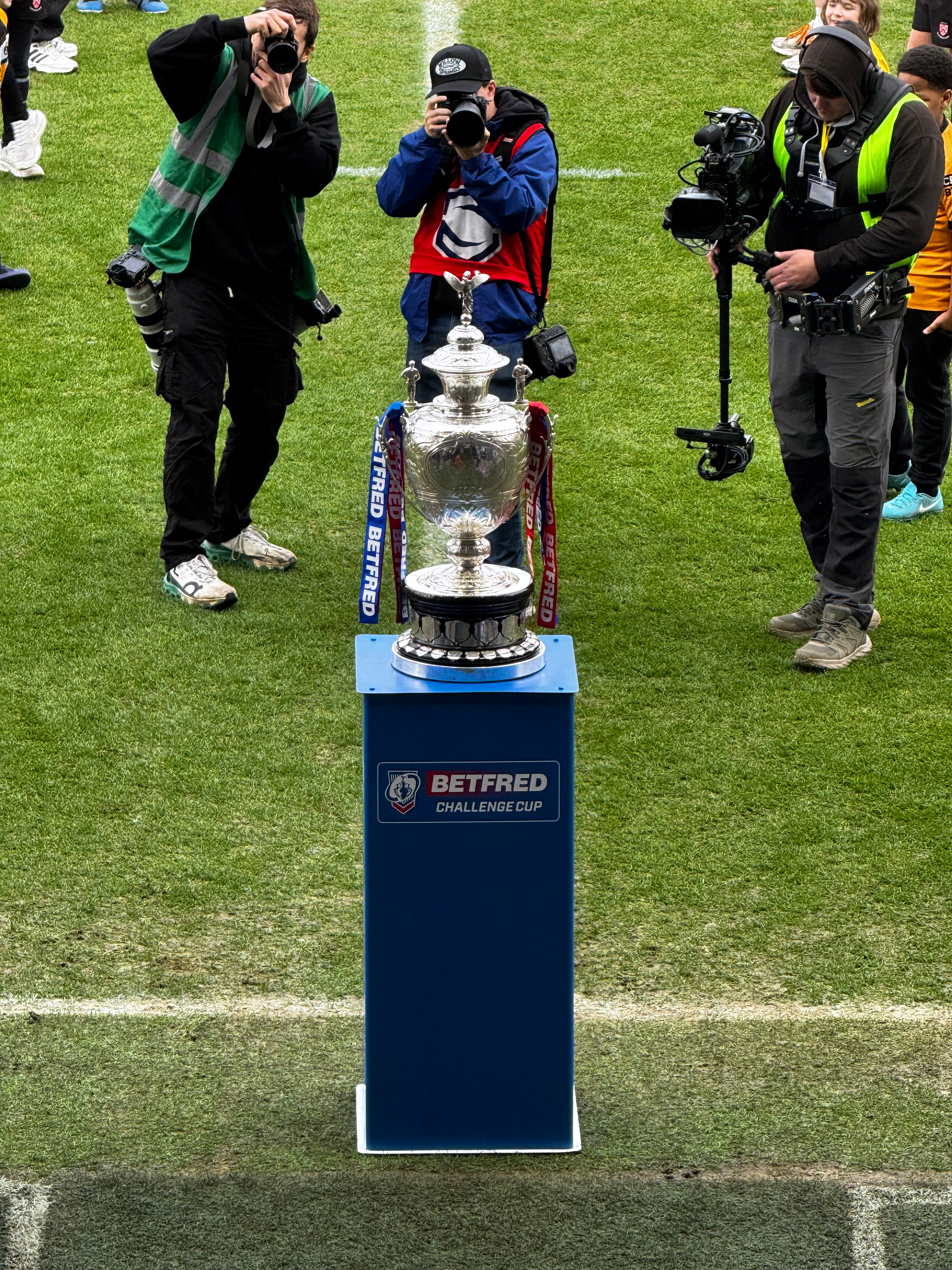
The Challenge Cup trophy pitchside pre-game against the Bradford Bulls in February 2026

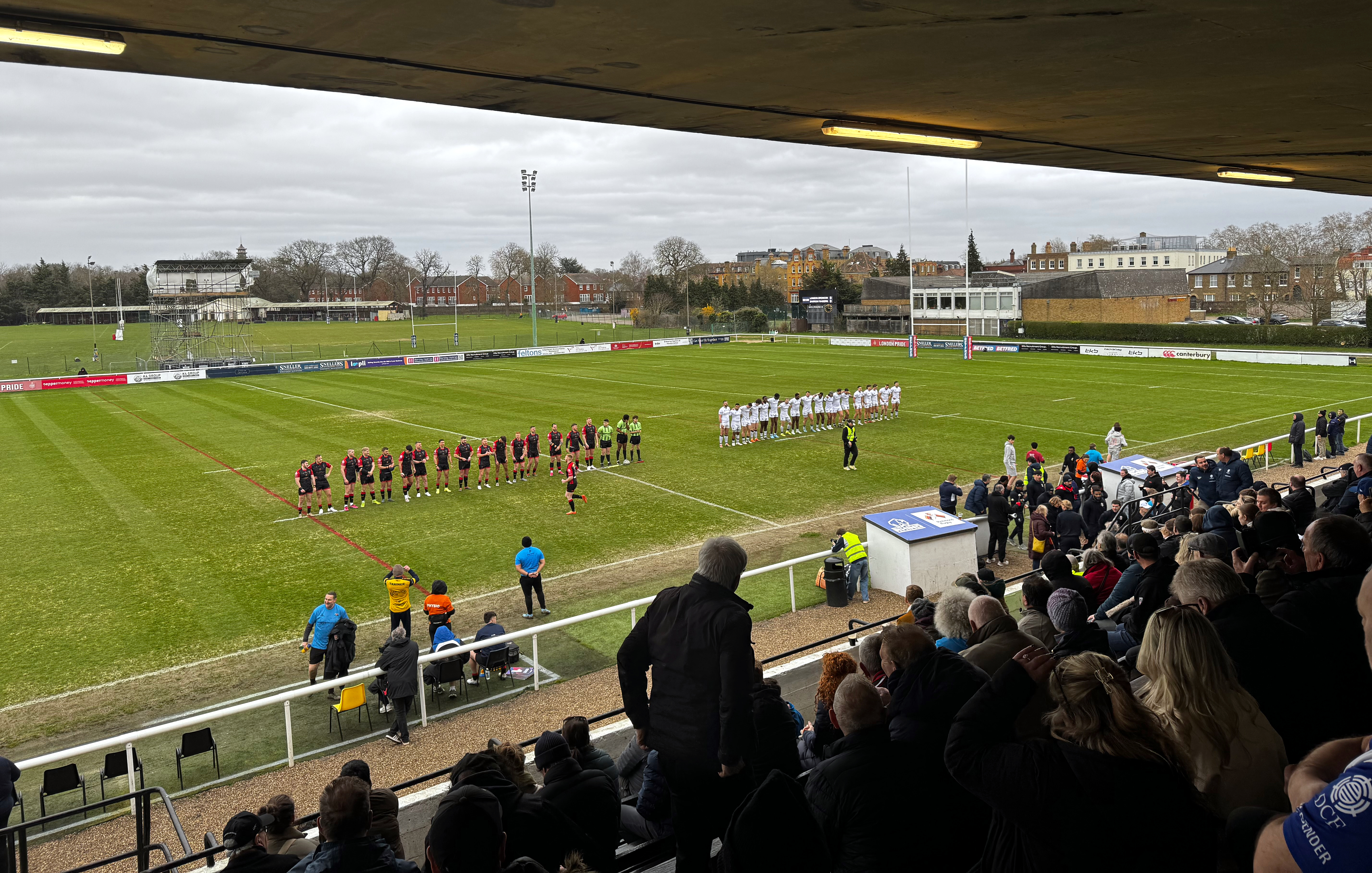
A minute's silence was observed in the 1895 Cup match against the Barrow Raiders in March for former London player Matt Salter who sadly passed away aged just 49

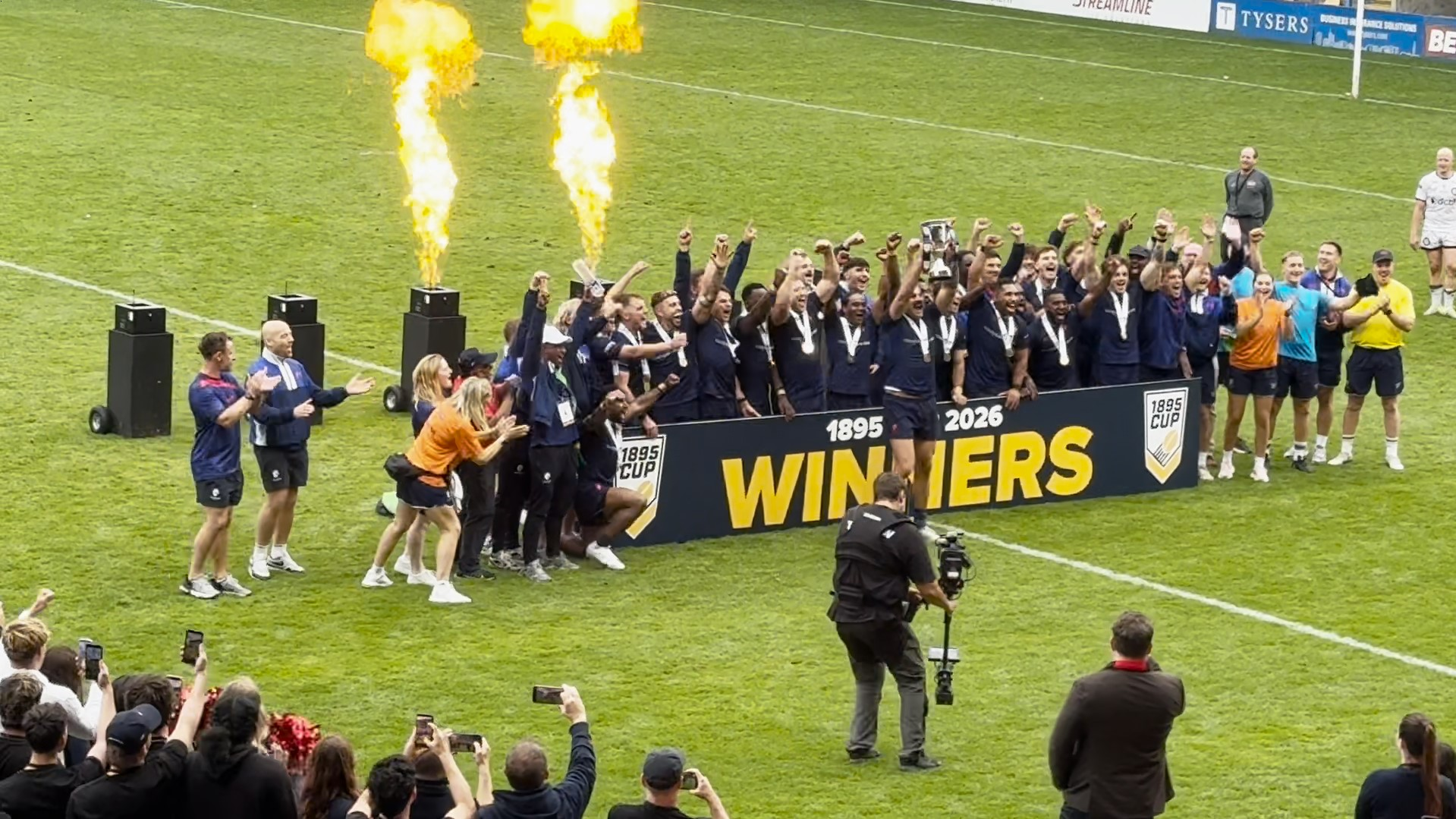
The 1895 Cup being hoisted after the 32-10 victory over the Widnes Vikings at the Halliwell Jones Stadium in August

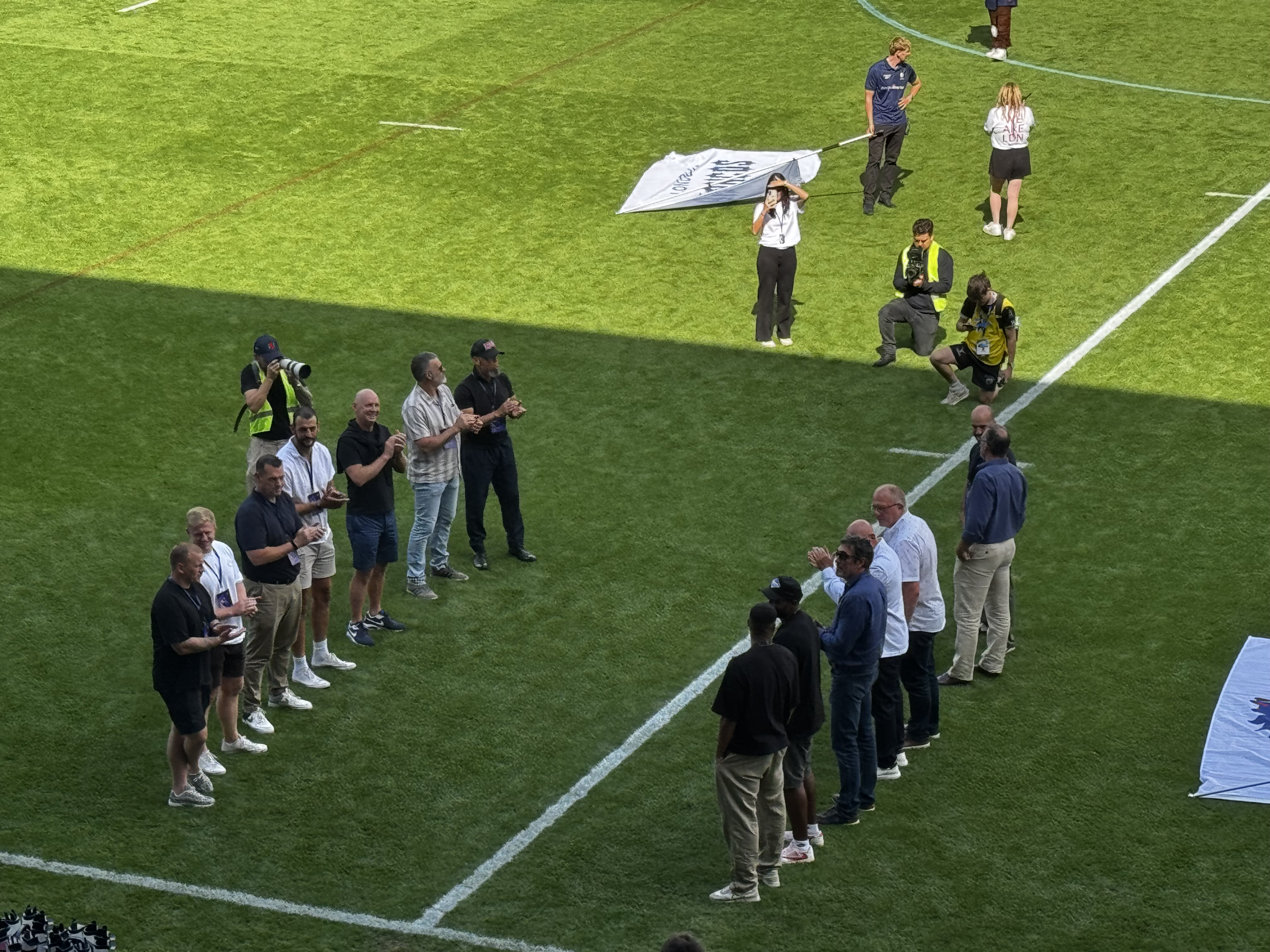
Old Boys guard of honour in August 2026

Fight initiated by the Swinton Lions in the final regular season game for the Broncos in September 2026

== 2026 transfers ==
=== Gains ===
Player	From	Competition	Contract	Date
(Australia) Reagan Campbell-Gillard	Gold Coast Titans	NRL		6 October 2025
(Tonga) Siliva Havili	South Sydney Rabbitohs	NRL		9 October 2025
(Australia) Dean Hawkins	Parramatta Eels	NRL		24 October 2025
(England) Sam Davis	Salford Red Devils	Super League		24 October 2025
(England) Jake Ramsden	Warrington Wolves	Super League		24 October 2025
(England) Bobby Hartley	Keighley Cougars	RFL League One		28 October 2025
(Papua New Guinea) Finley Glare	PNG Hunters	Queensland Cup	2 years	6 November 2025
(Papua New Guinea) Robert Mathias	PNG Hunters	Queensland Cup		10 November 2025
(Papua New Guinea) Gairo Voro	PNG Hunters	Queensland Cup	2 years	17 November 2025
(Papua New Guinea) Epel Kapinias	PNG Hunters	Queensland Cup		18 November 2025
(Papua New Guinea) Morea Morea	Central Queensland Capras	Queensland Cup	2 years	7 November 2025
(Papua New Guinea) Jeremiah Simbiken	Castleford Tigers	Super League		10 November 2025
(Nigeria) Elliot Wallis	Huddersfield Giants	Super League		13 November 2025
(England) Jack Croft	Wakefield Trinity	Super League		13 November 2025
(Australia) Marly Bitungane	North Queensland Cowboys	NRL	1 year	21 November 2025
(Australia) Luke Smith	Canterbury Bulldogs	NRL	1 year	21 November 2025
(England) James Meadows	Bradford Bulls	RFL Championship		4 December 2025
(Papua New Guinea) Alex Max	PNG Hunters	Queensland Cup		5 December 2025
(England) Jimmy Meadows	Bradford Bulls	RFL Championship		4 December 2025
(England) Tommy Porter	London Broncos	RFL Championship		23 January 2026
(Scotland) Rob Oakley	London Broncos	RFL Championship		2026

=== Losses ===
Player	From	Competition	Contract	Date
(Italy) Ethan Natoli	Pia XIII Baroudeur	Super XIII	1 year	5 August 2025
(France) Christopher Hellec	Limoux Grizzlies	Super XIII	1 year	26 September 2025
(Italy) Luke Polselli	Toulouse Olympique	Super League	1 year	26 October 2025

=== Loans in ===
Player	From	Competition	Contract	Date
(England) Neil Tchamambe	Wakefield Trinity	Super League	1 year – until end of season	21 October 2025

== Squad ==
2026 London Broncos squad
First team squad			Reserves	Coaching staff
(Papua New Guinea) 1 Morea Morea – FB (injured); (Nigeria) 2 Elliot Wallis – WG, CE; (Papua New Guinea) 3 Robert Mathias – CE, SR; (Papua New Guinea) 4 Alex Max – CE; (England) 5 Liam Tindall – WG; (Australia) 6 Connor O'Beirne – SH, LF; (Australia) 7 Dean Hawkins – SH, SO; (Australia) 8 Reagan Campbell-Gillard – PR; (England) 9 Sam Davis – HK; (Tanzania) 10 Emarly Bitungane – PR; (Australia) 11 Luke Smith – SR; (England) 12 Jack Croft – SR, CE; (Tonga) 13 Siliva Havili – LF, HK	(Papua New Guinea) 14 Finley Glare – HK, SO, SH; (Nigeria) 15 Sadiq Adebiyi – LF, SR, PR; (Papua New Guinea) 16 Epel Kapinias – PR, LF; (England) 17 Marcus Stock – LF, SR, PR; (England) 18 Jimmy Meadows – SH; (England) 19 Ben Hursey-Hord – PR; (Australia) 20 Brandon Webster-Mansfield – CE; (England) 21 Will Lovell – SR; (Scotland) 22 Alex Walker – FB; (Papua New Guinea) 23 Gairo Voro – SO; (Ireland) 24 Lewis Bienek – PR; (Papua New Guinea) 25 Jeremiah Simbiken – SR, LF (injured); (England) 26 Neil Tchamambe – WG	(England) 27 Ted Davidson – CE (injured); (England) 28 Bobby Hartley – SR; (England) 29 Jake Ramsden – SR; (England) 30 Tommy Porter – HK; (England) 31 Jamie Hewson – CE, WG; (Wales) 32 Jermarie Chatham – FB; (Scotland) 33 Henry Lenthall – SR; (Scotland) 34 Rob Oakley – LF, SR; (England) 35 Will Jones – WG, CE (red card); (England) 36 Joe Allison – PR; (England) 37 Charlie Randall – FB, CE; (England) 39 Finley Hay – PR	(England) -- Eddie Atherton – WG; (England) -- David Bofenda – WG; (England) -- Jack Hughes – PR; (England) -- Eamonn Iheme – PR; (England) -- Tyler Johnson-Thomas – SR; (England) -- Jasper McLachlan – HK, LF; (England) -- Luke Pheonix – CE; (England) -- Will Randall – SH; (Wales) -- Matt Ross – LF, SR; (England) -- Gethin Svenson-Davies – PR; (England) -- Jake Tilford – HK; (England) -- Matt Tootill – HK; (England) -- Oli Winterbottom – SH	Head coach: (Australia) Jason Demetriou; Assistant coach: (England) Danny Ward; Legend: (c) Captain(s); (vc) Vice-captain(s); (red card) = suspended; = injured; Updated: Source(s):

== Squad statistics ==
Squad number	Name	Nation	Position	Previous club	Appearances	Tries	Goals	Drop goals	Points	Notes
1	Morea Morea	(Papua New Guinea)	Fullback	Central Queensland Capras	19	29	1	0	118	(injured)
2	Elliot Wallis	(Nigeria)	Wing, Centre	Huddersfield Giants	30	17	0	0	68	
3	Robert Mathias	(Papua New Guinea)	Centre	PNG Hunters	16	18	0	0	72	
4	Alex Max	(Papua New Guinea)	Centre	PNG Hunters	12	17	0	0	68	
5	Liam Tindall	(England)	Wing	Hull FC	16	19	0	0	76	
6	Connor O'Beirne	(Australia)	Loose forward, Scrum-half	Lezignan	29	12	1	0	50	
7	Dean Hawkins	(Australia)	Scrum-half	Parramatta Eels	21	10	50	1	141	
8	Reagan Campbell-Gillard	(Australia)	Prop	Gold Coast Titans	27	7	0	0	28	
9	Sam Davis	(England)	Hooker	Salford Red Devils	17	2	0	0	8	
10	Marly Bitungane	(Tanzania)	Prop	North Queensland Cowboys	27	9	0	0	36	
11	Luke Smith	(Australia)	Second-row	Canterbury Bulldogs	29	26	1	0	106	
12	Jack Croft	(England)	Second-row	Wakefield Trinity	21	4	8	0	32	
13	Siliva Havili	(Tonga)	Loose forward, Hooker	South Sydney Rabbitohs	26	7	0	0	28	
14	Finley Glare	(Papua New Guinea)	Hooker	PNG Hunters	24	18	0	0	72	
15	Sadiq Adebiyi	(Nigeria)	Second-row, Loose forward, Prop	Keighley Cougars	19	6	0	0	24	
16	Epel Kapinias	(Papua New Guinea)	Prop	PNG Hunters	21	11	0	0	44	
17	Marcus Stock	(England)	Loose forward, Prop, Second-row	York Knights	22	9	0	0	36	
18	Jimmy Meadows	(England)	Scrum-half, Hooker	Bradford Bulls	26	10	150	0	340	
19	Ben Hursey-Hord	(England)	Loose forward, Second-row, Prop	Halifax Panthers	23	10	0	0	44	
20	Brandon Webster-Mansfield	(Australia)	Centre, Wing	Villefranche	22	23	2	0	96	
21	Will Lovell	(England)	Second-row	London Skolars	12	1	0	0	4	
22	Alex Walker	(Scotland)	Fullback	Halifax Panthers	11	12	1	0	50	
23	Gairo Voro	(Papua New Guinea)	Stand-off	PNG Hunters	32	39	60	0	276	
24	Lewis Bienek	(Ireland)	Prop	Castleford Tigers	24	8	0	0	32	
25	Jeremiah Simbiken	(Papua New Guinea)	Second-row	Castleford Tigers	2	0	0	0	0	(injured)
26	Neil Tchamambe	(England)	Wing	Wakefield Trinity	29	40	0	0	160	Loan
27	Ted Davidson	(England)	Centre	London Broncos Academy	9	4	9	0	34	(injured)
28	Bobby Hartley	(England)	Prop, Second-row	Keighley Cougars	4	0	0	0	0	
29	Jake Ramsden	(England)	Second-row, Loose forward	Warrington Wolves	2	0	0	0	0	
30	Tommy Porter	(England)	Hooker	Swinton Lions	1	1	0	0	4	
31	Jamie Hewson	(England)	Centre, Wing, Scrum-half	London Broncos Academy	1	0	0	0	0	
32	Jermarie Chatham	(Wales)	Wing, Fullback	London Broncos Reserves	0	0	0	0	0	
33	Henry Lenthall	(Scotland)	Second-row, Centre	London Broncos Reserves	1	2	0	0	8	
34	Rob Oakley	(Scotland)	Second-row, Loose forward	London Broncos	1	0	0	0	0	
35	Will Jones	(England)	Wing, Centre	London Broncos Reserves	1	0	0	0	0	Red card
36	Joe Allison	(England)	Prop	London Broncos Reserves	0	0	0	0	0	
37	Charlie Randall	(Scotland)	Fullback, Centre	London Broncos Reserves	0	0	0	0	0	
39	Finley Hay	(England)	Prop	London Broncos Reserves	1	0	0	0	0	

== Player appearances ==
No	Player	1	2R CC	2	3R CC	4	5	6	PRE 1895	7	8	10	1R 1895	11	12	13	QF 1895	14	3*	15	SF 1895	18	17*	19	20	21	22	23	24	25	FINAL 1895	26	QF1	PF1	GF
1	Morea Morea	FB	FB	FB	FB	FB	FB	FB	injured	injured	FB	FB	FB	FB	FB	FB	FB	FB	FB	FB	injured	injured	injured	injured	injured	injured	injured	injured	injured	injured	injured	injured	injured	SUB	SUB
2	Elliot Wallis	WG	WG	WG	x	CE	CE	injured	CE	CE	CE	CE	WG	WG	CE	CE	CE	CE	WG	WG	WG	CE	WG	WG	WG	WG	WG	WG	WG	x	WG	x	WG	WG	WG
3	Robert Mathias	CE	CE	CE	injured	injured	injured	injured	injured	injured	injured	injured	CE	CE	injured	injured	injured	injured	injured	injured	injured	injured	injured	CE	CE	CE	CE	CE	CE	CE	CE	x	CE	CE	CE
4	Alex Max	CE	CE	CE	CE	injured	injured	injured	injured	injured	injured	injured	CE	CE	injured	injured	injured	injured	injured	injured	injured	injured	injured	SUB	x	SUB	CE	CE	CE	x	x	CE	x	x	x
5	Liam Tindall	x	WG	WG	WG	WG	WG	WG	WG	WG	WG	WG	x	x	WG	WG	WG	WG	x	x	x	WG	x	x	x	injured	injured	injured	injured	injured	injured	WG	x	x	x
6	Connor O'Beirne	SO	SUB	SUB	SH	SUB	x	SUB	injured	SO	SUB	SUB	SUB	SUB	SUB	SUB	SUB	SUB	SUB	SUB	SUB	SUB	SH	SUB	SUB	SUB	SUB	x	SUB	x	SUB	x	SUB	SUB	SUB
7	Dean Hawkins	SH	SH	SO	SO	injured	injured	injured	injured	injured	x	SH	SH	SH	SH	SH	injured	x	x	SH	SH	x	x	x	SH	SH	SH	SH	SH	SH	SH	x	SH	SH	SH
8	Reagan Campbell-Gillard	PR	x	PR	PR	injured	injured	injured	injured	PR	x	PR	PR	PR	PR	PR	PR	PR	PR	PR	PR	PR	PR	PR	PR	PR	PR	PR	PR	PR	PR	x	PR	PR	PR
9	Sam Davis	injured	injured	injured	injured	HK	HK	HK	HK	HK	HK	x	HK	x	HK	HK	HK	HK	HK	x	injured	injured	SUB	injured	injured	injured	injured	HK	x	x	x	HK	x	HK	HK
10	Marly Bitungane	SUB	x	SUB	SUB	PR	PR	x	PR	x	PR	PR	PR	SUB	PR	injured	injured	SUB	PR	PR	PR	PR	PR	PR	PR	x	SUB	PR	LF	SUB	SUB	x	SUB	PR	PR
11	Luke Smith	SR	x	SR	SR	SR	SR	SR	SR	SUB	SR	SR	x	SR	SR	SR	SR	SR	SR	SR	SR	SR	CE	SR	SR	SR	SR	x	SR	CE	SR	x	SR	SR	SR
12	Jack Croft	SR	SR	SR	SR	SR	SR	SR	SH	x	SR	x	SR	SR	injured	injured	injured	injured	injured	injured	injured	injured	injured	injured	x	SUB	SR	SR	SR	x	SR	SO	SR	SR	SR
13	Siliva Havili	HK	x	injured	injured	injured	LF	LF	LF	LF	LF	LF	LF	LF	LF	Red card	Red card	LF	LF	LF	HK	LF	LF	LF	LF	LF	LF	x	HK	LF	LF	x	HK	LF	LF
14	Finley Glare	injured	SUB	SUB	HK	SUB	SUB	SUB	injured	injured	injured	injured	injured	injured	injured	injured	SUB	SUB	SUB	HK	SUB	HK	HK	HK	HK	HK	HK	SUB	SUB	HK	HK	x	SUB	SUB	SUB
15	Sadiq Adebiyi	LF	x	LF	LF	SUB	SUB	SUB	injured	injured	injured	injured	injured	SUB	18th	LF	LF	PR	SR	SUB	LF	SUB	injured	injured	injured	injured	x	x	x	SUB	SUB	SR	LF	x	x
16	Epel Kapinias	PR	PR	PR	PR	PR	PR	PR	PR	PR	PR	SUB	x	PR	SUB	injured	injured	injured	injured	injured	injured	injured	injured	SUB	x	PR	PR	SUB	SUB	PR	PR	x	PR	x	x
17	Marcus Stock	x	LF	x	x	LF	SUB	PR	SUB	SUB	SUB	SUB	SUB	x	SUB	injured	injured	x	SUB	SUB	SUB	SUB	SUB	x	SUB	SUB	SUB	LF	SUB	SUB	x	PR	x	x	x
18	Jimmy Meadows	SUB	HK	HK	SUB	SH	SO	SH	injured	SH	SH	HK	SUB	HK	SUB	SUB	SH	SH	SH	SUB	CE	SH	x	SH	FB	FB	FB	injured	injured	injured	injured	injured	x	FB	FB
19	Ben Hursey-Hord	x	SUB	x	x	SUB	SUB	SUB	SUB	SUB	SUB	SUB	x	injured	SR	SUB	SUB	SUB	SUB	SR	SR	SR	SR	SR	SR	SUB	x	SUB	SR	x	x	PR	x	x	x
20	Brandon Webster-Mansfield	x	x	x	CE	CE	CE	CE	CE	CE	CE	CE	x	injured	injured	injured	CE	CE	CE	CE	WG	x	CE	CE	CE	CE	x	x	x	WG	CE	x	CE	CE	CE
21	Will Lovell	x	SR	x	x	x	x	x	SR	SR	x	SR	SR	injured	injured	SR	SR	SR	x	x	x	x	SR	x	x	injured	injured	SR	x	SR	x	SR	x	x	x
22	Alex Walker	x	x	x	x	x	x	x	FB	FB	x	x	x	x	x	x	x	x	x	x	FB	FB	FB	FB	x	x	x	FB	FB	FB	FB	x	FB	x	x
23	Gairo Voro	SUB	SO	SH	SUB	SO	SH	SO	SO	x	SO	SO	SO	SO	SO	SO	SO	SO	SO	SO	SO	SO	SO	SO	SO	SO	SO	SO	SO	SO	SO	x	SO	SO	SO
24	Lewis Bienek	SUB	PR	SUB	SUB	injured	injured	injured	SUB	SUB	SUB	x	SUB	SUB	x	SUB	SUB	x	x	x	SUB	SUB	SUB	SUB	SUB	x	SUB	SUB	PR	SUB	SUB	x	SUB	SUB	SUB
25	Jeremiah Simbiken	injured	injured	injured	injured	injured	x	x	SUB	SR	x	x	x	x	x	x	x	injured	injured	injured	injured	injured	injured	injured	injured	injured	injured	injured	injured	injured	injured	injured	injured	injured	injured
26	Neil Tchamambe	WG	x	x	WG	WG	WG	WG	WG	WG	WG	WG	WG	WG	WG	WG	WG	WG	WG	WG	x	WG	WG	WG	WG	WG	WG	x	WG	WG	WG	x	WG	WG	WG
27	Ted Davidson	x	x	x	x	x	x	CE	x	x	x	x	x	x	CE	CE	x	x	CE	CE	CE	CE	x	x	x	x	x	WG	x	x	x	FB	injured	injured	injured
28	Bobby Hartley	x	SUB	x	x	x	x	x	x	x	x	x	x	x	x	PR	PR	x	x	x	x	x	x	x	x	x	x	x	x	x	x	SUB	x	x	x
29	Jake Ramsden	x	x	x	x	x	x	x	x	x	x	x	x	x	x	x	x	x	x	x	x	x	SUB	x	x	injured	injured	injured	injured	injured	injured	SUB	x	x	x
30	Tommy Porter	x	x	x	x	x	x	x	x	x	x	x	x	x	x	x	x	x	x	x	x	x	x	x	x	x	x	x	x	x	x	SUB	x	x	x
31	Jamie Hewson	x	x	x	x	x	x	x	x	x	x	x	x	x	x	x	x	x	x	x	x	x	x	x	x	x	x	x	x	x	x	SH	x	x	x
32	Jermarie Chatham	x	x	x	x	x	x	x	x	x	x	x	x	x	x	x	x	x	x	x	x	x	x	x	x	x	x	x	x	x	x	x	x	x	x
33	Henry Lenthall	x	x	x	x	x	x	x	x	x	x	x	x	x	x	x	x	x	x	x	x	x	x	x	x	x	x	x	x	x	x	CE	x	x	x
34	Rob Oakley	x	x	x	x	x	x	x	x	x	x	x	x	x	x	x	x	x	x	x	x	x	x	x	x	x	x	x	x	x	x	LF	x	x	x
35	Will Jones	x	x	x	x	x	x	x	x	x	x	x	x	x	x	x	x	x	x	x	x	x	x	x	x	x	x	x	x	x	x	WG	x	x	x
36	Joe Allison	x	x	x	x	x	x	x	x	x	x	x	x	x	x	x	x	x	x	x	x	x	x	x	x	x	x	x	x	x	x	x	x	x	x
37	Charlie Randall	x	x	x	x	x	x	x	x	x	x	x	x	x	x	x	x	x	x	x	x	x	x	x	x	x	x	x	x	x	x	x	x	x	x
39	Finley Hay	x	x	x	x	x	x	x	x	x	x	x	x	x	x	x	x	x	x	x	x	x	x	x	x	x	x	x	x	x	x	SUB	x	x	x

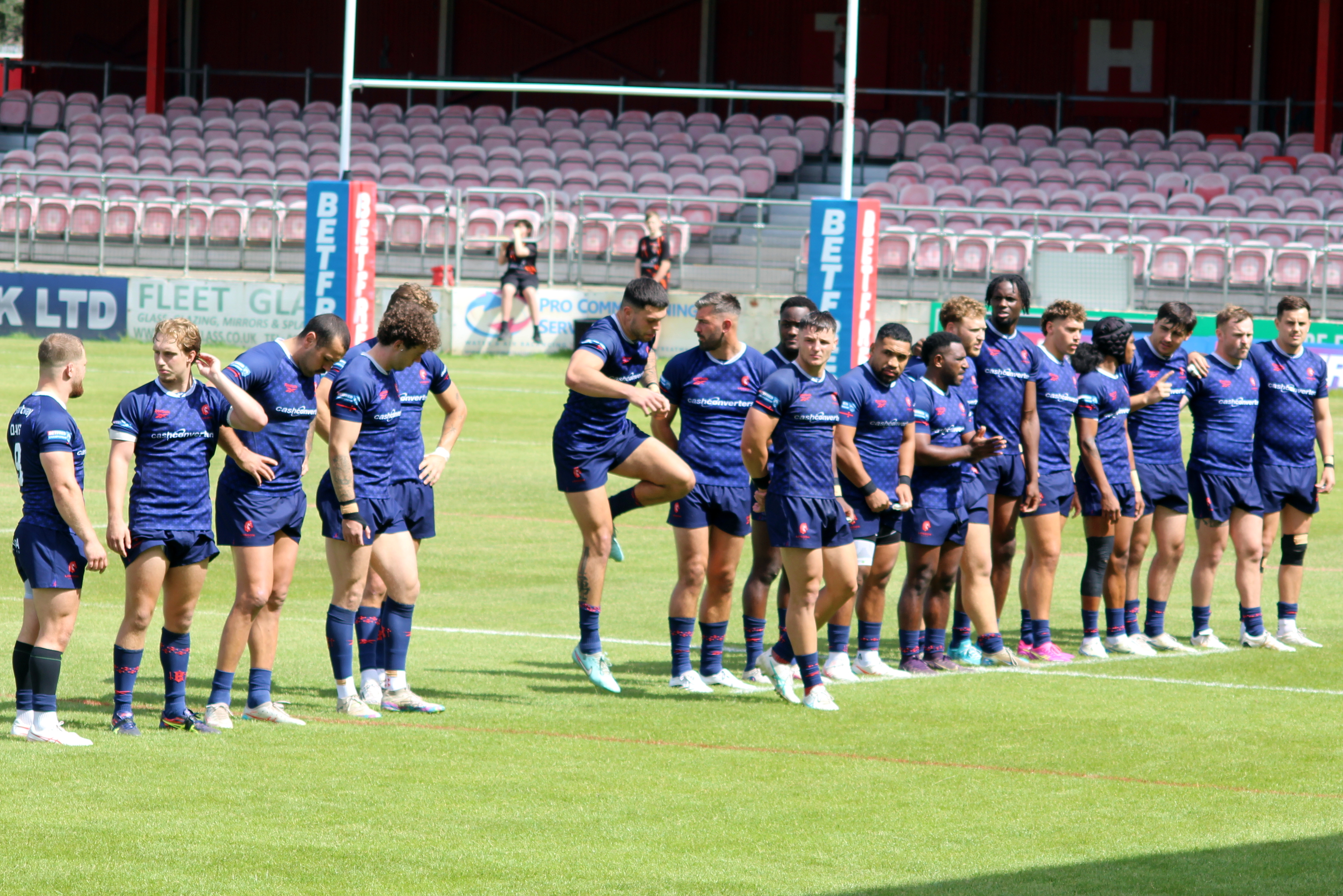
Pre-match against Hunslet at Stonebridge Road in July 2026

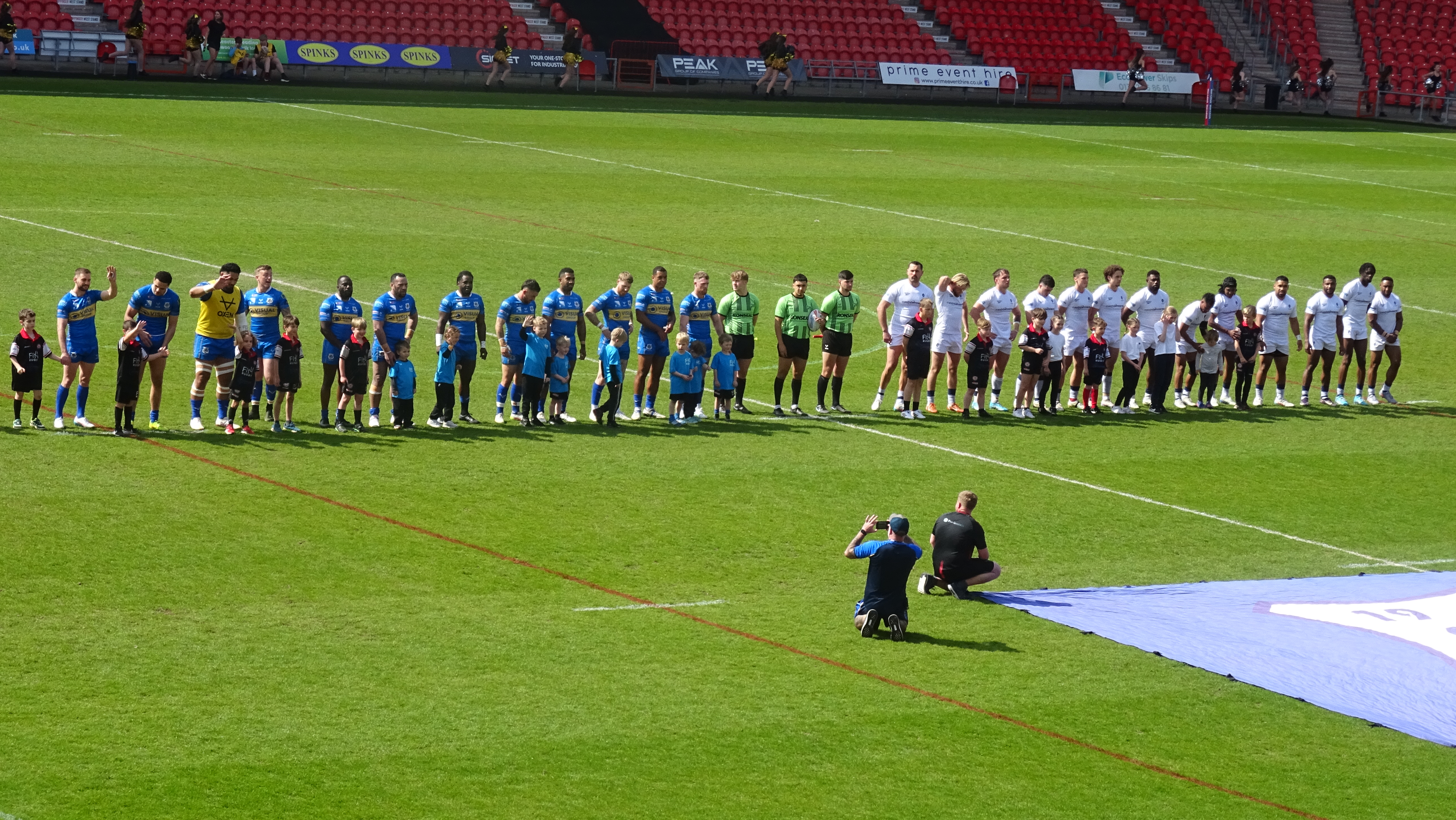
Pre-match at the top-of-the table clash at Doncaster in April 2026

Grand Final celebrations in October 2026

London Broncos celebrating the Championship Grand Final victory

London Broncos staff evening celebrations on the pitch in October 2026

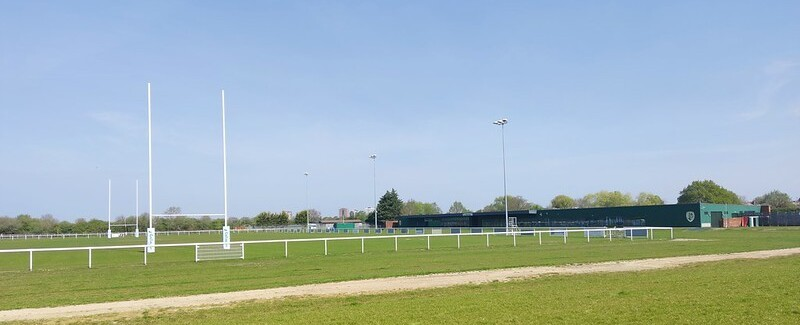
A training pitch and the Hazelwood Centre running along the sideline

== Players making their London Broncos debut in 2026 ==
743. (Papua New Guinea) Morea Morea
744. (Nigeria) Elliot Wallis
745. (Papua New Guinea) Robert Mathias
746. (Papua New Guinea) Alex Max
747. (England) Neil Tchamambe
748. (Australia) Dean Hawkins
749. (Australia) Reagan Campbell-Gillard
750. (Tonga) Siliva Havili
751. (Papua New Guinea) Epel Kapinias
752. (Australia) Luke Smith
753. (England) Jack Croft
754. (Tanzania) Emarly Bitungane
755. (Papua New Guinea) Gairo Voro
756. (Papua New Guinea) Finley Glare
757. (England) Bobby Hartley
758. (Papua New Guinea) Jeremiah Simbiken
759. (England) Jake Ramsden
760. (England) Will Jones
761. (Scotland) Henry Lenthall
762. (England) Jamie Hewson
763. (England) Finley Hay

== Records broken during the season ==
The 2026 campaign saw a number of club records equalled, broken, or re-broken through the season, along with domestic and world records.

=== Team Records ===
==== Biggest London Broncos wins ====
- 86-0 vs Wests Warriors at Richmond Athletic Ground in the Challenge Cup on 25 January 2026
- 106-18 vs North Wales Crusaders at Plough Lane in the RFL Championship on 28 February 2026
- 134-0 vs North Wales Crusaders at the Eirias Stadium in the RFL Championship on 7 June 2026

==== Biggest win in professional rugby league ====
- 134-0 vs North Wales Crusaders at the Eirias Stadium in the RFL Championship on 7 June 2026. It was also the widest winning margin in professional rugby league.

==== Biggest away win in rugby league ====
- 134-0 vs North Wales Crusaders at the Eirias Stadium in the RFL Championship on 7 June 2026 is the widest away win and widest away winning margin of all time.

==== Most points in a London Broncos league season ====
The club record for most points in a league season was broken in the June victory over Batley. The score record was set in the 2018 Championship season at 907 points. At the end of the regular season the club record stands at 1,511.

==== Most points in a League season ====
London overtook the 1,306 by Leigh from 27 Championship matches during the 2022 RFL Championship season. At the end of the regular season the record stands at 1,511 from 24 Championship games.

==== Biggest points differential in a League season ====
London overtook the 1,098 points difference by the then Leigh Centurions from 27 Championship matches during the 2022 season. At the end of the regular season the record stands at 1,215 from 24 Championship games.

==== Most points ever in a season ====
London overtook the 1,735 points recorded by Wigan during their 1994-95 season. The Broncos extended the record to 2,034 points with the Grand Final victory in October.

==== Longest winning and undefeated streak in matches ====
London had their longest winning and also unbeaten run in their history, with the club record extended to 23 matches in all competitions, and their league record to 21 matches.

==== Most tries by the London Broncos in a match ====
- 16 tries vs Wests Warriors at Richmond Athletic Ground in the Challenge Cup on 25 January 2026
- 18 tries vs North Wales Crusaders at Plough Lane in the RFL Championship on 28 February 2026
- 25 tries vs North Wales Crusaders at the Eirias Stadium in the RFL Championship on 7 June 2026

==== Most goals by the London Broncos in a match ====
- 17 goals vs North Wales Crusaders at Plough Lane in the RFL Championship on 28 February 2026
- 17 goals vs North Wales Crusaders at the Eirias Stadium in the RFL Championship on 7 June 2026

=== Player Records ===
==== Most appearances for the London Broncos ====
- Will Lovell overtook Steele Retchless and his 202 games for the club to be the most capped player for the London Broncos ever. Upon his retirement at the end of the 2026 season Lovell had played 210 games for London.
- Alex Walker joined Retchless on 202 games in the penultimate round of the regular season, and moved into second place on the all-time list with 203 games in London's 1895 Cup final triumph.

==== Most points by a player in a match ====
- Jimmy Meadows scored 42 points in the 106–18 victory over the North Wales Crusaders at Plough Lane in the RFL Championship on 28 February 2026
- Gairo Voro scored 44 points in the 78–16 victory over Hunslet at Stonebridge Road in the RFL Championship on 4 July 2026

==== Most goals by a player in a match ====
Jimmy Meadows kicked 17 goals in the 106–18 victory over the North Wales Crusaders at Plough Lane in the RFL Championship on 28 February 2026

==== Most tries by a player in a match ====
- Brandon Webster-Mansfield equalled Martin Offiah and Sean Morris' record of five tries in a game in the 134–0 victory over the North Wales Crusaders at the Eirias Stadium in the RFL Championship on 7 June 2026
- Gairo Voro scored seven tries in the 78–16 victory over Hunslet at Stonebridge Road in the RFL Championship on 4 July 2026

==== Most tries by a London Broncos forward in a season ====
- 26 tries by Luke Smith.

== End of season awards ==
London Broncos Award	Winner
Fans Player of the Year	Neil Tchamambe
Coaches Player of the Year	Connor O'Beirne
Players Player of the Year	Marly Bitungane
Young Player of the Year	Gairo Voro

Championship Award	Winner
Championship Player of the Year	Gairo Voro
