= Neil Tchamambe =

English professional rugby league footballer

Personal information
- Full name: Neil Tchamambé
- Born: 14 February 2005 (age 21) Leeds, West Yorkshire, England
- Height: 6 ft 6 in (1.97 m)
- Weight: 14 st 5 lb (91 kg)

Playing information
- Position: Wing
Club
Years	Team	Pld	T	G	FG	P
2024–25	Hull Kingston Rovers	0	0	0	0	0
2024(loan)	→ Whitehaven	2	1	0	0	4
2025(loan)	→ Wakefield Trinity	0	0	0	0	0
2025–26	Wakefield Trinity	0	0	0	0	0
2025(loan)	→ Goole Vikings	10	9	0	0	36
2025(loan)	→ Salford Red Devils	4	2	0	0	8
2026(loan)	→ London Broncos	29	40	0	0	160
2027–	London Broncos	0	0	0	0	0
	Total	45	52	0	0	208
- Source: As of 17 November 2026

Neil Tchamambe (born 14 February 2005) is an English professional rugby league footballer who plays as a winger for the London Broncos in the Super League.

He previously played for Whitehaven on loan from Hull Kingston Rovers in the Super League. He also spent time on loan at Wakefield Trinity in the Super League from Hull KR. Tchamambe has also spent time on loan from Wakefield at the Goole Vikings in RFL League One, Salford Red Devils in the top flight and the London Broncos in the RFL Championship.

== Early life ==
Tchamambe was born in Leeds, West Yorkshire, England.

He played for the Leeds Irish Clovers as a junior. He played in a national final in 2018 for Corpus Christi. He studied at Notre Dame sixth-form college.

He came through the Academy ranks at the Leeds Rhinos, and won the Academy Grand Final. Tchamambe is an England Academy international.

== Career ==
=== Hull Kingston Rovers ===
Tchamambe joined Hull Kingston Rovers from the Leeds Rhinos on a two year deal for the 2024 and 2025 seasons.

=== Whitehaven ===
In 2024 he played for the Whitehaven in the RFL Championship, on loan from Hull Kingston Rovers.

=== Wakefield ===
He joined Wakefield Trinity from Hull KR, on a season long loan just ahead of the 2025 season. He later signed a permanent deal with Wakefield, with Noah Booth moving in the opposite direction.

=== Goole Vikings ===
In 2025 he joined the Goole Vikings in RFL League One, on a season long loan from Wakefield Trinity.

=== Salford Red Devils ===
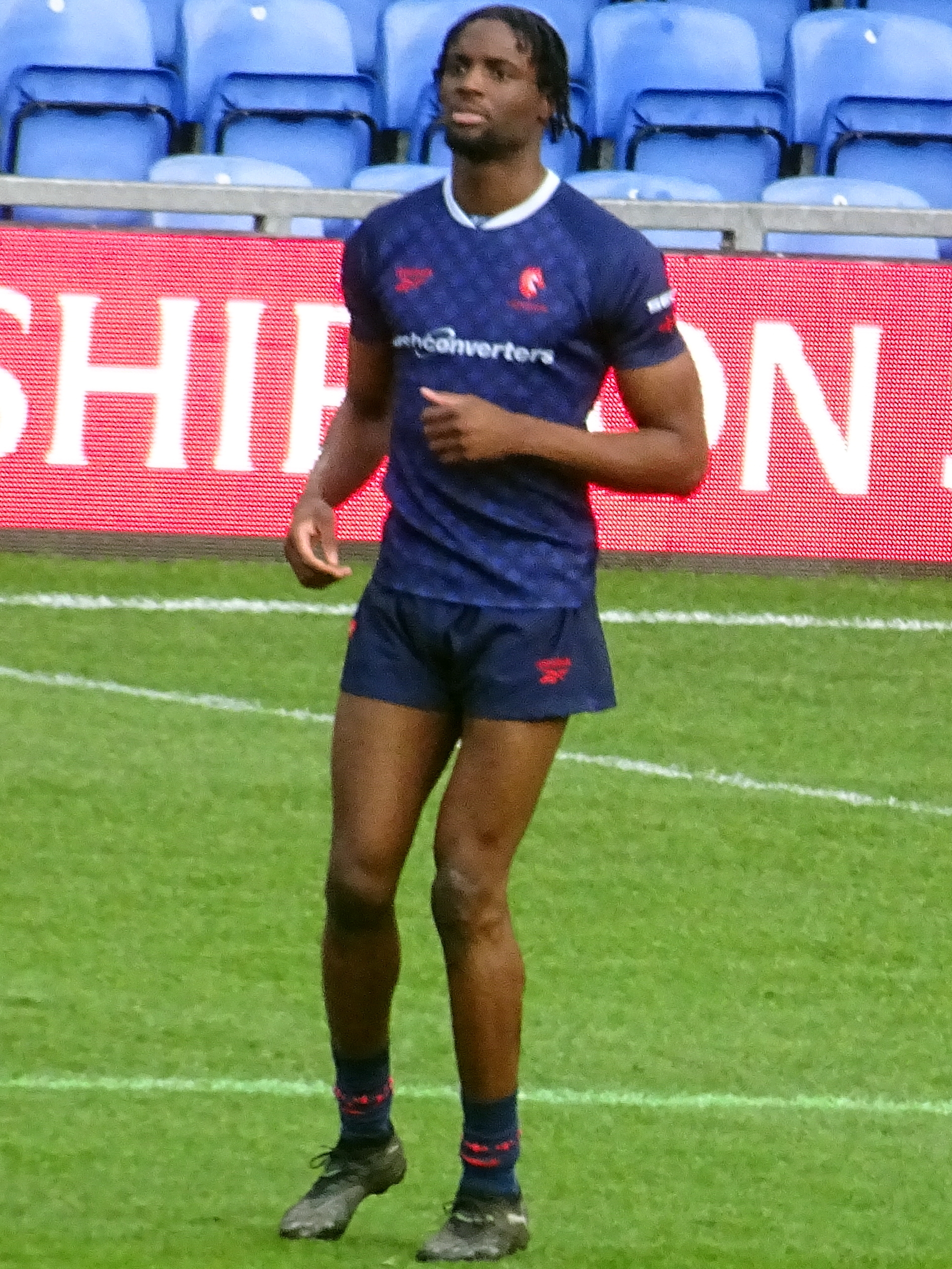
Tchamambe playing for the London Broncos in 2026

Tchamambe played on loan from Wakefield for the Salford Red Devils in the Super League in 2025.

=== London Broncos (loan) ===
On 21 October 2025 it was reported that he had signed for the London Broncos in the RFL Championship, on a season long loan from Wakefield Trinity.

In August 2026, he was part of the Broncos squad that lifted the RFL Championship Leaders' Shield.

He played in London's 1895 Cup Final victory over the Widnes Vikings at the Halliwell Jones Stadium in August 2026.

In September 2026 he was named Fans Player of the Year at the clubs awards night.

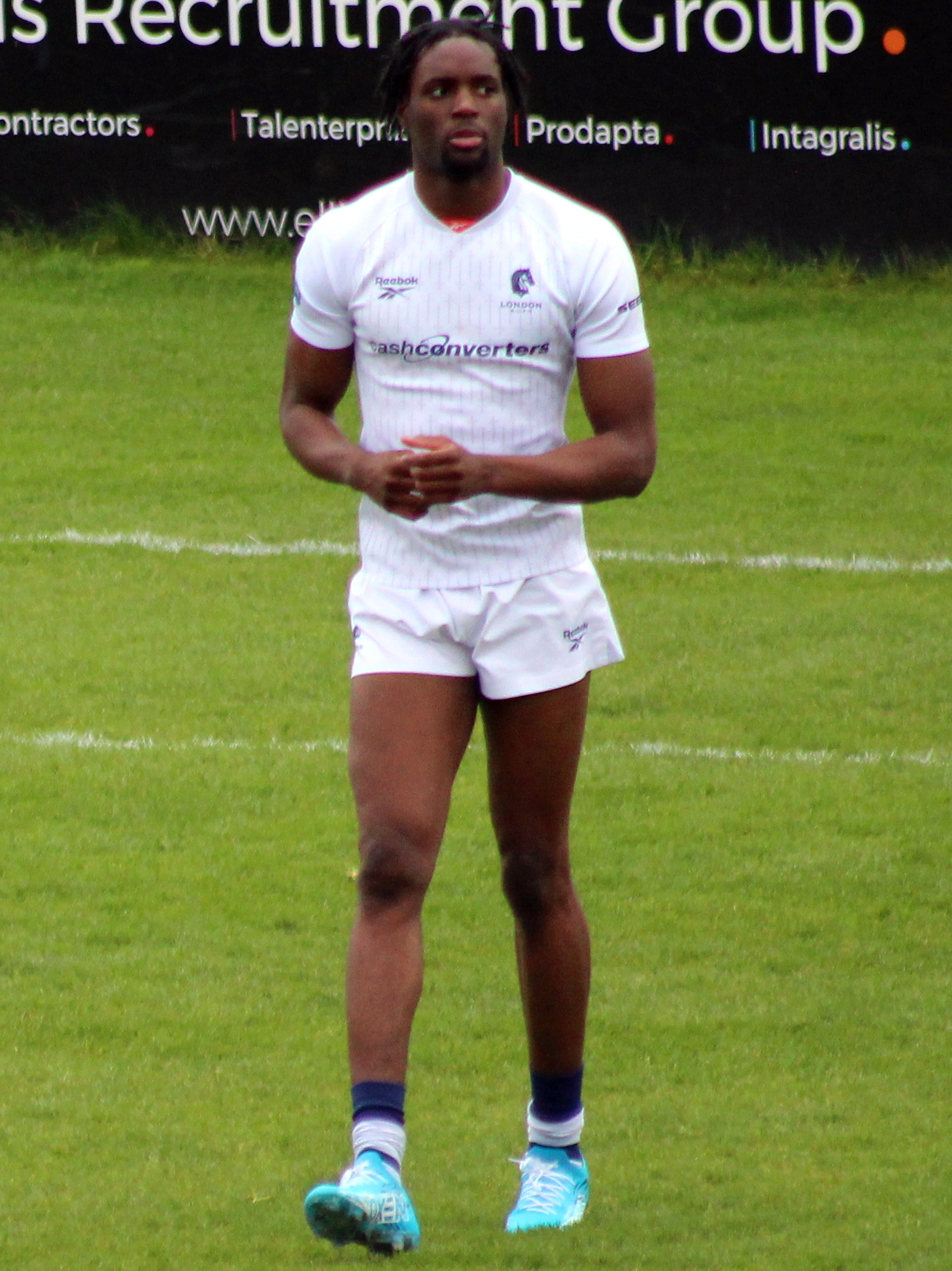
Tchamambe warming up for the London Broncos in 2026

In October 2026, he played in the Broncos Championship Grand Final victory over Doncaster at Plough Lane.

=== London Broncos ===
On 17 November 2026 it was reported that he had signed a permanent 2-year deal with the London Broncos in the Super League.

== Club statistics ==
Year	Club	League Competition	Appearances	Tries	Goals	Drop goals	Points	Notes
2024	Hull Kingston Rovers	2024 Super League	0	0	0	0	0	
2024	Whitehaven	2024 RFL Championship	2	1	0	0	4	loan
2025	Hull Kingston Rovers	2025 Super League	0	0	0	0	0	
2025	Wakefield Trinity	2025 Super League	0	0	0	0	0	loan
2025	Wakefield Trinity	2025 Super League	0	0	0	0	0	
2025	Goole Vikings	2025 RFL League One	10	9	0	0	36	loan
2025	Salford Red Devils	2025 Super League	4	2	0	0	8	loan
2026	Wakefield Trinity	2026 Super League	0	0	0	0	0	
2026	London Broncos	2026 RFL Championship	29	40	0	0	160	loan
2027	London Broncos	2027 Super League	0	0	0	0	0	
Club career total			45	52	0	0	208	
