= Luke Smith (rugby league) =

Australian rugby league footballer

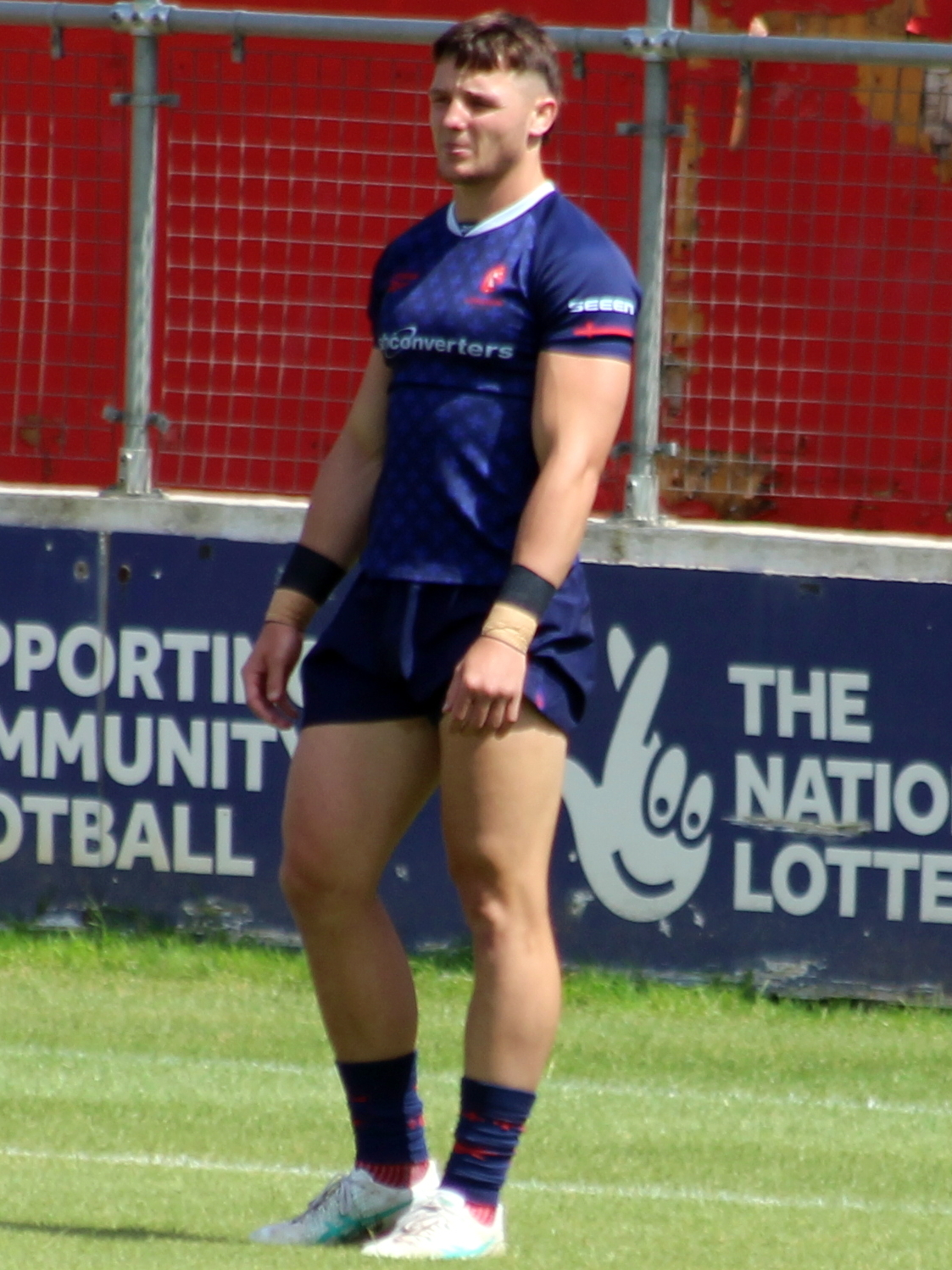

Personal information
- Full name: Luke Smith
- Born: 29 March 2003 (age 23) Muswellbrook, New South Wales, Australia
- Height: 6 ft 0 in (1.82 m)
- Weight: 14 st 5 lb (91 kg)

Playing information
- Position: Second-row, Centre
Club
Years	Team	Pld	T	G	FG	P
2024–25	Canterbury Bulldogs	2	0	0	0	0
2026	London Broncos	29	26	1	0	106
2027–	Perth Bears	0	0	0	0	0
	Total	31	26	1	0	106
- Source: As of 16 November 2026

Luke Smith (born 3 March 2003) is an Australian professional rugby league footballer who plays as a second-row forward or centre for the Perth Bears in the NRL.

He previously played for the Canterbury-Bankstown Bulldogs in the National Rugby League and the London Broncos in the RFL Championship.

== Background ==
Growing up in Muswellbrook, Smith played his junior football for the Denman Devils before moving to Sydney after signing with Canterbury. Smith's father, Brenn, & brother, Daniel, both played a high level of rugby league.

== Career ==
=== Canterbury-Bankstown Bulldogs ===
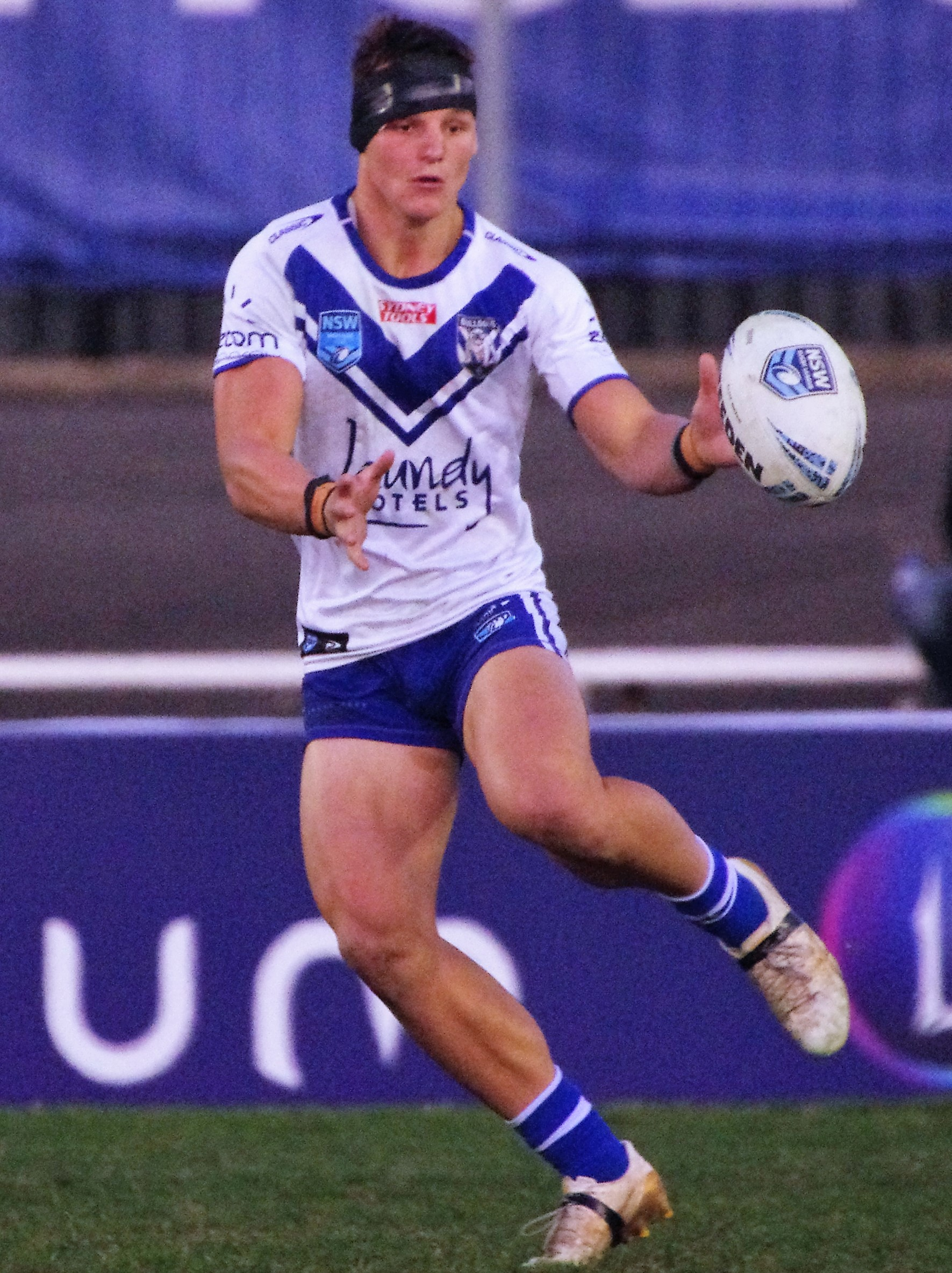
Smith playing for the Canterbury Bulldogs in 2023

In Round 11 2025, Smith made his NRL debut for Canterbury against the Sydney Roosters. Coming off the bench in a 24–20 win at Accor Stadium.

=== London Broncos ===
On 10 November 2025 it was reported that he had signed for the London Broncos in the RFL Championship on a one-year deal.

In 2026 Smith broke the record for the most tries by a London Broncos forward in a season. He has scored 26 tries as of September 2026.

In August 2026, he was part of the Broncos squad that lifted the RFL Championship Leaders' Shield.

He played in London's 1895 Cup Final victory over the Widnes Vikings at the Halliwell Jones Stadium in August 2026.

In October 2026, he played in the Broncos Championship Grand Final victory over Doncaster at Plough Lane.

=== Perth Bears ===
On 3 December 2025 it was announced that Smith would join the Perth Bears ahead of the 2027 NRL season. He signed a two-year deal with the Western Australian expansion club.

== Club statistics ==
Year	Club	League Competition	Appearances	Tries	Goals	Drop goals	Points	Notes
2024	Canterbury-Bankstown Bulldogs	2024 NRL season	0	0	0	0	0	Played one pre-season game
2024	Canterbury-Bankstown Bulldogs	2024 NSW Cup season	5	2	0	0	8	
2025	Canterbury-Bankstown Bulldogs	2025 NRL season	2	0	0	0	0	Played two pre-season games
2025	Canterbury-Bankstown Bulldogs	2025 NSW Cup season	16	6	0	0	24	
2026	London Broncos	2026 RFL Championship	29	26	1	0	106	
2027	Perth Bears	2027 NRL season						
Club career total			52	34	1	0	138	
