= Jack Croft =

English rugby league footballer

Personal information
- Full name: Jack Hamilton Croft
- Born: 21 December 2000 (age 25) Keighley, West Yorkshire, England
- Height: 6 ft 0 in (1.83 m)
- Weight: 15 st 8 lb (99 kg)

Playing information
- Position: Centre, Second-row
Club
Years	Team	Pld	T	G	FG	P
2019–22	Wakefield Trinity	18	2	0	0	8
2020(loan)	→ Oldham	2	0	0	0	0
2021(loan)	→ Oldham	2	1	0	0	4
2022(loan)	→ Barrow Raiders	3	0	0	0	0
2022(loan)	→ Newcastle Thunder	6	3	0	0	12
2023	Wynnum Manly Seagulls	3	1	0	0	4
2023–25	Wakefield Trinity	43	9	0	0	36
2025(loan)	→ Salford Red Devils	1	0	0	0	0
2026–	London Broncos	21	4	8	0	32
	Total	99	20	8	0	96
- Source: As of 19 November 2026

Jack Croft (born 21 December 2000) is a professional rugby league footballer who plays as a second-row or centre for the London Broncos in the Super League.

Croft has previously had time on loan at Oldham RLFC, Newcastle Thunder, Barrow Raiders and the Salford Red Devils.

== Playing career ==
=== Wakefield Trinity ===
In 2019 he made his Challenge Cup début for Wakefield against St Helens.

=== Oldham (loan) ===
On 28 April 2021 it was reported that he had signed for Oldham in the RFL Championship on a season-long loan.

=== Salford Red Devils (loan) ===
On 27 August 2025 it was reported that he had signed for Salford Red Devils in the Super League on loan on a game-by-game basis

=== Wynnum Manly Seagulls ===
Croft joined the Wynnum Manly Seagulls ahead of the 2023 Queensland Cup season.

=== London Broncos ===
On 16 November 2025 it was reported that he had signed for the London Broncos in the RFL Championship.

In August 2026, he was part of the Broncos squad that lifted the RFL Championship Leaders' Shield.

He played in London's 1895 Cup Final victory over the Widnes Vikings at the Halliwell Jones Stadium in August 2026.

In October 2026, he played in the Broncos Championship Grand Final victory over Doncaster at Plough Lane.

== Club statistics ==
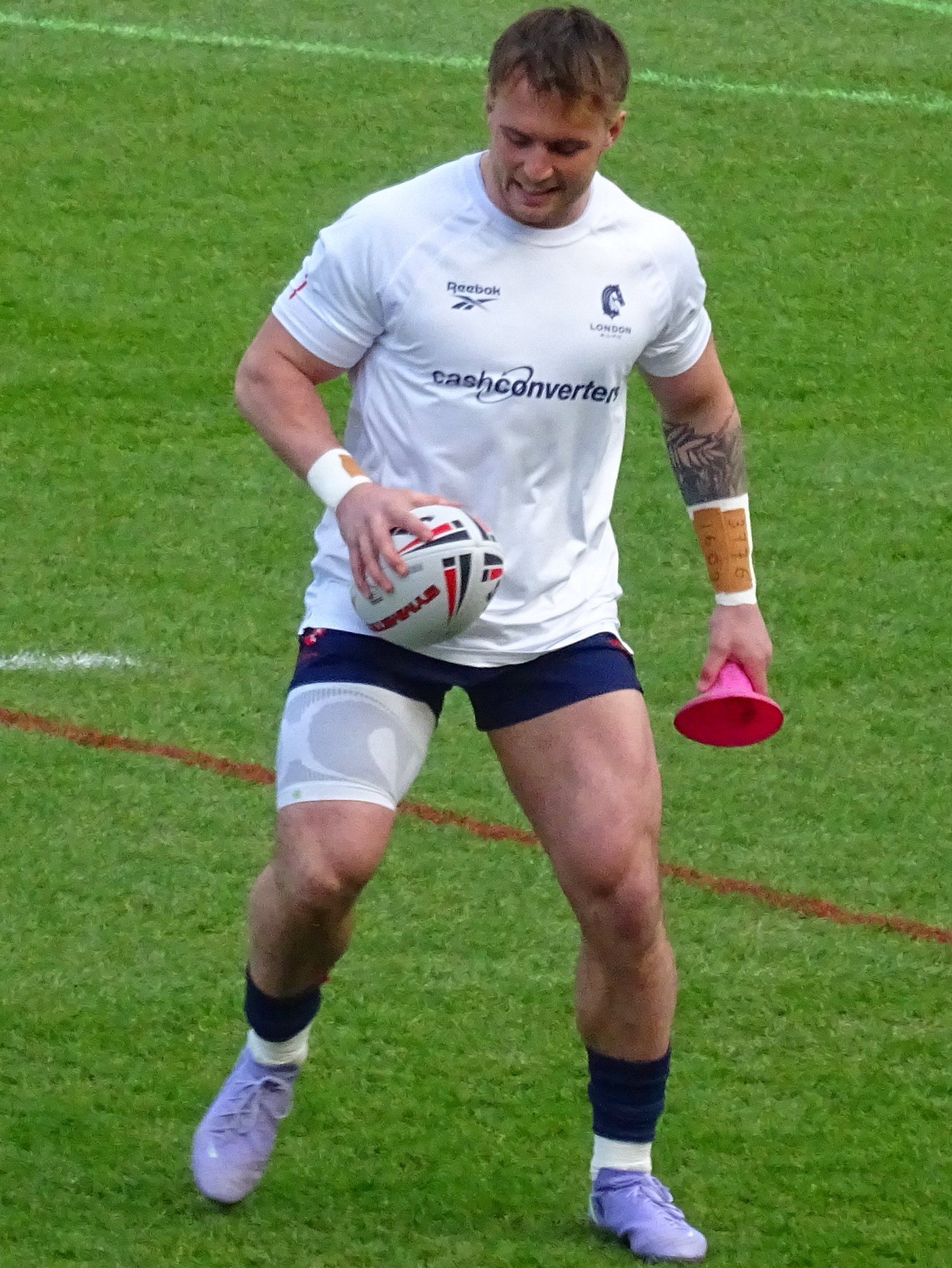
Croft warming up for the London Broncos in 2026

Year	Club	League Competition	Appearances	Tries	Goals	Drop goals	Points	Notes
2019	Wakefield Trinity	2019 Super League	4	1	0	0	4	
2020	Wakefield Trinity	2020 Super League	6	0	0	0	0	
2020	Oldham	2020 RFL Championship	2	0	0	0	0	loan
2021	Wakefield Trinity	2021 Super League	0	0	0	0	0	
2021	Oldham	2021 RFL Championship	2	1	0	0	4	loan
2022	Wakefield Trinity	2022 Super League	8	1	0	0	4	
2022	Barrow Raiders	2022 RFL Championship	3	0	0	0	0	loan
2022	Newcastle Thunder	2022 RFL Championship	6	3	0	0	12	loan
2022	Wynnum Manly Seagulls	2023 Queensland Cup	3	1	0	0	4	
2021	Wakefield Trinity	2023 Super League	9	1	0	0	4	
2024	Wakefield Trinity	2024 RFL Championship	19	5	0	0	20	
2025	Wakefield Trinity	2025 Super League	15	3	0	0	12	
2025	Salford Red Devils	2025 Super League	1	0	0	0	0	loan
2026	London Broncos	2026 RFL Championship	21	4	8	0	32	
Club career total			99	20	8	0	96	
