= Ben Hursey-Hord =

English professional rugby league footballer

Personal information
- Full name: Benjamin Hursey-Hord
- Born: 19 November 2002 (age 24) Maidstone, Kent, England
- Height: 6 ft 0 in (1.83 m)
- Weight: 14 st 13 lb (95 kg)

Playing information
- Position: Second-row, Prop, Loose forward
Club
Years	Team	Pld	T	G	FG	P
2023	Leeds Rhinos	0	0	0	0	0
2023(loan)	→ Halifax Panthers	0	0	0	0	0
2024	Halifax Panthers	10	2	0	0	8
2024(loan)	→ Whitehaven	3	0	0	0	0
2025–	London Broncos	42	12	0	0	48
	Total	55	14	0	0	56
- Source: As of 18 November 2026

Ben Hursey-Hord (born 19 November 2001) is an English professional rugby league footballer who plays as a second-row, prop or loose forward for the London Broncos in the Super League.

He previously played for the Halifax Panthers in the RFL Championship, and spent time on loan from Halifax at Whitehaven in the Championship.

== Background ==
Hursey-Hord was born in Maidstone, Kent, England.

He played for the Invicta Panthers as a junior, joining the club in 2014. He played in the London Origin series whilst at the club.

Hursey-Hord played in the junior system at the London Broncos.

He left the club to attend Leeds Beckett University, and later graduated with a degree in Sports Nutrition.

== Career ==
=== Leeds Rhinos ===
Hursey-Hord joined the Leeds Rhinos in 2022, but was hampered by injuries in his first year at the club. He played all bar one game of their reserves side in 2023.

He spent time on loan from Leeds at the Halifax Panthers towards the end of 2023.

=== Halifax Panthers ===
Hursey-Hord joined Halifax ahead of the 2024 season.

=== Whitehaven ===
He joined Whitehaven on loan from Halifax, playing 3 games in the 2024 RFL Championship.

=== London Broncos ===
In November 2024 it was reported that Hursey-Hord had signed for the London Broncos in the RFL Championship, signing an 12 month deal that would keep him in the capital until the end of 2026.

In August 2026, he was part of the Broncos squad that lifted the RFL Championship Leaders' Shield.

Hursey-Hord was part of the squad for London's 1895 Cup Final victory over the Widnes Vikings at the Halliwell Jones Stadium in August 2026.

In October 2026, he was part of the squad for the Broncos Championship Grand Final victory over Doncaster at Plough Lane.

Hursey-Hord signed a new two year deal with the Broncos which will take him through to the end of the 2028 Super League season.

== Club statistics ==
Year	Club	League Competition	Appearances	Tries	Goals	Drop goals	Points	Notes
2023	Leeds Rhinos	2023 Super League	0	0	0	0	0	
2023	Halifax Panthers	2023 RFL Championship	0	0	0	0	0	loan
2024	Halifax Panthers	2024 RFL Championship	10	2	0	0	8	
2024	Whitehaven	2024 RFL Championship	3	0	0	0	0	loan
2025	London Broncos	2025 RFL Championship	19	2	0	0	8	
2026	London Broncos	2026 RFL Championship	23	10	0	0	40	
Club career total			55	14	0	0	56	
