= Alex Max =

Papua New Guinean professional rugby league footballer

Personal information
- Full name: Alex Max
- Born: 27 February 2002 (age 24) Chimbu Province, Papua New Guinea
- Height: 5 ft 10 in (1.78 m)
- Weight: 14 st 13 lb (95 kg)

Playing information
- Position: Centre
Club
Years	Team	Pld	T	G	FG	P
2024–25	PNG Hunters	38	22	0	0	88
2026	London Broncos	12	17	0	0	68
2027–	PNG Hunters	0	0	0	0	0
	Total	50	39	0	0	156
Representative
Years	Team	Pld	T	G	FG	P
2024–	PNG Prime Minister's XIII	2	1	0	0	4
- Source: As of 20 November 2026

Alex Max is a Papua New Guinean professional rugby league footballer who plays as a centre for the PNG Hunters in the Queensland Cup.

He has previously played for the London Broncos in the RFL Championship. Max has also played for the PNG Prime Minister's XIII at representative level.

== Background ==
Max was born in Chimbu Province, Papua New Guinea. He attended Waghi Valley Secondary School in Jiwaka.

He played for the Bomai Bulldogs in the Kimil Rugby League Competition in 2016.

== Career ==
=== Enga Mioks ===
Max joined the Enga Mioks in 2020 in the Digicell Cup, but COVID-19 hit.

=== Rabaul Gurias ===
He played for the Rabaul Gurias in the Digicell Cup.

=== PNG Hunters ===
Max made his debut in April 2024 for the Papua New Guinea Hunters against the Tweed Seagulls in the Queensland Cup. He played 38 Queensland Cup games for the Hunters, scoring 22 tries between 2024 and 2025.

=== London Broncos ===
He joined the London Broncos ahead of their 2026 RFL Championship season. He scored two tries on his debut and was named as man-of-the match in scoring four tries the following week in the Challenge Cup.

In August 2026, he was part of the Broncos squad that lifted the RFL Championship Leaders' Shield.

In 2026 he was part of the London Broncos squad that secured their historic treble of League Leaders' Shield, 1895 Cup and Grand Final victories.

=== PNG Hunters (re-join) ===
On 20 November 2026 it was reported that he had signed for PNG Hunters in the Queensland Cup

=== Representative career ===
Max made his representative debut for the PNG Prime Minister's XIII in October 2024, scoring a try in their 42–20 defeat to the Australian Prime Minister's XIII. He was once again selected for the fixture the following season.

=== International career ===
Papua New Guinea announced their 23-man 2026 Rugby League World Cup squad on 6 October 2026, with Max named as a shadow player. Max was called into the Kumuls World Cup squad during the tournament, and was named on the bench for the match against England.

== Club statistics ==
Year	Club	League Competition	Appearances	Tries	Goals	Drop goals	Points	Notes
2024	PNG Hunters	2024 Queensland Cup	17	13	0	0	52	
2025	PNG Hunters	2025 Queensland Cup	21	9	0	0	36	
2026	London Broncos	2026 RFL Championship	12	17	0	0	68	
2027	PNG Hunters	2027 Queensland Cup						
Club career total			50	39	0	0	156	
