= Robert Oakley =

Robert Oakley may refer to:

- Robert B. Oakley (1931–2014), American diplomat
- Robert McKeeman Oakley (1871–1927), Australian public servant
- Rob Oakley (rugby league) (born 1999), Scotland international rugby league footballer
