= Rob Oakley (rugby league) =

Scotland International rugby league footballer

Personal information
- Full name: Robert Oakley
- Born: 9 November 1999 (age 27) Colchester, Essex, England

Playing information
- Position: Loose forward, Second-row, Hooker
Club
Years	Team	Pld	T	G	FG	P
2021–22	London Broncos	22	0	0	0	0
2021(loan)	→ London Skolars	2	2	0	0	8
2022(loan)	→ London Skolars	2	0	0	0	0
2025–	London Broncos	2	0	0	0	0
	Total	28	2	0	0	8
Representative
Years	Team	Pld	T	G	FG	P
2021	Scotland	1	0	0	0	0
- Source: As of 6 September 2026

Rob Oakley (born 8 November 1999) is a Scotland international rugby league footballer who plays as a loose forward, second-row or hooker for the London Broncos in the Super League.

He has spent time on loan from the Broncos at the London Skolars in League 1.

== Background ==
Oakley was born in Colchester, Essex, England. He is of Scottish heritage.

He played for the Eastern Rhinos as a junior. He played for the London Origin side.

Oakley was educated at Colne College and Sigma Sixth.

== Playing career ==
=== Club career ===
Oakley progressed through the London Broncos academy and reserves sides. He was promoted to the first team squad ahead of the 2021 season.

He made his professional debut for the London Broncos in June 2021 against Whitehaven.

Oakley spent time on loan from the Broncos at the Skolars in League 1 in both 2021 and 2022.

He signed a new contract with the Broncos at the end of the 2021 season.

On 27 March 2023 it was announced that he had been banned from all sport for three years for the use of four prohibited substances by UK Anti-Doping following a positive sample from an out-of-competition test on 14 June 2022.

In August 2026, he was part of the Broncos squad that lifted the RFL Championship Leaders' Shield.

In 2026 he was part of the London Broncos squad that secured their historic treble of League Leaders' Shield, 1895 Cup and Grand Final victories.

=== International career ===
Oakley was called up to the Scotland squad for the first time in October 2021. He made his international debut for the Bravehearts against Jamaica.

He was not selected in the final Scotland squad for the 2021 Rugby League World Cup.
