= RFL Championship Leaders' Shield =

- Country: England; France
- Presented by: RFL Championship

History
- First award: 2003
- Most wins: Featherstone Rovers; Leigh Centurions (5 titles)
- Most recent: London Broncos (1st title)

The RFL Championship Leaders' Shield is a shield awarded to the team finishing the season top of Championship in the sport of rugby league football. Currently the Shield is awarded to the team finishing top of the Championship at the end of the regular season. The Championship play-offs determine the league Champions and promotion to Super League.

== History ==
Since the formation of the Championship in 2003, the team finishing top of the league have been awarded the League Leaders' Shield before entering the playoffs to decide the Champions. Between 2015 and 2018 the league leaders were awarded the Championship title before The Qualifiers began. From 2019 the league reverted to a playoff series and the shield was awarded before the playoffs again.

== Results ==
Year	League leaders	Pts (Note: Shield winners decided by win percentage in 2020 rather than points)	Runners up	Pts	Ref
2003	Salford Red Devils	30	Leigh Centurions	30	
2004	Leigh Centurions	28	Whitehaven	28	
2005	Whitehaven	32	Castleford Tigers	30	
2006	Hull KR	32	Widnes Vikings	28	
2007	Castleford Tigers	51	Widnes Vikings	50	
2008	Salford Red Devils	44	Celtic Crusaders	40	
2009	Barrow Raiders	44	Halifax	43	
2010	Featherstone Rovers	56	Halifax	50	
2011	Featherstone Rovers	56	Leigh Centurions	53	
2012	Featherstone Rovers	47	Leigh Centurions	44	
2013	Featherstone Rovers	70	Sheffield Eagles	67	
2014	Leigh Centurions	76	Featherstone Rovers	61	
2015	Leigh Centurions	43	Bradford Bulls	37	
2016	Leigh Centurions	43	London Broncos	34	
2017	Hull Kingston Rovers	39	London Broncos	36	
2018	Toronto Wolfpack	41	London Broncos	33	
2019	Toronto Wolfpack	52	Toulouse Olympique	47	
2020	Competition abandoned due to the COVID-19 pandemic				
2021	Toulouse Olympique	100.00	Featherstone Rovers	90.48	
2022	Leigh Centurions	50	Featherstone Rovers	47	
2023	Featherstone Rovers	50	Toulouse Olympique	38	
2024	Wakefield Trinity	50	Toulouse Olympique	37	
2025	York Knights	40	Toulouse Olympique	38	
2026	London Broncos	46	Newcastle Thunder	42	

=== Winners ===
	Club	Wins	Runners up	Winning years
1	Featherstone Rovers	5	3	2010, 2011, 2012, 2013, 2023
1	Leigh Centurions	5	3	2004, 2014, 2015, 2016, 2022
3	Salford Red Devils	2	0	2004, 2008
3	Hull Kingston Rovers	2	0	2006, 2017
3	Toronto Wolfpack	2	0	2018, 2019
6	Toulouse Olympique	1	4	2021
7	Whitehaven	1	0	2005
7	Castleford Tigers	1	0	2007
9	Barrow Raiders	1	0	2009
9	Wakefield Trinity	1	0	2024
9	York Knights	1	0	2025
9	London Broncos	1	3	2026

== See also ==
- League Leaders' Shield
- Championship Grand Final
