= 1997 Halifax Blue Sox season =

- Super League II Rank: 7th
- Play-off result: Premiership Trophy preliminary
- Challenge Cup: Fifth round
- 1997 record: Wins: 9; draws: 2; losses: 14
- Points scored: For: 581; against: 609

Team information
- Coach: John Pendlebury
- Stadium: Thrum Hall
← 1996	List of seasons	1998 →

The 1997 Halifax Blue Sox season was the 102nd season in the club's rugby league history and the second season in the Super League. Coached by John Pendlebury, the Halifax Blue Sox competed in Super League II and finished in 7th place. The club also reached the fifth round of the Challenge Cup.

== Table ==
Pos	Team	Pld	W	D	L	PF	PA	PD	Pts	Relegation
1	Bradford Bulls (C)	22	20	0	2	769	397	+372	40	
2	London Broncos	22	15	3	4	616	418	+198	33	
3	St Helens	22	14	1	7	592	506	+86	29	
4	Wigan	22	14	0	8	683	398	+285	28	
5	Leeds Rhinos	22	13	1	8	544	463	+81	27	
6	Salford Reds	22	11	0	11	428	495	−67	22	
7	Halifax Blue Sox	22	8	2	12	524	549	−25	18	
8	Sheffield Eagles	22	9	0	13	415	574	−159	18	
9	Warrington Wolves	22	8	0	14	437	647	−210	16	
10	Castleford Tigers	22	5	2	15	334	515	−181	12	
11	Paris Saint-Germain	22	6	0	16	362	572	−210	12	
12	Oldham Bears (R)	22	4	1	17	461	631	−170	9	Relegated to Division One

Source: Rugby League Project
Rules for classification: 1) Points; 2) Points difference; 3) Number of points scored;
(C) Champions; (R) Relegated

== Squad ==
No	Player
1	Mike Umaga
2	Greg Clarke
3	John Schuster
4	Asa Amone
5	Damian Munro
6	Martin Pearson
8	Karl Harrison
9	Paul Rowley
11	Paul Highton
12	Simon Baldwin
13	Martin Moana
14	Craig Dean
15	Daio Powell
16	Mark Perrett
17	Wayne Jackson
18	Johnny Brewer
19	David Bouveng
20	Kelvin Skerrett
21	Michael Jackson
22	Carl Gillespie
23	Fereti Tuilagi
24	Chris Chester
25	Michael Slicker
26	Richard Marshall
28	David Bastian
29	Brendon Greenwood
30	James Rushforth (rugby league)
32	Danny Seal
33	Alan Boothroyd
34	Kevin O'Loughlin
37	Éric Anselme
