= 1996 Halifax Blue Sox season =

- Super League I Rank: 6th
- Challenge Cup: Quarter-final
- 1996 record: Wins: 12; draws: 1; losses: 12
- Points scored: For: 733; against: 637

Team information
- Coach: Steve Simms
- Stadium: Thrum Hall
List of seasons	1997 →

The 1996 Halifax Blue Sox season was the club's first season in the Super League. Coached by Steve Simms, the Halifax Blue Sox competed in Super League I and finished in 6th place. The club also reached the quarter-final of the Challenge Cup.

== Table ==
Super League I
Pos	Team	Pld	W	D	L	PF	PA	PD	Pts	Qualification or relegation
1	St Helens (C)	22	20	0	2	950	455	+495	40	Qualified for Premiership semi final
2	Wigan	22	19	1	2	902	326	+576	39	Qualified for Premiership semi final
3	Bradford Bulls	22	17	0	5	767	409	+358	34	Qualified for Premiership semi final
4	London Broncos	22	12	1	9	611	462	+149	25	Qualified for Premiership semi final
5	Warrington Wolves	22	12	0	10	569	565	+4	24	
6	Halifax Blue Sox	22	10	1	11	667	576	+91	21	
7	Sheffield Eagles	22	10	0	12	599	730	−131	20	
8	Oldham Bears	22	9	1	12	473	681	−208	19	
9	Castleford Tigers	22	9	0	13	548	599	−51	18	
10	Leeds	22	6	0	16	555	745	−190	12	
11	Paris Saint-Germain	22	3	1	18	398	795	−397	7	
12	Workington Town (R)	22	2	1	19	325	1021	−696	5	Relegated to Division One

Source: Rugby League Project
Rules for classification: 1) Points; 2) Points difference; 3) Number of points scored;
(C) Champions; (R) Relegated

== Squad ==
Statistics include appearances and points in the Super League and Challenge Cup.

Player	Apps	Tries	Goals	DGs	Points
Asa Amone	25	8	0	0	32
Paul Anderson	9	2	0	0	8
Simon Baldwin	22	10	0	0	40
David Bastian	2	0	0	0	0
John Bentley	21	22	0	0	88
Johnny Brewer	6	2	0	0	8
Carl Briggs	8	1	0	0	4
Chris Chester	10	0	0	0	0
Craig Dean	19	10	0	0	40
Abi Ekoku	16	5	0	0	20
St John Ellis	2	1	0	0	4
Carl Gillespie	20	3	0	0	12
Brandon Greenwood	1	0	0	0	0
Graeme Hallas	15	5	0	0	20
Karl Harrison	21	0	0	0	0
Paul Highton	15	2	0	0	8
Michael Jackson	15	3	0	0	12
Wayne Jackson	7	1	0	0	4
Andy James	4	0	0	0	0
Martin Ketteridge	14	0	0	0	0
Oliver Marns	1	0	0	0	0
Richard Marshall	7	0	0	0	0
Mick Martindale	4	0	0	0	0
Martin Moana	19	9	0	0	36
Paul Moriarty	5	0	0	0	0
Damian Munro	3	2	0	0	8
Wayne Parker	6	0	0	0	0
Mark Perrett	18	4	0	0	16
Mark Preston	1	0	0	0	0
Craig Rika	2	0	0	0	0
Paul Rowley	24	5	0	1	21
John Schuster	23	8	111	2	256
Danny Seal	7	1	0	0	4
Roy Southernwood	2	0	0	0	0
Fereti Tuilagi	21	6	0	0	24
Mike Umaga	21	13	8	0	68

== Transfers ==
=== In ===
Player	From	Fee	Date	Ref
Brandon Greenwood	Hull F.C.		January 1996	
Johnny Brewer	Parramatta		July 1996	
Martin Pearson	Featherstone Rovers		December 1996	
Daio Powell	Wakefield Trinity		December 1996	

=== Out ===
Player	Pos	Fee	Date	Ref
Grant Anderson	Castleford Tigers		February 1996	
Mick Martindale	Wakefield Trinity		November 1996	
Craig Rika	Wakefield Trinity		November 1996	
