= List of Salford RLFC coaches =

This list of Salford RLFC coaches details the records and achievements of coaches at the club.

Salford Rugby League Football Club currently play in the RFL Championship, a rugby league football competition. Known as Salford Rugby League until 1996 when they became Salford Reds and from 1999 to 2013 they were known as Salford City Reds. The name change to Salford Red Devils took place at the end of 2013, and was inspired by a nickname the club had in the 1930s when they toured France.

== Coaches ==
This list shows the coaches who have been in charge at Salford since the 1920s, exact dates are listed where possible.

Win percentage is rounded to one decimal place. The names of any caretaker coaches are supplied where known, and these periods are highlighted in italics.

Key

M: Matches played W: Matches won D: Matches drawn L: Matches lost

Name	From	To	M	W	D	L	Win%	Honours and achievements	Notes
James Lomas	1920	1928							
Lance Todd	1928	1940	525	364	32	128	69	Lancashire Cup 1931–32, 1934–35, 1935–36, 1936–37; Lancashire League 1932–33, 1933–34, 1934–35, 1936–37, 1938–39; Championship Champions 1932–33, 1936–37, 1938–39; Challenge Cup 1937–38	Most Successful Salford Coach
Gus Risman	1954	1958							
George Parsons	1960	1963	117	36	4	77	31		
Ted Cahill	1963	1964	36	9	0	27	25		
Griff Jenkins	1964	1970							
Cliff Evans	1970	December 1973							
Les Bettinson	December 1973	March 1977						Lancashire Cup 1972–73; Championship Champions 73–74; 1975–76; BBC2 Floodlit Trophy 1974–75	
Colin Dixon	March 1977	January 1978	31	19	0	12	61		
Stan McCormick	February 1978	March 1978							
Alex Murphy	May 1978	November 1980	93	44	5	44	47		
Kevin Ashcroft	November 1980	March 1982	48	24	1	23	50		
Alan McInnes	March 1982	May 1982							
Malcolm Aspey	May 1982	October 1983	47	29	0	18	62		
Mike Coulman	October 1983	May 1984	26	5	0	21	19		
Kevin Ashcroft	May 1984	October 1989	175	85	3	87	49		
Kevin Tamati	October 1989	July 1993						Second Division Champions 1990–91	
Garry Jack	July 1993	March 1995	61	29	2	30	48		
Andy Gregory	March 1995	May 1999						Second Division Champions 1995–96 & First Division Champions 1996	Coach during name change to Salford Reds
John Harvey	June 1999	22 July 2001	58	16	1	41	28		Coach during name change to Salford City Reds
Steve McCormack	22 July 2001	22 May 2002	20	3	0	17	15		
Karl Harrison	June 2002	22 May 2007						NL One Champions 2003, Northern Rail Cup 2003	
Steve Simms	23 May 2007	10 June 2007							
Shaun McRae	11 June 2007	29 April 2011	18	3	0	15	17	NL One Champions 2008, Northern Rail Cup 2008	
Phil Veivers	29 April 2011	July 2011							
Matt Parish	July 2011	17 November 2011	6	1	0	5	17		Coached last Salford match at The Willows
Phil Veivers	23 November 2011	3 March 2013	50	17	1	32	34		Coached first match at AJ Bell Stadium
Alan Hunte	March 2013	12 April 2013	8	2	1	5	25		
Brian Noble	13 April 2013	4 April 2014	23	7	0	16	30		Coach during name change to Salford Red Devils
Iestyn Harris	4 April 2014	September 2015	21	8	1	12	38		
Ian Watson	September 2015	19 November 2020	164	80	0	84	49	2019 Super League Grand Final defeat to St Helens; 2020 Challenge Cup Final defeat to Leeds Rhinos	
Richard Marshall	19 November 2020	22 September 2021	22	7	0	15	32		
Paul Rowley	22 September 2021	Incumbent	57	29	0	28	51		
