= Dave Highton =

English rugby league footballer

Personal information
- Full name: David Highton
- Born: 31 January 1980 (age 45) Billinge, Merseyside, England

Playing information
- Height: 5 ft 9 in (1.75 m)
- Weight: 13 st 4 lb (84 kg)
- Position: Hooker
Club
Years	Team	Pld	T	G	FG	P
1998–01	Warrington Wolves	37	2	0	0	8
2002–03	Salford City Reds	45	1	0	0	4
2004–05	London Broncos	48	2	0	0	8
2006	Halifax	0	0	0	0	0
	Total	130	5	0	0	20

Dave Highton (born 31 January 1980) is a former professional rugby league footballer who played as a hooker for the Warrington Wolves, Salford City Reds and the London Broncos in the European Super League. He signed for Halifax to play in National League One, but injury forced him to retire aged just 25.

Whilst at Warrington he was given a 10 month ban for steroid use for which he was sacked by the Wolves. He was later given a chance to resurrect his career at Salford.

His elder brothers Paul Highton and Chris Highton also played professional rugby league, with Paul playing for Wales at international level and Chris featuring for Warrington and the Swinton Lions.
