= Mick Slicker =

Irish rugby league player (born 1978)

Michael Slicker
Personal information
- Full name: Michael Slicker
- Born: 16 August 1978 (age 47) Oldham, Greater Manchester, England

Playing information
- Position: Prop
Club
| Years | Team | Pld | T | G | FG | P |
|---|---|---|---|---|---|---|
| 1995–97 | Halifax |
| 1999 | Sheffield Eagles | 3 | 1 | 0 | 0 | 4 |
| 2000–01 | Keighley Cougars | 42 | 1 | 0 | 0 | 4 |
| 2001–05 | Huddersfield Giants | 99 | 6 | 0 | 0 | 24 |
| | Total | 144 | 8 | 0 | 0 | 32 |
Representative
| Years | Team | Pld | T | G | FG | P |
| 2001–03 | Ireland | 3 | 0 | 0 | 0 | 0 |

Michael Slicker (born 16 August 1978) is a former professional rugby league footballer who played in the 1990s and 2000s. He played at representative level for Ireland, and at club level for Halifax, the Sheffield Eagles, the Keighley Cougars and the Huddersfield Giants, as a prop.

== Playing career ==
Slicker signed for Huddersfield Giants in May 2001. He was forced to retire from rugby league in 2005 due to persistent knee problems, aged 26.

Slicker won two caps (plus one as a substitute) for Ireland in 2001–2003 while at Huddersfield Giants.

== Personal life ==
Michael has 2 daughters, Megan and Brogan and a wife called Kelly. They currently live in Oldham.
