= Simon Baldwin =

England international rugby league footballer

Personal information
- Born: 31 March 1975 (age 50) England

Playing information
- Position: Prop, Second-row
Club
Years	Team	Pld	T	G	FG	P
1992–94	Leigh		11	11	0	66
1994–98	Halifax		28	0	1	329
1999–99	Sheffield Eagles	22	2	0	0	8
2000–02	Leigh Centurions	6	1	0	0	4
2003–06	Salford City Reds	55	5	0	0	20
2007	Rochdale Hornets	1	0	0	0	0
2008	Oldham	2	0	0	0	0
	Total	86	47	11	1	427
Representative
Years	Team	Pld	T	G	FG	P
1995	Great Britain U-21	1
1995	England	2	0	0	0	0

Simon Baldwin (born 31 March 1975) is an English former professional rugby league footballer who played in the 1990s and 2000s who played as a prop, or second-row.

Baldwin started his career at Leigh before joining Halifax Blue Sox in October 1994. He then spent a season with Sheffield Eagles in 1999. After a second spell at Leigh, he joined Salford City Reds in 2003. He left the club in 2006, and went on to play for Rochdale Hornets and Oldham.

While at Halifax, he also represented Great Britain under-21s, and England in 1995.
