= Harry Goldsmith =

New Zealand rugby league footballer

Personal information
- Born: Napier, New Zealand

Playing information
- Position: Forward
Club
Years	Team	Pld	T	G	FG	P
1912–>14	Salford	95	4	0		12

Harry Goldsmith was a New Zealand professional rugby league footballer who played in the 1910s. He played for Salford as a forward.

== Playing career ==
Goldsmith made his début for Salford at The Willows on Saturday 14 September 1912. He was then second overseas player to appear for the club, after New Zealander Joseph Lavery in 1910.

Goldsmith played in Salford's 5-3 victory over Huddersfield in the Championship Final during the 1913–14 season, he went on to play in 95 games for Salford.
