= Ronald James (rugby) =

Welsh rugby footballer

Ron James
Personal information
- Full name: Ronald James
- Born: 5 February 1938 (age 88) Ystalyfera, Wales

Playing information

Rugby union
- Position: Fullback
Club
Years	Team	Pld	T	G	FG	P
≤1960–≤60	Ystalyfera RFC
≤1960–60	Maesteg RFC
	Total	0	0	0	0	0

Rugby league
- Position: Fullback
Club
Years	Team	Pld	T	G	FG	P
1960–72	Halifax	372	45	1028	0	2191
Representative
Years	Team	Pld	T	G	FG	P
1965	Commonwealth XIII	1	0	2	0	4
1965	Other Nationalities	1	1	0	0	3

Ronald "Ron"/"Ronnie" James (born 5 February 1938) is a Welsh former rugby union and professional rugby league footballer who played in the 1950s, 1960s and 1970s. He played club level rugby union for Ystalyfera RFC and Maesteg RFC as a fullback, at representative level rugby league for Other Nationalities and Commonwealth XIII, and at club level for Halifax as a fullback.

== Playing career ==
=== International honours ===
Ron James represented Other Nationalities (RL) while at Halifax, he played fullback in the 2–19 defeat by St. Helens at Knowsley Road, St. Helens on Wednesday 27 January 1965, to mark the switching-on of new floodlights. and represented Commonwealth XIII (RL) while at Halifax in the 7–15 defeat by New Zealand at Crystal Palace National Recreation Centre, London on Wednesday 18 August 1965.

=== Championship final appearances ===
Ron James played in Halifax's 15–7 victory over St. Helens in the 1964–65 Championship Final during the 1964–65 season at Station Road, Swinton on Saturday 22 May 1965.

=== County Cup Final appearances ===
Ron James played fullback, and scored two goals in Halifax's 10–0 victory over Featherstone Rovers in the 1963–64 Yorkshire Cup Final during the 1963–64 season at Belle Vue, Wakefield on Saturday 2 November 1963.

=== Career Records ===
Ron James holds Halifax's "Most Career Points" record with 2191 points, and is one of less than ten Welshmen to have scored more than 2000-points in their rugby league career.

== Testimonial match ==
Ron James' Testimonial match at Halifax took place in 1971.

== Honoured at Halifax RLFC ==
Ron James is a Halifax RLFC Hall Of Fame Inductee.
