= Paul Highton =

Wales international rugby league footballer

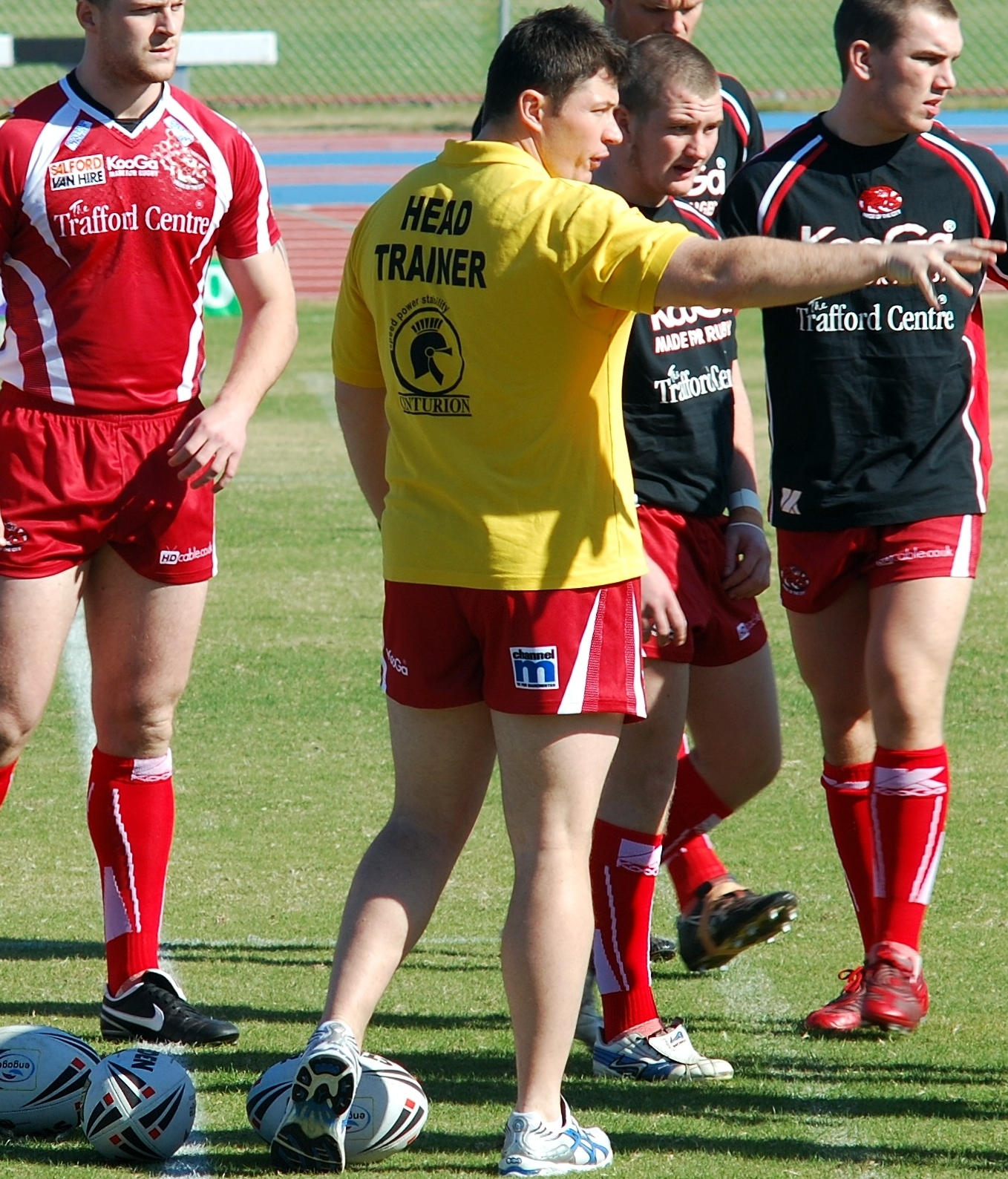

Personal information
- Full name: Paul Highton
- Born: 10 November 1976 (age 49) Oldham, Greater Manchester, England

Playing information
- Position: Prop, Second-row, Loose forward
Club
Years	Team	Pld	T	G	FG	P
1994–97	Halifax	30	9	0	0	36
1998	Featherstone Rovers	4	0	0	0	0
1998–08	Salford City Reds	211	17	0	0	68
2009	Oldham	10	1	0	0	4
	Total	255	27	0	0	108
Representative
Years	Team	Pld	T	G	FG	P
1999–02	Wales	9	0	0	0	0

Paul Highton (born 10 November 1976) is a former Wales international rugby league footballer who played in the 1990s and 2000s. He played at representative level for Great Britain (Academy), and Wales, and at club level for Waterhead A.R.L.F.C. (in Oldham), Halifax/Halifax Blue Sox, Featherstone Rovers, Salford City Reds and Oldham, as a prop, second-row or loose forward.

== Background ==
Highton was born in Oldham, Greater Manchester, England, and he is the older brother of the rugby league hooker who played in the 1990s and 2000s for the Warrington Wolves, and the Swinton Lions; Christopher "Chris" Highton (born 11 January 1978 (age 48)), and the rugby league fullback, hooker or loose forward who played in the 1990s and 2000s for the Warrington Wolves, the Salford City Reds, and the London Broncos; David "Dave" Highton (born 31 January 1980 (age 45)).

== Playing career ==
Highton played for Waterhead ARLFC prior to turning professional at Halifax in the 1994–95 season, he represented the Great Britain (Academy) on the 1996 tour down-under, he made his début for Featherstone Rovers on 5 April 1998, and he played his last match for Featherstone Rovers during the 1998–season, he joined Salford in 1998 after he had played 4 matches for Featherstone Rovers, Paul was to spend the rest of his Career with the Salford club being awarded a testimonial by both club and governing body the RFL for his services to the game

He signed for the Salford City Reds in 1998 having also played for Featherstone Rovers, and represented Wales in the 2000 Rugby League World Cup.

== Post playing ==
Highton retired in 2009 and went on to become the clubs Football / Player Welfare Manager. Since retiring, Highton has aligned himself to numerous charities taking up both educational, and ambassadorial roles namely The Sporting Chance Clinic, State of Mind and RLCares. Highton's involvement with RLCares has recently (2016) seen him take on the Challenge of Cycling 3000 miles from Londons Olympic Stadium to the opening Ceremony of the Rio Olympics in Rio de Janeiro. His Epic challenge saw him travel through France, Spain and Portugal before flying over to Recife in Northern Brazil and then cycling the final 1700-miles down the coast to Rio de Janeiro. Highton also continues his involvement with rugby league with his weekly commentary, and summarising on the Super League with BBC Radio Manchester.
