= John Wilkinson (entrepreneur) =

English businessman and rugby league executive

John Wilkinson OBE
- Born: Walkden, Lancashire, England
- Occupations: Businessman; chairman of Salford RLFC
- Known for: Longest-serving chairman of Salford RLFC
- Title: Chairman of Salford RLFC
- Term: 1982–2013
- Successor: Dr Marwan Koukash

Dr John Wilkinson OBE was chairman of Salford RLFC between 1982 and 2013. He was born in Walkden, Lancashire.

He was given an OBE in 2005 for Services to the City of Salford and is also a Trustee of the Salfordian Hotel in Southport.

Wilkinson has also been given the Nickname of 'Mr Salford' due to his pride for the city he grew up in. In 2009 Wilkinson received a Dr of Letters at the Lowry, Salford Quays.

A 25th Anniversary celebrating John Wilkinson's time at the club was arranged for the Super League game between Salford and Harlequins RL on 15 June 2007. He remained chairman of the club for 31 years until 2013, which remained the longest chairmanship of any major sports team around the world until 2017 when overtaken by FC Porto's Pinto da Costa.

Upon selling the club to Dr Marwan Koukash in 2013, he now continues to live in Salford with his family and still is an active chairman of his other businesses.
