= Damian Munro =

Ireland international rugby league footballer

Personal information
- Full name: Damian Munro
- Born: 6 October 1976 (age 48)

Playing information
- Position: Fullback, Wing, Centre
Club
Years	Team	Pld	T	G	FG	P
1994–98	Halifax
1998–2002	Widnes Vikings	128	76	1	0	305
2002	Featherstone Rovers	4	6	0	0	24
2003–04	Leigh Centurions	49	42	0	0	168
2005–08	Oldham RLFC	17	12	0	0	48
2008	Halifax
2010	Blackpool Panthers
	Total	198	136	1	0	545
Representative
Years	Team	Pld	T	G	FG	P
2001	Ireland	1
- Source: As of 7 May 2024

Damian Munro (born 6 October 1976) is a former professional rugby league footballer who played in the 1990s, 2000s and 2010s. He played at representative level for Ireland, and at club level for Halifax (two spells), the Widnes Vikings, Leigh Centurions, Oldham RLFC, and the Blackpool Panthers, playing as a fullback, wing, or centre.

== Playing career ==
=== International honours ===
Damian Munro won a cap for Ireland while at Widnes Vikings 1999 1-cap (sub).

=== Club career ===
Damian Munro went from Halifax to Widnes Vikings along with Kevin O'Loughlin, in the deal that took Jamie Bloem from Widnes Vikings to Halifax.
