= Daio Powell =

Wales international rugby league footballer

Personal information
- Full name: Daio Powell
- Born: 9 March 1973 (age 53) Leeds, England

Playing information
- Position: Wing, Centre
Club
Years	Team	Pld	T	G	FG	P
1991–94	Bradford Northern	28	12	0	0	48
1994–95	Wakefield Trinity	22	7	0	0	28
1995	Western Reds	1	0	0	0	0
1997–98	Halifax	42	18	0	0	72
1999	Sheffield Eagles	15	2	0	0	8
2000	Sheffield Eagles
2001	Keighley Cougars	8	0	0	0	0
	Total	116	39	0	0	156
Representative
Years	Team	Pld	T	G	FG	P
1994	Wales	2	1	0	0	4

Daio Powell (born 9 March 1973) is an English former professional rugby league footballer who played in the 1990s and 2000s. He played at representative level for Wales, and at club level for Bradford Northern, Wakefield Trinity, Western Reds, Halifax, Sheffield Eagles, and the Keighley Cougars, as a wing, or centre.

== Background ==
Powell was born in Leeds, West Riding of Yorkshire, England.

A Welsh international winger/centre, Powell’s stint with the Western Reds was marked by tragedy: Powell was charged with manslaughter after a man he punched in the face outside a Perth nightclub in July 1995 died, having struck the back of his head on the footpath. “I just want to say I’m sorry,” Powell said in August 1996 after being found not guilty, with the death deemed an accident by a jury.

== International honours ==
Daio Powell won two caps for Wales while at Bradford Northern in 1994.
