= Karl Harrison =

England rugby league footballer and coach (born 1964)

Personal information
- Born: 20 February 1964 (age 61) Leeds, England

Playing information
- Position: Prop
Club
Years	Team	Pld	T	G	FG	P
1983–85	Bramley	72	10	0	0	38
1985–89	Featherstone Rovers	111	15	0	0	60
1989–91	Hull FC	59	6	0	0	24
1991–98	Halifax	203	13	0	0	52
1999	Hull FC	27	2	0	0	8
	Total	472	46	0	0	182
Representative
Years	Team	Pld	T	G	FG	P
1990–94	Great Britain	14	0	0	0	0
1995–96	England	6	0	0	0	0

Coaching information
Club
Years	Team	Gms	W	D	L	W%
2000	Keighley Cougars
2002–07	Salford City Reds	99	42	4	53	42
2009–11	Batley Bulldogs	5	2	0	3	40
2012–14	Halifax	6	3	0	3	50
	Total	110	47	4	59	43
Representative
Years	Team	Gms	W	D	L	W%
2004–06	England	3	3	0	0	100
- Relatives: James Harrison (son)

Karl Harrison (born 20 February 1964) is an English former professional rugby league footballer and coach, who played in the 1980s and 1990s, and coached in the 2000s and 2010s. He played at representative level for both Great Britain and England, and at club level for Bramley, Featherstone Rovers, Hull FC (two spells) and Halifax, as a prop. He has coached England, Keighley Cougars, Salford City Reds, Batley Bulldogs and Halifax. Harrison is a Halifax Hall of Fame Inductee.

== Background ==
Harrison was born in Leeds, West Riding of Yorkshire, England. He attended Morley Grammar School, where he began playing rugby union. He is married to Suzanne and they have two sons; Samuel (born September 1992), and James (born June 1995).

== Playing career ==
Karl Harrison started his professional career at Bramley, making his début on 20 March 1983 against Swinton, with his last game coming on 15 December 1985 against Blackpool Borough. He was transferred from Bramley to Featherstone Rovers in 1985, he made his début for Featherstone Rovers on Sunday 22 December 1985 and he played his last match for Featherstone Rovers during the 1988–89 season, he was transferred from Featherstone Rovers to Hull F.C. in 1989, and helped them win the Premiership in 1991. He was reluctantly transferred from Hull F.C. to Halifax a year later in a £100,000 deal. He played for the Point Chevalier Pirates in the Auckland Rugby League competition in the off-season. Harrison played prop, in Hull FC's 14–4 victory over Widnes in the Premiership Final during the 1990–91 season at Old Trafford, Manchester on Sunday 12 May 1991.

He was selected to go on the 1992 Great Britain Lions tour of Australia and New Zealand. He won the last of his 14 Great Britain caps in 1994. Harrison was selected to play for England in the 1995 World Cup Final at prop but Australia won the match, and retained the cup.

== Coaching career ==
Karl Harrison was a coach at Halifax, and then head coach at Keighley before moving to Bradford Bulls, where he worked for two years as an Assistant Coach under Brian Noble. He was appointed as head coach at Salford City Reds in June 2002, replacing Steve McCormack. Although he was unable to prevent Salford City Reds being relegated from Super League in 2002, Harrison remained, and led Salford City Reds to promotion back to the top tier of the sport at the first attempt, winning the Arriva Trains Cup on the way. Harrison claims that he was approached to take part in reality television show, I'm a Celebrity...Get Me Out of Here! in 2004, but turned the opportunity down, citing training commitments at Salford City Reds.

Harrison was also coach of the England team, replacing John Kear, from 2004 until 4 August 2006, when he announced that he would be stepping down from the position. In mid-February 2007, there were suggestions that Harrison could return to a role with the international team, but the Salford City Reds chairman, John Wilkinson denied the rumours. He was the head coach of Salford City Reds rugby league team for five years, before being sacked on 22 May 2007. Following his sacking as Salford coach, Harrison returned to rugby league 18 months later as Senior Scholarship Coach at Huddersfield Giants late in 2008. He became Head Coach of Batley Bulldogs where he was to become a fans' favourite, turning the playing squad around drastically after Gary Thornton's departure. He took Batley to the final of the Northern Rail Cup in 2010, where they beat the favourites, Widnes Vikings. His last season at Batley Bulldogs was 2011 when they finished a creditable 4th in the Cooperative Championship. In 2012 he rejoined Halifax as head coach.
