= Steve Simms =

Australian rugby league coach and sports broadcaster/pundit

Personal information
- Full name: Steven Simms

Playing information
Club
| Years | Team | Pld | T | G | FG | P |
|---|---|---|---|---|---|---|
| 1983–84 | Huyton | 11 | 1 | 0 | 0 | 4 |
| 1984–90 | Runcorn Highfield | 42 | 3 | 0 | 0 | 12 |
| | Total | 53 | 4 | 0 | 0 | 16 |

Coaching information
Club
| Years | Team | Gms | W | D | L | W% |
| 1992–94 | Leigh Centurions | 53 | 12 | 3 | 38 | 23 |
| 1994–96 | Halifax Blue Sox | 75 | 40 | 4 | 31 | 53 |
| 1997–98 | Featherstone Rovers |
| 2007 | Salford City Reds |
| | Total | 128 | 52 | 7 | 69 | 41 |
- As of 1 December 2024

Steve Simms is an Australian former professional rugby league footballer, rugby league coach, rugby league administrator and rugby league commentator. He coached in the 1990s and 2000s, and was an administrator in the 2000s and 2010s.

He coached Leigh, Halifax Blue Sox, Featherstone Rovers and the Salford City Reds.

He was also a co-commentator for the BBC in their coverage of the Challenge Cup.
