= Richard Marshall (rugby league) =

English rugby league coach and former Ireland international rugby league footballer

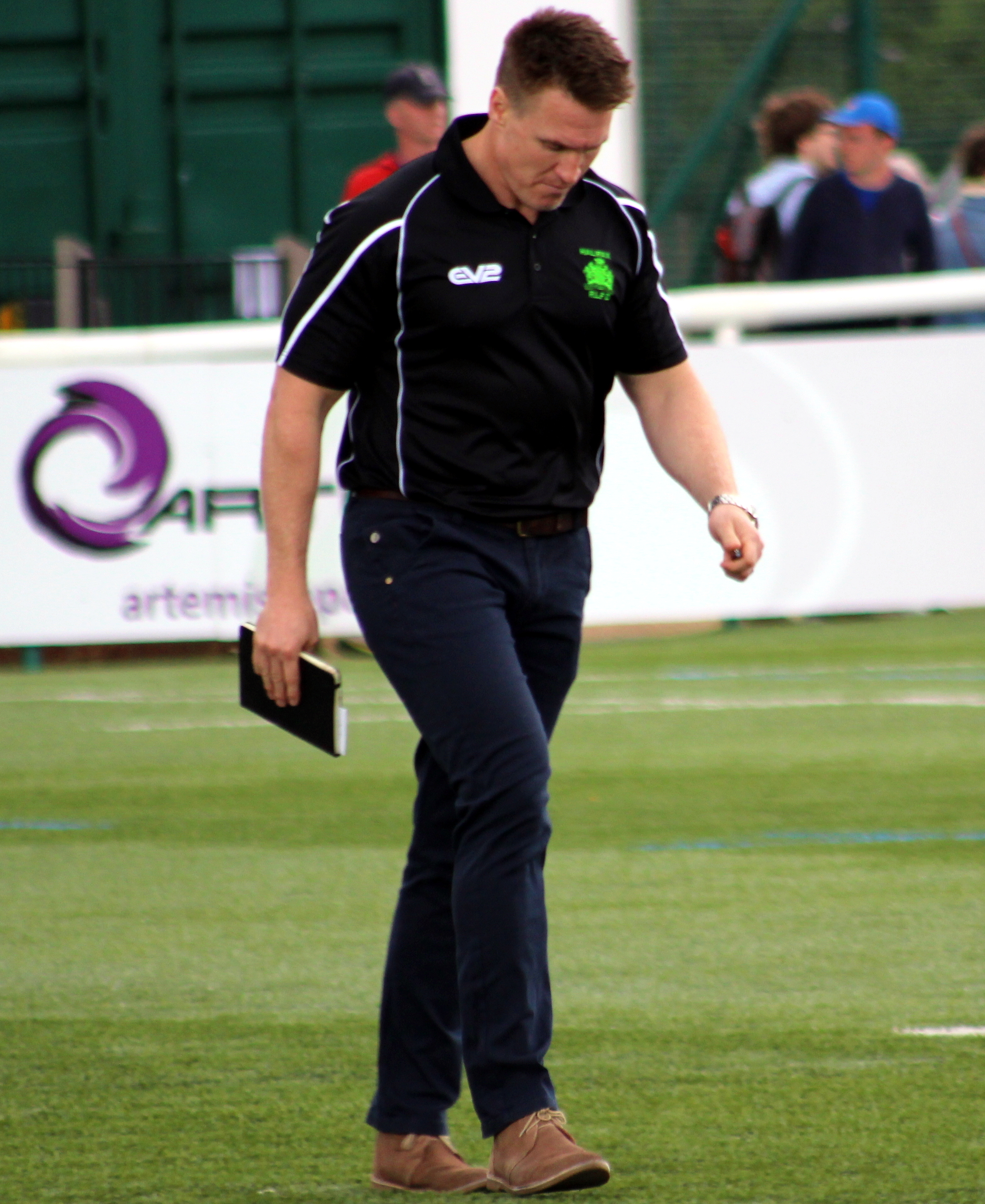

Personal information
- Full name: Richard Marshall
- Born: 9 October 1975 (age 50) Warrington, Cheshire, England

Playing information
- Position: Prop, Second-row
Club
Years	Team	Pld	T	G	FG	P
1996–99	Halifax	81	2	0	0	8
2000–01	Huddersfield Giants	53	1	0	0	4
2002–03	London Broncos	48	1	0	0	4
2004–05	Leigh Centurions	46	2	0	1	9
2006–07	Swinton Lions	32	1	0	0	4
	Total	260	7	0	1	29
Representative
Years	Team	Pld	T	G	FG	P
2003	Ireland	2	0	0	0	0

Coaching information
Club
Years	Team	Gms	W	D	L	W%
2015–19	Halifax	120	63	2	29	53
2021	Salford Red Devils	22	7	0	15	32
	Total	142	70	2	44	49
- Source: As of 22 September 2021

Richard Marshall (born 9 October 1975) is a professional rugby league coach who is an assistant coach at the Warrington Wolves in the Super League.

He has held head coaches positions, most recently the Head Coach of the Salford Red Devils in the Super League. He is a former Ireland international rugby league footballer who played as a prop or second-row forward in the 1990s and 2000s.

== Playing career ==
He is a former professional rugby league footballer who played in the 1990s and 2000s. He played at representative level for Ireland, and at club level for Halifax, Huddersfield Giants, London Broncos, Leigh Centurions and the Swinton Lions

== International honours ==
Marshall won 2 caps for Ireland in 2003 while at the London Broncos.

== Coaching career ==
He is the 2019 and 2020 Grand Final Winning assistant coach for St Helens, and at the end of the 2020 season he was announced as the successor to Ian Watson to take over the head coach role at the Salford Red Devils, after he had left to join the Huddersfield Giants.

On 22 September 2021 it was reported that he had left his role of head coach of Salford Red Devils by mutual consent after the club finished the 2021 Super League season in second last place on the table.
