= Salford RLFC =

British professional rugby league football club

Club information
- Full name: Salford Rugby League Football Club
- Nickname: Red Devils
- Colours: Red, White and Black
- Founded: 1873; 153 years ago (as Salford FC)
- Exited: 2025; 1 year ago
- Readmitted: 2026; 0 years ago (as Salford RLFC)
- Website: Official website

details
- Ground: CorpAcq Stadium (12,000)
- CEO: Ryan Brierley
- Chairman: Malcolm Crompton
- Coach: Dave Hewitt
- Captain: Brad Dwyer
- Competition: Championship
- 2026 season: 12th
- Current season

Uniforms
Home colours	Away colours

Records
- Championships: 6 (1914, 1933, 1937, 1939, 1974, 1976)
- Challenge Cups: 1 (1938)
- Other top-tier honours: 11
- Most capped: 498 – Maurice Richards
- Highest points scorer: 2,907 – David Watkins

Salford RLFC is a semi-professional rugby league club in Salford, England, who play home games at the CorpAcq Stadium in Barton upon Irwell. They are the phoenix club of the original Salford Red Devils who were liquidated in 2025.

They have won the League Championship six times and Challenge Cup once. The club's traditional home colours are red, white and blue.

They have rivalries with Swinton Lions, Leigh Leopards, Oldham and Rochdale Hornets.

== History ==
=== Early years ===
The club was founded in 1873 by the boys of the Cavendish Street Chapel in Hulme, Manchester. Using a local field, the boys organised matches amongst themselves before moving to nearby Moss Side. In an attempt to recruit new members, the link with the school was broken in 1875 and the name Cavendish Football Club was adopted. They moved to a new base on the Salford side of the River Irwell at Throstle Nest Weir in Ordsall. Two seasons later, they moved again to the west side of Trafford Road to a ground known as the Mile Field where they spent the 1877–78 season. Their next home was a field north of the former Manchester Racecourse, New Barnes. Their first season there, 1878–79, was the last to be played under the Cavendish name. Cavendish became Salford Football Club in 1879. The first match as Salford was at Dewsbury on 4 October 1879. The following week heralded the first home match at New Barnes against Widnes, on 11 October 1879. The result was a draw with one try each.

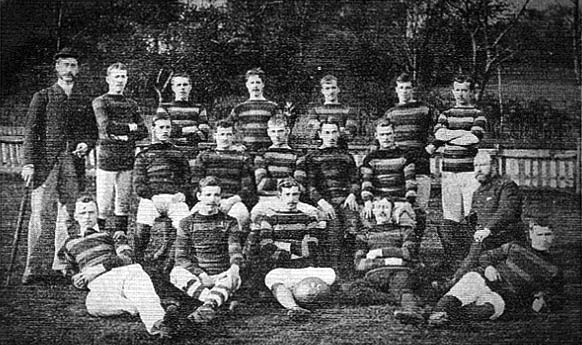
1880–81 team of Salford F.C.

Salford struggled to attract support as there were few local players in the team. In 1881, they almost disbanded but instead merged with the Crescent Football Club. This placed Salford firmly on the rugby map, it was an exciting period and, during the remaining 15 years as members of the Rugby Football Union, seventeen Salford players were selected for Lancashire, three by the North of England and two, Harry Eagles and Tom Kent, for England. Since the 1881 merger, only 62 matches were lost from 263 played in the remaining nine years of the decade. In 1889, Salford moved their headquarters to the nearby London and North Western Hotel on Cross Lane. Salford switched from their traditional amber, black and scarlet hoops to red jerseys. The club became the first side to win the Lancashire League in 1892–93. Salford along with Leigh and Wigan, were suspended for professionalism by the Rugby Football Union in 1895, and placed joint bottom of the Lancashire league. With automatic promotion and relegation, they faced dropping down a division, and potential financial ruin. That same year, the leading Lancashire and Yorkshire clubs formed the breakaway Northern Union, Salford initially remained loyal to the Rugby Football Union but in April 1896 Salford held a special meeting to discuss joining the new organisation. Only three members opposed the motion.

Salford were admitted to the Northern Union on 2 June 1896. Their first competitive Northern Union match was on Saturday, 5 September 1896, with a visit to Widnes. The Reds, competing in the Lancashire Senior Competition, lost 10–0, and only three matches were won in the League that season. Their form improved and they finished third place in 1898–99. In 1900, Salford met old local rivals, Swinton, in the Rugby League Challenge Cup Final at Fallowfield, Manchester. After a keenly fought contest, the result was a 16–8 win for Swinton.

=== 20th century ===
In 1900, Salford received notice to vacate New Barnes as the Manchester Ship Canal Company had purchased the land. Salford agreed a 14-year lease on 5 acres (20,000 m^{2}) of land belonging to the Willows Estate Company, named after the abundance of willow trees in the area. Salford made their début at the Willows on 21 December 1901, beating Swinton 2–0, the official attendance reaching 16,981. James Lomas became rugby league's first £100 transfer, from Bramley to Salford in 1901.

The club continued making progress in the Rugby League Challenge Cup, reaching the semi-final stages in 1902, 1903, 1906, 1907 and 1910. On three occasions, they succeeded in reaching the final, but lost 0–25 to Broughton Rangers in 1902, 0–7 to Halifax in 1903 and 0–5 to Bradford in 1906. The Championship also proved elusive, the Reds finishing runners-up for three consecutive seasons from 1901 to 1904. In the last of those, Salford and Bradford finished level on points with Salford having the superior scoring record. Despite that, the Reds had to take part in a deciding match at Halifax, which they lost 5–0.

The Kiwis, then known as the All Golds, visited in 1907, and Salford played them on 28 December, losing 9–2 in front of a reported 9,000 spectators. Lance Todd, who was to have such an influence at the Willows 20 years later, was in the New Zealanders' side. A year later, the Australians stopped off at the Willows on 17 October. The result was a 9–9 draw. Salford won the Rugby Football League Championship in 1913–14. The club had financial problems and was in the hands of the official receiver but somehow in the Championship final, beat Huddersfield's "Team of All Talents" 5–3 on 25 April 1914, this was the club's first major honour. In August 1914, the Salford Football Club Company was finally wound up and a new company, Salford Football Club (1914) Limited was formed. During the First World War, Salford continued to function, but it was a struggle. Thirty-two Salford players volunteered for the war, of which seven were killed. The 1920s was an era of survival, on and off the field, the team opening the decade with their worst ever league placing, finishing last in 1920–21. There was a dramatic change of fortune during the summer of 1928 when Lance Todd became team manager. In his first season in charge (1928–29), "Toddy's Toddlers" went from 26th to fourth place in the table with virtually the same set of players.

Gus Risman was talent-spotted by Lance Todd, when he was 17 years old. He made his début for Salford on 31 August 1929. Other legendary names included Alan Edwards, Jack Feetham, Barney Hudson, Emlyn Jenkins, Billy Watkins and Billy Williams. Salford were considered the leading club in the game during the 1930s, winning three League Championships, five Lancashire League Championships, four Lancashire Cups and the Rugby League Challenge Cup. Salford won the Lancashire Cup for the first time in 1931 by beating Swinton 10–8 at the Cliff in front of a crowd of 26,471. Having been runners-up in the same competition in 1929 it was their first trophy for 17 years. Salford captured the Rugby League Championship in 1933 by beating Swinton 15–5 in the final at Central Park, Wigan. Salford were the first club to be invited to tour France who saw them as the premier side in the game. Their trip in October and November 1934 was to promote rugby league in the country. They won all six matches in spectacular fashion and were given their unofficial nickname; Les Diables Rouges (The Red Devils) by French journalists. The opening game was in Paris on Sunday 21 October, following an overnight ferry journey, having beaten Wigan 21–12 in the Lancashire Cup final the previous afternoon.

Salford turned its attention to baseball during the summer of 1935 as members of the National Baseball League. Matches were staged at the Willows. Several of Salford's players took part including Gus Risman. The team was called the Salford Reds. In 1936, for a third consecutive year, Salford won the Lancashire Cup, defeating Wigan 5–2 at Wilderspool, Warrington. Salford's highest attendance was set on 13 February 1937 when 26,470 turned up to watch Salford versus Warrington in the first round of the Rugby League Challenge Cup. The 1937 Australian touring team was beaten by Salford 11–8 at the Willows. Despite heavy rain that created muddy playing conditions, 12,000 attended. Salford beat Barrow 7–4 in the final of the 1938 Challenge Cup at Wembley, the club's first-ever win. A famous photograph was taken of Gus Risman and the cup being carried shoulder-high round the stadium by his teammates with him being the only one without a cigarette in his hand. In 1939, Salford became the first rugby league club to make successive visits to Wembley but were well beaten 20–3 by Halifax. On 3 September 1939, the Second World War began and the 1939–40 season was abandoned. A wartime Emergency League was organised but, at the beginning of January 1941, Salford decided to cease playing, due to poor gates. In November 1942, Lance Todd was killed in a car crash.

=== Post-war ===
On 25 August 1945, Salford played their first match after the war against Castleford, winning 10–0 at the Willows. Hundreds of supporters gave up their summer weekends to help put the derelict looking ground back into good order. In 1946, Salford appeared to be on their way to a third consecutive peacetime final, but Salford lost, unexpectedly, at home to Hunslet (15–8) at the quarter-final stage. In the second post-war season, 1946–47, Salford slid to twenty-second, a dramatic climb followed and the team finished seventh in 1948–49, and fifth in 1949–50. But it was a false dawn and the team fell into mid-table obscurity during the 1950s. In 1950, Salford finished fifth on scoring difference to miss out on a top-4 play-off spot but it was their highest post-war finish until 1973–74. Salford lost 4–8 to Warrington in a third-round Challenge Cup tie on 17 March 1951 at the Willows. The crowd was reported in the press as 28,000, the upper limit that had been set for the match. If correct it would be a ground record, but no official figure survives to confirm the exact attendance.

Salford won a four-team summer competition at Stanley Park in Blackpool 1952. Staged as part of Blackpool Corporation's Festival of Sport Fortnight, the Reds eliminated Barrow in the semi-final and then defeated Doncaster 26–7 in the final. When Gus Risman quit as a player in 1954, he coached Salford for four years, before moving temporarily to Phoenix, Arizona (USA) to care for his nephew who had recently been involved in a dog mauling incident. Saturday 26 November 1955 saw television cameras at the Willows for the first time when the second half of the match against New Zealand was broadcast live on BBC Grandstand. Salford hosted their first floodlit game, using Manchester United's ground on Wednesday 5 November 1958 against Leeds in a match postponed from October. Leeds won 22–17.

A proposal in 1960 to create a Manchester rugby league club at the former White City Stadium on Chester Road received strong opposition from Salford and Swinton. Their protests were renewed when a match was staged there between a Manchester XIII, drawn from both Salford and Swinton and the New Zealand tourists in September 1961 and the idea was subsequently dropped. Gus Risman returned to Salford as team manager in February 1962. Between March and September 1962, Salford hit an all-time low with 19 consecutive defeats. Covering two seasons, it is the worst run in the club's history. Salford also suffered what was then their largest margin of defeat, when they lost 59–0 at St. Helens.

=== Brian Snape era ===
Brian Snape succeeded Jim Hammond as chairman in September 1963. Snape appointed Griff Jenkins as secretary-coach in 1964, and the Reds immediately started to climb the league ladder. Salford built a variety club in 1966 in a bid to attract couples and parties to attend rugby matches. Between 1967 and 1972, Salford averaged over 7,000 spectators at a time when the league average was slipping below 2,000. In June 1967 the Willows switched on its floodlights for the first time in the match with Widnes on Friday 11 March 1966. From that evening, Friday night was rugby league night as the fans flocked to the Willows. In October 1967 David Watkins joined Salford for £15,000, a then club record. Watkins scored in 92 consecutive matches for Salford from 19 August 1972 to 25 April 1974. He totalled 929 points from 41 tries and 403 goals. In 1967, the Rugby Football League gave permission for games to be played on Sunday for the first time. The Willows staged its first Sunday fixture, a friendly with French club, Cavaillon, on 5 May 1968. It was not until the following season that the Reds were at home in their first competitive Sunday match, a second-round Challenge Cup-tie against Workington Town on 23 February 1969, Salford winning 12–5, destined for their third Wembley final which they lost 11–6 to Castleford, it was their first visit to Wembley after a gap of 30 years.

Salford's red devil nickname was immortalized when local football team Manchester United decided to replace their "Busby's Babes" nickname following the Munich crash. Matt Busby liked the sound of "Red Devils", thinking a devil was more intimidating to opponents than angelic babes and Manchester United adopted the "Red Devils" nickname. In 1969, the BBC documentary, the Game That Got Away, held up Salford's revenue model as a blueprint for other clubs to follow. In 1971, Salford beat the New Zealand tourists for the first time after five previous defeats. In October 1972, Salford reached the final of the Lancashire Cup for the first time since 1938, beating Swinton 25–11 at Wilderspool, Warrington to win their first trophy in thirty-three years. Salford reached the next three Lancashire Cup finals but failed to recapture the cup in any of them. They were also runners-up to Leeds in the 1972–73 Players No.6 Trophy. In 1973–74 and 1975–76 the club claimed two Championships and won the 1974–75 BBC2 Floodlit Trophy. The 1974 Championship was their first since 1938–39.

Salford's last major final of the Brian Snape era was the 1976 Premiership Trophy decider played at Station Road, Swinton. Salford conceded three tries in the last 12 minutes to lose 15–2. As the 1970s drew to a close, many star players had retired or were approaching the veteran stage, with no funds available to replace them. In the 1976–77 season, the Salford versus Leeds match was abandoned just after half-time, after Chris Sanderson of Leeds suffered a fatal injury, after 38 minutes. Leeds were ahead 5–2, but the game was declared null and void and not replayed. Stan McCormick was coach between February 1978 and March 1978. At the end of the 1977–78 season, Brian Snape left Salford, handing over the reins to his brother Keith.

=== Post-Snape era ===
In May 1978, Alex Murphy was a surprise appointment as Salford coach. Years earlier he had famously referred to Salford's expensively built team as the 'Quality Street Gang'. Salford's home league fixture with Widnes was designated as the club's 'Centenary Match' in October 1979. Watched by 11,982, the result was 16–16, Salford playing in their original jersey colours of red, amber and black hoops. In fact Salford was founded in 1873 as Cavendish, changing their name to Salford in 1879. Alex Murphy left in November 1980, he was replaced by Kevin Ashcroft. By the end of the 1970s, the variety centre was losing money and in 1980, it was sold to the brewery Greenall Whitley. In 1981, Salford reverted to playing on Sunday afternoons. On 3 January 1982, John Wilkinson took over as chairman. Wilkinson inherited a club living above its income, forcing him to make cost-saving measures. Mike Coulman coached Salford for the 1983–84 season. Between July–August 1986, Salford participated in an 8-a-side touch rugby competition that included most of the senior clubs. The Reds won after beating Featherstone Rovers in the final at Elland Road, Leeds.

While the books were being balanced, steady progress was made on it, the Reds pulling off a major coup with the signing of Australian full-back Garry Jack in 1988. The Lancashire Cup final was reached in 1988, the Reds losing narrowly to favourites Wigan. Kevin Tamati became coach in 1989. 1990 turned out to be a golden year. Salford won the Second Division Championship, losing just one game all season. In the Premiership final in front of 50,000 at Old Trafford, the Red Devils beat Halifax 27–20. They also made the final of the Lancashire Cup, losing narrowly to favourites Widnes. In 1993 Garry Jack became head coach and manager as Tamati left. Jack was relieved from the coaching duties before being sacked as club manager in early 1995.

=== Summer era ===
In 1996, the first tier of British rugby league clubs played the inaugural Super League season and changed from a winter to a summer season. Andy Gregory had finished his playing days as player-coach at Salford in 1995. Salford finished with 21 points; six-points clear of Hull F.C. and seemingly safe from a drop into the lower leagues. However, the Rupert Murdoch-funded Super League competition proposed, as part of the deal, that some traditional clubs would merge. Salford were to merge with Oldham to form a Manchester club that would compete in Super League. When Salford visited Oldham for a match on Good Friday, 14 April, supporters of both clubs demonstrated against the idea by invading the pitch during the interval. This merger was resisted but Salford were not included in the new competition.

Salford added Reds to their name for the 1995–96 season. In 1996 Salford beat Wigan 26–16 at the Willows to produce one of the Challenge Cup's biggest shocks. It brought to an end a record run of eight successive Wembley victories by Wigan. Salford went on to reclaim their place in Super League by edging out Keighley to win the First Division. Gregory left Salford by mutual consent in May 1999 to concentrate on his pub business in Wigan. John Harvey replaced him as head coach. Salford Reds became Salford City Reds in 1999 reportedly because Salford Council wanted their financial support for the club to be recognised, so their name was changed to emphasise the city status of Salford. The club's first match as Salford City Reds took place against Gateshead at the Willows on 18 July 1999. After the club avoided relegation at the end of the 1999 season, Harvey was given a contract for a further season. He resigned in July 2001 following a 70–4 defeat at Wigan.

Steve McCormack became the youngest Super League coach at the age of just 28 in 2001 but was sacked just 10 months later, after winning only three of 20 games. He was replaced by Karl Harrison, who had been Assistant Coach to Brian Noble at Bradford Bulls. Salford City Reds struggled in the 2002 season and Harrison was unable to keep the club in the Super League, despite a good end to the season. Indeed, they went into the final match of the season second from bottom (only the bottom club were relegated that season). However, a home defeat by Castleford, coupled with a home win for Wakefield Trinity over Warrington, resulted in relegation for the Reds. The 2003 season was spent in the National League 1, where the Reds – remaining as a full-time club (most other National League One teams were part-time or amateur clubs) – performed very well, losing only 2 games all season. Salford won 90–8 at Gateshead, their highest score since 1907 and then four days later Salford beat Gateshead again 100–12 in the National Cup at the Willows, a club record score. On their way to finishing top of the National League 1 table, Salford also won the Arriva Trains Cup beating Leigh in the final. Having finished on top of the National League One table, Salford entered the National League One play-offs, needing to win their match to qualify for the final. They beat Leigh in a bad-tempered match, to qualify for the National League One Grand Final. Leigh were forced into a knock-out semi-final to try to get through to the Grand Final – a play-off match they ultimately won.

Salford City Reds then comfortably beat Leigh in the Grand Final, to gain promotion to Super League after one season out. It was the sixth time out of seven meetings between the two that Salford had beaten Leigh that season (the first match ended in a draw). Leigh would follow Salford into Super League the following season. 2004 was a consolidatory season for the Reds, notably mostly for an impressive home win over St. Helens and coming from 12 points behind Castleford in a game three times in the season to win all three games, the third of which – at Castleford's "The Jungle" ground confirmed Salford's survival in the Super League and practically relegated 'Cas' in the process. In the end the Reds finished 9th. The 2005 season saw Salford Reds sign Luke Robinson and David Hodgson from Wigan, both of whom performed excellently well for the Reds all season. Although Salford were unable to improve on the 9th-place finish of the previous season, they were regarded as one of the most improved teams in Super League and finished 6-points higher than they had the season before. However, relegation was again a real threat, as – to accommodate Catalans Dragons from France into Super League in 2006 – two clubs were relegated in 2005 instead of just one. Leigh comfortably finished bottom of the table, losing 14 games in a row. Widnes were also relegated, 6-points behind the Reds.

The 2006 Season started with wins at Warrington, and against Catalans Dragons at the Willows. Further wins over Wigan and Wakefield Trinity meant that Salford had won 4 of their opening 5 games (losing to Bradford in round 3). Salford in SLXI lost eight games by fewer than 6 points, including 1 point defeats to Leeds, Hull F.C. and Harlequins RL and 2 point defeats to Leeds and St. Helens. However, Salford's victory over Castleford on 10 September 2006, ensured that they would play in the Super League play-offs for the first time in their history in a season they had started as favourites for relegation according to most pundits. It is the club's highest position in a top division since coming fourth in 1979–80 in the old First Division. In their first-ever Super League play-off match, Salford City Reds were routed 52–6 at Odsal Stadium against Bradford on Saturday 23 September 2006.

Karl Harrison was sacked as first-team coach on 22 May 2007 following a disastrous run of form that saw the Reds win just three games and draw another in the opening 16 rounds of the 2007 Season, and left them languishing at the bottom of the League Table with a meagre 7 points. Team Director of Football, Steve Simms took over in a caretaker role for two games, winning the first against an in-form Huddersfield and only losing by a single point against then World Champions, St. Helens.

On 11 June 2007 long-term favourite to take the role, Shaun McRae was announced as the new head coach. On 15 June 2007, Salford beat Harlequins 5–2 in the first and until 13 February 2025, the only Super League game not to contain a try. On 2 September 2007, Salford were relegated from Super League when Hull Kingston Rovers beat Hull F.C. 42–6.

=== Super League licence era and move to Barton ===
McRae led the Salford side to triple success in the National League, winning the Northern Rail Cup, the League Leaders' Trophy and the Grand Final. Salford City Reds were awarded a three-year Super League licence in July 2008 as the game moved away from automatic promotion and relegation. The Reds beat Leeds at Headingley 30–20 in 2009 to produce one of the biggest surprises of the season. Salford had only defeated Leeds away twice since 1946, the last occasion being 1977. Shaun McRae was off ill with an undisclosed illness for most of the 2011 season, assistant coach Phil Veivers was caretaker manager and was promoted to head coach in November 2011.

The Reds were awarded a three-year licence to compete in the Super League from 2012 to 2014. They finished the 2011 Super League XVI season in 11th place. In 2012, the club left the Willows to move into the new Salford City Stadium at Barton, Eccles. Their first league match at the new stadium was on 4 February 2012 against Castleford, who beat Reds 10–24. They finished the 2012 Super League XVII season in 11th place again.

In January 2013, the hearing of a winding-up petition over money Salford owed to HM Revenue and Customs and to players in unpaid wages was adjourned for four weeks so that new investors in the club could be sought. It was indicated that the club could be taken over by Marwan Koukash. On 31 January 2013 it was confirmed that Koukash would take over the club. Phil Veivers was sacked as coach in March 2013 after Salford lost four of their first five games, with Alan Hunte taking temporary charge until former Bradford, Great Britain and Crusaders coach Brian Noble was revealed as the new coach.

=== 2013–2024: Salford Red Devils ===
Salford signed eight more players and relaunched as Red Devils on 5 September 2013, including former Castleford star halfback and international Rangi Chase, and fellow England player Gareth Hock. The former Warrington captain Adrian Morley, ex-Wakefield Trinity's Tim Smith, and Samoa internationals Francis Meli and Tony Puletua, both formerly of St. Helens, complete the signings from Super League teams. Signings from the Australian NRL were the former Parramatta Eels fullback Jake Mullaney, ex-Melbourne Storm centre Junior Sa'u and Steve Rapira, previously of New Zealand Warriors. Also signed were former Salford Academy product, Jason Walton and Greg Johnson, both from Championship side Batley.

It was confirmed in early April 2014 that Iestyn Harris, a former assistant coach at rival Super League club Wigan, would become the new head coach of Salford. Owner Marwan Koukash had been in talks with Wigan to negotiate bringing Harris to the AJ Bell Stadium but did not state his prospective role to the public. Former Salford Head Coach Brian Noble has been offered the job of Director of Football after being dismissed from his position as head coach after a mediocre start to his first full season in charge.

In 2014, it was revealed that Salford mayor Ian Stewart lent almost £200,000 to the club to keep them afloat, without consulting others at the council. Salford City Council also part-own the stadium where the club play. In September 2015, four players, Rangi Chase, captain Harrison Hansen, Cory Paterson and Théo Fages, were released by the club by new Director of Rugby and Australian national team coach Tim Sheens.

In 2015, Salford failed to finish in the top 8 of Super League and ended up in The Qualifiers. In 2015, they finished 3rd in the table and secured Super League status for the 2016 season.

In 2016, Salford managed enough wins to finish in the top 8 of Super League, but breaches of the Salary Cap in 2014 and 2015 saw them deducted 6 points and the finished the season 10th and they were placed in The Qualifiers again. Here, they suffered numerous losses, including to the London Broncos and Leigh Centurions, who had both been in the Championship that season and could only finish 5th in the Qualifiers table. This meant they ended up in the 2016 Million Pound Game away to Hull Kingston Rovers. Despite not being in front in the entire 80 minutes, Salford scored two unconverted tries in the last 90 seconds of normal time to take the game to Golden Point extra time. Less than a minute into the extra time, Salford scored a Drop Goal to win the match and secure Super League status for 2017.

In 2018, Salford finished second last in the table and were condemned to play in the 2018 Rugby League Qualifiers. Salford managed to avoid relegation to the RFL Championship after finishing top of the qualifiers table and secured their place for the 2019 Super League season.

In 2019, Salford reached the 2019 Super League Grand Final after defeating Castleford and Wigan to reach the decider. Salford were looking to win their first championship since 1976 but faced a St Helens side who had only lost 3 games all season. Salford would go on to lose the final 23–6 at Old Trafford.

The 2020 season was heavily affected by the ongoing COVID-19 pandemic and, following the departure of the Toronto Wolfpack from Super League, several teams – including Salford – had results annulled. The league campaign was disappointing, but Salford did manage to reach the 2020 Challenge Cup Final, the first time they had reached the Wembley showpiece since the 1968–69 Challenge Cup. Unfortunately for Salford, a late drop goal from Luke Gale won the Challenge Cup for the Leeds Rhinos by 17–16. At the end of the 2020 season, Head Coach, Ian Watson, left the club leaving the Red Devils "surprised and disappointed by [the] decision" in order to take up the role of Head Coach at the Huddersfield Giants.

On 18 December 2020 it was announced that Salford had been fined £15,000 (half of it suspended) for failing to fulfil a fixture v Warrington Wolves in the height of the COVID-19 pandemic; Salford had informed the RFL that they had only 13 players available for selection.

Salford finished the 2021 Super League season in 11th place on the table after a disastrous campaign which included an embarrassing loss against Leigh who had lost their previous 16 matches in a row. On 22 September 2021, Richard Marshall who had only been appointed head coach at the start of the year, left the club by mutual consent.

Salford started the 2022 Super League season poorly winning only three of their first ten matches. After their round 15 loss to Wigan, Salford were sitting 10th place on the table. In round 16, Salford recorded one of the biggest wins in their history defeating Wakefield Trinity 74–10. The victory started Salford on a winning run as they recorded eight wins in the next eleven games including a 44–12 win over St Helens RFC. Salford would finish the regular season in 6th place and qualify for the playoffs. In the elimination playoff, Salford would upset Huddersfield 28–0. In the semi-final, Salford would lose controversially to St Helens 19–12. With less than ten minutes remaining, Salford were not awarded a penalty try after it appeared Tommy Makinson took out Salford's Tim Lafai in the act of scoring a try. Makinson was sin binned for a professional foul and the referee stated he was not convinced Lafai would have grounded the ball.

Salford finished the 2023 Super League season in 7th place, missing the playoffs by two competition points.

=== 2024–2025: Financial difficulties and winding-up ===
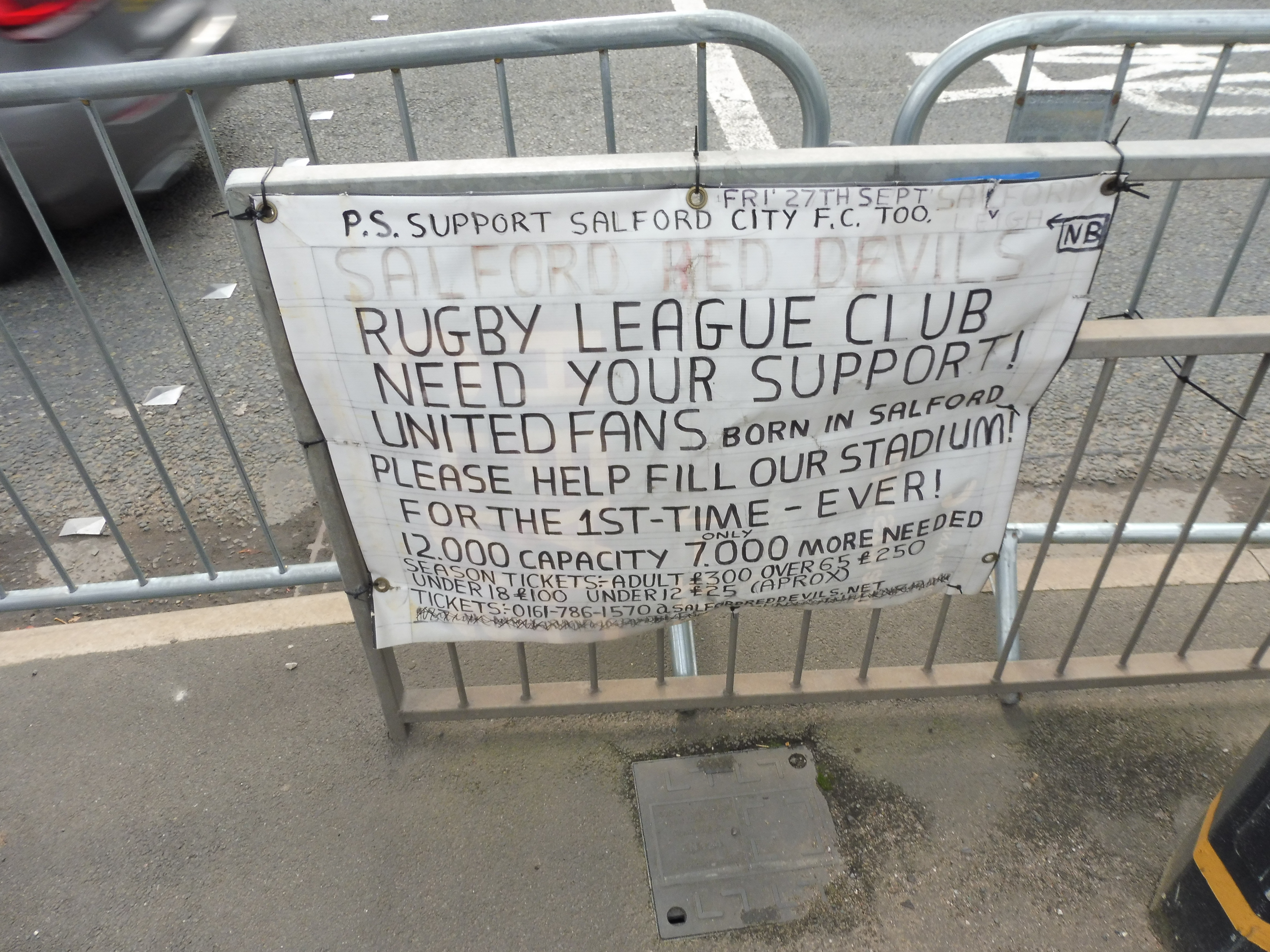
Banner hung outside of Old Trafford advertising for Manchester United football fans to attend Salford's 2024 Eliminators fixture against the Leigh Leopards

In the 2024 Super League season, Salford finished 4th on the table and qualified for the playoffs. They were eliminated in the first week of the playoffs by Leigh. Following the conclusion of the season, it was revealed that Salford had finished in the lowest place for Super League teams in the IMG gradings.

In November, financial issues caused Salford to request an advancement on their central funding for the 2025 Super League season, which was granted by a ballot of the other Super League clubs. Salford's financial issues continued through the off season. In January, three weeks before the start of the season, the RFL ordered a player sale at the club, reducing their sustainability cap to £1.2 million.

On 7 February 2025, Salford were bought out by a consortium led by businessman Dario Berta. In their first Super League fixture of the year against St Helens at the Totally Wicked Stadium, as a result of salary cap restrictions, Salford controversially fielded a squad of only 16 players, with only three senior squad members - Joe Bullock, Tiaki Chan and Ben Hellewell - present as substitutes, the remainder filled with Salford's reserves. The match, which aired on BBC Two, ended 0-82, the highest Super League winning margin since Salford were beaten 12-92 by the Bradford Bulls in June 2000. A compliance investigation was launched by the RFL on the Monday following the game.

Salford's salary cap was initially lifted after the consortium provided adequate evidence for the club's future finances being sustainable, however failure to pay staff in February lead to the 1.2 million salary cap being reimposed on 5 March. Salford again failed to pay staff in March.

By the end of April 2025 six established first-team players had left the club as a direct consequence, namely, club-captain Kallum Watkins, Brad Singleton, Marc Sneyd, Chris Atkin, Deon Cross and Tim Lafai, with other first-team players Sam Davis, Nene Macdonald and Joe Bullock going out on loan. Come May, their Chief Executive, Chris Irwin, had resigned.

Following the player exodus, result continued to worsen including an 6-80 defeat to Hull FC in August, their second worse losing margin of 2025 after their opening game. Their next match against Wakefield was cancelled over player welfare concerns with only 17 player available (one short of a matchday squad) and only two of the 17 having played in Super League previously. On the day the match was due to be held, a fan protest against the club's ownership occurred.

The club failed to register an application to retain their Super League place, and were effectively relegated in September 2025.

Follow the conclusion of the season, Salford were found guilty of an operational rule breach regarding their involvement in Super League's record score margin game during the first matchweek of the season. The club were deemed to have fielded a significantly weaker team than their salary cap restrictions had limited them to thus affecting the integrity of the competition. They were docked two points and fined £5000, half suspended for four years. The RFL had postponed the hearing twice due to Salford being unable to provide legal representation.

Their final game also saw a fan protest towards the ownership of the club. A section of this protest turned violent with the club experiencing "multiple acts of criminality" against them. Multiple pieces of equipment were stolen.

In May 2025 a winding up petition began against the club amid unpaid debt to HMRC. The petition, adjourned four consecutive times, was eventually finalised on 3 December 2025. The high court made the club's parent company, Salford City Reds (2013) Limited, the subject of a liquidation order. At this point, the company's debts were estimated at £4 million.

The same day the winding-up order was made, the Rugby Football League (RFL) terminated the club's membership of the RFL. However the RFL announced that if a new company was formed with plans acceptable to the RFL, the new company will be granted membership of the RFL in time for the start of the new season. Three submissions to form a new club were submitted to the RFL by the 11 December 2025 deadline with a final decision to be made on 17 December. The three bids were submitted by consortia headed by former Salford player, Mason Caton-Brown; former club CEO, Chris Irwin; and former Samoan rugby union player, Tracy Atiga.

=== 2025: Resurrection ===
On 22 December 2025 it was announced that the successful bid was that made by Salford RLFC Ltd, headed up by former Salford player, Mason Caton-Brown, and local businessmen Malcolm Crompton and Paul Hancock, who are the directors of the company. Membership of the RFL was reinstated allowing the club to participate in the 2026 season. Mike Grady was appointed coach but left the club on 24 March 2026 after only three months in charge.

== Colours and badge ==
=== Colours ===
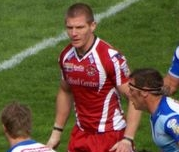
Quins v Salford in 2009

Salford have traditionally played in predominantly red with bits of white. When the club was rebranded as the Red Devils the club colours were changed slightly with black replacing the small amount of white that appears on the home kit.

=== Badge ===
Traditionally Salford used the city's coat of arms as many other clubs did until the Super League era started in 1996 and many clubs rebranded. Salford City as they were then known added Reds to their name and a new logo. In 2013 the club rebranded again becoming the Salford Red Devils. In 2017 a new club crest was introduced, the centrepiece of the new design is the willow tree, symbolising the club's spiritual home and indeed the city – the name Salford was initially derived from Sealhford, meaning a ford by the willow trees. The devil's trident adorns the top of the crest, while there are also five workers bees, included to represent the five industrial communities that grew around the centre of the textile industry in the area. There is a nod to the rivers and canals which were the lifeblood of the region during the industrial revolution and the Lowry Millennium footbridge in Salford Quays. In November 2020, the club reverted to a logo featuring the Devil.

== Stadiums ==
=== 1879–1901: New Barnes ===
Salford's original ground was at New Barnes (sometimes spelt New Barns) on ground on the north side of Manchester Racecourse (53°28′32″N 2°17′27″W). The club's first game in the Northern Union was played at this ground on 5 September 1896. In 1901 the club was forced to leave as the ground and racecourse had been purchased by the Manchester Ship Canal company for expansion of the dock area. The last game at New Barnes was on 30 November 1901.

=== 1901–2011: The Willows ===
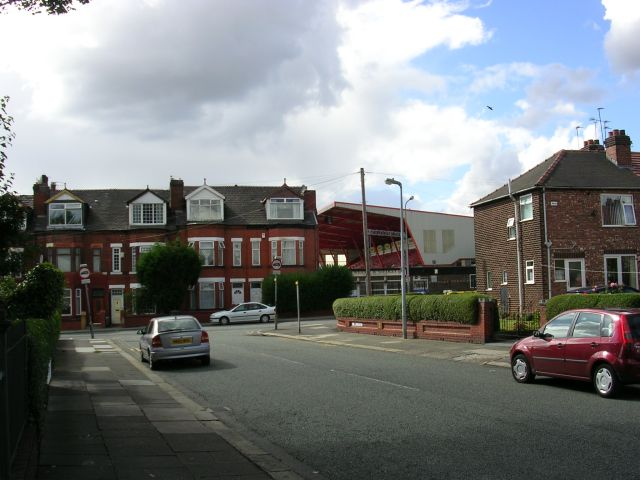
The Willows

In 1900, Salford agreed a 14-year lease on 5 acres (20,000 m^{2}) of land belonging to the Willows Estate Company, named after the abundance of willow trees in the area. They made their debut at the Willows on 21 December 1901, beating Swinton 2–0 in front of 16,981 fans. In the 1960s, the terrace was flattened at the Willows Road end to make way for the Salford Football and Social Club which was officially opened on 16 June 1966. The Willows switched on its floodlights for the first time in the match with Widnes on Friday 11 March 1966. On 26 November 1989, Salford unveiled a new £50,000 electronic scoreboard above the Willows Variety Centre.

=== 2012–present: CorpAcq Stadium ===
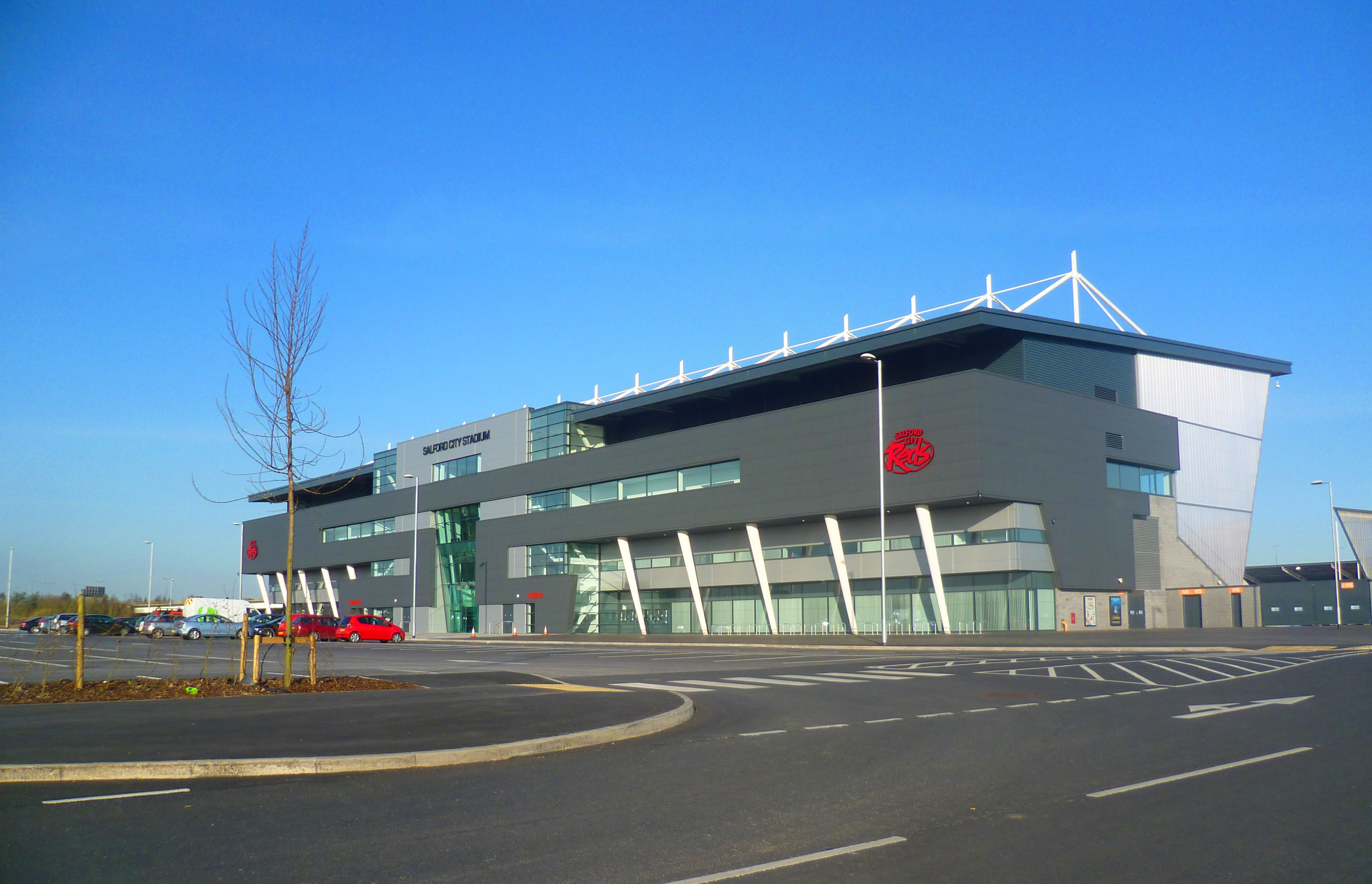
AJ Bell Stadium

From the start of the 2012 season, Salford have played at the purpose-built Salford Community Stadium in Barton-upon-Irwell, co-owned by Peel Holdings and Salford City Council and shared with rugby union side Sale Sharks. From 2013 to 2023 the stadium was named the AJ Bell Stadium due to a naming rights deal with financial services company AJ Bell. In 2015 Salford were in talks with a landowner in Salford about building a new stadium in Salford because of rent low attendances since the current stadium is in Salford, although nothing came from these talks. The stadium has now been renamed to CorpAcq Stadium where the new Salford RLFC will play its games.

== Jersey sponsors and manufacturers ==
Year	Kit Manufacturer	Main Shirt Sponsor
1985–1990	Halbro	Wilcox/Trenchman/Cambrian Soft Drinks
1990–1992	Ellgren	ESAB
1992–1995	Ellgren	Cebora
1995–1997	Arrow	Cebora
1998–1999	Joe Bloggs	Cebora
2000–2004	Joe Bloggs	Trafford Centre
2005–2008	ISC	Trafford Centre
2009–2011	Kooga	Trafford Centre
2012–2013	Kooga	Media City UK
2014–2015	Under Armour	Media City UK
2016–2017	Raging Bull	Mitsubishi
2017–2018	Steeden	Mitsubishi
2019	Kappa	Mitsubishi
2020–2021	Kappa	Morson
2021-2024	VX3	Selco Builders Warehouse
2025	VX3	University of Salford
2026	Debeau Performance	OnBuy.com

== 2027 squad ==
2027 Salford RLFC Squad
First team squad			Coaching staff
2 (Wales) Mike Butt – WG; 4 (England) Joe Hartley – CE; 5 (England) Jake Bibby – CE, WG; 6 (England) Toby Hughes – SH, SO; 7 (England) Marc Sneyd (gk) – SH; 8 (England) Jack Bibby – PR; 9 (England) Brad Dwyer (c) – HK; 10 (Wales) Sam Bowring – PR, SR; 11 (England) Matty Ashurst – SR; 12 (England) Ollie Garmston – SR, CE	13 (England) Cole Oakley – SR, CE; 14 (England) Joe Baldwin – HK; 15 (England) Reece Stanton – PR; 16 (England) Shaun Costello – LF, PR; 17 (Wales) Owain Abel – FB, SO; 19 (England) Jake Spedding – CE, WG; 20 (England) Lewis Pilling – SO, SH; 21 (Wales) Charlie Glover – LF, PR; 22 (England) Callum Green – FB, WG; 23 (England) Jack Holmes – CE, WG, FB	24 (England) Keane Gilford – WG, CE; 25 (England) Matty Ross – SO, SH; 26 (England) Cole Appleby – PR; 27 (Spain) Damola Lola – PR; 29 (England) Riley Johnson – WG; 30 (England) Noah Appleby – SR, CE; 31 (England) Oli Jolliffe – PR; (England) Joe McGann – HK	Head coach: Dave Hewitt; Assistant coach: Brad Dwyer (player-coach); Legend: (c) Captain(s); (vc) Vice-captain(s); Updated: Source(s): https://www.salfordrlfc.co.uk/teams/

== 2027 transfers ==
=== Gains ===
Player	From	Contract	Date
(England) Marc Sneyd	Warrington Wolves	3 years	19 July 2026
(Wales) Mike Butt	Widnes Vikings		9 September 2026
(England) Jake Bibby	Oldham RLFC	1 year	14 October 2026
(England) Matty Ashurst	Oldham RLFC	2 years	21 October 2026
(England) Oli Jolliffe	Latchford Giants ARLFC	1 year	18 November 2026
(England) Joe McGann	Wigan Warriors	1 year	19 November 2026

=== Losses ===
Player	To	Contract	Date
(England) Owen Haldenby	Goole Vikings	1 year	12 October 2026
(Wales) Fin Yates			19 October 2026
(Ireland) Danny Lynch	Swinton Lions	1 year	20 October 2026
(England) Sam Hill			20 November 2026

=== Retired ===
Player	Date
(England) Kieran Dixon	2 November 2026

== Players ==
=== Notable former players ===
==== Team of the Century ====
In 2001, Salford selected a team consisting of the greatest players to appear for the club since the first game at the Willows in 1901. The team was selected by supporters, board members, sports writers and club historians.

No.	Player name
1	Paul Charlton
2	Barney Hudson
3	Jimmy Lomas
4	Gus Risman (c)
5	Maurice Richards
6	Emlyn Jenkins
7	Jackie Brennan
8	Billy Williams
9	Malcolm Alker
10	Dai Moses
11	Colin Dixon
12	Mike Coulman
13	Jack Feetham
14	David Watkins (MBE)
15	Chris Hesketh (MBE)
16	Dai Davies
17	Eric Prescott
Coach	Lance Todd

==== Other notable players ====
These players have either; played in a Championship, Challenge Cup, or Lancashire Cup final, or played in Lancashire League winning teams, received a Testimonial match, are Hall Of Fame Inductees, were international representatives before, or after, their time at Salford, or are notable outside of rugby league.

- Jack Anderton 1888 British Isles tourist (RU)
- (Wales) William "Billy" Banks
- Les Bettinson (#4) circa-1965
- (Wales) David Bishop
- Ian Blease (Testimonial match 1996)
- Charlie Bott
- Andrew "Andy" Burgess (Testimonial match 1998)
- (England) David Cairns (No. 7)
- Colin Dixon (Testimonial match 1979)
- Hugh Duffy (No. F), for Scotland (RU) while at Jed-Forest RFC (RU) 1955 1-cap (signed for Salford 1954–55)
- Harry Eagles 1888 British Isles tourist (RU)
- (England) Tex Evans
- Albert Gear 1937–38 Challenge Cup Final winner, and try scorer
- (New Zealand) Harry Goldsmith 1914 final
- (Wales) Clive Griffiths
- (Wales) Adrian Hadley
- John Hancock (England (RU), Newport RFC)
- Warren Jowitt
- Mark Lee (Testimonial match 2000)
- David Major (Testimonial match 1989)
- Stodger Meek (from Bream RUFC)
- Frank Miles
- (Wales) David "Dai" Moses
- (Wales) Malcolm Price
- Craig Randall 1991–98
- (Wales) Maurice Richards (Testimonial match 1980)
- Vincent Slater scored the winning try for Lancashire against Middlesex at The Oval on 12 March 1887
- (England) Ferguson Southward circa-1925
- (Wales) Harold Thomas
- J. Williams circa-1920
- Sam Williams 1888 British Isles tourist (RU)

== Past coaches ==
- James Lomas 1922–26
- Lance Todd 1928–40
- Gus Risman 1954–58
- George Parsons 1960–63
- Ted Cahill 1963–64
- Griff Jenkins 1964–70
- Cliff Evans 1970–73
- Les Bettinson 1973–78
- Colin Dixon 1978
- Stan McCormick 1978
- Alex Murphy 1978–80
- Kevin Ashcroft 1980–82
- Alan McInnes 1982
- Malcolm Aspey 1982–83
- Mike Coulman 1983–84
- Kevin Ashcroft 1984–90
- Kevin Tamati 1990–93
- Garry Jack 1994–95
- Andy Gregory 1995–99
- John Harvey 1999–2000
- Steve McCormack 2001–02
- Karl Harrison 2002–07
- Steve Simms 2007
- Shaun McRae 2007–11
- Matt Parish 2011
- Phil Veivers 2011–13
- Alan Hunte 2013
- Brian Noble 2013–14
- Iestyn Harris 2014–15
- Ian Watson 2016–20
- Richard Marshall 2020–21
- Paul Rowley 2021–25
- Mike Grady 2026
- Dave Hewitt (interim) 2026

== Staff ==
=== First Team coaching staff ===
Position	Staff
Head Coach	(England) Dave Hewitt
Assistant Coach	(England) Brad Dwyer (player-coach)

=== Club officials ===
President	(England) John Wilkinson
Chairman	(England) Malcolm Crompton
Chief Executive	(Scotland) Ryan Brierley
General Manager	(England) Marcelle Lock

== Seasons ==
Time spent in each division of the British rugby league system:

- 1975–81: First Division
- 1981–83: Second Division
- 1983–84: First Division
- 1984–85: Second Division
- 1985–90: First Division
- 1990–91: Second Division
- 1991–95: First Division
- 1995–96: Second Division
- 1997–02: Super League
- 2003: Championship
- 2004–07: Super League
- 2008: Championship
- 2009–25: Super League
- 2026: Championship

=== Summer era seasons ===
Season	League									Play-offs	Challenge Cup	Other competitions		Name	Tries	Name	Points
Season	Division	P	W	D	L	F	A	Pts (Note: Win percentage for 2020 and 2021)	Pos	Play-offs	Challenge Cup	Other competitions		Top try scorer		Top point scorer	
1996	Division One	20	18	0	2	733	298	36	1st		QF						
1997	Super League	22	11	0	11	428	495	22	6th		SF						
1998	Super League	23	6	1	16	319	575	13	11th		SF						
1999	Super League	30	6	1	23	526	916	13	11th		QF						
2000	Super League	28	10	0	18	542	910	20	11th		QF						
2001	Super League	28	8	0	20	587	596	16	10th		R4						
2002	Super League	28	5	1	22	490	856	11	12th		R4						
2003	National League One	18	14	2	2	732	294	30	1st		R4	Championship Cup	W				
2004	Super League	28	8	0	20	507	828	16	9th		R4						
2005	Super League	28	11	0	17	549	732	22	9th		R5						
2006	Super League	28	13	0	15	600	539	26	5th	Lost in Elimination Playoffs	QF						
2007	Super League	27	6	1	20	475	874	13	12th		R5						
2008	National League One	18	12	3	3	614	302	45	1st	Won in Play-off Final	R4	Championship Cup	W				
2009	Super League	27	7	0	20	456	754	14	13th		R4						
2010	Super League	27	8	0	19	448	857	16	12th		R4						
2011	Super League	27	10	0	17	542	809	20	11th		R5						
2012	Super League	27	8	1	18	618	844	17	11th		R5						
2013	Super League	27	6	1	20	436	953	11	14th		R5						
2014	Super League	27	11	1	15	608	695	23	10th		R5						
2015	Super League	23	8	1	14	447	617	17	11th		R5						
2015	The Qualifiers	7	5	0	2	239	203	10	3rd		R5						
2016	Super League	23	10	0	13	560	569	14	10th	Won in the Million Pound Game	R6						
2016	The Qualifiers	7	3	0	4	208	152	6	5th	Won in the Million Pound Game	R6						
2017	Super League	30	14	0	16	680	728	28	7th		SF						
2018	Super League	23	7	0	16	384	597	14	11th		R6						
2018	The Qualifiers	7	5	0	2	218	75	10	1st		R6						
2019	Super League	29	17	0	12	783	597	34	3rd	Lost in Grand Final	R6						
2020	Super League	18	8	0	10	354	469	27.78	9th		RU						
2021	Super League	22	7	0	15	402	584	31.82	11th		QF						
2022	Super League	27	14	0	13	700	602	28	6th	Lost in Semi Final	R6						
2023	Super League	27	13	0	14	494	512	26	7th		QF						
2024	Super League	27	16	0	11	550	547	32	4th	Lost in Elimination Playoffs	R6						
2025	Super League	27	3	0	24	234	1129	4	12th		QF						
2026	Championship	24	8	0	16	544	796	16	12th		R3	1895 Cup	R1				

== Honours ==
=== League ===
- First Division / Super League:

Winners (6): 1913–14, 1932–33, 1936–37, 1938–39, 1973–74, 1975–76
Runners up (5): 1901–02, 1902–03, 1903–04, 1933–34, 2019

- Second Division / Championship:

Winners (5): 1990–91, 1995–96, 1996, 2003, 2008
Runners up (1): 1984–85

RFL Championship Leaders' Shield

Winners (2): 2004, 2008

- Lancashire League:

Winners (5): 1932–33, 1933–34, 1934–35, 1936–37, 1938–39

=== Cups ===
- Challenge Cup:

Winners (1): 1937–38
Runners up (7): 1899–1900, 1901–02, 1902–03, 1905–06, 1938–39, 1968–69, 2020

- Lancashire Cup:

Winners (5): 1931–32, 1934–35, 1935–36, 1936–37, 1972–73
Runners up (7): 1929–30, 1938–39, 1973–74, 1974–75, 1975–76, 1988–89, 1990–91

- BBC2 Floodlit Trophy:

Winners (1): 1974–75

- Championship Cup:

Winners (2): 2003, 2008

== Records ==
=== Player records ===
- Most tries in a game: 6 by Frank Miles vs Lees, 5 March 1898
- Most goals in a game 14 by Steve Blakeley vs Gateshead Thunder, 23 March 2003
- Most points in a game 39 by James "Jim" Lomas vs Liverpool City, 2 February 1907
- Most tries in a season: 46 by Keith Fielding, 1973–74
- Most goals in a season: 221 by David Watkins, 1972–73
- Most points in a season: 493 by David Watkins, 1972–73
- Most career goals: 1,241 by David Watkins, 1967–79
- Most career tries: 297 by Maurice Richards, 1969–83
- Most career points: 2,907 by David Watkins, 1967–79
- Most career appearances: 496 (+2 as substitute) by Maurice Richards, 1969–83

=== Team records ===
- Highest attendance (The Willows): 26,470 vs Warrington, 13 February 1937 (Rugby League Challenge Cup)
- Highest attendance (AJ Bell Stadium): 10,867 vs Leigh Leopards, 27 September 2024 (Rugby League Eliminator, Super League Playoffs)
- Highest attendance (all time): 97,939 vs Castleford, 17 May 1969 (Challenge Cup Final) at Wembley Stadium
- Highest attendance vs an international touring team: 15,761 vs Australia, 21 October 1933 (1933–34 Kangaroo Tour) at The Willows
- Biggest victory: 100–12 vs Gateshead Thunder, 23 March 2003
- Heaviest defeat: 96–16 vs Bradford Bulls, 25 June 2000

== Cultural references ==
A 1928 oil painting by the Salford-born artist L. S. Lowry, entitled Going to the Match, is a depiction of rugby league fans walking to a match. It is thought that the blue and red scarves worn by fans in the crowd and the red flag flying by the rugby ground indicate that this was a match played by Salford against Swinton. The painting was displayed at a 2012 exhibition in The Lowry, before being auctioned at Sotheby's, and it is now in a private collection.

== See also ==
- Salford RLFC Women
