= Halifax Panthers =

English professional rugby league club based in Halifax, West Yorkshire, England

Club information
- Full name: Halifax Panthers Rugby League Football Club
- Nickname(s): Fax; Panthers
- Colours: Blue and White
- Founded: 1873; 153 years ago
- Website: halifaxpanthers.co.uk

Current details
- Ground: The Shay
- Chairman: Martyn Buchan
- Coach: Kyle Eastmond
- Competition: Championship
- 2026 season: 19th
- Current season

Uniforms
Home colours	Away colours

Records
- Championships: 4 (1903, 1907, 1965, 1986)
- Challenge Cups: 5 (1903, 1904, 1931, 1939, 1987)
- Other top-tier honours: 14

The Halifax Panthers is a professional rugby league club in Halifax, West Yorkshire, England. They play home games at The Shay and compete in the Championship, the second tier of British rugby league.

Halifax Panthers won the League Championship four times and the Challenge Cup five times.

They have rivalries with neighbours Bradford and Huddersfield of Super League, fellow Championship side Featherstone Rovers, and Pennines rivals Oldham and Rochdale. The club's traditional home colours are blue and white hoops, white shorts, and blue and white socks.

The club's parent company, Halifax Rugby League Football Club Limited, was placed into liquidation in February 2026 and the club's membership of the Rugby Football League terminated two days later. On 3 March, The RFL granted membership approval for a new Halifax Panthers club.

== History ==
=== 1873–1939: early years ===
The club was founded as Halifax in 1873 when a group of young men from the Halifax Rifle Volunteers put an advert in the local press to invite anyone interested in "football" to a meeting at the Upper George Hotel.

A year later, Halifax played their first inter-club rugby football game when they played Leeds Athletic Club in a match held at Woodhouse Moor in Leeds on the 21st of November 1874. This first game resulted in a draw. The first home game was played a month later against Wakefield Trinity on a cricket field in King Cross Street, which again resulted in a draw. In these early years, matches were played at Ovenden, Savile Park and Hanson Lane.

After winning the first Yorkshire Cup in 1878 beating York in the final at Leeds, they went on to win it on another four occasions. Several players were picked for the Yorkshire County side in these years, and five were for the England rugby union team. In 1886, the club moved to Thrum Hall, which would be their home ground for the next 112 years. The first game there was played on 18 September 1886 against Hull F.C. and drew 8,000 spectators.

After the 1890-91 season, Halifax along with other Yorkshire Senior clubs Batley, Bradford, Brighouse, Dewsbury, Huddersfield, Hull, Hunslet, Leeds, Liversedge, Manningham and Wakefield decided that they wanted their own county league starting in 1891 along the lines of a similar competition that had been played in Lancashire. The clubs wanted full control of the league but the Yorkshire Rugby Football Union would not sanction the competition as it meant giving up control of rugby football to the senior clubs.

Halifax were founding members of the breakaway Northern Rugby Football Union in 1895 when leading rugby clubs in Yorkshire and Lancashire left the Rugby Football Union over issues related to leglising payments to players and playing in competitive leagues. In 1896, Halifax lost out on winning the first ever Rugby Football League Championship by a single point, with Manningham becoming the inaugural champions. In 1902–03, they achieved the 'double' by winning the Challenge Cup and finishing top of Division One. They won the cup again the following season, and were the first ever Championship play-off winners in 1906–07.

Halifax won their first Wembley Challenge Cup final in 1931, beating York F.C. 22–8. An estimated 100,000 people lined the route to a civic reception at the town hall.

Towards the end of the 1937 season, Streatham and Mitcham folded after just one full season in the league. The club had made a number of high-profile signings from the New Zealand All Blacks, including George Nēpia and Charles Smith, and these players now joined Halifax.

In 1938, Halifax reached the semi-final of the Challenge Cup, after winning three replays in a row, before they were knocked out by Barrow at Fartown, Huddersfield in the dying seconds of the game.

In 1939, Halifax became the last team to win the Challenge Cup final before the war. Favourites Salford were beaten 20–3 in front of a record 55,453 spectators.

During the Second World War, Halifax reached the Challenge cup finals in 1941 and 1942, but lost both times to Leeds in matches held at Odsal.

=== Post–Second World War ===
In 1947, Halifax's Hudson Irving died from a heart attack while playing at Dewsbury.

In 1949, Halifax's David Craven died after breaking his neck playing against Workington Town.

The 1949 Challenge Cup final was sold out for the first time as 95,050 spectators saw Bradford Northern beat Halifax.

In the 1950s, Halifax were Championship runners-up three times, beat Hull F.C. in Yorkshire Cup finals in 1954 and 1955, and were Yorkshire League winners in 1950, 1953, 1954 and 1956. Halifax were unbeaten at their home ground of Thrum Hall between December 1952 and November 1956. They played in a Wembley final of the 1953–54 Challenge Cup, featuring in the first ever drawn final against Warrington in 1954, losing in the replay at Odsal Stadium, Bradford in front of what was then a world record rugby league crowd officially given as 102,569, although estimates suggest another 20,000 plus entered unofficially.

After securing a Yorkshire league and cup double in 1955–56, the club was in sight of winning "All Four Cups". Wembley was reached after an 11–10 Challenge Cup semi-final victory over Wigan at Odsal and Halifax beat St. Helens 23–8 in the Championship semi-final. However, St Helens ran out 13–2 winners in the Challenge Cup and a week later, Halifax lost in the Championship match against Hull at Maine Road, Manchester, a last minute penalty goal securing a 10–9 victory for Hull.

In 1959, Halifax hosted Wigan before a club record 29,153 people in the third round of the Challenge Cup.

Halifax won their third Championship in 1964–65 after finishing 7th in the league table and progressing through the new 16-team play-offs. They became Champions by beating St Helens 15–7 in the Championship Final held at Station Road, Swinton. Terry Fogerty of Halifax was awarded the Harry Sunderland Trophy for man-of-the-match.

In 1965–66 Halifax again reached the Championship Final through the play-offs, after finishing 10th in the league table. Their opponents were again St Helens who this time ran out comfortable winners by 35–12.

=== 1960–1996: financial difficulties ===
Halifax was hit hard by revenue shortfalls during the late 1960s, and 1970s. Fortunes on the pitch suffered as the shortfall was met by selling players. In 1970, a concert was held at Thrum Hall in an attempt to alleviate these financial troubles. Horrific weather conditions meant that only around 3,000 arrived to watch the Halifax Pop and Blues Concert which made a loss of £6,000.

Despite victory in the inaugural Regal Trophy Final (called the Players No. 6 Trophy for sponsorship purposes) in 1971–72, financial problems continued for the next decade. In 1983, local businessman, David Brook provided much needed investment in the club.

The 1977–78 season saw Halifax hit rock bottom with a losing streak of 24 consecutive defeats, including a game against amateurs Cawoods. Fax won only two matches all season and finished bottom of the rugby league pyramid.

Chris Anderson was player-coach of Halifax from November 1984 to May 1987, then he retired from playing but remained as coach in 1987–88. He brought over Australian internationals such as Graham Eadie and Tony Anderson. The team climbed out of the Second Division, won the League Championship in 1985–86, the 1986–87 Challenge Cup against St. Helens and made a second successive appearance in the Challenge Cup final in 1988 when they lost to Wigan. Despite this on-field success, Halifax were banned from signing new players by the RFL after complaints of non-payments in November 1988.

In 1989, John Dorahy took up a position as captain-coach of Halifax for the 1989–90 season. Halifax players threatened strike action over unpaid wages in April 1990. The club sold Neil James for £20,000 to pay wages but were still in financial trouble including an unpaid tax bill of £70,000. Halifax went into the hands of receivers, £760,000 in debt, a take-over bid having failed after the players refused to take a pay cut. The club was re-formed and the assets were purchased by the Marsland/Gartland consortium of local businessmen.

Peter Roe was appointed as head coach at Halifax for 1990–91, during which the team achieved promotion to the First Division along with Salford, who were their opponents in the Second Division Final at Old Trafford. During this season, in October 1990, the club set its still current record victory – an 82–8 win over Runcorn Highfield at Thrum Hall.

Roe was removed from office 24-hours after the 1991 Final, when he refused to a demand that he re-apply for his own job; the Halifax board had told him that he did not have the required experience for a club in the top division, and would have to stand against other new applicants. Roger Millward took the coaching job at Halifax, but was only there 17 months before resigning. Mal Reilly became the coach in 1992. In August 1993, in financial trouble again, Halifax put seven players on the transfer list for a total of £170,000.

=== 1996–2002: summer era ===
In 1996, the first tier of British rugby league clubs played the inaugural Super League season and changed from a winter to a summer season. In the lead-up, the Halifax President, Tony Gartland, and former Chairman, Peter Marsland, left the board over plans to merge with rivals Bradford Northern and join the proposed Super League as single club.

Halifax joined the Super League in 1996, the local newspaper did a poll of suggested nicknames for the club with Halifax Bombers topping the list. But the Board upon the recommendation of Chief executive Nigel Wood chose Halifax Blue Sox. However, this proved to be unpopular with most supporters who continued to refer to them as 'Fax'. Halifax finished third in Super League in 1998 under John Pendlebury.

Halifax sold Thrum Hall for £1.5 million to Asda for a supermarket development in 1998, and moved across town to their present home, the Shay stadium, which they shared with the town's football club Halifax Town. The proceeds from the sale were supposed to enable Halifax RLFC to make a contribution to the costs of a redevelopment of the Shay stadium, but the money was swallowed up by debts.

Under Chief Executive Nigel Wood, Halifax went to Jacksonville University, Florida, in 2000 to help develop American rugby league, along with Salford.

Steve Linnane joined the club as assistant coach from Rochdale Hornets and took full charge after Gary Mercer's resignation. With the club threatened again by financial problems and the danger of relegation Halifax sacked coach Steve Linnane in August 2002, the morning after a 64–0 loss to St. Helens, which came after nine losses from ten games which put the club at risk of relegation. Replacement Tony Anderson signed a deal that covered the four remaining matches of this season.

=== 2003–2008: relegation and financial difficulties ===
The club returned to their traditional Halifax RLFC name at the start of 2003. At the end of the 2003 season they were relegated from Super League to National League One. Halifax's financial troubles meant they were unable to retain a full-time team and they struggled in the new league. In 2004 having been saved from insolvency by their new chairman Howard Posner they narrowly avoided a second relegation to National League 2, with a last-gasp victory in a play-off with York City Knights.

Anthony Farrell was asked to become temporary coach until the end of the year following the sacking of Tony Anderson. After saving the club from relegation the following season and taking the club within a whisker of a place in the grand final, they lost out to Castleford. The year after was less successful and after a poor series of results including a club record loss to Hull Kingston Rovers, Farrell lost his job. Martin Hall took over the role of head coach in June 2006.

In August 2006, Halifax was on the verge of going bust. The club announced that it needed to raise £90,000 or it would go into liquidation. Rugby league fans nationwide rallied behind 'Fax', and through visits to the ground during home fixtures and other fund-raising events, were able to raise £55,000. Howard Posner then came forward and announced that he would loan the club the remaining £35,000 in order to keep Halifax alive, repayment of the loan was waived. Posner and the new board of directors subsequently invested further sums to ensure the club could survive and that Halifax would be playing in National League One during 2007. Howard Posner, again became club Chairman and Martin Hall took up the post of director of football in October 2006. Assistant coach Matt Calland was then named the new head coach of Halifax.

=== 2009–2025: rebuilding and championship success ===
In the 2009 Challenge Cup Halifax came within moments of reaching the quarter-finals, losing by one point in extra time to Castleford. They also lost the final of the Co-Operative Championship to Barrow 26-18. However, Barrow were later stripped of the title due to salary cap breaches. In April 2010, with the club on a sound financial footing, Howard Posner stepped down as chairman and was replaced by long time supporter and director Michael Steele. In 2010, Halifax won the Co-Operative Championship, beating Featherstone Rovers 23–22 in the final after extra time. It was the first trophy Halifax had won in 23 years. But the club were not promoted back to Super League as promotion to super league was on a franchise basis at that time.

In 2011, Halifax reached the Northern Rail Cup Final at Bloomfield Road, Blackpool, losing narrowly to Leigh in the last minute. They were also unable to defend their Championship title, losing heavily to Sheffield Eagles in the play-offs. Karl Harrison took over as head coach at the end of the season.

The following season, Halifax made it to the final of the Northern Rail Cup but this time were victorious over favourites Featherstone Rovers beating them 21–12 in a match watched by over 7,000 spectators. In 2015 Halifax finished the regular season in the top four of the Championship, earning them a place in the qualifiers. Despite being the lowest ranked team in the competition, and part-time, they beat promotion favourites Leigh and Sheffield Eagles to finish 6th out of 8, and secured improved central funding for 2016.

After a disappointing 6th place finish in 2016, the club again reached the qualifiers in 2017 and 2018 finishing 3rd and 4th respectively. This made the club the most successful part-time team in the RFL. Long serving director and chairman Michael Steele stepped down from the Board at the end of 2017.

In December 2020, Halifax RLFC adopted the name Halifax Panthers. In the 2021 Championship season, Halifax Panthers finished in third place and qualified for the play-offs. After defeating Whitehaven in the first week, Halifax travelled to Featherstone with the winner to play Toulouse Olympique in the Million Pound Game. Halifax would lose the match 42-10 which ended their season. It was also the final game for the retiring Scott Grix. In the 2022 RFL Championship season, Halifax finished third and qualified for the play-offs. However, they would be eliminated in the first week of the play-offs by York City losing 26-24.

In September 2024, the club was threatened with closure due to an outstanding bill to HMRC. On 11 September 2024, the club managed to stave off liquidation after paying their outstanding debt to the HMRC.

Halifax started the 2025 RFL Championship season in fine form winning their opening six matches of the campaign. They would eventually finish the 2025 RFL Championship season in 5th place on the table.

=== 2026–present: liquidation and resurrection ===
Off the field the situation was not good. A further winding-up petition was issued against the club in 2025, again for debts due to HMRC. This time the club was not able to stave off the liquidation and a winding-up order against the Panthers parent company, Halifax Rugby League Football Club Limited, was made on 9 February 2026.

Two days later, the club's membership of the RFL was terminated. At the same time, an application to transfer the RFL membership to a new company Halifax RLFC (Trading) Ltd was refused, but three expressions of interest in forming a new club were identified.

On 3 March 2026, the RFL announced that they had granted membership approval for a new Halifax Panthers club and that they would be re-instated to the 2026 Championship but with a 12-point deduction.

The new owners retained coach, Kyle Eastmond, and re-signed the 14 players whose contracts expired and had not yet signed contracts with other clubs.

== Stadiums ==
=== 1886–1998: Thrum Hall ===
Shortly after they were founded in 1873, Halifax bought some land in Halifax from a farmer with the aim to build a multipurpose sports venue. Thrum Hall hosted rugby league finals and test matches as well as speedway. Halifax played at Thrum Hall for 112 years, until they sold the land for £1.5 million to ASDA to move to a new stadium in the Super League era.

Thrum Hall was notable for its distinctive slope. As it was built on the side of a hill, the ground had a four yard slope from the main grandstand side to the outer wing.

Thrum Hall had a spectator capacity of 9,832 when it closed as a sports venue.

=== 1998–present: The Shay ===
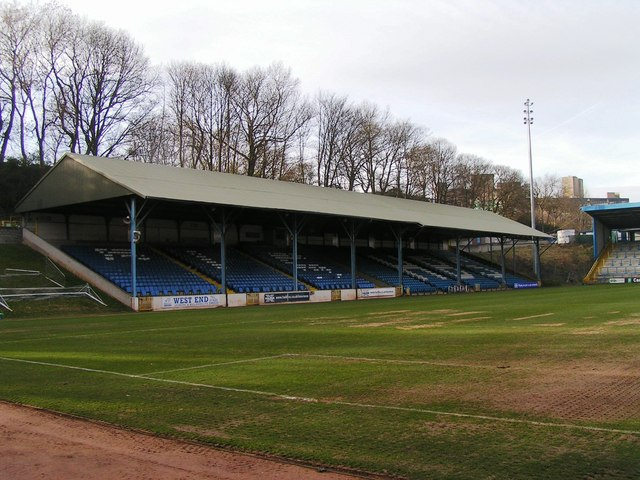
Skircoat Stand

Halifax played their first game at The Shay on Friday 10th April 1998 against Huddersfield Giants in the 1998 Super League season and ground shared with association football team Halifax Town. The Shay has a current capacity of 14,061 (5,830 seated).

The Shay hosted games during the 2013 Rugby League World Cup.

== Colours and badge ==
=== Colours ===
Halifax have traditionally played in blue and white. Their home jersey is blue and hoops and their away colours have been in recent seasons a combination of red, black and white, replacing their traditional red and white hoops.

=== Badge ===
Halifax Blue Sox club logo

Since its formation in 1873, Halifax used the town's coat of arms as a crest as many other clubs did until the advent of Super League, Halifax and many other clubs, changed their names and badge thus becoming known as the Halifax Blue Sox from the 1996 season. This however was unpopular with fans and the name was reverted to 'Halifax' and the town coat of arms was reintroduced with Halifax under it. Since rebranding to Halifax Panthers in 2021, the club have used their current updated badge.

== Kit manufacturers and sponsors ==
Years	Kit Manufacturer	Main Shirt Sponsor
1986	5D Togs	FKI
1987–1990	5D Togs	Websters Yorkshire Bitter
1990–1992	Ellgren	Websters Yorkshire Bitter
1993–1995	Stag	Marshalls
1996	Stag	Computacenter
1997–1999	Avec	Computacenter
2000–2001	Mizuno	Computacenter
2002–2003	Gilbert	Evening Courier
2004–2006	Halbro	Halifax
2007	Canterbury	Halifax
2008–2010	Surridge	Halifax
2011	XBlades	Probiz
2012	XBlades	Reactiv
2013–2014	1HX Sports	Reactiv
2015	EV2 Sportswear	Reactiv
2016	EV2 Sportswear	MBI Consulting
2017	EV2 Sportswear	Northern Powerhouse Developments
2018	Errea	Northern Powerhouse Developments
2019	Samurai	Northern Powerhouse Developments
2020-	Ellgren	Eclipse Energy
2022-	Cre8tive	Eclipse Energy
2024-	OROX Teamwear	Eclipse Energy

== 2027 squad ==
2027 Halifax Panthers squad
First team squad			Coaching staff
(England) Harvey Braddish – SR; (Jamaica) Darius Carter – CE; (England) Leon Cowen – PR; (Wales) Connor Davies – LF, SR; (Wales) Curtis Davies – HK, SH; (Ireland) Riley Dean – SO, SH; (England) Brandon Douglas – PR, SR; (England) Jacob Fairbank – LF, PR, SR; (England) Ben Forster – SR	(England) Charlie Graham – CE, WG; (Australia) Braydon Guyan – LF; (Jamaica) Elijah Hylton – CE; (Ireland) Zack McComb – CE, WG; (Australia) Beau Newlands – CE, WG; (Wales) Charlie Newton – HK, SO; (England) Adam O'Brien (vc) – HK; (Nigeria) Dan Okoro – PR	(England) Alfie Sinclair – PR; (England) Luckas Stableman-Blue – WG; (England) Riley Thompson – HK; (England) Ben Tibbs – WG, CE; (England) Eugene Tinibu – CE, WG; (Jamaica) AJ Wallace – SR; (England) Wade White – SO, SH, FB; (England) Ben Will – WG, CE, FB; (Australia) Harry Wilson – SH, SO	Head coach: (England) Kyle Eastmond; Assistant coach: (Jamaica) Jy-mel Coleman; Legend: (c) Captain(s); (vc) Vice-captain(s); Updated: Source(s): https://halifaxpanthers.co.uk/teams/players/index.html

== 2027 transfers ==
=== Gains ===
Player	From	Contract	Date
(England) Charlie Graham	Hunslet RLFC	1 year	3 September 2026
(Ireland) Riley Dean	Bradford Bulls	1 year	21 September 2026
(England) Brandon Douglas	Bradford Bulls	1 year	13 October 2026
(Jamaica) AJ Wallace	Toulouse Olympique	1 year	22 September 2026
(England) Leon Cowen	St Helens	1 year	7 October 2026
(England) Alfie Sinclair	St Helens	1 year	2 November 2026
(England) Harvey Braddish	St Helens	1 year	3 November 2026
(England) Luckas Stableman-Blue	St Helens	1 year	18 November 2026
(Australia) Braydon Guyan	Ipswich Jets	2 years	19 October 2026
(Australia) Beau Newlands	Ipswich Jets	1 year	19 October 2026
(Australia) Harry Wilson	North Sydney Bears	2 years	19 October 2026
(Wales) Charlie Newton	Huddersfield Giants	1 year	3 November 2026
(England) Eugene Tinibu	Huddersfield Giants	1 year	13 November 2026
(Jamaica) Elijah Hylton	Wakefield Trinity	1 year	5 November 2026
(England) Wade White	Leeds Rhinos	1 year	5 November 2026

=== Losses ===
Player	To	Contract	Date
(England) Alfie Johnson	Castleford Tigers	2 years	17 July 2026
(Jamaica) Delaine Gittens-Bedward	Leeds Rhinos	1 year	20 October 2026
(England) Lloyd Roby	Swinton Lions	1 year	27 October 2026
(England) William Calcott			21 November 2026
(England) Vila Halafihi			21 November 2026
(England) Myles Lawford	Wakefield Trinity	End of loan - Return to parent club	21 November 2026
(Jamaica) Jimmy Morgan			21 November 2026
(Serbia) Jesse Soric			21 November 2026
(Cook Islands) Adam Tangata	Sporting Olympique Avignon	Player-coach	21 November 2026

=== Retired ===
Player	Date
(Australia) Owen McCarron	22 July 2026
(England) Ben Crooks	1 September 2026

== Staff ==
=== Coaching team ===
Nationality	Name	Position
(England)	Kyle Eastmond	Head Coach
(Jamaica)	Jy-Mel Coleman	Assistant Coach
(England)	Tabo Madiri	Assistant Coach

=== Past coaches ===
Also see Category:Halifax Panthers coaches.

- Arthur Atkinson 1948-49
- Albert Fearnley 1964-65
- Jack Scroby 197?
- Les Pearce 197?-80
- Maurice Bamford 1978-80
- Ken Roberts 1982
- Colin Dixon 1982–84
- Chris Anderson 1984–88
- Ross Strudwick 1988–89
- John Dorahy 1989–90
- Peter Roe 1991–92
- Roger Millward 1992
- Mal Reilly 1993–94
- Steve Simms 1994–96
- John Pendlebury 1997–98
- Gary Mercer 1999-00
- Steve Linnane 2001
- Tony Anderson 2002-04
- Anthony Farrell 2004-06
- Martin Hall 2006
- Matt Calland 2008–11
- Karl Harrison 2012-14
- Richard Marshall 2015-19
- Simon Grix 2019–23
- Liam Finn 2024
- Kyle Eastmond 2025-present

== Youth and community development ==
Activities:

Blue Base Study Support Centre was a community sporting initiative sponsored by Halifax, and part of the national Playing For Success educational scheme launched for school pupils to interact with professional sports teams, to help provide motivation to young people. Locally, Blue Base was working with an initiative established by the DfES, in partnership with Calderdale Children and Young People's Services and Halifax. The funding ceased in March 2011, when the Blue Base Centre closed.

The centre existed to support Calderdale schools in their drive to raise attainment levels with their pupils. This is achieved by developing young peoples' levels of motivation, self-esteem and helping them to have a more positive attitude towards learning by concentrating particularly upon literacy, numeracy and the use of ICT.

Retired player, Frank Watene, leads Calderdale Community Coaching Trust which is the club's Foundation providing a wide range of educational programmes designed to promote physical activity and healthy lifestyles amongst people of all ages in the Calderdale area. Activities include Touch Rugby League, healthy heart circuit training and an 'Over 50s Club which plays Kurling at the Shay stadium.

The Panthers have a partnership with official education partners Calderdale College, running both men's and women's academy sides for college students. They also run an official talent pathway scheme covering age groups for Under 14s, Under 15s and Under 16s boys.

== Mascots ==
Original Mascot: (100 years ago) Smut the Cat

Previous Mascots: Billy & Bluey, Fat Cat (fl. 2001), Halicat (2006–2020)

Present Mascots: Paddy and Pippa Panther (2023–)

== Seasons ==
=== Super League era ===
Season	League									Play-offs	Challenge Cup	Other competitions		Name	Tries	Name	Points
Season	Division	P	W	D	L	F	A	Pts	Pos	Play-offs	Challenge Cup	Other competitions		Top try scorer		Top point scorer	
1996	Super League	22	10	1	11	667	576	21	6th		QF						
1997	Super League	22	8	2	12	524	549	18	7th		R5						
1998	Super League	23	18	0	5	658	390	36	3rd	Lost in Semi Final	R5						
1999	Super League	30	11	0	19	573	792	22	9th		R5						
2000	Super League	28	11	1	16	664	703	23	8th		QF						
2001	Super League	28	9	0	19	630	819	18	9th		R5						
2002	Super League	28	8	0	20	558	856	16	9th		QF						
2003	Super League	28	1	0	27	372	1227	0	12th		R4						
2004	National League One	18	7	0	11	426	492	14	9th		R4						
2005	National League One	18	10	0	8	604	467	20	4th	Lost in Preliminary Final	R5						
2006	National League One	18	7	0	11	461	508	14	7th		R4						
2007	National League One	18	12	0	6	616	421	38	3rd		R4						
2008	National League One	18	11	1	6	634	514	38	3rd		R4						
2009	Championship	20	13	0	7	714	476	43	2nd	Lost in Final	R5						
2010	Championship	20	16	0	4	684	509	50	2nd	Won in Final	DQ						
2011	Championship	20	10	0	10	569	543	36	6th	Lost in Semi Final	R4	Championship Cup	RU				
2012	Championship	18	14	0	4	597	377	44	3rd	Lost in Semi Final	R5	Championship Cup	W				
2013	Championship	26	19	2	5	817	476	62	3rd	Lost in Semi Final	R5						
2014	Championship	26	16	2	8	714	504	58	3rd		R4						
2015	Championship	23	16	0	7	646	377	32	4th		R5						
2015	The Qualifiers	7	2	0	5	162	186	4	6th		R5						
2016	Championship	23	13	1	9	615	484	27	6th	Lost in Shield Semi Final	R6						
2016	Championship Shield	30	16	1	13	775	656	33	2nd	Lost in Shield Semi Final	R6						
2017	Championship	23	16	0	7	567	357	32	4th		R6						
2017	The Qualifiers	7	0	0	7	82	210	0	8th		R6						
2018	Championship	23	16	1	6	643	416	33	4th		R4						
2018	The Qualifiers	7	0	0	7	68	225	0	8th		R4						
2019	Championship	27	10	1	16	602	685	21	8th		SF	1895 Cup	R2				
2020	Championship (Note: The 2020 Championship was abandoned due to the COVID-19 pandemic in the United Kingdom. Statistics shown are those at time of abandonment and are not official.)	4	2	0	2	82	73	4	8th		R4						
2021	Championship	21	13	0	8	528	354	26	3rd	Lost in Semi Final	R3 (Note: Officially round 1 due to the competitions temporary restructure in 2021.)	1895 Cup	R1				
2022	Championship	27	20	0	7	837	442	40	3rd	Lost in Elimination Playoffs	R4						
2023	Championship	27	14	1	12	690	572	29	8th		R6	1895 Cup	W				
2024	Championship	26	11	0	15	509	650	22	9th		R6	1895 Cup	GS				
2025	Championship	24	14	1	9	594	424	29	5th	Lost in Semi Final	R3	1895 Cup	R1				
2026	Championship	24	8	0	16	558	668	4	19th		R3	1895 Cup	DNE				

== Honours ==
Major titles

Competition	Wins	Years won
RFL Championship / Super League	4	1902–03, 1906–07, 1964–65, 1985–86
Challenge Cup	5	1902–03, 1903–04, 1930–31, 1938–39, 1986–87

Other titles

Competition	Wins	Years won
League Cup	1	1971–72
RFL Yorkshire League	6	1908–09, 1920–21, 1952–53, 1953–54, 1955–56, 1957–58
RFL Yorkshire Cup	5	1908–09, 1944–45, 1954–55, 1955–56, 1963–64
RFU Yorkshire Cup	5	1878, 1886, 1888, 1893, 1894
Charity Shield	1	1986–87
Championship Cup	1	2012
RFL 1895 Cup	1	2023

== All-time statistics ==
=== Match ===
Goals: 14, Bruce Burton at Hunslet, 27 August 1972
Tries: 8, Keith Williams v Dewsbury, 9 November 1957
Points: 34, Joe Keyes, v Workington 17 July 2022

=== Season ===
Goals: 156 Graham Holroyd 2008
Tries: 48, Johnny Freeman 1956–57
Points: 362, John Schuster 1994–95

=== Career ===
Goals: 1,028, Ronnie James 1960–72
Tries: 290, Johnny Freeman 1954–67
Points: 2,191, Ronnie James 1960–72

=== Halifax appearances ===
Career: Stan Kielty 482 (1946–58)
Season: John Thorley 48 (1956–57)
Consecutive: Dick Davies 108 (1925–28)

=== Representative appearances ===
Great Britain: Karl Harrison 11
Great Britain: Ken Roberts 10
Great Britain: Charlie Renilson 8
England: Alvin Ackerley 6
Wales: Arthur Daniels 13
Yorkshire: Archie Rigg 14
Lancashire: Ken Roberts 4
Cumberland: Alvin Ackerley 13

=== Highest score ===
94–0 v North Wales Crusaders (RFL Championship) 21 June 2026

=== Biggest loss ===
6–88 v Hull KR (Northern Rail Cup) 23 April 2006

=== Record crowd ===
- Thrum Hall: 29,153 vs Wigan (Challenge Cup), 21 March 1959
- The Shay: 9,827 vs Bradford Bulls (Challenge Cup), 12 March 2000
- All-time: 102,569 vs Warrington, 5 May 1954 at Odsal Stadium – 1954 Challenge Cup Final Replay
- vs International touring team: 18,773 vs Australia, 20 September 1952 – 1952–53 Kangaroo Tour

All club statistics are courtesy of Andrew Hardcastle (Official Club Historian)(amendments required)
