= 2025 Salford Red Devils season =

English rugby league team season

Salford Red Devils 2025 season
- 2025 Super League season Rank: 12th
- Play-off result: Did not qualify
- Challenge Cup: Quarter-finals
- 2025 record: Wins: 5; draws: 0; losses: 25
- Points scored: For: 234; against: 1129

Team information
- CEO: Paul King (until 7 February); Chris Irwin (7 February-6 May); Paul King (from 12 May)
- Head Coach: Paul Rowley
- Captain: Kallum Watkins (until Round 6) Ryan Brierley (Round 6-Round 20) TBC (from Round 21)
- Stadium: Salford Community Stadium
- Avg. attendance: 4,235
- High attendance: 5,798; Leeds Rhinos, 22 February
- Low attendance: 2,051; Castleford Tigers, 13 July

Top scorers
- Tries: Justin Sangaré (4)
- Goals: Rowan Milnes (12)
- Points: Chris Hankinson (28)
| Home colours | Away colours | Third colours |
| ← 2024 | List of seasons | 2026 (Salford RLFC) → |

The 2025 season was the Salford Red Devils' sixteenth consecutive season playing in England's top division of rugby league. They competed in the 2025 Super League season and the 2025 Challenge Cup. This was Salford's last season before the club was wound up by the High Court of Justice and entered liquidation over unpaid debts on 3 December 2025.

== Financial difficulties ==
=== Club takeover ===
Salford's 2025 season was marred by financial difficulties relating to a lack of revenue from Salford City Council following their takeover of the Salford Community Stadium. In November 2024, Salford CEO Paul King asked the owners of the other eleven Super League clubs to approve a £500,000 advancement of central funding, covering staff and player wages as well as club revenues, in order to prevent the club's insolvency by the end of the year. The funding advancement was agreed by both the clubs and the RFL's marketing branch RL Commercial later in the month.

As a consequence of the funding advancement, the RFL appointed financial regulators, including former Wakefield Trinity owner Michael Carter, to oversee Salford's finances. In December 2024, a sustainability cap was imposed on Salford, requiring around £700,000, or up to 40% of the club's expenses, to be cut, necessitating plans being prepared for the sale of players.

On 7 February 2025, a week prior to the commencement of the 2025 Super League season, Salford announced that subject to final approval by the RFL, the club had been taken over by Dario Berta, the Swiss CEO of investment bank Matanel, with the sale claimed to clear over £1.5 million in debts owed to Salford City Council. Club CEO Paul King was replaced by former Salford and Exeter City F.C. chief commercial officer Chris Irwin.

=== Nonpayment of players ===
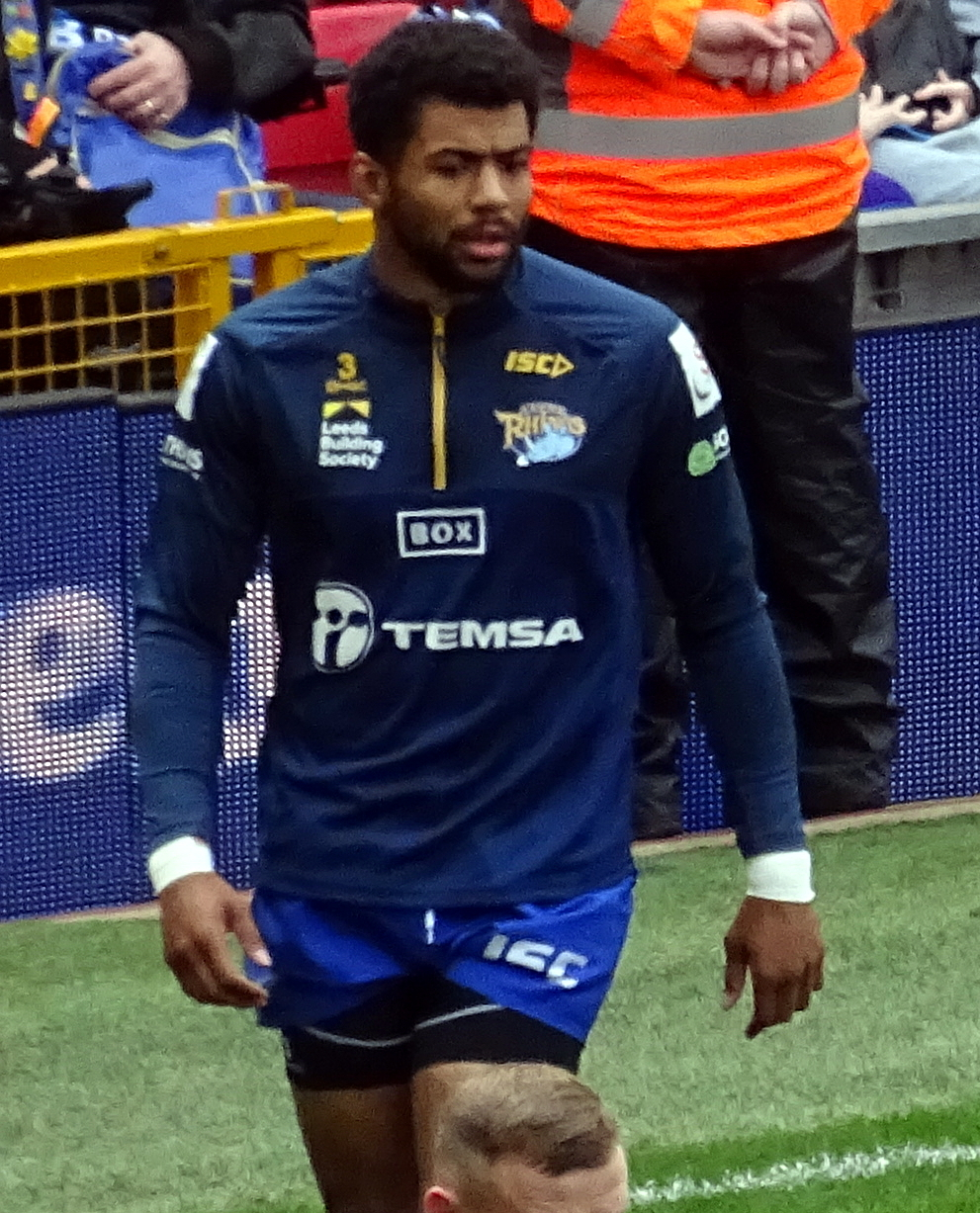
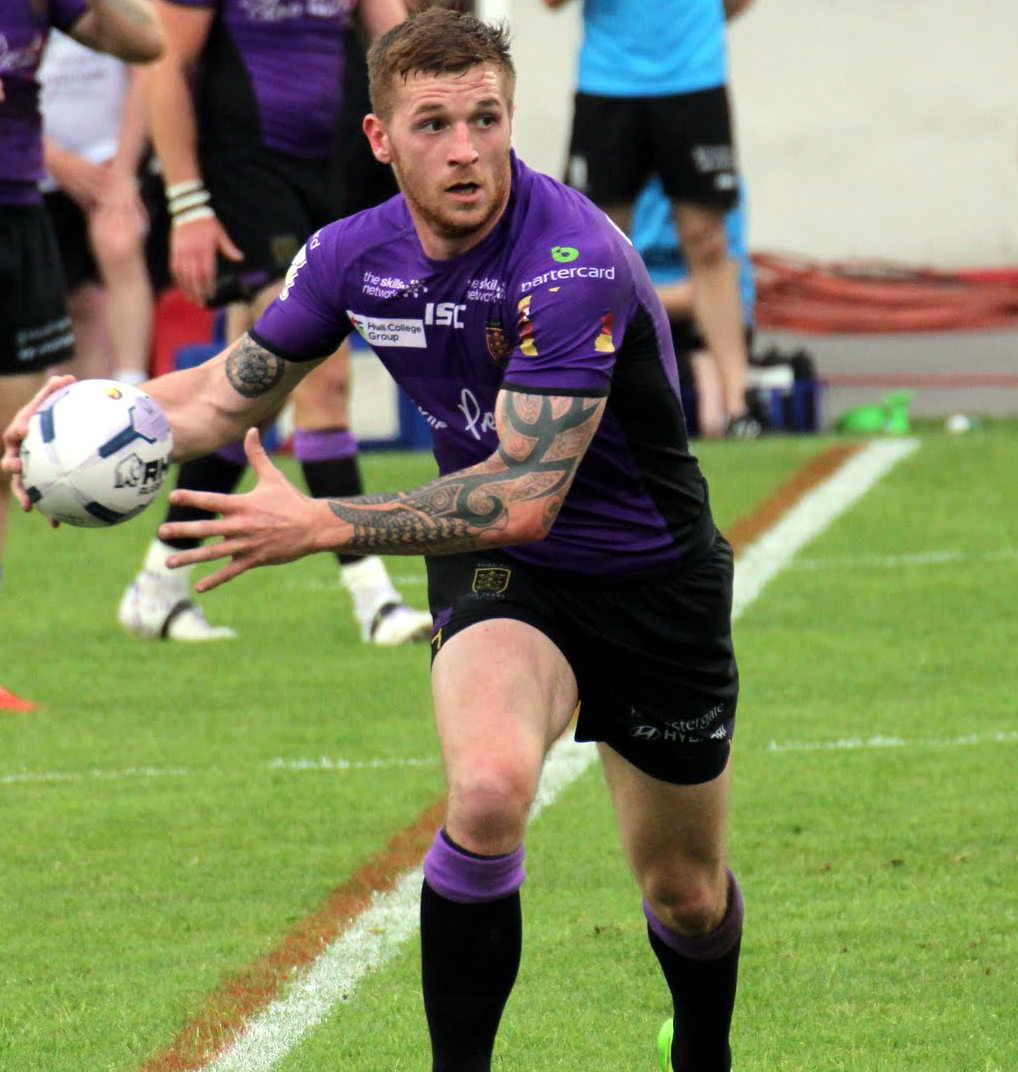
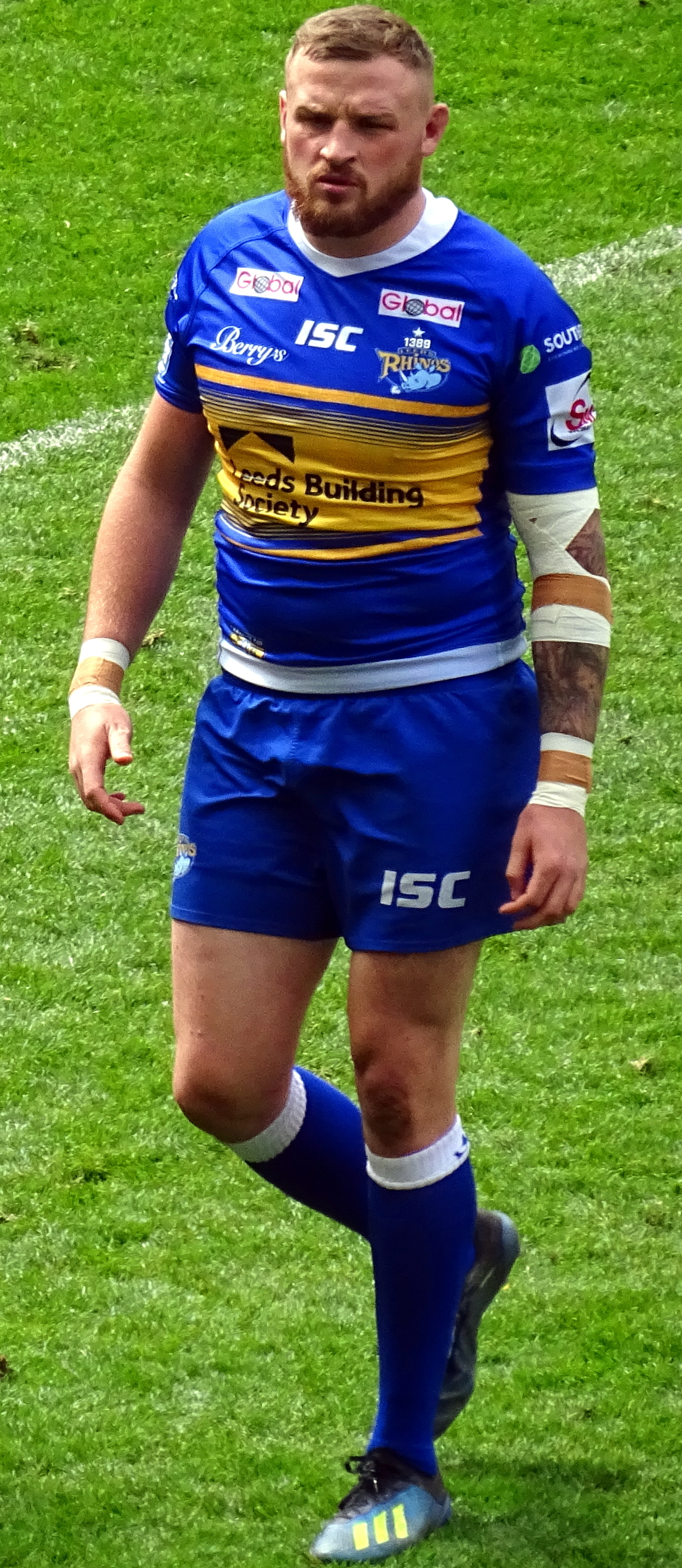
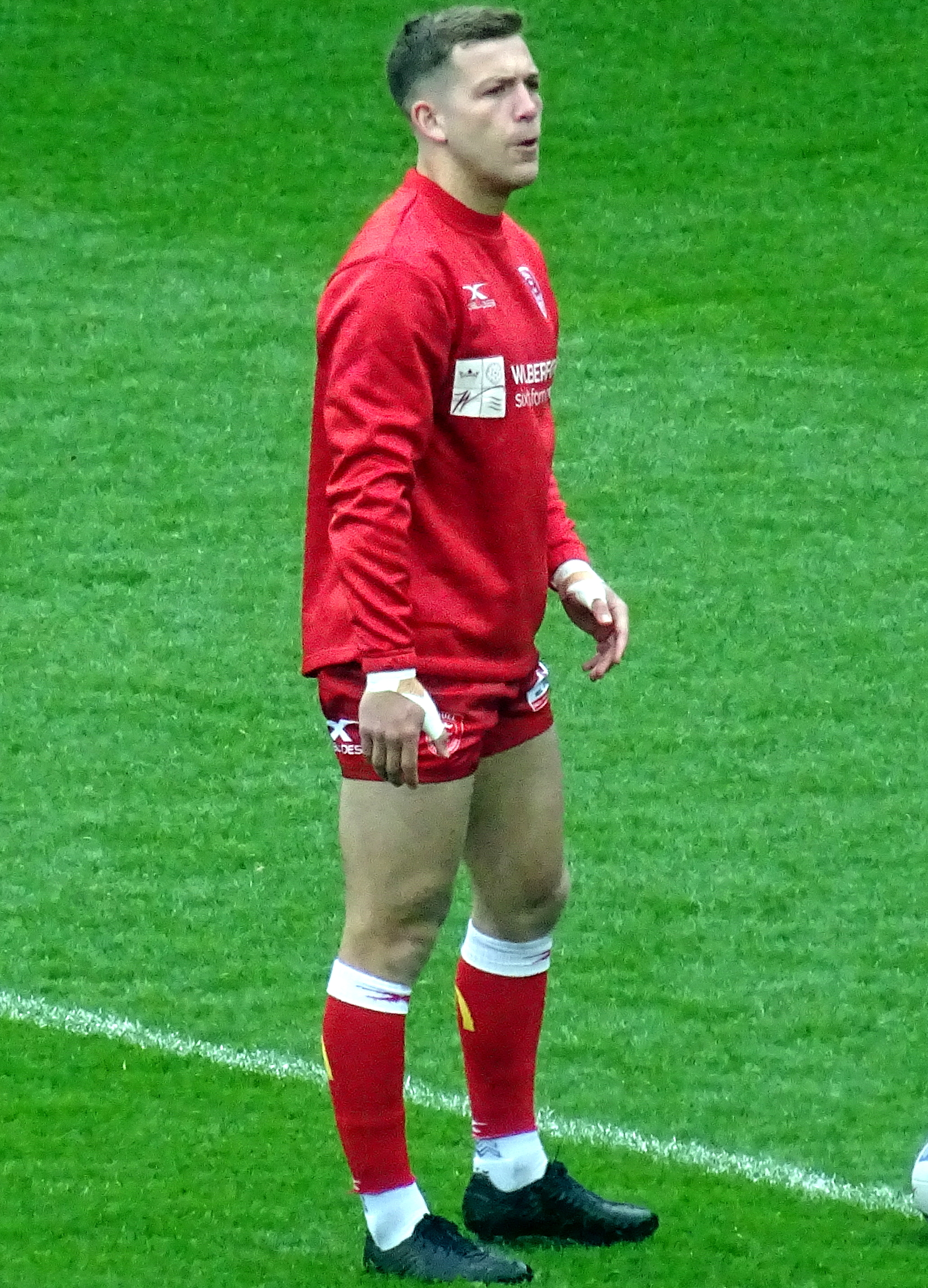
Club captain Kallum Watkins, as well as scrum-half Marc Sneyd, prop Brad Singleton and Chris Atkin all left the club between March and May 2025

In their Round 1 Super League fixture against St Helens on 14 February, as a result of sustainability cap restrictions and delays in the final approval of the club's takeover, Salford controversially fielded a squad of only 16 players, with only three senior squad members - Joe Bullock, Tiaki Chan and Ben Hellewell - present as substitutes, the remainder filled with Salford's reserves. The match, which aired on BBC Two as the BBC's first live broadcast pick of the 2025 season, ended 82-0, the highest Super League winning margin since Salford were beaten 92-12 by the Bradford Bulls in the 2000 season. A compliance investigation into Salford's squad selection was launched by the RFL on the Monday following the game.

Following Salford's Round 3 fixture against Hull Kingston Rovers on 27 February, it was revealed that Salford's players had not been paid on time throughout February, causing the players to announce intentions to refuse to attend training until their wages were paid, with some additionally threatening to refuse to play their Round 4 fixture against the Castleford Tigers on 7 March before later coming to an agreement with the club. After it had been lifted following the approval of Dario Berta's takeover, Salford's £1.2 million sustainability cap was reimposed due to the nonpayment of wages, and as a result, players Marc Sneyd and Brad Singleton left the club for the Warrington Wolves and the Castleford Tigers respectively, with Tim Lafai additionally being released to return home to his family in Australia.

The club's players were not paid on time again in March amid an injury crisis that took the first team squad selection to 15 players. Club captain Kallum Watkins and Chris Atkin, who left the club for Leeds Rhinos and Castleford Tigers respectively later that month, were reported to have refused to play their Round 6 fixture against Wigan Warriors as a result, each being threatened with a £2,000 fine and the withholding of their player registration by the RFL. CEO Chris Irwin admitted in April that the club's debts to Salford City Council were not cleared by the sale to Dario Berta in February and also stated that an ownership consortium running the club, consisting of Saia Kalahi and Kurt Graver, "are not rugby league people", instead suggesting that they are more interested in developing the land surrounding the Salford Community Stadium and granting the Red Devils 20% ownership of the stadium. Irwin later resigned as CEO on 6 May after less than three months in the position, with Paul King returning to the club in an "advisory position", having paid players' wages despite not being a member of Salford's staff and put up his house as collateral against the club's debts.

=== Winding-up petition ===
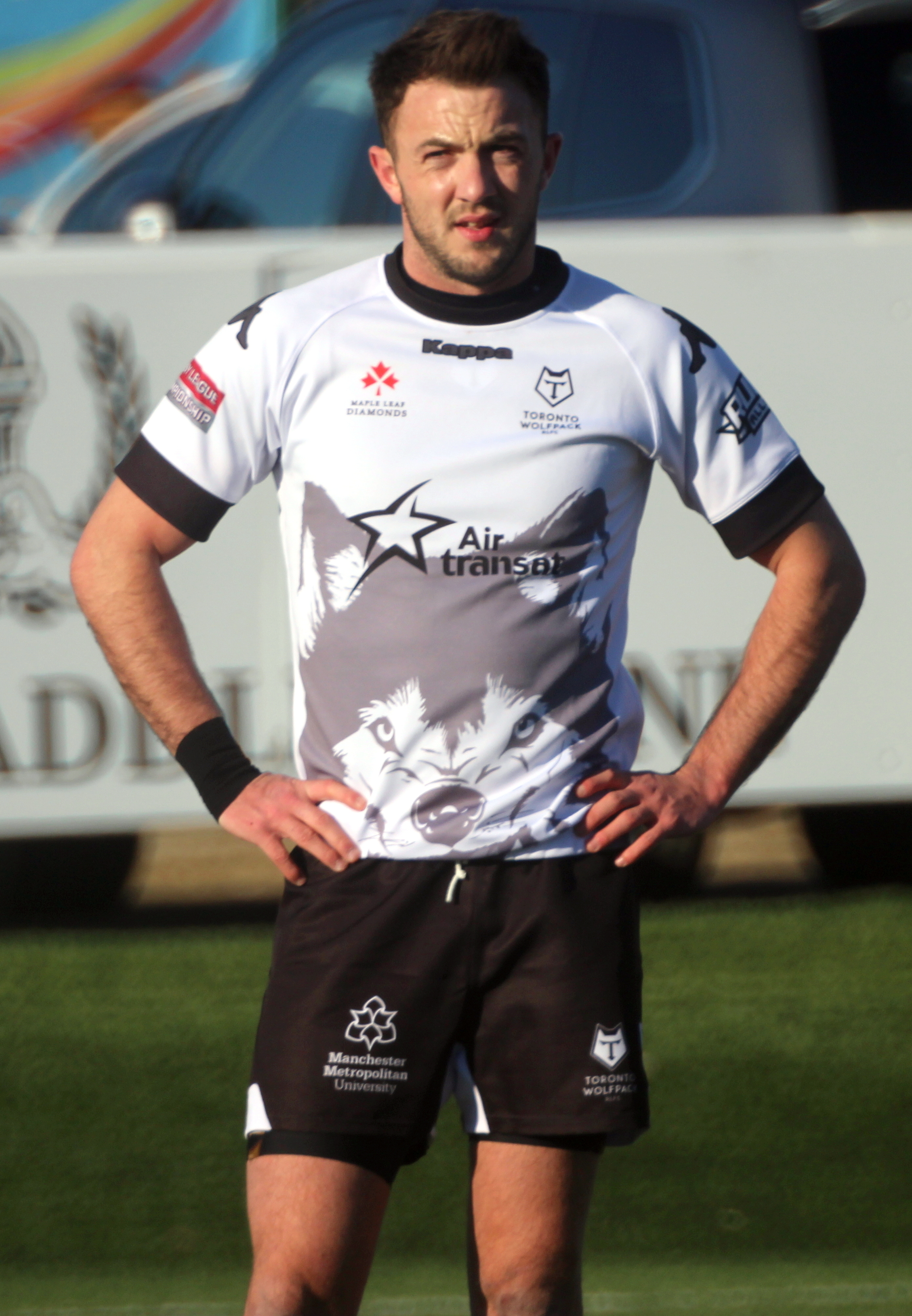
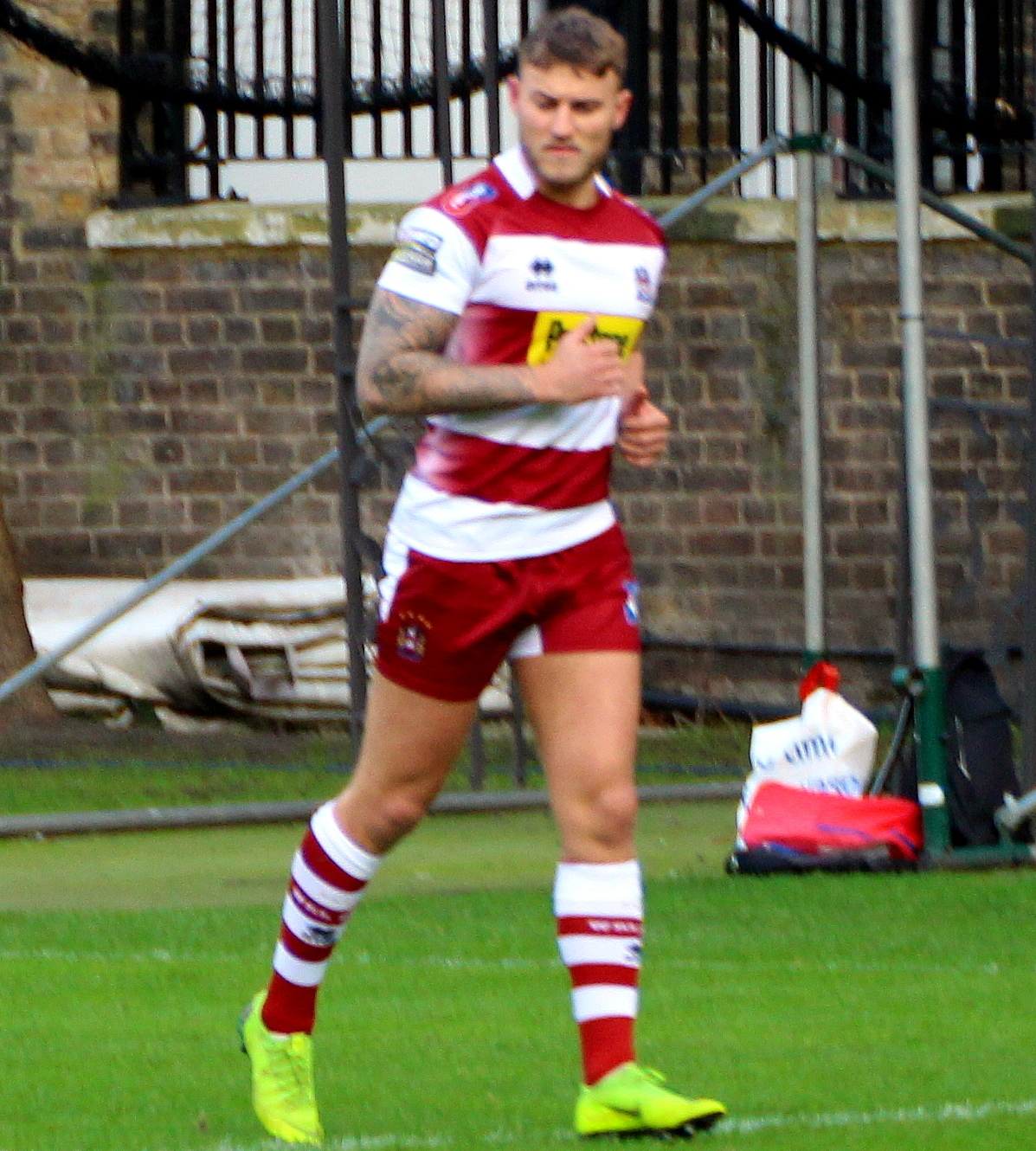
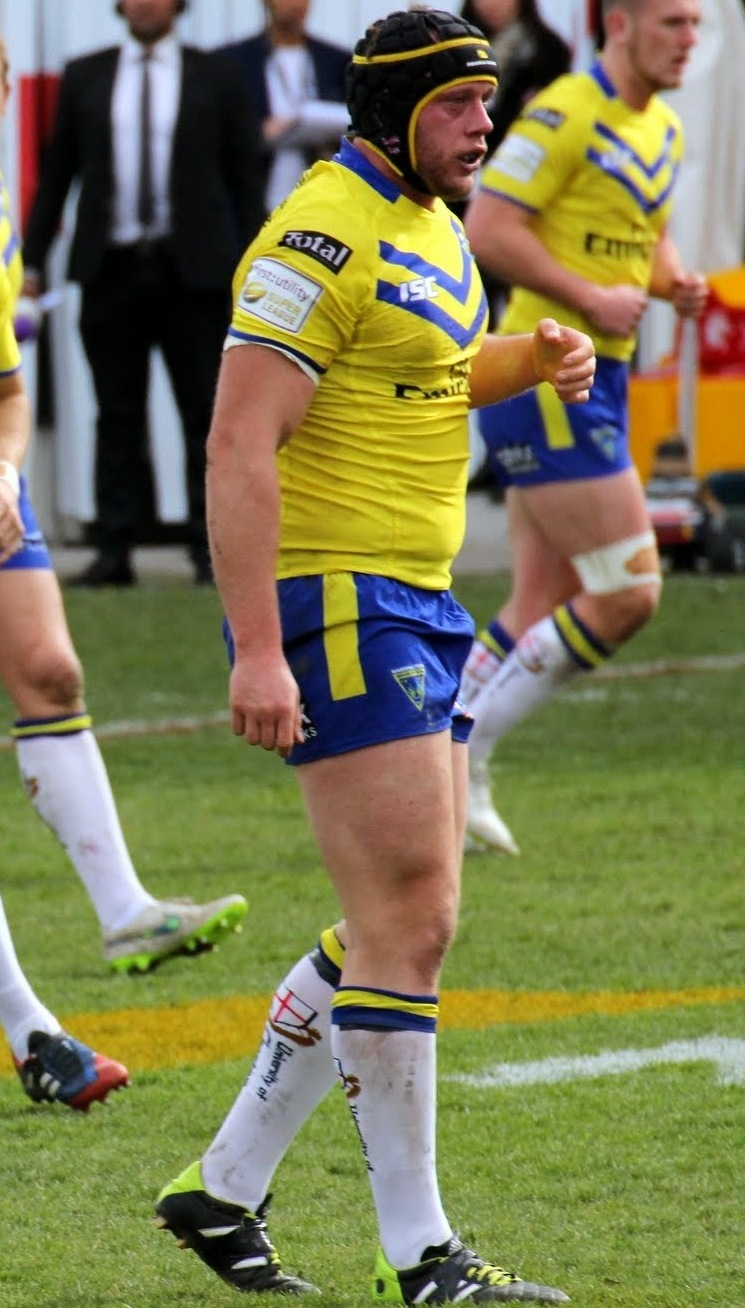
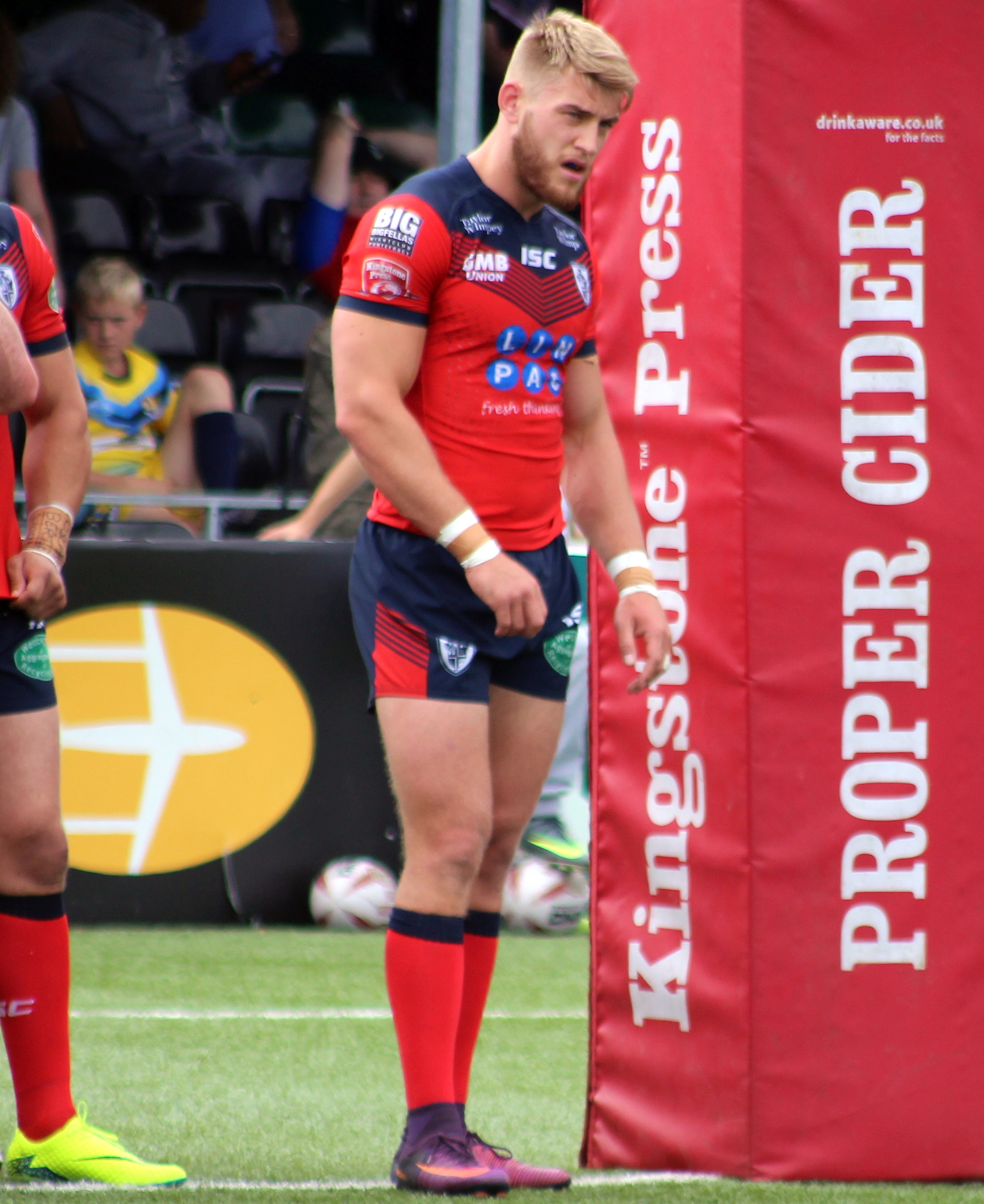
Replacement captain Ryan Brierley and top goal scorer Chris Hankinson, as well as props Chris Hill and Jack Ormondroyd, among others, all left the club in August 2025 after it was revealed their pensions were not being paid

On 14 May 2025, His Majesty's Revenue and Customs (HMRC) filed a winding-up petition against Salford City Reds (2013) Limited, the operating company for Salford Red Devils, after it was revealed the club owed HMRC £500,000 in debts. A day later, a bid by Salford to buy the Salford Community Stadium outright through Jacobson Management fell through when Salford City Council pulled out of negotiations with the company. For a third time, Salford's players were not paid on time throughout May, however players received their pay only a day late from an outside company and not the club's accounts. Sam Stone departed the club on loan to Warrington Wolves for the rest of the season on 17 June after having been accused by coach Paul Rowley of "downing tools" by making himself unavailable for squad selection in the prior Round 14 fixture against St Helens.

After having announced that a bridging loan was to arrive to help pay both HMRC debts and players and staff wages, on 25 June, the winding-up petition against Salford City Reds (2013) Limited was adjourned until 3 September. Between that period, however, following the threat of a players' strike in the Round 19 fixture against the Leeds Rhinos, the situation escalated significantly after it was confirmed in August 2025 that Salford had not been paying its players' pensions, with only two months' worth of pensions paid to players over the course of 2025; with non-playing staff also not being paid through July, this was followed with the exits of club captain Ryan Brierley, top goal scorer Chris Hankinson, Chris Hill and Jack Ormondroyd from the club days prior to Salford's Round 21 fixture against Hull F.C. on 10 August.

The squad for the Hull F.C. fixture eventually included ten players on loan, two of which came from Leeds Rhinos on a week's loan, after regulations against loans were relaxed by special dispensation of the RFL, as well as Leigh Leopards' Brad Dwyer, whose late addition after the submission of the initial squad saw Salford docked one interchange for the match. Salford ultimately lost this match 80-6, with a consolation try and conversion provided by loanees Brad Dwyer and Riley Lumb respectively, as well as fan protests early in the match, being applauded by both sets of fans at the MKM Stadium.

Following a near-lack of communication throughout the season since the takeover, Dario Berta's ownership consortium released a statement on 11 August declaring that "Salford Red Devils will not close", stating that the club was dealing with £3 million of inherited debt, that an external backer's "essential £1.8m investment" failed to materialise in November 2024, and that the bridging loan would be delivered to the club by the end of August. A supporter's group, 'The 1873', set up to demand "urgent answers" from a "silent and neglectful" ownership, labelled the statement "nothing more than a wall of excuses, finger-pointing and deliberate falsehoods" in response a day later, and has planned protest action at the Round 22 home fixture against Wakefield Trinity. During August, Charlie Glover departed from the club for semi-professional rugby union team Preston Grasshoppers R.F.C., while Tom Whitehead was recalled from his rolling monthly loan by Warrington and signed on loan to Oldham R.L.F.C. for the remainder of the club's 2025 RFL Championship campaign.

=== Match cancellation ===
Salford's chief operating officer Claire Bradbury, who had been appointed to the role in October 2024, resigned from the position and the club on 14 August; in a post on her LinkedIn profile, she accused the club's ownership of suggesting she "sleep with an individual at the RFL to 'smooth things over'". Players and staff were not paid again on time during July, and doubts were made for the fulfilment of the Round 22 Wakefield Trinity fixture as other clubs recalled their loaned players and were not willing to make further loans to Salford. Ultimately, the fixture was cancelled on 15 August following discussion with the RFL on the grounds of "significant welfare concerns", with Wakefield awarded a 48-0 forfeit victory on 20 August by the RFL. The Round 23 fixture against the Leigh Leopards went ahead on 22 August following the loans of Leon Ruan and Louix Gorman from Hull Kingston Rovers, Jack Darbyshire from Leigh Leopards and Neil Tchamambe from Wakefield Trinity to the club, resulting in a 6-38 loss to Leigh.

Despite scoring a shock 25-12 win away at Warrington Wolves in Round 24 on 29 August, on 1 September, Salford's assistant coach Kurt Haggerty, who was to be appointed as head coach to replace Paul Rowley from 2026, left the club by mutual consent. On 3 September, the winding-up petition against the club was adjourned for a second time to 29 October, falling over a month after the conclusion of Salford's Super League season.

=== Post-season ===
Salford ended their 2025 season in 12th place following a defeat to Wakefield Trinity, a match which saw numerous protests by both sets of supporters as well as two pitch invasions late in the match by Salford fans. On 22 September, Salford were hit with a points deduction and a £5,000 fine by the RFL, half of which was suspended until 2029, for breaching "a number of operational rules" for their sixteen-player team selection in the Round 1 fixture against St Helens. As a result, Salford finished the season with a total of four league points instead of six.

When applications for IMG Grading for inclusion in the 14-team 2026 Super League season were announced by the RFL on 16 September, Salford were not among the nine clubs that applied for Super League status. Salford's relegation was confirmed by the promotion of Bradford Bulls to the Super League on 16 October, bringing an end to Salford's 17-year stay in the Super League.

=== Liquidation ===
On 3 December 2025, after two more hearings were consecutively adjourned to allow opportunities for the club to pay back it's debts, Salford City Reds (2013) Limited was wound up by the High Court during a one-minute hearing over the unpaid debt to HMRC. The club's playing licence was revoked by the RFL following the ruling, meaning the club were not able to play in the 2026 RFL Championship, however a phoenix club named Salford RLFC, a consortium led by former player Mason Caton-Brown, was approved to take Salford Red Devils' place in the Championship on 22 December.

== Preseason friendlies ==
| Date and time | Versus | H/A | Venue | Result | Score | Tries | Goals | Attendance | Report |
|---|---|---|---|---|---|---|---|---|---|
| 25 January; 15:00 (Note: Morgan Knowles' testimonial match.) | St Helens | A | Totally Wicked Stadium | W | 26–12 | Brierley (2), Morgan (2), Hankinson (2), Cross | Sneyd (6/7) | 4,766 | |

== Super League ==
| Date and time | Round | Versus | H/A | Venue | Result | Score | Tries | Goals | Attendance | TV | Pos. | Report |
|---|---|---|---|---|---|---|---|---|---|---|---|---|
| 14 February; 20:00 | Round 1 | St Helens | A | Totally Wicked Stadium | L | 0–82 (Note: This match became the highest-scoring Super League match since 2000.) | | | 12,218 | BBC Two; Sky Sports + | 12th | |
| 22 February; 15:00 | Round 2 | Leeds Rhinos | H | Salford Community Stadium | L | 6–32 | Watkins | Sneyd (1/1) | 5,798 | Sky Sports + | 12th | |
| 27 February; 20:00 | Round 3 | Hull Kingston Rovers | A | Craven Park | L | 0–42 | | | 10,515 | Sky Sports + | 12th | |
| 7 March; 20:00 | Round 4 | Castleford Tigers | A | Wheldon Road | L | 14–22 | Brierley, Watkins | Sneyd (2/2 + 1 pen.) | 6,295 | Sky Sports + | 12th | |
| 20 March; 20:00 | Round 5 | Huddersfield Giants | H | Salford Community Stadium | W | 23–10 | Nikorima, Marsters, Wilson | Brierley (3/4); Drop-goals: Brierley | 3,764 | Sky Sports + | 11th | |
| 30 March; 15:00 | Round 6 | Wigan Warriors | A | Brick Community Stadium | L | 0–54 | | | 14,262 | BBC Red Button; Sky Sports + | 11th | |
| 10 April; 20:00 | Round 7 | Leeds Rhinos | H | Salford Community Stadium | L | 0–28 | | | 4,159 | Sky Sports Action | 11th | |
| 19 April, 18:00 (GMT) | Round 8 (Rivals Round) | Catalans Dragons | A | Stade Gilbert Brutus | L | 10–38 | Vaughan, Chan | Brierley (1/2) | 8,768 | Sky Sports + | 11th | |
| 26 April, 17:30 | Round 9 | Leigh Leopards | H | Salford Community Stadium | L | 6–28 | Shorrocks | Morgan (1/1) | 5,493 | Sky Sports + | 11th | |
| 3 May; 16:15 | Round 10 (Magic Weekend) | Hull Kingston Rovers | N | St James' Park | L | 0–54 | | | 31,294 (Note: Attendance recorded across three fixtures.) | Sky Sports Action | 11th | |
| 18 May; 17:30 | Round 11 | Castleford Tigers | A | Wheldon Road | L | 16–48 | Macdonald (2), Foster | Brierley (2/3) | 5,469 | Sky Sports + | 12th | |
| 25 May; 15:00 | Round 12 | Wakefield Trinity | A | Belle Vue | L | 10–72 | Vaughan, Macdonald | Brierley (1/2) | 6,277 | Sky Sports + | 12th | |
| 30 May; 20:00 | Round 13 | Wigan Warriors | H | Salford Community Stadium | L | 6–46 | Connell | Hankinson (1/1) | | Sky Sports + | 12th | |
| 15 June; 15:00 | Round 14 | St Helens | H | Salford Community Stadium | L | 4–46 | S. Hill | Hankinson (0/1) | | Sky Sports + | 12th | |
| 22 June; 15:00 | Round 15 | Hull F.C. | H | Salford Community Stadium | L | 6–38 | Hankinson | Hankinson (1/1) | | Sky Sports + | 12th | |
| 29 June; 15:00 | Round 16 | St Helens | A | Totally Wicked Stadium | L | 0–58 | | | 10,192 | Sky Sports + | 12th | |
| 4 July; 20:00 | Round 17 | Warrington Wolves | H | Salford Community Stadium | L | 12–24 | Ryan | Hankinson (0/1 + 4 pen.) | | Sky Sports + | 12th | |
| 13 July; 15:00 | Round 18 | Castleford Tigers | H | Salford Community Stadium | W | 26–22 | Hankinson, Marsters, Mellor, Ryan, Wilson | Hankinson (3/5) | 2,051 | Sky Sports + | 12th | |
| 18 July; 20:00 | Round 19 | Leeds Rhinos | A | Headingley Rugby Stadium | L | 6–42 | Brierley | Hankinson (1/1) | | Sky Sports + | 12th | |
| 31 July; 20:00 | Round 20 | Hull Kingston Rovers | H | Salford Community Stadium | L | 12–74 | Sangaré, Glover | Morgan (2/2) | | Sky Sports Action | 12th | |
| 10 August; 15:00 | Round 21 | Hull F.C. | A | MKM Stadium | L | 6–80 | Dwyer | Lumb (1/1) | 11,242 | Sky Sports + | 12th | |
| 17 August; 15:00 | Round 22 | Wakefield Trinity | H | Salford Community Stadium | N/A | C–C (Note: Match cancelled on 15 August due to "significant welfare concerns"; Wakefield later awarded a 48-0 forfeit by the RFL.) | | | | Sky Sports + | 12th | |
| 22 August; 20:00 | Round 23 | Leigh Leopards | A | Leigh Sports Village | L | 6–38 | Mellor | Milnes (1/1) | 7,826 | Sky Sports + | 12th | |
| 29 August; 20:00 | Round 24 | Warrington Wolves | A | Halliwell Jones Stadium | W | 25–12 | Sangaré (2), Darbyshire, Chan | Milnes (4/4); Drop-goals: Milnes | | Sky Sports + | 12th | |
| 4 September; 20:00 | Round 25 | Catalans Dragons | H | Salford Community Stadium | L | 16–17 | Tchamambe (2), Darbyshire | Milnes (2/3) | | Sky Sports + | 12th | |
| 14 September; 15:00 | Round 26 | Huddersfield Giants | A | Kirklees Stadium | L | 8–22 | Sangaré | Milnes (1/1 + 1 pen.) | | Sky Sports + | 12th | |
| 19 September; 20:00 | Round 27 | Wakefield Trinity | H | Salford Community Stadium | L | 16–52 | Marsters, Connell, Walker | Milnes (2/3) | | Sky Sports + | 12th | |

=== Table ===
| Pos | Team | Pld | W | D | L | PF | PA | PD | Pts | Qualification |
|---|---|---|---|---|---|---|---|---|---|---|
| 1 | Hull Kingston Rovers (L, C) | 27 | 22 | 0 | 5 | 786 | 292 | +494 | 44 | Advance to Semi-finals |
| 2 | Wigan Warriors | 27 | 21 | 0 | 6 | 794 | 333 | +461 | 42 | Advance to Semi-finals |
| 3 | Leigh Leopards | 27 | 19 | 1 | 7 | 619 | 452 | +167 | 39 | Advance to Eliminators |
| 4 | Leeds Rhinos | 27 | 18 | 0 | 9 | 610 | 310 | +300 | 36 | Advance to Eliminators |
| 5 | St Helens | 27 | 17 | 0 | 10 | 677 | 314 | +363 | 34 | Advance to Eliminators |
| 6 | Wakefield Trinity (Note: Salford forfeited their game against Wakefield. Under RFL operational rules, the game is recorded as a 48–0 victory for Wakefield, and converse loss for Salford, with the points scored and conceded applying to both teams.) | 27 | 15 | 0 | 12 | 688 | 458 | +230 | 30 | Advance to Eliminators |
| 7 | Hull FC | 27 | 13 | 1 | 13 | 539 | 461 | +78 | 27 | |
| 8 | Warrington Wolves | 27 | 10 | 0 | 17 | 480 | 641 | −161 | 20 | |
| 9 | Catalans Dragons | 27 | 10 | 0 | 17 | 425 | 652 | −227 | 20 | |
| 10 | Huddersfield Giants | 27 | 7 | 0 | 20 | 347 | 738 | −391 | 14 | |
| 11 | Castleford Tigers | 27 | 6 | 0 | 21 | 396 | 815 | −419 | 12 | |
| 12 | Salford Red Devils (R) | 27 | 3 | 0 | 24 | 234 | 1129 | −895 | 4 (Note: On 22 September 2025, Salford Red Devils were deducted two points breaching "a number of RFL operational rules" surrounding their team selection for their Round 1 fixture against St Helens on 15 February 2025.) | Relegated to Championship |

(C) Champions; (L) League Leaders' Shield Winners; (R) Relegated

== Challenge Cup ==
On 25 June 2024, the RFL announced a change to the Challenge Cup format, totalling 7 rounds compared to the previous 9, with Super League teams entering to play away from home at round 3.

Salford were first drawn to play the Midlands Hurricanes away in Round 3, following Midlands' 46-0 victory over Siddal A.R.L.F.C. on 26 January. Following their victory against Midlands, Salford were drawn on 15 February to play the Bradford Bulls at home on 14 March, and after a 26-16 victory over Bradford, Salford entered the quarter-finals and were drawn to play the Catalans Dragons at the Stade Gilbert Brutus. Salford were ultimately knocked out of the 2025 Challenge Cup by Catalans during the quarter-final fixture.

| Date and time | Round | Versus | H/A | Venue | Result | Score | Tries | Goals | Attendance | TV | Report |
|---|---|---|---|---|---|---|---|---|---|---|---|
| 9 February; 19:30 | Round 3 | Midlands Hurricanes | A | Alexander Stadium | W | 46–10 | Macdonald (2), Nikorima (2), Cross (2), Hankinson, Marsters | Hankinson (7/9) | 831 | Not televised | |
| 14 March; 20:00 | Round 4 | Bradford Bulls | H | Salford Community Stadium | W | 26–16 | Marsters, Brierley, Nikorima, Ryan | Morgan (3/4 + 2 pen.) | 3,066 | Not televised | |
| 4 April; 19:00 (GMT) | Quarter-finals | Catalans Dragons | A | Stade Gilbert Brutus | L | 12–20 | Shorrocks, Foster | Hankinson | | Not televised | |

== Transfers ==
=== Gains ===
| Player | Club | Contract | Date |
|---|---|---|---|
| (Cook Islands) Esan Marsters | Huddersfield Giants | 3 Years | May 2024 |
| (England) Sam Davis | London Broncos | 2 Years | October 2024 |
| (England) Chris Hill | Huddersfield Giants | 1 Year | October 2024 |
| (England) Joe Bullock | Warrington Wolves | 2 Years | October 2024 |
| (France) Justin Sangaré | Leeds Rhinos | 2 Years | November 2024 |
| (England) Declan Murphy | Saracens F.C. | End of season | July 2025 |
| (England) Jack Walker | Sheffield Eagles | End of season | August 2025 |
| (England) Isaac Shaw | Wakefield Trinity | End of season | August 2025 |

==== Loans in ====
| Player | Club | Loan period | Date |
|---|---|---|---|
| (France) Tiaki Chan | Wigan Warriors | Rolling monthly | January 2025 |
| (England) George Hill | Castleford Tigers | 1 month | March 2025 |
| (England) Jonny Vaughan | St Helens | End of season | March 2025 |
| (England) Toby Warren | Leeds Rhinos | End of season | April 2025 |
| (England) Harvey Makin | Wigan Warriors | 1 month | April 2025 |
| (Papua New Guinea) Daniel Russell | Warrington Wolves | End of season | June 2025 |
| (England) Tom Whitehead | Warrington Wolves | Rolling monthly (Note: Recalled by Warrington in August 2025 to play for Oldham R.L.F.C.) | June 2025 |
| (Australia) Kobe Rugless | Hunslet R.L.F.C. (Note: Rugless was initially set to transfer to Salford on a permanent deal, however Salford was accused by Hunslet of signing Rugless 'without our involvement or consent' and the deal was changed to a two-week loan.) | Two weeks | June 2025 |
| (England) Cain Robb | Castleford Tigers | Two weeks | June 2025 |
| (England) Danny Richardson | Hull Kingston Rovers | Two weeks | June 2025 |
| (England) Oliver Russell | Wakefield Trinity | Two weeks | July 2025 |
| (England) Jake Davies | St Helens | Two weeks | August 2025 |
| (England) Taylor Kerr | Wigan Warriors | Two weeks | August 2025 |
| (England) Ben Littlewood | Leeds Rhinos | One week (Note: By special dispensation of the RFL; minimum loan period is usually two weeks.) | August 2025 |
| (England) Riley Lumb | Leeds Rhinos | One week | August 2025 |
| (England) Harvey Makin | Wigan Warriors | Two weeks | August 2025 |
| (England) Ciaran Nolan | St Helens | Two weeks | August 2025 |
| (England) Brad Dwyer | Leigh Leopards | One week | August 2025 |
| (England) Leon Ruan | Hull Kingston Rovers | Two weeks | August 2025 |
| (Ireland) Louix Gorman | Hull Kingston Rovers | Two weeks | August 2025 |
| (England) Jack Darbyshire | Leigh Leopards | Two weeks | August 2025 |
| (Papua New Guinea) Emmanuel Waine | Bradford Bulls | 1 month | August 2025 |
| (England) Rowan Milnes | Castleford Tigers | End of season | August 2025 |
| (England) Jack Croft | Wakefield Trinity | One month | August 2025 |
| (England) Neil Tchamambe | Wakefield Trinity | One month (Note: Recalled by Wakefield ahead of their Round 27 fixture against Salford.) | August 2025 |

=== Losses ===
| Player | Club | Contract | Date |
|---|---|---|---|
| (England) Amir Bourouh | Hull F.C. | 3 Years | June 2024 |
| (England) Oliver Partington | Catalans Dragons | 2 years | June 2024 |
| (Wales) Gil Dudson | Oldham R.L.F.C. | 2 Years | September 2024 |
| (England) Andrew Dixon | N/A | Retirement | October 2024 |
| (Australia) Cade Cust | Hull F.C. | 2 Years | October 2024 |
| (England) Adam Sidlow | Swinton Lions | 1 Year | November 2024 |
| (Fiji) King Vuniyayawa | Featherstone Rovers | 1 Year | December 2024 |
| (England) Marc Sneyd | Warrington Wolves | 1 1/2 years | March 2025 |
| (Ireland) Brad Singleton | Castleford Tigers | End of season | March 2025 |
| (Samoa) Tim Lafai | N/A | Released | March 2025 |
| (England) Kallum Watkins | Leeds Rhinos | End of season | April 2025 |
| (England) Deon Cross | St Helens | 2 1/2 years | April 2025 |
| (England) Chris Atkin | Castleford Tigers | End of season | April 2025 |
| (England) Chris Hill | Bradford Bulls | End of season | August 2025 |
| (England) Chris Hankinson | Leeds Rhinos | End of season | August 2025 |
| (Scotland) Ryan Brierley | Oldham R.L.F.C. | 2 1/2 years | August 2025 |
| (England) Jack Ormondroyd | Oldham R.L.F.C. | 2 1/2 years | August 2025 |
| (Scotland) Ben Hellewell | N/A | Retirement | August 2025 |
| (England) Charlie Glover | Preston Grasshoppers | End of season | August 2025 |
| (England) Matty Foster | Oldham R.L.F.C. | End of season | August 2025 |
| (Ireland) Ethan Ryan | Oldham R.L.F.C. | End of season | August 2025 |

==== Loans out ====
| Player | Club | Loan period | Date |
|---|---|---|---|
| (England) Jamie Pye | Barrow Raiders | Season-long | January 2025 |
| (England) Nene MacDonald | Oldham R.L.F.C. | Three weeks | April 2025 |
| (England) Ethan Fitzgerald | Swinton Lions | Five weeks | May 2025 |
| (Malta) Sam Stone | Warrington Wolves | End of season | June 2025 |
| (England) Joe Bullock | Barrow Raiders | Two weeks (Note: Bullock had previously been on loan to Barrow in April, however he was forced to pull out due to sustaining a lower leg injury.) | June 2025 |
| (England) Joe Shorrocks | Leeds Rhinos | End of season | August 2025 |
| (Australia) Shane Wright | St Helens | End of season | August 2025 |

== Squad ==
2025 Salford Red Devils Squad
| First team squad | | | Coaching staff |
|---|---|---|---|
| (New Zealand) 6 Jayden Nikorima – SO, SH; (England) 9 Joe Mellor – HK, SH, SO; (Australia) 16 Loghan Lewis – PR, LF, SR; (Cook Islands) 17 Esan Marsters – CE, SO; (France) 19 Justin Sangaré – PR; (England) 21 Sam Davis – HK; (England) 24 Harvey Wilson – LF, PR, SR; (England) 26 Jamie Pye – PR; (England) 27 Kai Morgan – SO, SH; (England) 28 Nathan Connell – WG, FB | (Wales) 29 Charlie Glover – PR; (France) 30 Tiaki Chan – PR, SR; (Wales) 43 Finlay Yates – HK; (England) 45 Jonny Vaughan – CE, SR, WG; (England) 50 Toby Warren – SR; (England) 51 Sam Hill – WG; (Papua New Guinea) 52 Daniel Russell – SR, LF, CE; (England) 57 Declan Murphy – FB; (England) 64 Jack Darbyshire – CE; (England) 65 Neil Tchamambe – WG; (Ireland) 66 Louix Gorman – WG, FB | (England) 67 Leon Ruan – SR; (Papua New Guinea) 68 Emmanuel Waine – SR; (England) 69 Rowan Milnes – SO, SH; (England) 70 Jack Walker – FB; (England) 72 Isaac Shaw – PR | Head coach: (England) Paul Rowley; Assistant coach: (New Zealand) Krisnan Inu; Legend: (c) Captain(s); (vc) Vice-captain(s); GK = Goal kicker |
