= Patch of Land =

- Company type: Online Real Estate Crowdfunding
- Founded: 2012; 14 years ago
- Founder: Jason Fritton; Brian Fritton; Carlo Tabibi
- Headquarters: Los Angeles, California, United States
- Website: www.patchofland.com

Patch of Land was a peer-to-peer real estate crowdfunding online marketplace and hard money loan provider that connected real estate developers needing financing to lenders and real estate investors. Patch of Land focused on 6–24 months real-estate first lien mortgage loans with borrower guarantees.

== History ==
Patch of Land was established by Jason Fritton, Brian Fritton and Carlo Tabibi in 2012 in Los Angeles, California. Jason Fritton was among those who lobbied the United States Congress to include real-estate crowdfunding in the JOBS Act.

The company hired AdaPia d'Errico as Chief Marketing Officer and Amy Wan as General Legal Counsel.

In August 2015, Patch of Land announced its Indentured Trustee Investment Model, offering a bankruptcy remote investment structure and stronger consumer protections for its investors. Patch of Land opened its Indentured Trustee Model documentation to the public hoping that other firms would follow suit, as many did.

In 2015, CNBC created its Crowdfunding Index, powered by Crowdnetic, and included Patch of Land in both the real estate sub-sector as well as the overarching crowd financing sector

In 2015, Entrepreneur named Patch of Land on 100 Brilliant Companies list.

In April 2016, the company hired Paul Deitch from Oaktree Capital Management as CEO. He resigned in November 2017 and was replaced by co-founder and chairman Jason Fritton.

In 2022, Patch of Land was acquired by Churchill Real Estate and dissolved.

== See also ==
- Crowdsourcing
- Peer-to-peer lending
- Peer-to-peer banking
- Comparison of crowdfunding services
- Disruptive innovation
- Crowdfunding (Real Estate)
- Non-bank financial institution
- Prosper Marketplace
- Hard money loan
- Bridge Loans (Real Estate)
