= Trust deed investment company =

A licensed trust deed investment company (TDIC) offers investments in collateral-backed property loans in the United States. Unlike private individuals who are generally subject to usury laws limiting interest rates on loans, TDICs can legally lend to property owners at rates determined by market demand. Because TDICs usually lend to borrowers with needs banks cannot accommodate (e.g., fast turnaround, multiple-use real estate projects), market rates for trust deed investments are usually significantly higher than bank mortgage rates.

TDICs originate, underwrite, fund and service the loans for individual and/or group investors. Trust deed investors receive regular interest payments throughout the loan term and principal is repaid when the loan matures. In the event of default, TDICs generally manage workouts and, where necessary, foreclosure, on behalf of investors. Some TDICs have in-house real estate brokers who can re-sell REO in the event of foreclosure. Others may also have property management staff who can rent foreclosed properties on behalf of investors.

Licensing requirements for TDICs vary from state to state. Generally, TDIC activities are overseen by a state's governing real estate, lending or corporation authority, or some combination.

The private money loans provided by TDICs are also known as hard money loans—a reference to the hard assets that provide collateral for the loans. Hard money loans are usually short-term, bridge loans designed to meet temporary cash needs for projects that will eventually be refinanced with conventional bank loans.

== See also ==
- Bridge loan
- Hard money loan
- Non-conforming loan
- Private money investing
