= Lexi Holdings =

Property company of the United Kingdom

Lexi Holdings plc was a United Kingdom-based finance, property management, and property development company established in 2000 that went into administration in 2006. At its height it was one of the largest and fastest-growing independent short-term finance companies in the UK. It entered administration after a failure to reach terms on a new facility with its Bank Barclays and its Corporate Banking Director.

== Background ==
The company was formed by Shaid Luqman, a British-born ethnic-Pakistani student at the University of Manchester, who studied finance. He bought his first house during his studies, striking a deal with the university's accommodation agency. This enabled him to approach banks for refinancing, and by the time of his graduation in 1991 he owned a portfolio of 24 flats and houses, which he rented out to fellow students.

== History ==
In 2000 Luqman secured a loan of £2.5m from Barclays Bank to form Pearl Holdings. The company provided bridging loan-finance to high-net-worth individuals to build property portfolios, focusing mainly on projects which converted offices and hotels into flats. Providing agreed finance against a surveyor-agreed valuation of the final project, the company would lend within 24 hours. The loan would remain in place until project financing could be provided by a long-term lender.

Renamed Lexi Holdings plc in 2003, clients included MP's and footballers. In 2003 it was reported to be making profits of £21.4m on a turnover of £36m. The firm grew so well and quickly that in 2004 Luqman was named Entrepreneur of the Year by Ernst and Young.

At its peak, the company claimed to be worth £300M and own a Gulfstream IV business jet, while Luqman had a personal estimated wealth of £250m personal wealth, placing him 238th on the Sunday Times Rich List.

The company at the time of administration claimed to own 47 acres of residential development land at Ten Acres Lane Newton Heath Manchester worth an estimated GBP 50m, the site of the former Mansfield Brewery in Nottingham worth an estimated GBP 18.5m, a retail park in Leeds worth over GBP 20m a development site near Huddersfield worth in excess of GBP 15m, two hotels in the Lake District and a prominent development site in Piccadilly Gardens, Manchester.

== Administration ==
After protracted negotiations between Lexi and Barclays and the failure to reach a settlement with its bankers, administrators were appointed in 2006 over Lexi and associated company Ten Acre Limited.

At the time of the Lexi administration, its assets were in excess of GBP 180m and had liabilities of GBP 85 with an additional asset in the form of Ten Acre Limited valued then at GBP 50m provided to Barclays.

== Present ==
The company was dissolved 2022 alongside the publication of the final administrator's report. It detailed the recoveries for creditors as:

- Secured creditors: £100m owed, £10m distributed (90% loss)
- Unsecured creditors: unknown total claims, no distribution (100% loss)

Total costs billed by the administrators was £11.4m.

Shaid Luqman has since fled to Saudi Arabia where he is one of Jedda's largest property developers. He managed to fly out of the UK despite having his passports confiscated, and assets seized, with his brother.
