= Private money investing =

Private money investing is the reverse side of hard money lending, a type of financing in which a borrower receives funds based on the value of real estate owned by the borrower. Private Money Investing (“PMI”) concerns the source of the funds lent to hard money borrowers, as well as other considerations made from the investor's side of the equation.

Without these private, non-institutional investors, hard money would not exist.

== Private money investment industry ==
The industry is not well publicized and is largely centered in California, several Western states, and New York. Lenders are predominantly small, highly specialized mortgage brokers familiar with commercial real estate lending. The trend in California is towards mortgage funds or mortgage pools, which are structured and operate similar to commercial banks. Private Money Bankers or Real Estate Bankers, are groups, individuals, companies or funds, that pool private money, and then lend those pooled funds for profit.

== Private money investors ==
Investors range from private individuals, trusts, and LLCs to pension funds. Individual investors generally have substantial knowledge and experience in real estate or trust deed investing. Individual investors are tending to pool their money with other sophisticated investors through pooling via Private Money Bankers, also known as Real Estate Bankers, or Private Real Estate Bankers.

The motivation for investing includes: the simplicity of the underlying investment and a desire for: 1) An investment secured by real estate 2) Regular income derived from monthly dividend distributions; 3) Higher yields than those available from investing in money market funds or bonds; 4) An Active involvement in real estate finance.

== The lending process ==
A borrower seeking funds approaches a mortgage broker or private money lender and describes his borrowing needs. These include: 1) The amount of money sought; 2) The value of the property that is being pledged as security, or collateral; 3) A description of the property; 4) The use of funds.

The mortgage broker or lender then assesses the proposed loan, focusing on the value of the property being proposed as collateral. The maximum amount that may be borrowed is determined by establishing the amount of “protective equity” existing in the property.

For the private mortgage investor, this equity provides the cushion for the risk taken in extending a loan. In the event that the borrower defaults on the loan, investors recoup their capital by assuming the borrower's equity in the property.

Protective equity is calculated by taking the liquidated value of the property (the price at which the property could be sold quickly, usually ninety days), and then subtracting any outstanding debt related to the property in the form of existing loans or tax liens on the property.

This amount is then compared to a Loan to Value (“LTV”) ratio. The ratio, established by the lender, represents the maximum amount that the lender will lend a borrower. It is expressed as a percentage of the total amount of protective equity, divided by a percentage.

This percentage varies primarily with the type of property that will form the basis of the collateral. Non-income producing or difficult-to-liquidate property carries the lowest ratio. So, raw, undeveloped land may carry a maximum LTV of 50%...if a lender will even consider using it as collateral. Rural income producing property, such as a small shopping center, may similarly carry a low LTV.

Example: Appraised land value = $1,200,000 Existing trust deed = $200,000 Equity = $1,200,000 - $200,000 = $1,000,000

LTV = 60% Maximum total Loan Amount available to borrower = 60% of $1,200,000, or $800,000. The lender may choose to place a $600,000 2nd Deed of Trust behind the $200,000 existing Deed of Trust or it may place a new single $800,000 First Trust Deed loan.

If the broker determines that the liquidated value of the property falls within acceptable limits, the broker prepares a loan package summarizing the underlying details. If a broker is not involved, the lender performs these functions in-house.

The borrower is advised as to an approximate amount of funds that may be borrowed, and is provided with a preliminary estimate of a range of interest rates and loan fees that may be anticipated. This advisement often comes in the form of a Letter of Intent or Letter of Interest prepared by the lender.

If the borrower agrees to these figures, the broker proceeds by doing one of two things: 1) He contacts individual Private Money Investors and solicits their direct investment in the loan. This is called FRACTIONAL INVESTMENT [described below]; 2) Alternatively, he brokers the loan by contacting Private Money Lenders known to be interested in making loans of the size, type and location sought by the borrower. These lenders in turn create fractional investments themselves or are MORTGAGE FUNDS [described below].

== Underwriting ==
Following receipt and agreement of the Letter of Intent, the lender performs a rapid review of the property and underlying financing, title and credit issues. This due diligence process includes the preparation of a property appraisal by an independent professional appraiser and, frequently, personal meetings with the borrower and personal inspections of the property by the lenders.

== Funding ==
Following the completion of the preparation and compilation of necessary documentation, the loan proceeds are transferred to the borrower. After a brief pause in financing activities, the borrower then turns his attention to arranging permanent financing to replace the higher cost bridge loan he is committed to.

== Methods of investment ==
Private Mortgage Investment takes three primary forms: Direct Mortgage Investment, Fractional Investment and Mortgage Fund Investment.

=== Direct Mortgage Investment ===
This is the traditional method for investors to extend loans to borrowers for hundreds of years. A single investor (lender) agrees to loan money and secures the obligation by way of a registered mortgage on title of the property. Monthly payments are made directly to the lender. Broker's or "middlemen" might be involved to make introductions however after the mortgage is funded and the broker is paid a fee, the lender works directly with the borrower.

=== Fractional Investment ===
This is a "pooled or syndicated" method for multiple investors to extend loans to borrowers. A limited number of investors (in California, 10) secure a loan made to a borrower by placing their names on a First (or Second or Third) Deed of Trust on the borrower's property. Monthly payments are made to a servicing agent, who then distributes the payments pro rata to the individual investors.

Fractionals provide the benefits of simplicity and transparency. Each individual investor reviews each prospective loan prior to making a decision to invest. On the downside, “building” each loan investor-by-investor takes time, detracting from one of Private Money's key advantages: speed.

By its nature, the investment is not diversified for individual investors. The investment is made entirely to a single borrower, usually on a single property. In the event the borrower fails to make monthly interest payments, the income flow to the investors stops. If the borrower defaults on the loan, this income flow will cease completely. Investment principal and interest will be recaptured only after the loan is renegotiated, or the property securing the loan is foreclosed upon and sold.

Further, investors holding larger percentage interests in a fractionalized loan may maintain greater control within the transaction the other, smaller investors. In the event that additional investment funds are required in order to prepare a foreclosed-upon property for sale, investors must come up with these additional funds.

=== Mortgage Fund Investment ===
Mortgage Funds (also, “Mortgage Pools”) resemble equity mutual funds, funds composed of a wide selection of stocks. Investors deposit money in a fund: The fund is managed by mortgage brokers or mortgage bankers certified by the State. Money within the fund is lent to borrowers and is secured by First (or Second or Third) Deeds of Trust naming the FUND as the holder, rather than individual investors.

By purchasing shares in a mortgage fund, and as interest is earned from monthly mortgage payments, the fund generates income.

There are approximately 100 mortgage funds in California. All are closed-end, meaning the number of investors and amount of investment dollars are capped. Many are closed: They are not accepting new investors.

Investor yields are similar to those obtained through fractional investment. The primary difference lies in diversification. Risk is spread across a portfolio of loans, not centered on a single loan as with fractionals. Risk is spread across the entire pool of borrowers, and different types of properties, in different locations.

As a result, in the event of a late pay or default, there could be minimal – or no – impact on investors’ yield. Reserve accounts established by the fund and by its manager would compensate for any shortfall.

Another difference in funds is liquidity. If an investor in a fractional wishes to cash in his position, he must either be replaced with another investor, or he must wait for the loan to be paid off by the borrower. Because many private money loans take the form of short term bridge loans lasting less than a year, this waiting period is generally limited.

Mortgage funds, however, generally offer rapid –sometimes, immediate—repayment of principal. This is possible because a) Funds have reserve accounts in place for this purpose; b) Funds are generally oversubscribed, with more investors wanting into the fund than those wanting out.

The third difference is control. The situation is analogous in the equity world to investors selecting individual stocks in which to invest, vs. investing in a mutual fund. Whereas fractional investors make the investment decision on each property themselves, fund investors delegate this duty to the fund managers.

Other features: Fund participants enjoy 365-day investments – they aren't sidelined between loan opportunities Less paperwork

== Subcategories of mortgage fund investments ==
=== Mortgage notes ===
Under this structure, investors purchase notes from the Manager for a specified period of time with a fixed rate of return. The notes are backed by a security interest in the portfolio of loans within the fund. The primary difference is that the Manager guarantees the funds itself, providing a second layer of security to investors. Returns to investors, however, are lower.

=== Equity ownership programs ===
Here, investors take direct ownership positions within properties that are undergoing rehabilitation or new development, participating as Members within LLCs created specifically for each project. This structure can be used in conjunction with loans extended to the project, so that the investor holds both equity and debt interests.

== Investor eligibility ==
Minimum net worth requirements must be met by investors (in California) to be eligible to invest in Mortgage Funds operating subject to a Permit. These restrictions are intended to limit Mortgage Fund investment to more experienced investors. Additional restrictions limit the maximum percentage of an individual's self-directed IRA that can be invested.

Eligibility: Net worth requirements (California) Either: • Annual gross income of $65,000 plus net worth of $250,000 (exclusive of home, furnishings and automobiles) or • Net worth of $500,000 (exclusive of home, furnishings and automobiles).

Mortgage funds operating pursuant to a Plan (described below) limit investor eligibility to California residents or to International residents. Residents of other states may not participate.

== Regulatory oversight ==
Fractional investments [in California] fall under the jurisdiction of the Department of Real Estate. Regulations require, among other things, that a broker be licensed as a real estate broker by the department.

Mortgage Funds are regulated [in California] by the Department of Corporations. They are established only after the department reviews a Plan submitted by the managers of the proposed fund, which sets out, in detail, the specifics of the fund's operations, such as LTVs. Funds are limited as to the maximum number of investors they may take into themselves, the minimum initial amount an investor may invest, and the maximum total dollar amount that will be accepted into the fund.

Funds are required to submit annual audited financial statements to the department and to investors. Funds are also subject to operation and investor regulation from the Department of Real Estate and the Department of Industrial Relations.

== Investment management ==
Fractional investments are generally originated and managed by mortgage brokers specializing in the field. [In California] these brokers operate under the auspices of the Department of Real Estate and are subject to its regulations.

Mortgage funds operate under the auspices and regulations of the Department of Corporations subject to Plans that are reviewed and renewed annually by the department. Funds often are formed as LLCs, and may be referred to as Private Money Banks, or managed by Private Money Bankers.

Funds are managed by separate entities which are also subject to Department of Corporations regulations. These entities may be referred to as Private Money Banks, or managed by Private Money Bankers, and provide operational functions for the funds: They originate, underwrite and service the loans enabled by the fund's investors.

== Investment considerations ==
Fractional vs. Mortgage Fund • Need for liquidity vs. need for details on individual loans prior to making investment decision • Desire for diversification vs. need for details on individual loans prior to making investment decision

Which Fund? • Fund location and lending area • Property type fund specializes in • Fund operations: responsiveness to initial queries, follow-up • Personal impression of fund managers and support staff

Other, Personal • Amount of investmentGDVZV • Monthly cash distribution or reinvest all or some of dividends?

== Mortgage funds compared to REITs ==
REITs (Real Estate Investment Trusts) are companies that own and manage commercial properties. Most REITs sell securities that are publicly traded. Investors buy stock in them, seeking to benefit by the stock dividends REITs pay, as well as the appreciation of the price of the stock itself.

=== Similarities ===
Investors place money into funds that invest in real estate. The portfolios are professionally managed for the benefit of the members or stockholders

=== Differences ===
Sources of income: REITS use funds to purchase, manage, improve and sell properties. Investor returns come from operations and from the sale of properties.

Mortgage funds use investors’ funds to extend short term gap financing, loans made to commercial borrowers secured by real estate. Pools lend against the value of the property – they don't own or manage the property itself, except in rare foreclosure instances.

=== Property types ===
REITs typically own and manage office buildings and shopping centers, although there are REITS specializing in warehouse and other commercial space.

Mortgage Funds individually specialize in loans to particular property types, usually located close to their own offices. Across the industry, they extend loans secured by in virtually every type of real estate, from raw land and factories to gas stations and restaurants.

=== Yields ===
REITS showed overall total returns as high as 38.5% in 2005, declining to 8.29% by the end of the year. As of June 1, 2006, REIT returns were 7.42%.

Mortgage Funds: Yields virtually always fall within a narrow band 4% to 6% above money market returns. Mortgage fund returns are linked directly to high loan interest payments – not stock prices. The math is simple: Investors receive about 2% less than the high interest amount being paid by borrowers. In Q3 2006 yields for most funds range from 9% to 11%.

=== Management fees ===
REITS: Fees vary and can be as much as 35% of revenue.

Mortgage Funds: Most funds reserve the right to collect management fees of 1%, with another 1% for servicing fees. In practice, few deduct these fees.

Management obtains its income from origination and servicing fees paid by borrowers. Mortgage fund investors are not exposed to any operational expenses of the underlying mortgage business. The fund in effect serves as the “bank” for the manager. It's a source of funds – period. Investors receive higher yields because they are not subjected to any operational expenses – the cost of actually running a mortgage company.

=== Payouts ===
REITS: The IRS requires that REITs pay out 90% of their earnings each year. Result: they can't preserve much of their income.

Mortgage Funds: Face no such restrictions.

== The future of private money investment ==
Although the traditional fractional investment model will continue, the trend to mortgage funds is accelerating. Reasons:

1. Increasing property values continue to push prices – and loan amounts – higher. More investors are necessary for each transaction, a costly and time-consuming process to conduct for each loan. This time lag translates into slower funding for borrowers – and more time on the sidelines for investors.

2. The regulatory preference [in California] will likely continue. The structure, accountability and standards required for mortgage funds provides a better fit for government oversight.

3. The combination of diversification, liquidity and professional management enabled by mortgage funds will increasingly give them more of the appearance of banks, further adding to investor appeal.

== See also ==
- Hard money loan
- Asset-based loan A similar type of commercial loan based on real estate, indicating the loan will be based upon a percentage of the properties appraised value, as the key criteria.
- Bridge loan - A similar type of commercial loan based on real estate.
- Non-conforming loans - loans for non-conforming projects.
- Commercial loan - Standard, broad types of loans based on commercial property value.
