= Mastro =

Mastro may refer to:

- Mastro, Greece, a village in Aetolia-Acarnania, Greece
- Dean Del Mastro, Canadian politician
- Maddie Mastro, American snowboarder
- Michael Mastro, American property developer
- Michael Mastro, American Broadway and film actor
