= Commercial lender (U.S.) =

Loan-offering service

In the United States a commercial lender offers loans backed by hard collateral. In most cases this is real estate, but it can also include factoring, non-conforming assets, or other sources of collateral.

== Commercial lending practices ==
Commercial lenders include commercial banks, mutual companies, private lending institutions, hard money lenders and other financial groups. These lenders typically have widely varying standards on which they base their loan criteria and evaluate potential borrowers—but are often focused exclusively on the private market and have more lenient financial qualifications than banks.

Commercial lenders specialize in hard money and bridge loans, often those that close quickly, in as little as two weeks. The commercial loan industry is most often accessed through commercial brokers, who provide an evaluation of a borrower and then recommend the loan to a number of different commercial lenders whom they feel will be most likely to fund the borrower's request. Going through a broker rather than directly through a lender may cause longer wait times for loan financing and more up-front fees. However, they can greatly facilitate the process and come up with innovative and unique ways to overcome obstacles that the borrower may not be able to access on their own.

== Costs of commercial lenders ==
Commercial lenders weigh the type, quality, and equity of the hard collateral very heavily. They provide the borrower with the greatest flexibility but also the highest rates when compared with bank loans. Many commercial loans are bridge loans where a higher rate is a good trade off for the speed with which the loan is delivered and the flexibility of the finance terms behind it.

== Commercial lending industry ==
Thanks to freedom from regulation, the commercial lending industry operates with particular speed and responsiveness, making it an attractive option for those seeking quick funding. However, this has also created a highly predatory lending environment where many companies refer loans to one another (brokering), increasing the price and loan points with each referral.

There is also great concern about the practices of some lending companies in the industry who require upfront payments to investigate loans and refuse to lend on virtually all properties while keeping this fee. Borrowers are advised not to work with hard money lenders who require exorbitant upfront fees prior to funding in order to reduce this risk.

=== Commercial lenders and loan terms ===
In recent years there have been some significant advances. A good example is that credit unions are now allowed to engage in commercial lending with only minor restrictions. Most notable among those restrictions is that credit unions are prohibited in most cases from lending more than 80% of the value of real property. This is done to protect credit union members from excessive risk and is a common practice in the industry as a whole, although not enforced. On the other hand, credit unions are cooperatives and can therefore offer competitive advantages over other institutions in regards to rate and other terms.

Most commercial lenders prefer to offer terms for shorter periods of time than residential lenders might at thirty or so years. Commercial lenders sometimes offer a five or ten-year loan with a payout based on longer, thereby leaving a balloon payment due at the loan expiration. That often requires the property owner to come up with the balloon payment himself, or to refinance or sell.

Additionally a commercial lender might attempt to charge a "pre-payment penalty" in order to guarantee a certain return, in the event the loan is not kept for the full term. Frequently pre-payment penalties range between one and five years and are for an amount of interest or number of months such as frequently will be seen a "six month interest guarantee" etc.

=== Commercial bridge loan ===
Commercial bridge loans are sometimes referred to as short term financing, bridge financing or even hard money. Bridge loans are easy to qualify for as long as there is equity remaining in the property sufficient to cover the commercial lender's risk capital.

Commercial bridge lenders will overlook property issues, incomplete permits, credit and other problems in exchange for a higher rate of return. However they will look to offset that risk by lending at a lower loan to value ratio usually of under 65% of the property's value.

== See also ==
- Hard money lender
- Mortgage loan
- Commercial bank
