= Trustee Sales Guarantee =

In the United States, the Trustee Sale Guarantee (TSG) is the title guarantee that is issued at the beginning of a foreclosure. TSG helps the foreclosing trustee and beneficiary through the delivery of the information required in ensuring compliance with the statutes of foreclosure stipulated by the state.

Issuing the trustee sale guarantee is the start of a foreclosure process. It helps the lender and/or their private investment by providing information needed to ensure they follow federal law. The lender/private investor (the trustees) use a title company to issue the TSG, which give notice of the pending foreclosure. A Notice of Trustee's Sale notify homeowners and mortgage borrowers that their property will be sold at a trustee's sale on a specific date and at a specific location. The actual sale typically completes a non-judicial foreclosure. The highest bidder at a trustee's sale gets title to the property; if no one bids, the title to the property keeps with the foreclosing mortgage lender.

A valid foreclosure requires the following documents to be successful:

- Record vesting current owner
- Encumbrances, liens, and judgments bankruptcy information
- Foreclosing mortgage priority
- Verification of property address
- Information on property tax
- Newspaper publication entities
- Parties needed to be notified of the foreclosure by law

The process of foreclosure starts when the trustor (borrower) defaults in the loan obligation performance to the lender. Each state prescribes particular or specific laws when it comes to the process of foreclosure and the notices required. The TSG is an assurance to both the lender and the foreclosure attorney against the losses that are incurred up to the balance of the loan as a result of the errors in the Trustee Sale Guarantee.

== How long it takes and when it is ordered ==
The Trustee Sale Guarantee is issued and ordered at the beginning of the foreclosure process. The Lawyers Title offers or provides this report typically within two to three business days.

== Information included in the TSG ==
- Deed of trust(s) or mortgage recorded
- Vesting of title and legal description to the property
- Judicial district or city where the land is located
- The foreclosure proceedings newspaper qualified publications
- Addresses/names of the entities/people who must be provided with the foreclosure proceedings notice
- Bankruptcies and property taxes
- Liens and encumbrances on the property

== Other documents and information for foreclosure lender or agent ==
- Lien resolution and title issue
- Centralized TSG processing for the state
- Electronic report delivery and access
- Recordings of documents during the process
- Property documents and research for the bankruptcy preparation relief motion
- The multiple updates to the title.

== Trustee Sale Guarantee fee ==
The TSG fee corresponds or is based on the liability amount as well as the rates of schedule that is filed by the State Department of Insurance.

== Procedures of Trustee Sale Guarantee ==
Provision of power-of-sale

The carryback seller or lender holding the note secured by the trust deed that is in default has two specific methods of foreclosure to enforce the secured debt collection

- The judicial foreclosure sale (sheriff sale)
- Non-judicial foreclosure sale (trustee sale)

Furthermore, the other security devices that may be used in creating a real estate lien to secure the debt that contains the provision of the power of sale are:

- The contract of the land sale
- The lease option sale
- The UCC-1 statement of financing
- The conditions, covenants, and restrictions of an association for assessments collection

Foreclosing under the provision of the power of sale allows the lien holder on the real estate to avoid the costly court actions for the judicial foreclosure should the owner default in a trust deed

== Who conducts the sale ==
The Trustee Deed works like the safety equipment that holding the title to the property for the lienholder benefit until the debts have been fully secured by the deed. Therefore, the parties to a trust deed are; a trustor, trustee and beneficiary.

The trustee sale is done by the trustee who is named in the trust deed or the appointed one by the trust deed beneficiary at the time the process of foreclosure is initiated by the beneficiary. An attorney, broker, trust deed services, lender subsidiary or the lender may be appointed to act as the trustee (USA Today 2019). Trustees have the power of processing the foreclosure starting with the notice of default (NOD) recording and completing with the trustee's deed delivery and the sales proceeds delivery.

== Trustee Sale Guarantee Guideline ==
The trustee in accordance to the Deed of Trust refers to an individual that is conducting the non-judicial foreclosure actions on a private capacity as well as not the state agent. Nonetheless, various state statutes exist that regulate the proceedings of the sale (First American Financial Corporation 2019). Particularly, the statutes provide for the notices to be provided to the parties that are affected by the process or conclusions of the foreclosure to the appropriate parties.

The Trustee Sale Guarantee provides the Trustee with the addresses and names of these parties. Additionally, the state law of California requires notices of the sale to be published in a general circulation published and printed newspaper in the judicial district or state as well as may designate a specifically qualified newspaper where the land that is to be sold is located.

The Guarantee provides a description of the relevant judicial district and city as well as may designate a particularly qualified newspaper (Stewart Title Guaranty Company 2009). The foreclosing beneficiary may want or wish to use the information of the title that is found in the Guarantee to assist in the making of financial decisions that are related to the foreclosure. Because the TSG is designed for the benefits of a foreclosing Trustee, such a trustee is always named as the assured. However, the foreclosing beneficiary may also be named as the Assured.
