= Michael Mastro =

American real estate developer

Michael R. Mastro (born June 1, 1925) is an American real estate developer, who was in business for forty years managing apartments and mid-size office parks in Seattle. He declared bankruptcy in 2009. Mastro and his wife, Linda, a former Bellevue grade school teacher, fled to France in 2011 after a warrant was issued for their arrest due to their failure to comply with a judge’s order that they turn over two diamond rings valued at $1.4 million to their creditors. They were arrested in 2012 in Lake Annecy, in the French Alps, and faced extradition hearings, after which it was revealed that the prior August, the U.S. Attorney’s Office had filed an initially sealed criminal complaint charging them with bankruptcy fraud. The day after being arrested in France, the Mastros were indicted by an American federal grand jury on forty-three counts of bankruptcy fraud and money laundering. After several months of house arrest, they were freed in June 2013 after a French court denied a request for their extradition back to the United States, finding that while they stole the life savings of elderly people, they themselves were too elderly to (potentially) be incarcerated.

Mastro's bankruptcy has been described as the largest personal bankruptcy in the history of State of Washington. Prior to the bankruptcy, the Mastros moved many of their assets, including a $15 million home in Medina, Washington, into an irrevocable trust based in Belize.

== Biography ==
Michael Mastro started his career in the real estate business in 1967, developing real estate projects worth at least $2 billion over 40 years, including commercial buildings and houses. He was involved in hard money loans, mostly to desperate real estate developers, with second or third deeds of trust on projects as collateral. His company, Michael R. Mastro Properties, was well known in and around Seattle, the location of most of its projects and properties. The company's developments include Vancouver's Town Plaza, originally called the Tower Mall, the Oasis water park (sold in 2001) in Palm Springs, Allison Park Apartments in Des Moines, and Ballard Lofts in Seattle.

In 1974, Mastro met divorcee Linda Ann Gale (b. 1949) in the Peoples Bank branch where they both worked, she as a loan officer, he as branch manager. They were married on June 3, 1989.

In 1989, Mastro sold office buildings, which he had developed with a partner, to Boeing for $211 million. In the early 2000s, Mastro started buying raw land for the development of residential housing.

== Bankruptcy ==
Mastro was forced into involuntary bankruptcy in July 2009 and filed for Chapter 7. On September 9, 2009, he listed assets in excess of $249 million and liabilities of over $586 million in a filing with the U.S. Bankruptcy Court for the Western District of Washington.

In May 2010, a ruling was handed down by bankruptcy judge Samuel Steiner that two diamond rings valued at $1.4 million were not available to creditors since they belonged to Linda Mastro.

In February 2011, Mastro suffered a head injury while residing in Palm Desert. He was hospitalized for two weeks and underwent brain surgery.

In June 2011, a judge ordered Michael and Linda Mastro to hand over the two diamond rings.

In May 2013, it was reported that the bankruptcy trustee, James Rigby, had filed an 82-page report that valued all of the jewelry seized from the Mastros at $3 million.

Mastro's bankruptcy is believed to be the largest personal bankruptcy ever in the state of Washington.

== Bankruptcy fraud and money laundering ==
The couple did not comply with the judge's order to hand over the diamond rings and disappeared in June 2011. In August 2011, a sealed criminal complaint was filed against Michael and Linda Mastro, charging them with bankruptcy fraud. After warrants for contempt of court (a civil violation) were issued for their arrest, they were apprehended and taken into custody in France on October 24, 2012.

On October 25, 2012, one day after being arrested in France, the Mastros were indicted by a federal grand jury on forty-three counts of bankruptcy fraud and money laundering. They were accused of hiding assets from creditors. The couple remained in custody in Chambéry after a hearing held on November 7, 2012. A panel of three French judges rejected the couple's plea, based on their age and poor health, for a conditional release. The court felt that the charges against them for bankruptcy fraud and money laundering were serious enough to keep them in jail until such time as the US filed for extradition. Prior to their arrest, the Mastros were pursued by both the FBI and U.S. marshals for sixteen months.

On November 15, 2012, the Seattle Times reported that the two diamond rings were in French authorities' possession. According to Thomas Terrier, the Mastros' French lawyer, the rings were in a safe deposit box in Annecy.

On December 12, 2012, the Seattle Times reported that Michael and Linda Mastro had been released from jail after being incarcerated for seven weeks. A three-judge panel had ruled that their health was suffering. They were to wear electronic monitoring devices and were free to walk around Annecy.

By December 12, 2012, the United States had not filed for extradition, which according to James Rigby, the United States court-appointed bankruptcy trustee, had to be filed by December 26, 2012.

== Attempted extradition from France to the United States ==
On February 23, 2013, the Seattle Times reported that the Court of Appeals in Chambery, France, had ruled that the Mastros could not be extradited to the United States unless American authorities guaranteed that the couple would not face any sanctions other than electronic surveillance. The extradition treaty between France and the United States allows France to deny extradition when the extradited party faces serious consequences related to health or age. Michael Mastro and his wife had been wearing surveillance devices but were freed after spending seven weeks in a French jail.

On June 5, 2013, the Court of Appeals of Chambéry denied the extradition of Michael and Linda Mastro from France to the United States, basing this decision on Michael Mastro's age (88), poor health, and daily dependence on his wife. The appeal had been filed by the U.S. Department of Justice. The United States' request that the case be sent to the French Supreme Court was turned down by French prosecutors, who found no grounds for appeal. As a result, the couple are no longer prevented from leaving their home in the evenings.

== Movement of Mastros after financial problems surfaced ==
Before their bankruptcy, the Mastros lived in a large waterfront house in Medina, a city in the Seattle metropolitan area. They moved to California in 2010. In 2011, they started a journey that began at Mr. Mastro's sister's house in Seattle, continued to Toronto, Ontario, Canada, and, according to investigators at Focus Ltd., ended in a €5,000 per month house in Veyrier-du-Lac, France, on the eastern shore of Lake Annecy. They then moved to Saint-Marceau, France, where the Mastros were arrested in 2012.

== Related bankruptcy of Tom Hazelrigg III ==
Tom Hazelrigg is a long-time business associate of Michael Mastro who was forced into bankruptcy by James Rigby and two other creditors in February 2012. On December 14, 2012, Judge Timothy Dore denied Hazelrigg a discharge of his debt. Hazelrigg owed Mastro $76 million. In March 2015, he was sentenced to four and a half years in prison for tax evasion.

== Controversy surrounding sale of Mastro's Medina home ==
In November 2012, Judge Marc Barreca denied Jack Dorssers, a former business associate of Mastro, a share in the $8.36 million proceeds from the sale of Mastro's Medina, Washington, home. The judge ruled that Dorssers' contention that Mastro had put up the house as collateral in 2009 for a $1.2 million loan was a sham designed to keep the house out of reach of other creditors. Dorsser is appealing Barreca's decision.

== Appeal ==
On September 9, 2014, Rami Grunbaum of the Seattle Times wrote that a federal appeals court in San Francisco had ruled that Linda Mastro was entitled to appeal the bankruptcy court's ruling about her assets.

== See also ==
- Ira Einhorn#Extradition
- List of United States extradition treaties
