= Commercial mortgage broker =

A commercial mortgage broker acts as an intermediary who brokers mortgage loans on behalf of businesses or individuals who needs a commercial loan. The loan is provided by the commercial lender securing a commercial property of the borrower. In developed mortgage markets like the United States, Canada, the United Kingdom, Australia, and United Arab Emirates, mortgage brokers are the largest sellers of mortgage products for lenders.

Some commercial mortgage brokers offer loans but most of them do not provide commercial mortgage loans. A commercial mortgage broker is often used to connect the borrower with potential lenders, obtain multiple quotes, and to manage the financing process.

== Fees ==
Some brokers charge a fee to the lenders, and others take commission, which they receive from the lenders whom they introduce to borrowers.

== By country ==
=== In Canada ===
In Ontario, commercial mortgage brokers are not required to carry a license. This helps reduce the red tape for commercial borrowers to work with commercial mortgage brokers. The commercial borrowers do not require a layer of regulatory protection because they perceived to be large enough to protect themselves.

=== In the UK ===
In the United Kingdom, commercial mortgage brokers are regulated by the National Association of Commercial Finance Brokers (NACFB).

=== In the US ===
In the United States, commercial brokers are represented by a certificate of National Association of Mortgage Brokers (NAMB): Certified Mortgage Consultant (CMC).

=== In the Australia ===
In Australia, mortgage brokers must be licensed by the Australian Securities and Investments Commission (ASIC). To obtain a licence, brokers are required to complete and lodge application form CL01 with ASIC. Additionally, they must fulfil the fitness and propriety requirements under the National Consumer Credit Protection Act 2009.^{[1]}

== See also ==
- Commercial lender (U.S.)
