= FinMkt =

American financial technology company

- Type: Private
- Industry: Financial Technology
- Founded: 2014; 12 years ago
- Headquarters: New York City, New York, United States,
- Key people: Luan Cox (Co-founder, CEO); Srikanth Goteti (Co-founder, CTO); Nathan Barber (CFO) Dheeraj Medikonda (COO)
- Products: finfi.co; www.lendvious.com
- Website: www.finmkt.io

FinMkt, Inc. is a New York City-based financial technology company originally founded in 2014 as Crowdnetic and rebranding in 2016 to its current iteration, FinMkt. FinMkt then pivoted the technology to build a premier SaaS, multi-lender, omnichannel, customizable point of sale financing platform that launched in the summer of 2020.

== Funding ==
In November 2017, FinMkt announced it closed a $5.4M equity round led by venture capital firm ManchesterStory Group with help from Seraph Group, West Loop Ventures, Sun Hung Kai Financial, Perot Jain, Vectr Ventures, and existing investors bringing the total raised funding to $7.3M. The funding round was to grow their "Marketplace Lending Gateway" also known as Lendvious, which has processed billions in consumer loan applications as well as develop their proprietary embedded point of sale lending technology platform In August 2019, the company announced that it closed its $5M Series B preferred equity round led by FINTOP Capital with participation from existing investors. In December 2021, FinMkt expanded its Series B round for an additional $2M from existing investors bringing its total capital raised to date to $14.5M.

== Partnerships ==
Throughout its early years working in the equity crowdfunding industry, FinMkt had notable media partnerships with companies like CNBC, and Thomson Reuters. Other partnerships include a collaboration with Persistent Systems to provide community banks and credit unions with the technology to compete in point of sale financing. FinMkt has worked with the National Association of Professionally Accredited Contractors (NAPAC) to provide NAPAC's members with a multi-lender point of sale financing platform. In addition, Porch has licensed FinMkt's multi-lender point of sale loan platform for their contractor network. FinMkt has partnered with the leader in nonprime lending, OneMain Financial to provide nonprime customers access to borrowing solutions and also partnered with PenFed to meet the demands of their members and merchant customers for affordable, easy-to-use financing. Renewal by Andersen has also licensed FinMkt's technology.

== Accolades ==
In 2017, FinMkt was included in CreditDonkey's Best in Finance Technology list. And in November 2020, FinMkt was chosen out of 150 applications to compete in Money20/20's MoneyPitch, sponsored by Mastercard, and won the final round. FinMkt was named to the World Economic Forum as a Tech Pioneer in 2021, and a finalist for LendTech of the Year in 2022. That same year, FinMkt was named Best New Embedded Platform and the following year named a Power 300 Fintech Company. FinMkt was named to Inc's Best Workplaces list, shortlisted for US Fintech Awards Team of The Year, and placed #815 to the Inc. 5000 List in 2023.

FinMkt's CEO and founder, Luan Cox, was named to NYC Fintech Women's Inspiring Fintech Females 2019 list. The following year, she was one of The Top 25 Women Leaders in Financial Technology of 2020 in the Financial Technology Report. In 2023, she was a Female Founders 200 Honoree, and named to the Forbes 50 over 50 list.
