= Deed of trust (real estate) =

Instrument to create security interest in real estate

A deed of trust refers to a type of legal instrument which is used to create a security interest in real property and real estate. In a deed of trust, a person who wishes to borrow money conveys legal title in real property to a trustee, who holds the property as security for a loan (debt) from the lender to the borrower. The equitable title remains with the borrower. The borrower is referred to as the trustor, while the lender is referred to as the beneficiary.

== Overview ==
Transactions involving deeds of trust are normally structured, at least in theory, so that the lender/beneficiary gives the borrower/trustor the money to buy the property; the borrower/trustor tenders the money to the seller; the seller executes a grant deed giving the property to the borrower/trustor; and the borrower/trustor immediately executes a deed of trust giving the property to the trustee to be held in trust for the lender/beneficiary. In reality, an escrow holder is always used so that the transaction does not close until the escrow holder has the funds, grant deed, and deed of trust in their possession. This ensures the transaction can be easily rescinded if one party is unable to complete its part of the deal.

Deeds of trust differ from mortgages in that deeds of trust always involve at least three parties, where the third party holds the legal title, while in the context of mortgages, the mortgagor gives legal title directly to the mortgagee. In either case, equitable title always remains with the borrower. Both mortgages and deeds of trust are essentially security instruments in the form of conveyances; that is, they appear to provide on their face for absolute conveyances of legal title, but it is implicitly understood that the borrower is retaining equitable title and the conveyance is intended to merely create a security interest. This confusing situation is a legacy of the archaic (and now-obsolete) common law requirement of livery of seisin, under which English common law courts had refused to enforce shifting fees or springing freehold interests (that is, a gage for years that was supposed to automatically expand to fee simple title if the underlying debt was not repaid).

A deed of trust is normally recorded with the recorder or county clerk for the county where the property is located as evidence of and security for the debt. The act of recording provides constructive notice to the world that the property has been encumbered. When the debt is fully paid, the beneficiary is required by law to promptly direct the trustee to transfer legal title to the property back to the trustor by reconveyance, thereby releasing the security for the debt.

Deeds of trust are the most common instrument used in the financing of real estate purchases in Alaska, Arizona, California, Colorado, the District of Columbia, Idaho, Maryland, Mississippi, Missouri, Montana, Nebraska, Nevada, North Carolina, Oregon, Tennessee, Texas, Utah, Virginia, Washington, and West Virginia, whereas most other states use mortgages. Besides purchases, deeds of trust can also be used for loans made for other kinds of purposes where real estate is merely offered as collateral, and are also used to secure performance of contracts other than loans.

== Power of sale and trustee's sale ==
A deed of trust has a crucial advantage over a mortgage from the lender's point of view. If the borrower defaults on the loan, the trustee has the power to foreclose on the property on behalf of the beneficiary. In most U.S. states, a deed of trust (but not a mortgage) can contain a special "power of sale" clause that permits the trustee to exercise these powers. An example is the standard conveyance clause from a Freddie Mac "uniform instrument":

Borrower irrevocably grants and conveys to Trustee, in trust, with power of sale, the following described property...

In the states that enforce "power of sale" clauses, the courts have uniformly held that by executing a deed of trust with a "power of sale" clause, the owner has authorized the trustee to conduct a nonjudicial foreclosure in the event of default. That is, unlike a mortgage, the lender need not sue the borrower in a state court; instead, the lender/beneficiary merely directs the trustee to mail, post, serve, publish, and/or record certain notices required by law, culminating in a "trustee's sale" at which the trustee auctions the property to the highest bidder. The borrower's equitable title normally terminates automatically by operation of law (under applicable statutes or case law) at the trustee's sale. The trustee then issues a deed conveying the legal and equitable title to the property in fee simple to the highest bidder. In turn, the successful bidder records the deed and becomes the owner of record. Thus, the advantage of deeds of trust is that the lender can recover the value of the collateral for the loan much more quickly, and without the expense and uncertainty of suing the borrower, which is why lenders overwhelmingly prefer such deeds to mortgages.

The time periods for the "trustee's sale" or "power of sale" foreclosure process vary dramatically between jurisdictions. Some states have very short timelines. For example, in Virginia, it can be as short as two weeks. In California, a nonjudicial foreclosure takes a minimum of approximately 112 days from start to finish. The process starts only when the lender or trustee records a "notice of default" no matter how long the loan payments have been unpaid. For certain home loans made between 2003 and 2007, because of current economic conditions, California law was amended to add a temporary additional 60 days to the process.

== Terminology ==
Historically, some of these documents were titled "deeds of trust" and others were titled "trust deeds," and U.S. case law prior to about 1990 tends to reflect both usages. Due to the rise of real estate securitization in the 1990s and the shift from "lend to hold" to "lend to securitize," the majority of residential real estate transactions are now completed with uniform security instruments which are consistently described as "deeds of trust" so as to avoid confusion with true trusts or true deeds (i.e., true conveyances rather than security interests in the form of conveyances). Thus, the more precise term of art "deed of trust" has become predominant in the case law since then.

Though a mortgage is technically an entirely different legal instrument (as noted above), deeds of trust are frequently called mortgages in the real estate loan business due to the functional similarity between deeds of trust and mortgages.

Although a deed of trust usually states that the borrower is making an "irrevocable" transfer to the trustee, it is common in many jurisdictions for borrowers to obtain second and third mortgages or trust deeds that make similar transfers to additional trustees (that is, of a property they already conveyed to the trustee on their first deed of trust). As with mortgages, deeds of trust are subject to the rule "first in time, first in right," meaning that the beneficiary of the first recorded deed of trust may foreclose and wipe out all junior deeds of trust recorded later in time. If this happens, the junior debt still exists, but may become unsecured. If the debtor has sufficient senior secured claims upon his assets, lacks equity, or is otherwise insolvent, the junior liens may be wiped out completely in bankruptcy.

== See also ==
- Trust deed investment company
- Trust instrument
- Protected trust deed
