= Home Ownership and Equity Protection Act of 1994 =

In September 1994, President Bill Clinton signed into law the Home Ownership and Equity Protection Act of 1994, written by US Rep. Joseph P. Kennedy (D-Mass). The law requires certain disclosures and clamps restrictions on lenders of high-cost loans.

Implemented via Regulation Z at 12 CFR 226.32, it only applies to non-purchase-money transactions.

The law gives the Federal Reserve Board the power to administer the act and to adjust the implementing regulations. Critics of Alan Greenspan argue that he failed to properly use these powers when subprime mortgage problems became apparent in 2005.
