= Isaac Shaw =

English rugby league footballer

Personal information
- Full name: Isaac Shaw
- Born: 11 September 2002 (age 23) Wakefield, West Yorkshire, England

Playing information
- Position: Prop
Club
Years	Team	Pld	T	G	FG	P
2022	Wakefield Trinity	5	0	0	0	0
2022(loan)	→ Sheffield Eagles	2	0	0	0	0
2023	Villeneuve Leopards	6	1	0	0	4
2023–25	Wakefield Trinity	6	0	0	0	0
2023(loan)	→ Hull Kingston Rovers	1	0	0	0	0
2024(DR)	→ Hunslet RLFC	4	0	0	0	0
2025(loan)	→ Batley Bulldogs	6	0	0	0	0
2025	Salford Red Devils	3	0	0	0	0
2026–	Midlands Hurricanes	0	0	0	0	0
	Total	33	1	0	0	4
- Source: As of 29 January 2026

Isaac Shaw (born 11 September 2002) is an English professional rugby league footballer who plays as a prop for the Midlands Hurricanes in the RFL Championship.

== Playing career ==
=== Wakefield Trinity ===
In February 2022 Shaw made his Wakefield Trinity Super League début against the Catalans Dragons.

=== Sheffield Eagles (loan) ===
He has spent time on loan from Wakefield Trinity at the Sheffield Eagles in the Championship.

=== Villeneuve Leopards ===
On 27 January 2023 it was announced that he had joined Villeneuve Leopards playing in the Elite One Championship until the end of the French 2023 season.

=== Wakefield Trinity (rejoin) ===
On 31 May 2023 re-joined Wakefield Trinity on a deal until the end of the 2023 season.

On 10 June 2025 it was reported that he had left the club with immediate effect

=== Hunslet RLFC (loan) ===
On 4 April 2024 it was reported that he had signed for Hunslet RLFC in the RFL League 1 on DR loan.

=== Castleford Tigers ===
On 20 June 2025 it was speculated that he had joined Castleford Tigers in the Super League for a trial period.

=== Salford Red Devils ===
On 28 August 2025 it was reported that he had signed for Salford Red Devils in the Super League

=== Midlands Hurricanes ===
On 9 January 2026 it was reported that he had signed for Midlands Hurricanes in the RFL Championship
