= Gap financing =

Short-term loan covering the gap between available funds and total financing needs

Gap financing is a term mostly associated with mortgage loans or property loans. It is an interim loan given by a bank to a person until they can get money from somewhere else, often so that they are able to buy another house before they sell their own.

== Overview ==
More specifically, gap financing is subordinated temporary financing paid off when the first mortgagee disburses the full amount due under the first mortgage loan. This is normal in a situation involving a permanent “floor-ceiling loan,” where the borrower does not meet a rent-roll requirement, and the first mortgagee funds only a floor amount, agreeing to fund the balance in the event the rent-roll requirement is met within a stated period. In this case, the gap lender is often the construction lender. Where the gap lender has agreed prior to construction to make the gap loan, the document that ties together the construction loan, the gap loan, and the permanent loan is the buy-sell agreement. In this agreement, a special provision is inserted providing that if the permanent lender's rent-roll holdback is not fulfilled at the time for the permanent closing, the construction lender agrees to disburse, at a concurrent closing date, funds equal to the amount withheld by the permanent lender pursuant to its commitment. These gap funds are normally evidenced by a promissory note secured by a junior mortgage subject and subordinate in all respects to the permanent loan documentation. The gap documents usually state unequivocally that, in the event the rent-roll requirement is not met during the rent-roll period, the permanent lender still retains the right on demand to purchase the gap note and discharge of record any second mortgage held by the construction lender. The borrower normally assigns to the construction lender all funds that would otherwise be payable to the borrower in the event the rent-roll requirement is met, with the construction lender agreeing to reassign to the borrower all funds that would be payable pursuant to the rent-roll requirement at such time as the gap loan note is paid in full. In addition, the permanent lender usually requires that the temporary lender and borrower agree that no funds will be disbursed under the gap documents, except at the closing of the permanent loan.

Normally, the permanent lender's rent-roll requirement involves a period that runs from one to three years. However, the promissory note for the gap loan should be predicated on the possibility that the rent-roll requirement may not be met, and the terms should include a period of four to five years beyond the rent-roll requirement period, with a high enough interest rate to prompt the developer to refinance whenever it becomes feasible to do so. With regard to principal amortization, some gap lenders require none, while others require either partial amortization or amortization to the extent that there is net cash flow to be derived from the project.

Because of its prior position as construction lender, the gap lender usually has sufficient leverage with the permanent lender to receive adequate notice provisions and a right-to-cure period from the permanent lender.

Gap financing can also be used in purchase/rehab lending to fill the "gap" between the borrower's down payment, and the amount lent by the 1st lien holder, or rehab lender. Typically rehab lenders will only go to 65-70% ARV (After Repair Value), so if the borrower is bringing 10% into the deal, the gap funder would provide the other 20-25%, and take a 2nd position lien and often a portion of the profit.
