= Nathan Connell =

English rugby league footballer

Personal information
- Full name: Nathan Connell
- Born: 1 May 2003 (age 23) Wigan, Greater Manchester, England

Playing information
- Position: Fullback
Club
Years	Team	Pld	T	G	FG	P
2024–25	Salford Red Devils	26	2	0	0	8
2024(loan)	→ Whitehaven	3	1	0	0	4
2026	Widnes Vikings	30	22	0	0	88
2027–	Bradford Bulls	0	0	0	0	0
	Total	59	25	0	0	100
Representative
Years	Team	Pld	T	G	FG	P
2022	Ireland under-19	4	7	18	0	64
- As of 5 October 2026

Nathan Connell (born 1 May 2003) is a professional rugby league footballer who plays as a fullback for the Bradford Bulls in the Super League

== Career ==
=== Junior ===
Connell began playing rugby at the age of 6 at Shevington Sharks, joining Salford Foundation’s Rising Stars programme and the Eccles College Development Academy, where his performances began to attract attention. He was named Development Academy Player of the Year in 2022.

=== Whitehaven ===
He was loaned to Whitehaven, where he made his senior rugby league debut, on the 29 March 2024, he started at fullback in the Cumbrian derby against Barrow Raiders, Whitehaven won 23-22 with Connell crossing the whitewash scoring a try.

=== Salford Red Devils ===
His senior debut for Salford came in the 13th round of the 2024 Super League, coming off the bench in a 34-4 win over the London Broncos.

=== Widnes Vikings ===
Ahead of the 2026 season, Connell joined Cheshire side Widnes Vikings on a one-year contract. Across the 2026 he scored 22 tries in 30 appearances, being named the clubs player of the month twice in March and July. He won Player's Player of the Year and Fan's Player of the Year.

=== Bradford Bulls ===
He signed for Super League side Bradford Bulls on a two-year contract securing him until the end of 2028.

=== Ireland under-19 ===
He featured in all four of Ireland under-19's games in the 2022 European Championship Shield, scoring 7 tries and 18 goals. Ireland winning the competition, winning all four of their games.
