= Bridge loan =

Type of short-term loan

A bridge loan is a type of short-term loan, typically taken out for a period of 2 weeks to 3 years pending the arrangement of larger or longer-term financing. It is usually called a bridging loan in the United Kingdom, also known as a "caveat loan," and also known in some applications as a swing loan. In South African usage, the term bridging finance is more common.

A bridge loan is interim financing for an individual or business until permanent financing or the next stage of financing is obtained. Money from the new financing is generally used to "take out" (i.e. to pay back) the bridge loan, as well as other capitalization needs.

Bridge loans are typically more expensive than conventional financing, to compensate for the additional risk. Bridge loans typically have a higher interest rate, points, costs that are amortized over a shorter period, and various other fees and "sweeteners" (such as equity participation by the lender in some loans). The lender also may require cross-collateralization and a lower loan-to-value ratio. On the other hand, they are typically arranged quickly with relatively little documentation.

== Real estate ==
Bridge loans are often used for commercial real estate purchases to quickly close on a property, retrieve real estate from foreclosure, or take advantage of a short-term opportunity in order to secure long-term financing. Bridge loans on a property are typically paid back when the property is sold, refinanced with a traditional lender, the borrower's creditworthiness improves, the property is improved or completed, or there is a specific improvement or change that allows a permanent or subsequent round of mortgage financing to occur. The timing issue may arise from project phases with different cash needs and risk profiles as much as ability to secure funding.

A bridge loan is similar to and overlaps with a hard money loan. Both are non-standard loans obtained due to short-term or unusual circumstances. The difference is that hard money refers to the lending source, usually an individual, investment pool, or private company that is not a bank in the business of making high-risk, high-interest loans, whereas a bridge loan is a short-term loan that "bridges the gap" between longer-term loans.

=== Characteristics ===
For typical terms of up to 12 months, 2–4 points may be charged. Loan-to-value (LTV) ratios generally do not exceed 65% for commercial properties, or 80% for residential properties, based on appraised value.

A bridge loan may be closed, meaning it is available for a predetermined time frame, or open in that there is no fixed payoff date (although there may be a required payoff after a certain time).

A first charge bridging loan is generally available at a higher LTV than a second charge bridging loan due to the lower level of risk involved, many UK lenders will steer clear of second charge lending altogether.

Lower LTVs may also attract lower rates, again representing the lower level of underwriting risk, although front-end fees, lenders legal fees, and valuation payments may remain fixed.

=== Examples ===
- A bridge loan is often obtained by developers to carry a project while permit approval is sought. Because there is no guarantee the project will happen, the loan might be at a high-interest rate and from a specialized lending source that will accept the risk. Once the project is fully entitled, it becomes eligible for loans from more conventional sources that are at a lower interest, for a longer term, and in a greater amount. A construction loan would then be obtained to take out the bridge loan and fund the completion of the project.
- A consumer is purchasing a new residence and plans to make a down payment with the proceeds from the sale of a currently owned home. The currently owned home will not close until after the close of the new residence. A bridge loan allows the buyer to take equity out of the current home and use it as a down payment on the new residence, with the expectation that the current home will close within a short time frame and the bridge loan will be repaid.
- A bridging loan can be used by a business to ensure continued smooth operation during a time when for example one senior partner wishes to leave whilst another wishes to continue the business. The bridging loan could be made based on the value of the company premises allowing funds to be raised via other sources for example a management buy in.
- A property may be offered at a discount if the purchaser can complete quickly with the discount offsetting the costs of the short term bridging loan used to complete. In auction property purchases where the purchaser has only 14–28 days to complete long term lending such as a buy to let mortgage may not be viable in that time frame whereas a bridging loan would be.

== Corporate finance ==
Bridge loans are used in venture capital and other corporate finance for several purposes:

- To inject small amounts of cash to carry a company so that it does not run out of cash between successive major private equity financings
- To carry distressed companies while searching for an acquirer or larger investor (in which case the lender often obtains a substantial equity position in connection with the loan)
- As a final debt financing to carry the company through the immediate period before an initial public offering or an acquisition.

== South Africa ==
In South African law immovable property is transferred via a system of registration in public registries known as Deeds Offices. Given the delays resulting from the transfer process, many participants in property transactions require access to funds which will otherwise only become available on the day that the transaction is registered in the relevant Deeds Office.

Bridging finance companies provide finance that creates a bridge between the participant's immediate cash flow requirement and the eventual entitlement to funds on registration in the Deeds Office. Bridging finance is typically not provided by banks.

Various forms of bridging finance are available, depending on the participant in the property transaction that requires finance. Sellers of fixed property can bridge sales proceeds, estate agents bridge estate agents' commission, and mortgagors bridge the proceeds of further or switch bonds. Bridging finance is also available to settle outstanding property taxes or municipal accounts or to pay transfer duties.

== United Kingdom ==
=== History ===
Short term finance similar to modern bridging loans was available in the UK as early as the 1960s, but usually only through high street banks and building societies to known customers. The bridging loan market remained small into the millennium, with a limited number of lenders.

Bridging loans became increasingly popular in the UK after the 2008–2009 global recession, with gross lending more than doubling from £0.8 billion in the year to March 2011 to £2.2 billion in the year to June 2014. This coincided with a marked decline in mainstream mortgage lending in the same period, as banks and building societies grew more reluctant to grant home loans.

The overall value of the residential loan amounts outstanding in Q1 2016 was £1,304.5billion, an increase of 1.0% compared with Q4 2015 and an increase of 3.4% over the past four quarters.

As the popularity of bridging loans increased, so too did the controversy around them. In 2011, the Financial Services Authority (FSA) warned homebuyers against using bridging loans as substitutes for ordinary mortgages, expressing fears that some mortgage brokers might be misrepresenting their suitability.

In February 2026, the UK bridging market faced significant disruption when Market Financial Solutions, a major specialist lender with a £2.4 billion loan book, entered administration following allegations of collateral irregularities and double-pledging of assets. Joint administrators from AlixPartners were appointed by the High Court on 25 February 2026, and creditors subsequently reported a shortfall of approximately £930 million linked to the alleged double pledges.

=== Usage ===
In the United Kingdom, bridging loans are used in both business and real estate. In the former, they are typically used to free equity in order to boost cash flow. In the latter, they are used by home-movers to ‘break’ property chains by providing a short-term source of finance when there is a delay between sale and completion dates, by buyers bidding on property at auction, and by landlords and property developers to secure renovation finance for quick sale or to refurbish a property that is considered uninhabitable prior to obtaining ordinary mortgage finance.

=== Characteristics ===
Bridging loans can be secured as a first or second charge against real property, including commercial real estate, buy-to-let property, dilapidated property and land or building plots. Loan terms typically run up to 18 months, with compound interest charged monthly; as such, they are often more expensive than other types of secured home loan.

Bridging loans are defined as either ‘opened’ or ‘closed’. A loan is closed if the borrower has a clear and credible repayment plan or exit strategy in place, such as the sale of the loan security or longer-term finance. Open bridging loans are riskier to both the borrower and creditor due to the greater likelihood of default.

=== Regulation ===
Bridging loans secured by first charge against a property in which the borrower or a close family member will reside are considered regulated mortgage contracts, and are therefore regulated by the Financial Conduct Authority (FCA). Bridging loans sold to landlords and property developers are generally not regulated; however, if the occupant of the rental property against which the loan is secured is or will be a close family member of the borrower, FCA regulation will still apply.

An exception exists in the case of mixed-use properties, where the borrower or a close relative will occupy less than 40% of the property. On 21 March 2016, the UK implemented the pan-European Mortgage Credit Directive (MCD). Under the FCA's final rules, the 40% threshold was retained as the test for a regulated mortgage contract, so the ‘40% rule’ continues to apply to bridging loans secured on mixed-use properties.

== See also ==
- Hard money lenders
- Commercial lenders
- Non-conforming loan
- Gap financing
