= Hard money loan =

Short-term capital loans funded by private parties and secured by real estate

A hard money loan is a specific type of asset-based loan: a financing instrument through which a borrower receives funds secured by real property. Interest rates are typically higher than conventional commercial or residential property loans because of the higher risk and shorter duration of the loan.

== Overview ==
Most hard money loans are used for projects lasting from a few months to a few years. Hard money is similar to a bridge loan, which usually has similar criteria for lending as well as costs to the borrowers. The primary difference is that a bridge loan often refers to a commercial property or investment property that may be in transition and does not yet qualify for traditional financing, whereas hard money often refers to not only an asset-based loan with a high interest rate, but possibly a distressed financial situation, such as arrears on the existing mortgage, or where bankruptcy and foreclosure proceedings are occurring.

The loan amount the hard money lender is able to lend is determined by the ratio of loan amount divided by the value of the property. This is known as the loan to value (LTV). Many hard money lenders will only lend up to 65% of the current value of the property. There is no such thing as 100% LTV for this type of transactions. These loans are meant for investors and the lenders will always require a higher down payment.

"Hard money" is a term that is used almost exclusively in the United States and Canada, where these types of loans are most common. In commercial real estate, hard money developed as an alternative "last resort" for property owners seeking capital against the equity in their real estate holdings. The industry began in the late 1950s when the credit industry in the U.S. underwent drastic changes.

In recent years, industry consensus is that the term "hard money" no longer accurately describes the industry's direction, structure or attitude, and that alternative terms are preferable. In March 2022, the National Private Lenders Association (NPLA), a trade group representing the industry, passed an official resolution encouraging industry participants to no longer use the term “hard money,” and instead use terms like “private lending,” “bridge lending” and “transitional lending.” In addition, the American Association of Private Lenders (AAPL), another industry trade group, published an article, “The Demise of ‘Hard Money’ in a Private Lending World,” highlighting the group’s efforts since its inception to minimize the use of the "hard money" term. The focus of AAPL's 2021 conference was the change around hard money terminology.

From inception, the hard money field has always been formally unregulated by state or federal laws, although some restrictions on interest rates (usury laws) by state governments restrict the rates of hard money such that operations in several states, including Tennessee and Arkansas, are virtually untenable for lending firms.

The hard money loan mortgage market has greatly expanded since the 2009 mortgage crisis with the passing of the Dodd-Frank Act. The reason for this expansion is primarily due to the strict regulation put on banks and lenders in the mortgage qualification process. The Dodd-Frank and Truth in Lending Act set forth Federal guidelines requiring mortgage originators, lenders, and mortgage brokers to evaluate the borrower's ability to repay the loan on primary residences or face huge fines for noncompliance. Therefore, hard money lenders only lend on business purpose or commercial loans in order to avoid the risk of the loan falling within Dodd–Frank, TILA, and HOEPA guidelines.

Because the primary basis for making a hard money loan is the liquidation value of the collateral backing the note, hard money lenders will always want to determine the LTV (loan to value) prior to making any extension of financing. A hard money lender determines the value of the property through a BPO (broker price opinion) or an independent appraisal done by a licensed appraiser in the state in which the property is located.

The interest rates on hard money loans are typically higher than the rates charged for traditional business loans. Rates could be as low as 6% and as high as 14% or more. Despite this, such loan options are popular among real estate investors for their fast approvals, higher flexibility, less extensive documentation procedures, and because they are sometimes the only option for securing funds.

== See also ==
- Non-conforming loan — a loan that fails to meet bank criteria for funding
